= Anaconda (character) =

Marvel Comics fictional character

- Anaconda as seen in Battle Scars #3. Art by Scot Eaton

Publication information
- Publisher: Marvel Comics
- First appearance: Marvel Two-in-One #64 (June 1980)
- Created by: Mark Gruenwald; Ralph Macchio

In-story information
- Alter ego: Blanche Sitznski
- Species: Human Mutate
- Team affiliations: Six Pack; Serpent Squad; Serpent Society; Femizons; Legion Accursed; Assassins Guild
- Abilities: Excellent swimmer Skilled street fighter Superhuman strength and durability Limb elongation Underwater breathing Regeneration

Anaconda (Blanche Sitznski) is a supervillain appearing in American comic books published by Marvel Comics. She has generally been associated with the Serpent Society, often as a foe of Captain America. Sitznski was given her superhuman abilities by the Roxxon corporation, giving her the codename Anaconda due to her powerful, adamantium-enhanced arms which she uses to constrain or crush her opponents. Her first appearance was as part of the Serpent Squad, when they tried to retrieve the Serpent Crown only to be thwarted by Thing, Stingray and Triton. She later became a core member of Sidewinder's Serpent Squad and remained a member when they became the Serpent Society.

In 2020, Anaconda was ranked as CBR's 5th best female Marvel supervillain.

== Publication history ==
Anaconda was created by Mark Gruenwald and Ralph Macchio and first appeared in Marvel Two-in-One #64 in June 1980.

The character received biographical entries in The Official Handbook of the Marvel Universe #1 (1983), The Official Handbook of the Marvel Universe Deluxe Edition #1 (1985), Gamer's Handbook of the Marvel Universe #4 (1988), The Official Handbook of the Marvel Universe Master Edition #1 (1990), and Deadpool Corps: Rank and Foul #1 (2010).

== Fictional character biography ==
Anaconda squeezes the life out of the Thing.

Blanche "Blondie" Sitznski was born in Pittsburgh, Pennsylvania. She worked as a steelworker until executives at the Roxxon Oil Company selected her to become a special agent in covert operations. Sitznski was already well-adjusted to villainy, having been a calisthenics instructor at the criminal trainer Taskmaster's Academy. It was there that she trained several women in hand-to-hand combat, most notably Diamondback and Snapdragon. Sitznski is eventually taken to Roxxon's laboratories and biologically enhanced to possess an adamantium skeleton, gills, and the ability to elongate her limbs.

=== Serpent Squad ===
Anaconda's first mission as part of the second Serpent Squad groups her with three other snake-themed villains: Sidewinder, Black Mamba, and Death Adder. They are tasked with retrieving the Serpent Crown for Roxxon president Hugh Jones. During the mission, the group battles the Thing, Stingray, and Triton. The three find the Serpent Crown, but the Thing and Triton retaliate, trapping them underwater.

Anaconda frees herself and her teammates from their underwater captivity, and they are sent to search for a powerful weapon known as the Micro-Scanner. After battling Iron Man, Anaconda and the others are defeated and imprisoned.

=== Serpent Society ===
Anaconda pummels Captain America.

Anaconda escapes prison and seeks out Sidewinder for payment from her first mission. He gives her a share of the money and invites her to join the Serpent Society. At her orientation, Sidewinder groups Anaconda together with Cobra and Rattler to perform an initiation test: stealing equipment from the bankrupt Brand Corporation. Constrictor, annoyed with the idea of the Serpent Society, spies on Anaconda's group and calls the Avengers to tip them off. Anaconda attempts to crush Captain America's bones, but one well-placed hit of his shield knocks her out, and she is taken to jail.

Teleported out by Sidewinder, Anaconda visits Constrictor, beating him to near death. Anaconda also participates in a mission to murder MODOK, but is knocked out early in the fight. However, her teammates Cottonmouth and Death Adder are able to kill MODOK and bring his corpse to A.I.M. for the large sum profit they were promised. Soon after, Death Adder is murdered by the Scourge of the Underworld. Anaconda vows to find the murderer and avenge Death Adder.

Anaconda later becomes romantically involved with Puff Adder, a new member of the Serpent Society. They and Rock Python are sent to retrieve Diamondback, who has escaped her death sentence. Their kidnapping attempt is interrupted by an invitation to join Superia's all-female villain group, the Femizons. After the Femizons disband, Anaconda rejoins the Serpent Society.

Anaconda later joins S.H.I.E.L.D.'s espionage team, the Six Pack. She eventually turns on them, along with Constrictor, Solo, and Domino, to join forces with Cable, who is trying to create a sanctuary. She continues to work with the Six Pack as they commit acts of terrorism in Rumekistan to diminish Cable's reputation. Cable exacts revenge on the Six Pack by defeating them all and returning them to the United States.

=== Secret Invasion ===
During the Secret Invasion storyline, Anaconda rejoins the Serpent Society. The Society holds a number of civilians hostage in the American Midwest, claiming to be protecting them from the Skrulls. However, the Society is stopped by Nova and the Nova Corps.

=== Serpent Solutions ===
As part of the All-New, All-Different Marvel event, Anaconda appears as a member of Viper's Serpent Society under its new name Serpent Solutions.

During the Secret Empire storyline, Anaconda and the members of Serpent Solutions join Helmut Zemo's Army of Evil.

== Powers and abilities ==
Anaconda constricts her arms around Cable.

Anaconda has the superhuman ability to elongate her limbs and constrict her opponents. Her arms and legs are able to elongate to about one and a half times their normal length, while her muscles engorge with blood, giving the appearance of massive, snake-like limbs. She has also been surgically given gills, which allow her to breathe underwater, and modified lungs for extracting oxygen from water. Anaconda also possesses a healing factor, allowing her to heal from non-fatal wounds several times faster than a normal human being. Her skeleton is laced with an adamantium alloy-based substance, increasing her durability.

== Other versions ==
=== Ultimate Marvel ===
An alternate universe version of Anaconda from Earth-1610 appears in the Ultimate Marvel imprint as a member of the Serpent Squad. She later leaves the Serpent Squad and joins the Serpent Skulls gang.

=== Marvel Adventures ===
An alternate universe version of Anaconda from Earth-20051 appears in Marvel Adventures Spider-Man #44 as a member of the Serpent Society.

=== Earth-33900 ===
In the Avengers series dedicated to the American Armed Forces, Anaconda appears as a member of the Serpent Society.

=== Marvel Super Hero Adventures ===
An alternate universe version of Anaconda from Earth-17154 appears in Marvel Super Hero Adventures as a member of the Serpent Society.

=== Deadpool: Samurai ===
Anaconda appears in the second volume of Deadpool: Samurai, part of the Marvel × Shōnen Jump+ Super Collaboration.

== In other media ==
Anaconda appears in The Avengers: Earth's Mightiest Heroes, voiced by Vanessa Marshall.
