= Copperhead (Marvel Comics) =

Copperhead is the name of three different supervillains appearing in American comic books published by Marvel Comics. The first Copperhead was Lawrence Chesney, who made his debut in Daredevil #124 (Aug 1975) and was created by writers Len Wein and Marv Wolfman, and artist Gene Colan. The second Copperhead, Arthur Reynolds, was a coworker of Chesney and stole his costume after Chesney was killed. Reynolds first appeared in Human Fly #8 (Apr 1978) by writer Bill Mantlo and artist Frank Robbins. The third person to use the name Copperhead is totally unrelated to the first two characters, Davis Lawfers, who took the name from the snake of the same name. Lawfers first appeared in Captain America #337 (1988) created by writers Mark Gruenwald and Ralph Macchio and artist Tom Morgan.

Chesney's mental illness caused him to think he was Copperhead, a pulp fiction hero he grew up reading. Chesney would leave copper pennies on the eyes of his murder victims. When he began to target the writer and publisher of the original Copperhead stories he was stopped by Daredevil. During the fight Chesney was struck by lightning and killed. Reynolds worked with Chesney as a museum guard and later discovered Chesney's secret identity. Using the costume he planned to rob the museum where he worked as a guard, but was stopped by White Tiger and the Human Fly.

The third Copperhead, was originally a henchman of Viper, given a suit with built in powers based on the Copperhead. Teamed up with Fer-de-lance, Black Racer, and Puff Adder they formed the Serpent Squad, a ploy to get them accepted into the Serpent Society. The group is accepted by Sidewinder and the Serpent Society, enabling them to help push Sidewider out of power, allowing Viper to take control of the group. When Viper is deposed later on Copperhead leaves the Serpent Society. He later returned to the Serpent Society and became part of Serpent Solutions when the group was reorganized in 2015.

== Publication history ==
The Lawrence Chesney version of Copperhead first appeared in Daredevil #124-125 (August–September 1975), and was created by Len Wein, Marv Wolfman, and Gene Colan. The character subsequently appears in Human Fly #9 (May 1978), Daredevil #1/2 (1998), and Daredevil/Spider-Man #1-4 (January–April 2001). Copperhead received an entry in the All-New Official Handbook of the Marvel Universe A-Z #3 (2006).

The second Copperhead appeared in Human Fly #8-9 (Apr-May 1978), and was created by Bill Mantlo and Frank Robbins.

The third Copperhead appeared in Captain America #337 (1988), and was created by Mark Gruenwald, Ralph Macchio and Tom Morgan

== Fictional character biography ==
=== Lawrence Chesney ===
Copperhead

Publication information
- Publisher: Marvel Comics
- First appearance: Daredevil #124 (Aug 1975)
- Created by: Len Wein; Marv Wolfman; Gene Colan

In-story information
- Alter ego: Lawrence Chesney
- Team affiliations: Gang of Four
- Partnerships: Agent of unnamed demon
- Abilities: Wears a suit of copper armor Use of a gun that shoots paralyzing or lethal darts

Lawrence Chesney grew up hearing the tales of a pulp fiction hero named Copperhead from his father, who was the model for the covers of the Copperhead pulps and came to believe he was Copperhead. Chesney, warped by his father's madness, assumes the Copperhead guise, and leaves his calling card of copper pennies on the eyes of his victims. His murders of the writer and the publisher of the Copperhead pulps brings him the attention of Daredevil. As he fights Daredevil, Copperhead is struck by lightning and killed by electrocution.

After death, Copperhead becomes the agent of a demon. He is returned to Earth to retrieve Spider-Man's soul, but fails after battling Spider-Man and Daredevil.

=== Arthur Reynolds ===
Copperhead

Publication information
- Publisher: Marvel Comics
- First appearance: Human Fly #8 (Apr 1978)
- Created by: Bill Mantlo; Frank Robbins

In-story information
- Alter ego: Arthur Reynolds
- Abilities: Wears a suit of copper armor Use of a gun that shoots paralyzing or lethal darts

Arthur Reynolds discovered that his former co-worker at the museum, Lawrence Chesney, had been Copperhead, and had been killed. Reynolds breaks into Chesney's apartment and steals a spare Copperhead costume, assuming the identity. His plan to rob the museum are thwarted by White Tiger and the Human Fly.

=== Davis Lawfers ===
Copperhead

Publication information
- Publisher: Marvel Comics
- First appearance: Captain America #337 (1988)
- Created by: Mark Gruenwald; Ralph Macchio; Tom Morgan

In-story information
- Alter ego: David Lawfers
- Team affiliations: Serpent Society
- Abilities: Wears copper suit Possesses arsenal of gadgets Gauntlets that shoot poisonous energy blasts

Davis Lawfers was born in Rochester, New York. He was a civil servant before becoming an agent of Viper and a professional criminal. Copperhead was the leader of the fourth Serpent Squad, consisting of Fer-de-lance, Black Racer, and Puff Adder. After Viper takes over leadership of the Serpent Society, Copperhead, Cobra, and Boomslang are assigned to poison the water supply of Washington D.C. with a mutagenic substance. After Viper's plot is foiled, the Society re-organizes with Cobra as leader, with Copperhead leaving the group.

During the Secret Invasion storyline, Lawfers rejoins the Society. The Society holds a number of civilians hostage in a compound in the American Midwest, claiming they are protecting themselves from Skrull forces. The Society is easily defeated by Nova and his new Nova Corps.

In the All-New, All-Different Marvel publishing line, Copperhead appears as a member of Viper's Serpent Society under its new name of Serpent Solutions.

== Powers and abilities ==
Copperhead has no superhuman powers. He has moderate experience in hand-to-hand combat and street fighting techniques, but mainly relies on his weaponry.

He wears finger-shooters on his gauntlets which project electrical discharges ("poison-blasts"); a spring-loaded, telescoping, rapid-retracting, wrist-mounted, titanium steel alloy grappling hook ("shooting fang"), with 30-foot (9.1 m) cable line; exploding magnesium flare-bombs stored in his snake-head helmet compartment ("copper-bursts"); micro-suction cups in gloves and boots, enabling adhesion to walls and ceilings. His equipment was designed by technicians hired by Viper. His gauntlets need to be recharged regularly using the spare poison-blast cartridges in his belt.

For protection, Copperhead wears a copper suit of scale mail, which functions as light body armor made of micro-mesh chain-mail covered with reinforced synthetic chain-mail tunic.

== In other media ==
The Davis Lawfers incarnation of Copperhead appears in Captain America: Brave New World, portrayed by Jóhannes Haukur Jóhannesson.
