= Cottonmouth (Burchell Clemens) =

Fictional comic book villain

- Cottonmouth as depicted in Avengers vs. X-Men #0 (March 2012). Art by Frank Cho.

Publication information
- Publisher: Marvel Comics
- First appearance: Captain America #310 (October 1985)
- Created by: Mark Gruenwald (writer); Paul Neary (artist)

In-story information
- Alter ego: Burchell Clemens
- Species: Human mutate
- Team affiliations: Serpent Society
- Abilities: Bionically enhanced jaw and neck muscles Superhuman strength in his jaw Steel teeth Ability to open his mouth larger than the size of a human head

Cottonmouth (Burchell Clemens) is a supervillain appearing in American comic books published by Marvel Comics.

== Publication history ==
Cottonmouth is a snake-themed super villain, mainly associated with the Serpent Society. He first appeared in Captain America #310 (October 1985), and was created by writer Mark Gruenwald and artist Paul Neary. Burchell Clemens was artificially enhanced and given the ability to extend his jaw to over a foot and bite through solid materials such as concrete. He first showed up as part of the Serpent Society, often teaming up with Society member Asp. The team came into conflict with Captain America during a paid hit on MODOK. After being arrested Society leader Sidewinder freed Cottonmouth and others from custody. When Viper took control of the Serpent Society Cottonmouth was one of the members who opposed her, siding with Captain America to take Viper down. Cottonmouth remained a member when the Serpent Society was reorganized as Serpent Solutions.

== Fictional character biography ==
Originally from Mobile, Alabama, Cottonmouth was chosen by Sidewinder to join a snake-themed villain group, the Serpent Society. With the ability to extend his jaws over a foot wide, he was given steel fangs, possibly by the Roxxon Oil Company, which he uses to torture others in an almost cannibalistic manner. His jaw muscles are superhumanly strong, and can bite with sufficient force to crush cinderblock or metals that are softer than iron. Little is known about his past, other than the fact that he was an active criminal in the southern portion of the United States.

The Serpent Society is hired by A.I.M. to hunt down MODOK. During their confrontation with MODOK, Cottonmouth and teammate Death Adder manage to kill him, which is a significant victory for their organization. They are soon defeated by Captain America, but manage to escape. He also participates in the mission to retrieve the retired Porcupine's costume, which turns out to be a trap by Captain America. Cottonmouth is injured during the battle, his teeth being destroyed by Captain America's shield. He, along with Rattler and Death Adder, are eventually defeated and taken into custody, but are broken out by Sidewinder. Cottonmouth and Rattler next confront the Kingpin's men after Death Adder is murdered by the Scourge of the Underworld.

During Viper's invasion, Cottonmouth sides with Diamondback and the other members who refuse to take the leadership away from Sidewinder. He later betrays Diamondback, proving his loyalty to Viper.

In "All-New, All-Different Marvel", Cottonmouth appears as a member of Viper's Serpent Society under its new name Serpent Solutions. He alongside Black Racer and Copperhead attack the second Captain America and Diamondback. Captain America learns too late that Diamondback is a member of Serpent Solutions; she knocks him out and brings him to Serpent Solutions' headquarters.

In the "Hunted" storyline, Cottonmouth and several members of the Serpent Society are captured and forced to participate in a murderous hunt set up by Arcade. The Serpent Society are pursued by Arcade's Hunter-Bots, but are saved by Vulture.

== Powers and abilities ==
Due to bionic reconstruction, Cottonmouth possesses enhanced jaw and neck muscles, and steel teeth enabling him to bite with sufficient force to crush cinderblock or deform metals softer than iron, hang from a rope by his teeth for up to an hour, and to open his mouth larger than the size of a human head.

== In other media ==
- Cottonmouth appears in Marvel Disk Wars: The Avengers as a member of the Serpent Society.
- Cottonmouth appears as a playable character in Lego Marvel's Avengers.
