= Rock Python =

Marvel Comics supervillain

Publication information
- Publisher: Marvel Comics
- First appearance: Captain America #341 (May 1988)
- Created by: Mark Gruenwald and Kieron Dwyer

In-story information
- Alter ego: M'Gula
- Species: Human
- Team affiliations: Serpent Society
- Notable aliases: Michael Gula; Curtis Harris
- Abilities: Rock-hard bones, skin and muscles Use of egg-shaped bombs which ensnare his enemies with steel ribbons or poisons them

Rock Python (M'Gula) is a supervillain appearing in American comic books published by Marvel Comics. The character is usually depicted as a member of the Serpent Society. He first appeared in Captain America #341 (May 1988), and was created by writer Mark Gruenwald and artist Kieron Dwyer. He has durable bones, skin and muscles, and uses specially designed grenades that entangle his opponents in steel ribbons.

Rock Python was introduced as a henchman of Viper as she took control of the Serpent Society, deposing Sidewinder as the leader of the Society. Viper's ploy to take control of the United States was foiled by Captain America and members of the Society loyal to Sidewinder. Rock Python was allowed to remain with the Society after Viper was defeated. He became a member of Serpent Solutions when the Society was reorganized.

== Publication history ==
Rock Python first appeared in Captain America #341 (May 1988), and was created by writer Mark Gruenwald and artist Kieron Dwyer. He appeared in many other Captain America issues, including #342, #343, #355, #365, #367, #380, #381, #382, #385, #386, #387, #411, #413, #434, #435, and #437. He later appeared in Captain America Vol. 4 in issues #30 and #31, The Amazing Spider-Man Vol. 2 in issues #562 and #563, and Avengers Assemble (vol. 3).

== Fictional character biography ==
M'Gula was born in Viceroy, Rudyarda. As Rock Python, he first joined the Serpent Society when the villainous Viper invaded, and battled Nomad. Rock Python undergoes a test to prove his worthiness of being in the Society; he tries to steal Falcon's uniform, but winds up battling Falcon and Battlestar instead.

Rock Python's greatest accomplishment is nearly killing Captain America after he, Anaconda, and Puff Adder are attacked. He drops Captain America from a rooftop, but is ordered by King Cobra to flee so as to not have their base revealed.

Subsequently, M'Gula has also appeared with the Serpent Society as they battle Jack Flag, but are defeated by Force Works. He is next seen with the organization as they capture Diamondback and Captain America, intending to hold them for ransom. The pair soon escape and, in the ensuing battle, Rock Python is defeated.

In "All-New, All-Different Marvel", Rock Python appears as a member of Viper's Serpent Society under its new name of Serpent Solutions.

== Powers and abilities ==
Rock Python has durable skin, muscle, and bones, similar to his namesake. He is impervious to high-caliber arms fire, powerful explosions, intense heat and deadly impacts. He carries small "snake eggs" which, upon impact, release various substances such as smoke bombs, acid, and plastic explosives; and "snake wrap", long metallic ribbons designed to ensnare and immobilize opponents.

== In other media ==
Rock Python received a figure in the Marvel Legends line.
