= Black Mamba (character) =

Marvel Comics fictional character

Publication information
- Publisher: Marvel Comics
- First appearance: Marvel Two-in-One #64 (June 1980)
- Created by: Mark Gruenwald; Ralph Macchio

In-story information
- Alter ego: Tanya Sealy
- Species: Human mutate
- Team affiliations: BAD Girls, Inc. Femizons; Masters of Evil; Secret Avengers; Serpent Society; Serpent Squad; Women Warriors; Assassins Guild
- Notable aliases: Tanya Sweet
- Abilities: Darkforce energy control Illusion generation Limited telepathy

Black Mamba (Tanya Sealy) is a supervillain appearing in American comic books published by Marvel Comics. She first appeared in Marvel Two-in-One #64 (June 1980) created by writers Mark Gruenwald and Ralph Macchio. The character is most closely associated as a founding member of both the Serpent Society and BAD Girls, Inc. but has also been a member of the Masters of Evil, the Femizons and the Women Warriors.

== Publication history ==
Black Mamba first appeared in Marvel Two-in-One #64 (June 1980), and was created by Mark Gruenwald and Ralph Macchio. Black Mamba received an entry in the original Official Handbook of the Marvel Universe #2, and The Official Handbook of the Marvel Universe Deluxe Edition #2.

== Fictional character biography ==
Tanya Sealy was born in Chicago. A former call girl, she was chosen by the Roxxon Oil Company to partake in a covert operation to retrieve the Serpent Crown. The executives at Roxxon had a device surgically implanted in Sealy's brain which granted her superhuman abilities. Working together with three other snake-themed villains, Sidewinder, Anaconda, and Death Adder, she became a founding member of the Serpent Squad.

Black Mamba later joins Sidewinder's group, the Serpent Society, intending to have a steady source of income. While in the Serpent Society, Black Mamba becomes close friends with Diamondback and Asp. The three later form the mercenary group BAD Girls, Inc. She also briefly serves in Superia's all-female group, the Femizons, but betrays the group to aid Captain America and Paladin.

For some time, Black Mamba served in Crimson Cowl's Masters of Evil in hopes of a large profit while battling the Thunderbolts. She later returns to the Serpent Society.

During the "Civil War" storyline, Black Mamba appears along with Diamondback and Asp as a member of Captain America's anti-registration group. She takes part in the final battle of the "war", but does not accept the offer of amnesty that came with Captain America's surrender.

During the "Dark Reign" storyline, Black Mamba is revealed as a member of the Women Warriors, the Initiative's Delaware-based team.

Black Mamba is one of the assassins tasked by the Assassins Guild to collect the bounty on Domino's head. She attempts to use her powers on Wolverine, causing him to perceive his late lover Mariko Yashida. She is later stabbed in the chest by X-23, but is healed by Elixir, to Wolverine's chagrin.

In "All-New, All-Different Marvel", Black Mamba appears as a member of Viper's Serpent Society under its new name Serpent Solutions.

== Powers and abilities ==
Black Mamba possesses three distinct superhuman abilities, all presumably a result of cybernetic enhancements by Roxxon. She most often uses two of her powers in tandem for a unique effect.

She has limited telepathic abilities that allow her to scan the minds of others nearby. The extent of her telepathy is unrevealed; it is unknown if she possesses other abilities possessed by most telepaths, such as mental communication. She uses this power to extract and project illusions of loved ones into her victims' minds while placing her target in a sedated trance-like state in which they are fixated upon the mental image she has created.

Mamba is able to generate a cloud of tangible Darkforce energy that she uses to ensnare her victims, constricting them with potentially fatal force. The victim, however, is generally unaware, and views the Darkforce energy as the loved one she has projected into their mind. Trapped in Mamba's ecstatic trance, the victim is completely unaware that they are being strangled and can die in minutes. She can also use her Darkforce illusions on herself or others, disguising them as whomever she wishes to look like. This effect fades quickly if used on others who leave her line of sight.

In her earliest appearances, Black Mamba also demonstrated the ability to breathe underwater, and to withstand an undefined level of deep ocean pressure and temperature extreme.

== Other versions ==
=== Marvel Zombies ===
A zombified version of Black Mamba from the Battleworld domain of the Deadlands appears in the "Secret Wars" tie-in Thors #3.

=== Ultimate Marvel ===
Black Mamba appears in the Ultimate Marvel universe as a member of the Serpent Squad.

== In other media ==
Black Mamba appears in the Marvel Future Avengers episode "Mission Black Market Auction", voiced by Hana Takeda in the original Japanese version and by Colleen O'Shaughnessey in the English dub. This version is a member of B.A.D. Girls, Inc.
