= Serpent Society =

Marvel Comics supervillain group

Publication information
- Publisher: Marvel Comics
- First appearance: Captain America #310 (Oct. 1985)
- Created by: Mark Gruenwald (writer); Paul Neary (artist)

In-story information
- Base(s): Various
- Member(s): See Membership

The Serpent Society is an organization of snake-themed supervillains appearing in American comic books published by Marvel Comics. The society is a continuation of the original group the Serpent Squad and was later changed into Serpent Solutions. The Serpent Society first appeared in Captain America #310 (October 1985) and was created by writer Mark Gruenwald and artist Paul Neary. Serpent Solutions first appeared in Captain America: Sam Wilson #1 by writer Nick Spencer and artist Daniel Acuña.

The Serpent Society have appeared in various media outside comics, including the animated series The Avengers: Earth's Mightiest Heroes and Marvel Disk Wars: The Avengers and the Marvel Cinematic Universe film Captain America: Brave New World.

== Publication history ==
The Serpent Society is formed by Sidewinder as he gathers a number of villains with snake-themed powers. The group is organized as a supervillain labor union, with the members providing protection for each other, sharing profits, and organizing profitable crimes. The Society works, on an as-needed basis, for criminal organizations such as Hydra, the Maggia, the Kingpin, and A.I.M. Some of these jobs bring the Serpent Society into conflict with Captain America and his partners. At one point, the Viper takes control of the Society, plotting to take control of the United States, but is foiled by Captain America, D-Man, Nomad, the Falcon and former members of the Serpent Society.

As part of the All-New Marvel NOW! branding, a resurrected Viper (Jordan Stryke) takes control of the Serpent Society. He reorganizes the group as "Serpent Solutions" and provides their services to various corporations. Serpent Solutions is opposed by the new Captain America, formerly known as Falcon.

=== Concept and creation ===
The Serpent Society first appeared in Captain America #310 (Oct. 1985) and was created by Mark Gruenwald and Paul Neary. Serpent Solutions first appeared in Captain America: Sam Wilson #1 by writer Nick Spencer and artist Daniel Acuña.

Most of the villains Mark Gruenwald introduced in Captain America were created to symbolize aspects of contemporary American culture and the world political situation. In the case of the Serpent Society, Gruenwald created them to symbolize trade unions.

== Fictional team history ==
=== Formation ===
The Serpent Society was founded by Sidewinder, and was a descendant of sorts from the two original Serpent Squads. The first Squad consisted of the original Viper, his brother the original Eel, and Cobra. The second Squad consisted of the second Viper (Madame Hydra), Eel, Princess Python, Cobra, and Krang. Sidewinder led the third incarnation of the Squad that included Anaconda, Black Mamba, and Death Adder. They were to retrieve the fabled Serpent Crown from its then-underwater grave. Sidewinder used his cloak and abandoned his comrades during an underwater mishap and proceeded to collect the reward for the Serpent Crown.

Anaconda, Mamba and Adder survived and confronted Sidewinder. During that time, Sidewinder had invested the money and started the groundwork for the Serpent Society. The Society was to provide its members with better access to technology, bigger access to jobs, higher pay, comradeship, safe lodging, and a host of other benefits. Most importantly, with Sidewinder's teleportation cloak, members never had to fear imprisonment again. It was, essentially, a supervillain labor union.

After persuading his former comrades of his true intention to better their lot (and paying their share of the reward plus interest), he had them contact other snake-themed criminals which included Asp, Diamondback, Constrictor, Cobra, Princess Python, Viper, Rattler, Cottonmouth, and Bushmaster. The Viper refused to attend the first initial gathering. Constrictor, unimpressed with the proceedings, walked out and tried to turn the group over to the Avengers.

Sidewinder, Anaconda, Black Mamba, Death Adder, Asp, Diamondback, Cottonmouth, Cobra, Bushmaster, Rattler, and Princess Python became charter members of the Serpent Society. They headquartered at Serpent Citadel which was an abandoned mental hospital located in upstate New York. Sidewinder sent them out to contact various criminal organizations including Hydra, the Maggia, Kingpin, and A.I.M., they received their first paying assignment: the elimination of their former leader MODOK. The Society's success in killing MODOK cemented their reputation as criminal talents of the first caliber. Captain America intervened many times during their early years, but was never able to put them out of commission.

Two charter members soon left the Society. Princess Python fled during the MODOK assignment and was soon after expelled from their ranks. Death Adder was killed by the Scourge of the Underworld when he was sent to ransom the Princess to her Circus of Crime cohorts.

Later, the Viper sent a fourth Serpent Squad (though not named as such) consisting of Copperhead, Black Racer, Fer-de-Lance, and Puff Adder to infiltrate the Society with the intention of assassinating Sidewinder and setting herself up as the rightful leader. When the four were taken to Serpent Citadel by Sidewinder, it was easy for the rest of the Viper's allies (Coachwhip, Boomslang, Slither, and Rock Python), to assault the place. Many of the charter members went turncoat and supported the Viper, whereas the Asp, Black Mamba, Bushmaster, and Diamondback remained loyal to Sidewinder.

The Viper used the Society and its resources to poison the water supply of Washington DC, which turned its citizens into snake-men. The ensuing chaos nearly destroyed the capital. Diamondback managed to escape with Sidewinder and solicited help from Captain America, Demolition Man, Nomad, Falcon, and Vagabond. The team stormed Serpent Citadel, rescued the Society members who were loyal to Sidewinder, and captured many others. The Viper, however managed to escape.

In the end, Cobra subdued the Viper and turned her over to the Captain on the condition that he allowed the Serpent Society 24 hours to evacuate from their headquarters. When the Captain refused the deal the Cobra turned Viper over anyway.

Bitter over the betrayal, Sidewinder left the Society and the Cobra became its new leader, eventually calling himself King Cobra. With the exception of Slither and the Viper herself, all of the Viper's agents remained with the Society. The Society re-located to a new secret headquarters in the Bronx.

=== The trial ===
Shortly afterwards, Diamondback became romantically involved with Captain America and tried to leave the Society altogether to be with him. Despite the fact that she was a member of a criminal organization that he desperately wanted to put out of commission, Captain America did not force her to betray her companions. The Society, however, had Diamondback under surveillance, and when they realized she had been seeing Captain America socially, certain members demanded that she should be put on trial for treason.

Diamondback was found guilty. Every member voted for her death except for Asp, Black Mamba, Bushmaster and Rock Python. Penalty was death by injection, but King Cobra said he would commute the sentence if she would cooperate with them by revealing the true identity of Captain America. Diamondback refused but Black Mamba secretly alerted Sidewinder, who teleported in to save Diamondback at the last moment.

Diamondback, seeking revenge against the Society, sought out Paladin when Captain America could not guarantee that Black Mamba and Asp be given immunity from arrest. The two infiltrated the Society's headquarters, only to be captured along with Mamba and Asp. Captain America, on the other hand, from his sky cycle, spotted a Serpent Saucer piloted by Cottonmouth and Fer-de-Lance, which was heading back to the Society's hideout. Cap entered the hideout along with the saucer and quickly subdued the two Serpents. He quickly freed Diamondback, Paladin, Mamba and Asp and together they brought down the Society. All members were taken to prison with the exception of Diamondback, Asp, and Mamba (Asp and Mamba eventually were given immunity from arrest due to their help in defeating their former colleagues). Anaconda, Puff Adder and Rock Python escaped capture, as they were not at the headquarters at the time. Boomslang was in the hospital after being shot by thugs around this period. Puff Adder and Rock Python were eventually imprisoned after being thrown out of their Serpent Saucer by MODAM. Anaconda, Black Mamba, Asp, and Diamondback were all invited by MODAM to join the Femizons. Afterwards, Mamba, Asp, and Diamondback formed a new team called BAD Girls, Inc. with fellow Femizon Impala.

After spending time in prison, the Society re-formed again, going back to their old ways. Another encounter with Captain America and the now defunct team called Force Works seemed to have permanently put them out of commission; both Puff Adder and Black Mamba later said that the Society had disbanded.

=== Avengers Disassembled ===
However, the Society re-formed yet again in the Captain America/Avengers Disassembled tie-ins. King Cobra, Rattler, Bushmaster, and a new Death Adder had aided the Thunderbolts during the Civil War storyline. After that, the four villains have been identified as members of the 142 registered superheroes who appear on the cover of the comic book Avengers: The Initiative #1. Anaconda served with the Six Pack and was later defeated by the New Warriors; Diamondback, Black Mamba, and Asp had reformed BAD Girls, Inc.; Cottonmouth had not been seen since he broke free from prison with Hawkeye, but was later taken back into custody by S.H.I.E.L.D.

=== Other activities ===
During the 2008 "Secret Invasion" storyline in which a race of alien shapeshifters known as the Skrulls were discovered to have engaged in a subversive, long-term invasion of Earth, the Serpent Society took a number of civilians hostage in a compound in the American Midwest, claiming they were protecting themselves from the Skrulls. Nova and his Nova Corps deputies defeated them in seconds.

The Serpent Society appeared in the 2012 "Avengers vs. X-Men" storyline, during which they were confronted by the X-Men. They were next seen battling Taskmaster and Deadpool after they were contracted by Leviathan to capture Marcus Johnson.

Subsequently, Sidewinder returned to lead the Serpent Society, which, during one endeavor, attacked the superhero group being protected by Elektra. Having studied the Serpent Society and its members while working for S.H.I.E.L.D., Elektra was able to defeat the Society.

As part of Marvel Comics' 2015 All-New, All-Different Marvel initiative, Jordan Stryke, also known as the Viper, returned from the dead and became leader of the Serpent Society. He rebranded the group as a criminal business called Serpent Solutions which now includes new member Piet Voorhees who was turned into the new Cobra by his uncle King Cobra. The Serpent Society later came into conflict with Sam Wilson, who had assumed the identity of Captain America, and his allies, which included the now-retired Diamondback After their plans were foiled, the Serpent Society were arrested by the authorities.

Most of the members of Serpent Solutions escaped from prison and reunited during the 2017 "Secret Empire" storyline, including Slither, who rejoined the group as they become members of Hydra's Army of Evil.

The Serpent Society was next seen working with the brand new Constrictor, the original's son. He had stolen the Book of the Iron Fist and planned to sell it to Iron Fist's enemy Choshin. This led to a battle between the serpents, Choshin's samurais, and Iron Fist and Sabretooth. Iron Fist and Coachwhip were the last two fighters standing, and Coachwhip revealed that the Society did not know it was not the real Constrictor and that he had not told them where he hid the book.

During the Thing's bachelor party, Johnny Storm unwittingly hired the female Serpent Society members as strippers. Anaconda, Asp, Black Mamba, Black Racer, Fer-de-Lance, and Princess Python jumped out of the Thing's cake and battled Thing and his superhuman guests, including Captain America, Iron Man, Thor, Black Panther, Doctor Strange, Luke Cage, Spider-Man, Rocket Raccoon, and Thundra, among others. The ladies of the Serpent Society were eventually defeated and taken into custody.

In the "Hunted" storyline, many members of the Serpent Society are captured by Kraven the Hunter, Taskmaster, and Black Ant and forced to participate in a murderous hunt set up by Arcade. After the hunt begins, the Society attempt to battle the robotic drones being controlled by the wealthy participants, but realize that they are outmatched and flee. The Serpent Society manage to escape the hunt, but are subdued by the Avengers and the Fantastic Four.

During the "Devil's Reign" storyline, Coachwhip and Puff Adder appear as members of Wilson Fisk's incarnation of the Thunderbolts when Fisk had outlawed superhero activity. They alongside the Thunderbolts unit with them attack Spider-Woman, only to be fought off.

The Serpent Society members Anaconda, Asp, Black Mamba, Bushmaster, Coachwhip, Cobra, Copperhead, Cottonmouth, Death Adder, Fer-de-Lance, Princess Python, Puff Adder, Rattler, Rock Python, Slither, Viper started killing and throwing bodies into an offering pile at their old Serpent Solutions lair in the "name of the serpent". Their worshiping is crashed by Nighthawk. The Avengers also arrive and find that Nighthawk defeated them. The portal that the Serpent Society opened with their worshiping summoned Mephisto. The Serpent Society later escaped from police custody and started killing people while making their way across the Brooklyn Bridge causing the Avengers to take action.

Viper changes his name to Pit Viper and reorganizes the Serpent Society into a cult dedicated to worshiping Mephisto. Pit Viper orchestrates several crises around the world to keep the Avengers Emergency Response Squad distracted while dispatching his new recruit Tiger Snake to lead raids for components needed for the Serpent's Tears, which Pit Viper boasts will not only be powerful and profitable weapons but will honor Mephisto. They obtained that involves Griever's Swill and German whale oil. In addition, he is also shown to have another recruit in the Serpent Society named Titanoboa. When Pit Viper sets off the Serpent's Tears, Captain America throws himself into it to protect Shang-Chi and is turned into a humanoid snake. After the Avengers defeat the Serpent Society, Wonder Man uses his energy to cure Captain America.

== Membership ==
The membership of the Serpent Society has included:

=== Founding members ===
Member	First appearance	Description
Sidewinder	Marvel Two-in-One #64 (June 1980)	Seth Voelker is a former economics professor and the founder of the Serpent Society who can teleport using his cloak. He was the group's leader until Viper's Serpent Squad infiltrated the Society, after which he retired and left leadership to Cobra. Years later, he donned the Sidewinder costume once again and took leadership of the Serpent Society as they were hired by the Assassin's Guild to track down the mercenary Elektra. He is based on the sidewinder.
Anaconda	Marvel Two-in-One #64 (June 1980)	Blanche Sitznski is a former steelworker from Pittsburgh, Pennsylvania who received cybernetic surgery from the Roxxon Corporation that gave her powerful tentacle-like arms and legs that she uses to constrict her foes. They also implanted gills that allowed her to breathe underwater. While not working with the Society, Anaconda has been known to work as a freelance mercenary with several other teams. She is based on the anaconda.
Asp	Captain America #310 (Oct. 1985)	Cleo Nefertiti is a mutant and former stripper who generates a paralytic energy which is fatal to those who remained in close contact with her for prolonged periods of time. She can channel this energy into electrical blasts, which she called her "venom bursts" or "venom bolts" that can stun or paralyze living beings. She is based on the asp.
Black Mamba	Marvel Two-in-One #64 (June 1980)	Tanya Sealy is a former call girl. She has a limited form of telepathy that enables her to scan the thoughts of nearby individuals, usually to find an image of someone that the person holds dear. She then manifests the Darkforce into the image of that cherished person, which in turn, almost hypnotically seduces its target into embracing it. Once physical contact is established, Mamba then lets the Darkforce constrict her victims to death, or at the very least, into unconsciousness. Often the victim is in too deep a state of ecstasy or euphoria to even notice. She is based on the black mamba.
Bushmaster	Captain America #310 (Oct. 1985)	Quincy McIver is a quadriplegic who possesses cybernetic limbs: two arms and a tail in the place of the lower half of his body. He lost his arms and legs in a boating accident while trying to evade the police underwater. Shortly later, the Roxxon Corporation equipped him with bionic arms and a snake-like tail. McIver took the name "Bushmaster" from his brother John, who was killed in battle with Luke Cage. He is based on the bushmaster.
Cobra / King Cobra	Journey into Mystery #98 (Nov. 1963)	Klaus Voorhees is a former lab assistant, longtime Thor foe and partner of Mister Hyde. He possesses superhuman speed and a great degree of flexibility, enabling him to contort his body into almost any shape. He also supplements these abilities with an array of weaponry, mainly his multi-purpose wrist launchers. After Sidewinder retires, Cobra becomes King Cobra and the leader of the Society. Cobra is based on the cobra and the king cobra.
Cottonmouth	Captain America #310 (Oct. 1985)	Burchell Clemens is a supervillain with bionic jaws and steel teeth. He can extend his lower jaw up to a foot from his upper jaw. His jaws possess superhuman strength and extremely sharp fangs. He is based on the cottonmouth or water moccasin.
Death Adder	Marvel Two-in-One #64 (June 1980)	Roland Burroughs is a mute killer. He possessed extended talons which contained deadly venom, he was bioengineered with a poison-spiked bionic tail, and was totally amphibious. Soon after the Serpent Society's first few missions, Death Adder was killed by the Scourge of the Underworld. He was revived by the Hood, but was killed again by Agent Venom while serving in the Crime Master's Savage Six. He is based on the death adder.
Diamondback	Captain America #310 (Oct. 1985)	Rachel Leighton is an acrobat who uses diamond-shaped throwing blades, many of which are equipped with anything from poison, explosives, narcotics, and acid. She defected from the team and eventually became the partner and lover of Captain America. She is based on the western diamondback rattlesnake.
Princess Python	The Amazing Spider-Man #22 (March 1965)	Zelda DuBois is a professional criminal and snake charmer. She is a member of the Circus of Crime who has control over a large python. When the Serpent Society was hired to kill MODOK, the Princess lost her nerve and abandoned her peers during the assignment to track him down. Eventually, the Society caught up with her, and Sidewinder had her mind wiped and expelled her from the Society. Several years later, she rejoined the Serpent Society under the new leadership and title of Serpent Solutions.
Rattler	Captain America #310 (Oct. 1985)	Gustav Krueger is a Polish criminal with a bionic tail that can generate vibrations. He was killed by the new Scourge of the Underworld, though what appears to be a new Rattler has since reappeared with the Serpent Solutions. He is based on the rattlesnake.

=== Viper's agents ===
Member	First appearance	Description
Viper	Captain America #110 (1969)	Ophelia Sarkissian, otherwise known as Madame Hydra, is the second person to use the codename of Viper. She began using the codename after she killed the original Viper (Jordan Stryke). Some time after Sidewinder had formed the Serpent Society, Viper caught wind of it and used her own criminals (Copperhead, Fer-de-Lance, Puff Adder, and Black Racer) to infiltrate the group. She caused dissension among the Serpents, with several of the original members joining Viper's side. Together, they ousted Sidewinder and those loyal to him. However, Viper's leadership of the Society was short-lived, as Captain America thwarted her plans. Cobra eventually defeated Viper, which prompted him to take over the organization. She has since abandoned the idea of leading the group and has not been seen with them since. She is based on the viper.
Black Racer	Captain America #337 (Jan. 1988)	Ariana Siddiqi can run and move at superhuman speeds. She was a member of the fourth Serpent Squad along with Copperhead, Fer-de-Lance, and Puff Adder. She is based on the black racer.
Boomslang	Captain America #341 (May 1988)	Marc Riemer is an Australian criminal who uses snake-shaped boomerangs, which he called his "serpent-rangs". He is also a skilled unarmed combatant. He joined the Serpent Society during Madame Hydra's takeover. After he was shot by gang members while sent to spy on Diamondback, Boomslang left the Serpent Society for several years. He rejoined the group under its new name of Serpent Solutions. He is based on the boomslang.
Coachwhip	Captain America #341 (May 1988)	Beatrix Keener is a woman who wields metal-linked whips with the ability to generate electricity. She, along with Boomslang and Rock Python, infiltrated the Serpent Society during Madame Hydra's takeover. She stayed with the organization after Madame Hydra's defeat, and began a relationship with King Cobra when he became the new leader. She is based on the coachwhip.
Copperhead	Captain America #337 (Jan. 1988)	Davis Lawfers is the leader of the so-called fourth Serpent Squad (consisting also of Fer-de-Lance, Black Racer, and Puff Adder), and one of Madame Hydra's most loyal minions. When the Cobra became the new leader of the Society, Copperhead left the group for many years. He has since returned with the Serpent Society under new leadership. Copperhead has no superhuman powers but is equipped with a pair of gauntlets which fire power blasts and poisoned darts. For protection he wears a suit of copper-colored scale mail. He is based on the copperhead.
Fer-de-Lance	Captain America #337 (Jan. 1988)	Teresa Vasquez is a professional assassin hailing from Puerto Rico. Fer-de-lance has a pair of retractable "fangs" similar to that of Bushmaster's. Along with Copperhead, Black Racer, and Puff Adder, Fer-de-Lance worked for Madame Hydra as part of the fourth Serpent Squad. When Sidewinder invited the quartet to join the Serpent Society, Madame Hydra began her takeover, but it failed. Despite this, Fer-de-Lance continued working for the Serpent Society. She is based on the fer-de-lance.
Puff Adder	Captain America #337 (Jan. 1988)	Gordon "Gordo" Fraley is a mutant with the power to breathe various debilitative gases and inflate his body mass to a certain extent. He is based on the puff adder.
Rock Python	Captain America #341 (May 1988)	M'Gula is a metallurgist from South Africa that served the terrorist known as the Viper. His body is as hard as his namesake and he throws "snake eggs" that burst upon impact, sending out entangling strands of metallic tendrils. At one point, Rock Python attempted to retire from villainy and work as a security guard, but he has since returned to the Serpent Society when they were taken over by Jordan Stryke and renamed Serpent Solutions. He is based on the African rock python.
Slither	Captain America Annual #4 (1977)	Aaron Salomon is a mutant who had previously been a member of Mutant Force. He has the head of a snake while the rest of his body is humanoid. He briefly worked alongside the Serpent Society when Madame Hydra infiltrated the group. After his defeat, he left the Society to rejoin Mutant Force, but has recently rejoined the group.

=== Later members ===
Member	First appearance	Description
Constrictor	Infamous Iron Man #7 (June 2017)	The unnamed son of Frank Payne became the second Constrictor. He was a member of the Serpent Society during his fight with Iron Fist. He is based on the boa constrictor.
Death Adder	Nova (vol. 4) #19 (Jan. 2009)	Theodore Scott is the second criminal to take the Death Adder mantle. Unlike Roland Burroughs, the surgery to transform him into Death Adder did not cause muteness. He was first seen working as part of the Thunderbolts with Serpent Society members King Cobra, Rattler, and Bushmaster. He has since been a permanent member of the Serpent Society, and later Serpent Solutions, though very little is known about him.
Sidewinder	Iron Fist (vol. 3) #1 (July 1998)	A second, unnamed Sidewinder was employed by the Serpent Society, but was killed on a mission working for Death-Sting.
Sidewinder	Captain America #31 (vol. 4) (Nov. 2004)	Gregory Bryan was the third man to take the codename Sidewinder, and has the same abilities as the original. He has been seen working for King Cobra, though when Seth Voelkner, the original Sidewinder, returned to a life of crime, it is unknown if Gregory Bryan continued with the Serpent Society.
Viper/Pit Viper	Captain America #157 (1973)	Jordan Stryke is the brother of Leopold Stryke, the first Eel, and leader of the original Serpent Squad. He was killed by Madame Hydra, who began using the Viper moniker. He has since returned under unknown circumstances, taking leadership of the Serpent Society and re-branding it as Serpent Solutions. Viper would later take on the name of Pit Viper and reorganize the Serpent Society as a cult for Mephisto. He is based on the viper and pit viper.
Tiger Snake	Avengers Assemble (vol. 3) #1 (2024)	Tiger Snake is an unnamed martial artist of East Asian descent who possesses the ability to generate a lethal poison from his hands that he calls the "Tiger Snake's Bite". He was personally recruited by Pit Viper and is a dedicated worshipper of Mephisto. He is based on the tiger snake.
Titanoboa	Avengers Assemble (vol. 3) #1 (2024)	Titanoboa is an unnamed criminal with size-shifting abilities which greatly increase his strength and durability. Along with Tiger Snake, he was personally recruited by Pit Viper and is a dedicated worshipper of Mephisto. He is based on the prehistoric snake Titanoboa.

== Other versions ==
=== Earth-33900 ===
An alternate universe iteration of the Serpent Society from Earth-33900 appears in The Avengers American Armed Forces Exclusive #13, consisting of Cobra, Viper, Eel, Death Adder, and Anaconda.

=== Exiles ===
An alternate universe iteration of the Serpent Society from Earth-27537 appears in Exiles #89, consisting of Cobra, Anaconda, Bushmaster, Death Adder, Cottonmouth, Diamondback, Rattler, Sidewinder, and an unnamed woman.

=== Marvel Adventures ===
Two iterations of the Serpent Society appears in Marvel Adventures, with the first group consisting of the Sons of the Serpents while the second consists of Sidewinder, Cobra, Anaconda, and Cottonmouth.

=== Marvel Super Hero Adventures ===
An alternate universe iteration of the Serpent Society appears in Marvel Super Hero Adventures, consisting of King Cobra, Anaconda, Bushmaster, Asp, and Princess Python. Additionally, an original character named Garden Snake appears as a new recruit before reforming with help from Spider-Man and Ms. Marvel.

=== Spider-Bot Infinity Comic ===
An alternate universe iteration of the Serpent Society appears in Spider-Bot Infinity Comic #9, consisting of Anaconda, Cottonmouth, Rattler, and Puff Adder.

=== Ultimate Marvel ===
A gang based on the Serpent Society called the Serpent Skulls appears in All-New Ultimates. consisting of Crossbones, Diamondback, Black Racer, Sidewinder, Death Adder, King Cobra, Bushmaster, and Anaconda; who are all served by underlings dressed in specific attire such as chauffeurs, ninjas, punks, and an all-female biker gang.

== In other media ==
=== Television ===
- The Serpent Society appears in The Avengers: Earth's Mightiest Heroes, consisting of King Cobra, Anaconda, Bushmaster, Death Adder, Rattler, Constrictor, and Viper.
- The Serpent Society appears in Marvel Disk Wars: The Avengers, consisting of King Cobra, Diamondback, Cottonmouth, and Death Adder.

=== Film ===
- In a press conference held on October 28, 2014 covering Phase Three of the Marvel Cinematic Universe, Marvel Studios president Kevin Feige initially announced that the sequel to Captain America: The Winter Soldier would be titled Captain America: Serpent Society as a red herring before revealing the film's real title as Captain America: Civil War.
- The Serpent Society, referred to as Serpent in the film itself, appear in the MCU film Captain America: Brave New World, depicted as a violent mercenary group led by Sidewinder and Copperhead. Additionally, Diamondback and King Cobra were meant to appear, before their scenes were cut from the film during reshoots.

=== Video games ===
The Serpent Society appear in the Captain America: The Winter Soldier tie-in game, consisting of King Cobra, Diamondback, and Puff Adder.

=== Miscellaneous ===
The Serpent Society appear in the novel Marvel Avengers: The Serpent Society, by Pat Shand and published by Joe Books Ltd. in 2017. This version of the group is led by Black Mamba and consists of Anaconda, Bushmaster, Asp, King Cobra, Fer-de-Lance, Puff Adder, and Copperhead.
