= Death adder =

Death adder may refer to:

In herpetology:

- All members of the genus Acanthophis, a group of highly venomous elapids found in Australia and New Guinea

In fiction:

- Death Adder (character), a supervillain from Marvel Comics
- Death Adder, a fictional antagonist in the Golden Axe series of video games
