= Femizons =

Fictional comic book groups

Femizon is the name of two fictional groups appearing in American comic books published by Marvel Comics.

== Fictional team history ==
=== Earth-712 Femizons ===
Femizons

Publication information
- Publisher: Marvel Comics
- First appearance: Savage Tales #1 (May 1971)
- Created by: Stan Lee; John Romita Sr.

In-story information
- Member(s): Princess Lyra; Syrani; Thundra

The first group to be called Femizons consist of the women of Femizonia, a gynarchic future world in an alternate timeline where women had become Amazon-like warriors, ruling over male slaves. Thundra, a recurring enemy and ally of the Fantastic Four, originates from Earth-712.

=== Earth-616 Femizons ===
Femizons

Publication information
- Publisher: Marvel Comics
- First appearance: Captain America #386 (June 1991)
- Created by: Mark Gruenwald; Rik Levins

In-story information
- Member(s): Membership

The second group to be called Femizons is a group of all-female supervillains on Earth-616. They were enemies mainly for Captain America, and their goal was to conquer Earth and create a utopia where women ruled. Led by Superia, who claimed to be inspired by stories of Thundra's Femizons, the group consisted of a large number of established female criminals and super villainesses. Superia gained Blackbird, Iron Maiden, MODAM, Moonstone, and Nightshade as her lieutenants.

== Members ==
=== Earth-712 version ===
- Princess Lyra
- Syrani
- Thundra

=== Earth-616 version ===
Member	First appearance	Description
Superia	Captain America #387 (July 1991)	Deidre Wentworth is the founder of the Femizons. A brilliant scientist with superhuman strength (on par with Captain Marvel), durability, and the ability of flight, Wentworth took the codename Superia and banded together Earth's mightiest female villains in a plot to gain power. She later became the head of H.A.M.M.E.R., and served as Ms. Marvel in Norman Osborn's Dark Avengers.
Anaconda	Marvel Two-In-One #64 (June 1980)	Blanche Sitznski is a mercenary often associated with the Serpent Society. Anaconda has the ability to elongate her limbs which she uses to constrict her enemies with her superhuman strength. She can also breathe underwater and possesses super-regenerative abilities. While aboard Superia's cruise ship, Anaconda brawled with her teammate Quicksand.
Arclight	Uncanny X-Men #210 (October 1986)	Philippa Sontag is a mutant assassin and member of the Marauders. A war veteran, Arclight has the mutant ability to create shockwaves upon physical impact in addition to superhuman strength.
Asp	Captain America #310 (October 1985)	Cleo Nefertiti is a mutant criminal and member of the Serpent Society. Asp possesses the ability to fire paralyzing bolts from her hands. Asp defected from the Femizons alongside Black Mamba and Diamondback, aiding Captain America and Nomad against the group.
Battleaxe	Thing #33 (March 1986)	Anita Ehren is a former wrestler and member of the Grapplers who uses an axe as her weapon of choice.
Black Lotus	Marvel Fanfare #11 (November 1983)	An Asian assassin and enemy of Black Widow.
Black Mamba	Marvel Two-In-One #64 (June 1980)	Tanya Sealy is a member of the Serpent Society and BAD Girls, Inc. She has the ability to pluck the image of her victim's loved one and use Darkforce to embody that person, eventually suffocating them.
Blackbird	Incredible Hulk #274 (August 1982)	Heather O'Gara is an enemy of the Hulk. Formerly known as Jackdaw, Blackbird served the Leader before becoming one of Superia's lieutenants in the Femizons. She is equipped with mechanical wings enabling her to fly and wields an array of weaponry.
Bloodlust	Marvel Comics Presents #49 (May 1990)	Beatta Dubiel is a ferocious member of the Femme Fatales. She has enhanced strength, speed, agility, and senses.
Bombshell	Hawkeye #3 (November 1983)	Wendy Conrad is a Hawkeye enemy and expert juggler that uses explosives.
Chimera	Captain America #390 (August 1991)	A metamorph that can grow wings and claws.
Dansen Macabre	Marvel Team-Up #93 (May 1980)	A hypnotist who kills her victims by dancing.
Diamondback	Captain America #310 (October 1985)	Rachel Leighton is a member of the Serpent Society and BAD Girls, Inc.. She throws diamonds laced with a variety of chemicals (acid, poison). Diamondback is also an ex-girlfriend of Captain America.
Dragonfly	X-Men #94 (August, 1975)	Veronica Dultry is a villainess with flight and hypnotic abilities.
Ferocia	Marvel Premiere #15 (May, 1974)	An Iron Fist villain who was magically-evolved from a K'un-L'un wolf.
Frenzy	X-Factor #4 (May 1986)	Joanna Cargill is a super-strong mutant with steel-hard skin. She has been a member of the Alliance of Evil, Acolytes, and X-Men.
Gladiatrix	Thing #33 (March, 1986)	Robin Braxton is a member of the Grapplers and a professional wrestler with super strength.
Golddigger	Captain America #389 (August, 1991)	Angela Golden is a Captain America villain that has no super powers, but has athletic and martial arts abilities. She mostly relies on her feminine charm.
Gypsy Moth	Spider-Woman #10 (January 1979)	Sybil Dvorak is a moth-themed villain who has the ability to fly and manipulate various organic objects.
Ice Princess	Captain America #387 (July 1991)	A villain with the ability to generate and control ice.
Impala	Captain America #388 (July 1991)	An African javelin thrower and former member of BAD Girls, Inc.
Ion	Machine Man #15 (June 1980)	Voletta Todd is a Fantastic Four villain and the niece of Blazing Skull who projects electromagnetic energy.
Iron Maiden	Marvel Fanfare #11 (November 1983)	Melina Vostokoff is a Russian assassin and longtime enemy of Black Widow. She wears an armored metal suit that protects her from physical harm. Iron Maiden served as one of Superia's lieutenants in the Femizons.
Karisma	Fantastic Four #266 (May, 1984)	Mary Brown is a Fantastic Four villainess that uses radiation wavelengths to become irresistible to men.
Knockout	Amazing Spider-Man #340 (October 1990)	Elizabeth Rawson is a super-strong woman and member of the Femme Fatales.
Mindblast	Amazing Spider-Man #340 (October 1990)	Danielle Forte is a member of the Femme Fatales with telekinetic abilities.
MODAM	West Coast Avengers #36 (September 1988)	Olinka Barankova is a MODOK-like super-genius created by A.I.M. with various psionic abilities.
Moonstone	Captain America #192 (December 1975)	Dr. Karla Sofen is a former psychiatrist and current supervillain. She has been known to work with several supervillain groups such as the Masters of Evil, the Thunderbolts, and the Dark Avengers. One of Superia's lieutenants, Moonstone possessed the abilities of flight, intangibility, emitting light, and projection of energy blasts.
Mysteria	Captain America #387 (July 1991)	Mysteria Winters is a villainess that uses mist as her weapon.
Nightshade	Captain America #164 (August 1973)	Tilda Johnson is a Captain America villainess and second-in-command of the Femizons. She is a mad scientist who has the ability to secrete pheromones.
Pink Pearl	Alpha Flight #22 (May 1985)	An obese Alpha Flight villain with above-average strength.
Poundcakes	Marvel Two-In-One #54 (August 1979)	A member of the "Grapplers" who can create tremors with her boots.
Princess Python	Amazing Spider-Man #22 (March 1965)	Zelda DuBois is a member of the Serpent Society and the Circus of Crime. Has a pet boa constrictor.
Quicksand	Thor #392 (June 1988)	A woman with super strength and the ability to turn her body into sand.
Screaming Mimi	Marvel Two-In-One #54 (August 1979)	Melissa Gold is a member of the Thunderbolts who had (then) a sonic scream.
Snapdragon	Marvel Fanfare #12 (January 1984)	Sheoke Sanada is a martial artist and long-time enemy of Diamondback.
Steel Wind	Ghost Rider #75 (December 1982)	A Ghost Rider villain, a cyborg with enhanced strength and durability.
Titania	Marvel Super Heroes Secret Wars #3 (July 1984)	Mary MacPherran possesses super strength and durability, and is married to the Absorbing Man.
Vapor	Incredible Hulk #254 (December 1980)	Ann Darnell is a member of the U-Foes who can transform into any gaseous matter.
Vertigo	Marvel Fanfare #1 (March 1982)	A member of the Savage Land Mutates and Marauders who can cause nausea and disorientation.
Water Witch	Fantastic Four Annual #13 (December 1978)	A servant of the Mole Man and member of the Outcasts. She is a woman that can control water.
Whiplash	Marvel Comics Presents #49 (May 1990)	Leeann Foreman is a member of the Femme Fatales with whips extending from her gloves.
Whiteout	Uncanny X-Men #249 (October 1989)	A Savage Land Mutate with the ability to project beams of light, often blinding her enemies.
Wrangler	Marvel Fanfare #11 (November 1983)	Laralie is a Black Widow villainess who uses cowboy-themed weapons.
Yellowjacket	Avengers #264 (February 1986)	Rita DeMara was an initial Avengers enemy and later member of both the Avengers and Guardians of the Galaxy who could shrink her body and also project bioelectric blasts.
