= Rock python =

Rock python may refer to:

- Central African rock python (Python sebae), a non-venomous snake species found in sub-Saharan Africa
- Southern African rock python (Python natalensis), a non-venomous snake of southern Africa, closely related to the Central African rock python
- Indian python or Asiatic rock python (Python molurus), a non-venomous snake species found in southern Asia
- Rock Python, a fictional comic book character
