= Hugh Jones (comics) =

- Hugh Jones as seen in Iron Man: The Iron Age #2.

Publication information
- Publisher: Marvel Comics
- First appearance: Captain America #180 (Dec. 1974)
- Created by: Steve Englehart (Writer); Sal Buscema (Artist)

In-story information
- Species: Human
- Team affiliations: Roxxon

Hugh Jones is a fictional character appearing in American comic books published by Marvel Comics.

The character appeared in the Marvel Cinematic Universe live-action series Agent Carter, portrayed by Ray Wise.

== Publication history ==
Hugh Jones first appeared in Captain America #180 (Dec. 1974), and was created by Steve Englehart and Sal Buscema.

== Fictional character biography ==
Hugh Jones was the son of a Texas oil millionaire and inherited the company Republic Oil & Gas after his father’s death. With Jones's approval, Republic Oil & Gas' executives (John Gamelin, Jonas Hale, and Simon Krieger) arrange the murders of Howard Stark and Maria Stark in an attempt to take over Stark Industries, which is foiled by Iron Man. Republic Oil & Gas is renamed Roxxon in a bid to overcome the company's bad publicity.

Jones is later kidnapped by the Serpent Squad (consisting of Viper, Eel, Cobra, and Princess Python). He is given the Serpent Crown, which causes him to fall under the control of Set. The Serpent Squad takes Jones to an oil derrick in the central Pacific Ocean, where he attempts to raise the sunken city of Lemuria from underwater. The police, along with Nomad and Namor the Sub-Mariner, interrupt the Serpent Squad's plan. Krang reclaims the Crown and flees, with Jones maintaining a link to Set despite the Crown's loss. He contacts the Serpent Cartel, acolytes of Set from Earth-712.

Using the Brand Corporation's and Roxxon's facilities, Jones retrieves the Serpent Crown of Earth-712. Using both Crowns, Jones takes control of the residents of Washington, D.C. and places them under Set's control. He is confronted by the Thing, Stingray, and Scarlet Witch, who remove the Crown from Jones's head. Following his separation from the Crown, Jones is driven insane and is placed in a mental hospital.

== In other media ==
Hugh Jones appears in Agent Carter, portrayed by Ray Wise. This version is the President of the Roxxon Oil Corporation in the 1940s and a former friend of Howard Stark. In the second season, Jones appears as a member of the Council of Nine.
