= Iron Maiden (Marvel Comics) =

Fictional character appearing in American comic books published by Marvel Comics

Publication information
- Publisher: Marvel Comics
- First appearance: Marvel Fanfare #11 (November 1983)
- Created by: Ralph Macchio; George Pérez

In-story information
- Alter ego: Melina Vostokova (Russian: Мелина Востокова)
- Species: Human
- Team affiliations: Thunderbolts; Femizons; Remont Six
- Notable aliases: Melina Von Vostokoff
- Abilities: Iron suit increasing strength and durability; Master martial artist and assassin; Skilled hand-to-hand combatant; Mastery of various weapons

Iron Maiden (born as Melina Vostokova; Melina Von Vostokoff; Мелина Востокова) is a supervillain appearing in American comic books published by Marvel Comics. Created by Ralph Macchio and George Pérez, the character first appeared in Marvel Fanfare #11 (November 1983). The character is Russian and is depicted most notably as an enemy of Black Widow.

The character made her live-action debut in the Marvel Cinematic Universe film Black Widow, portrayed by Rachel Weisz.

== Publication history ==
Iron Maiden first appeared in Marvel Fanfare #11 (November 1983), created by Ralph Macchio and George Pérez.

== Fictional character biography ==
Melina Vostokova is an agent recruited by the Government of the Russian Federation. Feeling she was living in the shadow of Natalia Romanova / Black Widow, Iron Maiden develops a deep hatred for her. Eventually, she stopped working for the Russian government to become a freelance agent and assassin.

Iron Maiden is among the six assassins Damon Dran hired to kill Black Widow. She battles Black Widow, but the battle is interrupted by Jimmy Woo and a group of S.H.I.E.L.D. agents. Eventually, Iron Maiden manages to escape.

Iron Maiden joins the Femizons, a team of superhuman female criminals led by Superia, whose purpose is to gain power and sterilize Earth's population to create a new world where women would rule. Iron Maiden serves as one of Superia's lieutenants.

Iron Maiden is eventually apprehended and coerced into joining the Thunderbolts during the Civil War series.

Iron Maiden later joins the group of Soviet Revolutionaries known as Remont Six to lead an attack against an A.I.M. installation outside of the Forbidden Zone in Russia. This team overpowers both Red Guardian and Crimson Dynamo, but is overpowered in turn by Ursa Major.

== Powers and abilities ==
Iron Maiden is a master martial artist, assassin, and spy, with knowledge in horticulture. She is also a weapon expert. She wears a lightweight but strong metal suit which protects her from impacts, bullets and energy weapons. It appears to function as a form of silver exoskeleton, enhancing her strength to a superhuman level and durability to an unknown degree.

== Reception ==
=== Critical reception ===
Screen Rant included Iron Maiden in their "10 Comic Book Thunderbolts That Should Join The MCU Team" list, and ranked her 2nd in their "Black Widow's 10 Biggest Enemies" list, and 5th in their "Red Room's Most Powerful Members" list.

== Other versions ==
=== Earth X ===
In the Earth X trilogy, Iron Maiden is a scientist who works on a project initiated by Reed Richards, which is meant to power the world using vibranium as a limitless source of energy. After being exposed to vibranium, Iron Maiden gains control over the substance, which allows her to form vibranium armor.

=== Mangaverse ===
An original incarnation of Iron Maiden, Toni Stark, appears in the Marvel Mangaverse series. Toni is the twin sister of Tony Stark and a former agent of S.H.I.E.L.D. who began running Stark Industries after her sibling mysteriously disappeared. Toni later dies while battling the Hulk.

=== Exiles ===
An unidentified alternate universe version of Iron Maiden appears in New Exiles as a member of Bloodforce.

=== Ultimate Marvel ===
In the Ultimate Marvel universe, Iron Maiden is an alternative codename for Natalia Romanova / Black Widow.

== In other media ==
Melina Vostokoff appears in media set in the Marvel Cinematic Universe (MCU), portrayed by Rachel Weisz.

- First appearing in Black Widow (2021), this version is a seasoned spy, Black Widow, and lead scientist for the Red Room who developed a means of controlling their Widows and serves as a mother figure to Natasha Romanoff and Yelena Belova, and a significant other to Alexei Shostakov. After reuniting with the trio, Vostokoff joins them in dismantling the Red Room.
- Alternate timeline variants of Vostokoff appear in What If...?, voiced by Rachel Weisz in the episode "What If... Captain Carter Fought the Hydra Stomper?" and Kari Wahlgren in the episode "What If... the Hulk Fought the Mech Avengers?". Wahlgren also voices an alternate version of Vostokoff in the animated series Marvel Zombies (2025).
