= Death Adder (character) =

Marvel Comics supervillain

Death Adder is the name of two supervillains appearing in American comic books published by Marvel Comics. The original Death Adder (Roland Burroughs) first appeared in Marvel Two-in-One #64 (June 1980), created by writers Mark Gruenwald and Ralph Macchio. The second Death Adder (Theodore Scott), first appeared in Civil War Files #1 and was based on the concept of the original Death Adder.

Burroughs was a hired criminal who was given his powers by the Brand Corporation that gave him razor-sharp claws, gills and a long tail, but also left him mute. After a failed mission to steal the Serpent Crown, Death Adder joined up with Sidewinder as Sidewinder created the Serpent Society. During a mission, he was shot and killed by the vigilante known as the Scourge of the Underworld. He was later briefly revived as a member of the Legion of the Unliving and then brought back to life by the Hood to fight the Punisher.

Theodore Scott, the second Death Adder, first appeared during the Civil War storyline in 2005-2006 as one of the criminals forced to join the Thunderbolts army. He would later join the Serpent Society just like his predecessor, he also became part of Serpent Solutions when the group was reorganized during the All-New, All-Different Marvel relaunch of several Marvel comic books.

== Publication history ==
The first Death Adder first appeared in Marvel Two-in-One #64 (June 1980) and was created by Mark Gruenwald and Ralph Macchio. His identity was revealed by Rick Remender during an interview for Comic Book Resources.

== Fictional character biography ==
=== Roland Burroughs ===
Death Adder

Publication information
- Publisher: Marvel Comics
- First appearance: Marvel Two-in-One #64 (June 1980)
- Created by: Mark Gruenwald; Ralph Macchio

In-story information
- Alter ego: Roland Burroughs
- Team affiliations: Serpent Society; Serpent Squad; Savage Six
- Abilities: Bionic tail with spikes Poison-tipped talons Ability to breathe underwater

Roland Burroughs was born in Rochester, New York. A small-time thug, Death Adder is chosen by Roxxon Oil Company to participate in a covert operation to retrieve the Serpent Crown from the Atlantic Ocean. At Roxxon, Roland is surgically given gills and a bionic tail, as well as poison-tipped claws, to help him in his endeavors. An accident happens during this process which renders Death Adder mute. During the mission, he and his group, the third Serpent Squad, come into conflict with the Thing, Stingray, and Triton. They recover the Crown, but are defeated and taken into custody.

He and his former teammates, Black Mamba and Anaconda, joined with him again to retrieve the "micro scanner", a weapon that scans and disrupts various body functions. They are ambushed and defeated by Iron Man, but escape. They later receive an invitation to join Sidewinder's Serpent Society. During his first mission in the Serpent Society, Death Adder succeeds in killing MODOK. He also participates in a mission to kill Captain America, whom the retired Porcupine had ostensibly captured. This ruse is actually devised by the Captain, and it eventually leads to a battle in which Death Adder is defeated.

While returning Princess Python to her original group, the Circus of Crime, Death Adder's serpent saucer crashes in the South Bronx after it is hit by an assailant (later revealed as the Scourge of the Underworld). Leaving Princess Python where she was and attempting to take a cab back to the base, he is shot and killed by the Scourge posing as a cab driver.

Death Adder is among the seventeen criminals, all murdered by the Scourge, to be resurrected by Hood using the power of Dormammu as part of a squad assembled to eliminate the Punisher. The Hood hosts a meeting for the resurrected criminals and explains to them that they have to kill the Punisher, telling them it was the Punisher who acted as the Scourge who killed them, and that if they do not kill the Punisher after one month the spell will end. Death Adder and Basilisk hold G. W. Bridge's family hostage to make him tell them where they can find the Punisher. Death Adder is one of the few villains to survive the battle against Punisher and Bridge.

In the series Venom, Death Adder appears as part of the new Crime Master's syndicate. He later becomes a member of Crime Master's Savage Six before being killed by Venom.

=== Theodore Scott ===
Death Adder

Publication information
- Publisher: Marvel Comics
- First appearance: Civil War Files #1 (November 2006)

In-story information
- Alter ego: Theodore Scott
- Team affiliations: Assassins Guild; Serpent Society; Thunderbolts
- Abilities: Bionic tail with spikes Poison-tipped talons Ability to breathe underwater

A new Death Adder, Theodore Scott, was introduced during Civil War as a member of the Thunderbolts.

During the Secret Invasion storyline, Death Adder joins the Serpent Society. The Serpent Society held a number of civilians hostage in a compound in the American Midwest, claiming they were protecting themselves from the Skrulls. However, they are easily defeated by Nova and the Nova Corps.

In All-New, All-Different Marvel, Death Adder appears as a member of the Serpent Society under its new name of Serpent Solutions. In Secret Empire, Helmut Zemo recruits Death Adder, among others, into his Army of Evil.

Later, Death Adder joins Bella Donna's Assassins Guild. Alongside several other assassins, he confronts Deadpool, who kills him with a shuriken.

== Powers and abilities ==
Through mutagenic experimentation by the Brand Corporation, the first Death Adder's strength, stamina, durability, agility, and reflexes were artificially enhanced. He also became amphibious, enabling him to breathe underwater, survive oceanic pressure, and swim at high speeds. Death Adder wore lightweight armor supplied by the Brand Corporation, which included titanium claws and a spiked casing for his tail.

== Other versions ==
=== Earth-33900 ===
An unidentified incarnation of Death Adder from Earth-33900 appears in Avengers American Armed Forces.

=== Ultimate Marvel ===
An original female incarnation of Death Adder from Earth-1610 appears in the Ultimate Marvel imprint. This version is a member of the Serpent Squad who possesses lizard-like abilities. Additionally, the Roland Burroughs incarnation of Death Adder appears as a member of the Serpent Skulls street gang before being killed by the Scourge of the Underworld.

== In other media ==
- Death Adder makes non-speaking appearances in The Avengers: Earth's Mightiest Heroes as a member of the Serpent Society.
- A female incarnation of Death Adder appears in Marvel Disk Wars: The Avengers as a member of the Serpent Society.
