= Serpent Squad =

Fictional comic book group

- Cover art for Captain America (vol. 5) #28, art by Steve Epting

Publication information
- Publisher: Marvel Comics
- First appearance: Captain America #163 (July 1973)
- Created by: Steve Englehart

In-story information
- Base(s): Various
- Member(s): Sin; Cobra; Eel; Viper; Notable former members: Anaconda; Black Mamba; Black Racer; Copperhead; Death Adder; Fer-de-Lance; Princess Python; Puff Adder; Sidewinder; Viper

The Serpent Squad is a fictional mercenary group composed of snake-themed criminals appearing in American comic books published by Marvel Comics. Most often antagonists of Captain America, the roster has changed through various incarnations.

== Publication history ==
The original team first appeared in Captain America #163, and was created by Steve Englehart.

== Fictional group history ==
The Serpent Squad was founded by Viper after escaping prison with his brother Eel and Cobra. Their plot involved ruining Captain America's reputation using false advertisements. Captain America soon caught on to their scheme, and along with the Falcon defeated the trio and sent them back to prison.

Madame Hydra later assassinated the original Viper and took his alias. She then reunited the Serpent Squad, urging the Eel to avenge his brother's death. At this time, Princess Python joined the group. Cobra was not willing to serve Viper and challenged her to a battle, but he was easily defeated. Working with the warlord Krang in an attempt to raise the lost continent Lemuria, the Serpent Squad were ambushed by Captain America, then in his Nomad identity, who defeated the Eel and Princess Python. After Cobra eventually turned on Viper, she shot him in the back and managed to escape, while Nomad rushed Cobra to the hospital.

A third Serpent Squad appeared much later, under the employ of Roxxon executive Hugh Jones. The field leader Sidewinder, along with his teammates Anaconda, Black Mamba, and Death Adder, was ordered to retrieve the Serpent Crown and return it to Jones. After a battle with the Thing and Stingray, the Serpent Squad accomplished their task. However, Triton joined the battle, and the three heroes were able to defeat Anaconda, Death Adder, and Black Mamba and trap them under the sea. Sidewinder escaped and handed the Serpent Crown over to Hugh Jones. Anaconda freed herself and her teammates from the silt, and the trio worked as freelance mercenaries, eventually battling Iron Man. They were then invited by Sidewinder to join the criminal organization, the Serpent Society, which they accepted. Former Serpent Squad members Cobra and Princess Python also joined the Society.

While the Serpent Society was active, a new Serpent Squad suddenly appeared in Las Vegas. The members, Copperhead, Fer-de-Lance, Puff Adder, and Black Racer, committed acts of terrorism and theft in various casinos. Sidewinder noticed the group, and after they were defeated by Captain America, he freed them from prison and invited them to join his group. However, they were actually in the employ of the Viper, and she used them to commence her takeover of the Serpent Society. The mission was a failure, but Copperhead, Fer-de-Lance, Puff Adder, and Black Racer decided to stay with the Serpent Society. Copperhead soon left after a conflict with the Cobra.

A new Serpent Squad surfaced with Sin as the leader, a new Viper, the Eel, and the Cobra. They attacked the White House under the orders of the Red Skull, but Bucky Barnes, the new Captain America, attacked and defeated them all except for Sin.

== Other versions ==
=== Exiles ===
Another alternate version of the Serpent Squad appeared in Exiles #89. The Exiles team had to restore Earth-27537. The Exiles had a hard time defeating the Squad, who were working together with Diamondback, but eventually the Exiles did manage to win and moved over to another reality.

=== Ultimate Marvel ===
The Serpent Squad appears in the Ultimate Universe as a group of female mercenaries searching for the Serpent Crown. The Squad consists of Anaconda, Black Mamba, Asp, Princess Python, and a female Death Adder.
