= Princess Python =

Fictional comic book characters

- Princess Python on the cover art for Iron Man, #50. Art by Gil Kane and Frank Giacoia.

Publication information
- Publisher: Marvel Comics
- First appearance: The Amazing Spider-Man #22 (March 1965)
- Created by: Stan Lee; Steve Ditko

In-story information
- Alter ego: Zelda DuBois
- Species: Human
- Team affiliations: Circus of Crime; Femizons; Serpent Squad; Serpent Society
- Abilities: Trained athlete Extremely talented snake charmer and handler Carries a hand held, electric cattle prod Use of pet snakes as sidekicks

Princess Python is a supervillain appearing in American comic books published by Marvel Comics.

== Publication history ==
Princess Python, Zelda DuBois, is a snake charmer who controls a gigantic snake to help with her crimes. She first appeared in The Amazing Spider-Man #22 (March 1965), created by writer Stan Lee and artist Steve Ditko.

Zelda DuBois started out as a snake charmer, using a 25-foot python in her act. She later became a criminal, using a gigantic snake under her mental control to commit crimes as Princess Python, part of the Circus of Crime. DuBois and the Circus are part of a group of villains that interrupt the wedding of Avengers Yellowjacket and the Wasp. She later becomes a member of the Serpent Squad as well as its successor the Serpent Society, but leaves the group as she is not a killer. She later rejoins the Circus, but then ends up in a romantic relationship with Johnny Blaze, former Ghost Rider, until they are attacked by Arcade. DuBois has been married to both Stilt-Man and Gibbon and was later revealed to be the mother of Executioner from the Young Masters, although her son is not aware of his mother's alter ego. In 2015, Princess Python became a member of Serpent Solutions as part of the All-New, All-Different Marvel.

== Fictional character biography ==
Zelda DuBois, born in Darlington, South Carolina, developed an act as a snake charmer and circus performer using a twenty-five foot python as a young adult. After joining the Circus of Crime, Princess Python convinces the other members to get rid of the Ringmaster, appoint the Clown as the leader, rename the group to the Masters of Menace, and go out on a crime spree of their own. The Masters of Menace steal paintings from a Madison Avenue art gallery, where they encounter Spider-Man. Princess Python maneuvers Spider-Man into a fight with her pet after jamming his web shooters with an electric prod, but is defeated when Spider-Man tricks the python into a knot.

When they get out of prison, the Masters of Menace agree to rejoin the Ringmaster and his Circus of Crime. They try to hypnotize Avengers members Hawkeye, Quicksilver, and Scarlet Witch into joining them but fail. Princess Python fights hand-to-hand with the Scarlet Witch after trying to cover her eyes, but loses when the Witch uses her hex power to soak her down with water, preventing her whistling for her pet. The Circus of Crime escapes capture.

The Circus next schemes to steal a huge golden bull but they need a new strong man to replace theirs since "he strained himself trying to lift the elephant". They find the Mighty Thor who has been stripped of his godly power but is still superhumanly strong. Thor is hypnotized into stealing the massive golden bull but Princess Python is trapped under the idol in the melee that follows. Thor rescues her. The grateful and somewhat smitten Princess tells the police that Thor was duped into helping them before she uses her snake to escape and rejoin the Circus.

In their next caper, the Circus disguises themselves as caterers in order to sneak into Avengers Mansion so they can disrupt the wedding of Yellowjacket and Wasp. Zelda's giant python jumps out of the wedding cake and puts the squeeze on the Wasp. But Yellowjacket turns out to be Hank Pym (which no one knew at the time) and he disrupts the plan by turning into Giant-Man, yanking the python off Wasp and tying it around the Ringmaster instead. Princess Python tries to sneak away, only to be decked by a punch from the Wasp.

At this point, the Princess strikes out on her own. She goes to Stark Industries and manages an opportunity to get her python around Tony Stark. She tells the world that she wants "one million dollars and a jet plane to South America" or Stark dies. Stark, secretly Iron Man, frees himself by using his chest-plate to shock the snake. This isn't good enough. According to Zelda, her "precious" has been specially bred to be able to crush Iron Man's armor. The python nearly does so until Iron Man kills it by tossing it in a vat of acid. Zelda is so distraught over the death of her pet that she jumps in after it, only to be saved by Iron Man before she hits the acid. Iron Man, clearly not a pet lover, suggests the Princess be "taken care of by good doctors" because of her excessive hatred of him over the death of her snake.

Death Adder recruits Zelda to join the Serpent Society and she attends an organizational meeting. However, Princess Python decides to break away from the group when they are dispatched to kill MODOK. She is captured and brought back, where she is questioned and tortured by Sidewinder. She is sent to be ransomed back to the Circus of Crime, but Death Adder, who is delivering her, is killed by the Scourge of the Underworld.

Following the Civil War storyline, Zelda reveals that she had been married to Stilt-Man during the latter's funeral held by supervillains and former supervillains. During the funeral, the bar that the wake is being held in is blown up by the Punisher. Princess Python is blinded in the explosion and marries Gibbon to be included in his insurance. At the beginning of the Marvel Apes storyline, Gibbon admits that even if Zelda truly loved him in the past, currently she's fed up with the losing streak of her new husband, and so they part.

In Dark Reign: Young Avengers, Executioner of the Young Masters is revealed to be Daniel, the son of Princess Python. Daniel seems unaware of Princess Python's costumed adventures, as their dialogue implies Daniel knows Zelda DuBois as a simple, but shady and rich, businesswoman. After learning of Zelda's criminal activities, Daniel places a bomb in Zelda's car, apparently killing her. Princess Python is revealed to have survived and joins Max Fury's Masters of Evil.

== Powers and abilities ==
Princess Python has no super human powers but she is a trained athlete and an extremely talented snake charmer and handler. She usually carries a handheld electric cattle prod capable of discharging 1,000 volts.

Princess Python has a 25-foot (7.6 m) trained pet rock python. She has had more than one such snake in her criminal career.

== Other versions ==
=== Ruins ===
An alternate universe version of Princess Python appears in Ruins. This version is a performer for the Quintano Carnival.

=== Ultimate Marvel ===
An alternate universe version of Princess Python appears in the Ultimate Marvel universe as a member of the Serpent Squad.

== In other media ==
Princess Python appears in the Avengers Assemble episode "Crime and Circuses", voiced by Hynden Walch. This version is a former member of the Circus of Crime.
