= Sidewinder (character) =

Marvel Comics character

Sidewinder is the name of three different fictional characters appearing in American comic books published by Marvel Comics. The original version was Seth Voelker. A second version appeared in 1998 but was killed during his attempt to infiltrate S.H.I.E.L.D. A third version, Gregory Bryan, was given powers similar to the original Sidewinder by the Brand Corporation.

Seth Voelker started out as an Economics professor before Roxxon Oil Company chemically mutated him and gave him the power to teleport, starting his criminal career as Sidewinder. He initially worked as hired henchman alongside Anaconda, Death Adder and Black Mamba. He later organized the Serpent Society, a group of snake-themed criminals for hire, with the Serpent Society working like a trade union. At one point, Sidewinder was deposed as leader by Viper as several members of the Serpent Society had infiltrated the group to help Viper from within. While Viper was defeated, Sidewinder chose to leave the Serpent Society with King Cobra taking control of the Serpent Society. He later retires from being a criminal.

Gregory Bryan was given his powers by the Brand Corporation and became a member of the Serpent Society later on. He later became a member of Serpent Solutions when the Serpent Society was reorganized.

== Publication history ==
The original Sidewinder, Seth Voelker, first appeared in Marvel Two-in-One #64 (Jun 1980), and was created by writers Mark Gruenwald and Ralph Macchio and artist George Pérez.

== Fictional character biography ==
=== Seth Voelker ===
Sidewinder
- Sidewinder, as he appeared in Captain America #310 (October 1985). Art by Paul Neary.

Publication information
- Publisher: Marvel Comics
- First appearance: Marvel Two-in-One #64 (June 1980)
- Created by: Mark Gruenwald; Ralph Macchio; George Pérez

In-story information
- Alter ego: Seth Voelker
- Species: Human mutate
- Team affiliations: Assassins Guild; Serpent Society; Serpent Squad
- Abilities: Teleportation

Seth Voelker was born in Kenosha, Wisconsin and grew up to become an economics professor. He failed to make tenure and was hired by the Roxxon Oil Company as an economic analyst. He discovered their criminal schemes and they permitted him to apply for mutagenic alteration. As the professional criminal Sidewinder, he is hired by Roxxon to retrieve the Serpent Crown. Alongside the third incarnation of the Serpent Squad, Sidewinder retrieves the crown and delivers it to company president Hugh Jones. After his stint working for Roxxon, Sidewinder decides to form his own criminal organization, the Serpent Society. In the Society's first mission, Sidewinder dispatches them to kill MODOK on behalf of A.I.M.

Sidewinder is betrayed by his organization after Viper infiltrates the group. After being poisoned, he is aided by Diamondback and the two survive.

Sidewinder retires from villainy to allow Captain America to help him get money for his daughter who was ill with cancer.

Sidewinder comes out of retirement after being hired by the Assassins Guild to target Elektra and her allies.

=== Infiltrator ===
Sidewinder

Publication information
- Publisher: Marvel Comics
- First appearance: Iron Fist #1 (July 1998)
- Created by: Dan Jurgens; Jackson Guice

In-story information
- Alter ego: Unknown
- Species: Human mutate
- Abilities: Teleportation

A second Sidewinder is hired by Death-Sting and Sharyd to infiltrate a S.H.I.E.L.D. station and retrieve the Zodiac Key as an early test mission. Sidewinder makes it past the neural shock unit and defeats the S.H.I.E.L.D. guards, but is killed after teleporting past an electric shield and being electrocuted.

=== Gregory Bryan ===
Sidewinder

Publication information
- Publisher: Marvel Comics
- First appearance: Captain America #31 (September 2004)
- Created by: Robert Kirkman; Scot Eaton

In-story information
- Alter ego: Gregory Bryan
- Species: Human mutate
- Team affiliations: Serpent Solutions; Army of Evil

Gregory Bryan was made into the third Sidewinder under the orders of Hugh Jones and joined the Serpent Society. After Bryan leaves the group, Cobra uses the Brand Corporation's equipment (which had been stolen by the Serpent Society) to create a series of Sidewinder successors.

Sidewinder and the Serpent Society capture Captain America and Diamondback (who was really a Life Model Decoy) and hold them in their underground New York headquarters. Sidewinder is knocked out by Diamondback. S.H.I.E.L.D. subsequently takes Sidewinder and the rest of the Society into custody.

During the Secret Invasion storyline, Sidewinder and the Society held a number of civilians hostage in a compound in the American Midwest, claiming they are protecting themselves from the Skrulls. However, they were easily defeated by Nova and his new Nova Corps.

In the All-New, All-Different Marvel publishing line, Sidewinder appears as a member of Viper's Serpent Society after it is rebranded as Serpent Solutions.

During the Secret Empire storyline, Sidewinder and the members of Serpent Solutions join Helmut Zemo's Army of Evil.

== Powers and abilities ==
Sidewinder possesses a cloak, created by scientists at the Roxxon subsidiary Brand Corporation's mutagenics laboratory and based on Nth Projector technology, which contains electronic circuitry that enables the wearer to open an aperture into another dimension. Sidewinder activates the cloak mentally through a device implanted in his body, enabling him to travel "sideways" through interdimensional space, taking with him whatever he covers with his cloak. This allows him teleport up to 50 miles (80 km) away in a single "jump". A cybernetic control chip implanted in Sidewinder's brain allows him to control it with pinpoint accuracy, and activate pre-programmed coordinates if he is knocked out or badly wounded. He has taken the precaution of implanting locator chips in his allies, allowing him to teleport to their location. Sidewinder can teleport anything that his cape can cover, up to the approximate size and shape of another human being. Sidewinder's armor provides protection against small-arms fire and a rebreather unit allowing him to survive underwater for extended periods. He also has the ability to emit energy tendrils from his forehead, which he calls his "Side Effects". It is not clear if this is a natural ability or a function of his armor. Seth Voelker possesses no actual superhuman powers. He is a skilled financial expert, business planner and strategist with an advanced degree in economics.

== Other versions ==
An alternate universe version of Sidewinder from Earth-1610 appears in All-New Ultimates. This version is a member of the Serpent Skulls gang and lieutenant to Diamondback.

== In other media ==
Seth Voelker / Sidewinder appears in Captain America: Brave New World, portrayed by Giancarlo Esposito. This version is the leader of the Serpent Society.
