= Diamondback (Rachel Leighton) =

Comic book character from Marvel Comics

Publication information
- Publisher: Marvel Comics
- First appearance: Captain America #310 (October 1985)
- Created by: Mark Gruenwald; Paul Neary

In-story information
- Alter ego: Rachel Leighton
- Species: Human
- Team affiliations: Avengers Resistance; The Initiative; BAD Girls, Inc. Serpent Society; Femizons; S.H.I.E.L.D.
- Partnerships: Black Mamba; Asp
- Notable aliases: Diamond Girl; Snapdragon
- Abilities: Skilled in throwing sharp diamond tips; Skilled gymnast

Diamondback (Rachel Leighton) is a character appearing in American comic books published by Marvel Comics. Originally depicted as a supervillain who was part of the Serpent Society, she was first introduced in Captain America #310 (October 1985) and became a series regular for years afterwards.

Rachel Leighton made her debut as part of the Serpent Society and soon came into conflict with Captain America as the group carried out an assassination. Later on, Leighton started to develop feelings for Captain America, drawing her away from the Society to the side of the good guys. After Captain America helped foil a takeover by Viper, the two began to date. Because of her involvement with a superhero the Serpent Society voted to execute her, but her life was spared by her friends within the Serpent Society. Leighton, along with Black Mamba and Asp, formed BAD Girls, Inc. a trio of adventurers who would on occasion aid Captain America. During the "Civil War" storyline BAD Girls, Inc. sided with Captain America's Anti-Registration group. She later became an agent of S.H.I.E.L.D., before briefly returning to her criminal roots as part of Serpent Solutions.

== Publication history ==
Rachel Leighton first appeared in Captain America #310 (October 1985), and was created by writer Mark Gruenwald and artist Paul Neary.

== Fictional character biography ==
Rachel Leighton was born in Austin, Texas. She was once a part-time sales clerk at a boutique, but later became a mercenary. In Captain America #319, she reveals to Captain America that she has a brother and that when she was younger, she introduced by him to Trapster. In exchange for weaponry that Trapster provides her with, Leighton suggests that in return she prostitutes herself to the criminal. One of the members of the original Serpent Society, Diamondback is a seductively sly woman with expertise in hand-to-hand combat, being trained by Anaconda at Taskmaster's academy. She primarily wields acid-laced or poison-tipped diamonds. After her first confrontation with Captain America while on assignment to find MODOK, Diamondback is instantly smitten with him.

Viper stages a coup of the Serpent Society, causing several of her underlings to infiltrate as new members and setting Viper up to take over by force. Diamondback and the Society's leader Sidewinder escape, recruiting Captain America's allies to rescue the members who are still loyal to Sidewinder.

Diamondback is later revealed to have resigned from the Serpent Society and begins dating Captain America. Diamondback is put on trial by the Serpent Society for her consorting with the enemy, with most of the Society falsely believing that she had sold out secretive information to Captain America. The Society finds Diamondback guilty for her actions and nearly executes her. Diamondback escapes with Captain America and Paladin's help, and later hires Paladin to help get revenge on the Serpent Society. Along with her best friends Black Mamba and Asp, she forms "BAD Girls, Inc."

Rachel's brothers Danny and Ricky fall in with a gang led by a man known as "Bing." Yearning to be included, Rachel approaches Bing alone. Upon claiming she would do anything to join the gang, Rachel is beaten by Bing, who kidnaps and abuses her until she agrees to steal packages of Captain America's blood from Avengers Mansion. Bing kills Danny, who sought to replace him as aid to the Red Skull, and Rachel's other brother Willy, who sought revenge for the brutality inflicted on his sister.

During the "Civil War" storyline, Diamondback joins the Secret Avengers along with Asp and Black Mamba. She takes part in the final battle of the "war", but refuses the offer of amnesty that comes with Captain America's surrender.

Diamondback appears in Camp Hammond, as an official recruit for the Initiative. When Norman Osborn assumes control of the Initiative during the "Dark Reign" storyline, Diamondback agrees to work for him. Diamondback is revealed as a member of the Initiative's Delaware-based team, the Women Warriors. After Constrictor saves her life from a crashing plane, the two begin a relationship.

Later, Rachel is shown working as an agent of S.H.I.E.L.D. and sporting a new costume.

Captain America (Sam Wilson) learns of Viper's plans with the Serpent Society, who are now operating under the new name of Serpent Solutions. He visits Diamondback for information on the group. After Diamondback is attacked and stabbed by Black Racer, Captain America attempts to come to her aid. Diamondback betrays Captain America, revealing herself to be a member of the Serpent Society once again, and Captain America is captured. In the ensuing battle, Diamondback turns against Viper and helps the heroes defeat the Society.

== Related Diamondbacks ==
=== Debbie Bertrand ===
A second Diamondback is introduced in the "Secret War" storyline. This Diamondback is Deborah "Debbie" Bertrand, an Olympic athlete and gymnast who attended the University of North Carolina. For undisclosed reasons, Bertrand purchased equipment from the Tinkerer, which he had designed for Rachel Leighton. Perhaps hoping to use Leighton's reputation to boost her own, Bertrand begins operating as Diamondback, despite Leighton still being active under that identity.

=== Rachel Leighton LMD ===
A third Diamondback, apparently Rachel Leighton, resurfaced as a S.H.I.E.L.D. operative, trying to rekindle her romance with Captain America while working undercover for the Red Skull. Truly loving Steve Rogers, but still willing to follow the plot, she is confronted and killed by the Red Skull, only to "resurrect" herself with a biomechanical form able to control technology. Nick Fury explains that Leighton is an advanced Life Model Decoy and decides to keep her in storage while working to restore her proper programming. Before Leighton can be restored, Iron Maniac wipes her memories and reconfigures her into an armor for his use.

=== Hobgoblin's Diamondback ===
While regaining his franchises, Roderick Kingsley sells one of Diamondback's old costumes to an unnamed female criminal, who is trained to replace her.

== Powers and abilities ==
Rachel Leighton is an athletic woman with no superhuman powers. She has skill in gymnastics, and at pitching small ballistic objects with great accuracy, and at piloting small aircraft. She also has knowledge of general street-fighting techniques, and some jujitsu. Leighton wears a costume of synthetic stretch fabric backed by Kevlar weave, with two biceps-belts and two thigh-belts for carrying throwing diamonds, concealed pockets in the boot tops, boot-heels, glove tops, and brassiere for other throwing diamonds, and throwing diamond earrings. Her personal weaponry consists of throwing diamonds, which are actually 4-inch (100 mm) hollow zirconium octahedrons (though not made of diamond, they are shaped like diamonds) containing various substances; spent uranium, plastic explosives, nitric acid, tear gas, smoke, curare-derived narcotics, etc. Her equipment was originally designed and manufactured by the Trapster, but her later design and manufacture was by the Tinkerer.

== Reception ==
=== Accolades ===
- In 2020, Scary Mommy included Rachel Leighton in their "195+ Marvel Female Characters Are Truly Heroic" list.
- In 2022, Screen Rant included Rachel Leighton in their "10 Best Anti-Heroes Not Yet In The MCU" list.

== Other versions ==
An alternate universe version of Rachel Leighton / Diamondback from Earth-1610 appears in All-New Ultimates #1. This version is a teenage delinquent and a member of the Serpent Skulls gang.

== In other media ==
=== Television ===
- Diamondback appears in Marvel Disk Wars: The Avengers, voiced by Naomi Shindō in the Japanese dub and Rachel Robinson in the English dub. This version is the partner of Rosetta Riley and a member of the Serpent Society.
- Diamondback appears in the Marvel Future Avengers episode "Mission Black Market Auction", voiced by Naomi Shindō in the Japanese dub and Courtenay Taylor in the English dub. This version is a member of B.A.D. Girls, Inc.

=== Film ===
Diamondback was meant to appear in Captain America: Brave New World, portrayed by Rosa Salazar, before her scenes were cut.

=== Video games ===
- Diamondback appears as a boss in Marvel Ultimate Alliance 2, voiced by Jameelah McMillan.
- Diamondback appears as an unlockable playable character in Lego Marvel's Avengers.
