= Stingray (Marvel Comics) =

Fictional comics superhero

- Walter Newell / Stingray. Art by Lee Weeks.

Publication information
- Publisher: Marvel Comics
- First appearance: As Walter Newell: Tales to Astonish #95 (September 1967); As Stingray: Sub-Mariner #19 (November 1969)
- Created by: Roy Thomas (writer); Bill Everett (artist)

In-story information
- Alter ego: Dr. Walter Newell
- Species: Human
- Team affiliations: Astonishing Avengers; Mercs for Money; Secret Avengers; Heroes for Hire; The Initiative; Defenders; Point Men; Avengers
- Partnerships: Namor
- Notable aliases: Stingray
- Abilities: Exoskeleton battlesuit granting: Superhuman strength and durability; Electrical bolt projection via gloves; Gliding via streamlined wings; Enhanced swimming speed; Protection against radiation; Skilled inventor of oceanographic equipment; Experienced oceanographer; Gifted intellect

Stingray (Walter Newell) is a superhero appearing in American comic books published by Marvel Comics. Created by Roy Thomas and Bill Everett, the character first appeared in Tales to Astonish #95 (September 1967). Stingray is an engineer and oceanographer.

== Publication history ==
Walter Newell debuted in Tales to Astonish #95 (September 1967), created by Roy Thomas and Bill Everett. He appeared under the codename Stingray in Prince Namor, the Sub-Mariner #19 (November 1969). He appeared in the 2014 Avengers World series. He appeared in the 2016 Deadpool & the Mercs for Money series. He appeared in the 2018 Avengers series.

== Fictional character biography ==
Walter Newell first appears in the title Tales to Astonish as an oceanographer working for the United States government. The character encounters the human/Atlantean hybrid hero Namor the Sub-Mariner and his lover Lady Dorma, while supervising the construction of a domed sub-sea city whose purpose is to harvest food for mankind. The city, however, is destroyed by the villain the Plunderer. Newell becomes a perennial character in the title Prince Namor, the Sub-Mariner and aids the hero and Dorma against the villain Tiger Shark and is coerced by the government into investigating the disappearance of water from the Earth's oceans. This is attributed to aliens who are believed to be in league with Namor. Ordered to capture Namor, Newell develops a suit based on the form of the sea creature the manta ray, and as 'Stingray' captures Namor, who was weakened at the time. Newell, however, believes Namor to be innocent and allows him to escape.

Stingray aids Namor and the Inhuman Triton against a group of Atlanteans who destroy an ocean liner and falsely claim to have done so for Namor. The culprit is revealed to be Atlantean warlord Attuma, who is eventually defeated. Stingray assists Namor in a search for his father Leonard Mackenzie, with Mackenzie being accidentally killed in a battle with villains Llyra and Tiger Shark.

After brief appearances in titles the Hulk and The Defenders, Newell becomes a regular guest-star in the title Marvel Two-In-One. The character moves his oceanographic facilities and research to Hydro-Base, an artificial island previously used by the insane ecologist Doctor Hydro (occupied by Dr. Henry Croft and the passengers of an airplane, who were captured by Hydro and changed into merfolk known as the Hydro-Men). As Stingray, Newell aids Fantastic Four member the Thing, Triton, and heroine the Scarlet Witch against the villains the Serpent Squad and company Roxxon Oil to prevent them from obtaining the artifact the Serpent Crown. Stingray is present when Mister Fantastic cures Croft and the other passengers, and aids the Thing and Inhumans Gorgon and Karnak against Maelstrom's Minions, who steal a dose of the healing compound.

Newell marries Diane Arliss, the sister of Todd Arliss (Tiger Shark) and leased part of Hydro-Base to superhero team the Avengers, and becomes an associate member of the team. During the first "Armor Wars" storyline, Avenger Iron Man confronts Stingray, mistakenly believing that Newell's suit was based on technology stolen from Stark Enterprises, forcing Stark to publicly fire Iron Man to protect his company from being affected by his current actions after he confirmed that Stingray's suit had been independently created. Stingray aids the Avengers when Hydro-Base is invaded by Heavy Metal, a team of robot villains.

During the "Acts of Vengeance" storyline, the Hydro-Base is damaged by an attack from Doctor Doom's Doombots and sinks, with Stingray aiding the Avenger Quasar in a salvage operation. In the title Marvel Comics Presents, Stingray encounters his brother-in-law Tiger Shark. After a battle, they work together to save Diane Arliss, who is trapped after a cave-in. Diane confirms to him sometime later that she is pregnant, although the details have never been mentioned or seen since.

During the "Civil War" storyline, Stingray is a member of the Secret Avengers – led by Captain America – who oppose the Superhuman Registration Act. After Captain America's arrest and subsequent death, Stingray accepts Tony Stark's (Iron Man's alter ego) offer of a full pardon, and joins The Initiative.

During the "AXIS" storyline, Stingray is among the heroes recruited by an inverted Doctor Doom to join his team of Avengers. This group tries to focus on the innocent people put in danger where Scarlet Witch, now uncaring of morality, attacks Latveria. Stingray does his part by rescuing several people from a debris-filled river. His actions earn him the respect of U.S. Agent.

As part of the "All-New, All-Different Marvel", Stingray is seen as part of Deadpool's Mercs for Money. It is later revealed that he is a double agent who Captain America assigned to monitor the team.

Stingray is later sent by the Avengers to issue a reprieve to an imprisoned Namor to settle a raging civil war in Atlantis. After Namor quells the civil war and assumes the title of Last King of Atlantis, Stingray is appointed an ambassador from the surface world and is invited to the newly transformed Atlantis.

== Powers and abilities ==
Walter Newell designed and wears the Stingray battlesuit, an armored exoskeleton composed of a superhard artificial cartilage designed mainly for underwater use. It enhances his strength and durability to superhuman levels, which allow him to operate within the crushing pressures of the ocean depths. His suit is equipped with an oxygen-diffusing system providing breathable air almost indefinitely, allowing him to breathe underwater. The suit also gives him enhanced swimming speed, and its streamlined wings allow him to glide through air for great distances. The Stingray battlesuit's chief offensive weapon is a powerful electrical discharge device built into the exoskeleton, able to project bolts of up to 20,000 volts through air or water and released through the gloves. The suit grants protection against radiation.

Additionally, Walter Newell has a gifted intellect and has a Ph.D. in oceanography. He is an experienced oceanographer and a skilled inventor of experimental oceanographic equipment.

== Reception ==
=== Critical response ===
Michael Doran of Newsarama included Stingray in their "Best Marvel Characters Left To Adapt To The MCU" list, writing, "Stingray has got a cool suit and name." Rob Bricken of Gizmodo ranked Stingray 66th in their "Every Member Of The Avengers" list.

Comic Book Resources ranked Stingray 8th in their "25 Obscure Marvel Characters Who Deserve Their Own Movie" list. Screen Rant included Stingray in their "10 Best Tech-Based Characters Who Should Join The MCU Next" list, and ranked him 9th in their "Marvel's 10 Most Powerful Aquatic Characters" list, and 13th in their "13 Best Avengers Members Who Joined in the '90s" list.

== Other versions ==
=== Age of Apocalypse ===
An alternate universe version of Stingray from Earth-295 appears in Age of Apocalypse. He is the captain of the submarine Excalibur which transports refugees to Avalon.

=== Marvel Zombies ===
A zombified alternate universe version of Stingray from Earth-2149 appears in Marvel Zombies.

=== Mutant X ===
An alternate universe version of Stingray from Earth-1298 appears in Mutant X. This version is a member of the Defenders.

=== Secret Wars ===
An alternate universe version of Stingray from Earth-12311 appears in Secret Wars. This version is a spy who wields advanced armor developed by Arno Stark.

== In other media ==
- Walter Newell / Stingray appears in the Iron Man episode "The Armor Wars", voiced by Tom Kane. This version is a naval command officer who can manipulate water and air.
- Walter Newell / Stingray appears in Lego Marvel Super Heroes 2.
