= Cobra (Marvel Comics) =

Multiple characters in Marvel comics

Cobra is the name of several characters appearing in American comic books published by Marvel Comics.

The most well-known Cobra is Klaus Voorhees, now known as the King Cobra. He first appeared in Journey into Mystery #98 (Nov. 1963) created by writer Stan Lee and artist Don Heck. Klaus Voorhees was a laboratory assistant, working with a professor trying to find a cure for various venomous snake bites. A combination of a bite from a radioactive cobra and the experimental anti-venom granted him superpowers, which led to him becoming the supervillain briefly known as the Human Cobra and then as the Cobra. The Cobra and Mister Hyde formed a criminal team for years, fighting various heroes such as Thor and Daredevil. He later became a member of the Serpent Squad and a member of Sidewinder's Serpent Society. During a takeover attempt by the Viper, the Cobra actually opposed her rule and sided with Captain America to depose the Viper and foil her plans. The Cobra later took the name "the King Cobra" as he assumed leadership of the Serpent Society. When the Serpent Society became Serpent Solutions under the leadership of the Viper (Jordan Stryke, a different Viper) the King Cobra became a member of the group.

His nephew, Piet Voorhees, became the second Cobra and first appeared in White Tiger #1 (Jan. 2007) in a story written by Tamora Pierce and drawn by Timothy Liebe. Piet Voorhees was injected with the same chemicals that gave his uncle his powers and he became the second Cobra, working as a mercenary. On one mission he encountered the White Tiger, who defeated him. The Cobra later joined the Serpent Squad, organized by Sin and would also work for Hydra as a mercenary.

Marvel has also used the moniker "Cobra" for two World War II Nazi villains and also a mercenary enemy of Moon Knight.

The original Cobra has appeared outside of Marvel Comics, most notably in "The Mighty Thor" portion of The Marvel Super Heroes as well as in episodes of The Avengers: Earth's Mightiest Heroes and Marvel Disk Wars: The Avengers.

== Publication history ==
Klaus Voorhees was briefly known as the Human Cobra, then was known as the Cobra for many years and is currently known as the King Cobra. The Klaus Voorhees version of the Cobra was most commonly associated with Thor, Daredevil and, to a lesser extent, Captain America and Spider-Man. The character was created by Stan Lee and Don Heck in Journey into Mystery #98 (Nov. 1963) in which he first battled Thor. His next appearance (Journey into Mystery #105–106 (June–July 1964)) saw him team up with Mister Hyde for the first time (with Hyde being the brains of the team) and the duo had a few more encounters with Thor before their first battle with Daredevil in Daredevil #30–32 (July–Sept. 1967).

== Fictional character biography ==
=== Klaus Voorhees ===
Cobra

Publication information
- Publisher: Marvel Comics
- First appearance: Journey into Mystery #98 (November 1963)
- Created by: Stan Lee; Don Heck

In-story information
- Alter ego: Klaus Voorhees
- Team affiliations: Thunderbolts; Serpent Society; Serpent Squad
- Notable aliases: The Human Cobra, the King Cobra
- Abilities: Very flexible and slithery body Superhuman strength, agility, reflexes and reactions, coordination, balance and endurance Wall-crawling; Various venomous gadgets

Klaus Voorhees was born in Rotterdam, the Netherlands. Klaus is an ex-convict and a laboratory assistant to Professor Schecktor, a scientist working in India and looking for a cure for venomous snake bites. Unsatisfied with his lower position, and intent on stealing Schecktor's discoveries, Voorhees kills Schecktor by using a cobra. In order to make himself look less guilty, Voorhees lets the cobra bite him as well. The cobra is radioactive due to experimentation and in a process similar to that which granted Spider-Man his powers, gives Voorhees superhuman abilities similar to a cobra's. As Cobra, Voorhees attempts to manufacture a cobra-serum to transform others into similarly-powered slaves, but is thwarted by Thor.

Cobra is a longtime ally of Mister Hyde, who he first worked with in an attempt to get revenge on Thor. Cobra and Hyde are bailed out of prison by Loki, who enhances their powers and sends them to kidnap Jane Foster. Cobra is easily defeated by Thor before being arrested with Hyde.

Cobra later joins the original Serpent Squad with Eel and his brother Viper. With the Serpent Squad, he attacks Captain America and the Falcon. He subsequently joins the second Serpent Squad and battles Steve Rogers in his Nomad identity, then he became involved in an attempt to raise the continent of Lemuria up from the ocean.

Cobra joins Sidewinder's crime cartel, the Serpent Society. When Sidewinder retires, Cobra becomes the leader of the Serpent Society. He beats Mister Hyde in personal combat and then assumed a new costume and a new name called King Cobra.

King Cobra is enlisted by Lucia von Bardas, the former prime minister of Latveria, and placed in her secret army of technology-based villains. Von Bardas sends the army against Wolverine, Spider-Man, Luke Cage, Daredevil, and Captain America, who had been sent to Latveria to stop von Bardas. King Cobra escapes during the resulting battle.

After the passing of the Superhuman Registration Act in the Civil War storyline, King Cobra is forced to join the Thunderbolts and be trained by the Swordsman, along with Ox and Unicorn. Cobra later returns to the Serpent Society.

=== Piet Voorhees ===
Cobra

Publication information
- Publisher: Marvel Comics
- First appearance: White Tiger #1 (Jan. 2007)
- Created by: Tamora Pierce; Timothy Liebe

In-story information
- Alter ego: Piet Voorhees
- Team affiliations: Chaeyi; Serpent Squad; Hydra; Savage Six
- Notable aliases: The King Cobra
- Abilities: Very flexible and slithery body Superhuman strength, agility, reflexes and reactions, coordination, balance and endurance Wall-crawling; Enhanced olfactory senses Ability to produce and project "cobra venom"

Piet Voorhees is the nephew of Klaus Voorhees. Klaus injected Piet with the same mutagenic serum that first gave him his own superhuman abilities. Using these new powers for selfish means, Piet became a high-level international mercenary. He has performed operations in Southeast Asia, Bosnia, Central Asia and Chechnya.

Cobra becomes involved with an international cartel known as Chaeyi. He has been working to get stolen passports and visas to illegal aliens. This operation has brought him into conflict with the newest White Tiger.

In a new costume, Cobra appears as a member of Sin's new Serpent Squad in the employ of the Red Skull. He breaks Crossbones out of jail and later attacks the White House, but is stopped by the new Captain America. Cobra escapes with Sin in a helicopter and reports the incident to Red Skull.

Cobra later appears as a member of Hydra, led by Helmut Zemo, who are planning to spread poisonous blood extracted from an Inhuman boy named Lucas. He and Armadillo fight Sam Wilson, the new Captain America, until Armadillo is convinced to turn on Hydra and stops Cobra from killing Wilson.

In the "Hunted" storyline, Cobra is among the animal-themed characters captured by the Taskmaster and the Black Ant on Kraven the Hunter's behalf. He is grouped with Rhino, Scorpion, Stegron, Tarantula, and Vulture as the Savage Six by Arcade. After the end of Kraven's Great Hunt, the Savage Six decide to remain together.

== Powers and abilities ==
The Klaus Voorhees of Cobra possesses superhuman strength, durability, and agility. His body is highly flexible, enabling him to fit into extremely small spaces and making his bones nearly impossible to break. Cobra wears a bodysuit made of reinforced synthetic stretch material; the torso section, helmet, and tail are made of a bendable material and the entire costume is coated with silicon and graphite dust compound to make it slippery. Cobra is also armed with special cobra-themed tools: he is equipped with a "cobra cord" (an unbreakable cable), wrist-mounted venom-filled projectiles, and toxic gas. He uses cartridge projectiles filled with various substances: acid, smoke, nerve gas, plastic explosives, etc. Cobra wears micro-suction cups on his fingertips and toes, permitting him to cling to walls and ceilings.

Piet Voorhees possesses similar abilities to Klaus Voorhees, namely his flexibility. He also possesses enhanced olfactory senses, which enables him to track his targets by way of their scent. Cobra can produce a toxic substance from his body akin to cobra venom.

== Other characters named the Cobra ==
=== Albri Leiricgrie ===
Albri Leiricgrie is a costumed villain who worked for the Nazis during World War II and was an enemy of the Human Torch and Toro.

=== Cobra (Nazi spy) ===
There was also a Cobra who worked as a spy for the Nazis during World War II and was an enemy of Namor the Sub-Mariner.

=== James Lardner ===
James Lardner is a member of the CIA who sought vengeance for the death of his brother Amos. Blaming Marc Spector, he launches a grenade at Spector's mansion, which he survives. While in Paris, James pursues Charles le Blanc, head of Operation Cobra, which Amos had participated in. James is captured by Operation Cobra, subjected to their experiments, and dubbed Cobra. The next night when the Moon Knight goes to investigate Charles le Blanc, Cobra is sent to kill him. Cobra attacks le Blanc, but le Blanc's car explodes, killing them both.

== Other versions ==
=== Age of Apocalypse ===
An alternate universe version of Klaus Voorhees / Cobra appears in Age of Apocalypse. This version is feral, cannibalistic, and known to prowl graveyards and attack anyone who enters his territory.

=== House of M ===
An alternate universe version of Klaus Voorhees / Cobra appears in House of M as a member of the Hood's Masters of Evil.

=== Earth-33900 ===
An alternate universe version of Klaus Voorhees / Cobra appears in the series The Avengers American Armed Forces. This version is a founding member of the Serpent Society.

=== Ultimate Marvel ===
An alternate universe version of Klaus Voorhees / Cobra appears in the Ultimate Marvel imprint. This version is a member of the Serpent Skulls.

== In other media ==
=== Television ===
- The Klaus Voorhees incarnation of Cobra appears in "The Mighty Thor" segment of The Marvel Super Heroes, voiced by Rod Coneybeare.
- Klaus Voorhees / King Cobra appears in The Avengers: Earth's Mightiest Heroes, voiced by James C. Mathis III. This version is the leader of the Serpent Society.
- Klaus Voorhees / King Cobra appears in Marvel Disk Wars: The Avengers.

=== Video games ===
- Klaus Voorhees / King Cobra appears in the Captain America: The Winter Soldier film tie-in game.
- Klaus Voorhees / King Cobra appears in Marvel: Avengers Alliance 2.
