= Ralph Macchio (editor) =

American comic book editor and writer

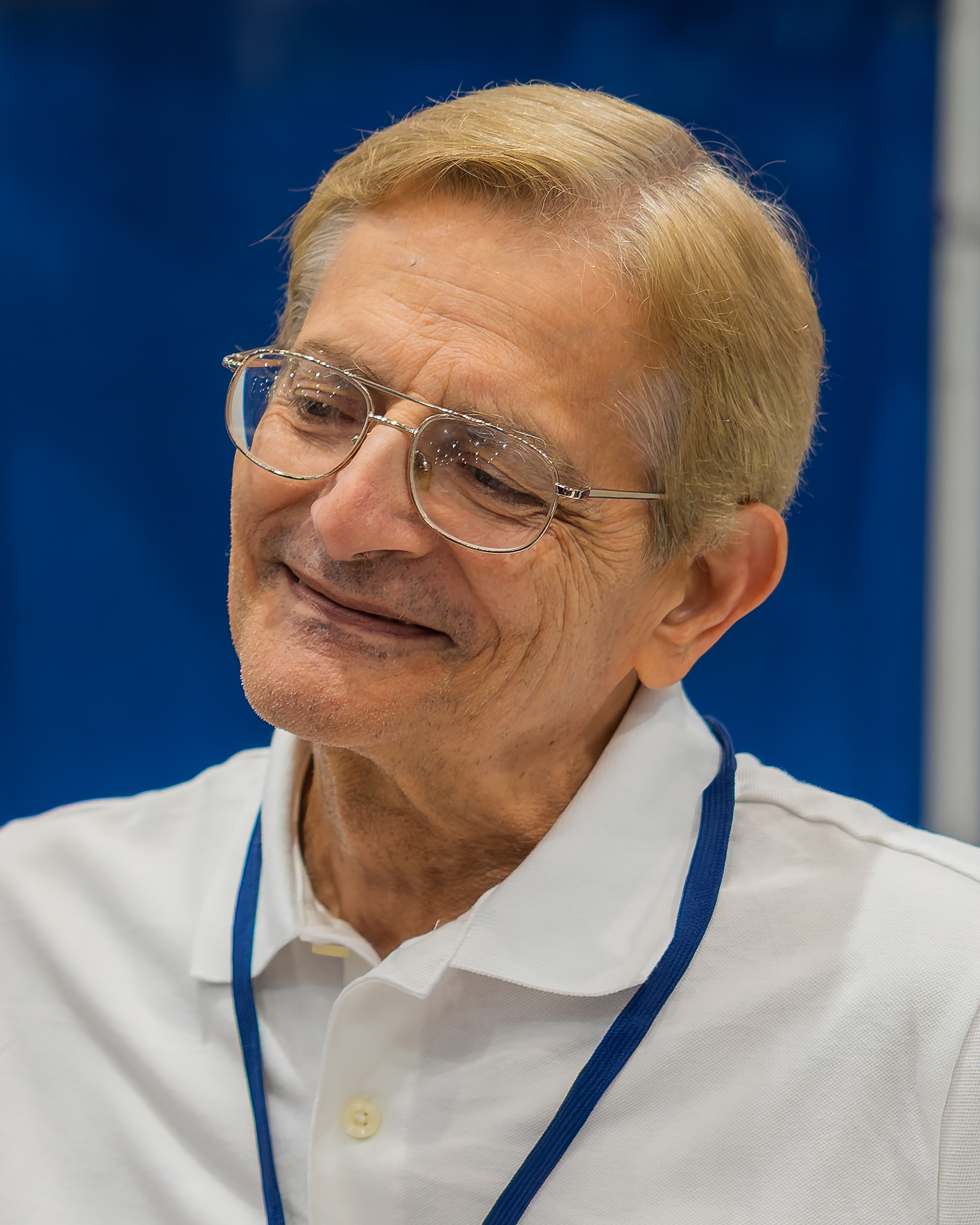
- Macchio in 2026
- Born: December 28, 1951 (age 74)
- Areas: Writer, Editor
- Notable works: Daredevil; Thor; Captain America; Spider-Man; Ultimate Marvel

Ralph Macchio (/ˈmɑːkioʊ/ MAH-kee-oh; born December 28, 1950) is an American comic book editor and writer who has held many positions at Marvel Comics, including executive editor. Macchio is commonly associated with Daredevil, Thor, the Spider-Man line of comics, and the Ultimate Marvel line.

Macchio shares a name with the actor Ralph Macchio, and is nicknamed "Karate Kid" after his famous role. He shares a birthday with comics legend Stan Lee.

== Early life ==
As a young man, Macchio was a comics fan and "letterhack," and had many letters printed in Marvel comic books. His background, however, was in English literature, and he considered teaching as a career. In no hurry to get such a job, Macchio happened to meet Killraven writer Don McGregor at a comic book convention.

Knowing Macchio from his many letters, McGregor asked Macchio if he wanted a tour of the Marvel offices. During the tour, Macchio was asked by writer Chris Claremont to interview editor-in-chief Roy Thomas for FOOM (Marvel's self-produced fanzine). During the course of doing the interview, Macchio met many more Marvel employees, and eventually was asked by writer/editor John Warner to join the staff and assist Warner with Marvel's black-and-white magazine line. Macchio, having "nothing else to do after graduate school," agreed.

== Career ==
=== Writing ===
Macchio's most consistent early credits were as writer of Marvel Two-in-One, which he co-scripted with Mark Gruenwald from 1978 to 1981, and Thor, which he wrote (also with Gruenwald) from 1980 to 1981. Macchio shifted to mostly editing in 1982, though he wrote the scripts for the 1985–1986 The Sword of Solomon Kane miniseries, based on Robert E. Howard's Puritan swordsman, and wrote The Avengers from 1987 to 1988 and part of 1989. He has also written for Marvel Fanfare, X-Men Adventures, and the premiere issue of Transformers, among others.

=== Editing ===
After working as an assistant editor for Warner on Marvel's black-and-white magazine line, Macchio became Dennis O'Neil's assistant editor. Promoted to full editor in 1981, Macchio's first major editing work was Master of Kung Fu, which he helmed from 1982 to 1983. His first line of books included The Saga of Crystar (which he co-created with John Romita, Jr. and Mark Gruenwald), Dazzler, ROM, U.S. 1, and Micronauts. During this early period, Macchio's assistant editor was Bob Harras, later to become Marvel editor-in-chief.

From 1984 through 1995, Macchio was Daredevil editor. He spent nearly decade-long editing stints on Thor and Captain America with shorter periods on Avengers and Fantastic Four. He also edited movie adaptations, Star-Lord, and Kull the Conqueror.

In 1996, Macchio became editor of the Spider-Man line, which he helmed into the early 2000s. Starting in 2000, he edited the Marvel Ultimates line. In 2007, Macchio oversaw the adaptation of Stephen King's Dark Tower novels into a comic-book series.

Macchio retired from Marvel in 2011.

Preceded by David Anthony Kraft, Roger Slifer	Marvel Two-in-One writer (with Mark Gruenwald); 1978–1981	Succeeded by Tom DeFalco
Preceded by Roy Thomas	Thor writer (with Mark Gruenwald); 1980–1981	Succeeded by Doug Moench
Preceded by Roger Stern	Avengers writer 1987–1988	Succeeded by Walt Simonson
Preceded by Walt Simonson	Avengers writer 1989	Succeeded by John Byrne
