= Viper (Madame Hydra) =

Marvel Comics fictional character

Ophelia Sarkissian Viper
- Ophelia Sarkissian / Viper as depicted in Spider-Woman (vol. 4) #4 (December 2009). Art by Kieron Dwyer.

Publication information
- Publisher: Marvel Comics
- First appearance: Captain America #110 (February 1969)
- Created by: Jim Steranko (writer / artist)

In-story information
- Alter ego: Ophelia Sarkissian
- Species: Human mutate
- Team affiliations: Serpent Squad; Secret Empire; H.A.M.M.E.R. Hellfire Club; J.A.N.U.S. Madripoor; The Hand; Hydra
- Notable aliases: Madame Hydra; Madame Viper; Warrior White Princess
- Abilities: Immunity to most forms of toxins and venoms; Skilled martial artist, swordsman, and marksman; Excellent strategist and tactician; Equipments include poison-tipped throwing dart, knives, guns, and whips

Ophelia Sarkissian, also known as Viper and Madame Hydra, is a supervillain appearing in American comic books published by Marvel Comics. Created by writer-artist Jim Steranko, the character first appeared in Captain America #110 (1969). Viper is a leader of the terrorist organization Hydra and serves as an adversary of various heroes in the Marvel Universe, most notably Captain America and Black Widow, the Avengers, and Wolverine of the X-Men.

Since her original introduction in comics, the character has been featured in various other Marvel-licensed products, including video games, animated television series, and merchandise. The character appeared in the X-Men franchise film The Wolverine, portrayed by Svetlana Khodchenkova. A version of the character, Aida "Ophelia" / Madame Hydra, appears in the Marvel Cinematic Universe television series Agents of S.H.I.E.L.D. as the simulated identity of the Life Model Decoy, Aida, portrayed by Mallory Jansen.

== Publication history ==
Viper debuted in Captain America #110 (February 1969), created by Jim Steranko. She appeared in the 2016 Captain America: Steve Rogers series. She appeared in the 2017 Secret Empire series. She appeared in the 2018 Hunt for Wolverine: Mystery in Madripoor series.

== Fictional character biography ==
Ophelia Sarkissian was orphaned as a child in Hungary. Part of her face was scarred at one time, although it has since been healed. Among 12 other girls, Ophelia was taken in by Hydra and raised by Kraken. For 22 years, Ophelia excelled and became Kraken's best student. She eventually rose through the ranks of Hydra and frequently came into conflict with Captain America and the organization known as S.H.I.E.L.D. She first appeared as a leader of Hydra under the codename Madame Hydra, and first fought and captured Captain America while trying to contaminate New York City's water supply. Madame Hydra later severed ties with Hydra.

Madame Hydra helps Viper (Jordan Stryke) escape custody in Virginia, only to proceed in assassinating Stryke and usurping the Viper alias and leadership of the Serpent Squad. As the second Viper, she kidnapped Roxxon president Hugh Jones, in order to put the latter in thrall of the Serpent Crown. She battled Nomad and Namor the Sub-Mariner.

Viper battles Spider-Woman, believing herself to be her mother. Viper reveals herself to have been a pawn of Chthon for 50 years, but saves Spider-Woman's life by defying Chthon. Viper, employing Constrictor as her chief operative, captures Spider-Woman, believing she was responsible for making her think they were related. It was revealed that Chthon had given Viper false memories of mothering Jessica Drew as part of a plan to place both women under his control.

Madame Hydra has also been in conflict with the X-Men. She first came into contact with them upon trying to assassinate Mariko Yashida on behalf of her ally and presumed lover Silver Samurai, and tried to poison the team while disguised as Mariko's unconscious maid. She nearly killed X-Men members Rogue and Storm on two separate occasions, with Storm being nearly killed by Viper during the invasion of Khan.

Later she blackmailed Wolverine into marrying her as a means to secure her criminal empire in Madripoor. Although this was a marriage of convenience, she did request to consummate the arrangement. Some time later, her body was briefly inhabited by the spirit of Ogun, and Wolverine mortally wounded her as a means of driving the spirit from her dying body. In return for seeking medical attention to save her life, Wolverine demanded a divorce.

Viper was then a member of an incarnation of the Hellfire Club, working with Courtney Ross, briefly under the title "White Warrior Princess". She has also associated with the Hand and resumed her ties with the Silver Samurai. She has also retaken the name "Madame Hydra".

During the Dark Reign storyline, Viper is seen leaving her lover, the Silver Samurai, to rejoin Baron Strucker and the ruling council of Hydra. It was revealed that she is no longer Madame Hydra, as she was replaced by Valentina Allegra de Fontaine.

Viper is kidnapped by the mysterious group Leviathan, who are determined to find out the location of a mysterious box that both she and Madame Hydra procured from the Yashidas. Madame Hydra arrived at the Leviathan headquarters and offered the box to its leader, much to Viper's dismay. Madame Hydra then shot Viper to death. However, when Hydra arrived, Hive resurrected her, giving her tentacles that stemmed from her head, and she renamed herself Madame Hydra.

Following the Fear Itself storyline, Madame Hydra joins up with H.A.M.M.E.R. after Norman Osborn escapes from the Raft and regains leadership. After the defeat of Osborn and the Dark Avengers, Madame Hydra uses the resources of the now-defunct H.A.M.M.E.R. to begin rebuilding Hydra. She later tips off Spider-Woman and Hawkeye about a heist Mister Negative is planning on a S.H.I.E.L.D. warehouse. While the Avengers deal with Mister Negative, Madame Hydra attacks a different S.H.I.E.L.D. facility and steals several captive Skrulls.

During the "Hunt for Wolverine" storyline, Viper is seen in Madripoor, where she leads the Femme Fatales in ambushing Kitty Pryde, Domino, Jubilee, Psylocke, and Storm. Psylocke, Rogue, and Storm are defeated and taken prisoner, but Kitty escapes with Domino and Jubilee. After the Femme Fatales are defeated, Viper flees.

In the Ravencroft miniseries, Viper is seen as a member of J.A.N.U.S.

== Powers and abilities ==
Ophelia Sarkissian's strength, speed, reflexes, agility, dexterity, coordination, balance and endurance are honed to an extensive degree. She displays great skill in swordsmanship, hand-to-hand combat, and marksmanship with long-range weapons. Viper occasionally employs poisoned weapons with snake-motifs, such as venomous darts or artificial fangs filled with poison. She utilizes experimental weaponry, including a ring that enables teleportation, and in X-Treme X-Men, she made use of razor-sharp claw attachments built into her gloves. A brilliant strategist and tactician with extensive combat tactical experience, Sarkissian is highly skilled in the management of criminal organizations and very well connected in the international criminal underworld. She is also a master of stealth and espionage. Her greatest strengths are her influence, the financial resources at her disposal due to her stature in organized crime, and an uncanny luck which has allowed her to cheat death in situations where other people would have died. Sarkissian may or may not have supernaturally augmented longevity.

Sarkissian is usually armed with various ray pistols and conventional handguns. She has also used various other special weaponry, including poison-tipped throwing darts, knives, and whips. She has sharpened and elongated canine teeth with hollows inside them. She keeps a special poison in them, to which she has an immunity.

== Reception ==
=== Critical response ===
Kai Young of Screen Rant called Ophelia Sarkissian "one of the most recognizable villains in the Marvel Universe." Marc Buxton of Den of Geek included Ophelia Sarkissian in their "Greatest Wolverine Villains" list. Jesse Schedeen of IGN ranked Ophelia Sarkissian 21st in their "Top 25 Marvel Villains" list. Comic Book Resources ranked Ophelia Sarkissian 2nd in their "10 Most Powerful Crime Bosses In Marvel Comics" list, 2nd in their "Marvel: The Council Of Hydra Members" list, 7th in their "10 Most Attractive Marvel Villains" list, and 7th in their "Marvel Comics: Ranking 10 Members Of Hydra From Weakest To Most Powerful" list.

== Other versions ==
=== Age of Apocalypse ===
An alternate universe version of Ophelia Sarkissian from Earth-295 appears in Age of Apocalypse. This version was married to the Silver Samurai and was killed saving him from Apocalypse's Infinites.

=== Exiles ===
An alternate universe version of Madame Hydra from Earth-1720, Susan Storm, appears in Exiles.

=== Ultimate Marvel ===
An alternate version of Ophelia Sarkissian from Earth-1610 appears in Ultimatum: Spider-Man Requiem #1

=== Ultimate Universe ===
An alternate universe version of Viper from Earth-6160 appears in the Ultimate Universe. This version is a member of the Maker's Council and the overseer of several territories in Japan. It is later revealed that her real name is Aida.

== In other media ==
=== Television ===
- Viper appears in the X-Men: Evolution episode "Target X", voiced by Lisa Ann Beley. This version is the leader of Hydra and is responsible for creating X-23.
- Viper / Madame Hydra appears in The Avengers: Earth's Mightiest Heroes, voiced by Vanessa Marshall. This version is a high-ranking member of Hydra and the leader of the Serpent Society.
- A version of the character, Aida / "Ophelia" / Madame Hydra, appears in Agents of S.H.I.E.L.D., portrayed by Mallory Jansen. This version is a Life Model Decoy, an android body based on Holden Radcliffe's former lover and partner Agnes Kitsworth into which he transferred his artificial intelligence AIDA.

=== Film ===
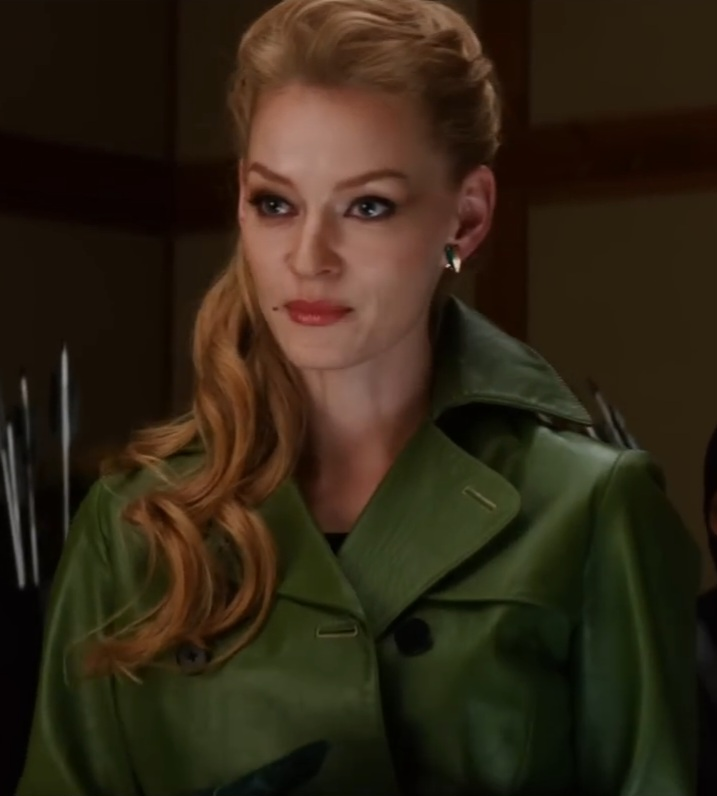
Viper, portrayed by Svetlana Khodchenkova

Viper appears in The Wolverine, portrayed by Svetlana Khodchenkova. Due to rights issues between 20th Century Fox and Marvel Studios at the time, she is not referred to as "Madame Hydra" nor is her affiliation with the organization referenced. Instead, this version is a mutant scientist known as "Dr. Green" who can shed her skin (which can grant immunity to new toxins at the cost of her hair), produce acidic saliva, and possesses both an immunity and mastery of toxins. Ichirō Yashida hires Viper to help transfer Logan's healing factor to him as well as monitor Kenuichio Harada's ninja clan. Viper is later killed while fighting Yukio.

=== Video games ===
- Ophelia Sarkissian / Madame Hydra appears as a boss in Captain America: Super Soldier, voiced by Audrey Wasilewski.
- Ophelia Sarkissian / Viper appears as the first boss of Marvel: Avengers Alliance.
- Ophelia Sarkissian / Viper appears as a boss in Marvel: Avengers Alliance Tactics.
- Ophelia Sarkissian / Madame Hydra appears in Marvel Heroes, voiced by Tasia Valenza.
- Ophelia Sarkissian / Viper appears in Lego Marvel Super Heroes, voiced by Kari Wahlgren.
- Ophelia Sarkissian / Viper appears in Lego Marvel's Avengers.
- Ophelia Sarkissian / Madame Hydra appears as a boss in Marvel Avengers Academy.
- Ophelia Sarkissian / Madame Hydra appears in Marvel Powers United VR, voiced again by Vanessa Marshall.
- Ophelia Sarkissian / Viper appears as a playable character in Marvel: Future Fight.
- Ophelia Sarkissian / Viper appears in Marvel Snap.

=== Merchandise ===
In 2022, Hasbro released an Ophelia Sarkissian / Madame Hydra action figure as part of the Marvel Legends action figure line.

=== Miscellaneous ===
- Ophelia Sarkissian / Madame Hydra appears in the Spider-Woman: Agent of S.W.O.R.D. motion comic, voiced by Nicolette Reed.
- Ophelia Sarkissian / Madame Hydra appears in Marvel Universe Live!.
