= Mark Gruenwald =

American comic book writer (1953–1996)

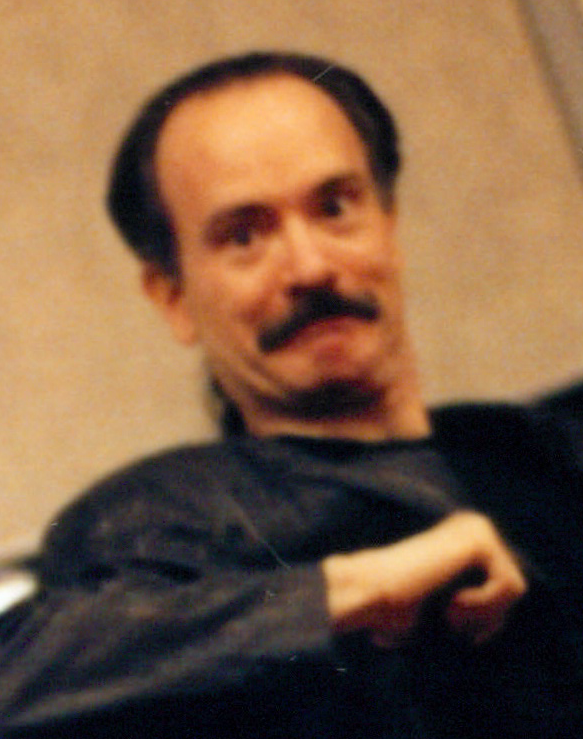
- Gruenwald at a comic convention in New York City in the early 1990s
- Born: Mark Eugene Gruenwald; June 18, 1953 Oshkosh, Wisconsin, U.S.
- Died: August 12, 1996 (aged 43) Pawling, New York, U.S.
- Areas: Writer, Penciller, Editor
- Notable works: Captain America; Squadron Supreme; Quasar; DP7
- Awards: Comics Buyer's Guide Fan Award, 1987, 1996
- Spouses: Belinda Glass (m. 1981; div. 1988) Catherine Schuller (m. 1992)
- Children: 1

Mark Eugene Gruenwald (/ˈɡruːnwɔːld/ GROON-wawld; June 18, 1953 – August 12, 1996) was an American comic book writer, editor, and occasional penciler known for his long association with Marvel Comics.

== Career ==
=== Early career ===
Gruenwald got his start in comics fandom, publishing his own fanzine, Omniverse, which explored the concept of continuity. Before being hired by Marvel, he wrote text articles for DC Comics’ official fanzine, The Amazing World of DC Comics. Articles by Gruenwald include "The Martian Chronicles" (a history of the Martian Manhunter) in issue #13 and several articles on the history of the Justice League in issue #14.

=== Entry to Marvel ===
In 1978 he was hired by Marvel Comics, where he remained for the rest of his career. Hired initially as an assistant editor in January 1978, Gruenwald was promoted to full editorship by Marvel editor-in-chief Jim Shooter in 1982, putting Gruenwald in charge of The Avengers, Captain America, Iron Man, Thor, Spider Woman, and What If. During this period, he shared an office with writer/editor Denny O'Neil, whom Gruenwald considered a mentor.

=== Penciler ===
During the years 1982–1984, Gruenwald did pencil work for a handful of Marvel comics, most notably the 1983 Hawkeye limited series, but also issues of What If?, Marvel Team-Up Annual, The Incredible Hulk, and Questprobe.

The cover of Comic Reader #180 (May–June 1980) featuring Hawkman and Adam Strange and the entry for Merlyn the Archer in Who's Who: the Definitive Directory of the DC Universe #15 (May 1986) were Gruenwald's only comics artwork outside of Marvel.

=== Writer ===
In 1982, Gruenwald, Steven Grant, and Bill Mantlo co-wrote Marvel Super Hero Contest of Champions, the first limited series published by Marvel Comics. As a writer, Gruenwald is known for creating the Official Handbook of the Marvel Universe and his ten-year stint as the writer of Captain America (from 1985 to 1995) – during which he contributed several notable characters such as Crossbones, Diamondback, and U.S. Agent. He made a deliberate effort to create villains who would be specific to Captain America, as opposed to generic foes who could as easily have been introduced in another comic. At one point, Gruenwald owned a replica of Captain America's shield – the same shield now owned by Stephen Colbert.

His 60-issue run on Quasar (1989–1994) realized Gruenwald's ambition to write his own kind of superhero. However, he considered his magnum opus to be the mid-1980s 12-issue maxiseries Squadron Supreme, which told the story of an alternate universe where a group of well-intended superheroes decide that they would be best suited to run the planet. Gruenwald was highly loyal to each series he wrote. In addition to his lengthy stint on Captain America, he wrote the entire runs of both Quasar (save for one issue) and D.P.7, and Jim Salicrup recalled that when Gruenwald was taken off of Spider-Woman after only 12 issues, he "was crushed."

=== Executive editor ===
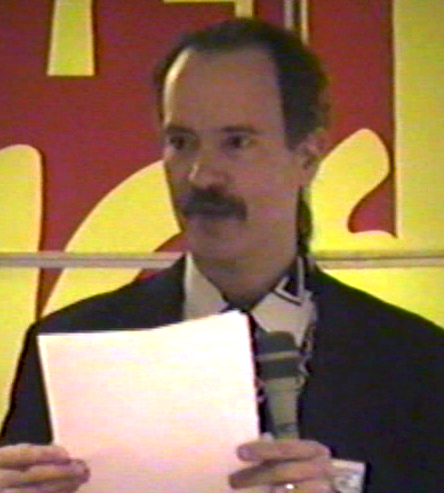
Gruenwald at a comics convention panel in the early 1990s

On September 1, 1987, Gruenwald became Marvel's executive editor, with a particular remit as the keeper of continuity. Gruenwald was famous for a perfect recollection of even the most trivial details.

In the pages of Fantastic Four, Walt Simonson paid homage to Gruenwald by having the Time Variance Authority (TVA)'s staff all be clones of Gruenwald; no one could keep track of everything but him.

Gruenwald was a recurring character with Tom DeFalco in the single-panel comic The Bull's Eye that ran in Marvel comics in the late 1980s–early 1990s, created by Rick Parker and Barry Dutter. These strips, which ran on the Bullpen Bulletins page during the majority of DeFalco's run as editor-in-chief, featured Gruenwald depicted as a caricature and foil for DeFalco's antics.

== Personal life and death ==
Gruenwald married singer Belinda Glass in May 1981. They later divorced, and he married Catherine Schuller on October 12, 1992, in New York after a year's courtship; she was the executor of Gruenwald's will. Gruenwald had a daughter, Sara.

In 1996, Gruenwald died from a heart attack, the result of an unsuspected congenital heart defect. Gruenwald was a well-known practical joker and, due to his young age, many of his friends and co-workers initially believed the reports of his death to be a joke. A longtime lover of comics, Gruenwald made it known among his friends and family that he desired to have his ashes used in part of a comic. In accordance with his request, he was cremated, and his ashes were mixed with the ink used to print the first printing of the trade paperback compilation of Squadron Supreme.

== Legacy ==
The Amalgam Comics book The Exciting X-Patrol #1 (June 1997) and the Marvel Comics book Generation X #21 (November 1996), "Valkyrie" #1 (January 1997) are dedicated to Gruenwald's memory as was Peter Parker: Spider-Man #75 which saw the return of Norman Osborn after his supposed death twenty years earlier.

In the DC Universe, a building in Gotham City was named the Von Gruenwald Tower, and in the novel Captain America: Liberty's Torch written by Jenny Blake Isabella and Bob Ingersoll, the lawyer kidnapped to defend the similarly kidnapped Captain America in a mock trial before a militia is named Mark Gruenwald, and is described with the same general physical attributes and personality as the real Gruenwald. The lawyer acts heroically throughout the story.

In Richard Starkings' Elephantmen, the executive director of the Information Agency where almost all of the main characters of the series work is called Gruenwald and bears a strong resemblance to Gruenwald. In an interview with Newsarama, Starkings confirmed that the character was based on his friend.

In volume four of Nova from Marvel Comics, the new director of Project Pegasus is named Dr. Gruenwald.

In 2006, Gruenwald was officially named the "Patron Saint of Marveldom" in the "Bullpen Bulletins".

In the Marvel Cinematic Universe (MCU) show Loki, TVA analyst Mobius M. Mobius is portrayed by Owen Wilson, and is made to resemble Gruenwald's likeness.

Jason Olsen's Mark Gruenwald and the Star Spangled Symbolism of Captain America, 1985-1995, a book about Gruenwald's run on Captain America, was published by McFarland & Company in 2021.

== Selected bibliography ==
=== Regular writer ===
- Spider-Woman #9–20 (December 1978 – November 1979) – (#17–20 with outside plot assists)
- Marvel Two-in-One #53–58, 60–72 (July 1979 – February 1981) – (co-writer #53-58, 60, 64–72)
- Thor #299-302, 304–307 (September 1980 – May 1981) – (co-writer)
- Thor #303 (January 1981) – (second story), 311–314 (September 1981 – December 1981) – (Tales of Asgard story; co-writer)
- What If? #25–28 (February 1981 – August 1981) – (Eternals story)
- Marvel Super Hero Contest of Champions #1–3 (June 1982 – August 1982) – (limited series; co-writer)
- Official Handbook of the Marvel Universe #1–15 (January 1983 – March 1984) – (limited series; co-writer #4–14)
- Hawkeye #1–4 (September 1983 – December 1983) – (limited series)
- Captain America #307–422, 424–443, Annual #8, 10-12 (July 1985 – September 1995)
- Squadron Supreme #1–12 (September 1985 – August 1986) – (limited series)
- The Official Handbook of the Marvel Universe (vol. 2) #1–20 (December 1985 – March 1987) – (limited series; co-writer)
- D.P.7 #1–32, Annual #1 (November 1986 – June 1989)
- The Pitt (March 1988) – (one-shot; co-writer)
- The Draft (July 1988) – (one-shot; co-writer)
- "The Saga of the High Evolutionary: Parts 1–11" (1988) – (back-up story in most 1988 Marvel Annuals)
- Squadron Supreme: Death of a Universe (1989) – (one-shot)
- Quasar #1–58, 60 (October 1989 – July 1994)
- The Avengers #319–324 (July 1990 – October 1990) – (Avengers Crew back-up stories)
- U.S. Agent #1–4 (June 1993 – September 1993) – (limited series)
- Avengers: The Terminatrix Objective #1–4 (September 1993 – December 1993) – (limited series)
- Starblast #1–4 (January 1994 – April 1994) – (limited series)
- Starmasters #1–3 (December 1995 – February 1996) – (limited series)
- Combo Man #1 (January 1996) – (one-shot)
- Captain America: The Legend #1 (September 1996) – (one-shot)
- Thor: The Legend #1 (September 1996) – (one-shot)

=== Fill-in writer ===
- Thor #281–282 (March 1979 – April 1979), #318 (second story) – (April 1982) – (co-writer)
- The Defenders #77 (November 1979) – (co-writer)
- The Avengers #185–187 (July 1979 – September 1979) – (co-writer)
- The Avengers #189 (November 1979) – (co-writer)
- "The First Celestial Host!" What If? #23 (October 1980) – (Celestials story)
- The Amazing Spider-Man #208 (September 1980) – (co-writer)
- ROM #24 (November 1981) – (co-writer)
- Marvel Team-Up #113 (January 1982)
- "Gore Galore." Bizarre Adventures #31 (April 1982) – (Hangman story)
- What If? #32 (April 1982) – (Avengers story)
- The Defenders #108–109 (June 1982 – July 1982) – (co-writer)
- "The Prophet." Bizarre Adventures #32 (August 1982) – (Aquarian story)
- What If? #34 (August 1982) – (co-writer)
- Marvel Team-Up Annual #5 (1982)
- ROM Annual #1 (1982) – (co-writer)
- Thor Annual #10 (1982) – (co-writer)
- Bizarre Adventures #34 (February 1983)
- "What if the Universe Ceased to Exist?" What If? #43 (February 1984)
- Fantastic Four Annual #18 (November 1984) – (co-writer)
- Daredevil #234 (September 1986)
- Kickers, Inc. #5 (March 1987) – (co-writer)
- New Mutants Annual #4 (1988)
- Justice #15 (January 1988) – (co-writer)
- The Avengers #290 (April 1988) – (co-writer)
- West Coast Avengers vol. 2 #40 (January 1989)
- "The Initiation of Quasar." The Avengers Annual #18 (1989) – (Quasar story)
- "Inferno Aftermath." X-Factor Annual #4 (1989)
- "Rate the Hunks." Avengers West Coast Annual #4 (1989)
- "It Came From Within." Marvel Comics Presents #29 (October 1989) – (Quasar story)
- "The Savior of Lost Artifacts." Fantastic Four Annual #22 (1989)
- "Acts of Vengeance: Epilogue." Avengers Annual #19 (1990)
- "Girls Don't Wanna Have Fun!" Impossible Man Summer Vacation Spectacular #1 (August 1990) – (Quasar story; co-writer)
- The Avengers #325 (October 1990)
- "Brothers." Captain America Annual #10 (1991) – (Bushmaster story)
- "Test Flight." Captain America Annual #11 (1992) – (Falcon story; co-writer)
- Fantastic Four Annual #25 (1992) – (Citizen Kang, Part 3)
- Avengers Annual #21 (1992) – (Citizen Kang, Part 4)
- Fantastic Four Annual #27 (1994)
- Over the Edge #2 (December 1995) – (Doctor Strange story)
- Fantastic Four: The Legend #1 (October 1996) – (one-shot)
- Sensational Spider-Man '96 #1 (November 1996) – (Spider-Woman story; one-shot)

=== Penciller ===
- What If? #32 (April 1982) – (Avengers story; co-penciller; inks also)
- What If? #34 (August 1982) – (co-penciller)
- Marvel Team-Up Annual #5 (1982)
- The Incredible Hulk vol. 2 #279 (January 1983)
- Hawkeye #1–4 (September 1983 – December 1983) – (limited series)
- "What if the Universe Ceased to Exist?" What If? #43 (February 1984)
- Questprobe #1 (August 1984)

=== Editor-in-Chief ===
- Fantastic Four #397–410 (December 1994 – January 1996)
- Namor the Sub-Mariner #60–62 (January 1995 – March 1995)
- Fantastic Force #5–17 (January 1995 – January 1996)
- Force Works #9–19 (March 1995 – January 1996)
- Silver Surfer vol. 3 #102–105 (March 1995 – June 1995)

=== Executive Editor ===
- The War #1–4 (June 1989 – March 1990)

=== Editor ===
- What If? #17–18 (October 1979 – December 1979)
- Man-Thing #1–3 (November 1979 – March 1980)
- Fantastic Four #216–217 (March 1980 – April 1980)
- Marvel Treasury Edition #25 (June 1980) – (Hulk and Spider-Man story)
- Iron Man #160–232 (July 1982 – July 1988)
- Captain America #272–288 (August 1982 – December 1983)
- Captain America #290–306 (February 1984 – June 1985)
- Captain America Annual #6–7 (1982–1983)
- Thor #322–338 (August 1982 – December 1983)
- Thor #340–354 (February 1984 – April 1985)
- Thor #356 (June 1985)
- Thor Annual #10–13 (1982–1985)
- The Avengers #223–242 (September 1982 – April 1984)
- Avengers Annual #11–17 (1982–1988)
- Hercules #1–4 (September 1982 – December 1982)
- Marvel Two-in-One #91 (September 1982)
- Spider-Woman #46–50 (October 1982 – June 1983)
- What If? #35–37 (October 1982 – February 1983)
- The Vision and the Scarlet Witch #1–4 (November 1982 – February 1983) – (limited series)
- Official Handbook of the Marvel Universe #1–15 (January 1983 – May 1984) – (limited series)
- West Coast Avengers #1–4 (September 1984 – January 1985) – (limited series)
- The Avengers #252–303 (February 1985 – May 1989)
- The Thing #23–36 (May 1985 – June 1986)
- West Coast Avengers vol. 2 #1–35 (October 1985 – August 1988)
- West Coast Avengers Annual #1–3 (1986–1988)
- The Official Handbook of the Marvel Universe vol. 2 #1–20 (December 1985 – February 1988) – (limited series)
- The X-Men vs. The Avengers #1–4 (April 1987 – July 1987)
- Solo Avengers #1–20 (December 1987 – July 1989)
- Avengers Spotlight #21–40 (August 1989 – January 1991)
- Nick Fury vs. S.H.I.E.L.D. #1–6 (June 1988 – November 1988) – (limited series)
- Black Panther vol. 2 #1–4 (July 1988 – October 1988) – (limited series)
- The Star Brand #14 (July 1988)
- Wolverine/Nick Fury: The Scorpio Connection (1989) – (graphic novel)
- Captain Marvel vol. 2 #1 (November 1989) – (one-shot)
- Inhumans Special #1 (April 1990) – (one-shot)
- Marvel Super-Heroes vol. 2 #1–2 (May 1990 – July 1990)
- X-Men Spotlight on... Starjammers #1–2 (May 1990 – June 1990) – (limited series)
- Black Knight #1–4 (June 1990 – September 1990) – (limited series)
- The Avengers #382 (January 1995)
- Rune/Silver Surfer #1 (Malibu Comics/Marvel Comics, April 1995) – (one-shot)
- Cosmic Powers Unlimited #1–5 (May 1995 – May 1996)
- Inhumans: The Great Refuge #1 (May 1995) – (one-shot)
- Silver Surfer (vol. 3) #106–122 (July 1995 – November 1996)
- Thunderstrike #23 (August 1995)
- Lunatik #1–3 (December 1995 – February 1996) – (limited series)
- Captain Marvel #1–6 (December 1995 – May 1996)
- DC Versus Marvel/Marvel Versus DC #1–4 (DC Comics/Marvel Comics, February 1996 – May 1996)
- The Avengers #398–402 (May 1996 – September 1996)
- Iron Man #328–332 (May 1996 – September 1996)
- Avengers Unplugged #5–6 (June 1996 – August 1996)
- Uncanny Origins #1–2 (September 1996 – October 1996)
- Incredible Hulk: Hercules Unleashed #1 (October 1996) – (one-shot)
- Journey into Mystery #503–505 (November 1996 – January 1997)
- Batman/Captain America (DC Comics/Marvel Comics, December 1996) – (one-shot)
- Silver Surfer/Superman #1 (DC Comics/Marvel Comics, January 1997) – (one-shot)
- Superman/Fantastic Four (DC Comics/Marvel Comics, April 1999) – (one-shot)

=== Assistant Editor ===
- John Carter, Warlord of Mars #14 (July 1978)
- What If? #11–16 (October 1978 – August 1979)
- Howard the Duck #30 (March 1979)
- Battlestar Galactica #1–2 (March 1979 – April 1979)
- Marvel Preview #19 (Summer 1979)
- What If? #19–28 (February 1980 – August 1981)
- Conan the Barbarian #113–115 (August 1980 – October 1980)
- What If? #31 (February 1982)

=== Colorist ===
- "Out of His Skull" in Captain America #369 (April 1990) – (Red Skull story)

Preceded by Tom DeFalco	Marvel Comics Group Editors-in-Chief: Avengers titles Bob Budiansky, Spider-Man titles Bobbie Chase, Marvel Edge titles Bob Harras, X-Men titles Carl Potts, licensed-property titles 1994–1995	Succeeded by Bob Harras
Preceded by David Anthony Kraft, Roger Slifer	Marvel Two-in-One writer (with Ralph Macchio); 1978–1981	Succeeded by Tom DeFalco
Preceded by Roy Thomas	Thor writer (with Ralph Macchio); 1980–1981	Succeeded by Doug Moench
Preceded by Mike Carlin	Captain America writer 1985–1995	Succeeded by Mark Waid
Preceded by John Byrne	Avengers writer 1990 (back-up stories; main stories by Fabian Nicieza)	Succeeded by Larry Hama
