= List of Marvel Disk Wars: The Avengers episodes =

Marvel Disk Wars: The Avengers is an anime television series produced by Toei Animation in collaboration with Walt Disney Japan and Marvel Entertainment. After the evil villain Loki uses Tony Stark's own technology to trap several heroes and villains inside containers known as DISKs, a group of five kids end up with the power to unleash these superheroes. Teaming up with Captain America, Iron Man, the Hulk, Thor, and Wasp, the kids travel the world searching for the DISKs before they fall into his evil hands. The series began airing in Japan on TV Tokyo and other TXN stations from April 2, 2014. The opening and ending themes are "Tsuki Yabureru - Time to SMASH!" (突キ破レル-Time to SMASH!, Break On Through - Time to SMASH!) and "Thread of Fate" respectively, both performed by T.M.Revolution. An English dub began airing on July 6, 2015, on Disney XD (Southeast Asia).

== Episode list ==
No.	Title / Dub Title	Directed by	Written by	Storyboards	Animation director(s)	Original release date
1	"The Mightiest Heroes! / Mightiest Heroes"; Transliteration: "Saikyō no Yūsha-tachi!" (Japanese: 最強の勇者たち！)	Hideki Hiroshima	Ryū King	Kimitoshi Chioka	Yukihiro Kitano	April 2, 2014
Akira Akatsuki is excited to learn that his father, Nozomu, has completed his two-year project for Stark International and has invited him and his older brother, Hikaru, to the Raft. After narrowly missing their flight, Akira and Hikaru are escorted to the Raft by Pepper Potts, courtesy of Tony Stark. During this time, a special presentation on the Raft is being held with several superheroes and VIPs in attendance, including three children, Edward Grant, Chris Taylor, and Jessica Shannon. Upon reuniting with his father, Akira is not particular happy that Tony is taking credit for Nozomu's project, the DISK system, which is designed for capturing supervillains, though Nozomu's assistant, Peter Parker, assures Akira it is because they wanted to protect them. Unbeknownst to anyone, mysterious characters sneak into the cells of the supervillains and help them escape by storing them inside the aforementioned DISKs. Whilst Edward, Chris, and Jessica sneak off to try to get closer to their favorite superheroes, Loki suddenly appears above the Raft and uses the DISKs to unleash supervillains all over the island. When Akira, Hikaru, and Nozomu are attacked by Crimson Dynamo, who is looking for an 'installer', they are assisted by the arrival of Spider-Man. Introducing characters: Abomination, Absorbing Man, Baron Zemo, Beast, Captain America, Crimson Dynamo, Cyclops, Doctor Strange, Green Goblin, Hulk, Iron Fist, Iron Man, King Cobra, Loki, MODOK, Pepper Potts, Phil Coulson, Spider-Man, Thor, Tiger Shark, War Machine, Wasp, Whirlwind
2	"All Heroes Exterminated?! / Loki's Victory"; Transliteration: "Hīrō Zenmetsu!?" (Japanese: ヒーロー全滅!?)	Morio Hatano	Ryū King	Morio Hatano	Akira Takahashi	April 9, 2014
After Spider-Man deals with the Crimson Dynamo, Nozomu gives the biocode installer to Akira and Hikaru, urging them to escape with Spider-Man to the heliport via an escape route, where they run into Edward, Chris, and Jessica. Meanwhile, as the other superheroes try to deal with the crisis on the island, S.H.I.E.L.D. headquarters is also attacked by supervillains, prompting Nick Fury to step into action. As Spider-Man is separated from the group when he is confronted by Green Goblin, King Cobra takes Pepper hostage, leaving the heroes unable to put up any resistance against Loki, who uses the DISKs to imprison many of the heroes; moving on to Iron Man, Thor, Captain America, and Wasp. As Akira states his desire to save Pepper and the heroes, Hikaru comes up with a plan. Introducing characters: Maria Hill, Nick Fury, Wrecker
3	"Iron Man, Reborn! / Iron Man Returns"; Transliteration: "Fukkatsu! Aian Man" (Japanese: 復活! アイアンマン)	Makoto Sonoda	Ryū King	Toshiaki Komura	Mitsunori Yamaguchi; Osamu Ishikawa	April 16, 2014
In an attempt to free Pepper, Akira attempts to trick King Cobra under an avalanche of crates, but fails. Chris arrives with a forklift and knocks the crates down, but King Cobra slips out. While Loki is in the middle of imprisoning the rest of the heroes, Iron Man frees himself and takes down King Cobra, while the kids free Pepper. The celebration is cut short when Loki arrives with Tom and MODOK, who destroys the biocode installer. At the same time, S.H.I.E.L.D. is detained by Cottonmouth. Iron Man tricks Loki into firing a burst of energy that supercharges the remains of the installer, integrating a biocode into each of the kids. Tom traps Iron Man in a DISK, which is then taken by Spider-Man, who instructs Akira to send Iron Man out to finish the job. Akira and Loki's wristbands make contact with each other during a scuffle, causing all the DISKs in the immediate area to fall into a pocket dimension. Loki withdraws with Tom, and Nick Fury arrives at the scene after the battle and takes Akira and Hikaru into S.H.I.E.L.D. custody.
4	"Hawkeye the Supporter / Hawkeye to the Rescue"; Transliteration: "Suketto Hōkuai" (Japanese: 助っ人ホークアイ)	Hidehito Ueda	Ryū King	Hidehito Ueda	Shū'ichirō Manabe; Hideki Hashimoto; Shun'ryō Yamamura	April 23, 2014
After the events at the Raft, Akira and Hikaru are taken aboard the Helicarrier while the other three are sent safely home. There, Nick Fury and Iron Man reveal that because the biocode installer was damaged, the kids have a Limited Biocode, which only allows the released heroes to be outside the DISKs for a few minutes and requires hours to recharge. A man by the name of Senator Robert enters with incriminating photos of Fury, Tim, and Loki, leading to Fury's arrest and the temporary decommission of S.H.I.E.L.D. During all this, Spider-Man has recovered the DISKs containing Thor, Captain America, Hulk, and Wasp. Robert denies permission for S.H.I.E.L.D. to intervene when Lizard is seen on a rampage, leading Akira, Iron Man, and Spider-Man to intervene on their own. After Lizard is D-Secured, Iron Man runs out of time and a blonde masked woman (Rosetta Riley in disguise) sends out Diamondback to finish the job with the other two. Meanwhile, Hawkeye approaches Hikaru with a DISK wristband and offers him the chance to help off the radar. Introducing characters: Diamondback, Hawkeye, Lizard
5	"The Mighty Thor Descends! / Mighty Thor Unleashed"; Transliteration: "Maiti Sō Kōrin" (Japanese: マイティ・ソー降臨)	Miho Hirayama	Ryū King	Hiroki Shibata	Yoshitaka Yashima	April 30, 2014
Hikaru accepts Hawkeye's offer and parachutes down to a building near the scuffle with Diamondback against direct orders from Robert and Hill. With a little help from Akira, Hawkeye manages to leave Diamondback distracted long enough for Hikaru to stop the disguised Riley from stealing more DISKs from within a bank. Unfortunately, Riley sends out King Cobra to send Hikaru flying. After being caught by Spider-Man and handed Thor's DISK, Hikaru releases Thor, who interrupts King Cobra's offer to finish the kids off in exchange for permanent freedom with a hammer toss. Diamondback throws a fragment bomb diamond to ensnare everyone, but Thor uses a whirlwind/lightning combination to destroy the bomb and force Diamondback to surrender. Riley is forced to withdraw King Cobra and escape with Tim and MODOK, as Hikaru and Thor introduce each other formally. Later, Pepper and Iron Man give Akira and Hikaru a place to stay in New York while the crisis continues. Robert mulls over S.H.I.E.L.D.'s failure with his reflection, and in said reflection is the face of Loki.
6	"Hulk's Great Rampage! / Rampaging Hulk"; Transliteration: "Haruku Dai Bōsō" (Japanese: ハルク大暴走!!)	Ryōta Nakamura	Ryū King	Yoshitaka Yashima	Yukihiro Kitano	May 7, 2014
Spider-Man tries to convince Chris to help out with the DISK effort, but Chris refuses due to sheer lack of interest. Spider-Man begrudgingly admits defeat in the manner, considering how Ed refused due to overwhelming cowardice and Jessica due to being preoccupied with luxuries. After tossing Captain America's DISK to Chris regardless, Spider-Man is attacked by Joel and Abomination. The two manage to get away with the DISKs containing Wasp and Hulk, as well as Spider-Man himself. Meanwhile, Jessica and Ed are captured and locked up in a frigate by Menino. After Chris escapes Joel with help from Iron Man, Captain America confers with the team from within his DISK until Chris disconnects the wristband. Chris, remembering an argument with his parents about his uncertain future, decides to rejoin the team after seeing the Hulk on the news. Hulk, under Diablo's control, goes on a destructive rampage, forcing the team (including Chris) to go into action. While Jessica and Ed use their wits to find a way out of their cell, Iron Man and Thor are defeated by Hulk, who sees them as monsters of their own. With all the adrenaline overriding his uncertainty, Chris finally releases Captain America, who prepares to stand and face the Hulk. Introducing characters: Diablo
7	"Hulk VS. Captain! / Captain America vs. Hulk"; Transliteration: "Haruku Tai Kyaputen" (Japanese: ハルク対キャプテン)	Gō Koga	Ryū King	Gō Koga	Akira Takahashi	May 14, 2014
Captain America begins to face Hulk, still on a rampage from Diablo's alchemic control, and starts by playing defense with his vibranium shield to gauge the situation. While Hulk is distracted, Akira and Hikaru recall Iron Man and Thor, who desperately needed time to recover. After forcing Hulk to tire himself out, Captain America goes from playing defense to outwitting Hulk to forcing him into a test of endurance, which Hulk loses. Akira secures Hulk in a new DISK, freeing him from his control. Meanwhile, Jessica and Ed escape their room on the frigate to where Spider-Man is being kept, and are found by Tim. Jessica takes out Wasp's DISK and a wristband, having snuck through the air vents to the room where they were kept, and releases Wasp. Despite Tim's intervention with an extremely arrogant MODOK, Wasp frees Spider-Man and helps Jessica and Ed escape while Spider-Man decides to stay and keep MODOK, Diablo, Abomination, and Whirlwind. As King Cobra closes in on their position in the air shafts, Jessica and Wasp send Ed to put out an S.O.S., which is picked up by the team. Seeing as how Whirlwind's tornado shielding makes it impossible for the Stark Industries Jet to make it through to the frigate, Akira tries D-Smashing Hulk, the only one who could make it through, but to no avail.
8	"The Avengers Assemble! / Avengers Assemble"; Transliteration: "Seizoroi Abenjāzu" (Japanese: 勢揃いアベンジャーズ)	Makoto Sonoda	Ryū King	Eisaku Inoue	Naoki Tate	May 21, 2014
While trying to solve the puzzle of Whirlwind's tornado, Tony's mind flashbacks to when he and Nozomu and Peter Parker were working on the DISK, and how talking about Nozomu's two sons helped come up with the classification systems, and how the party came into being. In the present, Iron Man explains how every hero and villain is split into one of the five classes, and that every Biocode is permanently locked onto the first one D-Smashed. This explains how Akira, locked to Tech-class DISKS, failed to D-Smash Hulk and then as an example Thor. On the frigate, Loki's five masked colleagues wait impatiently for him. While King Cobra captures Jessica and Riley takes the DISK containing Wasp, Iron Man asks to be released and sent to face the tornado with Hulk's DISK and a wristband in hand. After barely making it through alive with as much moral support as possible from Akira (despite the dissuasions from the rest of his team) Ed catches Hulk's DISK and attracts attention while heading the wristband. Biting King Cobra to get free, Jessica tosses Ed the wristband. Hulk, upon being released by Ed, faces against what's left against Diablo's alchemic control, knocking the villain into Whirlwind and knocking out the tornado. Captain America and Thor join Iron Man and Hulk on the ground, and thanks to some learned trickery Jessica brings Wasp back into the mix after getting her DISK back from Riley. With the heroes, villains, and their DISK-controlling partners all lined up for battle, Captain America finishes the episode with the iconic battle cry: "Avengers Assemble!"
9	"Spider-Man is Missing! / End of Spider-Man"; Transliteration: "Kieta Supaidāman" (Japanese: 消えたスパイダーマン)	Morio Hatano	Ryū King	Morio Hatano	Osamu Ishikawa	May 28, 2014
Reunited at last on the frigate, the Avengers face off against Loki's cohorts while the harshly weakened Spider-Man struggles to survive below deck. Everything seems to be going well until Loki arrives disguised as Hikaru, tricking Thor into taking a Cane Blast point blank. Seeing the need to retreat, Loki orders Abomination to sink the Frigate, and then retreat. Jessica and Ed manage to capture a defeated Whirlwind, Diablo, and King Cobra while Captain America, Hulk, and Wasp try to find Spider-Man before it's too late. Spider-Man, dreaming of his "reported demise" and "triumphant return" to New York, wakes up to find the Avengers carrying him out of the ship. Later, while the team is having a celebration, Senator Robert closes in on Stark's penthouse in New York with a new warrant for either registration or arrest. However, the team is safely in one of Stark's Japan penthouses instead. Captain America offers Hawkeye to join the team, who declines due to his determination to take the corruption out of S.H.I.E.L.D. The next day, Akira and Iron Man find themselves in a dojo belonging to an old friend and bitter enemy of Stark's, the Silver Samurai. Introducing characters: Silver Samurai
10	"Showdown! The Silver-Donned Samurai! / Showdown with Silver Samurai"; Transliteration: "Taiketsu! Gin'iro no Samurai" (Japanese: 対決！銀色のサムライ)	Hideki Hiroshima	Ryū King	Yoshitaka Yashima	Shin'ichi Sakuma	June 4, 2014
Iron Man and Akira try to negotiate a cease-fire between the Avengers and the Japanese criminal empire of the Silver Samurai from within the dojo of the latter. The rest of the team anxiously waits and watches from outside, with Pepper keeping an eye on things remotely. Iron Man mentions to Silver Samurai that in order to repay an old debt, he has to swear to keep out of the DISK business altogether in addition to not interfering with the Avengers' safety in Japan. Akira, who thinks Stark has gone crazy, interrupts the negotiations, prompting Silver Samurai to send in his bodyguards. Silver Samurai decides that the best way to resolve this is with a duel between his sword and Akira's D-Smash, to see which is faster. Hikaru bursts into the dojo's entrance from the outside, forcing a conflict between the security staff of the dojo and the remaining Avengers. Silver Samurai's duel proceeds as planned, despite Iron Man's objections, and Akira wins. Holding to the agreement, both parties depart from the dojo. Later, Peter Parker stops by the base with a video recording from Spider-Man, who explains he has to stay in America. Peter nearly reveals his identity as Spider-Man when the team asks him to pass on their thanks, but manages to keep it to himself. Everyone pairs off and heads to bed, with a new mission ahead of them.
11	"A Present From Tony! / Akira Goes Turbo"; Transliteration: "Tonī-kara no Puresento" (Japanese: トニーからのプレゼント)	Hiroki Shibata	Toshimitsu Takeuchi	Hiroki Shibata	Yoshitaka Yashima	June 11, 2014
Hikaru and Pepper secure the DISKs that the team has obtained so far while everyone else is at their own activity. Jessica spends time trying on new clothes at a fashion shop, Ed spends time showing off his knowledge at a superhero memorabilia store, and Chris spends time sampling Japanese cuisine at a restaurant. Iron Man, attempting to build a new invention, directs Akira on what to do step-by-step, but ends up driving both him and Pepper crazy in the process. Eventually, Iron Man decides to compensate for this by building Akira a pair of jet-powered roller skates called Booster Skates. While testing them out outdoors, Akira and Iron Man find out the hard way that the Booster Skates have a bug in them that won't allow them to brake. Interrupting a brother-based conversation between Hikaru and Thor, Akira and his Booster Skates go out of control, and even Thor can't catch him due to an auto-evade feature Stark put in. Plus, Akira's biocode has yet to recharge. Pepper tries to call everyone else for help, but no one else answers. Eventually, Thor breaks the ground right in front of a dead end, launching him into the air for the catching, but his time limit expires. Hikaru catches Akira's arm, nearly dragging the both of them down. Akira's biocode finishes recharging at the nick of time, and Iron Man catches them. With everyone heading back home and later to bed, Iron Man and Pepper finish their work on the D-System, which can locate DISKs when they pop back into the world's dimension.
12	"The Unstoppable Force, Juggernaut! / The Unstoppable Juggernaut"; Transliteration: "Muteki Renpatsu! Jagānōto" (Japanese: 無敵連発!ジャガーノート)	Atsushi Takada	Makoto Koyama	Atsushi Takada	Tatsuya Oka; Shū'ichirō Manabe; Shun'ryō Yamamura	June 18, 2014
With the D-System fully operational, everyone heads out to a desert to locate a hidden DISK. Ed packs his bag too heavily, and ends up slowing everyone down. Chris offers to help him out, but expresses his disgust for Ed's weakness. They run into Joel and Absorbing Man, who accidentally reveal that Nozomu is in fact alive and well. Joel is summoned by a phone call from his agent, so he leaves Absorbing Man to take care of the Avengers. He completely withstands attacks from Wasp and Thor, but is eventually defeated and captured due to his arrogance. Meanwhile, Akira uses his new Booster Skates to carry himself and Ed on a chase after Joel, who blindsides them and sends Juggernaut to deal with them. Juggernaut nearly finishes off Iron Man, believing himself invincible, but Ed eventually stops hesitating and sends out Hulk to face Juggernaut. Hulk delivers a massive reverberating blow to Juggernaut's helmet, causing him to keel over in pain. Ed captures Juggernaut, and everyone returns to the base. In their room, Captain America tells Hulk that Ed's trying his best and it would do everyone good to be more accepting. In the lab, Tony and Pepper notice that everyone's time limit for their heroes has increased by a minute, but they decide to put a lid on it for the time being. Introducing characters: Juggernaut
13	"Gravity Control! Graviton! / The Grave Threat of Graviton"; Transliteration: "Jūryoku jōtō! Gurabiton" (Japanese: 重力上等!グラビトン)	Miho Hirayama	Toshimitsu Takeuchi	Kimitoshi Chioka	Yukihiro Kitano	June 25, 2014
While Wasp, Captain America, and Thor keep Tim and a couple of his Tech villains busy, Akira and Ed attempt to get their hands on a new DISK from a dangerous location in a construction site. Ed D-Smashes Hulk by mistake, shaking the structure and accidentally knocking the DISK down. Akira manages to catch it, though, and finds that inside is a new ally: Rhodey A.K.A. War Machine. After winning the battle for the Avengers, Rhodey officially introduces himself at the condo, and due to the DISKs' limitations has a back-and-forth conversation with Tony through Akira. Rhodey lets slip off-hand that he knows about Tony's "special night in Miami", infuriating Pepper and forcing him to request not to be released again in the near future. After the argument, Chris remarks to Ed that his hesitant attitude makes him the weak link in the team, and Captain America requests Chris to stop, mentioning "Bucky" off-hand. In Jotunheim, Loki demonstrates his disappointment at Tim by having Manino join him in the next DISK errand. As Ed sulks in his room, an alert reaches out to the team, and they are forced to leave without him. Inside a space center, Tim sends out MODOK and Manino sends out Graviton. Graviton overpowers the team entirely, making all their attacks useless. Back at the base, Hawkeye stops by the still-sulking Ed outside and uses reverse psychology to anger Hulk into giving Ed a moral boost. Hawkeye offers him a ride to the space center, where Graviton is pummeling the team with machinery and models found in the room by the time they get there. Graviton gets carried away, bringing MODOK, Tim, and Manino into the gravity wells he creates as well. Timing the D-Smash just right, Ed sends out Hulk to knock Graviton into his own gravity well, using his massive weight as an asset. Eventually, Tim and Manino are forced to D-Secure their villains and teleport away using a new escape device. With his confidence now restored, Ed sits back and relaxes knowing how useful he is to the team. Introducing characters: Graviton
14	"The Man Who Controls the Whips of Darkness! / Brothers Bond"; Transliteration: "Yami no Muchi o Ayatsuru Otoko" (Japanese: 闇のムチをあやつる男)	Kōji Ogawa	Toshimitsu Takeuchi	Kōji Ogawa	Akira Takahashi	July 2, 2014
Hikaru, Chris, Ed, and Jessica play a hero combat video game using their partner heroes as characters, and Jessica becomes very tired of Hikaru winning all the time. Insisting that such a perfect person like Hikaru must have some weakness, Jessica demands one more round on the game, but the power goes out before they get the chance. Akira had been playing with a mechanical arm and had accidentally cut the power temporarily, but since Hikaru didn't know that he used all the furniture he could to break down the doors on the way to where Akira is located. Hikaru is so worried about Akira's well-being, that he won't even let Tony finish a sentence on being vigilant. Jessica then realizes that Hikaru does have one weakness: he has a one-track mind when he is worried about Akira. Later, Thor tells Hikaru the story of Loki and how he came to be the villain he currently is, stating that it is his responsibility to halt his schemes, not unlike Hikaru's responsibility to take care of Akira. In Jotunheim, Loki announces his anger with how he and his partners are losing progress and decides to handle the next one in person. Both he and the Avengers get the signal for the next DISK, which is located in a chemical plant. In order to get to it, Thor has to use his lightning to power the computer and Iron Man has to hack the password using his armor. Before that can happen, Loki reaches out to Thor and invites him to "settle the score" a short distance away. Thor agrees, but Hikaru sees Loki's invitation as a plan to separate Thor from where he is needed and ensure victory. As Tim arrives at the plant, he runs into Iron Man and Thor, whereas the other three Avengers head out to take on Loki. Tim sends out Whiplash, who is defeated by Iron Man and Thor and D-Secured by Akira. Loki manages to evade the other three Avengers, as he and Tim return to Jotunheim. With the DISK recovered, the team heads back to the base, where Jessica still loses to Hikaru in the game despite making him think Akira was in danger and playing dirty.
15	"Searching For the Castle's Treasure! / Searching Deep in the Castle Keep"; Transliteration: "Shiro no hihō o Sagashidase" (Japanese: 城の秘宝をさがし出せ)	Hideki Hiroshima	Fumi Tsubota	Yoshitaka Yashima	Yoshitaka Yashima; Nao'aki Hōjō; Emi Hirano	July 9, 2014
When the next DISK appears to be located around Jessica's house in France, she offers the team a place to stay while they are going after it. However, when Akira thanks her, she states that it was done solely out of noblesse oblige and has nothing to do with friendship whatsoever. When they arrive, Jessica's parents greet the team, and Akira accidentally breaks a vase. Jessica's parents explain that Jessica's attitude comes from growing up without friends, so she considers them unnecessary. Later, the DISK is revealed to be somewhere in a series of tunnels. Akira and Jessica bicker along the way as one ends up saving the other from traps a few times. Eventually, Jessica declares her independence from the rest of the team and storms off, while the rest manage to locate the DISK. They are intercepted along the way by Tim and Doctor Octopus, who manages to disable Iron Man and prevent any other hero from being D-Smashed using his tentacles. Before Jessica can leave, Wasp decides to snap her out of her independent mood swing and tells her that noblesse oblige isn't just about the privileged helping the unprivileged, but also about teammates helping each other. She then returns to the battle scene, D-Smashing Wasp to outmaneuver Doctor Octopus' tentacles and free Iron Man. Together, they take out Doctor Octopus, D-Secure him, and obtain the DISK. Jessica and Akira make amends, then exit the tunnel system together for a treat. Introducing characters: Doctor Octopus
16	"Untamable Beasts! / Techno Isle Tokyo"; Transliteration: "Seigyo Funō no Yajū-tachi" (Japanese: 制御不能の野獣たち)	Gō Koga	Ryū King	Gō Koga	Naoki Tate	July 16, 2014
After seeing how managing schoolwork while staying around the base was proving difficult for everyone, Iron Man and Pepper decide to take everyone to Techno Isle Tokyo, a miniature city outfitted with the latest surveillance and security technology by Stark International. (Tony specifically decided to take them to the city's school, Techno Isle International Academy.) As it turns out, they are not alone, as Ōkuma and Riley are also in the city for other purposes. Establishing the double life the kids would have to lead, the Avengers gave them some last-minute advice and pep talks before they officially enroll. The day progresses well for everyone, which includes Akira meeting a girl named Noriko Ashida in a basketball game. Noriko is impressed by Nozomu's genetic work and asks Akira to get her copy of Nozomu's research autographed. This is interrupted by Hikaru who approaches and describes how the book and information within it is outdated. Noriko is captivated by Hikaru as he explains the book, but the discussion ends abruptly when Pepper calls in about a disturbance. The alert turns out to be a rampaging Sabretooth, who is destroying many buildings in the urban area of Techno Isle. Ed explains that Sabretooth is different than the villains faced so far, as he is a mutant. But before he can explain much more, a camera spots a few policemen about to be sliced. Iron Man rescues the policemen and tries to stop Sabretooth, but is defeated. Also, when the rest of the Avengers attempt to take him down with a final strike, Sabretooth's healing factor allows him to shrug off the attacks. The battle scene is then interrupted by Wolverine, who displays how he has found the DISK containing Cyclops. Wolverine expressed his frustration that Tony Stark allowed mutants to be drawn into the conflict, but switched to the matter at hand: A showdown between himself and Sabretooth. Introducing characters: Sabretooth, Surge, Wolverine
17	"That Man, Wolverine! / The Name is Wolverine"; Transliteration: "Sono otoko, Uruvarin" (Japanese: その男、ウルヴァリン)	Morio Hatano	Ryū King	Morio Hatano	Shin'ichi Sakuma	July 23, 2014
While Wolverine and Sabretooth are staring each other down, they are interrupted by three Destroyers. Sabretooth threatens Riley since she intervened, but Ōkuma and Manino D-Secure him, noticing that the DISK changed shape due to his mutant nature. Back on the battle scene, the Avengers take down one Destroyer while Wolverine takes down the other. A safe distance away, Iron Man apologizes for what happened to Cyclops and offers Wolverine to join the DISK-securing effort. That night, Noriko encounters Professor X's astral projection while sleeping. This distracts her the next day, as she tries to keep up with tutoring from Hikaru. Back at the base, Captain America watches Chris practice boxing in a mirror, as more memories of Bucky are stirred. In the city, Hikaru is escorting Noriko home when they encounter a gang mugging in progress. During the battle, Noriko discovers that she is a mutant with the ability to manipulate electricity. Wolverine then approaches Noriko, stating that he wants to take her to the Xavier Institute. Introducing characters: Destroyer, Professor X, Sentinels
18	"A Mutant Girl's Awakening! / A New Power Awakens"; Transliteration: "Myūtanto Shōjo Kakusei" (Japanese: ミュータント少女覚醒)	Hiroki Shibata	Fumi Tsubota	Hiroki Shibata	Osamu Ishikawa	July 30, 2014
Despite Noriko still being in shock, Wolverine tries to convince her to come to the Xavier Institute. She refuses, still in denial about being a mutant. Begging Hikaru to keep it a secret, she runs off. Later, the Avengers fight the Wrecking Crew while trying to get a DISK. The battle seems to be going in the favor of the Avengers, but Hikaru is still distracted by thoughts of Noriko, which nearly gets Thor beaten by Thunderball. After Iron Man swears revenge against Wrecker for his humiliation on the Raft, the Wrecker creates an earth tremor with his crowbar and sends construction equipment falling down. Hikaru doesn't notice, and Chris is forced to pull him out of the way, worrying Captain America. The Avengers defeat and D-Secure the Wrecking Crew, but Joel escapes with a new DISK. After seeing that Chris is okay, Captain America starts yelling at him, saying that he is untrained and should leave the difficult stunts to an Avenger. Chris angrily replies saying that they aren't partners like this, and how the Captain only wants to keep himself from reliving the loss of Bucky. Back at the base, Iron Man reveals that he knows Noriko is a mutant and could use her bioelectricity to free the heroes from the DISKs. Hikaru asks Iron Man to wait a while until she's ready, but Iron Man refuses. When they find Noriko later, Iron Man pressures her to help free them, but Noriko lashes out at them feeling betrayed by Hikaru, nearly hitting them with an electric blast. Wolverine intervenes and scolds Iron Man for treating Noriko like an item instead of a person, while Ōkuma watches from the distance. Introducing characters: Bulldozer, Piledriver, Thunderball
19	"The Stolen Heroes! / Stolen Heroes"; Transliteration: "Ubawareta Hīrō tachi" (Japanese: 奪われたヒーローたち)	Hideki Hiroshima	Toshimitsu Takeuchi	Kimitoshi Chioka	Yoshitaka Yashima	August 6, 2014
Wolverine tries to comfort Noriko, telling her that at the Xavier Institute she will have friends who have been through exactly the same thing and can help her learn to deal with being a mutant. He also tells her that trust is a big part of being a mutant, and how she really does need people she can rely on. Later that night, Hikaru apologizes to Noriko about the whole deal over coffee, stating how it doesn't matter to him what she is, and Noriko accepts the apology whole-heartedly. Before any more can be said, though, Hikaru is alerted to the fact that Chris is leaving. Hikaru D-Smashes Thor to make his way over, and is silently observed by Ōkuma. Back at the base, Chris is begged by Captain America to stay, asking where he went wrong as a mentor. Chris cuts Captain America off, storms off, and is approached by Thor and Hikaru. Chris explains how he didn't want a mentor to stand above him, he wanted a partner to be alongside. Even Ed's attempt to give Chris a guilt trip didn't stop him from leaving. Later, as the team is discussing how they'd fight without Captain America, Iron Man once again insists on recruiting Noriko, but Hikaru stops him entirely. Pepper interrupts, showing Noriko inside. Noriko announces that she is leaving for the Institute and wanted to stop by one last time first. Before she leaves, though, she decided to try and free everyone from the DISKs once. Noriko is given the DISKs for the remaining Avengers and War Machine, and some time alone in the lab to try and free them. However, while Jessica explains how Noriko wanted Hikaru to stop her from leaving, some smoke starts trailing in from the lab. When they get there, the DISKs (both heroes and captured villains) are missing and there is a big hole in the wall. Elsewhere, Noriko gives the DISKs to Ōkuma as part of a deal, the DISKs for the removal of her powers. However, Ōkuma lied to her, since he really can't remove her powers. The team tries locating Noriko, but come up empty all across Techno Isle Tokyo. Hikaru decides to search Noriko's home, but finds Wolverine instead with the same goal. Professor X found out that Noriko was captured by Loki's henchmen in a dojo nearby, and the two decide to go after her themselves. Since Thor's DISK is unavailable, Wolverine gives Cyclops' DISK to Hikaru instead. The two X-Men face off against Predator X and Baron Zemo. Predator X manages to paralyze Wolverine's healing factor, and Cyclops is busy dodging sword attacks from Zemo. Chris sees the battle via television broadcast at the airport. Introducing characters: Predator X
20	"In Trouble! Wolverine! / Wolverine in Danger"; Transliteration: "Ayaushi! Uruvarin" (Japanese: 危うし!ウルヴァリン)	Seo Hye-jin	Fumi Tsubota	Takao Kato; Toshiaki Komura	Tatsuya Oka; Shun'ryō Yamamura; Shū'ichirō Manabe	August 13, 2014
With Wolverine paralyzed by Predator X and Cyclops overwhelmed by Baron Zemo, the battle does not bode well. Despite Wolverine's adamantium skeleton being too difficult to pick up, Hikaru attempts to carry Wolverine off to safety. Hikaru's determination to save Noriko and prove useful keeps him going, but the tide of the battle turns hopeless once Cyclops runs out of time and automatically returns to his DISK. Ōkuma approaches Hikaru with a tied-up Noriko and demands the DISKs of not only Cyclops, but also Captain America. Akira, Jessica, and Ed arrive on the scene, and Ed starts praising Zemo to buy some time for Chris to arrive. At an airport security line, Chris finds the DISK for Captain America in his pocket, forcing him to stay in Japan. During Ed's last-ditch attempt to get Chris to stay the night before, he had snuck the Captain's DISK into Chris' back pocket. Back by the dojo, Zemo starts to bore of Ed's praise, and Ed runs fresh out of material. Ōkuma asks why any of them would bother to protect mutants like Noriko and Wolverine, saying that they are heartless and untrustworthy monsters. This forces Noriko to respond with an area blast of her bioelectric powers, knocking out Predator X. Noriko doesn't stop her blast, saying that since she's a mutant nothing matters anymore and she should just make everything disappear. However, Hikaru refuses to abandon her, and enters the bioelectric hazard at his own risk to reach out and comfort Noriko. He does so with her, tears in both their eyes, and Noriko's electricity fades away. As Ōkuma is about to D-Secure Noriko herself, Chris arrives and D-Smashes Captain America to deal with Zemo. The two begin to duel, but the Captain lets his anger over Bucky get the better of him and Zemo corners him easily with both his sword and his words, and Zemo knocks away the shield. Chris steps into the fight, tossing the Captain his shield in order to counter-attack. As the Captain starts dominating Zemo, Chris states how he originally saw the Captain as the perfect person, and how he decided to run away from dealing with the Captain's own worries. With a final affirmation of trust, the Captain finally knocks out Zemo. Ōkuma D-Secures Zemo and Predator X, then tries waiting out the time limit for the Captain and take the DISKs as planned, but Wolverine recovers from the toxins and forces Ōkuma to flee. Chris and the Captain decide to stick together and help with each other's issues, and Noriko decides to try and use her powers to free the Captain and Cyclops. After her attempts fail, three X-Men arrive in the Blackbird: Storm, Iceman, and Colossus, as well as the DISK containing Beast. After Beast is attached to Jessica's wristband, he explains how it is possible to use Cerebro and the energy from Ōkuma's teleporter to follow him to Loki. Introducing characters: Colossus, Iceman, Storm
21	"X-Men! To Loki's Castle! / Storming Loki's Fortress"; Transliteration: "Ekkusumen! Roki-jō e" (Japanese: X-MEN!ロキ城へ)	Makoto Sonoda	Toshimitsu Takeuchi	Makoto Sonoda	Yukihiro Kitano; Nao'aki Hōjō; Emi Hirano	August 20, 2014
In Jotunheim, Loki proceeds with his plan to absorb the powers of the DISKs. The X-Men, kids, and Noriko arrive in Jotunheim via the Blackbird thanks to assistance from Beast and are ambushed by three Destroyers. The X-Men easily eliminate the Destroyers, but Loki drains their powers and the Destroyers are replaced with Sentinels. Elsewhere, Professor X reaches out to Magneto and appeals to him to save Noriko and the X-Men. Hikaru and Jessica prepare to D-Smash Cyclops and Beast to deal with the Sentinels, but the X-Men tell them to save their Biocode for later and leave the Sentinels to them. Magneto arrives, subdues the Sentinels, and unsuccessfully attempts to recruit Noriko to help create a new world where mutants are the dominant species. As everyone enters, they are ambushed by MODOK, Graviton, Baron Zemo, Abomination, and Tiger Shark. Noriko and the X-Men minus Wolverine decide to stay and deal with the villains while the rest go on ahead. Wolverine once again runs into Sabretooth and tells the kids to go on all the way without him. Despite his biocode not having fully recharged, Chris manages to D-Smash Captain America, enabling him to retrieve the DISKs. Introducing characters: Magneto
22	"Final Battle! Loki vs. The Heroes! / Showdown with Loki"; Transliteration: "Kessen Roki tai Hīrō tachi" (Japanese: 決戦 ロキ対ヒーロー達)	Kōji Ogawa	Ryū King	Kōji Ogawa	Akira Takahashi	August 27, 2014
With the Avengers assembled for the final battle against Loki, the Celebrity Five flee and Nozomu steps back with the kids. After Iron Man and the Akatsukis give each other their thanks, Thor attempts to have Loki be ashamed of stealing the powers of others. However, Loki fakes Thor out and blasts him point blank. This drives Thor to overcome his constant responsibility to stop his brother's scheming while at the same time caring for him, and instead do it by any means necessary. With one final battle cry, the Avengers charge on Loki. Iron Man dodges Loki's initial blasts and follows him skyward, managing to sucker punch him and knock him down to the ground. Iron Man taunts Loki for only using one attack, but Loki manages to get up and hit him with one of his own repulsor blasts. He then proceeds to attack the Avengers with Diamondback's explosive diamonds, and repel Thor's hammer with Juggernaut's armor. It seemed that despite Captain America destroying the device, Tim managed to finish the device's processes at the last second. Hulk charges at Loki, but Loki repels him by splashing him with Diablo's alchemy, once again turning him against the Avengers. However, Ed once again tries to reach out to Hulk, and once again frees him from the alchemic control through their bonds. Hulk knocks Loki into the wall, who then gets up and uses Whirlwind's powers to create a massive tornado. Loki tries to hide in the tornado to stall for time, but Tony tells him he's broadcasting Loki's cowardly ploys onto the internet, and that comments are flooding in full of trash talk against him. Loki eventually loses his patience and removes the tornado. He then risks his being by absorbing the power of all the DISKs into his body at once, nearly destroying his castle and burying the ongoing duel between Wolverine and Sabretooth in ice. Taking the fight outside, Loki splits into five and faces the Avengers one-on-one. He uses Doctor Strange's powers to match Iron Man's, Baron Zemo's to match Captain America's, and everyone else's abilities against themselves. While outmatched, Nozomu notices that the heroes' time limits are up, and that the Limited Biocodes are evolving beyond predictions. As the time limits themselves run out, Loki freezes the Avengers while they are still converting to energy, and leaves both them and the kids helpless. However, determined to save their partners, the kids manage to activate a synchronization between their biocodes and partners, preventing them from disappearing. Nozomu asks Akira to take off the wristband, worried about the effects transferring his own power to Tony might have, but Akira refuses. The kids transfer their powers to the Avengers, fully restoring them and giving them new power. The Avengers manage to destroy the Loki duplicates and then return to the DISKs automatically, leaving the original Loki to Iron Man. Iron Man and Akira use both their energies to send out an ultimate attack, one Loki intercepts with his own. The clashing energies create a vortex, one that nearly swallows up Nozomu, but Akira catches him. Iron Man wins the duel with Loki, sending him and the DISKs into the vortex. However, Akira's grip begins to weaken. As Iron Man returns to the DISK, Nozomu leaves the fate of his sons in Tony's hands and lets go of Akira. Akira regains his grip, but Nozomu is pulled into the vortex.
23	"A Brand New Red Terror! / The Rise of the Red Skull"; Transliteration: "Aratanaru Akai Kyōfu" (Japanese: 新たなる赤い恐怖)	Miho Hirayama	Ryū King	Yoshitaka Yashima	Yoshitaka Yashima	September 3, 2014
Akira and the other children are still recovering from the effects of synchronizing their Biocodes with the Avengers. Crossbones frees Loki's former henchmen, who are on their way to prison, in order to gain their Biocodes. A possible trip to the hot springs with Sunfire is interrupted by the discovery that Mystique has stolen the Avengers' remaining villain DISKS in exchange for being freed from her DISK. Sunfire tracks her and interrupts Crossbones as he is about to shoot Mystique. He attacks the Red Skull, but is badly injured by him. Red Skull has gained a full Biocode installation for himself and Crossbones from Loki's former henchmen, using the Dimension Sphere, which has the power to make miracles a reality. He D-Smashes the villains to stalemate the Avengers and escape. Introducing characters: Crossbones, Mystique, Red Skull, Sunfire
24	"Guardians of the Galaxy! / The Guardians of the Galaxy"; Transliteration: "Ginga no Gādianzu" (Japanese: 銀河のガーディアンズ)	Gō Koga	Fumi Tsubota	Gō Koga	Yukihiro Kitano	September 10, 2014
An escape pod containing Rocket Raccoon and Groot is stopped by Iron Man and Hulk from crashing in Techno Isle, Tokyo. The pod also contains the Kree Mact, a powerful blue energy device stolen from Ronan the Accuser by the Guardians of the Galaxy. Iron Man reluctantly agrees to board the Helicarrier to study it. Eventually, Rocket and Groot revive, just as the other members of the Guardians arrive to take back the device and their comrades. The Avengers fight with the Guardians, but settle their differences just before a vortex opens and a large creature emerges. Introducing characters: Guardians of the Galaxy (Drax the Destroyer, Gamora, Groot, Rocket Raccoon, Star-Lord), Fin Fang Foom
25	"Together With the Guardians! / The Power of Kree Mocked"; Transliteration: "Gādianzu to tomo ni" (Japanese: ガーディアンズと共に)	Morio Hatano	Fumi Tsubota	Morio Hatano	Osamu Ishikawa; Nao'aki Hōjō; Emi Hirano	September 17, 2014
The large creature is Fin Fang Foom and he toasts the Helicarrier with his flame. A cobbled together beam weapon is built by Iron Man and Rocket Raccoon, using the Kree Mact as its power source. The beam strikes Fin Fang Foom and knocks him out. Hikaru D-Secures him. Ronan soon appears, angry that the Kree Mact was used thus and wanting it returned. Iron Man stalls for time, asking for an hour to vote. Ronan drains power from the Helicarrier, causing it to crash land in the sea, but agrees to give them an hour. The Heroes attack separately, but are swiftly defeated by Ronan's ability to absorb and control energy. They regroup and attack as a team, with help from Hawkeye, draining Ronan briefly. Defeated, he teleports away. Captain America offers for the Guardians to join the Avengers, but they decide not to. They leave the Kree Mact with the Avengers, to Iron Man's delight, and take two smaller decoys with them. Introducing characters: Ronan the Accuser
26	"Protect the Top-Secret Data! / The Disk War Saga"; Transliteration: "Gokuhi dēta o mamorinuke" (Japanese: 極秘データを守り抜け)	Hiroki Shibata	Makoto Koyama; Ryū King; Fumi Tsubota; Toshimitsu Takeuchi	Hiroki Shibata	Kenji Mi'uma	September 24, 2014
Tony and Akira reminisce about their adventures together insofar. Meanwhile, MODOK hacks Tony's data base and steals the data they have collected throughout the series. Note: This episode serves as a partial recap episode.
27	"The Forbidden Hero Appears? / The Deal with Deadpool"; Transliteration: "Kindan no hīrō tōjō?" (Japanese: 禁断のヒーロー登場？)	Hideki Hiroshima	Ryū King	Kimitoshi Chioka	Seizo Toma	October 1, 2014
While out getting chimichangas and money, Deadpool encounters King Cobra at a "villain joint", defeats him and takes Iron Fist's DISK. Later, he shows up at Avengers headquarters, offering the DISK in return for becoming the leader of the Avengers. King Cobra shows up with Cottonmouth and Diamondback of the Serpent Society, wanting the DISK back. Deadpool (with the backing of the Avengers) easily defeats and the kids D-Secure them. The team refuses his request and he leaves, replacing the captured DISKs with joke fakes. Later, Tiger Shark shows up, wanting him to turn on the Avengers. He is refused and is about to attack Deadpool, when the Avengers show up. They had planted a tracker on his uniform when he was in the shower. Tiger Shark is about to attack them all, despite their bluff of using Iron Man's new armor, when Red Skull D-Secures him, having warned him to stay away from the Avengers. Red Skull's voice laments about how "evil never triumphs", before fading away. Deadpool has vanished in the meantime, revealing that he still has Iron Fist's DISK. Introducing characters: Deadpool
28	"The Earth Destruction Stratagem! / The Countdown Begins"; Transliteration: "Chikyū hakai keikaku" (Japanese: 地球破壊計画)	Yasuo Iwamoto	Ryū King	Yasuo Iwamoto	Taeko Oda; Yoshio Mizumura; Takeshi Oda	October 8, 2014
Hawkeye and Falcon lead a mission to save a researcher but when Hawkeye can't make it out he tells Falcon to go without him telling him to take care of the kids at all costs. The Avengers get a message from Red Skull saying that he plans to destroy the world and in the world that is recreated there will be a new law in which good never triumphs. With five bases and five avengers the kids split up. Akira, Iron Man, and Falcon go to the first hideout and take on Whiplash and Crimson Dynamo. Akira senses that Falcon is troubled due to Hawkeye's absence and doesn't allow Falcon to take any unnecessary risks saying that Hawkeye wanted Falcon to be safe just as much as the kids. Akira and Iron Man then take on MODOK, who controls tech disks and sends them on Iron Man. Falcon is able to save Iron Man but gets badly injured. Iron Man then defeats MODOK with his new invention. Due to Falcon's wounds, Akira D-Secures him and makes Falcon his second hero. Introducing characters: Falcon
29	"His Majesty, Black Panther! / King of Wakanda"; Transliteration: "Kokuō Burakkupansā" (Japanese: 国王ブラックパンサー)	Hiroyuki Kakudō	Toshimitsu Takeuchi	Hiroyuki Kakudō	Yoshitaka Yashima; Naoki Tate	October 15, 2014
With the threat of Red Skull's world destruction plan, Jessica and Wasp go to Wakanda to find the second base. Jessica meets Black Panther, who has been overthrown by Tiger Shark who oppresses the people of Wakanda and forces them to be slaves. Jessica and Black Panther come up with a plan to free the slaves and stop the threat at the same time. At first the plan goes sound, but Jessica gets captured by King Cobra and the Serpent Society, leaving Black Panther to fend for himself. Black Panther frees Jessica but then gets D-Secured by Tiger Shark. Jessica D-Smashes Wasp who with Iron Man's invention saves Wakanda. Jessica then takes the D-Secured Black Panther as her second hero. Introducing characters: Black Panther
30	"Chris and the Moment of Truth! / A Warrior's Will"; Transliteration: "Kurisu Ketsudan no toki" (Japanese: クリス 決断の時)	Kōji Ogawa	Ryū King	Kōji Ogawa	Yukihiro Kitano; Naoki Tate	October 22, 2014
Black Widow arrives outside Deadpool's apartment building. In his apartment, Deadpool is trying to sell Iron Fist's DISK to Taskmaster, but the other is uninterested in the offer and hangs up on him. Black Widow then calls on Deadpool at his apartment in order to hire him for a mission. Deadpool accepts the payment - after proposing to her. Meanwhile Chris, Captain America, and their S.H.I.E.L.D. escort arrive at Baron Zemo's base, where the villain is to launch the next part of the Red Skull's plan. The group enters through a supposedly unguarded tunnel, but are surprise attacked by the Green Goblin and several Hydra agents. The S.H.I.E.L.D. agents remain behind to fight the Goblin as Chris is forced to abandon them to continue his mission, much to his dismay. When more Hydra agents corner Chris, Deadpool arrives and saves him. On the surface, Deadpool gives Iron Fist's DISK to Chris, who is still unhappy that he left the S.H.I.E.L.D. agents behind to face the Goblin and Hydra alone. The three then confront Zemo, who reveals he has brought Hawkeye, in a form of special suspended animation, with him to the base. He threatens to kill the S.H.I.E.L.D. agent if Chris D-Smashes Cap. Unable to condemn Hawkeye to the fate of the other S.H.I.E.L.D. agents who brought him to Zemo's base, Chris refuses to D-Smash Cap. Deadpool, unimpressed and angry with Zemo, attacks the villain anyway, receiving grievous injuries his healing factor cannot dissipate quickly because of Zemo's Dimension Sphere-enhanced abilities. When Chris still refuses to D-Smash Cap, Deadpool fires on Hawkeye in order to leave Chris and Cap free to fight. This reveals that the Hawkeye Zemo "brought" to his base was an illusion and, finally free to fight, Chris D-Smashes Cap. After a brief battle, Cap and Chris defeat Zemo and destroy the Gaia Anchor - only for Zemo to set off pre-placed land mines on the island before Chris can D-Secure him. With the island imploding and Deadpool injured, Chris offers to D-Secure him in order to help him heal, but Deadpool flatly refuses the offer. Subsequently, Chris helps him limp back to the rendezvous point, despite Deadpool's objections that he is being a fool. Finding their path blocked, Chris uses his control over his biocode to charge up Iron Fist's DISK long enough for the hero to remove the blockage in the tunnel. On the other side of the obstruction is Chris and Cap's S.H.I.E.L.D. escort, who are revealed to be alive and well. Later, while recovering aboard the Helicarrier, Deadpool's amorous intentions become too much for Black Widow and she throws him off the ship - though he promises the audience that he will return. Introducing characters: Iron Fist
31	"Ed's Solo Infiltration Mission! / Ed's Solo Mission"; Transliteration: "Edo hitori no Sennyū Keikaku" (Japanese: エドひとりの潜入計画)	Takashi Kobayashi	Fumi Tsubota	Takashi Kobayashi	Ju Heung-seok; Sang-jin Lee; Eun-ha Kim	October 29, 2014
Ed, Hulk, and their S.H.I.E.L.D. escort head for the Abomination's base on Ryker's Island and the Raft. Ed is not eager to return to the island, but he faces that fear as he and Hulk split up with their S.H.I.E.L.D. guards to locate Abomination. During his infiltration, Ed receives a call from Pepper, who explains that Chris managed to do a double D-Smash. Ed is surprised as he listens to Pepper explain that the second D-Smashed hero can only remain outside their DISK for a short period of time when the primary hero's DISK time has already run out. Ed takes this into account, then hangs up. Managing to sneak into the base, Ed is spotted by Rosetta Riley, who makes a call. Inside the base, Ed crawls through the air vents, just as he and Jessica did when she received Wasp's DISK. Getting out of the ventilation system, Ed is cornered by the Celebrity Five. Though Hulk asks to be D-Smashed, Ed knows he needs the Hulk to defeat Abomination. Shutting down the Hulk's hologram, Ed tries to fight the CF with a broom - only to learn that they have come to help him defeat the Red Skull, who has enslaved them and made them Hydra agents against their wills. The Five help Ed escape the other Hydra agents before giving him Power Man's DISK. When Ed then runs into a door he cannot open, he takes a chance and D-Smashes Power Man, who warms up to him when he sees that Ed possess Hulk's DISK. Power Man then carries Ed through the base on his back, punching through doors - and Hydra agents - until they reach Abomination and the Gaia Anchor. Power Man engages Abomination, but is no match for his Dimension Sphere enhanced powers. His time limit runs out and he returns to his DISK, leaving Ed to face the Abomination. In the scuffle, Ed dropped the Hulk's Build Up Plate. Abomination holds it and taunts Ed, who admits he is not strong but is still willing to fight. He lures Abomination into touching a live wire, causing the villain to drop the Build Up Plate. Attaching the mechanism to his DISK, Ed D-Smashes Hulk, who uses his Build Up Power to "Smash" both the Abomination and the Gaia Anchor. Ed D-Secures Abomination and the Hulk mentions his partner has gotten stronger, delighting the boy to no end. Introducing characters: Luke Cage
32	"Hikaru, Tainted By Evil / Prisoner of Darkness"; Transliteration: "Aku ni somaru Hikaru" (Japanese: 悪に染まるヒカル)	Seo Hye-jin	Fumi Tsubota	Hiroshi Ishiodori	Tatsuya Oka; Shun'ryō Yamamura; Manabe Shū'ichirō	November 5, 2014
Hikaru, Thor, and their S.H.I.E.L.D. escort discover that the next base is below ground. As they head inside, Hikaru receives a call from Pepper, who assures him that Akira is fine. Before she has a chance to tell Hikaru about Falcon's fate, however, the older Akatsuki brother travels too far under ground and his phone loses the signal. Though Thor tries to assure Hikaru that Akira will be safe with Iron Man, the Thunderer's partner remains worried. In the caves, Hikaru, Thor, and the S.H.I.E.L.D. agents find Graviton protecting the last Anchor. After a brief battle, Hikaru uses the Build Up Plate to increase Thor's power. The two then easily defeat Graviton and destroy the Anchor. Hikaru D-Secures the villain and, when the world doesn't end, the S.H.I.E.L.D. agents cheer in triumph. Back at his base, Red Skull seethes with fury over the Avengers' victory, then realizes that there may be another way he can win. When Hikaru and Thor go to study shards of a smaller Dimension Sphere that was powering the Gaia Anchor they destroyed, Red Skull arrives. The villain knocks out the S.H.I.E.L.D. agents and traps Hikaru in the cavern. He then threatens to injure Hikaru, wondering what the world would think of an Avenger who was unable to protect a child under his care, since Thor has returned to his DISK. Finding the threat does not faze Hikaru, the Skull then threatens to hunt down Akira, which infuriates the boy. Red Skull leaves and Hikaru falls to pieces with fear. In a blind panic, Hikaru looks to the shards of the smaller Dimension Sphere. Realizing what he intends to do, Thor warns Hikaru that the Sphere will corrupt him, but Hikaru shuts down his hologram and puts a shard of the mini-Sphere in his heart. Back on the Helicarrier, the rest of the kids are happily waiting for Hikaru and Thor's return. At that moment, the Red Skull contacts the carrier and shows them Hikaru standing in his base, head bowed, seemingly in danger. Tony, remembering his promise to the brothers' father, orders the team to the Hydra base stat. Once there, the team learns Hikaru has been corrupted by the Dimension Sphere and is under the Skull's control. Skull has Hikaru D-Smash Thor who, on seeing Hikaru's condition, threatens Red Skull. The Red Skull, however, says that he can free Hikaru from the Sphere's power - if Thor fights his fellow Avengers. Remembering his partnership with Hikaru up to this point, Thor prepares to battle the Avengers, while Akira stares in horror at his corrupted older brother.
33	"The Ultimate Strategy of the Red Skull! / Red Skull's Ultimate Plot"; Transliteration: "Akai dokuro no kyūkyoku sakusen" (Japanese: 赤いドクロの究極作戦)	Hideki Hiroshima	Toshimitsu Takeuchi	Yoshitaka Yashima	Osamu Ishikawa	November 12, 2014
Thor agrees to fight the Avengers when Red Skull threatens to use Hikaru to do the job in his place. Tony plans to pretend to fight Thor until they can come up with a more effective counterattack, but Thor will not play along. The fighting becomes more intense as Thor states he cannot let Hikaru kill anyone. Realizing that Thor will continue to protect Hikaru at all costs, the other Avengers vow to protect their young partners as well. The kids look on in horror as the fighting only gets worse. The fight proceeds to wreck the base, scaring the Hydra agents, who learn from Skull that they and the base are no longer needed. Crossbones emphasizes the point by shooting at one Hydra agent, scaring him off. Skull then puts the Dimension Sphere into the base's computers and leaves his control room. He takes Hikaru to the tank bay where the Avengers are fighting and uses him as leverage to order Thor to kill the other Avengers, while the kids beg their teammates and friends to stop the madness. The Red Skull then suggests to Hikaru that he should use his Build Up Plate. Before he can order the boy to do that, however, Crossbones shoots Red Skull in the back. Injured, Red Skull realizes that the man behind the mask is not Crossbones, but Hawkeye, who is revealed to be alive. The man confirms this, then takes off the mask and replaces it with a set of sunglasses. Hawkeye holds up a DISK, which contains the Skull's second-in-command, and states that Crossbones is taking a nap at the moment. Holding the villain at arrow point, Hawkeye tells him to release Hikaru. The Skull smugly admits he cannot - Hikaru is too far gone for anyone to reach. As if to prove the point, Hikaru charges up with Dimension Sphere energy to kill Hawkeye for injuring the Skull. Thor steps in the way of the blast and orders the Avengers let him handle Hikaru since he and Hikaru are partners, this battle is theirs to fight. Hikaru eventually passes out, only to wake up seconds later, his old self once again. Hikaru is horrified by his behavior but Thor tells him not to let it bother him, as they are partners. Skull is shocked and Cap states that the bond between Hikaru and Thor has wrought a miracle. Tony, however, theorizes that Hikaru's biocode's self-repair system likely negated the Sphere's effects. Wasp makes a point of telling him now is not the time for a scientific explanation as the Avengers prepare to take down the Skull. Red Skull laughs at the fact that the team thinks they have already won and reveals a gargantuan Hydra machine, powered by the Dimension Sphere, is under the base. Escaping to the cockpit, he takes control of the monstrosity as the Avengers are forced to flee. Outside the base, the machine is even bigger. The team dodges the first assault at the same time they synchronize with their partners. Having used up most of their time in the base, the Avengers are now synced to the kids and are now on a tight schedule. Iron Man adds that the six heroes will have a hard time handling the Skull on their own when Chris steps up and states that the team is not alone. He and the other kids with second heroes D-Smash Falcon, Black Panther, Iron Fist, and Power Man to help the Avengers. The battle goes quickly. Cap and Iron Fist team up while Wasp and Black Panther work together. Falcon, who is happy to know his S.H.I.E.L.D. partner and mentor is still alive, helps Hawkeye and Iron Man, while Hulk and Power Man trash the machine as well. The second heroes' time runs out and Iron Man and Akira, using Iron Man's Build Up Plate, deliver the decisive blow to Red Skull's machine. Thor delivers the final blow for Hikaru, and Akira D-Secures Red Skull from the wreckage of the Hydra battle machine. Later, the Hydra agents are taken into custody by S.H.I.E.L.D. as the Celebrity Five escape once again. On the way home, Iron Man tells Pepper that the bad guys have been stopped - again - and that, though he would like to start studying the Dimension Sphere immediately, the kids are out cold after their long night on the job.
34	"A New Avenger?"; Transliteration: "Shinjin Abenjāzu?" (Japanese: 新人アベンジャーズ？)	Hiroki Shibata	Takuya Masumoto	Hiroki Shibata	Yoshitaka Yashima	November 19, 2014
Introducing characters: Mandarin, Nova, Hank Pym
35	"The Black Spider-Man! / Spider-Man in Black"; Transliteration: "Kuroi Supaidāman" (Japanese: 黒いスパイダーマン)	Gō Koga	Mitsutaka Hirota	Gō Koga	Akira Takahashi	November 26, 2014
In New York City, Spider-Man has gone through a strange change. He has become extremely violent and vicious in his crime-fighting ways, not caring for the safety of both criminal and civilian alike. The strangest thing about all of this: he is wearing a new black costume. As the Web-Slinger is branded a menace by the media, the children and the Avengers are outraged and confused by the notion. Although Iron Man attributes this to the smear campaign by J. Jonah Jameson, he sends Cap, Thor and Hulk with their partners to New York to investigate, while he and the Wasp stay behind to help Hank Pym. When they reunite with Spider-Man in person they are shocked to learn that the reports are all true; Spider-Man recklessly nearly kills some people, before Captain America intervenes and attempts to calm him down. This fails, and as he is fighting Spider-Man, Cap notices that Spidey's powers have increased. Spider-Man even attempts to harm Ed when he tries to warn Cap of an attack by him. But just before he does actually hurt the child, he stops and mutters to Ed: "Run", before the Black Widow gets Ed to safety. Spider-Man fights the Black Widow, who was sent by Nick Fury to arrest him, eventually managing to web her up. Spider-Man even holds his own against Thor, until Mjolnir accidentally hits the bell of Our Lady of Saints Church, which causes the Web-Slinger to retreat. Black Widow explains that S.H.I.E.L.D. had found an alien life form, a symbiote, that can bond with a host. She claims that there is evidence that Spider-Man stole the alien that now poses as his new "costume", and that she is to stop him by any means necessary. Ed thinks that Spider-Man is not in control of his own actions, and the Avengers agree with him, but Black Widow is forced to fight Spider-Man again after he goes on another rampage.
36	"Weakness of the Venom Symbiote! / Venom's Weakness"; Transliteration: "Kiseitai Venomu no Jakuten" (Japanese: 寄生体ヴェノムの弱点)	Makoto Sonoda	Mitsutaka Hirota	Makoto Sonoda	Yukihiro Kitano	December 3, 2014
37	"The Overly Clever Helper Robot! / Dr. Pym's Assistant"; Transliteration: "Kashiko sugiru Joshu Robotto" (Japanese: 賢すぎる助手ロボット)	Yasuo Iwamoto	Fumi Tsubota	Yasuo Iwamoto	Hide'aki Furusawa; Kosuke Yoshida	December 10, 2014
Introducing characters: Ultron
38	"Sub-Orbital Iron Man! / Iron Man, in Space"; Transliteration: "Taiki Kengai Aianman" (Japanese: 大気圏外アイアンマン)	Miho Hirayama	Ryū King	Kimitoshi Chioka	Akihiro Asanuma	December 17, 2014
39	"The Ultra Gigantic Ultron Army! / Ultron's Mega Army"; Transliteration: "Chō kyodai Urutoron Gundan" (Japanese: 超巨大ウルトロン軍団)	Hiroshi Ishiodori	Ryū King	Seo Hye-jin	Tatsuya Oka; Shun'ryō Yamamura; Shūichirō Manabe	December 24, 2014
40	"Hikaru, Thor and the Mysterious Voice! / Loki Returns"; Transliteration: "Hikaru to Sō to Nazo no Koe" (Japanese: ヒカルとソーと謎の声)	Hideki Hiroshima	Izumi Todo; Ryū King; Toshimitsu Takeuchi; Fumi Tsubota; Takuya Masumoto; Mitsutaka Hirota	Hideki Hiroshima	Nobuyoshi Hoshikawa	January 7, 2015
While Thor and Hikaru reminisce about recent events, worried about any lingering effects from the Dimension Sphere fragment, Loki re-appears to the Celebrity Five through the portal device Tim created, albeit only in holographic form, stating he has a new plan. Note: This episode serves as a partial recap episode.
41	"The 5 Goons Strike Back! / Frenemies"; Transliteration: "Futatabi Ugomeku Go Akutō" (Japanese: ふたたび蠢く5悪党)	Hiroyuki Kakudō	Toshimitsu Takeuchi	Hiroyuki Kakudō	Yoshitaka Yashima	January 14, 2015
42	"Night of the Vampires! / Vampire Night"; Transliteration: "Kyūketsuki darake no Yoru" (Japanese: 吸血鬼だらけの夜)	Koji Ogawa	Takuya Masumoto; Ryū King	Koji Ogawa	Osamu Ishikawa	January 21, 2015
Introducing characters: Baron Blood, Blade
43	"Blade's Heartless Decision! / Blade's Decision"; Transliteration: "Bureido no Hijō na Ketsudan" (Japanese: ブレイドの非情な決断)	Hiroki Shibata	Ryū King	Hiroki Shibata	Yukihiro Kitano	January 28, 2015
Introducing characters: Ronin
44	"Ronin and the Treasure of Darkness! / Dark Treasures"; Transliteration: "Rōnin to Yami no Hihō" (Japanese: ローニンと闇の秘宝)	Morio Hatano	Mitsutaka Hirota	Morio Hatano	Katsunori Enomoto	February 4, 2015
Introducing characters: Blizzard
45	"The Trap to Divide the Heroes! / Ronin's Secret"; Transliteration: "Hīrō bundan no Wana" (Japanese: ヒーロー分断のワナ)	Gō Koga	Fumi Tsubota	Nozomu Shishio	Akihiro Asanuma	February 11, 2015
46	"Doctor Strange"; Transliteration: "Dokutā Sutorenji" (Japanese: ドクター・ストレンジ)	Hye-jin Seo	Toshimitsu Takeuchi	Hiroshi Ishiodori	Tatsuya Oka; Shun'ryō Yamamura; Shū'ichirō Manabe	February 18, 2015
47	"Tony's Waking Warning / Iron Man's Revelation"; Transliteration: "Mezameta Tonī no Keikoku" (Japanese: 目覚めたトニーの警告)	Makoto Sonoda	Fumi Tsubota	Makoto Sonoda	Yoshitaka Yashima	February 25, 2015
Introducing characters: Dormammu
48	"At Long Last, the Gate to Darkness Opens! / The Dark Gate Opens"; Transliteration: "Tsui ni hirakareru Yami no Tobira" (Japanese: 遂に開かれる闇の扉)	Hiroyuki Kakudō	Mitsutaka Hirota	Hideki Hiroshima	Yukihiro Kitano	March 4, 2015
49	"Complete Release from the DISKs! / Liberation at Last"; Transliteration: "Disuku kara Kanzen kaihō" (Japanese: ディスクから完全解放)	Yasuo Iwamoto	Ryū King	Yasuo Iwamoto	Atsuko Saitō; Masayao Matsumoto; Kim myong sim	March 11, 2015
50	"The Hero Alliance, On the Verge of Defeat / Dark Dominion"; Transliteration: "Taoreyuku Hīrō Rengō" (Japanese: 倒れゆくヒーロー連合)	Kōji Ogawa	Ryū King	Kōji Ogawa	Naoki Tate	March 18, 2015
51	"Farewell, Heroes of My Heart! / Beyond the Battle"; Transliteration: "Saraba Boku dake no Eiyū-tachi" (Japanese: さらば僕だけの英雄達)	Masato Mikami	Ryū King	Toshiaki Komura	Osamu Ishikawa	March 25, 2015
