= Acts of Vengeance =

Marvel Comics storyline

- Promotional image for the Acts of Vengeance series (Avengers #311 (Dec. 1989) - The Amazing Spider-Man #329 (Feb. 1990)).
- Publisher: Marvel Comics
- Publication date: December 1989 – February 1990
- Genre: Superhero; Crossover
Title(s)
- Alpha Flight #79-80
- The Amazing Spider-Man #326-329
- The Avengers #311-313 Annual 19
- Avengers Spotlight #26-29
- Avengers West Coast #53-55
- Captain America #365-367
- The Mutant Misadventures of Cloak and Dagger (vol. 3) #8-10
- Damage Control (vol. 2) #1-4
- Daredevil #275-276
- Doctor Strange, Sorcerer Supreme #11-13
- Fantastic Four #334-336
- The Incredible Hulk #363-369
- Iron Man #250-252
- Marc Spector: Moon Knight #8-10
- The New Mutants #84-86
- Power Pack #53
- The Punisher (vol. 2) #28-29
- The Punisher War Journal #12-13
- Quasar #5-7
- Silver Surfer #33
- The Spectacular Spider-Man #158-160
- Thor #410-412
- The Uncanny X-Men #256-258
- X-Factor #50
- Web of Spider-Man #59-65
- Wolverine (vol. 2) #19-20
- Marvel Age #81
- Main characters: Avengers; Fantastic Four; Spider-Man; West Coast Avengers; X-Men; Loki; Doctor Doom; Magneto; Kingpin; Wizard; Mandarin; Red Skull
- Acts Of Vengeance Omnibus HC: ISBN 978-0-7851-4464-9

"Acts of Vengeance" is a comic book crossover storyline running through several titles published by Marvel Comics from December 1989 to February 1990.

== Publication history ==
This company-wide fall crossover was centered on the Avengers and Fantastic Four after three consecutive fall crossovers were built around the X-Men and related mutant teams. Promotional materials teased the idea of a wide array of super-villains facing heroes they had never met, or were not part of the heroes' regular rogues gallery.

The core titles of the crossover include Avengers; Avengers Spotlight; Avengers West Coast; Captain America; Iron Man; Quasar; Thor; and Fantastic Four. Major tie-ins included The Amazing Spider-Man among other Spider-Man titles, Uncanny X-Men and the second Damage Control limited series. An epilogue features in Cloak and Dagger; Web of Spider-Man and in an Avengers Annual. A humorous parody with the character the Impossible Man features in the title Silver Surfer.

A thematic sequel, Acts of Evil, was published in 2019, the 30th anniversary of Acts of Vengeance.

== Plot summary ==
A mysterious stranger (the Asgardian god Loki in disguise) coerces a group of master supervillains to join forces in a conspiracy to destroy the superhero team the Avengers. Loki does this to strike back at his adopted brother Thor, and due to his bitterness that he inadvertently caused the formation of the Avengers. The supervillain team consists of Doctor Doom, the Kingpin, Magneto, Mandarin, the Red Skull, and Wizard. Loki also attempts to recruit Apocalypse, Cobra, and the Mad Thinker, but they all decline. Loki also approaches Namor, but he rejects the offer stating he is not a villain anymore.

To assist the master villains, Loki engineers a jailbreak at the Vault. The lesser villains are then directed against heroes (mainly the Avengers and Spider-Man) who have never fought them before, the theory being that the unfamiliarity will act in the villains' favor.

While this does result in some unusual battles, the plan falls apart when the master villains fail to cooperate and instead bicker with each other. An example of this is where Magneto, a mutant and a Jewish Holocaust survivor, attacks the Red Skull, whose Nazi beliefs include a prejudice against mutants, and imprisons him in a buried crypt. The supervillain pawns are defeated by the heroes. A frustrated Loki reveals himself and imprisons the Red Skull, Mandarin and Wizard. Meanwhile, Doctor Doom is revealed to have been using a Doombot, Kingpin makes a timely exit and Magneto is not present. The Avengers track the group and defeat the villains, with Thor forcing Loki to flee back to their home of Asgard.

Loki commits one last act of villainy and fuses three Sentinels to form the robot Tri-Sentinel, so that it can destroy New York City. The Tri-Sentinel is stopped by Spider-Man, who at the time possessed the powers of Captain Universe.

== Cast of characters ==
=== Heroes ===
- Alpha Flight
  - Box
  - Diamond Lil
  - Talisman
  - Vindicator
- Avengers
  - Black Widow
  - Captain America
  - Falcon
  - Firebird
  - Hawkeye
  - Hercules
  - Hellcat
  - Iron Man
  - Mockingbird
  - Moondragon
  - Photon
  - Sersi
  - She-Hulk
  - Thor
  - Wasp
  - Wonder Man
- Clea
- Cloak and Dagger
- Daredevil
- Doctor Strange
- Fantastic Four
  - Mister Fantastic
  - Invisible Woman
  - Human Torch
  - Thing
- Gamma Flight
  - Wild Child
  - Witchfire
- Hulk
- Moon Knight
- New Mutants
  - Rusty Collins
  - Skids
- New Warriors
  - Firestar
  - Justice
  - Namorita
  - Night Thrasher
  - Nova
  - Speedball
- Nick Fury
- Power Pack
  - Alex Power
  - Jack Power
  - Julie Power
  - Katie Power
- Puma
- Punisher
- Quasar
- Silver Surfer
- Spider-Man
- West Coast Avengers
  - Hank Pym
  - Human Torch (android)
  - Scarlet Witch
  - U.S. Agent
  - Vision
- X-Men
  - Jubilee
  - Psylocke
  - Wolverine

=== Prime movers ===
- Loki
- Doctor Doom
- Magneto
- Kingpin
- Wizard
- Mandarin
- Red Skull

=== Villain participants ===
- Absorbing Man
- Angar the Screamer
- Arkon
- Armadillo
- Asp
- Assembly of Evil
  - Hulk Robot
  - Fenris
  - Hydro-Man
  - Jester
  - Rock
- Awesome Android
- Baron Brimstone
- Beetle
- Boomerang
- Brothers Grimm
- Bushwacker
- Cactus
- Chemistro (Calvin Carr)
- Coachwhip
- Constrictor
- Controller
- Crossbones
- Dittomaster
- Dragon Man
- Eel (Edward Lavell)
- Electro
- Enchantress
- Executioner
- Flying Tiger
- Freedom Force
  - Avalanche
  - Blob
  - Pyro
- Gargantua
- Giganto (Deviant Mutate)
- Goliath (Erik Josten)
- Graviton
- Grey Gargoyle
- Grey Hulk
- Griffin
- Hobgoblin (Jason Macendale)
- Hydro-Man
- Juggernaut
- Killer Shrike
- Klaw
- Kristoff Vernard
- Lady Mandarin
- Living Laser
- Llan the Sorcerer
- Mad Dog
- Man-Ape
- Mister Hyde
- Mole Man
- Molten Man
- Namor (mind-controlled by Controller)
- Nekra
- Nitro
- Orka
- Owl
- Plantman
- Quill (Resistants Version)
- Ramrod
- Rattler
- Red Ghost
- Rhino
- Ringer (Keith Kraft)
- Scarecrow
- Scorpion
- Screaming Mimi
- Sebastian Shaw
- Shocker
- Stilt-Man
- Super-Adaptoid
- TESS-One
- Terminus
- Tiger Shark
- Tinkerer
- Titania
- Trapster
- Tricephalous
- Tri-Sentinel
- Typhoid Mary
- U-Foes
  - Ironclad
  - Vapor
  - Vector
  - X-Ray
- U.L.T.I.M.A.T.U.M.
  - Anarchy
  - Flag-Smasher
- Ultron-13
- Vanisher
- Venom
- Voice
- Vulture
- Water Wizard
- Whirlwind
- Wrecking Crew
  - Bulldozer
  - Piledriver
  - Thunderball
  - Wrecker
- Yetrigar

Other villains that Loki tried to get involved as members of the inner circle of major villains (but who turned him down) are Apocalypse, Cobra, and the Mad Thinker.

== Issues and events ==
The following issues are listed in chronological order:

- Thor #410 (one page only) - #411
- The Mutant Misadventures of Cloak & Dagger #8 (one page only)
- Avengers Spotlight #26
- The New Mutants #84 - (two pages only) - #85

The following issues are approximately in reading order:

- Avengers Spotlight #26
- The New Mutants #86
- X-Factor #50 (six pages only)
- Damage Control (vol. 2) #1
- The Avengers #311
- Thor #410
- Captain America #365
- Fantastic Four #334
- The Amazing Spider-Man #326
- The Spectacular Spider-Man #158
- Wolverine (vol. 2) #19-20
- The Mutant Misadventures of Cloak and Dagger (vol. 3) #8-9
- Web of Spider-Man #59
- Power Pack #53
- The Incredible Hulk #363
- Marc Spector: Moon Knight #8-9
- Doctor Strange, Sorcerer Supreme #11-12
- Fantastic Four #335-336
- The Amazing Spider-Man #327
- The Spectacular Spider-Man #159
- Web of Spider-Man #60
- Doctor Strange, Sorcerer Supreme #13
- Marc Spector: Moon Knight #10
- Alpha Flight #79-80
- Daredevil #275-276
- Thor #411-412
- Avengers West Coast #53
- Quasar #5
- Avengers Spotlight #27
- Iron Man #251
- The Amazing Spider-Man #328
- The Spectacular Spider-Man #160
- Web of Spider-Man #61
- Uncanny X-Men #256-257
- The Avengers #312
- The Punisher (vol. 2) #28-29
- The Punisher War Journal #12-13
- Captain America #366
- The Mutant Misadventures of Cloak and Dagger #10
- Iron Man #252
- Avengers West Coast #54
- Quasar #6-7
- Avengers Spotlight #28
- The Avengers #313
- Captain America #367
- Avengers Spotlight #29
- Avengers West Coast #55
- The Uncanny X-Men #258
- The Amazing Spider-Man #329
- The Incredible Hulk #369
- Web of Spider-Man #62-63
- Damage Control (vol. 2) #2-4
- Web of Spider-Man #64-65
- The Avengers Annual #19

Note: Iron Man #250 has the "Acts of Vengeance!" logo on its cover, but has nothing to do with the crossover.

== Collected editions ==
Title	Material collected	Published date	ISBN
Acts of Vengeance Omnibus	Avengers #311-313, Annual #19, Avengers Spotlight #26-29, Avengers West Coast #53-55, Captain America #365-367, Iron Man #251-252, Quasar #5-7, Thor #411-413, Mutant Misadventures of Cloak And Dagger #9, Amazing Spider-Man #326-329, Spectacular Spider-Man #158-160, Web of Spider-Man #59-61	March 2011	978-0785144649
Acts of Vengeance Crossovers Omnibus	Fantastic Four #334-336, Incredible Hulk #363, Punisher #28-29, Punisher War Journal #12-13, Marc Spector: Moon Knight #8-10, Daredevil #275-276, Power Pack #53, Damage Control #1-4, material from Doctor Strange, Sorcerer Supreme #11-13, Web of Spider-Man #64-65, Wolverine #19-20, Alpha Flight #79-80, New Mutants #86, Uncanny X-Men #256-258, material from X-Factor #50	August 2011	978-0785144885
Acts of Vengeance: Avengers	Avengers Spotlight #26-28, Avengers #311-313, Quasar #5-7, Iron Man #251-252, Avengers West Coast #53-55, Mutant Misadventures of Cloak And Dagger #9, material from Captain America #365-367, Thor #411-413, Avengers Annual #19, Avengers Spotlight #29	February 2020	978-1302922733
Acts of Vengeance: Marvel Universe	Fantastic Four #334-336, Incredible Hulk #363, Punisher #28-29, Punisher War Journal #12-13, Marc Spector: Moon Knight #8-10, Daredevil #275-276, Power Pack #53, Damage Control #1-4, material from Doctor Strange, Sorcerer Supreme #11-13	September 2020	978-1302923105
Acts of Vengeance: Spider-Man & the X-Men	Amazing Spider-Man #326-329, Spectacular Spider-Man #158-160, Web of Spider-Man #59-61, 64-65, Wolverine #19-20, Alpha Flight #79-80, New Mutants #86, Uncanny X-Men #256-258, material from X-Factor #50	June 2021	978-1302923112
