= Code: Blue =

Fictional organization in comics

Publication information
- Publisher: Marvel Comics
- First appearance: Mighty Thor #426 (November 1990)
- Created by: Tom DeFalco (Writer); Ron Frenz (Artist)

In-story information
- Member(s): Chief O'Grady; Captain Shelley Conklin; Lt. Marcus Stone; Margarita "Rigger" Ruiz; Mad Dog Rassitano; Daniel "Fireworks" Fielstein; Andrew "Jock" Jackson; Samuel "Mother" Majowski; Aaron Christopher Curzon

Code: Blue is a fictional organization appearing in American comic books published by Marvel Comics. Code: Blue was a New York City police SWAT team that was specially trained and equipped to deal with super-powered criminals.

== Publication history ==
Code: Blue appeared in 1994's Marvel Double Feature...Thunderstrike / Code Blue and were created by Tom DeFalco and Ron Frenz.

== Fictional team history ==
Feeling that conventional police tactics and SWAT teams are ineffective against superhuman criminals, Lieutenant Stone proposes a program to create a specialized unit. Dubbed Code: Blue, the group's first assignment is to take down the Wrecking Crew. Surrounded by police while holding a hostage, Wrecker attempts to find the rock troll Ulik, but his inexperience gave Code: Blue enough time to secure positions around the building and attack. The organized strike enables the officers to free the hostage while slowing the Wrecking Crew down. Eventually, the Wrecker used his crowbar to teleport his allies away leaving Code: Blue to score their first mission as a win.

Code: Blue participates in sending well-meaning doubles of Earth heroes back to their home dimensions. The visitors had been taking a manner of vacation in Code: Blue's reality, at times pretending to be the heroes in question.

During the "Fear Itself" storyline, Code Blue establishes an internet presence as they send out valuable information after a supervillain breakout.

During the "Infinity Countdown" storyline, Code Blue recruits a new member named Chris Powell (also known as Darkhawk).

== Members ==
- Chief O'Grady - Police chief
- Captain Shelley Conklin - Police captain
- Lt. Marcus Stone - Commander
- Margarita "Rigger" Ruiz - Team armorer
- Julius Anthony "Mad Dog" Rassitano - Sharpshooter
- Daniel "Fireworks" Fielstein - Demolitions specialist and expert
- Andrew "Jock" Jackson - Personal combat specialist
- Samuel "Mother" Majowski - Tactical analyst (quadriplegic, uses a wheelchair)
- Warren Curzon - Police detective inspector

== In other media ==
Code: Blue appears in the Fantastic Four: World's Greatest Heroes episode "Strings". This version of the group utilize weaponry and armor created by Mister Fantastic, who intended for Code: Blue to act as a backup for the Fantastic Four in case of emergencies.
