= Doctor Strange (disambiguation) =

Doctor Strange is a Marvel Comics superhero.

Doctor Strange or Dr. Strange may also refer to:

== Film and television ==
- Dr. Strange (1978 film), a 1978 made-for-TV movie, based on the Marvel character
- "Doctor Strange", a 1995 episode of Spider-Man: The Animated Series, "Chapter I" of The Sins of the Fathers
- Doctor Strange: The Sorcerer Supreme, a 2007 animated film
- "Doctor Strange", a 2015 episode of Marvel Disk Wars: The Avengers
- Doctor Strange (Marvel Cinematic Universe character), as portrayed since 2016
  - Doctor Strange (2016 film) from Marvel Studios
  - Doctor Strange in the Multiverse of Madness, 2022 film from Marvel Studios
- "Doctor Strange" (Marvel Studios: Legends), an episode of Marvel Studios: Legends

== Comics ==
- Doctor Strange (comic book), the various comics featuring Doctor Strange
- Doc Strange, a Nedor Comics character named Doctor Thomas Hugo Strange
- Hugo Strange, a DC Comics character and recurring Batman villain

== Music ==
- Doctor Strange (soundtrack), the film score for the 2016 film
- Dr. Strange Records, a record label and record store located in Alta Loma, California
- Dr. Strangely Strange, an experimental Irish folk group, formed in Dublin in 1967

== See also ==
- Doctor Stranger, a 2014 South Korean television series
- Dr. Strangelove, a 1964 film directed by Stanley Kubrick
