= Bulldozer (character) =

Name of two fictional Marvel characters

- Bulldozer

Publication information
- Publisher: Marvel Comics
- First appearance: The Defenders #17 (Nov. 1974)
- Created by: Len Wein; Sal Buscema

In-story information
- Alter ego: Henry Camp
- Species: Human mutate
- Place of origin: Earth
- Team affiliations: United States Army; Wrecking Crew; Masters of Evil; Lethal Legion
- Abilities: Superhuman strength, durability and endurance Wears a specially-made armored helmet, neck and shoulder apparatus

Bulldozer (Henry Camp) is a supervillain appearing in American comic books published by Marvel Comics. His daughter, Marci Camp, also takes up the mantle.

The character made his live-action debut in the Marvel Cinematic Universe television series She-Hulk: Attorney at Law.

== Publication history ==
Henry Camp first appeared in The Defenders #17 (November 1974) and was created by Len Wein and Sal Buscema.

Marci Camp first appeared in Fantastic Four (vol. 5) #3-4, and was created by James Robinson and Leonard Kirk.

== Fictional character biography ==
=== Henry Camp ===
Henry Camp was born in Topeka, Kansas. He was a Master Sergeant in the United States Army before being dishonorably discharged. Soon after, he entered a life of crime and was later caught and sent to Ryker's Island Prison. He then became cellmates with Dirk Garthwaite, also known as the Wrecker.

Garthwaite, together with Camp and two other inmates at Ryker's Island Prison, Dr. Eliot Franklin and Brian Phillip Calusky, made a successful jailbreak and managed to locate his enchanted crowbar. Willing to share his power with his allies, The Wrecker had the three other convicts join him in holding onto the crowbar outside during an electrical storm. Lightning struck the crowbar, magically distributing the enchanted strength bestowed upon the Wrecker among the four of them. The Wrecker's three allies then adopted costumes and aliases as well: Franklin became Thunderball, Calusky became Piledriver, and Henry Camp became Bulldozer, constructing a special metal helmet for the occasion. Together, the four superhumanly strong criminals became known as the Wrecking Crew, who were led by the Wrecker himself. The Wrecking Crew broke out of prison and battled the Defenders while attempting to locate a gamma bomb.

With the Wrecking Crew, Bulldozer next battled Captain America and Iron Fist while trying to lure Thor into battle. The Wrecking Crew then did battle Thor. The Wrecking Crew were among the various criminals taken to the Beyonder's Battleworld, including a number of super-powered criminals and superheroes. Bulldozer got the opportunity to face off against the Avengers, X-Men, Fantastic Four, and other superheroes. However, he and the rest of the Crew were soundly outmatched by the She-Hulk on one occasion. The Wrecking Crew next battled Spider-Man and Spider-Woman II. Along with the Wrecking Crew, Bulldozer next joined the fourth Masters of Evil, which attacked and took over Avengers Mansion. Bulldozer helped defeat the god Hercules in combat, but was drained of his superhuman powers by Thor. He was freed from prison by the Wrecker, but without his superhuman powers he was defeated by Spider-Man and Spider-Woman. With the Wrecking Crew, Camp freed the Wrecker and Ulik from prison. He regained his powers, and battled Hercules, Thor, Excalibur, Code: Blue, and the Ghost Rider. His powers were then again drained by Loki.

One of Bulldozer's more recent defeats came at the hands of the group known as the Runaways. This was during a rare bank job in Los Angeles, usually avoided by all supervillains as the Pride controlled that area for a time.

Unlike Thunderball, Bulldozer has remained steadfast in his loyalty to the Wrecker and has only been separated from the Wrecking Crew through various incarcerations in prison.

The Hood has hired him as part of his criminal organization to take advantage of the split in the superhero community caused by the Superhuman Registration Act. He helps them fight the New Avengers but is taken down by Doctor Strange. Bulldozer later helps the Hood in fighting against the Skrulls. He joins with the Hood's gang in an attack on the New Avengers, who were expecting the Dark Avengers instead.

Bulldozer was mentioned to have died from an unknown cause and his daughter Marci becomes the second Bulldozer.

During the Avengers: Standoff! storyline, Bulldozer turned up alive as one of the inmates of Pleasant Hill, a gated community established by S.H.I.E.L.D.

During the "Search for Tony Stark" story arc, Bulldozer and the Wrecking Crew rejoin Hood's gang as they attack Castle Doom. Bulldozer is defeated by Doctor Doom in his Iron Man armor.

=== Marci Camp ===
Marci Camp is the daughter of Henry Camp. After her father had supposedly died from an unknown cause, Marci became the second Bulldozer. As Bulldozer, Marci joins up with the Wizard's Frightful Four, where they attacked the Fantastic Four at Times Square under the orders of a mysterious benefactor. Marci and the rest of the Frightful Four are defeated by the Fantastic Four and arrested by S.H.I.E.L.D.

== Powers and abilities ==
Due to exposure from the Asgardian magic in the Wrecker's crowbar, Henry Camp possesses superhuman strength and a high degree of imperviousness to harm. He can withstand high amounts of concussive force, and is virtually bulletproof. Bulldozer's power augmented his entire body, strengthening his bone, muscle, and flesh. Because of his particular talent (head-butting and ramming), he has greater strength in his neck, shoulders, and legs than the other members of the Wrecking Crew, with the exception of the Wrecker. His superhuman abilities are currently four times greater than when he originally shared the Wrecker's power, making him somewhat stronger than an average well-trained Asgardian god. Bulldozer has a specially-made armored helmet, neck and shoulder apparatus that gives him added protection and invulnerability when ramming an opponent. The helmet partially affects his peripheral field-of-vision. He appears to have used several different versions of the helmet, varying from a simple skullcap to something akin to the Juggernaut's helmet. Bulldozer has basic U.S. Army training in hand-to-hand combat, though now he usually relies on butting with his helmeted head.

Marci Camp has the same powers as her father, but not at the same level as him.

== Other versions ==
=== House of M: Masters of Evil ===
Bulldozer (along with the rest of the Wrecking Crew) appear as members of Hood's Masters of Evil. He is absorbed into Scramble's body when the Masters of Evil invade the Central American country of Santo Rico.

=== Ultimate Marvel ===
Bulldozer works for some time as a law-abiding employee of the restoration firm called Damage Control. After the Wrecking Crew gain their powers, they take over the Flatiron Building and take hostages. Power Princess defeats the Crew.

== In other media ==
=== Television ===
- The Henry Camp incarnation of Bulldozer appears in The Super Hero Squad Show episode "To Err is Superhuman!", voiced by Roger Rose.
- The Henry Camp incarnation of Bulldozer appears in The Avengers: Earth's Mightiest Heroes, voiced by James C. Mathis III.
- The Henry Camp incarnation of Bulldozer appears in the Ultimate Spider-Man episode "Damage", voiced by Kevin Michael Richardson.
- The Henry Camp incarnation of Bulldozer appears in Avengers Assemble, voiced by Travis Willingham.
- The Henry Camp incarnation of Bulldozer appears in Hulk and the Agents of S.M.A.S.H., voiced by Benjamin Diskin.
- The Henry Camp incarnation of Bulldozer appears in Marvel Disk Wars: The Avengers, voiced by Toshitsugu Takashina in the Japanese version and Dave Wittenberg in the English version.
- The Henry Camp incarnation of Bulldozer appears in the She-Hulk: Attorney at Law episode "The People vs. Emil Blonsky", portrayed by an uncredited actor. This version wields an Asgardian helmet.
- The Henry Camp incarnation of Bulldozer appears in Your Friendly Neighborhood Spider-Man, voiced by Ettore "Big E" Ewen. This version is a member of the 110th Street Gang.

=== Video games ===
- The Henry Camp incarnation of Bulldozer appears as a mini-boss in the Sega Genesis version of Spider-Man.
- The Henry Camp incarnation of Bulldozer appears as a boss in Marvel: Ultimate Alliance, voiced by James Arnold Taylor.
- The Henry Camp incarnation of Bulldozer appears as a boss in Marvel: Avengers Alliance.

=== Merchandise ===
The Henry Camp incarnation of Bulldozer was released in a two-pack with the Thing in the fourth wave of Secret Wars figures from Hasbro's 3.75" Marvel Universe toy line.
