= Thunderball (character) =

Marvel supervillain

- Thunderball.

Publication information
- Publisher: Marvel Comics
- First appearance: The Defenders #17 (Nov. 1974)
- Created by: Len Wein; Sal Buscema

In-story information
- Alter ego: Eliot Franklin
- Species: Human mutate
- Place of origin: Earth
- Team affiliations: Wrecking Crew; Frightful Four; Masters of Evil; Secret Empire; Illuminati; Lethal Legion
- Abilities: Genius-level intellect; Superhuman strength, stamina, and durability; Ball and chain proficiency

Thunderball (Eliot Franklin) is a supervillain appearing in American comic books published by Marvel Comics. He is a frequent enemy of Thor and a reluctant ally of the Wrecker and the Wrecking Crew.

The character made his live-action debut in the Marvel Cinematic Universe television series She-Hulk: Attorney at Law, played by Justin Eaton.

== Publication history ==
Thunderball was created by Len Wein and Sal Buscema and first appeared in The Defenders #17 (November 1974).

Phillip Lamarr Cunningham identifies how black supervillains are often forced to choose between great power and great intellect: "Thunderball, who despite his genius-level intellect relies primarily on his strength, has resorted to utilizing a ball and chain as a weapon, and commits crimes with his band of ruffians, The Wrecking Crew."

== Fictional character biography ==
Eliot Franklin was born in Buffalo, New York. He becomes a brilliant physicist and engineer, inventing a miniature gamma bomb that he provides to Richmond Enterprises. However, Richmond executive J. C. Pennysworth steals the bomb and fires Franklin. Franklin attempts to recover the bomb, but is caught and imprisoned. In prison, he meets Dirk Garthwaite, Henry Camp, and Brian Calusky. Garthwaite's magical crowbar empowers all four men, who form the Wrecking Crew.

As a member of the Wrecking Crew, Thunderball has faced many of Marvel's superheroes, including Thor, Iron Man, the Avengers, and the Hulk. They have also been part of other "supervillain" organizations, but they always stayed together as a team. Thunderball has occasionally operated on his own, working as a scientist for criminal organizations, including the Masters of Evil, the Secret Empire, and the Hood's gang.

== Powers and abilities ==
Thunderball possesses superhuman strength and a high degree of durability thanks to the Asgardian magic imparted by the Wrecker's crowbar. His superhuman abilities are currently four times greater than when he originally shared the Wrecker's power, making him more powerful than an Asgardian god.

Thunderball possesses a virtually indestructible wrecking ball attached to a 4-foot-long (1.2 m) chain, enchanted by Wrecker's crowbar. The wrecking ball, when thrown, can return to Thunderball in a similar fashion as Wrecker's crowbar and Thor's hammer Mjolnir.

Thunderball is an expert in engineering and physics, specializing in gamma radiation. He holds a PhD in physics and is an experienced tactician.

== Other versions ==
=== House of M ===
An alternate universe variant of Thunderball from Earth-58163 appears in House of M as a member of the Hood's Masters of Evil.

=== Ultimate Marvel ===
An alternate universe variant of Thunderball from Earth-1610 appears in the Ultimate Marvel imprint.

== In other media ==
=== Television ===
- Thunderball appears in The Super Hero Squad Show, voiced by Alimi Ballard.
- Thunderball appears in The Avengers: Earth's Mightiest Heroes, voiced by Gary Anthony Williams.
- Thunderball appears in the Ultimate Spider-Man episode "Damage", voiced by Chi McBride.
- Thunderball appears in Avengers Assemble, voiced by Fred Tatasciore.
- Thunderball appears in Hulk and the Agents of S.M.A.S.H. episodes "The Skaar Whisperer" and "The Big Green Mile", voiced by Fred Tatasciore in the former and Jonathan Adams in the latter.
- Thunderball appears in Marvel Disk Wars: The Avengers.
- Thunderball appears in the She-Hulk: Attorney at Law episode "The People vs. Emil Blonsky", portrayed by Justin Eaton. This version wields an Asgardian flail.

=== Video games ===
- Thunderball appears as a collective boss alongside the Wrecking Crew in Marvel: Ultimate Alliance, voiced by Fred Tatasciore.
- Thunderball appears as a boss in Marvel: Avengers Alliance.
