= Piledriver (character) =

Fictional comic book character

Publication information
- Publisher: Marvel Comics
- First appearance: The Defenders #17 (November 1974)
- Created by: Len Wein; Sal Buscema

In-story information
- Alter ego: Brian Philip Calusky
- Species: Human mutate
- Place of origin: Earth
- Team affiliations: Wrecking Crew; Masters of Evil; Frightful Four; Lethal Legion
- Abilities: Superhuman strength, durability and endurance Oversized hands

Piledriver (Brian Philip Calusky) is a supervillain appearing in American comic books published by Marvel Comics. He is a member of the Wrecker's Wrecking Crew.

The character made his live-action debut in the Marvel Cinematic Universe television series She-Hulk: Attorney at Law.

== Publication history ==
Piledriver was created by Len Wein and Sal Buscema, and he made his first appearance in The Defenders #17 (November 1974).

== Fictional character biography ==
Brian Philip Calusky was raised on a farm and eventually became a farmhand. As life on the farm is boring, he decides to commit crimes for excitement, which eventually land him in prison at Ryker's Island. There, he meets Dirk Garthwaite, also known as the Wrecker. The two, along with inmates Eliot Franklin and Henry Camp, successfully break out of jail and find Garthwaite's crowbar. When lightning strikes the crowbar, Garthwaite magically distributes powers among the four, with Calusky gaining superhuman strength and large hands. The Wrecker's three allies then adopt costumes and aliases as well: Franklin becomes Thunderball, Camp becomes Bulldozer, and Calusky becomes Piledriver. Together, they become known as the Wrecking Crew.

With the Wrecking Crew, Piledriver fights Captain America and Iron Fist while trying to lure Thor into battle, who they later fight in a revenge attempt. They are among the various criminals taken to the Beyonder's Battleworld. Piledriver faces off against the Avengers, the Hulk, the X-Men, the Fantastic Four, and other superheroes. Piledriver steals computer discs from Dextron Labs and battles Spider-Man and Spider-Woman. Along with the Wrecking Crew, Piledriver joins the Masters of Evil, which attacks and takes over Avengers Mansion. Piledriver helps defeat the god Hercules in combat, but is drained of his powers by Thor. He is freed from prison by the Wrecker, but is defeated by Spider-Man and Spider-Woman. He later regains his powers and escapes from the Vault.

Piledriver defeats Captain America and encounters Damage Control personnel. With the rest of the Wrecking Crew, Piledriver frees the Wrecker and Ulik from police custody and battles Hercules and Thor. His powers are drained by Loki, but he escapes.

Piledriver discovers that he has a son named Ricky Calusky. The boy lives with his grandparents, but when he discovers who his father is, he runs away and joins the Wrecking Crew as Excavator, utilizing a mystically charged shovel. Excavator and the rest of the Crew are defeated by the Runaways during a bank robbery.

The Hood hires Piledriver as part of his criminal organization to take advantage of the split in the superhero community caused by the Superhuman Registration Act. He helps them fight the New Avengers but is taken down by Doctor Strange.

As part of the Hood's gang, Piledriver combats the invading Skrull force in New York. He joins the Hood's gang in an attack on the New Avengers, who were expecting the Dark Avengers instead.

During the Avengers: Standoff! storyline, Piledriver appears as an inmate of Pleasant Hill, a gated community established by S.H.I.E.L.D.

During the "Search for Tony Stark" story arc, Piledriver and the Wrecking Crew rejoin the Hood's gang as they attack Castle Doom. Piledriver is defeated by Doctor Doom in his Iron Man armor.

== Powers and abilities ==
Due to Asgardian magic, Piledriver possesses superhuman strength and a high degree of imperviousness to harm. He can withstand high amounts of concussive force and is virtually bulletproof. Piledriver's power augments his entire body, strengthening his bone, muscle, and flesh. Because of this, he can withstand the impact of high-caliber bullets. Because of his strength and particular talent, he has oversized hands which are more powerful than the other members of the Wrecking Crew, except for the Wrecker. His superhuman abilities are four times greater than when he originally took some of the Wrecker's power, making him somewhat stronger than an average well-trained Asgardian god.

== Other versions ==
=== House of M: Masters of Evil ===
In House of M, Piledriver and the Wrecking Crew appear as members of the Hood's Masters of Evil.

=== Ultimate Marvel ===
An alternate universe variant of Piledriver from Earth-1610 appears in the Ultimate Marvel imprint. This version is a former employee of Damage Control.

== In other media ==
=== Television ===
- Piledriver appears in The Super Hero Squad Show episode "To Err is Superhuman!", voiced by Travis Willingham.
- Piledriver appears in The Avengers: Earth's Mightiest Heroes, voiced by Nolan North.
- Piledriver appears in the Ultimate Spider-Man episode "Damage", voiced by Cam Clarke.
- Piledriver appears in Avengers Assemble, voiced again by Cam Clarke.
- Piledriver appears in Hulk and the Agents of S.M.A.S.H., voiced by Jonathan Adams.
- Piledriver appears in Marvel Disk Wars: The Avengers.
- Piledriver appears in the She-Hulk: Attorney at Law episode "The People vs. Emil Blonsky", portrayed by an uncredited actor. This version wields a pair of Asgardian gloves.

=== Video games ===
- Piledriver appears as a collective boss alongside the Wrecking Crew in Marvel: Ultimate Alliance, voiced by Michael Gough.
- Piledriver appears as a boss in Marvel: Avengers Alliance.

=== Miscellaneous ===
Piledriver appears in the Marvel Rising motion comic, voiced by John DiMaggio.
