= Wrecking Crew (comics) =

Comic book supervillains

Publication information
- Publisher: Marvel Comics
- First appearance: The Defenders #17 (November 1974)
- Created by: Len Wein; Sal Buscema

In-story information
- Member(s): Bulldozer; Piledriver; Thunderball; Wrecker

The Wrecking Crew is a team of four supervillains—the Wrecker, Bulldozer, Piledriver and Thunderball—appearing in American comic books published by Marvel Comics. While not featured on the cover, the Wrecking Crew's first appearance is in The Defenders #17 (Nov 1974).

The Wrecking Crew has also appeared in animated series and video games.

== Fictional team history ==
The Wrecking Crew are formed when Dirk Garthwaite—the Wrecker—is approached by Eliot Franklin in prison and asked to retrieve a gamma bomb Franklin had designed, with the intent of ransoming New York for millions of dollars. The Wrecker had formerly been a violent criminal who demolished crime scenes with his crowbar, but gained his power when he was mistaken for Loki and given mystical powers by Karnilla the Norn Queen. Garthwaite manages to retrieve his enchanted crowbar. During a lightning storm, Wrecker tells Franklin and fellow prisoners Henry Camp and Brian Calusky to grip the weapon simultaneously. A lightning bolt then strikes the crowbar, increases the Wrecker's power and transforms him and the other three men into the Wrecking Crew. Franklin became Thunderball, Camp became Bulldozer, and Caluski became Piledriver. They promptly escape from prison and, in the course of searching for the gamma bomb, are defeated by the Defenders and Luke Cage.

Throughout their publication history, the Wrecking Crew have followed a very familiar cycle—escape from prison, fight (and subsequently lose to) superheroes, and be returned to prison. The Wrecking Crew have battled various heroes, but their main foe is Thor. When the Wrecking Crew first battle Thor, they are confident that it will be a quick victory. Thor, however, infuriated by the fact that one of Wrecker's offensives has killed an innocent bystander, defeats them all in moments and critically injures Wrecker. Thunderball escapes and, several weeks later, recovers Wrecker's crowbar, going on to form his own gang before being defeated by Spider-Man. The Wrecking Crew participate in the near-fatal beating of Hercules during a siege of Avengers Mansion by the Masters of Evil.

During the Civil War crossover event, the Wrecking Crew is forced to join the Thunderbolts or face additional jail time. The Wrecking Crew later escape to Canada to avoid the Superhuman Registration Act. There, they kill everyone inside a bar because of an "annoying" cell phone ringtone. The Wrecking Crew then join forces with the Great Beasts and battle Omega Flight. After being defeated by Omega Flight, the Wrecking Crew are imprisoned in a jail in Manitoba, but manage to escape and return to the United States, where they join the Hood's crime syndicate.

After Bulldozer died of an unknown cause, his daughter Marci became the second Bulldozer. During the Avengers: Standoff! storyline, Wrecker, Piledriver, and a resurrected Bulldozer appear as inmates of Pleasant Hill, a gated community established by S.H.I.E.L.D. The Wrecking Crew later joined Baron Zemo's Masters of Evil.

== Membership ==
=== Current members ===
- Wrecker (Dirk Garthwaite) — The team's leader wields an indestructible crowbar with magical properties. He both hates and fears Thor.
- Bulldozer (Henry Camp) — Bulldozer has an armored metal helmet and fights by ramming head-first.
- Piledriver (Brian Philip Calusky) — Piledriver fights with his oversized pile-driving fists.
- Thunderball (Dr. Eliot Franklin) — Thunderball is the thinker of the team and wields a huge demolition ball on a chain.

=== Former members ===
- Excavator (Ricky Calusky) — The teenage son of Piledriver and a temporary member. The Excavator wielded an enchanted shovel, which was broken in his very first battle when he smashed it over Molly Hayes' head.
- Bulldozer (Marci Camp) — The daughter of Henry Camp, the original Bulldozer, who inherited the villain's powers as well as his training. She now works alongside her father.
- Demolisher (Laura Lopez) - A female mercenary who filled in for Thunderball as a member of the Wrecking Crew when they were working on a job for Mayor Wilson Fisk.

== Reception ==
- In 2022, Screen Rant included the Wrecking Crew in their "10 Most Powerful Hercules Villains In Marvel Comics" list.

== Other versions ==
- An alternate universe iteration of the Wrecking Crew appear in Marvel Zombies vs. The Army of Darkness.
- An alternate universe iteration of the Wrecking Crew from Earth-1610 appears in Ultimate Spider-Man. These versions are former employees of Damage Control.

== In other media ==
=== Television ===
- The Wrecking Crew appear in The Super Hero Squad Show episode "To Err is Superhuman!", with Wrecker, Bulldozer, Piledriver, and Thunderball voiced by Charlie Adler, Roger Rose, Travis Willingham, and Alimi Ballard respectively. This version of the group are members of Doctor Doom's Lethal Legion.
- The Wrecking Crew appear in The Avengers: Earth's Mightiest Heroes, with Wrecker, Bulldozer, Piledriver, and Thunderball voiced by JB Blanc, James C. Mathis III, Nolan North, and Gary Anthony Williams respectively.
- The Wrecking Crew appear in the Ultimate Spider-Man episode "Damage", with Wrecker, Bulldozer, Piledriver, and Thunderball voiced by John DiMaggio, Kevin Michael Richardson, Cam Clarke, and Chi McBride respectively.
- The Wrecking Crew appear in Avengers Assemble, with Wrecker, Bulldozer, Piledriver, and Thunderball voiced by John DiMaggio, Travis Willingham, Cam Clarke, and Fred Tatasciore.
- The Wrecking Crew appear in Hulk and the Agents of S.M.A.S.H., with Wrecker voiced by Steve Blum in "The Skaar Whisperer" and Fred Tatasciore in "The Big Green Mile", Bulldozer by Benjamin Diskin, Piledriver by Jonathan Adams, and Thunderball by Fred Tatasciore in "The Skaar Whisperer" and Jonathan Adams in "The Big Green Mile".
- The Wrecking Crew appear in the Marvel Disk Wars: The Avengers episode "Mutant Girl Awakening".
- The Wrecking Crew appear in the She-Hulk: Attorney at Law episode "The People vs. Emil Blonsky", with the Wrecker and Thunderball portrayed by Nick Gomez and Justin Eaton respectively while Piledriver and Bulldozer are portrayed by uncredited actors. This version of the group are associates of Intelligencia who wield Asgardian construction equipment.

=== Video games ===
- The Wrecking Crew appear as a collective boss in Marvel: Ultimate Alliance, with Wrecker voiced by Dave Wittenberg, Bulldozer by James Arnold Taylor, Piledriver by Michael Gough, and Thunderball by Fred Tatasciore. This version of the group are members of Doctor Doom's Masters of Evil.
- The Wrecking Crew appear as a collective boss in Marvel: Avengers Alliance.

=== Miscellaneous ===
The Wrecking Crew appear in the Marvel Rising motion comic, with Wrecker voiced by J. P. Karliak and Bulldozer and Piledriver by John DiMaggio.

== See also ==
- Demolition Team - A similar themed group from DC Comics.
