= Wrecker (comics) =

Fictional Marvel Comics character

The Wrecker
- Interior artwork from The Mighty Thor #418 (June 1990). Art by Ron Frenz.

Publication information
- Publisher: Marvel Comics
- First appearance: The Mighty Thor #148 (January 1968)
- Created by: Stan Lee; Jack Kirby

In-story information
- Alter ego: Dirk Garthwaite
- Species: Human (empowered)
- Place of origin: Earth
- Team affiliations: Wrecking Crew; Masters of Evil; Legion Accursed; Frightful Four; Lethal Legion
- Abilities: Superhuman strength, stamina and durability Via enchanted crowbar: Energy absorption and projection Force field generation Illusion casting Mind control Teleportation; Ability to create minor earthquakes

The Wrecker (Dirk Garthwaite) is a supervillain appearing in American comic books published by Marvel Comics.

The character made his live-action debut in the Marvel Cinematic Universe television series She-Hulk: Attorney at Law, portrayed by Nick Gomez.

== Publication history ==
Created by Stan Lee and Jack Kirby, the Wrecker made his first appearance in The Mighty Thor #148 (January 1968).

== Fictional character biography ==
Dirk Garthwaite, a.k.a. the Wrecker, first appeared in Thor, and is depicted as a former manual laborer for a demolitions crew who is fired for his violent and anti-social tendencies. Garthwaite created a costume for himself and called himself the Wrecker, committing a series of robberies, demolishing looted locations and leaving a crowbar at the scene of the crime. The Wrecker entered a hotel room occupied by Asgardian god Loki, the adopted brother and archenemy of the Thunder God Thor. Upon knocking out the de-powered Loki, the Wrecker put on his helmet and received an enchantment from Loki's ally, Karnilla the Norn Queen, who assumed he was Loki because the Wrecker was wearing his helmet and she only saw him from the back. Therefore, Karnilla was the source of his newfound enchanted powers. Reveling in his power, the Wrecker embarked on a crime spree and defeated Thor who, at the time, had had his power severely reduced by his father Odin (ruler of the Norse gods) as punishment for choosing to remain on Earth. A building collapsed onto the Thunder God, nearly killing him. The Wrecker was defeated by the Asgardian goddess Sif, who animated the armor of the Asgardian Destroyer to save Thor. The Wrecker's crowbar was shattered.

The Wrecker returned and battled Thor again, although a fully restored Thor easily defeated him.

The Wrecker returned in The Defenders, and this time appeared with three superpowered partners in crime: Bulldozer, Piledriver and Thunderball. Empowered when holding the crowbar as it is struck by lightning, the villains joined the Wrecker to become the Wrecking Crew. While searching for a gamma bomb built by Thunderball with which they hope to extort New York City, the Wrecking Crew battled several members of the Defenders: Doctor Strange; Nighthawk and the Hulk. Aided by Power Man, the heroes defeated the villains.

After an appearance in Fantastic Four as the pawns of the Puppet Master, the Wrecker and the rest of the Wrecking Crew were featured in Iron Fist in a battle against Iron Fist and Captain America. The Wrecking Crew reappeared in Thor against the Thunder God, but were quickly defeated.

The Wrecker appeared with the rest of the Wrecking Crew and other villains in the limited series Secret Wars; battled Spider-Man and teammate Thunderball over control of the Norn power in the title Spectacular Spider-Man; and joined the fourth incarnation of the Masters of Evil in a raid on Avengers Mansion. With the rest of the Wrecking Crew and other villains, the Wrecker savagely beat the Avenger Hercules before being captured by the remaining Avengers. The Wrecker was featured in Iron Man during the Acts of Vengeance storyline; and, in Thor, had several battles alongside the rest of the Wrecking Crew against Thor, Hercules, the superhero team Excalibur, and the Ghost Rider before being defeated. The Wrecker also received instruction from another enemy of Thor, the Asgardian Rock Troll Ulik, as to how to utilize the full power of the enchanted crowbar.

After an appearance with other villains in the title Captain America, and with the rest of the Wrecking Crew in Alpha Flight, the Wrecker was featured in Thunderstrike and reunited with the rest of the Wrecking Crew in Journey into Mystery. After an appearance in flashback in the first issue of Thunderbolts, the Wrecker appeared in the second volume of Marvel Team-Up against Spider-Man, Namor; Doctor Strange and Iron Man, then made an appearance in Thunderbolts and, with the rest of the Wrecking Crew, battled the Avengers.

With the rest of the Wrecking Crew, the Wrecker was featured in Thor and battled the Warriors Three, the Thunder God; and had a brief appearance in the title Wolverine and then Avengers, which featured a grueling battle that left a civilian dead. The Wrecker appeared in She-Hulk; in flashback in Avengers Finale and in New Thunderbolts. The character became a perennial foe of the Avengers and was featured in New Avengers and New Avengers: Most Wanted Files; briefly in New Excalibur and, with the rest of the Wrecking Crew, battled the Canadian superhero team Omega Flight.

After an appearance in the second volume of She-Hulk, New Avengers revealed that the Hood has hired a small army of criminals, which included the Wrecker (taking advantage of the division in the superhero community caused by the Superhuman Registration Act) In Daredevil and at the Hood's direction, the Wrecker battled fellow criminals the Enforcers and the New Avengers. The Wrecker and the rest of the Wrecking Crew were featured in a short story in the second volume of Marvel Comics Presents; then in Punisher War Journal; the miniseries 1985 and with the Hood's army in the Secret Invasion storyline battling the alien Skrull force invading New York City.

The Wrecker continued to make appearances across several titles as an employee of the Hood, including New Avengers; Captain America; the miniseries Marvel Apes and a promotional comic book produced by Taco Bell. Together with the Wrecking Crew, the Wrecker was featured in What If?; Dark Reign Files; in flashback in Incredible Hercules and stories that formed part of the Dark Reign storyline. He was seen among the Hood's men in the attack on Asgard.

During the Avengers: Standoff! storyline, the Wrecker was an inmate of Pleasant Hill, a gated community established by S.H.I.E.L.D.

The Wrecker was then seen among a group of supervillains who heard from the Wizard that Doctor Doom had gone straight, only for Doom to arrive and defeat them single-handed. The Wrecker is later seen in S.H.I.E.L.D. custody, where he is interrogated by the Thing.

The Wrecker and the rest of the Wrecking Crew were seen as members of the Hood's gang as the Wrecking Crew led the attack on Castle Doom. The Wrecker and Thunderball were taken down by Doctor Doom in his Iron Man armor until the Hood showed up with the rest of his gang and shot him with one of his enchanted bullets. As Rampage and Shockwave held him down, the Wrecker was ordered to rip open Doctor Doom's Iron Man armor. As the Wrecker prepared to do the final opening move, Victor von Doom disappeared in a bright light, leaving the armor behind.

During the Blood Hunt event, the Wrecker played an integral part in turning the tide against the invading vampire forces. He was recruited by a deceased Moon Knight's Midnight Mission allies Tigra and Hunter's Moon to help free Khonshu, who had been imprisoned on Asgard. Using his Asgardian powered crowbar, the Wrecker was able to break Khonshu out of his cell, leading to a strong moonlight appearing over a previously darkened Earth, and a resurrected Moon Knight (who could not be brought back to life during Khonshu's imprisonment) leading an army of spirits of previous Fists of Khonshu.

== Powers and abilities ==
Courtesy of an Asgardian enchantment placed on him by mistake by Karnilla the Norn Queen, the Wrecker possesses superhuman strength, stamina and durability (bulletproof). When he initially shares the Norn power with the rest of the Wrecking Crew, the Wrecker's abilities were reduced by one-fourth. After receiving training from Ulik the Rock Troll, the Wrecker no longer suffers from this handicap and is now capable of using his powers to their full potential and use the crowbar in the same fashion that Thor can utilize his mystic hammer Mjolnir. He has used the crowbar to demolish entire buildings in minutes and to hold off the Thunder God Thor in battle. The Wrecker primarily uses the crowbar offensively as both a throwing and blunt weapon. While the Wrecker is the true source of the power, at times the power can be transferred into the crowbar.

The crowbar's secondary abilities include absorbing and projecting energy, creating illusions, generating a force field, creating minor earthquakes, teleportation and returning to the Wrecker when thrown. The Wrecker also shares a mental link with the crowbar and can mentally control any weak-minded individual who touches it. The Wrecker was also able to temporarily mystically impart superhuman strength to the individual and surround them in an impenetrable force field around that person that would protect that person until the individual reached the Wrecker. The individual would be in a trance-like state while they were holding the crowbar and under the Wrecker's control. The trance would be broken once the crowbar was in the Wrecker's possession and the person would have no memory of their experience with the crowbar. The Wrecker is the most powerful member of the Wrecking Crew and while many believe his crowbar is the source of their powers (Thunderball thought that when he attempted to steal the crowbar, until his hand was crushed by the Wrecker in a "friendly" hand-shake while the crowbar was in Thunderball's possession), it is the Wrecker himself that is the source of the Wrecking Crew's powers, especially after Ulik's training.

== Other characters named the Wrecker ==
- A man named Karl Kort went by the name the Wrecker in The Fantastic Four #12 (March 1963).
- A supervillain known as the Wrecker fought Giant-Man and the Wasp in Tales to Astonish #63 (January 1965). He was a two-bit shake-down artist who wore a hood and used DDT and bear traps for weapons. Even at the time, Stan Lee knew this villain was not up to par: "Can we confess something to you? We feel 'The Wrecker' was kind of a weak Giant-Man tale!"

== Other versions ==
=== Marvel Apes ===
The simian version of the Wrecker and his mystical monkey-wrench were vital to the defense of his home dimension from flesh-hungry zombies. While the Wrecker himself fell to the zombies early on, his weapon was used by trans-dimensional travelers interested in saving innocent lives.

=== House of M: Masters of Evil ===
The Wrecker (along with the rest of the Wrecking Crew) appears as a member of the Hood's Masters of Evil.

=== Ultimate Marvel ===
This version of the Wrecker first appeared in the Ultimate Marvel imprint title Ultimate Spider-Man as a member of Damage Control, before he became villainous.

== In other media ==
=== Television ===
- The Wrecker appears in The Super Hero Squad Show episode "To Err is Superhuman!", voiced by Charlie Adler.
- The Wrecker appears in The Avengers: Earth's Mightiest Heroes, voiced by JB Blanc.
- The Wrecker appears in the Ultimate Spider-Man episode "Damage", voiced by John DiMaggio.
- The Wrecker appears in Avengers Assemble, voiced again by John DiMaggio.
- The Wrecker appears in the Hulk and the Agents of S.M.A.S.H. episodes "The Skaar Whisperer" and "The Big Green Mile", voiced by Steve Blum in the former and by Fred Tatasciore in the latter.
- The Wrecker appears in Marvel Disk Wars: The Avengers, voiced by Takahiro Miyake in Japanese and Robin Atkin Downes in English.
- The Wrecker appears in She-Hulk: Attorney at Law, portrayed by Nick Gomez. This version is initially a member of Intelligencia and leader of the Wrecking Crew. Following a failed attack on Jennifer Walters, he joins Emil Blonsky's retreat, Summer Twilight.

=== Video games ===
- The Wrecker appears as a mini-boss in the Sega Genesis version of Spider-Man. He was originally going to appear in the Super Nintendo Entertainment System version, but was cut for unknown reasons.
- The Wrecker appears as a collective boss with the Wrecking Crew and a solo mini-boss in Spider-Woman's Simulation Disc in Marvel Ultimate Alliance, voiced by Dave Wittenberg.
- The Wrecker appears as a mini-boss in Marvel Avengers Alliance.
