= Marvel Disk Wars: The Avengers =

Japanese superhero anime television series

- The cover for the first DVD volume of Marvel Disk Wars: The Avengers, by character designer Tadayoshi Yamamuro.

ディスク・ウォーズ：アベンジャーズ (Disuku Wōzu: Abenjāzu)
- Anime television series
- Directed by: Toshiaki Komura (Series Director)
- Produced by: Masahiro Sugasawa (TV Tokyo); Satoshi Ochiai; Scott Dolph
- Written by: King Ryū
- Music by: Studio Kitchen
- Studio: Toei Animation
- Licensed by: Marvel Entertainment
- Original network: TXN (TV Tokyo)
- English network: SEA: Disney XD
- Original run: April 2, 2014 – March 25, 2015
- Episodes: 51
- Video game

Marvel Disk Wars: The Avengers - Ultimate Heroes
- Developer: Bandai Namco Games
- Publisher: Bandai Namco Games
- Genre: Action
- Platform: Nintendo 3DS
- Released: November 13, 2014
- Other series
- Marvel Anime; Marvel Future Avengers
- icon

Marvel Disk Wars: The Avengers (Japanese: ディスク・ウォーズ：アベンジャーズ, Hepburn: Disuku Wōzu: Abenjāzu) is a Japanese superhero anime television series produced by Toei Animation and The Walt Disney Company Japan, and is based on the Marvel Comics universe. The series began airing in Japan from April 2, 2014, on TX Network stations. The series was aimed at boys 6–12 and tied in with merchandising produced by Bandai.

== Premise ==
With help from Japan's Dr. Nozomu Akatsuki, Iron Man develops a new device called the Digital Identity Securement Kit, known as DISKs for short, designed to help the cause of stopping and detaining villains. However, whilst presenting the DISK project on the Raft, the villainous Loki appears and uses the very same DISKs to launch a breakout of all the captured villains, trapping Captain America, Iron Man, Hulk, Thor and Wasp inside DISKs as well. Nozomu's sons, Akira and Hikaru, along with three other children, Edward, Chris, and Jessica, come to possess these DISKs and obtain biocodes, allowing them to bring out these superheroes for a short period of time. Teaming up with the Avengers, the group travel across the world to search for DISKs before they fall into the wrong hands.

== Characters ==
=== The Heroes ===
These five children have what is known as a Bio-Code graphed into them, due to their proximity to the Bio-Code Installer when it was destroyed by Loki. Because of this and the security programs installed in the DISKs, the kids are the only ones who can release the heroes in question via a process referred to as "D-Smash". However, because the encoding was corrupted, each hero can only be released for five and a half minutes before being forcibly sent back.

The DISKs are divided into five categories based on the imprisoned hero or villain's abilities: Tech (red), Fight (blue), Energy (purple}, Power (green), and Animal (yellow).

==== Children ====
Akira Akatsuki (アキラ・アカツキ)
Voiced by: Mitsuki Saiga (Japanese); Veronica Taylor (English)
A cheerful, carefree young boy and the main protagonist. The younger son of DISK developer Nozomu Akatsuki, he is hot-blooded and has a strong sense of justice. He and his older brother Hikaru are invited to visit their father's research lab on the Raft for the unveiling of the DISK project when it comes under attack by Loki's forces. Akira possesses the Tech Bio-Code, allowing him to summon red DISK heroes like Iron Man, Falcon, and War Machine.
Hikaru Akatsuki (ヒカル・アカツキ)
Voiced by: Yūichi Iguchi (Japanese); Steve Staley (English)
Akira's older brother, and the more calm and mature of the two. He is a prodigy with a quiet and composed personality. He possesses the Energy Bio-Code, allowing him to summon purple DISK heroes like Thor, Nova, Cyclops, and Doctor Strange.
Chris Taylor (クリス・テイラー, Kurisu Teirā)
Voiced by: Yūsuke Kuwahata (Japanese); Benjamin Diskin (English)
The oldest of the five children. He comes across as a cynical bad boy, but is gentle-hearted and likes to make sweets. He possesses the Fight Bio-Code, allowing him to summon blue DISK heroes like Captain America and Iron Fist. His name appears to be a nod to Chris Evans who plays Captain America in the Marvel Cinematic Universe.
Edward Grant (エドワード・グラント, Edowādo Guranto)
Voiced by: Yayoi Sugaya (Japanese); Tara Sands (English)
The youngest of the five children. He is a sweet, shy, kind and lively boy and good student. A big fan of superheroes, he joined the tour on the Raft in hopes of meeting Captain America, who is his favorite hero. He possesses the Power Bio-Code, allowing him to summon green DISK heroes like Hulk and Power Man. His name appears to be a nod to Edward Norton, who played the Hulk in the 2008 film The Incredible Hulk.
Jessica Shannon (ジェシカ・シャノン, Jeshika Shanon)
Voiced by: Naomi Ōzora (Japanese); Danielle Judovits (English)
A rich girl from France whose parents run a business. She is described as "naive and selfish" and is forthright in speaking her mind, though not with malicious intent. Because of her varied interests, Jessica has many skills she uses to trick the villains. She possesses the Animal Bio-Code, allowing her to summon yellow DISK heroes like Wasp, Black Panther, and Beast.

==== Avengers ====
Tony Stark / Iron Man
Voiced by: Eiji Hanawa (Japanese); Matthew Mercer (English)
A Genius, billionaire, playboy, and philanthropist. He fights using a mechanical suit of armor with flight and various integrated weapons. Stark worked with Dr. Akatsuki on the development of the DISK project, which he was presenting at the Raft when Loki attacked. After being trapped in a DISK, he becomes Akira's partner.
Steve Rogers / Captain America
Voiced by: Kazuhiro Nakaya (Japanese); Roger Craig Smith (English)
A World War II veteran and super-soldier. He fights with his unbreakable Vibranium shield and hand-to-hand combat skills. He always puts duty and the mission above everything else and has a tendency to take things too seriously. After being trapped in a DISK, he becomes Chris's partner.
Thor Odinson / Thor
Voiced by: Yasuyuki Kase (Japanese); Travis Willingham (English)
The Norse God of Thunder and the future king of Asgard. He wields Mjolnir, an indestructible hammer that can control thunderstorms and lightning. After being trapped in a DISK, he becomes Hikaru's partner.
Bruce Banner / Hulk
Voiced by: Kenichirou Matsuda (Japanese); Kyle Hebert (English)
A gamma-irradiated scientist turned monster. He has incomparable physical strength and a body that can withstand intense punishment. After being trapped in a DISK, he becomes Ed's partner.
Janet Van Dyne / Wasp
Voiced by: Kaori Mizuhashi (Japanese); Colleen O'Shaughnessey (English)
The only female member of the Avengers. She is a fashion designer as well as a superhero and uses her small size and superior agility to outwit opponents. After being trapped in a DISK, she becomes Jessica's partner.

=== Allies ===
Virginia "Pepper" Potts
Voiced by: Fumie Mizusawa (Japanese); Ali Hillis (English)
Tony Stark's personal assistant. She visits Japan to formally invite the Akatsuki brothers to the Raft to visit their father. Following Loki's attack, she escapes with the children to one of Stark's safehouses. From there, she becomes head of Stark Industries in Stark's absence and acts as a support team member for the heroes during their missions.
Peter Parker / Spider-Man
Voiced by: Shinji Kawada (Japanese); Robbie Daymond (English)
A wisecracking superhero who gained superpowers after being bitten by a radioactive spider. Parker is a Stark Industries scientist and the assistant of Dr. Akatsuki, developing the DISK technology with him. He is one of the only heroes to escape being sealed in a DISK, and provides the Avengers' DISKs to the heroes to fight back against Loki and his forces. Spider-Man protects New York in the Avengers' absence while occasionally assisting the team when needed.
Stephen Strange / Doctor Strange
Voiced by: Yasunori Matsutani (Japanese); Wally Wingert (ep. 2), Liam O'Brien (ep. 46) (English)
The Sorcerer Supreme.
Danny Rand / Iron Fist
Voiced by: Go Shinnomiya (Japanese); Liam O'Brien (English)
A superhero who possesses the "iron fist" move. He got trapped in a DISK that was claimed by Deadpool.
James Rhodes / War Machine
Voiced by: Hidenori Takahashi (Japanese); Keith Silverstein (English)
An armored superhero who is one of Iron Man's allies.
Clint Barton / Hawkeye
Voiced by: Eiji Takemoto (Japanese); Christopher Corey Smith (English)
An archery superhero.
Wade Wilson / Deadpool
Voiced by: Takehito Koyasu (Japanese); Jason Spisak (English)
A mercenary with a regenerative healing factor.
Sam Wilson / Falcon
Voiced by: Kaito Ishikawa
A falcon-themed superhero.
T'Challa / Black Panther
Voiced by: Mahito Ōba (Japanese); James C. Mathis III (English)
A black panther-themed superhero and ruler of Wakanda.
Natasha Romanova / Black Widow
Voiced by: Mayumi Asano (Japanese); Laura Bailey (English)
A super-spy.
Luke Cage
Voiced by: Ryōkan Koyanagi (Japanese); Catero Colbert (English)
A superhero with unbreakable skin who got trapped in a DISK.

==== Guardians of the Galaxy ====
The Guardians of the Galaxy are a group of outer space superheroes.

Peter Quill / Star-Lord
Voiced by: Go Inoue (Japanese); Mick Wingert (English)
A Human/Spartoi who is the leader of the Guardians of the Galaxy.
Gamora
Voiced by: Junko Kitanishi
A Zen-Whoberian who is a member of the Guardians of the Galaxy.
Drax the Destroyer
Voiced by: Yoshinori Sonobe (Japanese); Patrick Seitz (English)
A human mutate who is a member of the Guardians of the Galaxy.
Rocket Raccoon
Voiced by: Fumihiro Okabayashi (Japanese); Dave Wittenberg (English)
A Halfworlder raccoon who is a member of the Guardians of the Galaxy.
Groot
Voiced by: Masato Funaki (Japanese); John Eric Bentley (English)
A Flora colossus who is a member of the Guardians of the Galaxy.

==== S.H.I.E.L.D. ====
S.H.I.E.L.D. is a government espionage organization.

Nick Fury
Voiced by: Hisao Egawa (Japanese); John Eric Bentley (English)
The Director of S.H.I.E.L.D.
Maria Hill
Voiced by: Akeno Watanabe (Japanese); Kari Wahlgren (English)
A member of S.H.I.E.L.D.

==== X-Men ====
The X-Men are a team of mutant superheroes.

Charles Xavier / Professor X
Voiced by: Osamu Saka (Japanese); Cam Clarke (English)
A telepath who is the leader of the X-Men.
Hank McCoy / Beast
Voiced by: Naomi Kusumi (Japanese); Dave Wittenberg (English)
A blue-furred animalistic member of the X-Men. He got trapped in a DISK.
Piotr Rasputin / Colossus
Voiced by: Takahiro Fujimoto (Japanese); Neil Kaplan (English)
A mutant and member of the X-Men who can turn his skin into organic metal.
Scott Summers / Cyclops
Voiced by: Takahiro Yoshimizu (Japanese); Steve Staley (English)
A member of the X-Men with optic blasts. He got trapped in a DISK that Wolverine claimed.
Bobby Drake / Iceman
Voiced by: Yuka Tai (Japanese); Yuri Lowenthal (English)
A cryokinetic mutant and member of the X-Men.
Ororo Munroe / Storm
Voiced by: Yayoi Saguya (Japanese); Danielle Nicolet (English)
A weather-controlling mutant and member of the X-Men.
Shiro Yoshida / Sunfire
Voiced by: Tomokazu Sugita (Japanese); Yuri Lowenthal (English)
A mutant and member of the X-Men with fiery plasma abilities.
James Howlett / Wolverine
Voiced by: Kenji Nomura (Japanese); Steve Blum (English)
A member of the X-Men with retractable adamantium claws and a healing factor.

=== Villains ===
Loki Laufeyson / Loki
Voiced by: Tadashi Mutou (Japanese); Crispin Freeman (English)
The main antagonist and the adopted brother and archenemy of Thor. He uses the DISKs to free all the prisoners on the Raft, allowing them to escape, while trapping the heroes inside DISKs of their own. In the aftermath of his attack, he disguises himself as Senator Robert Winters and takes over S.H.I.E.L.D. in an attempt to find the DISKs scattered around the globe. He later loses a fight against the Avengers and the X-Men and is trapped in another world with Dr. Akatsuki. Loki eventually escapes and returns to New York, ultimately being captured in a DISK by Akira in the final episode.

==== Celebrity Five ====
The Celebrity Five are a team of five masked human villains working with Loki to retrieve all the missing DISKs and place the world's superheroes and supervillains under their control. The group is led by former S.H.I.E.L.D. agent Tim Gilliam and consists of reporter Rosetta Riley, chef Manino Giordani, musician Joel Murphy, and swordsman Okuma Jubei. Following Loki's defeat, the Celebrity Five are arrested, but are freed and forcibly recruited into Hydra by the Red Skull.

Tim Gilliam
Voiced by: Mitsuaki Madono (Japanese); Johnny Yong Bosch (English)
Rosetta Riley
Voiced by:Sachiko Kojima (Japanese); Kari Wahlgren (English)
Manino Giordani
Voiced by:Tarusuke Shingaki (Japanese); Kyle Hebert (English)
Joel Murphy
Voiced by: Atsushi Imaruoka (Japanese); Benjamin Diskin (English)
Okuma Jubei
Voiced by: Masaya Takatsuka (Japanese); Christopher Corey Smith (English)

==== Masters of Evil ====
The Masters of Evil are a team of supervillains.

Baron Heinrich Zemo
Voiced by: Taketora (Japanese); Robin Atkin Downes (English)
An enemy of Captain America.
Emil Blonsky / Abomination
Voiced by: Masaya Takatsuka (Japanese); Robin Atkin Downes (English)
A gamma-powered enemy of Hulk.
Franklin Hall / Graviton
Voiced by: Mitsuaki Madano (Japanese); Patrick Seitz (English)
A gravity-manipulating supervillain.
MODOK
Voiced by: Atsushi Imaruoka (Japanese); Wally Wingert (English)
A technopathic mad scientist with an enlarged head and stunted body who gets around in a hoverchair.
Todd Arliss / Tiger Shark
A tiger shark-themed supervillain. In this show, he has the ability to manipulate water.

==== Hydra ====
Johann Schmidt / Red Skull
Voiced by: Motomu Kiyokawa (Japanese); Liam O'Brien (English)
The head of the Hydra terrorist group, and the archenemy of Captain America. After the defeat of Loki, Red Skull becomes the second main antagonist of the series, maintaining more control over the DISKs than Loki through the use of the Dimension Sphere.

==== Serpent Society ====
The Serpent Society is a team of snake-themed villains.

Klaus Voorhees / King Cobra
A king cobra-themed supervillain and member of the Serpent Society.
Burchell Clemens / Cottonmouth
A bionically-enhanced cottonmouth-themed supervillain and member of the Serpent Society.
Death Adder
A death adder-themed supervillain and member of the Serpent Society. In this show, Death Adder is an unnamed female.
Rachel Leighton / Diamondback
Voiced by: Naomi Shindō (Japanese); Rachel Robinson (English)
A western diamondback rattlesnake-themed supervillain and member of the Serpent Society.

==== Wrecking Crew ====
A group of four supervillains:

Dirk Garthwaite / Wrecker
Voiced by: Takahiro Miyake (Japanese); Robin Atkin Downes (English)
The leader of the Wrecking Crew who wields an enchanted crowbar.
Henry Camp / Bulldozer
Voiced by: Toshitsugu Takashina (Japanese); Dave Wittenberg (English)
A member of the Wrecking Crew who wields an indestructible helmet.
Brian Calusky / Piledriver
Voiced by: Daisuke Kirii (Japanese); Roger Craig Smith (English)
A member of the Wrecking Crew with large pile-driving fists.
Thunderball / Eliot Franklin
Voiced by: Toshihiro Okuba
A member of the Wrecking Crew who wields a ball and chain.

==== Other villains ====
Carl Creel / Absorbing Man
Voiced by: Yasuhiko Kawazu (Japanese); John Eric Bentley (English)
A supervillain who can take on the properties of anything he touches.
Dmitri Bucharin / Crimson Dynamo
Voiced by: Tetsu Inada (Japanese); Yuri Lowenthal (English)
An armored supervillain from Russia.
Norman Osborn / Green Goblin
Voiced by: Yusuke Numate (Japanese); Kirk Thornton (English)
A goblin-themed supervillain and enemy of Spider-Man.
David Cannon / Whirlwind
Voiced by: Takahiro Miyake (Japanese); Keith Silverstein (English)
A supervillain who can spin very fast.
Curt Connors / Lizard
Voiced by: Yusuke Handa (Japanese); Kirk Thornton (English)
A scientist who became a rampaging lizard supervillain.
Esteban Corazón de Ablo / Diablo
Voiced by: Tomohisa Aso (Japanese); Matthew Mercer (English)
An evil alchemist.
Kenuichio Harada / Silver Samurai
Voiced by: Takanori Nishikawa (Japanese); Andrew Kishino (English)
A mutant samurai who can kinetically charge his sword. In the series, he is depicted as an old enemy of Iron Man.
Cain Marko / Juggernaut
Voiced by: Shota Yamamoto
A powerful supervillain whose helmet protects him from mental attacks.
Otto Octavius / Doctor Octopus
Voiced by: Dai Matsumoto (Japanese); Dave Wittenberg (English)
A supervillain with mechanical tentacles and an enemy of Spider-Man.
Victor Creed / Sabretooth
Voiced by: Takuya Kirimoto (Japanese); Peter Lurie (English)
A mutant supervillain with claws who is a known enemy of Wolverine.
Predator X
Voiced by: Tarusuke Shingaki (Japanese); Steve Blum (English)
An artificially-created mutant-hunting creature.
Max Eisenhart / Magneto
Voiced by: Banjō Ginga (Japanese); Neil Kaplan (English)
A magnetic-manipulating mutant supervillain and enemy of the X-Men.
Brock Rumlow / Crossbones
Voiced by: Masato Obara (Japanese); Fred Tatasciore (English)
A mercenary.
Raven Darkholme / Mystique
Voiced by: Masumi Asano
A shapeshifting mutant.
Ronan the Accuser
Voiced by: Hiroshi Shirokuma (Japanese); James C. Mathis III (English)
A Kree Accuser.
Fin Fang Foom
Voiced by: Kenji Hirai
A dragon-like alien known as a Makluan.

== Production ==
Marvel Disk Wars: The Avengers, produced by Toei Animation, began airing on TV Tokyo from April 2, 2014. The series is helmed by series director Toshiaki Komura, a veteran director for Toei Animation's Precure franchise. Series organization is provided by King Ryū, who has no previous credits in the entertainment industry. Veteran Dragon Ball animator and character designer Tadayoshi Yamamuro provides character designs, much in the same style as Dragon Ball. As of Episode #27 the role of character designer is shared with Naoki Tate due to Yamamuro's directing of Dragon Ball Z: Fukkatsu no F. The opening and ending themes are "Tsuki Yabureru - Time to SMASH!" (突(つ)キ破(やぶ)レル-Time(タイム) to(トゥ) SMASH(スマッシュ)!, Break On Through - Time to SMASH!) and "Thread of Fate" respectively, both performed by T.M.Revolution. An English dub began airing on July 6, 2015, on Disney XD in Southeast Asia, Disney Channel in the Philippines, and both Disney Channel and its programming block Disney XD in Taiwan. It premiered in India in English, Hindi, Tamil & Telugu audios on Marvel HQ on March 16, 2020.

== Reception ==
Jonathon Greenall of Comic Book Resources referred to Marvel Disk Wars: The Avengers as a "fascinating show," writing, "It is a highly unique take on classic Marvel characters that gives them a unique anime twist while retaining the original elements that made them so memorable and loved in the first place. Best of all, it puts them in a story that is totally different from any other Marvel adventure." Rosie Knight of Nerdist called Marvel Disk Wars: The Avengers an "awesome anime" with a "wild take on superhero storytelling," saying, "This is a super fun series that would be a great addition to Disney+ and we want to see it now." Scoot Allan of Screen Rant said, "It's definitely a fun concept with stunning animation, but not one that conveyed the narratives comic book fans might be familiar with. It can still be appreciated though as a unique take."

== In other media ==
=== Video game ===
A video game based on the series, titled Marvel Disk Wars: The Avengers - Ultimate Heroes (ディスクウォーズ：アベンジャーズ アルティメットヒーローズ) was developed and published by Bandai Namco Games and was released in Japan for the Nintendo 3DS on November 13, 2014.

=== Bachicombat ===
Bachicombat is Bandai's collectible game tied in with the TV show. The game is similar to the game Pogs. It is meant to simulate the plot of the show which sees young kids who possess a unique "Biocode" summon heroes and villains trapped inside S.H.I.E.L.D. tech that Loki's turned against the Marvel Universe.

== See also ==
- Marvel Anime
- Marvel Future Avengers
