= The Defenders (comic book) =

Comic book series

- The Defenders #34.

Publication information
- Publisher: Marvel Comics
- Format: Ongoing series
- Genre: Superhero
- Publication date: (Vol. 1): 1972-1986
- No. of issues: (Vol. 1): 152
- Main character: Defenders

The Defenders is a comic book series featuring the team the Defenders and published by Marvel Comics, which debuted in 1972.

== Publication history ==
The Defenders first appeared as a feature in Marvel Feature #1 (December 1971). Due to the popularity of their tryout in Marvel Feature, Marvel soon began publishing The Defenders. Writer Steve Englehart has stated that he added the Valkyrie to the Defenders in issue #4 "to provide some texture to the group." Englehart wrote "The Avengers–Defenders War" crossover in The Avengers #116–118 (October–December 1973) and The Defenders #9–11 (October–December 1973). Len Wein briefly wrote the series, and later became the editor for several issues.

Steve Gerber first worked on the characters in Giant-Size Defenders #3 (January 1975) and became the writer of the main title with issue #20 the following month. He wrote the series until issue #41 (November 1976). In 2010, Comics Bulletin ranked Gerber and Sal Buscema's run on The Defenders first on its list of the "Top 10 1970s Marvels".

David Anthony Kraft's run as writer included "The Scorpio Saga" (issues #46, 48–50) and the "Xenogenesis: Day of the Demons" storyline (issues #58–60). Kraft later recalled that reactions to the off-beat humor in his "Defender for a Day" storyline in issues #62–64 were polarized: "readers were either wildly enthusiastic or absolutely and very utterly appalled."

Steven Grant wrote a conclusion to Steve Gerber's Omega the Unknown series in two issues of The Defenders, at the end of which most of the original series' characters were killed.

Writer J. M. DeMatteis took over the series with issue #92. Coming from a background of writing eight-page horror shorts for DC Comics, DeMatteis found it a struggle to adapt to writing a 22-page superhero comic on a monthly basis. He and Mark Gruenwald co-wrote The Defenders #107–109 (May–July 1982). While working on the series, DeMatteis developed a strong friendship with penciler Don Perlin, who would draw the series for nearly half its run. Perlin later commented, "It turned out to be a real fun book because you got a chance to draw almost every character Marvel had at one time or another." He has also stated that Kim DeMulder, who inked issues #122-144 apart from a few fill-ins, is his preferred inker after himself. .

During his run, Perlin recalled, he became what he has characterized as "the first guy, unwittingly, to put profanity in [Comics Code-approved] comics":

This happened in one [issue] of The Defenders. There was a character in there who was a lawyer for the Defenders and his gimmick was that no matter where you saw him in his office, there had to be a TV set on—he was always watching TV. And while I was drawing one of the panels I was listening to a talk show and there was someone on telling how bad cereals for kids were—they were all loaded with sugar. So I drew a picture on the TV of a bunny rabbit holding a box of cereal and across the label where the name of the cereal would be I pencilled in "shit". So I figured, because I used to write nutty comments in the borders and stuff, I thought they'd get a laugh out of it and change it. So they gave it to [Peru-born inker] Pablo Marcos and I don’t know if he knew how to read English or not but he inked it. I walked in one day [to Marvel] ... and [editor-in-chief Jim] Shooter started yelling, "What did you do? Look at it! They called me upstairs and showed me this," and I said, "Wait a minute. That thing goes through an assistant editor, an editor, a proofreader and then you’re supposed to read it. And no one picked it up so don't blame me." So what happened was he said fine, just don't write anymore comments on your pages.

=== The New Defenders ===
Suffering from creative burnout on the series, DeMatteis felt a change was needed. As of issue #125, The Defenders was retitled to The New Defenders as the original four members (Doctor Strange, the Silver Surfer, the Hulk, and Namor) are forced to leave the team. The "New Defenders" concept provided a substantial boost to the series's sales, but left DeMatteis in a creative drought, as he realized in retrospect that "...I created a book that was exactly the kind of the thing that I hated to write. I made it into a standard superhero team..." DeMatteis stayed on for only six issues of The New Defenders before turning it over to writer Peter Gillis.

The series's final issue was The New Defenders #152. Penciler Don Perlin recounted "[Editor] Carl Potts he took me and Peter Gillis to lunch. We went to an Indian restaurant... He said, ‘They canceled the book.’"

=== Secret Defenders ===
In 1993, Marvel sought to revive the "Defenders" brand as "The Secret Defenders". The new team first appeared, unofficially, in Dr. Strange #50 and later Fantastic Four #374, before being officially introduced in Secret Defenders #1.

=== Reunion and The Order ===
In 2001–2002, The Defenders reunited in The Defenders volume 2 #1–12 created by Kurt Busiek and Erik Larsen, immediately followed by The Order #1–6. A fill-in issue set between these two series was published in 2011.

=== 2005 Mini-series ===
A Defenders five-issue mini-series debuted in July 2005, by Keith Giffen, J. M. DeMatteis, and Kevin Maguire (as a team, best known for their work on DC's Justice League franchise), featuring Doctor Strange attempting to reunite the original four Defenders to battle Dormammu and Umar. This series focuses mostly on humor as the characters spend most of their time arguing with and criticizing one another. The series was later collected into both hardcover and trade paperback collections, entitled Defenders: Indefensible.

=== The Last Defenders ===
In 2008 Joe Casey wrote a new miniseries with a new line-up of Defenders as a result of the Super-Human Registration Act and the events of the Civil War.

=== 2011 series ===
Marvel launched a new Defenders series in December 2011, written by Matt Fraction and drawn by Terry Dodson. The new book features Doctor Strange, Red She-Hulk, Namor, the Silver Surfer and Iron Fist. The new series follows the reunion of the Defenders in Fear Itself: The Deep. The series was cancelled at issue #12.

=== The Fearless Defenders ===
February 2013 saw the debut of The Fearless Defenders, a series written by Cullen Bunn with artwork by Will Sliney. Bunn said that he had wanted to write the series, which centers on a new team of Valkyrior, led by Valkyrie and Misty Knight, after writing Fear Itself: The Fearless. It was suggested to him that it should run as a Defenders title, however Bunn explained that beyond the name there is "little connection" to the Defenders.

=== 2017 series ===
In August 2017, Marvel launched a new Defenders comic book series starring Daredevil, Jessica Jones, Luke Cage and Iron Fist, based on the Netflix incarnation of the team.

=== 2021 series ===
In August 2021, Marvel launched a new Defenders series.

== Contributors ==
=== Vol. 1 (1972–1986) ===
==== Writers ====
Years	Writer	Issues
1972-1973	Steve Englehart	#1–11
1973, 1974-1975	Len Wein	#7, #12-19
1975, 1978	Chris Claremont	#19, #57
1975-1976	Steve Gerber	#20–29, #31–41, Annual #1
1975	Bill Mantlo	#30
1976-1977, 1978	Gerry Conway	#42-45, #57
1977	Roger Slifer	#44-47
1977-1979, 1980	David Anthony Kraft	#44–56, #58–68, #89
1977	John Warner	#47
1977	Don McGregor	#48
1978-1981	Ed Hannigan	#59, #67-68, #70-75, #78-91
1979	Jo Duffy	#69
1979	Jim Shooter	#69
1979, 1980, 1983	Steven Grant	#76-77, #89, #119
1979, 1980, 1982	Mark Gruenwald	#77, #89, #108-109, #111
1981-1984	J. M. DeMatteis	#92-118, #120-131
1982-1983	Don Perlin	#113-114, #121
1984-1986	Peter B. Gillis	#131-152

==== Pencilers ====
Years	Penciler	Issues
1972-1976, 1978, 1983-1985	Sal Buscema	#1–29, #31–41, #62–64, #119, #127, #148, Annual #1
1975	Sam Grainger	#30
1976-1977	Keith Giffen	#42-54
1977	Michael Golden	#53-54
1977-1978	Dave Cockrum	#53, #57
1978	Carmine Infantino	#55-56
1978	George Tuska	#57
1978-1979, 1980	Ed Hannigan	#58-61, #66-67, #79
1978, 1980-1986	Don Perlin	#65, #82-118, #120–125, #129, #132, #134–145, #147, #149–152
1979-1980	Herb Trimpe	#68-81
1983-1984	Alan Kupperberg	#126, #128, #131, #133
1984	Mike Zeck	#130
1985	Luke McDonnell	#146

== Collected editions ==
=== Marvel Masterworks Defenders ===
Title	Material collected	Year	ISBN
Volume 1	Sub-Mariner #34–35, Marvel Feature #1–3, The Defenders #1–6	2008	978-0785130444
Volume 2	The Defenders #7–16, Giant-Size Defenders #1, The Avengers #115–118	2011	978-0785142164
Volume 3	The Defenders #17–21, Giant-Size Defenders #2–4, Marvel Two-In-One #6–7	2012	978-0785159612
Volume 4	The Defenders #22–30, Giant-Size Defenders #5, Marvel Super-Heroes #18	2014	978-0785166276
Volume 5	The Defenders #31–41, The Defenders Annual #1, Marvel Treasury Edition #12	2015	978-0785191827
Volume 6	The Defenders #42-57, material From FOOM #19	2018	978-1302909581
Volume 7	The Defenders #58-75, material From Marvel Treasury Edition #16	2020	978-1302922269
Volume 8	The Defenders #76-91, material from Tales to Astonish #13	2022	978-1302933302
Volume 9	The Defenders #92-102, Marvel Team-Up #101	2024	

=== Defenders Omnibus ===
Title	Material collected	Year	ISBN
Volume 1	Sub-Mariner #34–35, Marvel Feature #1–3, The Defenders #1–19, Giant-Size Defenders #1-2, The Avengers #115–118	2021	978-1302928599
Volume 2	The Defenders #20-41 and Annual #1, Giant-Size Defenders #3-5, Marvel Two-in-One #6-7 and Marvel Treasury Edition #12, plus material from Mystery Tales #21, World of Fantasy #11 and Tales of Suspence #9	2023	978-1302948771

=== Essential Defenders ===
Title	Material collected	Year	ISBN
Volume 1	The Defenders #1–14, Doctor Strange #183, Sub-Mariner #22, 34–35, The Incredible Hulk #126, Marvel Feature #1–3, and The Avengers #115–118	2005	978-0785115472
Volume 2	The Defenders #15–30, Giant-Size Defenders #1–5, Marvel Two-in-One #6–7, Marvel Team-Up #33–35, and Marvel Treasury Edition #12	2006	978-0785121503
Volume 3	The Defenders #31–60 and The Defenders Annual #1	2007	978-0785126966
Volume 4	The Defenders #61–91	2008	978-0785130611
Volume 5	The Defenders #92–106, Marvel Team-Up #101, 111, 116, Captain America #268	2010	978-0785145370
Volume 6	The Defenders #107–124, The New Defenders #125, The Avengers Annual #11, Marvel Team-Up #119	2011	978-0785157540
Volume 7	The New Defenders #126–139, Iceman #1–4, Beauty and the Beast #1–4	2013	978-0785184058

=== Marvel Epic collections ===
Title	Volume	Material collected	Year	ISBN
The Defenders: Day of the Defenders	1	Doctor Strange #183; Sub-Mariner #22, 34-35; Incredible Hulk #126; Marvel Feature #1-3; Defenders #1-11; Avengers #116-118; material from Avengers #115	2022	978-1302933562
Enter: The Headmen	2	Defenders #12-25; Giant-Size Defenders #1-4; Marvel Two-in-One #6-7; material from Mystery Tales #21; World of Fantasy #11; Tales of Suspense #9	2024	978-1302955311
World Gone Sane	3	Defenders #26-41, Annual #1; Giant-Size Defenders #5; Marvel Treasury Edition #12	2025	978-1302960544
The Defenders: The Six Fingered Hand	6	The Defenders #92-109; Marvel Team-Up #101; Captain America #268	2016	978-0785195993
The Defenders: Ashes To Ashes	7	The Defenders #110-125; Avengers Annual #11	2017	978-1302904289
The Defenders: The New Defenders	8	The Defenders #126–137; Iceman #1–4; Beauty and the Beast #1–4	2018	978-1302912031
The Defenders: The End Of All Songs	9	The Defenders #138–152; Gargoyle #1–4	2019	978-1302920708

=== Other Volume One collected editions ===
Title	Material collected	Year	ISBN
The Defenders: Tournament of Heroes	The Defenders #62-65	2012	
Omega the Unknown Classic	Omega the Unknown #1-10 and The Defenders #76-77	2006	978-0785120094
Avengers/Defenders War	The Defenders #8–11 and The Avengers #115–118	2002 (TPB); 2007 (HC)	978-0785108443 (TPB); 978-0785127598 (HC)
The New Defenders Volume 1	The Defenders #122–124 and The New Defenders #125–131	2012	978-0785162469

=== The Secret Defenders ===
Title	Material collected	Year	ISBN
Doctor Strange and the Secret Defenders	Secret Defenders #1-11	2016	978-1302901080
Thanos: Cosmic Powers	Secret Defenders #12-14, Cosmic Powers #1-6	2015	978-0785198178
Deadpool and the Secret Defenders	Secret Defenders #15-25	2017	978-1302904173

=== Defenders volume 3 ===
Title	Material collected	Year	ISBN
Defenders: Indefensible	The Defenders (volume 3) #1-5	2006 (HC); 2007 (TPB)	978-0785121527 (HC); 978-0785117629 (TPB)

=== The Last Defenders ===
Title	Material collected	Year	ISBN
The Last Defenders	The Last Defenders #1-6	2008	978-0785125075

=== The Defenders by Matt Fraction (volume 4) ===
Title	Material collected	Year	ISBN
Volume 1	The Defenders vol. 4 #1–6, material from Point One #1, and Fear Itself #7	2012	978-0785158516
Volume 2	The Defenders vol. 4 #7–12	2013	978-0785158530

=== The Fearless Defenders ===
Title	Material collected	Year	ISBN
Volume One - Doom Maidens	The Fearless Defenders #1-6	2013	978-0785168485
Volume Two - The Most Fabulous Fighting Team of All	The Fearless Defenders #7-12	2014	978-0785168492

=== The Defenders by Brian Michael Bendis (volume 5) ===
Title	Material collected	Year	ISBN
Volume 1 - Diamonds Are Forever	Defenders story from Free Comic Book Day 2017, The Defenders vol. 5 #1-5	2017	978-1846538674
Volume 2 - Kingpins of New York	The Defenders vol. 5 #6-10	2018	978-1302907471

=== The Best Defense ===
Title	Material collected	Year	ISBN
The Best Defense	The Immortal Hulk The Best Defense #1, Namor The Best Defense #1, The Silver Surfer The Best Defense #1, Doctor Strange The Best Defense #1, The Defenders The Best Defense #1	2019	978-1302916145

=== Defenders by Al Ewing (volume 6) ===
Title	Material collected	Year	ISBN
Defenders: There Are No Rules	Defenders vol. 6 #1-5	2022	978-1302924720
Defenders: Beyond	Defenders: Beyond #1-5	2023	978-1302946715

=== Other ===
Title	Material collected	Year	ISBN
Hulk, Vol. 3: Hulk No More (collects the "Defenders vs. Offenders" storyline)	Hulk #10–12 plus #13 and #600	2009 (HC); 2010 (TPB)	978-0785139836 (HC); 978-0785140528 (TPB)
The Incredible Hulk Epic Collection #19: Ghosts of the Past (collects The Return of the Defenders storyline)	The Incredible Hulk #397-406, Annual #18-19; material from: Namor the Sub-Mariner Annual #2; Silver Surfer Annual #5; Doctor Strange, Sorcerer Supreme Annual #2; Marvel Holiday Special #2	2015	978-0785192992
Namor the Sub-Mariner by John Byrne and Jae Lee Omnibus (collects The Return of the Defenders storyline)	Namor, the Sub-Mariner #1-40, Annual #1-2; material from Incredible Hulk Annual #18; Silver Surfer Annual #5; Doctor Strange, Sorcerer Supreme Annual #2	2019	978-1302919665
