= List of Masters of Evil members =

The Masters of Evil is a supervillain team appearing in American comic books published by Marvel Comics. Although the roster has changed over the years, the team remains the principal foes, and the evil counterpart, of the superhero team the Avengers.

Listed here are the known members of the Masters of Evil.

== Membership ==
listed alphabetically, after leader

=== Baron Heinrich Zemo's incarnation ===
Avengers #6-7, 9-10, 15-16 (July 1964 - May 1965)

- Baron Heinrich Zemo (leader) - He is an old enemy of Captain America from World War II.
- Black Knight (Nathan Garrett) - A descendant of Sir Percy of Scandia and an enemy of Giant-Man who uses an arsenal of medieval weapons that employ modern technology (including a lance that fired bolts of energy) and genetically engineers and creates a winged horse called Aragorn.
- Enchantress (Amora) - An Asgardian sorceress and an enemy of Thor.
- Executioner (Skurge) - A half-giant companion of Enchantress and an enemy of Thor.
- Melter - An enemy of Iron Man who uses melting devices.
- Radioactive Man - A nuclear physicist with radioactive abilities and an enemy of Thor.
- Wonder Man - The owner of Williams Innovations who gains his ion-based powers from an ion ray. He sacrificed himself to save the Avengers.

=== Ultron's incarnation ===
The Masters of Evil, as featured in Avengers #54 (July 1968), art by John Buscema.

Avengers #54-55 (July - Aug. 1968); 83 (Dec. 1970)

- Ultron-5 (leader) - A robot who was created by Hank Pym.
- Black Knight (Dane Whitman) - The nephew of Nathan Garrett. He joined the team with the intention of betraying them.
- Klaw - A sound-based supervillain who is an enemy of the Black Panther and the Fantastic Four.
- Whirlwind - A mutant with wind-based abilities who is an enemy of Giant-Man and the Wasp.
- Melter
- Radioactive Man

=== Egghead's incarnation ===
Avengers #222 (Aug. 1982); 227 - 229 (Jan. - Mar. 1983)

- Egghead (leader) - A mad scientist with an egg-shaped head who is an enemy of Hank Pym.
- Beetle (Abner Jenkins) - A supervillain in beetle-themed armor who is an enemy of Spider-Man.
- Moonstone - A supervillain whose powers derive from an alien gem who previously fought Captain America and Hulk. She served as Egghead's deputy leader of the Masters of Evil.
- Radioactive Man
- Scorpion (Mac Gargan) - A scorpion-themed supervillain who is an enemy of Spider-Man.
- Shocker (Herman Schultz) - A supervillain wielding vibration gauntlets who is an enemy of Spider-Man.
- Tiger Shark - A tiger shark-themed supervillain who is an enemy of Namor the Sub-Mariner.
- Whirlwind

=== Baron Helmut Zemo's first incarnation ===
Avengers #273 - 277 (Nov. 1986 - Mar. 1987)

- Baron Helmut Zemo (leader) - The son of Baron Heinrich Zemo.
- Absorbing Man - A supervillain who can absorb the properties of anything and is an enemy of Thor and Hulk.
- Blackout (Marcus Daniels) - A Darkforce-manipulating supervillain.
- Black Mamba - A member of the Serpent Society who has Darkforce energy control and illusion-casting abilities. She is an associate who appears as her true identity of Tanya Sealy.
- Fixer (Paul Norbert Ebersol) - A genius-level criminal inventor.
- Goliath (Erik Josten) - A size-shifting supervillain who the Enchantress put through the same procedure as Wonder Man.
- Grey Gargoyle - An enemy of Thor who can temporarily turn anything he touches to stone.
- Mister Hyde - A biochemist and an enemy of Thor who is inspired by the novel Strange Case of Dr. Jekyll and Mr. Hyde and takes a formula that grants him a similar transformation.
- Moonstone
- Screaming Mimi - A supervillain with a sonic scream.
- Tiger Shark
- Titania - A super-strong supervillain who is the love interest of the Absorbing Man.
- Whirlwind
- The Wrecking Crew - A group of supervillains who are enemies of Thor.
  - Bulldozer - A supervillain with an armored metal helmet who fights by ramming his victims head-first.
  - Piledriver - A supervillain who fights with his oversized pile-driving fists.
  - Thunderball - The group's thinker who wields a huge demolition ball on a chain.
  - Wrecker - The team's leader who wields an indestructible crowbar with magical properties. He both hates and fears Thor.
- Yellowjacket - A reluctant supervillain who uses one of Hank Pym's stolen Yellowjacket costumes.

=== Doctor Octopus' incarnation ===
- Doctor Octopus (leader) - A supervillain with four metal tentacles who is an enemy of Spider-Man.
- Absorbing Man
- Gargantua - A 25 ft. supervillain who used to work as a biochemist for S.H.I.E.L.D.
- Jackhammer - A super-strong supervillain who used to work for Silvermane's Hydra branch.
- Oddball - A juggler and street fighter who is a member of the Death-Throws.
- Powderkeg - A super-strong villain who can sweat a nitroglycerin compound.
- Puff Adder - A mutant and Serpent Society member with the power to breathe various debilitating gases (in one instance, the gas was able to eat away a metal lock) and inflate his body mass to a certain extent. He also has superhuman strength and increased physical durability.
- Shocker (Herman Schultz)
- Titania
- Yellowjacket (Rita DeMara)

=== Baron Helmut Zemo's second incarnation / Thunderbolts ===
The Masters of Evil: (from the top) the Screaming Mimi, Goliath, Baron Zemo, the Beetle, the Fixer, and Moonstone

Avengers #270-277 (Aug. 1986 - Mar. 1987), Amazing Spider-Man #283 (Dec. 1986) and West Coast Avengers (vol. 2) #16 (Jan. 1987).

- Baron Helmut Zemo (leader)
- Beetle / MACH-1
- Fixer / Techno
- Goliath / Atlas
- Moonstone / Meteorite
- Screaming Mimi / Songbird

=== The Crimson Cowl's first incarnation ===
- Crimson Cowl (leader) - The daughter of Justin Hammer.
- Aqueduct - A supervillain who can control and shape water and a enemy of Ghost Rider.
- Bison - A bison-themed supervillain who was transformed from an injured basketball player by the Egyptian god Seth and had previously fought Luke Cage and Thunderstrike.
- Blackwing - The son of Silvermane and an enemy of Captain America and Daredevil, who is an expert bat trainer.
- Boomerang - A boomerang-wielding supervillain and an enemy of Spider-Man.
- Cardinal - A supervillain who wears an armored suit that can fly and has a number of offensive weapons including energy blasters, a grenade launcher and a tar gun.
- Constrictor - A boa constrictor-themed supervillain and former S.H.I.E.L.D. agent.
- Cyclone (Pierre Fresson) - A supervillain who wears a costume that enables him to create tornado-force whirlwinds.
- Dragonfly - A dragonfly-themed supervillain and former Maggia member who can fly and has a hypnotic gaze.
- Eel (Edward Lavell) - A supervillain who wears an electrified lubricated suit.
- Flying Tiger - A supervillain whose tiger-like body armor makes him capable of powered flight as well as giving him enhanced strength, durability and endurance, and a set of claws.
- Icemaster - A cryokinetic supervillain.
- Joystick - A supervillain with super-strength and super-speed who also wears a wrist device that creates energy batons.
- Klaw
- Lodestone - A supervillain who can manipulate the magnetic force.
- Man-Ape - A supervillain from Wakanda and an enemy of the Black Panther.
- Man-Killer - A supervillain with super-strength and size-shifting abilities.
- Quicksand - A supervillain who can transform her body into a sand-like substance.
- Scorcher - A supervillain and an enemy of Spider-Man whose insulated suit has flamethrower equipment.
- Shatterfist - A supervillain and an enemy of Thor who wields power gloves that delivers devastating blows.
- Shockwave - A supervillain and an enemy of Shang-Chi whose suit enables him to generate an electric shock.
- Slyde - A supervillain and skilled chemist whose suit grants him super-speed.
- Sunstroke - A solar-manipulating supervillain created by Dominus.
- Supercharger - A supervillain who can absorb, store, and release electricity.
- Tiger Shark - A shark-themed enemy of Namor.

=== The Crimson Cowl's second incarnation ===
- Crimson Cowl (leader)
- Black Mamba
- Cardinal
- Cyclone (Pierre Fresson)
- Gypsy Moth - A telekinetic moth-themed supervillain.
- Hydro-Man - A supervillain and an enemy of Spider-Man who can generate, control, and become water.
- Machinesmith - A robotic genius who can transfer his mind into other machines.
- Man-Killer

=== The Shadow Council's incarnation ===
- Max Fury (first leader) - A rogue Life Model Decoy of Nick Fury.
- Baron Helmut Zemo (second leader)
- Bi-Beast - An android whose has a second head on top of his head.
- Black Talon (Samuel Barone) - A voodoo magician.
- Brothers Grimm (Percy and Barton Grimes) - Two brothers whose costumes enable them to produce matter.
- Carrion (William Allen) - A former S.H.I.E.L.D. scientist exposed to the Carrion virus.
- Constrictor
- Crossfire - A former CIA interrogation expert who became an arms dealer.
- Daimon Hellstrom - The half-human son of the demon Marduk Kurios (a.k.a. "Satan") who became Baron Zemo's magic expert.
- Diablo - An alchemist who is an enemy of the Fantastic Four.
- Eel (Edward Lavell)
- Firebrand - A mutated eco-terrorist.
- Griffin - A beastly supervillain.
- Killer Shrike - A mercenary who was enhanced by Roxxon Energy Corporation
- Lady Stilt-Man (Callie Ryan) - A female counterpart of Stilt-Man.
- Lascivious - A former member of the Grapplers who was given seduction-based powers.
- Letha - An acrobatic wrestler and former member of the Grapplers.
- Madame Masque - She serves as Baron Zemo's right-hand woman.
- Madcap - An insanity-inducing supervillain.
- Pink Pearl - An obese woman with super-strength who is an enemy of Alpha Flight.
- Porcupine (Roger Gocking) - A porcupine-themed supervillain.
- Princess Python - A former member of the Serpent Society and the Circus of Crime who owns a pet African rock python.
- Ringer - A ring-themed supervillain
- Satannish - An extra-dimensional demon.
- Scarecrow - A scarecrow-themed villain.
- Squid (Don Callahan) - A squid-themed supervillain.
- Taskmaster
- Tiger Shark
- Tinkerer - A scientific genius who makes weapons and equipment for supervillains.
- Vengeance (Kowalski) - A former deputy who wields a hellfire shotgun.
- Whiplash (Anton Vanko) - A Russian scientist who wields energy whips.
- The Wrecking Crew
  - Bulldozer
  - Piledriver
  - Thunderball
  - Wrecker
- Young Masters - A young counterpart of the Masters of Evil who are trained by the Constrictor.
  - Alex Wilder - A former member of the Runaways who was resurrected by Daimon Hellstrom.
  - Black Knight (unnamed female) - A female incarnation of the Black Knight.
  - Coat of Arms - A swordswoman whose magic coat grants her six arms.
  - Egghead - A robot.
  - Enchantress (Sylvie Lushton) - A sorceress who claims to be an Asgardian.
  - Excavator - The teenage son of Piledriver and a temporary member of the Wrecking Crew. Excavator wielded an enchanted shovel.
  - Executioner (Daniel DuBois) - A vigilante who is the son of Princess Python.
  - Mako - A test tube Atlantean who was grown from the cell samples of Attuma, Orka, Tyrak, and U-Man.
  - Melter (Christopher Colchiss) - A superhuman and leader of the Young Masters who can cause objects to melt.
  - Mudbug - A mutant with a crayfish-like physiology who was a former student of the Hellfire Club's Hellfire Academy.
  - Radioactive Kid - A young criminal in a hazmat suit has demonstrated the ability to melt and mutate human flesh with a touch.
  - Snot - A former student of the Hellfire Academy who can propel large amounts of snot from his nose.

=== Lightmaster's incarnation ===
- Lightmaster (leader) - A supervillain whose suit enables him to manipulate light.
- Absorbing Man
- Blackout
- Mister Hyde
- Titania
- Whirlwind
- Wrecking Crew
  - Bulldozer
  - Piledriver
  - Thunderball
  - Wrecker

=== Baron Helmut Zemo's third incarnation ===
- Baron Helmut Zemo (leader)
- Atlas
- Fixer
- Klaw
- Man-Killer
- Moonstone
- Tiger Shark
- Whiplash
- Wrecking Crew
  - Bulldozer
  - Piledriver
  - Thunderball
  - Wrecker

=== The West Coast Masters of Evil ===
- Madame Masque (leader)
- Derek Bishop - The father of Kate Bishop.
- Eleanor Bishop - The mother of Kate Bishop who was revived as a vampire.
- Eel
- Graviton - A supervillain with control over gravity.
- Lady Bullseye - A ninja.
- MODOK Superior - A clone of MODOK with the cloned brain of his predecessor.
- Satana the Devil's Daughter (Satana Hellstrom) - The sister of Daimon Hellstrom.

=== Multiversal Masters of Evil ===
- Mephisto (benefactor)
- Doom Supreme (leader) - A version of Doctor Doom from Earth-22215 who is the master of the darkest arts.
- Black Skull - A version of Red Skull from Earth-21798 who possesses the Venom Symbiote. Later dies and gets replaced by another Black Skull from Earth-38590.
- Dark Phoenix - A version of Mystique from Earth-14412 who is host of the Phoenix Force and wears a dark robe.
  - Berserkers - The Mind-controlled pets of Dark Phoenix who consider her their mother.
    - Hound - A version of Wolverine from Earth-83466 who is loyal to Dark Phoenix.
    - Thunderer - A version of Thor from Earth-83466 who is loyal to Dark Phoenix.
- Ghost Goblin - A version of Green Goblin from Earth-45863 with the powers of Ghost Rider who can also throw flaming skull-shaped Noggin Bombs.
- Kid Thanos - A younger version of Thanos taken from the past.
- King Killmonger - A version of Erik Killmonger From Earth-36054 who conquered both Wakanda and Asgard. He wears armor that resembles the Destroyer laced with vibranium.

=== Masters of Evil (One World Under Doom) ===
In One World Under Doom #2, the following villains were identified as the Masters of Evil when they agreed to help the Avengers fight Doctor Doom at the time when he was the Sorcerer Supreme:

- Arcade - A criminal genius who has made use of his Murderworld locations.
- Baron Mordo - A sorcerer who is an enemy of Doctor Strange.
- Doctor Octopus
- MODOK Superior
- Madelyne Pryor - A clone of Jean Grey.
- Mysterio - An illusionist and enemy of Spider-Man.

In Avengers Vol. 9 #25, another Masters of Evil group led a plot to take over the Impossible City to make it their own nation and consisted of the following villains:

- Mad Thinker (leader)
- Dreadknight - A Latverian engineer who had a helmet bio-fused to his head by Doctor Doom's men using the Bio-Fusor for conspiring against Doctor Doom and became a knight-themed villain with his steed Hellhorse.
- Exterminatrix - A villain who utilizes gold-transforming bullets made from the blood of her late adoptive father Doctor Midas.
- Madcap
- Mister Hyde
- Quasimodo Mark X - A rebuilt version of Quasimodo.

== Other versions ==
listed alphabetically, after leader

=== Marvel Adventures ===
- Abomination
- Baron Zemo
- Leader
- Radioactive Man
- Ultron
- Whirlwind

=== House of M ===
- Hood (leader)
- Absorbing Man
- Batroc the Leaper
- Blizzard (Donnie Gill)
- Chemistro (Calvin Carr)
- Cobra (Klaus Voorhees)
- Constrictor
- Crossbones
- Madame Masque
- Mister Hyde
- Nitro
- Sandman
- Titania
- Wizard
- Wrecking Crew
  - Bulldozer
  - Piledriver
  - Thunderball
  - Wrecker

== Other media ==
listed alphabetically, after leader

=== The Avengers: United They Stand ===
- Baron Helmut Zemo (leader)
- Absorbing Man
- Boomerang
- Cardinal
- Dragonfly
- Moonstone
- Tiger Shark
- Whirlwind

=== The Avengers: Earth's Mightiest Heroes ===
- Baron Heinrich Zemo (leader)
- Abomination
- Chemistro
- Crimson Dynamo (Ivan Vanko)
- Enchantress
- Executioner
- Grey Gargoyle
- Living Laser
- Wonder Man

=== Marvel Disk Wars: The Avengers ===
- Red Skull (leader)
- Abomination
- Graviton
- Helmut Zemo
- MODOK
- Tiger Shark

=== Avengers Assemble ===
- Baron Helmut Zemo (leader)
- Beetle
- Goliath
- Fixer
- Moonstone
- Screaming Mimi

=== Marvel: Ultimate Alliance ===
- Doctor Doom (leader)
- Arcade
- Baron Mordo - One of Doctor Doom's lieutenants
- Bullseye
- Crimson Dynamo (Valentin Shatalov)
- Dragon Man - He left the group.
- Enchantress - One of Doctor Doom's lieutenants.
- Executioner
- Fin Fang Foom
- Grey Gargoyle - He left the group.
- Lizard
- Loki - One of Doctor Doom's lieutenants.
- The Mandarin - He left the group after trying to take away the leadership position from Doctor Doom.
- MODOK
- Mysterio
- Radioactive Man
- Rhino
- Scorpion
- Shocker
- Ultron - One of Doctor Doom's lieutenants.
- Winter Soldier
- Wrecking Crew
  - Bulldozer
  - Piledriver
  - Thunderball
  - The Wrecker
