= List of Hydra members =

This page lists the known members of Hydra, an evil organization appearing in American comic books published by Marvel Comics.

== High Council of Hydra ==
The High Council of Hydra consist of:

- Elisa Sinclair - The current Madame Hydra and former lover of Daniel Whitehall.
- Kraken (Daniel Whitehall) - First appeared in Secret Warriors #2.
- Gorgon
- Hive - Introduced in Secret Warriors #2.
- Viper - Leader of Hydra's New York City branch who also goes by the name Madame Hydra.
- Arnim Zola
- Doctor Faustus
- Kraken - An unnamed man who was presumed dead and recruited by Elisa Sinclair to become the latest Kraken.

Former members of the High Council:

- Baron Wolfgang von Strucker - The Supreme Hydra as revealed in Strange Tales #150 (Nov 1966).
- Valentina Allegra de Fontaine - Former S.H.I.E.L.D. agent. She was later revealed to have succeeded Viper as Madame Hydra.

== Supreme Hydra ==
The Supreme Hydra (also called the Hydra Supreme) is a term given to the leader of Hydra. At other times, the title has also been used to refer to the leaders of various Hydra branches and splinter groups. Besides Baron Strucker, among the known Supreme Hydras in order of appearance are:

- Arnold Brown - The Imperial Hydra who was the organization's figurehead.
- Ryuji Hiraoka - A Shinto Imperialist who was the first leader of Hydra, wielding the Spear of Imhotep. He was killed by Baron Strucker, who usurped his position.
- Supreme Hydra - The unnamed Supreme Hydra who tried to destroy Hulk.
- Silvermane - "Supreme Hydra" of the East Coast.
- Count Otto Vermis - The Supreme Hydra and father of Octavia Vermis who is the leader of a European Hydra fragment. He was killed when Spider-Woman attacked his escape jet.
- Sn'Tlo - A Skrull who infiltrated Hydra and rose to the rank of Hydra Supreme under the alias Sensational Hydra.
- Edgar Lascombe - The Supreme Hydra who was responsible for the creation of the Hydra Four.
- Captain America - An alternate version of Captain America who was a Hydra sleeper agent.

== Army of Evil ==
Baron Helmut Zemo formed the Army of Evil, a large-scale alliance of villains, to serve Hydra. In their first appearance, the Army of Evil attack Manhattan in retaliation for what happened at Pleasant Hill. The Army of Evil are kept in stasis pods until Hydra Supreme gives orders to awaken them so that they can help Hydra fight the heroes. Before Zemo can complete the job, he is thwarted by Black Panther and Winter Soldier.

- Absorbing Man - A supervillain who can absorb the properties of any matter.
- Armadillo - An armadillo-themed supervillain.
- Baron Blood - A vampire. Baron Zemo found him in a cave.
- Blackout - A Darkforce-manipulating supervillain who was used by Baron Zemo to create a Darkforce dome around Manhattan.
- Blue Streak - A member of the Fast Five.
- Circus of Crime - A circus-themed villain group.
  - Ringmaster - Leader of the Circus of Crime.
  - Clown - The third clown-themed supervillain.
  - Fire-Eater - A fire-eater.
  - Great Gambonnos - Italian acrobats.
  - Strongman - A strongman.
  - Teena the Fat Lady - A sideshow performer.
- Count Nefaria - A Maggia crimelord with ion-based abilities.
- Cyclone - A criminal whose costume enables him to create whirlwinds.
- Dragonfly - A dragonfly-themed supervillain.
- Ferocia - A villain who was magically-evolved from a K'un-L'un wolf.
- Graviton - A gravity-manipulating supervillain.
- Grey Gargoyle - A villain who can turn anyone he touches to stone.
- Gypsy Moth - A gypsy moth-themed villain.
- An unidentified Hobgoblin - This Hobgoblin was only shown through his silhouette.
- Jack O'Lantern - A jack-o'-lantern-headed villain.
- Kraven the Hunter - A big game hunter.
- Lady Bullseye - A female counterpart of Bullseye.
- Living Laser - A supervillain whose body is made from photons.
- Madame Menace - The CEO of Baintronics.
- Masters of Evil - This is Baron Zemo's third incarnation of the Masters of Evil before he made it part of the Army of Evil.
  - Atlas - A size-shifting supervillain.
  - Klaw - A solid sound supervillain who wields a sonic emitter.
  - Moonstone - A supervillain who wields a Kree gravity stone.
  - Tiger Shark - A tiger shark-themed supervillain.
  - Wrecking Crew - A group of supervillains who are enemies of Thor.
    - Bulldozer - A supervillain with an armored metal helmet who fights by ramming his victims head-first.
    - Piledriver - A supervillain who fights with his oversized pile-driving fists.
    - Thunderball - The group's thinker who wields a huge demolition ball on a chain.
    - Wrecker - The team's leader who wields an indestructible crowbar with magical properties.
- Mister Hyde - A biochemist who is inspired by Dr. Jekyll and Mr. Hyde and takes a formula that grants him a similar transformation.
- MODOK Superior - A robot sporting the cloned brain of MODOK.
- Nitro - An explosive supervillain.
- Regent - A supervillain whose suit enables him to copy the powers of anyone.
- Scorcher - A supervillain whose insulated suit has flamethrower equipment.
- Serpent Solutions - A group of snake-themed supervillains.
  - Anaconda - An anaconda-themed supervillain.
  - Boomslang - A boomslang-themed supervillain.
  - Bushmaster - A bushmaster-themed supervillain with cybernetic arms and a cybernetic tail in the place of the lower half of his body.
  - Coachwhip - A coachwhip-themed supervillain.
  - Cobra - A cobra-themed supervillain who is the nephew of King Cobra.
  - Cottonmouth - A cottonmouth-themed supervillain with bionic jaws.
  - Death Adder - A death adder-themed supervillain.
  - Fer-de-Lance - A fer-de-lance-themed supervillain.
  - Princess Python - A snake charmer who controls a large python.
  - Puff Adder - A puff adder-themed supervillain who can inflate his body.
  - Rock Python - An African rock python-themed supervillain with a rock-hard body.
  - Sidewinder - A sidewinder-themed supervillain.
  - Slither - A mutant with a snake-like body.
  - Viper - A viper-themed supervillain.
- Squid - A squid-themed supervillain.
- U-Foes - A group of four supervillains.
  - Ironclad - A metal-skinned member of the U-Foes.
  - X-Ray - A member of the U-Foes who was permanently transformed into a living energy field.
  - Vapor - A member of the U-Foes who can alter her form into any known gas.
  - Vector - The telekinetic leader of the U-Foes.
- Wizard - An inventor of great renown, stage magician, and escape artist.
- Whirlwind - A mutant with wind-based abilities
- Yellowjacket - The CEO of Cross Technological Enterprises who wears a size-shifting yellowjacket-themed armor.

== Hydra's Avengers ==
The team consists of:

- Black Ant - A Life Model Decoy of Eric O'Grady who was recruited into Hydra alongside Taskmaster. He later defected from the group during the final battle.
- Deadpool - Joined Hydra's Avengers motivated by his loyalty to Captain America. He later defected from the group after realizing what Captain America pretended to do.
- Odinson - Odinson freely joined Hydra's Avengers after having been deceived into believing that Hydra could help Jane Foster and was psychologically broken due to his current state of unworthiness. He has since defected from the group.
- Scarlet Witch - She was later free from the possession with the help of Doctor Strange.
- Superior Octopus - Doctor Octopus' mind that escaped into Ben Reilly's Proto-Clone of Peter Parker and was later approached by Arnim Zola. Becoming the Superior Octopus, he made a duplicate of his Superior Spider-Man outfit with a copy of his tentacles that would fit this new form.
- Taskmaster - Recruited by Madame Hydra into the new Hydra hierarchy alongside Black Ant. He later defected from the group.
- Vision

== Hydra agents ==
The following characters are or were agents of Hydra:

- Agent #07564 - A Hydra agent who became the co-host of Peter Peña's TV show following Hydra's rise to power.
- Agent Dakini -
- Anton Trojak - Annihil-Agent, 47, Scientist (deceased).
- Baron Helmut Zemo - The 13th Baron Zemo and son of Heinrich Zemo. Became a Hydra leader in All-New Captain America #1.
- Blackwing - Air Action Division Leader of the East Coast and the son of Silvermane.
- Bob, Agent of Hydra - Foot soldier of Hydra.
- Bob Oppenheimer - Hydra accountant. Killed by Deadpool after mistaking him for Bob, Agent of Hydra.
- Bull's Eye - Hired assassin employed by Hydra.
- Chameleon - Sometimes a Hydra employee. Worked for Hydra in Incredible Hulk #154.
- Commander Kraken - Naval Action Division Leader of the East Coast.
- Congressman Woodman - Commander of Washington D.C. Branch of Hydra.
- Crippler
- Crossbones - A mercenary who is often employed by Hydra.
- Daniel Whitehall
- D.O.A. - Short for Department of Occult Armaments.
  - Bronskon - Founder of D.O.A.
  - Lieutenant Gregory Belial - Founder of D.O.A. He has vast knowledge of various forms of magic.
  - Innards - Member of D.O.A. He can remove his vital organs and use them for various offensive purposes.
  - Madame Jasmine - Founder of D.O.A.
  - Malpractice - The current leader of D.O.A.
  - Moorek - Founder of D.O.A.
  - Rotwrap - A mummy-like member of D.O.A.
  - Pyre - Founder of D.O.A.
- Dr. M - A Hydra scientist
- Elliot Kohl - Hydra Soldier, now imprisoned.
- Elsie Carson - Former Southwestern U.S. Regional Field Director, Corporate Hydra.
- Fixer - Special Agent, Hydra fragment.
- Fox - Administration Division Leader of the East Coast.
- George Fistal -
- Green Mamba - The son of Jessica Drew, Gerry Drew was captured by Hydra and forced into their servitude.
- Gremlin - After surviving his encounter with Iron Man during the "Armor Wars" storyline, Gremlin worked with Hydra to brainwash powered children into serving him while posing as a similar child named Titan.
- Grim Reaper - Self-appointed head of Hydra's New York branch. Revealed as Hydra leader in Avengers #106 (Dec 1972).
- Hardball - Former member of the Fifty State Initiative.
- Hank Johnson
- Hellfire - A Hydra double agent.
- Hydra Four - Creations of Hydra who were trained to kill the Avengers. There were other tubes containing these Super Hydra Agents, but only four of them were opened.
  - Bowman - Hydra's version of Hawkeye who wields a bow and uses Trick Arrows.
  - Hammer - Hydra's version of Thor. He had the same powers as Thor except for immortality and wields a technological copy of Mjolnir.
  - Militant - Hydra's version of Captain America who wields a shield made from an unknown alloy.
  - Tactical Force - Hydra's version of Iron Man who wielded a copy of the Iron Man armor with Hydra's color scheme. His first name is Karl.
- Jackhammer - Engineer Corps leader of the East Coast.
- El Jaguar - Commando Division Leader of the East Coast. Killed by Scourge of the Underworld.
- James Winderfield - Part-time Agent of Corporate Hydra.
- Jared Kurtz - Hydra agent from Europe.
- Jude - A Hydra double agent and Tony Stark's biological father.
- Karl Kraus - Double Agent for Hydra.
- Kingpin - Actual director of Hydra's Las Vegas branch.
- Laura Brown - Special Hydra Agent H (later G).
- Lieutenant Cassandra Romulus -
- Lieutenant Garrotte -
- Lieutenant Guillotine -
- Lieutenant Saltz -
- Dr. Loxias Crown - A Hydra scientist who kidnapped Morbius, the Living Vampire to study his vampiric infliction. During his escape he bit the scientist turning him into a Living Vampire like himself taking the name "Hunger"
- Man-Killer - Assassins Division Leader of the East Coast.
- Mentallo - Special Agent, Hydra fragment.
- Mockingbird - A double agent working for Maria Hill.
- Ms. Fischer -
- Ms. Fisher - Hydra recruiter.
- Nancy Winderfield - Part-time Agent of Corporate Hydra.
- Number 72 - Leader of Hydra fragment.
- Punisher - After Hydra took over the United States, Frank Castle became one of Hydra's enforcers, as he believed that the Hydra Supreme could resurrect his family.
- Ralph Sanzetti - Assassin, Corporate Hydra (deceased).
- Red Skull - True leader of Hydra's Las Vegas branch. Currently believed to be deceased at the hands of Captain America.
- Robbie Fleckman - A rookie Hydra agent who Pepper Potts meets.
- Robert Rickard - Hydra Agent U (deceased).
- Ron Takimoto (deceased) -
- S.H.I.E.L.D. Super-Agents
  - Knockabout -
  - Psi-Borg -
  - Violence -
- Sathan (deceased) -
- Carmilla Black - Hardball's lover and former agent of S.H.I.E.L.D.
- Sergeant Batrel -
- Silver Fox
- Space Phantom - A Space Phantom was revealed as a Hydra leader in Avengers #106 (Dec 1972)
- Spider-Man (Bat Soldier version) - A bat soldier who poorly impersonated Spider-Man and kidnapped Gwenpool in order to be a guest on Peter Peña's TV show following Hydra's rise to power. With help from Gwenpool, Peña assisted in knocking out the bat soldier and Agent 07564.
- Spider-Woman (Jessica Drew) - Special Agent under Count Otto Vermis.
- Werner von Strucker - Eldest son of Wolfgang and half-brother of Andrea and Andreas Strucker. Killed by Wolfgang's descendant.
- William Darvin - Agent of Corporate Hydra (deceased).
- Hunt-Rosado - Agent of Healthcare Hydra, Location unknown
- E. Thompson - Agent of Healthcare Hydra, Location unknown
- C. Jenkins - Agent of Healthcare Hydra, Location unknown

== Marvel Cinematic Universe ==
In the Marvel Cinematic Universe, Hydra was founded in ancient times, formerly as a cult centered around the fanatical worship of Hive, a powerful Inhuman who was exiled to the planet Maveth by ancient Inhumans. Over the centuries in Captain America: The First Avenger, the cult evolved, taking many forms, with its most recent incarnation coming into existence shortly after the rise of Nazism in Germany under the leadership of Johann Schmidt as the scientific branch of the Nazi Schutzstaffel. However, as revealed in Captain America: The Winter Soldier, Hydra was secretly rebuilt inside S.H.I.E.L.D. by Schmidt's top scientist Arnim Zola, who was recruited into the agency during Operation Paperclip. When Hydra emerges, S.H.I.E.L.D. is labeled as a terrorist organization while most of its non-Hydra members leave S.H.I.E.L.D. to work the private sector or go off the grid in the second season of the television series Agents of S.H.I.E.L.D..

=== 19th century members ===
- Lord Thornally – an English noble and a member of the Hydra society in the 1800s. Deceased.
- Lord Manzini – an English nobleman and a member of Hydra in the 1839. Deceased.
- Younger Lord – an English noble and a member of the Hydra society in the 1800s. Deceased.
- Nobleman – an English noble and a member of the Hydra society in the 1830. Deceased.

=== World War II era members ===
- Johann Schmidt – The leader of Hydra, a special weapons division of the Nazi Schutzstaffel and a modern-day incarnation of the ancient society.
- Arnim Zola – A Swiss-born scientist working for Hydra before, during, and after World War II. Zola was offered a position in S.H.I.E.L.D., the newly formed peacekeeping organization, as part of Operation Paperclip. Deceased.
- Werner Reinhardt – Later known as Daniel Whitehall, was one of the most prominent leaders of Hydra. Originally a high ranking officer of the Nazi Schutzstaffel, during World War II he led many expeditions to recover mysterious artifacts for Hydra, working under the command of the infamous Red Skull. Despite his capture by the Strategic Scientific Reserve in 1945, Reinhardt continued to have influence in Hydra, once offering advice to Gideon Malick, until he was finally freed in 1989 by undercover members of Hydra within S.H.I.E.L.D. Back in his old base, he used organs and DNA from an Inhuman named Jiaying to de-age himself and have a middle-aged appearance into the 21st century. Deceased.
- Lohmer – A high ranking officer of Hydra during World War II. Deceased.
- Kleiber – An officer of Hydra during World War II. Unknown.
- Hydra Lieutenant – An Obersturmführer (lieutenant) of Hydra during World War II. Unknown.
- Hydra Fortress Officer – A Lieutenant of Hydra during World War II. Unknown.
- Hydra Officer – A Lieutenant of Hydra during World War II who worked under Werner Reinhardt until Hydra's defeat. Unknown.
- Velt – The manager of a Hydra weapons facility during World War II. Deceased.
- Vincent Beckers – A scientist who worked for Hydra during World War II. Deceased.
- Heinz Kruger – One of Hydra's top assassins during World War II. He successfully assassinated Abraham Erskine under the order of Red Skull, but committed suicide to avoid interrogation after his capture by Steve Rogers. Deceased.
- Wolfgang Brenner – A subordinate of the Red Skull and high-ranking member of Hydra. Status unknown.

=== Post-WWII members ===
- Wilfred Malick – A former bartender who, after his father's suicide and the loss of his family's wealth, was forced to work for Eric Koenig. Malick was recruited by Hydra, and ordered to transport the ingredients for the Super Soldier Serum. Now a member of Hydra, Malick rebuilt his family's fortune, took part with the infiltration of S.H.I.E.L.D. and joined ancient Hydra beliefs in Hive, participating with ceremonies to select their sacrifices for Hive, although Malick would often cheat these. Deceased.
- Gideon Malick – Wilfred's first son who, was a powerful businessman, political figure and one of the leaders of Hydra, while he eventually became the Hydra head that other heads feared. Having been raised by his father to follow Hydra's ancient beliefs based around the eventual return of Hive through sacrifices, Gideon had later become one of Hydra's infiltrators within the World Security Council. Deceased.
- Nathaniel Malick – Wilfred's second son and Gideon's brother, and a member of the Hydra faction that worshiped Hive. When their father died, Nathaniel was betrayed by his brother and selected to be teleported to Maveth as a sacrifice to Hive. In an alternate time, in 1973, Nathaniel meet Daisy Johnson and watched her use her powers, being impressed. Nathaniel used parts of Johnson's body to acquire her powers, and allied himself with Sibyl, the leader of the Chronicoms, on a mission to destroy S.H.I.E.L.D. Over time, Nathaniel recruited several members into his team, including Kora and John Garrett, and also led to the stealing of Kora's powers. Deceased.
- Viola – A Hydra operative. In 1931, she assisted Wilfred Malick in delivering a vital ingredient of the Super Soldier Serum to a Hydra buyer at Hell's Harbor.
- Joe – A Hydra operative who was sent by Wilfred Malick to assassinate Daniel Sousa.
- Lana – A Hydra operative, sent by Wilfred Malick to attack Daniel Sousa.
- Ron – A Hydra operative who worked as one of Nathaniel Malick's subordinates in an alternate timeline.

=== Modern era members ===
==== S.H.I.E.L.D. cell ====
- Alexander Pierce – High-ranking member, World Security Council member, politician, S.H.I.E.L.D. leader, branch leader. Deceased.
- Arnim Zola – High-ranking member, scientist, leader. Deceased.
- Jasper Sitwell – High-ranking officer. Deceased.
- Brock Rumlow – S.T.R.I.K.E. operative. Deceased.
- Jack Rollins – S.T.R.I.K.E. operative.
- Hauer – A Hydra operative working as a S.H.I.E.L.D. agent.
- Russo – An undercover Hydra operative inside S.H.I.E.L.D. and the Executive Officer of the Helicarrier IN-01. Deceased.
- Mitchell Carson – A former Head of Defense at S.H.I.E.L.D. who was secretly an undercover Hydra operative.
- Mark Basso – A Hydra operative, working deep undercover as an agent of S.H.I.E.L.D., assigned to transport the Scepter to Sokovia for Wolfgang von Strucker's Hydra cell.
- Mark Smith – An agent of S.H.I.E.L.D. who joined Hydra.
- Lead Hydra Agent – One of the Hydra agents in charge on the aircraft carrier Iliad during the Hydra Uprising. Deceased.

==== Winter Soldier Program ====
- Vasily Karpov – A Hydra operative embedded inside the Russian Armed Forces who was given the responsibility for overseeing the Winter Soldier Program, successfully arranging the assassination of Howard Stark and the deployment of the newly created Winter Soldiers. Deceased.
- Bucky Barnes – Assassin. Defected.
- Josef – Test subject, assassin. Deceased.
- Super Soldier #2 – Test subject, assassin. Deceased.
- Super Soldier #3 – Test subject, assassin. Deceased.
- Super Soldier #4 – Test subject, assassin. Deceased.
- Super Soldier #5 – Test subject, assassin. Deceased.
- Wilfred Nagel – Scientist. Deceased.

==== Centipede Project ====
- John Garrett – Project leader. Deceased.
- Raina – Recruiter. Deceased.
- Grant Ward – High-ranking member. Deceased.
- Edison Po – Soldier. Deceased.
- Brian Hayward – Test subject, soldier. Deceased.
- Centipede Soldier 2 – Test subject, soldier. In custody.
- Centipede Soldier 3 – Test subject, soldier. In custody.
- Ian Quinn – Scientist. Deceased.
- Debbie – Doctor. Deceased.
- Chan Ho Yin – Test subject. Deceased.
- Akela Amador – Coerced agent.
- Mike Peterson – Coerced agent.
- Englishman – Coerced handler. Deceased.
- Kaminsky – Soldier. Unknown.
- Ernesto – Barber.

==== Malick family's cell and Hive cult ====
- Hive – Idol, leader. Deceased.
- Wilfred Malick – High-ranking member, branch leader. Deceased.
- Gideon Malick – High-ranking member, World Security Council member, branch leader. Deceased.
- Nathaniel Malick – Operative. Deceased.
- Kirk Vogel – High-ranking member, Inner Circle member. Deceased.
- Stephanie Malick – Operative. Deceased.
- Giyera – Operative. Deceased.
- Lucio – Brainwashed. Operative. Deceased.
- Turkish Old Man – Security.

==== Wolfgang von Strucker's cell ====
- Wolfgang von Strucker – High-ranking member, branch leader. Deceased.
- List – High-ranking member, scientist. Deceased.
- Pietro Maximoff – Test subject and operative. Deceased, Defected. Deceased.
- Wanda Maximoff – Test subject and operative. Defected. Deceased.
- Paula – Operative.
- Carmine – Operative.

==== Daniel Whitehall's cell ====
- Daniel Whitehall – High-ranking member, branch leader. Deceased.
- Sunil Bakshi – High-ranking member. Deceased.
- Marcus Scarlotti – Soldier. In custody.
- Agent 33 – Brainwashed operative. Deceased.
- Grant Ward – High-ranking operative. Deceased, Defected.
- Lingenfelter – Scientist.
- Kenneth Turgeon – Scientist.
- Jemma Simmons – Scientist (infiltrator). Defected.
- Carl Creel – Brainwashed assassin. Deceased, Defected.
- Donnie Gill – Brainwashed operative. Unknown.
- Bobbi Morse – Security (infiltrator). Defected.
- Julien Beckers – Politician. In custody.
- Toshiro Mori – Engineer. Deceased.
- Theo – Security.

==== Round Table ====
- Octavian Bloom – High-ranking member, branch leader. Deceased.
- Sheikh – High-ranking member, branch leader. Deceased.
- Baroness – High-ranking member, branch leader. Deceased.
- Banker – High-ranking member, branch leader. Deceased.

==== Grant Ward's cell ====
- Grant Ward – High-ranking member, director, branch leader. Deceased.
- Kebo – High-ranking member, Operative. Deceased.
- Werner von Strucker – Operative. Deceased, Defected.
- Spud – Recruiter. Deceased.
- Tat – Operative.
- Lance Hunter – Recruit (infiltrator). Defected.

==== Hale's cell ====
- Hale – High-ranking member, United States Armed Forces officer, leader. Deceased.
- Ruby Hale – Daughter of General Hale, operative. Deceased.
- Candice Lee – Operative.
- Carl Creel – Operative. Deceased, Defected.
- Anton Ivanov – Coerced operative. Deceased.
- Werner von Strucker – Operative. Deceased.
- Glenn Talbot – Brainwashed operative. Deceased, Defected.

==== Others ====
- Stern – Politician. In custody.
- Jensen – Scientist. In custody.
- Joseph Getty – Scientist. Defected.
- Hydra Buyer – Operative. Deceased.
- Yuri Zaikin – Operative. In custody.
- Viktor Orlov – Operative. In custody.
- Fischer – High-ranking member, United States Armed Forces officer. Deceased.
- Steger – Professor. Deceased.
- L. Atwood – Politician. In custody.
