= Slyde =

- Slyde in his first appearance cover by Ron Frenz and Josef Rubinstein

Publication information
- Publisher: Marvel Comics
- First appearance: The Amazing Spider-Man #272 (Jan 1986)
- Created by: Tom DeFalco; Sal Buscema

In-story information
- Alter ego: Jalome Beacher
- Species: Human
- Team affiliations: Masters of Evil; Thunderbolts
- Notable aliases: The Teflon Coated Man
- Abilities: Skilled chemist Wears chemical lubricant-laced suit that grants: Ability to move at superhuman speeds Incredible maneuverability Ability to easily escape from a grappling hold

Slyde (Jalome Beacher) is a supervillain appearing in American comic books published by Marvel Comics.

== Publication history ==
Slyde first appeared in The Amazing Spider-Man #272 and was created by writer Tom DeFalco and artist Sal Buscema.

== Fictional character biography ==
Jalome Beacher is a chemical engineer who creates a non-stick coating that can be applied to anything, only to be fired by his employers. He creates a costume coated in the substance and decided to use it to rob banks. His suit allows him to slide across floors with relative ease, and renders him impervious to Spider-Man's webbing. The suit has pads on the gloves so that Slyde can grip objects without them slipping from his grasp.

Slyde appears as part of the seventh incarnation of the Masters of Evil, founded by the Crimson Cowl. He joins the group in battling the Thunderbolts.

Upon the realization that he is turning forty soon, Slyde dons a new costume and attempts to rob a bank in a ploy to lure Spider-Man out in order to fight him. After being defeated and brought to jail, Slyde muses that, knowing that he "went toe to toe with Spider-Man", he is entirely all right with middle age.

In Wolverine, Slyde is apparently killed by Elektra. He is later revealed to be Jalome's stepbrother Matthew, who assumed the costume and identity of Slyde while he was in prison.

Jalome, as Slyde again, along with the Trapster, meets with mob boss Hammerhead, who was attempting to organize a group of super-criminals to take advantage of the Civil War between superheroes. However, Slyde balks at the proposal. He is shot in the head and killed by Hammerhead's enforcer Underworld to send a message to those who would refuse to join Hammerhead's organization.

During the "Avengers: Standoff!" storyline, Slyde appears alive as a resident of Pleasant Hill, a gated community established by S.H.I.E.L.D.

== Other characters named Slyde ==
- Following Beacher's death, an unknown person succeeds him as Slyde and joins the 50 State Initiative.
- An undercover NYPD police officer assumes the Slyde mantle during Spider-Man: Brand New Day.
- After losing her powers during M-Day, Stacy X uses a modified Slyde suit along with Stilt-Man armor, web shooters, and Frog-Man springs.

== Powers and abilities ==
The chemicals on the suit that Slyde wears allow him to move at nearly 30 miles per hour (48 km/h), making him very agile and difficult to attack. He is also a skilled chemist.

== In other media ==
Slyde appears in the Spider-Man episode "The Road to Goblin War", voiced by Phil LaMarr. This version is a former worker at the Beemont Chemical Corporation who was fired by CEO Alan Beemont and became Slyde to get revenge and cause chaos. Additionally, he received his technology from Joseph Rockwell, Beemont's assistant and a member of the Goblin Nation.
