= Pink Pearl (disambiguation) =

Pink Pearl may refer to:

- a pink-colored pearl, which is produced naturally by some mollusks, especially the queen conch
- Pink Pearl, an album by American singer/songwriter Jill Sobule
- Pink Pearl (apple), an apple cultivar developed in 1944 by northern California breeder Albert Etter
- Pink Pearl (comics), a fictional terrorist in comics published by Marvel Comics
- Pink Pearl (eraser), a writing product registered to the Newell Rubbermaid company
- "Pink Pearl of Persia", an episode of the 1966 animated television series Batfink
- Pink Pearl, the GLBTQIA+ employee network of Shell in The Netherlands (in Dutch)
