= Sunstroke (disambiguation) =

Sunstroke, or heat stroke, is a spectrum of disorders due to environmental heat exposure.

Sunstroke may also refer to:

- Sunstroke (1953 film), a Danish film directed by Astrid Henning-Jensen and Bjarne Henning-Jensen
- Sunstroke (1992 film), a television film with Don Ameche
- Sunstroke (2014 film), a Russian film directed by Nikita Mikhalkov
- "Sunstroke" (song), by Chicane, 1997
- Sunstroke, a member of the Marvel comics supervillain team Masters of Evil

== See also ==
- SunStroke Project, a musical group that represented Moldova in the Eurovision Song Contest 2010 and 2017
- Heatstroke (disambiguation)
