= Masters of Evil =

Marvel Comics supervillain team

- Baron Heinrich Zemo's incarnation of the Masters of Evil on the cover of The Avengers #6 (Aug. 1964); Art by Jack Kirby and Chic Stone.

Publication information
- Publisher: Marvel Comics
- First appearance: The Avengers #6 (July 1964)
- Created by: Stan Lee; Jack Kirby; Chic Stone

Roster

The Masters of Evil is a supervillain team appearing in American comic books published by Marvel Comics. The first version of the team appeared in The Avengers #6 (July 1964), with the lineup continually changing over the years.

== Publication history ==
The first version of the Masters of Evil debuted in The Avengers #6, created by Stan Lee and Jack Kirby.

The second version of the Masters of Evil debuted in The Avengers #54, created by Roy Thomas, John Buscema, and George Tuska.

The third version of the Masters of Evil debuted in The Avengers #222, created by Jim Shooter, Steven Grant, and Greg LaRocque.

The fourth version of the Masters of Evil debuted in The Avengers #270, created by Roger Stern, John Buscema, and Tom Palmer.

The fifth version of the Masters of Evil debuted in Guardians of the Galaxy #28, created by Jim Valentino, Herb Trimpe, and Steve Montano.

The sixth version of the Masters of Evil debuted in The Incredible Hulk #449, created by Kurt Busiek and Mark Bagley.

The seventh version of the Masters of Evil debuted in Thunderbolts #3 created by Kurt Busiek, Mark Bagley, and Vince Russell.

The eighth version of the Masters of Evil debuted in Secret Avengers #21.1, created by Rick Remender, Patrick Zircher, and Andy Troy.

The ninth version of the Masters of Evil debuted in Thunderbolts #10, created by Jim Zub, Jon Malin, Kurt Busiek, and Mark Bagley.

== Fictional team biography ==
=== Baron Heinrich Zemo's Masters of Evil ===
The original Masters of Evil (consisting of existing supervillains Black Knight, Melter, and Radioactive Man) was gathered by Baron Heinrich Zemo. Despite attempting to capture the Avengers with Adhesive X and spreading it over New York City, the Avengers find an antidote with the help of Paste-Pot Pete, give it to the Masters in secret, and then send most of the members to jail. Zemo is tricked into opening a container filled with tear gas inside his helicopter, but escapes anyway.

Baron Zemo leads the team in his revenge on Captain America and the Avengers. The team had been joined by the Enchantress and the Executioner, whom Zemo found in their exile to Earth that was imposed on them by Odin for attacking Thor. The Enchantress hypnotizes Thor into attacking the Avengers, but Iron Man breaks him out of the trance. Meanwhile, Captain America is lured to South America to fight Zemo. After defeating Zemo, Captain America returns on Zemo's helicopter and stops Zemo from shooting the Avengers. However, Enchantress casts a spell that gets the helicopter to the rooftop she and the Executioner are on. The Executioner knocks Captain America out by striking his shoulder, and takes him out of the helicopter, after which they all try to escape. The Masters are sent to another dimension in a space warp generated by Thor.

Two issues later, Enchantress returns them to Earth using a spell. Simon Williams is given superhuman strength with an ionic ray, though he is told he will die in a week unless given an antidote Zemo has. He captures the Wasp and lures the Avengers into a trap, but sacrifices himself to save the Avengers. Immortus appears and offers to help the Masters by defeating the Avengers. He succeeds in sending Captain America to the Tower of London in 1760. The Masters attack the Avengers, but Captain America manages to return. The Enchantress, sensing defeat, sends the villains back in time to before they met Immortus.

In a later issue, Zemo kidnaps Rick Jones with an attractor beam and has the Enchantress and the Executioner release the Black Knight and the Melter (the Radioactive Man having been deported back to China). They attack the other Avengers, forcing Captain America to go alone to Zemo's kingdom to rescue Rick. The Executioner tells the Avengers that a battle in the city would hurt many people, meaning they should surrender. Captain America blinds Zemo with his shield and Zemo dies when he accidentally triggers a rock slide. The Black Knight and the Melter are captured after Thor transports them to another dimension with different scientific laws, meaning their weapons rebound. However, Enchantress and Executioner escape before they can be transported.

=== Ultron's Masters of Evil ===
The Masters of Evil, as featured in Avengers #54 (July 1968), art by John Buscema

The second version, organized by Ultron-5 in his Crimson Cowl disguise, consisted of Black Knight (Dane Whitman), Klaw, Melter, and Whirlwind. Radioactive Man is also added to the group after being sprung from the group. The Dane Whitman version of Black Knight receives an invitation in Nathan Garrett's mailbox, as Ultron-5 was unaware that Garrett had died. Whitman decides to join the group as a spy. Ultron-5 also captures Edwin Jarvis and used him as a proxy. Learning of Ultron-5's plot, Black Knight attempts to warn the Avengers, only for Ultron-5 to learn of his plan. The Avengers were taken captive by the Masters of Evil. However, Jarvis escapes and helps Black Knight rescue the Avengers while exposing Ultron-5 has Crimson Cowl. The Masters of Evil are defeated by the Avengers, but Ultron-5 escapes.

=== Egghead's Masters of Evil ===
Criminal scientist Egghead organizes a third version, consisting of Moonstone (who is made deputy leader), Scorpion, Tiger Shark, and Whirlwind. Egghead uses this incarnation to assist him in making technological breakthroughs. When Whirlwind decides to attack Wasp by himself, Moonstone leads Scorpion and Tiger Shark in retrieving him. The villains are defeated by the Avengers.

After that incident, Egghead keeps only Moonstone and Tiger Shark on the team, while Scorpion and Whirlwind are replaced with Beetle, Shocker, and Radioactive Man. Shocker is brainwashed as part of a plot by Egghead to bring Hank Pym into the Masters of Evil. While Pym is on trial, the Masters of Evil invade the courtroom and attempt to make the public believe that Pym is their leader. When Egghead attempts to shoot Pym, Hawkeye shoots his arrow into his gun, causing it to overload and kill Egghead. Beetle and Moonstone cooperate with the Avengers and tell them that Egghead framed Pym, who is cleared of all charges.

=== Baron Helmut Zemo's Masters of Evil ===
Baron Helmut Zemo forms the fourth version of the Masters of Evil from over a dozen villains, consisting of Absorbing Man, Blackout, Black Mamba, Fixer, Goliath, Grey Gargoyle, Mister Hyde, Moonstone, Screaming Mimi, Tiger Shark, Titania, Whirlwind, the Wrecking Crew (Bulldozer, Piledriver, Thunderball and Wrecker), and Yellowjacket, created with the goal of obtaining vengeance on Captain America and overwhelming the Avengers with sheer power. The villains storm Avengers Mansion and beat Hercules into a coma.

A later flashback reveals that Augustus Roman's family died during the fight between the Avengers and this incarnation of the Masters of Evil.

=== Doctor Octopus' Masters of Evil ===
The fifth incarnation was organized by Doctor Octopus, but bore little resemblance to previous incarnations. Its roster included Gargantua, Jackhammer, Oddball, Powderkeg, and Puff Adder, in addition to former members Absorbing Man, Shocker, Titania, and Yellowjacket. Doctor Octopus uses this incarnation of the Masters of Evil to steal the technology of the Avengers and ends up fighting the original Guardians of the Galaxy, a superhero group from an alternate future timeline. When Gargantua, Puff Adder, and Shocker become sympathetic towards the Guardians of the Galaxy, they turn on Doctor Octopus, who flees.

=== Baron Helmut Zemo's second Masters of Evil ===
The Masters of Evil: (from the top) the Screaming Mimi, Goliath, Helmut Zemo, Beetle, Fixer, and Moonstone, art by Mark Bagley

The sixth incarnation of the Masters of Evil are assembled by Helmut Zemo and pose as superheroes known as the Thunderbolts. In addition to Zemo, the team consisted of Beetle, Fixer, Goliath, Moonstone, and Screaming Mimi. All of the group's members eventually become true heroes and renounce their criminal ways, though Zemo, Fixer, and Moonstone all return to villainy some time later.

=== Crimson Cowl's Masters of Evil ===
The seventh incarnation of the Masters of Evil is assembled by the Crimson Cowl (Justine Hammer) and consists of Cyclone, Flying Tiger, Klaw, Man-Killer, and Tiger Shark. Crimson Cowl later recruits Aqueduct, Bison, Blackwing, Boomerang, Cardinal, Constrictor, Dragonfly, Eel, Icemaster, Joystick, Lodestone, Man-Ape, Quicksand, Scorcher, Shatterfist, Shockwave, Slyde, Sunstroke, and Supercharger into the group. The Masters of Evil plot to get control of Earth's superhuman mercenaries and tried to get the Thunderbolts to join them. The Masters of Evil are defeated by the Thunderbolts, but the Crimson Cowl escapes while using Dallas Riordan as a decoy.

=== Crimson Cowl's second Masters of Evil ===
The eighth incarnation, led by the Crimson Cowl, consists of Black Mamba, Cardinal, Cyclone, Gypsy Moth, Hydro-Man, Machinesmith, and Man-Killer. Crimson Cowl uses this incarnation in her second attempt to master and control Earth's superhuman mercenaries. While Cyclone tries to steal a disc containing information on a weapon that would have assisted in this plot, Crimson Cowl gets Cardinal on her side by claiming that Hawkeye killed his daughter Meteorite. When the Thunderbolts catch up to the Masters of Evil, Hawkeye shows them that the disc actually contains a biotoxin that Justin Hammer would have used to kill them all. This causes Cardinal, Cyclone, Gypsy Moth, and Man-Killer to forcefully aid the Thunderbolts in attacking Hammer.

=== The Shadow Council's Masters of Evil ===
Max Fury of the Shadow Council forms a ninth incarnation of the Masters of Evil, consisting of Princess Python, Vengeance, and Whiplash. Fury later recruits Black Talon, the Brothers Grimm, Carrion, Constrictor, Crossfire, Diablo, Firebrand, Griffin, Killer Shrike, Lady Stilt-Man, Pink Pearl, and Squid to join the Masters of Evil. Fury hires Taskmaster to retrieve the Crown of Wolves from Baglia. Taskmaster succeeds, but he and Fury are unable to control the Crown's power, causing Taskmaster to be possessed by the Abyss. Taskmaster is eventually freed from the Abyss after Agent Venom destroys the Crown.

The Masters of Evil are featured in the series "Avengers Undercover", where the surviving captives of Arcade's Murderworld (Note: As depicted in Avengers Arena.) infiltrate Bagalia to kill Arcade. Following the death of Max Fury, Helmut Zemo has become the new leader of the Masters of Evil. After a fight with the villains, Cullen Bloodstone is accepted into the Masters of Evil and teleports his accomplices into Arcade's casino, where Arcade is apparently killed by Hazmat. While the other young heroes take up Zemo's offer to join the Masters of Evil (with a plan to take the group down from within), Cammi is the only one to decline. She attempts to flee, only to be caught by Constrictor.

=== Lightmaster's Masters of Evil ===
Lightmaster assembles a more traditional lineup (10th incarnation) when he and his henchmen, the Wrecking Crew, encounter the Superior Spider-Man and his Superior Six while attacking Alchemax. Besides the Wrecking Crew, this roster includes the Absorbing Man, Titania, Mister Hyde, Whirlwind, and Blackout.

=== Baron Helmut Zemo's third Masters of Evil ===
Baron Helmut Zemo created an 11th incarnation consisting of Whiplash, Man-Killer, Klaw, Tiger Shark, and the Wrecking Crew, all of whom had been members of previous incarnations of the Masters of Evil. Zemo sends them out to persuade Atlas of the Thunderbolts to rejoin the team. However, they are thwarted by Jolt.

During the Secret Empire storyline, Zemo has Kobik send Bucky Barnes back through time to World War II and another battle with the Thunderbolts, in which the Man-Killer was apparently killed by Kobik. After Atlas, the Fixer, and Moonstone join the Masters of Evil, they worked to reassemble Kobik. As Erik Selvig hordes the fragments that he has, kisses them, and commits suicide, the Kobik-reprogrammed Captain America persuades Zemo to have the Masters of Evil join Hydra's "Army of Evil."

=== West Coast version ===
To combat the West Coast Avengers, Madame Masque formed a West Coast version of the Masters of Evil consisting of Eel, Graviton, Lady Bullseye, MODOK Superior, Satana, Derek Bishop, and Eleanor Bishop.

=== Multiversal Masters of Evil ===
Mephisto suggests to Doom Supreme to form a team of evil villains that would take on the Avengers. As a condition from the Council of Red, Doom Supreme is to save Earth-616 for last. He forms a multiversal version of the Masters of Evil consisting of Black Skull, Dark Phoenix, Ghost Goblin, Kid Thanos, and King Killmonger.

=== One World Under Doom ===
During the "One World Under Doom" storyline, the Avengers form a reluctant alliance with the Masters of Evil (Arcade, Baron Mordo, Doctor Octopus, MODOK Superior, Madelyne Pryor, and Mysterio) to combat Doctor Doom. Separately, Mad Thinker forms a new incarnation of the Masters of Evil with Dreadknight, Exterminatrix, Madcap, Mister Hyde, and Quasimodo. The Masters of Evil attack the Impossible City, but are repelled by the City, Captain America, and Black Panther.

== Related teams ==
=== Young Masters ===
During the "Dark Reign" storyline, a young version of the team - controlled by criminal mastermind Norman Osborn - debuts in the miniseries Dark Reign: Young Avengers.

=== Bastards of Evil ===
A group calling themselves the Bastards of Evil debuted in the 2010 "Heroic Age" storyline. All members claim to be the children of supervillains who were discarded and disavowed by their parents. They include Aftershock (the supposed daughter of Electro), Warhead (the supposed son of the Radioactive Man), Mortar (the supposed daughter of the Grey Gargoyle), Singularity (the supposed son of Graviton), and Ember (the supposed son of Pyro).

It was later revealed that the Bastards are led by a child genius known as Superior (who claims to be the son of the Leader). It was also revealed that the Bastards were actually normal teenagers who were mutated by exposure to radiation by Superior and given false memory implants. The surviving Bastards are held in the Raft after their capture.

=== Masters of Animal Evil ===
Ziggy Pig formed an animal-themed counterpart of the Masters of Evil called the Masters of Animal Evil consisting of Armadillo, a black mamba implied to be owned by Black Mamba, an octopus version of Doctor Octopus, Doom Fish, Dragon Man, Red Ghost's Super-Apes, and several of Swarm's bees. It is unclear whether the octopus and Doom Fish are owned by Doctor Octopus and Doctor Doom respectively. They fought the Pet Avengers and were defeated by them.

== Reception ==
=== Critical response ===
Darby Harn of Screen Rant included the Masters of Evil in their "10 Most Powerful Hercules Villains In Marvel Comics" list, and in their "15 Most Powerful Black Panther Villains" list. Mark Ginocchio of ComicBook.com ranked the Master of Evil 1st in their " Marvel's 5 Greatest Supervillain Stables" list." Jerry Stanford of Comic Book Resources ranked 3rd in their "10 Most Important Marvel Villain Teams" list, while David Harth ranked the team 6th in their "5 Best Marvel Villain Teams (& The 5 Best DC Villain Teams)" list.

== Other versions ==
=== Heroes Reborn (1996) ===
An alternate universe iteration of the Masters of Evil appear in Heroes Reborn: Masters of Evil, initially consisting of Black Knight, Klaw, Melter, Radioactive Man, and Whirlwind before Klaw leaves the group and the Crimson Dynamo and Titanium Man take his place. After Doctor Doom's Doombots kill Black Knight, Crimson Dynamo, and Titanium Man, Whirlwind leaves the group to start a new life.

=== "Heroes Reborn" (2021) ===
A group based on the Masters of Evil called the Masters of Doom appear in "Heroes Reborn" (2021), consisting of Doctor Juggernaut, Silver Witch, All-Gog, and the Black Skull. This version of the group are enemies of the Squadron Supreme of America and were previously imprisoned in the Negative Zone.

=== House of M ===
An alternate reality iteration of the Masters of Evil appear in House of M: Masters of Evil, formed and led by the Hood and consisting of Absorbing Man, Batroc the Leaper, Blizzard, Chemistro, Cobra, Constrictor, Crossbones, Madame Masque, Mister Hyde, Nitro, Sandman, Titania, Wizard, and the Wrecking Crew. This version of the group was formed to defy Magneto. While taking over the Central American country of Santo Rico, its dictators Madison and Lionel Jeffries kill two of the Wrecking Crew, Bulldozer and Piledriver. Though the group succeed in killing the Jeffries in turn, Magneto and Sebastian Shaw expose the Masters of Evil's criminal pasts, leading to Cobra, Crossbones, Hyde, Chemistro, Wizard, and Wrecking Crew member Thunderball abandoning the remaining members, most of whom are killed by the Red Guard, though Absorbing Man throws Titania to safety.

=== Marvel Adventures ===
The Masters of Evil appear in Marvel Adventures #4, consisting of Helmut Zemo, Abomination, Leader, and Ultron. Additionally, a group called the New Masters of Evil appear in Marvel Adventures: The Avengers #16, consisting of Egghead, Man-Bull, Melter, and Whirlwind.

=== Marvel 2099 ===
A future incarnation of the Masters of Evil from Earth-2099 appear in the Marvel 2099 story Spider-Man 2099: Exodus #3, consisting of Patriot, Black Knight, Baron Zemo, Enchantress, Melter, and Radioactive Man. This version of the group killed several members of the Avengers and conquered multiple worlds. After Zemo kills the Black Knight for disobeying orders, the Masters of Evil are defeated by the New Avengers and remanded to a prison on the planet Wakanda.

=== Ultimate Marvel ===
A group based on the Masters of Evil called the Liberators appear in Ultimates 2, formed by Loki under the alias of Norwegian scientist "Gunnar Golman" and consisting of Abomination, Crimson Dynamo, Schizoid Man, Colonel Abdul al-Rahman, Hurricane, Insect Queen, and Perun. They received support from their respective international governments, such as China, France, Iran, North Korea, Syria, and later Russia, and other superpowered individuals such as Natasha Romanoff / Black Widow, Hank Pym, and his Ultron / Vision sentries to invade the United States. However, they are defeated by the U.S.'s heroes, with Perun surrendering to S.H.I.E.L.D. and being held in the Triskelion and Loki being held by Odin for inciting a world war.

== In other media ==
=== Television ===
- The Masters of Evil appear in The Marvel Super Heroes episode "Zemo and his Masters of Evil", consisting of Heinrich Zemo, Black Knight, Radioactive Man, and Melter.
- The Masters of Evil appear in The Avengers: United They Stand episode "Command Decision", consisting of Helmut Zemo, Absorbing Man, Boomerang, Cardinal, Dragonfly, Moonstone, Tiger Shark, and Whirlwind. They targeted a dangerous shipment of weapons where they fought the Avengers and Captain America.
- The Masters of Evil appear in The Avengers: Earth's Mightiest Heroes. To distract the Avengers from his scheme to conquer the nine realms, Loki has the Enchantress and the Executioner approach Baron Heinrich Zemo to form and lead the team, consisting of them, Arnim Zola, Wonder Man, Crimson Dynamo, Abomination, Grey Gargoyle, Chemistro, and Living Laser. They battle the Avengers twice until Zemo betrays the Enchantress to seize control of her and Loki's armies for himself. Following Loki's defeat by the Avengers, the Enchantress seeks vengeance against Zemo and hunts down the Masters of Evil, forcing Zemo to seek the Avengers' help. In the aftermath, Zemo's team is incarcerated in Prison 42, while the Enchantress is enslaved by Surtur.
- The Masters of Evil appear in Marvel Disk Wars: The Avengers, consisting of MODOK, Abomination, Heinrich Zemo, Graviton, and Tiger Shark.
- The Masters of Evil appear in Avengers Assemble, consisting of Helmut Zemo, Beetle, Fixer, Goliath, Moonstone, and Screaming Mimi. Following failed attacks on Stark Industries and Avengers Tower, the Masters of Evil reappear as the superhero team, the Thunderbolts, via a shrouding device to mask their appearances. However, Screaming Mimi has a change of heart and convinces her teammates to join the Avengers in exposing Zemo, who escapes while the remaining Masters of Evil turn themselves in.
- The Masters of Evil appear in the first season of Marvel Future Avengers, consisting of the Leader, Enchantress, Ares, Winter Soldier, and Bruno, a teenage Hydra operative who underwent genetic manipulation. The group is recruited by Kang the Conqueror and join forces with Hydra and Loki to enact the "Emerald Rain" project, a plan to reverse-engineer Terrigen crystals and use them to mutate Earth's populace to become Kang's new foot soldiers. The Winter Soldier and Bruno later defect, with Bruno joining the Future Avengers.

=== Video games ===
- The Masters of Evil appear in Marvel: Ultimate Alliance, led by Doctor Doom and consisting of Baron Mordo, Loki, Enchantress, and Ultron as his lieutenants as well as Arcade, Attuma, Bullseye, Byrrah, Crimson Dynamo, Executioner, Fin Fang Foom, Lizard, MODOK, Mysterio, Radioactive Man, Rhino, Scorpion, Shocker, Tiger Shark, Warlord Krang, Winter Soldier, and the Wrecking Crew. Additionally, the Mandarin, Grey Gargoyle, and Dragon Man appear as former members who left when the Mandarin failed to take leadership from Doom.
- The Masters of Evil appear in a self-titled DLC pack for Lego Marvel's Avengers, consisting of Helmut Zemo, Enchantress, Black Knight, Skurge, Melter, Radioactive Man, and Whirlwind.
