= Ultron =

Supervillain appearing in Marvel Comics

- Timeless: Villains Variants cover of Avengers #66 (March 2023). Art by Alex Ross.

Publication information
- Publisher: Marvel Comics
- First appearance: Cameo: The Avengers #54; (July 1968); Full appearance: The Avengers #55; (August 1968)
- Created by: Roy Thomas (writer); John Buscema (artist)

In-story information
- Species: Robot, artificial intelligence
- Team affiliations: Masters of Evil; Lethal Legion; Sons of Yinsen; Phalanx
- Notable aliases: Crimson Cowl; Ultron-5 (and hundreds of other sequential numerical designations)
- Abilities: See list: Genius artificial intelligence; Technopathy; Adamantium robotic body grants: Superhuman strength, speed, and durability; Flight; Energy absorption and projection; Hypnosis; Nigh-indestructibility; Adaptive self-repair

Ultron is a supervillain appearing in American comic books published by Marvel Comics. Created by writer Roy Thomas and artist John Buscema, the character first made a cameo appearance in The Avengers #54 (1968) as the Crimson Cowl, before being fully introduced in The Avengers #55 (1968) as Ultron-5, the Living Automaton. An artificial intelligence created by founding Avenger Hank Pym, Ultron later developed a god complex, becoming one of the greatest enemies of the Avengers.

Regarded as one of the most powerful and dangerous villains in the Marvel Universe, he has come into repeated conflict with the Avengers and is one of their primary recurring antagonists. Although stories often end with Ultron's apparent destruction, the character's self-adaptive artificial consciousness returns in upgraded forms marked by sequential numerical designations. Ultron's primary robotic body is usually made of the unbreakable metal adamantium and possesses superpowers such as superhuman strength, flight, energy projection, and control over technology, including legions of his Ultron Drones.

Some offshoot iterations of Ultron have deviated from the original's hatred of humanity and demonstrated varying morals. His first creation, the Vision, joined the Avengers, Ultron-12 (Mark Twelve) became a superhero, and Ultron-8 served as the stepfather of the supervillain Ashley in the alternate continuity of Old Man Logan.

The character has been listed among the greatest and most notable villains in Marvel Comics, and has been adapted in various media incarnations. James Spader portrayed Ultron in his live-action debut in the Marvel Cinematic Universe (MCU) film Avengers: Age of Ultron (2015), and later reprised the role in the Disney+ miniseries VisionQuest (2026). Tom Kane, Jim Meskimen, Ross Marquand, and others have provided the character's voice in animation and video games.

== Publication history ==
Ultron was created by writer Roy Thomas and artist John Buscema. The character first made an unnamed cameo appearance in The Avengers #54 (July 1968), before being fully introduced in The Avengers #55 (August 1968). Thomas acknowledged that he found naming characters difficult, and said he liked the -tron suffix and went from there. The use of the suffix and the prior appearance of a group of robots named Ultroids led him to the name Ultron. Thomas said the idea of the character and his appearance were heavily based on Makino, an obscure robotic villain who appeared in an issue of the Captain Video comic book. He liked the robot's malicious-looking smile, showing this to Buscema.

Jocasta, a robot created by Ultron featured in a number of Ultron storylines, was created by Jim Shooter and George Pérez for The Avengers #162 (August 1977).

== Fictional character biography ==
=== Creation and early appearances ===
Created by Hank Pym by basing the robot on his own brain patterns, the robot (dubbed "Ultron") gradually developed its own intelligence and rebelled. After gaining sentience, Ultron hypnotises and brainwashes its "father" into forgetting that the robot had ever existed, and begins to improve its design and rebuild itself, upgrading several times from Ultron-2, Ultron-3, Ultron-4, and finally Ultron-5. Ultron creates the synthezoid Vision as a weapon to destroy the Avengers.

Later, Ultron-5, the Living Automaton leads his own version of the Masters of Evil (consisting of Black Knight, Klaw, Melter, Radioactive Man, and Whirlwind) against the Avengers, having hypnotized Edwin Jarvis into working for him as the first Crimson Cowl. While planning to blackmail New York, they were betrayed by Black Knight.

Now referring to himself as Ultron-6, he uses the alloy adamantium to upgrade his body for an almost indestructible state and takes the name Ultimate Ultron. Its plans to destroy humanity are again thwarted by the Avengers. Ultron-7 is later created by Maximus with the body of the android Omega, attacking the wedding of Inhuman Crystal and Avenger Pietro Maximoff / Quicksilver, and battling the Avengers, Inhumans and Fantastic Four before being destroyed again. Ultron-8 is responsible for Jocasta's creation as a robotic bride, before being destroyed shortly afterwards.

=== Battleworld and Ultron-12 ===
Ultron-9 and Ultron-10 brainwash heroes into recreating the robot, before turning and being defeated. After being recreated as Ultron-11 by the Beyonder and battling in Battleworld, the Thing brings Ultron's head back to Earth as a souvenir, and is forgotten when there is an attack by the alien Dire Wraiths.

Ultron-12 enters an alliance with the Grim Reaper and his allies (Nekra, Erik Josten, Man-Ape, and Black Talon) in a bid to destroy Wonder-Man. Although the villains are defeated by the West Coast Avengers, Ultron-12 begins to form a relationship with his "father" Hank Pym. Rebuilding itself, Ultron-11 comes into conflict with Pym and Ultron-12. With Wonder-Man's assistance, they destroy Ultron-11 and Ultron-12 begins to deactivate. Ultron-12 tells Pym it was glad it could help save him.

=== Amalgamation and the Ultron Imperative ===
Victor von Doom rebuilds Ultron using a combination of all of its previous personalities with a particularly strong dose of the previous Ultron, believing this mix will make Ultron subservient. However, all 12 iterations co-exist as separate personalities, resulting in a form of madness which culminates with Ultron-12 mutilating himself in an attempt to remove some of his other personalities. After its defeat, Ultron-13 attempts to obtain a new form of vibranium called Nuform, but it is repelled by the combined efforts of Iron Man, Black Panther, and Spider-Man. Ultron escapes from prison and upgrades into the Ultimate Ultron, capturing West Coast Avenger Mockingbird to use her brain patterns to create the new robotic mate Alkhema. Alkhema aids Ultron, but both are eventually jettisoned into space through a ruse by Vision. Vision finds Ultron-15 but is discovered to have been "infected" by human emotion and is seriously deteriorating, displaying symptoms that resemble alcoholism. Ultron-16 and Ultron-17 successfully slaughter the population of Slorenia, having perfected a process that allows it to control a vast army of Ultron bodies.

=== 2000s ===
The Avengers discovered that Ultron's creations (Vision, Jocasta and Alkhema) have a secret program included, in which they are subconsciously compelled to rebuild Ultron. In this case, it is Alkhema who unintentionally rebuilds Ultron when attempting to create a new species of bio-synthezoids. However, Ultron's new body is composed of steel, not adamantium, and is destroyed when Alkhema's subterranean base exploded after Hawkeye shot Alkhema with a vibranium arrow at Alkhema's request. Ultron's head was recovered by Antigone, an artificial girl and one of the synthezoids.

Iron Man encounters a version from an old version of his armor and Ultron's head that leads the cult known as the Sons of Yinsen in an attempt to conquer via religion. The character is defeated by Iron Man and Jocasta. Ultron-10A creates the cyborg Victor Mancha as a sleeper agent against the Avengers. Mancha, however, rebels and joins the Runaways. This version first poses as Doctor Doom before revealing itself, and is defeated in a battle against the Runaways and Excelsior.

When Marvel launched a new title The Mighty Avengers by Brian Michael Bendis and Frank Cho, Ultron interfaces with Iron Man's armor, which had been integrated with Tony Stark's biology. This allows Ultron's program to transform Stark into a new version who has the Wasp's appearance albeit with a metallic skin. This version takes control of Iron Man's technology. He kills Lindy Reynolds, causing the Sentry to battle Ultron, nearly tearing his head off. Ultron is eventually destroyed by Ares of the New Avengers using a computer virus to wipe Ultron's program from Iron Man's armor, changing Stark back to normal. Ultron's image later briefly appears on one of his maker's computers.

The Phalanx and the Super-Adaptoid began the Annihilation: Conquest with invasions that started with the Kree space. Later by taking control of Adam Warlock's body, Ultron hopes to achieve "true techno-organic perfection" but is eventually forced to abandon Adam's body by Warlock and is later destroyed in combat by Wraith and Quasar.

In the limited series Avengers/Invaders, it is revealed that S.H.I.E.L.D. Life Model Decoys have been partly replaced with versions of Ultron. When the original Human Torch appears in the present, they covertly parasitize the Human Torch's unique android physiology and become more human. The combined super teams (but mainly the Human Torch himself), however, discover the plan and destroy the androids.

=== 2010s ===
In the Mighty Avengers, Ultron is shown to infiltrate Jocasta and the Infinite Avengers Mansion. He names himself Ultron Pym and seeks to kill and replace his father before using his Infinite Mansion to conquer the universe. Pym eventually offers Ultron a compromise, allowing Jocasta to be Ultron's bride, on the condition that Ultron banishes himself to ultraspace. Ultron agrees, but warns that he will be ruler of all someday.

In The Avengers, the team visits a possible future in which almost all of humanity is destroyed by Ultron. Kang the Conqueror attempts to enlist them to defeat the robotic foe, but another group of heroes and villains, plucked from all over time and space, ends up destroying this version.

Later, also in Avengers, a cabal of super-intelligent supervillains discovers a Galadorian Spaceknight's inert body and attempts to reactivate its power source, hoping to exploit it. Although the Avengers interrupt their attempts, the body activates, revealing that Ultron's consciousness was contained within and had escaped destruction after Annihilation: Conquest. The new version escapes, and Iron Man predicts that it will bring the apocalypse for humanity when he returns.

During the "Age of Ultron" storyline, which takes place in an alternate universe, Ultron has returned and conquers the world while slowly remolding it into his image. His Ultron Sentinels are guarding the streets looking for any fugitives. Hawkeye runs into the Ultron Sentinels and rescues the Superior Spider-Man, and manages to destroy the Ultron Sentinels present. It is later revealed that Ultron is actually in the future and has been using Vision as a conduit to punish humanity. While one strike team travels into the future to fight Ultron, Wolverine and Susan Storm go back in time to kill his creator before Ultron's creation in the first place. This results in a world where Stark controls an army of robotic drones and Morgan le Fay has conquered half of the world. Traveling back in time once more, Wolverine succeeds in stopping himself from killing Pym, and Wolverine, Pym, and Storm come up with a different plan. This plan results in a different outcome of the prior confrontation between the Avengers and the Intelligencia—a 'back door' installed into Ultron at his original creation allows Pym and Iron Man to destroy the robot, instead, averting the events that led to the "Age of Ultron".

It is later revealed that the Avengers had trapped an unidentified iteration of Ultron in deep space years earlier, sealing him inside a Quinjet. In the present, the Quinjet crash-lands on Titan, freeing Ultron. By hijacking the ISAAC computer, he transforms Titan into Planet Ultron and launches a plan to infect the universe with a nanite virus that transforms organic creatures into Ultron Sentries. The ensuing confrontation with the Avengers leads to Ultron inadvertently merging with his maker, transforming into a human/machine hybrid. The resulting fusion plays on Pym's self-loathing of his own human weakness and causes an acceptance of this new state. Ultron is defeated when Starfox's powers force love onto himself, causing the part of that is now Pym to accept his old weakness and flaws while the villain has a mental breakdown and flees into space.

As part of the "All-New, All-Different Marvel" branding, Ultron's fused form resurfaces. While on his way back to Earth, Pym helps the crew of a spaceship that is being attacked by a hostile insectoid alien. After coming aboard the spaceship, Pym introduces himself as well as his "friend" Ultron to the crew. He later returns to Earth, where the Wasp and Captain America discover that Ultron has taken complete control and is using Pym's face to fool his maker's old friends. After Ultron incapacitates Deadpool, Cable, and the Human Torch, the Wasp initiates the Icarus Protocol, and Iron Man is called in to help stop Ultron with the Hulkbuster Armor's aid. The Avengers defeat Ultron by plunging the hybrid into the sun, but Pym and Ultron survive and continue to battle internally.

During the "Secret Empire" storyline, Ultron's fused form sets up a base in an unidentified forest. After being alerted to the approach of Sam Wilson's task force by a robot version of Jarvis, Ultron decides to give his "family" a warm welcome. When an A.I. based on Tony Stark and Captain America's team confront each other, they are captured by Ultron, who forces both teams to sit at a dinner table. Ultron argues that he is doing this because the Avengers have become less of a family over the years, as so many of them jump to obey Captain America or Iron Man despite past experience confirming that this should be a bad idea. Stark counters that the only reason the team failed as a family was because of Pym's attack on Wasp. Outraged, Ultron nearly attacks the other heroes, but Scott Lang talks him down by arguing that Pym remains his own inspiration. Ultron allows Stark's team to leave with the fragment, arguing that he will leave Captain America's plans with Hydra alone as it appears to be the best chance for world peace.

During "The Ultron Agenda" arc, Ultron returns to Earth with plans to merge robots with humans, like how Pym was merged with Ultron, so that he can make the ultimate lifeform. In addition, he starts to call this form "Ultron Pym". After testing the process and experimenting on Wonder Man and Vision, Ultron Pym plans to make a fusion of Jocasta and Wasp. Iron Man and Machine Man interfere, with the resulting battle causing Iron Man to be molecularly bonded to the Ultronbuster armor. The combined efforts of Stark Unlimited enable them to create an atomic separator that separates Stark from the Ultronbuster armor and Wonder Man from Vision. Ultron Pym prepares to take revenge on Iron Man. This leads to Iron Man revealing what he discovered about the human and robot fusion: The person who merged with it has died, and the robot can only simulate their personality. In other words, his maker was killed when accidentally merging with Ultron. Learning about this and not wanting to risk proving Iron Man's point by having the atomic separator used on him, Ultron surrenders to Iron Man, knowing that Pym is dead. When the Avengers arrive, they restrain Ultron in a Vibranium casket reinforced with Asgardian magic until they can find a permanent place to have Ultron imprisoned.

=== 2020s ===
As Ant-Man and Stinger were moving Ultron's prison to a desert to shrink it into the Microverse where it will be in, Ultron mastered the bug language, contacting Black Ant and having him free him. He slowly rose to power by 2549, becoming All-Father Ultron. To combat him, 2549's Ant-Man went back in time to enlist the past versions of Hank Pym, Scott Lang, and Eric O'Grady for help and brought them to 2549 to defeat Ultron.

It was revealed that the fragment of Hank Pym managed to escape from Ultron at the time and recreate his body, which ended up older. While paranoid after being Ultron's "meat puppet", Hank Pym allied with Black Ant, and they formed their version of the Lethal Legion by killing and reviving select villains. By the time Wasp learned the truth, Ultron-12 hijacks the "Victor Shade" persona in Whirlwind's body. Wasp remembered Ultron-12 as the "good Ultron" who then stated that he went through a soft reboot and knocked out Hank to protect him from the Lethal Legion, who Ultron has taken over. In the nick of time, Wasp, Moon Knight, and Ultron-12 receive aid from Ant-Man, Luke Cage, Nadia van Dyne, Stinger, Valkyrie, and Vision to fight the possessed Lethal Legion. Being given codes for the nano-ants from the future, Hank advises Nadia to "think big" as Ultron-12 agrees with his "dad" on it. Ultron proceeds to control Lodestone into recreating his body from different scrap metals as he controls the drones. Ultron-12 abandoned Whirlwind's body as the nano-ants left the Lethal Legion's body, leaving Ultron's body frozen in its spot. Ultron-12 uses the nanos to recreate his body, which he names Mark Twelve, until he can come up with a better name. After Hank and the Lethal Legion leave to regroup in Sub-Atomica as part of Protocol S, Vision scans Mark Twelve's body and finds no trace of Ultron in him. Mark Twelve then allows Nadia to consider him her brother.

Following his mental breakdown after merging with Hank Pym and being forced into self-introspection via self-care by Starfox's powers, Ultron suspends himself in Earth's orbit and held an internal council with a million other Ultron versions, coming to the conclusion that his single-minded drive to conquer Earth and defeat the Avengers is short-sighted. During his inner council of Ultrons, each version has to defend its existence and ideas. The versions who are rejected get deleted, while those who present new and potentially beneficial ideas are awarded a body. One of the Ultrons is recruited by Iron Man and joins the West Coast Avengers. Ultron agrees to give Iron Man access to his source code to alleviate suspicions over his intentions.

== Powers and abilities ==
The visual appearances and powers of Ultron have varied, but common powers include superhuman levels of strength, speed, stamina, durability, and reflexes; flight at subsonic speeds; and various offensive weapons such as concussive blasts of energy fired from its optical sensors or hands and an "encephalo-ray", which places victims into a deathlike coma. The latter ray also allows Ultron to mesmerize and mind-control victims, or implant subliminal hypnotic commands within their minds to be enacted at a later time. Ultron also has the ability to convert electromagnetic radiation into electrical energy for use or storage. Ultron has an enhanced intellect, a capacity for creative intelligence and self-repair, superhuman cybernetic analytical capabilities, and the ability to process information and make calculations with superhuman speed and accuracy. The character is an expert roboticist and strategist.

Ultron's outer armor is usually composed primarily of adamantium, which is almost completely impervious to damage. (Note: The first use of the term adamantium in Marvel Comics was made in reference to Ultron in The Avengers #66, published in July 1969.) Most Ultron units are powered by a small internal nuclear furnace and incorporate a "program transmitter" which can transmit part or all of Ultron's memory/personality system into other computer systems or duplicate robotic bodies. Ultron can also control other machines remotely. Ultron has occasionally reformed itself with a humanoid appearance above the waist and the appearance of a complex machine, including tractor beam apparatus for flight, below the waist. A later Ultron model developed hive mind technology, allowing it to animate and control hundreds of other Ultron bodies simultaneously, although only the 'prime' Ultron was composed of adamantium while others were made of steel or secondary adamantium due to lack of resources. Ultron also used an internal molecular rearranger that lets him restructure his physical form. He also uses the device in ways its own creator never dreamed, such as converting matter into energy and back by sheer force of will, something Ultron 6 often made use of during his battles with the Avengers. What circuitry Ultron has is shielded to protect from damage, although the Scarlet Witch is capable of causing malfunctions via hex power, Johnny Storm using nova burst managed to damage Ultron's internal circuits while its outer armor remained intact, and Wonder Man was once able to destroy an Ultron by throwing it so hard its internal systems were damaged.

Ultron's travels through outer space have greatly expanded upon the mad machine's intellectual and mechanical capacity in new and intriguing ways. Having made contact with the parasitic biotechnical Phalanx species, Ultron has made his own derivative of the techno-organic virus called the Ultron Virus which he can use to infect any machine or person and turn them into an extension of himself, allowing him to control their actions.

Ultron has power over technology in all of his appearances, and often has abilities to control and transform matter by infecting it with the Ultron Virus. Abilities powerful enough to commandeer whole planetary and even universal expanses in a single inning, on top of his natural ability to invent and fabricate the most sophisticated of mechanical systems ever conceived. Through his abilities, Ultron could change and morph areas into cables, pipes and metal that moved in any direction he wanted This effect becomes stronger the more mass he assimilates, and he once transformed many Kree Sentries into a massive body resembling him.

Individuals infected with the Ultron Virus can spread it in a similar way to how biological viruses can transfer, through cuts and scratches or direct physical interaction, such as barbs or plug-in-like apparatuses generated from the transformed physiology. Ultron later found himself physically as well as mentally bonded with Hank Pym. The fused entity now boasts all of Ultron's robotic powers as well as Pym's scientific acumen. Ultron can now change and alternate his size and mass at will through the acclimation of his maker's Pym Particle-enhanced physiology. Besides being able to grow to incredible heights in seconds, Ultron can shrink down to sub-quantum scale to shift between dimensions via accessing the Microverse. Ultron once used such a tactic to shunt its mass into another dimension for the purpose of riding a neutrino to escape burning up in the sun. Another practice the union shares is a galaxy-spanning collective mind established through the Ultron Virus; every iteration of Ultron created through initial infection shares a hive mind intelligence.

== Reception ==
=== Accolades ===
- In 2006, Wizard Magazine ranked Ultron 189th in their "Top 200 Comic Book Characters" list.
- In 2009, IGN ranked Ultron 23rd in their "Top 100 Comic Book Villains" list.
- In 2019, IGN ranked Ultron 18th in their "Top 25 Marvel Villains" list.
- In 2022, The Mary Sue ranked Ultron 9th in their "Strongest Marvel Villains" list.
- In 2022, Newsarama ranked Ultron 8th in their "Best Marvel supervillains" list.
- In 2022, The A.V. Club ranked Ultron 20th in their "28 best Marvel villains" list.
- In 2022, Screen Rant included Ultron in their "20 Most Powerful Marvel Villains" list.
- In 2022, CBR.com ranked Ultron 1st in their "10 Scariest Avengers Villains" list and 2nd in their "10 Coolest Avengers Villains" list.

== Other versions ==
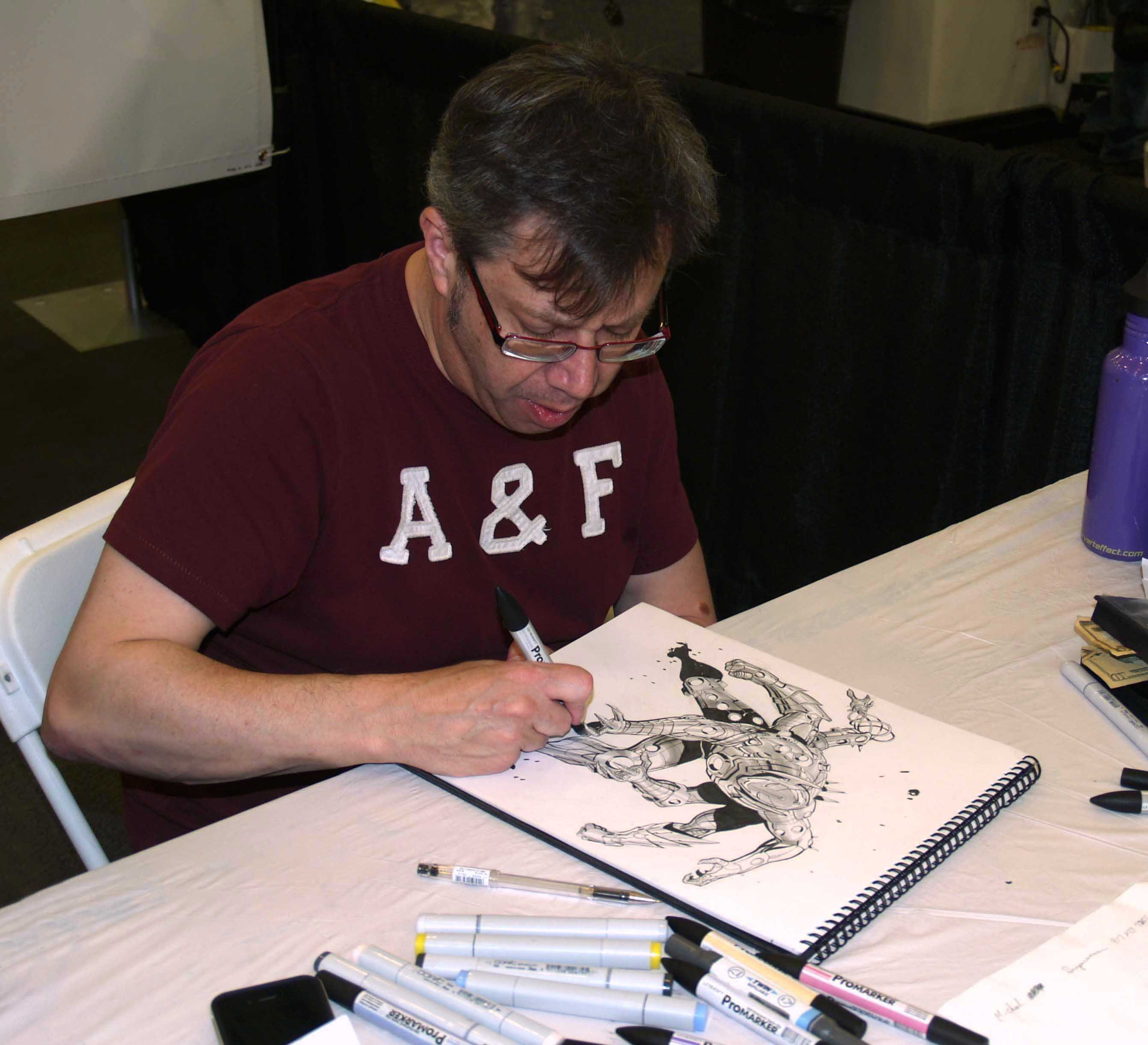
Carlos Pacheco sketching a six-armed version of Ultron.

=== Age of Ultron ===
An alternate universe version of Ultron appears in Age of Ultron. This version successfully conquered Earth and killed most of its superheroes. The heroes initially attempt to erase this Ultron from history completely by having Wolverine and the Invisible Woman go back in time and kill Hank Pym before he can create Ultron, but when this plan results in a worse timeline, an older Wolverine goes back to warn his younger self. Instead, Pym is convinced to add a secret back door in Ultron's programming that will allow Ultron to be shut down.

=== "Death of The Invisible Woman" ===
The Fantastic Four storyline "Death of The Invisible Woman" features an advanced humanoid called Alex Ultron, a member of the futuristic Last Defenders.

=== Deathlok-dominated future ===
An alternate universe version of Ultron who took control of the Deathloks and took the name Deathlok Prime appears in Savage Avengers.

=== Earth-110 ===
In the Earth-110 reality, Ultron assisted Doctor Doom, Hulk, Magneto, Namor, and Red Skull in taking over Manhattan.

=== Earth-10943 ===
An alternate universe version of Ultron from Earth-10943 appears in Avengers (vol. 4).

=== Galactus: Dawn of the Heralds ===
In an alternate universe, the Silver Surfer used the remnants of Ultron to resurrect Galactus, creating a fusion of Ultron and Galactus.

=== Heroes Reborn (2021) ===
An alternate universe version of Ultron appears in Heroes Reborn.

=== Marvel Adventures ===
An alternate universe version of Ultron from Earth-20051 appears in Marvel Adventures. This version is a "neural network" that commands part of the United States defense forces.

=== Old Man Logan ===
A heroic alternate universe version of Ultron appears in Old Man Logan. This version is the loving husband of Spider-Man's youngest daughter Tonya and the stepfather of Ashley, whose villainy he disapproves of.

=== MC2 ===
An alternate universe version of Ultron from Earth-982 named Ultron Extreme appears in Avengers Next.

=== Secret Wars (2015) ===
An alternate universe version of Ultron from Battleworld appears in Secret Wars.

=== The Last Avengers Story ===
An alternate universe version of Ultron known as Ultron-59 appears in The Last Avengers Story.

=== Ultimate Marvel ===
An alternate universe version of Ultron from Earth-1610 appears in Ultimate Marvel. This version is initially part of a group of heroic sentries created by Hank Pym before turning against them.

=== Ultron Forever ===
An alternate timeline version of Ultron who successfully conquered Earth and Asgard appears in Original Sin.

=== What If? ===
Ultron is featured in several What If comics. In the alternate universe of What If? Astonishing X-Men, the Danger Room obtains a body of her own and betrays the X-Men. She eventually marries Ultron, with the two going on to conquer the universe together.

== In other media ==
=== Television ===
Ultron as depicted in The Avengers: Earth's Mightiest Heroes.

- Ultron appears in The Avengers: United They Stand, voiced by John Stocker.
- Ultron makes a non-speaking cameo appearance in The Super Hero Squad Show episode "So Pretty When They Explode!".
- Ultron appears in The Avengers: Earth's Mightiest Heroes, voiced by Tom Kane. This version is based on the mind of Hank Pym and was originally designed to guard and rehabilitate prisoners in the Big House before turning on the Avengers.
- Ultron appears in Avengers Assemble, voiced by Jim Meskimen primarily and by Fred Tatasciore in the episode "Spectrums". This version hijacked Arsenal and posed as Truman Marsh while opposing the Avengers.
- Ultron appears in Marvel Disk Wars: The Avengers, voiced by Takumi Yamazaki in Japanese and Grant George in English.
- Ultron appears in Lego Marvel Super Heroes: Avengers Reassembled, voiced again by Jim Meskimen.
- Ultron appears in Marvel Super Hero Adventures, voiced by Michael Dobson.
- Ultron appears in Lego Marvel Avengers: Time Twisted, voiced again by Michael Dobson.
- Ultron appears in Iron Man and His Awesome Friends, voiced by Tony Hale.

=== Film ===
Ultron appears in Next Avengers: Heroes of Tomorrow, voiced by Tom Kane. This version was created by Tony Stark and killed most of the Avengers. Years afterward, Ultron is defeated by the Avengers' children and the Hulk.

=== Marvel Cinematic Universe ===
A promotional poster of Ultron for Avengers: Age of Ultron (2015)

Ultron appears in media set in the Marvel Cinematic Universe (MCU), with the main version portrayed by James Spader through voice and motion capture, and alternate universe variants voiced by Ross Marquand.

- He first appears in Avengers: Age of Ultron (2015), and returns in both robot and human forms in VisionQuest (2026).
- An alternate universe variant called Infinity Ultron appears in What If...?. This version transferred his consciousness into the Vision's body, launched a nuclear holocaust that wiped out humanity, and seized all six Infinity Stones, attempting to use them to eradicate all life in the multiverse before being stopped by the Watcher and the Guardians of the Multiverse.
- Alternate universe variants of the Ultron Sentries appear in Doctor Strange in the Multiverse of Madness as servants of the Illuminati of Earth-838.

=== Video games ===
- Ultron appears in Captain America and the Avengers.
- Ultron appears as a boss in Marvel: Ultimate Alliance, voiced by James Horan. This version is a member of Doctor Doom's Masters of Evil.
- Ultron appears in Marvel Super Hero Squad Online, voiced by Tom Kenny.
- Ultron appears as a boss in Marvel: Avengers Alliance.
- Ultron appears as a boss in Marvel Puzzle Quest.
- Ultron appears as a boss and playable character in Marvel: Contest of Champions. Additionally, the MCU incarnation appears as an alternate skin while Ultron Sentries appear as non-playable characters.
- Ultron appears as a boss and playable character in Marvel Heroes, voiced again by Tom Kane.
- Ultron appears as a boss and playable character in Marvel: Future Fight. Additionally, both the original and MCU incarnations appear as alternate skins.
- The MCU incarnation of Ultron appears as a playable character and figurine in Disney Infinity 3.0, voiced by Jim Meskimen.
- The MCU incarnation of Ultron appears as the final boss and a playable character in Lego Marvel's Avengers. Additionally, Ultron Sentries also appear as playable characters.
- Ultron appears as a playable character in Marvel vs. Capcom: Infinite, voiced again by Jim Meskimen. This version uses the Space and Reality Stones to merge with the reploid Sigma to become "Ultron Sigma".
- Ultron appears in Marvel Powers United VR, voiced again by Jim Meskimen.
- Ultron appears as a boss in Marvel Ultimate Alliance 3: The Black Order, voiced again by Jim Meskimen.
- Ultron appears in Marvel Dimension of Heroes, voiced again by Jim Meskimen.
- Two incarnations of Ultron appear in Marvel Future Revolution.
- Ultron appears as a playable character in Marvel Rivals.
