= Gargantua (comics) =

- Gargantua as depicted in The Defenders: Strange Heroes #1 (December 2011). Art by Gus Vazquez.

Publication information
- Publisher: Marvel Comics
- First appearance: The New Defenders #126 (December 1983)
- Created by: Alan Kupperberg; J.M. DeMatteis

In-story information
- Full name: Edward Cobert
- Species: Human mutate
- Team affiliations: S.H.I.E.L.D. Secret Empire; Masters of Evil
- Notable aliases: Leviathan
- Abilities: (As Edward Cobert): Expert biochemist; (As Gargantua): Superhuman strength and durability; Large size

Gargantua (Edward Cobert; initially known as Leviathan) is a fictional character appearing in American comic books published by Marvel Comics.

== Publication history ==
Gargantua first appeared in The New Defenders #126 (December 1983), and was created by writer J. M. DeMatteis and artist Alan Kupperberg.

== Fictional character biography ==
Edward Cobert is initially a scientist working for S.H.I.E.L.D. He experiments on himself as part of a project called Project: Lazarus, irreversibly transforming him into a form with heightened size but limited intelligence. Dubbed Leviathan, Cobert battles S.H.I.E.L.D. before being subdued. He later escapes prison and battles the Defenders on multiple occasions.

Edward Cobert is manipulated by the Mad Thinker, who gives him the new alias of Gargantua. The Mad Thinker has Gargantua publicly battle Wasp and Wonder Man, who are involved in protests against proposed superhero registration. Wasp and Wonder Man defeat Gargantua, which helps sway the public's opinion against legislation.

Gargantua joins Doctor Octopus' Masters of Evil, who intend to attack Avengers Mansion in the Avengers' absence. The Masters of Evil are thwarted by the Guardians of the Galaxy and disband.

Gargantua appears in JLA/Avengers as one of many villains who are brainwashed by Krona and forced to defend his stronghold.

During the "Avengers: Standoff!" storyline, Gargantua appears as an inmate of Pleasant Hill, a gated community established by S.H.I.E.L.D.

== Powers and abilities ==
Edward Cobert gained superpowers after subjecting himself to artificial cellular enhancement, giving him enhanced strength and size. He can grow in stature and power by drawing mass from an unknown source. Gargantua's default height is approximately 20–25 feet (6–8 m). He has severely limited intelligence as a side effect of his mutation.

Edward Cobert was a S.H.I.E.L.D. Academy graduate and earned a Ph.D. in biochemistry before his transformation.
