= Heatstroke (disambiguation) =

Heat stroke or heatstroke, is a severe heat illness.

Heatstroke may also refer to:

- "Heatstroke" (song), a 2017 song by Calvin Harris
- Heat illness

== See also ==
- Sunstroke (disambiguation)
