= Karla Sofen =

- Karla Sofen as Moonstone. Art by Simone Bianchi.

Publication information
- Publisher: Marvel Comics
- First appearance: As Karla Sofen: Captain America #192 (December 1975); As Moonstone: The Incredible Hulk (vol. 2) #228 (October 1978); As Meteorite: The Incredible Hulk (vol. 2) #449 (January 1997); As Ms. Marvel: Dark Avengers #1 (March 2009)
- Created by: Marv Wolfman (writer); Frank Robbins (artist)

In-story information
- Species: Human mutate
- Team affiliations: Dark Avengers; Thunderbolts; Masters of Evil; The Corporation
- Notable aliases: Moonstone; Meteorite; Ms. Marvel
- Abilities: Superhuman strength, speed, stamina and reflexes; Minor molecular control; Gravity manipulation; Photogenesis; Photon blasts; Intangibility; Flight; Expert psychologist

Dr. Karla Sofen (also known as Moonstone, Meteorite, and Ms. Marvel) is a character appearing in American comic books published by Marvel Comics. She first appeared in Captain America #192 (December 1975), created by writer Marv Wolfman and artist Frank Robbins.

Moonstone is a former psychologist who received her powers from a fusion with a gravity stone designed by the alien Kree. The character has been depicted as both a supervillain and an anti-hero at various times in her publication history. She was a member of the Masters of Evil, Thunderbolts and the Dark Avengers, and in the latter group she temporally replaced Carol Danvers as Ms. Marvel.

Moonstone has been described as one of Marvel's most notable and powerful female supervillains.

== Publication history ==
The character first appeared as a gun moll of the villain Doctor Faustus in Captain America #192 (December 1975). She later appeared in issue #228 of The Incredible Hulk where it was revealed that she was the psychiatrist of the former Moonstone, Lloyd Bloch, and that she tricked him into relinquishing the moonstone to her. She was later revealed to be a member of the shadowy organization known as the Corporation.

She appeared in Avengers as part of the supervillain team the Masters of Evil. During the disappearance of the Avengers and the Fantastic Four (after the Onslaught crossover), the Masters of Evil, Moonstone (as Meteorite) included, posed as the new hero team called the Thunderbolts. After 12 issues, their true identities were exposed. Moonstone returned to the Thunderbolts series in 2007's Thunderbolts #110, as the team's new field leader.

Moonstone was one of the Thunderbolts' characters that Brian Michael Bendis moved over to the Dark Avengers, where she took on the identity of Ms. Marvel, and she became the main character in the Ms. Marvel solo title in issue #38. She appeared as a regular character in the Dark Avengers series from issue #1 (March 2009) through issue #16 (June 2010).

Moonstone returned to the Thunderbolts in issue #144, after the Dark Reign era. She became part of a government program led by Luke Cage to reform villains. Joining them was Juggernaut, Ghost, Crossbones, and Man-Thing. She remained with the team after the title transitioned into Dark Avengers beginning with issue #175.

Moonstone was also a member of the third Thunderbolts team, which was relaunched as part of the aftermath of Avengers: Standoff!. It was written by Jim Zub and drawn by Jon Malin, the team consists of Moonstone, the Winter Soldier, Fixer, Atlas, and MACH-V. The comic was cancelled after twelve issues due to the Secret Empire event.

== Fictional character biography ==
=== Origins ===
Karla Sofen was born in Van Nuys, California. She grew up in the mansion of Hollywood producer Charles Stockbridge, as the child of the butler Karl Sofen. After her father's death, her mother Marion Sofen worked three jobs to put her daughter through college, and Karla vowed never to end up like her mother and that she would never put another's needs before her own. Despite building a successful practice as a psychologist and psychiatrist, Karla so disliked being dependent on her patients for income that she entered the super-criminal world as an aide to Doctor Faustus. Learning of Lloyd Bloch (a.k.a. the original Moonstone), she became the supervillain's psychologist and manipulated him into rejecting the source of his powers, an extraterrestrial gem of considerable power, which she then acquired and absorbed to gain the powers of Moonstone.

Sofen murdered her mother by suffocating her and then set her house on fire. It has also been said that during Sofen's career as a psychologist, she convinced depressed patients to kill themselves while she watched, and was "instrumental in the therapeutic hospitalization of six more".

=== Masters of Evil ===
Egghead recruits Moonstone into the third Masters of Evil, who battle the Avengers. However, her tenure is short-lived as she surrenders after the Masters of Evil's defeat.

Later, Helmut Zemo recruited Moonstone for the fourth Masters of Evil. She participated in the Masters of Evil's takeover of Avengers Mansion, but attempted to manipulate the mentally damaged Blackout to her side to take position of team leader from Zemo. She subsequently battled Captain Marvel, but this confrontation ended with her being temporarily paralyzed when she crashed into a cliff during the fight and broke her neck. Healed by the power of the stone, she then had a rematch with Captain Marvel.

=== Thunderbolts ===
When Baron Zemo formed a group of villains to masquerade as heroes, Sofen was broken out of the Vault and she reluctantly returned to villainy as Meteorite, a member of the Thunderbolts.

Upon encountering a young victim of Arnim Zola's genetic manipulations, a youngster by the name of Jolt, Meteorite nudges Zemo into accepting her in the team. Moonstone becomes a mother figure to Jolt and creates a power-base inside the team, rallying the others behind her. Zemo exposes the true nature of the team, but Sofen opposes Zemo, followed by MACH-1, Songbird, and Jolt.

Over time, Moonstone is haunted by nightmares of an ancient Kree warrior. After investigating, Moonstone travels to the moon, where she meets with the Supreme Intelligence. The Supreme Intelligence reveals to her that the fragment she referred to as the "moonstone" was part of a Kree Lifestone, which was used to empower the Guardians of the Galaxy centuries ago. Ajes'ha, the Kree warrior, was the previous owner of the moonstone, whose memory was etched into it and kept steering Moonstone to do good. Led by Captain Marvel, the Thunderbolts travel to Titan, where Mentor and ISAAC attempt to remove the moonstone from Moonstone's body. After a serious discussion about Moonstone's potential to do good, Mentor allows her to keep the gem, but erases the memory of Ajes'ha, leaving Moonstone's mind and decisions to herself.

=== Uncertain loyalties ===
Karla Sofen is contacted by Graviton, who hires her as a tutor. In the following weeks, Moonstone helps Graviton understand and control his powers in ways he had not even dreamed, making him fall in love with her. The Thunderbolts reform to stop Graviton, only to find Moonstone at his side. In the end, she helps them stop Graviton. His power implodes, however, sending the Thunderbolts to Counter-Earth. Moonstone takes a second moonstone from Counter-Earth's Lloyd Bloch, increasing her own powers.

=== Return ===
Moonstone becomes the field leader of the revamped Thunderbolts, sponsored by the government. During the "Secret Invasion" storyline, Moonstone is among four Thunderbolts members attacked by Khn'nr, a renegade Skrull who impersonated Captain Marvel, but has refused to follow programming and has pledged to defend the human race. During the battle, Khn'nr reveals that Moonstone's stone is of Kree origin and uses energy-controlling abilities to shut it down. When the Thunderbolts attack and board a Skrull ship, Swordsman confronts a group of Skrulls with the newly returned Andrea von Strucker. Moonstone immobilizes Swordsman and suggests an alliance to the Skrulls and Andrea. Andrea turns out not to be a Skrull, however, and attacks Moonstone, although Bullseye kills Andrea from behind.

=== Dark Reign ===
Moonstone as Ms. Marvel. Variant cover to Dark Avengers #2. Art by Mike Choi.

Norman Osborn approaches Moonstone as she is meditating and offers her a spot on the Dark Avengers, giving her the costume and codename of Ms. Marvel. After defeating Morgan le Fay, Moonstone flirts with Noh-Varr, and then eventually seduces and sleeps with him. While watching a televised interview that Osborn is conducting, Sofen tells Noh-Varr that the Dark Avengers are all criminals. This prompts Noh-Varr to leave the group.

As Sofen takes on the Ms. Marvel mantle, she goes out patrolling and comes across some men robbing an armored car. After killing the men, Sofen goes back to the Avengers Tower, where Osborn informs her the Dark Avengers all have to undergo psychiatric evaluations and wants her to go first, wanting her professional opinion of Gerald Wright's skills. Wright turns out to be a psychic who wanted to kill the Dark Avengers for finding out they were criminals.

After being told by Osborn to find Advanced Idea Mechanics (A.I.M.), Sofen sorts through the original Ms. Marvel's A.I.M. leads and takes out an A.I.M. cell in Atlanta, Georgia. There she finds baby M.O.D.O.C.'s, enhanced to warp reality. They communicate with her telepathically, telling her that they need Ms. Marvel to save them. It is unclear if they are controlling her, or if she genuinely cares about them, but Sofen takes them to Avengers Tower for safe keeping. Almost immediately, her room is blown apart by a strange yellow being. The babies are moved to Thunderbolts Mountain, where they are stolen by Deadpool on behalf of A.I.M.

Trying to save the babies, Sofen is too late to reach them as Spider-Man hooks them up to a machine. The four mysterious beings then merge and reform the original Ms. Marvel (Carol Danvers). During their battle, Danvers removes the moonstone from Sofen, depowering her in the process. Knowing that Sofen will die in 72 hours without the moonstone's support, Danvers hides the moonstone at the grave of Sofen's mother and gives her the opportunity to reexamine her life and stand against Osborn. Sofen finds the moonstone at her mother's grave and retakes in a fury, smashing the headstone.

=== Return to the Thunderbolts ===
Moonstone rejoins the Thunderbolts under Luke Cage's leadership. Following the events of Avengers: Standoff!, Moonstone briefly joins Winter Soldier's Thunderbolts to prevent S.H.I.E.L.D. from continuing the Kobik project.

In the storyline "One World Under Doom", Moonstone is among the original Thunderbolts members who join the Fulgar Victoris led by Valentina Allegra de Fontaine. Moonstone later becomes warden of the Vault.

== Powers and abilities ==
Moonstone's powers derive from a Kree gravity stone (found on Earth's moon), charged with unknown energy and bonded to her nervous system.

She can use the stone to fly, and to become intangible to pass through solid objects (while intangible she is immune to some magic-based attacks). She can project laser-like energy beams from her hands (able to penetrate steel plates), and has shown the ability to discharge non-coherent light in a blinding flash. Additionally, her bond with the stone grants her superhuman strength, stamina, speed and reflexes, as well as enhanced healing sufficient to recover her from a broken neck with enough time.

During the period when Moonstone had absorbed a second gravity stone, she displayed the ability to control gravitational forces, enabling her to move and manipulate matter, to create force fields, to increase gravity around a target and crush it, to generate miniature black holes, and even transport objects through dimensional rifts. Moonstone is vulnerable to astrally-projected beings and energy forms even while in her intangible state. It has been revealed that Moonstone's gravity stone is connected to her own life-force; if she were separated from it for more than 72 hours, she would die.

In addition to these powers, Karla Sofen has extensive knowledge of psychology and psychiatry, and has an M.D., specializing in psychiatry. She often uses this expertise to manipulate those around her for personal gain. However, she has occasionally shown to not be as skilled as she likes to believe, resulting in her being outmanipulated by more experienced opponents.

== Reception ==
=== Critical reception ===
Gavin Jasper of Den of Geek stated, "With Dark Avengers being the antithesis of early Thunderbolts, you have Karla Sofen as the common factor, existing on both teams. Moonstone, branding herself as Ms. Marvel during this series, is a really fascinating character. She's a self-serving master manipulator who lacks megalomaniacal goals. Sure, she's interested in great power, but doesn't care for the great responsibility that comes with it. She doesn't want to rule the world because it's simply too much work. She'd rather take advantage of people for her own personal gain as long as possible until it's time for her to move on." Peter Eckhardt of CBR.com wrote, "Though a master manipulator like the Enchantress, Sofen holds little goals beyond gaining more personal power and status. Moonstone is powerful, cruel, and a critical component of many versions of the team. Her desire for power, her ability to gain it, and her generally evil nature are what put her in the Masters of Evil Hall of Fame." Xandra Harbet of Lopper said, "Every badass heroine needs a proper female villain, and Moonstone, also known as Dr. Karla Sofen, is one of the best around. The former psychologist first appears in the Captain America comics in 1975, later snaking her way into the lives of multiple Marvel heroes. She eventually finds herself wreaking havoc on Captain Marvel's life, solidifying herself as one of Carol's greatest foes." Philip Etemesi of Screen Rant asserted, "Sofen has an incredible run as both a main villain and henchwoman. During her stints as a member Baron Zemo's Masters of Evil and Norman Osborne's Thunderbolts, she is shown to be the most competent baddie, almost defeating the Avengers on several occasions. And she gets to have her own mind-blowing schemes too, such as when she takes over a health facility to work on a drug to raise the dead."

=== Accolades ===
- In 2009, IGN included Karla Sofen's Ms. Marvel persona in their "Marvel's Femme Fatales" list.
- In 2018, CBR.com ranked Moonstone 4th in their "Dark Avengers: The 15 Most Powerful Members" list.
- In 2019, CBR.com ranked Moonstone 4th in their "20 Powerful Female Marvel Characters We Hope To See In The MCU's Phase Four" list, 5th in their "10 Iconic Villains" list, and 7th in their "All Of The Dark Avengers, Ranked" list.
- In 2020, Scary Mommy included Moonstone in their "Looking For A Role Model? These 195+ Marvel Female Characters Are Truly Heroic" list.
- In 2021, Screen Rant included Moonstone in their "Hawkeye's 10 Best Relationships In Marvel Comics" list.
- In 2021, Sideshow included Moonstone in their "Five Characters We Want To Debut In The Falcon And The Winter Soldier" list.
- In 2022, CBR.com ranked Moonstone 1st in their "10 Marvel Villains Who Need Their Own Comic" list, 2nd in their "The 10 Best Masters Of Evil Members" list, 6th in their "Marvel: The 10 Strongest Female Villains" list, and 7th in their "Thunderbolts' 10 Best Leaders" list.
- In 2022, Screen Rant ranked Moonstone 4th in their "Main Comic Book Villains Ranked Lamest To Coolest" list, 6th in their "10 Most Powerful Variants Of Ms. Marvel" list, and included her in their "10 Best Doctors In Marvel Comics list, and in their"10 Best Captain Marvel Comics Characters Not In The MCU" list.

== Other versions ==
=== Marvel Zombies ===
An alternate universe version of Karla Sofen / Meteorite appears in Marvel Zombies: Dead Days, where she is killed by Thor.

=== Old Man Hawkeye ===
An alternate universe version of Karla Sofen / Moonstone appears in Old Man Hawkeye. This version is a member of the Thunderbolts who betrayed and killed the Avengers. Following a disagreement with Baron Zemo, Moonstone hides in the Canadian Rockies. 45 years later, she is met by Hawkeye and Kate Bishop in a village where she has been worshipped for her immense power, with her body severely decayed by the alien artifact that is the source of her powers. Moonstone attempts to kill the Hawkeyes, but they manage to overload her moonstone, causing it to explode and kill her and her followers.

== In other media ==
=== Television ===
- Karla Sofen as Moonstone appears in The Avengers: United They Stand episode "Command Decision", voiced by Susan Roman. This version is a member of Helmut Zemo's Masters of Evil.
- Karla Sofen appears in Avengers Assemble, voiced by Elizabeth Daily. This version initially operates as Moonstone of the Masters of Evil before becoming Meteorite of the Thunderbolts.

=== Video games ===
- Karla Sofen as Moonstone appears in Marvel: Ultimate Alliance 2, voiced by Tessa Auberjonois.
- Karla Sofen as Moonstone appears as a boss and unlockable playable character in Marvel: Avengers Alliance.
- Karla Sofen as Moonstone appears as a playable character in Marvel Puzzle Quest.
- Karla Sofen as Meteorite and Moonstone appears as a playable character in Lego Marvel's Avengers via the "Thunderbolts" and "Marvel's Women of Power" DLCs respectively.
- Karla Sofen as Moonstone appears as a playable character in Marvel Future Fight.
