= Man-Killer =

Fictional comic book villain

- Katrina Luisa Van Horn as Man-Killer. Art by Jim Mooney and Gerry Conway.

Publication information
- Publisher: Marvel Comics
- First appearance: Robot: Captain America #111 (December 1968); Katrina Luisa Van Horn: Marvel Team-Up #8 (April 1973)
- Created by: Robot: Stan Lee; Jim Steranko; Katrina Luisa Van Horn: Jim Mooney; Gerry Conway

In-story information
- Alter ego: Katrina Luisa Van Horn
- Species: Human mutate-cyborg
- Team affiliations: Robot: Hydra; Katrina Luisa Van Horn: Hydra; Advanced Idea Mechanics; Masters of Evil; Thunderbolts
- Notable aliases: Katrina Luisa Van Horn: Amazon, Wilma
- Abilities: Katrina Luisa Van Horn: Superhuman strength and durability, and size-alteration through Pym Particle exposure

Man-Killer is a name used by two supervillains appearing in American comic books published by Marvel Comics. The second version, Katrina Luisa Van Horn, has been viewed by critics as a "caricature of feminists, who despised all men."

== Publication history ==
The first version of Man-Killer first appeared in Captain America #111 (December 1968) and was created by Stan Lee and Jim Steranko.

Man-Killer first appeared in Marvel Team-Up #8 (April 1973) and was created by Gerry Conway and Jim Mooney. The character subsequently appeared in Daredevil #121 (May 1975), #123 (July 1975), Iron Man #126-127 (September–October 1979), and Marvel Team-Up #107 (July 1981), where she seemingly died. The character appeared several years later in Web of Spider-Man Annual #3 (1987), and made several appearances in the series Thunderbolts (1997-2000), eventually joining the titular group. Man-Killer received an entry in the Official Handbook of the Marvel Universe A-Z 2006 #7.

== Fictional character biography ==
=== Robot ===
Man-Killer is a robotic assassin who was sent by Madame Hydra to kill Captain America. It is ultimately defeated and destroyed.

=== Katrina Luisa Van Horn ===
Katrina Luisa Van Horn was an Olympic skier and is a militant feminist. After engaging in an argument with anti-Women's Liberation skier Karl Lubbings, the two took their disagreement to the slopes. Katrina was an Olympic-level skier, but Lubbings cut her off and both skiers plunged off the mountain. Katrina was severely injured and disfigured. She was fitted with a powered exoskeleton and took the name Man-Killer. She has worked freelance and as an agent for Hydra.

Man-Killer has been a member of Crimson Cowl's incarnation of the Masters of Evil. Some time later, Erik Josten (Atlas of the Thunderbolts) finds Man-Killer working as a bartender in his team's adopted home of Burton Canyon, Colorado. When Josten becomes a regular at the bar, Man-Killer is congenial towards him, pretending not to recognize him as Atlas.

As Amazon, she was briefly a member of the Thunderbolts under Hawkeye.

Man-Killer later appears as part of Helmut Zemo's third incarnation of the Masters of Evil. During a battle with the Thunderbolts, Man-Killer is killed by Kobik.

== Powers and abilities ==
The Katrina Van Horn version of Man-Killer was given robotic implants replacing or compounded with bones and nerves, which give her superhuman powers, good athletic abilities, and the ability to throw knives at a range of hundreds of meters. She was also given Pym particles to grow in strength proportionate to size.

== In other media ==
The robot version of Man-Killer appears in the Avengers Assemble episode "New Year's Resolution". This version is a time-traveling assassin working for Kang the Conqueror.
