= Scorcher (character) =

Marvel Comics supervillain

Scorcher is the name of two characters appearing in comic books published by Marvel Comics.

== Publication history ==
The Steven Hudak incarnation of Scorcher first appeared in Untold Tales of Spider-Man #1 (September 1995), and was created by Kurt Busiek and Pat Olliffe.

The Sarah Garza incarnation of Scorcher first appeared in Secret Avengers vol. 2 #10 (October 2013), and was created by Ed Brisson and Luke Ross.

== Fictional character biography ==
=== Steven Hudak ===
Steven Hudak

Publication information
- Publisher: Marvel Comics
- First appearance: Untold Tales of Spider-Man #1 (September 1995)
- Created by: Kurt Busiek; Pat Olliffe

In-story information
- Alter ego: Steven Hudak
- Species: Human
- Team affiliations: Masters of Evil; Sinister Sixteen
- Abilities: Insulated battlesuit grants: Flamethrowers; Protection from heat, flame and physical injuries Flight via jet pack

Steven Hudak is a research chemist who was wrongfully accused of embezzlement by his employer. Swearing revenge, he creates an armored suit containing flame-throwing equipment and assumes the alias Scorcher, attacking his former place of employment. Hudak is thwarted by Spider-Man. It is later revealed that Hudak had been an agent of Norman Osborn. Hudak eventually escapes prison to pursue an arson career but was defeated by Spider-Man a second time.

When Matt Murdock's identity as Daredevil is publicly revealed, Hudak and Diamondback confront Murdock, but are driven off by Daredevil and Spider-Man. Scorcher encounters Daredevil again in the series Secret War, where he is forced by Lucia von Bardas to attack S.H.I.E.L.D.'s headquarters.

During the Dark Reign storyline, Scorcher, Living Laser, Griffin, and Razor Fist are sent by the Hood to retrieve Tigra and Gauntlet after they flee from Osborn. They attack the heroes, who are ultimately saved by Counter Force.

Boomerang and Owl hire Scorcher onto the Sinister Sixteen, assembled to distract the Chameleon's forces while Boomerang steals.

=== Sarah Garza ===
Sarah Garza

Publication information
- Publisher: Marvel Comics
- First appearance: Secret Avengers (vol. 2) #10 (October 2013)
- Created by: Ed Brisson; Luke Ross

In-story information
- Alter ego: Sarah Garza
- Species: Inhuman
- Team affiliations: Secret Avengers
- Notable aliases: Iron Patriot
- Abilities: Plasma energy generation Insulated battlesuit grants: Protection from physical injuries Ability to regulate and project her energy

Sarah Garza is an agent of S.H.I.E.L.D. from Park Slope, Brooklyn and one of the many latent Inhumans whose powers were activated by Black Bolt's Terrigen Mist bomb. She is a rookie member of the black ops superhero team, the Secret Avengers, and uses her abilities against Thanos's forces as well as the Junkman's technopathic abilities. She resigns after seeing how violent her abilities are in combat, and is placed in confinement until she learns to control her powers and return to her old job as a technician. Garza is later seen alongside fellow Inhumans Daisy Johnson and Synapse.

== Powers and abilities ==
Steven Hudak's suit was inspired by his flame-throwing equipment, which allows him to produce large quantities of fire under his control. His Scorcher costume protects him against heat and flame, and other injuries. Later, he added a jet pack to his armor, enabling him to fly and hover in place.

Sarah Garza can generate plasma energy, but cannot naturally control the direction of release and must use a suit of armor to do so.

== In other media ==
- The Steven Hudak incarnation of Scorcher appears as a mini-boss in Marvel: Ultimate Alliance 2, voiced by Keith Ferguson.
- The Sarah Garza incarnation of Scorcher appears in Marvel's Avengers, voiced by Anna Graves.
