= Graviton (character) =

Marvel Comics fictional character

- Graviton as depicted in Thunderbolts #17 (Aug. 1998). Art by Mark Bagley.

Publication information
- Publisher: Marvel Comics
- First appearance: The Avengers #158 (April 1977)
- Created by: Jim Shooter (writer); Sal Buscema (artist)

In-story information
- Alter ego: Franklin Hall; Adaptations: Ian Quinn; Ruby Hale; Glenn Talbot
- Species: Human mutate
- Team affiliations: A.I.M. Army of Evil; Masters of Evil West Coast
- Notable aliases: Master of the Fundamental Force
- Abilities: Gravity manipulation; High intelligence

Graviton (Franklin Hall) is a supervillain appearing in American comic books published by Marvel Comics. Created by writer Jim Shooter and artist Sal Buscema, he first appeared in The Avengers #158, dated April 1977. Over the years, he has mainly opposed the Avengers in their various incarnations.

Originally a gravity researcher, Franklin Hall gains the ability to control gravity. Corrupted by this power, he becomes a supervillain using the name "Graviton". He is confronted and defeated by the Avengers as he tried to destroy the facility where he did his original research. In subsequent appearances, Graviton seems to struggle with control of his powers and often loses because of this. More than one storyline has depicted Graviton's apparent death, only for him to return subsequently through various means. He later becomes part of Advanced Idea Mechanics' High Council as Minister of Science.

Graviton has appeared in Marvel television series, such as The Avengers: Earth's Mightiest Heroes, voiced by Fred Tatasciore. Additionally, Franklin Hall appeared in the Marvel Cinematic Universe (MCU) television series Agents of S.H.I.E.L.D., portrayed by Ian Hart, while the Graviton identity is filled by Glenn Talbot, portrayed by Adrian Pasdar.

== Publication history ==
Graviton first appeared in The Avengers #158 (April 1977) and was created by Jim Shooter and Sal Buscema.

== Fictional character biography ==
Franklin Hall is a Canadian physicist involved in an experiment in a private research facility in the Canadian Rockies. A mistake in Hall's calculations imbues him with graviton particles, which give him the ability to manipulate gravity. Hall at first tries to hide his newfound ability, but becomes tempted by the potential power, becoming the villain Graviton.

When Graviton takes over the research facility and forbids all communications with the outside world, a fellow scientist sends a distress signal to the Avengers. Graviton lifts the facility thousands of feet into the sky and threatens to kill the scientist. The Avengers arrive and attack, but are trapped in a gravity field. Graviton brings the facility to New York and demands the United Nations to hand over world power or he will destroy the world's cities. Thor and Black Panther, having been on leave from the Avengers, learn of these events and manage to free the Avengers. Graviton defeats the Avengers again, but is tricked into thinking a fellow scientist he cares for has committed suicide. Graviton panics and causes the facility to collapse on him, forming a giant stone sphere that is dropped into a river by the Avengers.

Graviton later reappears, although is suffering from amnesia and is flickering in and out of existence. Somehow guided to the female scientist he has feelings for, Graviton attempts to abduct her but is stopped by the Thing and Black Bolt. During the battle, Graviton describes himself as becoming a "living black hole" and morphs into a colossal humanoid. Graviton is attacked until he loses concentration, implodes, and is presumed dead.

Graviton is revealed to have survived, but is continually banished from Earth by the Avengers. Graviton is driven insane by his constant defeats and exile from Earth, and returns with the goal of total world conquest. He is accompanied by M'reel, an alien belonging to the P'tah species. Seeking revenge on the Thunderbolts, Graviton storms their headquarters, only to discover that the Thunderbolts have disbanded and been replaced by the Redeemers. Graviton nearly kills the entire team before being defeated by the reassembled Thunderbolts. After discovering that M'reel intended to have the P'tah invade Earth, Graviton apparently dies stopping the alien invasion and saves the Thunderbolts.

Under unrevealed circumstances, Graviton returns to Earth once more and is rendered powerless long enough to be imprisoned on the Raft. When Electro shorts out the Raft's defenses to free Sauron, Graviton and dozens of other inmates escape, but are confronted by the New Avengers. Graviton is recaptured and sustains a head injury that dampens his powers.

Graviton battles Iron Man, having been framed for murder by an associate of the Mandarin who possessed similar gravity-manipulating powers to his own. He uses his powers to trigger a fatal aneurysm in his brain, concluding that he will never receive a fair trial and wanting to end things on his terms. Graviton appears alive as part of the new High Council of Advanced Idea Mechanics, serving as the group's Minister of Science.

== Powers and abilities ==
Franklin Hall was a normal human until empowered by an explosion that intermingled his molecules with sub-nuclear graviton particles generated by a nearby particle generator, which gave him the ability to manipulate gravity. He can immobilize others by increasing their gravity, levitate himself by lowering his own gravity, and generate concussive energy blasts. Graviton's abilities are potent enough to move islands and reshape mountains.

== In other media ==
=== Television ===
Ian Hart as Dr. Franklin Hall in Agents of S.H.I.E.L.D.

Adrian Pasdar as Glenn Talbot / Graviton as seen in Agents of S.H.I.E.L.D.

- Graviton appears in The Avengers: Earth's Mightiest Heroes two-part episode "Breakout", voiced by Fred Tatasciore. This version is a physicist hired by S.H.I.E.L.D. to help recreate the super-soldier serum that created Captain America. However, Hall caused an accident that gave himself near-limitless gravitational powers. Soon after, when it became clear that he had become dangerous, S.H.I.E.L.D. director Nick Fury placed Hall in an unconscious state and imprisoned him in the Raft. A decade later, a technological malfunction enables Hall to escape and seek revenge on Fury, but he is foiled by Thor, the Wasp, Iron Man, the Hulk, and Ant-Man.
- Several characters inspired by Graviton appear in Agents of S.H.I.E.L.D., set in the Marvel Cinematic Universe (MCU).
  - Franklin Hall appears in the first season episode "The Asset", portrayed by Ian Hart. This version is a former colleague of Ian Quinn, who kidnaps him to finish work on a gravity manipulator powered by a gravity-manipulating substance called gravitonium. Believing it is dangerous, Hall attempts to destroy the substance. Phil Coulson tries to save Hall, but the latter is pulled into the gravitonium, where he is trapped. The gravitonium is returned to Quinn, who is later absorbed into it as well.
  - During the fifth season, Ruby Hale (portrayed by Dove Cameron), an agent of Hydra, invades a Hydra facility and infuses herself with gravitonium, seeking to become the "Destroyer of Worlds". However, Hale fails to control her powers and kills one of Hydra's leaders, Werner von Strucker, before she is killed by Elena Rodriguez.
  - Later in the fifth season, S.H.I.E.L.D. is attacked by alien warriors sent by the Confederacy. Glenn Talbot (portrayed by Adrian Pasdar) infuses himself with the remaining gravitonium. He kills the aliens before confronting the Confederacy, who he learns intend to stop Thanos. Becoming increasingly narcissistic and unhinged under the influence of the gravitonium, Talbot attempts to absorb more gravitonium until he is defeated by Daisy Johnson and blasted into space.
- Graviton appears in Marvel Disk Wars: The Avengers, voiced by Mitsuaki Madano in the Japanese version and by Patrick Seitz in the English dub. This version is a member of the Masters of Evil.

=== Film ===
Graviton appears in Avengers Confidential: Black Widow & Punisher.

=== Video games ===
- Graviton appears as a boss in The Amazing Spider-Man 2.
- Graviton appears as a boss in Marvel: Avengers Alliance 2.
