= Puff Adder (character) =

Marvel Comics fictional character

- Puff Adder as seen in Captain America: Sam Wilson #3.

Publication information
- Publisher: Marvel Comics
- First appearance: Captain America #337 (January 1988)
- Created by: Mark Gruenwald; Tom Morgan

In-story information
- Alter ego: Gordon "Gordo" Fraley
- Species: Human mutant
- Team affiliations: Serpent Society; Serpent Squad; Masters of Evil
- Abilities: Experienced aircraft pilot and street fighter; Noxious gas projection via costume's cowl; Slight superhuman strength and stamina; Ability to enlarge, or "puff up," body

Puff Adder (Gordon Fraley) is a character appearing in American comic books published by Marvel Comics. Created by writer Mark Gruenwald and artist Tom Morgan, the character first appeared in Captain America #337 (January 1988). Puff Adder is a mutant, a subspecies of humans born with superhuman abilities. His power allows him to increase his body mass, enabling him to grow up to 10 feet in height and weigh more than five tons. He is a supervillain depicted primarily as a member of the Serpent Society.

== Publication history ==
Gordon Fraley debuted in Captain America #337 (January 1988), and was created by Mark Gruenwald and Tom Morgan. The character was originally intended to appear in Thunderbolts #104 and on the cover of Avengers: The Initiative #1, but was omitted from the artwork in both cases. The Civil War Files #1 and Mighty Avengers #1 later confirmed that he had been recruited into the Initiative off-panel. He subsequently appeared in several Marvel series, including Guardians of the Galaxy (1990), and Captain America: Steve Rogers (2016).

== Fictional character biography ==
Gordon Fraley was born in Atlanta, Georgia. Large and strong but not very bright, Puff Adder is a mutant with the ability to inflate, or "puff", his body, greatly enhancing his strength. As a member of the fourth Serpent Squad, Puff Adder attempts to rob a Las Vegas casino, and battles Captain America, Falcon, Nomad, and D-Man. Puff Adder is inducted into the second incarnation of the Serpent Society as a double agent working for Viper during her invasion of the group.

Puff Adder and Anaconda serve as bailiffs at the Serpent Society's trial of Diamondback. With Anaconda and Rock Python, Puff Adder is sent to Diamondback's apartment to apprehend her. He battles Captain America and seemingly overpowers him. Puff Adder abducts Diamondback, but is attacked by MODAM and thrown from the Serpent Saucer.

As a member of the Masters of Evil, Puff Adder participates in the attempted takeover of the Avengers Mansion while the other heroes are distracted by the events of the Infinity War. There, the team encounters the Guardians of the Galaxy. After a brief fight, both teams are overwhelmed with doppelgängers of themselves created by Magus and Anthropomorpho. Out of necessity, the two teams work together to destroy the clones.

As part of the All-New, All-Different Marvel branding, Puff Adder appears as a member of Viper's Serpent Society under its new name of Serpent Solutions. Puff Adder appears in the 2017 storyline "Secret Empire", where he and the members of Serpent Solutions join Helmut Zemo's army.

During the "Devil's Reign" story line, Puff Adder and Coachwhip appear as members of Mayor Wilson Fisk's Thunderbolts after Fisk outlaws superhero activity. They, alongside the Thunderbolts unit, attack Spider-Woman, who manages to fight them off.

== Powers and abilities ==
Puff Adder possesses the ability to increase his size and mass, generally enlarging to about two and a half times his normal weight and increasing his height by roughly one-third. He can also emit acidic gases through jaw control, which are capable of corroding steel in seconds. In addition, he has been depicted with changing skin and hair color. Within the Serpent Society, Puff Adder is regarded as its most skilled pilot.

== In other media ==
- Puff Adder appears in Captain America: The Winter Soldier - The Official Game.
- In 2023, Hasbro released an action figure of Puff Adder as part of the Marvel Legends action figure line.
