= Jackhammer (comics) =

Fictional comic book character

Publication information
- Publisher: Marvel Comics
- First appearance: Daredevil #123 (July 1975)
- Created by: Jenny Blake Isabella; Bob Brown

In-story information
- Alter ego: Unrevealed
- Species: Human mutate
- Team affiliations: Hydra; Power Tools; Masters of Evil
- Notable aliases: Jackhammer
- Abilities: Superhuman strength, stamina, durability, and reflexes

Jackhammer is a fictional character appearing in American comic books published by Marvel Comics. Created by writer Jenny Blake Isabella and artist Bob Brown, the character first appeared in Daredevil #123 (July 1975). He was an agent and division leader of Hydra during the criminal leadership of Silvermane. He subsequently left Hydra and gained superhuman attributes through a treatment provided by Power Broker, Inc.

== Publication history ==
Jackhammer was first mentioned as a Hydra leader in Daredevil #121; he debuted in Daredevil #123 (July 1975), created by Jenny Blake Isabella and Bob Brown. He later appeared in Captain America #371 (June 1990), #373-378 (July–October 1990), Guardians of the Galaxy #28-29 (September–October 1992), Captain America #412-414 (February–April 1993), Thunderbolts #24-25 (March–April 1999), Union Jack #1-2 (November–December 2006), and Captain America: Sam Wilson #15 (November 2016).

== Fictional character biography ==
Jackhammer is a costumed agent/division leader of Hydra when it was under the leadership of the crime lord Silvermane. When they arrange a kidnapping of Foggy Nelson, Daredevil, Black Widow, and S.H.I.E.L.D. pursue them. Jackhammer is among those who fought Daredevil and is defeated.

Jackhammer later leaves Hydra and gains superhuman strength from a treatment at Power Broker, Inc. He starts a relationship with wrestler Poundcakes, whose rebuff threatens the first date of Captain America and Diamondback. Anaconda and Asp render Jackhammer and Poundcake unconscious.

Dr. Karl Malus of Power Broker, Inc. forms the group Power Tools with Jackhammer and other villains in their plot to capture Battlestar and other characters when they de-powered them. He is among the villains who battle Captain America.

During The Infinity War storyline, Jackhammer leaves Power Tools and joins Doctor Octopus' incarnation of the Masters of Evil. He is among the villains who turn on Doctor Octopus, causing him to flee.

Jackhammer participates in an attack on the Thames Tunnel, threatening many civilians inside. He is swiftly defeated by the superhero Union Jack.

== Powers and abilities ==
Jackhammer is an accomplished engineer and inventor, who wears devices similar to the Shocker's vibro-shock gauntlets. They increase the concussive force of his blows by generating pulsed vibrations on contact. Jackhammer possesses superhuman strength, durability, stamina, and reflexes. He received immense physical attributes due to the Power Broker treatment, but it somewhat diminished his mind.
