= Blackout (Marcus Daniels) =

Marvel Comics supervillain

- Blackout

Publication information
- Publisher: Marvel Comics
- First appearance: Nova #19 (May 1978)
- Created by: Marv Wolfman; Carmine Infantino; Tom Palmer

In-story information
- Alter ego: Marcus Daniels
- Team affiliations: Masters of Evil; Thunderbolts
- Partnerships: Helmut Zemo; Moonstone
- Abilities: Darkforce manipulation Energy blasts Portal creation Flight

Blackout (Marcus Daniels) is a supervillain appearing in American comic books published by Marvel Comics.

Patrick Brennan portrayed the character in two episodes of the first season of Agents of S.H.I.E.L.D.

== Publication history ==
Blackout first appeared in Nova #19 and was created by Marv Wolfman, Carmine Infantino, and Tom Palmer.

== Fictional character biography ==
Marcus Daniels was born in Flushing, Queens, New York City. He works as a laboratory assistant to Abner Croit, a physicist hoping to build a device capable of tapping into energies from other dimensions. Croit looks down on Daniels, making him feel useless. An experiment bathes Daniels in Darkforce energy, giving him the ability to control it. Despite his powers threatening to go out of control, Daniels escapes from Croit's attempts to control him and flees.

Blackout returns to Croit's laboratory to find a stabilizer device needed to control his energy. Slowly losing his sanity, Blackout comes to believe that Croit had been researching energies from "Black Stars" and willfully subjected him to experimentation in exchange for dropping charges against him.

Nova encounters Blackout on his way to exact revenge and is easily defeated. Before Nova can catch up with him, Blackout returns to the labs, killing Croit and his new assistant by shunting them into the Darkforce. Following another skirmish with Nova, Blackout vanishes into the Darkforce when he falls onto the stabilizer, destroying it.

Blackout returns to Earth after the stabilizer is inadvertently activated while in storage at Project Pegasus. Believing that Croit is still alive and out to harm him, Blackout attempts to escape. Moonstone tends to Blackout, but he remains in an irrational state. Blackout, now submissive and only responsive to Moonstone's commands, is recruited into the Masters of Evil.

Blackout assists in Baron Zemo's takeover of Avengers Mansion by transporting it into the Darkforce. However, Doctor Druid uses his psychic abilities to break through Zemo and Moonstone's manipulations, restoring some of Blackout's mental faculties. Blackout resists Zemo's mental commands, which causes him to suffer a fatal cerebral hemorrhage.

During the "Secret Empire" storyline, Blackout is seen living as a married family man under the alias of Bob Hofstedder until he is found by Baron Zemo, who persuades him to join the Army of Evil. Blackout helps Zemo surround Manhattan in a Darkforce dome to further Hydra's plot. Maria Hill locates Blackout and kills him, destroying the dome.

During the "Damnation" storyline, Blackout is revived when Doctor Strange uses his magic to restore Las Vegas.

== Powers and abilities ==
Blackout was exposed to cosmic radiation, giving him the power to tap into the Darkforce, a source of infinite dark energy, and to manipulate it in various ways. He can project Darkforce as concussive energy with tremendous force, allowing him to create simple Darkforce constructs. In addition, Blackout can mentally open portals to and from the Darkforce dimension.

== In other media ==
- Marcus Daniels appears in Agents of S.H.I.E.L.D., portrayed by Patrick Brennan. This version worked as a laboratory assistant before he was exposed to Darkforce energy, gaining the ability to absorb all forms of energy. After escaping prison, Daniels is confronted by Phil Coulson and his team, who overload him with spotlights modified to produce gamma radiation and cause him to explode.
- Blackout appears in Lego Marvel Super Heroes 2 via the "Cloak and Dagger" DLC.
