= Avengers: Standoff! =

Marvel Comics event

- Publisher: Marvel Comics
- Publication date: March – April 2016
- Genre: Superhero
- Main character(s): Captain America; Avengers; Howling Commandos; Illuminati; New Avengers; S.H.I.E.L.D. Uncanny Avengers

"Avengers: Standoff!" is a 2016 comic book storyline in Marvel Comics that was created by Nick Spencer, Mark Bagley, and Jesus Saiz.

== Premise ==
This storyline depicts the Avengers investigating the mysterious gated community of Pleasant Hill, trying to determine the nature of its involvement with S.H.I.E.L.D.

== Plot ==
Upon being alerted of a catastrophic event, Winter Soldier returns to Earth. Winter Soldier traces the source of the catastrophic event to a S.H.I.E.L.D. facility, where he ends up fighting off S.H.I.E.L.D. agents. In the middle of the woods, a young man awakens with amnesia. After being brought to the gated community of Pleasant Hill, he is examined by Erik Selvig and other doctors. 19 days later, a young man named Jim moves to Pleasant Hill. He meets with the mechanic Phil, who has created a device that enables people to return to their true selves and stolen a training video revealing that Pleasant Hill's residents are supervillains who were transformed by Kobik and given amnesia. As Phil uses the device on himself and Jim to restore their true selves, it is revealed that they are respectively Fixer and Baron Helmut Zemo. Both of them vow to use the device on the other villains and destroy Pleasant Hill. After restoring several of the inmates' memories, Zemo leads them in attacking the S.H.I.E.L.D. outpost that served as the Pleasant Hill city hall.

Phil Coulson's group learns about Pleasant Hill and Rick Jones' involvement. Deathlok, Daisy Johnson, and Jemma Simmons investigate Rick's house and discover a hidden escape route. They follow Rick through the Morlock tunnels and apprehend him. During an interrogation at the S.H.I.E.L.D. Battlecarrier, the New Avengers arrive to retrieve Rick.

Answering Steve Rogers' call, the Avengers Unity Division arrive in Connecticut, where they discover Wrecker trying to escape in an SUV with Maria Hill. The Division helps Wrecker and Hill avoid the S.H.I.E.L.D. forces. While on their way to Pleasant Hill, the Avengers Unity Division is attacked by another version of Hill.

In New York City, the Avengers have defeated an escapee from Pleasant Hill when Hill arrives to keep the Avengers from getting involved. However, the Avengers convince her to transport them to Connecticut. When the Avengers and Hill arrive in Pleasant Hill, they notice the Avengers Unity Division and another Hill with them. The Hill who is with the Avengers opens fire, leading to a brief scuffle between the Avengers and the Division before they are trapped by Kobik and turned into inhabitants of Pleasant Hill.

On the S.H.I.E.L.D. Battlecarrier, the New Avengers confront the agents of S.H.I.E.L.D. and retrieve Rick Jones from their custody. It turns out that the New Avengers were contacted by Rick through a pre-recorded video. The Pentagon learns about the New Avengers' invasion of the S.H.I.E.L.D. Battlecarrier. Considering it an act of war, Robert Maverick advises the Pentagon that they should retaliate by unleashing a monster called the American Kaiju on the New Avengers.

Amongst the villain rampage caused by Baron Zemo and Fixer, Hill is injured as Steve reasons with Zemo to let her get medical attention. Father Patrick then takes Steve to Erik Selvig's clinic to enlist his help in tending to Hill. With help from Selvig, Steve heads to the Pleasant Hill bowling alley to get to Kobik so that she can restore the peace. After attempting to reason with Kobik, Steve is attacked by Crossbones. Unbeknownst to him, Patrick is a clone of Red Skull in disguise and orchestrated the villain uprising.

In flashbacks, Maverick oversees Project Troubleshooter, a facility that develops human soldiers, and transforms Corporal Todd Ziller into the American Kaiju using gamma radiation, Mutant Growth Hormone, Pym Particles, and the Lizard formula. In the present, American Kaiju attacks Avengers Idea Mechanics, with Sunspot employing the Avenger Five mech to battle him.

After Quicksilver saves the Avengers from Kobik, they discover that the two Maria Hills are Femme Fatales members Mindblast and Bloodlust. When the inmates attack the Avengers, Deadpool reaches out to Kobik and convinces her to stand down.

However, Kraven the Hunter leads the villains in capturing Kobik and attempt to return her to her original Cosmic Cube form. However, the Avengers manage to defeat the villains. In the aftermath, Maria Hill is reprimanded by the World Security Council, but continues to operate under their supervision. Meanwhile, Kobik teleports Zemo and Selvig to an unknown part of the Himalayas and approaches Winter Soldier, hoping to ally with him, while Red Skull's clone starts to re-establish Hydra.

== Titles involved ==
The following titles are listed in order of release:

- Avengers Standoff: Welcome to Pleasant Hill #1
- Avengers Standoff: Assault on Pleasant Hill Alpha #1
- Agents of S.H.I.E.L.D. #3
- Uncanny Avengers Vol. 3 #7
- All-New, All-Different Avengers #7
- New Avengers Vol. 4 #8
- Howling Commandos of S.H.I.E.L.D. #6
- Captain America: Sam Wilson #7
- Uncanny Avengers Vol. 3 #8
- New Avengers Vol. 4 #9
- Illuminati #6
- Agents of S.H.I.E.L.D. #4
- All-New, All-Different Avengers #8
- New Avengers Vol. 4 #10
- Captain America: Sam Wilson #8
- Avengers Standoff: Assault on Pleasant Hill Omega #1

== Collected editions ==
Title	Material collected	Published date	ISBN
Avengers Standoff Volume 1	Avengers Standoff: Welcome To Pleasant Hill #1, Avengers Standoff: Assault on Pleasant Hill #1, Agents of S.H.I.E.L.D. #3-4, New Avengers (vol. 4) #8-10 and Uncanny Avengers (vol. 3) #7	June 2016	978-1846537356
Avengers Standoff Volume 2	All-New, All-Different Avengers #7-8, Captain America: Sam Wilson #7-8, Illuminati #6, Howling Commandos of S.H.I.E.L.D. #6, Avengers Standoff: Assault On Pleasant Hill Omega #1	June 2016	978-1846537370
Avengers: Standoff	Avengers Standoff: Welcome To Pleasant Hill #1, Avengers Standoff: Assault On Pleasant Hill Alpha #1, Agents Of S.H.I.E.L.D. #3-4, Uncanny Avengers (vol. 3) #7-8, All-New, All-Different Avengers #7-8, New Avengers (vol. 4) #8-10, Captain America: Sam Wilson #7-8, Illuminati #6, Howling Commandos of S.H.I.E.L.D. #6, Avengers Standoff: Assault On Pleasant Hill Omega #1	July 2016	978-1302901479
New Avengers Vol. 2: Standoff	New Avengers (vol. 4) #6-11	August 2016	978-0785196495
All-New, All-Different Avengers Vol. 2: Standoff	All-New, All-Different Avengers #7-12, Free Comic Book Day 2016 (Civil War II) (B Story)	September 2016	978-1846537608
Captain America: Sam Wilson Vol. 2: Standoff	Captain America: Sam Wilson #7-12	October 2016	978-0785196419
