= Crimson Cowl =

The Crimson Cowl is an identity used by several characters appearing in American comic books published by Marvel Comics.

== Publication history ==
The first incarnation of Crimson Cowl, created by writer Roy Thomas and artist John Buscema, first appeared in The Avengers #54 (July 1968).

The second incarnation of Crimson Cowl, created by Kurt Busiek and Mark Bagley, debuted in Thunderbolts #3 (June 1997). Her true identity was revealed in Thunderbolts #67 (September 2002) by Fabian Nicieza.

== Fictional character biographies ==
=== Justine Hammer ===
Justine Hammer

Publication information
- Publisher: Marvel Comics
- First appearance: Thunderbolts vol. 1 #3 (June 1997; as Crimson Cowl); Thunderbolts vol. 1 #67 (September 2002); Iron Man vol. 7 #1 (October 2024; as Iron Monger)
- Created by: Kurt Busiek; Mark Bagley; Fabian Nicieza

In-story information
- Alter ego: Justine Hammer
- Species: Human
- Team affiliations: Masters of Evil; Hammer Industries; Roxxon
- Notable aliases: Crimson Cowl; Iron Monger

Justine Hammer is the daughter of Justin Hammer and the mother of Sasha Hammer. Justine dealt with disapproval from her father; as a result, she aims to prove her worthiness and accumulate power for herself as the Crimson Cowl. Hammer forms her own version of the Masters of Evil while working for Hydra to win the favor of New York City's crime families.

After the Thunderbolts turn on Baron Zemo, the Crimson Cowl attempts to induct the group into the Masters of Evil. She sends Cyclone to bait the Thunderbolts into an ambush. After defeating the Thunderbolts, she attempts to blackmail the group into joining her, threatening to turn the group over to enemies. The Thunderbolts decline her offer and are saved by Hawkeye.

Justine later appears as an enemy of Iron Man, having abandoned the Crimson Cowl identity to lead Hammer Industries. After Iron Man and Zeke Stane join forces, Stane kills Hammer in revenge for the Mandarin's abuse.

Hammer is resurrected by Belasco, acting as Iron Monger in a plot to take over Stark Unlimited. At Stark Tower, Hammer has Doctor Druid and Monica Rappaccini as her brokers. The board of directors initially support Hammer, resulting in a fight with Iron Man where her demonic deal is revealed. Iron Man convinces Hammer's demonic benefactors to cease and the board of directors in changing the vote. After being dropped off at Stark Tower, Hammer surrenders her Iron Monger armor to Iron Man.

== Powers and abilities ==
Justine Hammer is an adept athlete, an unarmed combatant, a shrewd businesswoman and a skilled negotiator, making her a formidable leader and a criminal organizer.

=== Equipment ===
Hammer's main equipment is her Crimson Cowl cloak, which is prehensile and can form sharp edges with its corners. Her Crimson Cowl cloak also contains devices enabling her to levitate and teleport.

Hammer has also utilized her version of the Iron Monger armor.

== Other versions ==
=== Ultimate Marvel ===
The Ultimate Marvel version of Justine Hammer is a tech-based enhanced individual and the daughter of Justin Hammer Jr. In Ultimate Comics: Armor Wars, she suffered from a sickness from her enhancements as she assists Iron Man. It is revealed that Hammer had been working for Howard Stark Sr. which culminated in a technological disruption device that killed her.

=== Ultimate Universe ===
An alternate universe version of Justine Hammer appears in The Ultimates. This version is the CEO of Hammer Weapons. Hammer and her business partners are later killed by Emma Frost.

== In other media ==
- The Justine Hammer incarnation of Crimson Cowl appears as a boss in Marvel: Avengers Alliance.
- An original incarnation of the Crimson Cowl appears as an unlockable skin for Spider-Man in Spider-Man: Miles Morales.
