= List of Thunderbolts members =

The Thunderbolts is a team of comic book supervillains and superheroes, as published by Marvel Comics.

The roster of the team has changed a great deal for many years. This page consists of the list of members during the team's history.

== Roster list ==
The codenames listed under Character are those used during the time the character was a member; under the notes section, super-villain codenames are listed if applicable. Many characters changed their codenames upon joining. Characters with multiple codenames during their membership have them listed in order of appearance, separated by a slash (/), and listed after their leader.

=== First group ===
The following are members of the original Thunderbolts:

- Citizen V / Baron Helmut Zemo (leader)
- Atlas / Goliath
- MACH-I / MACH-II / MACH-III / MACH-IV / MACH-V / MACH-X / Beetle
- Meteorite / Moonstone
- Songbird / Screaming Mimi
- Techno / Fixer (Paul Ebersol)
- Jolt
- Hawkeye
- Charcoal
- Ogre
- Amazon / Man-Killer
- Blackheath / Plantman
- Cyclone (Pierre Fresson)
- Harrier / Cardinal
- Skein / Gypsy Moth
- Vantage

=== Second group ===
The following were members of second incarnation of the Thunderbolts:

- Atlas
- Songbird
- Blizzard (Donnie Gill)
- Photon
- Joystick
- Speed Demon
- Radioactive Man
- Swordsman (Andreas von Strucker)
- Nighthawk

==== Thunderbolts Army ====
During the "Civil War", apprehended villains were given a choice to either help the Thunderbolts or go to jail. The project occurred three weeks earlier with the threat of the Grandmaster and his Squadron Sinister. Some of them reformed and joined the Thunderbolts in the end, returned to a life of crime, or joined the Initiative.

- Ajaxis
- Aqueduct
- Batroc the Leaper
- Blacklash
- Bloodstrike
- The Beetles
  - Gary Quinn
  - Joaquim Robichaux
  - Elizabeth Vaughn
- Boomerang
- Bullseye
- Bushmaster
- Death Adder
- Doctor Octopus
- Eel
- Green Goblin
- Iron Maiden
- Jack O'Lantern
- Jester
- Killer Shrike
- King Cobra
- Lady Deathstrike
- Machete
- Mongoose
- Overmind
- Ox (Ronald Bloch)
- Porcupine (Roger Gocking)
- Primus
- Psionex
  - Coronary
  - Mathemanic
  - Pretty Persuasions
- Quicksand
- Rattler
- Red Ronin
- Scarecrow
- Silk Fever
- Slyde
- Smiling Tiger
- Snake Marston
- Taskmaster
- Tatterdemalion
- Texas Twister
- Unicorn
- Venom (Mac Gargan)
- Vermin
- Whiplash
- Whirlwind
- U-Foes
  - Ironclad
  - Vector
  - X-Ray
  - Vapor
- Wrecking Crew
  - Bulldozer
  - Piledriver
  - Thunderball
  - Wrecker
  - Zaran

=== Third group ===
The following are members of the third incarnation of the Thunderbolts following the "Civil War" storyline:

- Green Goblin (leader)
- Moonstone
- Bullseye
- Penance
- Radioactive Man
- Songbird
- Swordsman (Andreas von Strucker)
- Venom

=== Fourth Thunderbolts ===
During the "Dark Reign" storyline, the following were members of this incarnation of the Thunderbolts, which was overseen by H.A.M.M.E.R.:

- Ant-Man
- Black Widow - Revealed to be Natasha Romanoff in disguise.
- Paladin
- Ghost
- Headsman
- Mister X
- Scourge
- Grizzly

=== Fifth group ===
During the "Heroic Age" storyline, the following members are members of this incarnation of the Thunderbolts:

- Luke Cage (leader)
- Fixer
- Moonstone
- MACH-V
- Songbird
- Ghost
- Crossbones
- Juggernaut
- Man-Thing
- Hyperion
- Satana
- Underbolts
  - Boomerang
  - Centurius
  - Mister Hyde
  - Shocker
  - Troll
- Dark Avengers
  - Barney Barton
  - Ai Apaec
  - June Covington
  - Ragnarok

=== Sixth group ===
The following are members of this incarnation of the Thunderbolts:

- Red Hulk (leader)
- Deadpool
- Elektra
- Punisher
- Agent Venom
- Red Leader
- Mercy
- Ghost Rider

=== Seventh group ===
Following the "Avengers: Standoff!" storyline, the following are members of this incarnation of the Thunderbolts:

- Winter Soldier (leader)
- Fixer
- Atlas
- Moonstone
- MACH-X
- Kobik

=== Eighth Thunderbolts ===
The following are members of this incarnation of the Thunderbolts, which hunted Punisher:

- Citizen V / Baron Zemo (leader)
- Moonstone
- Ghost
- Fixer
- Radioactive Man
- Jigsaw - He posed as Paladin.

=== Ninth Thunderbolts ===
During the "King in Black" storyline, Mayor Wilson Fisk forms a new incarnation of the Thunderbolts to combat Knull.

- Taskmaster (leader)
- Mister Fear (Larry Cranston)
- Batroc the Leaper
- Rhino
- Star
- Ampere - A villain with electrical gauntlets. Killed by Mister Fear for trying to leave the group.
- Snakehead - A villain in a snake mask. Killed by a Symbiote Dragon.
- Figment
- Foolkiller
- Grizzly
- Man-Bull
- Mister Hyde

=== Tenth Thunderbolts ===
During the "Devil's Reign" storyline, Mayor Wilson Fisk passes a law that forbids superhero activities and forms another version of the Thunderbolts to apprehend any superheroes who break the law.

- U.S. Agent (leader)
- Agony (Gemma Shin)
- Electro (Francine Frye)
- Shocker
- Rhino
- Doctor Octopus
- Taskmaster
- Whiplash (Anton Vanko)
- Kraven the Hunter - This version was formerly known as the "Last Son of Kraven".
- Coachwhip
- Puff Adder
- Abomination

=== Eleventh Thunderbolts ===
This group assembles in the aftermath of the Devil's Reign storyline:

- Hawkeye (leader)
- Spectrum
- America Chavez
- Power Man
- Persuasion
- Gutsen Glory - A new character whose background is classified.
- Eegro the Unbreakable - A new character from Monster Isle who is said to have an ultimate attack which involves him growing to gigantic size.

=== Twelfth Thunderbolts ===
Following the events of "Captain America: Cold War", Bucky Barnes assembles a new lineup consisting of the world's best spies and assassins to permanently eliminate the Red Skull.

- Revolution (Bucky Barnes) (leader)
- Valentina Allegra de Fontaine (Life Model Decoy)
- Destroyer (Sharon Carter)
- Red Guardian (Alexei Shostakov)
- Black Widow (Natasha Romanova)
- White Widow (Yelena Belova)
- Gamemaster / Shang-Chi
- U.S. Agent
- Songbird
- Ghost Rider (Sal Romero)
- Midnight Angels
  - Ayo
  - Aneka

=== Fulgar Victoris ===
During "One World Under Doom", after Revolution rejects Doctor Doom's offer to lead Latveria's own Thunderbolts team, Doom creates his own Thunderbolts called the Fulgar Victoris, with the real Valentina Allegra de Fontaine leading the team as Citizen V.

- Citizen V (Valentina Allegra de Fontaine) (leader)
- Fixer
- Mach-Doom ("Abner Jenkins") - Later revealed as a Doombot posing as him.
- Moonstone
- Atlas

== Marvel Cinematic Universe ==
In the Marvel Cinematic Universe, Contessa Valentina Allegra de Fontaine, director of the Central Intelligence Agency (CIA), publicly rebrands the Thunderbolts team as the New Avengers. The members are:

- Yelena Belova / Black Widow (leader)
- James "Bucky" Barnes / Winter Soldier
- Ava Starr / Ghost
- Alexei Shostakov / Red Guardian
- John Walker / U.S. Agent
- Bob Reynolds / Sentry

While the character Taskmaster (Antonia Dreykov) is featured prominently in the marketing material, she never officially becomes a member of the team, and dies early into the film.
