= Eric O'Grady =

Eric O'Grady Ant-Man / Black Ant
- Eric O'Grady in his prototype Ant-Man suit surrounded by ants. Art by Phil Hester and Ande Parks.

Publication information
- Publisher: Marvel Comics
- First appearance: First appearance: The Irredeemable Ant-Man #1 (December 2006); As Life Model Decoy: Secret Avengers #24 (March 2012); As Black Ant: Secret Avengers #32 (October 2012)
- Created by: Robert Kirkman (writer); Phil Hester (artist)

In-story information
- Alter ego: Eric O'Grady
- Team affiliations: Damage Control; Initiative; Secret Avengers; Shadow Initiative; S.H.I.E.L.D. Thunderbolts
- Notable aliases: Slaying Mantis, Derek Sullivan, G.I. Ant-Man
- Abilities: G.I.Ant-Man armor allows: Size manipulation Insect communication Flight via jetpack Robotic arms with magnetic grapples Flame projection from arms via redirecting jet flame

Eric O'Grady is the name of two characters appearing in American comic books published by Marvel Comics. The first is an immoral Irish human superhero who is the third character to use the Ant-Man name, created by writer Robert Kirkman and artist Phil Hester, and first appears in The Irredeemable Ant-Man #1 (December 2006), while the second is a Life Model Decoy made of the original O'Grady's corpse created after his death, revived with a more outwardly villainous mindset and initially continuing as Ant-Man before becoming the supervillain Black Ant, created by writer Rick Remender and artists Gabriel Hardman and Matteo Scalera, and first appearing in Secret Avengers #24 (March 2012).

== Publication history ==
Eric O'Grady was the main character in the ongoing monthly series The Irredeemable Ant-Man, with the "Irredeemable" title given to the comic's title to indicate the character's immoral attitude and behavior. The series was canceled after issue #12, though no official cancellation notice was given, as Marvel Comics simply opted to not solicit issues of The Irredeemable Ant-Man beyond #12. The final issue mocked the idea of cancellation while concluding its main storyline, such as having O'Grady scream in spite towards a massive assault of canceled comic characters.

Though canceled, the series ended with the character becoming enrolled in the Initiative. With Avengers: The Initiative #8, O'Grady joined the title's cast. He departed from the title after Avengers: The Initiative #20, and as of Thunderbolts #128, is a member of the new Thunderbolts team. After the events of Siege, he becomes a member of the Secret Avengers, beginning with issue one. Beginning in November 2010, he starred alongside Hank Pym in the three-issue mini-series Ant-Man and the Wasp, by Tim Seeley.

Ant-Man appeared as a regular character throughout the 2010–2013 Secret Avengers series, from issue #1 (July 2010) through the character's death in issue #23 (April 2012); the character's corpse was used to create a Life Model Decoy (LMD) with all of his memories in the following issue, who renaming himself the Black Ant in issue #32 on his status as an LMD being revealed, revealing himself as an antagonist in issue #36, before disappearing in his final issue #37 (March 2013). Over the 2010s and 2020s, Black Ant returned in supporting roles as a supervillain and henchman.

== Fictional character biography ==
Eric O'Grady is a low-level Irish agent of S.H.I.E.L.D. who stumbles upon Dr. Henry "Hank" Pym's latest incarnation of the Ant-Man suit in the S.H.I.E.L.D. headquarters. A man of very few morals with a willingness to lie, cheat, steal and manipulate in order to get ahead in life, O'Grady immediately steals the Ant-Man suit for his own selfish plans, which include using his status as a "super-hero" to stalk women and facilitate his thievery. A running theme with the character is his evil side clashing with a desire to be accepted by others, which leads to O'Grady vowing to renounce his evil ways and become a proper hero, causing a cycle of the character relapsing and vowing to "change".

When Wolverine attacks the S.H.I.E.L.D. Helicarrier, Mitchell Carson orders O'Grady and his roommate Chris McCarthy to guard Hank Pym and the new Ant-Man suit. Pym walks out and they panic and knock Pym out. McCarthy accidentally runs off with the suit to escape Wolverine, but when Elektra attacks the Helicarrier a month later, McCarthy is killed by a Hydra agent and O'Grady steals the Ant-Man suit from his dead body. Instead of returning the suit, he uses it to steal stuff and spy on the women's showers. When O'Grady joins fellow S.H.I.E.L.D. agent Veronica King, McCarthy's girlfriend in mourning his death, they start a brief relationship with Veronica getting pregnant. Carson, originally trained to be the stolen Ant-Man suit's wearer, was forced to wear a hastily built prototype suit and track down the thief. In the ensuing battle, O'Grady disfigured Carson's face by accident with his suit's jets, burning the left half of Carson's face and leaving him deaf and blind on that side. O'Grady took Carson to a nearby infirmary but Carson still vowed revenge. After escaping the Helicarrier, O'Grady then uses his powers to continue peeping and only saves attractive woman who he then tries to bed. He eventually tries to sneak into Ms. Marvel's purse.

During a battle, O'Grady tries looting a jewelry store and encounters the thief Black Fox who steals his bag of jewels. He reluctantly saves a girl's life from rubble and encounters Damage Control's new "Search and Rescue" team.

After he obtains a fake ID under the name Derek Sullivan and comes up with the new superhero name Slaying Mantis, this organization offers him a job and he consents. He meets Abigail and they start dating. He leases an apartment under his new name, and with Damage Control's help, begins to establish a new identity while continuing to hide from S.H.I.E.L.D. However, as Abigail begins to fall in love with O'Grady, she reveals to him that she is a single mother with a son. This in turn triggers O'Grady dumping Abigail over keeping her son's existence a secret from him while pursuing a romantic relationship with him.

Black Fox later shows up looking for the jewels. O'Grady, however, had already sold them to a pawn shop. The two work together, getting the $150,000 back and splitting the proceeds, with O'Grady keeping 15 percent. They form a close friendship afterward.

During a later confrontation with Abigail, she reveals that she possesses the power to read people's emotions telepathically. She promptly states that her power reveals that O'Grady truly loves her. Before he can answer, the Hulk begins an attack on Manhattan. O'Grady reluctantly joins the fray by attacking Hulk from the inside of his body. However, the Hulk's stomach and innards proved to be just as tough and O'Grady ended up being discharged through Hulk's nostrils. He awakes in a S.H.I.E.L.D. infirmary, with Mitch Carson standing by his bed, stating that he is under arrest.

Carson takes O'Grady to a secret room aboard the Helicarrier, and proceeds to torture him. While doing so, Carson reveals shocking secrets to O'Grady regarding his own sociopathic nature and abusing being a S.H.I.E.L.D. agent to cover up murders over the years. Just as Carson is on the verge of burning O'Grady's face with the Ant-Man suit's jet boosters, Iron Man arrives and subdues Carson. O'Grady uses Carson's confessions of past misdeeds to frame his captor for the stolen Ant-Man suit fiasco, saying that he was only trying to stop the Ant-Man suit for being used for evil. Iron Man refuses to believe O'Grady, though Iron Man is quickly sidetracked by the arrival of the Black Fox (now friends with O'Grady after their first encounter). Black Fox demands that O'Grady be released and claims to have placed explosives on the Helicarrier in order to extort his friend's freedom. O'Grady refuses Black Fox's claims to protect him from Iron Man, leading to Black Fox being arrested.

Several weeks pass and it is shown that O'Grady has resumed his post upon the Helicarrier, having been offered his own job under unknown circumstances. Feeling guilty for Black Fox being in jail, O'Grady helps the elderly thief escape from the Helicarrier, with O'Grady admitting that he was sorry for putting Black Fox through the ordeal of being arrested. Later on, O'Grady refuses Veronica's attempt to work out an arrangement for raising their child together, in part because of his inner fear that he would be a horrible father due to his utter lack of morals or ethics. Meanwhile, despite their misgivings, Iron Man and Pym reluctantly offer O'Grady the Ant-Man suit back after determining that none of the other candidates can control the suit to the degree that O'Grady has already demonstrated, on the condition of him becoming part of the Initiative, which O'Grady accepts.

O'Grady also has one last meeting with Abigail and tells her that he does, indeed, love her. However, he tells Abigail that he will be leaving for a while and wishes to be with her. While doing so, he hopes that he can be a better person. Before leaving, he tells her his real name.

In spite of his vows to Abigail, O'Grady continues his lewd and irredeemable ways upon joining the Initiative. In particular, during his first meeting with Taskmaster, O'Grady attempts to slander the Ant-Man name of his predecessor Scott Lang by passing off stories of his lewd stalker behavior regarding Ms. Marvel onto Lang, as well as claiming that Lang was never an official member of the Avengers. When Stature overhears Taskmaster and O'Grady laughing at these lies, Stature attacks by growing to giant size and attempts to step on O'Grady. As Stature and O'Grady's fight begins to attract the attention of people outside the Initiative compound, Taskmaster brings them down with his shield.

When the Skrulls begin an invasion in New York City, the Initiative are ordered to fight. O'Grady decides to avoid this by shrinking down and hiding. O'Grady discovers the Skrulls' last resort plan: to open a giant Negative Zone portal, and have the entire United States removed from this dimension. Escaping the Skrulls on the back of one of their shock troopers, O'Grady brings the information to some of the remaining Initiative members, and they set out to stop the plan from happening.

Following the Skrulls' defeat, O'Grady is commended for his good work, and is promoted to a position in the Thunderbolts during the "Dark Reign" storyline.

However, O'Grady began to regret his actions in the Thunderbolts but can not do anything since Osborn would have him killed. Paladin advised that he wait until Osborn inevitably goes insane and is taken down. Ant-Man later secretly witnesses Paladin, Ghost and Headsman turn against Mister X and Scourge when they are ordered to execute the original Black Widow and Songbird, then erase their teammates' memories. He later assists in the capture of Luke Cage by entering Cage's nervous system. However, when his teammates make no effort to extract him, O'Grady helps Cage to escape.

O'Grady becomes increasingly disgruntled with the Thunderbolts, and concerned for his future. In order to earn some goodwill, he helps Captain America escape from custody, asking that he keep this in mind in the future. Later, when sent with the rest of the team to infiltrate Asgard and steal Gungnir, he once again faces off with Stature.

After Scourge finds Gungnir, he attempts to take it to the Iron Patriot, but is stopped by Paladin finally having enough of serving a madman. Grizzly attacks Paladin to kill him for treason but O'Grady shrinks down and enters Grizzly's ear canal, incapacitating Grizzly and saving Paladin's life. As the Mighty Avengers defeat what remains of the Thunderbolts, O'Grady finds Gungnir and gives it to Paladin, who hides it from the Iron Patriot. After the battle, O'Grady decides to re-evaluate the choices he has made and to do something good with his life.

Eric O'Grady is later seen as a member of the Secret Avengers, using the real Pym's classic Ant-Man gear. He was invited by Steve Rogers, who believed that he had potential to be a better person. O'Grady is positioned as the rookie of the group and is teamed up with War Machine, who believes O'Grady is not worthy of the Ant-Man name.

O'Grady uses his position with the Secret Avengers as a tool for sexual encounters with various women. Black Fox comes to him with info regarding A.I.M. to hopefully boost O'Grady's relationship with Hank Pym. When Abigail comes by, O'Grady admits his longing for a relationship with the intention of starting one, only for Abigail to find evidence of him being unfaithful. After running into Striker, Finesse and Veil, O'Grady talks the ladies into a private drinking party, where he passes out and they put shaving cream on his face before leaving him. After waking up, O'Grady is faced with Striker, who he blames for the shaving cream incident and starts a fight with. Tigra saves O'Grady from Striker as Pym explains the situation.

On a mission against Father (the creator of the World facility) with the Secret Avengers, O'Grady is beaten to death by Father's henchmen while defending a child's life. It is later revealed that Father created a Life Model Decoy of him (with all of his memories and returned to a amoral mindset) to replace him, who later becomes the supervillain Black Ant.

== Powers and abilities ==
While wearing the Ant-Man suit, Eric O'Grady has the ability to shrink to the size of an insect while retaining full-sized strength. He also possesses two robotic arms he can release from his Ant-Man suit's back when he is shrunk. The Ant-Man suit's main mode of transportation is a jetpack that can be detached and used as a weapon by turning the jet's flames onto an enemy. He also has the ability to talk to insects while wearing the Ant-Man suit. However, he has not quite trained in this ability and is somewhat lacking in skill. After joining The Initiative, it was revealed that O'Grady's Ant-Man armor was the prototype "G.I. Ant-Man" suit that could also increase O'Grady's size. During this time, his Ant-Man helmet seemed to become more of a close-fitting piece of fabric, as it moulded itself to his facial expressions, and could even be peeled upwards to allow him to drink.

As a member of the Secret Avengers, his redesigned Ant-Man costume was also fitted with Wasp-like stingers in the gloves. The Ant-Man suit retains the original version's 'cyberlegs' not visible when retracted.

== Reception ==
IGN listed Eric O'Grady as the 82nd greatest comic book hero of all time stating that he is another hero who faces the challenge of living up to a huge legacy but he is truly good at heart, and he has made great strides when it comes to doing justice to the venerated Ant-Man name, and as #43 on their list of the "Top 50 Avengers".

== Alternate version ==
In Marvel Universe Vs. The Punisher, set a world where a plague turned heroes and villains into zombies, Ant-Man (Eric O'Grady) was among the infected. He was later killed by the Punisher to which his head was displayed as a hunting trophy.

== In other media ==
- Eric O'Grady makes a cameo appearance in The Avengers: Earth's Mightiest Heroes episode "Nightmare in Red".
- Eric O'Grady appears in the Spider-Woman: Agent of S.W.O.R.D. motion comic, voiced by Jeffrey Hedquist.

== Collected editions ==
Title	Material Collected	Date Published	ISBN
The Irredeemable Ant-Man: Low-Life	Irredeemable Ant-Man #1–6	July 11, 2007	ISBN 978-0785119623
The Irredeemable Ant-Man: Small-Minded	Irredeemable Ant-Man #7–12	December 26, 2007	ISBN 978-0785119630
The Irredeemable Ant-Man Omnibus	Irredeemable Ant-Man #1–12	July 1, 2009	ISBN 978-0785140863
Ant-Man and Wasp: Small World	Ant-Man and Wasp #1–3 and material from Tales to Astonish #44–48	June 22, 2011	ISBN 978-0785155676
Ant-Man: Ant-Niversary	Ant-Man (vol. 3) #1–4 and material from Tales To Astonish #37, #43	January 2023	978-1302945428
