= Headsman (character) =

Publication information
- Publisher: Marvel Comics
- First appearance: Untold Tales of Spider-Man #8 (April 1996)
- Created by: Kurt Busiek and Pat Olliffe

In-story information
- Alter ego: Cleavon Twain
- Species: Human
- Team affiliations: Thunderbolts
- Notable aliases: Green Goblin

Headsman is a fictional character appearing in American comic books published by Marvel Comics. His apparent real name is Cleavon Twain (a play on the words "cleave in twain") though it is unclear if this is his actual birth name or simply an alias.

== Fictional character biography ==
=== Origin ===
Cleavon Twain and his older brother grew up on a chicken farm in Louisiana. There, Cleavon had a pet dog who repeatedly tried to bite his brother. This led him to warn Cleavon that he would kill the dog if he attacked him one more time. Eventually the dog bit his brother and was subsequently killed by him. Cleavon was heartbroken, but still looked up to his brother. The brothers later joined a biker gang called the 'Headhunters'. They later became estranged, with Cleavon becoming a criminal while his brother returned to life on the farm.

Eventually, Cleavon Twain made his way to New York, where he was tracked down by the Green Goblin (Norman Osborn) and given advanced technology, including a high-tech adamantium axe, a hover platform for transportation, and a strength-boosting harness. As Headsman, Cleavon is sent to help the Enforcers escape from Spider-Man, which he accomplishes by forcing Spider-Man to flee. Harry Osborn alerts Spider-Man about where the criminals were meeting, allowing him to intercept them and damage Headsman's power pack. After repairing his pack, Headsman works with Lucky Lobo in an attempt to kill Spider-Man. Believing he had killed Spider-Man, he left the hero buried under a pile of rubble. Headman faces Spider-Man again when the Green Goblin attacks the Headsman and reveals that he had been his employer. Green Goblin destroys Headsman's equipment and knocks him out, allowing Spider-Man to turn him in to the police.

=== Thunderbolts ===
Many years later, the Headsman joins Osborn's Thunderbolts black ops team. He helps discredit Doc Samson by attacking Air Force One disguised as the Green Goblin. Osborn saves the President in a staged attack by tossing Headsman out of the plane. Ghost later tells Headsman that, on his first mission, he had been using a faulty gravity-grip, which Ghost repaired. It is suggested that Osborn had meant for him to die in his fall from the plane. When the Thunderbolts capture Songbird and Black Widow, they are ordered to execute them. Headsman, Ghost and Paladin refuse to kill the prisoners and allow them to escape, knocking out their teammates and erasing their memories of the event.

==== Death ====
The Uranian of the Agents of Atlas later implants a suggestion in the mind of Scourge to execute Osborn when he next sees him; after the mission, a hologram of Osborn appears before the Thunderbolts, which triggers Scourge to shoot. However, the bullet passes through this hologram and hits Headsman instead, killing him.

== Powers and abilities ==
The Headsman wears a power pack which enhances his strength. He wields a high-tech adamantium vibro-axe and has a disc-shaped hovercraft for personal transportation. Even without these devices, he possess exceptional strength and endurance for a normal human, and has incredible skill with an axe.

== In other media ==
Headsman appears in the Spider-Woman motion comics, voiced by Jesse Falcon.
