= Conspiracy (comics) =

Fictional villain group in comic books

The Conspiracy

Publication information
- Publisher: Marvel Comics
- First appearance: The Rampaging Hulk #1 (January 1977)

In-story information
- Base(s): Cavern beneath New York City
- Member(s): Atlan; Bubbles O'Day; Centurius; Dr. Judan Bardham; Kaballa

The Conspiracy is an alliance of five supervillains appearing in American comic books published by Marvel Comics.

== Fictional history ==
The Conspiracy was formed with the intent of recovering fragments of the Bloodgem which Ulysses Bloodstone shattered in his initial confrontation with his nemesis, the extraterrestrial Ullux'yl Kwan T'ae 'Sny. When the Bloodgem shattered, one of the fragments became embedded in Bloodstone's chest, granting him superhuman strength and immortality. The Conspiracy intends to reunite the Bloodgem fragments into a single gem with the intent of gaining power as Bloodstone had.

The Conspiracy eventually succeed in obtaining and reuniting the Bloodgem fragments, including Ulysses Bloodstone's fragment. They do so by surgically removing the fragment from Bloodstone's chest, killing him in the process. Rather than gaining the power they desired from the gem's restoration, the Conspiracy members are pulled from their bodies and into the gem by the Exo-Mind, a malevolent personality that dwelt inside the Bloodgem. The Exo-Mind uses the life energies of the Conspiracy to transform the Bloodgem into a giant crystalline monster. Ulysses Bloodstone, resurrected briefly by the residual energy of his Bloodgem fragment, sacrifices himself to destroy the monster, which presumably kills the Conspiracy members as well.

Years later, Captain America comes across the skeletal remains of the Conspiracy members while exploring their abandoned subterranean base, confirming that they had died. However, Centurius is shown to have survived.

== Members ==
- Atlan: A sentient dolphin with mystical powers.
- Bubbles O'Day: A female stripper with mental powers derived from a Bloodgem fragment given to her as a gift by an admirer.
- Centurius: A genius who possesses advanced knowledge of genetic engineering and technology.
- Dr. Judan Bardham: An expert cardiologist who was enlisted by the group for his surgical skills which were needed to extract Ulysses Bloodstone's Bloodgem fragment.
- Kaballa: A sorcerer capable of, among other things, teleportation and the conjuring of elemental demons.
