= Mister X (Marvel Comics) =

Publication information
- Publisher: Marvel Comics
- First appearance: Wolverine (vol. 2) #159 (February 2001)
- Created by: Frank Tieri (story) and Sean Chen (art)

In-story information
- Species: Human mutant
- Team affiliations: Thunderbolts
- Abilities: Minor telepathic ability Physical abilities at the pinnacle of human conditioning Master martial artist

Mister X is a supervillain appearing in American comic books published by Marvel Comics. The character was introduced in Wolverine vol. 2 #159 (February 2001) and was created by Frank Tieri and Sean Chen. His henchmen include T & A (nicknamed "Betty and Veronica" by Wolverine), and Blok.

== Fictional character biography ==
Mister X is a wealthy businessman with a psychological addiction to killing that, by his own account, started in his adolescence. His latent telepathic power was awakened by seeing a woman who had been hit by a car, which fascinated him; he felt her die. He soon became obsessed with death, committing murders to recreate the high of telepathically connecting with another person at the moment of their death. He murdered his dog by locking it in an oven, followed soon after by his parents. Using his family's fortune, X traveled throughout the world and studied under some of the finest martial artists in the world. After X learned all he could from each of his teachers, he would kill them.

Cover of Wolverine #159 (February 2001).

For every murder, X would cut a scar somewhere on his body. By the time he first encounters Wolverine, X's torso is covered in hundreds of scars arranged in an ornate pattern. X attempts to have Wolverine sign over the rights to the title of 'The Best There Is' and join his new murder avant-garde, much as T, A, and Blok had done. Wolverine refuses and engages X in battle once again. After learning of X's crimes and the lives he had destroyed over the years, Wolverine enters a deep rage, attacking X despite the severe injuries he is receiving. X is nearly killed and only saved by Blok's interference.

After X defeats him in combat, Taskmaster attempts to kill him as X and Wolverine are fighting. Wolverine's enhanced senses alert him to Taskmaster's presence and allow him to escape the attack. To Wolverine's surprise, X also moved out of harm's way, as though he had also sensed the danger. As the fire from Taskmaster's arrow spreads across the ring, temporarily separating the two combatants, Wolverine surmises that X has telepathic abilities that allows him to predict his opponent's moves. Wolverine allows himself to enter a berserker rage again, leaving X unable to predict his attacks and allowing him to defeat X.

=== Thunderbolts ===
The Thunderbolts are sent after Mister X by Norman Osborn. Black Widow briefs them about X, who informs them that he will be visiting an opera house in Madripoor with Tyger Tiger, and that Black Widow and Paladin will pretend to be ballet dancers. As the witnesses flee, the Thunderbolts reveal that their assassination attempt was a sham and that X had arranged to meet them there. A body double is teleported in and incinerated to cover X's disappearance, and he is welcomed as the newest member of the Thunderbolts. He reveals that he does not need Osborn's money, and is looking for a challenge. After Osborn is defeated, X is savagely beaten and disarmed by Quicksilver.

== Powers and abilities ==
Mister X possesses low-level psychic abilities; his nervous system automatically maps onto the neural motor-function precursors of anyone in close proximity, allowing him to reflexively predict their moves and counter them effortlessly. The combination of his skills and these psychic powers was sufficient for X to defeat Taskmaster, who is one of the finest combatants on Earth, and made it look easy.

However his psychic ability has its limits as he was unable to match the speed of Quicksilver's attacks. His lack of superhuman physical powers contributes greatly to his unwillingness to confront genuine superhuman opponents such as Spider-Man, Luke Cage, or the Hulk, as their vastly superior physical abilities would render his ability to predict their actions useless; Quicksilver mocked him for this by referring to him as "the least dangerous man on the planet." Wolverine has also managed to defeat X in combat by provoking himself into a berserker rage while they fight, thus preventing X from predicting what Wolverine will do next as Wolverine himself is unaware what he shall attempt in that state; Iron Fist has also managed to defeat him in a confrontation by relying on the unpredictable Drunken Fist style of kung-fu.

X possesses the physical capabilities of a man that is in the peak of physical condition. His physical abilities of strength, speed, stamina, agility, dexterity, reflexes and reactions, coordination, balance, and endurance are all enhanced. X claims to be a master of every earthly form of martial arts and some alien fighting styles including Kree and Shi'ar. X is also highly proficient with a variety of weaponry including swords, knives, staffs, and firearms.
