= Jester (Marvel Comics) =

Marvel Comics fictional character

Jester is the name of three supervillains appearing in American comic books published by Marvel Comics.

== Publication history ==
The original Jester first appeared in Daredevil #42 (July 1968) and was created by Stan Lee and Gene Colan.

The second Jester first appeared in Cloak and Dagger vol. 3 #8 and was created by Terry Austin, Mike Vosburg, and Don Cameron. The Civil War: Battle Damage Report one-shot established this Jester's real name as Jody Putt. He also received an entry in The Official Handbook of the Marvel Universe A-Z vol. 6 hardcover.

== Fictional character biography ==
=== Jonathan Powers ===
Jonathan Powers was the first of several costumed criminals to use the identity of the Jester. He is primarily an enemy of Daredevil.

=== Jody Putt ===
Jester

Publication information
- Publisher: Marvel Comics
- First appearance: Cloak and Dagger (vol. 3) #8 (December 1989)
- Created by: Terry Austin; Mike Vosburg; Don Cameron

In-story information
- Alter ego: Jody Putt
- Team affiliations: Assembly of Evil; Thunderbolts
- Abilities: Possesses an arsenal of weaponry

Jody Putt is a fan of supervillains who obtained the costume of the original Jester after he retired to become an actor. Doctor Doom gives Putt an arsenal of weapons, including the Hulk Robot. The Jester recruits a team of villains made up of himself, the Hulk Robot, the Fenris twins, Hydro-Man, and Rock to form the Assembly of Evil. The team is defeated by Cloak and Dagger and several intervening Avengers.

Jester appears during the storyline Civil War as a member of the Thunderbolts. As part of the Thunderbolts, Jester is among the supervillains who help capture unregistered heroes. He is forced into doing so by nanobots in his system, which electrocute him if he disobeys orders. Jester and Jack O'Lantern are sent to bring in Spider-Man, only to be killed by the Punisher.

=== Crazy Gang Jester ===
Jester

Publication information
- Publisher: Marvel Comics
- First appearance: (Earth-238): Marvel Superheroes #377 (September 1981) (Earth-616): The Mighty World of Marvel #10 (March, 1984)
- Created by: (Earth-238): David Thorpe; Paul Neary; Alan Davis (Earth-616): Alan Moore; Alan Davis

In-story information
- Team affiliations: Crazy Gang
- Notable aliases: Clown
- Abilities: Highly skilled acrobat, fencer and kickboxer Carries a fencing foil

Captain Britain is sent to an alternate Earth, known as Earth-238, by Merlyn. Together with Saturnyne, he hopes to save this world from the corruption that threatened it. Instead, the two encounter Mad Jim Jaspers, a lunatic with the ability to warp reality. Serving Jaspers is the Crazy Gang, which includes a counterpart of Jester. Jaspers and the Crazy Gang, including Jester, are killed when Earth-238 is destroyed by Mandragon.

== Powers and abilities ==
Jody Putt has no superpowers, but possesses an arsenal of weaponry given to him by Doctor Doom.

The Crazy Gang's Jester has no superhuman powers, but he is a highly skilled acrobat, fencer and kickboxer, and carries a fencing foil.

== See also ==
- List of jesters
