= Centurius =

Marvel Comics supervillain

- Centurius from Nick Fury, Agent of S.H.I.E.L.D. #2, art by Jim Steranko

Publication information
- Publisher: Marvel Comics
- First appearance: Nick Fury, Agent of S.H.I.E.L.D. #2 (July 1968)
- Created by: Jim Steranko (artist and writer); Frank Giacoia (inker)

In-story information
- Full name: Noah Black
- Species: Human mutate
- Team affiliations: The Conspiracy; Thunderbolts
- Notable aliases: Centurius, Doc Century
- Abilities: Extraordinary genius Advanced knowledge of genetic engineering and physics Peak physical condition Slowed aging Possesses advanced aircraft and spacecraft, and a thermalic suppression beam Use of stun-discs and ray guns As Centurius: Wears advanced technology body armor

Centurius (Noah Black) is a supervillain appearing in American comic books published by Marvel Comics. Debuting in 1968, he was Marvel's first black supervillain.

== Publication history ==
Centurius first appeared in Nick Fury, Agent of S.H.I.E.L.D. #2 (July 1968), and was created by writer and artist Jim Steranko with inker Frank Giacoia.

He has appeared as a regular character in Thunderbolts since issue #157, and has remained with the team since the title transitioned into Dark Avengers beginning with issue #175.

== Fictional character biography ==
Dr. Noah Black is a prize-winning African American geneticist who in the 1930s received a Nobel Prize. He attended a conference on genetics in the 1930s along with other noted geneticists, such as Herbert Wyndham, Arnim Zola, and Wladyslav Shinsky of the Enclave.

Sometime after winning the Prize, Black goes mad, takes the name "Centurius", and seeing himself as the self-proclaimed savior of Earth, retreats to remote Valhalla Island to conduct genetic experiments. On the island, he is successful in evolving numerous monstrous creatures. During the transport of his newly created life forms to an orbiting space ark, secret agents Nick Fury and Jimmy Woo by chance discover Centurius' island when they are forced to crash land their aircraft. The pair of agents initially attempt to convince Centurius to return to civilization with them, but when the geneticist's plot to destroy all life on Earth is revealed, Fury and his companion attack. In a ploy to defeat the agents, Centurius attempts to transform himself into a "superior being" using a device called the Evolutionizer, but instead of evolving he "de-evolves" into a pile of protoplasmic slime.

Centurius "re-evolves" into human form and joins the Conspiracy. The group clashes with Ulysses Bloodstone when the Conspiracy tries to gain untold power by gathering and reuniting the lost fragments of the Bloodgem, a mystic jewel from another dimension. However, the Conspiracy's efforts fail when their essences are absorbed by an enormous crystalline creature created from the Bloodgem. Bloodstone destroys the Bloodgem creature, apparently kills Centurius and the other members of the Conspiracy.

Much later, Centurius is found to not be dead after all and is a prisoner at the Raft, a prison for super powered criminals. He is able to escape the prison with numerous other inmates. Centurius, along with many of the other escaped inmates, joins the Hood's crime syndicate.

Centurius was later selected by Luke Cage to be a part of the "beta team" of the Thunderbolts, alongside Boomerang, Shocker, Gunna, and Mister Hyde.

== Powers and abilities ==
Noah Black is a normal human being, though an extraordinary genius with advanced knowledge of genetic engineering and other areas of science and technology. He holds a PhD in physics. Black was exposed to an "evolution ray" from his Evolutionizer device, which temporarily transformed him into a physically "superior being". Black apparently ages at an extremely slow rate because of his evolution ray.

As Centurius, he wears body armor of his own design but unknown composition which strongly resembles the armor worn by the High Evolutionary. He uses "stun-discs" and ray guns which fire unknown energies.

Centurius has also designed and built advanced aircraft and spacecraft, and a "thermalic suppression beam".
