= Thunderbolts (comics) =

Group of fictional characters in Marvel comics

- Textless variant cover of Thunderbolts #10 (April 2017). Art by Mark Bagley.

Publication information
- Publisher: Marvel Comics
- First appearance: The Incredible Hulk #449 (January 1997)
- Created by: Kurt Busiek; Mark Bagley

In-story information
- Base(s): The Raft; The Cube; Thunderbolts Mountain; Folding Castle; Mt. Charteris; Four Freedoms Plaza; Cellini's Pizzeria

Roster

The Thunderbolts are an antihero/supervillain/superhero team appearing in American comic books published by Marvel Comics. The team consists mostly of reformed supervillains. Created by Kurt Busiek and Mark Bagley, the team first appeared in The Incredible Hulk #449 (January 1997).

The group made their live-action debut in the Marvel Cinematic Universe in their own feature film, Thunderbolts*, which was released on May 2, 2025.

== Publication history ==
The Thunderbolts were first presented, both to readers and to the Marvel Universe, in The Incredible Hulk #449 (January 1997), written by Peter David with art by Mike Deodato Jr., as a team of flamboyant new heroes who stepped up to fill the gap left when the Avengers were declared dead after the events of the 1996 "Onslaught" crossover. The final page of Thunderbolts #1 (April 1997), written by Kurt Busiek with art by Mark Bagley, revealed, however, that the Thunderbolts were actually the Masters of Evil in disguise, a surprise twist carefully guarded by Marvel Comics.

In subsequent storylines, the Thunderbolts, who had been created by Baron Helmut Zemo to strengthen his hold on international crime, turn on him when they realize that being heroes is more fulfilling than their old criminal lives. Rejecting Zemo's leadership, they recruit former Avenger Hawkeye to replace him.

Despite critical acclaim, the book was reformatted with Thunderbolts #76 (March 2003), removing the entire cast and creative team and replacing it with a brand-new set of characters, along with a new writer, John Arcudi.

The Thunderbolts also feature in the Spider-Man storyline "New Ways to Die", which is the first proper showdown between him and the team.

The Heroic Age team debuted in Thunderbolts #144.

The Thunderbolts comic book was renamed Dark Avengers beginning with issue #175. Dark Avengers ended with issue #190.

As part of Marvel NOW!, a new Thunderbolts series was launched featuring a new team composed of Red Hulk, Deadpool, Elektra, Venom, and Punisher. This series ended in October 2014 with issue #32.

In July 2023, a new Thunderbolts series debuted, featuring Winter Soldier and Valentina Allegra de Fontaine and consisting of espionage-themed superheroes, including Black Widow, Sharon Carter, White Widow, Red Guardian, and U.S. Agent.

In March 2025, the New Thunderbolts* ongoing series by writer Sam Humphries and artist Ton Lima was announced. Following the release of the film Thunderbolts* (2025), it was announced in May 2025 that the series would be retitled to New Avengers (vol. 5); the first issue was released in June 2025.

== Fictional team biography ==
=== Baron Helmut Zemo's Thunderbolts ===
The Thunderbolts' true identities as the Masters of Evil are revealed. Art by Mark Bagley.

Baron Helmut Zemo puts out a call for any members of prior incarnations of the Masters of Evil to assist him in a rescue attempt of Goliath (his former bodyguard). Those who answer the call include Beetle, Fixer, Moonstone and Screaming Mimi. Surprised that so many of his former allies were still loyal to him, Zemo is inspired to resurrect the Masters of Evil once again. Before they can strike, the Avengers and the Fantastic Four are apparently killed by the villain Onslaught. With the Avengers and the Fantastic Four assumed dead, Zemo and the Masters of Evil pose as superheroes, taking new identities. Zemo becomes Citizen V, Beetle becomes MACH-1, Fixer becomes Techno, Goliath becomes Atlas, and Screaming Mimi becomes Songbird. The villain Moonstone is secretly freed from the Vault and added to the team by Zemo, acting as Zemo's personal enforcer against any betrayal committed by the others.

The team is successful as heroes and quickly gain the public's affection and trust. Unbeknownst to Zemo, his teammates began to see the value they could bring to the world as heroes and question the true mission of the Thunderbolts. Dallas Riordan, an aide to the Mayor of New York, becomes their closest ally.

Jolt, an Asian American teenage girl whose entire family was killed by Onslaught and was experimented on by Arnim Zola, joins the Thunderbolts after coming to the Baxter Building seeking the help of the Fantastic Four. Soon after Jolt joins the Thunderbolts, Techno's neck is broken in battle with the Elements of Doom. Techno transfers his mind into an android body built from his tech-pack.

Just as Zemo's plans are about to come to fruition, the Fantastic Four and the Avengers return. Faced with the return of the lost heroes, Zemo reveals the true nature of the Thunderbolts to the world, ostensibly to ensure the loyalty of the team by ruining their chances of becoming heroes. The Thunderbolts (minus Techno) turn on Zemo for his betrayal. Moonstone leaves the team, having had no intention of being a true hero. Now fugitives, the Thunderbolts are joined by Hawkeye and Charcoal.

Jack Monroe, brainwashed by Henry Peter Gyrich, becomes the new Scourge of the Underworld and seeks to destroy the Thunderbolts. He manages to apparently kill Jolt, Baron Zemo, Techno, and Atlas. All four manage to survive in some form. Following the Thunderbolts' apparent deaths, Valerie Cooper gathers a new group called the Redeemers, consisting of Smuggler, Beetle (Leila Devis), and Techno. The original Techno recovers in secret while the robotic Techno works in his place.

The Redeemers help the Thunderbolts battle Gyrich, who had acquired experimental nanite technology. Gyrich intends to use the nanites to kill every hero and villain on Earth. After learning that Gyrich had been infected with nanites and manipulated by Baron Strucker, Hawkeye tries to use this information as blackmail to get the Thunderbolts pardoned. Gyrich counters that he would tell the public himself about Strucker's scheme. Ultimately, Gyrich agrees to stay quiet and give the Thunderbolts their pardon. In return, Hawkeye turns himself in, resulting in the Thunderbolts disbanding.

==== Rebirth and endings ====
The Thunderbolts reformed to defeat Graviton. During the fight, several of the team members present (Fixer, Jolt, Moonstone, MACH-3, and Zemo) are transported to Counter-Earth. The Thunderbolts meet Counter-Earth versions of Heinrich Zemo, Helmut Zemo and the first Moonstone, the last of which was known as Phantom Eagle. Zemo convinces the team to help rebuild Counter-Earth. Moonstone steals Phantom Eagle's moonstone for herself, boosting her powers.

Meanwhile, Hawkeye escapes from prison and forms a second group of Thunderbolts with Songbird to oppose the Masters of Evil. Most of the members of the Crimson Cowl's Masters of Evil also join, including: Cardinal (now Harrier); Gypsy Moth (now Skein); Man-Killer (now Amazon); and Cyclone, who does not change his codename.

==== Avengers/Thunderbolts: The Best Intentions ====
In 2004, the six issue Avengers/Thunderbolts limited series was launched, picking up a year after the events of Thunderbolts #75. Zemo leads the Thunderbolts (now including Dallas Riordan, under the codename Vantage) in an attempt to drain the powers of all superhumans on Earth, using Moonstone. They battle the Avengers, including former Thunderbolt Hawkeye. Iron Man infiltrates the Thunderbolts disguised as Cobalt Man. Eventually, all the power absorbed by Moonstone caused her to snap. Iron Man convinces Hawkeye to lobotomize Moonstone to save the planet.

Zemo vows revenge against the Thunderbolts and the Avengers for putting Moonstone into a coma. Jolt returns to Counter-Earth, while Fixer flees, Vantage retires, and Blackheath returns to prison. Songbird is offered reserve membership in the Avengers, but turns it down. MACH-3 is paroled from prison and forms a new team of Thunderbolts.

=== The New Thunderbolts ===
Marvel subsequently launched New Thunderbolts #1. MACH-3 (now called MACH-IV), Atlas and Songbird join the new Thunderbolts. The team's new recruits include Photon, Speed Demon, Joystick, Blizzard, and Radioactive Man.

Fixer recruits MACH-IV and Blizzard to work with him on a secret project run by Zemo. Meanwhile, Speed Demon is confronted by Doctor Spectrum, who intends to reform the Squadron Sinister and take over the world. Speed Demon quits the Thunderbolts to join Spectrum while Nighthawk, a member of the original Squadron Sinister, joins the Thunderbolts.

Soon after Nighthawk joins the team, the Thunderbolts discover that Photon will destroy the universe in the future. As they try to come to terms with this, they are attacked by a Moonstone puppeteered by Zemo to kill Photon. When the initial strike failed, the remainder of Zemo's team reveal themselves to the Thunderbolts. Zemo explains that he had used the Moonstones to accelerate Photon's return from death, and in the process made the mistake of siphoning energy from the beginning and end of time itself, caused by inexperience with his Moonstones, creating a link between Photon and the universe that threatens to end existence. Unable to find a way to save both Photon and the universe, Zemo cuts Photon's body up and banishes him to the Darkforce dimension to prevent him from returning.

==== Civil War: Hero Hunters ====
At the beginning of the superhero Civil War, the Thunderbolts are recruited to battle super-villains, capture them and offer them a choice: join the Thunderbolts or go to prison. All of the villains choose to join the Thunderbolts. Zemo saves the Wellspring of Power from the Grandmaster, who plans to use it for his own ends. Believing that all of his visions were subject to the flow of time, and that nothing was set in stone, Zemo defeats the Grandmaster and takes his power. However, Songbird cracks the moonstones, sending Zemo into a whirlwind of cosmic time/space.

Venom, Lady Deathstrike, Taskmaster, Bullseye, Jester, and Jack O'Lantern join Songbird to hunt down Anti-Registration heroes, but never officially saw any real combat. Jester and Jack O'Lantern were later killed by the Punisher.

After the events surrounding the Wellspring, the current team disbands. MACH-IV and Fixer are offered jobs by the Commission on Superhuman Activities. Blizzard is released from jail and leaves the team. Atlas is de-ionized after his encounter with the Wellspring, but left catatonic and trapped in an enlarged state. Joystick is imprisoned for her traitorous actions during the Wellspring debacle and Speed Demon escapes arrest. Songbird, Moonstone, Swordsman, and Radioactive Man remain on the team.

=== Norman Osborn's Thunderbolts ===
Thunderbolts #110 featured a new creative team (writer Warren Ellis and artist Mike Deodato) and a new roster and direction for the team. The team was formed under the control of Norman Osborn, and the majority of the roster was made up of villains wishing to redeem themselves. The new Thunderbolts roster is led by Osborn and consists of field leader Moonstone, Bullseye, Penance, Radioactive Man, Songbird, Swordsman, and Venom. After the events of Civil War, the new Thunderbolts were tasked with tracking down and arresting individuals avoiding the Superhuman Registration Act. Songbird later assumes control over the team and expands the group's missions to involve regular missions besides hunting down unregistered heroes.

Due to lengthy delays towards the end of Ellis's run, several one-shot specials and a Penance limited series were launched to fill in the gap. The Penance limited series saw Penance carrying out a complex scheme hatched to gain revenge against Nitro, who had killed his teammates in the New Warriors. Several specials advanced other plotlines, such as the mysterious death of Songbird's mother and Swordsman betraying the Thunderbolts by allying with Arnim Zola to resurrect his sister Andrea after realizing that Osborn would not help him.

Following the events of "Caged Angels" (written by Christos Gage), and the Penance limited series, and guest appearances in Moon Knight and The Amazing Spider-Man, the group was thrust into the events of "Secret Invasion", where they help fend off the Skrull invasion. Andrea realizes that she was a clone, culminating in Bullseye murdering her to save Moonstone.

=== H.A.M.M.E.R.'s Thunderbolts ===
After Songbird gets mad at Osborn for leaving her to deal with a dangerous Skrull who nearly killed her, Osborn and Moonstone agree to get rid of Songbird and the other Thunderbolts whose morals do not match their own. Their plan comes into effect while Osborn is in Washington during the Dark Reign storyline, preparing to assume control over S.H.I.E.L.D. The group has Radioactive Man deported back to China after Osborn has his work visa revoked, and Moonstone has Penance sent to life imprisonment in a mental institution. Moonstone then aids Bullseye and Venom in attempting to kill Songbird, with Bullseye and Moonstone inadvertently and indirectly revealing to Songbird that Osborn has given them permission to kill her. Though she neutralizes Moonstone and Bullseye, Venom attacks Songbird on the Zeus minijet; she barely survives the crash. Bullseye recovers and sneaks up on her after the wreck, but Swordsman saves her and tells her to run away, while blowing up the downed craft to forge her death in the explosion.

Swordsman confronts Osborn with the revelation that he is not being offered a position on the Dark Avengers team and that Osborn had never planned on fulfilling his vow to resurrect the Thunderbolt's deceased sister or to give him a full presidential pardon after his contract with the Thunderbolts ended. Osborn ends the confrontation by stabbing and defenestrating him.

With Bullseye, Moonstone, and Venom being transferred to Osborn's new team, the Dark Avengers, Osborn decided to create a new Thunderbolts roster, consisting of field leader Scourge, Black Widow, Ghost, Paladin, Headsman, Ant-Man, Grizzly, and Mister X. Most of the team is later apprehended by authorities, while Paladin and Ant-Man escape.

=== Luke Cage's Thunderbolts ===
A brand new team of Thunderbolts appears in the aftermath of "Siege" as seen during the Heroic Age storyline. Steve Rogers brings Luke Cage to the Raft to assemble a new team of Thunderbolts that will not be related to the ones that Norman Osborn previously assembled and rather be criminals who work towards redemption again. They recruit Ghost, Moonstone, Juggernaut, Crossbones, and Man-Thing. During their first training session, Cage is attacked by Baron Helmut Zemo, who declares that he will take leadership of the Thunderbolts. He tells the Thunderbolts that they can serve him if they can escape from the Raft. Though Crossbones is more than willing to oblige, the rest are suspicious. As it turns out, it was a setup to test the team and the Raft's security measures. They are then deployed to deal with a group of Asgardian trolls.

After slaying the mutated S.H.I.E.L.D. agents and sealing off the cave, the Thunderbolts return to the Raft for a check-up. The check-up reveals that Crossbones has not been mutated by the Terrigen Mist and that MACH-V will be out for weeks. The facility is soon visited by the staff and students of Avengers Academy. After getting Thunderbolts introduced to the students, the prison's power grid suddenly shut down due to an EMP, allowing the Raft's inmates to escape. However, they are soon detained.

Following the discharge of Crossbones, the Thunderbolts end up getting Hyperion as a new member. He betrays the Thunderbolts while they are split up, destroying Man-Thing's lower body and legs with his atomic vision and leaving Moonstone and Songbird to drown while he takes the com device which controls the nanites in each Thunderbolts member. Hyperion activates it on Juggernaut to test it after the latter had saved the two drowning members, and Juggernaut responds by fighting back. Moonstone and Ghost join in to help Juggernaut, upon which they take down Hyperion. They let Man-Thing touch him after a fallen Hyperion shows fear in front of them. The Thunderbolts next recruit Satana as his replacement when Luke Cage and Doctor Strange discover that the Raft is susceptible to magic.

With recent events involving the Thunderbolts, the team's advisory committee approves the creation of a Beta team, the Underbolts. As the Thunderbolts head toward a new mission in Eastern Europe, Songbird, Mach V, and Fixer select candidates of Raft inmates, with the chosen candidates being Troll, Shocker, Centurius, Boomerang and Mister Hyde.

=== Red Hulk's Thunderbolts ===
A new team composed of Red Hulk, Deadpool, Elektra, Agent Venom, and Punisher debuted as a part of Marvel NOW! major relaunch. The series is written by Daniel Way with drawings by Steve Dillon. This incarnation is not a government-sponsored team. Red Hulk obtains Samuel Sterns' body and hooks it up to a machine that imbues him with red gamma radiation. Deadpool later finds Sterns transformed into Red Leader with no apparent powers. Punisher shoots Sterns between the eyes, disrupting whatever plans Red Hulk has for him. However, Red Hulk absorbs more gamma radiation and forcefully gives it to Leader, bringing him back to life.

The Team decides that they cannot do only missions for Red Hulk, as none truly trust him, so a system of give and take missions is developed, in which the team does a mission for Red Hulk, then a mission for a random member. The first random name pulled for a member is Punisher, who chooses a mission to take out a crime family in New York. It turns out the Leader purposefully tricked the team into letting him pick the next mission, since he had no skin in the game, so he can escape. While trying to escape the team's submarine, Red Leader has his brain siphoned by Supergiant, but is saved by Red Hulk. Red Leader starts having visions of how to kill every member of the Team, but determines that something is wrong with his plan; there was an unseen variable that stopped him from succeeding. That variable presents itself mainly in the form of Mercy, who joined Ross's Thunderbolts team as a condition for her release. Ghost Rider joins the team to stop Mercy, who is getting too powerful to control, but inadvertently drags the team to hell. Leader negotiates a contract with Mephisto to put him back in power of the Underworld by overthrowing the current leader of hell, Strong Guy. Strong Guy throws the fight, so the Thunderbolts escape, and Mercy is dragged to hell.

Much later, the team tracks down Doctor Faustus, who Punisher intends to kill for murdering all the children in a high school. Red Hulk stops him and wants to recruit Faustus, but the Punisher does not like the idea and quits the team. While going to the refrigerator at his safe house, the Punisher found a bomb with a note saying, "You don't quit on us. You're fired." Angered, the Punisher believes Red Hulk set the bomb and began hunting down his former teammates. The Avengers and Thunderbolts arrest the Leader, after which Red Hulk disbands the team.

=== Winter Soldier's Thunderbolts ===
The Winter Soldier (Bucky Barnes) forms his own Thunderbolts team following the events of the Avengers: Standoff! storyline, which consists of Fixer, Atlas, Moonstone, MACH-X, and Kobik. Winter Soldier, Kobik, and MACH-X helped Fixer, Atlas, and Moonstone evade S.H.I.E.L.D. In exchange, they agree to form the Thunderbolts with the mission to make sure that S.H.I.E.L.D. never uses the Kobik Project again.

Over the course of this 12-issue run, Barnes's Thunderbolts team clashes with the All-New Inhumans, the Squadron Supreme, mysterious alien invaders, and others. They also frequently test the limits of Kobik's reality-bending cosmic powers.

Following the "Civil War II" event, the team reunites with Songbird as they rescue Barnes from an altered, secretly fascist Captain America. She remains with the team, briefly reigniting her romance with Abner Jenkins (MACH-X). In the lead-up to the "Secret Empire" event, Zemo attacks the Thunderbolts' base with the latest incarnation of the Masters of Evil, with MACH-X being presumed dead. Zemo makes a nefarious offer to the original Thunderbolts members: give in to their darker natures and join the new rise of Hydra... or die. MACH-X and Songbird reject the offer, but Fixer, Moonstone, and Atlas ultimately leave the ruins of the HQ with Zemo's Masters of Evil.

=== Punisher: War on the Streets ===
After losing custody of Frank Castle in the fledgling country of Bagalia, Baron Zemo and Jigsaw flee to New York City. There, Zemo approaches Mayor Wilson Fisk in hopes of joining forces and finally taking revenge on the Punisher. Fearing a public relations disaster, Fisk reluctantly agrees, but is promptly dismayed when Zemo reveals a new team of Thunderbolts at a mayoral press conference. Zemo's new Thunderbolts team includes: Moonstone, Ghost, Fixer, Radioactive Man, and Jigsaw.

=== Mayor Wilson Fisk's Thunderbolts ===
During the events of "King in Black", Mayor Wilson Fisk assembles a new group of Thunderbolts to combat Knull's invasion of Earth. This group consists of Taskmaster, Mister Fear, Batroc the Leaper, Rhino, Star, Ampere, and Snakehead.

Norman Osborn and the Thunderbolts make their way through Ravencroft amidst the Symbiote attacks, meeting with Figment, Foolkiller, Grizzly, Man-Bull, and Mister Hyde. Osborn leads the Thunderbolts into retrieving Sentry's corpse so that it can be used as a nuke to destroy Knull's lair. Taskmaster uses Figment's abilities to make it look like the Thunderbolts sacrificed their lives to pull off the mission. After Fisk broadcasts the Thunderbolts' sacrifice during the fight against the Symbiote invasion, the Thunderbolts arrive and blackmail him into raising their pay and giving them further missions once Knull is defeated.

==== Devil's Reign ====
During the "Devil's Reign" storyline, Wilson Fisk sets up the expanded Thunderbolts units to help crack down on superhuman vigilantism. This group consists of Agony, Electro, Rhino, U.S. Agent, Doctor Octopus, Crossbones, Kraven the Hunter, Coachwhip, Puff Adder, and Abomination. Following Kingpin's defeat, Mayor Luke Cage deals with the remainder of the Thunderbolts units who were loyal to Fisk. Cage plans to have Hawkeye lead and reform the Thunderbolts.

=== Hawkeye's Thunderbolts ===
Hawkeye is eventually chosen to lead the Thunderbolts with America Chavez, Power Man, Persuasion, and a new character named Gutsen Glory, whose background is classified. Their first mission has them apprehending Abomination, Agony, Electro, Taskmaster, and Whiplash, who broke out of a prison transport and were holding hostages. Hawkeye takes on U.S. Agent, who claims that he is still working for the government.

=== The Revolution's Thunderbolts ===
Following the events of the Captain America: Cold War storyline, Bucky Barnes becomes the Outer Circle's New Revolution and inherits the shadowy organization's decades of valuable intel after dissolving it. With these resources at his disposal, the Revolution meets with Contessa Valentina Allegra de Fontaine (later revealed to be a Life Model Decoy of the original) to form a new Thunderbolts team to eliminate the Red Skull and his enterprises. The two recruit the Destroyer and Red Guardian to raid the Red Skull's base in Argentina, where they succeed in killing his host body and propagandist mouthpiece Aleksander Lukin. When the Red Skull's fortune is acquired by Wilson Fisk, Revolution, and new recruits Black Widow and White Widow infiltrate a party hosted by the Hellfire Club and leave the Skull's Nazi gold trapped in an inaccessible pocket dimension.

=== Thunderbolts: Doomstrike ===
During the "One World Under Doom" storyline, Doctor Doom retaliates against Bucky Barnes by destroying his hometown of Shelbyville and framing him for the attack. As he assumes control of the rest of the world, Doom reveals his own version of the Thunderbolts called the Fulgar Victoris. This team is led by Valentina Allegra de Fontaine (in a new Citizen V alias) and consists of original Thunderbolts Atlas, Fixer, and Moonstone, as well as a cyborg based on Abner Jenkins called MACH-Doom.

With help from the last remaining original Thunderbolt, Songbird, plus U.S. Agent, Sharon Carter, Captain America, and Ghost Rider, Barnes discovers a Doom plot to steal a major cache of vibranium—and ultimately defeats Valentina and her team trying to carry it out. Fixer defects to Barnes's side in the end and he activates the "Doombot Protocol Fixer Omega Daffodil" to shut down the Doombots running the vibranium heist.

Barnes then goes on to lead a new team, the New Avengers.

== Slogan ==
Justice, like lightning, ever should appear to few men's ruin, but to all men's fear.

The series' slogan, "Justice, Like Lightning..." was attributed to a poem by Thomas Randolph in Thunderbolts #1. However, upon further investigation, Kurt Busiek could not find any evidence that this phrase had actually appeared in Thomas Randolph's writings. Busiek himself had originally taken the slogan from the Roy Thomas-penned issues of Captain Marvel, where the quote was similarly attributed to Randolph.

The quote is frequently attributed to Joseph Swetnam, but this was not Swetnam himself, but rather a character based on him in the 1620 play Swetnam the Woman-Hater Arraigned by Women, which was written by an unknown author. Busiek reports that one Thunderbolts fan located a version of the couplet attributed to Irish archbishop Milo Sweetman, who died in 1380.

== Reception ==
=== Accolades ===
- In 2020, CBR.com ranked the Thunderbolts tenth in their "Marvel: 10 Most Powerful Teams" list.
- In 2021, CBR.com ranked the Thunderbolts third in their "Marvel: 10 Characters Baron Zemo Created In The Comics" list.
- In 2022, CBR.com ranked the Thunderbolts second in their "10 Marvel Teams That Exceeded Expectations" list.

== Other versions ==
=== Contest of Champions ===
An alternate universe iteration of the Thunderbolts appears in Contest of Champions, consisting of Spider-Man, Invisible Woman, Goliath, and Punisher. This version of the group originate from a universe where Iron Man and his Pro-Registration forces won the superhero civil war. The members of Captain America's Anti-Registration forces buy time off their sentence with suicide missions from the government, similar to DC's Suicide Squad. After a fight breaks out between the Thunderbolts, the Mighty Avengers, and the Renegade Champions, Iron Man kills Captain America and reveals that he used the Reality Gem to rig the war in his favor. Iron Man attempts to use the Gem on Battleworld to achieve a similar feat, but the Gem proves to be powerless outside its own universe. Iron Man and the Punisher are swiftly killed by Maestro. The surviving Mighty Avengers and Thunderbolts dub themselves the Civil Warriors.

=== Millennial Visions ===
In the story "Thunderbolts: Give a Guy a Break", in the Marvel Universe: Millennial Visions one-shot (set in Earth-22000), the Thunderbolts revolt against Zemo, and Hawkeye leads them to be true heroes, bringing in and converting other villains.

=== Spider-Verse ===
An alternate universe iteration of the Thunderbolts appears in Spider-Verse. This version of the group are allies of Norman Osborn who are equipped with the universe's version of the Venom Symbiote, Variable Engagement Neuro-sensitive Organic Mesh (V.E.N.O.M.).

=== Wolverine: Days of Future Past ===
In the limited series Wolverine: Days of Future Past, the Thunderbolts are the private security force of the ruling Sentinels, under the command of Baron Zemo. However, Zemo is also secretly working with Shinobi Shaw and Psylocke as part of a new Hellfire Club to bring about the Sentinels' downfall.

=== Old Man Logan ===
In Old Man Hawkeye, a prequel to Old Man Logan, Baron Zemo coerced the Thunderbolts into betraying the Avengers and allying with the villains, killing nearly every hero except for Hawkeye.

== In other media ==
=== Television ===
- A loose depiction of Norman Osborn's Thunderbolts appears in the Ultimate Spider-Man episode "New Warriors". This version of the group is a team of young superhumans established by Taskmaster and consists of Cloak and Dagger and the Vulture, with the Green Goblin as a silent benefactor. The Thunderbolts raid the S.H.I.E.L.D. Tri-Carrier to break the Goblin out of their custody, though they and the Sinister Six end up fighting Spider-Man and the New Warriors. In the aftermath, Cloak and Dagger defect to Spider-Man's side, and Taskmaster is apprehended, though the Vulture and the Goblin escape.
- Baron Helmut Zemo's Thunderbolts appear in Avengers Assemble, consisting of Citizen V, MACH-IV, Songbird, Atlas, Meteorite, and Techno. Similarly to the comics, this version of the group is the Masters of Evil, who use an inversion stabilizer to disguise themselves and masquerade as superheroes. Throughout their self-titled episode and "Thunderbolts Revealed", the Thunderbolts work with the Avengers until a suspicious Hawkeye discovers the Thunderbolts' true identities. In the ensuing fight, Captain America saves and convinces Songbird to legitimately become a hero and convince her teammates to expose Zemo and turn on him. Though Zemo escapes, Hawkeye advises the remaining Thunderbolts to turn themselves in and work towards becoming official heroes once they serve their time.
- A band inspired by the Thunderbolts called "Screaming Mimi and the Thunderbolts" appears in the Marvel Rising short "Battle of the Bands", led by Melissa Gold and consisting of Atlas, Jolt, and Moonstone look-alikes.

=== Film ===
A loose depiction of the Thunderbolts appear in Thunderbolts* (2025), consisting of Bucky Barnes (Sebastian Stan), Ava Starr / Ghost (Hannah John-Kamen), John Walker / U.S. Agent (Wyatt Russell), Yelena Belova (Florence Pugh), and Alexei Shostakov / Red Guardian (David Harbour). This version of the team is formed by Valentina Allegra de Fontaine (Julia Louis-Dreyfuss), who later rebrands them as the government-sanctioned New Avengers.

=== Video games ===
- The Thunderbolts appear in Marvel: Ultimate Alliance 2, consisting of Penance, Songbird, Venom, and the Green Goblin.
- The original Thunderbolts appear in Lego Marvel's Avengers as part of a self-titled DLC pack, consisting of Citizen V, Atlas, Jolt, Techno, MACH-V, Meteorite, and Songbird.

=== Miscellaneous ===
- The Thunderbolts co-starred with the Avengers in the original prose fiction novel Avengers and the Thunderbolts, written by Pierce Askegren and published by Berkley (259 pages, paperback, January 1999, ISBN 978-0-425-16675-8).
- Action figures of Songbird, Citizen V, MACH-I, and Boomerang as Thunderbolts have all been released as part of Hasbro's Marvel Legends line.

== See also ==
- Suicide Squad – DC Comics' equivalent to the Thunderbolts team
