= Troll (Marvel Comics) =

Publication information
- Publisher: Marvel Comics
- First appearance: Thunderbolts #145 (August 2010)
- Created by: Jeff Parker; Kevin Walker

In-story information
- Alter ego: Gunna Sijurvald
- Species: Asgardian/Troll Hybrid
- Team affiliations: Thunderbolts
- Abilities: Super-strength

Troll (Gunna Sijurvald) is a fictional character appearing in American comic books published by Marvel Comics.

== Publication history ==
The character first appeared in Thunderbolts #145 (August 2010) and was created by writer Jeff Parker and artist Kevin Walker.

She has appeared as a regular character in Thunderbolts since issue #157, and has remained with the team since the title transitioned into Dark Avengers beginning with issue #175.

== Fictional character biography ==
Troll is the offspring of an Asgardian mother and a male member of the Magzi Troll tribe. She was originally held prisoner in Asgard until her cell was destroyed during the Siege of Asgard. Apprehended by the Thunderbolts, Troll is placed in a cell on the Raft despite Valkyrie requesting that she be returned to Asgard. Luke Cage advises Songbird to orientate Gunna for the duration of her stay and more importantly, teach her not to eat anybody. During a prison riot in which the power was knocked out, Gunna saves Songbird from a group of female prisoners.

After Gunna gets into a fight with a trio of male prisoners, one of the Raft's guards decides that she is too powerful to be held in a juvenile facility, but too young to continue staying in the Raft. Gunna is recruited into a backup Thunderbolts team that will operate if the primary team is killed.

Gunna and several other inmates of the Raft are transported throughout time due to the teleportation technology within Thunderbolts Tower failing. First, they end up in the time of World War II, where they work with the Invaders to battle Nazi forces. The group is later transported to Victorian London, the time of King Arthur, and the era of the original Thunderbolts team, before returning to the present.

When the Mother Parasite plots to take over the world, Troll assists the Young Avengers in fighting the Mother Parasite, as children and those who are young at heart can see the Mother Parasite's machinations.

== Powers and abilities ==
Troll has been shown to have superhuman strength, displayed by bending the metal bars on her jail cell and wielding a battle-axe that mortal men find impossible to lift. She appears to have the ability to call the axe to her mentally as shown when she fought an army of Doombots in Latveria.
