= Mister Hyde (Marvel Comics) =

Marvel Comics supervillain

Calvin Zabo Mister Hyde
- Calvin Zabo transforming into Mister Hyde as depicted on the cover of The Amazing Spider-Man #232 (September 1982). Art by John Romita Jr.

Publication information
- Publisher: Marvel Comics
- First appearance: Journey into Mystery #99 (December 1963)
- Created by: Stan Lee (writer); Don Heck (artist)

In-story information
- Alter ego: Calvin Zabo
- Species: Human mutate
- Team affiliations: Masters of Evil; Lethal Legion; Thunderbolts
- Partnerships: Scorpion; Batroc; Cobra; Jester
- Notable aliases: Edward Hyde; Mister Hyde
- Abilities: Genius-level intellect; Hydra formula granting: Superhuman strength, stamina, and durability; Accelerated healing

Mister Hyde (Calvin Zabo) is a supervillain appearing in American comic books published by Marvel Comics. Created by writer Stan Lee and artist Don Heck, the character first appeared in Journey into Mystery #99 (December 1963). Calvin Zabo is a supervillain known under the codename of Mister Hyde and has been a known collaborator of Cobra. He is the father of the superhero Daisy Johnson. The character has also been a member of the Masters of Evil.

Calvin Zabo appeared in the second season of the television series Agents of S.H.I.E.L.D., portrayed by Kyle MacLachlan.

== Development ==
=== Concept and creation ===
Calvin Zabo / Mister Hyde is inspired by Dr. Jekyll and Mr. Hyde from the 1886 Gothic novella Strange Case of Dr Jekyll and Mr Hyde written by Robert Louis Stevenson.

=== Publication history ===
Calvin Zabo debuted in Journey into Mystery #99 (December 1963), created by Stan Lee and Don Heck. He has appeared as a regular character in Thunderbolts since issue #157, and remained with the team after the title transitioned into Dark Avengers beginning with issue #176.

== Fictional character biography ==
Calvin Zabo was born in Trenton, New Jersey and becomes a morally abject but brilliant biochemist who discovered the effects of hormones on human physiology. His favorite storybook was Stevenson's 1886 classic, Strange Case of Dr Jekyll and Mr Hyde. He convinced himself that the experiment Dr. Jekyll performed in the story could actually be accomplished and became obsessed with the idea of unleashing his full bestial nature in a superhuman form.

However, he needed money to do this, so he robbed his various employers systematically. Though too intelligent to be caught, the medical community became suspicious, due to his tendency of always getting employed by organizations which were subsequently robbed. Zabo eventually sought work as a surgeon in the hospital where Donald Blake worked as a directing physician, yet Blake would not allow him that job due to his history. Zabo became so enraged that Blake would not give him the position, even though he did intend to rob the organization, and swore revenge. He eventually became successful in creating his formula and turned himself into a creature with superhuman strength who is dubbed Mister Hyde.

Hyde becomes a full-time professional supervillain and works with Cobra in a failed attempt to get revenge upon Thor. Following a series of defeats, Cobra escapes from Ryker's Island, leaving Hyde behind. With Batroc the Leaper, Hyde blackmails New York City with a hijacked supertanker and attempts to destroy the entire city to kill Cobra. Eventually, he is defeated by Captain America with Batroc's aid.

Hyde joins Helmut Zemo's incarnation of the Masters of Evil and invades Avengers Mansion along with them, torturing Black Knight and Edwin Jarvis. With Goliath and the Wrecking Crew, he nearly kills Hercules, but is defeated by the Avengers.

After Spider-Man publicly reveals his identity during the "Civil War" storyline, Zabo sought to recreate the circumstances of Spider-Man's "birth", by taking in orphans off the street, imbuing them with spider-powers, and seeing whether or not the teenagers would give in to their darker impulses. During the ensuing battle with Spider-Man, Hyde pulls webbing off his face, taking his eyelids with it, and is hit in the face with hydrochloric acid. Curt Connors is later seen aiding Spider-Man in curing Zabo's test subjects.

Hyde works with Boomerang, Tiger Shark, and Whirlwind to manipulate Venom into procuring Norman Osborn's fortunes. This is thwarted by Venom and Green Goblin as Osborn throws a bomb into Hyde's mouth. Osborn warns Hyde and the other villains that if they ever cross him again, he will kill everyone that they ever loved before they are tortured to death. Hyde later joins the Grim Reaper's new Lethal Legion, claiming embarrassment over the previous incident.

Hyde is selected to be a part of the "beta team" of the Thunderbolts, alongside Boomerang, Shocker, Gunna, and Centurius.

Hyde begins operating a drug operation in California, where he came into conflict with Robbie Reyes after his car had some of Hyde's pills inside. Hyde's mercenaries chase Reyes down during the race to retrieve the car and the pills. Reyes is gunned down by the mercenaries when he mistakes them for police and they torch the scene. Reyes is revived as a demonic being called the Ghost Rider and defeats Zabo, becoming something of a local hero and urban legend. Having regrouped and refined his Hyde formula into new blue pills, Zabo gradually takes over the L.A. criminal underground with his "Blue Hyde Brigade".

During the "Secret Empire", Hyde joins Helmut Zemo's Army of Evil. Amidst Hydra's takeover of the United States, Hyde is one of a few Army of Evil members who escape being kept in stasis. He alongside Hydra's Avengers catch his daughter Daisy and her team the Secret Warriors. During interrogation, Daisy destroys the Helicarrier they are in, forcing Hyde to retreat.

== Powers and abilities ==
The process that transforms Calvin Zabo into his Mister Hyde persona are growth hormones caused by ingestion of a chemical formula. As his body adjusted to its new form, Hyde's strength, stamina, durability, and healing were all boosted to uncommon levels. Hyde's powers are so sufficient that he can stand up and face Joe Fixit in a fight. He was shown tearing apart an armored car door with ease. Through further experimental procedures over the years, his abilities have been increased beyond their original limits. Zabo must consume his special serum periodically for him to remain as one identity from another. However, mental stress or pain could impair this transformation into Hyde. He employs a wristwatch-like device supplied with the formula that injects itself directly into his bloodstream, thus enabling to transform himself by button pushing.

Due to the nature of these transformations, Hyde's skin is warped. This gives his face a distorted look reminiscent of Lon Chaney's make-up used in The Phantom of the Opera.

Zabo is also an intelligent research scientist with a Ph.D. in medicine and biochemistry. When assuming his Hyde form, he loses those skills.

== Reception ==
Marc Buxton of Den of Geek ranked Mister Hyde 15th in their "Marvel’s 31 Best Monsters" list and called him a "monstrous force worthy of his classic monster namesake."

== Other versions ==
=== Age of Apocalypse ===
An alternate universe version of Mister Hyde appears in Age of Apocalypse. This version is a feral, cannibalistic scavenger who is known to prowl graveyards and attack anyone entering his territory.

=== Elseworlds ===
Mister Hyde appears in the Elseworlds crossover comic book Daredevil/Batman: Eye for an Eye.

=== House of M ===
An alternate universe version of Mister Hyde appears in "House of M" as a member of the Hood's Masters of Evil.

=== Marvel Zombies ===
A zombified Mister Hyde appears in Marvel Zombies 4, where he is killed by Man-Thing.

=== Thor: The Mighty Avenger ===
Mister Hyde is the antagonist of the first two issues of this alternate universe retelling of Thor's origin. Thor, confused and partially amnesiac, stops Hyde from hassling an innocent woman. This drives Hyde into an obsession with Thor's new friend, Jane Foster.

== In other media ==
=== Television ===
- Calvin Zabo / Mister Hyde appears in The Marvel Super Heroes, voiced by Henry Comor.
- Calvin Johnson appears in the second season of Agents of S.H.I.E.L.D., portrayed by Kyle MacLachlan. This version, initially known as the "Doctor", uses a formula described as being primarily composed of "anabolic-androgenic steroids, a liver enzyme blocker, various metabolic enhancers, methamphetamines, gorilla testosterone, and a drop of peppermint", with a minimum of one milligram of adrenaline being required to achieve its full effect. Additionally, he is the husband of an Inhuman named Jiaying. Throughout his appearances, Johnson joins forces with Jiaying to seek revenge on Daniel Whitehall for dissecting her and S.H.I.E.L.D. for denying him his revenge until he eventually realizes the error of his ways and kills Jiaying to save Daisy Johnson from her. Following this, Phil Coulson alters Johnson's memory, which allows him to start over with a new identity and take up work as a veterinarian named Winslow. In the fourth season, Glenn Talbot and a group of scientists recreate Johnson's formula and use it to empower Jeffrey Mace as part of "Project: Patriot".

=== Video games ===
- Calvin Zabo / Mister Hyde appears as a boss in Iron Man and X-O Manowar in Heavy Metal, voiced by Tim Jones.
- Calvin Zabo / Mister Hyde appears as a boss and playable character in Marvel Avengers Alliance 2.
- Calvin Zabo / Mister Hyde appears as a boss in Marvel Heroes. The Lizard breaks him out of prison to keep his human side dormant. In exchange, Zabo injects the Lizard with his Hyde formula to make him stronger and so they can combine their respective formulas and poison the Bronx Zoo's water supply to create reptilian-animal hybrids, only to be defeated by the players.
- Cal Johnson / Mister Hyde appears as a playable character in Lego Marvel's Avengers via the "Agents of S.H.I.E.L.D." DLC.
