= Ghost (Marvel Comics) =

Marvel Comics character

- Ghost as depicted in The Amazing Spider-Man #16 (May 2015). Art by Humberto Ramos.

Publication information
- Publisher: Marvel Comics
- First appearance: Iron Man #219 (June 1987)
- Created by: David Michelinie; Bob Layton

In-story information
- Alter ego: Unknown
- Team affiliations: Roxxon Energy Corporation; A.I.M. Thunderbolts
- Notable aliases: Phantasm; Casper
- Abilities: Genius-level intellect; Brilliant inventor, tactician, and computer hacker; Skilled marksman; Battle suit grants: Stealth technology; Intangibility; Invisibility

Ghost is a character appearing in American comic books published by Marvel Comics. Created by David Michelinie and Bob Layton, the character first appeared in Iron Man #219 (June 1987). Ghost is a genius inventor and hacker who wears a battle suit that allows him to become invisible and intangible. Although he started out as an adversary of the superhero Iron Man, Ghost has also been depicted as an antihero and member of the Thunderbolts during the events of "Dark Reign" and "Heroic Age".

The character has been substantially adapted from the comics into various forms of media, including animated television series and video games. Hannah John-Kamen portrays a gender flipped version of the character named Ava Starr in the Marvel Cinematic Universe (MCU) films Ant-Man and the Wasp (2018), Thunderbolts* (2025) and the upcoming Avengers: Doomsday (2026). A reimagined version of the MCU Ghost made her comic debut in 2025.

== Publication history ==
Created by David Michelinie and Bob Layton, the character first appeared in Iron Man #219 (June 1987). The character was introduced during Michelinie and Layton's second run on Iron Man, which also produced the "Armor Wars" storyline, with pencils by M.D. Bright.

== Fictional character biography ==
Ghost (real name unknown) once worked as a programmer and an engineer at the IT company Omnisapient. Impressing the board of directors with his technological prowess and genius intellect, he quickly rose up the ranks and assumed the company's flagship project for which he developed a revolutionary processor that could physically change in reaction to its environment, becoming intangible. Thanks to his Ghost Tech, the company's stock skyrocketed while the board collected the credit. Exhausted after months of work, Ghost decided to leave on vacation, conflicting with the board of directors' expectations for an ahead-of-schedule launch that could increase their profit margins significantly. Approached by his co-worker as he was about to leave, Ghost cancelled his travel plans and began a relationship with her. Happier and more productive than ever, he now found every single aspect of his life tied to the company until his lover died in an explosion at her apartment. Ghost sought solace by integrating his technology into his body, which he used to uncover that his lover had been hired by the board to seduce him and was murdered for blackmailing them. Terrified, Ghost attempted to flee, but his discoveries had been detected by the board of directors, who dispatched a contract killer after him. The hitman detonated a bomb in his apartment before he could leave, destroying the entire building and killing dozens of tenants. Ghost survived, becoming intangible via his technology. Ghost became a vigilante bent on wiping out corporatocracy. He took revenge upon the board of directors, butchering them, along with their contract killer, and erasing all records of his previous life.

=== The Accutech Merger ===
Sometime after this, Ghost is hired by Carrington Pax, a leading executive of the Roxxon Oil Corporation, to destroy Accutech Research and Development. Accutech had been trying to develop a beta particle generator and when they refused to sell it to Roxxon, Ghost was hired to drive Accutech into bankruptcy. Tony Stark is interested in acquiring Accutech's technology and buys out the company. Investigating a disturbance at the new facility as Iron Man, he first encounters Ghost, who swears revenge against Stark. When Pax and the other executives at Roxxon learn that Ghost has gone rogue, they fear his actions would make the company look bad, so they hire Spymaster to take care of him. After a fierce battle at Stark Enterprises, Ghost kills Spymaster. (Note: It was shown years later in the pages of Dark Reign: Made Men #1 that Spymaster had faked his death.) Iron Man confronts Ghost in a room with a beta particle generator, which interferes with Ghost's suit and will prove fatal with prolonged exposure. As Ghost tries to reach the generator to destroy it, he falls through the floor and is presumed dead.

=== Unholy Ghost ===
Ghost resurfaces plaguing a company in Italy, owned by Justin Hammer. The shrewd industrialist intended to sell the company, Electronica Fabbrizi, to Tony Stark, ridding him of a dangerous enemy and a useless asset. After Tony Stark discovers the true ownership of the floundering company, he agrees to work with Hammer to take down Ghost. When Ghost confronts Hammer, he learns that Hammer had developed defenses against Ghost's technology. After escaping, Ghost vows to continue his crusade against Hammer and other companies.

=== "Dark Reign" ===
During the "Dark Reign" storyline, Ghost seems to have become more unhinged and reclusive. With the Thunderbolts officially disbanded, Norman Osborn recruits Ghost for his new Thunderbolts, now a black ops team under Osborn's direct control. Ghost betrays Osborn by sending a data package to whatever heroes could receive it, warning them of Osborn's plans to capture Odin's spear Gungnir. Aware of the emergency, Quicksilver crosses the Atlantic Ocean and retrieves Gungnir.

=== "Stark Disassembled" ===
Because Tony Stark had purposely lobotomized himself into a vegetative state, and had his power of attorney transferred over to Donald Blake, Madame Masque hired Ghost to kill Stark. She provided him a phone made by the Tinkerer, which he could use to execute his phase abilities to reach any place in the world. Ghost managed to track Stark to Broxton, Oklahoma, where he twice attempted to assassinate Stark. All the while, Stark's comrades were attempting to reboot his brain. By then, Stark had regained consciousness and used Ghost's own phone against him, sending him to a facility in Seoul.

=== Thunderbolts post-"Siege" ===
For his help in the downfall of Norman Osborn, Ghost was recruited into the new Thunderbolts team formed in the aftermath of the "Siege" storyline. In a battle with Ghost, Iron Man transmitted into Ghost's network a confirmation that all Stark Industries divisions were being shut down effective immediately. Ghost therefore resigned from plans to kill Stark, because he is no longer a tech monopolist. After coming back to the Raft, Ghost told Moonstone an unverifiable origin tale, whereupon he mused over whether that means he has regained his capacity to trust or whether he perceives her as no threat at all, only to conclude that both are irrelevant to a man who abandoned his humanity and is untouchable.

Ghost is hired by Tiberius Stone and Mark Raxton to sabotage Parker Industries, a competitor to Stone's company Alchemax. Ghost infiltrates Parker Industries, and while he is subdued by Spider-Man and the company's employees, he still succeeds in destroying the building.

== Powers and abilities ==
Ghost wears a battlesuit of his own design. Its Ghost-tech enables him to turn himself and any objects he touches invisible or intangible, but not both at the same time. Devices in the battle-suit enable him to hack and reprogram all manner of electronic systems in his vicinity as well as intercept, tamper with, or silence electromagnetic signals. This tech, along with his superb intellect, make him a super-hacker.

Ghost also invented guns that fire bursts of electricity or concussive force blasts and employs a large arsenal of high-tech weaponry, including incendiary devices, self-targeting Anson grenades and sound-activated bombs. He often avoids direct confrontations altogether, preferring subterfuge and ambush tactics.

He is a skilled tactician, inventor, and computer hacker.

== Reception ==
=== Accolades ===
- In 2018, Comic Book Resources (CBR) ranked Ghost 7th in their "Iron Man: His 20 Deadliest Villains" list.
- In 2022, Newsarama ranked Ghost 10th in their "Best Iron Man villains" list.

== Other versions ==
In the 2025 storyline One World Under Doom, an alternate version of Ghost named Ava Starr is recruited by Kristoff Vernard to be part of his Superior Avengers team. This version of Ghost is based on the character's Marvel Cinematic Universe counterpart of the same name.

== In other media ==
=== Television ===
- Ghost appears in the Iron Man episode "The Armor Wars" Pt. 1, voiced simultaneously by Jennifer Hale, Jamie Horton, and Tom Kane.
- Ghost appears in Iron Man: Armored Adventures, voiced by Michael Dobson. This version is a mercenary.
- Ghost appears in Avengers Assemble, voiced by Jim Cummings. This version is an Inhuman with innate phasing capabilities.
- Ghost appears in the Spider-Man episode "Stark Expo", voiced again by Jim Cummings. This version is a former Stark Industries employee.

=== Marvel Cinematic Universe ===
A female incarnation of Ghost, Ava Starr, appears in media set in the Marvel Cinematic Universe (MCU), portrayed by Hannah John-Kamen.

- First appearing in Ant-Man and the Wasp (2018), she is the daughter of Elihas Starr, a former colleague of Hank Pym who was killed during a failed attempt to build a portal to the Quantum Realm that also afflicted Ava with "molecular disequilibrium", which grants phasing powers while also causing her chronic pain. With Bill Foster's help, she was recruited into S.H.I.E.L.D. as an assassin and given a suit meant to control her instability in exchange for a cure before she and Foster went rogue upon learning the organization had no intention of helping her. After coming into conflict with Pym, Hope van Dyne, and Scott Lang while attempting to steal energy from the Quantum Realm via Janet van Dyne, risking the latter's life, Ava is later stabilized and goes into hiding with Foster once more while Lang, Pym and the Van Dynes gather energy from the Quantum Realm to stabilize Ava further.
- Ava returns in Thunderbolts* (2025). By this time, she came to work for Valentina Allegra de Fontaine before founding the eponymous Thunderbolts, which De Fontaine later rebrands as the New Avengers.
- A zombified variant of Ava appears in Marvel Zombies. As part of the Red Queen's army, she is killed by Blade Knight during the attack of the North Institute.
- Ava will appear in Avengers: Doomsday (2026).

=== Video games ===
- Ghost appears as a boss in the PSP and Wii versions of Iron Man 2, voiced by Steve Blum.
- Ghost appears in Marvel Heroes, voiced by Phil Buckman.
- Ghost appears in Marvel: Avengers Alliance 2.
- An unnamed female incarnation of Ghost appears in Iron Man VR, voiced by Chantelle Barry. This version is a computer hacker who wears a suit that allows her to fly and phase through solid matter. After being orphaned as a child due to Stark Industries' weapons, she seeks revenge against Tony Stark. In pursuit of her goals, she comes into contact with Stark's rogue A.I. Gunsmith, who manipulates her into pushing the company to produce weapons again in response to her attacks. After several battles, Ghost is defeated at her hideout and arrested. She later escapes and reluctantly joins forces with Stark to defeat Gunsmith before disappearing.
- The MCU incarnation of Ghost appears as a playable character in Lego Marvel Super Heroes 2 via the Marvel's Ant-Man and the Wasp DLC pack.

=== Miscellaneous ===
Ghost appears in the Spider-Woman motion comic, voiced by Jesse Falcon.
