= Jesse Falcon =

American comedian

Jesse Scot Falcon (born January 17, 1971, in Flint, Michigan) is an American improv and sketch comedy performer based in New York City. He attended Albion College in Albion, Michigan, graduating in 1993 with a degree in Speech, Communications, and Theatre. Since 1998, Falcon has been a performer at the Upright Citizens Brigade Theatre, working with comedians like Saturday Night Live's Amy Poehler and The Daily Show's Rob Corddry. Falcon also performs with other comedy groups such as Mother, The Chipperton Family, Telethon, and Girl Crush 2040. He has also appeared in the comedic short film Running with Scissors.

In 2005, Falcon was named a Contributing Editor to the national humor magazine Cracked.
