= Heroic Age (comics) =

Marvel Comics storyline (2010–2012)

"The Heroic Age"
- Promotional image for The Heroic Age. Art by Jim Cheung.
- Publisher: Marvel Comics
- Publication date: April 2010 – April 2012
- Genre: Superhero
- Main character: Avengers

Creative team
- Writer: Various
- Artist: Various

The Heroic Age is a 2010 comic book branding that ran through a number of books published by Marvel Comics. It began in April 2010 and ended in April 2012. It marked a major change in the status quo of the Marvel Universe after the events of the "Siege" crossover event, similarly to how "The Initiative" and "Dark Reign" dealt with the aftermath of "Civil War" and "Secret Invasion", respectively.

== Publication history ==
Marvel publisher Dan Buckley stated that the Heroic Age was intended to be more constrained in its scope than previous initiatives:

We're trying to get a little bit more into the families of publishing, not as line-wide, to provide people with very digestible beginning, middle, and end content with top characters and top creators in conjunction with the Marvel Universe... It's not going across the line in the books. You’ll see that with the X-Men books, you'll see it with Spider-Man.

The initiative began in May 2010's Avengers #1, which reunited Iron Man, Captain America (both Steve Rogers and Bucky Barnes), Thor, and Hawkeye as teammates. The same month saw the start of a four-issue comics anthology limited series called Age of Heroes, with Kurt Busiek writing the lead story. The idea behind the series is that, according to Tom Brevoort, "seeing as how Heroic Age will impact on characters both large and small, we thought it might be fun to do an anthology to delve into some of these stories and to touch upon some of these characters". Busiek's story involves J. Jonah Jameson, whereas Rick Remender's stars Doctor Voodoo, and Paul Cornell features Captain Britain and MI13 and the Young Masters.

The initiative also saw the debut of a new series, Atlas, featuring the Agents of Atlas, written by Jeff Parker. The Thunderbolts series, also written by Parker, featured a new Heroic Age line-up, led by Luke Cage (who is also in the lineup of the New Avengers), Crossbones, Juggernaut, Ghost, Moonstone, Songbird and Man-Thing. Another series launched was Secret Avengers by writer Ed Brubaker. The New Avengers series was relaunched in June 2010, written by Brian Michael Bendis and drawn by Stuart Immonen. A new series called Avengers Academy by Christos Gage and Mike McKone debuted in June 2010, as well as a new Young Allies series written by Sean McKeever and David Baldeon.

== Series ==
=== Cancelled series ===
- Dark Avengers
- New Avengers Vol. 1
- Mighty Avengers
- Avengers: The Initiative
- Incredible Hercules
- Agents of Atlas

=== New series ===
- The Avengers Vol. 4 #1–6
- New Avengers Vol. 2 #1–6
- Secret Avengers #1–5
- Avengers Academy #1–2
- Hawkeye & Mockingbird #1
- Atlas #1
- Black Widow Vol. 4 #2
- Young Allies #1
- Fantastic Four Vol. 1 #579-582
- Thunderbolts Vol. 1 #144-146
- Secret Warriors Vol. 1 #17-19
- Captain America Vol. 1 #606-610
- Uncanny X-Men Vol. 1 #526
- New Mutants Vol. 3 #15
- X-Men: Legacy #238
- Invincible Iron Man Vol. 2 #25-27
- Deadpool Vol. 4 #23
- Vengeance of the Moon Knight #8-10

=== Limited series ===
- Avengers Prime #1
- Avengers: The Children's Crusade #1–9
- Steve Rogers: Super-Soldier #1–4
- Astonishing Spider-Man & Wolverine #1-6
- Heroic Age: Prince of Power #1–4
- Astonishing X-Men Xenogenesis #1–5
- Age of Heroes #1–4
- Heroic Age: One Month to Live #1–5
- I Am an Avenger #1–5

=== One-shots ===
- Enter the Heroic Age #1
- Uncanny X-Men: The Heroic Age #1
- Death of Dracula #1
- Heroic Age Heroes #1
- Heroic Age X-Men #1
- Heroic Age Villains #1
- Avengers Spotlight Vol. 2 #1
- Heroic Age Previews #1
- FDNY Custom Comic #1
