= Paladin (comics) =

Marvel Comics character

- Paladin. Art by Leinil Francis Yu.

Publication information
- Publisher: Marvel Comics
- First appearance: Daredevil #150 (January 1978)
- Created by: Jim Shooter (writer); Carmine Infantino (artist)

In-story information
- Species: Human
- Team affiliations: Heroes for Hire; The Intruders; Thunderbolts; Defenders; Wild Pack
- Notable aliases: Paul Denning; Paul Dennis; Paladin
- Abilities: Slightly superhuman strength, speed, stamina, agility, reflexes, and durability; Skilled marksman, actor, espionage agent, bodyguard and detective; Highly skilled hand-to-hand combatant; Helmet with belt activated faceplate; Infrared vision via helmet's lenses; Wears bulletproof body suit; Use of stun gun

Paladin is a character appearing in American comic books published by Marvel Comics. Created by writer Jim Shooter and artist Carmine Infantino, the character first appeared in Daredevil #150 (January 1978). His real name is unknown, though he often uses the alias of Paul Denning. Although not a supervillain, his mercenary activities often bring him into conflict with superheroes, facing characters like Daredevil and the Punisher. He has notably worked for the Wild Pack, the Thunderbolts, and the Serpent Society.

The character made his live-action debut in the Marvel Cinematic Universe (MCU) miniseries VisionQuest (2026), portrayed by Todd Stashwick.

== Development ==
=== Concept and creation ===
The character was inspired by the 1950s Western television series Have Gun – Will Travel, whose main character, Paladin, an investigator/gunfighter, travels around the Old West working as a mercenary for people who hire him to solve their problems.

=== Publication history ===
Paladin debuted in Daredevil #150 (January 1978), with follow-up appearances in #152 (May 1978) and #154 (September 1978) as part of the same story arc. The character had a one-shot story published in Marvel Premiere #43 (August 1978), and was a billed guest star in the Spider-Man team-up title Marvel Team-Up #108 (August 1981). From there on, Paladin has mostly appeared as a guest star across the Marvel Universe, with occasional forays as a superteam member, in Silver Sable and the Wild Pack, Heroes for Hire, and Thunderbolts, and occasional feature appearances in the Marvel Comics Presents anthology.

== Fictional character biography ==
Paladin is a mercenary and private investigator, whose past is largely unrevealed. When first seen, he sought Daredevil while engaged in an assignment to track down the Purple Man, and battled Daredevil. He clashed with Daredevil a second time after the crime fighter inadvertently interfered with Paladin's search for the Purple Man. Paladin allied with Daredevil in battle against Cobra, Jester, and Mister Hyde, who were under control of the Purple Man.

An unabashed womanizer, Paladin often flirts with any woman who catches his eye. He briefly dated the Wasp at a time when she was separated from Hank Pym, much to Black Knight's jealousy, who was also attracted to her. Paladin also enlisted Generation X into helping him retrieve a sword for Adrienne Frost. During this period, Jubilee was attracted to Paladin, but that affection disappeared when Generation X and Paladin later went their separate ways. He has also been a longtime ally to Silver Sable and her Wild Pack organization, working for pay, of course. He once helped them protect a scientist from a kidnapping attempt by the Heroes for Hire, a group he would later join.

Paladin appears as a main character in the series Heroes for Hire. As it turns out, he was a traitor to the group, only using the Heroes as a means to hunt down Captain America for S.H.I.E.L.D. during the 2006 "Civil War" storyline. Paladin single-handedly defeats the Heroes for Hire team with a special gas weapon, but is overpowered and defeated by Shang-Chi.

In the 2008 storyline "Dark Reign", Paladin joins the Thunderbolts, Norman Osborn's personal black ops team. Hired to assassinate Elektra for 82 million dollars, Paladin broke into H.A.M.M.E.R. headquarters. However, Elektra overpowered him by choking him with one of her teeth that was loosened when Paladin punched her. Begging for his life, Paladin gave Elektra the key to escape her prison.

During the 2010 "Shadowland" storyline, Paladin is paired with Silver Sable, Misty Knight, and Shroud when Daredevil's Hand ninjas end up targeting members of the mafia. Following this, Knight reopens Heroes for Hire under the influence of Puppet Master; Paladin joins the team and soon realizes this and frees Knight from Puppet Master's control with help from Iron Fist. After the defeat of Puppet Master, Paladin convinces Knight to keep the operation open, but under their terms.

== Powers and abilities ==
Paladin is depicted as possessing superhuman strength, stamina, speed, and agility. He is also a highly skilled hand-to-hand combatant, with knowledge of boxing, judo, savate, and Taekwondo. Additionally, Paladin is a skilled marksman, actor, espionage agent, bodyguard and detective.

While he has been known to use lethal force, his preferred weapon is his stun gun, firing a beam which scrambles the signals within the target's nervous system sufficiently to render most people unconscious. The range and effectiveness are unknown. The gun is equipped so that only Paladin may operate it.

Paladin wears a bodysuit of synthetic stretch fabric, and his boots, gloves, helmet, torso, and knee and elbow guards are made of bulletproof composite materials. Paladin's helmet is equipped with a belt-activated faceplate which slides down to make the helmet airtight, and which provides a one-hour air supply. The lenses in Paladin's helmet can be adjusted for infrared vision.

== Reception ==
Matthew Aguilar of ComicBook.com stated Paladin became a fan favorite since his time with the Thunderbolts and Heroes for Hire.

== Other versions ==
=== Secret Wars (2015) ===
An alternate universe version of Paladin appears in "Secret Wars". This version is a police officer from the Battleworld domain of Killville.

=== Ultimate Marvel ===
The Ultimate Marvel version of Marc Spector used the Paladin name while working for the Roxxon Corporation.

== In other media ==
- Paladin appears in the Spider-Man episode "Take Two", voiced by Trevor Devall. This version is a member of the Wild Pack.
- Paladin appears in VisionQuest, portrayed by Todd Stashwick. This version's real name is Paul Denning, he was trained by a previous Paladin who killed his abusive father. He is also revealed to have a had a late wife named Chandra and an adult daughter named Tilly whom he has not seen since coming back from Thanos's snap.
- Paladin appears in Marvel: Avengers Alliance 2.
- Paladin appears in the motion comic Spider-Woman: Agent of S.W.O.R.D., voiced by David Murphy.
- In 2018, Hasbro released a Paladin action figure as part of the Marvel Legends action figure line.
