= Taskmaster (character) =

Marvel Comics fictional character

- Taskmaster on the cover of The Avengers #196 (June 1980); Art by George Pérez

Publication information
- Publisher: Marvel Comics
- First appearance: The Avengers #195 (May 1980)
- Created by: David Michelinie; George Pérez

In-story information
- Alter ego: Anthony "Tony" Masters
- Species: Human mutate
- Team affiliations: A.I.M.; Agency X; Assassins Guild; Cabal; Cape-Killers; Frightful Four; Initiative; Secret Avengers; Shadow Initiative; S.H.I.E.L.D.; Thunderbolts
- Notable aliases: Tasky; Contingency T
- Abilities: Master assassin and tactician; Master martial artist and hand-to-hand combatant; Expert swordsman, marksman and archer; Photographic reflexes

Taskmaster is a character appearing in American comic books published by Marvel Comics. Created by writer David Michelinie and artist George Pérez, he first appeared in The Avengers #195 (cover-dated May 1980) as an adversary of the Avengers before becoming a recurring figure across the broader Marvel Universe. His real name is Anthony Masters, and he operates primarily as a mercenary and trainer of criminal henchmen, selling his services to supervillain organizations and criminal enterprises.

The character's defining trait is an ability he calls photographic reflexes, which allows him to duplicate any physical movement he observes with immediate and precise accuracy. He has used this to build a fighting repertoire drawn from dozens of superheroes and martial artists, making him a credible opponent for figures including Captain America, Spider-Man, and Daredevil. The ability carries a permanent cost: each new technique absorbed displaces existing memories, steadily eroding his personal history. A later retcon established that his powers derived from a modified Nazi Super-Soldier Serum he injected himself with while working covertly for S.H.I.E.L.D., an arrangement he had no memory of.

Rather than operating as a conventional villain, Masters built his career around training others, establishing criminal academies across the United States that produced henchmen for hire. Among his more notable assignments were training John Walker as a replacement Captain America at the direction of the Red Skull, and later serving as drill instructor for the Fifty-State Initiative at Camp Hammond. He subsequently operated as a double agent inside A.I.M.'s High Council on behalf of S.H.I.E.L.D.'s Secret Avengers, and appeared as a member of the Thunderbolts during the "Devil's Reign" crossover event.

The character has been adapted across animated television series, video games, and film. A female version named Antonia Dreykov appeared in the Marvel Cinematic Universe, portrayed by Olga Kurylenko in Black Widow (2021) and Thunderbolts* (2025).

== Publication history ==
The Taskmaster first appeared briefly in The Avengers #195 (May 1980), created by writer David Michelinie and artist George Pérez. making his full debut in Avengers #196 (June 1980).

The Taskmaster appeared in his own limited series Taskmaster #1–4 (2002), which was followed by a supporting role in Agent X #1–15 (2002–2003). The character went on to feature prominently in Avengers: The Initiative as a supporting character in #8–19 (2008–2009) and Avengers: The Initiative Annual #1 (2008) then later as a central character in #20–35 (2009–2010) during the Dark Reign and Siege storylines. A second limited series followed in 2010–2011, written by Fred Van Lente with art by Jefte Palo, which introduced significant retcons to the character's history, including the revelation of his ties to S.H.I.E.L.D. and the existence of his wife, Mercedes Merced. In 2011, Taskmaster received a solo graphic novel collecting a four-issue story—Taskmaster: Unthinkable.

In Marvel's 2012–2015 rebranding, Marvel NOW!, Taskmaster joins a new incarnation of the Secret Avengers.

A five-issue limited series written by Jed MacKay with art by Alessandro Vitti and a cover by Valerio Giangiordano was originally solicited for April 2020, timed to coincide with the release of the Black Widow film, before being rescheduled to November of that year. The series centered on Taskmaster as the prime suspect in the apparent murder of Maria Hill, drawing the wider espionage community of the Marvel Universe into pursuit of him.

Taskmaster appeared as a member of the Thunderbolts in "Devil's Reign", a six-issue crossover event written by Chip Zdarsky with art by Marco Checchetto that launched in December 2021. The team, which also included Crossbones, Typhoid Mary, Shocker, Whiplash, Rhino, and Kraven, was assembled by Mayor Wilson Fisk as part of his campaign to eliminate superheroes from New York.

== Characterization ==
=== Fictional character biography ===
Anthony "Tony" Masters grew up in the Bronx, New York, and discovered in childhood that he could replicate any physical movement he observed. After watching a cowboy program on television, he found he could perform the actor's rope tricks without practice. A subsequent attempt to copy a backwards dive he had seen performed off a diving board nearly ended in drowning; the ability transferred the motion but not the underlying knowledge, and he did not know how to swim. His mother arranged for psychiatrists to examine him, and they described the ability as "photographic reflexes." He made use of it throughout adolescence, including becoming his high school football team's quarterback after watching a single professional game. After graduating, he considered pursuing a career as a superhero but concluded that crime would be more profitable.

Masters studied television footage of superheroes to build out his fighting techniques, committed several grand larcenies, then decided that direct confrontation with law enforcement was impractical. Using his stolen capital, he established a network of criminal academies training henchmen for supervillains and criminal organizations. One early, unidentified graduate later became the espionage operative Spymaster. Other students included Brock Rumlow, Rachel Leighton, and Sheoke Sanada, who went on to operate as Crossbones, Diamondback, and Snapdragon respectively.

Masters set up the Solomon Institute for the Criminally Insane as a front for one of his facilities. When the institute's administrator, Dr. Parnell Solomon, developed heart trouble and directed Masters's staff to grow him a clone for organ harvesting, the clone escaped and alerted the Avengers. Scott Lang, then serving as Ant-Man, helped expose the operation. In the confrontation that followed, Masters held his own against both Captain America and Iron Man in combat, though the unfamiliar fighting style of the robotic Avengers associate Jocasta threw him off and he fled.

The Red Skull, operating under the alias John Smith, later manipulated Commission on Superhuman Activities director Douglas Rockwell into reducing Masters's prison sentence in exchange for training John Walker as a replacement Captain America using Steve Rogers's fighting style. After Masters completed this assignment, the Skull arranged his escape and funded further operations, directing him to train additional students in Rogers's techniques so that the Skull could use them as targets in his own exercises.

During the conflict that arose from the Superhuman Registration Act, Masters joined the government-sanctioned Thunderbolts and fought against Captain America's resistance forces. Following Captain America's surrender he was rearrested and transferred toward the Negative Zone prison, before Deadpool intervened and freed him. S.H.I.E.L.D. Commander Maria Hill subsequently offered Masters a full presidential pardon in return for testing the defenses of a S.H.I.E.L.D. Helicarrier, which he successfully breached. The Commission on Superhuman Activities then assigned him to Camp Hammond as the Fifty-State Initiative's drill instructor, where his students included Eric O'Grady, Cloud Nine, Komodo, Stature, and Triathlon, among others. He also trained three clones of the slain Initiative cadet Michael Van Patrick in Spider-Man's fighting techniques, with the clones subsequently deployed as the Scarlet Spiders.

After the Skrull invasion, Norman Osborn assumed control of the Initiative and restructured it. Masters was reassigned to the Shadow Initiative alongside Bengal, Constrictor, Komodo, and Typhoid Mary. He and the criminal operative Parker Robbins were placed in joint command, responsible for training new recruits to perform publicly as heroes.

A bounty was subsequently placed on Masters's head by a criminal organization called the Org, following a rumor that he had been acting as an informant for Captain America. Pursuing leads to clear his name, he recovered memories he had no recollection of losing. Years earlier, while working covertly for S.H.I.E.L.D., he had injected himself with a modified Super-Soldier Serum derived from a Nazi formula; a compound that dramatically increased his capacity to absorb and retain knowledge while destroying his declarative memory. Among the recovered memories was the existence of his wife, Mercedes Merced, a S.H.I.E.L.D. agent who had served as his handler, and the revelation that the two of them jointly operated the Org as a S.H.I.E.L.D. front. S.H.I.E.L.D.'s own assessment put his mission success rate at twenty percent.

The memory loss had other consequences. A student at the Avengers Academy, Finesse, tracked Masters down after concluding that he was her biological father; she possessed the same photographic reflexes he did. When the two met, they fought. Masters recognized that she had no fighting style of her own, only a collection of moves copied from others, a mirror of himself. He understood that within days he would have no memory of the encounter, or of her.

=== Powers and abilities ===
Masters's central ability, which he calls photographic reflexes, allows him to replicate any physical movement he observes without practice, regardless of its complexity. The duplication is immediate and precise, though it does not transfer underlying knowledge; watching someone swim does not make him a swimmer. He cannot replicate feats that depend on superhuman strength or other superhuman attributes. By periodically reviewing recordings of a movement, he can retain it indefinitely. Against opponents whose techniques he has already studied, he can effectively anticipate their attacks in advance, and he can identify individuals he has studied by their body language alone, making physical disguises unreliable against him. The ability extends to vocal mimicry and language acquisition.

After injecting himself with a modified imitation of a Nazi Super-Soldier Serum, Masters's capacity to absorb and retain knowledge increased substantially. The compound also destroyed his declarative memory, progressively erasing personal history and experience as his combat repertoire grew. He temporarily gained the ability to double his speed and reflexes to the point of intercepting bullets in flight, and briefly duplicated the superhuman powers of several Avengers through technology developed by the biologist Augusta Seger; both enhancements have since faded.

A naturally gifted athlete, Masters has trained himself into superb physical condition. His fighting repertoire spans multiple historical and contemporary martial arts, boxing, wrestling, swordsmanship, archery, marksmanship, gymnastics, aerial acrobatics, juggling, and sleight of hand. He has also trained in meditation techniques that allow him to slow his breathing and conserve air for extended periods. Among the individuals whose techniques he has studied and incorporated are Captain America, Daredevil, Spider-Man, Hawkeye, Bullseye, Deadpool, Elektra, Iron Fist, Wolverine, Thor, Iron Man, the Punisher, and Moon Knight, along with numerous others. The same ability translates to non-combat contexts; Masters can use it to cheat at gambling, perform at a professional level in sport, and replicate cooking techniques.

His weapons are customized by hired scientists and modeled on those used by the fighters he mimics, though generally not to the same standard as the originals. His most frequently carried items include a concave metal alloy shield twelve pounds in weight and two and a half feet in diameter, which he uses in Captain America's style; a billy club used in Daredevil's style; a pair of .45 Colt automatic handguns modeled on the Punisher's; wrist-mounted web shooters based on Spider-Man's; a bow and trick arrows based on Hawkeye's equipment; Pym Particles used in Ant-Man's fashion; and European and Japanese swords modeled on those of the Black Knight and the Silver Samurai. He also carries throwing darts, knives, sais, a lariat, grenade launchers, sniper rifles, crossbows, and various explosives. His costume incorporates lightweight bulletproof Kevlar and a utility belt. A concealed image inducer allows him to project a hologram of himself in civilian clothing, alter his apparent facial features, impersonate others, and deploy a decoy hologram in combat.

== Other versions ==
=== Age of Ultron ===
An alternate universe version of Taskmaster from Earth-61112 appears in Age of Ultron. He works with Black Panther and Red Hulk to battle Ultron's drones, only for Red Hulk to kill Taskmaster after he attempts to take one of the drones for his own use.

=== Avataars: Covenant of the Shield ===
Deathmaster, a fantasy-themed incarnation of Taskmaster from the artificial planet Eurth, appears in Avataars: Covenant of the Shield.

=== Deadpool Max ===
A female version of Taskmaster from an unidentified universe appears in the Marvel Max series Deadpool Max. This version became a mother figure and mentor to a young version of Deadpool after kidnapping his Muskrat troop. She is later revealed to be a potential cult leader and child molester.

=== House of M ===
An alternate universe version of Taskmaster from Earth-58163 appears in House of M. This version is a member of the Brotherhood strike force.

=== JLA/Avengers ===
Taskmaster appears in JLA/Avengers #4 as a brainwashed minion of Krona.

=== Marvel Apes ===
An alternate universe version of Taskmaster from Earth-38831 appears in Marvel Apes.

=== Marvel Universe Millennial Visions 2001 ===
An alternate universe version of Taskmaster from Earth-22000 appears in the one-shot Marvel Universe: Millennial Visions. This version was hypnotized by the Ringmaster and forced to reform and become a member of the Thunderbolts.

=== Marvel Universe vs. the Punisher ===
An alternate universe version of Taskmaster from Earth-11080 appears in Marvel Universe vs. the Punisher #4, where he is killed by a cannibalistic Red Hulk.

=== Ultimate Marvel ===
An alternate universe version of Taskmaster from Earth-1610 appears in Ultimate Comics: Spider-Man. This version is African-American and possesses the ability to absorb and redirect energy.

=== What If ===
An alternate universe version of Taskmaster from Earth-8909 appears in What If? #3. This version trained Super-Patriot to replace Captain America.

== In other media ==
=== Television ===
- Taskmaster appears in Ultimate Spider-Man, voiced by Clancy Brown. This version is a founding member of the Thunderbolts.
- Taskmaster appears in Avengers Assemble, voiced again by Clancy Brown.

=== Film ===
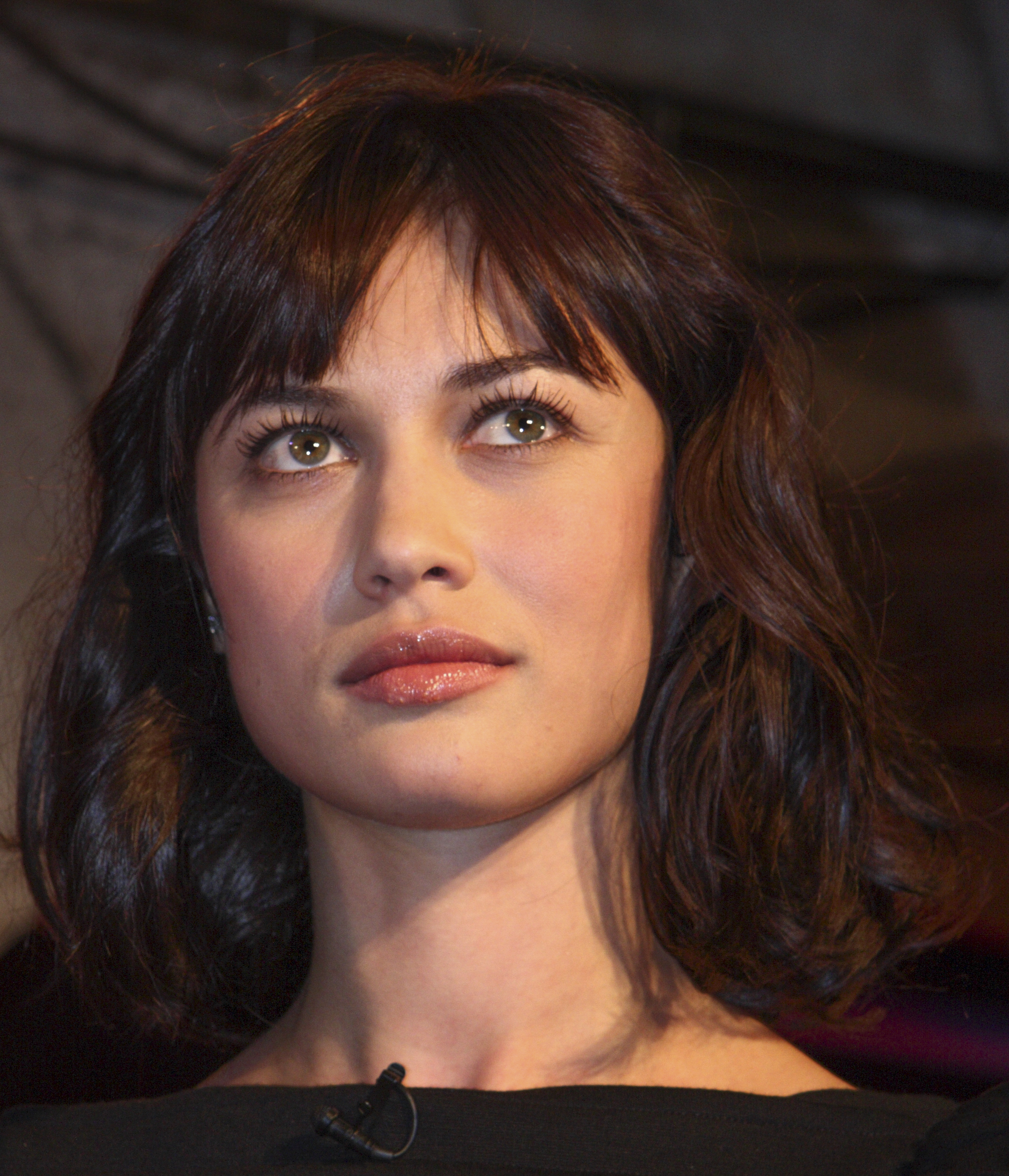
Olga Kurylenko plays Taskmaster in the MCU.

- Taskmaster makes a cameo appearance in Avengers Confidential: Black Widow & Punisher as a member of Leviathan.
- Taskmaster appears in Iron Man and Captain America: Heroes United, voiced again by Clancy Brown.
- A female incarnation of Taskmaster named Antonia Dreykov appears in the Marvel Cinematic Universe, portrayed by Olga Kurylenko.
  - In Black Widow (2021), Taskmaster completes missions for the Red Room before Natasha Romanoff undoes her brainwashing.
  - In Thunderbolts* (2025), Taskmaster came to work for Valentina Allegra de Fontaine as an assassin before being killed by Ava Starr / Ghost.

=== Video games ===
- Taskmaster appears as a playable character in Marvel vs. Capcom 3: Fate of Two Worlds and Ultimate Marvel vs. Capcom 3, voiced by Steve Blum.
- Taskmaster appears in Marvel Super Hero Squad Online.
- Taskmaster appears as a playable character in Marvel Heroes, voiced again by Steve Blum.
- Taskmaster appears as the final boss of Captain America's storyline in Avengers Initiative, voiced again by Steve Blum.
- Taskmaster appears as a boss and unlockable playable character in Marvel: Avengers Alliance.
- Taskmaster appears as an unlockable playable character in Lego Marvel Super Heroes, voiced again by Steve Blum.
- Taskmaster appears as an unlockable playable character in Marvel: Avengers Alliance Tactics.
- Taskmaster appears as a boss in Captain America: The Winter Soldier - The Official Game, voiced by Roger Craig Smith.
- Taskmaster appears as an unlockable playable character in Marvel Avengers Academy, voiced by Adam Montoya.
- Taskmaster appears as an unlockable playable character in Lego Marvel's Avengers.
- Taskmaster appears as a boss in Spider-Man, voiced by Brian Bloom.
- Taskmaster appears as a boss in Marvel's Avengers, voiced by Walter Gray. This version is a former S.H.I.E.L.D. agent who runs a private mercenary group and has history with Black Widow. Additionally, clones of Taskmaster created by A.I.M. appear in side missions.
- Taskmaster appears as a playable character in Marvel: Future Fight as part of the Secret Empire update.
- Taskmaster appears as a purchasable outfit in Fortnite Battle Royale.
- Taskmaster appears in Marvel Cosmic Invasion, voiced by Kerry Shale.

=== Merchandise ===
- Taskmaster received a figurine in The Classic Marvel Figurine Collection.
- Taskmaster received a figurine in Funko's "Marvel Pop!" line.
- Taskmaster received a figure in Toy Biz's Marvel Legends line.
- Taskmaster received a figure in the Marvel Minimates line.
- Taskmaster received a figure in the Marvel Super Hero Squad line as part of a two-pack with Deadpool.
- Taskmaster received a figure in the Marvel Universe line's "Marvel's Greatest Battles" sub-line as part of a two-pack with Deadpool.
- Taskmaster received a figure in the Lego Marvel Super Heroes "Hulk Lab Smash" set.
- Taskmaster, based on his second design in Ultimate Spider-Man, received a figure in Hasbro's Marvel Legends line via the "Mercenaries of Mayhem" sub-line.
- Taskmaster received a figure in the Marvel Legends Avengers: Infinity War Thanos Build-A-Figure line.
- The MCU incarnation of Taskmaster received a figure in Marvel Legends Black Widow line.
- Taskmaster received a figure in the Marvel Legends "Cabal" three-pack of figures alongside Iron Patriot and Doctor Doom.

=== Miscellaneous ===
- The Marvel vs. Capcom 3 incarnation of Taskmaster appears in the game's one-shot tie-in comic.
- Taskmaster appears in the Marvel Rising motion comic, voiced again by Brian Bloom.
- Taskmaster appears in the HeroClix Collectible Miniatures game.
- Taskmaster appears in the Marvel Crisis Protocol miniatures game.
