= Jester (Jonathan Powers) =

Jonathan Powers Jester

Publication information
- Publisher: Marvel Comics
- First appearance: Daredevil #42 (July 1968)
- Created by: Stan Lee (writer); Gene Colan (artist)

In-story information
- Alter ego: Jonathan Powers
- Species: Human
- Team affiliations: Screwball
- Abilities: Well-trained acrobat, hand to hand combatant, and fencer; Use of armed miniature robots and a one-man submarine; Possesses an arsenal of joke-themed weapons; Minimally talented actor; Trained gymnast

Jester (Jonathan Powers) is a character appearing in American comic books published by Marvel Comics. Created by writer Stan Lee and artist Gene Colan, the character first appeared in Daredevil #42 (July 1968). Powers is the first of several costumed criminals to use this identity. He is a recurring antagonist of the superhero Matt Murdock / Daredevil.

== Publication history ==
Jonathan Powers debuted in Daredevil #42 (July 1968), created by Stan Lee and Gene Colan. He appeared in the 2013 The Superior Spider-Man series, and is mentioned in the 2016 Civil War II series.

== Fictional character biography ==
Jonathan Powers was born in Hoboken, New Jersey. He was a struggling actor with a huge ego who got his big break as the leading character in an off-Broadway revival of Cyrano de Bergerac. Panned by critics, jeered by the audience, and disdained by his fellow performers, Powers was fired after one performance. Obsessively, he continued to study arts and crafts that he thought would earn him roles, things like gymnastics and body building. He turned down suggestions that he should take actual acting classes, insisting that he already had more raw acting talent than anyone who had ever lived. Still, Powers was only able to find employment as a stooge in a children's television show taped in New York.

Finally getting fed up with having pies thrown in his face, Powers vents his anger with society by turning his extensive training in gymnastics and fencing to a life of crime. Contracting the criminal weapons-maker the Tinkerer to make him a number of gimmicks, Powers fashions himself a harlequin-like disguise and calls himself the Jester. After gaining some notoriety as a professional thief, the Jester is hired by Richard Raleigh to get Foggy Nelson to resign his campaign for district attorney. This brings the Jester into conflict with Daredevil, who continues trying to apprehend him, even after they find Raleigh dead. Angered by Daredevil's persistence, he vows revenge.

In his civilian guise as Jonathan Powers, he stages his own murder at the hands of Daredevil. However, Daredevil clears his name by defeating and then unmasking the Jester on live television, demonstrating that his "victim" was still alive. He later escapes prison and teams up with two fellow enemies of Daredevil, the Cobra and Mister Hyde, for revenge. They lure Daredevil to an amusement park, but he defeats and apprehends them there.

After escaping prison, the Jester kidnaps an actor portraying Cyrano de Bergerac on live television and takes his place. His performance is a success with the audience. When he afterwards learns that Daredevil was diverting the police's attention so that he could finish his performance, he voluntarily surrenders. Later, Powers allows himself to be the host of a demon, gaining great strength in the process. When the demon leaves him, Powers is apparently left comatose.

The Jester later collaborates with Screwball, with the two starting a web show called "Jested". Their first episode had them doing a prank on Mayor J. Jonah Jameson. After that happened, both of them are tracked down by the Superior Spider-Man, who brutally defeats them.

During the Civil War II storyline, Powers apparently retires from his former role until he is arrested as part of an entrapment operation set up by undercover police officers and an informant, despite the fact that all he was doing was talking about his old days rather than actually planning a crime. Despite the She-Hulk making a passionate argument about the need to believe in redemption and not condemn someone for their thoughts, Powers is sentenced to prison, where he is shot by a prison guard during a riot a couple of days later. During the Spider-Men II miniseries, the Jester is revealed to have survived.

== Powers and abilities ==
Jonathan Powers is a talented acrobat, gymnast, and fencer. He utilizes a range of joke-themed weapons, some of which are created by the Tinkerer, to assist in his criminal activities. Jester's gadgets are all humor-themed, aligning with his identity, and include a weighted yo-yo, exploding popcorn, and gas-emitting discs.

== Reception ==
Maxwell Pishny of Comic Book Resources describes Jonathan Powers as a less extreme and deadly adversary to Daredevil compared to other villains in the series. He notes that Powers' gimmicks and humor helped keep his stories lighthearted and enjoyable for readers.

== In other media ==
Jester appears in the Moon Girl and Devil Dinosaur episode "Make It, Don't Break It", voiced by Kalen Aris Whitfield.
