= Siege (comics) =

Marvel comic book storyline dealing with the culmination of the "Dark Reign" storyline

- Cover of Siege 1 (Mar 2010); Featuring Thor, Iron Man, Captain America, Loki, and Norman Osborn, art by Olivier Coipel
- Publisher: Marvel Comics
- Publication date: December 2009 – May 2010
- Genre: Superhero; Crossover
Title(s)
Avengers: The Initiative #31-35
Dark Avengers #13-16
Dark Wolverine #82-84
Mighty Avengers #35-36
New Avengers #61-64 Annual #3
New Mutants #11
Origins of Siege #1
Siege #1-4
Siege: The Cabal #1
Siege: Embedded #1-4
Siege: Storming Asgard - Heroes and Villains #1
Sentry: Fallen Sun
Thor #607-610
Thunderbolts #141-143
Siege: Captain America #1
Siege: Loki #1
Siege: Secret Warriors #1
Siege: Spider-Man #1
Siege: Young Avengers #1
- Main character(s): Avengers; New Avengers; Dark Avengers; Young Avengers; Asgardians; Norman Osborn; Loki

Creative team
- Writer: Brian Michael Bendis
- Artist: Olivier Coipel
- Siege Prelude: ISBN 0-7851-4310-6
- Siege: ISBN 0-7851-4810-8

Siege is an American comic book, published by Marvel Comics from January to May 2010. It deals with the climax of the "Dark Reign" storyline, which saw the character Norman Osborn become the United States primary defense officer, leading H.A.M.M.E.R. as well as employing his own evil Avengers. The story depicts Loki manipulating Osborn into leading an all-out assault on Asgard, at the time located within the United States.

== Publication history ==
The "Siege" storyline consists of a four-issue mini-series and a number of related tie-in books, including one-shots, miniseries, and existing ongoing series.

Marvel announced in early 2010 that the company's "Siege" storyline would be followed by the "Heroic Age" storyline. This was first hinted at in the story by Athena to Amadeus Cho.

=== Publication aftermath ===
The end of the story was described as what would be the start of a new "Heroic Age" in the Marvel Universe.

The final tie-in issues of the four Avengers titles, The Mighty Avengers #36, New Avengers #64, Dark Avengers #16 and Avengers: The Initiative #35 were the last ones of those series, along with a New Avengers: Finale one-shot, with illustrations by Bryan Hitch.

In June 2010 Marvel published Avengers Prime: Siege Aftermath. This five-part series focused on Thor, Iron Man, and Captain America and bridged the gap between "Siege" and "Heroic Age".

Though not badged as an aftermath series, a limited series starting in May 2010 examined the fall of Norman Osborn and effects upon his son Harry Osborn. The series was titled Amazing Spider-Man Presents: American Son.

== Plot ==
The storyline opens with Norman Osborn calling a meeting of the Cabal, consisting of Doctor Doom, the Hood, Taskmaster, and Loki, to discuss Asgard (the home of the Norse gods), which is now hovering above Broxton, Oklahoma, and the last holdout in Osborn's consolidation of power.

A rift develops between Doom and Osborn, creating mayhem that appears to break up the group. Later, under his pretense of respectability, Osborn attempts in vain to secure permission from the President of the United States to invade Asgard, claiming it poses a national security threat. On Loki's advice, Osborn manipulates Volstagg into battling the U-Foes, causing an explosion that kills everyone in the Soldier Field football stadium. This gives Osborn the justification to lay siege on Asgard with military troops and the Dark Avengers — his team of supervillains posing as superheroes and with loyalists planted amid the various 50-State Initiative teams of heroes.

Osborn's aide-de-camp, Victoria Hand, suggests unsuccessfully that Osborn seek therapy for his instability. Shortly thereafter, the President realizes that Osborn is unstable and orders Hand to produce him. Captain America and his own Avengers lead a rebellion against Osborn. The events in Siege led to Marvel Comics introducing the subsequent storyline "Heroic Age".

== What If? ==
The non-canon series "What If..." features an alternate universe version of the story, "What if Osborn won the Siege of Asgard", in issue #200. Ares gives in to his intuition before the Siege of Asgard, attacking Osborn in his own office after realizing Osborn lied to him. Sentry murders Ares on the spot allowing him to rest up between battles and head into battle fully powered. In turn, this leads to him being able to kill Thor as well as Captain America. Most of the heroes present are subsequently slaughtered by the Dark Avengers. Doom devises a fresh plan of attack after teleporting Emma Frost and himself away from the conflict. Emma will scan the Dark Avengers as part of the new plan to learn the truth about the death of Lindy, the Sentry's wife.

== Reception ==
- The first issue received a rating of 5.9 out of 10 from Comic Book Roundup and a rating of 7.9 out of 10 from IGN.
- The second issue received a 6.6 out of 10 from Comic Book Roundup and a rating of 7.4 out of 10 from IGN.
- The third issue received a 7.5 rating out of 10 from Comic Book Roundup and a rating of 7.2 out of 10 from IGN.
- The fourth issue received a 6.2 rating out of 10 from Comic Book Roundup and a rating of 6.9 out of 10 from IGN.

== Collected editions ==
Comics in the storyline were collected into individual trade paperback volumes:

- Siege Prelude (collects Dark Avengers #1, Dark Reign: The Cabal, Thor #600, Dark Reign: The List - Avengers, New Avengers Annual #3, Dark Reign: The Goblin Legacy, and Marvel Spotlight #30, 264 pages, Marvel Comics, softcover, January 2010, ISBN 0-7851-4310-6)
- Siege (148 pages, Panini, May 2010, ISBN 1-84653-452-6)
- Siege (collects Siege #1-4, Siege: The Cabal, and Siege Digital Prologue, 144 pages, hardcover, August 2010, ISBN 0-7851-4810-8)
- Siege (collects Siege: The Cabal, Siege #1-4, and Avengers: The Way Things are, Marvel Comics, softcover, 2010, ISBN 978-0-7851-4079-5)
- Siege: X-Men - Dark Wolverine & New Mutants (collects Dark Wolverine #82-84, New Mutants #11, and Siege: Storming Asgard - Heroes & Villains, 128 pages, Marvel Comics, premiere hardcover, August 2010, ISBN 0-7851-4815-9)
- Siege: Embedded (collects Siege: Embedded #1-4, 112 pages, premiere hardcover, August 2010, ISBN 0-7851-4764-0)
- Siege: Battlefield (collects Siege: Spider-Man, Siege: Young Avengers, Siege: Loki, Siege: Captain America, and Siege: Secret Warriors, 120 pages, premiere hardcover, August 2010, ISBN 0-7851-4598-2)
- Siege: New Avengers (collects New Avengers #61-64, New Avengers Annual #3, The List - New Avengers, and New Avengers Finale, 192 pages, premiere hardcover, September 2010, ISBN 0-7851-4577-X)
- Siege: Avengers - The Initiative (collects Avengers: The Initiative #31-35, 120 pages, Marvel Comics, premiere hardcover, September 2010, ISBN 0-7851-4817-5)
- Siege: Thunderbolts (collects Thunderbolts #138-143, 144 pages, premiere hardcover, September 2010, ISBN 0-7851-4373-4)
- Siege: Thor (collects Thor #607-610, New Mutants (2009) #11 and Siege: Loki, 144 pages, September 2010, ISBN 0-7851-4813-2)
- Siege: Mighty Avengers (collects Mighty Avengers #32-36, 120 pages, premiere hardcover, October 2010, ISBN 0-7851-4800-0)
- Dark Avengers: Siege (collects Dark Avengers #13-16, and Dark Avengers Annual, 144 pages, Marvel Comics, premiere hardcover, October 2010, ISBN 0-7851-4811-6)
