= Thunderbolts (comic book) =

American comic book series

- The cover of Thunderbolts #35. Art by Mark Bagley.

Publication information
- Publisher: Marvel Comics
- Format: Ongoing series
- Genre: Superhero
- Main character: Thunderbolts

Thunderbolts is the name of several comic book titles featuring the team the Thunderbolts and published by Marvel Comics, beginning with the original Thunderbolts comic book series which debuted in 1997.

== Publication history ==
The Thunderbolts first appeared in The Incredible Hulk (vol. 2) #449 (January 1997) and were created by Kurt Busiek and Mark Bagley.

The Thunderbolts were first presented, both to readers and to the Marvel Universe, as a group of super-powered figures who became heroes to help protect the world when the Avengers were declared dead after the events of the 1996 "Onslaught" crossover. The final page of the first issue of their comic book, however, revealed that the Thunderbolts were actually the Masters of Evil in disguise, a surprise twist carefully guarded by Marvel.

Themes of redemption and the nature of heroism are often featured in Thunderbolts comics. The book has also garnered critical praise for its use of secondary characters from other Marvel Comics and its use of continuity-themed storytelling.

The Thunderbolts was an original concept created for Marvel by Busiek and Bagley. Most of the characters used in the final concept were reimagined versions of existing Marvel characters, with additional original characters for the series developed by Busiek and designed by Bagley. The pair also created the new heroic identities for the Masters of Evil. Busiek recalled:

The actual origin of Thunderbolts came when I used to live in New Jersey and drive to New England to visit my parents. To keep myself awake, I'd give myself books to write, and work out about two to three years of continuity. One trip, I assigned myself Avengers, and came up with the plan that the Masters of Evil would ultimately conquer them by posing as new heroes and slowly replacing them. At the time, I thought it was a neat idea, and filed it away.

While Busiek's original reluctance was because he deemed readers would not have liked replacing the established characters and then having the new ones being villains – "doing that with one character, like what Marv Wolfman did with Terra, made a great sting, but doing it on a team-wide scale wouldn't work" – seeing a world devoid of many heroes following "Onslaught" made him revive the concept. The Thunderbolts first appeared as a team in The Incredible Hulk (vol. 2) #449 (January 1997), written by Peter David and illustrated by Mike Deodato. Originally intended to be a similar team known as the "Echelon", the synchronization of the plans led to the Thunderbolts being used instead as a "teaser" for their own series. No mention was made of the connection between the Thunderbolts and the Masters of Evil in this appearance, save perhaps for the Hulk almost recognizing Meteorite's voice (having fought Moonstone before). The team also appeared in a one-shot called Tales of the Marvel Universe. The twist was not revealed until the first issue of their own series.

Soon after the publication of The Incredible Hulk (vol. 2) #449, the team's own series premiered. The first issue, cover dated April 1997, was played largely as a straight superhero story, until the revelation of the Thunderbolts' true nature on the last page of the comic. This is considered one of the most well-conceived plot twists in the history of American comic books, with Wizard magazine readers voting it "Comics' Greatest Moment of 1997" and later, in 1998, placing it at #11 on a list of "The 25 Greatest Comic Moments Ever". Marvel managed to keep the secret of the Thunderbolts' true villainous identities tightly under wraps before the book launched. When word got out, the first issue sold out so quickly that Marvel not only offered a second printing, but also did a "mini-trade paperback" collecting the first two issues. Fabian Nicieza replaced Busiek in issue #34. Patrick Zircher, after a couple of fill-ins, replaced Bagley in issue #51.

Despite critical acclaim, the book was reformatted with Thunderbolts #76 (March 2003), removing the entire cast and creative team and replacing it with a brand new set of characters, along with a new writer, John Arcudi. The move was done in part due to Marvel Editor-in-Chief Joe Quesada's desire to emulate the success he had with X-Force, which was reformatted with a new cast of characters and status quo that was successful in sales and popularity. However, the new direction for the series—an underground fighting circuit that employed predominantly newly created super-villain characters—was a commercial failure and canceled after six issues.

In 2004, Marvel Comics launched a limited series titled Avengers/Thunderbolts, which continued one year after the events of issue #75. The limited series ran for the same number of issues as the reformatted Thunderbolts arc.

Soon after the completion of Avengers/Thunderbolts, Marvel Comics launched a second series featuring the characters with New Thunderbolts #1 (January 2005). The storyline continued the events from Avengers/Thunderbolts as well as the fall-out of "Avengers Disassembled" and returned to the original series concept, though with a roster that lacked many fan favorites (such as Baron Zemo, Moonstone, and Techno). With the combination of the eighty-one issues of the first series and the first eighteen issues of New Thunderbolts, the series reverted to its original numbering with Thunderbolts #100.

Thunderbolts #110 saw another change to the direction of the series, with writer Warren Ellis introducing a new team of Thunderbolts, villains working for the government, tasked with capturing unregistered superheroes. Ellis has stated that he chose to approach the series "gently, but directly from a political agenda" and the relaunch was closely tied to Marvel's commercially successful Civil War event, with the team serving as a dark reflection of the event's controversial ending.

Ellis stepped aside in issue #121 and was replaced by Christos Gage, who wrote three one-shots and a four-issue tie-in with Secret Invasion. At the 2008 San Diego Comic-Con, Andy Diggle was announced as the new ongoing writer, starting in issue #126 (November 2008) with a two issue story "Burning Down the House" which cleared the way for the introduction of a new team line-up. This team debuted in Thunderbolts #128-129, a story that dealt with "Dark Reign", the Secret Invasion aftermath, which was followed by "Magnum Opus", a 4-issue crossover with Deadpool (vol. 2). Miguel Sepulvida took over art duties with Thunderbolts #133 and Jeff Parker became the new writer with issue #138. Parker then piloted the title through the end of "Dark Reign", featuring a crossover with the Agents of Atlas team he was also writing, and into "Siege", following which the team was revamped again. Parker announced that "the status quo of the team undergoes a major overhaul for the new era to come. It's going to synthesize a lot of what readers like about recent history and re-instill some elements from the early days of the book."

The Heroic Age team debuted in Thunderbolts #144 with a new main artist, Kev Walker. The title crossed over with Avengers Academy in issue #147, which was bookended by Avengers Academy #3 and #4. The series then went on to cross over with the Daredevil storyline "Shadowland" in issues #148-149, with artist Declan Shalvey stepping in for the two issues. The series then crossed over with the "Fear Itself" storyline in issues #158-163.

The Thunderbolts comic book was renamed Dark Avengers beginning with issue #175, but the creative team remained unchanged. Dark Avengers ended with issue #190.

As part of Marvel NOW!, a new Thunderbolts series was launched featuring a new team. This series ended in October 2014 with issue #32.

In July 2023, a new Thunderbolts series was announced for a December release and will be written by Collin Kelly and Jackson Lanzing and illustrated by Geraldo Borges.

== Collected editions ==
The Thunderbolts' stories have been collected in a number of Marvel Omnibus oversized hardcovers and trade paperbacks:

Marvel Omnibus

- Thunderbolts Omnibus:
  - Volume 1 (collects Thunderbolts (1997) #0, 1-33, Thunderbolts Annual 1997, Thunderbolts: Distant Rumblings (1997) #-1, Incredible Hulk (1968) #449, Spider-Man Team-Up (1995) #7, Heroes For Hire (1997) #7, Captain America & Citizen V Annual 1998, Avengers (1998) #12, and the Thunderbolts story from Tales of the Marvel Universe (1997) #1)
  - Volume 2 (collects Thunderbolts (1997) #34-63, Thunderbolts Annual 2000, Avengers (1998) #31-34, Avengers Annual 2000, Thunderbolts: Life Sentences (2001) #1, Thunderbolts: From the Marvel Vault (2011) #1, Citizen V and the V-Battalion (2001) #1-3, Citizen V and the V-Battalion: The Everlasting (2002) #1-4)
  - Volume 3 (collects Thunderbolts (1997) #64-75 and #100-109, Avengers/Thunderbolts #1-6, New Thunderbolts #1-18 and Thunderbolts Presents: Zemo - Born Better #1-4)
- Thunderbolts: Uncaged Omnibus (collects Thunderbolts (2006) #144-174 and #163.1, Dark Avengers #175-190, and the Thunderbolts story from Enter the Heroic Age #1)

Epic Collection

- Vol. 1: Justice, Like Lighting - Thunderbolts #1-12, -1, Thunderbolts '97 Annual, The Incredible Hulk #449, Spider-Man Team-Up #7, Heroes For Hire #7, and material from Tales of the Marvel Universe special
- Vol. 2: Wanted Dead of Alive - Thunderbolts #13-25, 0; Captain America and Citizen V Annual 1998, Avengers #12

The Classic era

- Thunderbolts: Marvel's Most Wanted (collects the first appearances of the six original members from Captain America vol. 1 #168, The Incredible Hulk vol. 1 #228-229, Marvel Two-in-One #56, Strange Tales #123 and 141–143, Avengers vol. 1 #21-22, 176 pages, softcover, February 1998, 0-7851-0655-3)
- Thunderbolts: First Strikes (collects Thunderbolts #1-2, 48 pages, softcover, December 1997, 978-0-7851-0577-0)
- Thunderbolts: Justice Like Lightning... (collects Thunderbolts #1-4, Thunderbolts '97 Annual, The Incredible Hulk #449, Tales of the Marvel Universe special and Spider-Man Team-Up #7, 224 pages, softcover, December 2001, 0-7851-0817-3)
- Thunderbolts Classic:
  - Volume 1 (collects Thunderbolts #1-5, Thunderbolts: Distant Rumblings #-1, Thunderbolts '97 Annual, The Incredible Hulk #449, Tales of the Marvel Universe one-shot and Spider-Man Team-Up #7, 296 pages, April 2011, 0-7851-5309-8)
  - Volume 2 (collects Thunderbolts #6-14, and Heroes for Hire #7, 256 pages, March 2012, 0-7851-5965-7)
  - Volume 3 (collects Thunderbolts #15-22, 0, and Captain America & Citizen V Annual '98; Avengers Vol. 3 #12, 288 pages, softcover, August 15, 2012, 0-7851-6239-9)
- Hawkeye and the Thunderbolts:
  - Volume 1 (collects Thunderbolts #23-37, Thunderbolts Annual 2000, Avengers Annual 2000, 456 pages, softcover, May 3, 2016, 0-7851-9528-9)
  - Volume 2 (collects Thunderbolts #38-50, Avengers Vol. 3 #31-34; 440 pages July 2016 978-0785195474)
- The Avengers/Thunderbolts:
  - Volume 1: The Nefaria Protocols (collects The Avengers #31-34 and Thunderbolts #42-44, 184 pages, softcover, March 2004, 0-7851-1445-9)
  - Volume 2: Best Intentions (collects Avengers/Thunderbolts #1-6, 144 pages, softcover, November 2004, 0-7851-1422-X)

The "Fightbolts" era

- Thunderbolts: How to Lose (by John Arcudi, collects Thunderbolts #76-81, 120 pages, softcover, November 2003, 0-7851-1248-0)

The New Thunderbolts era

- New Thunderbolts:
  - Volume 1: One Step Forward (collects New Thunderbolts #1-6, 144 pages, softcover, June 2005, 0-7851-1565-X)
  - Volume 2: Modern Marvels (collects New Thunderbolts #7-12, 144 pages, softcover, November 2005, 0-7851-1794-6)
  - Volume 3: Right of Power (collects New Thunderbolts #13-18 and Thunderbolts #100, 184 pages, softcover, June 2006, 0-7851-1832-2)
- Civil War: Thunderbolts (collects Thunderbolts #101-105, 120 pages, softcover, May 2007, 0-7851-1947-7)
- Thunderbolts: The Guardian Protocols (collects Thunderbolts #106-109, 96 pages, July 2007, 0-7851-2246-X)
- Thunderbolts Presents: Zemo - Born Better (by Fabian Nicieza, collects 4-issue mini-series, 96 pages, August 2007, 0-7851-2621-X)

The post-Civil War era

- Thunderbolts by Warren Ellis and Mike Deodato Ultimate Collection (collects Thunderbolts #110-121 and material from Civil War: The Initiative one-shot, 296 pages, softcover, September 2011, 978-0-7851-5849-3) covers the same core series issues as:
  - Thunderbolts: Faith in Monsters (collects Thunderbolts #110-115, "Thunderbolts: Desperate Measures", Civil War: Choosing Sides and Civil War: The Initiative, 192 pages, hardcover, September 2007, 0-7851-2568-X, softcover, January 2008, 0-7851-2566-3)
  - Thunderbolts: Caged Angels (collects Thunderbolts #116-121, 144 pages, hardcover, September 2008, ISBN 0-7851-2635-X, softcover, December 2008, 0-7851-2567-1)
- Thunderbolts: Secret Invasion (collects Thunderbolts: Breaking Point one-shot, Thunderbolts: International Incident one-shot, Thunderbolts: Reason in Madness and Thunderbolts #122-125, 168 pages, Marvel Comics, softcover, March 2009, 0-7851-2394-6)
- Penance: Relentless (by Paul Jenkins, collects 5-issue limited series, 120 pages, July 2008, 0-7851-2857-3)

The Dark Reign era

- Thunderbolts: Burning Down The House (collects Thunderbolts #126-129 and 132, 112 pages, hardcover, August 2009, 0-7851-3152-3, softcover, November 2009, 0-7851-3166-3)
- Dark Reign: Deadpool/Thunderbolts (collects Thunderbolts #130-131 and Deadpool vol. 2, #8-9, 96 pages, softcover, July 2009, 0-7851-4090-5)
- Thunderbolts: Widowmaker (collects Thunderbolts #133-137, premiere hardcover, 120 pages, December 2009, 0-7851-4006-9, softcover, May 2010, 0-7851-4091-3)
- Siege: Thunderbolts (collects Thunderbolts #138-143, 144 pages, premiere hardcover, September 2010, ISBN 0-7851-4373-4, softcover, January 2011, 0-7851-4374-2)

The Heroic Age era

- Thunderbolts: Cage (collects Thunderbolts #144-147 and stories from Enter the Heroic Age one-shot, 112 pages, hardcover, October 2010, ISBN 0-7851-4774-8, softcover, March 2011, 0-7851-4775-6)
- Shadowland: Thunderbolts (collects Thunderbolts #148-151, 144 pages, hardcover, April 2011, 0-7851-5218-0)
- Thunderbolts: Violent Rejection (collects Thunderbolts #152-157, 280 pages, softcover, August 2011, 0-7851-5221-0)
- Fear Itself: Thunderbolts (collects Thunderbolts #158-162, 120 pages, hardcover, February 2012, 0-7851-5798-0)
- Thunderbolts: The Great Escape (collects Thunderbolts #163, #163.1, 164–168, 168 pages, softcover, March 2012, 0-7851-6170-8)
- Thunderbolts: Like Lightning (collects Thunderbolts #169-174, 144 pages, softcover, September 2012, 0-7851-6171-6)
- Dark Avengers: The End is the Beginning (collects Dark Avengers #175-183, 208 pages, softcover, February 2013, 0-7851-6172-4)
- Dark Avengers: Masters of Evil (collects Dark Avengers #184-190, 168 pages, softcover, July 2013, 0-7851-6847-8)

The Marvel Now Era

- Thunderbolts Volume 1: No Quarter (collects Thunderbolts vol. 2 #1-6, 136, softcover, May 2013, 978-0785166948)
- Thunderbolts Volume 2: Red Scare (collects Thunderbolts vol. 2 #7-12, 136, softcover, October 2013, 978-0785166955)
- Thunderbolts Volume 3: Infinity (collects Thunderbolts vol. 2 #13-19, 136, softcover, January 2014, 978-0785166962)
- Thunderbolts Volume 4: No Mercy (collects Thunderbolts vol. 2 #20-26, 160, softcover, August 2014, 978-0785189824)
- Thunderbolts Volume 5: Punisher vs. the Thunderbolts (collects Thunderbolts Vol. 2 27–32, 168, softcover, January 2015, 978-0785189831)

Thunderbolts Vol 3 (2016–2017)

- Thunderbolts Vol. 1: There Is No High Road (collects Thunderbolts vol. 3 #1-6, 136, softcover, December 2016, 978-0785196686)
- Thunderbolts Vol. 2: No Going Back (collects Thunderbolts vol. 3 #7-12, 144, softcover, July 2017, 978-0785196693)
- Thunderbolts: Winter Soldiers (collects Thunderbolts vol. 3 #1-12, 280, softcover, March 2025, 978-1302953096)

Thunderbolts Vol 4 (2022–2023)

- Thunderbolts: Back on Target (collects Thunderbolts vol. 4 #1-5, 128, softcover, March 2023, 978-1302947118)

Thunderbolts Vol 5 (2024)

- Thunderbolts: Worldstrike (collects Thunderbolts vol. 5 #1-4 and Devil's Reign: Winter Soldier, 136, softcover, June, 2024, 978-1302955663)
