= X-Men Classics (action figure) =

Series of action figures by Toy Biz

- Type: Action figures
- Invented by: Marvel Comics
- Company: Toy Biz
- Country: United States
- Availability: 2004–2005
- Materials: Plastic
- Features: X-Men

X-Men Classics is a series of 6-inch X-Men action figures by Toy Biz.

The first line was released in 2004 and consisted of comic accurate sculpts and paint applications. The line went on hiatus after one wave.

The line was revamped in 2005 and lasted three waves. It featured several new sculpts of both completely original costumes and previously unproduced costumes with repaints of existing figures scattered throughout.

Series	Release	Figure	Accessories	Description
1	2004	Archangel		Missile-firing wings
1	2004	Cyclops		Jim Lee costume, light-up visor
1	2004	Gambit	Disk shooter	Light-up eyes
1	2004	Wolverine	Wild Sentinel	New X-Men costume
1	2004	Wolverine		Tiger Stripe
2	2005	Archangel		Series 1 repaint
2	2005	Gambit	Disk shooter	Series 1 repaint
2	2005	Magneto	Light-up backpack	
2	2005	Wolverine		Ninja Strike
2	2005	Cyclops	Missile-firing cannon	Ruby quartz armor, light-up visor
2	2005	Beast		Stealth
2	2005	Beast		Stealth, cat-faced variant
2	2005	Wolverine		Stealth; Body would later be reused for the 2007 Marvel Legends two-pack Cable figure from Hasbro
2	2005	Storm		White repaint of Marvel Legends Series 8
3	2005	Wolverine	Jetpack	Air Strike, House of M S.H.I.E.L.D. costume
3	2005	Angel		Bird of Prey
3	2005	Juggernaut		Pound 'n Punch action
3	2005	Cyclops	Cannon	Stealth, light-up visor
3	2005	Beast		Tech gear
4	2005	Avalanche	Vibrating rockslide base	
4	2005	Colossus		Retooled/repaint of Marvel Legends Series 5
4	2005	Iceman	Rolling iceslide	Normal
4	2005	Iceman	Rolling iceslide	Ultimate variant
4	2005	Iceman	Rolling iceslide	Ice-off Bobby Drake variant
4	2005	Jean Grey	Flame display base	Phoenix (only 3 made)
4	2005	Rogue		X-Treme X-Men costume, short hair and jacket
4	2005	Rogue		X-Treme X-Men costume, long hair and no jacket variant
4	2005	Nightcrawler	Two swords	Ultimate, light-up eyes and mouth
4	2005	Sabretooth	Interchangeable hands	Ultimate, slashing action

== Vehicles ==
Vehicle	Figure	Description
X-Treme Mutant Motorcycle	Cyclops	
X-Treme Mutant Motorcycle	Wolverine	
Mutant Racer	Wolverine	Repaint/retooled Marvel Legends series 3 "unmasked"
X-Jet	Wolverine	Repaint from X-Men, Astonishing X-Men repaint/retool of Series 1
	Sentinel	12-Inch
	Sentinel	14-Inch, redeco of the 1992 X-Men: The Animated Series line

== See also ==
- Marvel Legends
- Spider-Man Classics
- Hulk Classics
