= Marvel Legends =

Canadian/American comic book dolls (produced 2002– )

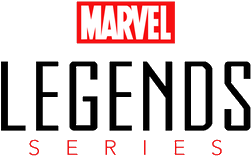
- Type: Action figures
- Invented by: Marvel Comics
- Company: Toy Biz (2002–06); Hasbro (2006–14)
- Country: United States
- Availability: 2002–14
- Materials: Plastic
- Features: Marvel Universe

Marvel Legends is an action figure line based on the characters of Marvel Comics, initially produced by Toy Biz, then by Hasbro. This line is in the 6-inch (150 mm) scale, with spin-off lines in the 4-inch (100 mm), 8-inch (200 mm), and 12-inch (300 mm) scale.

The line initially began in 2002 as a spin-off of Spider-Man Classics, both produced by Toy Biz. It copied the clam-shell packaging and the included comic book that had shipped with the Spider-Man Classics line. The first wave featured the heroes of Iron Man, Captain America, and the Hulk, with Toad as the villain. Beginning January 1, 2007, Hasbro became the new license holder to the rights to produce toys and games based upon the Marvel Universe. The new Hasbro packaging did not include a comic book and the new molds eliminated finger joints, which were a mainstay during the Toy Biz era, but the company did continue with the theme of Build-A-Figure pieces. During the late 2000s, production on the Marvel Legends line slowed down to the point where it was rumored that it may be cancelled, but Hasbro revealed (at the 2010 San Diego Comic-Con) that due to fan requests and the upcoming movies based on Marvel characters, the line would be making a comeback in 2012, and in January 2012, Marvel Legends returned to store shelves.

At the 2013 San Diego Comic Con, Hasbro announced that Marvel Legends would be given a new start as the Marvel Legends Infinite Series starting with the Mandroid series. Initially, the Marvel Legends line has used the "chase" concept to introduce figures based on less popular or recognisable characters. These got their nickname by being shipped in fewer quantities than the rest of the figures, thus causing collectors to chase after them. Eventually, rather than entirely new figures, the chase concept evolved into variants (such as an alternate head or a different colour scheme) of a figure released in that same series. These figures retained being sought after by collectors. A Marvel Legends Flatman "figure" was included as a joke cut-out in the GLX-Mas Special (2005). It featured "infinite" points of articulation and three action phrases (to be said with one's own voice).

== Toy Biz ==
Series	Release	Figure	Accessories	Description	Comic
1	May 2002	Captain America	Destroyed building and American flag display		Captain America (1968) #109
1	May 2002	Hulk	Destroyed wall stand	Bendable fingers	The Incredible Hulk (1968) #314
1	May 2002	Hulk	Destroyed wall stand	Straight fingers and white shirt variant	The Incredible Hulk (1968) #314
1	May 2002	Iron Man	Stark Industries sign stand and removable mask	Model 3 armor version	Iron Man (1968) #149
1	May 2002	Iron Man	Stark Industries sign stand and removable mask	Model 2 (horned) gold version	Iron Man (1968) #149
1	May 2002	Iron Man	Stark Industries sign stand and removable mask	Stealth armor version variant	Iron Man (1968) #149
1	May 2002	Toad	Swamp display base	Frog permanently in hand Non-Legends figure from the unreleased "Evolution of X" two-pack from X-Men	Uncanny X-Men (1963) #4
2	September 2002				
2	September 2002	Doctor Doom	Castle tower display base, pistol and removable mask		Fantastic Four (1961) #247
2	September 2002	Doombot	Castle tower display base, pistol and removable mask	Variant	Fantastic Four (1961) #247
2	September 2002	Human Torch	Flame flight stand from pre-Legends Marvel's Most Wanted X-Man figure	"4" on chest	Fantastic Four (1961) #233
2	September 2002	Human Torch	Flame flight stand from pre-Legends Marvel's Most Wanted X-Man figure	No "4" variant	Fantastic Four (1961) #233
2	September 2002	Namor	Trident and water display base		The Sub-Mariner (1968) #67
2	September 2002	Thing	Yancy Street wall display base		Fantastic Four (1961) #263
2	September 2002	Thing	Trenchcoat, sunglasses and Yancy Street wall display base		Fantastic Four (1961) #263
3	December 2002	Daredevil	Church window stand	Daredevil (film) version	Daredevil (1964) #164
3	December 2002	Ghost Rider (Danny Ketch)	Motorcycle		Ghost Rider (1990) #2
3	December 2002	Magneto	Removable helmet and disembodied Sentinel head display base		X-Men (1991) #2
3	December 2002	Thor	Mjolnir and Frost Giant display base		Thor (1998) #39
3	December 2002	Wolverine	Hellfire Club guards display base	Masked; Retool of "Evolution of X" two-pack from X-Men (2000 film)	Uncanny X-Men (1963) #133
3	December 2002	Wolverine	Hellfire Club guards display base	Unmasked variant	Uncanny X-Men (1963) #133
4	June 2003	Beast	Pull-up bar display base		Uncanny X-Men (1963) #264 (presented as X-Men #3)
4	June 2003	Elektra	2 swords, 2 sai, back scabbards and samurai stand		Daredevil (1964) #176
4	June 2003	Gambit	Flaming cards, staff and Sentinel right hand stand		Gambit (1999) #1 (presented as X-Men #4)
4	June 2003	Goliath (Hank Pym), Ant-Man (Scott Lang), and Wasp		Repaint of Avengers #1 (Non-Legends) Giant-Man, Ant-Man and Wasp mini-figures	The Avengers (1963) #28
4	June 2003	Punisher	2 guns and war zone display base	White belt	The Punisher War Zone (1992) #1
4	June 2003	Punisher	2 guns and war zone display base	Black belt variant	The Punisher War Zone (1992) #1
5	November 2003	Blade	Sword, gun and motorcycle	Blade II version	Originally Tomb of Dracula (1972) #45, then poster book of Blade II
5	November 2003	Colossus	Disembodied Sentinel torso display base		Uncanny X-Men (1963) #129
5	November 2003	Mister Fantastic	Interchangeable arms and Fantasticar display base		Fantastic Four (2002) #60
5	November 2003	Nick Fury	Gun and flaming jetpack flight stand		Nick Fury, Agent of S.H.I.E.L.D. (1968) #4 (presented as #1)
5	November 2003	Red Skull	Peak cap, gun and battlefield display base		Captain America (1968) #16
5	November 2003	Sabretooth	Disembodied Sentinel leg display base		X-Men (1991) #6
5	November 2003	Silver Surfer and Howard the Duck	Surfboard		Silver Surfer (1968) #11
6	September 2004	Cable	Interchangeable Minigun/hoverbike display base	Blue uniform version	Cable (1993) #73
6	September 2004	Cable	Interchangeable Minigun/hoverbike display base	Brown variant	Cable (1993) #73
6	September 2004	Deadpool and Doop	2 guns, 2 swords and flight stand (for Doop)		Deadpool (1997) #4
6	September 2004	Jean Grey	Phoenix Force display base	Phoenix version	Uncanny X-Men (1963) #101
6	September 2004	Jean Grey	Phoenix Force display base	Dark Phoenix variant	Uncanny X-Men (1963) #101
6	September 2004	Juggernaut	Destroyed Xavier Institute display base		Uncanny X-Men (1963) #13
6	September 2004	Punisher	Bazooka, pistol, 2 rifles and display stand	The Punisher (2004 film) version	The Amazing Spider-Man (1963) #129
6	September 2004	Wolverine	Ogun base with Muramasa blade	Brown costume version	Uncanny X-Men (1963) #213
6	September 2004	Wolverine	Ogun base with Muramasa blade	Unmasked variant (Series 3 re-release)	Uncanny X-Men (1963) #213
7	December 2004	Apocalypse	Egyptian display stand		X-Factor (1986) #25
7	December 2004	Ghost Rider (Johnny Blaze)	Motorcycle		
7	December 2004	Ghost Rider (Johnny Blaze)	Flaming motorcycle	Phasing variant	
7	December 2004	Goliath (Hank Pym), Ant-Man (Scott Lang), and Wasp		Series 4 rerelease	Avengers (1963) #28
7	December 2004	Hawkeye	6 arrows, bow, quiver and Sky-Cycle on rock flight stand	Classic version	Avengers (1963) #223
7	December 2004	Hawkeye	6 arrows, bow, quiver and Sky-Cycle on rock flight stand	Knuckle guard bow variant	Avengers (1963) #223
7	December 2004	Iron Man	Rocket pack display base and removable mask	Silver Centurion armor	Iron Man (1968) #200
7	December 2004	Vision	Flight stand		Avengers (1963) #135
7	December 2004	Vision	Flight stand	Phasing variant	Avengers (1963) #135
7	December 2004	Wolverine	Helmet, Weapon X stand	Weapon X program version	X-Men Legends Poster Book
8	December 2004	Black Widow (Natasha Romanova)	Black Widow logo flight stand		Daredevil (1964) #81
8	December 2004	Yelena Belova	Black Widow logo flight stand	Variant	Daredevil (1964) #81
8	December 2004	Ultimate Captain America	Flight stand	Early shipments have a paint error with grey paint on 616 pants and blue on Ultimate. A running change corrected this.	Poster book and trading card
8	December 2004	Captain America	Flight stand	Earth-616 variant	Poster book and trading card
8	December 2004	Doctor Octopus	Web display base		Marvel Age Spider-Man (2004) #2
8	December 2004	Doombot	Castle tower display base, pistol and removable mask	Series 2 rerelease	Marvel Age Spider-Man (2004) #4
8	December 2004	Iceman	Ice pillar and Sentinel display base		Uncanny X-Men (1963) #18
8	December 2004	Iron Man	Ultron display base and removable mask	Model 21 Tin Man armor version	Poster book and trading card
8	December 2004	Man-Thing	Swamp display base		Ultimate Marvel Team-Up (2001) #7
8	December 2004	Storm	Lightning cloud flight stand	Long haired Jim Lee version	Uncanny X-Men (1963) #96
8	December 2004	Storm	Lightning cloud flight stand	Mohawk variant	Uncanny X-Men (1963) #96
Legendary Riders	September 2005	Iron Man	Glider	Hulkbuster armor version	Iron Man (1968) #305
Legendary Riders	September 2005	Scarlet Witch	Scooter		Avengers (1963) #187
Legendary Riders	September 2005	Taskmaster	Sky-Cycle (same as packaged with Hawkeye), gun, sword and cane		Avengers (1963) #196
Legendary Riders	September 2005	Thing	Jet scooter	First appearance version	Fantastic Four (1961) #1
Legendary Riders	September 2005	Ultron	Glider	Ultimate Alliance version	Avengers (1998) #22
Legendary Riders	September 2005	Vengeance	Motorcycle		Ghost Rider (1990) #39
Legendary Riders	September 2005	Wolverine	Motorcycle	Days of Future Past Logan, black T-shirt/green pants	Uncanny X-Men (1963) #141
Legendary Riders	September 2005	Wolverine	Motorcycle	Younger Logan, white T-shirt/blue pants and cowboy hat variant	Uncanny X-Men (1963) #141
Legendary Riders	September 2005	Wonder Man and Yellowjacket	Red jet scooter	Small Yellowjacket attaches to shoulder	Avengers (1998) #51
Legendary Riders	September 2005	Wonder Man and Yellowjacket	Red jet scooter	Translucent purple ionic variant, small Yellowjacket attaches to shoulder	Avengers (1998) #51

=== Build-A-Figure ===
In 2005, Toy Biz introduced the "Build-A-Figure" (referred to as a "BAF" in the collector community) starting with series 9. Each figure in the series was packaged with a piece of a larger figure. A consumer who bought each figure in the assortment would then have all the complete components to assemble a character unavailable in individual packaging.

Build-A-Figure	Release	Figure	Accessories	Description	Comic	Build-A-Figure Piece
Galactus	February 2005	Bullseye			Daredevil (1964) #132	Left leg
Galactus	February 2005	Bullseye		Gritting teeth/gray variant	Daredevil (1964) #132	Left leg
Galactus	February 2005	Deathlok	Gun		Deathlok (1990) #3	Upper torso
Galactus	February 2005	Hulk		Gray first appearance/closed mouth version	The Incredible Hulk (1962) #1	Left arm
Galactus	February 2005	Hulk		Green version variant	The Incredible Hulk (1962) #1	Left arm
Galactus	February 2005	Nightcrawler			Poster book	Lower torso
Galactus	February 2005	Doctor Strange			4 selections from Strange Tales	Right arm
Galactus	February 2005	War Machine	6 blast effect pieces	U.S. War Machine version	Iron Man (1968) #281	Right leg
Galactus	February 2005	Professor X	Cerebro helmet and wheelchair		Uncanny X-Men (1963) #117	Head
Sentinel	September 2005	Angel	Flight stand	Red costume version	Uncanny X-Men (1963) #5	Left leg
Sentinel	September 2005	Angel	Flight stand	Light blue costume variant	Uncanny X-Men (1963) #5	Left leg
Sentinel	September 2005	Black Panther	Flight stand	Marvel Knights version	Avengers (1963) #87	Right arm
Sentinel	September 2005	Cyclops	Flight stand	Blue and yellow costume version	Uncanny X-Men (1963) #201	Left arm
Sentinel	September 2005	Cyclops	Flight stand	X-Factor costume variant	Uncanny X-Men (1963) #201	Left arm
Sentinel	September 2005	Mister Sinister	Flight stand		Uncanny X-Men (1963) #243	Right leg
Sentinel	September 2005	Mystique	Flight stand		Poster Book	Lower torso
Sentinel	September 2005	Omega Red	2 tentacles		X-Men (1991) #7	Lower torso
Sentinel	September 2005	Spider-Man	Flight stand	First appearance Steve Ditko version	Origin story from Amazing Fantasy (1963) #15 and Amazing Spider-Man (1963) #8	Head and upper torso
Apocalypse (Classic and Black versions)	December 2005	Bishop	2 guns	Long haired Jim Lee version	Bishop (1994) #2	Lower torso
Apocalypse (Classic and Black versions)	December 2005	Bishop	2 guns	Bald variant	Bishop (1994) #2	Lower torso
Apocalypse (Classic and Black versions)	December 2005	Iron Fist	2 flame effect pieces	Classic version	Iron Fist (1975) #8	Right leg
Apocalypse (Classic and Black versions)	December 2005	Iron Fist	2 flame effect pieces	Red costume H'ylthri clone variant	Iron Fist (1975) #8	Right leg
Apocalypse (Classic and Black versions)	December 2005	Maestro	Crown	Some packaged without the hose for connecting the left arm to the Apocalypse torso piece.	Captain Marvel (1999) #30	Left arm and arm tube
Apocalypse (Classic and Black versions)	December 2005	Sasquatch			Alpha Flight (1983) #10	Right arm and arm tube
Apocalypse (Classic and Black versions)	December 2005	Snowbird		Albino Sasquatch variant	Alpha Flight (1983) #10	Right arm and arm tube
Apocalypse (Classic and Black versions)	December 2005	Wolverine		Astonishing X-Men version	Astonishing X-Men (2004) #3	Left leg
Apocalypse (Classic and Black versions)	December 2005	Wolverine		Unmasked variant	Astonishing X-Men (2004) #3	Left leg
Apocalypse (Classic and Black versions)	December 2005	X-23		Black costume version	Uncanny X-Men (1963) #451	Head and upper torso
Apocalypse (Classic and Black versions)	December 2005	X-23		Purple costume and wavy hair variant	Uncanny X-Men (1963) #451	Head and upper torso
Onslaught	May 2006	Abomination	Diorama		The Incredible Hulk (2000) #25	Left arm
Onslaught	May 2006	Abomination	Diorama	Melted face variant	The Incredible Hulk (2000) #25	Left arm
Onslaught	May 2006	Blackheart			Ghost Rider/Wolverine/Punisher: Hearts of Darkness (1991) OGN	Left leg
Onslaught	May 2006	Green Goblin	Goblin Glider, pumpkin bomb and diorama		Amazing Spider-Man (1963) #122	Right leg
Onslaught	May 2006	Green Goblin	Goblin Glider, pumpkin bomb and diorama	Unmasked Norman Osborn variant	Amazing Spider-Man (1963) #122	Right leg
Onslaught	May 2006	Lady Deathstrike			Wolverine (1988) #77	Upper torso
Onslaught	May 2006	Loki	Sword and diorama		Loki (2004) #1 (presented as Journey Into Mystery #116)	Right arm
Onslaught	May 2006	Loki	Sword and diorama	Crown of Lies variant	Loki (2004) #1 (presented as Journey Into Mystery #116)	Right arm
Onslaught	May 2006	Pyro			Daredevil (1964) #355	Lower torso
Mojo	August 2006	Falcon and Redwing		Classic version	Falcon (1983) #1	Lower torso
Mojo	August 2006	Falcon and Redwing		Modern costume variant	Falcon (1983) #1	Lower torso
Mojo	August 2006	Iron Man	Removable mask	First appearance gray armor version	Tales of Suspense (1963) #39 & 40	Metasoma
Mojo	August 2006	Iron Man	Removable mask	Gold variant	Tales of Suspense (1963) #39 & 40	Metasoma
Mojo	August 2006	Longshot			X-Men (1991) #10	Right legs
Mojo	August 2006	Luke Cage			Hero For Hire (1972) #1	Left legs
Mojo	August 2006	Psylocke			Uncanny X-Men (1963) #258	Back torso
Mojo	August 2006	Heinrich Zemo	Scepter and diorama		Avengers (1963) #6	Head and upper torso
Mojo	August 2006	Heinrich Zemo	Scepter and diorama	Unmasked variant	Avengers (1963) #6	Head and upper torso
MODOK	October 2006	Beta Ray Bill	Stormbreaker hammer		Thor (1966) #337	Hover base
MODOK	October 2006	Iron Man	Diorama and removable mask	Thorbuster armor version	Iron Man (1998) #64	Right arm
MODOK	October 2006	Destroyer		Variant	Iron Man (1998) #64	Right arm
MODOK	October 2006	Captain Marvel (Mar-Vell)	Diorama		Captain Marvel (1968) #25	Control panel
MODOK	October 2006	Captain Marvel (Genis-Vell)	Diorama	Variant	Captain Marvel (1968) #25	Control panel
MODOK	October 2006	Moon Knight	Diorama		Marvel Team-Up (2004) #7	Left arm
MODOK	October 2006	Moon Knight	Diorama	Silver variant	Marvel Team-Up (2004) #7	Left arm
MODOK	October 2006	Spider-Woman (Jessica Drew)	Diorama		Spider-Woman (1978) #1	Head
MODOK	October 2006	Spider-Woman (Julia Carpenter)	Diorama	Variant	Spider-Woman (1978) #1	Head
MODOK	October 2006	Wasp	Diorama	Modern version	Avengers (1963) #195	Legs
MODOK	October 2006	Wasp	Diorama	Shoulder length hair, red costume variant	Avengers (1963) #195	Legs
MODOK	October 2006	Wasp	Diorama	Blue costume variant (extremely rare)	Avengers (1963) #195	Legs

=== Box Sets ===
Name	Release	Figure	Accessories	Description	Pack-in
X-Men Legends	September 2003	Beast	Glasses and lab coat, round X-Men logo stand		X-Men Legends poster book
X-Men Legends	September 2003	Gambit	Vinyl trench coat and round X-Men logo stand		X-Men Legends poster book
X-Men Legends	September 2003	Magneto	Removable helmet and round X-Men logo stand	Retool of the Series III Magneto with a new head sculpt	X-Men Legends poster book
X-Men Legends	September 2003	Rogue	Round X-Men logo stand	Exclusive	X-Men Legends poster book
X-Men Legends	September 2003	Wolverine	Round X-Men logo stand	Unmasked, blue/yellow costume version	X-Men Legends poster book
Urban Legends	September 2003	Daredevil	Billy club and display stand	Red	Urban Legends poster book
Urban Legends	September 2003	Elektra	Display stand, two swords, two sai and removable weapons holder	White costume version Repaint of Series IV Elektra	Urban Legends poster book
Urban Legends	September 2003	Punisher	Display stand, bazooka and removable trench coat	Black coat version	Urban Legends poster book
Urban Legends	September 2003	Spider-Man	Display stand		Urban Legends poster book
Spider-Man vs. Sinister 6	September 2004	Black Cat	Round stand	Exclusive	Spider-Man vs. Sinister 6 poster book
Spider-Man vs. Sinister 6	September 2004	Doctor Octopus	Round stand	(Non-Legends) Spider-Man Classics reissue with lab coat	Spider-Man vs. Sinister 6 poster book
Spider-Man vs. Sinister 6	September 2004	Electro	Round stand	Exclusive	Spider-Man vs. Sinister 6 poster book
Spider-Man vs. Sinister 6	September 2004	Green Goblin	Goblin Glider	Retool of the Spider-Man Classics Series 2 Hobgoblin figure with a new head and glider	Spider-Man vs. Sinister 6 poster book
Spider-Man vs. Sinister 6	September 2004	Kraven the Hunter	Round stand	Reissue of the (Non-Legends) Spider-Man Classics version with a new head	Spider-Man vs. Sinister 6 poster book
Spider-Man vs. Sinister 6	September 2004	Spider-Man	Round stand		Spider-Man vs. Sinister 6 poster book
Spider-Man vs. Sinister 6	September 2004	Venom	Round base	Remolded from Series 5 Sabretooth; Exclusive	Spider-Man vs. Sinister 6 poster book
Fantastic Four	December 2004	Doctor Doom	Display stand, pistol and removable mask and cloak	Repaint of Series II Doctor Doom with a new scarred headsculpt under the mask	Fantastic Four poster book
Fantastic Four	December 2004	H.E.R.B.I.E.	Flight stand	Exclusive	Fantastic Four poster book
Fantastic Four	December 2004	Human Torch	Display stand	Partial flame-on version Repaint of the Series II Human Torch with a new head	Fantastic Four poster book
Fantastic Four	December 2004	Human Torch		Translucent variant	Fantastic Four poster book
Fantastic Four	December 2004	Invisible Woman	Display stand	Dark blue costume version Exclusive	Fantastic Four poster book
Fantastic Four	December 2004	Invisible Woman	Display stand	Translucent variant Exclusive	Fantastic Four poster book
Fantastic Four	December 2004	Mister Fantastic	Display stand, alternate ball form and removable lab coat	Dark blue costume/lab coat version Repaint of the Series V Mr. Fantastic with a new head and accessories	Fantastic Four poster book
Fantastic Four	December 2004	Franklin Richards		Exclusive	Fantastic Four poster book
Fantastic Four	December 2004	Thing	Display stand		Fantastic Four poster book
Spider-Man vs. The Fearsome Foes	September 2005	Carnage		Spider-Man Classics (Non-Legends) repaint with a new head	Spider-Man vs. The Fearsome Foes poster book
Spider-Man vs. The Fearsome Foes	September 2005	Lizard		Exclusive	Spider-Man vs. The Fearsome Foes poster book
Spider-Man vs. The Fearsome Foes	September 2005	Rhino		Exclusive	Spider-Man vs. The Fearsome Foes poster book
Spider-Man vs. The Fearsome Foes	September 2005	Spider-Man		Repaint of the Series 12 Spider-Man with a new head	Spider-Man vs. The Fearsome Foes poster book
Spider-Man vs. The Fearsome Foes	September 2005	Vulture			Spider-Man vs. The Fearsome Foes poster book
Young Avengers	May 2006	Wiccan	Staff, satchel, removable scarf and display stand	Exclusive	Young Avengers (2005) #1
Young Avengers	May 2006	Hulkling	Display stand	Exclusive	Young Avengers (2005) #1
Young Avengers	May 2006	Iron Lad	Display stand	Exclusive	Young Avengers (2005) #1
Young Avengers	May 2006	Patriot	Shield and display stand	Exclusive	Young Avengers (2005) #1
Monsters	May 2006	Dracula	Removable cape and display base	Exclusive	Monsters poster book
Monsters	May 2006	Frankenstein's Monster	Display base	Exclusive	Monsters poster book
Monsters	May 2006	Werewolf by Night	Display base	Exclusive	Monsters poster book
Monsters	May 2006	Zombie	Display base	Exclusive	Monsters poster book
House of M	November 2006	Hulk	Display base	House of M version Exclusive	Secrets of the House of M #1
House of M	November 2006	Iron Man	Arm cannon, rocket pack and flight stand	House of M version Exclusive	Secrets of the House of M #1
House of M	November 2006	The It	Display base	House of M version Exclusive	Secrets of the House of M #1
House of M	November 2006	Inhuman Torch (Kristoff Vernard)	Flight stand	House of M version Exclusive	Secrets of the House of M #1

==== Face-Off (2006) ====
Each set includes a base with a background and flight stands.

Series	Release	Name	Figure	Accessories	Description	Comic
1	May 2006	Captain America versus Red Skull	Captain America	Shield	Retool of Ultimate Captain America	Captain America (2002) #32
1	May 2006	Captain America versus Red Skull	Red Skull	Dagger		Captain America (2002) #32
1	May 2006	Captain America versus Baron Strucker (Variant)	Captain America	Shield	Unmasked variant	Captain America (2002) #32
1	May 2006	Captain America versus Baron Strucker (Variant)	Baron Strucker			Captain America (2002) #32
1	May 2006	Daredevil versus Kingpin	Daredevil	Billy club		Daredevil (1964) #171
1	May 2006	Daredevil versus Kingpin	Kingpin	Walking stick		Daredevil (1964) #171
1	May 2006	Daredevil versus Kingpin (Variant)	Daredevil	Billy club	Unmasked variant	Daredevil (1964) #171
1	May 2006	Daredevil versus Kingpin (Variant)	Kingpin	Walking stick	Angry face and black suit variant	Daredevil (1964) #171
1	May 2006	Hulk versus Leader	Hulk			The Incredible Hulk (1968) #115
1	May 2006	Hulk versus Leader	Leader		Modern version	The Incredible Hulk (1968) #115
1	May 2006	Hulk versus Leader (Variant)	Hulk		Screaming variant	The Incredible Hulk (1968) #115
1	May 2006	Hulk versus Leader (Variant)	Leader		Classic variant	The Incredible Hulk (1968) #115
2	November 2006					
2	November 2006	Wolverine versus Sabretooth	Wolverine		First appearance version	Wolverine (1988) #10
2	November 2006	Wolverine versus Sabretooth	Sabretooth		First appearance version	Wolverine (1988) #10
2	November 2006	Wolverine versus Sabretooth (Variant)	Wolverine		Screaming variant	Wolverine (1988) #10
2	November 2006	Wolverine versus Sabretooth (Variant)	Sabretooth		Screaming variant	Wolverine (1988) #10
2	November 2006	Iron Man versus Mandarin	Iron Man	Removable mask	Modular armor version	Iron Man (1968) #311
2	November 2006	Iron Man versus Mandarin	The Mandarin			Iron Man (1968) #311
2	November 2006	War Machine versus Mandarin (Variant)	War Machine	Removable mask		Iron Man (1968) #311
2	November 2006	War Machine versus Mandarin (Variant)	The Mandarin		Red costume variant	Iron Man (1968) #311
2	November 2006	Punisher versus Jigsaw	Punisher	3 guns and combat knife	Classic version	Punisher (1987) #36
2	November 2006	Punisher versus Jigsaw	Jigsaw	3 guns and combat knife	Punisher costume version	Punisher (1987) #36
2	November 2006	Punisher versus Jigsaw (Variant)	Punisher	3 guns and combat knife	Modern version	Punisher (1987) #36
2	November 2006	Punisher versus Jigsaw (Variant)	Jigsaw	3 guns and combat knife	Business suit version	Punisher (1987) #36

== Hasbro ==
After Hasbro gained the rights to produce Marvel toys, the company continued with the theme of Build-A-Figure pieces. Also, Hasbro's new molds mostly eliminated finger joints, a mainstay of the Toy Biz era, and the comic book pack-ins.

- All the figures in the Terrax and Arnim Zola waves were labelled with a "The Return of Marvel Legends" sticker.
- The Hit-Monkey, Rocket Raccoon, and Jubilee waves used the "Mini" Build-A-Figure concept.

== Exclusives ==
Marvel released multiple exclusive toys in the series.

== Showdown ==
Marvel Legends Showdown is a collectible tabletop game in which the primary component is 4-inch (100 mm) action figures and cards. It was a collaboration between Upper Deck Entertainment and Toy Biz. Originally known as Marvel Superhero Showdown.

== Unleashed (2008) ==
Figures are 8-inch (200 mm). The figures were produced by Hasbro and feature multiple points of articulation.

Wave	Figure	Description
1	Spider-Man	
1	Green Goblin	Marvel Knights costume version
2	Spider-Man	Symbiote costume version
2	Doctor Octopus	
3	Iron Man	Anti-radiation armor version

== Icons ==
The series is 12-inch (300 mm).

=== Toy Biz ===
Figures come with an "Evolution of an Icon" comic sized book including a history and statistics of the character as well as artwork.

Series	Release	Figure	Accessories	Description
1	2006	Captain America	Shield	Masked
1	2006	Captain America	Shield	Unmasked variant
1	2006	Iron Man	2 blast effects, removable mask	Upscaled version of Armor Model 24
1	2006	Iron Man	2 blast effects, removable mask	Gold variant
1	2006	Wolverine		Masked
1	2006	Wolverine		Unmasked variant
2	2006	Hulk		Green
2	2006	Hulk		Gray variant
2	2006	Venom		Upscaled version of the (Non-Legends) Spider-Man Classics Symbiote Blast figure
2	2006	Venom		Unmasked variant
3	2006	Beast		Gray
3	2006	Beast	Lab coat and glasses	Blue variant
3	2006	Spider-Man		Masked
3	2006	Spider-Man		Unmasked variant

=== Hasbro ===
Wave	Release	Figure	Accessories	Description
1	2007	Thor	Mjolnir	Cloth cape
1	2007	Wolverine		Toy Biz series 1 repaint, brown costume
2	2007	Doctor Doom	Pistol	Cloth cape
2	2007	Punisher	M-16, knife, pistol	
3	2007	Human Torch		Regular
3	2007	Human Torch		Flame-off Johnny Storm
3	2007	Silver Surfer	Surfboard	
4	2007	Cyclops		
4	2007	Magneto	Helmet	Cloth cape
5	2009	Daredevil	Batons	Red
5	2009	Daredevil	Batons	Yellow & brown
5	2009	Nightcrawler		
6	2009			
6	2009	Colossus		
6	2009	Jean Grey		Phoenix version
6	2009	Jean Grey		Dark Phoenix variant

==== 12-Inch ====
In 2016, 12-inch Legends returned effectively reviving the concept of the Icons line in all but name. The figures are more expensive and are therefore aimed at a more adult collector market.

Release	Figure	Accessories	Description
2016	Iron Man	Alternate unmasked head, interchangeable hands and blast effects	
2016	Captain America	Shield, alternate unmasked head and helmet and interchangeable hands	Marvel NOW! version
2016	Spider-Man	2 alternate heads and four interchangeable hands	
2017	Deadpool and Headpool	2 alternate heads, 2 katanas, 2 guns, four alternate hands, 2 knives, a chimichanga and flight stand for Headpool	
2017	Spider-Man	Alternate unmasked head and 4 interchangeable hands	Symbiote costume version (Target exclusive)
2017	Thor	Alternate helmeted head, 2interchangeable hands and 2 Mjolnirs	
2017	Hulk	Alternate head and 2 interchangeable hands	
2017	Daredevil	Alternate unmasked head and mask, six interchangeable hands and 2 batons	San Diego Comic Con exclusive
2018	Black Panther	Alternate unmasked head, Vibranium spear and 2 sets of interchangeable hands	Black Panther version
2018	Wolverine	2 alternate heads and a mask, 2 interchangeable hands and 2 interchangeable shoulder pads	

== Prop Replicas ==
In 2016, Hasbro announced a line of high end role play accessories. After the release of the first two items, a poll was held to determine future entries in the line.

Item	Release	Features	Description
Iron Man's helmet	2016	Removable faceplate Light-up eyes Sound effects	Iron Man version
Captain America's shield	2016	Adjustable straps	Classic comic version
Captain America's shield	2016	Adjustable straps	Captain America: The First Avenger version
Mjolnir	2017	Voice-activated light-up Odin symbol Sound effects Display stand	Thor version
Star-Lord's helmet	2017	Bluetooth speakers Light-up eyes	Guardians of the Galaxy version
Captain America's shield	2017	Adjustable straps	75th Anniversary version
Black Panther's mask	2018	Light-up Vibranium effect Retractable lenses	Black Panther version
Infinity Gauntlet	2018	Light-up Infinity Stones; Sound effects Articulated fingers	Avengers: Infinity War version
Ant-Man's helmet	2019	LEDs (Antenna)	Avengers: Endgame version
Power Gauntlet	2019	Light-up Infinity Stones; Sound effects Articulated fingers	Avengers: Endgame version
War Machine's helmet	2019	Light-up LED eyes Sound effects Removable magnetic faceplate	Punisher skull logo version
Deadpool's head	2020	Moves and speaks Can sync up with programmable voice app	Classic comic version
Stormbreaker	2020	Light-up effects Thunder sound effects	Avengers: Endgame version
Captain America's shield	2020	Adjustable strap	The Falcon and the Winter Soldier version
Eye of Agamotto	2021	LED lights Removable Time Stone; Display base	Doctor Strange version
Nano Gauntlet	2021	Light-up and removable Infinity Stones; Sound effects Articulated fingers	Avengers: Endgame version
Captain America's shield	2021	Adjustable strap	Captain America: The Winter Soldier stealth version
Iron Spider's helmet	2021	2 LED light-up eyes settings	Avengers: Endgame version
Magneto's helmet	2023	Display base	X-Men '97 version
Captain Carter's shield	2023	Adjustable strap	What If...? version
Iron Man's helmet	2024	Light-up eyes	Avengers: Endgame MK LXXXV version
Green Goblin's mask	2024		Spider-Man: No Way Home version
Green Goblin's pumpkin bomb	2024	Lights, sound effects, and Green Goblin cackle	Spider-Man: No Way Home version
Doctor Doom's helmet	2025	Hood and Latverian display stand	Classic comic version
Spider-Man's mask	2025	Display stand and remote-controlled expressive eyes	Spider-Man: Homecoming version
Wolverine's mask	2025	Display stand	Deadpool & Wolverine version
Daredevil's mask and billy clubs	2025	Display stand	Daredevil: Born Again version
Hulk Hands	2026	Sound effects	Classic comic version
Cyclops' visor	2026	Lights	X-Men '97 version
Spider-Man (Miles Morales)' mask	2026	Remote control, movable eyes and display stand	Marvel's Spider-Man 2 version

=== Box sets ===
Set	Release	Figure	Accessories	Description
Tesseract and Loki	2022	Tesseract	LED lights	Loki version
Tesseract and Loki	2022	TVA Loki	Flaming sword	Loki version

== Retro 3.75-Inch ==
Smaller figures done in the style of the superhero toys made by Kenner and Mattel during the 1980s. Each figure features five points of articulation and retro-inspired packaging.

Wave	Figure	Accessories	Description
Wave 1	Captain America	Shield	
Wave 1	Spider-Man		
Wave 1	Ms. Marvel (Carol Danvers)		Classic version
Wave 1	Hulk		
Wave 1	Magneto		Classic version
Wave 1	Human Torch		
Wave 2	Black Panther		Classic version
Wave 2	Black Panther		Metallic variant Hasbro Pulse exclusive
Wave 2	Iron Man		Classic version
Wave 2	Iron Man		Metallic variant Hasbro Pulse exclusive
Wave 2	Daredevil	2 billy clubs	Classic version
Wave 2	Iceman		Classic version
Wave 2	Elektra	2 sais	
Wave 2	Electro		Classic version
Wave 3	Cyclops		Classic version
Wave 3	Invisible Woman		Negative Zone costume version
Wave 3	Ant-Man (Hank Pym)		Classic version
Wave 3	Vision		Classic version
Wave 3	Bullseye	2 sais	
Wave 3	Grey Hulk		Redeco of the Wave 1 Hulk
Wave 4	Storm		Classic version
Wave 4	U.S. Agent	Shield	Classic version Redeco of the Wave 1 Captain America
Wave 4	Loki		Classic version
Wave 4	Silver Surfer	Surfboard	
Wave 4	Symbiote Spider-Man		Redeco of the Wave 1 Spider-Man
Wave 4	Stealth Armor Iron Man		Redeco of the Wave 2 Iron Man
Wave 5	Falcon	Redwing	Classic version
Wave 5	Wolverine		Brown and yellow costume version
Wave 5	Wolverine		Blue and yellow costume version Two-pack exclusive
Wave 5	Jean Grey		Phoenix version Two-pack exclusive
Wave 5	Jean Grey		Dark Phoenix version
Wave 5	Venom		Classic version
Wave 5	Mister Fantastic		Negative Zone costume version
Wave 6	Thor	Mjolnir	Classic version
Wave 6	The Thing		Negative Zone costume version
Wave 6	Black Widow	Grappling hook gun	Classic version
Wave 6	Green Goblin	Goblin Glider and satchel	Classic version
Wave 7	Spider-Man		Amazing Fantasy #15 version
Wave 7	Moon Knight		Classic version
Wave 7	Nova (Richard Rider)		Classic version
Wave 7	Firestar		Classic version
Wave 8	Doctor Doom		Classic version
Wave 8	Luke Cage		Classic version
Wave 8	Spider-Woman (Jessica Drew)		Classic version
Wave 8	Spectacular Spider-Man		Classic version
Wave 8	Hulk	Card Color Variant	Classic version
Wave 8	Wolverine	Classic Yellow Costume	Classic version

=== Deluxe Retro 3.75" ===
Oversized figures and vehicles in the 3.75" scale.

Figure	Accessories	Description
Sentinel	Tendril, blast effect piece and alternate battle-damaged head	Classic version
Ghost Rider	Flame Cycle	Classic version

== Announced ==
Release	Wave	Figure	Accessories	Description	Build-A-Figure Piece
Fall 2022	Infinity Ultron (What If...?)	Moon Knight	2 crescent darts and alternate hands	Moon Knight version	
Fall 2022	Infinity Ultron (What If...?)	Mr. Knight	2 truncheons and alternate hands	Moon Knight version	Right arm
Fall 2022	Infinity Ultron (What If...?)	Hawkeye	Bow, quiver and alternate hands	Hawkeye version	Left arm
Fall 2022	Infinity Ultron (What If...?)	Kate Bishop	Bow, quiver and alternate hands	Hawkeye version	Right leg
Fall 2022	Infinity Ultron (What If...?)	Ms. Marvel (Kamala Khan)	Alternate hands	Ms. Marvel version	Torso
Fall 2022	Infinity Ultron (What If...?)	Sharon Carter	Baton, combat knife and alternate hands	The Falcon and the Winter Soldier version	Head and lance
Fall 2022	Infinity Ultron (What If...?)	She-Hulk	Alternate hands	She-Hulk: Attorney at Law version	Left leg
Fall 2022	Attuma (Black Panther: Wakanda Forever)	Black Panther	Alternate hands	Who is the Black Panther? version	Left leg
Fall 2022	Attuma (Black Panther: Wakanda Forever)	Nakia	2 ring blades, alternate hands and alternate helmeted head	Black Panther: Wakanda Forever version	Torso
Fall 2022	Attuma (Black Panther: Wakanda Forever)	Namor	Spear and alternate hands	Black Panther: Wakanda Forever version	Left arm
Fall 2022	Attuma (Black Panther: Wakanda Forever)	Okoye	Vibranium spear and dagger	Black Panther: Wakanda Forever version Retool of the 2018 BAF	Head
Fall 2022	Attuma (Black Panther: Wakanda Forever)	Everett K. Ross	Pistol	Black Panther: Wakanda Forever version Repaint of the Target exclusive figure	Right arm and 2 weapons
Fall 2022	Attuma (Black Panther: Wakanda Forever)	Hatut Zeraze Trooper	Rifle, pistol and 4 alternate hands		Right leg
Winter 2022	Khonshu (Moon Knight)	He Who Remains	Apple	Loki version	Head
Winter 2022	Khonshu (Moon Knight)	Classic Loki	2 magic effect pieces and alternate head and spellcasting hands	Loki version	Left leg
Winter 2022	Khonshu (Moon Knight)	Jimmy Woo	Badge and alternate playing card hand	WandaVision version	Left arm and staff
Winter 2022	Khonshu (Moon Knight)	Howard the Duck	Severed Scott Lang head	What If...? version	Torso
Winter 2022	Khonshu (Moon Knight)	Zombie Scarlet Witch	2 hex effect pieces	What If...? version Retool of the Abomination wave Scarlet Witch figure with a new head and coat	Right leg
Winter 2022	Khonshu (Moon Knight)	Zombie Iron Man	Alternate hands and 2 blast effect pieces	What If...? version Retool and redeco of the Thanos wave Iron Man figure with a new head	
Winter 2022	Khonshu (Moon Knight)	Red Skull	Tesseract	What If...? version Retool and redeco of the SDCC exclusive Red Skull figure with a new head	Right arm
Spring 2023	Puff Adder	Iron Man	Alternate hands and 2 repulsor blast effect pieces	Iron Man: Extremis version	
Spring 2023	Puff Adder	Ultimate Captain America	Shield and alternate hands	The Ultimates version	Head
Spring 2023	Puff Adder	Yelena Belova	Sniper rifle, shoulder strap, pistol, silenced pistol, 2 blast effect pieces, 2 smoke effect pieces and alternate hands	Thunderbolts version	Torso
Spring 2023	Puff Adder	Baron Strucker	2 energy effect pieces	Classic version	Right leg
Spring 2023	Puff Adder	Wonder Man	2 belt fire effect pieces and alternate hands	Classic version	Left arm and alternate hand
Spring 2023	Puff Adder	Molecule Man	2 energy effect pieces	Classic version	Left leg
Spring 2023	Puff Adder	Orb	Ray gun		Right arm and alternate hand
Spring 2023	Cassie Lang (Ant-Man and the Wasp: Quantumania)	Ant-Man (Scott Lang)	Alternate unmasked head and hands	Ant-Man and the Wasp: Quantumania version	
Spring 2023	Cassie Lang (Ant-Man and the Wasp: Quantumania)	Wasp (Hope van Dyne)	Wing pack, retracted backpack, alternate unmasked head and hands	Ant-Man and the Wasp: Quantumania version	Right leg
Spring 2023	Cassie Lang (Ant-Man and the Wasp: Quantumania)	Kang the Conqueror	Alternate hands	Ant-Man and the Wasp: Quantumania version	Heads
Spring 2023	Cassie Lang (Ant-Man and the Wasp: Quantumania)	Future Ant-Man			Right arm and alternate hand
Spring 2023	Cassie Lang (Ant-Man and the Wasp: Quantumania)	Ultron	Kirby Krackle effect piece and 3 alternate hands	Avengers: Rage of Ultron version Retool of the Ursa Major wave Ultron with a new head	Left arm and alternate hand
Spring 2023	Cassie Lang (Ant-Man and the Wasp: Quantumania)	Egghead	Blaster pistol	Classic version	Torso
Spring 2023	Cassie Lang (Ant-Man and the Wasp: Quantumania)	Crossfire	Rifle, shoulder strap, gunfire effect piece, smoke effect piece and alternate hands	Classic version	Left leg
Spring 2023	Cosmo the Spacedog (Guardians of the Galaxy Vol. 3)	Star-Lord	2 blasters	Guardians of the Galaxy Vol. 3 version	
Spring 2023	Cosmo the Spacedog (Guardians of the Galaxy Vol. 3)	Nebula	Pistol, rifle and alternate sword hand	Guardians of the Galaxy Vol. 3 version	Left rear leg
Spring 2023	Cosmo the Spacedog (Guardians of the Galaxy Vol. 3)	Drax the Destroyer	2 knives	Guardians of the Galaxy Vol. 3 version	Right front leg
Spring 2023	Cosmo the Spacedog (Guardians of the Galaxy Vol. 3)	Rocket Raccoon	Rifle	Guardians of the Galaxy Vol. 3 version	Head and torso
Spring 2023	Cosmo the Spacedog (Guardians of the Galaxy Vol. 3)	Mantis		Guardians of the Galaxy Vol. 3 version	Right rear leg
Spring 2023	Cosmo the Spacedog (Guardians of the Galaxy Vol. 3)	Kraglin	Yaka arrow and knife	Guardians of the Galaxy Vol. 3 version	Left front leg
Spring 2023	Cosmo the Spacedog (Guardians of the Galaxy Vol. 3)	Adam Warlock		Guardians of the Galaxy Vol. 3 version	Tail and helmet
Summer 2023	Ch'od	Cyclops	Alternate hands	Astonishing X-Men version	
Summer 2023	Ch'od	Emma Frost	Alternate hands	Astonishing X-Men version	Right leg
Summer 2023	Ch'od	M	Alternate hands	Generation X version	Left leg
Summer 2023	Ch'od	Chamber	Alternate hands	Generation X version	Left arm
Summer 2023	Ch'od	Kid Omega	Psionic shotgun and alternate hands	X-Force version	Torso
Summer 2023	Ch'od	Corsair	Cutlass, blaster pistol and alternate hands	Starjammers version	Right arm
Summer 2023	Ch'od	Fang	Alternate hands	Classic version	Head and Cr'reee
Fall 2023	Hulk (Amadeus Cho) (Totally Awesome Hulk)	Captain Marvel (Carol Danvers)	2 energy effect pieces and alternate hands	The Marvels version	Left leg
Fall 2023	Hulk (Amadeus Cho) (Totally Awesome Hulk)	Ms. Marvel (Kamala Khan)	Flerken and alternate hands	The Marvels version	Torso
Fall 2023	Hulk (Amadeus Cho) (Totally Awesome Hulk)	Photon	Alternate hands	The Marvels version	Right leg
Fall 2023	Hulk (Amadeus Cho) (Totally Awesome Hulk)	Marvel Boy (Noh-Varr)	Twin Kree blasters	Young Avengers version	Left arm and alternate hand
Fall 2023	Hulk (Amadeus Cho) (Totally Awesome Hulk)	Commander Rogers	Energy shield	Secret Avengers version	Head
Fall 2023	Hulk (Amadeus Cho) (Totally Awesome Hulk)	Iron Man	2 blast effect pieces and alternate hands	Heroes Return Renaissance Armor version	
Fall 2023	Hulk (Amadeus Cho) (Totally Awesome Hulk)	Karnak	Alternate hands	Classic version	Right arm and alternate hand
Fall 2023	Mindless One	Daredevil	Billy clubs and bladed staff	King Daredevil version	
Fall 2023	Mindless One	Luke Cage	Alternate hands	Power Man and Iron Fist version	Left leg
Fall 2023	Mindless One	Blade	Katana, 2 glaives, 2 stakes and alternate hands	Modern version	Head and energy effect piece
Fall 2023	Mindless One	Clea	Alternate hands and 2 spell effect pieces	Classic version	Right arm and alternate hand
Fall 2023	Mindless One	Iron Man	2 repulsor effect pieces and alternate hands	Marvel's Midnight Suns version	Right leg
Fall 2023	Mindless One	Lady Bullseye	Katana, 2 fans and 2 sais		Torso
Fall 2023	Mindless One	Fist Ninja	Ninjato, kama, alternate hands and alternate skull head	Retool of the Stilt-Man wave Hand ninja figure	Left arm and alternate hand
Fall 2023	Hydra Stomper MK II (What If...?)	Nick Fury	Pistol, silenced pistol and smoke effect piece	Secret Invasion version	Left leg
Fall 2023	Hydra Stomper MK II (What If...?)	Talos	Alternate Skrull head and hands	Secret Invasion version	Right leg
Fall 2023	Hydra Stomper MK II (What If...?)	Kingpin	Cane	Hawkeye version	
Fall 2023	Hydra Stomper MK II (What If...?)	Yelena Belova	2 batons and alternate hands	Hawkeye version	Torso
Fall 2023	Hydra Stomper MK II (What If...?)	Agatha Harkness		WandaVision version	Heads and jetpack
Fall 2023	Hydra Stomper MK II (What If...?)	Warrior Gamora	Double-bladed sword	What If...? version	Left arm and alternate hand
Fall 2023	Hydra Stomper MK II (What If...?)	Goliath (Bill Foster)		What If...? version	Right arm and alternate hand
2024	The Void	Black Panther	Alternate hands	Marvel Knights version Retool of the Attuma wave Black Panther figure with a new cape and gold ornamentation	
2024	The Void	Namor	Trident and 4 alternate hands	Savage version	Arms and alternate hands
2024	The Void	Power Princess	Sword, shield and alternate hands	Heroes Reborn version	Legs
2024	The Void	Vision	Alternate hands	Classic version	Head
2024	The Void	Justice	Alternate hands	New Warriors version	Back tentacles
2024	The Void	Namorita	Alternate hands	New Warriors version	Torso
2024	The Void	Crystar	Sword, shield and alternate hands	Classic version	Back tentacles
2024	Zabu	Iron Man	2 repulsor effect pieces, alternate hands and alternate unmasked head	Superior Iron Man version	
2024	Zabu	Cable	2 guns and alternate hands	Marvel vs. Capcom 2 version	Rear right leg
2024	Zabu	Wolfsbane	Alternate hands	X-Factor version	Body
2024	Zabu	Ikaris	Alternate hands	Classic version	Front right leg
2024	Zabu	Ka-Zar	Spear, knife and 4 alternate hands		Front left leg
2024	Zabu	Black Winter	Hammer, alternate hands and shadow effect piece	Retool of the Controller wave Thor figure with a new head and cape	Head
2024	Zabu	Red Widow	Bladed staff	Winter Guard version	Rear left leg
2024	Blackheart	Moon Knight	Ankh, 4 crescent darts and alternate hands	West Coast Avengers version Redeco of the Walgreens exclusive Moon Knight with new costume ornament parts and accessories	Head
2024	Blackheart	Bloodstorm	Alternate head and hands	Mutant X version	Torso
2024	Blackheart	Hellverine	Alternate hands	Weapons of Vengeance version Retool of the Tri-Sentinel wave Wolverine with a new flaming skull and claws	
2024	Blackheart	Dracula	Sword and alternate head and hands	Curse of the Mutants version	Left arm and alternate claw
2024	Blackheart	Daimon Hellstrom	Pitchfork and alternate hands		Right leg
2024	Blackheart	Brother Voodoo	Staff, 2 energy effect pieces and 4 alternate hands	Sorcerer Supreme version	Left leg
2024	Blackheart	Lilith	Cape and alternate hands		Right arm and alternate claw
2025	Nemesis (Uncanny X-Force)	Wolverine		X-Treme X-Men version Retool of the Retro Wolverine with new legs	
2025	Nemesis (Uncanny X-Force)	Nightcrawler	Alternate head, 3 alternate hands and sword	Uncanny X-Force version Retool and redeco of the X-Men '97 Nightcrawler figure with a new head	Helmet
2025	Nemesis (Uncanny X-Force)	Gambit	Staff and alternate hands	Age of Apocalypse version	Right leg
2025	Nemesis (Uncanny X-Force)	Husk	Alternate transformed head, alternate hands and torn flesh	Generation X version	Torso and skull
2025	Nemesis (Uncanny X-Force)	Cyclops	Alternate head, optic blast effect and alternate hands	X-Factor version	Right arm
2025	Nemesis (Uncanny X-Force)	Marrow	2 bone swords and alternate hands	Marvel vs. Capcom 2 version	Left arm
2025	Nemesis (Uncanny X-Force)	Fabian Cortez	Alternate hands and 2 energy effect pieces	Fatal Attractions version	Left leg
2025	Executioner	Logan	Alternate hands, machine gun, combat knife, satchel and alternate head	World War 2 version	
2025	Executioner	Iron Man	2 wrist blasters, 2 repulsor effect pieces and alternate hands	Fall of X Mark 72 Armor version	Head and axe
2025	Executioner	Werewolf by Night		Classic version	Left arm and alternate hand
2025	Executioner	Spider-Man (Ai Apaec)	Alternate head and hands	Dark Avengers version	Right leg
2025	Executioner	Enchantress	Magical effect piece and alternate hand		Torso
2025	Executioner	Phantom Rider	2 pistols and 3 alternate hands		Left leg
2025	Executioner	Warbow	Crossbow and alternate hands		Right arm
2026	Box	Ghost Rider (Robbie Reyes)	Chain, hammer, crowbar and alternate hands	Marvel NOW! version	Left leg
2026	Box	Wolverine	Alternate hands	Ultimate Wolverine version	
2026	Box	Psylocke	Psychic butterfly effect piece and alternate hands	Outback version	Right leg
2026	Box	Hawkeye (Bullseye)	Bow, quiver, arrow and alternate hands	Dark Avengers version	Right arm and alternate hand
2026	Box	Lady Deadpool	2 guns and 2 swords	Deadpool Corps version	Head
2026	Box	U.S. Agent	Photon shield and alternate hands	Force Works version	Left arm and hand
2026	Box	Marrina Smallwood	Alternate hands	Alpha Flight version	Torso

=== Non-BAF waves ===
Release	Wave	Figure	Accessories	Description
Spring 2023	Across the Spider-Verse wave 1	Spider-Man (Miles Morales)	Alternate unmasked head and hands	Spider-Man: Across the Spider-Verse version
Spring 2023	Across the Spider-Verse wave 1	Spider-Gwen	Alternate unmasked head and hands	Spider-Man: Across the Spider-Verse version
Spring 2023	Across the Spider-Verse wave 1	Spider-Man 2099	Alternate hands	Spider-Man: Across the Spider-Verse version
Spring 2023	Across the Spider-Verse wave 1	Spider-Woman (Jessica Drew)	Alternate hands	Spider-Man: Across the Spider-Verse version
Spring 2023	Across the Spider-Verse wave 1	Spider-Punk	Guitar and alternate hand	Spider-Man: Across the Spider-Verse version
Spring 2023	Across the Spider-Verse wave 1	The Spot	2 portal effect pieces and alternate hands	Spider-Man: Across the Spider-Verse version
Spring 2023	Across the Spider-Verse wave 1	Spider-Man (Peter B. Parker)	Alternate hands	Spider-Man: Into the Spider-Verse version Retool of the Stilt-Man wave Peter B. Parker figure with a new head and arms
Fall 2023	X-Men 97 wave 1	Wolverine	Alternate unmasked head and cowl	X-Men '97 version Retool of the Hasbro Pulse exclusive Wolverine with a new unmasked head, pinless limbs and accessories
Fall 2023	X-Men 97 wave 1	Storm	Alternate hands	X-Men '97 version Retool of the Hasbro Pulse exclusive Storm with a new head and pinless limbs
Fall 2023	X-Men 97 wave 1	Magneto	Alternate hands	X-Men '97 version Retool of the Family Matters Magneto figure with a new head, chest, cape and pinless limbs
Fall 2023	X-Men 97 wave 1	Bishop	Blaster and alternate hands	X-Men '97 version
Fall 2023	X-Men 97 wave 1	Rogue	Alternate gloveless hand and glove-clenching hand	X-Men '97 version Retool and redeco of the Target exclusive Retro Rogue figure with a new head and pinless limbs
Fall 2023	X-Men 97 wave 1	Gambit	Staff, playing card and alternate card-throwing hand	X-Men '97 version Retool of the Target exclsuvie Gambit figure with a new head and coat
Fall 2023	Spider-Man: No Way Home	Spider-Man	Alternate unmasked head and 4 alternate hands	Spider-Man: No Way Home new red and blue suit version
Fall 2023	Spider-Man: No Way Home	Friendly Neighborhood Spider-Man	Alternate unmasked head and alternate hands	Spider-Man: No Way Home version Retool of the Hasbro Pulse box set figure with a new alternate head
Fall 2023	Spider-Man: No Way Home	Amazing Spider-Man	Alternate unmasked head and alternate hands	Spider-Man: No Way Home version Retool of the Hasbro Pulse box set figure with a new alternate head
Fall 2023	Spider-Man: No Way Home	MJ	Macchina di Kadavus and alternate hands	Spider-Man: No Way Home version Retool of the Target exclusive Homecoming MJ with a new torso, arms and hairpiece
Fall 2023	Spider-Man: No Way Home	Matt Murdock	White cane and brick	Spider-Man: No Way Home version
Fall 2023	Spider-Man: No Way Home	Sandman	Alternate enlarged hands, alternate hands and 2 alternate forearms	Spider-Man: No Way Home version
2024	X-Men '97 wave 2	Magneto	Alternate head and hands	X-Men '97 Xavier School headmaster version
2024	X-Men '97 wave 2	Cyclops	Alternate head, alternate hands and optic blast effect piece	X-Men '97 version Retool and redeco of the Hasbro Pulse Cyclops figure with new heads
2024	X-Men '97 wave 2	Jean Grey	Alternate head and hands	X-Men '97 version
2024	X-Men '97 wave 2	Nightcrawler	Alternate head and hands	X-Men '97 version Retool and redeco of the Wendigo wave Nightcrawler figure with new head and pinless limbs
2024	X-Men '97 wave 2	X-Cutioner	Rifle, spear, baton and alternate Sentinel cannon hand	X-Men '97 version
2024	X-Men '97 wave 2	Goblin Queen	Baby Nathan Summers, alternate hands and 2 magic effect pieces	X-Men '97 version
2024	Deadpool & Wolverine	Wolverine	Alternate unmasked head and alternate hands	Deadpool & Wolverine version
2024	Deadpool & Wolverine	Deadpool	Twin katanas, combat knife and alternate hands	Deadpool & Wolverine version
2024	Deadpool & Wolverine	Logan	Headpool, flight stand and alternate hands	Deadpool & Wolverine version
2024	Across the Spider-Verse wave 2	Spider-Man (Miles Morales)	Alternate hands and unmasked head	Spider-Man: Across the Spider-Verse version Retool of the previous Miles Morales figure with a new, movie-accurate alternate head
2024	Across the Spider-Verse wave 2	Spider-Gwen	LYLA, alternate hands and unmasked head	Spider-Man: Across the Spider-Verse version Redeco of the previous Spider-Gwen figure
2024	Across the Spider-Verse wave 2	Spider-Man 2099	Alternate hands and unmasked head	Spider-Man: Across the Spider-Verse version Retool of the previous Spider-Man 2099 figure with a new unmasked head
2024	Across the Spider-Verse wave 2	Spider-Man (Pavitr Prabhakar)	Web-shooter, alternate hands and unmasked head	Spider-Man: Across the Spider-Verse version
2024	Across the Spider-Verse wave 2	Spider-Punk	Guitar, alternate hand and alternate head	Spider-Man: Across the Spider-Verse version Retool and redeco of the previous Spider-Punk figure with new headsculpts
2024	Across the Spider-Verse wave 2	Miles G. Morales/Prowler (Earth-42)	Alternate hands, backpack and alternate unmasked head	Spider-Man: Across the Spider-Verse version
2024	Across the Spider-Verse wave 2	Spider-Man (Peter A. Parker)	Alternate hands and unmasked head	Spider-Man: Into the Spider-Verse version Retool of the Peter B. Parker figure with a new unmasked head and legs
Spring 2025	Gamerverse Legends	Symbiote Spider-Man	Web-line and 4 alternate hands	Spider-Man 2 version
Spring 2025	Gamerverse Legends	Spider-Man (Miles Morales)	2 web splat effect pieces and 4 alternate hands	Spider-Man 2 Brooklyn 2099 Suit version
Spring 2025	Gamerverse Legends	Anti-Venom Spider-Man	Alternate head and 4 alternate hands	Spider-Man 2 version
Spring 2025	Gamerverse Legends	Spider-Man (Miles Morales)	2 venom blast effect pieces and 4 alternate hands	Spider-Man 2 Upgraded Suit version Repaint of the Spider-Man: Miles Morales figure
Spring 2025	Gamerverse Legends	Black Cat	Wand of Watoomb and alternate hands	Spider-Man 2 version
Spring 2025	Gamerverse Legends	Spider-Man (Miles Morales)	Web-line and 4 alternate hands	Spider-Man 2 Boricua Suit version
Summer 2025	Fantastic Four: First Steps	Mr. Fantastic	Alternate elongated and bendable arms and alternate hands	The Fantastic Four: First Steps version
Summer 2025	Fantastic Four: First Steps	Invisible Woman	Force field effect piece and alternate hands	The Fantastic Four: First Steps version
Summer 2025	Fantastic Four: First Steps	The Thing	Alternate hands	The Fantastic Four: First Steps version
Summer 2025	Fantastic Four: First Steps	Human Torch	Alternate hands and 2 flame effect pieces	The Fantastic Four: First Steps version
Summer 2025	Fantastic Four: First Steps	Silver Surfer (Shalla-Bal)	Surboard, power cosmic display base and 3 alternate hands	The Fantastic Four: First Steps version
Summer 2025	Fantastic Four: First Steps	Flame-On Human Torch	2 flame effect pieces and alternate hands	The Fantastic Four: First Steps version
Fall 2025	X-Men '97 wave 3	Logan	Playing cards and alternate hands	X-Men '97 civilian outfit version
Fall 2025	X-Men '97 wave 3	Jubilee	2 alternate explosion effect hands, soda cup and alternate hands	X-Men '97 version
Fall 2025	X-Men '97 wave 3	Cable	2 guns, 2 blast effect pieces and alternate hands	X-Men '97 version
Fall 2025	X-Men '97 wave 3	Sunspot	2 fireball effect pieces and alternate hands	X-Men '97 version
Fall 2025	X-Men '97 wave 3	Morph	Alternate Kevin Sidney head, alternate Henry Peter Gyrich head and alternate hands	X-Men '97 version
Fall 2025	X-Men '97 wave 3	Emma Frost	Alternate head and hands	X-Men '97 version
Winter 2026	Deadpool and Wolverine wave 2	Wolverine	Alternate head and hands	Deadpool & Wolverine battle-damaged version Retool of the previous MCU Wolverine figure with bare arms and a new head
Winter 2026	Deadpool and Wolverine wave 2	Blade	Sword, gun, alternate hands, alternate head and 2 sunglasses	Deadpool & Wolverine version
Winter 2026	Deadpool and Wolverine wave 2	X-23	Alternate head and hands, backpack, sunglasses and Juggernaut's helmet	Deadpool & Wolverine version
Winter 2026	Deadpool and Wolverine wave 2	Cowboypool	2 pistols, 4 alternate hands and twirling gun effect piece	Deadpool & Wolverine version
Winter 2026	Deadpool and Wolverine wave 2	Cassandra Nova	Alternate hands and Mr. Paradox head	Deadpool & Wolverine version
Winter 2026	Deadpool and Wolverine wave 2	Wolverine	Cowl, alternate neck and alternate hands	Deadpool & Wolverine brown suit version
Summer 2026	Deadpool & Wolverine wave 3	X-Force Deadpool	2 pistols, 2 katanas, knife and 6 alternate hands	Deadpool & Wolverine concept art version Black and gray repaint of the previous MCU Deadpool figure with an added chest harness
Summer 2026	Deadpool & Wolverine wave 3	Wolverinepool	Alternate hands	Deadpool & Wolverine concept art version Retool of the previous MCU Wolverine figure with a new head and Deadpool color scheme
Summer 2026	Deadpool & Wolverine wave 3	Cavillrine	Alternate head and hands	Deadpool & Wolverine version
Fall 2026	Avengers: Doomsday wave 1	Doctor Doom	Alternate hands	Avengers: Doomsday version
Fall 2026	Avengers: Doomsday wave 1	Captain America (Sam Wilson)	Shield and backpack	Avengers: Doomsday version Retool of the Captain America: Brave New World Captain America figure with a new head and no wings
Fall 2026	Avengers: Doomsday wave 1	Cyclops	Alternate visor, optic blast effect piece and alternate hands	Avengers: Doomsday version
Fall 2026	Avengers: Doomsday wave 1	Shang-Chi	2 floating Ten Rings effect pieces, 2 alternate Ten Rings wristbands and 4 alternate hands	Avengers: Doomsday version Retool of the Mr. Hyde wave Shang-Chi figure with a new head, legs, skirt piece and accessories
Fall 2026	Avengers: Doomsday wave 1	Gambit	Staff, 2 playing cards, kinetic cards effect piece and alternate hands	Avengers: Doomsday version
Fall 2026	Avengers: Doomsday wave 1	Thor	Mjolnir, Stormbreaker axe and alternate head	Avengers: Doomsday version Retool of the Cull Obsidian wave Thor figure with a new head and arms
Fall 2026	X-Men '97 wave 4	Cyclops	Alternate head and hands	X-Men '97 Season 2 X-Corporation uniform version
Fall 2026	X-Men '97 wave 4	Jean Grey	Alternate hands and 2 telekinetic effect pieces	X-Men '97 Season 2 X-Corporation uniform version
Fall 2026	X-Men '97 wave 4	Death (Gambit)	Flippable Tarot card deck	X-Men '97 Season 2 version Black redeco and retool of the Season 1 Gambit figure with a new coat
Fall 2026	X-Men '97 wave 4	Polaris	2 magnetic effect pieces and alternate hands	X-Men '97 Season 2 version
Fall 2026	X-Men '97 wave 4	Havok	3 energy effect pieces and alternate hands	X-Men '97 Season 2 version
Fall 2026	X-Men '97 wave 4	Vindicator	Alternate head and hands	X-Men '97 Season 2 version
2027	Avengers: Doomsday wave 2	Nightcrawler	2 swords and alternate hands	Avengers: Doomsday version
2027	Avengers: Doomsday wave 2	Beast	Tablet, glasses, alternate head and hands	Avengers: Doomsday version
2027	Avengers: Doomsday wave 2	Lord Doom	2 Darkhold books and alternate hands	Avengers: Doomsday concept art version

=== Single releases ===
Release	Figure	Accessories	Description
2022	Winter Soldier	Alternate unmasked head, combat knife, assault rifle, pistol and submachine pistol	The Falcon and the Winter Soldier Hydra flashback version Retool of the Mandroid wave Winter Soldier with a new head and accessories, as well as a more MCU-accurate color scheme
2022	Black Panther (Shuri)	Alternate hands	Black Panther: Wakanda Forever version
2023	Moon Knight	Crescent moon throwing disc, 3 smaller crescent moon darts, bo staff, 2 combat batons and alternate hands	Modern version Rerelease of the Vulture wave Moon Knight; Fan channel exclusive
2023	War Machine	Uni-beam effect piece, 2 repulsor effect pieces, energy blast effect piece and alternate hands	Marvel vs. Capcom: Clash of Super Heroes version Redeco of the Ursa Major wave Modular Iron Man; Fan channel exclusive
2023	Spider-Man	Web-line, alternate hands and 5 web effect pieces	Spider-Man 2 version Fan channel exclusive
2023	Spider-Man (Miles Morales)	Spider-Cat, alternate venom blast hands, 2 venom blast effect pieces and alternate hands	Spider-Man 2 version Retool of the Armadillo wave Miles Morales figure with new arms and accessories Fan channel exclusive
2024	The Spot	2 portal effect pieces and alternate hands	Spider-Man: Across the Spider-Verse version Black redeco of the previous Spot figure
2025	Ms. Marvel (Karla Sofen)	Alternate head, alternate hands and 2 energy effect pieces	Dark Avengers version Fan channel exclusive
2025	Daredevil	2 billy clubs, alternate hands and grappling rope	Daredevil: Born Again version
2025	Symbiote Spider-Man	Alternate unmasked head, symbiote effect piece and 4 alternate hands	Spider-Man 3 version Black Redeco and retool of the No Way Home Friendly Neighborhood Spider-Man figure with a new torso and unmasked head
2025	Punisher	Pistol, combat knife, axe and alternate hands	Daredevil: Born Again version
2025	Emperor Doom	Alternate hands and 2 spell effect pieces	One World Under Doom version Retool and redeco of the Super-Skrull wave Doctor Doom figure with a new cloak piece Fan channel exclusive
2026	Red She-Hulk	Alternate head, 4 alternate hands and 2 sai	Retool of the Gray She-Hulk figure with a new head, hands and upper torso
2026	Iron Man	Rose, alternate hands and 2 repulsor effect pieces	"I Love You 3000" version Pink redeco of the MCU MK III Iron Man figure with a heart-shaped arc reactor
2026	Iron Spider (Aaron Davis)	Mechanical legs, alternate unmasked head and alternate hands	Sinister Six version Black redeco and retool of the Beyond Amazing Iron Spider figure with a new torso and heads
2026	Spider-Man	2 web effect pieces and 4 alternate hands	Spider-Man: Brand New Day version Retool of the No Way Home Final Swing Spider-Man figure with a new torso
2026	The Punisher	Rifle, pistol, axe, knife, 2 grenades, gunfire effect piece and alternate hands	The Punisher: One Last Kill version
2026	Spider-Man	Present bag, Santa hat, miniature Iron Man action figure, 2 presents and alternate hands	Marvel Holiday Special version Retool of the Amazing Fantasy Spider-Man figure with a new Santa jacket piece and arms

=== Box sets ===
Release	Name	Figure	Accessories	Description
2022	Captain America Legacy	Captain America (Sam Wilson)	Alternate unmasked head, shield, backpack and alternate hands	The Falcon and the Winter Soldier version Repaint of the Captain America Build-a-Wing wave figure with a new unmasked head
2022	Captain America Legacy	Captain America (Steve Rogers)	Alternate unmasked head and shield	Avengers: Endgame version Repaint of the Walmart-exclusive Endgame Captain America
2022	Spider-Man: Homecoming (Fan channel exclusive)	Peter Parker	Backpack, notebook and alternate head and hands	Spider-Man: Homecoming version
2022	Spider-Man: Homecoming (Fan channel exclusive)	Ned Leeds	Backpack and alternate Spider-Man mask head	Spider-Man: Homecoming version
2023	Fantastic Four (Fan channel exclusive)	Franklin Richards and Turg	2 lab beakers, alternate hands and flight stand for Turg	Fresh Start version
2023	Fantastic Four (Fan channel exclusive)	Valeria Richards	Holographic tablet and alternate hands	Fresh Start version
2023	Squadron Supreme (Fan channel exclusive)	Hyperion	Alternate hands	Heroes Reborn version
2023	Squadron Supreme (Fan channel exclusive)	Doctor Spectrum	Power Prism, 2 energy effect pieces and alternate hands	Heroes Reborn version
2023	Squadron Supreme (Fan channel exclusive)	Nighthawk	3 Hawkarangs and alternate hands	Heroes Reborn version
2023	Squadron Supreme (Fan channel exclusive)	Blur	Alternate hands	Heroes Reborn version
2024	Fantastic Four (Fan channel exclusive)	Wolverine	Alternate hands	Empyre Fantastic Four uniform version Retool of the Tri-Sentinel wave Wolverine figure with a new belt and boots
2024	Fantastic Four (Fan channel exclusive)	Spider-Man	Alternate hands	Empyre Fantastic Four uniform version Repaint of the Amazing Fantasy Spider-Man figure
2024	S.H.I.E.L.D. (Fan channel exclusive)	Nick Fury Jr.	Rifle, pistol, 2 machine pistols, combat knife, 4 smoke effect pieces, 4 alternate hands, 2 gunfire effect pieces and alternate Nick Fury Sr. head	S.H.I.E.L.D. version
2024	S.H.I.E.L.D. (Fan channel exclusive)	Sharon Carter	Pistol, silenced pistol, 4 alternate hands, 2 gunfire effect pieces and alternate head	S.H.I.E.L.D. version
2024	S.H.I.E.L.D. (Fan channel exclusive)	Dum Dum Dugan	Rifle, 2 machine pistols, 2 gunfire effect pieces, combat knife, 2 smoke effect pieces and 4 alternate hands	S.H.I.E.L.D. version
2024	Punisher vs Bushwacker (Fan channel exclusive)	Punisher	Rifle, pistol, 2 submachine guns, grenade, alternate head and 4 alternate hands	The Punisher War Zone version
2024	Punisher vs Bushwacker (Fan channel exclusive)	Bushwacker	2 alternate gun hands and explosion effect piece	
2024	Outriders (Fan channel exclusive)	Outrider	Alternate interchangeable head	Avengers: Infinity War version
2024	Inhumans (Fan channel exclusive)	Crystal	Fire effect piece, water effect piece, alternate head and alternate hands	Classic version
2024	Inhumans (Fan channel exclusive)	Lockjaw	Alternate mouth, alternate hind legs and alternate tuning fork	Classic version
2025	X-Force	X-23	Alternate head and 4 alternate hands	X-Force version
2025	X-Force	Warpath	2 knives and alternate hands	X-Force version Retool and redeco of the Strong Guy wave Warpath with a new head and accessories
2025	Yelena Belova and Red Guardian	Yelena Belova	2 batons, pistol, knife and alternate hands	Thunderbolts version
2025	Yelena Belova and Red Guardian	Red Guardian	Alternate unmasked head, 2 pistols and alternate hands	Thunderbolts version
2025	U.S. Agent and Sentry	U.S. Agent	Shield and alternate hands	Thunderbolts version Retool and redeco of the Captain America wave U.S. Agent figure with a new head and shield
2025	U.S. Agent and Sentry	Sentry	Alternate hands	Thunderbolts version
2025	Medusa and Gorgon	Medusa	Alternate faceplate and hands	70s version
2025	Medusa and Gorgon	Gorgon	Mace and alternate hands	Inhumans version
2025	Black Bolt and Triton	Black Bolt	Alternate hands, 4 wings and 4 alternate hands	Inhumans version
2025	Black Bolt and Triton	Triton	Alternate head and hands	Inhumans version
2026	Ghost Rider	Ghost Rider (Johnny Blaze)	Flaming chain, alternate head and 3 alternate hands	Classic version
2026	Ghost Rider	Hell Cycle	5 attachable flame effect pieces and skull sissy bar	Red and orange redeco of the Ultimate Riders Hell Cycle toy with the skull fairing removed
2026	Astonishing X-Men	Kitty Pryde	Lockheed, alternate hands and alternate head	Astonishing X-Men version
2026	Astonishing X-Men	Colossus	Alternate head and hands	Astonishing X-Men version
2026	Avengers	Black Widow	Alternate head and hands	The Crossing version
2026	Avengers	Quicksilver	Alternate head and hands	The Crossing version
2026	Daredevil: Born Again	Daredevil	2 billy clubs, grappling rope, alternate head and alternate hands	Daredevil: Born Again black suit version Retool and black repaint of the previous Born Again Daredevil figure with a new head
2026	Daredevil: Born Again	Jessica Jones	Camera, alterate lense, coffee cup, alternate head and 3 alternate hands	Daredevil: Born Again version
2026	The Thing and Invisible Woman	The Thing	Alternate head and alternate hands	Future Foundation version Retool of the Walgreens exclusive Thing figure with a new torso and legs
2026	The Thing and Invisible Woman	Invisible Woman	2 bubbles, force field and alternate head	Future Foundation version
2026	Spider-Man and Mr. Fantastic	Mister Fantastic	2 alternate bendable elongated arms and 2 alternate hands	Future Foundation version
2026	Spider-Man and Mr. Fantastic	Spider-Man	4 alternate hands	Future Foundation version
2026	The Void and Valentina	The Void	Alternate hands	Thunderbolts* version Black redeco of the MCU Sentry figure with a new cape
2026	The Void and Valentina	Valentina Allegra de Fontaine	Pistol, alternate head and 3 alternate hands	Thunderbolts* version
2026	Astonishing X-Men	Cyclops	Optic blast effect piece and alternate hands	Astonishing X-Men version Reissue of the Ch'od wave Cyclops figure
2026	Astonishing X-Men	Wolverine	Alternate unmasked head and 4 alternate hands	Astonishing X-Men version Reissue of the Marvel 85th Anniversary Wolverine figure

=== The Infinity Saga ===
A special series of figures beginning in 2021, featuring characters from the Infinity Saga that had not been released in prior movie waves.

Release	Figure	Accessories	Description
Fall 2021	Thor	Mjolnir, Stormbreaker, alternate hands and 2 lightning effect pieces.	Avengers: Endgame final battle version
Fall 2021	Quicksilver	Alternate hands and 3 destroyed Ultron Sentry pieces	Avengers: Age of Ultron version
Fall 2021	Odin	Gungnir spear and alternate head and hands	Thor version
Fall 2021	Iron Man	Alternate unmasked head, alternate hands, wrist-mounted missiles and alternate wrist and hand attachments	Iron Man MK III Armor version
Fall 2021	Surtur	Twilight Sword and alternate hands	Thor: Ragnarok version
Fall 2021	Captain America	Alternate head, alternate hands, Wakandan shields	Avengers: Infinity War version Walmart exclusive
2023	Iron Man	2 repulsor effect pieces, alternate hands and unmasked head	Iron Man MK II Armor version Redeco of the MK III Iron Man figure
2023	Black Widow	2 pistols, 2 electric shock effect pieces, alternate hands and alternate The Avengers head	Captain America: The Winter Soldier version Redeco and retool of the Mandroid wave Black Widow figure with a new chest and pinless arms
2023	Bruce Banner	Alternate hands	Avengers: Infinity War version
2023	Spider-Man	Alternate hands and unmasked head	Captain America: Civil War version Repaint of the Vulture wave Spider-Man figure with a new unmasked head
2023	Captain America	Shield and alternate unmasked head	Captain America: The Winter Soldier version Retool of the Mandroid wave Captain America figure with 2 new heads
2023	Thor	Mjolnir and alternate head and hands	Thor: The Dark World version Repaint of the First Ten Years Thor figure with 2 new heads
2023	War Machine	2 stun batons, 2 mini-guns, 2 ammo packs and alternate hands	Captain America: Civil War version Repaint of the Target exclusive Civil War War Machine figure
2023	Iron Man	2 blast effect pieces, alternate hands and alternate unmasked head	Captain America: Civil War version Repaint of the Giant-Man wave Iron Man figure with a new unmasked head

==== Infinity Saga box sets ====
Release	Name	Figure	Accessories	Description
Fall 2021	Iron Man vs. Thanos	Iron Man	2 alternate heads, 4 alternate hands, energy shield, energy blade and 2 blast effect pieces	Avengers: Endgame MK LXXV version Retool of the Fat Thor wave Iron Man with a new unmasked head, a new Infinity Stones finger snap hand and new accessories
Fall 2021	Iron Man vs. Thanos	Thanos	3 alternate heads, alternate Power Gauntlet hand and double-bladed sword	Avengers: Endgame final battle version Retool of the 2019 BAF with a new dusted head, a new Power Gauntlet snap hand and new accessories
Fall 2021	Captain Marvel and Rescue (Amazon exclusive)	Captain Marvel	Power Gauntlet and 4 alternate hands	Avengers: Endgame version Exclusive
Fall 2021	Captain Marvel and Rescue (Amazon exclusive)	Rescue	Back-mounted repulsor blasters, 2 backpacks, 2 blast effect pieces and 2 alternate heads	Avengers: Endgame version Repaint of the Professor Hulk wave Rescue with a new unmasked head and accessories
Fall 2021	Iron Man 3 (Target exclusive)	Harold "Happy" Hogan	Smartphone	Iron Man 3 version Exclusive
Fall 2021	Iron Man 3 (Target exclusive)	Iron Man	2 blast effect pieces and alternate hands	Iron Man 3 MK XXI "Midas" Armor version Redeco of the Iron Man MK VII Armor figure Exclusive
Fall 2021	Iron Man	Obadiah Stane	Tony Stark's Arc reactor and briefcase	Iron Man version Exclusive
Fall 2021	Iron Man	Iron Monger	Alternate hands, wrist-mounted missile, ammunition, smoke effect piece, and blast effect piece	Iron Man version Exclusive

=== Black Panther Legacy Collection ===
Reissues of figures from the first Black Panther movie to coincide with the release of Black Panther: Wakanda Forever.

Release	Figure	Accessories	Description
2022	Black Panther	Alternate hands and unmasked head	Black Panther version Reissue of the M'Baku wave Black Panther figure
2022	Erik Killmonger	Sword, spear alternate hands and unmasked head	Black Panther version Reissue of the Target exclusive Erik Killmonger figure
2022	Shuri	Vibranium gauntlets	Black Panther version Reissue of the Professor Hulk wave Shuri figure
2022	M'Baku	Staff	Black Panther version Reissue of the 2018 BAF
2022	Nakia	2 ring blades	Black Panther version Reissue of the Okoye wave Nakia figure

=== Marvel Studios (2024-) ===
Rereleases of older figures from the Marvel Cinematic Universe.

Release	Figure	Accessories	Description
2024	Iron Man	Alternate hands and 4 repulsor effect pieces	Avengers: Endgame MK LXXXV Armor version Rerelease of the Warrior Thanos wave Iron Man figure
2024	Iron Spider	Alternate hands and 2 web effect pieces	Avengers: Infinity War version Rerelease of the Thanos wave Iron Spider figure
2024	Man-Thing	Alternate hands	Werewolf by Night version Heavy retool of the 2017 BAF with a new head, torso, forearms and ankles
2025	Captain America	Shield, alternate hands and alternate unmasked head	Avengers: Endgame version Rerelease of the Walmart-exclusive Endgame Captain America figure
2025	Spider-Man	Alternate hands	Spider-Man: Far From Home version Rerelease of the Molten Man wave Spider-Man figure
2026	Iron Man	2 repulsor effect pieces and alternate hands	Iron Man MK III Armor version Reissue of the previous Iron Man MK III figure
2026	Amazing Spider-Man	Alternate hands	Spider-Man: No Way Home version Rerelease of the Amazing Spider-Man figure from the Hasbro Pulse-exclusive box set

=== Deadpool Legacy Collection (2024) ===
Release	Figure	Accessories	Description
2024	Deadpool	2 katanas, 2 pistols, combat knife, uncorn and 6 alternate hands	Deadpool version Solo release of the Deadpool figure from the 2020 X-Men anniversary 2-pack
2024	Wolverine	Alternate head and hands	X-Men Origins: Wolverine version Rerelease of the Amazon-exclusive Wolverine figure with the heads from the jacketed retail version
2024	Colossus	Xavier Institute handbook, alternate head and hands	Deadpool 2 version

=== Deluxe ===
Release	Figure	Accessories	Description
2021	MODOK	Alternate face, hands and flame exhaust display base	
2021	Maestro	Alternate hands	Secret Wars version
2021	Kro	Alternate tentacle arms	Eternals version
2021	Hydra Stomper	Jetpack, alternate hands and 2 blast effect pieces	What If...? version
2021	Vulture	Removable wings, 5 exo-armor pieces and flight stand	Spider-Man: Homecoming version Retool of the 2017 BAF with a new head and accessories
2022	Defender Strange	Transportation portal and alternate hands	Doctor Strange in the Multiverse of Madness version Target exclusive
2022	Ragnarok	Hammer, spinning hammer effect piece and alternate head and hands	Civil War version Retool of the 80th Anniversary Thor with a new battle-damaged head and hands, and new accessories Target exclusive
2022	Rhino	Alternate head and hands	Retro version Retool of the 2015 BAF with new heads and hands Fan channel exclusive
2022	Ulik	Mace and alternate head and hands	Rerelease of the 2017 SDCC Ulik with a new head and new accessories Walmart exclusive
2022	Mojo	Alternate head and hands	80's Early Appearance Version; Repaint of the Pulse exclusive Mojo
2022	Ironheart	Alternate unmasked head, alternate cannon arm, alternate hands, 2 repulsor blast effect pieces, 2 smoke effect pieces, rear mounted thrusters and 2 exhaust effect pieces	Black Panther: Wakanda Forever version
2023	Ronan the Accuser	Universal Weapon	Classic version
2023	Groot	Baby Rocket, wings and alternate hands	Guardians of the Galaxy Vol. 3 version
2023	Cyborg Spider-Woman		Spider-Man: Across the Spider-Verse version
2023	Joe Fixit	Alternate head, Tommy gun and alternate hands	Retool and redeco of the Gamerverse Joe Fixit BAF with new heads and accessories Walmart exclusive
2023	Gladiator Hulk	Hammer, axe, alternate head, removable helmet and alternate hand	Thor: Ragnarok version Retool of the 2017 BAF with a new head
2023	Detroit Steel	Minigun, chainsaw and gunfire effect piece	Invincible Iron Man version Heavy retool and redeco of the MCU Iron Monger figure with a new head, hands, wings, accessories and patriotic color scheme PulseCon exclusive
2023	Green Goblin	Goblin Glider, alternate helmeted head, pumpkin bomb, hood, goggles and flight stand	Spider-Man: No Way Home version
2023	Doctor Octopus	4 bendable tentacles, 4 alternate claws and 2 alternate hands	Spider-Man: No Way Home version
2024	Angel	Articulated wings, alternate head and alternate hands	Classic version
2024	Captain America (Sam Wilson)	Shield, wings, backpack and alternate hands	Retool of the Toys "R" Us exclusive Sam Wilson Captain America figure with a new shield, backpack and wings
2024	Carnage	2 alternate blade hands, 3 bendable back tendrils and alternate head	Venom: Let There Be Carnage version
2024	Jean Grey	Alternate head, alternate hands, Phoenix Force effect piece and flame display base	Phoenix version
2024	Venompool	2 katanas, scabbard and alternate hands	Marvel Contest of Champions version Redeco of the 2020 BAF; Target exclusive
2024	Kang the Conqueror	Time Chair, blaster, energy effect piece, pistol, 3 alternate hands and 2 alternate Council of Cross-Time Kangs face plates	Hasbro Pulse exclusive
2025	Captain America (Sam Wilson)	Shield, articulated wings, alternate helmeted head, 2 backpacks, alternate hands and Redwing drone	Captain America: Brave New World version
2025	Falcon (Joaquin Torres)	Alternate head and hands, articulated wings, backpack and Redwing drone	Captain America: Brave New World version
2025	Red Hulk	Alternate head and hands	Captain America: Brave New World version
2025	Lizard	Articulated tail and alternate head and claws	Spider-Man: No Way Home version Heavy retool of the non-Legends 2012 The Amazing Spider-Man Lizard figure with new heads, hips and pinless limbs Amazon exclusive
2025	Electro	2 lightning effect pieces and alternate hands	Spider-Man: No Way Home version
2025	Kingpin	Cane, alternate head and alternate hands	Marvel's Spider-Man version Amazon exclusive
2025	Venom	Alternate head, symbiote tendrill, alternate hands and drool effect piece	Spider-Man 2 version
2025	Archangel	2 fletchette effect pieces, alternate hands and alternate head	Uncanny X-Force version
2025	Strong Guy	Barbell, 3 alternate hands and alternate head	X-Factor version Retool and repaint of the BAF with new heads and accessories
2026	Nimrod	Alternate head, 2 blast effect pieces, 2 energy spiral effect pieces and alternate hands	Classic version Retool and redeco of the Nimrod figure from the Amazon-exclusive X-Force box set with a new head
2026	Lizard	Alternate head	Torment version Retool of the Lizard BAF with two new headsculpts Amazon exclusive
2026	Deadpool	Dogpool, 2 alternate skeleton claw hands, skull mace, 2 bone nunchaku, 2 katanas, 2 pistols, knife and 4 alternate hands	Deadpool & Wolverine version Redeco of the previous MCU Deadpool figure with new accessories
2026	Abomination	Alternate Rick Jones head and alternate head	Immortal Hulk version Retool and redeco of the Avengers video game Abomination BAF with new heads
2026	Grizzly	Stolen loot bag, 2 gold piles and gold brick	Retool of the Ursa Major BAF with a new head
2026	Onslaught		Classic version Redeco of the 2016 Red Onslaught BAF with the Red Skull head replaced by the alternate helmeted Onslaught head from the later Juggernaut wave Kitty Pryde figure Target exclusive
2026	Archangel	Blaster, alternate folded wing pack, alternate head and alternate hands	X-Men '97 version Retool and redeco of the Uncanny X-Force Archangel figure with new heads, wings and accessories
2026	Exo-Armor Punisher	2 missile launch effect pieces, 2 smoke effect pieces, 2 gunfire effect pieces and alternate unmasked head	Thunderbolts version Heavy retool and black redeco of the Avengers: Age of Ultron Hulkbuster BAF with a new torso, heads, shoulder pads, guns and accessories Hasbro Pulse exclusive
2026	Professor Hulk	Blaster, removable glasses, 2 bunny slippers, alternate head and alternate hands	90s version
2026	Hulk	Removable shirt, 2 web effect pieces, alternate head and alternate hands	Spider-Man: Brand New Day version
2026	Hulk 2099	Alternate head	
2026	Green Goblin	Glider, flight stand, 2 pumpkin bombs, alternate unmasked head, alternate hands, explosion effect piece and shattered mask	Spider-Man: No Way Home 2002 costume version
2026	Doc Samson	Alternate head and hands	
2026	Beast	Tech pack, alternate head, goggles, wrist device and alternate hands	X-Men '97 version
2026	Mole Man	2 Moloids with 1 alternate head each, staff, 2 alternate heads and 2 display bases and alternate hands	
2027	Comeback	Web-line, alternate head and alternate hands	Web of Venom version

=== Maximum ===
Figures with additional accessories, articulation and paint deco work at a higher price point.

Release	Figure	Accessories	Description
2025	Spider-Man	Alternate unmasked head, 6 alternate hands, 2 alternate web-shooter hands, 2 alternate web-blasting hands, 2 web lines, web ball with display stand, web shield, web blast and Spider-Sense effect piece	Todd McFarlane Spider-Man version
2025	Hulk	Alternate Ed McGuinness head, alternate Mike Deodato Jr. head, breakable missile, exhaust flame effect piece, 2 gamma clap effect pieces, explosion effect piece and 4 alternate hands	Dale Keown version Retool of the 80th Anniversary Hulk with a new torso, heads, feet and accessories
2025	Deadpool	Doop with flight stand, alternate head, 2 katanas, 2 pistols, 3 rifles, combat knife, chimichanga, dynamite stick, 8 alternate hands and 3 gunfire effect pieces	Marvel NOW! version
2026	Thor	Throg, 2 Mjolnirs, alternate handle, 2 alternate heads, severed Frost Giant antler, 2 lightning effect pieces, 4 alternate hands and wired cape	Olivier Coipel version
2026	Symbiote Spider-Man	Alternate unmasked head, alternated Spidey-Sense head, sonic blaster, symbiote container, backpack, manhole cover, 2 web lines, 2 alternate web-shooting hands and 6 alternate hands	

=== Magic the Gathering Collection (2025-) ===
Figures that each come packaged with a Marvel-themed Magic the Gathering card.

Release	Figure	Accessories	Description
2025	Spider-Man	Alternate unmasked head, web shield, web line and 4 alternate hands	Battle-damaged version
2025	Agent Anti-Venom	4 tendrils, 4 guns and 2 alternate hands	White repaint of the Retro Agent Venom figure
2025	Iron Spider (Mary Jane Watson)	4 mechanical legs, alternate unmasked head and alternate hands	Stark Upgrade version
2025	Man-Wolf	Sword, bow, quiver and alternate hands	
2026	Black Panther	Vibranium spear, shield, Infinity Gauntlet, alternate half-mask head and 4 alternate hands	Secret Wars version Amazon exclusive
2026	Captain America	Shield, alternate unmasked head, glasses and alternate hands	Avengers: Twilight version
2026	Doom 2099	2 lightning effect pieces and 4 alternate hands	
2026	Malice	Alternate unmasked head and alternate hands	

=== Retro ===
Release	Wave	Figure	Accessories	Description
2021	Fantastic Four	The Thing	Alternate head	Negative Zone costume version Retool of the Walgreens exclusive Thing with new heads
2021	Fantastic Four	Mister Fantastic	Lab coat, alternate arms and alternate elongated hands	Negative Zone costume version Classic redeco of the Walgreens exclusive Mr. Fantastic with new accessories
2021	Fantastic Four	Invisible Woman	Force field effect piece and alternate hands	Negative Zone costume version Classic redeco of the Super-Skrull wave Invisible Woman with a new head
2021	Fantastic Four	Human Torch	Alternate flaming hands, flaming shoulder piece and 2 flame effect pieces	80s version
2021	Fantastic Four	High Evolutionary	Alternate hands	Annihilation: Conquest version
2021	Fantastic Four	Psycho-Man	Control-Box	Classic version
2022	Spider-Man wave 3	Armored Spider-Man	2 web splatter effect pieces and alternate hands	Marvel's Spider-Man version
2022	Spider-Man wave 3	Hobgoblin (Jason Macendale)	Goblin Glider, satchel and pumpkin bomb	Spider-Man: The Animated Series version Redeco and retool of the Space Venom wave Hobgoblin with a cartoon-inspired color palette and no chainmail on the limbs
2022	Spider-Man wave 3	Spider-Man (Ben Reilly)	4 alternate hands	Sensational Spider-Man version
2022	Spider-Man wave 3	Hammerhead	Maggia baseball bat and alternate hands	Classic version
2022	Spider-Man wave 3	Symbiote Spider-Man	4 alternate hands	Black redeco of the Wave 2 Retro Spider-Man
2022	Spider-Man wave 3	Shocker	Alternate hands and 2 energy effect pieces	Classic version
2023	X-Men wave 3	Wolverine	Alternate head and hands	Training uniform version Retool and redeco of the Juggernaut wave Wolverine with new limbs
2023	X-Men wave 3	Dark Phoenix	Alternate hands and flaming bird construct	The Dark Phoenix Saga version Retool of the exclusive Toys "R" Us 2-pack Dark Phoenix with new limbs and a new sash
2023	X-Men wave 3	Longshot	Knife, satchel, alternate hand and alternate knife-throwing hand	Classic version Redeco of the Hasbro Pulse exclusive Longshot
2023	X-Men wave 3	Multiple Man	Alternate head and hands	Classic version
2023	X-Men wave 3	Spiral	4 katanas, sword, axe and 2 alternate hands	Classic version
2023	X-Men wave 3	Avalanche	Alternate hands	Classic version
2023	Spider-Man wave 4	Spider-Man (Miles Morales)	Alternate hands	10 Year Anniversary suit version
2023	Spider-Man wave 4	Chasm	2 energy effect pieces	Dark Web version
2023	Spider-Man wave 4	Daredevil (Elektra Natchios)	2 sais and removable scarf	Devil's Reign version
2023	Spider-Man wave 4	Spider-Man (Ben Reilly)	Alternate hands	Beyond Corporation version
2023	Spider-Man wave 4	Rose	Rose, alternate hands and 2 automatic pistols	Classic version
2023	Spider-Man wave 4	Spider-Woman (Jessica Drew)	Alternate hands	King in Black version
2023	Spider-Man wave 4	Tarantula		Classic version
2024	Spider-Man wave 5	Scarlet Spider	4 alternate hands	Classic version
2024	Spider-Man wave 5	Spider-Man	Alternate hands	Last Stand version
2024	Spider-Man wave 5	Spider-Shot	2 gunfire effect pieces and 4 alternate hands	Spider-Verse version
2024	Spider-Man wave 5	Tombstone	Crowbar, alternate hands and alternate head	Classic version
2024	Spider-Man wave 5	Jack O'Lantern	Hovercraft, pumpkin bomb and alternate hands	Classic version
2024	Spider-Man wave 5	Hallow's Eve	2 masks, satchel and 4 alternate hands	Dark Web version
2024	Iron Man wave 1	Iron Man	2 repulsor effect pieces, 2 smoke effect pieces, alternate hands and alternate unmasked head	Model 1 Armor Avengers version Gold redeco and retool of the Avengers 60th Anniversary Model 1 Iron Man figure
2024	Iron Man wave 1	She-Hulk	Crushed gun and alternate hands	Classic version
2024	Iron Man wave 1	Iron Man	4 repulsor effect pieces and alternate hands	Pentagon Armor version
2024	Iron Man wave 1	Count Nefaria	Alternate hands	Classic version
2024	Iron Man wave 1	Iron Man	4 repulsor effect pieces and alternate hands	Neo-Classic Armor version Heavy retool of the 80th Anniversary Iron Man figure
2024	Iron Man wave 1	Whiplash	Whip and alternate hands	Classic version
2024	Secret Wars	Wolverine	Alternate unmasked head, alternate hands, lenticular shield and lenticular shield with alternate Secret Wars logo	Secret Wars version Retool of the Juggernaut wave Wolverine with new heads, pinless limbs and accessories
2024	Secret Wars	Beyonder	Miniature Battleworld, alternate hands and lenticular shield with alternate Secret Wars logo	Secret Wars II version
2024	Secret Wars	Iron Man (James Rhodes)	Blaster, roller skates, 3 alternate hands, 2 repulsor effect pieces, 2 smoke effect pieces and lenticular shield with alternate Secret Wars logo	Secret Wars Model 4 Armor version Retool of the 80th anniversary Iron Man with pinless limbs and new accessories
2024	Secret Wars	Symbiote Spider-Man	Alternate head, 4 alternate hands and lenticular shield with alternate Secret Wars logo	Secret Wars version Black redeco and retool of the First Appearance Spider-Man figure with new arms, heads and accessories
2024	Secret Wars	Captain America	Broken shield, alternate head, 4 alternate hands and lenticular shield with alternate Secret Wars logo	Secret Wars version Retool of the Marvel Legends 20th Anniversary Captain America figure with new pinless limbs, heads and accessories
2024	Secret Wars	Titania	Alternate hands and lenticular shield with alternate Secret Wars logo	Secret Wars version
2025	Spider-Man wave 6	Spider-Man	4 alternate hands	Spider-Man Unlimited version
2025	Spider-Man wave 6	Spider-Boy	Alternate head and hands	End of the Spider-Verse version
2025	Spider-Man wave 6	Electro (Francine Frye)	Alternate hands and 2 electricity effect pieces	Dead No More: The Clone Conspiracy version
2025	Spider-Man wave 6	Kaine	Alternate hands	Classic version
2025	Spider-Man wave 6	Agent Venom	Rifle, pistol, 4 alternate hands and alternate unmasked head	Spider-Island version
2025	Spider-Man wave 6	Chameleon	Rifle, pistol, alternate hands and J. Jonah Jameson mask	Spider-Man: The Animated Series version
2026	Spider-Man wave 7	Spider-Man (Kurt Wagner)	Sword, 3 alternate hands and BAMF effect piece	Uncanny Spider-Man version
2026	Spider-Man wave 7	Spider-Venom	Chain web-line, alternate unmasked head and 4 alternate hands	Venom War version
2026	Spider-Man wave 7	Spider-Man 2099	Web cape and 4 alternate hands	Classic version
2026	Spider-Man wave 7	Cardiac	Staff, alternate hands and 2 energy sphere effect pieces	
2026	Spider-Man wave 7	The Owl	Pet owl and alternate hands	
2026	Spider-Man wave 7	Hypno-Hustler	Guitar, 2 blast effect pieces, 2 smoke effect pieces and alternate hands	
2026	Secret Wars wave 2	Daredevil	2 connectible billy clubs, radar sense effect piece, alternate hands and lenticular shield	Classic version
2026	Secret Wars wave 2	The Falcon	Redwing, 2 alternate folded wings, alternate hands and lenticular shield	Classic version
2026	Secret Wars wave 2	Magik	Soulsword, flame effect piece, alternate hands and lengitcular shield	The New Mutants version
2026	Secret Wars wave 2	Spider-Man	Symbiote sphere, alternate hands and lenticular shield	Secret Wars costume change version
2026	Secret Wars wave 2	Constrictor	2 tendrils and lenticular shield	Secret Wars version
2026	Secret Wars wave 2	Absorbing Man	Wrecking ball, alternate hands and lenticular shield	Secret Wars version
2026	Spider-Man wave 8	Carnage	Alternate unmasked head, alternate scythe hand and 2 alternate hands	Maximum Carnage version Redeco of the Venom wave Carnage; Hasbro Pulse exclusive
2026	Spider-Man wave 8	Mary Jane Watson	Daily Bugle newspaper, rose and alternate hands	Spider-Man: The Animated Series version Solo release of the VHS 2-pack figure Hasbro Pulse exclusive
2026	Spider-Man wave 8	Aunt May	Fashion magazine, purse and alternate hands	Spider-Man: The Animated Series version Solo release of the VHS 2-pack figure Hasbro Pulse exclusive
2026	Spider-Man wave 8	Alistair Smythe	Alternate hands	Spider-Man: The Animated Series version Solo release of the VHS 2-pack figure Hasbro Pulse exclusive
2027	X-Men wave 4	Logan	Rifle, pistol, 2 gunfire effect pieces, backpack, visor and 4 alternate hands	Team X verison
2027	X-Men wave 4	Storm	2 lightning effect pieces alternate head and alternate hands	Onslaught version
2027	X-Men wave 4	Cyclops	Alternate head, 3 optic blast effect pieces and 3 alternate hands	Jim Lee version Retool and redeco of the X-Men '97 Season 1 Cyclops figure with new heads and accessories
2027	X-Men wave 4	Exodus	Alternate hands	Fatal Attractions version
2027	X-Men wave 4	Mesmero	Alternate hands	Classic version
2027	X-Men wave 4	Hepzibah	Blaster, alternate head and 4 alternate hands	Starjammers version

==== Retro single releases ====
Release	Figure	Accessories	Description
2021	Spider-Man 2099	4 alternate hands	Redeco of the Hobgoblin wave Spider-Man 2009 with new accessories
2021	Sandman	Alternate spike ball hand, alternate claw hand, 2 sand effect pieces and alternate battle-damaged head	Classic version
2021	Hercules	Mace, alternate head and alternate hands	80s version
2021	Tigra	Alternate head and hands	80s version
2022	Falcon	Wings and alternate hands	Steve Epting version Redeco of the Joe Fixit wave Falcon
2022	Loki	2 daggers and alternate head	Retool of the Professor Hulk wave Loki with a new head and accessories
2022	Lady Loki	Alternate hands	Repaint of the Lady Loki figure from the Toys "R" Us-exclusive A-Force box set
2022	Scarlet Witch	4 magic effect pieces	West Coast Avengers version Redeco of the Family Matters box set figure with a more classic-inspired color scheme
2022	White Vision	Alternate hands	West Coast Avengers version Redeco of the figure from the Target exclusive box set
2022	War Machine	Shoulder mounted minigun and missile launcher, missile effect piece, gunfire effect piece and alternate hands	Classic version Redeco of the deluxe War Machine figure with fewer accessories
2022	Firelord	Staff and alternate hands	Classic version
2022	Bombastic Bag-Man	"Kick me" sign and alternate hands	The Amazing Spider-Man #258 version
2022	Spider-Man	2 web effect pieces and 4 alternate hands	Spider-Man: The Animated Series version Cel-shaded redeco and retool of the Amazing Fantasy Spider-Man figure with a new head Walmart exclusive
2022	Lizard	Alternate head, 2 lab beakers, alternate hands and bendable tail	Classic version
2023	Beast	Alternate head and hands, glasses, 2 glass beakers and cloth goods labcoat	90s version Retool of the Caliban wave Beast figure with a new head and accessories
2023	Scorpion	Bendable tail	Spider-Man: The Animated Series version Retool of the Molten Man wave Scorpion figure
2023	Ghost Rider	Flaming chain, alternate flaming hands, 2 fire effect pieces and alternate mid-transformation head	Redeco of the Rhino wave Ghost Rider figure with a retro color scheme and new accessories
2023	Kraven the Hunter	Spear	Spider-Man: The Animated Series version Retool and of the Target exclusive Kraven's Last Hunt Kraven figure with new boots and a cartoon-inspired redeco Walmart exclusive
2024	Carnage	Alternate scythe hand, alternate axe hand and attachable symbiote tendril piece	Classic version Retool of the Venompool wave Carnage with a new head and accessories Target exclusive
2024	Prowler	Alternate hands and unmasked head	Spider-Man: The Animated Series version Retool of the Lizard wave Prowler figure with a new unmasked head, pinless limbs and a new cape Walmart exclusive
2024	Professor X	Alternate unmasked head and hands	Shi'ar Warlord version
2024	Quicksilver	Alternate hands	Classic green costume version Walmart exclusive
2025	Professor X	Cerebro helmet and 3 alternate hands	X-Men: The Animated Series Savage Land version Target exclusive
2025	Jean Grey	Psychic effect piece, alternate head and alternate hands	X-Factor version Target exclusive
2025	Wolverine	Alternate unmasked head, muzzle and 4 alternate hands	Weapon X version Retool of the Caliban wave Wolverine with a new head, pinless limbs and accessories Target exclusive
2025	Mystique	Rifle, pistol, alternate hands and Jean Grey head	Retool and redeco of the Walgreens-esclusive Mystique figure with new pinless limbs
2025	She-Hulk	Alternate head, 2 dumbbells and 4 alternate hands	Fantastic Four uniform version Retool and repaint of the Retro Iron Man wave She-Hulk figure with a new alternate head
2025	Storm	2 lighting effect hands and alternate hands	Outback costume Target exclusive
2025	Mysterio	Alternate unmasked head, alternate skull head, 2 smoke effect pieces and alternate hands	Spider-Man: The Animated Series version Walmart exclusive
2025	Iceman	2 ice beam effect pieces, ice base, lenticular shield and alternate head and hands	Secret Wars version Amazon exclusive
2026	Emma Frost	Alternate head, mutant research file, Danger Room manual and alternate hands	Diamond form version Translucent retool of the Ch'od wave Emma Frost figure with a new head and accessories Target exclusive
2026	Doctor Doom	2 blasters, 3 alternate hands and lenticular shield	Secret Wars version Redeco of the Secret Wars Doom figure from the Avengers 60th Anniversary two-pack with new accessories Walmart exclusive
2026	Cypher	Sword and 4 alternate hands	The New Mutants version Target exclusive

=== Mini-Comic waves ===
Figures that come with miniature comic covers.

Release	Wave	Figure	Accessories	Description	Comic cover
2025	Wave 1	Spider-Man (Miles Morales)	Alternate unmasked head and 3 alternate hands	Secret Wars version	Miles Morales: The Ultimate Spider-Man #1
2025	Wave 1	Ultimate Iron Man	4 alternate hands	The Ultimates version	Ultimate Iron Man #1
2025	Wave 1	Wolverine (Daken)	Alternate unmasked head and alternate hands	Dark Avengers version	Dark Avengers #1
2025	Wave 1	Adam Warlock	Infinity Gauntlet, staff and alternate hands	Infinity Watch version	The Infinity Gauntlet #1
2025	Wave 1	Banshee	Alternate screaming head and 3 alternate hands	Classic version	Giant-Size X-Men #1
2025	Wave 1	Rom the Space Knight	Neutralizer, Energy Analyzer, blast effect and 2 alternate hands	Classic version	Rom #1
2025	Wave 2	Daredevil	Billy club and 3 alternate hands	Daredevil: The Man Without Fear version	Daredevil: The Man Without Fear #1
2025	Wave 2	Black Widow	2 firing Widow's Bite bracelets, 2 smoking Widow's Bite braclets and alternate hands	90s version Repaint of the Super-Articulated Black Widow figure with a different head	Uncanny X-Men #268
2025	Wave 2	Beast	Alternate head and hands	Astonishing X-Men version	Astonishing X-Men Saga #1
2025	Wave 2	Silver Surfer	Surf board and 4 alternate hands	Classic version	Silver Surfer #1
2025	Wave 2	Phoenix (Rachel Summers)	Phoenix Force flame wings, alternate head and alternate hands	Excalibur version	Excalibur #1
2025	Wave 2	Feral	Alternate hands	X-Force version	X-Force #1
2026	Wave 3	Spider-Man (Doom Suit)	Alternate hands and 2 magic effect pieces	Doom suit version	Amazing Spider-Man #61
2026	Wave 3	Hawkeye	Alternate head, bow, arrow	Marvel NOW! version	Hawkeye #3
2026	Wave 3	Acroyear	Alternate hands, sword, sword effect piece	Classic version	Micronauts #12
2026	Wave 3	Elektra	Alternate hands and 2 sais	Classic version	Daredevil #181
2026	Wave 3	Captain America	Alternate hands, alternate head, shield	Earth-X version	Earth-X #1
2026	Wave 3	Elsa Bloodstone	Alternate hands, 2 rifles, revolver	Classic version Retool and redeco of the A-Force box set Elsa Bloodstone figure	Marvel Zombies #1

=== Marvel Legends 20th Anniversary ===
A special premium line dedicated to updating the characters featured in the very first wave of ToyBiz Marvel Legends from 2002, complete with retro-style packaging.

Release	Figure	Accessories	Description
2022	Captain America	Alternate unmasked head, empty mask, shield, 4 blast effect pieces, electricity effect piece, 4 alternate hands and display base with World War 2 backdrop	Classic version Retool of the 80th Anniversary Captain America with a new head and accessories, as well as a more classic color scheme Fan channel exclusive
2022	Iron Man	Alternate unmasked head, alternate hands, 2 blast effect pieces, 2 smoke effect pieces and display base with Stark Industries backdrop	Mark III "Horn Head" Armor version Retool of the 80th Anniversary Iron Man with a new head and torso, new accessories and a more classic-style color scheme Fan channel exclusive
2022	Hulk	Alternate head, alternate hands, destroyed ground display base, S.H.I.E.L.D. Mandroid head and cave backdrop	Late 70s/Early 80s version Fan channel exclusive
2022	Toad	2 toads, swamp backdrop, alternate hands and alternate head with extended tongue	90s version Fan channel exclusive

=== Beyond Amazing ===
A special Spider-Man-themed promotion designed to coincide with the character's 60th anniversary in 2022.

Release	Figure	Accessories	Description
2022	Iron Spider	Mechanical arms and alternate hands	Civil War version
2022	Spider-Man	Alternate hands and web line	Future Foundation stealth version
2022	Spider-Man	Underarm webs, 6 alternate hands, 4 web effect pieces and 2 web lines	Amazing Fantasy #15 first appearance version
2022	Spider-Man (Takuya Yamashiro)	Web line, 2 web effect pieces and alternate hands	Spider-Man version

==== Beyond Amazing box sets ====
Release	Name	Figure	Accessories	Description
2022	Silk vs. Dr. Octopus (Amazon exclusive)	Silk	Alternate unmasked head, face mask, alternate web-shooting hand and 4 alternate hands	Short hair version
2022	Silk vs. Dr. Octopus (Amazon exclusive)	Doctor Octopus	Tentacles and alternate head and hands	Rerelease of the SP//dr wave Doctor Octopus with a new head
2022	The King in Black	Knull	All-Black the Necrosword and alternate head	King in Black version
2022	The King in Black	Venom	Symbiote wings, alternate head and alternate hands	King in Black version Retool of the 2021 movie Venom figure with new heads, accessories and a comic-accurate redeco
2022	Renew Your Vows	Spider-Man	Alternate unmasked head and 4 alternate hands	Amazing Spider-Man: Renew Your Vows version
2022	Renew Your Vows	Spinneret	Alternate unmasked head and 4 alternate hands	Amazing Spider-Man: Renew Your Vows version

=== X-Men 60th Anniversary ===
A premium line celebrating the 60th anniversary of the X-Men franchise in 2023.

Release	Figure	Accessories	Description
2023	Rogue	Alternate hands	Outback version

==== X-Men 60th Anniversary deluxe figures ====
Release	Figure	Accessories	Description
2023	Blob	Alternate head and hands	Brotherhood of Evil Mutants version

==== X-Men 60th Anniversary box sets ====
Release	Name	Figure	Accessories	Description
2023	X-Men Villains (Fan channel exclusive)	Stryfe	Alternate hands	Retool of the Toys "R" Us exclusive Stryfe with a new head and pinless limbs
2023	X-Men Villains (Fan channel exclusive)	Pretty Boy	2 guns, 2 gunfire effect pieces, 2 smoke effect pieces and alternate hands	
2023	X-Men Villains (Fan channel exclusive)	Random		X-Factor version
2023	X-Men Villains (Fan channel exclusive)	Zero	Portal effect piece and alternate hands	X-Force version
2023	X-Men Villains (Fan channel exclusive)	Vertigo	Alternate hands	Marauders version
2023	X-Men	Storm	Alternate lightning effect hands and alternate hands	90s X-Uniform version
2023	X-Men	Jubilee	Removable sunglasses, alternate bubblegum-blowing head, 2 energy effect pieces and alternate hands	90s X-Uniform version
2023	X-Men	Forge	Energy rifle and alternate hands	90s X-Uniform version
2023	X-Men	Banshee	Alternate screaming head and hands	90s X-Uniform version
2023	X-Men	Gambit	Bo staff, satchel, alternate card-throwing hand, alternate card-gripping hand and playing card	90s X-Uniform version
2023	X-Men	Psylocke	Psychic knife, katana, psionic energy effect piece and alternate hands	90s X-Uniform version

=== Avengers: Beyond Earth's Mightiest ===
A premium line celebrating the 60th anniversary of the Avengers.

Release	Figure	Accessories	Description
2023	Iron Man	Alternate hands, 2 repulsor effect pieces and 2 smoke effect pieces	First appearance Model 1 Armor version
2023	Black Widow	2 alternate heads, 2 smoke effect bracelets, 2 blast effect bracelets, 2 gunfire effect pieces, 2 smoke effect pieces, 4 alternate hands, pistol and silencer pistol	Super-articulated version Target exclusive
2023	Captain America (Bucky Barnes)	Shield, pistol and alternate hands	Walmart exclusive

==== Beyond Earth's Mightiest deluxe figures ====
Release	Figure	Accessories	Description
2023	Super-Adaptoid	Hammer and shield	Retool and repaint of the 12-inch Marvel Legends Captain America figure with a new head, boots, gloves and accessories

==== Beyond Earth's Mightiest box sets ====
Release	Name	Figure	Accessories	Description
2023	Secret Wars	Captain Marvel (Monica Rambeau)	Alternate hands	Secret Wars version Exclusive
2023	Secret Wars	Doctor Doom	Alternate unmasked head, alternate hands, hood and mask	Secret Wars version Exclusive
2023	Thor vs. The Destroyer	Thor	Mjolnir, alternate hand and alternate Eric Masterson head	Walt Simonson version Retool of the 80th anniversary Thor figure with new heads and boots
2023	Thor vs. The Destroyer	Destroyer	Alternate hands	Exclusive
2023	Hawkeye & Sky-Cycle	Hawkeye	Bow, arrow, quiver and alternate hands	Classic version Exclusive
2023	Hawkeye & Sky-Cycle	Avengers Sky-Cycle	Display stand	
2023	The Incredible Hulk	Grey Hulk	Alternate head, torn shirt, crushed pipe and alternate hands	First appearance version Retool and repaint of the 80th Anniversary Hulk with a new head and torso
2023	The Incredible Hulk	Bruce Banner		Classic version Exclusive
2023	The Gatherers Saga (Amazon exclusive)	Sersi	2 energy effect pieces and alternate hands	The Gatherers Saga version Exclusive
2023	The Gatherers Saga (Amazon exclusive)	Black Knight	Photon sword and alternate hands	The Gatherers Saga version Retool of the Cull Obsidian wave Black Knight with a new head, arms, bomber jacket piece and accessories
2023	Secret Invasion	Queen Veranke	Alternate Spider-Woman head, web wings and alternate venom blast hands	Secret Invasion version Exclusive
2023	Secret Invasion	Illuminati Super-Skrull	Cloak of Levitation, alternate Iron Man suit arm and alternate elongated Mr. Fantastic arm	Secret Invasion version Exclusive
2024	Giant-Man and the Wasp	Giant-Man (Hank Pym)	Miniaturized Avengers Quinjet, lab coat, 2 lab beakers, tablet, alternate unmasked head and alternate hands	Classic version
2024	Giant-Man and the Wasp	Wasp	Alternate unmasked head, 4 attachable wings and alternate hands	Classic version

=== Wolverine 50th Anniversary (2024) ===
A series of box sets commemorating the first appearance of Wolverine.

Release	Name	Figure	Accessories	Description
2024	The Brood Saga	Wolverine	Alternate hands	Brood-infected version Retool of the Juggernaut wave Wolverine with a new head and arms
2024	The Brood Saga	Lilandra Neramani	Staff and alternate hands	Classic version
2024	Wolverine vs. Sabretooth	Logan	Alternate head, alternate hands and playing cards	Civilian cowboy gear version
2024	Wolverine vs. Sabretooth	Sabretooth	Alternate head and hands	90s version
2024	Acts of Vengeance	Wolverine	Alternate head and hands	Madripoor costume version Retool of the previous Madripoor Wolverine figure with new heads and pinless limbs
2024	Acts of Vengeance	Psylocke	Alternate head, alternate hands, Ten Rings effect piece and psychic knife effect piece	Lady Mandarin version
2024	Patch and Joe Fixit	Logan	Alternate head and hands	"Patch" disguise version
2024	Patch and Joe Fixit	Joe Fixit	Altermate head and hands	Retool and repaint of the deluxe Joe Fixit figure

=== Marvel 85th Anniversary (2024) ===
An anniversary line celebrating Marvel's publishing history.

Release	Figure	Accessories	Description
2024	Spider-Man (Otto Octavius)	2 backpacks, 4 attachable legs, alternate head and 4 alternate hands	Superior Spider-Man version
2024	Wolverine	4 alternate hands and alternate unmasked head	Astonishing X-Men version
2024	Warbird	Alternate hands, 2 energy effect pieces and alternate head	Target exclusive
2024	Skaar	2 swords, alternate head and alternate hands	Fan channel exclusive
2024	Venom	Alternate head and hands	Retro version Retool of the Amazon exclusive box set Venom with a new torso and head Walmart exclusive

==== Box sets ====
Release	Name	Figure	Accessories	Description
2024	Power Man and Iron Fist	Luke Cage	Alternate head and hands	New Avengers version
2024	Power Man and Iron Fist	Iron Fist	6 alternate hands, 2 energy effect pieces and alternate head	Power Man and Iron Fist version
2024	Ghost Rider	Ghost Rider (Danny Ketch)	Flaming chain and alternate hands	
2024	Ghost Rider	Hell Cycle	3 flame effect pieces	
2024	Hulkbuster	Hulkbuster Armor	Attachable chest piece, alternate hands and alternate unmasked head	Adi Granov version
2024	The Cabal	Iron Patriot (Norman Osborn)	Alternate unmasked head, alternate hands and 2 repulsor effect pieces	Dark Avengers version Heavy retool of the Puff Adder wave Extremis Iron Man figure with a new head, chest, legs and accessories
2024	The Cabal	Doctor Doom	Pistol, cloth cape, alternate Doombot head and alternate hands	Dark Reign version Redeco of the Super-Skrull wave Doctor Doom figure with a new cape and accessories
2024	The Cabal	Taskmaster	Sword, shield, bow, arrow, quiver, pistol and 3 alternate hands	Dark Reign version
2024	Odin	Odin	Gungnir spear, sword, Huginn and Muninn, alternate hands and 2 crowns	Classic version

=== Gamerverse (2025-) ===
A series of figures inspired by the Marvel vs. Capcom series, with each set including new accessories inspired by the special moves seen in the games.

==== Box sets ====
Release	Name	Figure	Accessories	Description
2025	Wolverine vs. Silver Samurai (Amazon exclusive)	Wolverine	2 Berserker Barrage effect pieces, flight stand and alternate hands	X-Men: Children of the Atom version
2025	Wolverine vs. Silver Samurai (Amazon exclusive)	Silver Samurai	Shuriken effect piece, flight stand, katana and lightning effect piece	X-Men: Children of the Atom version Retool and redeco of the Retro Silver Samurai figure with a new head, shoulder pads, skirt piece and accessories
2025	Psylocke vs. Thanos (Target exclusive)	Psylocke	Psychic knife, 2 Psi-Malestrom effect pieces, psychic butterfly effect piece, alternate head and 3 alternate hands	X-Men: Children of the Atom version
2025	Psylocke vs. Thanos (Target exclusive)	Thanos	Alternate hand	Marvel Super Heroes version Retool and redeco of the Infinity Gauntlet Thanos figure with a new head
2025	War Machine vs. Omega Red (Walmart exclusive)	War Machine	Shoulder Cannon, missile, blast effect piece and alternate hands	Marvel vs. Capcom: Clash of Super Heroes version Retool and redeco of the Retro War Machine figure with a new head, torso, cannon and accessories
2025	War Machine vs. Omega Red (Walmart exclusive)	Omega Red	4 Omega Strike tendril effect pieces and 2 alternate hands	X-Men: Children of the Atom version Retool and redeco of the Retro Omega Red figure with a new head and harness
2025	Captain America vs. Venom	Captain America	Shield, Charging Star effect piece, alternate hand and alternate head	Marvel Super Heroes version
2025	Captain America vs. Venom	Venom	Alternate hands and unmasked head	Marvel vs. Capcom: Clash of Super Heroes version Blue redeco and retool of the Amazon-exclusive box set Venom figure with a new head
2025	Shuma-Gorath / Gargantos		Mystic Smash effect piece, rotating eye, movable eyelids and bendable tentatcles	Marvel vs. Capcom 2: New Age of Heroes version Amazon exclusive
2025	The Juggernaut		Juggernaut Head Crush effect piece and alternate hands	X-Men: Children of the Atom version Amazon exclusive
2025	The Punisher (Amazon exclusive)	Punisher	Rifle, pistol, submachine gun, money briefcase, alternate head and 4 alternate hands	The Punisher version
2025	The Punisher (Amazon exclusive)	Nick Fury	Rifle, pistol, machine pistol, baseball bat, grenade, explosion effect piece and 4 alternate hands	The Punisher version
2026	Wolverine vs Psylocke	Bone Claw Wolverine	2 Berserker Barrage effect pieces, flight stand and 2 alternate bone claw hands and 2 alternate hands	Marvel vs. Capcom 2: New Age of Heroes Player 2 version Repaint of the previous Gamerverse Wolverine figure with new bone claw accessories
2026	Wolverine vs Psylocke	Psylocke	Psychic knife, 2 Psi-Malestrom effect pieces, psychic butterfly effect piece, alternate head and 3 alternate hands	Marvel vs. Capcom 2: New Age of Heroes Player 2 version Pink repaint of the previous Gamerverse Psylocke figure
2026	Iron Man vs Spiral	Iron Man	Energy shield, 2 repulsor effect pieces and 4 alternate hands	Marvel vs. Capcom 2: New Age of Heroes version
2026	Iron Man vs Spiral	Spiral	6 katanas and 6 alternate hands	Marvel vs. Capcom 2: New Age of Heroes version Retool of the Retro Spiral figure with a new head, belt and upper left arm
2026	Shuma-Gorath / Gargantos		Mystic Smash effect piece, rotating eye, movable eyelids and bendable tentatcles	Marvel Super Heroes version Purple-pink repaint of the previous Gamerverse Shuma-Gorath figure

==== Single releases ====
As part of an exclusive release with clothing brand Kith, the Gamerverse series was expanded to include a collaboration with Jada Toys' Street Fighter and Mega Man action figure lines.

Release	Figure	Accessories	Description
2025	Captain America	Shield, Charging Star effect piece, alternate hand and alternate head	Marvel vs. Capcom 2: New Age of Heroes Player 2 version Repaint of the Gamerverse Captain America figure
2025	Wolverine	2 Berserker Barrage effect pieces, flight stand and alternate hands	Marvel vs. Capcom 2: New Age of Heroes Player 2 version Repaint of the Gamerverse Wolverine figure
2025	Ryu	Hadouken effect piece, flight stand, alternate head and alternate hands	Marvel vs. Capcom 2: New Age of Heroes Player 2 version Repaint of Jada Toys' Ultra Street Fighter II Ryu figure
2025	Mega Man	Mega Buster, blast effect piece, flight stand, alternate head and alternate hands	Marvel vs. Capcom 2: New Age of Heroes Player 2 version Repaint of Jada Toys' Series 1 Mega Man figure

=== Marvel Rivals (2026) ===
Figures based on the Marvel Rivals video gasme.

==== Single releases ====
Release	Figure	Accessories	Description
2026	Moon Knight	Alternate glider cape, 2 crescent boomerangs and 2 truncheons	Marvel Rivals version
2026	Punisher	Pistol, rifle, 2 gunfire effect pieces, alternate head and alternate hands	Marvel Rivals version

==== Box sets ====
Release	Name	Figure	Accessories	Description
2026	Spider-Man and Luna Snow	Spider-Man	Alternate hands	Marvel Rivals version
2026	Spider-Man and Luna Snow	Luna Snow	Ice effect piece, alternate head and alternate hands	Marvel Rivals version
2026	Venom and Jeff	Venom	Alternate head and hands	Marvel Rivals version
2026	Venom and Jeff	Jeff the Land Shark	Alternate head and swimming effect piece	Marvel Rivals version

=== Amazon ===
Release	Figure	Accessories	Description
2022	Gorr the God Butcher	Alternate All-Black the Necrosword hand and alternate unhooded head	
2023	Erik Killmonger	Vibranium spear and alternate clawed hands	What If...? version Retool and redeco of the M'Baku wave Killmonger with a new head and accessories
2026	Spider-Man Noir	Grappling hook pistol, alternate head and 4 alternate hands	Repaint of the Into the Spider-Verse Spider-Man Noir figure with new accessories
2026	Scorpion	Alternate head and bendable tail	Classic version Retool of the Molen Man wave Scorpion figure with a new backpack and tail
2026	Magneto	Alternate hands	Avengers: Doomsday version

==== Box sets ====
Release	Name	Figure	Accessories	Description
2021	Wolverine	Wolverine	Alternate hands and alternate battle-damaged head	Shirtless version Retool of the Juggernaut wave Wolverine with a new head and redecoed bare torso
2021	Wolverine	Callisto	Butterfly knife, switchblade and alternate hands	Exclusive
2021	Wolverine	Mastermind	Alternate head	Hellfire Club version Exclusive
2021	Wolverine	Omega Red	4 attachable tendrils and alternate head	Classic version Redeco of the Sauron wave Omega Red with a new head
2021	Wolverine	Cyber		Exclusive
2022	Venom	Venom	Alternate unmasked head and alternate hands	Retool and redeco of the Spider-Man: The Animated Series Venom figure with new heads and accessories
2022	Venom	Riot	Alternate scythe hand	Venom: Separation Anxiety version
2022	Venom	Agony	Alternate hands	Venom: Separation Anxiety version
2022	Spider-Man	Ultimate Spider-Man	4 alternate hands	Symbiote costume version Purple redeco of the Space Knight Venom wave Ultimate Spider-Man figure
2022	Spider-Man	Silvermane	2 guns and alternate hands	Exclusive
2022	Spider-Man	Molten Man	Alternate hands and 3 flame effect pieces	Exclusive
2022	Spider-Man	Razorback		Exclusive
2022	Spider-Man	Human Fly	Alternate hands	Classic version Exclusive
2023	West Coast Avengers	Iron Man	Alternate hands and 2 blast effect pieces	Silver Centurion Armor version Redeco and retool of the Walgreens exclusive Silver Centurion Iron Man with new shoulder pads
2023	West Coast Avengers	Hank Pym	Alternate hands	West Coast Avengers version Exclusive
2023	West Coast Avengers	Mockingbird	2 batons, bo staff and alternate hands	West Coast Avengers version Exclusive
2023	West Coast Avengers	Spider-Woman (Julia Carpenter)	Alternate hands	West Coast Avengers version Exclusive
2023	West Coast Avengers	Tigra	Alternate head and hands	West Coast Avengers version Retool and redeco of the Retro Tigra with a new hairpiece
2024	Baron Zemo & Arnim Zola	Heinrich Zemo	Sword, pistol, 4 alternate hands and alternate unmasked head	Classic version
2024	Baron Zemo & Arnim Zola	Arnim Zola	Control rod and alternate eyestalk	Classic version Repaint of the BAF with a new Jack Kirby-inspired face graphic
2024	Rogue & Destiny	Rogue	Alternate hands	Brotherhood of Evil Mutants version
2024	Rogue & Destiny	Destiny	Alternate hands	Brotherhood of Evil Mutants version
2024	Doctor Strange & Wong	Doctor Strange	2 spellcasting effect hands and alternate Dormammu-possessed head	Modern version Redeco of the Walmart-exclusive Doctor Strange figure with a new cloak and accessories
2024	Doctor Strange & Wong	Wong	Bats, 4 alternate hands and 2 spellcasting effect hands	Classic version
2025	Marvel Super Villains	Madame Masque	2 pistols, 2 gunfire effect pieces, 2 smoke effect pieces, explosion effect piece, A.I.M. briefcase, money, alternate head and alternate hands	Marvel NOW! version
2025	Marvel Super Villains	Crossbones	Rifle, 2 pistols, combat knife and alternate hands	Modern version
2025	Invincible Iron Man	Iron Man	Alternate unmasked head, alternate hands and 2 repulsor effect pieces	Extremis Armor version Repaint of the Extremis Iron Man figure from the Puff Adder BAF wave with a new unmasked head
2025	Invincible Iron Man	The Mandarin	Alternate head, 4 alternate hands and 2 energy effect pieces	The Invincible Iron Man version
2025	Starfox and the Champion of the Universe	Starfox	Alternate hands	Classic version
2025	Starfox and the Champion of the Universe	Champion of the Universe	Alternate hands	Classic version
2025	Deathbird and Gladiator	Deathbird		90s version
2025	Deathbird and Gladiator	Gladiator	Alternate head and hands	Shi'ar Imperial Guard version
2026	Crossing	Scarlet Witch	Alternate hands and 3 hex effect pieces	The Crossing version
2026	Crossing	Vision	Alternate hands	The Crossing version
2027	Secret Wars	Superior Iron Man	Sunglasses, alternate unmasked head, 4 repulsor effect pieces and 2 smoke effect pieces	Time Runs Out version Silver repaint of the Zabu wave Superior Iron Man figure
2027	Secret Wars	The Maker	Alternate elongated neck, 2 alternate elongated hands and 2 alternate hands	Secret Wars version

=== GameStop ===
Release	Figure	Accessories	Description
Fall 2021	Spider-Man (Miles Morales)	Alternate venom blast hands, 2 venom blast effect pieces and 4 alternate hands	Spider-Man: Miles Morales camouflage version Translucent variant of the Armadillo wave Miles Morales

==== Box sets ====
Release	Name	Figure	Accessories	Description
Summer 2022	Marvel's Spider-Man	Mister Negative	Sword and 3 Darkforce effect pieces	Marvel's Spider-Man version
Summer 2022	Marvel's Spider-Man	Inner Demon	Assault rifle, pistol, 2 gunfire effect pieces, 2 smoke effect pieces, machete, baseball bat, alternate hands and 2 alternate heads	Marvel's Spider-Man version

=== Hasbro Pulse ===
Release	Figure	Accessories	Description
Fall 2021	Undead Hand Ninja	Ninjato, 2 kamas and alternate hands	Black redeco of the Stilt-Man wave Hand Ninja
2022	Invisible Woman	Force field effect piece and alternate hands	Invisible version Translucent variant of the Retro Invisible Woman
2022	Human Torch	Alternate flaming hands, flaming shoulder piece and 2 flame effect pieces	Negative Zone costume version Powered down variant of the Retro Human Torch
2022	Skrull Infiltrator	Blaster pistol and alien rifle	
2022	Wolverine	Alternate head, alternate hands, picture frame and retro VHS-style packaging	X-Men: The Animated Series version Cel-shaded redeco of the Apocalypse wave Wolverine with a new head, animated-style claws and accessories
2022	Jubilee	Alternate head, 2 pairs of sunglasses, 2 energy effect pieces and retro VHS-style packaging	X-Men: The Animated Series version Cel-shaded redeco of the Caliban wave Jubilee with a different head
2022	Mister Sinister		X-Men: The Animated Series version Cel-shaded redeco of the Wendigo wave Mr. Sinister
2022	Storm	Alternate lightning-shooting hands	X-Men: The Animated Series version Cel-shaded redeco of the Retro Storm with a newly retooled hairpiece
2022	Jean Grey	Alternate head and hands	X-Men: The Animated Series version Cel-shaded redeco of the Jean Grey figure from the Love Triangle box set
2022	Mystique	Baby Nightcrawler, rifle, pistol and alternate hands	X-Men: The Animated Series version Cel-shaded redeco and retool of the Walgreens-exclusive Mystique with a new head and accessories
2022	Morph	Alternate head and hands	X-Men: The Animated Series version
2023	Iron Man	Proton cannon, alternate unmasked head, alternate season 2 head, uni-beam effect piece, 4 alternate hands and 2 blast effect pieces	Iron Man: The Animated Series/Marvel Super Heroes version Retool and repaint of the Ursa Major wave Iron Man with a new head and accessories
2023	Cyclops	Alternate hands	X-Men: The Animated Series version

==== Box sets ====
Release	Name	Figure	Accessories	Description
2021	X-Force	Domino	Rifle, pistol and alternate hands Exclusive	Copycat impostor version
2021	X-Force	Cannonball	Alternate head, alternate detachable legs and flame display base	90s X-Force version Retool of the Wendigo wave Cannonball with a new head and legs
2021	X-Force	Rictor	Alternate hands and 2 energy effect pieces	90s X-Force version
2021	S.H.I.E.L.D.	S.H.I.E.L.D. Agent	3 alternate unmasked heads, 6 alternate hands, 2 pistols and 4 rifles	Red visor
2021	S.H.I.E.L.D.	S.H.I.E.L.D. Agent	3 alternate unmasked heads, 6 alternate hands, 2 pistols and 4 rifles	Gray visor
2021	Excalibur	Shadowcat and Lockheed	Alternate hands	Excalibur version
2021	Excalibur	Meggan	Alternate hands	Excalibur version
2021	Excalibur	Captain Britain	Sword of Might, alternate hands and alternate bearded head	New Avengers version
2022	Mojoworld	Mojo	Alternate head and hands	Exclusive
2022	Mojoworld	Longshot	Combat knife, alternate hands and alternate knife-throwing hand	Classic version Exclusive
2022	Mojoworld	Dazzler	Alternate hands and 2 energy effect pieces	Outback version
2022	Mojoworld	Wolvie		X-Babies version Exclusive
2022	Spider-Man and His Amazing Friends	Spider-Man	4 alternate hands	Spider-Man and His Amazing Friends version Redeco of the Amazing Fantasty Spider-Man figure
2022	Spider-Man and His Amazing Friends	Firestar	Ms. Lion, alternate hands, alternate head and 2 flame effect pieces	Spider-Man and His Amazing Friends version Redeco of the previously released Firestar figure
2022	Spider-Man and His Amazing Friends	Iceman	Alternate hands and ice effect base	Spider-Man and His Amazing Friends version Cel-shaded redeco of the Retro Iceman
2022	Heralds of Galactus	Terrax	Cosmic axe	Redeco of the 2012 BAF
2022	Heralds of Galactus	Fallen One	Alternate hands and 2 power cosmic effect pieces	
2023	Spider-Man: No Way Home	Friendly Neighborhood Spider-Man	Web line effect piece and 4 alternate hands	Spider-Man: No Way Home version
2023	Spider-Man: No Way Home	Amazing Spider-Man	Web line effect piece and 4 alternate hands	Spider-Man: No Way Home version
2023	Spider-Man: No Way Home	Integrated Suit Spider-Man	Web line effect piece and 4 alternate hands	Spider-Man: No Way Home version Repaint of the Armadillo wave Integrated Suit Spider-Man figure
2023	Daredevil	Daredevil	Billy clubs, grapple line and alternate hands	Classic version
2023	Daredevil	Elektra	Alternate head, 2 sais, katana and alternate hands	White costume version
2023	Daredevil	Bullseye	Alternate unmasked head, alternate knife-throwing hand and 3 alternate hands	Modern version Redeco of the Man-Thing wave Bullseye
2023	Spider-Man vs. Carnage	Spider-Man	4 alternate hands	Spider-Man: The Animated Series Symbiote suit version Cel-shaded redeco of the Renew Your Vows two-pack Spider-Man
2023	Spider-Man vs. Carnage	Carnage	Alternate axe hand and unmasked head	Spider-Man: The Animated Series version
2023	Doc Ock and Aunt May	Doctor Octopus	4 bendable, swappable tentacles	Spider-Man: The Animated Series version
2023	Doc Ock and Aunt May	May Parker	Alternate hands	Spider-Man: The Animated Series version
2023	Green Goblin and Mary Jane Watson	Green Goblin	Alternate unmasked head, pumpkin bomb and glider	Spider-Man: The Animated Series version Retool and redeco of the Retro Green Goblin with smooth limbs and 2 new heads
2023	Green Goblin and Mary Jane Watson	Mary Jane Watson		Spider-Man: The Animated Series version
2023	Guardians of the Galaxy	Drax the Destroyer	Alternate head and hands	Infinity Watch version
2023	Guardians of the Galaxy	Moondragon	Alternate hands	Guardians of the Galaxy version
2023	Peter Parker and Alistair Smythe	Peter Parker	Camera and alternate hands	Spider-Man: The Animated Series version
2023	Peter Parker and Alistair Smythe	Alistair Smythe	Alternate hands	Spider-Man: The Animated Series version
2023	S.H.I.E.L.D. vs. Hydra	S.H.I.E.L.D. Agent	Rifle, pistol, alternate hands and three shared unmasked heads	
2023	S.H.I.E.L.D. vs. Hydra	Hydra Trooper	Assault rifle, pistol, alternate hands and three shared unmasked heads	
2024	Daredevil and Hydro-Man	Daredevil	2 billy clubs, cable and alternate head	Spider-Man: The Animated Series version Cel-shaded redeco of the Hasbro Pulse-exclusive Daredevil with a new head
2024	Daredevil and Hydro-Man	Hydro-Man	2 water effect pieces	Spider-Man: The Animated Series version Translucent remold of the Molten Man wave Hydro-Man figure with a new head
2024	Doctor Strange and Morbius	Doctor Strange	2 spell effect pieces and alternate hands	Spider-Man: The Animated Series version Retool of the Walmart exclusive Doctor Strange
2024	Doctor Strange and Morbius	Morbius	Alternate hands	Spider-Man: The Animated Series version
2024	Sentinels		Rock, 4 alternate hands and 4 blast effect pieces	X-Men version
2024	Spider-Man and the Vulture	Spider-Man	4 alternate hands, alternate unmasked head, alternate Flash Thompson head and empty mask	Spider-Man: The Animated Series version
2024	Spider-Man and the Vulture	Vulture	Alternate hands and alternate elderly head	Spider-Man: The Animated Series version
2025	Wolverine and Storm	Wolverine	Alternate unmasked head and alternate hands	X-Men '97 brown costume version
2025	Wolverine and Storm	Storm	Alternate head, alternate electric hands and 2 lighting effect pieces	X-Men '97 black costume version
2025	Gambit and Rogue	Gambit	Basketball and 3 alternate hands	X-Men '97 basketball game version
2025	Gambit and Rogue	Rogue	Alternate hands	X-Men '97 basketball game version
2025	Cyclops and Jean Grey	Cyclops	Alternate head, optic blast piece and alternate hands	X-Men '97 final battle version
2025	Cyclops and Jean Grey	Jean Grey	Alternate head, alternate hands and 2 telekinetic effect pieces	X-Men '97 Marvel Girl costume version
2026	Sentinels		Rock, 4 alternate hands and 4 blast effect pieces	X-Men version Repaint of the previous Sentinel 2-pack figures
2026	Daredevil	Bullseye	Rifle, pistol, knife, machete, alternate head and 3 alternate hands	Modern version
2026	Daredevil	Muse	Spraypaint can, knife, baseball bat, hatchet and 4 alternate hands	
2026	Your Friendly Neighborhood Spider-Man	Spider-Man	Web-line, alternate unmasked head, glasses and 4 alternate hands	Your Friendly Neighborhood Spider-Man version
2026	Your Friendly Neighborhood Spider-Man	The Rhino	Alternate head, web effect piece and alternate hands	Your Friendly Neighborhood Spider-Man version
2027	X-Factor	Cyclops	Optic blast effect piece, alternate head, alternate unmasked head and alternate hands	X-Factor blue and white costume version Redeco of the Genocide wave X-Factor Cyclops figure with a new unmasked head
2027	X-Factor	Jean Grey	3 psychic effect pieces, alternate unmasked head and alternate hands	X-Factor red and yellow costume version
2027	Hellhunters	Ghost Rider (Sgt. Sal Romero)	Flaming chain, 2 rifles, 2 grenades, combat knife and 3 alternate hands	Spirits of Vengeance version
2027	Hellhunters	WW2 Hell Cycle	Holster, ammo crate and 4 flame effect pieces	Spirits of Vengeance version Redeco of the classic Ghost Rider Hell Cycle with new accessories

==== Made-to-order ====
Release	Figure	Accessories	Description	
2025	Dragon Man		Alternate hands, swappable wings, book and reading glasses	Future Foundation version
2025	Sentinel		2 blast effect pieces and alternate battle-damaged helmet, faceplate and reactor	X-Men '97 version
2026	Mephisto		Throne, 2 capes, sword, loincloth, alternate head and alternate hands	
2026	Apocalypse		Alternate head, alternate hands, alternate blade hand, alternate shield hand, alternate spiked mace hand, alternate drill hand, alternate cannon hand and 3 blast effect pieces	X-Men '97 version
2027	Sentinel		Alternate head, 4 alternate hands, rocket punch, blast effect piece, rocket thrusters and flight stand	Marvel vs. Capcom 2: New Age of Heroes version
2027	X-Men '97	Bastion	2 lightning effect pieces, alternate head and 4 alternate hands	X-Men '97 version
2027	X-Men '97	Bolivar Trask	Alternate Prime Sentinel head and hands	X-Men '97 version

=== Hasbro PulseCon ===
Release	Figure	Accessories	Description
Fall 2021	Venom	Alternate head	Spider-Man: The Animated Series version

==== Box sets ====
Release	Name	Figure	Accessories	Description
2021	M.O.D.O.K.: World Domination Tour	MODOK	Sunglasses, alternate hands 3 burgers with display stand and microphone.	Nextwave Elvis costume version Retool of the deluxe MODOK with new accessories
2021	M.O.D.O.K.: World Domination Tour	The Captain	Alternate head	Nextwave version

=== HasLab ===
Release	Project	Figure	Accessories/Features	Description
2021	Sentinel	Sentinel	3 alternate heads, 3 alternate faces, alternate hand, and 2x18 inch tentacle LEDs in head and chest	
2021	Sentinel	Bastion Sentinel Prime	Alternate Sentinel Prime head	
2021	Sentinel	Female Sentinel Prime		
2022	Galactus	Galactus	2 alternate faces and alternate Doctor Doom head LEDs in head and chest	
2022	Galactus	Nova (Frankie Raye)	Cosmic flame display base	
2022	Galactus	Silver Surfer	Surfboard, 2 energy effect pieces and power cosmic display base for Galactus to hold	Rerelease of the Walgreens Silver Surfer with a new head and accessories
2022	Galactus	Morg	Cosmic axe	
2024	Giant-Man (Hank Pym)		2 alternate faces and alternate Zombie head	Classic version

=== Marvel Unlimited Online ===
Free with the purchase of a new Marvel Unlimited Plus digital comics subscription at Marvel.com.

Year	Figure	Accessories	Description	Comic
2023	Kid Nova	Loki helmet pin and Skottie Young Rocket Racoon pin	New Warriors version Repaint of the Walgreens exclusive Nova figure	Captain Marvel: Dark Temple #1 and Loki #1
2024	Knight-Spider	2 crescent darts, Hellverine pin by Skottie Young, Deadpool and Wolverine meme lithograph by Annie Wu, and "Snikt!" patch	Edge of Spider-Verse version	Wolverine: Revenge #1
2025	Spider-Woman (Jessica Drew)	Fantastic Four pin, Fantastic Four lithograph by Ben Su and Fantastic Four mission patch	Peach Momoko black costume version Repainted X-Factor Polaris head on the Shriek body	One World Under Doom #6
2026	Phoenix	2 mystery items and alternate hands	Black and white costume version Repaint of the Retro Dark Phoenix figure	

=== New York Comic-Con ===
Year	Figure	Accessories	Description
2025	Super-Skrull	Alternate elongated arm, alternate rock arm, alternate hands, flame effect piece and 2 alternate heads	Flame-On version Retool and recast of the BAF with a new head and translucent orange legs

=== San Diego Comic-Con ===
Year	Figure	Accessories	Description
2024	Death's Head	Axe, shield, mace, spear and alternate hands	Classic version
2026	Professor X	Hover chair, display base, 2 blast effect pieces, 2 alternate panels, Cerebro helmet, alternate head and 3 alternate hands	X-Men '97 version

=== Box sets ===
Release	Set	Figure	Accessories/Features	Description
2023	Deadpool	Deadpool	2 katanas, 2 pistols, 2 sais, boxing glove bazooka, photon sword, 2 pairs of nunchaku, 8 alternate hands and alternate unmasked head	
2023	Deadpool	Bob, Agent of Hydra	2 guns, photon sword, alternate hands and Hydra briefcase	
2025	Savage Land	Rogue	Spear, knife and 4 alternate hands	Marvel Snap Savage Land version
2025	Savage Land	Shanna the She-Devil	Spear, rifle, knife and 4 alternate hands	Marvel Snap Savage Land version
2025	Savage Land	Sauron	Hypnosis effect piece	Marvel Snap Savage Land version Redeco of the 2018 BAF with new accessories
2026	Spider-Man '67	Spider-Man	Alternate unmasked head, camera, mask, web line, 2 web effect pieces and 7 alternate hands	Spider-Man version
2026	Spider-Man '67	The Lizard	2 beakers, grenade, alternate head, alternate hands and bendable tail	Spider-Man version Retool of the Retro Lizard figure with new heads
2026	Spider-Man '67	Electro	Alternate lightnning-shooting hand, 2 electricity effect pieces, alternate head and alternate hands	Spider-Man version

=== Target ===
Release	Figure	Accessories	Description
Spring 2021	Mobius M. Mobius	TemPad and Time Stick	Loki version
Fall 2021	Thena	Spear, 3 swords and alternate hands	Eternals version
Fall 2021	Captain Carter	Stealth shield	What If...? Stealth suit version Repaint of The Watcher wave Captain Carter
2022	Spider-Man Noir	Spider-Ham, pistol and alternate hatless head	Spider-Man: Into the Spider-Verse version
2023	Yondu	Bow, arrow and attachable quiver	Classic version
2023	Kazi	Golf club, machete, Molotov cocktail, baseball bat, crowbar and 2 alternate Tracksuit Mafia heads	Hawkeye version
2023	Ant-Man (Scott Lang)	Alternate hands	Classic version
2023	Scarlet Witch	Darkhold and 2 spell effect pieces	Doctor Strange in the Multiverse of Madness version Retool of the Captain America wave Scarlet Witch figure with a new head, arms and accessories
2023	Spider-Man	Web line, 4 underarm webs and 6 alternate hands	Amazing Fantasy #15 first appearance version Reissue of the Beyond Amazing first appearance Spider-Man figure
2023	Moon Knight	Bo staff, 5 crescent darts and alternate head and hands	Classic version Reissue of the Walgreens exclusive Moon Knight
2024	Venom	Symbiote tendrils and alternate head and hands	Venom: Let There Be Carnage version Redeco of the Venompool wave Venom figure with new accessories
2025	Spider-Man	2 web effect pieces and alternate hands	Marvel's Spider-Man Velocity Suit version Redeco of the Demogoblin wave Velocity Suit Spider-Man figure
2025	Spider-Man	4 alternate hands	Hellfire Gala version
2026	Shirtless Wolverine	Alternate head and 4 alternate hands	Deadpool & Wolverine version Retool of the battle-damaged Wolverine figure with a new bare torso
2026	Final Swing Spider-Man	Half-unmasked head and alternate hands	Spider-Man: No Way Home version Reissue of the previous Final Swing Spider-Man figure with a new head accessory

=== Box sets ===
Release	Set	Figure	Accessories/Features	Description
2023	Venom: Space Knight	Venom (Flash Thompson)	Alternate head and two symbiote blade pieces	Venom: Space Knight version Reissue of the 2016 BAF with a new head and accessories
2023	Venom: Space Knight	Mania		

=== Walgreens ===
Release	Figure	Accessories	Description
Summer 2021	Quasar	Alternate hands and 2 energy effect pieces	90s version
Fall 2021	Binary	Alternate hands and 4 cosmic energy effect pieces	Starjammers version
2022	Helmut Zemo	Sword and alternate hands	Masters of Evil version
2022	Jigsaw	Baseball bat, machete, shotgun, 2 knives, 2 gunfire effect pieces and 2 smoke effect pieces	Classic version
2022	Sentry	Alternate Void head	New Avengers version
2022	Moonstone	Alternate hands	Thunderbolts version Retool of the 2013 San Diego Comic-Con exclusive Moonstone with new arms and a newly printed face

=== Walmart ===
Release	Figure	Accessories	Description
Summer 2021	Compound Hulk	Alternate hands	Redeco of the deluxe Red Hulk
Fall 2021	Ajak	Alternate unhelmeted head and alternate hands	Eternals version
Fall 2021	Spider-Man	Alternate hands, web-line and alternate unmasked head	Spider-Man: No Way Home Upgraded Suit version Retool of the Molten Man wave Spider-Man with a new torso, unasked head and accessories
2022	Doctor Strange	Alternate masked head, alternate meditating head, alternate hands, Wand of Watoomb, Axe of Angarruumus and 2 magic effect pieces	Classic version
2023	Star-Lord	Element Gun, sword and alternate hands	Classic version
2023	Ronin (Clint Barton)	2 katanas, bow, removable hood and alternate unmasked head	Hawkeye flashback version Retool of the Armored Thanos wave Ronin figure with a new head and accessories
2024	Hydra Captain America	Shield and alternate hands	Secret Empire version Retool of the Puff Adder wave Ultimate Captain America figure with a new torso and arms
2025	Spider-Man	Web-line, alternate hands and 2 web effect pieces	The Amazing Spider-Man version
2025	Spirit Spider	4 alternate hands	Spider-Man 2 version
2026	Boomerang	2 boomerangs, alternate head and alternate hands	Sinister Syndicate version
2026	Mister Fantastic	H.E.R.B.I.E., alternate head and alternate hands	Avengers: Doomsday version Retool of the Fantastic Four: First Steps Mister Fantastic Four figure with new heads, arms, jacket piece and accessories
2026	The Thing	Alternate bearded head and alternate hands	Avengers: Doomsday version Reool of the Fantastic Four: First Steps Thing figure with a new torso, heads, feet and arms
2027	God Emperor Doom	Sword, alternate unmasked head, 2 magic effect pieces and alternate hands	Secret Wars version Retool of the Xemnu wave God Emperor Doom figure with a new head, hood, arms and fabric cape

=== Box sets ===
Set	Release	Figure	Accessories/Features	Description
2023	The Six Arms Saga	Spider-Man	Alternate hands	Six arms version Retool of the Kingpin wave Spider-Man figure with added torso articulation
2023	The Six Arms Saga	Morbius	Attachable cape	Classic version Reissue of the Absorbing Man wave Morbius figure
2026	Avengers: Doomsday	Invisible Woman	Force field effect piece and alternate hands	Avengers: Doomsday version Retool of the Fantastic Four: First Steps Invisible Woman figure with a new head, arms and jacket piece
2026	Avengers: Doomsday	Human Torch	4 flame effect pieces and alternate hands	Avengers: Doomsday version Retool of the Fantastic Four: First Steps Human Torch figure with a new head, arms and jacket piece

== See also ==
- DC Multiverse (toy line)
- DC Universe Classics
- Hulk Classics
- Iron Man: The Armored Avenger
- Spider-Man Classics
- X-Men Classics (action figure)
