= Hulk Classics =

Action figure line

- Type: Action figures
- Invented by: Marvel Comics
- Company: Toy Biz
- Country: United States
- Availability: 2003–2003
- Materials: Plastic
- Features: Hulk

Hulk Classics was an action figure line based on the characters of Marvel Comics, and produced by Toy Biz in 2003. The line revolves around the Hulk and his supporting cast from the comic book series.

== Series ==
=== Series One ===
- Abomination
- Joe Fixit
- Smart Hulk
- Super Poseable Savage Hulk

=== Series Two ===
- Absorbing Man
- Gamma Punch Hulk (with Bruce Banner)
- Mecha Hulk (with Gremlin)
- War Hulk

== See also ==
- Marvel Legends
