= List of Thor (Marvel Comics) enemies =

This is a list of Thor's enemies.

== A ==
- Absorbing Man – Carl 'Crusher' Creel was given the power to take the form of any material he touched, "absorbing" the property of the material itself. The Absorbing Man was given his powers by Loki in a plot to defeat Thor.
- Apocalypse – A powerful mutant who convinced people that he was a deity.
- Ares – The son of Zeus and Hera, he was worshiped as the god of war in ancient Greece and Rome. Ares' dissatisfaction with Zeus' rule of Olympus began after Zeus' decree that worship of the Olympians should be allowed to die out.
- Arkin – Also known as Arkin the Weak. When he heard of Thor's banishment, he rushed to tell Queen Knorda of the mountain giants, in hopes of winning her love, though this was a ruse created by both Thor and Odin to weed out a traitor in the Asgardian court.
- Atum – Also known as Demogorge the God Eater, a being created to consume the gods.

== B ==
- Black Winter – A multiversal cosmic entity that consumes entire universes and had used Galactus as his herald.
- Blackheart – The demon son of Mephisto.
- Bloodaxe – A woman named Jackie Lucas who found the axe once wielded by Skurge the Executioner, and, picking up the axe, was transformed by its magic into a superhuman being. She was primarily an enemy of Thunderstrike.

== C ==
- Crusader – A seminary student in Chicago, Illinois who believed that the Roman Catholic Church should become more active in fighting paganism and godlessness in modern society.
- Carbon-Copy Men – Shapeshifting aliens who tried to take over the world by impersonating people and causing chaos. They were defeated by Thor and their leader was hurled into space by him, where he died.

== D ==
- Dario Agger – Dario Agger is the CEO of Roxxon Energy Corporation and possesses the ability to transform into a Minotaur.
- Desak – The God-Slayer of an unnamed world, where the inhabitants worship a god called Kronnitt.
- Destroyer – An enchanted suit of armor forged by Odin. To be activated, the spirit of another must enter it, which leaves their body inanimate.
- Doctor Doom – The Fantastic Four's deadliest enemy. He is the ruler of Latveria.
- Dormammu – The ruler of the Dark Dimension. He is the archenemy of Doctor Strange.
- Durok the Demolisher – A creature created by Karnilla at the behest of Loki to defeat Thor. Durok was killed by Thor.

== E ==
- Ego the Living Planet – In the so-called "Black Galaxy", a portion of space unknown to Earth, Ego came into being as any planet would, from coalescing cosmic gases and dust. However, Ego evolved consciousness and intelligence as well. He can control his body and even create organisms from it.
- Enchanters Three – Brothers who hail from the realm of Ringsfjord, which exists on the extra-dimensional continent of Asgard.
- Enchantress – Asgardian called Amora (based on the Latin word for love) who began learning magic as an apprentice of Karnilla the Norn Queen, but was eventually banished. She continued learning magic on her own, notably by seducing others well-versed in magic and learning their secrets. She is among the best Asgardian spellcasters.
- Executioner – Skurge, the son of an Asgardian goddess and a Storm Giant who fell in love with Amora. He is one of the strongest and greatest warriors in Asgard. However, he later died on a mission to the Underworld by sacrificing himself to save Thor.

== F ==
- Fafnir – Once the King of Nastrond, a land on the other-dimensional continent of Asgard.
- Fenris Wolf – A child of the trickster Loki and the giantess Angrboda. A mystical wolf of the Asgardian dimension of Niffelheim.

== G ==
- Galactus – Only survivor of the universe before the Big Bang. The Devourer of Worlds.
- Geirrodur – Geirrodur is the king of the trolls that live beneath Asgard. Geirrodur carries a spear called Tordenstok. It is made of uru, a metal found only in the realm of the trolls, and has certain mystical properties, as well as being virtually unbreakable. Geirrodur has enslaved Orikal on more than one occasion.
- Gorr the God Butcher – An alien whose bitterness at the lack of godly intervention and discovery of the powerful Necrosword causes him to go on a quest to destroy every god in the Marvel Universe.
- Grey Gargoyle – A French chemist and lab assistant who gained his powers, including turning people to stone for an hour with a touch, by accidentally spilling an unknown concoction on himself, also giving himself a stone-like form, though he can still move.
- Grog – The God-Slayer, a member of the Heliopolitan race of gods.
- Growing Man – An android created by the Kosmosians, an alien race enslaved by Kang the Conqueror, the ruler of an alternate future Earth.
- Grundroth – Grundroth is the leader of the Frost Giants. He took over the now-human-sized Giants after their previous leader, Skrymir, was defeated by Balder the Brave. Loki convinced Grundroth that he could aid them by kidnapping Iceman and using him to return the Giants to their proper height.

== H ==
- Hela – A child of the trickster god Loki and the giantess Angrboda. The Asgardian goddess of death and ruler of Hel and Niflheim, two of the Nine Realms.
- High Evolutionary – A scientist who seeks to evolve animals.
- Harokin – An Asgardian who was used by Hela to against Thor.

== J ==
- Juggernaut – Army soldier exposed to the Crimson Gem of Cyttorak. Stepbrother of Professor X.

== K ==
- Karnilla – The Norn Queen is a sorceress and the queen of Nornheim (one of the Asgardian provinces).
- King Cobra – A snake-themed supervillain. He is the original member of Serpent Squad. He worked alongside Mister Hyde against Captain America and other heroes.
- Kryllk the Cruel – An Asgardian Troll leader who fought Spider-Man and Thor.
- Kurse – The most powerful of the Dark Elves, who was known as Algrim the Strong. He is coerced by the Dark Elf Malekith the Accursed.
- Knorda – Though human-sized, Knorda is an Asgardian queen of the Mountain Giants and possesses superhuman strength and durability, as well as being highly resistant to cold, aging and conventional disease.

== L ==
- Laufey – The ruler of the Frost Giants of Jotunheim, one of the Nine Worlds of Asgardian cosmology and Loki's biological father.
- Loki – Thor's archenemy and adoptive brother. The son of Laufey, ruler of the Frost Giants of Jotunheim, one of the "Nine Worlds" of the Asgardian cosmology. He is a master of spellcasting and trickery.
- Lorelei – The sister of Amora the Enchantress, who possesses some skills in Asgardian magic and seduction.
- Locus – A man named Aaron Verne with the ability to mentally create force fields in the shape of geometric objects.

== M ==
- Malekith the Accursed – The ruler of the Dark Elves of Svartalfheim, one of the Nine Worlds of Asgardian cosmology.
- Man-Beast – The Man-Beast was once an ordinary red wolf that is captured and mutated by the High Evolutionary – a being intent on creating an army of New Men from animals.
- Mangog – He is the sum total of the hatred of a billion beings that were once killed by the ruler of Asgard. Imprisoned deep beneath Asgard, Mangog is accidentally freed by the Rock Troll Ulik, and seeks to destroy Asgard.
- Marduk – Marduk is the god of wisdom and the sun in Sumerian mythology. He attacked the Asgardians seeking to take their power for his own, but was defeated by Thor.
- Megatak – An industrial spy. He was inside an experimental video display when he gained his powers.
- Mephisto – A demon-lord who rules a Hell dimension and has clashed with Thor on different occasions.
- Mercurio the 4-D Man – Alien with the ability to generate flames from the right hand and extreme cold from the left.
- Midgard Serpent – A monstrous snake large enough to coil around the Earth whom Thor is destined to battle during Ragnarök.
- Mister Hyde – Amoral doctor turned rampaging strong man when he takes a potion he invented and former partner of the King Cobra.
- Mongoose – Mongoose is an ordinary mongoose who was mutated into a humanoid form by the High Evolutionary to serve as his agent.

== N ==
- Nobilus – A clone of Thor created by the High Evolutionary from Thor's DNA samples.

== P ==
- Pluto – The Roman god of the Underworld and the dead.
- Perrikus – Member of a race known as the Dark Gods.

== Q ==
- Quicksand – Once a scientist working at a nuclear facility. An accident transforms her body into a sand-like substance.

== R ==
- Radioactive Man – A Chinese physicist who can manipulate radiation due to deliberate exposure to it after the Chinese government tried to create a super-being.
- Ragnarok – An cyborg clone of Thor with the same powers and abilities as Thor.

== S ==
- Sandu – A circus performer with limited extrasensory powers which were enhanced by Loki.
- Seth – Egyptian god of evil.
- Shatterfist – user of the 'Power Gloves', member of the Masters of Evil.
- Stellaris – A warrior who fought Thor while she sought vengeance against the Celestials.
- Sindr – Queen of Cinders and Daughter of Surtur, Sindr spreads her purging flames across the ten Realms.
- Surtur – A Fire Demon of Muspellheim, one of the Nine Worlds of Asgardian cosmology, and ruler of the Fire Demons, with power rivaling that of Odin.

== T ==
- Thanos – A Mad Titan
- Thermal Man – A Chinese humanoid capable of energy projection.
- Titania – A supervillainess who is married to the Absorbing Man and was given superhuman strength by Doctor Doom.

== U ==
- Ulik – The strongest and fiercest of the Rock Trolls, born millennia ago in Asgard.
- Utgard-Loki - The monarch of the Frost Giants of Jotunheim.

== V ==
- Venom – The most prominent member of the symbiote race, Malekith used the symbiote against Thor in emulation to Gorr and Knull.

== W ==
- Wrecking Crew – Four supervillains whose flesh and weapons were toughened by Asgardian magic.

== Y ==
- Ymir – A Frost Giant who formed at the beginning of creation in a place called Niffleheim.

== Z ==
- Zarrko – An evil scientist from the future, who built a time machine to escape from his peaceful 23rd century and visit more primitive periods, hoping to become a ruler.
