= The Evolutionary War =

Comic book crossover

- Cover of X-Factor Annual 3 (1988), art by Walt Simonson
- Publisher: Marvel Comics
- Publication date: 1988
- Genre: Superhero; Crossover
Title(s)
The Amazing Spider-Man Annual #22
Avengers Annual #17
Fantastic Four Annual #21
The New Mutants Annual #4
The Punisher Annual #1
Silver Surfer Annual #1
The Spectacular Spider-Man Annual #8
Web of Spider-Man Annual #4
West Coast Avengers Annual #3
X-Factor Annual #3
X-Men Annual vol. 1, #12
- Main character(s): The Avengers; Avengers West Coast; Fantastic Four; X-Men; X-Factor; Punisher; Silver Surfer; New Mutants; High Evolutionary; Kingpin

"The Evolutionary War" was a comic book crossover which ran through most of the 1988 annuals published by Marvel Comics. The principal writers included Gerry Conway, Steve Englehart, Louise Simonson, Chris Claremont, and Steve Gerber.

The storyline was the first of its kind. While there had been previous extended crossovers over multiple titles before it, "The Evolutionary War" was the first to take place exclusively in annuals. This format of crossover annuals was to be repeated by Marvel for the next four years, most notably with 1989's "Atlantis Attacks."

== Background ==
One of the world's premiere geneticists, the High Evolutionary had devoted his life to unlocking the mysteries of life and creating new forms of intelligent beings for his research. His crowning achievement was the creation of Counter-Earth; however, this was viewed as little more than a trivial matter by the Beyonders, who captured the planet for display in a cosmic museum of curiosities. Realizing that his own aspirations to godhood were dwarfed by the Beyonders, the Evolutionary succumbed to madness and depression. He goaded the Hulk into damaging the defense mechanisms in his armor, so that he could commit suicide.

== Plot ==
The High Evolutionary is revealed to have survived his suicide attempt, and has rededicated himself to guiding and enhancing the evolution of humanity so that his race may one day be supreme to all others, including the Beyonders. To this end he initiates several concurrent efforts to accelerate human evolution and eliminate perceived threats to mankind's genetic purity.

He sends his Purifier troops into Subterranea to sterilize the simple-minded races that dwell there. However, the discovery of a mutant Moloid attracts the intervention of X-Factor and Apocalypse. Apocalypse and the High Evolutionary engage in an epic battle in outer space. The Evolutionary is ultimately convinced that the Subterraneans indeed have genetic potential and ceases his operations there.

In Bogotá, the Evolutionary's Eliminators are dispatched to exterminate a drug cartel. The Punisher discovers the battle and dispatches with both sides.

Meanwhile, the High Evolutionary visits the Eternals and persuades them aid his cause by mapping the genetic code of the Silver Surfer. The Surfer refuses to cooperate, and convinces the Eternals to let him be.

The Purifiers set about removing the powers of mutants deemed to pose a threat to humanity. When they capture Magma from Nova Roma, the inner circle of the Hellfire Club and the New Mutants storm the Purifier base in Wyoming to rescue her. During the struggle, Mirage inadvertently has her powers enhanced, allowing her to physically manifest the illusions she casts.

With the supply of drugs cut off by events in Bogotá, a drug war escalates in New York City, made worse by the Purifiers murdering drug dealers. Seeking to retaliate against the ones who disrupted his drug trade, the Kingpin learns about the High Evolutionary's scheme and allows the information to reach Spider-Man and Daredevil. Along with Speedball, they defeat the Purifiers before they can enact the High Evolutionary's plan to sterilize all undesirable individuals in the city.

While the royal family of the Inhumans is on Earth demanding that Crystal leave the Fantastic Four, The High Evolutionary leads a squad of Gatherers and Eliminators to the Blue Area of the Moon to obtain the Inhumans' Terrigen Mist. Quicksilver leads the Inhumans in defending Attilan until the royal family and the Fantastic Four arrive to repel the invaders.

The High Evolutionary next travels to the site of the Savage Land, hoping to restore the damage wrought by Terminus. The X-Men are drawn to the scene as well and aid the Evolutionary in freeing Garokk from Terminus's power armor. Garokk and the Evolutionary succeed in restoring the Savage Land, and the survivors of Terminus's original attack return from the extradimensional realm in which they had taken refuge.

The Exterminators attempt to seal off the Nexus of All Realities in the Everglades to prevent extradimensional entities from polluting humanity's genetic stock. One such entity known as Ylandris takes possession of Cecilia Cardinale, transforming her into Poison in order to stop the Evolutionary's plan, while Spider-Man and the Man-Thing defeat the Exterminators.

In the broadest part of his plans, the High Evolutionary plots to construct a bomb that will genetically alter all life on Earth. He sends the Gatherers and a superhuman team known as the Sensors to Wakanda to obtain vibranium necessary for completion of the bomb. Unbeknownst to the Evolutionary, one of the scientists he has forced into his service is Bill Foster, who surreptitiously alerts the Black Panther to the situation. The Panther and the West Coast Avengers defend Wakanda but are unable to prevent the theft of the vibranium. Coincidentally, estranged Avengers Moon Knight, Tigra, and Mockingbird happen upon the High Evolutionary's citadel in the Savage Land and rescue Foster, who recovers his Giant-Man powers. With the security of his base compromised, he relocates his base to the floor of the Pacific Ocean.

Before completion of the genetic bomb, the High Evolutionary sends Gatherers to capture a rogue clone of Gwen Stacy for further study, while he visits the Young Gods. Some of the Young Gods decide to interfere with the Evolutionary's master plan, and encounter Spider-Man trying to rescue the clone. The High Evolutionary claims that "Gwen" is not in fact a clone but someone genetically altered to resemble the original Gwen Stacy, and returns her and Spider-Man to Manhattan. Daydreamer of the Young Gods restores the woman's original memories and appearance.

The Evolutionary's researchers reassemble Jocasta, who immediately turns on her captors and attempts to contact the East Coast Avengers about the genetic bomb. However, the team has disbanded and abandoned their headquarters, leaving its computers to assemble an ad hoc team of inactive reservists: The Captain, the Falcon, Hercules, Beast, and Hulk. Yellowjacket (Rita DeMara) answers the summons (which she received via the communications equipment she stole from her predecessor) and is allowed to join the team. Using the High Evolutionary's equipment, the Avengers hyper-evolve Hercules until he is able to match the Evolutionary's power in combat. Both Hercules and the High Evolutionary are apparently destroyed in the battle, leaving the Avengers free to stop the genetic bomb and save the world.

== Backup stories ==
Each chapter of the crossover features a short back up strip titled "The High Evolutionary" which was written by Mark Gruenwald with pencil art by Paris Cullins and Ron Lim. This 11 part story details the origins of the High Evolutionary, his previous storylines, and key events in which he participated (such as the origins of Spider-Woman, Quicksilver, and the Scarlet Witch). The series concludes by revealing how the High Evolutionary survived his apparent suicide and began plotting the Evolutionary War.

In the course of the story, it is revealed that the High Evolutionary received help from a mysterious benefactor, who provided him with the secrets of the human genetic code and access to Moloids to build his base on Wundagore Mountain. The story never reveals the identity of the benefactor, although it was long speculated to be either Phaeder of the Inhumans or the X-Men villain Mister Sinister. It wasn't until nearly 25 years later that Marvel confirmed the identity of the mysterious ally to have been Phaeder.

The backup stories were intended to be read in the same order as the lead stories. However, the backups in Amazing Spider-Man Annual #22 and Fantastic Four Annual #21 are transposed, creating some confusion. Amazing Spider-Man Annual #22 contains part 5 of the lead story and part 6 of the backups; Fantastic Four Annual #21 contains part 6 of the lead story and part 5 of the backups. This can be confirmed by reading the relevant stories: In the lead story of Fantastic Four Annual #21, the Watcher refers to events in the lead story of Amazing Spider-Man Annual #22; whereas in the backup of Amazing Spider-Man Annual #22 the High Evolutionary has subdued the werewolf he fought in the backup of Fantastic Four Annual #21.

== Related stories ==
At the time of the crossover, Marvel was publishing a comic book based on the TV series ALF, and so ALF Annual #1 served as a tongue-in-cheek unofficial tie-in to the story in which the High Evolutionary meets ALF. Years later, the Official Handbook of the Marvel Universe confirmed the canonicity of this story.

In Avengers West Coast Annual #4 the U.S. Agent discovers one of the High Evolutionary's storm troopers on an unpopulated Pacific atoll, who is unaware that the Evolutionary War has ended.

Thor #407 follows up on the events of Avengers Annual #17 to reveal the fates of Hercules and the High Evolutionary.

== Alternate versions ==
=== What If? ===
A postscript of sorts to the series came with What If...? vol. 2 #1 (July, 1989) written by Roy Thomas, which explores the question "What if the Avengers lost the Evolutionary War?". In this version of the story, the reserve Avengers are unable to stop the High Evolutionary from detonating his bomb. As a result, the evolution of all human life on earth is hyper-accelerated. This process causes humanity to evolve beyond conflict with each other, and between humans and mutants. When Celestials eventually arrive to destroy the Earth, the combined powers of humanity's minds destroy one of them, forcing the remainder to retreat. Mutants, already one step ahead of homo sapiens on the evolutionary scale, ascend to the next level and join together to form a combined group which leaves for space, ultimately destroying Galactus and merging with Death and Eternity to form a being so powerful that it enables the Big Bang of another universe.

== Bibliography ==
=== The Evolutionary War ===
- Part 1: X-Factor Annual #3
- Part 2: The Punisher Annual #1
- Part 3: Silver Surfer Annual #1
- Part 4: New Mutants Annual #4
- Part 5: Fantastic Four Annual #21
- Part 6: The Amazing Spider-Man Annual #22
- Part 7: X-Men Annual #12
- Part 8: Web of Spider-Man Annual #4
- Part 9: West Coast Avengers Annual #3
- Part 10: The Spectacular Spider-Man Annual #8
- Part 11: The Avengers Annual #17

=== Related issues ===
- ALF Annual #1 (1988)
- What If...? volume 2 #1 (July, 1989)
