= Bova (comics) =

Publication information
- Publisher: Marvel Comics
- First appearance: Giant-Size Avengers #1 (Aug. 1974)
- Created by: Roy Thomas; Rich Buckler

In-story information
- Full name: Bova Ayrshire
- Species: Uplifted Guernsey cattle
- Team affiliations: New Men

Bova is a fictional character appearing in American comic books published by Marvel Comics. She is an anthropomorphic cattle who was evolved into her current form by the High Evolutionary. The character is connected to the New Men and the heroes Scarlet Witch and Quicksilver, having worked as a nanny to them all.

== Publication history ==
Bova first appeared in Giant-Size Avengers #1 (August 1974), and was created by writer Roy Thomas and artist Rich Buckler.

== Fictional character biography ==
Bova is a Guernsey cattle and one of the New Men (creatures genetically engineered and altered into an anthropomorphic form by the High Evolutionary).

A woman named Magda—pregnant with twins Pietro Maximoff and Wanda Maximoff—takes sanctuary at Mount Wundagore in Transia, the home of the High Evolutionary, after seeing her husband Magnus use his magnetic powers for the first time. Fearing that Magnus would discover the children, Magda leaves the sanctuary and dies of exposure to the elements. The twins are attended by Bova. Bova soon assists the World War II superheroine Miss America through labor, but the birth results in a stillborn child and Miss America dies. Bova hides the truth from her husband Robert Frank and claims that only the mother has died, and that he now has twin children. Frank is shocked at the death of his wife and flees. Bova therefore serves as the foster mother to Pietro and Wanda. The High Evolutionary also had Bova raise and nurture the young New Men as their nanny.

Bova is among the New Men who are killed by the High Evolutionary after he learns that the Celestials are coming to Earth to judge it.

== Powers and abilities ==
As a cattle, Bova possesses physical abilities superior to that of a human. She is a skilled nurse and caretaker who has fostered several superheroes.

== In other media ==
Bova appears in the X-Men: The Animated Series episode "Family Ties", voiced by Shirley Douglas.
