= New Men (Marvel Comics) =

Fictional comic book characters

- The Knights of Wundagore. From left to right: Sir Delphis, Lord Anon, Sir Tyger, Lady Vermin, Lady Ursula, Sir Steed (tan shadow), Lord Churchill, Quicksilver (human leader), Sir Ram, and Sir Gator.

Publication information
- First appearance: Thor #134 (December 1966)
- Created by: Stan Lee (writer); Jack Kirby (artist)

Characteristics
- Place of origin: Wundagore, Earth
- Notable members: Bova; Lady Vermin; Lord Byson; Lord Gator; Lord Tyger; Sir Delphis; Sir Lyan; Sir Ram; Snow Queen

The New Men are a fictional group of characters appearing in American comic books published by Marvel Comics. They are depicted as uplifted animals created by the High Evolutionary.

== Publication history ==
The New Men first appeared in Thor #134 and were created by Stan Lee and Jack Kirby.

== Fictional group history ==
The New Men are the result of Herbert Wyndham's first experiments in accelerated evolution. When Wyndham learns that Mount Wundagore, the site of his citadel, is the prison of the demon Chthon, he decides to train some of his creations in chivalry and battle tactics so that they can oppose Chthon should he ever return. These elite New Men warriors are called the Knights of Wundagore.

Wyndham converts his citadel into a spaceship and he and most of his New Men leave to explore the stars. They eventually settle on a planet which they name Wundagore II.

When the High Evolutionary's Counter-Earth resurfaces under unknown circumstances, some of the New Men are seen living on it. They are routinely exterminated and recreated by the High Evolutionary when they fail to meet his standards. Some of these New Men "flaws" take refuge in Lowtown, where they are given shelter by a man called the Low Evolutionary.

== Members ==
Known New Men have included:

- Ani-Men - This incarnation of the Ani-Men was created by the High Evolutionary.
  - Buzzard - An uplifted hawk.
  - Crushtacean - An uplifted crab.
  - Flying Fox - An uplifted bat.
  - Komodo - An uplifted Komodo dragon.
  - Spinneret - An uplifted spider.
- Ani-Mutants - A group of New Men who the High Evolutionary cast aside in favor of the Godpack. They became followers of Man-Beast.
  - Simbus - An uplifted lion and an ally of Man-Beast.
  - Tantaro - An uplifted elephant from the Bronx Zoo.
  - Urson-Wellz - An uplifted bear from the Bronx Zoo. He was named for Orson Welles.
- Barber - An unnamed uplifted mouse who works as a barber.
- Bova - An uplifted Guernsey cattle who serves as the foster mother to Pietro Maximoff and Wanda Maximoff, as well as the other New Men.
- Caninus - An uplifted dog.
- Cult of the Jackal - A group of New Men who formed a cult that worships Jackal and long to be fully human. The cult is dissolved when Scarlet Spider and High Evolutionary convince them to give up their mission.
  - Anubia - An uplifted jackal.
  - Caiman - An uplifted caiman.
  - Harrier - An uplifted hawk.
  - Piranis - An uplifted piranha.
- Dempsey - A dalmatian who was the High Evolutionary's first creation. He was killed by poachers.
- Dicero - A young uplifted black rhinoceros and a student of Prosimia and Lady Bova.
- Drhovo - An unspecified uplifted amphibian who is one of the High Evolutionary's bodyguards.
- Eaglus - An uplifted eagle.
- Equius - An uplifted horse.
- Felinatus - An uplifted cat.
- Gorr - An uplifted golden gorilla who works as the High Evolutionary's valet.
- Inheritor - An uplifted cockroach. Inheritor rebels against the High Evolutionary. During a battle with Hulk, he is returned to his original form.
- Ja'Rue - An uplifted cheetah.
- Kingii - An uplifted frilled lizard who was created by the High Evolutionary and then experimented upon by Man-Beast. He was devolved by the High Evolutionary.
- Kohbra - An uplifted snake who resides on Counter-Earth.
- Knights of Wundagore - The Knights of Wundagore are elite New Men warriors who were trained by the High Evolutionary to prepare for the return of Chthon.
  - Count Tagar - An uplifted tiger created on Counter-Earth. He later rebels against the High Evolutionary.
  - Lady Ursula - An uplifted brown bear who is boisterous and vicious. She proves to be just when she commits suicide rather than allow the Man-Beast to enslave her.
  - Lady Vermin - An uplifted rat who uses a jetpack to get around.
  - Lord Anon (formerly Sir Wulf) - An uplifted red wolf. He is killed by Man-Beast.
  - Lord Byson - An uplifted bison.
  - Lord Churchill - An uplifted bulldog who is honorable, loyal, and clever. He is killed by Man-Beast.
  - Lord Gator - An uplifted alligator who is quiet and mysterious, striking only when foes least expect it.
  - Lord Tyger - An uplifted tiger who is scholarly and wise. He is the leader of the Knights of Wundagore.
  - Sir Delphis - An uplifted dolphin who is inquisitive and thinks through his plans before acting. He later left the team.
  - Sir Gote - An uplifted goat.
  - Sir Hogg - An unidentified uplifted pig.
  - Sir Lepard - An uplifted leopard. He dies during a battle with the Rigellians.
  - Sir Lepard (second) - A second character with this name and successor to the original Sir Lepard.
  - Sir Lyan - An uplifted lion. He is the second-in-command of the Knights of Wundagore.
  - Sir Ossilot - An uplifted ocelot. He dies during a battle with the Rigellians.
  - Sir Panther - An uplifted panther.
  - Sir Porga - An uplifted pig. He is killed by his fellow New Men when they started to give in to their animalistic natures.
  - Sir Ram - An uplifted ram who is noble and knightly. He is pledged in faith to his lord and master. He is killed when the ship he was on with Bruce Banner was hit with radiation.
  - Sir Ram (second) - A second character with this name that was the successor of the original Sir Ram.
  - Sir Steed - An uplifted horse. He jumps in front of a blast intended to kill Luna.
  - Sir Ursus - An uplifted bear.
  - Snow Queen - An uplifted white tiger who is the sister of White Tiger.
- Kohbra - An uplifted snake.
- Lady Shadra - An uplifted black panther who is one of the High Evolutionary's first New Men.
- Man-Beast - An uplifted red wolf who developed vast mental powers. He schemes to destroy humanity and the High Evolutionary, but he is eventually devolved back into a red wolf with the help of Quicksilver.
- Man-Beast's Followers - A group of New Men that are on Man-Beast's side.
  - Barachuudar - An uplifted fish who works for Man-Beast as one of his presidential aides on Counter-Earth.
  - Cobrah - An uplifted cobra who works for Man-Beast as one of his presidential aides on Counter-Earth.
  - Haukk - An uplifted hawk.
  - Lizhardus - An uplifted lizard.
  - Monck - An uplifted gibbon.
  - Pih-Junn - An uplifted pigeon who was partnered with Haukk.
  - Snakar - An uplifted snake who works for Man-Beast as one of the presidential aides on Counter-Earth.
  - Triax the Terrible - An uplifted common warthog who is a follower of Man-Beast.
  - Weezhil - An uplifted weasel who works for Man-Beast as one of his presidential aides on Counter-Earth.
- Mongoose - An uplifted mongoose possesses super strength, speed, agility and reflexes. He is a former member of the Thunderbolts.
- Mynos - An uplifted cattle who works for the New Immortals.
- Porcunis - An uplifted porcupine.
- Prosimia - An uplifted ring-tailed lemur and storyteller. He sacrifices his life to protect Kitty Pryde from Man-Beast's attack.
- Squire Gulo - An uplifted wolverine who is trained by Lady Shandra.
- Tabur - An uplifted cat. Agatha Harkness casts a spell on him while he is fighting Tigra and he is reverted into a cat.
- White Tiger - An uplifted white tigress created to hunt down Man-Beast. She returns to her animal form following Man-Beast's defeat.

== In other media ==
=== Television ===
- The New Men appear in the X-Men: The Animated Series episode "Family Ties".
- The New Men, referred to as Bestials, appear in Spider-Man Unlimited. The Knights of Wundagore consists of Sir Ram (voiced by Ron Halder), Sir Tyger (voiced by David Sobolov), Lady Ursula (voiced by Tasha Simms), and Lady Vermin (voiced by Jennifer Hale). The Bestials are residents of Counter-Earth and serve as the dominant species with humans being a second-class minority.

=== Film ===
The New Men serve as loose inspiration for the Humanimals who appear in Guardians of the Galaxy Vol. 3.
