= Man-Beast =

Fictional Marvel comic book character

- The Man-Beast as depicted in Thor #135 (December 1966). Art by Jack Kirby, Vince Colletta, Stan Goldberg, and Sam Rosen.

Publication information
- Publisher: Marvel Comics
- First appearance: Thor #134 (November 1966)
- Created by: Stan Lee; Jack Kirby

In-story information
- Species: Uplifted red wolf
- Team affiliations: New Men
- Notable aliases: Super-Beast; Rex Carpenter
- Abilities: Superior hand-to-hand combatant Superhuman strength, speed, durability and intelligence Enhanced senses Psychic powers Use of technological weapons and gadgets Ability to see into the infrared and ultraviolet range of the light spectrum

The Man-Beast (originally Super-Beast) is a fictional character appearing in American comic books published by Marvel Comics.

== Publication history ==
Man-Beast first appeared in Thor #134 (November 1966), and was created by writer Stan Lee and artist Jack Kirby. He is first referred to as "Man-Beast" in issue #135.

== Fictional character biography ==
The Man-Beast was once an ordinary red wolf before being captured and mutated by the High Evolutionary - a being intent on creating an army of New Men from animals. After being transformed, the wolf is pushed to physical and mental perfection and gains a hatred of all other forms of life.

The creature, now calling itself the Man-Beast, is launched into space and lands on Counter-Earth, a planet created by the High Evolutionary. The Man-Beast, seeking to become a conqueror, poses as Counter-Earth's president, Rex Carpenter. The High Evolutionary sends Adam Warlock, who after a lengthy war defeats the Man-Beast and his followers. During Warlock's battle with the Man-Beast, the High Evolutionary gives him the Soul Gem, which becomes his primary weapon.

The Man-Beast eventually re-emerges and allies with the Bi-Beast to battle Thor and Iron Man. Defeated again, the Man-Beast later discovers the existence of the Infinity Gems and steals four of the gems from Adam Warlock. Warlock eventually stops the Man-Beast and is only prevented from killing him by Captain America. The Man-Beast is defeated when the High Evolutionary, with the aid of Quicksilver, reverts the creature back into a red wolf.

== Powers and abilities ==
The Man-Beast is a red wolf evolved to the peak of physical and mental potential, possessing superhuman physical abilities and senses. He is a skilled hand-to-hand combatant and a powerful psychic capable of manipulating emotions, creating force fields, and generating antimatter fields capable of disintegrating positive matter.
