= Mongoose (comics) =

Publication information
- Publisher: Marvel Comics
- First appearance: In shadow: The Amazing Spider-Man #283 (December 1986); Full appearance: Thor #391 (May 1988)
- Created by: Tom DeFalco; Ron Frenz (Spider-Man issue)

In-story information
- Alter ego: Mongoose
- Species: Uplifted mongoose
- Team affiliations: New Men/Knights of Wundagore; Masters of Evil; Thunderbolts
- Abilities: Excellent hand-to-hand combatant Superhuman strength, speed, agility, stamina and reflexes Wears artificial claws Carries a cellsmograph Use of gas pellets Concussive blasts via wrist device Access to the advanced sky-craft and land vehicles of Wundagore

Mongoose is a supervillain appearing in American comic books published by Marvel Comics.

== Publication history ==
The Mongoose first appeared in The Amazing Spider-Man #283, and was created by writer Tom DeFalco and artist Ron Frenz. The character appeared only in shadow, as DeFalco and Frenz merely teased his presence and planned to use him in a future storyline in The Amazing Spider-Man. However, they did not have the opportunity to use the character before leaving the book. The Mongoose was fully introduced over one year later in Thor #391, after DeFalco and Frenz took over that book. The character therefore became a recurring enemy of Thor instead of Spider-Man.

== Fictional character biography ==
Mongoose was originally a normal mongoose before the High Evolutionary subjected him to genetic engineering and transformed him into an anthropomorphic form to serve as his agent. At one point, Mongoose arrives in New York, where he is invited by Baron Zemo to join his Masters of Evil. Mongoose is later beaten by Thor with Spider-Man's help, and this confrontation eventually causes Thor and Mongoose to become mortal enemies. After his first defeat at the hands of Thor, Mongoose flees. During his escape, he causes a fall of girders which injures Erik Masterson, who would later become the hero Thunderstrike.

In a later plot against Thor, Mongoose teams up with Quicksand and Count Tagar to obtain cell samples from Thor. He joins Tagar into using a weapon called the "vivisector" to obtain the samples, while Quicksand causes a distraction by battling Thor. Mongoose also manages to launch an attack against Thor at Mount Wundagore by the New Men, a collection of genetically altered warriors who defend Wundagore. When Thor eventually realizes what was going on, Mongoose, Quicksand, and Tagar are defeated. Mongoose manages to escape after Tagar halts the battle.

Mongoose tries to rejoin the New Men, but is rejected due to his villainous actions. Furious over this, Mongoose later attacks both Thor and Erik Masterson in retaliation. He is about to defeat them, but Hercules steps in to assist. Mongoose realizes he had no chance of winning and flees.

Mongoose is arrested by Baron Zemo's Thunderbolts after a battle in Philadelphia. Instead of a legally required trial process, he is offered membership in the team or outright jail. Refusing to go to jail, Mongoose accepts the offer to join the team.

Mongoose has been identified as one of the 142 registered superheroes who are a part of the Fifty State Initiative.

In The Punisher War Journal, Mongoose is among the animal-themed supervillains who are kidnapped by Alyosha Kravinoff before being rescued by the Punisher.

== Powers and abilities ==
Genetic engineering by the High Evolutionary granted Mongoose superhuman strength, speed, stamina, agility, and reflexes. He is a skilled hand-to-hand combatant, utilizing his agility to create a unique fighting style.

The Mongoose wears artificial claws on his gloves, and uses gas pellets (causing dizziness and disorientation), and a wrist device used to project concussive blasts. He has also carried a cellsmograph, a device for determining the presence of a living being by identifying its genetic structure. He also has access to the advanced sky-craft and land vehicles of Wundagore, and once used an "asteroid blaster" to attack Thor.
