= Bloodaxe =

Bloodaxe can refer to:

- Eric Bloodaxe (c. 885 – 954), a Viking king
- Erik Bloodaxe (hacker), an alias of American computer hacker Chris Goggans
- Bloodaxe Books, a British publishing house specializing in poetry
- Bloodaxe (character), a Marvel Comics anti-hero
- Brian Bloodaxe, a British platform game
- B'hrian Bloodaxe, a Discworld character
- Bloodaxe, a nickname of Danish cricketer Ole Mortensen (born 1958)
