= Spider-Man Unlimited =

Spider-Man American animated television series

- Genre: Superhero; Cyberpunk
- Based on: Spider-Man by: Stan Lee; Steve Ditko
- Developed by: Avi Arad; Will Meugniot
- Written by: Larry Brody; Robert Gregory Browne; Brynne Chandler; Michael Reaves
- Directed by: Patrick Archibald
- Voices of: Rino Romano; Garry Chalk; Brian Drummond; Michael Donovan; Christopher Gaze; Ron Halder; Jennifer Hale; Kim Hawthorne; Rhys Huber; Akiko Morison; Richard Newman; John Payne II; Tasha Simms; David Sobolov; Dale Wilson
- Theme music composer: Jeremy Sweet; Ian Nickus
- Composers: Jeremy Sweet; Ian Nickus; Shuki Levy; Kussa Mahchi; Ron Kenan
- Countries of origin: United States; Canada
- Original language: English
- No. of seasons: 1
- No. of episodes: 13

Production
- Executive producers: Avi Arad; Eric S. Rollman
- Producer: Will Meugniot
- Running time: 22 minutes
- Production companies: Marvel Studios; Saban Entertainment; Atomic Cartoons (uncredited)

Original release
- Network: Fox (Fox Kids)
- Release: October 2, 1999 – March 31, 2001

Spider-Man Unlimited is an animated television series produced by Saban Entertainment which features the Marvel comic book superhero Spider-Man and serves as a follow-up to Spider-Man: The Animated Series. Unlimited premiered in 1999. Alhough it had fair ratings, Spider-Man Unlimited was overshadowed by Pokémon and the newly debuted Digimon; it was canceled after airing only a few episodes. Fox Kids later resumed airing the show from 1999 to 2001, airing 13 episodes, the last ending on a cliffhanger.

The specific incarnation of Spider-Man who serves as the focus of Spider-Man Unlimited made a return in the 2023 feature film Spider-Man: Across the Spider-Verse, depicted as a member of Miguel O'Hara's Spider-Society.

== Production ==
Spider-Man, in a new costume designed by Shannon Denton and Roy Burdine.

Initially, the goal was to do a low-budget adaptation of the first 26 issues of The Amazing Spider-Man comic book. However, Sony and Marvel Studios had already engaged in a deal to produce the Spider-Man film; as such, Saban Entertainment was cut from any source and could not use the traditional Spider-Man suit or adapt the early comics. Also, in the original idea, Spider-Man was stranded in a Counter-Earth in which Ben Parker did not die and thus Peter Parker lacked the moral fortitude to resist becoming Venom. However, Marvel Comics did not like the idea and stated that they would not do a story with two Peter Parkers. Additionally, the show was made after Marvel decided not to move ahead with a show focusing on Spider-Man 2099 following consideration due to the DC Comics series Batman Beyond premiering earlier that year and having a similar futuristic setting.

Unlike the previous series which used digital ink and paint, the animation on the series was made using traditional cel animation. The characters' designs, including Spider-Man's new outfit, were done by Shannon Denton and Roy Burdine. The show's music was handled by Saban Entertainment, and credited to Shuki Levy and Haim Saban (under his composing alias Kussa Mahchi). The music for Spider-Man: The Animated Series was also handled by Saban Entertainment and credited to Shuki Levy and Kussa Mahchi, although Saban were less involved with that show than they were with Spider-Man Unlimited.

"One Is the Loneliest Number" was produced as, and supposed to be, episode 10, but it was packaged as the 11th by Fox Kids' decision, thus creating continuity errors with Spider-Man referring to his battle with Venom at the middle of "Family Matters" while this battle was delayed by an episode and with the High Evolutionary referring to Spider-Man's interference with his attempts to control the Symbiotes near the end of "Family Matters", which also happens in "One Is the Loneliest Number" and is yet to be shown to the audience.

Several scripts were written for Season 2, including the conclusion of the cliffhanger, but were never produced.

== Reception ==
Spider-Man Unlimited received mixed to moderately positive reviews from critics and audiences. On Rotten Tomatoes, Season 1 holds a 50% Tomatometer score based on critic reviews, reflecting a range of opinions.

Common Sense Media noted that the series explored more mature themes than typical children’s cartoons, such as racial purity, totalitarianism, and conflict between species, making it better suited for older children and tweens.

Retrospective reviews have praised the show for its ambitious sci‑fi setting and unique take on Spider-Man; however, critics also pointed out weaknesses in writing, pacing, and unresolved storylines, largely due to its cancellation after a single 13-episode season.

User scores on Metacritic indicate a small but dedicated fanbase, suggesting that while the show was not widely popular during its original run, it developed a modest cult following over time.

== Plot ==
While covering the launch of John Jameson's one-man mission to Counter-Earth (another Earth located on the far side of the Sun), Spider-Man attempts to stop his two symbiote adversaries Venom and Carnage from boarding the shuttlecraft. Blamed for losing contact with Jameson by J. Jonah Jameson of the Daily Bugle, Spider-Man becomes a target of persecution by the media and the public at large, with a bounty placed on his head. After John Jameson sends out a distress signal, Spider-Man borrows nanotechnology from Reed Richards to design a new suit that incorporates built in upgraded webshooters and spider-tracers, stealth technology and anti-symbiote sonic weaponry. Making his way to Counter-Earth after persuading an attacking Nick Fury to let him rescue Jameson, Spider-Man learns that Jameson has fallen in with a band of freedom fighters opposed to the High Evolutionary whose Bestials, hybrids of animal and humanoid attributes, are the dominant species whilst humans are the second-class minority.

With Jameson reluctant to return until all of the Bestials are defeated, Spider-Man elects to remain on Counter-Earth, blending in as best as he can as Peter Parker, taking up residence in the apartment of a doctor, Naoko Yamada-Jones and her son Shane and fighting the High Evolutionary, his Knights of Wundagore, and his Machine Men alongside the rebels as Spider-Man. It is soon discovered that Venom and Carnage are also on Counter-Earth, and are following orders from the Synoptic, a hive-minded legion of Counter-Earth symbiotes.

This series also shows the animated version of John Jameson's Man-Wolf form, superhero versions of mainstream villains Green Goblin and Vulture, and Counter-Earth's counterparts of Kraven the Hunter and Electro.

== Characters ==
=== Heroes ===
- Peter Parker / Spider-Man (voiced by Rino Romano) – A photographer for the Daily Bugle newspaper who was bitten by a radioactive spider and received spider-like abilities, becoming the superhero known as Spider-Man. The series begins with Spider-Man attempting to stop Venom and Carnage from escaping in a rocket piloted by John Jameson. Failing to stop them, Venom and Carnage took the ship Counter-Earth, with Jameson hostage. Peter borrowed nanotechnology from Reed Richards to design a new suit to counter the symbiotes' powers. He travels to Counter-Earth where he learns that Jameson has fallen in with a band of freedom fighters opposed to the High Evolutionary whose Bestials, hybrids of animal and humanoid attributes, are the dominant species whilst humans are the second-class minority.
- Dr. Naoko Yamada-Jones (voiced by Akiko Morison) – A doctor on Counter-Earth. After Peter rescues her son Shane from a Machine Man, she gave Peter an offer to live in her house rent-free for two weeks, which he accepts. She is married to Hector Jones, her long-lost husband. She was initially Spider-Man's ally, but after her clinic was damaged during a brawl between Spider-Man, Venom, and Carnage, she began to hate the hero, unaware that Spider-Man is actually Peter Parker.
- Shane Yamada-Jones (voiced by Rhys Huber) – The 10-year-old only son of Dr. Naoko Yamada and Hector Jones. He looks up to Peter and hates when Peter and Naoko fight as it reminds him of his parents fighting and eventual split. He, like his mother, does not know of Peter's Spider-Man secret.
- John Jameson / Man-Wolf (voiced by John Payne as John Jameson, Scott McNeil as Man-Wolf) – The leader of a team of rebels who fight against the High Evolutionary, and arrived on Counter-Earth after crash-landing there due to interference from Venom and Carnage, who had stowed aboard his ship. Later in the series, in the episode "Ill Lit By Moonlight", Jameson is subject to the High Evolutionary's experiments, giving him the ability to transform into the Man-Wolf when angered.
- Counter-Earth Rebellion – A group of humans that lead a rebellion against the High Evolutionary's forces.
  - Karen O'Malley (voiced by Kim Hawthorne) – The second-in-command of the Rebellion and John Jameson's love interest. In "Sins of the Father", it is revealed that she is the granddaughter of the High Evolutionary, who experimented on her when she was still in the womb, giving her superhuman strength and agility.
  - Daniel Bromely (voiced by Christopher Gaze) – A member of the Rebellion from New York City whose family was taken by the High Evolutionary, with him joining the group to get revenge.
  - Git Hoskins – A mute, mummy-like member with the ability to stretch and manipulate his bandages. He gained his abilities as a child from experimentation by Sir Ram, and as a result was left an outcast, developing a personal grudge against Sir Ram.
  - X-51 (voiced by Dale Wilson) – An obsolete Machine Man who unexpectedly gained sentience. As a result, it becomes benevolent and protects humans from the High Evolutionary.

=== Villains ===
- High Evolutionary (voiced by Richard Newman) – The main antagonist of the series, a human scientist who believes that greater genetic diversity heightens survival traits. He left Earth to travel to Counter-Earth to begin anew, but found the same destructive tendencies that humans had plagued his Earth with. He then proceeded to create a new society, with human/animal creatures loyal only to him called Bestials. The High Evolutionary also created an elite squad of Bestials called the Knights of Wundagore, who also use the Machine Men as law enforcers to keep the humans in order. The New York City on Counter-Earth is divided vertically with humans living on the bottom and the Bestials living miles above the street. Late in the series, it was revealed to the High Evolutionary that he is the grandfather of Karen O'Malley and that he experimented on her when she was young.
- Knights of Wundagore – A group of elite Bestials who serve the High Evolutionary.
  - Lord Tyger (voiced by David Sobolov) – A genetically evolved tiger and one of the High Evolutionary's first New Men. He was later placed as the leader of the Knights of Wundagore. Unlike most Beastials, Tyger has the most tolerance of humans.
  - Sir Ram (voiced by Ron Halder) – One of the High Evolutionary's Knights of Wundagore and a genetically evolved bighorn sheep. He has done various experiments and was responsible for Git's current appearance as well as creating Firedrake.
  - Lady Vermin (voiced by Jennifer Hale) – One of the High Evolutionary's Knights of Wundagore and a genetically evolved rat. She has a crush on Spider-Man and often tries to seduce him.
  - Lady Ursula (voiced by Tasha Simms) – One of the High Evolutionary's Knights of Wundagore and a genetically evolved bear.
- Machine Men (voiced by Dale Wilson) – A group of robots that serve as the law enforcers of the High Evolutionary and often back up the Knights of Wundagore.
- Eddie Brock / Venom (voiced by Brian Drummond) – One of the series' main antagonists, by this time, the Venom Symbiote has merged completely with him and he attempts to conquer Counter-Earth alongside Carnage with an invasion of Symbiotes. Eddie himself is briefly separated from Venom in the episode "One Is the Loneliest Number" when the Bestials wanted to experiment on it.
- Cletus Kasady / Carnage (voiced by Michael Donovan) – One of the series' main antagonists, the symbiote is in complete control of Kasady and works well with Venom. They traveled to Counter-Earth to join the Symnoptic, a similar hive mind of symbiotes.
- The Hunter (voiced by Paul Dobson) – The Counter-Earth version of Kraven the Hunter who is bald-headed with a ponytail and is always barefoot. He is one of a few humans that the High Evolutionary allows to live in the upper parts of the city. He works as a mercenary for both the rebels and the High Evolutionary. The Hunter is hired by the High Evolutionary to hunt and kill and/or capture Spider-Man. Upon breaking into his lair, Spider-Man discovered that the Hunter was using a toxic formula that when mixed with certain animal pheromones gives traits of that animal to the drinker, but also poisons bone marrow, damages the liver, and cuts the lifespan in half. The Hunter stated it's a necessary sacrifice for the power it brings. Spider-Man defeats him by trouncing him and turning his security system against him stating that he now knows the Hunter's secret. Spider-Man warns the Hunter that if he comes after the Rebels or him again, he will use this knowledge to beat him into the ground.
- Electro (voiced by Dale Wilson) – The Counter-Earth version of Electro, he's a Bestial electric eel that possesses electrical powers. In "Ill-Met by Moonlight", Electro is a guard for the High Evolutionary's main base Wundagore Castle. During the fight, Spider-Man continues to make references about the original Electro.

=== Others ===
- J. Jonah Jameson (voiced by Richard Newman) – The father of John Jameson who runs the Daily Bugle. He only appears in "Worlds Apart" Pt. 1 where he blames Spider-Man for what happened with his son's shuttle, putting a $10 million bounty on Spider-Man's head.
- Mary Jane Watson-Parker (voiced by Jennifer Hale) – At some point, Mary Jane Watson married Peter, and Peter revealed his secret identity as Spider-Man to her. They continued to be a happily married couple and Mary Jane was constantly worried about Peter's life as Spider-Man. When Peter chased Venom and Carnage to Counter-Earth, MJ remained behind on Earth and waited for him.
- Nick Fury (voiced by Mark Gibbon) – A member of S.H.I.E.L.D. He only appears in "Worlds Apart", confronting Spider-Man over his theft of a shuttle to hitch a ride to Counter-Earth.
- Green Goblin / Hector Jones (voiced by Rino Romano) – The heroic Counter-Earth version of Green Goblin. He is an ally of the Rejects, a group of Bestials whom the High Evolutionary deemed useless and abandoned, and wields a winged backpack rather than a glider. Additionally, he initially mistakes Spider-Man for a villain before learning the truth and becoming an ally to him.
- Mr. Meugniot (voiced by Garry Chalk) – The editor of the Daily Byte, who is named after series producer Will Meugniot.
- Vulture (voiced by Scott McNeil) – The Counter-Earth version of the Vulture, who is a Bestial with bird genes. He previously lived in the upper world and aided his rich friends in tormenting humans, but reformed after unwittingly setting his human friend's home on fire.

== Episodes ==
The following list reflects the correct viewing order of the Spider-Man Unlimited episodes.

No.	Title	Written by	Original release date
1	"Worlds Apart Part One"	Story by : Michael Reaves, Will Meugniot; Teleplay by : Michael Reaves	October 2, 1999
When Spider-Man spots his two main enemies Venom and Carnage, hijacking on John Jameson's spaceship on a trip to the mysterious planet Counter-Earth, he fails to stop them and the two symbiote villains go with Jameson to Counter-Earth where the ship crashes and Jameson presumably dies. J. Jonah Jameson and public then blames Spider-Man for Jameson's seeming death. Spider-Man fakes his own death and lies low for half a year until he gets a new nano-tech costume from Reed Richards. He then hijacks a shuttle, broadcasting that he's going to save John Jameson with Peter Parker tagging along to help clear his name, and gets another ride to Counter-Earth following a distress signal making it to Earth. He has an encounter with the Machine Men and the Knights of Wundagore who managed to capture him.
2	"Worlds Apart Part Two"	Story by : Michael Reaves, Will Meugniot; Teleplay by : Michael Reaves	October 9, 1999
After escaping from the Knights of Wundagore before he can be experimented on, Spider-Man finds out that John Jameson survived the crash. He has become a member of a rebellion fighting against the forces of the High Evolutionary, a figurehead who hates humans and creates animal-mutant hybrids called the Bestials. Spider-Man then joins the group and moves in with a single mother named Dr. Naoko Yamada-Jones and her son Shane Jones.
3	"Where Evil Nests"	Story by : Brynne Chandler Reaves, Will Meuginot; Teleplay by : Brynne Chandler Reaves	October 16, 1999
While Peter tries to get a job at the local paper, the Daily Byte, Spider-Man meets the Counter-Earth version of the Green Goblin, a hero who mistakes Spider-Man for a villain. Spider-Man realizes the kidnapper of Dr. Naoko Yamada-Jones is not the Goblin. The two team up to save her and stop a plan by her kidnappers responsible for the green Bio-Mass: Venom and Carnage.
4	"Deadly Choices"	Story by : Michael Reaves, Will Meugniot; Teleplay by : Steve Perry	December 23, 2000
A member of the rebellion against High Evolutionary named Git Hoskins steals a device from Sir Ram's lab, unaware it has a bomb inside which triggered after leaving the lab, threatening to blow up the Counter-Earth New York. The rebellion and the Bestials are forced to team up to get it back before both humans and Bestials are killed by the contagious compound within the bomb as Spider-Man learns Git's history that involved Sir Ram.
5	"Steel Cold Heart"	Story by : Roger Slifer, Will Meuginot; Teleplay by : Roger Slifer	January 13, 2001
A Machine Man named X-51 (the 51st off the assembly line), refuses to hurt innocent people. So he betrays the High Evolutionary and the Knights and decides to join the rebellion after he was previously saved by Spider-Man.
6	"Enter the Hunter!"	Story by : Michael Reaves, Roger Slifer; Teleplay by : Diane Duane, Peter Morwood	February 3, 2001
Sir Ram convinces the High Evolutionary that Spider-Man is too much of a problem and must be dealt with. To do so, Sir Ram hires the human assassin named the Hunter (Counter-Earth's version of Kraven the Hunter) to kill the hero – which becomes problematic when he finds evidence that Peter and Spider-Man are the same.
7	"Cry Vulture"	Larry Brody; Robert Gregory Browne	February 10, 2001
Spider-Man teams up with the Counter-Earth hero version of the Vulture when they discover Sir Ram has been kidnapping humans off the streets to be experimented on. Worst of all, the duo have to deal with Firedrake, a fire-breathing dragon monster acting as the guardian.
8	"Ill-Met by Moonlight"	Robert Gregory Browne; Larry Brody	February 17, 2001
Spider-Man learns from Naoko that John Jameson was experimented on by Sir Ram, turning into Man-Wolf if a special inhibitor chip isn't placed on him. Which becomes a problem when The Resistance enlist Spider-Man into breaking into the High Evolutionary's power plant. Here, he confronts an electric eel that is Counter-Earth's Bestial version of Electro.
9	"Sustenance"	Robert Gregory Browne; Larry Brody	March 3, 2001
Spider-Man jets off to the Counter-Earth Atlantic City on a lead to where the Solaris II is being stored. In doing so, The Goblin returns and figures out that Spider-Man is Peter Parker. They are both then kidnapped by Rejects, failed Bestials created by the High Evolutionary led by the butterfly-like Prima and also consisting of the platypus Bestial Alice, the horse Bestial Lester, and a bunch of unnamed Rejects. They attempt to sneak into one of the High Evolutionary's hideouts in Atlantic City so Spider-Man can escape where he pretends to help the Rejects.
10	"Matters of the Heart"	Mark Hoffmeier; Larry Brody	March 10, 2001
After a failed attempted at getting Lord Tyger, Spider-Man is shocked to see Bromley, a member of the rebellion, doing the Beastials a favor in helping capture Spider-Man. As it turns out, Bromley was promised to be reunited with his long-lost brother Durwood. Now, the two not only have to find Gabriel, but they have to escape Castle Wundagore, and the wrath of the High Evolutionary in person.
11	"One Is the Loneliest Number"	Robert Gregory Browne; Larry Brody	March 17, 2001
Eddie Brock is separated from the Venom symbiote by the Bestials so that it can be used in the experiment of the Texas horned lizard scientist Dr. Borowski. Spider-Man reluctantly agrees to retrieve it by donning it and then give it back to Brock before he dies while contending with Carnage.
12	"Sins of the Fathers"	Robert Gregory Browne; Larry Brody	March 24, 2001
Karen O'Malley, a member of the rebellion against the High Evolutionary, is kidnapped by Machine Men of the Evolutionary, so Spider-Man and X-51 teams up to save her. Meanwhile, the High Evolutionary realizes that Karen is his granddaughter.
13	"Destiny Unleashed"	Robert Gregory Browne; Larry Brody	March 31, 2001
Venom and Carnage reveal why they are on Counter-Earth. They have been working for the Synoptic, whose plan is to team up with the High Evolutionary. When the time is right, they will unleash millions of symbiotes on the planet to finally take over all of all life once and for all. Spider-Man, John Jameson, the rebellion, X-51 and the Goblin all team up to put an end to the High Evolutionary's plans. They appear too late when the plans of Venom and Carnage unfold and the symbiotes are unleashed, ending the series on a cliffhanger.

== Release and streaming ==
In Australia, the series aired on Network Ten's Cheez TV morning cartoon block in August 2001. It ran again on Cheez TV in June–July 2002.

As with the majority of the other Disney-acquired Marvel Comics animated series, Liberation Entertainment UK planned to release this on DVD in 2009. Due to Liberation's bankruptcy, the Marvel licenses were re-acquired by Clear Vision Ltd, who released it on DVD (in Region 2 PAL format) in a two-disk set containing all 13 episodes. It was released on the May 3, 2010. Marvel.com had uploaded all of the series – sponsored by Panasonic – to their website in late 2009; each week another episode was uploaded. All 13 episodes are available on Amazon.com.

In 2019, Disney released all 13 episodes on Disney+ for streaming.

== Comics ==
=== Comic adaptation ===
Alongside the animated series, Marvel Comics commissioned a comic to tie in with the series. It would be the second volume of Spider-Man Unlimited as a whole from the company, but the only one of the Unlimited volumes to be based on it. The first two issues were adapted from the first three episodes of the series, with the last three providing their own storyline in which Counter-Earth served as an alternate reality to Earth, rather than its own planet, with all of the Fantastic Four exist with the same human appearance and names but with other biographies. Reed Richards appears in one issue as The Brute, the Counter-Earth iteration of the Hulk.

In the final issue, Spider-Man meets an escapee from Haven, a Bestial version of Wolverine. After fighting, the two team up and take down a Bestial Chameleon. It is hinted that Wolverine is really Naoko Jones' missing husband (although the cartoon hints that the Goblin is really Naoko's husband). The question was never resolved as poor sales ended the comic's run.

The series was somewhat referred to in the Webspinners: Tales of Spider-Man issues #13 and 14 from February and March 2000, where the Peter Parker of Earth-616 is teleported into another dimension ruled by Blastaar while chasing Carnage (who himself was running away from the NYC police) and finds himself in the costume Spider-Man wore in this TV show. He joins forces with Dusk and remains in this suit until he defeats both villains and is transported back to his homeworld with the knocked-out Carnage.

=== Mainstream continuity ===
A copy of the series' universe, labeled Earth-7831, is massacred by Morlun's brother Daemos during the events of Spider-Verse. Another version of Spider-Man wearing this costume is seen alive and assisting other Spiders in the climax of Spider-Geddon.

== In other media ==
=== Film ===
The Peter Parker / Spider-Man from Spider-Man Unlimited appears in the animated feature film Spider-Man: Across the Spider-Verse (2023), depicted as a member of Miguel O'Hara's Spider-Society. He is revealed to have survived the cliffhanger ending of the series while the events after it however still remain unknown. An image of Eddie Brock turning into Venom from the episode "One Is the Loneliest Number" was used in the film.

=== Video games ===
The Unlimited suit appears as an unlockable costume for Spider-Man in Neversoft's Spider-Man video game and its 2001 sequel, Spider-Man 2: Enter: Electro.

=== Other ===
In 2025, Hasbro's Marvel Legends line released an action figure of this show's incarnation of Spider-Man.
