= Death-Stalker =

Death-Stalker is the name of two characters appearing in American comic books published by Marvel Comics.

== Publication history ==
The first Death-Stalker was Philip Sterling. An enemy of Daredevil, he first appeared as the Exterminator in Daredevil #39 (April 1968); he first appeared as Death-Stalker in Daredevil #113 (September 1974).

== Fictional character biography ==
=== Philip Sterling ===
Death-Stalker

Publication information
- Publisher: Marvel Comics
- First appearance: (as the Exterminator) Daredevil #39 (April 1968) (as Death-Stalker) Daredevil #113 (September 1974)
- Created by: (Exterminator) Stan Lee, Gene Colan (Death-Stalker) Steve Gerber, Bob Brown

In-story information
- Alter ego: Philip Wallace Sterling
- Team affiliations: Unholy Three
- Notable aliases: Exterminator
- Abilities: Interdimensional travel Death-grip gloves grant ability to kill a person upon contact

Philip Wallace Sterling was born in Riverdale, Bronx, New York. He was a wealthy man prior to embarking on a career as a professional criminal. When he first appears as the Exterminator, he recruits the Unholy Three and constructs a "time displacer ray" ("t-ray") which can teleport its target into another dimension. The Exterminator leads the Unholy Three in a series of criminal activities and battles Daredevil. When Daredevil defeats the Exterminator and his agents, he also destroys the t-ray, bombarding the Exterminator with its energy and seemingly killing him.

Exposure to the t-ray's energy turns Sterling's skin chalk-white and traps him between dimensions, only allowing him to return to Earth for a few hours at a time. He steals a pair of gloves from A.I.M. that give him a "death-grip," and begins calling himself "Death-Stalker." He tries several times to kill Daredevil and build a new t-ray machine, but most of his battles with Daredevil end in a draw.

Death-Stalker founds a new Unholy Three and has them kidnap Matt Murdock after learning of his secret identity as Daredevil. Daredevil is taken to St. Stephens Cemetery, where Death-Stalker kills two of the Unholy Three and attacks Daredevil. Unable to overcome Death-Stalker's abilities, Daredevil knocks out a nearby street light, thus enclosing the cemetery in darkness. Fighting blindly, Death-Stalker re-materializes while phasing through a tombstone, killing him instantly.

=== Death-Stalker (Villains for Hire) ===
A new Death-Stalker appears in the series Villains for Hire as a member of the eponymous group, a villainous counterpart of Heroes for Hire. She is among the villains hired by Purple Man to help him start his new criminal empire.

== Powers and abilities ==
Accidental exposure to an overdose of "t-radiation" altered Philip Sterling's physiology, making it so that he normally existed in a dimension congruent to Earth. While in this realm, he could observe events on Earth without being seen. By willing himself to do so, he could shift onto the physical plane, allowing him to become intangible and teleport. His "cybernetic death-grip" gloves, stolen from A.I.M., emit doses of microwave radiation that kill upon contact.

The second Death-Stalker can teleport and has a microwave "death grip".
