= Robert Gregory Browne =

American novelist

Robert Browne
- Born: 1955 (age 70–71); San Gabriel, California, U.S.
- Occupations: Novelist, screenwriter
- Writing career
- Period: 1990s–present
- Genres: Novels, television
- Website: robertgregorybrowne.com

Robert Gregory Browne (born 1955) is an American novelist, former screenwriter, and co-founder and creative director of Braun Haus Media, LLC.

== Early life ==
Browne was born in California, but at the age of eleven, moved with his family to Honolulu, Hawaii. After discovering the work of Donald Westlake, Browne set his sights on becoming a writer and at seventeen wrote 130 pages of a comedy mystery novel that remains unfinished. Browne tried writing speculative episodes of The Rockford Files and Harry O, among others, but none of these scripts were ever purchased and Browne shifted his interest to music.

== Hollywood ==
In 1990, Browne took up writing again and completed a feature-length screenplay, which was a winner in the Nicholl Fellowships in Screenwriting competition. The program is sponsored by the Academy of Motion Picture Arts & Sciences and is designed to give aspiring screenwriters a way into the film industry. Browne was one of five winners that year and received a twenty thousand dollar grant for his screenplay, Low Tide. Several weeks after winning, that screenplay sold to Showtime and was slated to be produced by the network. After two years of development, executives overseeing production left the network and the screenplay was put into turnaround.

Browne continued working in Hollywood for many years. In the late 1990s, he worked with producer-writer Larry Brody, and was hired by Saban/Fox Kids as a staff writer for the animated show, Diabolik, based on the famed Italian comic book. He and Brody later worked together on the Marvel production, Spider-Man Unlimited.

In 2010, CBS Television and Sony Pictures produced a television pilot based on Browne's novel, Kiss Her Goodbye. The pilot starred Dylan Walsh, Michael Rapaport, Sandrine Holt, and Terry Kinney, with a script written and directed by Michael Dinner.

== Career as a Novelist ==
In 2005, Browne's first novel, Kiss Her Goodbye, sold to St. Martin's Press. St. Martin's subsequently published three more novels, Whisper in the Dark (which received a starred review from Publishers Weekly), Kill Her Again, and Down Among the Dead Men. In 2011, Browne moved to Dutton Penguin, which released his apocalyptic supernatural thriller, The Paradise Prophecy. In 2012, Browne released a mystery thriller entitled Trial Junkies, which became an Amazon bestseller. 2013 brought two books: Trial Junkies 2: Negligence and Poe, co-written with Brett Battles, and later Takedown, a sequel to Poe. In 2015, Browne launched a new series Linger using the pen name Edward Fallon. Under his Braun Haus Media banner, Browne commissioned several authors to write further stories in the Linger series using the Fallon name, and wrote the seventh book himself.

== Published works ==
- Kiss Her Goodbye (St. Martin's, 2007; ISBN 978-0-312-35864-8)
- Whisper in the Dark (St. Martin's, 2009; ISBN 978-0-312-35866-2)
- Kill Her Again (St. Martin's, 2009; ISBN 978-0-312-94557-2)
- Killer Year: Stories to Die For edited by Lee Child Story: Bottom Deal (St. Martin's, 2008; ISBN 978-0-312-54524-6)
- Down Among the Dead Men (St. Martin's, 2010; ISBN 978-0-312-94558-9)
- The Paradise Prophecy (Dutton, 2011; ISBN 978-0-525-95223-7)
- Love is Murder edited by Sandra Brown Story: "Speechless" (Mira, 2012; ISBN 978-0-7783-1344-1)
- Trial Junkies (Braun Haus Media, 2012; ISBN 978-148-1-82773-7)
- Trial Junkies 2: Negligence (Braun Haus Media, 2013; ISBN 978-0-615-83806-9)
- Poe co-written with Brett Battles (Braun Haus Media, 2013; ISBN 978-1-483-98683-8)
- Takedown co-written with Brett Battles (Braun Haus Media, 2014; ISBN 978-1-4937-5998-9)
- Linger: Dying is a Wild Night (pen name Edward Fallon) (Braun Haus Media, 2015; ISBN 978-0-6924-3707-0)
- Linger 7: Journey of a Thousand Miles (pen name Edward Fallon) (Braun Haus Media, 2015; ISBN 978-1-5220-9190-5)
- Casting the Bones: An Author's Guide to the Craft of Fiction (Braun Haus Media, 2017; ISBN 978-1979559881)
- Double Negative (Braun Haus Media, 2021; ISBN 979-8766827146)
- A Measure of Darkness (Braun Haus Media, 2021; ISBN 979-8850402228)

== Interviews ==
- Liam Sweeny Interviews Robert Gregory Browne
- Interview with Robert Gregory Browne
- Write with Impact Interview
- Novels Alive Interview
- Robert Gregory Browne Answers the Usual Questions
- Storytelling and the Art of Composing
- Meet Robert Gregory Browne
- Interview with Robert Gregory Browne
- Writing Duo Battles and Browne
