= Ani-Men =

Marvel comic books

- The cover to X-Men #95, featuring the original Ani-Men fighting the X-Men. Art by Gil Kane and Dave Cockrum.

Publication information
- Publisher: Marvel Comics
- First appearance: Daredevil #10 (October 1965)
- Created by: Wally Wood; Bob Powell

In-story information
- Member(s): Membership

The Ani-Men is the name of several fictional teams appearing in American comic books published by Marvel Comics. Four of them are villain groups, while one of them was introduced as a team of agents serving the High Evolutionary.

== Publication history ==
The first Ani-Men debuted in Daredevil #10 (October 1965) and were created by Wally Wood (writer, co-artist) and Bob Powell (co-artist).

The second Ani-Men debuted in Daredevil #157 (March 1979) and were created by Roger McKenzie (co-writer), Jo Duffy (co-writer), Gene Colan (artist), and Klaus Janson (inker).

The third Ani-Men debuted in Scarlet Spider Unlimited #1 (November 1995) and were created by Glenn Herdling (writer), Todd Smith (artist), and John Nyberg (inker).

The fourth Ani-Men debuted in Code of Honor #3 (April 1997) and were created by Chuck Dixon (writer), Bob Wakelin (co-artist), and Dærick Gröss Sr. (co-artist).

The fifth Ani-Men debuted in GLA #1 (June 2005) and were created by Dan Slott (writer) and Paul Pelletier (artist).

== Fictional team history ==
=== Original Ani-Men ===
The original lineup of the Ani-Men (consisting of Ape-Man, Bird-Man, Cat-Man, and Frog-Man) are recruited by a man calling himself the Organizer, who gives them costumes themed after their codenames. The Organizer is secretly Abner Jonas, a candidate running to become mayor of New York City, and sends the Ani-Men to undermine the standing of the current administration. Daredevil defeats them and the Ani-Men and the Organizer are all imprisoned.

Count Nefaria has Ape-Man, Bird-Man, Cat-Man, Frog-Man, and new member Dragonfly be submitted to a processes at the hands of Dr. Kenneth Sturdy that gives them superhuman powers and animalistic appearances. Following an assault on the NORAD base at Mount Valhalla, they are all captured by the X-Men.

The Ani-Men, having returned to their normal forms, are sent to kill Tony Stark. However, they are killed by a bomb that Spymaster had intended to kill Stark with.

=== Death-Stalker's Ani-Men ===
Death-Stalker recruits a new team of Ani-Men and gives them the costumes of the original Ani-Men members. Death-Stalker sends the new Ani-Men to capture Daredevil. The Black Widow defeats Bird-Man, and the Death-Stalker kills Ape-Man and Cat-Man after the completion of their mission. Bird-Man survives, but is later killed by the Scourge of the Underworld.

=== High Evolutionary's Ani-Men ===
The third incarnation of the Ani-Men (also spelled Animen) are a group of New Men that consist of Buzzard (an evolved hawk), Crushtacean (an evolved crab), Flying Fox (an evolved bat), Komodo (an evolved Komodo dragon), and Spinneret (an evolved spider). The High Evolutionary dispatches the Ani-Men to a laboratory operated by his former assistant Mile Warren to clean up Warren's files. After three weeks, the Ani-Men are almost done with their cleanup and have spread a virus into all of Warren's files, but they are discovered by the Scarlet Spider. When the High Evolutionary teleports the Ani-Men back to his home base at Wundagore, the Scarlet Spider is accidentally brought with them, having stuck himself to Crushtacean with his webbing. Later, the Scarlet Spider joins members of the Cult of the Jackal in sneaking into the citadel of the High Evolutionary in an attempt to learn the truth about Warren's involvement with the High Evolutionary. The Ani-Men come to face the cult members and the Scarlet Spider, but the fight is brought to an end after the Scarlet Spider learns the truth from the High Evolutionary.

=== Hammerhead's Ani-Men ===
During the Secret Wars storyline, a new version of the Ani-Men (consisting of Ape-Man, Bird-Man, and Frog-Man) commit crimes while the heroes are on Battleworld. They obtain the equipment of the original Ani-Men and use it to rob a vault wagon, only to be opposed by the NYPD.

These Ani-Men (Ape-Man, Bird-Man, and a new Cat-Man) are among the many criminals hired by Hammerhead in an effort to take over the underworld while the Kingpin is incarcerated. Unknown to them, the Kingpin has tricked Iron Man into leading a S.H.I.E.L.D. unit to the warehouse where they are meeting, which Iron Man believes to be the headquarters of Captain America's Secret Avengers. Iron Man and the S.H.I.E.L.D. unit break in and a huge fight breaks out. The battle results in arrests, injuries and death, but it is unrevealed if any of those apply to the new Ani-Men.

=== Independent Ani-Men ===
This Ani-Men consists of anthropomorphic animals and has no known connection to any prior incarnations of the group. This group consists of Giraffe-Man, Great Horned Owl-Man, Pig-Man, and Rabbit-Woman. They attack the Milwaukee Convention Center, holding humans responsible for transgressions against the animal kingdom. Model Ashley Crawford (a.k.a. Big Bertha) is at a modeling shoot there and phones her teammates in the Great Lakes Avengers for help. By the time the Great Lakes Avengers show up, the actual Avengers have arrived to stop the Ani-Men.

== Membership ==
=== First Ani-Men ===
- Ape-Man (Gordon "Monk" Keefer) - A strong criminal who was previously defeated in a heist by Captain America. He wears an ape-like suit. He was killed by the Spymaster's bomb.
- Bird-Man (Henry Hawk) - A criminal who wears a bird-like suit. No other background traits available. He was killed by the Spymaster's bomb.
- Cat-Man (Towshend Horgan) - A criminal with "feline agility" who wears a cat-like suit. He was killed by the Spymaster's bomb.
- Frog-Man (François LeBlanc) - A criminal with Olympic-level leaping abilities who wears a frog-like suit. He was killed by the Spymaster's bomb.
- Dragonfly - A woman who possesses dragonfly-like abilities. The only surviving member of the original team.

=== Second Ani-Men ===
- Ape-Man (Roy McVey) - The second Ape-Man. He was killed by Death-Stalker after serving his purpose.
- Bird-Man (Achille DeBacco) - The second Bird-Man. While murdered by Scourge of the Underworld, he was later revived by the Hood, gaining a bird-like appearance.
- Cat-Man (Sebastian Patane) - The second Cat-Man. He was killed by Death-Stalker after serving his purpose.

=== High Evolutionary's Ani-Men ===
- Buzzard - An evolved hawk.
- Crushtacean - An evolved crab.
- Flying Fox - An evolved bat.
- Komodo - An evolved Komodo dragon.
- Spinneret - An evolved spider.

=== Hammerhead's Ani-Men ===
- Ape-Man - This Ape-Man opposed the NYPD during an armored car robbery and was also with the Ani-Men when they joined Hammerhead's gang.
- Bird-Man - This Bird-Man opposed the NYPD during an armored car robbery and was also with the Ani-Men when they joined Hammerhead's gang.
- Frog-Man - This Frog-Man opposed the NYPD during an armored car robbery.
- Cat-Man - This Cat-Man was with the Ani-Men when they joined Hammerhead's gang.

=== Independent Ani-Men ===
- Giraffe-Man - A humanoid giraffe.
- Great Horned Owl-Man - A humanoid great horned owl.
- Pig-Man - A humanoid pig.
- Rabbit-Woman - A humanoid rabbit.

== Other versions ==
=== Carnage: Black, White & Blood ===
An alternate universe iteration of the Ani-Men appears in Carnage: Black, White & Blood, consisting of Elephant Man, Giraffe Man, and Boar-Man. In a "You Are Carnage" story that evokes the traits of "Choose Your Own Adventure", the Ani-Men are either killed or incapacitated by Carnage depending on the reader's choice.

=== Earth X ===
An original incarnation of the Ani-Men appear in Earth X. These versions are animals from a Wakandan preserve who the Black Panther accidentally mutated into anthropomorphic forms using the Cosmic Cube. After the Wendigo attacks Wakanda, Black Panther brings the Ani-Men to live in the Savage Land.

=== Ultimate Marvel ===
An alternate universe incarnation of the Ani-Men from Earth-1610 appear in the Ultimate Marvel imprint. This version consists of mud creatures, who are associates of Arthur Molekevic.

== In other media ==
Flying Fox of the Ani-Men appears in Moon Girl and Devil Dinosaur, voiced by Sasheer Zamata.
