= The Old Order Changeth! =

Marvel Comics story

- Publisher: Marvel Comics
- Publication date: May 1965
- Genre: Superhero
- Title(s): The Avengers #16
- Main characters: Captain America; Iron Man; Hank Pym; Wasp; Thor; Hawkeye; Quicksilver; Scarlet Witch

Creative team
- Writer: Stan Lee
- Artist: Jack Kirby
- Penciller: Dick Ayers
- Inker: Dick Ayers
- Letterer: Artie Simek
- Editor: Stan Lee

"The Old Order Changeth!" is a superhero story in the Marvel Comics series The Avengers. Written by Stan Lee, illustrated by Jack Kirby and Dick Ayers, and lettered by Artie Simek, it was published in The Avengers #16 (cover dated May 1965). The story details the first major change in the team roster, in which the founding members Iron Man, Thor, Giant-Man, and the Wasp retire from the Avengers. They are replaced by three former villains: the criminal Hawkeye, and twin Brotherhood of Evil Mutants members Quicksilver and Scarlet Witch. Captain America remains as the only member from the earlier lineup. The new lineup became known as "Cap's Kooky Quartet."

"The Old Order Changeth!" was Lee's solution to the problem of keeping the Avengers consistent with the solo series of its members. The story's major theme is redemption, specifically whether former villains can be given a second chance.

The story has been revisited in several later comics, including Avengers #1.1, which retells the lineup change as a flashback.

== Plot ==
The issue opens with the Avengers facing the Masters of Evil, whose members included Melter, Black Knight, Executioner, and Enchantress. Thor creates a space warp which captures Melter and Black Knight, and Executioner and Enchantress escape. Meanwhile, Captain America and Rick Jones bury Heinrich Zemo and fight Zemo's mercenaries, who are attempting to take the jet plane Captain America and Jones plan to use. One of the mercenaries throws a grenade at Captain America, missing him but hitting the jet's tank instead. The mercenaries subsequently escape. Thor returns to Asgard to deal with the Trial of the Gods. Soon after, the team's founding members decide to disband the team to pursue normal lives.

Hawkeye, a foe of Iron Man, breaks into the Avengers Mansion where the team was present. He ties up the butler, Jarvis, states that he wishes to join the Avengers, and subsequently frees Jarvis with a trick shot. The departing members put out word for candidates to replace them. The team attempts to recruit Namor, but he declines, stating that he does not want to renounce his people's claim to the surface world. Quicksilver and Scarlet Witch, mutant twins who were reluctant members of the Brotherhood of Evil Mutants, read a newspaper article stating that the Avengers are seeking new applicants. Excited to join, Quicksilver notes that they can now use their powers for good with Magneto gone. He explains that he does not want to join the X-Men because he wishes to forget he is a mutant, believing the Avengers will accept them despite this difference.

The Avengers host a press conference announcing Hawkeye as the newest member of the team. Captain America saves a plantation worker from leopard; in gratitude, he drives Captain America and Jones to the seaport of Caruca, where they can find transportation back to the United States. Quicksilver and Scarlet Witch arrive in the United States, where Quicksilver demonstrates his superspeed to reporters who ask whether they will join the Avengers. Tony Stark, the secret identity of Iron Man, prepares Quicksilver and Scarlet Witch for their interview. Captain America and Jones return to Avengers Mansion, where Captain America is shocked to learn the team is breaking up. Iron Man then holds a press conference to introduce the new team. A happy reunion among the old comrades follows, until first Giant-Man leaves and then a somber Iron Man, who thinks that the mantle has been passed to a new and younger group and that the old must give way to the new.

== Creation and publication ==
By the mid 1960s, Lee had characters regularly appear in one another's series, keeping continuity consistent between titles. For instance, if Tony Stark went missing from Tales of Suspense, he was also absent from the next issue of The Avengers, and when the Hulk was captured in Tales to Astonish, Reed Richards wondered about his whereabouts in a Fantastic Four annual. The Avengers presented a unique challenge because its members also appeared in solo features.

Lee's solution was to change the team's lineup in #16. At that point, no superhero team in comic book history had gone through such a massive overhaul. Lee took a risk, as editors at the time assumed that readers would be upset if a title deviated too far from its normal status quo. Lee had Iron Man, Thor, Giant-Man, and the Wasp abruptly quit for their own reasons in the interest of suspense.

Lee wrote the script, Kirby with the layouts and the cover pencils, and Dick Ayers with the pencils and inks and the cover inks. Kirby and Ayers have the Avengers dispose of the Masters of Evil in the first four pages. Don Heck had been the regular Avengers artist since 1964, but he worked from Kirby layouts when Lee felt a feature needed a shot of dynamism or, in the case of #16, a promotional boost.

The issue is cover dated for May 1965. The story was later collected in The Essential Avengers, Volume 1 (2001), and Marvel Masterworks – The Avengers, Volume 2 (2010).

== Reception and legacy ==
Avengers #16 was a radical departure from the way comics were generally handled at the time, as the new members were "hardly big guns."

Jim Beard writes that the second Avengers lineup has been called "Cap's Kooky Quartet" both lovingly and mockingly, and that it hit with a huge impact despite a brief run of eleven issues. Mark Waid praised the team as plucky for rising to the occasion despite having huge shoes to fill, and named Captain America as his favorite member. The lineup lasted until Hank Pym returned, as Goliath, in #28.

Frank Martin argues that the roster change reduce the team's power and numbers, and argued a similar change would cause fan backlash today. He describes it as a key part of Avengers history that allowed the franchise to outgrow its original cast.
