= Bloodaxe (character) =

Marvel Comics fictional character

- Bloodaxe promotional artwork

Publication information
- Publisher: Marvel Comics
- First appearance: Thor #392 (Jun. 1988) (as Jackie Lukus); Thor #449 (Jul. 1992) (as Bloodaxe)
- Created by: Tom DeFalco; Pat Olliffe

In-story information
- Alter ego: Jackie Lukus
- Notable aliases: Executioner
- Abilities: Superhuman strength, speed, durability, reflexes and endurance Invulnerability to conventional firearms and incendiary or ballistic devices Wields enchanted and virtually indestructible axe

Bloodaxe (Jackie Lukus) is a supervillain appearing in American comic books published by Marvel Comics. The character is usually depicted as a foe of Thor and Thunderstrike. This character first appeared in Thor #449, though she did not adopt her name and appearance until #450. The name also applies to the axe used by this character.

Bloodaxe's identity was initially a mystery; all early panels of the character's alter ego were depicted as being concealed by shadow or as a silhouette. Due to the sheer muscular mass of Bloodaxe (a direct result of the Asgardian magic within the axe), it was also impossible to determine their gender. Many supporting cast members of Thunderstrike were hinted at being Bloodaxe, but many of them would turn out to be red herrings. It was only after Bloodaxe was defeated that they were revealed to be Jackie Lukus, a confidant and love interest of Thunderstrike's alias Eric Masterson.

== Fictional character biography ==
A figure in shadow discovers the axe once wielded by Skurge the Executioner. When they pick up the axe, they are transformed by its magic into a superhuman being. As Bloodaxe, they battle the police and kill drug dealers.

Bloodaxe first battles Eric Masterson, who had been using the identity of Thor. When the real Thor returns, Masterson becomes Thunderstrike and battles Bloodaxe again. Bloodaxe first encounters Thunderstrike when they arrive to kill the low-level villain Carjack and his gang. Thunderstrike thwarts Bloodaxe and takes custody of the axe. Bloodaxe is revealed to be Jackie Lukus, Eric Masterson's confidant and love interest.

Thunderstrike later utilizes Executioner's axe to defeat Set. After Set is destroyed, Thunderstrike is possessed by the axe's curse. As no one is able to stop his rampage, Thunderstrikes sacrifices himself to permanently destroy the axe.

The axe reappears during Dan Jurgens' Thor run, where Thor utilizes it in conjunction with Mjolnir. Thor later destroys the axe after he feels its curse beginning to affect him.

== Powers and abilities ==
By wielding the Executioner's enchanted Asgardian axe, its wielder is transformed into the superhuman Bloodaxe, increasing the wielder's size and mass while flooding the body with magical energy. Bloodaxe was endowed with superhuman strength, speed, durability, reflexes, and endurance by enchantments on the axe. The evil that remained within the axe also takes partial possession of the wielder's mind, warping its personality and making it murderously aggressive, overpowering its rationality with a lust for combat, vengeance, and bloodshed. Bloodaxe was invulnerable to conventional firearms, and incendiary or ballistic devices.

Bloodaxe's double-bladed axe was mystically enchanted and virtually indestructible, and can be used to deflect bullets. Thanks to enchantments from the Enchantress, the axe had the magical ability to create dimensional rifts. It could be used to teleport to places the wielder has previously been, project fire or ice energy, concussive bolts of Asgardian mystical force, and hurricane winds. However, if the user was separated from the axe for more than 60 seconds, they would lose their enchanted form and revert to their original mortal identity, much like the enchantment once placed on Mjolnir by Odin.

== Other versions ==
Bloodaxe is the name of a Spider-Man 2099 villain who also calls himself Bloodmace, Bloodsword and Bloodhammer, depending on the weapon he wields.
