= Quicksilver (Marvel Comics) =

Marvel Comics character

Pietro Maximoff Quicksilver
- Quicksilver taken from the cover of Scarlet Witch & Quicksilver #1 (February 2024). Art by Russell Dauterman.

Publication information
- Publisher: Marvel Comics
- First appearance: The X-Men #4 (March 1964)
- Created by: Stan Lee; Jack Kirby

In-story information
- Full name: Pietro Django Maximoff
- Species: Human mutant (originally); Human mutate (Note: In Marvel Comics, the term "mutate" is used as a noun to designate characters that received superpowers from an external source, as opposed to Marvel's mutants.) (retconned)
- Place of origin: Mount Wundagore, Transia (originally); Serbia (retconned)
- Team affiliations: Avengers; Brotherhood of Mutants; Inhumans; X-Factor; X-Men
- Partnerships: Scarlet Witch
- Notable aliases: Quicksilver; Pietro Frank; Mateo Maximoff
- Abilities: Superhuman speed, agility, stamina, reaction and reflexes; Eidetic memory; Rapid healing; Creation of high speed winds and tornadoes; Time manipulation

Quicksilver is a character appearing in American comic books published by Marvel Comics. Created by artist Jack Kirby and writer Stan Lee, the character first appeared in The X-Men #4 (cover dated March 1964). Introduced as an antagonist in Magneto's Brotherhood of Evil Mutants alongside his twin sister, Scarlet Witch, Quicksilver later reformed and joined the Avengers beginning with The Avengers #16 (May 1965), becoming part of the team's second generation.

Quicksilver is the superhero persona of Pietro Maximoff, a Romani speedster capable of moving and thinking at extreme speeds. Long portrayed as the mutant son of Magneto, he was formerly married to Crystal of the Inhuman Royal Family, with whom he has a daughter, Luna. A later retcon established that he and his sister were not Magneto's children or mutants, but ordinary children artificially empowered by the High Evolutionary. Through Wanda, Pietro is also the uncle of the twin superheroes Wiccan and Speed, the latter of whom takes after Pietro strongly in terms of both his powers and physical appearance. Pietro and Wanda have been listed as among the most visible Romani characters in mainstream superhero comics.

Major Quicksilver stories include writer Peter David's run on X-Factor vol. 1 (1991–1993), which interpreted Pietro's irritability as a psychological consequence of living at superspeed. Other storylines include "Bloodties" (1993), "House of M" (2005) and the subsequent Son of M miniseries (2006), and Quicksilver: No Surrender (2018).

The character has appeared in a range of movie, television, and video game adaptations. Two separate live-action versions of Quicksilver were adapted by two different film studios, as a result of a rights dispute between Marvel and 20th Century Fox: Aaron Taylor-Johnson portrayed the character in the Marvel Cinematic Universe (MCU) films Captain America: The Winter Soldier (2014) and Avengers: Age of Ultron (2015), while Evan Peters portrayed the character in the X-Men film series by 20th Century Fox.

== Publication history ==
=== Early years and 1970s ===
Quicksilver first appeared in The X-Men #4 (March 1964) and was created by writer Stan Lee and artist/co-writer Jack Kirby. In that issue, the character voices a theme central to the broader social undertones of the series, declaring of humanity: "Why should we love homo sapiens?? They hate us—fear us because of our superior power!". Scholars have noted that while such thematic seeds were present in the early Lee–Kirby run, they would not fully take root in the X-Men franchise until the mid-1970s, when a more diverse international cast brought questions of prejudice and belonging to the foreground. Both Kirby and Lee had stepped away from The X-Men by issue #20, but scholar Joseph Darowski argues that their work established Quicksilver as one of the few characters in the early run who directly engaged with the social tensions that scholars have since identified as central to the franchise's later development.

The character initially appears as an antagonist to the X-Men as a member of Magneto's Brotherhood of Evil Mutants, though he and his twin sister Scarlet Witch are depicted from the outset as reluctant participants rather than committed villains. Within this early antagonist role, Pietro's traits of a volatile temper, a protectiveness toward his sister, and a friction with authority were established in these early issues and recurred across decades of stories.

Quicksilver and Scarlet Witch reformed and joined the Avengers beginning with The Avengers #16 in May 1965, becoming part of the team's second generation alongside Captain America and Hawkeye. Despite this prominent placement, Quicksilver was editorially marginalised within the Avengers line during the early 1970s. A 1972 internal Marvel Comics memo, later made public by comics historian Sean Howe, ranked the company's characters by importance. Quicksilver was the only superhero on the entire list to receive the lowest ranking ("not as important"); the other characters who got it were two western characters (Ringo Kid and Western Ghost Rider) and a background figure (The Watcher).

=== 1980s and 1990s ===
Quicksilver's marriage to Crystal of the Inhumans and the birth of their daughter Luna became significant developments in the character's history, tying him into the Fantastic Four and the Inhuman Royal Family. The wedding was constructed across two titles: in The Avengers #127, by writer Steve Englehart and artists Sal Buscema and Joe Staton, the Avengers learned of the impending ceremony only when Gorgon of the Inhumans arrived to ask why they had not been preparing for it. The ceremony itself was depicted in Fantastic Four #150 by writer Gerry Conway and penciler Rich Buckler, where a threat engineered by the Inhuman Maximus the Mad working alongside Omega (revealed to be Ultron-7) was resolved when Franklin Richards awoke from a long coma and defeated the conspirators, after which the wedding took place with Black Bolt walking Crystal down the aisle. The birth of their daughter Luna further embedded Pietro within the Inhuman Royal Family.

Writer Steve Englehart, who had previously worked on the character in Avengers, was by his own account never a fan of Quicksilver as a superhero and felt the character was more naturally suited to villainy. Englehart engineered a deliberate and extended heel turn across Vision and the Scarlet Witch, the two Avengers annuals, and West Coast Avengers, in which Pietro (driven to instability by Crystal's infidelity) framed the Avengers for treason and attempted to murder former allies. The reversal of this arc was handled largely by other writers: Jo Duffy's X-Factor Annual #2 established that Pietro had been psychically driven to villainy by Maximus the Mad, and a subsequent Fantastic Four Annual story confirmed he had been neurologically restored, allowing the character to return to heroic status.

From 1991 to 1993 Quicksilver was a regular character in the first volume of X-Factor. When assembling his cast, writer Peter David specifically sought access to Pietro, viewing him as a character with a justified sense of arrogance and a natural capacity to generate friction within a team dynamic. The interpretation David developed was also a deliberate departure from how superspeed had typically been written: where other writers, such as Mark Gruenwald in D.P. 7 or the creative teams on The Flash, had focused on superspeed as a physical phenomenon, David was specifically interested in its mental dimension: the consequence of a mind operating faster than the world around it. He characterized Quicksilver's chronic irritability as a natural psychological result of this accelerated perception, arguing that living in a world moving in slow motion would make one feel "very superior... and very impatient with everyone." Pietro's ambiguous commitment to the team was shown in small details: he declined to wear X-Factor's uniform (a fact noticed and remarked upon by the press in issue #72) and his standing as a genuine member was difficult to parse in the run's early issues. Throughout, David depicted Pietro wrestling with his identity as a superhuman and a hero, with his marriage deteriorating alongside his struggle to function at the pace of an ordinary life. By issue #87, a therapy session made explicit what the run had been building toward: that Pietro needed to slow down and step away from his fast-paced, action-packed lifestyle to focus on what was truly important. David also depicted him practicing deliberate slow-motion exercises as attempts to manage his condition.

Quicksilver starred in Quicksilver, a regular ongoing eponymous series that began in November 1997 and ran for 13 issues. The series was created by writer Tom Peyer, with John Ostrander later taking over scripting duties. Both writers centered the book on Quicksilver's reluctant role as leader of the Knights of Wundagore, an elite group of the High Evolutionary's genetically altered New Men, placing the characteristically impatient and headstrong Pietro in a situation requiring sustained commitment and leadership. Its focus on Quicksilver's strained marriage and his team's wavering confidence in his leadership gave it a degree of character depth noted by contemporary reviewers.

=== 2000s-2020s ===
Pietro served as the primary instigator of the reality-warping of the "House of M" event. By exploiting his sister's dissociative mental state and her grief over her lost children, he pressured Wanda into reshaping the world into one where mutants were the dominant species, framing the manipulation as an act of familial love and warning that refusal would cost Wanda her life. When Magneto discovered Pietro's role in orchestrating the event, he killed his son in a rage, though Pietro was resurrected when Wanda retaliated by stripping the majority of mutants of their powers, including Pietro himself. The subsequent Son of M miniseries followed Pietro's desperate attempts to reclaim his abilities through exposure to the Inhuman Terrigen Mist, a storyline that introduced new time-manipulation powers before eventually leaving him powerless again. Peter David, who later wrote the character in X-Factor: The Quick and the Dead and All-New X-Factor, described his approach to the post-"House of M" Pietro as wanting to take the character to "absolute rock bottom" before exploring what remained.

Quicksilver appeared as a supporting character in Avengers Academy from issue #1 (August 2010) through its final issue #39 (January 2013), joining the teaching staff in part to distance himself from his father's legacy and eventually making a public confession of his past actions. He subsequently appeared as one of the members of All-New X-Factor, launched in 2014 as part of the second Marvel NOW! wave, with Peter David's handling of the character earning a 2014 @ssie award from Ain't It Cool News.

In December 2014's Avengers and X-Men: Axis #7, by Rick Remender and Adam Kubert, a spell cast by Scarlet Witch, who in the event had been inverted to villainy by a spell cast by Doctor Doom, revealed that Magneto was not the biological father of Wanda or Pietro. This was followed by Uncanny Avengers #4 (May 2015), in which Remender and artist Daniel Acuña further revealed that the twins were not mutants at all, but rather ordinary children whose powers had been artificially induced through experimentation by the High Evolutionary. The timing of the changes, coinciding with the characters' introduction to the Marvel Cinematic Universe in Avengers: Age of Ultron (2015), where they similarly lack mutant origins or any connection to Magneto, a character whose film rights were then held by 20th Century Fox, led commentators to speculate that the comics retcon was motivated by synergy with the Marvel Cinematic Universe. The revision drew sustained criticism from comics commentators, who argued that the twins' status as Magneto's mutant children was integral to their characterization and called for the retcon to be reversed.

In 2018, writer Saladin Ahmed and artist Eric Nguyen launched Quicksilver: No Surrender, a five-issue miniseries spinning out of the Avengers: No Surrender storyline. Ahmed described his creative approach as a conscious reframing of Pietro's longstanding characterization: where Peter David had interpreted the character's abrasiveness as contempt bred by living at superspeed in a slower world, Ahmed approached it as anxiety, drawing on his own experience of the condition to portray Pietro as a man whose powers had instilled not arrogance but fear of other people. Ahmed also identified Pietro's Romani heritage and working-class origins as underexplored dimensions of the character, noting the contrast between Pietro's impoverished background and his eventual status as an Avenger as a source of tension largely neglected in prior stories. The series was designed as a deliberately introspective solo work, stripping the character of his usual team context to examine his inner life in isolation.

In 2024, writer Steve Orlando and artist Lorenzo Tammetta launched Scarlet Witch & Quicksilver, a four-issue miniseries released on February 14, 2024, coinciding with the characters' 60th anniversary. Orlando, who had previously written Wanda in her solo Scarlet Witch series, centered the book on the twins' sibling dynamic, describing their relationship as one where each knows how to provoke the other better than anyone else. The series pits Wanda and Pietro against the Wizard and his Frightful Four Hundred, with the arrival of a letter containing Magneto's last wishes serving as an additional source of tension between them. Orlando notes that while Wanda had previously shown willingness to move on from their complicated history with Magneto, Pietro had been considerably less so, particularly given that Magneto had killed him after "House of M". Orlando also described the series as an opportunity to explore Pietro's powers in new ways, with Tammetta bringing what Orlando called a hyperkinetic energy to depicting superspeed on the page. Quicksilver appears in the series Uncanny X-Men by Gail Simone beginning with issue #29, where he becomes the leader of the Louisiana X-Men team alongside Monet St. Croix.

== Characterization ==
=== Fictional character biography ===
Pietro Django Maximoff and his twin sister Wanda were raised by Django and Marya Maximoff, a Romani couple, until the manifestation of their powers led to their persecution by the local community, who viewed them as demons. Magneto, then recruiting for his Brotherhood of Evil Mutants, found them during this period of wandering in Central Europe.

Pietro and Wanda join Magneto's Brotherhood of Evil Mutants out of obligation since Magneto had saved Wanda's life from an anti-mutant mob, and the twins swore their allegiance to his cause in gratitude. Pietro possesses superhuman speed and Wanda the ability to control probability. After several confrontations with the X-Men, the siblings reform and join the Avengers alongside Captain America and Hawkeye, becoming the second generation of the team. Pietro initially clashes with his teammates and believes he should lead, but the twins eventually become loyal members until Wanda is wounded on a mission and Pietro leaves with her. After concluding that Magneto's goals conflict with their own, they return to the Avengers. When Wanda falls in love with the Vision, Quicksilver is disapproving and this causes a rift between them.

Quicksilver as shown on the cover of Avengers vol. 1, #75 (April 1970). Art by John Buscema and Tom Palmer. Before this appearance, his costume was green but otherwise the same.

During a later mission, Quicksilver is wounded by a Sentinel and nursed back to health by Crystal of the Inhumans, angering Crystal's former boyfriend Human Torch. Pietro announces his engagement to Crystal shortly after, though the relationship with his sister Wanda becomes strained over her continued romance with the Vision. The couple marry after a crisis engineered by Maximus the Mad and his ally Ultron-7 is resolved at their wedding, with Black Bolt walking Crystal down the aisle. The siblings also briefly encounter Robert Frank, a World War II hero who believes he is their biological father, though they later learn from the genetically engineered Bova at Mount Wundagore that Django Maximoff is in fact their true father. Crystal and Quicksilver have a daughter, Luna. Later still, Magneto forces the revelation that he is Pietro and Wanda's biological father, a claim both twins reject. Pietro's marriage deteriorates when Crystal has an affair, and his mental stability is later shattered when Maximus uses technology to make him psychotic, driving him to frame the Avengers for treason before the Vision brings him back to reason.

After being captured and cured by the Inhumans, Pietro joins the government-sponsored X-Factor after arriving at their Washington D.C. headquarters in a state of collapse, seeking help with what appeared to be a fatal deterioration of his mutant powers; a condition later revealed to be stress-related. His commitment to the team is initially ambiguous; he declines to wear its uniform and undergoes therapy to address the psychological toll of living at superhuman speed in a slower world. His marriage continues to deteriorate, and a counseling session ultimately leads him to recognize he must slow down and attend to what is most important in his life. He later resigns from X-Factor after his daughter Luna is kidnapped to Genosha, prompting a joint X-Men and Avengers rescue mission during which Pietro is nearly killed by Exodus. He recuperates alongside the Avengers and briefly reconciles with Crystal, before subsequently learning of Crystal's relationship with Black Knight, which strains the marriage.

Pietro also appears in Marvel vs. DC #2, where he faces the Flash in a battle scripted by Peter David, ultimately losing after hesitating to press an advantage against the weakened opponent. Quicksilver appears in JLA/Avengers. When he and the other Avengers go to the DC Universe, he becomes fascinated with the Speed Force and becomes a rival of the Flash, seeking to steal his powers.

Quicksilver plays a notable role in the "House of M" event, convincing his mentally unstable sister to warp reality into a world where mutants are the majority. When Magneto discovers Pietro is responsible, he kills him in a rage, though reality is restored and Pietro resurrected when Wanda retaliates by stripping 98% of mutants of their powers; including Pietro. Desperate to regain his abilities, Quicksilver secretly exposes himself to the Inhuman Terrigen Mist and embeds Terrigen crystals in his body, gaining new time-jumping powers. The subsequent Son of M miniseries, written by David Hine with art by Roy Allan Martinez, follows Pietro's desperate attempts to restore the abilities of depowered mutants through further exposure to the crystals, a process that proves typically fatal to those who receive it. Crystal, furious at his action, announces their marriage to be over. The crystals are eventually removed by Rictor, leaving him powerless again, until he inexplicably and spontaneously recovers his super speed.

Quicksilver later falls under the sway of Elder God Chthon, his spirit trapped in the Darkhold, before being freed by the Avengers and restored to his own body. He is subsequently offered a place on Hank Pym's Mighty Avengers, initially declining before accepting upon learning that the Scarlet Witch has joined the team; a figure who proves to be Loki in disguise. Once Pietro discovers the deception, he leaves the team. He is subsequently publicly exonerated of past crimes when a Skrull impostor is blamed, though his daughter Luna loses respect for him over the lie. He joins the teaching staff of Avengers Academy to distance himself from his father's legacy, where he bonds particularly with the student Finesse, who is aware that Pietro was never genuinely replaced by a Skrull and uses this knowledge as leverage to get him to train her in the same manner that Magneto once trained Pietro himself. He eventually makes a public confession of his past actions, reconciling with Luna. He subsequently appears as a member of All-New X-Factor, ostensibly following a falling-out with the Avengers, though in truth he has been sent by Havok to spy on Polaris and ensure her safety. Pietro remains on the team even after Havok declares the mission complete, and eventually departs when Polaris discovers the deception.

A later encounter with the High Evolutionary on Counter-Earth reveals that Pietro and Wanda are not mutants at all; they are the long-deceased children of Django and Marya Maximoff, Anna and Mateo, and were experimented upon by the High Evolutionary. During this period, while serving with the Avengers Unity Squad alongside his sister, Pietro also develops feelings for his teammate Synapse, though his recklessness ultimately leads to her injury at the hands of the Juggernaut.

During the second Civil War, Pietro and Wanda clash over which side to support and have a bitter falling out, though they later reconcile after defeating a physical manifestation of Chaos together and Pietro briefly meets his biological mother Natalya before she sacrifices herself. He joins the Underground resistance against Hydra during "Secret Empire", and later seemingly dies pushing himself to his limits during the Avengers' battle in the Grandmaster and Challenger's cosmic conflict, however it was revealed he was trapped in an alternate dimension before ultimately freeing himself and returning to the team. In Empyre, Quicksilver, Mockingbird, and Wonder Man deal with the Kree and the Skrull's fight with the Cotati near Navojoa. When Quicksilver is hit by special spheres fired by the Cotati magicians, Mockingbird and Wonder Man come to his aid and help the Kree and the Skrull turn the tide against the Cotati. Quicksilver recovers his stamina and uses his superspeed to break up the fight and dispose of the Kree and Skrull weapons in the Gulf of California. When the Scarlet Witch is apparently murdered at the Hellfire Gala, Pietro arrives at Krakoa and attacks Magneto in a rage, coming close to killing him before being restrained by Northstar. After being pulled away, Pietro chooses to grieve by drinking with Toad and other former Brotherhood of Evil Mutants members in Wanda's honor. In Blood Hunt, Quicksilver assists Captain America's branch of the Avengers in battling the vampires' invasion of Earth.

=== Powers and abilities ===
Quicksilver is typically depicted as a speedster with the ability to move and think at superhuman speeds, at times exceeding the speed of sound and, in some stories, approaching the speed of light. Exposure to the High Evolutionary's Isotope E was used by writers to raise his upper limit to roughly Mach 10, while also explaining his resistance to the physical consequences of such velocity: friction, oxygen deprivation, and kinetic impact. His accelerated metabolism allows him to heal faster than an ordinary person, and his speed enables feats such as generating cyclone-force winds and running vertically up surfaces or across water. Writers have also portrayed his mind as operating at a corresponding pace, granting him photographic short-term memory and reflexes beyond those of other superpowered characters.

After his mutant abilities were removed, he gained a distinct set of powers through exposure to the Inhumans' Terrigen Mist, allowing him to displace himself out of conventional time and space, briefly inhabit the future, and summon time-displaced versions of himself. By embedding fragments of Terrigen Crystals directly into his body, he was also able to restore superhuman abilities to depowered mutants, though the process was typically fatal to those who received it. These crystals were eventually expelled from his body, and the powers they granted were lost. His original speed was subsequently restored.

=== Personality and motivations ===
From his initial appearances as a reluctant member of the Brotherhood of Evil Mutants, Pietro was written with a volatile temper, an intense protectiveness toward his sister Wanda, and a persistent friction with authority figures. These traits have recurred across Pietro's publication history, even as the specific interpretation of their cause has shifted.

Where Wanda would have preferred to retire from heroics entirely and live in obscurity, Pietro actively sought out the team so he could use his powers without persecution, taking the scientific designation for mutants "Homo superior" to heart. Mark D. White draws on Aristotelian ethics to frame Pietro's persistent instability, distinguishing between a truly virtuous person, who takes genuine pleasure in doing right, and a continent one, who does the right thing but finds it burdensome and may stumble under sufficient pressure. Pietro, by this reading, is continent rather than virtuous; his difficult history makes it hard for him to take real satisfaction in heroism, which accounts for his recurring pattern of abandoning or betraying the Avengers when circumstances become sufficiently extreme.

Have you ever stood in line at a banking machine behind a person who didn't know how to use it?... Now, imagine, Doctor, that everyone you work with, everywhere you go, your entire world is filled with people who can't work cash machines.

— Quicksilver, X-Factor #87: "The X-Amination". Marvel Comics.

The character's superspeed underlies a personality interpretation that multiple writers have returned to across several decades. Writer Peter David developed the idea that Pietro's chronic irritability and abrasiveness were natural psychological consequences of his perception; that living in a world moving in slow motion around him would breed profound impatience. David depicted the character undergoing therapy and practicing deliberate slow-motion exercises as attempts to manage this condition. A later reinterpretation by writer Saladin Ahmed reframed the same premise differently, drawing on personal experience to portray Pietro's accelerated existence as a source of anxiety rather than superiority; describing a man whose powers had made the world feel overwhelming.

== Reception ==
=== Critical response ===
Critical and fan rankings have consistently placed Quicksilver among the top speedsters in comics. Screen Rant, CBR, and Collider have each ranked him in their lists of the fastest superheroes and speedsters in comics and the Marvel Universe specifically, with placements ranging from third to tenth across publications and years. His standing in broader character rankings is more modest: IGN placed him 23rd among X-Men in 2006 and 44th among Avengers in 2012, while The A.V. Club ranked him 71st in their 2022 list of the best Marvel characters overall. CBR included Quicksilver in their list of the ten scariest Avengers in 2022, citing his history of villainy.

The revelation in WandaVision (2021) that Evan Peters' character was not a genuine version of Pietro Maximoff but rather a brainwashed civilian generated significant fan backlash, with the hashtag #SaveQuicksilver trending on Twitter for several days following the season finale. Fan response divided between those seeking the return of Aaron Taylor-Johnson's MCU version and those arguing that Peters' Fox portrayal deserved to be incorporated into the broader Marvel universe.

=== Romani heritage ===
Although Quicksilver and Scarlet Witch's first origin story established them as the children of American superheroes Whizzer and Miss America, this origin was abandoned when they received a new and more substantial origin story in The Avengers #181–187 (1978–79), in which writer David Michelinie introduced Django Maximoff as the character who identifies himself as having been the shaman of a nomadic Romani tribe in Central Europe, and recounts how antigypsyist violence, including mob attacks on the camp and discrimination that made employment impossible, forced him to steal to survive, ultimately resulting in the loss of the twins during a pogrom. Academic analysis of this arc has identified it as more humanizing in its treatment of Romani persecution than earlier Marvel comics with Roma-coded characters, in part because it introduces themes of systemic racism and psychological trauma alongside the more conventional elements of the "Gypsy" motif, though it still relies on stereotypical imagery and at points implies the victims' own unlawful behaviour was partly responsible for the violence against them. The arc is credited with establishing a wave of Romani-coded superheroes in subsequent American comics, and Romani activists and organizations have cited Pietro and Wanda Maximoff, alongside characters like Doctor Doom and Magneto, as figures who have served as sources of identification and empowerment for Roma youth.

The characters' Romani identity has been engaged with inconsistently by writers across their publication history. The most explicit engagement came in Saladin Ahmed's 2018 miniseries Quicksilver: No Surrender, in which Ahmed identified Pietro's Romani background as one of the most neglected dimensions of the character, noting that he wanted to dig into questions of where the character came from and how his community was treated, as a way of gaining insight into who Pietro is.

The retcon introduced in Avengers and X-Men: Axis #7 (2014) and Uncanny Avengers #4 (2015), which severed Pietro and Wanda's connection to Magneto and established them as non-mutants, drew criticism on multiple grounds. Commentators noted that in recent years these characters have been effectively stripped of their Roma identity, and argued that their ethnic background was integral to understanding them; the persecution and trauma faced by the Romani informing their stories in ways that a simple change of parentage does not resolve.

The live-action adaptations have been criticized for omitting the characters' Romani heritage entirely. In the Marvel Cinematic Universe, Pietro and Wanda Maximoff are depicted as citizens of the fictional nation of Sokovia, with no reference to their minority background. Scholarly analysis has described the film as having changed the twins into generic Eastern Europeans, characterizing this as a missed opportunity to give Jewish and Romani characters a significant role in a major Marvel film, and noting that the studio rights situation, which required MCU filmmakers to avoid explicitly identifying the characters as mutants or as Magneto's children, partly accounts for the change. The Fox films similarly make no reference to Romani heritage. Commentators have described both sets of adaptations as missed opportunities to offer meaningful representation of a community that is rarely visible in mainstream media and that has faced, and continues to face, severe discrimination across Europe.

== Supporting characters ==
=== Allies ===
Pietro's central relationship throughout his publication history is with his twin sister, Wanda Maximoff, the Scarlet Witch. The two were raised together by Django and Marya Maximoff, a Romani couple, and entered Magneto's Brotherhood of Evil Mutants together before reforming and joining the Avengers as a unit. Pietro's fierce protectiveness of Wanda has been a defining trait since their first appearance. His manipulation of her dissociative state during House of M, framed by Pietro as an act of familial love, is described by Marvel's own editorial commentary as the point at which his influence over his sister played out 'at its most destructive.' Writer Steve Orlando, in the 2024 Scarlet Witch & Quicksilver miniseries, framed the twins as symbolic counterparts (Wanda representing magic, Pietro representing science), describing their relationship as one in which each sibling knows precisely how to provoke the other.

Pietro's psychology is examined during his membership in the government-sponsored X-Factor, written by Peter David from 1991 to 1993. David had specifically sought access to Pietro because he wanted a persistent source of friction, and the contrast between Pietro's abrasiveness and the relative levity of characters like Multiple Man and Strong Guy gave the dynamic a range that reviewers have noted was largely absent from his Avengers appearances. Havok's position as team leader placed him in a relationship of authority over Pietro that was by definition unstable, and the run used these tensions to explore Pietro's psychological interior in ways that proved influential on later writers.

=== Romantic interests ===
Pietro's most sustained romantic arc in the comics involved Crystal of the Inhumans, whom he met when she nursed him back to health following injuries sustained on a mission. Their marriage, which took place in Fantastic Four #150 following a crisis engineered by Maximus the Mad and his ally Ultron-7, embedded Pietro within the Inhuman Royal Family and redirected his storylines toward that corner of the Marvel Universe for an extended period. Crystal and Pietro have a daughter, Luna, whose own arc across several decades of stories, culminating in her reconciliation with Pietro during his time on the Avengers Academy teaching staff, has served as one of the more sustained measures of his personal failures and growth. The marriage deteriorated when Crystal had an affair, an event writer Steve Englehart used as the catalyst for Pietro's extended villainous turn in the late 1980s. Crystal declared it definitively over following Pietro's unauthorized exposure to the Terrigen Mist in the aftermath of House of M.

In recent years, Quicksilver has had relationships with Synapse and Monet St. Croix.

=== Villains ===
For the majority of Quicksilver's publication history, Magneto was depicted as his biological father, a revelation that added considerable complexity to Pietro's early antagonist role: he and Wanda had joined the Brotherhood out of obligation, not ideological conviction, and the later disclosure of their parentage recast that period in a darker light. Pietro's relationship with Magneto has been consistently adversarial even within the familial framing; Magneto killed Pietro in a rage upon learning of his role in the House of M event. The retcon introduced in Avengers and X-Men: Axis #7 (2014) and Uncanny Avengers #4 (2015) severed the biological connection entirely, establishing that neither Pietro nor Wanda are Magneto's children or mutants. The revision proved contentious among readers, many of whom regarded the father–son tension as integral to Pietro's characterization, and debate over whether the retcon should be reversed has continued in subsequent years.

=== Alternate versions ===
Alternate versions of Quicksilver exist across Marvel's multiverse. In Marvel Zombies, a zombified version of the character from Earth-2149 makes an appearance, while Marvel 1602 features an Earth-311 counterpart named Petros, who serves as Enrique's assistant within the Spanish Catholic Church. X-Men Noir presents yet another variant, Peter Magnus of Earth-90214, depicted as a detective and former college track runner. In the What If? story "What If the X-Men Died on their First Mission?", Quicksilver and Scarlet Witch appear as allies of Beast against Count Nefaria and his Ani-Men, though both decline an invitation to join the newly formed team.

In the Ultimate Marvel universe, Quicksilver is depicted as Pietro Lensherr, the son of Magneto, who is capable of reaching Mach 10 speeds as a teenager and spends much of his early life in the Savage Land. After he and his sister Wanda defect from their father's Brotherhood of Mutant Supremacy, they join the Ultimates in exchange for amnesty. Pietro later watches over his imprisoned father at the Triskelion and threatens to kill him, before recruiting new Brotherhood members including Mystique, Sabretooth, and Teddy. Following the restoration of the multiverse after the "Secret Wars" storyline, Pietro is brainwashed by geneticist Miss Sinister alongside other mutants and deployed as one of her enforcers, the New Marauders, bringing them into conflict with the time-displaced original X-Men. He later dies after being subjected to experimentation involving Mothervine. The Ultimate versions of Pietro and Wanda were also depicted with an unusually close sibling bond that writer Mark Millar left ambiguous across Ultimate X-Men and The Ultimates, but which writer Jeph Loeb made explicit as incestuous in Ultimates 3. The decision was criticized by commentators as an ill-conceived escalation of something that had been, at most, only implicit in prior stories.

== In other media ==
=== Television ===
Quicksilver has appeared in several Marvel animated television series. He appears in The Marvel Super Heroes, voiced by Len Carlson, as a member of the Avengers. In X-Men: The Animated Series he is voiced by Adrian Egan and Paul Haddad as a member of X-Factor, while in X-Men: Evolution he is voiced by Richard Ian Cox as a teenage member of the Brotherhood of Bayville; a future vision in that series' finale depicts him having reformed and joined S.H.I.E.L.D. He appears in Wolverine and the X-Men, voiced by Mark Hildreth, as leader of the Brotherhood of Mutants and a resident of Genosha, and in The Super Hero Squad Show, voiced by Scott Menville, where he and Scarlet Witch turn against Magneto after being offered friendship by the Falcon.

=== Film ===
Marvel licensed the filming rights of the X-Men and related concepts (such as mutants) to 20th Century Fox in 1994, after an animated X-Men television series for Fox Kids demonstrated the franchise's commercial appeal to producer Lauren Shuler Donner. Years later, Marvel started their own film franchise, the Marvel Cinematic Universe (MCU), which focused on characters that had not been licensed to other studios. As a result, Quicksilver and Scarlet Witch became part of a rights dispute between the two studios, with Fox citing the pair's status as mutants and children of Magneto, and Marvel citing their closer editorial association with the Avengers. The two studios eventually reached an agreement allowing each to use the characters, so long as Fox did not reference them as Avengers and Marvel did not identify them as mutants or as Magneto's children. The arrangement became moot following Disney's acquisition of 21st Century Fox and the subsequent transfer of all X-Men-related characters to Marvel Studios.

==== 20th Century Fox films ====
In May 2013, director Bryan Singer announced that Evan Peters had been cast as the character, renamed Peter Maximoff, in X-Men: Days of Future Past. Costume designer Louise Mingenbach, who drew heavily from 1970s styles for most of the clothing seen in the film's 1973 scenes, dressed Peters in 1981-inspired clothing as a way of conveying the character's irreverence for the precise time and place he inhabits. To depict Maximoff's speed, Singer filmed all of the character's scenes at 3,600 frames per second. The visual effects studio Rising Sun Pictures created the film's central kitchen sequence, in which Maximoff disarms a room of security guards, by conducting a LIDAR scan of the set and constructing a digital recreation populated with computer-generated props rendered in near-microscopic detail, a requirement imposed by the sequence's use of 3D photography. Peters and a stunt double were filmed both suspended by harness and on a treadmill in front of a chroma key screen; only Peters' legs were digitally replaced in the final cut. Despite comprising only 29 effects shots, the sequence required nearly seven months of work from a team of 70 artists and won two Visual Effects Society Awards at the 13th annual ceremony: Outstanding Effects Simulations in a Photoreal/Live Action Feature Motion Picture, and Outstanding Virtual Cinematography in a Photoreal/Live Action Feature Motion Picture.

This version of Quicksilver appears in the Fox films X-Men: Days of Future Past (2014), X-Men: Apocalypse (2016), Deadpool 2 (2018), and Dark Phoenix (2019), all portrayed by Peters. In Days of Future Past, Maximoff is an American teenager living with his mother who is recruited to help break Erik Lehnsherr out of a Pentagon prison. In Apocalypse, the character takes on a substantially larger narrative role, being revealed as Lehnsherr's son and playing a central part in the climactic battle against En Sabah Nur; Rising Sun Pictures also provided the slow-motion effects for the film's mansion evacuation sequence, which received a Visual Effects Society Award nomination. Peters makes a brief cameo in Deadpool 2 alongside other members of the Apocalypse cast. In Dark Phoenix, set in 1992, Maximoff is depicted as a full member of the X-Men. Peters stated of the character's arc across the films that by Dark Phoenix Maximoff had become more mature and focused on using his abilities for others.

The character was praised by critics and audiences for the slow-motion action sequences devised around his powers. Reviewing X-Men: Apocalypse, Richard Roeper of the Chicago Sun-Times described the mansion evacuation sequence as the film's signature scene, calling it "a beautiful, funny, exciting, altogether magical sequence." Peters was nominated for a Teen Choice Award as Choice Scene Stealer for his performance in the same film. Screen Rant later described the character as one of the most popular figures in the Fox X-Men series, crediting the recurring slow-motion sequences with establishing him as a fan favorite.

==== Marvel Cinematic Universe ====
In the Marvel Cinematic Universe (MCU), Pietro Maximoff is portrayed by Aaron Taylor-Johnson. He first appeared alongside his twin sister Wanda (Elizabeth Olsen) in a mid-credits scene for Captain America: The Winter Soldier (2014), with the two subsequently appearing in leading roles in Avengers: Age of Ultron (2015). Pietro and Wanda seek revenge on Tony Stark, whose weapons killed their parents, by joining Hydra, who use the Mind Stone to grant them superhuman powers after they volunteer to be experimented on. After Stark and the Avengers defeat the Hydra cell they were working with, the Maximoffs join forces with Ultron, only to learn he intends to kill all of humanity and defect to the Avengers to stop him. While thwarting his plot, Pietro dies while saving Hawkeye and a small child. Despite Taylor-Johnson signing a multi-picture deal, producer Kevin Feige has stated that there are no plans for Pietro to appear in future films. Following Disney's acquisition of Fox's film division, Taylor-Johnson was asked if he might return to the role. While he expressed belief both parties were open to the possibility in the future, Taylor-Johnson reiterated that there were no immediate plans for him to reprise his role - specifically addressing speculation he would appear in the Disney+ series WandaVision. Although Taylor-Johnson did not reprise his role in the series, the character would be referenced, with Gabriel Gurevich portraying him as a child in flashbacks to Wanda's childhood, while Peters portrays Ralph Bohner, a resident of Westview who is brainwashed by Agatha Harkness and forced to impersonate Pietro to get close to Wanda until he is freed by Monica Rambeau.

=== Video games ===
Quicksilver's first video game appearance was in Captain America and The Avengers (1991), as a member of the Avengers. He also makes a cameo appearance in X-Men Legends II: Rise of Apocalypse (2005) as a member of Magneto's Brotherhood of Mutants. Quicksilver's first voiced appearance in a video game occurred in Marvel: Ultimate Alliance 2 (2009), where he appears as a boss in the PSP, PS2, and Wii versions, being voiced by Robert Tinkler. He makes a further appearance in X-Men: Destiny, voiced by Sunil Malhotra.

Quicksilver appears as a playable character: in Marvel Super Hero Squad: The Infinity Gauntlet and Marvel Super Hero Squad Online, voiced by Scott Menville; Lego Marvel's Avengers, voiced using archival audio of Aaron Taylor-Johnson; and Marvel: Future Fight.

=== Literature ===
An alternate timeline version of Quicksilver appears in the novel What If... Wanda Maximoff and Peter Parker Were Siblings?, written by Seanan McGuire. This version (Pietro von Doom) was adopted by Doctor Doom, who gave him and his sister Wanda their powers in an attempt to use the latter to further his goals until she was found and adopted by Richard and Mary Parker.
