= High Evolutionary =

Marvel Comics fictional character

- The High Evolutionary as seen in Annihilation: Conquest #1 (January 2008); Art by Tom Raney.

Publication information
- Publisher: Marvel Comics
- First appearance: Mentioned: The Mighty Thor #133 (October 1966); Full appearance: The Mighty Thor #134 (November 1966)
- Created by: Stan Lee; Jack Kirby

In-story information
- Full name: Herbert Edgar Wyndham
- Species: Human mutate/cyborg
- Team affiliations: New Men/Knights of Wundagore
- Notable aliases: Lord High Evolutionary
- Abilities: Immense intelligence; Psionic powers; Sentient armor grants: Superhuman strength and durability; Flight; Regeneration; Manipulation of matter and energy; Size-shifting

The High Evolutionary (Herbert Edgar Wyndham) is a fictional character appearing in American comic books published by Marvel Comics. He is depicted as a scientist who seeks to evolve different life forms such as the New Men. The High Evolutionary's goals have often put him at odds with different superheroes.

Originally introduced as an antagonist in the Thor comics, the High Evolutionary would go on to feature prominently in storylines involving the Fantastic Four and the Silver Surfer. His backstory was later connected to the X-Men villain Mister Sinister, while the High Evolutionary became integral to the origin stories of the Avengers heroes Scarlet Witch, Quicksilver, and Spider-Woman.

Chukwudi Iwuji portrays the High Evolutionary in the Marvel Cinematic Universe film Guardians of the Galaxy Vol. 3 (2023). Additionally, Richard Newman, Jonathan Frakes, Corey Burton, and Nolan North have voiced the character in animation.

== Creation ==
Co-creator Stan Lee stated the character was inspired by the H. G. Wells novel The Island of Doctor Moreau.

== Publication history ==
The High Evolutionary was created by writer Stan Lee and artist Jack Kirby. He was first mentioned in The Mighty Thor #133 (October 1966) and made his first full appearance the following month, in The Mighty Thor #134 (November 1966); his New Men had been alluded to in the previous issue, #132.

After his introduction in the Thor comics, the High Evolutionary became central to Marvel's Counter-Earth stories of the early 1970s and to the Warlock series that grew out of them, beginning in Marvel Premiere #1 (April 1972). He served as the antagonist of the 1988 company-wide crossover "Evolutionary War", which ran through that year's line of annuals, and returned in the 2008 "Annihilation: Conquest" storyline.

== Fictional character biography ==
Phaeder hands Wyndham the papers to break the genetic code.

Herbert Wyndham is born in Manchester, England. While a student at Oxford in the 1930s, he takes an interest in the work of genetic biologist Nathaniel Essex and begins experimenting with genetic manipulation, building a machine (which he calls the genetic accelerator) with which he attempts to "evolve" the rats in his mother's London basement. While attending a genetics conference in Geneva, Wyndham is approached by a mysterious man (who is in truth the outcast Inhuman geneticist Phaeder) who hands him papers containing blueprints for cracking the genetic code. With this information to bolster his experiments, Wyndham develops a serum he dubs "Isotope A".

Although expelled from the university for his single-mindedness, he eventually evolves his pet Dalmatian Dempsey into a humanoid form with the intelligence of a chimpanzee. However, Dempsey is shot by poachers, and Wyndham realizes that such creatures as he would create would have no place in the human world. In partnership with scientist Jonathan Drew (father of Jessica Drew), Wyndham moves his experiments to the seclusion of Mount Wundagore in Transia. The discovery of uranium on the land (inherited by Drew's wife) provides vast funding, and they buy more land from local baron Gregor Russoff.

Assembling a "citadel of science" designed by German scientist Horace Grayson (father of the future Marvel Boy) and built by Moloid slaves supplied by Phaeder, the pair continue their experiment until Drew's daughter falls ill from uranium poisoning and is placed into suspended animation to save her life. Subsequently, Drew's wife is attacked and killed by Russoff's werewolf form, and Drew leaves Wundagore. Wyndham develops a suit of protective silver armor for himself and continues his work. Now joined in his work by research assistant Miles Warren, Wyndham makes increasingly radical breakthroughs, including the genetic acceleration of animals into humanoid beings that he dubbed his "New Men".

When Jonathan Drew returns to Wundagore and is possessed by the ghost of the magician Magnus, he warns that the citadel has been built upon the place where the Elder God Chthon was banished. He trains the New Men in the ways of combat and chivalry, with the group becoming the Knights of Wundagore and Wyndham becoming known as the "Lord High Evolutionary". In 1958, Baron Russoff attempts to use the Darkhold to cure himself of his lycanthropy, inadvertently freeing Chthon from imprisonment until Magnus re-seals him. On the same night, Wanda Maximoff and Pietro Maximoff are born at the citadel, with their mother Magda fleeing afterward. Wanda gains the ability to wield chaos magic due to Chthon's influence.

The High Evolutionary observing from his base within Counter-Earth's moon.

Wyndham, seeing opportunities beyond Earth, converts his scientific research citadel into a spaceship, exploring the stars with his New Men. He eventually establishes Counter-Earth, a planet akin to Earth. Although Counter-Earth is meant to be a temporary structure that will be evolved into a paradise, the Man-Beast corrupts the process, resulting in Counter-Earth becoming an imperfect world. By this time the High Evolutionary has adopted Adam Warlock and bestowed on him the Soul Gem, dispatching him to redeem Counter-Earth.

During the "Evolutionary War" storyline, the High Evolutionary becomes increasingly unstable and maniacal. He attempts to kill himself, but is stopped by his suit. The High Evolutionary manipulates Hulk into destroying his armor, which malfunctions and devolves the High Evolutionary into a mass of single-celled organisms. However, the suit's circuits reorganize and restore the High Evolutionary to his previous state. His death and subsequent rebirth give the High Evolutionary a new insight into the future of mankind. Rather than being a benevolent yet distant protector, as he had been with his New Men, he now takes a direct hand in molding the future of humanity.

Cover of Avengers Annual #17. Art by Sal Buscema.

The High Evolutionary comes into conflict with a number of superheroes, notably the reserve Avengers and Adam Warlock, when he tries to forcibly mutate (or "evolve") the entire population of the Earth with his "Evolution Bomb". The Avengers stop him, though the High Evolutionary and Hercules are exposed to the High Evolutionary's Genesis Chamber and become "more than a god", phasing out of existence. The evolved essences of the High Evolutionary and Hercules are harvested by the Celestials and manipulated for unknown purposes in the Black Galaxy. Eventually both are returned to human form, and the High Evolutionary returns to space with the Knights of Wundagore.

During the Annihilation: Conquest storyline, the High Evolutionary reappears in Kree space, working on restructuring the Kree genome in a fortress inside a star. Adam Warlock brings Quasar and Moondragon to him after being overwhelmed by Phalanx warriors, who quickly invade the High Evolutionary's vessel. After learning that Ultron is leading the Phalanx militia, the High Evolutionary detonates the star, vaporizing his ship, Ultron, and the invading Phalanx warriors. The High Evolutionary is captured by the Phalanx and forced to transfer the essence of Ultron into Warlock's body, apparently killing him. However, the High Evolutionary is aware that Warlock's consciousness has survived and implies that Warlock will "lead the way" for the new Guardians of the Galaxy.

The High Evolutionary works with Magneto and Blob to determine why so many mutants were depowered on M-Day. He develops a suit for the depowered Magneto that replicates his original powers, and Magneto leads an attack on San Francisco as a distraction so that the High Evolutionary could gain a currently unknown object from inside of the Dreaming Celestial Tiamut. After extensively examining Tiamut, the High Evolutionary subjects Magneto to a dangerous procedure that successfully restores his powers.

The High Evolutionary drains the Silver Surfer's Power Cosmic into himself, rendering the Surfer mortal and giving the High Evolutionary the ability to control and modify the star sphere of the civilization-destroying entity Galactus, allowing him to bestow life to dead worlds. The High Evolutionary creates a herald for himself as well as a silver-coated biome of life on Earth, which needs only sunlight to survive, without the need to kill other animals. The Surfer and the Fantastic Four unite with the armed forces to kill all the High Evolutionary's creations on the grounds that they eradicate emotion and individuality from the humans who are transformed. They again exterminate the High Evolutionary's creations after he begins to terraform the Moon, on the rationale that it will affect tides and animal migrations. Galactus arrives, and the Fantastic Four cheer on Galactus to kill Wyndham, but as the High Evolutionary now serves an equal opposite "World Builder" function of creating rather than committing genocide on sentient civilizations, he allows the High Evolutionary to leave with his star sphere to continue creating new life throughout the universe.

The High Evolutionary creates a new Counter-Earth inhabited by millions of New Men. The High Evolutionary routinely exterminates the entire population of New Men when they ultimately fail to meet his standards of perfection and then re-creates them. He is served in his plans by a human called the Master Scientist and Luminous (a female created from the genetic templates of Quicksilver and Scarlet Witch). After being tracked down and defeated by Luminous, Quicksilver and the Scarlet Witch are brought to the High Evolutionary himself. He reveals to them that Django and Marya Maximoff are their true parents. He also tells them the truth: Wanda and Pietro are not mutants and gained their abilities after being experimented on by the High Evolutionary.

Continuing his work on Counter-Earth, the High Evolutionary uses his technology to accelerate Counter-Earth to combine it with Earth. Falcon and Viv Vision are unexpectedly teleported to Counter-Earth and brought to the High Evolutionary. He decides to evolve them, starting by turning Viv into a human. The High Evolutionary is seemingly killed when his teleporter malfunctions; in reality, he has been transported to another dimension as living data. The High Evolutionary is returned to his dimension by the Knights of Wundagore, but leaves Counter-Earth after being disappointed with the outcome of his experiment.

In the prelude to the "Hunted" storyline, Kraven the Hunter hunts several of the New Men to draw out the High Evolutionary. Kraven cuts a deal with the High Evolutionary to take his DNA sample and create 87 clones of him. The Last Son of Kraven kills the other clones and proves himself to Kraven.

In the series Spider-Boy, the High Evolutionary is revealed to have known Madame Monstrosity, who also experiments with creating Humanimals. He is not pleased with the demonstration that fuses a plumber with a crab and Madame Monstrosity's failure to create Humanimals who can shift between their human and animal forms. The High Evolutionary leaves, advising Madame Monstrosity not to contact him again. After Madame Monstrosity transforms herself into a chimera to battle Spider-Boy, the High Evolutionary takes her to be studied, being impressed with her form.

== Characterization ==
=== Powers and abilities ===
The High Evolutionary has evolved his intelligence to the upper limit of human potential, and is the only human whose intelligence and knowledge has been listed as equal to certain cosmic entities. He is considered the leading geneticist in the Marvel universe, and is vastly knowledgeable in biology, chemistry, medicine, physics, engineering, human psychology, computer science, and cybernetics.

Due to experimentation on his own genome, his highly enhanced brain and cybernetic exoskeleton, the High Evolutionary has demonstrated god-like powers; including the ability to evolve and devolve life-forms, superhuman strength and durability, manipulating matter at a subatomic level, energy manipulation and projection, cosmic awareness, precognition, telepathy, telekinesis, extra-dimensional travel, and size alteration. On one occasion, he managed to hold his own against Galactus for a prolonged time before being defeated.

Of note, the High Evolutionary has forged weapons for his New Men that show some anti-mystical properties, as demonstrated by a lance wielded by Beast that was able to damage the Darkhold.

=== Equipment ===
His exoskeleton provides him with an uncanny degree of protection from attacks, and also provides life support (filtering/recycling his air and providing sustenance when needed). If he is badly damaged, the suit can heal his wounds and can completely restore him to life using records of his genome and brain activity patterns, as in one instance the suit restored him fully after he had attempted to commit suicide by destroying his own body.

=== Personality ===
The High Evolutionary's character has varied between that of a weary, well-meaning creator to that of a "mad scientist" who is willing to do whatever he considers necessary to further his goals of evolving a better, less-brutal world. He has great respect for the process of evolution, but is also deeply troubled by the immense amount of death and suffering required for such slow progress (see the Quicksilver series). Although menacing and arrogant during his maniacal phases, the High Evolutionary's history also contains more than one example of his desire to be responsible, creative, and kind. Most Marvel writers have resisted portraying him as a standard-fare villain, thereby adding levels of sympathy and complexity to the character. The High Evolutionary has been manipulated and driven to insanity by both the Beyonders and the Celestials, cosmic races that have interfered with human evolution in the past, indicating that his work might perhaps be a threat to their own. Even at his most unstable, the High Evolutionary has always demonstrated a paternal love toward even his most flawed creations: he rehabilitated Nobilus, has attempted to heal Count Tagar and the God Pack, and has spared the Man-Beast his life despite multiple attempts to murder him. At one point, he offered to (and did) restore the Savage Land after it was destroyed by Terminus, even though it had been created by the very race that had confiscated and then destroyed his own beloved creation, Counter-Earth.

The High Evolutionary played a key role in saving the Earth from Chthon, and rescued Galactus from death despite his attempts to consume Counter-Earth. He has served as a benevolent father figure to several characters, including Adam Warlock, Quicksilver, Spider-Woman, Wolverine, and Thor, often charging them with tasks that lead to their personal growth as individuals and heroes. Along these lines, he has taken a pointed interest in developing a sense of nobility and decency in his creations, most notably the New Men.

At times the High Evolutionary has feigned indifference to the fate of others when his own safety is at stake, only to reveal a considerably more benign agenda later (see the Annihilation: Conquest series). More frequently, he has shown a sympathetic and protective concern for the defenseless: on several occasions he has gone to considerable lengths to protect young children, including the critically ill Jessica Drew, Wanda and Pietro Maximoff, and Pietro's daughter Luna. He gave Magda shelter from the elements without hesitation, risked death to fight Galactus over Counter-Earth, and literally begged Ka-Zar not to poison the Earth's biosphere with Isotope E out of compassion for the suffering it would cause. He tried to aid Magneto in reversing the effects of M-Day. He delayed an attack on the Silver Surfer to allow him time to save the life of Suzi Endo, who would briefly become his herald.

Though made personally wealthy by uranium deposits, the High Evolutionary has also provided for a generous financial trust for the people of Transia, ensuring economic stability for the nation.

== In other media ==
=== Television ===
The High Evolutionary as he appears in Spider-Man Unlimited.

- The High Evolutionary appears in X-Men: The Animated Series, voiced by Robert Bockstael. This version seeks to create a superior generation of New Men by using mutant DNA to transform humans into bestial beings instead of experimenting on animals.
- The High Evolutionary appears in Spider-Man Unlimited, voiced by Richard Newman. This version believes a greater genetic diversity heightens survival traits. Disgusted with humans' behavior on Earth, he departed for Counter-Earth to begin anew sometime before the series, only to find the same destructive tendencies in their humans. In response, he created a new society with human/animal creatures loyal to him called Beastials, which went on to replace humanity as the dominant species as well as elite Beastials called the Knights of Wundagore capable of leading Machine Men as law enforcers. In the present, the High Evolutionary's society is disrupted by the arrival of John Jameson, Spider-Man, Venom, and Carnage before he is eventually defeated by Spider-Man, the Counter-Earth Green Goblin, and a human rebellion led by his granddaughter Karen O'Malley.
- An alternate reality version of the High Evolutionary appears in The Super Hero Squad Show episode "The Devil Dinosaur You Say! (Six Against Infinity, Part 4)", voiced by Jonathan Frakes. This version hails from "Dinosaur World", an alternate reality populated primarily by dinosaurs.
- The High Evolutionary appears in the Hulk and the Agents of S.M.A.S.H. episode "Future Shock", voiced by Corey Burton. This version hails from a possible future where a gamma meteor struck the Earth and regressed humanity to a primitive state, allowing him to turn them into Animal Men.
- The High Evolutionary appears in Guardians of the Galaxy, voiced by Nolan North.

=== Film ===
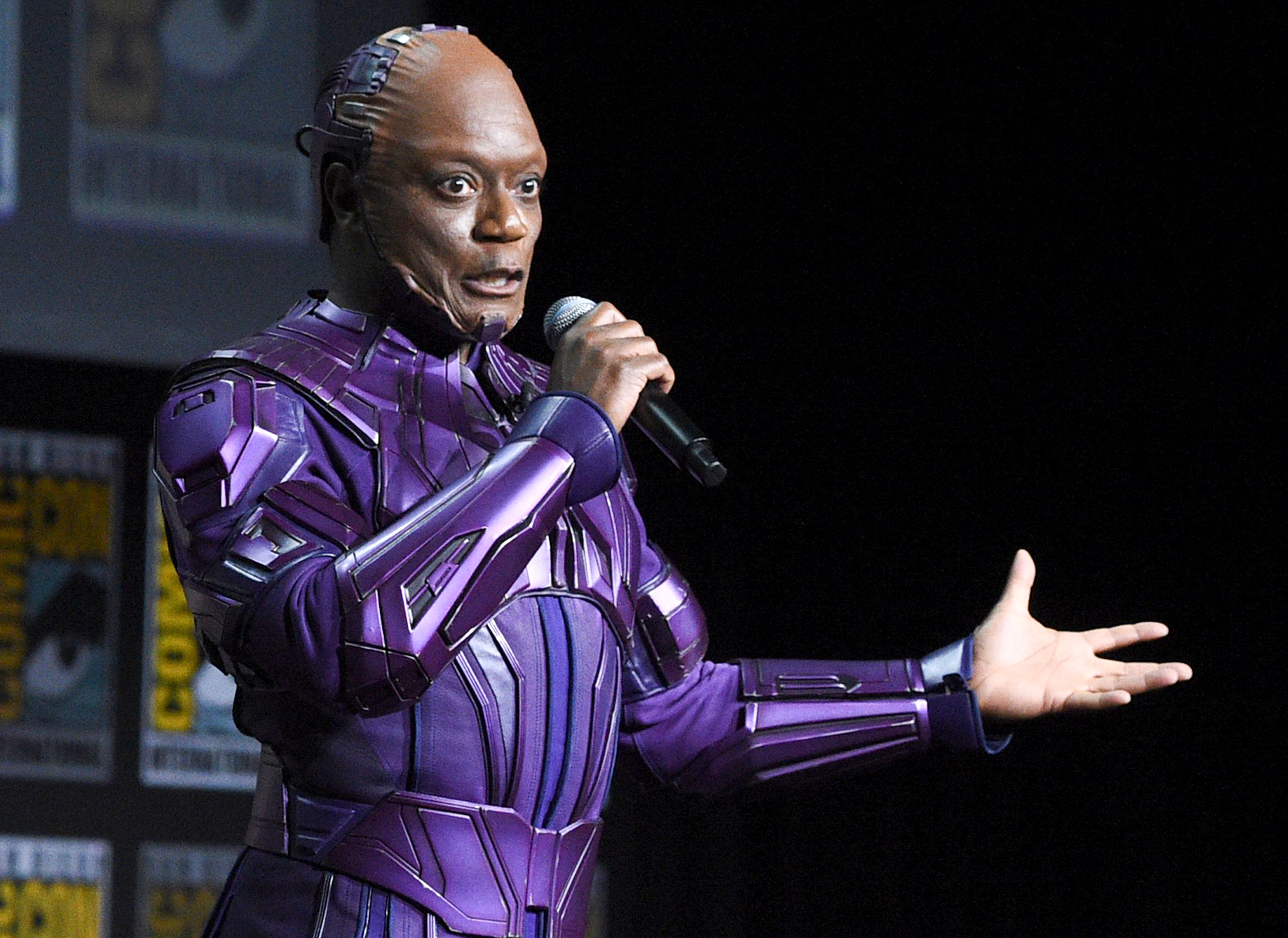
Chukwudi Iwuji in costume as the High Evolutionary at Comic Con 2022.

The High Evolutionary appears in Guardians of the Galaxy Vol. 3, portrayed by Chukwudi Iwuji. This version is a long-lived alien geneticist and the founder and CEO of the intergalactic bio-engineering company OrgoCorp. Seeking to improve what he considers lower lifeforms, he created the Humanimals of Counter-Earth from Earth animals, the Sovereign, and Half-worlders such as Batch 89, which included 89P13 / Rocket. After Rocket demonstrates intelligence and technical proficiency in solving a problem with his Humanimals, the High Evolutionary tries to harvest Rocket's brain for further study and incinerate the rest of Batch 89. Rocket leads them in an escape, but all save for him are killed by the High Evolutionary and his Recorders. The High Evolutionary pursues Rocket until he is defeated by the Guardians of the Galaxy. After Rocket chooses to spare his creator's life while rescuing his experiments, Drax carries the High Evolutionary from his exploding ship to be imprisoned on Knowhere.

=== Video games ===
The High Evolutionary appears in Marvel: Avengers Alliance. This version created "Iso-Saurs" while experimenting on dinosaurs with Iso-8 crystals.

=== Miscellaneous ===
The High Evolutionary appears in the novel Avengers: Everybody Wants to Rule the World by Dan Abnett.

== Reception ==
Writing for Comic Book Resources, John Dodge, Scoot Allan, and Ajay Aravind ranked the High Evolutionary the 26th most important Marvel Comics villain, describing him as "the first in a long line of antagonists to use genetics like a weapon".

Nicolas Ayala of Screen Rant named the High Evolutionary the best Marvel film villain of 2023 for his portrayal in Guardians of the Galaxy Vol. 3, writing that the character "has no redeeming qualities whatsoever, which allows the audience to root against him without hesitation".
