= Thor (comic book) =

Marvel Comics series since 1966

- Thor battles Hercules on the cover of the character's first self-titled issue, Thor #126 (March 1966); Art by Jack Kirby and Vince Colletta

Publication information
- Publisher: Marvel Comics
- Schedule: Monthly
- Format: Ongoing series
- Genre: Superhero
- Publication date: List: (vol. 1) March 1966 – September 1996 (vol. 2) July 1998 – December 2004 (vol. 3) September 2007 – January 2009 (vol. 1 cont.) April 2009 – May 2011 (The Mighty Thor vol. 1) June 2011 – December 2012 (Thor: God of Thunder) January 2013 – November 2014 (vol. 4) October 2014 – July 2015 (The Mighty Thor vol. 2) January 2016 – June 2018 (vol. 5) August 2018 – October 2019 (King Thor) November 2019 – February 2020 (vol. 6) March 2020 – August 2023 (Immortal Thor) October 2023 – July 2025) (Mortal Thor) August 2025 – July 2026 (vol. 7) August 2026 –
- No. of issues: List: (vol. 1) 377 (#126–502) plus 18 annuals (vol. 2) 85 (#1–85) plus 3 Annuals (vol. 3) 12 (#1–12) (vol. 1 cont.) 23 (#600–621 and #620.1), 1 Annual and 2 Specials (The Mighty Thor vol. 1) 23 (#1–22 plus #12.1) (Thor: God of Thunder) 25 (#1–25) (vol. 4) 8 (#1–8) (The Mighty Thor vol. 2) 30 (#1–23 and #700–706) (vol. 5) 16 (#1–16) (King Thor) 4 (#1–4) (vol. 6) 36 (#1–35, Annual #1) (Immortal Thor) 25 (#1–25) (Mortal Thor) 13 (#1–13) (vol. 7) 2 (#800–801) (as of November 2026 cover date)
- Main characters: List of Thor (Marvel Comics) supporting characters

Creative team
- Written by: List: (vol. 1) Stan Lee (126–192, 254, 385, Annual #1–2, 4), Gerry Conway (193-238), Roy Thomas (239-240, 272-278, 280, 283-298, 472-489, Annual #7-8, 14-15, 17, 19), Bill Mantlo (240–241, 309), Len Wein (242–253, 255–271), Donald F. Glut (279), Ralph Macchio (281-282, 298, 300-307, 311-314, Annual #14), Mark Gruenwald (281-282, 299, 300-307, 311-314, Annual #10), Steven Grant (323), Doug Moench (303, 308, 310–322, 324–328), Alan Zelenetz (329-336, Annual #10-13), Walt Simonson (337–355, 357–369, 371-382), Bob Harras (356), James Owsley (370), Tom DeFalco (383-384, 386-400, 402-459, 490, Annual #16), Randall Frenz (400-401, Annual #14), Ron Marz (460-471, Annual #18), Warren Ellis (491-494), William Messner-Loebs (495-502) (vol. 2) Dan Jurgens (1–58, 60-79; Annual 1999, Annual 2000, Annual 2001), Christopher Priest (59), Michael Avon Oeming (80-85) (vol. 3) J. Michael Straczynski (1-12) (vol. 1 cont.) J. Michael Straczynski (600-603), Kieron Gillen Matt Fraction (The Mighty Thor vol. 1) Matt Fraction (Thor: God of Thunder) Jason Aaron (vol. 4) Jason Aaron (The Mighty Thor vol. 2) Jason Aaron (vol. 5) Jason Aaron (King Thor) Jason Aaron (vol. 6) Donny Cates Torunn Grønbekk (Immortal Thor) Al Ewing (Mortal Thor) Al Ewing (vol. 7)
- Penciller: List: (vol. 1) Jack Kirby John Buscema Walt Simonson Ron Frenz M.C. Wyman Mike Deodato (vol. 2) John Romita Jr. Andy Kubert Stuart Immonen Tom Raney Joe Bennett Ben Lai Scot Eaton Tom Raney Andrea Di Vito (vol. 3) Oliver Coipel (vol. 1 cont.) Marko Djurdjević Billy Tan Richard Elson Doug Braithwaite Pasqual Ferry (The Mighty Thor vol. 1) Olivier Coipel Pasqual Ferry Pepe Larraz Alan Davis (Thor: God of Thunder) Esad Ribic (vol. 4) Russell Dauterman Jorge Molina (The Mighty Thor vol. 2) Russel Dauterman Rafa Gares Frazer Irving Steve Epting James Harren Valerio Schitti (vol. 5) Mike del Mundo Christian Ward Scott Hepburn (King Thor) Esad Ribic (vol. 6) Nic Klein (Immortal Thor) Martín Cóccolo (Mortal Thor) Pasqual Ferry (vol. 7) Pasqual Ferry
- Inker: List: (vol. 1) Vince Colletta Bill Everett George Klein Joe Sinnott Mike Esposito (vol. 2) Klaus Janson Scott Hanna Jack Jadson Drew Geraci (vol. 3) Mark Morales (vol. 1 cont.) Danny Miki Matt Banning (The Mighty Thor vol. 1) Mark Morales Mark Farmer
- Colorists: List: (vol. 1) Ovi Hondru Marie Javins (vol. 2) Gregory Wright Brian Reber (The Mighty Thor vol. 1) Frank D'Armata Javier Rodriguez (vol. 3) Laura Martin (vol. 1 cont.) Paul Mounts Andy Troy Matt Hollingsworth (Thor: God of Thunder) Ive Svorcina (The Mighty Thor vol. 2) Matthew Wilson; Frank Martin (vol. 3) (vol. 1 cont.) Paul Mounts (Immortal Thor) Matthew Wilson

Thor, or The Mighty Thor, is the name of several comic book titles featuring the character Thor and published by Marvel Comics, beginning with the original Thor comic book series which debuted in 1966.

== Publication history ==
The Marvel Comics superhero Thor debuted in the science fiction/fantasy anthology title Journey into Mystery #83 (cover-date August 1962), and was created by editor-plotter Stan Lee, scripter Larry Lieber, and penciller-plotter Jack Kirby.

Subsequent stories of the 13-page feature "The Mighty Thor" continued to be plotted by Lee, and were variously scripted by Lieber or by Robert Bernstein, working under the pseudonym "R. Berns". Various artists penciled the feature, including Jack Kirby, Joe Sinnott, Don Heck, and Al Hartley. With Journey into Mystery #101 (Feb. 1964), the series began a long and definitive run by writer and co-plotter Lee and penciler and co-plotter Kirby that lasted until the by-then-retitled Thor #179 (Aug. 1970).

The five-page featurette "Tales of Asgard" was added in Journey into Mystery #97 (Oct. 1963), followed by "The Mighty Thor" becoming the dominant cover logo with issue #104 (May 1964). The feature itself expanded to 18 pages in #105, which eliminated the remaining anthological story from each issue; it was reduced to 16 pages five issues later. Comics historian Les Daniels noted that "the adventures of Thor were gradually transformed from stories about a strange-looking superhero into a spectacular saga." Artist Chic Stone, who inked several early Thor stories, observed that "Kirby could just lead you through all these different worlds. The readers would follow him anywhere."

Journey into Mystery was retitled Thor (per the indicia, or The Mighty Thor per most covers) with issue #126 (March 1966). "Tales of Asgard" was replaced by a five-page featurette starring the Inhumans from #146–152 (Nov. 1967–May 1968), after which featurettes were dropped and the Thor stories expanded to Marvel's then-standard 20-page length. Marvel filed for a trademark for "The Mighty Thor" in 1967 and the United States Patent and Trademark Office issued the registration in 1970.

After Kirby left the title, Neal Adams penciled issues #180–181 (Sept.-Oct. 1970). John Buscema then became the regular artist the following issue. Buscema continued to draw the book almost without interruption until #278 (Dec. 1978). Lee stopped scripting soon after Kirby left, and during Buscema's long stint on the book, the stories were mostly written by Gerry Conway, Len Wein, or Roy Thomas. Thomas continued to write the title after Buscema's departure, working much of the time with the artist Keith Pollard; during this period Thomas integrated many elements of traditional Norse mythology into the title, with specific stories translated into comics form. Following Thomas's tenure, Thor had a changing creative team.

In the mid-1970s, Marvel considered giving the character a second series as part of parent company Magazine Management's line of black-and-white comics magazines. A story written by Steve Englehart for the aborted project appeared in Thor Annual #5 (1976). A black-and-white Thor story appeared in Marvel Preview #10 (Winter 1977).

Walt Simonson took over both writing and art as of #337 (Nov. 1983). His stories placed a greater emphasis on the character's mythological origins. Simonson's run as writer-artist lasted until #367 (May 1986), although he continued to write – and occasionally draw – the book until issue #382 (Aug. 1987). Simonson's run, which introduced the character Beta Ray Bill, was regarded as a popular and critical success. Simonson's later stories were drawn by Sal Buscema, who describes Simonson's stories as "very stimulating. It was a pleasure working on his plots, because they were a lot of fun to illustrate. He had a lot of great ideas, and he took Thor in a totally new direction." Asked why he was leaving Thor, Simonson said that he felt the series was due for a change in creative direction, and that he wanted to reduce his work load for a time. After Simonson's departure, Marvel's editor-in-chief at the time, Tom DeFalco, became the writer. Working primarily with artist Ron Frenz, DeFalco stayed on the book until #459 (Feb. 1993).

As a consequence of the "Heroes Reborn" crossover story arc of the 1990s, Thor was removed from mainstream Marvel continuity and with other Marvel characters re-imagined in an alternate universe for one year. The Thor title reverted to Journey into Mystery with issue #503 (Nov. 1996), and ran four different, sequential features ("The Lost Gods"; "Master of Kung Fu"; "Black Widow", and "Hannibal King") before ceasing publication with #521 (June 1998).

When the character was returned to the mainstream Marvel Universe, Thor was relaunched with Thor vol. 2, #1 (July 1998). As of issue #36, the title used dual numbering in a tribute to the original Thor series, and the caption box for said issue became #36 / #538 (June 2001). The title ran until issue #85 / #587, dated December 2004. Dan Jurgens wrote the first 79 issues, with Daniel Berman and Michael Avon Oeming completing the series.

The third volume debuted as Thor #1 (Sept. 2007), initially written by J. Michael Straczynski and penciled by Olivier Coipel. Beginning with what would have been vol. 3, #13 (Jan. 2009), the third volume reverted to issue #600, reflecting the total number of published issues from all three volumes. Kieron Gillen took over from Straczynski in Thor #604 with artists Billy Tan, Richard Elson and Dougie Braithwaite, with his final storyline finishing in issue #614. Matt Fraction took over the series with issue #615, after having been announced as starting in Thor #610 and #611.

In April 2011, Thor once again reverted to its original title of Journey into Mystery with issue #622, reuniting writer Gillen and artist Braithwaite in a series of stories starring Thor's adopted brother, Loki.

In October 2014, a fourth volume of Thor by Jason Aaron and artist Russell Dauterman debuted that featured a female character (later revealed to be Jane Foster) in the role of Thor after the classic hero is no longer able to wield Mjolnir. Aaron stated that "this is not She-Thor. This is not Lady Thor. This is not Thorita. This is Thor. This is the Thor of the Marvel Universe. But it's unlike any Thor we've ever seen before." The following October, Aaron and Dauterman signed an exclusive agreement with Marvel to continue their work together in a second volume of The Mighty Thor, also starring Foster.

In January 2020, Thor volume #6 debuted, written by Donny Cates. This story follows Thor, as he becomes the new king of Asgard and tries to fulfill his duties as a king while fighting his destiny in an attempt to save the multiverse from an unknown threat. After Cates had to depart Thor due to suffering a car accident in early 2023, Torunn Grønbekk was brought on to write the remaining issues of the series.
