= AXIS (comics) =

2014 comic book storyline by Marvel Comics

"Avengers & X-Men: AXIS"
- Cover for Avengers & X-Men: AXIS #1 (October 2014). Art by Jim Cheung
- Publisher: Marvel Comics
- Publication date: October – December 2014
- Genre: Superhero; Crossover
- Main character(s): Avengers; Red Skull; Uncanny Avengers; X-Men

Creative team
- Writer: Rick Remender
- Penciller: List: Adam Kubert (#1–2, #7) Leinil Francis Yu (#3–4, #8) Terry Dodson (#5–6) Jim Cheung (#9)
- Inker: List: Gerry Alanguilan (#3–4) Leinil Francis Yu (#4) Rachel Dodson (#5)
- Letterer: Chris Eliopoulos
- Colorist: List: Laura Martin (#1–3, 5) Matt Milla (#1–3, 5) Edgar Delgado (#3–4)

"AXIS" (also known as "Avengers & X-Men: AXIS") is a 2014 crossover comic book storyline published by Marvel Comics. Written by Rick Remender, the story involves an initial team-up between the Avengers, X-Men, and a group of villains against Red Skull, who managed to harness the powers of Onslaught and the recently deceased Professor Xavier. As the team rapidly begins losing the battle, Scarlet Witch and Doctor Doom cast a powerful inversion spell, which mistakenly reverses the morality of everyone present at the battle, leading to further conflict between the now villainous heroes and heroic villains. Prior to the release of AXIS, tie-ins entitled "March to AXIS" set up the storyline in the September issues of Captain America, Loki: Agent of Asgard, Magneto and Uncanny Avengers. Despite the excitement leading up to the series' release, it received mixed reviews from fans and critics.

== Plot ==
=== Main plot ===
==== Act I – "The Red Supremacy" ====
===== Chapter 1: We Will All Be Dead Tomorrow =====
Red Onslaught broadcasts a telepathic wave of hatred across the world, creating countless riots and driving the Avengers to battle each other. Iron Man manages to deploy a telepathic disrupter and rescues the team, and the Avengers attempt to locate the source of the broadcast. In Genosha, Magneto, Rogue, and the Scarlet Witch fight Red Onslaught, who is still trying to control Wanda to rewrite reality. Magneto frees Havok, Cyclops, Quentin Quire, and Evan Sabahnur, who fight amongst themselves and against Ahab. A team of Avengers and X-Men (Captain America, Hawkeye, Iron Man, Thor, Vision, Colossus, Nightcrawler, and Storm) arrive to rally the heroes and fight Red Onslaught. Iron Man uses a telepathic dampener to stop the Red Skull's influence, and more heroes arrived to help (Angel, Beast, Cannonball, Doctor Strange, Hulk, Hyperion, Iceman, Invisible Woman, Iron Fist, Luke Cage, Medusa, Nova, Shadowcat, and Sunspot) Red Onslaught reveals that he influenced Stark to create a model of Sentinels, which are deployed to fight the heroes.

===== Chapter 2: Theme to a Desperate Scene =====
With the appearance of the Stark Sentinels, the tide of the battle quickly turns to Red Onslaught's favor. Rogue comes up with a plan to defeat the Skull, proposing that Doctor Strange and the Scarlet Witch cast a spell to invert the axis of Red Skull's brain and bring out the fragment of Professor X to defeat Onslaught. The plan fails due to Nova's untimely interference, and Scarlet Witch and Doctor Strange are targeted and captured by the Sentinels.

Magneto flees the battle, and the remaining heroes hide in Genosha with the help of Quentin Quire. After regaining consciousness, Iron Man organizes a last attempt to defeat the Sentinels, but fails and remains the last one standing. Red Onslaught gloats, telling Stark that he had seen into his mind, and that he was a sociopath fueled by competition, but this boast is interrupted by the return of Magneto, accompanied by a group of villains (Absorbing Man, Carnage, Deadpool, Doctor Doom, Enchantress, Hobgoblin, Jack O'Lantern, Loki, Mystique, and Sabretooth). Due to Stark's emphasis on documenting existing heroes, the Sentinels are not able to properly counter the unfamiliar villainous power sets.

===== Chapter 3: Good News for Bad People =====
The villains manage to defeat one of the Sentinels and free some of the trapped heroes. Scarlet Witch attempts to cast the inversion spell again with the help of Doctor Doom, and this time they are successful in knocking Red Onslaught unconscious and reverting him to the Red Skull. The other Stark Sentinels are defeated shortly thereafter, freeing the remaining heroes. Before Red Skull could wake and reveal whose mind was in control as the X-Men wanted, Steve Rogers and the Avengers decide to be cautious and take him back to Stark Tower. This caused Havok to resign from the Unity Division, telling Steve Rogers that Cyclops was right about him. Havok then sides with the now-unified X-Men and reconciles with his brother.

==== Act II – "Inversion" ====
===== Chapter 1: Altered Beast =====
Days later, S.H.I.E.L.D. gathers with Captain America to discuss the fate of Red Skull now that the Stark Sentinels had been dismantled and the concentration camps torn down. Nick Fury tries to convince him to hand Red Skull over, but under the growing influence of the inversion spell, Sam becomes violent and punches Fury, saying that Fury mistaken him for Steve and that "he's not that Captain America".

Meanwhile, in Brooklyn, a family held hostage by Squid is saved by the now-heroic Carnage. Spider-Man arrives on the scene, thinking that he has to fight Carnage to save the family, but to his surprise he finds Squid defeated and the family unharmed. Carnage also left a small piece of paper, with a drawing of his face and the phrase "from your friendly neighborhood Carnage," a play on Spider-Man's own catchphrase. Parker finds this both disturbing and verging on copyright violation.

In San Francisco, Iron Man arrives at the San Francisco Giants' stadium where he presented his new digital version of Extremis, free for every citizen of the city to achieve perfection. Among the crowd is Matt Murdock, who notices that Stark has started drinking again.

At the Jean Grey School, the X-Men reveal their new agenda of no longer desiring co-existence between humans and mutants, but instead desiring to stand above them with the help of Evan Sabahnur, who had become Apocalypse due to the inversion.

Back at the Avengers Tower, Captain America assembles the team regarding the current situation with the X-Men. In response, the Avengers decide to kill Red Skull, even if that might destroy any chance of recovering Professor X's soul. Both Hulk and Edwin Jarvis try to stop them, but they are overwhelmed and left behind. This triggers a new persona to surface in the Hulk called Kluh, who proceeds to attack the Avengers and flee the Tower, planning to cause destruction. After deciding that Kluh is not their problem as long as he stays out of their way, the Avengers arrive at Red Skull's cell, only to find it empty.

===== Chapter 2: Something Clearly Went Wrong =====
Captain America calls a meeting in the Avengers Tower for all the available heroes who were or had ever been Avengers. After informing the guests about the Red Skull's disappearance, Captain America reveals that only somebody with Avengers clearance would be able to free him, meaning that everyone in the room is a suspect. Spider-Man senses something is wrong, so he quickly escapes through the window along with Nova right before Captain America releases Pym Particles to imprison the gathered heroes. Spider-Man instructs Nova to fly them to safety, but they are attacked by Medusa and Captain America, and saved with the help of Magneto.

Magneto takes Spider-Man and Nova to the Avengers Mansion, where Steve Rogers informs them about the effects of the inversion, including Kluh's rampage across Arizona. Nova leaves to stop him, while the others plan.

At Avengers Tower, Captain America muses over the future of the world to Wasp, who he has hooked up to a machine to extract her Pym Particles. He concludes that the world needs a tyrant, and that he is the best candidate. The X-Men and Apocalypse arrive and attack Avengers Tower, looking for the Red Skull. When they find that he was gone, the X-Men brutally beat Captain America and proclaim their intent to conquer New York City, issuing an ultimatum that all humans be evacuated from Manhattan within three hours or perish.

===== Chapter 3: Awakened Like Us =====
After broadcasting a warning for humankind, the X-Men (who had created a gene bomb designed to kill those without the X-Gene in their body) are confronted by Mystique, who attempts to make them see the errors of their ways. Rogue and Nightcrawler stop her and force her to leave with Sabretooth.

Meanwhile, in San Francisco, Daredevil confronts Tony Stark about having unleashed Extremis and the problems this will cause to society. Despite not wearing his normal suit, Tony surprises Matt with increased agility and strength, throwing him from his headquarters.

In Latveria, Doctor Doom is attacked by Scarlet Witch, seeking revenge for Doom's tampering with her mind during the Decimation storyline. Doom is saved by Quicksilver and Magneto, the latter stating that Scarlet Witch would never recover from killing Doom.

In Las Vegas, Loki tries to unsuccessfully make his brother Thor listen to reason, and is saved by Steve Rogers, Nomad, and Spider-Man. After returning with Loki to the Avengers Mansion, Steve revealed that he has assembled the solution to deal with the inverted Avengers and X-Men: utilizing the team of inverted supervillains that Magneto previously recruited to fight Red Onslaught.

==== Act III – "New World Disorder" ====
===== Chapter 1: End the Line =====
As the newly formed Astonishing Avengers storm Apocalypse's ship and fight the X-Men, Spider-Man and the inverted Deadpool (now known as the pacifist hippie "Zenpool") attempt to sneak past Apocalypse and defuse the gene bomb. Zenpool distracts Apocalypse while Spider-Man works, but both fail and are thrown outside the ship, where they join the ongoing battle.

In Latveria, Scarlet Witch unleashes her power to fight Doom and seemingly kills both Quicksilver and Magneto, also discovering that she actually had no blood ties with Magneto while Doom flees.

In San Francisco, Captain America arrives at Stark Island, where Iron Man introduces him to the inverted Avengers and Medusa, who are willing to join forces once again upon learning that Steve Rogers had assembled the Astonishing Avengers.

Back in Manhattan, Zenpool tries to reason with Apocalypse, but he is beaten and beheaded, and the rest of the Astonishing Avengers are defeated. Apocalypse claims his victory as the gene bomb's countdown almost reaches zero.

===== Chapter 2: Why They Sting =====
With the gene bomb's countdown nearly completed, Spider-Man attempts to stop it by smothering the device with his webbing, but Carnage interrupts, informing him that his efforts will fail. Instead, Carnage sacrifices himself to cover the device with his own symbiote body, and the effort is successful in disabling the bomb. Spider-Man and the Astonishing Avengers now clash with the inverted Avengers, while Loki and Enchantress lure Thor away to another location. During the fight with Scarlet Witch, Doctor Doom resurrects Brother Voodoo, who uses the spirit of his brother Daniel Drumm to possess Scarlet Witch in an attempt to defeat her. Determined to recover Red Skull from Avengers Tower, Steve Rogers dons a new exoskeleton armor to confront his successor as Captain America, Sam Wilson, demanding that he stand down.

===== Chapter 3: Grinding Halt =====
Using the Red Skull's telepathy, Steve manages to distract Sam long enough to escape. After Captain America's failure to detain Rogers and the Skull, the inverted Avengers set out to the Avengers Mansion after defeated the inverted X-Men. As Apocalypse recovers from defeat, he is confronted by Zenpool's severed head, who convinces him to fight against the evil Avengers.

On the Moon, Loki is chased by Thor, where they come across Mjolnir, which had been left there since Thor became unworthy. Loki finds that he is worthy, picks up the hammer, and starts fighting with the power of Thor.

Back to the Avengers Mansion, Steve Rogers and Red Skull are attacked by the inverted Avengers, but right before Steve is killed by Sam, Apocalypse arrives and stalls for time while Red Skull is taken away. Apocalypse is eventually defeated, and the Avengers manage to catch up. Once again, Spider-Man and Sabretooth stall for time while Steve Rogers tries to get Red Skull to a Quinjet. Iron Man arrives, takes down the aircraft, and is prepared to kill Red Skull when Doctor Doom, Scarlet Witch (possessed by Daniel Drumm), Magneto, Doctor Voodoo, and Quicksilver arrive. Iron Man is incapacitated, and Doom, Daniel Drumm possessing Scarlet Witch, and Red Skull began another inversion spell. It is a success with every person reverted to their original state, except for Iron Man deploying a last-minute telepathic shield that protects himself, Havok, and Sabretooth.

=== Aftermath ===
In the wake of the conflict, New York City is being rebuilt. The press receives a video recorded by the inverted villains before the battle, in which they blamed the recent crisis on themselves as the "Axis of Evil." Steve Rogers recovers from the wounds. Iron Man retreats to Stark Island in San Francisco. Havok returns to the X-Men. Deadpool and Evan Sabahnur have gone into hiding. Thor is still dealing with the ramifications of no longer being worthy. Doctor Doom has abducted the Red Skull and holds him prisoner. The Avengers Unity Division has reformed. Peter Parker builds the rhinestone statue that Carnage requested before his death. Sabretooth is imprisoned, but writes that he promises to follow a better path in life similar to Wolverine now that he is permanently inverted.

== Titles involved ==
Title	Issue(s)
March to AXIS
Captain America (vol. 7)	#24
Loki: Agent of Asgard	#6–7
Magneto (vol. 3)	#9–10
Uncanny Avengers (vol. 1)	#24–25
Core miniseries
Avengers & X-Men: AXIS	#1–9
Tie-ins
All-New X-Factor	#15–17
Amazing X-Men (vol. 2)	#14
Avengers World	#15–16
AXIS: Carnage	#1–3
AXIS: Hobgoblin	#1–3
AXIS: Revolutions	#1–4
Captain America and the Mighty Avengers	#1–3
Deadpool (vol. 5)	#36–39
Inhuman	#9–10
Loki: Agent of Asgard	#8–9
Magneto (vol. 3)	#11–12
Nova (vol. 5)	#23–25
Wolverine & the X-Men (vol. 2)	#12

== Collected editions ==
Title	Material collected	Published date	ISBN
Uncanny Avengers Vol. 5: AXIS Prelude	Uncanny Avengers #23-25, Magneto #9-10, Uncanny Avengers Annual #1	January 2015	978-0785154259
Avengers & X-Men: AXIS	Avengers & X-Men: AXIS #1–9	March 17, 2015	978-0785190950
AXIS: Carnage & Hobgoblin	AXIS: Hobgoblin #1-3, AXIS: Carnage #1-3	March 2015	978-0785193111
AXIS: Revolutions	AXIS: Revolutions #1-4	June 2015	978-0785197683
All-New X-Factor Vol. 3: AXIS	All-New X-Factor #13-18	March 2015	978-0785188186
Deadpool Vol. 7: AXIS	Deadpool (vol. 5) #35-40	March 2015	978-0785192435
Inhuman Vol. 2: AXIS	Inhuman #7-11	April 2015	978-0785187806
Nova Vol. 5: AXIS	Nova (vol. 5) #23-27	April 2015	978-0785192411

== Reception ==
IGN gave the story and the overall graphic novel a negative review of 4.5/10 with the verdict "AXIS stands as one of the great disappointments of 2014. Despite the top-tier creators involved and the pedigree of Uncanny Avengers, this event just didn't come together. Only sporadic moments of fun crop up during the barrage of rushed art and poor characterization. And while the overall pacing does benefit slightly in this collected format, the hardcover's lack of extras and poor paper quality make the high cover price a hard pill to swallow."

== In other media ==
Zenpool appears in Deadpool & Wolverine as a member of the Deadpool Corps.
