= Daniel Drumm =

Publication information
- Publisher: Marvel Comics
- First appearance: Strange Tales #169 (September 1973)
- Created by: Len Wein; Gene Colan

In-story information
- Alter ego: Daniel Drumm
- Species: Ghost
- Notable aliases: Doctor Voodoo; Jack O'Lantern
- Abilities: Spirit possession; Extensive mystical knowledge

Daniel Drumm, also known as Doctor Voodoo and Jack O'Lantern, is a supervillain appearing in American comic books published by Marvel Comics, and the identical twin brother of Brother Voodoo.

== Publication history ==
Daniel Drumm first appeared in Strange Tales #169 (September 1973). This issue also featured the first appearance of Brother Voodoo. Drumm went on to star in guest appearances alongside Brother Voodoo in other Marvel titles such as Ghost Rider, Doctor Strange, The Tomb of Dracula, and Hulk. The character was also featured in the ongoing series Doctor Voodoo: Avenger of the Supernatural, written by Rick Remender which began in 2009 and ended in 2010. The series was cancelled after only five issues. The character was later featured in the Age of Heroes series.

== Fictional character biography ==
Daniel is the identical twin brother of Jericho Drumm (who would later become Brother Voodoo). They were raised by their Aunt Matilda, in an impoverished neighborhood in Port-au-Prince, Haiti. Jericho left to pursue an education in the United States, whilst Daniel remained in Haiti and studied magic, eventually earning the title Brother Voodoo. Twelve years later, Jericho learned that Daniel was ill, and returned to Haiti, where he learned that an evil occultist called Damballah had placed a curse on him. At midnight, Damballah used a voodoo doll resembling Daniel to kill him, but not before Jericho promised Daniel that he would stop Damballah. A witch doctor, Papa Jambo, used magic to link the two brothers' spirits together, and Jericho became the new Brother Voodoo, accompanied by his brother's ghost.

When the Eye of Agamotto leaves Doctor Strange, Jericho Drumm is chosen by the Eye to be the acting Sorcerer Supreme. Due to their shared bond, Daniel Drumm's ghost chooses to stand for his brother and help him in his new role. In this capacity, he joins Jericho and the Avengers in a battle against Agamotto. Despite their combined efforts, Strange, the Avengers and Daniel fail, forcing Jericho to sacrifice himself to take out Agamotto. Daniel survives the explosion and flees, blaming Strange for Jericho's death.

Daniel Drumm's ghost later returns, possessing various Avengers and killing other sorcerers in preparation for his final assault on Strange, convinced that Strange set his brother up to fail in his new role. Doctor Strange defeats him by using dark magic, regaining his position of Sorcerer Supreme as a result.

During the "AXIS" storyline, Doctor Doom resurrects the Drumm brothers to stop the inverted Scarlet Witch from destroying Latveria. Daniel still expresses hatred for the Avengers and is delighted to solve a problem they caused. He starts by possessing Scarlet Witch in an attempt to defeat her.

Following the "Civil War II" storyline, Daniel Drumm allies with the Hand and has them obtain Bruce Banner's corpse. When the Uncanny Avengers confront the Hand and Drumm, they are confronted by a resurrected Hulk.

== Powers and abilities ==
As Brother Voodoo, Drumm possessed many magical abilities. He can also merge his soul with his brother's body, which increases his speed, stamina and strength, and can also enter and possess the bodies of others. After Jericho's apparent death, Daniel Drumm lost his abilities that were tied to Jericho, but retained his ability of possession.

== Other versions ==
In the Earth-Chaos timeline, Daniel Drumm performed a dark ceremony with his brother Jericho watching. Daniel was apparently incinerated, only to return on the day before Halloween 13 years after the Chaos! event as Jack O'Lantern. He intends to bring about hell on Earth, making it Halloween every day. Jericho and the Supernaturals overcome his machinations, sending Daniel into another dimension.

== In other media ==
- Daniel Drumm appears in Doctor Strange, portrayed by Mark Anthony Brighton. This version is a member of the Masters of the Mystic Arts and guardian of the New York Sanctum before being killed by Kaecilius and succeeded by Stephen Strange.
- Daniel Drumm appears in Marvel Avengers Alliance as part of Jericho Drumm's Spirit Possession attack.
