= Jericho Drumm =

Fictional character in Marvel Comics

Jericho Drumm Brother Voodoo / Doctor Voodoo
- Jericho Drumm as Brother Voodoo / Doctor Voodoo with the ghost of his twin brother Daniel. Art by Art Adams.

Publication information
- Publisher: Marvel Comics
- First appearance: Strange Tales #169 (September 1973)
- Created by: Stan Lee; Len Wein; John Romita Sr.

In-story information
- Alter ego: Jericho Drumm
- Species: Human
- Team affiliations: Avengers Unity Division; Heroes for Hire; S.H.I.E.L.D. Paranormal Containment Unit; New Avengers; Savage Avengers; Strange Academy
- Notable aliases: Brother Voodoo, Doctor Voodoo, Sorcerer Supreme, Houngan Supreme, Lord of the Loa, He-Who-Has-Died-Twice, Voodoo Lord; Master of All Reptiles, the Voudoun, and the Spirit World
- Abilities: Extensive mystical knowledge; Superhuman strength; Spirit possession; Fire manipulation; Immunity to fire; Ability to generate mystic smoke to conceal his location, usually accompanied by the sound of drums that could also disorient opponents; Ability to command living things through hypnosis, with lesser control over people and greatest control over animals (even plants will obey him to their limited ability); Able to summon the spirit of his evil twin brother, Daniel, boosting his own physical strength; Able to speak to the Loa (spirits), asking favors; Medallion enhances his ability to tap into the Loa; Sorcerer Supreme and bearer of the Eye of Agamotto, the Cloak of Levitation and the Books of Knowledge

Dr. Jericho Drumm is a fictional character appearing in American comic books published by Marvel Comics. He first appeared in Strange Tales #169 (September 1973) as Brother Voodoo. The character was created by Marvel publisher Stan Lee, writer Len Wein, and artist John Romita Sr. Since replacing Doctor Strange as Sorcerer Supreme in New Avengers #53 (July 2009), the character has been referred to as Doctor Voodoo, a title originally assumed by his evil twin brother Daniel, whose ghost he controls.

== Concept and creation ==
Marvel Comics publisher Stan Lee proposed a heroic practitioner of Voodoo, and when editor-in-chief Roy Thomas suggested the name "Doctor Voodoo", Lee rebounded with the suggestion "Brother Voodoo". The task of fleshing out the character was then assigned to writer Len Wein and Marvel's art director John Romita Sr. Wein recounted, "We talked about the sense of the character. I designed the 'V' in the circle on the forehead in John's office." Romita did most of the costume design, while Wein's concept for Voodoo's character and powers drew partial inspiration from the Phantom.

== Publication history ==
Cover to Strange Tales #169 (September 1973). Art by John Romita Sr.

Brother Voodoo starred in his own feature in the Marvel comic-book series Strange Tales #169-173 (September 1973-April 1974), and in a backup feature in the black-and-white horror-comics magazine Tales of the Zombie #6 (July 1974, in a story continuing from Strange Tales #173) and #10 (March 1975). He has gone to guest-star very sporadically in other Marvel series, into the 21st century.

Voodoo's run in Strange Tales was written by co-creator Len Wein and drawn by Gene Colan. Though they worked on the series under the Marvel method, Wein left little for Colan to do in the way of plotting and pacing, writing plots which laid out the story page-by-page and often even panel-by-panel. According to comics journalist Michael Aushenker, Colan "took what would surely have been, in lesser hands, a very corny idea and infused it with an artistry which not only gave it flair and style but a kind of realism and straight-faced credibility that these otherwise ridiculously costumed individuals would actually appear to belong to our world." Though the letters pages for these issues feature angry letters from religious readers, Wein has said this should not be taken as an indication that Voodoo was controversial, since Marvel staff often stacked letters pages with the most extreme responses they could find as a form of publicity.

Brother Voodoo's name was changed to "Doctor Voodoo" when he replaced Doctor Strange as Sorcerer Supreme during the "Dark Reign" storyline. He was the second comic book character to bear the name; an earlier Dr. Voodoo had been published by Fawcett Comics as a back-up feature in Whiz Comics in the 1940s. The newly renamed Marvel character received his own eponymous ongoing series written by Rick Remender, Doctor Voodoo: Avenger of the Supernatural, which was canceled after five issues.

== Fictional character biography ==
Returning to his native Haiti after 12 years of education and practice as an accredited psychologist in the United States, Jericho Drumm discovers that his twin brother Daniel Drumm, the local houngan, is dying, a victim of a voodoo sorcerer who claims to be possessed by the spirit of the serpent-god Damballah. Just before he dies, Daniel makes his brother vow to visit Daniel's mentor, Papa Jambo. Jericho does, and becomes Jambo's student. After studying under Jambo for several weeks, Jericho gains a greater mastery of voodoo practices than his own brother, becoming a houngan in his own right. Jambo then performs a rite that summons Daniel's spirit from the dead and joins it with Jericho's own. Having fashioned a worthy successor, Jambo dies.

Taking the name "Brother Voodoo", Jericho challenges the priest (who goes by the same name as his god, Damballah) and his cult. With the help of Daniel's spirit possessing one of the cult members, Jericho removes Damballah's artifact of power (wangal), causing Damballah's snakes to turn on him and evidently destroying Damballah's cult. Voodoo becomes Haiti's houngan supreme and champion, and establishes a sprawling mansion as a base of operations. He places the wangal in a safe, its combination known only to Voodoo and his servant Bambu.

Doctor Voodoo as the Sorcerer Supreme in New Avengers #53 (July 2009). Art by Billy Tan and Matt Banning.

Brother Voodoo eventually succumbs to the lure of power that Damballah's wangal represented. The god Damballah takes over Voodoo's soul, burns down the mansion and apparently kills Bambu. He travels to New York City to attempt to take over the mind and body of Doctor Strange, who frees Voodoo of Damballah's influence. He later becomes involved with the supernatural 'Howling Commandos" operation of the espionage agency S.H.I.E.L.D.

=== Sorcerer Supreme and apparent death ===
The Eye of Agamotto leaves Doctor Strange after showing him and the New Avengers nearly thirty candidates who would possibly replace Strange. Because he comes into possession of the Eye, Drumm becomes the new Sorcerer Supreme.

Aided by the New Avengers, he eventually battles the entity Agamotto itself to prevent Agamotto from retrieving the eye and gaining the power to rule Earth's dimension, and appears to sacrifice himself to destroy Agamotto and the Eye.

=== Return ===
During the AXIS storyline, Doctor Doom makes a Faustian deal to resurrect Brother Voodoo, reasoning that he and Daniel are the only ones who can stop the inverted Scarlet Witch from destroying Latveria. The spirit of Daniel Drumm subsequently possesses Scarlet Witch to undo the spell that inverted the morality of the heroes and villains. He is offered a full-time role in Steve Rogers's Uncanny Avengers.

== Powers and abilities ==
Brother Voodoo possesses numerous mystical and quasi-physical powers derived from the Loa, the spirit-gods of voodoo. He can easily enter into a trance-like state in which he does not feel the heat from fire and his skin becomes impervious to burning. He can also control flame and lower life forms. Voodoo can mystically create smoke accompanied by the sound of drums. The smoke conceals his presence while he is able to see through it. He has the ability to command certain living things by a mystic sort of hypnotism, most effective over animals and plants. He can summon the Loa to request transport for himself and others instantaneously if they deem it necessary to his mission.

Brother Voodoo can also summon the spirit of his brother Daniel Drumm from within his body, doubling his own strength. He can send the spirit to possess another person's body and then has total control over their actions.

Brother Voodoo also has more mundane escapist talents, once entering Strange's building, not through magic, but through the chimney. He has extensive knowledge of voudoun (voodoo) thanks to training by Papa Jambo, as well as conventional medicine and psychology with a Ph.D. in psychology.

He wears a mystic medallion that serves as a focus of his powers and as a focus for his contact with his personal loas. He has, at times, employed conventional firearms.

Brother Voodoo's time spent as the new Sorcerer Supreme had bestowed upon him not only the power of the Eye of Agamotto, but also the Cloak of Levitation and the Books of Knowledge, which were formerly in the possession of Doctor Strange.

== Other versions ==
=== Avengers of the Undead ===
An alternate version of Brother Voodoo appears as the leader of the Avengers of the Undead, the team of Avengers from Earth-666.

=== Fred Hembeck ===
Cartoonist Fred Hembeck regularly featured the Brother Voodoo character in the promotional magazine Marvel Age, beginning with issue #14 (May 1984). He generally showed him as a lame character trying to get his own series. Hembeck also introduced Sister Voodoo as his long-lost sister and Voodoo Chile, her child.

=== Marvel Zombies: Dead Days ===
An alternate universe variant of Brother Voodoo from Earth-2149 appears in the Marvel Zombies series.

=== Supernaturals ===
The miniseries Supernaturals (October 1998), written by Brian Pulido, featured an alternate-universe Brother Voodoo leading a team composed of Ghost Rider, Werewolf by Night, Gargoyle, Black Cat and Satana, to fight a mystically powered Jack O'Lantern.

=== What If? Featuring X-Men: Age of Apocalypse ===
Brother Voodoo was one of the main characters in an alternate Age of Apocalypse, first seen in the February 2007 What If? Featuring X-Men: Age of Apocalypse one-shot. In this issue, Voodoo replaces Doctor Strange as Sorcerer Supreme. He battles Dormammu and helps the heroes take down Apocalypse, though Jericho himself is killed by Dormammu when the Eye of Agamotto is taken away from him.

== Collected editions ==
Title	Material collected	Year	ISBN
Essential Marvel Horror Vol. 2	Brother Voodoo stories from Strange Tales #169–173, Tales of the Zombie #6, 10, Marvel Team-Up #24 and material from Supernatural Thrillers #5, 7–15, Haunt of Horror #2-5, Monsters Unleashed #11, Strange Tales #174, 176–177, Marvel Two-In-One #11, 18, 33, Marvel Chillers #1-2, Marvel Two-in-One #33, Dead of Night #11, Marvel Spotlight #26	November 2008	978-0785130673
Marvel Masterworks: Brother Voodoo	Strange Tales #169-173, Marvel Team-Up #24, Werewolf by Night #39-41, Marvel Two-In-One #41, Doctor Strange #41, Moon Knight #21, material from Tales of the Zombie #6, 10, Tomb of Dracula #34-37, Werewolf by Night #38, Marvel Super-Heroes #1, Doctor Strange #16-17, 20	June 2021	978-1302929237
Doctor Voodoo: Avenger of the Supernatural	Doctor Voodoo: Avenger of the Supernatural #1-5	May 2010	978-0785144090

== In other media ==
=== Film ===
In 2003, the Sci Fi Channel announced it was developing a live-action television film and backdoor pilot called Brother Voodoo, based on the character. Hans Rodionoff was announced to write the screenplay, with Ben Silverman, Avi Arad, and Rick Ungar producing the film. However, nothing came of development afterwards and the project was abandoned.

=== Video games ===
- Brother Voodoo makes a cameo appearance in Doctor Strange's ending in Ultimate Marvel vs. Capcom 3.
- Brother Voodoo appears as a playable character in Marvel: Avengers Alliance.
- Brother Voodoo appears as a playable character in Lego Marvel's Avengers as part of the "Doctor Strange" DLC.
- Doctor Voodoo appears as a playable character in Marvel: Contest of Champions.
- Doctor Voodoo appears as a playable character in Marvel: Future Fight.
