= Scarlet Witch =

Marvel Comics fictional character

Wanda Maximoff Scarlet Witch
- Various incarnations of Scarlet Witch, as depicted on a variant cover art from Avengers Forever #1 (December 2021). Art by Russell Dauterman.

Publication information
- Publisher: Marvel Comics
- First appearance: The X-Men #4 (March 1964)
- Created by: Stan Lee (writer); Jack Kirby (artist)

In-story information
- Species: Human mutant (originally); Human mutate (retconned)
- Place of origin: Mount Wundagore, Transia (originally); Serbia (retconned)
- Team affiliations: Avengers; Brotherhood of Mutants; Defenders; Force Works; Lady Liberators
- Partnerships: Quicksilver; Vision
- Notable aliases: Scarlet Witch; Wanda Frank; Queen of Chaos; Empress of Magic
- Abilities: Superhuman genes allow energy and reality manipulation and powerful access to magical energies, such as chaos magic; Telekinesis; Mind controlling and manipulation; Probability manipulation; Ability to sense magic; Spell casting, witchcraft and black magic; Flight

Scarlet Witch is a character appearing in American comic books published by Marvel Comics. Created by artist Jack Kirby and writer Stan Lee, the character first appeared in The X-Men #4 (cover dated March 1964). Introduced as an antagonist in Magneto's Brotherhood of Evil Mutants alongside her twin brother, Quicksilver, Scarlet Witch later reformed and joined the Avengers beginning with The Avengers #16 (May 1965), becoming part of the team's second generation.

Scarlet Witch is the superhero persona of Wanda Maximoff. Initially depicted as a mutant with the ability to manipulate probability, the character was later expanded as a powerful sorceress capable of wielding chaos magic and altering the fabric of reality. She eventually married the android Vision, and storylines involving their relationship and the magical birth and later loss of their twin sons became major elements of later crossovers such as Avengers: Disassembled and House of M. Her sons, Wiccan and Speed, would later return as teenage heroes.

Throughout Marvel continuity she was long described as the mutant daughter of Magneto and a Romani woman, Magda. Later stories introduced a retcon clarifying that she and her brother were subjects of genetic experimentation by the High Evolutionary, meaning she was never truly a mutant despite earlier "X-gene" tests indicating otherwise. Wanda’s parentage has shifted in different accounts: she was at times said to be the child of the Golden Age heroes Whizzer and Miss America, before later stories established her as the daughter of the Roma sorceress Natalya Maximoff, a previous Scarlet Witch, and the niece of Django Maximoff and Marya Maximoff.

Scarlet Witch is frequently cited as one of the most powerful and influential figures within the Marvel Universe. Elizabeth Olsen portrays Wanda Maximoff in the Marvel Cinematic Universe, making the character's live-action debut in Avengers: Age of Ultron (2015). She went on to play key roles in Captain America: Civil War (2016), Avengers: Infinity War (2018) and Avengers: Endgame (2019), with her most prominent appearances in WandaVision (Disney+ series; 2021) and Doctor Strange in the Multiverse of Madness (2022). Olsen makes a cameo appearance in the series VisionQuest (2026). The character has also been noted by commentators as one of the most prominent Romani characters in mainstream superhero comics.

== Publication history ==
=== 1960s ===
The Scarlet Witch and her twin brother Quicksilver debuted as a part of the Brotherhood of Evil Mutants in X-Men #4 (March 1964). They were depicted as reluctant villains, only wanting safety from persecution and uninterested in team leader Magneto's plans for global domination. The Scarlet Witch is depicted as calm and submissive, like many female comic book characters of the time.

As revealed on the back of a splash page of The X-Men issue 4, Kirby considered several names for the character, including "Jinx", "Witch Woman", "The Sorceress", "Evil Eye", and "Miss Witch". Her costume was composed of a bathing suit with straps, opera gloves, short boots, a leotard covering her body, a superhero cape, and a wimple, all of which were colored in shades of red. She was created by Stan Lee and Jack Kirby.

Lee and Kirby also produced the Avengers comic book, composed of Marvel's most prominent solo heroes at the time. Save for Captain America, Lee and Kirby eventually had all the Avengers leave to focus on their individual careers, replacing them with former villains from other comics who did not have a series of their own: the Scarlet Witch and Quicksilver from X-Men, and Hawkeye from Iron Man's adventures in Tales of Suspense. The team first appeared in The Avengers #16 and known as "Cap's Kooky Quartet". Although common in later years, such a wide-scale change in the roster of a superhero group was completely unprecedented (usually, superhero teams only exchanged one or two members at a time rather than almost the entire roster at once). Lee and the following Avengers writer, Roy Thomas, hinted that other Avengers were romantically interested in the Scarlet Witch. The twins later leave the team after a crossover with the X-Men.

=== 1970s ===
Some years later, Thomas brought Wanda and Pietro back into the team and started a long-running romantic relationship between the Scarlet Witch and the android hero Vision, thinking it would help with the series's character development. He elected those characters because they were only published in the Avengers comic book and did not star in solo adventures, so relationship drama in the series would not interfere with stories in other publications. Their first kiss took place during the Kree–Skrull War arc. Thomas also added Hawkeye into a love triangle with both characters, eventually having the archer realize that Vision and Wanda were truly in love. A fan of Golden Age heroes, Roy Thomas often found ways to integrate the older characters into modern-day stories. In Giant-Size Avengers #1 (August 1974), Quicksilver and the Scarlet Witch are revealed to be the children of Golden Age superheroes Whizzer (Robert Frank) and Miss America (Madeline Joyce).

Steve Englehart succeeded Thomas as the writer of Avengers. He gave Wanda a more assertive personality and removed the highly-protective Quicksilver from the team. In 1974, Englehart expanded Wanda's powers by having her learn witchcraft from Agatha Harkness. The Vision and the Scarlet Witch married in Giant-Size Avengers #4 (June 1975), the end of the Celestial Madonna story arc. In 1979, Wanda learns Bob Frank and Madeline Joyce are not her and Pietro's parents.

=== 1980s ===
Wanda then stars in the four-issue limited series The Vision and the Scarlet Witch (1982–83), by writer Bill Mantlo and penciler Rick Leonardi. In this limited series, Magneto was retconned to be Wanda and Pietro's father. Englehart returned to the characters with penciler Richard Howell for a second limited series, in which the Scarlet Witch gets pregnant by magical means and delivers twin sons, William and Thomas. Englehart took over as writer for the spin-off series West Coast Avengers, later adding Vision and Wanda to the team.

John Byrne later replaced Englehart on the series (which was renamed Avengers West Coast). He wrote and illustrated the controversial "Vision Quest" storyline, where the Vision is dismantled and turned into an emotionless being who later even refuses the chance to regain his emotions (leading to the annulment of his marriage to the Scarlet Witch). After this, Byrne retconned William and Thomas to be magical constructs created by Wanda experiencing a "hysterical" pregnancy and then subconsciously using her magic to create the children. At most, Wanda's magic should have only created illusions, but the twins were seemingly given life because Wanda unknowingly empowered them with pieces of the essence of the demon lord Mephisto. Mephisto later absorbs the children into himself, creating a bond to Wanda's magic and soul. To sever the connection, Agatha Harkness removes Wanda's memory of the children. Around this same time, Wanda is brainwashed twice by different villains, first to become a servant for the parasitic life form That Which Endures and then to be a "Bride of Set" during the 1989 storyline "Atlantis Attacks". Although her mind is restored both times, the repeated trauma renders her catatonic. At this time, the Vision decides he cannot help Wanda or the Avengers West Coast and returns to the NYC team.

=== 1990s ===
Byrne's next storyline involved Wanda becoming a villain yet again, now displaying greater and more focused power than before, and rejoining Magneto. Writers Roy and Dann Thomas took over Avengers West Coast. They revealed that Wanda's new personality, attacks on the Avengers and increase in power were all due to manipulations by the time villain Immortus, who had been seen watching the Avengers during some of Byrne's issues. The storyline disclosed Wanda is a "nexus being", a person who greatly affects timelines. By influencing Wanda to tap into her nexus energies, Immortus caused her increase in power and the creation of the children. Immortus wishes to use her to warp reality, but Wanda comes to her senses and gives up her nexus energies. Roy and Dann Thomas then revealed that a side effect of this caused Wanda to remember her children and temporarily lose her powers. The website Women in Refrigerators interviewed Englehart about these changes, who said he did not like them.

Multiple stories after the Immortus storyline featured Wanda remembering and mourning her children, and even judging teammate Spider-Woman for bringing her child along on an Avengers assignment. Roy Thomas later wrote the short story "A Study in Scarlet", with art by Al Bigley and Mike DeCarlo, published in Avengers West Coast Annual #7 (1992). The short story featured Wanda reflecting on how she was glad Agatha Harkness's memory-blocking spell only lasted a short time, as she appreciates having had the chance to mourn her children properly. She then accidentally creates a window into another timeline where she sees a version of events where she, Vision, and the children remained together. This brings her comfort and helps her feel she can cope with the loss better.

Following the Immortus storyline, Wanda is a more serious-minded character, wishing to atone for turning against the Avengers twice in a short amount of time and endangering reality. When she regains her powers, her hexes are initially more difficult to control and only on the power level she had when she first joined the Avengers. To compensate, she practices the magic Harkness taught her. In 1994, Avengers West Coast ended, and several of its team members reformed as an independent group led by Wanda in the series Force Works. The new title ran for only a couple of years. In 1994, a Scarlet Witch four-issue limited series was written by Andy Lanning and Dan Abnett, and pencilled by John Higgins.

Marvel Comics was nearing bankruptcy in 1996. The Avengers and other titles were relaunched in a new continuity and line of books called Heroes Reborn, outsourced to the studios of Jim Lee and Rob Liefeld, the latter of whom worked with the relaunched Avengers title and included the Scarlet Witch in the team, making her a sorceress with no mutant abilities, as the Heroes Reborn reality did not make any reference to any people born with mutant powers. After Marvel renegotiated the terms of the deal, Liefeld was replaced with writer Walter Simonson and penciler Michael Ryan. The project was a success, boosting the sales of the titles and bringing Marvel Comics out of bankruptcy. The project ended after a year, and the Avengers were returned to the mainstream Marvel reality. The Avengers series relaunched again, now under Kurt Busiek and George Pérez. Pérez increased the volume of curls in her hair and gave her a more detailed costume with Romani influences, though he conceded that other artists would find it irksome. Later when he became the artist on Avengers, Alan Davis asked to change the design because it did not work well with his simpler, less detailed style. During Busiek's run Wanda once again becomes a powerful sorceress by tapping into the energy of "chaos magic". Busiek said that her true mutant power is to tap into magical energy fields and manipulate them, just as Magneto taps into and manipulates electromagnetic fields.

=== 2000s ===
Marvel decided to relaunch the Avengers series again, with a new roster, headquarters, atmosphere, and creative direction. To promote the change and gain reader interest, the inciting event was depicted in the 2004 "Avengers Disassembled" storyline by Brian Michael Bendis and with art by David Finch. In the story, a remark by the Wasp causes Wanda to remember her children (how and when Wanda once again lost the memories of her children is not explained). She suddenly relives the trauma of their loss and feels betrayed by the Avengers, both for allowing Harkness to cloud her memories and for being unable to save her children from Mephisto. Emotionally overwhelmed and simultaneously experiencing a drastic increase in power, Wanda kills Harkness and causes the Avengers to suffer their "worst day" by altering the minds of She-Hulk and Iron Man, and causing simulations of the villain Ultron and the alien Kree to attack. This leads to the apparent deaths of different characters and the destruction of Avengers Mansion. Wanda is discovered to be the culprit and stopped, after which she falls into a coma. The Avengers disband, then reform in New Avengers. To explain her sudden increase in power, the sorcerer Doctor Strange says Wanda's actual mutant power is to reshape reality.

The Scarlet Witch as she appears in Avengers vs. X-Men #0 (March 2012). Art by Frank Cho.

Wanda was seen again in the limited series House of M, creating an alternate version of Earth. When Earth's heroes defeat her, she causes "M-Day", removing the powers of most mutants on Earth. She then appeared in the Young Avengers follow-up series, Avengers: The Children's Crusade (2010–2012), which retconned Avengers Disassembled by revealing Wanda's extreme actions and enhanced power levels during recent stories were the result of tapping into an enormous source of energy that then corrupted her, similar to when she was possessed by Chthon, brainwashed by That Which Endures, and corrupted by Immortus. This was now the explanation as to how she was able to warp reality and why she would no longer be that powerful, and partially exonerated her from her actions against the Avengers and during M-Day. Wanda was again portrayed as someone who wanted to atone for her past, accepting partial responsibility rather than completely blaming outside influences, allying herself with Doctor Doom. The series Young Avengers introduced the characters Wiccan and Speed, who were later revealed to be reincarnations of Wanda's children William and Thomas.

=== 2010s ===
The Scarlet Witch is a regular character in Uncanny Avengers (2012), beginning with issue #1. The 2014 AXIS crossover retconned the character's parentage again, revealing Magneto is not her biological father. In 2015, the series Uncanny Avengers revealed that she and Pietro received superpowers due to the experiments of the High Evolutionary rather than being mutants. This plot twist was published at a time when Marvel Studios and 20th Century Fox had a legal dispute over the film rights to Scarlet Witch and Quicksilver, who were going to be introduced in the 2015 film Avengers: Age of Ultron.

Under the All-New, All-Different Marvel branding, the character received her own ongoing solo series from late 2015 to 2017, written by James Robinson and illustrated by a rotating team of artists. Robinson explained he was influenced by the work of Matt Fraction and David Aja on the Hawkeye title: "... they managed to stay true to the character in the Avengers while also taking it in a fresh direction, so it wasn't just that same Avengers character doing solo things, which I don't think ever really works for any sustained period of time for any of those second-tier characters." The 2015 Scarlet Witch series has Wanda investigating supernatural threats with Agatha Harkness at her side. Wanda discovers her adopted parents are actually her biological aunt and uncle, and that her bloodline includes many magic-users who identify with the color red. Now feeling more secure in her identity, Wanda returns to the Avengers.

=== 2020s ===
Scarlet Witch was murdered during the Hellfire Gala (2021), and resurrected in the subsequent limited series X-Men: Trial of Magneto. Writer Leah Williams commented that the intended focus of the series is on Scarlet Witch and rehabilitating "Wanda's image with the rest of the mutants on Krakoa"; Williams stated that "her goal is not to write the next defining Magneto story but to write an 'empathy engine', as a Wanda sympathiser, to authentically tell a story that's going to be about healing and catharsis". Following her resurrection, Scarlet Witch updated the Krakoan resurrection protocols so that mutants who were not backed up by Cerebro could now be resurrected. This added twenty million mutants to the queue, including everyone who died on Genosha, and led to the Scarlet Witch being called the Redeemer on Krakoa. In September 2022, Marvel announced a Scarlet Witch solo series which follows the events of Trial of Magneto; it premiered in January 2023.

== Fictional character biography ==
Throughout the generations, different members of the Maximoff family, a Romani bloodline, are born with a strong talent for magic. Several members of the family associate their magic with scarlet, calling themselves Scarlet Witch or Scarlet Warlock, just as certain other sorcerers choose to identify with complex rather than basic colors. One Scarlet Warlock has two children, his daughter Natalya Maximoff, a powerful magic-user, and his son Django Maximoff, a medicine man and storyteller whose latent magic abilities bring life to his strange puppets. Among Natalya's people, red is considered a color of bad luck. Natalya enjoys this and happily adopts the title Scarlet Witch, believing it implies misfortune for her enemies. As the Scarlet Witch, she spends years fighting a variety of mystical enemies that threaten humanity, sometimes aided by allies such as the centuries-old witch Agatha Harkness of New Salem. Her brother Django remains with their tribe, making a home in Serbia with his wife Marya. Django and Marya have twins, Ana and Mateo, but the children tragically die while still young.

While still living in Serbia, Natalya has twin children, Pietro Maximoff and Wanda Marya Maximoff. The demonic Elder God Chthon witnesses Wanda's birth and infuses her with some of his own magical energy in hopes to one day use her as a host vessel. While she battles more villains and menaces, Natalya leaves her children in the care of her brother and sister-in-law, who now live with other Romany in Novi Pazar, Serbia. The area is soon attacked by the Knights of Wundagore. Their leader and creator Herbert Wyndham, known as the High Evolutionary, wants to experiment on children who have the genetics to possibly achieve great superhuman power. Knowing Wanda and Pietro are children of a powerful witch, a local priest gives the twins to the High Evolutionary to stop the attacks. The twins are taken to the High Evolutionary's base at Mount Wundagore in the neighboring country of Transia. According to the High Evolutionary, his experiments allows the twins the potential for power later (and wrongly makes them appear to be mutants), but the results are not as impressive as he desires.

While the children are still at Mount Wundagore, they are attended by Bova, a cow uplifted into an anthropomorphic form by the High Evolutionary who acts as a nurse. Later on, the retired superhero the Whizzer (Robert Frank) and his pregnant wife Miss America (Madeline Joyce Frank) arrive at Mount Wundagore. Madeline goes into labor, and both baby and mother die. Hoping to ease the suffering of her husband, and believing the children would be better raised away from Mount Wundagore, Bova tells Frank the twins are his children. Overwhelmed by the death of his wife, Frank leaves rather than adopt the children.

Tracking down her children, Natalya Maximoff attacks Wundagore and fights the High Evolutionary's forces to a stand-still. During the attack, she is killed by the father of Wanda and Pietro. Either because he has no more use for the children or is impressed by the heroism of their mother, the High Evolutionary tracks down Django and Marya Maximoff and gives them the twins. Django and Marya decide not to explain the twins' true heritage to them until they are old enough to accept their real mother was a sorceress who died in battle (the Maximoffs mistakenly believe the High Evolutionary's forces killed her). Before the twins reach their tenth birthday, they develop superhuman abilities, with Pietro using superhuman speed and Wanda casting minor hexes that cause a variety of effects, such as momentarily moving or levitating objects.

Locals who hold prejudice against the Roma people hear rumors of the twins' powers. After Django steals bread to feed his family, the locals attack the Roma tribe, burning down their homes. The Maximoff wagon is set on fire with Marya still inside and Django is beaten by multiple attackers. Wanda and Pietro flee, believing Django and Marya are dead. Unknown to them, Marya survives the fire, though her body and face suffer serious burns and scarring. Django, mourning the loss of yet more children and overwhelmed by guilt that he could not protect Marya, suffers a break from reality. He convinces himself Wanda and Pietro were his biological children Ana and Mateo, and that Marya is dead. He starts a new, solitary life, while Marya returns to Serbia.

Repressing much of the memory of their trauma, Wanda and Pietro travel through Transia as homeless orphans for years. During this time, the aggressive Pietro becomes obsessively protective of his sister, even referring to her as his "little sister" because she is 13 minutes younger. Wanda's "hex power" becomes focused enough that she can instantly cause bad luck for enemies. When the twins are in their late teens, Wanda uses her power to save a child. This leads to locals accusing her of witchcraft and attempting to burn her alive at a stake. Having heard reports of the twins, the mutant terrorist Magneto arrives and saves her. Learning from the Maximoffs that their powers emerged naturally and weren't the result of an outside force (as far as they knew), Magneto concludes Wanda and Pietro are mutants.

Telling them they now owe him a debt for his rescue, Magneto makes them his first recruits for the original Brotherhood of Evil Mutants (later simply called the Brotherhood of Mutants). Pietro adopts the code name Quicksilver, while Wanda assumes the name Scarlet Witch. Initially, it is indicated she gets the name from an accusation shouted by a person hoping to burn her at the stake. Later, Wanda reveals the name came into her mind when she first realized she had powers, a sign she was inheriting her mother's magical abilities. During their missions alongside Magneto against the heroic X-Men, the twins only help reluctantly. At times, they work to prevent the X-Men and Magneto's human targets from being seriously harmed or killed. Wanda also deals with the unwanted advances of teammates Toad and Mastermind.

=== The Avengers ===
When Magneto is abducted by the Stranger, the original Brotherhood dissolves and the twins declare their debt now paid. Wishing to atone for their crimes and help stop threats like Magneto, Quicksilver and the Scarlet Witch contact the Avengers. At the time, the group's founding roster is ready to go their separate ways. Accepting the twins, as well as the archer Hawkeye who had been manipulated into committing crimes and fighting Iron Man in the past, Captain America becomes leader of this new Avengers team. The group is jokingly called by some "Cap's Kooky Quartet".

Wanda is accidentally shot on a mission against Magneto. Enraged, Quicksilver leaves the Avengers with his wounded sister and rejoins Magneto. After a pair of encounters with the X-Men, the twins reaffirm that they do not believe in Magneto's cause or methods and leave him.

After Arkon kidnaps Wanda, Quicksilver returns to the Avengers for help. After her rescue, the twins rejoin the team. Scarlet Witch then falls in love with Vision. Initially guarded because he fears he is a soulless machine and cannot have a relationship with a human, Vision later reveals his feelings for Wanda. Quicksilver objects due to his belief that a "robot" is not capable of genuine love, while Hawkeye resents the romance because he has feelings for Wanda himself. Despite this, the entire team (except for Quicksilver) comes to approve of the pairing.

Wanda and Pietro meet Robert Frank, who reveals he believes them to be his children. Hearing Frank describe how his wife died in childbirth at Mount Wundagore, Wanda believes his story and for some time afterward refers to herself as Wanda Frank. Later on, Django Maximoff comes to America and tells Wanda and Pietro they are his children Ana and Mateo. The twins journey with Django to Wundagore. There, Wanda is temporarily possessed by Chthon, who claims he witnessed her birth and imbued some of his own magical energy into her so she could be a host later on. Meanwhile, Quicksilver meets Bova who confirms that neither the Maximoffs nor the Franks are the twins' parents. Bova claims she delivered Wanda and Pietro herself when a pregnant woman named Magda came to Wundagore after fleeing her dangerous husband, a vengeful man with superhuman abilities. At the end of the adventure, Wanda is freed from her possession and Django dies. Mourning him and wishing to honor that he and his wife raised them for a time, Wanda and Pietro drop the Frank surname and use Maximoff as their last name again. Realizing she has a talent for magic, Wanda becomes an apprentice to the sorceress Agatha Harkness, gaining greater control over her hexes and learning true magic.

The Scarlet Witch and the Vision get married. While the team approves, Quicksilver still objects and some members of the public are angered by the event, believing neither a mutant nor an android can legally be married. Some time later, the two take a leave of absence from the Avengers in order to establish a life for themselves outside of the team and spend some time focusing on their relationship. The two move to a house in the suburbs of Leonia, New Jersey. The couple meet Robert Frank again, who learns Wanda and Pietro are not his children. He then dies trying to protect Wanda, Vision, and his true son Nuklo from his old enemy Isbisa.

Around this time, Magneto attempts once again to track down what happened to Magda, his wife who fled from him years before. Magneto finds Bova, who tells him a woman named Magda arrived years ago, pregnant with twins. After the children Wanda and Pietro were born, Magda then fled. Concluding Quicksilver and the Scarlet Witch are his own children, that Magda must have been pregnant when she fled him, Magneto leaves. Shortly after the birth of Pietro's daughter Luna, Magneto visits the child and tells Quicksilver and Scarlet Witch that he is their father, asking to start a new relationship with them. Wanda and Pietro are uneasy about the revelation that Magneto is their father, but accept his claim. Later, prejudiced neighbors burn down Vision and Wanda's house, and they take up residence in Avengers Mansion again, rejoining the team.

When the alien computer ISAAC takes over Vision's personality, he becomes corrupt and takes over international computer and security systems as part of a plan for global domination. He is restored to his proper mind, now having a stronger sense of identity, deciding he is not a copy of Wonder Man but more like a twin. The US government insists on confining Vision and studying him so he cannot be taken over by another computer again, claiming that as an Avenger he must comply with orders from the US government. To ensure his freedom, Wanda and Vision quit the Avengers again, returning to a life as private citizens and purchasing a new home in Leonia. Vision then reveals his stronger sense of identity has also led to a desire to have a family with Wanda. While he hopes her magic can make this possible, Wanda is doubtful.

The Vision and Wanda are kidnapped by the residents of New Salem, who reveal they recently killed Agatha Harkness. During a magical ceremony, the corrupt leader of New Salem is defeated, causing excess magical energy to go wild. Using Harkness's lessons of tapping into different magical sources, Wanda taps into the excess energy and channels it away safely. Before she finishes, she hears Harkness's spirit tell her to use the incredible magical power while she is still connected to it. Instinctively, Wanda uses it to make herself pregnant. Months later, Wanda's old Brotherhood of Mutants teammate Toad attacks Leonia in order to take her as his bride. Seeing she is now eight months pregnant, he is repulsed and Wanda defeats him. Wanda later goes into labor and is attended by the physician and sorcerer Doctor Strange, who is surprised when she gives birth to twins. The boys are named Thomas (for Phineas Thomas Horton, the scientist who created the android Human Torch) and William (in reference to Wonder Man's real name, Simon Williams). Eventually, the Vision and Scarlet Witch relocate their family to Los Angeles, joining the new West Coast Avengers.

=== Loss of marriage and children ===
Believing the Vision may have downloaded state secrets when he temporarily had international power and could do so again, various governments agree to a joint operation. Operatives kidnap and dismantle Vision, wiping out his personality. Vision is then rebuilt, his red-colored skin now chalk-white. While his memories are mostly restored, he is now without emotions. Scarlet Witch hopes to restore his personality with Wonder Man's help, but he refuses due to his own secret feelings for Wanda and his uneasiness of choosing to create a copy of his emotions in someone else. Wanda seeks out help in restoring Vision's emotions but becomes corrupted by a parasitic life form called That Which Endures. Under its influence, Wanda turns against the Avengers. That Which Endures is then defeated and Wanda's mind restored.

Agatha Harkness arrives (explaining that true witches have learned to protect themselves from burning and other methods non-witches have used to kill them) and reveals Thomas and William are not real but the result of Wanda suffering a "hysterical pregnancy" that influenced her magic and created constructs. Wanda's powers cannot create life, so the "souls" of the twins were drawn from scattered pieces of the demon lord Mephisto, whose power had been split into several pieces after a battle with the powerful Franklin Richards, son of Reed and Sue Richards of the Fantastic Four. Mephisto arrives and re-absorbs the life energies of the children into himself, restoring his power and seemingly wiping them from existence. Realizing this has created a connection between the demon lord and the Scarlet Witch, Harkness temporarily removes Wanda's memories of her children, causing a mental shock to Mephisto that allows his defeat. Vision suspected the children were only magical projections and had attempted to discuss it with Wanda, but she refused to listen.

Years later, the Young Avengers team is created, including Billy Kaplan in its ranks, a teenager first called "Asgardian" and then later "Wiccan". After the team meets teenage hero Tommy Shepherd, who calls himself Speed, Billy correctly concludes he and Tommy are the reincarnated twins of Wanda and Vision. The story Avengers: The Children's Crusade indicates Mephisto lied to Wanda about the nature of her children, revealing William and Thomas were "lost souls" who were raised by Wanda and Vision after her magic allowed them to be physically born, only to then have their lives "taken" by Mephisto.

=== Nexus being ===
Immediately after losing her children, Wanda is brainwashed again, this time to become a "Bride of Set". She is freed from control but becomes catatonic, apparently as a result of recent traumas. Believing he cannot help Wanda and is not needed with the west coast team, Vision returns to the NYC-based Avengers team. Wonder Man offers the use of his brainwaves to restore Vision's emotions, but the android refuses, believing he is now a separate person from whom he was before and not wishing to accept a copy of someone else's identity. Days after Vision leaves, Wanda becomes responsive again, now with incredibly enhanced power and a personality that hates humans and delights in suffering. She attacks the Avengers, sexually assaults Wonder Man, and rejoins with Magneto (who himself recently has returned to his terrorist ways after spending some time working with the X-Men). Investigating Wanda's change in personality and power level, Agatha Harkness discovers both changes are caused by Immortus. Realizing Wanda is a nexus being, a person whose very existence affects probability and timelines, Immortus hopes to use this great power for himself. For years, he has manipulated Wanda's life, hoping to use her as his pawn so he can increase his power.

As the Avengers battle Immortus, Harkness reminds Wanda of her love for her friends and family. Realizing she has been manipulated, Wanda gives up the nexus energies inside her. No longer a nexus being, her mind and full memories of Thomas and William are restored. Defeated and no longer having use for the Scarlet Witch without her nexus energy, Immortus leaves. Wanda returns to the Avengers but is now seemingly powerless. With Vision still unable to feel or reciprocate love, he and Wanda have their marriage annulled. Soon afterward, Wonder Man makes his romantic feelings for Wanda clear, but she tells him she only sees him as a friend. This leads to resentment and tension for some time.

Weeks after releasing her reality-warping Nexus energy and being freed from Immortus's control, Wanda's original hex power returns when Pietro needs her help. She finds her power is now unreliable, operating on the same level as when she first joined the Brotherhood of Mutants. To compensate for her lower power level, she studies magic again, seeking help from Harkness and Doctor Strange when faced with magical threats. While practicing honing her talents, Wanda accidentally creates a window that seems to show an alternate timeline where she, Vision, and their children remain together. Happy to see that somewhere in the multiverse her children are real and happy, and glad her memories of them returned after only a short time, Wanda believes she can cope with her loss. When Vision returns to Avengers West to help against the villain Ultron, Wanda hopes they might resume their romance but is disheartened to see Vision still lacks emotion and regards himself as a different person than the one who married her. Later, Wanda is nominated as leader of the Avengers West team.

=== Force Works ===
The members of Avengers West are called to Avengers Mansion in NYC to discuss whether or not the team California-based team is a failed experiment, considering some of their defeats, the destruction of their headquarters, and the loss of different members. A vote results in Avengers West officially dissolving, its members now designated as reservists of the main Avengers team. Rather than accept this status, Iron Man quits, prompting the other former members of Avengers West to follow suit. In Ventura, California, Iron Man forms a new, more proactive team called Force Works and asks Wanda to be leader. The team suffers several setbacks, including the seeming death of Wonder Man during their first adventure.

During "The Crossing" crossover, Iron Man is corrupted by villains and turns against the Avengers. Working with the main Avengers team again, Wanda encounters Vision, who has regained his original appearance as well as the capacity for emotions. When he implies he misses her, she quickly tells him their relationship is in the past. Wanda is unaware that not only has Vision regained his ability to feel but he also once again has all his emotional ties to the memories of his life before he was dismantled. Seeing how guarded she is and wishing to spare her more pain, Vision does not reveal this. At the end of "The Crossing", Iron Man seemingly dies, with Force Works disbanding soon afterward. The Scarlet Witch and Hawkeye return to the main Avengers team, once again becoming teammates with Quicksilver and Vision. To make amends for his behavior in the past, Quicksilver attempts to help Wanda reconcile with Vision so they can be friends again, knowing she feels nervous and awkward around him now.

Wanda is with the Avengers and the Fantastic Four when the two teams fight Onslaught. During their final battle, Vision is seriously injured and asks for Wanda, asking her to hold him. She does so and soon both join the Fantastic Four and Avengers in a plan to destroy Onslaught by sacrificing themselves. Due to the intervention of Franklin Richards, the Scarlet Witch and her teammates are not killed but transported to an alternate version of Earth where they live out new versions of their lives. In this reality, Wanda is a sorceress with no mutant abilities. Later on, the heroes are returned to the mainstream Marvel Earth, only months after they vanished and were believed dead. As a result of Franklin Richards subconsciously wishing to "fix" and restore the heroes he sent to the "Heroes Reborn" Earth, Iron Man is resurrected.

=== Chaos magic ===
Now back home, the Avengers discuss reforming but are attacked by Morgan le Fay, who kidnaps Wanda. She uses the Scarlet Witch as a conduit for magical forces, enhancing her probability powers to such a degree that she is able to warp reality according to Morgan's wishes. During this adventure, Wanda resurrects Wonder Man as an energy being by summoning his ionic energies back into a humanoid form. After the encounter with Morgan, the Scarlet Witch has an increase in power and realizes she can access magic used by others. Following the battle with Morgan, Wanda repeatedly checks on Vision, who takes weeks to recuperate from injuries he suffered. Vision, afraid to hurt Wanda again if they attempted to have a relationship again, insists that while he may have a personality again, he is still a different person than the one she married. Conflicted about her feelings for Vision and his seemingly cold and harsh attitude toward her, Wanda inadvertently summons Wonder Man again, who comforts her. Later on, she restores Wonder Man to physical form.

Wanda seeks help from Agatha Harkness about her increased power. Harkness explains Wanda's mutant genes allow her to directly access magical energies, explaining her ability to learn powerful sorcery so quickly. By channeling chaos magic, the same magic Chthon imbued her with soon after her birth, the Scarlet Witch becomes a powerful sorceress despite her lack of training. While she cannot bend reality to her will and is not a Sorcerer Supreme, it is later said that even those who have the Phoenix Force now have cause to fear her. Harkness points out that Wanda's own self-doubt and worry about living up to what she perceives as the expectations of others has held her back from realizing the full potential of this power and accessing real chaos magic before. After these talks and a battle against the Grim Reaper, Wanda becomes a more formidable superhero, now considered one of the most powerful Avengers alongside heroes such as Thor and Carol Danvers. Following another battle, the temporary absence of Iron Man and Captain America leads the team to decide Wanda is the natural choice to assume the duties of Avengers deputy leader and she accepts.

Wanda realizes she has been in denial of growing feelings for Wonder Man for some time and the two begin a relationship. Later on, Wanda realizes Vision lied about still thinking of himself as a new person and has regained the full emotional connections to his memories before he was dismantled, including their relationship. Sympathetic that Vision misses her, Wanda remains firm about leaving their relationship in the past and continuing her romance with Simon, adding that a reunion may have been possible earlier if her former husband had not chosen to lie and close himself off. Later, she has a copy of her own brain patterns made and gifts it to Vision, suggesting that one day if he wishes he can create a friend or love interest who is similar to her and understands him but is not an exact copy of her, just as he and Wonder Man are similar but not exact copies of each other. Months later, Wonder Man breaks up with Wanda. Weeks afterward, Wanda and Vision discuss possibly resuming their relationship.

=== Reality-warping era ===
Through circumstances not explained, Wanda once again loses the memories of her children's existence, as well as the memories of the years spent learning to coping with the loss afterward. When she hears the Wasp reference the twins, Wanda's memories return, causing her to relive the trauma. It is later revealed in Avengers: The Children's Crusade that at this point, feeling betrayed that her teammates allowed her mind to be tampered with, the Scarlet Witch seeks out help from the sorcerer and scientist Doctor Doom, hoping he can restore her children to life. To do so, they summon a mysterious and powerful cosmic force that merges with her and increases her power a hundredfold, leaving her emotionally broken, similar to what happened with Chthon, That Which Endures, and Immortus before. Wanda becomes enraged at the Avengers for allowing her children to die and letting Agatha Harkness tamper with her memories, leading to the events of Avengers Disassembled.

After killing Harkness, Scarlet Witch secretly launches a campaign of terror against the Avengers, influencing minds and creating simulated enemies to attack them. As a result, the Vision is destroyed by a maddened She-Hulk, Hawkeye is killed while fighting a simulated Kree soldier, and Scott Lang is apparently killed in an explosion (it was later revealed that he survived, saved by Wanda's future self who teleport him to the future). With help from Earth's heroes, Doctor Strange defeats Wanda and she falls into a coma. Magneto arrives and then leaves with her. At this time, the general public learns of Wanda's actions.

Realizing the Avengers and the X-Men are seriously contemplating killing his sister due to her increased power and mental instability, Quicksilver convinces Scarlet Witch to use her powers to create a world where everyone has their heart's desire fulfilled, and where the two of them and Magneto rule over a world where mutants are not persecuted. Although this House of M reality warp initially succeeds, several heroes (Hawkeye, Wolverine, and Layla Miller) regain their memories and join forces with others to restore reality. When Magneto discovers he is in a false reality and that Quicksilver is responsible, he murders the speedster. Wanda immediately resurrects her brother. Enraged she was not allowed to create a world where mutants were not persecuted by normal humans, Wanda removes the powers of most mutants on Earth. Wanda then takes refuge in Transia, blocking her memory of her true identity. Doom finds her and takes her to Latveria, leaving behind a robotic imposter.

=== Return to the Avengers ===
==== The Children's Crusade ====
Wiccan (Billy Kaplan) and his team, the Young Avengers, meet a teenage superhuman Speed. Speed, whose name is Tommy, looks like he could be Wiccan's twin, except that his hair is silver. Although he and Speed were born to different families years before the Scarlet Witch's marriage to Vision, Wiccan concludes they may be reincarnations of Wanda's lost children Thomas and William. The Young Avengers, Magneto, Quicksilver, and the Avengers all try to locate Wanda, eventually finding her amnesiac in Latveria and engaged to Doctor Doom. The gathered heroes learn the truth: after being accidentally reminded of her children's existence, Wanda had initially only wanted to find a way to resurrect Tommy and William and sought out Doom's help. Seeking to use Wanda as a weapon, Doom led her to the Life Force, a powerful mystical energy source. According to Doom, Wanda cannot affect time and space on her own but is still inherently a nexus of magic, able to act as a conduit for different mystical forces and use their power to increase her own. Wanda's attempts to tap into the Life Force increased her power a hundredfold, once again allowing her to alter reality as she had as a nexus being, but also causing her to enter a maddened state and then cause the events of Avengers Disassembled. Following the events of House of M, Doom found Wanda and manipulated her again, convincing her to be his bride.

Wanda regains her memories of her life and of her recent experiences during Avengers Assembled and House of M. Overwhelmed by the guilt of having attacked her own friends and family, Wanda attempts suicide but is interrupted and consoled by Wiccan. Wanda then seeks Doom's help in undoing the spell that erased many mutant powers after House of M. Instead, Doom steals the reality-warping Life Force power for himself. Wanda and Wiccan steal back the power, defeating him. Her power now restored to the level she had before Avengers Disassembled, Wanda exiles herself to solitude for a while, knowing many still hate her, particularly mutants, and believing she cannot blame it entirely on outside forces.

==== Avengers vs. X-Men ====
During the events of the Avengers vs. X-Men storyline, Ms. Marvel and Spider-Woman offer Wanda an official return to the Avengers team. Although she is initially reluctant, she follows them to Avengers Mansion. Vision, now rebuilt and online again, angrily blames Wanda for manipulating and killing him during Avengers Disassembled. Despite some protest, most of the Avengers defer to the Vision as a tearful Wanda leaves. Though Vision feels sympathy, he stands firm that Wanda has not regained trust yet.

When the Avengers go to retrieve Hope Summers and are nearly defeated by a corrupt, Phoenix Force-empowered Cyclops, Scarlet Witch arrives and saves them. Hope then leaves with Scarlet Witch. After further battles involving the Avengers and X-Men, Hope inherits the Phoenix Force. She and Wanda then combine their powers to apparently drive away the Phoenix from Earth by saying "No more Phoenix." This results in mutants across Earth regaining their powers, undoing some of the damage Wanda caused on M-Day. Despite this, many mutants maintain a hatred and fear of Wanda for causing the event in the first place.

=== Uncanny Avengers ===
Deciding the Avengers need to make more effort to show public cooperation between mutants and non-mutant superhumans, Captain America authorizes a new Avengers Unity Squad, composed of Avengers and X-Men. He asks Wanda to join the team, giving her a chance to atone for the recent past and show others that redemption is possible. Soon after Wanda joins, teammate Rogue is manipulated by the villainous Apocalypse Twins and kills Wanda. This death is undone when the Unity Squad is projected back in time.

=== AXIS ===
After stealing Charles Xavier's mutant telepathy, the Nazi villain Red Skull mounts a new attack. Wanda works with Doctor Strange to cast a moral inversion spell, hoping to draw out Xavier's essence in the Red Skull and put him in control of the body. This spell backfires when Doctor Doom takes Strange's place, resulting in the moral inversion of all heroes and villains in the vicinity, including Wanda. When Quicksilver and Magneto try to reason with the now-villainous Wanda, she attacks them with a magic curse designed to punish her own bloodline. When only Quicksilver is affected, Wanda realizes Magneto is not their father. Before she can pursue this further, Doom appears with the resurrected Jericho Drumm (Brother Voodoo) and the spirit of the hero's dead brother Daniel Drumm. Daniel possesses Wanda, allowing her and Doom to undo the spell and restore the heroes' and villains' moralities to normal.

With the Avengers Unity Squad, the Scarlet Witch and Quicksilver later take a trip to Counter-Earth. After being tracked down and defeated by Luminous (a superhuman woman created from the genetic material of Scarlet Witch and Quicksilver), Wanda and Pietro are brought to the High Evolutionary. He claims Django and Marya Maximoff were their true parents, implying the twins actually are the lost Ana and Mateo. He also reveals that not only are Magneto and Magda not their parents, but they are not mutants and have no X-gene. He explains their superhuman traits are the result of him experimenting on them as children, then abandoning them to the Maximoffs when he was unsatisfied with the results. After the High Evolutionary is defeated, Scarlet Witch and Quicksilver return to Earth with the Avengers Unity Division. Seeing she is upset over recent events and revelations, Vision reaches out to Wanda with compassion rather than judgment, the beginning of a new friendship.

=== All-New, All-Different Marvel: Scarlet Witch (2016–2017) ===
Leaving the Avengers so she can reassert her sense of self, Wanda becomes a troubleshooter specializing in magical threats, aided by the ghost of Agatha Harkness. Harkness confirms she has known all along Wanda was not a mutant or the child of Magneto, but chose not to say anything lest she influence the Scarlet Witch down the wrong path and disrupt her fate. During her adventures, Wanda quickly concludes some force or hidden enemy is disrupting magic all over Earth. During her initial adventures, she fights Declan Dane, the Emerald Warlock, who decides he will now be Wanda's arch-enemy.

While exploring the Witch's Road, a dimensional path existing outside normal space and time, Wanda meets Natalya Maximoff, another woman who calls herself the Scarlet Witch and a friend of Harkness. Wanda realizes this is her mother's spirit, and that Natalya is visiting the Witch's Road in the past, at a point in time before she is pregnant. After helping each other, Natalya realizes who Wanda must be just as she returns to her time period.

When the 2016 storyline "Civil War II" begins, Pietro asks Wanda for help but she refuses. She also says she resents Pietro still trying to tell her what to do as though she were a lost child, bluntly telling him that she has grown whereas his refusal to learn from his past mistakes marks him as a sociopath in her eyes. She invites Pietro to join her quest to learn more about Natalya Maximoff but he refuses.

Wanda's search for answers leads her to Serbia and the priest who gave up her and Pietro to the High Evolutionary. Finding her aunt and adopted mother Marya still alive, Wanda finally learns the truth about her mother and her biological relationship to Django and Marya. Wanda finally discovers a demonic manifestation of chaos is responsible for disrupting and attempting to destroy witchcraft. Wanda joins forces with the spirits of Natalya and Agatha, and together the three witches weaken the chaos entity long enough for Quicksilver (whom Natalya summons) to destroy it. Wanda and Pietro reconcile. To save magic, Natalya sacrifices her spirit, knowing this means she will no longer be able to communicate with Wanda or even maintain her own identity as a ghost. Before she vanishes, Natalya reveals it was not the High Evolutionary who killed her when she attempted to rescue her children. She was killed by Wanda and Pietro's father. But she vanishes before she can reveal the identity of this man. After seeing her mother's sacrifice, and now having a stronger sense of her past and identity, Wanda re-dedicates herself to being a superhero and an Avenger.

=== "Secret Empire" ===
In the 2017 storyline "Secret Empire", an alternate version of Captain America is created, one loyal to the terrorist organization Hydra. Taking the place of the real Steve Rogers, this "Hydra Cap" eventually attempts to take control over the United States. Wanda initially joins the fight to stop Hydra, but the gathered heroes fail. Afterward, Wanda is brainwashed into serving Hydra's version of the Avengers. Later, it is revealed Chthon has taken advantage of the situation to once again possess the Scarlet Witch, causing mental instability. During a later battle, Doctor Strange works to free Wanda from Chthon's control again. The true Captain America later returns and the events of the "Secret Empire" storyline are undone.

=== "Dawn of X" ===
During Marvel's 2019 "Dawn of X" relaunch of the X-Men books, Magneto, Charles Xavier, and many of their mutant allies and enemies decide to create a sovereign nation state for mutants on the living island Krakoa. In this new mutant nation, Wanda is considered an enemy of the state of Krakoa for the events of M-Day, ranked as second on the list of most dangerous enemies to mutantkind, since the removal of the X-gene resulted in 986,420 deaths. Magneto's former follower Exodus calls Wanda "the Great Pretender" in connection to the revelation that she is neither Magneto's daughter or a mutant.

=== Strange Academy ===
In the series Strange Academy, Wanda is a teacher at the titular school, which has been founded by Doctor Strange to train young people from many worlds with magical abilities in the use of sorcery and magical artifacts.

=== Hellfire Gala ===
Even though they are not related by blood, Magneto still believes there is a bond between himself and Wanda Maximoff and invites her to the first annual Hellfire Gala. Still ashamed of her actions against the mutant population via M-Day, Wanda declines and only agrees to see Magneto in private. After he promises to help alleviate the tension between herself and Krakoa, they share a dance. Soon afterwards, Wanda is seemingly found dead by her son Speed.

=== The Trial of Magneto ===
Due to evidence Wanda's attacker possessed magnetic abilities, Magneto is deemed a prime suspect. Following the attack, the Avengers invade Krakoa and a complicated confrontation ensues. Wanda is resurrected by Krakoa's "resurrection protocols", used to restore mutants by recreating their bodies and then implanting a "back-up" copy of their mind recorded by Cerebro. As her mind's last backup to Cerebro was recorded before the events of Avengers Disassembled, the resurrected Wanda clone has no memories of recent years. As others attempt to restore Wanda's mind, she is overwhelmed by the guilt of suddenly remembering the last few years and her actions, causing her to create physical constructs of monsters. Meanwhile, on the astral plane, the spirit of the murderer Wanda finds herself facing a vision of an older self who confronts her with uncomfortable truths she has denied. Realizing the need to heal by accepting her actions and forgiving herself, the three Wandas stop the monster attack and then merge, resulting in a fully restored Wanda who now knows there is at least one possible future where she will grow old and wise.

Unwilling to explain their resurrection program to outsiders, the mutants of Krakoa tell the Avengers that someone attempted to murder Wanda but she did not die from the attack. Evidence is found against Toad, who is found guilty and punished, and the Avengers leave. It is revealed Wanda was secretly worked with the mutants Polaris, Legion, and Proteus to increase the capabilities the resurrection protocols, which would require her to die. She recruited Magneto's help in arranging her own death, a suicide disguised by magic to look like a murder. Thanks to Wanda's plan, a pocket dimension "Waiting Room" is created which allows all mutants to be resurrected, including those who never had a chance to manifest their X-gene and those whose minds were not able to be copied to Cerebro. Learning this, the mutants of Krakoa who once referred to Wanda as a "Pretender" have forgiven her for the M-Day incident and Exodus gives her the new title of "The Redeemer". Wanda is now a welcome guest of Krakoa, telling her story to children so they may learn from her mistakes.

=== One World Under Doom and Sorcerer Supreme ===
In the ninth and final issue of the 2025 miniseries One World Under Doom, Wanda becomes the Sorcerer Supreme of Earth, which leads into her starring role in the subsequent Sorcerer Supreme series by writer Steve Orlando and artist Bernard Chang.

== Powers and abilities ==
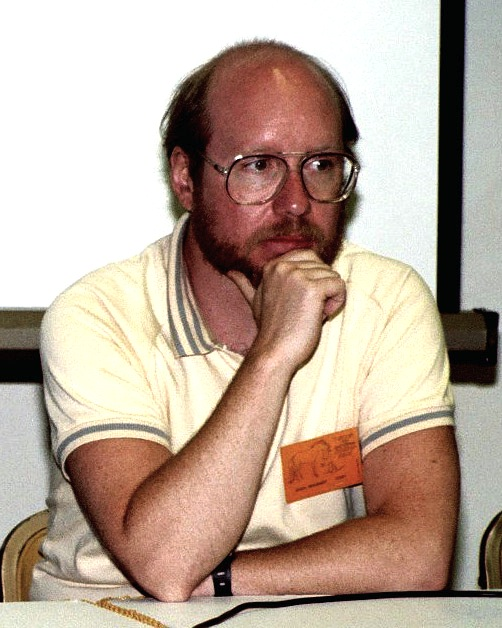
Writer Steve Englehart first associated the Scarlet Witch's powers with witchcraft.

When the Scarlet Witch was first created by Lee and Kirby, her main ability was a vaguely defined "hex power" that could cause random and unlikely things to affect her enemies or other targets, often in the form of "bad luck." These effects could be unpredictable, however, and thus not always helpful to Wanda. The vague and unpredictable nature of her power meant Wanda could use her ability in a variety of ways that helped the plot but also meant she couldn't easily solve all her problems.

Despite the character's name, the Scarlet Witch's powers stemmed not from witchcraft or magic but from being a mutant who could affect probability. Later stories gave her increased control, allowing her to release targeted "hex-bolts" that could cause enemy weapons to backfire, their abilities to fail, or the area around them to suffer sudden damage and instability. Eventually, she also became adept at casting energy blasts that could directly stun opponents. She later realizes her hex-bolts are the most basic use of chaos magic.

Writer Steve Englehart decided the character could become more powerful and formidable by living up to her name. His stories revealed Wanda had a strong talent for magic, possibly caused by the demon Chthon giving her latent magical talent as a child. Under Englehart, Wanda studies spell casting and the manipulation of magical forces under the tutelage of Agatha Harkness. Along with increasing her control over the effects of her hexes, this allows her to counter, deflect, and block a variety of magical attacks.

Writer Kurt Busiek redefined Scarlet Witch's powers, explaining that like Magneto, her mutant ability allowed her to tap into and manipulate a specific form of energy. Busiek suggested Wanda may have originally developed the power to access energy related to the electromagnetic spectrum if she had been left alone, but Chthon's interference soon after her birth influenced her genetics to tap into magical energy. Busiek depicted the sorceress Morgan le Fey remarking that while Wanda cannot fully warp time and space on her own (not since giving up her nexus being status), her ability to alter probability coupled with her magical talent meant others could use her as a conduit for multiple, powerful energies at once, and thus she could become a tool used to warp reality. Following her encounter with Morgan, Wanda learns that her hex abilities are an expression of chaos magic, the same magic Chthon used. By trusting in herself more, Wanda learns how to directly tap into chaos magic to increase her power and achieve a variety of effects, making her one of Earth's most powerful magic users. She also realized she could manipulate other forms of energy (though this required greater focus and strength). During Busiek's run, as well as the subsequent run by Geoff Johns, she was shown to be capable of large-scale spells given enough concentration and time to shape them to a specific goal, including the creation of a hurricane. Wanda's new chaos magic allows her to collect Wonder Man's near-immortal ionic energies and reconstitute them, allowing him temporary existence as an energy being and then eventually bringing him back to life as a physical being (although Wanda has been unable to resurrect normal human beings who are not energy-based life forms). The series Avengers vs X-Men confirmed that Wanda now largely relies on chaos magic.

A 2015 Uncanny Avengers story revealed Wanda was never a mutant, despite the assumption of others and what certain scientific tests indicated. Her and Quicksilver's superhuman traits, the genes that allowed her to directly access magical energy sources, were the result of the High Evolutionary experimenting on them as infants. This is in line with Busiek's explanation for her powers, with only the classification of "mutant" being changed.

In the 2016–2017 Scarlet Witch series, it is confirmed Wanda was always born with the ability to utilize witchcraft, a trait she inherited from other members of her family. The High Evolutionary's genetic tampering gave greater and direct access to magical energies, making her more powerful than she may have been otherwise, but was not solely responsible for her magical abilities.

=== Reality warping ===
Due to her unique genetics, Wanda is a nexus of magical energy, able to instinctively tap into different mystical power sources more easily than even highly trained sorcerers. Because of this, Wanda has gained the power to alter reality on multiple occasions.

When she was temporarily linked to magical energies around the town of New Salem, a magic-user community, Wanda seemingly used that energy to make herself pregnant. Later on, during John Byrne's Avengers West Coast stories, Wanda was said to be able to create lifelike illusions if her desire to do so was great enough. She later becomes powerful enough to hold multiple Avengers paralyzed through force of will. Writers Roy and Dann Thomas revealed this power increase and the ability to cast illusions were all due to Wanda's status as a nexus being, someone who has great influence over the reality around her and acts as an anchor point between timelines. The villain Immortus manipulated Wanda, causing a change of personality and drawing out her nexus energies in order to increase her overall power. Rather than be used as a tool by Immortus, Wanda completely released her nexus energies, giving up her ability to influence reality more than others. This restored her mind and the memories of her lost children, but also resulted in a temporary loss of her hex power. They returned weeks later, though weaker and unreliable. Wanda needed time and training to regain her previous power levels.

When the sorceress Morgan le Fey used Wanda as a conduit for different magical energy sources, this amplified Wanda's abilities. Morgan le Fey then used her to warp time and space, altering Earth to a more medieval setting and convincing the Avengers to act as her loyal servants and soldiers. When the adventure was over, Wanda's ability to warp time and minds vanished, but she now had a stronger ability to access magical energies on her own.

Writer Brian Michael Bendis retconned Wanda's abilities in the 2004 storyline "Avengers Disassembled". The story stated that chaos magic did not exist (in contradiction to previous Marvel stories with Doctor Strange) and was not an energy source used to achieve greater power. Bendis wrote that Wanda's true mutant power was to warp reality itself, as well as influence minds. In the "House of M" storyline, this new power was enough to change history through force of will, creating a new timeline. The later miniseries Avengers: The Children's Crusade restored Wanda's power to what it was before "Avengers Disassembled", again defining her as someone whose genes allow her to directly tap into magical fields, including chaos magic. Her actions during the "Avengers Disassembled'" and "House of M" storylines were explained as a temporary power increase due to a magical entity that bonded with her, similar to her earlier possessions by Chthon and Immortus and her time as a tool of Morgan le Fey.

== Cultural impact and legacy ==
=== Critical response ===
Various critics have assessed Scarlet Witch as among the most powerful and important characters in Marvel Comics. Mason Downey of GameSpot stated that the character explores humanity's fear of uncontrollable forces and the balance between power and responsibility. Downey appreciated the depth of her abilities, noting the immense stakes tied to her power, which allows her to reshape reality with devastating consequences.

Donald D. Markstein of Don Markstein's Toonopedia asserted, "The Scarlet Witch is unique among superheroes, and not just because she's the only one who wears a wimple. Her super power is unlike any other — she can alter probability so as to cause mishaps for her foes. In other words, she "hexes" them. At first her hexes were rather haphazard, but with years of practice, they've become both stronger and better controlled."

Darren Franich of Entertainment Weekly described Scarlet Witch as "the weird beating heart of the Avengers," highlighting her multifaceted role in Marvel's universe as a hero and antagonist dealing with psychological trauma. Sara Century of Syfy reflected on Scarlet Witch's narrative, stating that she has been in a "state of constant flux" since Avengers Disassembled and House of M. Century praised Scarlet Witch's storyline in the Krakoan Age, where she struggled to make up for the events of House of M.

IGN described Scarlet Witch as one of the "greatest Avengers of all time," emphasizing her duality as a character. They stated that she is "by far the most controversial character on [the] list," noting that while she has performed numerous heroic deeds that rival the team's finest members, she has also caused significant damage, sometimes comparable to the actions of its most dangerous villains. IGN praised her initial decision to join the Avengers alongside her brother Quicksilver as a pivotal moment, as the duo sought to distance themselves from their "mutant terrorist father Magneto". The outlet found that Scarlet Witch and Quicksilver consistently proved themselves to be "great heroes and dependable members" of the Avengers.

Chris Vazquez of The Washington Post noted Scarlet Witch's struggle with isolation, as depicted in both comics and films, where she often receives little support from others. He pointed out that in the "House of M" storyline, characters even contemplate killing her during a mental health crisis. Brandon Bush, a comic book journalist, discussed how this lack of support for Scarlet Witch mirrors systemic injustices, with marginalized communities facing similar neglect and a lack of resources.

==== Feminist interpretation ====
Scarlet Witch was not conceived with ideas of female empowerment in mind. At her debut in the 1960s, the readership for superhero comics was assumed to be mostly male, and the Scarlet Witch was originally seen by some fans and Marvel creators as a token female character with a passive power, used mainly for interpersonal relation plots, perhaps to draw female readers who were believed to prefer romance comics. Over time, the Scarlet Witch developed into a feminist symbol, beginning with her battle with the Lady Liberators. Steve Englehart, who enjoyed the marriage of Wanda and Vision and created their children Thomas and William, lamented that later stories annulled the marriage, killed off their children, and repeatedly put Wanda in positions where she became temporarily evil due to emotional trauma and the manipulations of others.

=== Romani heritage ===
Scarlet Witch, alongside her twin brother Quicksilver, was long established as being of Romani heritage. Over time, however, retcons called her parentage into question, which drew criticism for how the character’s ethnic roots were handled. When the characters debuted in the MCU, Romani commentators and cultural critics argued that Scarlet Witch’s Romani heritage had been quietly set aside. Many described this as whitewashing and a missed opportunity to provide representation of a community that is rarely represented in mainstream media.

== In other media ==
=== Television ===
Scarlet Witch has appeared in numerous animated series, beginning with the "Captain America segment" of The Marvel Super Heroes (1966), voiced by Peg Dixon. She later appeared in Iron Man (1994–1996), voiced by Katherine Moffat in season one and Jennifer Darling in season two. She appeared alongside Quicksilver in the X-Men: The Animated Series episode "Family Ties" (1996), voiced by Catherine Disher, and The Avengers: United They Stand (1999–2000), voiced by Stavroula Logothettis. The character appeared in the second and third seasons of X-Men: Evolution (2000–2003), voiced by Venus Terzo, in Wolverine and the X-Men (2009), voiced by Laura Harris, and in The Super Hero Squad Show (2009–2011), voiced by Grey DeLisle.

=== Films ===
In 1993, Marvel licensed the film rights to the X-Men and related concepts, including mutants, to 20th Century Fox, which went on to produce a film series from 2000 to 2024. In 2008, Marvel began its own film franchise, the Marvel Cinematic Universe (MCU), focusing on characters whose rights were not licensed to other studios. At the time, the rights to Quicksilver and Scarlet Witch were disputed, with Fox citing their mutant status and connection to Magneto, while Marvel cited the twins’ editorial history, which tied them more closely to the Avengers than the X-Men, the studios made an agreement wherein both of them could use the characters on the condition that the plots did not make reference to the other studio's properties.

The arrangement became moot after Disney, the parent company of Marvel Studios, acquired 21st Century Fox and confirmed that future X-Men films would take place within the MCU. In the Fox Studio film X-Men: Days of Future Past (2014), Peter Maximoff's mother and younger sister mention a third, unseen sibling. According to director Bryan Singer, this character was meant to suggest the existence of an older sister for comic book fans, but she was never explicitly identified as the Scarlet Witch.

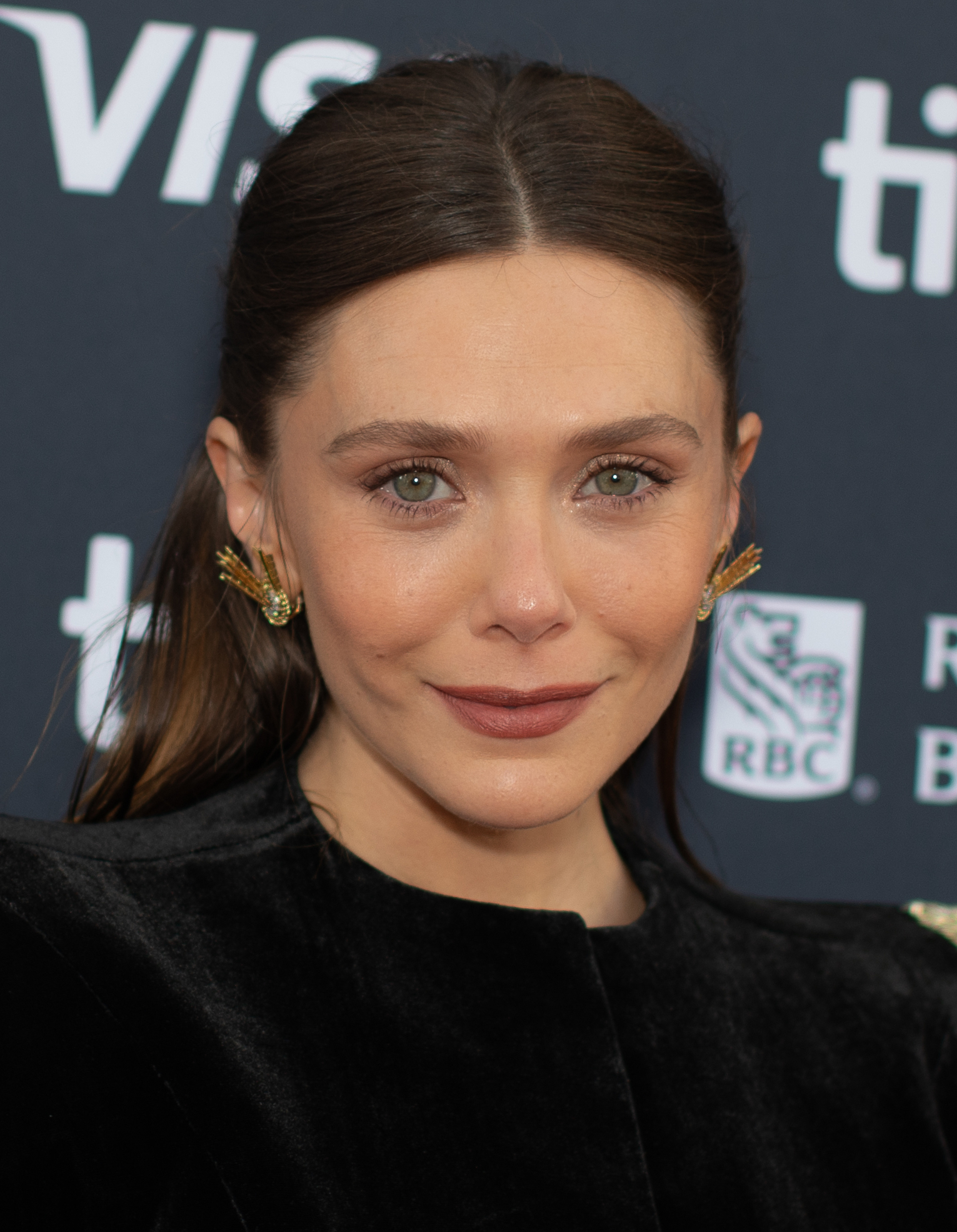
Elizabeth Olsen (pictured in 2024) portrays Scarlet Witch in the Marvel Cinematic Universe.

Ultimately, Marvel created a film adaptation of the character, which appears in media set in the Marvel Cinematic Universe, portrayed by Elizabeth Olsen. Olsen first appears in the mid-credits scene of the live-action film Captain America: The Winter Soldier (2014), before making subsequent appearances in the films Avengers: Age of Ultron (2015), Captain America: Civil War (2016), Avengers: Infinity War (2018), Avengers: Endgame (2019), and Doctor Strange in the Multiverse of Madness (2022) as well as the Disney+ miniseries WandaVision (2021) and VisionQuest (2026). Alternate-timeline versions of Wanda appear in season two (2023) of the Disney+ animated television series What If…?, which ran from 2021 to 2024, as well as in its spin-off Marvel Zombies (2025), both voiced by Olsen.

=== Video games ===
Scarlet Witch appears as a playable character in X-Men Legends II: Rise of Apocalypse (2005), voiced by Jennifer Hale. She also appears as a playable character in Marvel Super Hero Squad: The Infinity Gauntlet (2010) and Marvel Super Hero Squad: Comic Combat (2011), voiced by Tara Strong. The character appears in Marvel Super Hero Squad Online (2011), and makes a cameo appearance in Doctor Strange's ending in Ultimate Marvel vs. Capcom 3 (2011).

In the 2010s, Scarlet Witch appeared as a playable character in Marvel: Avengers Alliance (2012), Marvel Avengers: Battle for Earth (2012), voiced by Laura Bailey, and Marvel Heroes (2013), voiced by Kate Higgins. Higgins voiced the character again in Ultimate Alliance 3: The Black Order (2019) and in Marvel Rivals (2024). Other appearances include Marvel Avengers Academy (2016), voiced by Tamara Fritz, Lego Marvel's Avengers (2016), voiced by Olsen, Marvel's Midnight Suns (2022) voiced by Emily O'Brien.

Scarlet Witch also appears as a statue in Thanos's stage in Marvel Super Heroes (1995). She appears as an NPC in Spider-Man: Battle for New York (2006). Other non-voiced appearances include Marvel Puzzle Quest (2021), Marvel Contest of Champions (2014), Marvel: Future Fight (2015), Marvel Super War (2020), Marvel Future Revolution (2022), and Marvel Snap (2022).

=== Miscellaneous ===
Scarlet Witch appears in a "Got Milk?" commercial as a member of the Avengers. The MCU incarnation of the Scarlet Witch appears as a meet and greet character at Disney California Adventure. An alternate timeline variant of Wanda Maximoff appears in the novel What If... Wanda Maximoff and Peter Parker Were Siblings?.

== Bibliography ==
- Eury, Michael (2017). Hero-A-Go-Go: Campy Comic Books, Crimefighters, & Culture of the Swinging Sixties. United States: TwoMorrows Publishing. ISBN 978-1-60549-073-1.
- W. Wright, Bradford (2001). Comic Book Nation: The Transformation of Youth Culture in America. United States: The Johns Hopkins University Press. ISBN 0-8018-6514-X.
- Zimmerman, David (2004). Comic Book Character: Unleashing the Hero in Us All. United States: Inter Varsity Press. ISBN 0-8308-3260-2.
