= Uncanny Avengers =

Comic book series

- Cover of Uncanny Avengers #1 (December 2012). Art by John Cassaday & Laura Martin

Publication information
- Publisher: Marvel Comics
- Schedule: Monthly
- Format: (vol. 1. 3): Limited series (vol. 2. 4): Ongoing series
- Publication date: List: (vol. 1) December 2012 – December 2014 (vol. 2) March 2015 – August 2015 (vol. 3) December 2015 – February 2018 (vol. 4) October 2023 – February 2024
- No. of issues: List: (vol. 1): 26 (one Annual) (vol. 2): 5 (vol. 3): 30 (one Annual) (vol. 4): 5
- Main character: List: Current members: Doctor Voodoo Human Torch Quicksilver Rogue (field leader) Scarlet Witch Synapse Wasp Cable Captain America (Sam Wilson) Captain America (Steve Rogers) Deadpool Havok Sabretooth Spider-Man Sunfire Thor Wolverine Wonder Man Vision

Creative team as of October 2023
- Created by: Rick Remender; John Cassaday
- Written by: List: (vol. 1) Rick Remender (vol. 2) Gerry Duggan Rick Remender (vol. 3) Gerry Duggan Jim Zub (vol. 4) Gerry Duggan
- Penciller: List: (vol. 1) John Cassaday Daniel Acuña Steve McNiven (vol. 2) Daniel Acuña Ryan Stegman (vol. 3) Ryan Stegman Pepe Larraz Sean Izaakse (vol. 4) Joshua Cassara Javier Garron Emilio Laiso
- Inker: List: (vol. 1) John Dell (vol. 2) Daniel Acuna Ryan Stegman (vol. 3) Mark Morales (vol. 4) Joshua Cassara Javier Garron Emilio Laiso
- Colorist: List: (vol. 1) Laura Martin (vol. 2) Daniel Acuna Richard Isanove (vol. 3) Richard Isanove David Curiel Tamra Bonvillain (vol. 4) Marte Gracia Morry Hollowell

Uncanny Avengers is an American comic book series first appearing in the October 2012 debut of Marvel NOW!, published by Marvel Comics. The series follows an interconnected fictional superhero team, featuring members from the Marvel Universe (specifically the Avengers and X-Men). The team is united by Captain America upon the conclusion of Avengers vs. X-Men. Uncanny Avengers is also known as Avengers Unity Squad.

== Publication history ==
Marvel Comics announced Uncanny Avengers by the creative team of Rick Remender and John Cassaday in August 2012. Uncanny Avengers follows a new team of Avengers formed in response to the events of Avengers vs. X-Men. The team features a line-up of both classic Avengers and X-Men including Captain America (Steve Rogers), Havok, Rogue, the Scarlet Witch, Thor, and Wolverine.

Rick Remender said, "There's something that Cyclops said to [Captain America] on Utopia that's ringing in his head. He didn't do enough to help. And Steve (Captain America) is taking that to heart. Coming out of AvX with the landscape shifted and changed as much as it is, there are events that lead Steve to recognizing that he needs to do more".

In October 2014, the second volume of Uncanny Avengers was announced to start in January 2015 with art by Daniel Acuña and written by Rick Remender. This volume ended due to cancellation after Issue #5 in May 2015. The roster for the second volume included Captain America (Sam Wilson), Scarlet Witch, Rogue, Quicksilver, Vision, Sabretooth, and Doctor Voodoo.

The third volume began in October 2015, and was written by Gerry Duggan with art by Ryan Stegman. It ended with Issue 30, which was released in December 2017.

A new iteration of the series was announced in 2023 and debuted on August 16, 2023. The roster features former members Captain America (Steve Rogers), Quicksilver and Rogue alongside Psylocke, Penance, and Deadpool.

== Fictional team history ==
=== Volume 1 ===
==== The Red Shadow ====
Wolverine gives a eulogy at the funeral of Professor X at the Jean Grey School, while Havok visits Cyclops in prison to discuss Cyclops' actions as the Phoenix. Afterward, Captain America and Thor meet with Havok, where Captain America offers him the chance to lead a new Avengers team. While paying her respects to Professor X at his grave, Scarlet Witch is confronted by Rogue about her role in everything that has happened to the X-Men and the mutant race. While arguing, they are attacked by Red Skull's S-Men, who defeat them both and steal Professor X's body. In his lair, the Red Skull is seen removing Professor X's brain for his own use.

While looking for survivors after Avalanche's attack, Wolverine questions Captain America's choice of having Havok lead the team and Thor vows to resolve the mutant conflict. Rogue escapes after being captured by the S-Men and Scarlet Witch is tempted by Red Skull to repeat the events of House of M. Rogue attacks the Scarlet Witch and they fight until they both discover the lobotomized body of Professor X. Red Skull arrives and reveals that he has assimilated Professor X's brain. Red Skull also reveals that he is a clone of the original Red Skull who was created in 1942 and held in cryogenic stasis in the event that Germany lost World War II.

Using Professor X's telepathy, Red Skull provokes ordinary citizens of New York into joining the S-Men in a mass assault against mutants. However, Red Skull is unable to completely control Captain America, and an attack against him disrupts his powers long enough for Rogue and Scarlet Witch to break free.

Scarlet Witch removes Thor from the battle, allowing Havok and Rogue to help Captain America overpower Red Skull. At Avengers Mansion, Captain America and Havok look at leads to find the S-Men and Havok expresses doubts over his own leadership.

The team makes their debut as the Avengers Unity Squad (which also contains Sunfire, Wasp, and Wonder Man as the team's latest recruits) during a press conference, which is crashed by a resurrected Grim Reaper. During the fight, Rogue absorbs some of Wonder Man's powers and seemingly kills Grim Reaper.

==== Apocalypse Twins ====
In 1013 AD at a Scandinavian inn, Thor is in a bar fight when he is attacked by Apocalypse, who acts to safeguard the future due to information given him by Pharaoh Rama-Tut. Thor finds that Apocalypse is wearing Celestial-built armor that can withstand the powers of a god. Thor returns to Asgard and demands an audience with his father Odin, but when Odin asks him to take the high road, Thor turns to Loki for help. Loki leads him to a hidden scroll in Odin's library which could bless a weapon to pierce Celestial armor, only for "Loki" to be revealed as Kang the Conqueror. Thor returns to London and kills the Horsemen of Apocalypse. He then breaks into Apocalypse's craft and manages to cut his armor open with his axe Jarnbjorn, but Apocalypse escapes. Odin warns that one day this act will cause great calamity. In the present day, Kang appears at the final resting place of Baron Mordo in Brazil, and takes Jarnbjorn.

Havok clears Rogue's name with S.H.I.E.L.D. for killing Grim Reaper and has her start an investigation into Magneto. While Wasp shows Havok her clothing line to promote mutants, a Celestial ship controlled by the Apocalypse Twins crashes into S.W.O.R.D.'s Peak base with Captain America and Sunfire aboard in response to the Twins killing a Celestial using Jarnbjorn. Thor and Sunfire travel throughout space to the Apocalypse Twins ship, and are teleported away upon entering. Meanwhile, the remaining members of the team, travel in the Quinbird, on a search for the twins. In South Sudan, Captain America exits his pod and is attacked by local soldiers. He travels to a demolished church for shelter and finds a message from Immortus.

The team eventually learns of Logan's murder of Daken and or Thor's impetuous behavior in creating the celestially powered Jarnbjorn. The team splits up, which is what the Twins wanted, just before introducing the new four horsemen of Apocalypse: Grim Reaper, Banshee, Daken, and Sentry. Banshee subdues Havok and kidnaps Scarlet Witch, Reaper kidnaps his brother, Wonder Man, and Sentry subdues Thor, while Daken imprisons Wolverine. The Twins convince Scarlet Witch that only she can save the mutant race from extinction, by creating a hex spell large enough to teleport them to their own universe, and allow Earth to be taken over by Red Skull/Onslaught.

==== Ragnarok Now ====
The divided Avengers Unity Squad reunite to stop the Apocalypse Twins. Scarlet Witch convinces Wonder Man to act as a power cell to cast a spell to bring all the mutants on Earth to an Ark, but she planned to double-cross the twins. Unbeknownst to Rogue, she decides the only way to stop Wanda is by eliminating her, so she steals Logan's claw power and stabs her. Grim Reaper then stabs Rogue in the back. Right before Wanda dies, Wonder Man sacrifices himself to channel Wanda's final spell, a treachery foreseen by Eimin, who entraps the entire mutant population. Exiter, the Celestial executioner, comes to destroy Earth. Stark and all Earth's heroes feebly try to stop the advance. Thor and Captain America divide the twins, but Rogers is killed by Reaper and Exiter destroys Earth. Thor returns to Asgard and Odin chastises him that it was Thor's fault for creating Jarnbjorn and mankind was doomed.

==== Avenge the Earth ====
The story starts in an alternate future where all the world's mutants are living on Planet X following the destruction of Earth by the Celestials. While most of the mutant population has accepted the new status quo—believing that the Scarlet Witch died willingly to save them, while the Avengers tried to stop the inevitable—the remaining free Avengers (Havok, Thor and Wasp, aided by Beast) must work with Kang and his Chrono-Corp to defeat Eimen. Having rescued Wolverine and Sunfire from being tortured on the Apocalypse Ark, the Avengers use Kang's technology to project their minds back into their past selves and stop the Celestials before they can strike.

The timeline is successfully altered by the Avengers, when Rogue, empowered by numerous heroes, and Sentry slow Exitar's descent long enough for Thor to kill Exitar. Kang retreats as Immortus appears with his Chrono-Corps, but Sunfire is converted to an energy-based form when his body is destroyed, Simon's essence is trapped within Rogue, Havok is left badly burned, and Havok and Wasp are left devastated by the apparent loss of their daughter (conceived in the future and taken by Kang to protect her from the change in the timeline).

==== Uncanny Avengers Annual ====
A one-issue story following the introduction of the Avengers of the Supernatural, including Doctor Strange, Ghost Rider, Man-Thing, Blade, Satana and Manphibian. The Avengers of the Supernatural are chosen by Mojo for his newest reality show. Under mind-control, they abduct the Avengers Unity Squad from the Avengers Mansion, and once in Mojoworld, both teams are made to take part in a reality show called "Martian Transylvania Super Hero Mutant Monster Hunter High School". In the show, the mutants of the Unity Squad are goth outcasts, the rest are football stars and cheerleaders, and the Avengers of the Supernatural are the geeks of the High School. As part of the show, the Scarlet Witch tells Johnny Blaze she is pregnant, but the Spirit of Vengeance believes it really has an offspring. As Blaze is possessed by the spirit, he goes "too far out of character", and Mojo's influence over the other heroes is broken. Ghost Rider then starts rampaging through Mojoworld looking for sinner souls to punish, until Mojo convinces the Avengers to save Mojoworld, as there were numerous innocent lives. Both Avengers teams fight Ghost Rider in order to distract him, and let Satana pry the Spirit of Vengeance from Blaze and temper it. Satana fails, but Rogue manages to sneak up on Ghost Rider and absorb his powers. She becomes the new Ghost Rider and tempers the Spirit of Vengeance, but as it begins taking control of her, Blaze reabsorbs the spirit into him, becoming the Ghost Rider once more. Having controlled the Spirit of Vengeance and saved Mojoworld, the Avengers of the Supernatural and the Unity Squad return to their universes.

==== AXIS ====
During the AXIS storyline, Red Skull's S-Men abduct Havok, Rogue, and Scarlet Witch. They manage to break free thanks to Rogue's new powers from Wonder Man and rescue Magneto. When the group is confronted by the S-Men, Magneto uses his abilities to kill the S-Men and then kill Red Skull which causes him to unleash the Red Onslaught. Magneto, Havok, Rogue, and Scarlet Witch confront Red Onslaught and are joined by the Avengers, the X-Men, and the allies of both teams. Red Onslaught then unleashes the Stark Sentinels on them. After Scarlet Witch and Doctor Doom cast an inversion spell, Red Onslaught is inverted alongside the personalities of those present. As everyone is deciding what to do with Red Skull, Havok quits the Avengers Unity Squad and rejoins the X-Men. Following the reinversion spell being cast, the Avengers Unity Squad is rebuilt with Doctor Voodoo as its latest member.

=== Volume 2 ===
==== Trip to Counter-Earth ====
The Avengers Unity Squad are joined by a reformed Sabretooth when they head to the High Evolutionary's Counter-Earth to look for Scarlet Witch and Quicksilver. The members of the Unity Squad are scattered across Counter-Earth. Captain America is trapped and assimilated by tree-like creatures; Vision finds himself in a technological city where he meets an android named Eve; Rogue is found and experimented on by the Master Scientist, who expunges Wonder Man from her; Doctor Voodoo appeared in a destroyed city inhabited by the souls of those killed in the High Evolutionary's search for genetic perfection, and Sabretooth appears in one of the Counter-Earth's main cities where he is quickly taken down by the New Men. Quicksilver and Scarlet Witch were abducted by the Low Evolutionary and brought to Lowtown, where the rejected experiments of the High Evolutionary resided. Quicksilver and Scarlet Witch agree to help the Low Evolutionary take down the High Evolutionary, when they are attacked by the High Evolutionary's creation Luminous, who sports the abilities of Quicksilver and Scarlet Witch.

Quicksilver and Scarlet Witch learn that they are not mutants and gained their abilities from the High Evolutionary's experiments. After escaping, the two find Rogue and defend Lowtown from the High Evolutionary. Vision saves Scarlet Witch from Luminous, while Doctor Voodoo heavily injures the High Evolutionary. Quicksilver delivers the final blow to the High Evolutionary, who flees with Luminous.

=== Volume 3 ===
==== Lost Future ====
Cover of Uncanny Avengers, vol. 3, #1 (December 2015). Art by Ryan Stegman & Richard Isanove

As part of the All-New, All-Different Marvel, the Avengers Unity Squad are now helping humankind, mutants, and Inhumans. Rogue remains on the team to represent the mutants while Human Torch and a new telepath named Synapse represent the Inhumans. While Quicksilver and Doctor Voodoo remained on the team, Scarlet Witch, Vision, and Sabretooth did not rejoin the group.

When Super-Adaptoid returns to Earth, it fought the Avengers Unity Squad. While it is able to copy Human Torch's powers on a whim like before, Deadpool touched it barehanded. Not only did Super-Adaptoid copy Deadpool's powers, it also copied Deadpool's cancer as it became overrun with the disease that killed the organic properties of Super-Adaptoid. Deadpool is scolded for his reckless abandon which led to Spider-Man quitting the Avengers Unity Squad.

During the Avengers: Standoff! storyline, the Avengers Unity Squad arrive in Connecticut after answering Commander Steve Rogers' call. They discover Wrecker trying to escape in an SUV with Maria Hill. The Avengers Unity Squad help Wrecker and Hill avoid the S.H.I.E.L.D. forces. While on their way to Pleasant Hill, the Avengers Unity Squad is attacked by another version of Hill, who is on a Quinjet with the Avengers.

==== The Man Who Fell to Earth ====
Hank Pym returns to Earth and joins the Unity Squad after talking to Steve. However, Steve doesn't trust him and calls in the Wasp for help. Pym is revealed to have been killed by Ultron, who assumed his appearance and memories. The Unity Squad attempt to stop Ultron with the help of the Vision. Ultron is defeated when Vision teleports him into space.

==== Civil War II ====
Faced with the tension of the escalating conflict in the superhuman community, along with Steve's own refusal to deal with the threat of the Terrigen cloud and the danger to mutant lives, Rogue contemplates disbanding the Unity Squad, but they are called back together when Doctor Voodoo reveals that his brother has allied with the Hand to steal Bruce Banner's corpse and resurrect the Hulk as their soldier. The Squad is unable to stop the Hand's ceremony, but after they contain the Hulk, Voodoo is able to enter the astral plane and release Banner of the Hand's influence.

As the war ends, the Red Skull mounts his attack, having used his telepathic powers to subtly take control of the heroes, but Deadpool is able to resist him long enough to place Magneto's old helmet on Rogue, allowing her to defeat the Skull. Beast subsequently performs an operation to remove the elements of Xavier's brain from the Skull without compromising the Skull's personality.

=== Volume 4 ===
Following Orchis's attack on Krakoa during the third Hellfire Gala, Captain America forms a new incarnation of the Uncanny Avengers, intending to avenge Orchis's victims.

== Other version ==
=== Age of Ultron ===
In an alternate reality seen in "Age of Ultron", the Earth is near the end due to Ultron nearly destroying the world. Wolverine tries to fix the world by using time travel to kill Hank Pym before he invented Ultron. By doing so, the world is altered. This issue features the Apocalypse Twins trying to kill Colonel America (an alternate version of Captain America) while under the orders of Kang the Conqueror. While Colonel America goes into the sewers to meet Havok, he is attacked by the twins. Colonel America manages to escape injured but is unable to prevent the deaths of the alternate versions of Havok and Rogue. After the twins fail their task, Kang plans to send the Twins back to the mutant camps for the next few years.

== Roster ==
Characters in Bold are current members.

Character	Real name	Joined in	Notes
**Captain America**	Steve Rogers	Uncanny Avengers #1 (October 2012)	Former leader of the main Avengers team. Disbanded the team in Uncanny Avengers vol. 3. #14.
Havok	Alexander Summers	Uncanny Avengers #1 (October 2012)	Former leader. Left the team in Avengers & X-Men: AXIS #3.
**Rogue**	Anna Marie	Uncanny Avengers #1 (October 2012)	Field leader.
Scarlet Witch	Wanda Maximoff	Uncanny Avengers #1 (October 2012)	
Wolverine	James Howlett	Uncanny Avengers #1 (October 2012)	
Thor	Thor Odinson	Uncanny Avengers #1 (October 2012)	Left the team after Uncanny Avengers #27.
Sunfire	Shiro Yoshida	Uncanny Avengers #5 (March 2013)	Left the team after Uncanny Avengers #27.
Wasp	Janet van Dyne	Uncanny Avengers #5 (March 2013)	
Wonder Man	Simon Williams	Uncanny Avengers #5 (March 2013)	Left the team after Uncanny Avengers vol. 2 #1.
Captain America	Sam Wilson	Avengers & X-Men: AXIS #2 (October 2014)	Left the team after Uncanny Avengers vol. 2 #5.
Doctor Voodoo	Jericho Drumm	Avengers & X-Men: AXIS #9 (December 2014)	
**Quicksilver**	Pietro Maximoff	Avengers & X-Men: AXIS #9 (December 2014)	
Sabretooth	Victor Creed	Uncanny Avengers vol. 2 #1 (January 2015)	Left the team after Uncanny Avengers vol. 2 #5.
Vision	Victor Shade (alias)	Uncanny Avengers vol. 2 #1 (January 2015)	Left the team after Uncanny Avengers vol. 2 #5.
Human Torch	Johnny Storm	Avengers #0 (October 2015)	
Synapse	Emily Guerrero	Avengers #0 (October 2015)	
Spider-Man	Peter Parker	Avengers #0 (October 2015)	Left the team in Uncanny Avengers vol. 3 #1.
**Deadpool**	Wade Wilson	Avengers #0 (October 2015)	Left the team after Uncanny Avengers vol. 3 #23.
Cable	Nathan Summers	Uncanny Avengers vol. 3 #4 (January 2016)	Left the team after Uncanny Avengers vol. 3 #23.
Beast	Hank McCoy	Uncanny Avengers vol. 3 #28 (October 2017)	
**Psylocke**	Kwannon	Uncanny Avengers vol. 4 #1 (August 2023)	
**Penance**	Monet St. Croix	Uncanny Avengers vol. 4 #1 (August 2023)	

== Reception ==
- Comic Book Resources gave Uncanny Avengers #1 a 4.5/5, declaring it to be a "grand opening to Marvel NOW!".
- IGN gave Uncanny Avengers #1 a 7.9 "Good" rating.

== Collected editions ==
Title	Material collected	Pages	Publication Date	ISBN
Volume 1
Uncanny Avengers Vol. 1: The Red Shadow	Uncanny Avengers (vol. 1) #1–5	136	May 7, 2013	978-0785168447
Uncanny Avengers Vol. 2: The Apocalypse Twins	Uncanny Avengers (vol. 1) #6–11, 8AU	160	November 12, 2013	978-0785168454
Uncanny Avengers Vol. 3: Ragnarok Now	Uncanny Avengers (vol. 1) #12–17	136	April 15, 2014	978-0785184836
Uncanny Avengers Vol. 4: Avenge the Earth	Uncanny Avengers (vol. 1) #18–22	136	September 30, 2014	978-0785154235
Uncanny Avengers Vol. 5: AXIS Prelude	Uncanny Avengers (vol. 1) #23–25, Annual #1, Magneto (vol. 3) #9–10	144	January 20, 2015	978-0785154259
Uncanny Avengers Omnibus	Uncanny Avengers (vol. 1) #1–25, 8AU, Annual #1	672	March 3, 2015	978-0785193944
Volume 2
Uncanny Avengers Vol. 1: Counter-Evolutionary	Uncanny Avengers (vol. 2) #1–5	112	September 8, 2015	978-0785192374
Volume 3
Uncanny Avengers Vol. 1: Lost Future	Uncanny Avengers (vol. 3) #1–6	152	May 3, 2016	978-0785196150
Uncanny Avengers Vol. 2: The Man Who Fell to Earth	Uncanny Avengers (vol. 3) #7-12	136	October 4, 2016	978-0785196167
Uncanny Avengers Vol. 3: Civil War II	Uncanny Avengers (vol. 3) #13-17	112	April 4, 2017	978-1302902346
Uncanny Avengers Vol. 4: Red Skull	Uncanny Avengers (vol. 3) #18-23	136	August 8, 2017	978-1302906443
Secret Empire: United We Stand	Uncanny Avengers (vol. 3) #24-25 and Secret Empire: United #1, Secret Empire: Underground #1, Secret Empire: Uprising #1,	112	October 24, 2017	978-1302908553
Uncanny Avengers Vol. 5: Stars and Garters	Uncanny Avengers (vol. 3) #26-30	112	March 13, 2018	978-1302906450
Volume 4
Uncanny Avengers: The Resistance Vol. 1	Uncanny Avengers (Vol. 4) 1–5, Free Comic Book Day 2023: Avengers/X-Men1	160	May 14, 2024	9781302952334
