= Agamotto =

Publication information
- Publisher: Marvel Comics
- First appearance: Marvel Premiere #5 (November 1972)
- Created by: Stan Lee (writer); Steve Ditko (artist)

In-story information
- Team affiliations: Vishanti
- Notable aliases: Agamotto the All-Seeing; The Light of Truth
- Abilities: Cross-dimensional awareness Near limitless mystical energy Primary power source for the Sorcerer Supreme.

Agamotto is a fictional character appearing in American comic books published by Marvel Comics. Created by writer Stan Lee and artist Steve Ditko, the character first appeared in Marvel Premiere #5, published in 1972. He is the source of the Eye of Agamotto, a tool of magical clairvoyance used by superhero sorcerer Doctor Strange.

== Publication history ==
In a preface to the Doctor Strange story in The Origin of Marvel Comics, co-creator Stan Lee explained that while many people assumed such names to be distorted allusions to real-world spiritual terminology, he "just made 'em up." In the Modern Greek language, Agamotto's name is transliterated using slightly different vowels to avoid resemblance to a vulgar phrase.

Agamotto appeared as part of the "Vishanti" entry in the Official Handbook of the Marvel Universe Update '89 #8.

== Fictional character biography ==
Agamotto is a non-corporeal entity who was born from Oshtur tens of millions of years ago. He can take on any form, but often appears as a lion, tiger, or a large caterpillar. Together with Oshtur and Hoggoth, Agamotto is one of the three Vishanti and one of the most powerful mystical entities in the Marvel Universe, giving mystical knowledge and power to sorcerers who invoke their names in spells. Agamotto was the first Sorcerer Supreme of Earth.

When Doctor Strange uses the Orb of Agamotto after being mortally wounded by Silver Dagger, he is drawn into Agamotto's realm. Agamotto does not reveal his true identity to Strange during this encounter, instead toying with Strange before revealing how to leave the realm. Following Agamotto's instructions, Strange returns to Earth and defeats Silver Dagger, who is imprisoned in Agamotto's realm.

Strange later returns to Agamotto's realm to escape imprisonment in Mephisto's dimension. This time, the Caterpillar revealed to Strange that he actually was Agamotto, but insisted that Strange remain there as his companion. Though Strange explained his need to leave to save the soul of his friend Sara Wolfe, Agamotto refused to let him leave. Strange's attempts to force his way past Agamotto were unsuccessful until he threatened to destroy Agamotto's "hookah pipe". Agamotto agreed to allow Strange to leave his dimension in exchange for the hookah. Moreover, Agamotto revealed he had secretly rescued Strange's mystic talismans - including the Book of the Vishanti, the Scrolls of Watoomb, and the Orb of Agamotto - that Strange had believed destroyed in his battle with the alien sorcerer Urthona.

When Doctor Strange and Daimon Hellstrom are possessed by a demonic entity, they attempt to claim the Eye of Agamotto from Doctor Voodoo, causing it to teleport to Avengers Mansion. Iron Fist finds the Eye and teleports away with it, causing a rift in the sky to appear. When Iron Fist returns to Earth, he claims that Strange stole the Eye rather than being given it by his master, challenging Strange to admit the truth. Noting that such a claim contradicts what the Ancient One taught him about the Eye, Strange realizes that the entity they are facing is Agamotto, who seeks to reclaim his Eye. The group attempt to defeat Agamotto by empowering Wolverine, but they are unsuccessful, with Voodoo sacrificing himself to banish Agamotto from Earth.

In Avengers 1,000,000 B.C., Agamotto is revealed to have been part of an ancient version of the Avengers.

== Powers and abilities ==
Agamotto can radiate a powerful mystical light that allows him to see through all disguises and illusions, see past events, and track both ethereal and corporeal beings by their psychic or magical emissions. Agamotto can weaken a variety of evil mystical beings, such as demons, devils, undead beings, dark extradimensional entities, and even sufficiently corrupt human practitioners of the Dark Arts. Agamotto can probe the minds of others, project a powerful mystical shield, and create portals to other dimensions. Agamotto can also place beings into suspended animation, and levitate objects with minimal effort. Agamotto can also transport a group of dozens of beings of all kinds and power levels into another point within a universe.

== In other media ==
Agamotto appears in Avengers Assemble, voiced by Corey Burton. This version was banished from Earth after being corrupted by power, with his right eye being removed and transformed into the Eye of Agamotto.
