= Jack O'Lantern (Marvel Comics) =

Marvel Comics fictional character

Jack O'Lantern is an alias used by several supervillains appearing in American comic books published by Marvel Comics.

== Publication history ==
Jason Macendale first appeared as Jack O'Lantern in Machine Man #19 (February 1981).

The Steve Levins incarnation of Jack O'Lantern first appeared in Captain America #396 (January 1992).

The Daniel Berkhart incarnation of Jack O'Lantern (a.k.a. Mad Jack) first appeared in The Spectacular Spider-Man #241 (December 1996).

The Maguire Beck incarnation of Jack O'Lantern (a.k.a. Mad Jack) first appeared in Spider-Man and Mysterio #1 (January 2001).

The Secret War incarnation of Jack O'Lantern first appeared in Secret War #1 (April 2004).

The Levins brother incarnation of Jack O'Lantern first appeared in Dark Reign: Made Men #1 (November 2009).

The Crime-Master's protégé incarnation of Jack O'Lantern first appeared in Venom #1 (May 2011).

The Jack O'Lantern imposter who encountered Venom first appeared in Venom #37 (September 2013).

The Owen Ward incarnation of Jack O'Lantern first appeared in Venom #1 (July 2018).

The Daniel Drumm incarnation of Jack O'Lantern, set on Earth-98091, first appeared in Supernaturals #1 (December 1998).

== Fictional character biography ==
=== Jason Macendale ===
Jason Macendale
- Jason Macendale as Jack O'Lantern encountering Spider-Man for the first time as seen from Peter Parker, the Spectacular Spider-Man #56.

Publication information
- Publisher: Marvel Comics
- First appearance: As Jack O'Lantern; Machine Man #19 (February 1981); As Hobgoblin; The Amazing Spider-Man #289 (June 1987)
- Created by: Tom DeFalco; Steve Ditko

In-story information
- Alter ego: Jason Philip Macendale, Jr.
- Species: Human mutate-cyborg
- Team affiliations: Gaunt
- Notable aliases: Jack O'Lantern, Hobgoblin, Jackie
- Abilities: Highly trained hand-to-hand combatant, martial artist, and spy Expert mechanical engineer and physicist Superhuman physical abilities due to Kraven the Hunter's formula and cybernetic implants. Use of various goblin-themed weapons and paraphernalia (When possessed by demon): Superhuman strength, speed, and agility Hellfire powers Ability to create organic fibers

Jason Macendale is a mercenary who was recruited out of college and trained by the CIA and various para-military organizations. Considered a liability due to his violent nature and amoral personality, this rejection turned Macendale to a career mercenary and ultimately a costumed terrorist. He adopts the Jack O'Lantern alter ego, initially battling Machine Man before becoming an enemy of Spider-Man.

=== Steven Mark Levins ===
Jack O'Lantern
- Steven Mark Levins's first appearance as Jack O'Lantern battling Captain America as seen in Captain America #396.

Publication information
- Publisher: Marvel Comics
- First appearance: Captain America #396 (January 1992)
- Created by: Mark Gruenwald; Rik Levins

In-story information
- Alter ego: Steven Mark Levins
- Species: Human
- Team affiliations: Skeleton Crew; Thunderbolts; Jack O'Lanterns
- Abilities: Wears pumpkin helmet and body armor Possesses variety of weapons and devices Use of a one-man hovercraft

The second version of Jack O'Lantern was introduced as an enemy of Captain America and Spider-Man.

Several years after his introduction, Jack O'Lantern was renamed "Mad Jack" and was heavily featured in the pages of The Spectacular Spider-Man during the late 1990s. Mad Jack was ultimately revealed to be the duo of Daniel Berkhart (formerly known as Mysterio) and Maguire Beck (Mysterio's cousin). It was not until the one-shot New Avengers Most Wanted (a character compendium) that the second iteration was confirmed as a separate entity: Steven Mark Levins.

Jack O'Lantern is a professional criminal who frequently works with Blackwing. With Blackwing, he joins the Skeleton Crew, the Red Skull's operatives.

Levins is recruited to serve as part of the Thunderbolts hero-hunting squad during the "Civil War" storyline. While pursuing Spider-Man through the Manhattan sewers alongside the Jester, Levins is killed by the Punisher. However, Levins is later reanimated and possessed by a fragment of Lucifer's soul. He now exhibits the ability to detach, levitate, and detonate his head, among other powers. However, the Ghost Rider exorcises Levins by ripping his heart from his chest, setting it aflame, and putting it back in his chest, causing it to explode inside.

During the "Dead No More: The Clone Conspiracy" storyline, Levins is resurrected by Jackal. He gets into a fight with the other clones, which is broken up by Prowler.

=== Daniel Berkhart ===
Jack O'Lantern

Publication information
- Publisher: Marvel Comics
- First appearance: As Mysterio; The Amazing Spider-Man #141 (February 1975); As Jack O'Lantern; The Spectacular Spider-Man #241 (December 1996)
- Created by: Gerry Conway; Ross Andru

In-story information
- Alter ego: Daniel Berkhart
- Species: Human
- Partnerships: J. Jonah Jameson
- Notable aliases: Mysterio, Mad Jack
- Abilities: Wears pumpkin helmet and body armor Possesses variety of weapons and devices Use of a one-man hovercraft and chemical weapons

Former Mysterio, Daniel Berkhart, is approached by Norman Osborn, who provides him a version of the Jack O'Lantern costume, under the "Mad Jack" alias. Under Osborn's orders, Berkhart kidnaps John Jameson and gives him mind-altering chemicals to turn him into the Man-Wolf again. Jameson is sent to attack his father J. Jonah Jameson to manipulate him into accepting Osborn's scheme to buy the Daily Bugle.

=== Maguire Beck ===
Mad Jack

Publication information
- Publisher: Marvel Comics
- First appearance: Spider-Man and Mysterio #1 (January 2001)
- Created by: Tom DeFalco; Lee Weeks

In-story information
- Alter ego: Maguire Beck
- Species: Human
- Notable aliases: Jack O'Lantern
- Abilities: Wears pumpkin helmet and body armor Possesses variety of weapons and devices Use of a one-man hovercraft and chemical weapons

After Berkhart's working relationship with Osborn ends when the Green Goblin participates in a magical ritual that renders him completely insane, Berkhart was then approached by Maguire Beck, the cousin of Quentin Beck (the original Mysterio). Maguire convinces Berkhart to re-assume the Mysterio identity following her cousin's suicide and the "Mad Jack" costumed identity is retired. When Berkhart and Beck seek to eliminate Spider-Man, Daredevil, J. Jonah Jameson and several other mutual enemies, the two revive the "Mad Jack" persona, utilizing robotic duplicates to serve as proxies. In the end, Maguire is caught and exposed though due to her usage of Berkhart androids, but Daredevil and Spider-Man were left unsure as to whether or not Berkhart was truly involved.

=== Jason Macendale imposter ===
An unnamed man posed as Jason Macendale, using both his civilian name and his Jack O'Lantern alias during Secret War.

=== Brother of Steven Levins ===
Jack O'Lantern

Publication information
- Publisher: Marvel Comics
- First appearance: Dark Reign: Made Men #1 (November 2009)
- Created by: John Paul Leon; Dave Stewart

In-story information
- Alter ego: Levins
- Species: Human mutate
- Abilities: Ability to transform into a jack-o'-lantern headed demon

Another version of Jack O'Lantern is introduced during the "Dark Reign" storyline. He is an unnamed man who claimed to be Steve Levins' brother. Jack O'Lantern is later caught by the police after killing the 15-year-old daughter of his neighbor and drinking his victim's blood as part of his plot to avenge Steve. This man was shown to be able to transform into a Jack O'Lantern-headed villain using the powers of a mystical demon. He is later released by a lawyer sent by Norman Osborn, who claims that Jack O'Lantern is a material witness to a national security case.

=== Crime-Master's Jack O'Lantern ===
Jack O'Lantern
- The Crime-Master's Jack O'Lantern's first cover appearance battling Agent Venom as seen from Venom #12 (March 2012). Art by Tony Moore and Dean White.

Publication information
- Publisher: Marvel Comics
- First appearance: Venom #1 (May 2011)
- Created by: Rick Remender; Tony Moore

In-story information
- Alter ego: Jack
- Species: Human
- Team affiliations: Assassins Guild; Astonishing Avengers; Savage Six
- Abilities: Wears pumpkin helmet and body armor Possesses variety of weapons and devices Use of a fleet of tiny flying cartoon-styled devil robots and a jet-powered "broomstick"

A new version of Jack O'Lantern appears working for the third Crime-Master. As a child, Jack O'Lantern disobeyed his parents and mistreated animals. While trick-or-treating, he came across the Crime-Master, who took him under his wing and trained him to be an assassin. It was with this training that the boy killed his parents.

One of his jobs brings him into conflict with the government operative Venom. During this conflict, Venom throws a live grenade into Jack O'Lantern's mouthpiece, dislocating his jaw and forcing him to retreat. Later, Crime-Master is able to use contacts to discover Venom's true identity Flash Thompson, and has Jack O'Lantern kidnap Betty Brant (Flash's girlfriend) in exchange for Venom letting Crime-Master get a shipment of Antarctic vibranium. When Venom leaves to rescue Betty, he is distracted by Spider-Man's appearance, which drives the Venom symbiote into an uncontrollable rage. Betty is rescued at the last second by Spider-Man, with Venom then trying to recapture Crime-Master. However, Venom is attacked by Jack O'Lantern who proclaims Flash as his first real nemesis, and desiring revenge for the disfiguring grenade explosion. Jack O'Lantern is a member of the Crime-Master's Savage Six.

During the "AXIS" storyline, Jack O'Lantern appears as a member of Magneto's group during the fight against Red Onslaught. His moral compass is inverted with all of those in Genosha when a spell meant to affect only the Red Skull affects everyone on the island. Jack O'Lantern joins the now-inverted villains to prevent the inverted X-Men from detonating a gene bomb which would have killed everyone on Earth who was not a mutant. When a reinversion spell is cast, Jack O'Lantern is evil once again.

Jack O'Lantern is hospitalized following a battle with Deadpool and undergoes extensive therapy and plastic surgery to restore his face. Jack O'Lantern is released to civilian life, but becomes bored almost immediately and returns to supervillainy. After following Deadpool to Wakanda, Jack O'Lantern battles both Deadpool and Black Panther until Deadpool kills him.

=== Owen Ward ===
Jack O'Lantern

Publication information
- Publisher: Marvel Comics
- First appearance: Venom #1 (#166) (July 2018)
- Created by: Donny Cates; Ryan Stegman

In-story information
- Alter ego: Owen Ward
- Species: Human

Petty criminal Owen Ward stumbles upon the Jack O'Lantern equipment and becomes a supervillain and an arms dealer. He supplies weapons to criminals from Norman Osborn's armory, which attracts the attention of Venom and the police. Venom goes berserk and rips out his left eye.

In the storyline "The War of the Realms", Jack O'Lantern finds one of Malekith the Accursed's War Witches, having teleported into his apartment following a fight with a Dreamstone-enhanced Eddie Brock. Seeing as they have a mutual enemy in Venom, the War Witch conjures another Dreamstone and gives it to Jack O'Lantern.

== Powers and abilities ==
Jason Macendale originally possessed no superhuman powers, but used similar paraphernalia to the Hobgoblin and the Green Goblin; both his Jack O'Lantern and Hobgoblin personas used a rocket-powered glider, pumpkin bombs, and gauntlet blasters. During the time in which a demon was grafted to him, he had superhuman strength, speed, and agility, as well as hellfire powers enabling him to create weapons and gliders at will. It is implied that his demonic abilities allowed him to create organic fibers strong enough to bind a normal person. After acquiring Kraven the Hunter's formula, Macendale had enhanced his strength, speed, stamina, durability, reflexes, and agility to superhuman levels, thanks to anomalies in his blood left over when he and Demogoblin were one, but this formula's effects seemed to have later wore off. His later cybernetically enhanced body thanks to Mendel Stromm further increased his strength, speed, reflexes, durability, and stamina. Macendale had extensive military training in hand-to-hand combat, martial arts, espionage, and knowledge of conventional weaponry. He often used conventional military weapons. When he adopted the Hobgoblin persona, he was able to make improvements to the Goblin glider's maneuverability by utilizing skills he gained from his master's degrees in both mechanical engineering and physics. Macendale was also a sociopath and a sadist, which led to his dishonorable discharge from the military.

Steven Levins modeled his Jack O'Lantern costume and equipment after those created by his predecessor. Levins wore a complete body armor made of metal-mesh covered in multi-segmented Kevlar panels, incorporating a rigid, articulated shell which can resist a 7-pound bazooka anti-tank warhead. He wore a bulletproof helmet with an internal three hour, compressed air supply. The helmet is equipped with a telescopic infrared image-intensifier for seeing in the dark and 360 degree scanning device for seeing all around himself. The base of the helmet is equipped with a fine network of pinholes which maintain a low temperature, low density flame ("stage-fire") that rings the helmet at all times. The air supply cools the helmet's interior. The helmet is padded to protect his head from injury. Levins is armed with wrist-blasters which can deliver an electrical shock within a range of 35 feet (11 m). He also used various types of grenades, including anesthetic, lachrymatory (tear gas), hallucinogenic, and regurgitant gas grenades, smoke grenades, and concussion grenades. The grenades are shaped like spheres or pumpkins. He can fire small grenades from wrist devices. He can also release "ghost-grabbers" which are thick, semi-transparent films which adhere to a victim. Levins rides atop a one-man hovercraft with an electric motor powered by a high density lithium rechargeable battery.

Daniel Berkhart used the same weapons as the previous incarnations of Jack O'Lantern, along with chemical weapons that cause psychedelic and mind-bending hallucinations. His accomplice Maguire Beck was an expert designer of special effects devices and stage illusions, a master hypnotist, and skilled in chemistry and robotics, including a lifelike robotic black cat. Beck has used her advanced knowledge of computer imaging and virtual reality to improve upon Mysterio's techniques, allowing for Beck to pretend to be Mad Jack via proxies while safely hidden in her secret lair.

The brother of Levins can transform into a demon with the head of a jack-o'-lantern using the powers of an unknown mystical demon.

The fifth incarnation, along with the same general weapons the previous ones used, has a fleet of tiny flying cartoon-styled devil robots. Instead of a hovercraft, he rides a jet-powered "broomstick".

== Reception ==
In 2021, Screen Rant included the Unknown Jack O'Lantern in their "10 Best Marvel Legacy Villains Who Lived Up To Their Predecessor" list.

== Other versions ==
=== Earth-Chaos ===
An original alternate universe version of Jack O'Lantern, Daniel Drumm, appears in The Supernaturals. This version was reborn as Jack O'Lantern after apparently being incinerated in a dark ceremony he had been performing. Drumm attempts to take over Earth, only to be thwarted and sent to another dimension.

=== MC2 ===
An alternate universe version of Maguire Beck appears in the MC2 imprint.

=== Spider-Geddon ===
An alternate universe version of Jack O'Lantern appears in Spider-Geddon.

== In other media ==
=== Television ===
- An original incarnation of Jack O'Lantern appears in the Ultimate Spider-Man episode "Halloween Night at the Museum". This version is the result of Morgan le Fay transforming an unnamed security guard (voiced by Drake Bell) into a pumpkin-headed demon to fight Spider-Man. When Morgan is defeated, the guard is returned to normal.
- An unidentified incarnation of Jack O'Lantern appears in the Spider-Man episode "Bring on the Bad Guys: Part Three", voiced by Booboo Stewart. This version is obsessed with Halloween.
- An original incarnation of Jack O'Lantern appears in Spidey and the Avengers: Halloween Team-Up, voiced by Patrick Stump. This version is an ordinary jack o'lantern who was brought to life by Hallows' Eve.

=== Video games ===
- The Jason Macendale incarnation of Jack O'Lantern appears as a mini-boss in Spider-Man.
- The Steven Levins incarnation of Jack O'Lantern makes a cameo appearance in Marvel Ultimate Alliance 2.
- The fourth incarnation of Jack O'Lantern appears as a boss in Marvel Avengers Alliance.
- The Jason Macendale incarnation of Jack O'Lantern appears as a boss in Spider-Man Unlimited, voiced by Travis Willingham.
- The fourth incarnation of Jack O'Lantern appears in Marvel Avengers Academy, voiced by Matthew Curtis.
- The Jason Macendale incarnation of Jack O'Lantern appears as a costume for the Green Goblin in Marvel Heroes.

=== Merchandise ===
The demonic version of Jason Macendale appears in the Spider-Man Classics line, which was later reworked for Marvel Legends' "Sinister Six" set and repainted as a Demogoblin figure.
