= Avengers Mansion =

Fictional building

- The New Avengers moving into Avengers Mansion in New Avengers (vol. 2) #1 (August 2010). Art by Stuart Immonen.
- First appearance: The Avengers #2 (November 1963)
- Created by: Stan Lee; Jack Kirby

In-universe information
- Other name: Avengers Embassy
- Type: Residence
- Location: United States, New York City
- Characters: Iron Man; Captain America; Hulk; Hank Pym; Thor Odinson; Carol Danvers; Black Panther; Vision; Scarlet Witch; Avengers; New Avengers; Uncanny Avengers
- Publisher: Marvel Comics

Avengers Mansion is a fictional building appearing in American comic books published by Marvel Comics. It has traditionally been the base of the Avengers. The enormous, city block-sized building is located at 890 Fifth Avenue, Manhattan, New York City.

== Creative origin ==
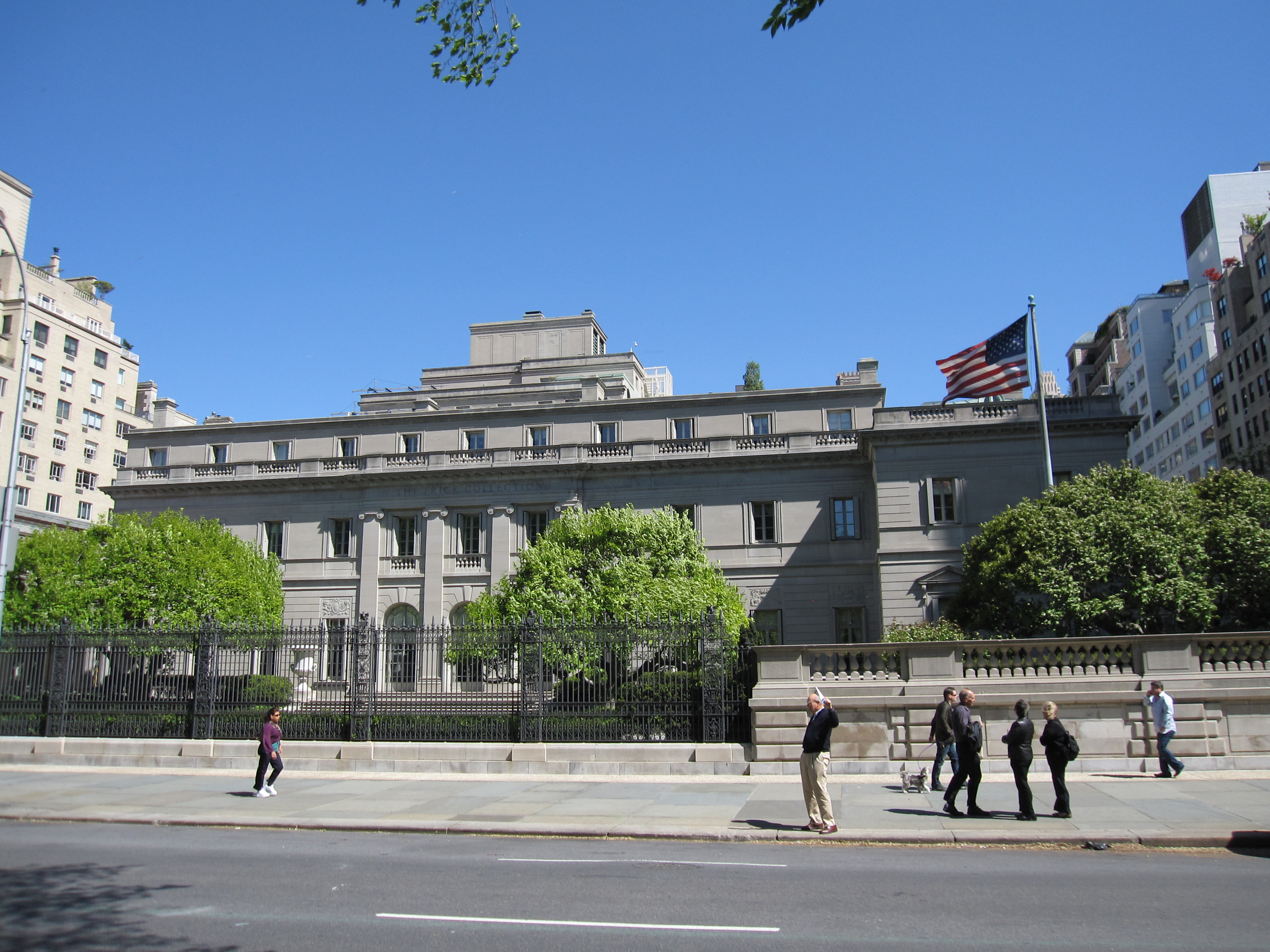
The Henry Clay Frick House on 5th Avenue was the inspiration for the Avengers Mansion

Avengers Mansion's address is 890 Fifth Avenue in the borough of Manhattan in New York City. According to Stan Lee, who co-created the Avengers:

There was a mansion called the Frick Museum that I used to walk past. I sort of modeled it after that. Beautiful, big, so impressive building, right on Fifth Avenue.

Lee later recounted, "I can't tell you how many fan letters I would receive from kids saying, 'We came to New York and we were looking for the Stark mansion and couldn't find it. What address is it?' [laughs] So that made me feel good. I felt we had accomplished our objective. We had made it seem realistic." In real life, 890 Fifth Avenue is 1 East 70th Street, the location of the Henry Clay Frick House.

== Fictional history and layout ==
When occupied, the mansion was originally the Stark family manor, until their only son, Tony Stark, inherited their fortune and soon took on the guise of Iron Man. He donated the mansion to the Avengers and had it financed through the charitable Maria Stark Foundation. It was primarily looked after by the Stark family butler, Edwin Jarvis, who not only took care of the mansion but also catered to the needs of the Avengers team. It served as a place to plan and strategize and a home for Avengers members when they needed it.

It had three above-ground floors and three basement floors. The first three floors were open to the public and had twelve rooms to house Avengers who wished to reside in the mansion, as well as Jarvis's quarters. A portion of the mansion's third floor served as a hangar for the Avengers' Quinjets, their primary mode of transportation. The Mansion is surrounded by a wall twelve feet high and one foot thick, as well as an array of high-tech security defenses.

The mansion has been destroyed twice. The first time was in Avengers: Under Siege when the Masters of Evil, led by Helmut Zemo, attack the Avengers and destroy the Mansion before being repelled. Later, the Avengers built a new headquarters on the site of the Mansion and resided there until it was destroyed by the Gatherers, a team of alternate universe Avengers. Ute, a Watcher enslaved by Proctor, brings an alternate reality version of the original Avengers Mansion to the site as a dying gift.

This replacement Mansion would survive various assaults until it is destroyed by Jack of Hearts in the storyline "Avengers Disassembled". Tony Stark decides that, with his dwindling assets, he can no longer afford to maintain the building. The Mansion is abandoned in its derelict state, left as a memorial to the Avengers who had died.

Following the Siege of Asgard and at the start of the Heroic Age, Steve Rogers and Tony Stark sell the mansion to Luke Cage, who uses it as a base for the New Avengers. The other Avengers operate from the Infinite Avengers Mansion and Avengers Tower. After the New Avengers dissolve, Cage sells the mansion back to Stark.

After yet another roster reshuffling, the mansion is refitted as the headquarters for the Avengers Unity Squad. Following the reconstruction of the multiverse, the mansion is converted into a hotel as the Avengers move on to other bases. After this, the mansion is purchased by Unity Squad member Johnny Storm on behalf of the Avengers. The Avengers return to using the mansion as a base after the establishment of the Avengers Emergency Response Squad.

== Avengers support crew ==
- Arnold "Arnie" Roth - Publicist (deceased)
- William "Bill" Foster (Giant-Man) - Avengers Compound contractor (deceased)
- Robert "Bob" Frank Jr. (Nuklo) - Janitor and groundskeeper of Avengers Mansion.
- David Cannon - Cannon is primarily known as the villain Whirlwind. Under the identity Charles Matthews, he briefly worked as Janet van Dyne's chauffeur before being exposed.
- Edwin Jarvis - Butler and chief of staff. He was the former butler of the Stark family.
- Fabian Stankowicz - Initially an enemy of the Avengers, Stankowicz later joined their support team.
- Henry Peter Gyrich - National Security Council liaison.
- Hank Pym - Avengers Compound majordomo and biochemist.
- Jane Foster - Team physician.
- Jeryn Hogarth - Lawyer.
- John Jameson - Pilot.
- Peggy Carter - Communications chief.
- Raymond Sikorski - National Security Council liaison.
- Zachary Moonhunter - Pilot.

== Reception ==
=== Accolades ===
- In 2019, CBR.com ranked the Avengers Mansion 3rd in their "10 Most Iconic Superhero Hideouts In Marvel Comics" list.
- In 2020, CBR.com ranked the Avengers Mansion 1st in their "Avengers 10 Best Headquarters" list.
- In 2022, CBR.com ranked the Avengers Mansion 3rd in their "9 Coolest Training Facilities In Marvel Comics" list.

== Infinite Avengers Mansion ==
The Infinite Avengers Mansion was created by Hank Pym in the pocket dimension where Thor sent Janet Van Dyne's body at the end of Secret Invasion. It was the headquarters of Hank Pym's Mighty Avengers and was home to the Avengers Academy.

== In other media ==
=== Television ===
- The Avengers Mansion appears in The Avengers: United They Stand.
- The Avengers Mansion appears in The Avengers: Earth's Mightiest Heroes.
- The Avengers Mansion appears in the Avengers Assemble two-part episode "The Avengers Protocol".

=== Video games ===
- The Avengers Mansion appears in Marvel: Avengers Alliance.
- The Avengers Mansion appears in Marvel Nemesis: Rise of the Imperfects.
- The Avengers Mansion appears in Lego Marvel Super Heroes. This version is located in Washington Heights, Manhattan.
- The Avengers Mansion appears in Lego Marvel Super Heroes 2.

== See also ==
- X-Mansion
- Baxter Building
- Stark Tower
