= Official Handbook of the Marvel Universe =

Guide detailing the fictional universe

The Official Handbook of the Marvel Universe is an encyclopedic guide which details the fictional universe featured in Marvel Comics publications. The original 15-volume series was published in comic book format in 1982, followed by sporadic updates.

== Origin ==
Jim Shooter, Marvel's then editor-in-chief, conceived the idea of envisioning a guide detailing statistics much in the manner of those found upon the back of baseball cards. This initial project was to be called The Marvel Super-Specifications Handbook (the eventual title incorporating the term "Marvel Universe" was appropriated from Al Milgrom, who used it as a working title for the anthology series Marvel Fanfare). Shooter appointed Mark Gruenwald editor of the project, and Gruenwald developed the project to include all aspects of the Marvel Universe, although he noted it was not comprehensive. In addition to Gruenwald, contributing writers on the initial volume were Marvel editors Mike Carlin, Eliot R. Brown, and Peter Sanderson. Gruenwald brought in Josef Rubinstein to be the sole inker of the project because he felt Rubinstein was best able to make the characters easily recognizable and to subvert his own style to that of the handbook's various pencillers.

Critics of the Handbook have argued that the level of detail within the guide effectively limited the ability of writers to innovate, a charge Gruenwald dismissed, reputedly stating that the information presented was only the most recent data and was subject to change. Sanderson, one of the writers of the original guide, noted that "Mark sought to make the Marvel characters' super-powers as firm a basis in real science as possible. After the first version of the Handbook, Mark decided that some of the explanations had grown too complicated, and asked me to simplify them."

The OHOTMU detailed the more significant characters, items and locations in the Marvel Universe, itemizing them into individual entries. Individual entries usually consisted of:

- A frontal full-body view of the character.
- Prose text describing the character's origin, powers, and other abilities and unique traits, as well as statistics such as their place of birth, former aliases, and physical features. The original edition opted only to describe the "origins" of characters (how they acquired their powers), instead focusing heavily on detailed explanations for how those powers functioned. In the Book of the Dead supplement, however, the handbook provided entire "histories" for the deceased characters, a trend which was then adopted for the main body of the Deluxe Edition, allowing the entire life and career of the characters to be covered. Major important pieces of equipment were also given technical illustrations with breakdowns of their functions and features.
- Example images of the character in action, taken directly from the comics themselves.

In the original, characters were listed at one character to a page, although minor characters were sometimes listed at two to a page and major characters would occasionally receive more than one page. In the Deluxe Edition, every character received at least one page, with significant characters receiving up to 3-5 pages. Both editions had wraparound covers that could be linked together to form a giant poster. In the late 1980s, a poster made up of the first twelve issues of the original Handbook was released. For the poster, several characters were added and others received up-to-date looks.

In the Master Edition (1990–1993) this changed and every character was allocated a double-sided loose leaf page. Later versions allocate characters different lengths of entry depending on their history and importance.

== Publication history ==
There have been several versions of the concept since it was first published in 1982:

- 1982-1984: a 15-issue series. Issues #13-14 are titled the Book of the Dead and Inactive, featuring characters and groups who were, at the time, believed dead or inactive. Issue #15 is titled the Book of Weapons, Hardware, and Paraphernalia, featuring technical drawings of equipment such as Captain America's shield and Spider-Man's web shooters. One issue of the series (#9) can be seen in the movie Explorers.
- 1985-1988: a 20-issue Deluxe Edition is published; technical drawings of equipment are incorporated into individual characters' entries. Although numerous entries reference an Appendix, the Deluxe Edition Appendix is not published. This run was also collected in trade paperback format, in a series of 10 128-page volumes. The trade edition also feature updates of many characters. Supplements for licensed properties are published, including Conan the Barbarian, G.I. Joe, and the Transformers.
- 1989: An additional eight-issue supplement to the Deluxe Edition, denoted Update '89 on the cover, is published. This series covers primarily new characters and is notable for including numerous non-superhumans. This series also sported wraparound covers but, unlike previous versions, these did not link together.
- 1990-1993: A 36-issue Master Edition series is published, with each issue a shrink-wrapped pack of loose-leaf pages. A three-ring vinyl binder was also released for the pages to be inserted into.
- 2004-2005: Themed one-shot supplements are published, such as Official Handbook to the Marvel Universe: X-Men 2004. Other entries in this themed, subtitled series include Spider-Man 2004; Avengers 2004; Hulk 2004; Daredevil 2004; Wolverine 2004; Golden Age 2004; Women of Marvel 2005 and Avengers 2005.
- 2006: A new 12-issue series, the All-New OHOTMU A-Z, was published featuring new characters. A series of themed one-shot issues was also published in the same style as the 2004-2005 books, including Civil War Files which tied in with Marvel's Civil War crossover series. The original Handbook, original 20-issue Deluxe Edition, and the Update '89 edition were also reprinted in five Essential volumes.
- 2007: Four A-Z Update issues, six themed issues (including World War Hulk: Gamma Files and X-Men: Messiah Complex - Mutant Files) and the first issue of the Marvel Atlas are published.
- 2008: All material from 2004-2007 is updated and printed in the Official Handbook of the Marvel Universe A-Z Premiere HC set, divided into 14 volumes (each containing 240 pages). The second issue of the Marvel Atlas is published. Other publications included Ultimate Secrets, All-New Iron Manual, Secret Invasion: Skrulls!, and Amazing Spider-Man: Brand New Day Yearbook.
- 2009: The Official Handbook of the Marvel Universe A-Z Premiere HC set continued publication. A sister project to the Handbook, the Official Index to the Marvel Universe monthly series, began publication in January. Other forthcoming titles include Dark Reign Files and Wolverine: Weapon X Files.

== Bibliography of Official Handbook series ==
=== The Official Handbook of the Marvel Universe Vol. I ===
Original Series #1 - 15 (Marvel Comics, January 1983 - May 1984)
| # | Title | Month of publ. |
|---|---|---|
| 1 | A from Abomination to Avengers Quinjet | January 1983 |
| 2 | B - C from Baron Mordo to Collective Man | February 1983 |
| 3 | C - D from Collector to Dracula | March 1983 |
| 4 | D - G from Dragon Man to Gypsy Moth | April 1983 |
| 5 | H - J from Hangman to Juggernaut | May 1983 |
| 6 | K - M from Kang the Conqueror to Man-Bull | June 1983 |
| 7 | M from Mandarin to Mystique | July 1983 |
| 8 | N - P from Namorita to Pyro | August 1983 |
| 9 | Q - S from Quasar to She-Hulk | September 1983 |
| 10 | S from Shi'ar to Sub-Mariner | October 1983 |
| 11 | S - U from Subterraneans to Ursa Major | November 1983 |
| 12 | V - Z from Valkyrie to Zzzax | December 1983 |
| 13 | Book of the Dead and Inactive I: Air-Walker to Man-Wolf | February 1984 |
| 14 | Book of the Dead and Inactive II: Marvel Boy to Zuras | March 1984 |
| 15 | Book of Weapons, Hardware, and Paraphernalia | April 1984 |

Reprint Essential OHOTMU (Trade paperback, B/W) #1 (Marvel Comics, January 2006)
| # | Info | ISBN | Month of publ. |
|---|---|---|---|
| 1 | Abomination to Zzzax; Book of the Dead and Inactive: Air-Walker to Zuras; Book of Weapons, Hardware, and Paraphernalia | ISBN 0-7851-1933-7 | January 2006 |

=== The Official Handbook of the Marvel Universe Vol. II (Deluxe Edition) ===
Original Series #1 - 20 and Update '89 #1 - 8 (Marvel Comics, December 1985 - December 1989)
| Series | # | Info | Month of publ. |
|---|---|---|---|
| Original | 1 | Abomination to Batroc's Brigade | December 1985 |
| Original | 2 | Beast to Clea | January 1986 |
| Original | 3 | Cloak to Doctor Octopus | February 1986 |
| Original | 4 | Doctor Strange to Galactus' Heralds | March 1986 |
| Original | 5 | Gardener to Hulkbusters | April 1986 |
| Original | 6 | Human Torch to Ka-Zar | May 1986 |
| Original | 7 | Khoryphos to Magneto | June 1986 |
| Original | 8 | Magus to Mole Man | July 1986 |
| Original | 9 | Molecule Man to Owl | August 1986 |
| Original | 10 | Paladin to Rhino | September 1986 |
| Original | 11 | Richard Rider to Sidewinder | October 1986 |
| Original | 12 | Sif to Sunspot | November 1986 |
| Original | 13 | Super-Adaptoid to Umar | December 1986 |
| Original | 14 | Unicorn to Wolverine | January 1987 |
| Original | 15 | Wonder Man to Zzzax plus Appendix: Alien Races | March 1987 |
| Original | 16 | Book of the Dead: Air-Walker to Death-Stalker | June 1987 |
| Original | 17 | Book of the Dead: Destiny to Hobgoblin | August 1987 |
| Original | 18 | Book of the Dead: Hyperion to Nighthawk | October 1987 |
| Original | 19 | Book of the Dead: Nuke to Obadiah Stane | December 1987 |
| Original | 20 | Book of the Dead: Stick to Zuras | February 1988 |
| Update '89 | 1 | Adversary to Chameleon | July 1989 |
| Update '89 | 2 | Champion of the Universe to Ecstasy | August 1989 |
| Update '89 | 3 | Eon to Hulk | September 1989 |
| Update '89 | 4 | Human Torch to Manikin | October 1989 |
| Update '89 | 5 | Marauders to Power Princess | November 1989 |
| Update '89 | 6 | Prowler to Serpent Society | Late November 1989 |
| Update '89 | 7 | Set to Tyrak | December 1989 |
| Update '89 | 8 | U-Man to Madelyne Pryor | Late December 1989 |

Reprints (trade paperback) (Marvel Comics, September 1990 - November 1993 and 2006)
| Series | # | Info | ISBN | Month of publ. |
|---|---|---|---|---|
| Original (trade paperback) | 1 | Abomination to Circus of Crime | ISBN 0-87135-208-7 | September 1990 |
| Original (trade paperback) | 2 | Clea to Gaea | ISBN 0-87135-209-5 | November 1990 |
| Original (trade paperback) | 3 | Galactus to Kang the Conqueror | ISBN 0-87135-210-9 | October 1991 |
| Original (trade paperback) | 4 | Karkas to Mister Fantastic | ISBN 0-87135-211-7 | October 1991 |
| Original (trade paperback) | 5 | Mister Fear to Quicksilver | ISBN 0-87135-212-5 | February 1992 |
| Original (trade paperback) | 6 | Radioactive Man to Stilt-Man | ISBN 0-87135-213-3 | October 1992 |
| Original (trade paperback) | 7 | Stingray to Wendigo | ISBN 0-87135-214-1 | November 1992 |
| Original (trade paperback) | 8 | Werewolf by Night to Zzzax; Book of the Dead: Air-Walker to Lemuel Dorcas | ISBN 0-87135-215-X | October 1993 |
| Original (trade paperback) | 9 | Book of the Dead: Dorma to Patriot | ISBN 0-87135-353-9 | November 1993 |
| Original (trade paperback) | 10 | Book of the Dead: Phantom Eagle to Zuras | ISBN 0-87135-366-0 | November 1993 |
| Original (trade paperback) | contains material from the original series (without Update '89) | | | |
| Essential (trade paperback, B/W) | 1 | Abomination to Magneto | ISBN 0-7851-1934-5 | March 2006 |
| Essential (trade paperback, B/W) | 2 | Magus to Wolverine | ISBN 0-7851-1935-3 | June 2006 |
| Essential (trade paperback, B/W) | 3 | Wonder Man to Zzzax plus Appendix: Alien Races; Book of the Dead: Air-Walker to Zuras | ISBN 0-7851-1936-1 | July 2006 |
| Essential (trade paperback, B/W) | 4 | Update '89: Adversary to Madelyne Pryor | ISBN 0-7851-1937-X | December 2006 |

=== The Official Handbook of the Marvel Universe Vol. III (Master Edition) ===
Original Series #1 - 36 (Marvel Comics, December 1990 - November 1993)
| # | Info | Month of publ. |
|---|---|---|
| 1 | Model sheets: Anaconda, Blue Shield, Corsair, Counterweight, Dormammu, Foxfire, Gorgon, Agatha Harkness, Juggernaut, Llyra, Midnight Sun, MODAM, Moon-Boy, Nebulon, Oneg the Prober, Puck, Ronan the Accuser, Spider-Man, Starfox, Stranger, Trickshot, Typhoid Mary, Watchdogs, Zuras | December 1990 |
| 2 | Model sheets: Awesome Android, Ulysses Bloodstone, Captain America, Destiny, Doctor Octopus, Eel, Forge, Grey Gargoyle, Howard the Duck, ISAAC, Kubik, Leader, Moonstone, Mother Night, Nitro, Orka, Plantman, Quicksilver, Rock Python, Scorpio, Sise-Neg, Triton, Volcana, Water Wizard | January 1991 |
| 3 | Model sheets: A.I.M., Baron Mordo, Big Bertha, Cable, Diamondback, Electro, Firelord, Gargantua, Ghost Rider, Heimdall, Ka-Zar, Man-Ape, Mister Fantastic, Morgan le Fay, Naga, Porcupine, Razorback, Shocker, Sunder, Thunderbird, Venus, Whizzer, Wrecker, Zaran | February 1991 |
| 4 | Model sheets: Apocalypse, Baron Zemo, Blastaar, Carrion, Devastator, Doctor Minerva, Executioner, Grim Reaper, Hammer, King Cobra, Living Mummy, Madame Web, Malekith the Accursed, Mister Jip, Nikki, Puppet Master, Red Raven, Shadowcat, Shape, Texas Twister, U-Man, Vector, Wolverine, Ziran the Tester | March 1991 |
| 5 | Model sheets: Abomination, Blizzard, Boomerang, Captain Marvel, Crimson Dynamo, Dagger, Doctor Malus, Eternity, Fandral, Guardian, In-Betweener, Knickknack, Magma, Man-Thing, Mesmero, Nighthawk, Owl, Punisher, Quasimodo, Sleeper, Speed Demon, Titania, Vulture, Wizard | April 1991 |
| 6 | Model sheets: Astronomer, Bullseye, Cannonball, Copperhead, Darkoth, Fixer, Gatecrasher, Hela, Hobgoblin, Immortus, Leir, Mirage, Mister Sinister, Mordred, Nomad, One Above All, Professor Power, Rintrah, She-Hulk, Starlight, Thin Man, Ursa Major, Vertigo, Whirlwind | May 1991 |
| 7 | Model sheets: Armadillo, Barbarus, Black Knight, Callisto, Cypher, Daredevil, Egghead, Firestar, Goldbug, Hangman, Jack Frost, Karnilla, Lizard, Magneto, Marvel Boy, Mercurio, Nova, Psycho-Man, Red Ronin, Shaper of Worlds, Slug, Stilt-Man, Ulik, Valkin | June 1991 |
| 8 | Model sheets: Attuma, Blacklash, Captain Ultra, Colossus, Devil Dinosaur, Dragon Man, Elektra, Gladiator, Hulk, Jackal, Kang the Conqueror, Lamprey, Machete, Makkari, Manslaughter, Nighthawk, Piledriver, Quicksand, Shang-Chi, Spider-Woman, Supreme Intelligence, Tyrannus, Viper, Woodgod | July 1991 |
| 9 | Model sheets: Air-Walker, Black Panther, Brother Tode, Chameleon, Doc Samson, Ego the Living Planet, Firebird, Gremlin, Hyperion, Isis, Lightspeed, Machinesmith, Moon Knight, Overmind, Phantom Eagle, Rocket Raccoon, Scarlet Witch, Silver Dagger, Skids, Taskmaster, Vidar, Colleen Wing, Xemnu, Zarek | August 1991 |
| 10 | Model sheets: Ajak, Black Talon, Blob, Captain Britain, Constrictor, Doctor Faustus, Grandmaster, Hercules, Jigsaw, Misty Knight, Llan the Sorcerer, Mad Thinker, Miss America, N'astirh, Odin, Poundcakes, Red Ghost, Seth, Siryn, Thanos, Umar, Venom, Wong, X-Ray | September 1991 |
| 11 | Model sheets: Ares, Balor, Cloak, Crucible, Death Adder, Gilgamesh, Hydro-Man, Impossible Man, Jocasta, Kronos, Lupo, Master Order, Multiple Man, Nezarr the Calculator, Oddball, Power Princess, Rocket Racer, Spider-Woman, Storm, Tana Nile, Tinkerer, Vanguard, White Tiger, Yellow Claw | October 1991 |
| 12 | Model sheets: Aguila, Andromeda, Black Cat, Centurius, Crossbones, D'Spayre, Frenzy, Goliath, Helio, Jack of Hearts, Karnak, Loki, Melter, Mister Hyde, Nightcrawler, Piper, Puff Adder, Runner, Satannish, Silver Surfer, Spitfire, Taurus, Uni-Mind, Whiplash | November 1991 |
| 13 | Model Sheets: Arabian Knight, Blood Brothers, Bullet, Contemplator, Diablo, Dreadknight, Fer-de-Lance, High Evolutionary, Iceman, Mad Dog, Master of the World, Mysterio, Northstar, Phoenix, Quasar, Ringmaster, Shroud, Surtur, Thundra, Tiger Shark, ULTIMATUM, Werewolf by Night; Action Sheet: Spider-Man / Team Action Sheet: Fantastic Four | December 1991 |
| 14 | Model sheets: Annihilus, Beast, Black Knight, Champion of the Universe, Darkstar, Eon, Gargoyle, Jetstream, Kurse, Mentor, Modred the Mystic, Mongoose, Namorita, Prowler, Rhino, Sidewinder, Sphinx, Super Sabre, Thor, Tombstone, Wendigo; Action Sheets: Captain America, Spider-Man (Web-Shooters) / Team Action Sheet: Fantastic Four (Replacements) | January 1992 |
| 15 | Model sheets: Ant-Man, Brothers Grimm, Bushwacker, Charlie-27, Crystal, Deathurge, Frankenstein's Monster, Garokk, Guardsman, Hate-Monger, Iron Man, Killer Shrike, Mangog, Moonglow, Omega, Princess Python, Rogue, Sandman, Saturnyne, Space Phantom, Tyr, Adam Warlock; Action Sheet: Ghost Rider / Team Action Sheet: Avengers (First Line-Up) | February 1992 |
| 16 | Model sheets: Absorbing Man, Baron Strucker, Cyclops, Darkhawk, Force, Graviton, Hawkeye, Jemiah the Analyzer, Kofi, Lava Men, Martinex, Midas, Mole Man, Pluto, Sabretooth, Spymaster, Stallior, Tatterdemalion, Vamp, Yellowjacket, Zzzax; Action Sheet: Wolverine / Team Action Sheet: Avengers (Second Line-Up) | March 1992 |
| 17 | Model sheets: 3-D Man, Ancient One, Black Queen, Brother Voodoo, Count Nefaria, Death-Stalker, Eson the Searcher, Glob, Havok, Kingpin, Lady Deathstrike, Maelstrom, MODOK, Namor, Paladin, Red Guardian, Sasquatch, Scorpion, Thunderball, Vishanti, Worm; Action Sheet: Punisher / Team Action Sheet: Avengers (Third Line-Up) | April 1992 |
| 18 | Model sheets: Arishem the Judge, Beetle, Bulldozer, Clea, Demolition Man, Fang, Ghaur, Hogun, Ironclad, Kangaroo, Lucifer, Madcap, Moondragon, Nebula, Professor X, Razor Fist, Nicholas Scratch, Spirit of '76, Thing, Wolfsbane, Zaladane; Action Sheet: She-Hulk / Team Action Sheet: Avengers (Fourth Line-Up) | May 1992 |
| 19 | Model sheets: Apollo, Battle Star, Ch'od, Doctor Demonicus, Earth Lord, Gamora, Iron Monger, Rick Jones, Major Victory, Mandarin, Marrina Smallwood, Nova, Oracle, Ringer, Satana, Shatterstar, Tom Thumb, Ultimus, White Bishop, Zodiac; Action Sheet: Daredevil / Team Action Sheet: Avengers (Fifth Line-Up) | June 1992 |
| 20 | Model sheets: Archangel, Baron Blood, Black Knight, Captain Atlas, Controller, Doctor Doom, Enchantress, Flag-Smasher, Ghost, Korvac, Lilandra Neramani, Maha Yogi, Maximus, Nuke, Quantum, Redstone, Sabra, Silvermane, Unicorn, Wasp, Wolverine, Zarrko; Team Action Sheet: Avengers (Sixth Line-Up) | July 1992 |
| 21 | Model sheets: Aquarian, Banshee, Bi-Beast, Crossfire, Dakimh the Enchanter, Dominic Fortune, Gambit, Haywire, Invisible Woman, Jester, Karkas, Living Laser, Mantis, Master Man, Occult, Power Broker, Red Wolf, Speedball, Swordsman, Thena, Thor, Uatu, Will o' the Wisp | August 1992 |
| 22 | Model sheets: Arcade, Black Bolt, Bushmaster, Crimson Commando, Diamond Lil, Doctor Nightshade, Nick Fury, Gammenon the Gatherer, Hermes, Kismet, Madame Masque, Merlin, Phantom Rider, Screaming Mimi, Silver Sable, Slither, Starbolt, Terrax, Ultron, Volstagg, Whizzer, Yondu; Team Action Sheet: Avengers (Seventh Line-Up) | September 1992 |
| 23 | Model sheets: Arkon, Batroc the Leaper, Blonde Phantom, Cage, Chthon, Collector, Doctor Spectrum, Falcon, Glorian, Hammerhead, It! The Living Colossus, Krang, Left-Winger, Mockingbird, Psylocke, Radioactive Man, Sauron, Silhouette, Supremor, Tarantula, Unus the Untouchable, Vermin; Team Action Sheet: X-Men (First Line-Up) | October 1992 |
| 24 | Model sheets: Ape-Man, Johnny Blaze, Byrrah, Chemistro, Cyclone, Deathbird, Drax the Destroyer, Gladiator, Horus, Human Torch, Iron Fist, Jubilee, Klaw, Machine Man, Medusa, Phoenix, Prester John, Red Skull, Stingray, Terminatrix, Trump, Zeus; Team Action Sheet: X-Men (Second Line-Up) | November 1992 |
| 25 | Model sheets: Black Widow, Bucky, Cottonmouth, Deadpool, Fin Fang Foom, Guardian, Hepzibah, Infinity, Hannibal King, Mirage, Mister Fear, Night Thrasher, Osiris, Peregrine, Quagmire, Rama-Tut, Silver Samurai, Stellaris, Strong Guy, Terminus, Vibro, Wind Warrior; Team Action Sheet: X-Men (Third Line-Up) | December 1992 |
| 26 | Model sheets: Aginar, Belasco, Boomer, Caber, Chondu the Mystic, Doctor Druid, Foreigner, Jean Grey, Halflife, Ikaris, Jarella, Lockjaw, Molten Man, Mystique, Neptune, Orb, Psyklop, Rattler, Stryfe, Super-Skrull, Titan, Windshear; Team Action Sheet: X-Men (Fourth Line-Up) | January 1993 |
| 27 | Model sheets: Anvil, Asp, Bengal, Beta Ray Bill, Cat-Man, Deathlok, Devos the Devastator, Electron, Foolkiller, Giant-Man, Green Goblin, Hydra, Jack O'Lantern, Korath the Pursuer, Marauders, Master Pandemonium, Needle, Pip the Troll, Raza Longknife, Snowbird, Toad, Wyatt Wingfoot; Team Action Sheet: X-Men (Fifth Line-Up) | February 1993 |
| 28 | Model sheets: Aron the Rogue Watcher, Black Crow, Blade, Changeling, Cutthroat, Domino, Dream Queen, Elysius, Galactus, Hellfire Club, Kaluu, Living Lightning, Man-Beast, Meggan, Possessor, Ramrod, Scarecrow, Squadron Supreme, Starhawk, Terror Inc., Valinor, Warstar; Team Action Sheet: X-Men (Sixth Line-Up) | March 1993 |
| 29 | Model sheets: Aurora, Balder the Brave, Blackout, Carnage, Black Tom Cassidy, Chief Examiner, Dazzler, Dredmund the Druid, Gardener, Justin Hammer, Lightmaster, Mastermind, Mentallo, Occulus, Puma, Reavers, Sabretooth, Sersi, Solo, Talon, U.S. Agent, Warwolves; Team Action Sheet: X-Men (Seventh Line-Up) | April 1993 |
| 30 | Model sheets: Answer, Bishop, Blackout, Chord, Crusader, Dracula, Dreadnought, Griffin, Hera, Impala, Janus, Longshot, Magik, Nobilus, Portal, Rage, Shalla-Bal, Skrulls, Snowblind, Union Jack, Yandroth, Wraith; Team Action Sheet: X-Men (Eighth Line-Up: Blue Team) | May 1993 |
| 31 | Model sheets: Agamemnon, Blue Eagle, Cardiac, Coldblood, Destroyer, Feral, Gronk, Hussar, Killraven, Living Monolith, Mandrill, Micromax, Molecule Man, Nebula, Presence, Quill, Shockwave, Sleepwalker, Talisman, Vision, War Machine, Wildheart; Team Action Sheet: X-Men (Eighth Line-Up: Gold Team) | June 1993 |
| 32 | Model sheets: Analyzer, Bird-Man, Captain Universe, Doughboy, Enclave, Famine, Growing Man, Harriers, Ion, Kree, Lord Chaos, Maverick, Mephisto, Nefarius, Paibok, Rampage, Señor Muerte, Shapeshifter, Trapster, Union Jack, Voice, Ymir; Team Action Sheet: Avengers West Coast (First Line-Up) | July 1993 |
| 33 | Model sheets: Avalanche, Black Archer, Centurious, Crippler, Deathwatch, Enforcers, Feron, Gideon, Hercules, Human Torch, Inertia, Iron Man, Karma, Living Tribunal, Morg, Rancor, Reptyl, Scourge of the Underworld, Slapstick, Spider-Man 2099, Tyler Stone, Warpath; Team Action Sheet: Avengers West Coast (Second Line-Up) | August 1993 |
| 34 | Model sheets: Aragorn, Blackheart, Caliban, Captain Marvel, Cyber, Demogoblin, Frank Drake, 8-Ball, Frog-Man, Grizzly, Jack of Hearts, Lilith, Multiple Man, Null the Living Darkness, Omega Red, Punisher 2099, Hank Pym, Replica, Rictor, Sunfire, Tigra, Wonder Man; Team Action Sheet: Avengers West Coast (Third Line-Up) | September 1993 |
| 35 | Model sheets: Beyonder, Bloodaxe, Crystal, Deathlok, Doctor Strange, Doom 2099, Fearmaster, Hellstorm, Kala, Lyja, Magus, Polaris, Proteus, Tamara Rahn, Shotgun, Specialist, Spirit of Vengeance, Starhawk, Thunderstrike, Turbo, Weapon X, Zero; Team Action Sheet: Avengers West Coast (Fourth Line-Up) | October 1993 |
| 36 | Model sheets: Ajax, Binary, Blackwing, Cerise, Chance, Evilhawk, Goddess, Grizzly, Hardcore, Moonhunter, Morbius, Ms. Marvel, Proctor, Pyro, Ravage 2099, Roma, Savage Steel, Siege, Sunspot, Ultimo, Vanisher, White Queen, Zarathos | November 1993 |

Reprint Essential OHOTMU - Master Edition (trade paperback, B/W) #1 - 3 (Marvel Comics, April - September 2008)
| # | Info | ISBN | Month of publ. |
|---|---|---|---|
| 1 | Abomination to Gargoyle | ISBN 0-7851-2730-5 | April 2008 |
| 2 | Garokk to Proctor | ISBN 0-7851-2731-3 | June 2008 |
| 3 | Professor Power to Zzzax | ISBN 0-7851-2732-1 | September 2008 |

=== The Official Handbook of the Marvel Universe Vol. IV ===
Original Series (Marvel Comics, May 2004 - May 2021)
| Series | # | Title / Info | Month of publ. |
|---|---|---|---|
| 2004; One-shots | | X-Men 2004 | May 2004 |
| 2004; One-shots | | Spider-Man 2004 | June 2004 |
| 2004; One-shots | | Avengers 2004 | July 2004 |
| 2004; One-shots | | Hulk 2004 | August 2004 |
| 2004; One-shots | | Daredevil 2004 | September 2004 |
| 2004; One-shots | | Wolverine 2004 | October 2004 |
| 2004; One-shots | | Book of the Dead 2004 | November 2004 |
| 2004; One-shots | | Golden Age 2004 | December 2004 |
| 2005; One-shots | | Women of Marvel 2005 | January 2005 |
| 2005; One-shots | | Marvel Knights 2005 | February 2005 |
| 2005; One-shots | | X-Men - Age of Apocalypse 2005 | March 2005 |
| 2005; One-shots | | Spider-Man 2005 | April 2005 |
| 2005; One-shots | | Teams 2005 | May 2005 |
| 2005; One-shots | | Fantastic Four 2005 | June 2005 |
| 2005; One-shots | | Avengers 2005 | July 2005 |
| 2005; One-shots | | Ultimate Spider-Man & Ultimate Fantastic Four 2005 | August 2005 |
| 2005; One-shots | | Alternate Universes 2005 | September 2005 |
| 2005; One-shots | | Horror 2005 | October 2005 |
| 2005; One-shots | | X-Men 2005 | November 2005 |
| 2005; One-shots | | The Ultimates & Ultimate X-Men 2005 | December 2005 |
| 2006; All-New A - Z | 1 | Abraxas to Batwing | January 2006 |
| 2006; All-New A - Z | 2 | Benny Beckley to Crazy Eight | February 2006 |
| 2006; All-New A - Z | 3 | Copperhead to Ethan Edwards | March 2006 |
| 2006; All-New A - Z | 4 | Damon Dran to Goodman, Lieber, Kurtzberg & Holliway | April 2006 |
| 2006; All-New A - Z | 5 | Gorgon to Jury | May 2006 |
| 2006; All-New A - Z | 6 | Justice to Marvel | June 2006 |
| 2006; All-New A - Z | 7 | Victor Mancha to Phantazia | July 2006 |
| 2006; All-New A - Z | 8 | Nekra to Quoi | August 2006 |
| 2006; All-New A - Z | 9 | Puppet Master to Shamrock | September 2006 |
| 2006; All-New A - Z | 10 | Shadowoman to Tara | October 2006 |
| 2006; All-New A - Z | 11 | Stranger to Ultimo | November 2006 |
| 2006; All-New A - Z | 12 | Ultra Girl to Arnim Zola | December 2006 |
| 2006; One-shots | | X-Men: The 198 Files | January 2006 |
| 2006; One-shots | | Marvel Westerns: Outlaw Files | June 2006 |
| 2006; One-shots | | Planet Hulk: Gladiator Guidebook | July 2006 |
| 2006; One-shots | | Annihilation: Nova Corps Files | July 2006 |
| 2006; One-shots | | Civil War Files | September 2006 |
| 2006; Marvel Legacy | | The 1960s Handbook: Acrobat to Zota | February 2006 |
| 2006; Marvel Legacy | | The 1970s Handbook: Avengers to Xorr the God-Jewel | May 2006 |
| 2006; Marvel Legacy | | The 1980s Handbook: Archer, U.S. to Zxaxz | November 2006 |
| 2006; Marvel Legacy | | The 1990s Handbook: Annex to X-Treme | February 2007 |
| 2007; All-New A - Z Update | 1 | Amatsu-Kami to Walker | January 2007 |
| 2007; All-New A - Z Update | 2 | Adam II to Zodiak | May 2007 |
| 2007; All-New A - Z Update | 3 | Acts of Vengeance to Zodiac Key | July 2007 |
| 2007; All-New A - Z Update | 4 | Aqueduct to Zaran | October 2007 |
| 2007; One-shots | | Spider-Man: Back in Black Handbook | April 2007 |
| 2007; One-shots | | Anita Blake: Vampire Hunter - Guilty Pleasures Handbook | May 2007 |
| 2007; One-shots | | Mystic Arcana: The Book of Marvel Magic | June 2007 |
| 2007; One-shots | | The Mighty Avengers: Most Wanted Files | July 2007 |
| 2007; One-shots | | World War Hulk: Gamma Files | August 2007 |
| 2007; One-shots | | Marvel Zombies: The Book of Angels, Demons, & Various Monstrosities | September 2007 |
| 2007; One-shots | | Marvel Atlas #1 | November 2007 |
| 2007; One-shots | | X-Men: Messiah Complex - Mutant Files | December 2007 |
| 2008; One-shots | | Ultimate Secrets | January 2008 |
| 2008; One-shots | | Marvel Atlas #2 | March 2008 |
| 2008; One-shots | | All-New Iron Manual | May 2008 |
| 2008; One-shots | | Secret Invasion: Skrulls! | July 2008 |
| 2008; One-shots | | Amazing Spider-Man: Brand New Day Yearbook | December 2008 |
| 2009; One-shots | | Dark Reign Files | February 2009 |
| 2009; One-shots | | Wolverine: Weapon X Files | April 2009 |
| 2009; One-shots | | Marvel Pets Handbook | June 2009 |
| 2009; One-shots | | Thor & Hercules: Encyclopaedia Mythologica | July 2009 |
| 2009; One-shots | | Marvel Mystery Handbook: 70th Anniversary Special | September 2009 |
| 2010; A - Z Update | 1 | Marlene Alraune to Zuri | February 2010 |
| 2010; A - Z Update | 2 | Abyss (Sorcerer) to Xartans | June 2010 |
| 2010; A - Z Update | 3 | Aakon to Yondu | August 2010 |
| 2010; A - Z Update | 4 | Beetle to Zodiac | October 2010 |
| 2010; A - Z Update | 5 | Advisor to Witness | December 2010 |
| 2010; One-shots | | Deadpool Corps: Rank and Foul | March 2010 |
| 2010; One-shots | | Iron Manual Mark 3 | April 2010 |
| 2010; One-shots | | Avengers Assemble | May 2010 |
| 2010; One-shots | | X-Men: Phoenix Force Handbook | July 2010 |
| 2011; One-shots | | Blockbusters of the Marvel Universe | January 2011 |
| 2011; One-shots | | Thor: Asgard's Avenger | April 2011 |
| 2011; One-shots | | X-Men: Earth's Mutant Heroes | May 2011 |
| 2011; One-shots | | Captain America: America's Avenger | June 2011 |
| 2011; One-shots | | Fear Itself: Fellowship of Fear | August 2011 |
| 2011; One-shots | | FF: 50 Fantastic Years | September 2011 |
| 2011; One-shots | | Vampires: The Marvel Undead | October 2011 |
| 2011; One-shots | | Defenders: Strange Heroes | December 2011 |
| 2012; One-shots | | Avengers: Roll Call | April 2012 |
| 2014; One-shots | | Avengers Now! Handbook | December 2014 |
| 2015; One-shots | | Secret Wars: Official Guide to the Marvel Multiverse | December 2015 |
| 2016; One-shots | | All-New, All-Different Marvel Universe | May 2016 |
| 2018; One-shots | | Spider-Geddon Handbook | December 2018 |
| 2020; One-shots | | Empyre Handbook | August 2020 |
| 2020; One-shots | | X of Swords Handbook | October 2020 |
| 2021; One-shots | | King in Black Handbook | May 2021 |

Reprints (Marvel Comics, November 2007 - June 2012)
| Series | # | Title / Info | ISBN | Month of publ. |
|---|---|---|---|---|
| 2007 (trade paperback) | | Marvel Legacy: The 1960s-1990s Handbook | ISBN 0-7851-2082-3 | November 2007 |
| 2007 (hardcover) | | Mystic Arcana * | ISBN 0-7851-2719-4 | December 2007 |
| 2008 (trade paperback) | | Mystic Arcana * * contains the four-part comic miniseries Mystic Arcana, The Official Tarot of the Marvel Universe and The Official Handbook of the Marvel Universe: Mystic Arcana | ISBN 0-7851-2720-8 | June 2008 |
| 2008 (trade paperback) | | Marvel Atlas | ISBN 0-7851-2998-7 | July 2008 |
| 2008; A - Z (hardcover) | 1 | 1602 A.D. to Blackwing (Manfredi) | ISBN 0-7851-3028-4 | February 2008 |
| 2008; A - Z (hardcover) | 2 | Blackwulf to Crimson Dynamo | ISBN 0-7851-3099-3 | April 2008 |
| 2008; A - Z (hardcover) | 3 | Crimson Dynamo (Gavrilov) to Elements of Doom | ISBN 0-7851-3100-0 | June 2008 |
| 2008; A - Z (hardcover) | 4 | Elf with a Gun to Guardians of the Galaxy | ISBN 0-7851-3101-9 | August 2008 |
| 2008; A - Z (hardcover) | 5 | Guardsmen to Jackal | ISBN 0-7851-3102-7 | October 2008 |
| 2008; A - Z (hardcover) | 6 | Harald Jaekelsson to Maelstrom | ISBN 0-7851-3103-5 | December 2008 |
| 2008; A - Z (hardcover) | 7 | Maestro to Ms. Marvel | ISBN 0-7851-3104-3 | March 2009 |
| 2008; A - Z (hardcover) | 8 | Multiple Man to Phoenix Force | ISBN 0-7851-3105-1 | May 2009 |
| 2008; A - Z (hardcover) | 9 | Photon to Sage | ISBN 0-7851-3106-X | July 2009 |
| 2008; A - Z (hardcover) | 10 | Salem's Seven to Speed | ISBN 0-7851-3107-8 | September 2009 |
| 2008; A - Z (hardcover) | 11 | Speed Demon to Terrible Trio | ISBN 0-7851-3108-6 | November 2009 |
| 2008; A - Z (hardcover) | 12 | Terror (Pevely) to Vision (Aarkus) | ISBN 0-7851-3109-4 | January 2010 |
| 2008; A - Z (hardcover) | 13 | Vision (Victor Shade) to Zaran | ISBN 0-7851-4178-2 | April 2010 |
| 2008; A - Z (hardcover) | 14 | Zarathos to Zzzax; Aboriginal Gods to Yandroth | ISBN 0-7851-4179-0 | June 2010 |
| 2008; A - Z (hardcover) | contains material from 2004 - 2009, plus updates and several all-new entries | | | |
| 2009 (trade paperback) | | Wolverine: Weapon X Files contains Wolverine: Weapon X Files (2009), Wolverine Encyclopedia (1996) # 1 - 2 [sic!] and the Beast Files (from Marvel Vision # 5 - 30) | ISBN 0-7851-4240-1 | September 2009 |
| 2010 (trade paperback) | | Women of Marvel: Celebrating Seven Decades | ISBN 0-7851-4912-0 | July 2010 |
| 2011; A - Z (trade paperback) | 1 | 1602 to Blackwulf | ISBN 0-7851-5803-0 | September 2011 |
| 2011; A - Z (trade paperback) | 2 | Blade to Crooked World | ISBN 0-7851-5831-6 | December 2011 |
| 2011; A - Z (trade paperback) | 3 | Crimson Dynamo to Elements of Doom | ISBN 0-7851-5832-4 | February 2012 |
| 2011; A - Z (trade paperback) | 4 | Elf with a Gun to Guardians of the Galaxy | ISBN 0-7851-5833-2 | April 2012 |
| 2011; A - Z (trade paperback) | 5 | Guardsmen to Jackal | ISBN 0-7851-5834-0 | June 2012 |
| 2011; A - Z (trade paperback) | 6 | | ISBN 0-7851-5835-9 | Publication cancelled |
| 2011; A - Z (trade paperback) | contains material from 2008's A - Z (hardcover) with corrections, plus 16-page addendums entitled "Where are they now?" | | | |

== Bibliography of other handbook titles ==
=== Marvel Encyclopedias ===
Wolverine Encyclopedia (trade paperback) #1 - 2 (November - December 1996)
| # | Info | ISBN | Month of publ. |
|---|---|---|---|
| 1 | A - K | ISBN 0-7851-0296-5 | November 1996 |
| 2 | L - R | ISBN 0-7851-0296-5 | December 1996 |
| 3 | S - Z | - | Publication cancelled |
| | Wolverine: Weapon X Files includes reprints of Wolverine Encyclopedia # 1 - 2 | ISBN 0-7851-4240-1 | September 2009 |

Marvel Encyclopedia (hardcover) #1 - 6 (October 2002 - November 2004)
| # | Info | ISBN | Month of publ. |
|---|---|---|---|
| 1 | Avengers, Fantastic Four, Marvel Knights / MAX, X-Men | ISBN 0-7851-0984-6 | October 2002 |
| 2 | X-Men | ISBN 0-7851-1199-9 | April 2003 |
| 3 | Hulk | ISBN 0-7851-1164-6 | June 2003 |
| 4 | Spider-Man | ISBN 0-7851-1304-5 | November 2003 |
| 5 | Marvel Knights | ISBN 0-7851-1385-1 | April 2004 |
| 6 | Fantastic Four | ISBN 0-7851-1480-7 | November 2004 |

Marvel Encyclopedia (trade paperback) (Scholastic, 2006 - 2008)
| # | Info | ISBN | Month of publ. |
|---|---|---|---|
| ? | X-Men | ? | 2006 |
| ? | Spider-Man | ISBN 0-7851-2428-4 | 2006 |
| ? | Avengers | ISBN 0-7851-3039-X | Januar 2008 |

The Marvel Encyclopedia (hardcover) (Dorling Kindersley, October 2006 - March 2014)
| Title | ISBN | Month of publ. |
|---|---|---|
| The Marvel Encyclopedia - 1st Edition | ISBN 0-7566-2358-8 | October 2006 |
| The Marvel Encyclopedia - Limited 1st Edition | ISBN 0-7566-2472-X | October 2006 |
| The Marvel Encyclopedia - 2nd Edition | ISBN 0-7566-5530-7 | October 2009 |
| The Marvel Encyclopedia - Limited 2nd Edition | ISBN 0-7566-5725-3 | October 2009 |
| The Marvel Encyclopedia - 3rd Edition | ISBN 1-4654-1593-9 | March 2014 |
| The Marvel Encyclopedia - 4th Edition | ISBN 1-4654-7890-6, 978-1-4654-7890-0 | April 2019 |
| The Marvel Encyclopedia - 5th Edition | ISBN 0-5938-4611-7, 978-0-5938-4611-7 | October 2024 |

Spider-Man Character Encyclopedia (hardcover) (Dorling Kindersley, April 2014)
| Title | ISBN | Month of publ. |
|---|---|---|
| Spider-Man Character Encyclopedia | ISBN 1-4093-4755-9 | April 2014 |

The Avengers Encyclopedia (hardcover) (Dorling Kindersley, October 2015)
| Title | ISBN | Month of publ. |
|---|---|---|
| The Avengers Encyclopedia | ISBN 0-2411-8371-5 | October 2015 |

Marvel Studios Character Encyclopedia (hardcover) (Dorling Kindersley), April 2019)
| Title | ISBN | Month of publ. |
|---|---|---|
| Marvel Studios Character Encyclopedia | ISBN 1465478892 | April 2019 |

Ultimate Marvel (hardcover) (Dorling Kindersley), September 2017)
| Title | ISBN | Month of publ. |
|---|---|---|
| Ultimate Marvel | ISBN 1465455728 | September 2017 |

Ultimate Guides (hardcover) (Dorling Kindersley, October 2000 – Present)
| Title | Author | ISBN | Month of publ. |
|---|---|---|---|
| Ultimate X-Men | Peter Sanderson | ISBN 0-7513-2885-5 | October 2000 |
| Spider-Man: The Ultimate Guide | Tom DeFalco | ISBN 0-7513-2017-X | September 2001 |
| X-Men: The Ultimate Guide (Updated) | Peter Sanderson | ISBN 0-7894-9258-X | March 2003 |
| Hulk: The Incredible Guide | Tom DeFalco | ISBN 0-7894-9260-1 | May 2003 |
| The Fantastic Four: The Ultimate Guide | Tom DeFalco | ISBN 1-4053-0996-2 | June 2005 |
| The Avengers: The Ultimate Guide | Tom DeFalco | ISBN 0-7566-1461-9 | October 2005 |
| X-Men: The Ultimate Guide (updated) | Peter Sanderson | ISBN 1-4053-1325-0 | April 2006 |
| Ghost Rider: The Visual Guide | Andrew Darling | ISBN 978-0756621483 | December 2006 |
| Hulk: The Incredible Guide (updated) | Tom DeFalco | ISBN 1405333308 | June 2008 |
| Spider-Man: The Ultimate Guide (updated) | Tom DeFalco | ISBN 0-7566-2675-7 | March 2007 |
| Wolverine: Inside the World of the Living Weapon | Matthew K. Manning | ISBN 0-7566-4547-6 | March 2009 |
| Iron Man: The Ultimate Guide to the Armored Super Hero | Matthew K. Manning | ISBN 0-7566-5749-0 | February 2010 |
| The Avengers: The Ultimate Character Guide | Alan Cowsill | ISBN 0-7566-6740-2 | September 2010 |
| The Avengers: The Ultimate Guide to Earth's Mightiest Heroes! | Scott Beatty | ISBN 0-7566-9025-0 | April 2012 |
| The Avengers: The Ultimate Character Guide (updated) | Alan Cowsill | ISBN 1-4093-4245-X | 2013 |
| X-Men: The Ultimate Guide (updated) | ? | ISBN 0-2410-1755-6 | 2014 |
| The Avengers: The Ultimate Character Guide (updated) | ? | ISBN 0-2410-0761-5 | March 2015 |
| Captain America: The Ultimate Guide to the First Avenger | ? | ISBN 1465448845 | April 2016 |
| Guardians of the Galaxy: The Ultimate Guide to the Cosmic Outlaws | ? | ISBN 1465458999 | April 2017 |
| Black Panther: The Ultimate Guide | ? | ISBN 1465466266 | January 2018 |
| Marvel Studios Visual Dictionary | ? | ISBN 1465476377 | September 2018 |
| Black Widow: Secrets of a Super-Spy | Melanie Scott | ISBN 1465496920 | April 2020 |

=== Marvel Fact Files ===
Marvel Fact Files are a series of encyclopedic guides which detail the fictional universe featured in Marvel Comics publications. The magazine series is published in the U.K. by Eaglemoss Publications, starting in 2013.

== Reception ==
Lawrence Henry Apodaca reviewed the original The Official Handbook of the Marvel Universe in Space Gamer No. 64. Apodaca commented that "Non-comic collectors should be able to find copies at stores which carry back issues - and should look for them. They are a valuable aid to science fiction or superhero RPGs."

== See also ==
- The Classic Marvel Figurine Collection
- List of Marvel Comics characters
- List of Marvel Comics teams and organizations
- List of Marvel Comics publications
- Official Marvel Index
- Who's Who in the DC Universe
