= Sharon Blynn =

American actress

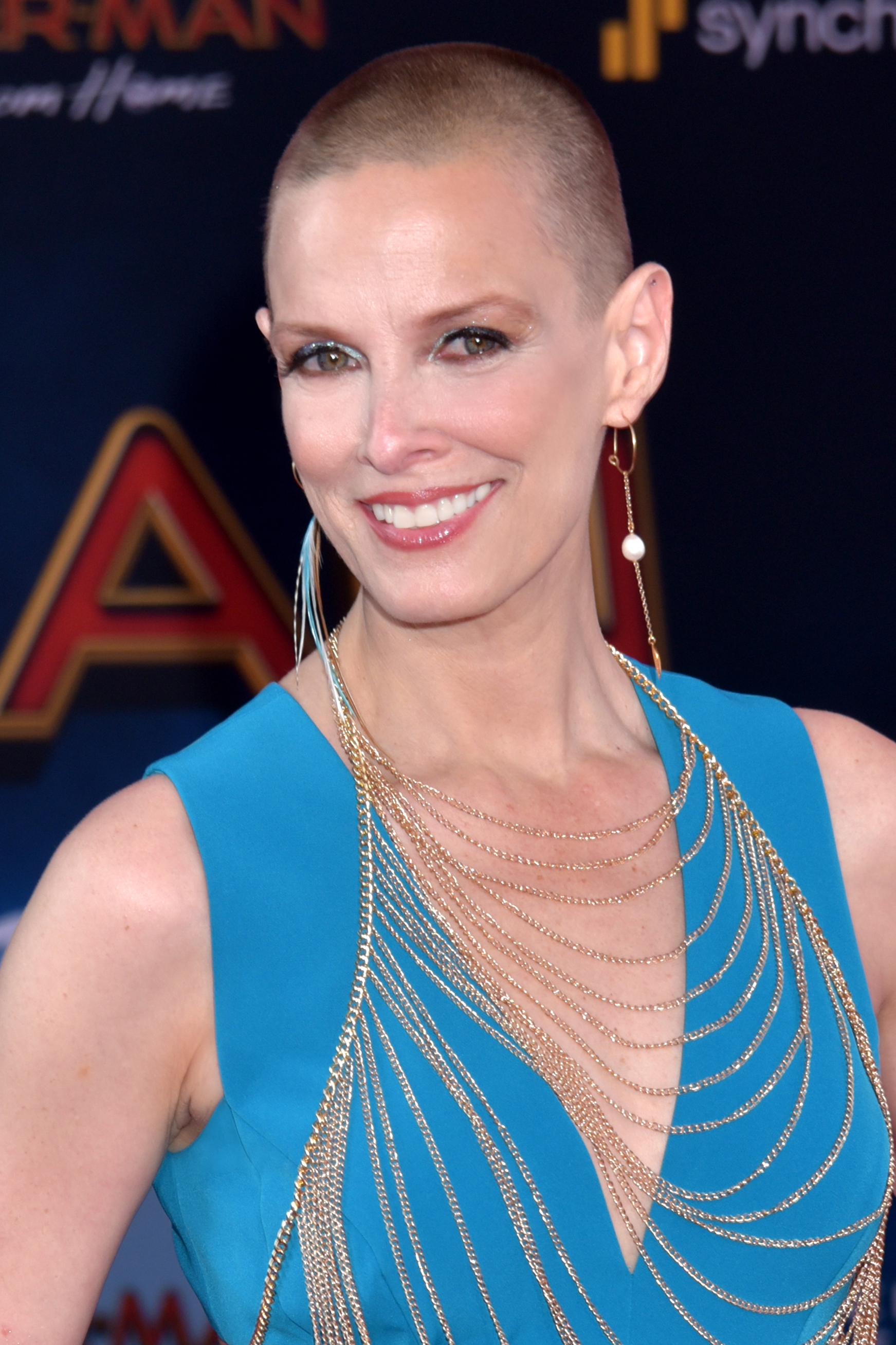
- Blynn in 2019
- Born: Sharon Blynn
- Occupations: Activist, Actress, Model
- Years active: 2002–present

Sharon Blynn is an American actress and cancer activist.

Blynn is known for portraying the character Soren, a Skrull, in the 2019 superhero films Captain Marvel and Spider-Man: Far From Home.

== Early life ==
Blynn grew up in Miami, and moved to New York City to attend college at Barnard College/Columbia University, graduating from Columbia University with the first-ever undergraduate B.A. in Ethnomusicology. After graduation, she worked as a marketing executive for Verve Records from 1994 to 2000.

== Cancer activism ==
In 2000 she was diagnosed with ovarian cancer. After three years of treatment, Sharon has been in remission since 2003. Inspired by her own life and experience with ovarian cancer, Sharon founded an organisation called "Bald is Beautiful" in 2002. The main objective of the movement is to expand the existing social notions of beauty and femininity, and also ovarian cancer awareness programs. Sharon has remained bald since 2001 in order to publicly represent the message of her organization, and work within TV and film to put the image of a bald woman into mainstream consciousness and give women positive media references for how their bodies may change during treatment (and as women in general).

For the past 17 years, Sharon has been working as a cancer activist. In November 2009, she spoke at the "Lo Que de Verdad Importa (What Really Matters)" program presented by the Madrid-based Además Organization. She was the host and interviewee for "The Whisper", a documentary about ovarian cancer which was aired on PBS in September 2010.

== Acting career ==
In film, Blynn is notable for her involvement in the 2019 Marvel Cinematic Universe films Captain Marvel and Spider-Man: Far From Home, where she portrayed Soren, a Skrull who is Talos' wife.

== Filmography ==
Film
Year	Title	Role	Notes
2005	Last Time I said Goodbye		Short
2008	Secrets	The Woman	Short
2019	Captain Marvel	Soren	
2019	Spider-Man: Far From Home	Soren	Uncredited cameo; post-credits scene

Television
Year	Title	Role	Notes
2010	Lie To Me	MRI Tech	Episode: 2.14
2011	Shameless	Bald Woman	Episode: 1.5
2011	Body of Proof	Cynthia Marks	Episode: 2.9
2017	The Detour	Jayden	Episode: 2.7
