= Talos the Untamed =

Fictional character in Marvel Comics

Talos
- Talos as seen in the interior panel of Incredible Hulk #419; Art by Roger Cruz

Publication information
- Publisher: Marvel Comics
- First appearance: The Incredible Hulk vol. 1 #418 (June 1994)
- Created by: Peter David (writer); Gary Frank (artist)

In-story information
- Species: Skrull
- Place of origin: Tarnax IV
- Team affiliations: United Front
- Notable aliases: Talos the Untamed; Talos the Tamed; Jonathan Richards
- Abilities: Super-strength; Enhanced durability

Talos the Untamed is a fictional character appearing in American comic books published by Marvel Comics. Created by writer Peter David and artist Gary Frank, the character debuted in The Incredible Hulk #418 (June 1994). The character is a well-known Skrull due to not being able to shapeshift. He was a member of the United Front.

Ben Mendelsohn portrayed Talos in the Marvel Cinematic Universe films Captain Marvel (2019) and Spider-Man: Far From Home (2019), and in the Disney+ miniseries Secret Invasion (2023).

== Publication history ==
The character was created by Peter David and Gary Frank and first appeared in The Incredible Hulk vol. 2 #418 (June 1994). He was introduced as a guest at Rick Jones's wedding, where he and other villains were invited by Impossible Man as a prank. In the following issue, it is revealed he cannot shapeshift and that he was captured by the Kree in the Kree–Skrull War.

He returned during the Annihilation event, mainly in the four issue tie-in Annihilation: Ronan (2006). He joined the United Front, alongside characters like Star-Lord, Nova and Gamora.

He made his last appearances in the 2015 ongoing of Howard the Duck, where he infiltrated Earth with a physical human disguise under the alias Jonathan Richards.

== Fictional character biography ==
Talos, considered a mutant by his people, is a Skrull born unable to shapeshift. He makes up for it with brute strength, earning the title "Talos the Untamed" due to his savage and sinister nature. After the Kree captured him, Talos refuses to commit suicide in the hopes of gaining glory for his survival. Instead, he was ridiculed and renamed the more humiliating "Talos the Tamed".

Talos attends the wedding ceremony of Rick Jones and Marlo Chandler, invited by the Impossible Man. He attacks the Hulk in an attempt to die in battle and thus reclaim his honor. When Talos does not honor the Hulk's refusal to participate, the Hulk begs Talos for mercy. Talos realizes that the Hulk is feigning, but regards even pretending to beg for mercy as a disgrace making the Hulk unworthy to fight him, and leaves in frustration.

Talos is called to the planet Godthab Omega by Glorian, where he battles Devos the Devastator. They are both captured and imprisoned when the Annihilation Wave attacks, allowing the two to escape. Talos later joins the United Front to fight the Annihilation Wave.

Talos approaches Howard the Duck under the alias of Jonathan Richards and manipulates him into retrieving the Abundant Gems, less powerful versions of the Infinity Gems. He is defeated by Howard and his friend Tara Tam and apprehended by the Fantastic Four.

== Powers and abilities ==
Unlike his Skrull brethren, Talos is incapable of shapeshifting and has been branded as having a genetic defect by his people. To make up for this, he has been granted superhuman strength and durability and can hold his own against the likes of the Hulk. He possesses a cybernetic eye after losing his biological eye in combat.

== In other media ==
=== Marvel Cinematic Universe ===
Talos appears in media set in the Marvel Cinematic Universe (MCU), portrayed by Ben Mendelsohn. This version is able to shapeshift, has a wife named Soren and a daughter named G'iah, and is the leader of a faction of Skrull refugees attempting to escape a genocidal war waged by the Kree.

- Talos first appears in the film Captain Marvel (2019). While seeking refuge from the Kree, Talos and his people received unexpected aid from renegade Kree scientist Mar-Vell, who rejected her species' war with the Skrulls and fled to Earth. Mar-Vell sheltered Talos and his family while working on a Tesseract-powered engine that would have allowed the Skrulls to settle beyond the Kree Empire's reach but the Kree eventually found and killed Mar-Vell. In 1995, Talos continues to lead the Skrulls in their fight with the Kree, during which they capture Carol Danvers. Using a mind-probing machine, Talos and the Skrulls discover that Danvers knew Mar-Vell, but before they can learn more, Danvers breaks free and escapes to Earth. Talos and a small group of Skrulls pursue Danvers and take on human disguises, with Talos assuming the role of S.H.I.E.L.D. director Keller. They eventually find Danvers and Talos arranges a parley to reveal to Danvers and S.H.I.E.L.D. agent Nick Fury the truth of the Kree–Skrull War. Sympathizing with his cause, Danvers leaves Earth to help the Skrulls find a new home.
- In the film Spider-Man: Far From Home (2019), Talos and Soren pose as Fury (portrayed by Samuel L. Jackson) and Maria Hill respectively to give Peter Parker an important device and recruit to fight the Elementals.
- In the television series Secret Invasion (2023), Talos and Fury combat a rogue Skrull group led by Gravik who plots to orchestrate a nuclear war amongst humanity and manipulated G'iah into joining his side, until Talos is killed by Gravik.

=== Video games ===
Talos appears as a playable character in Marvel Puzzle Quest as part of the Captain Marvel film tie-in update.
