= Kamar-Taj =

Fictional location in the Marvel Comics universe

- Kamar-Taj. Script by Denny O'Neil, art by Bill Everett.
- First appearance: Strange Tales #110 (Jul 1963)

In-universe information
- Type: Sanctuary
- Character: Ancient One
- Publisher: Marvel Comics
- Creators: Stan Lee; Steve Ditko

Kamar-Taj is a fictional location appearing in American comic books published by Marvel Comics. It first appeared in Strange Tales #110 (July 1963) and was created by Stan Lee and Steve Ditko. The name "Kamar-Taj" does not appear in early Lee/Ditko Doctor Strange stories, but was created later as the location's backstory was fleshed out.

== Description ==
In Marvel Comics, Kamar-Taj is "a hidden land high in the Himalayas" and the homeland of Doctor Strange's mentor, the Ancient One, and of the evil sorcerer Kaluu. Strange's majordomo Wong also stems from a family of monks living in Kamar-Taj.

Over 500 years ago, the man who would one day become the Ancient One was born in Kamar-Taj. With his friend Kaluu, he discovered the power of magic but the two friends disagreed on how to use it to protect their village. Kaluu sought to conquer neighboring villages and build a large empire. The two cast a spell eliminating sickness, disease, and age from Kamar-Taj and shortly afterward Kaluu was crowned king by the villagers under Kaluu's mind-control spell. The Ancient One tried to stop Kaluu and in their battle, the village of Kamar-Taj was wiped out. Kaluu was banished to an alternate dimension. The Ancient One left Kamar-Taj and traveled the Earth for centuries, battling evil creatures, gaining the Amulet of Agamotto and the Book of the Vishanti.

He finally settled down in the Himalayan Mountains near Kamar-Taj, building a palace as his home with an order of monks to protect and assist him. In a tournament organized by the sorcerer Aged Genghis, the Ancient One won the title of Earth's Sorcerer Supreme. He took a student, who would one day become Mister Jip, but banned him from his home when he found out the student had been studying the forbidden books to increase his own power.

Feeling himself getting older and weaker, the Ancient One set out to find a student. He taught such beings as Doctor Druid and Baron Mordo but found his true apprentice in Stephen Strange, claiming that this boy would become the new Sorcerer Supreme. Mordo began to plot against Strange, though the Ancient One kept protecting him. Mordo soon left the palace and Stephen became the Ancient One's successor. The Ancient One would often assist Stephen, until Shuma-Gorath killed the Ancient One's physical body.

== In other media ==
In the Marvel Cinematic Universe, Kamar-Taj appears in live-action films Doctor Strange (2016) and Doctor Strange in the Multiverse of Madness (2022).

== See also ==
- Shangri-La
