= Devos the Devastator =

Marvel Comics fictional character

Publication information
- Publisher: Marvel Comics
- First appearance: Fantastic Four #359 (December, 1991)
- Created by: Tom DeFalco; Paul Ryan; Danny Bulanadi

In-story information
- Alter ego: Devos
- Species: Alien Cyborg
- Team affiliations: Fearsome Foursome
- Abilities: Cybernetic implants; Powered armor grants: Superhuman strength; Damage resistance; Flight; Various weapons and sensors

Devos the Devastator is a supervillain appearing in American comic books published by Marvel Comics. He is a foe of the Fantastic Four. His first appearance was in Fantastic Four #359 (December, 1991); he was created by Tom DeFalco, Paul Ryan and Danny Bulanadi.

== Fictional character biography ==
Devos is an extraterrestrial vigilante dedicated to bringing peace to the universe, but holds the warped view that this can only be done by destroying anyone whom he deems a threat to galactic peace—therefore, killing everyone capable of waging war. While Devos is willing to make alliances with other villains to further his goals, he inevitably betrays his allies, as they too are capable of waging war. Devos is known for destroying the Skrull Throneworld, throwing the Skrull empire into civil war.

Devos appears in the Annihilation storyline, where he is attacked by Talos the Untamed and later captured by Glorian. When Godthab Omega is overrun by the Annihilation Wave, Glorian releases Devos and Talos and tells them to escape.

== Powers, abilities, and equipment ==
Devos wears an armored battlesuit that granted him tremendous strength and physical resistance. The suit is equipped with an energy blaster with automated targeting devices mounted on his right shoulder. It can fire projectiles with bazooka force from either shoulder, as well as poison gases or frost grenades via left wrist device and emit powerful electric shocks inside the outer surface of his armor. His helmet is also equipped with sophisticated internal sensor systems, designed to allow him see into otherwise invisible portions of the spectrum. It contains a "Luminator", which produces blinding lights. The anti-gravity generators in his exoskeleton enables him to fly at subsonic speeds.

=== The Arsenal Planet ===
Devos has access to numerous space vessels, advanced weaponry, and robotic servants, including Sedators (warrior robots), Servo-bots (robots capable of performing maintenance work aboard Devos's starship), and Bouncer-Bots (large humanoid units built to handle and capture specimens for study).

== In other media ==
Devos the Devastator appears in the Moon Girl and Devil Dinosaur episode "The Borough Bully", voiced by Fred Tatasciore. This version speaks in an illeism.
