= Zota =

Publication information
- Publisher: Marvel Comics
- First appearance: Strange Tales #124 (1964)
- Created by: Stan Lee (writer); Steve Ditko (artist)

In-story information
- Full name: Zota of Pergamum
- Abilities: Sorcery, force-field generation, energy projection, hypnosis induction, time-manipulating, teleportation

Zota of Pergamum, usually referred to as Zota, is a super villain appearing in American comic books published by Marvel Comics. The character, predominantly a foe of Doctor Strange, was created by writer-plotter Stan Lee and artist Steve Ditko. He made his first appearance in Strange Tales #124 (September 1964).

== Fictional character biography ==
=== 1960s ===
Zota of Pergamum possessed vast knowledge of the mystic arts, which he exploited to cast Cleopatra into a deep trance in 47 BCE, as well as send her to 20th-century New York City. He did so as a form of retaliation against Cleopatra for rejecting his love towards her. Doctor Strange discovers Cleopatra and, with the assistance of the Ancient One, travels back in time to end Zota's diabolical ways.

Having had a premonition of Strange's coming, Zota quickly generates a force-field out of light, which entraps Strange. Strange hits back by conjuring a billow of smoke, destroying the light prison. After a long showdown leaves Zota exhausted, Strange uses a mystical amulet to hypnotize Zota, forcing him to reveal how to reverse the spell he placed on Cleopatra. Strange takes away all knowledge of sorcery from Zota and returns him and Cleopatra to ancient Egypt.

=== 1990s ===
During The Infinity Gauntlet storyline, Thanos sends Doctor Strange and Clea to circa 37 BCE. Their presence is noted by Zota, who at this point in time still has knowledge of magic and is combing the Library of Alexandria for the Scroll of Vishanti. His efforts are to no avail, as the scroll has found Zota unworthy to be its owner.

After being received by Julius Caesar and Cleopatra, Strange and Clea set off to find the Library of Alexandria. Zota captures Clea and places her in a magical mirror, then demands the Scroll of Vishanti in exchange for her life. Strange relents and hurls the scroll to him; however, the scroll electrocutes Zota by instinct. With Zota defeated, Strange and Clea call upon Doctor Druid to send them back to the present.

== Powers and abilities ==
As a powerful practitioner of sorcery, Zota is able to project high levels of energy, including "bolts of negative energy from the netherworld". In addition, he is capable of putting people into a trance-like state.
