= Darkoth =

Publication information
- Publisher: Marvel Comics
- First appearance: Fantastic Four #142 (Jan. 1974)
- Created by: Gerry Conway (writer); Rich Buckler (artist)

In-story information
- Alter ego: Desmond Pitt
- Team affiliations: NASA; United States Air Force
- Notable aliases: Death Demon
- Abilities: Superhuman strength; Flight; Intangibility; Shapeshifting; Energy projection

Darkoth (Desmond Pitt) is a supervillain appearing in American comic books published by Marvel Comics. He first appeared in Fantastic Four #142 (January 1974), and was created by Gerry Conway and Rich Buckler.

== Fictional character biography ==
Desmond Pitt is a former Air Force pilot and friend of Ben Grimm who originates from St. Louis, Missouri. After discovering that agents of Doctor Doom have infiltrated a solar shuttle project he is assigned to, Pitt poses as a willing accomplice to discover the extent of their infiltration into NASA. After Pitt is discovered to be a spy, Doom's operatives have him captured. Doom alters Pitt's body through surgery and mutagenic compounds, transforming him into a demonic form dubbed Darkoth. Doom wipes Pitt's memories and makes him believe that he was born as a demon and rescued from the Netherworld. Darkoth then attacks the Thing, and lures him into the underground fortress of Doctor Doom. However, Darkoth regains his memory and betrays Doom.

Darkoth is later enhanced by Diablo, who recruits him to attack Doom. Darkoth stows away aboard a space shuttle piloted by the Thing. His plan is to redirect the solar generators at Doom. However, Darkoth betrays Diablo when he learns the Thing would also be hurt. Darkoth is apparently killed in a solar generator explosion.

Darkoth is rescued by Mephisto and becomes his pawn. He is killed in a battle with Thor and ends up in the dimension Otherplace. There, he fights Belasco's servant S'ym for possession of the Soulsword. Darkoth kills S'ym and takes control over the Soulsword. He becomes the embodiment of Otherplace, which he transforms into a realm of peace.

In the "King in Black" event, Darkoth bonds with Bedlam and gains the ability to summon Hellnir, a fiery replica of Mjolnir. He battles Thor before being rendered comatose and placed in Asgard's care.

== Powers and abilities ==
Desmond Pitt was transformed into Darkoth through bio-engineering and cybernetic implantation by Doctor Doom. As Darkoth, he possesses superhuman strength, stamina, durability, and agility, and the ability to generate energy blasts from his antennae. He also used poisoned steel talons.

As a result of Diablo's alterations, Darkoth gained the ability to fly, and become intangible. After his resurrection in Otherplace, Darkoth gained the ability to shapeshift.

Pitt is a skilled pilot and had earned a degree in aeronautical engineering. He is an Air Force Academy graduate with extensive piloting experience and military training.
