= Spider-Man: Far From Home =

2019 Marvel Studios film

- Theatrical release poster
- Directed by: Jon Watts
- Written by: Chris McKenna; Erik Sommers
- Based on: Spider-Man by: Stan Lee; Steve Ditko
- Produced by: Kevin Feige; Amy Pascal
- Starring: Tom Holland; Samuel L. Jackson; Zendaya; Cobie Smulders; Jon Favreau; J. B. Smoove; Jacob Batalon; Martin Starr; Tony Revolori; Marisa Tomei; Jake Gyllenhaal
- Cinematography: Matthew J. Lloyd
- Edited by: Dan Lebental; Leigh Folsom Boyd
- Music by: Michael Giacchino
- Production companies: Columbia Pictures; Marvel Studios; Pascal Pictures
- Distributed by: Sony Pictures Releasing
- Release dates: June 26, 2019 (TCL Chinese Theatre); July 2, 2019 (United States)
- Running time: 129 minutes
- Country: United States
- Language: English
- Budget: $160 million
- Box office: $1.133 billion

Spider-Man: Far From Home is a 2019 American superhero film based on the Marvel Comics character Spider-Man. Produced by Columbia Pictures, Marvel Studios, and Pascal Pictures, and distributed by Sony Pictures Releasing, it is the sequel to Spider-Man: Homecoming (2017) and the 23rd film in the Marvel Cinematic Universe (MCU). The film was directed by Jon Watts, written by Chris McKenna and Erik Sommers, and stars Tom Holland as Peter Parker / Spider-Man alongside Samuel L. Jackson, Zendaya, Cobie Smulders, Jon Favreau, J. B. Smoove, Jacob Batalon, Martin Starr, Tony Revolori, Marisa Tomei, and Jake Gyllenhaal. In the film, Peter is recruited by Nick Fury (Jackson) and Mysterio (Gyllenhaal) to help stop the Elementals while he is on a school trip to Europe.

Discussions for a sequel to Spider-Man: Homecoming began by October 2016, and the project was confirmed later that year. Holland, Watts, and the writers were all set to return by the end of 2017. In 2018, Jackson and Gyllenhaal joined the cast as Fury and Mysterio, respectively. Holland revealed the sequel's title ahead of filming, which began that July and took place in England, the Czech Republic, Italy, and the New York metropolitan area. Production wrapped in October 2018. The marketing campaign is one of the most expensive for a film ever and attempted to avoid revealing spoilers for Avengers: Endgame prior to its April 2019 release.

Spider-Man: Far From Home premiered at the TCL Chinese Theatre in Hollywood, Los Angeles, on June 26, 2019, and was theatrically released in the United States on July 2, as both the final film in Phase Three of the MCU and the Infinity Saga. The film received positive reviews with praise for its humor, action sequences, visuals, and the performances of Holland and Gyllenhaal. It grossed $1.133 billion worldwide, making it the first Spider-Man film to pass the billion-dollar mark, the fourth-highest-grossing film of 2019, and became Sony Pictures' highest-grossing film and the 24th-highest-grossing film of all time. A sequel, Spider-Man: No Way Home, was released in December 2021.

== Plot ==
In Ixtenco, Mexico, Nick Fury and Maria Hill investigate an unnatural storm and encounter the Earth Elemental. Quentin Beck, a super-powered individual, arrives and defeats the creature. Fury and Hill subsequently recruit him. In New York City, the Midtown School of Science and Technology completes its year, which was restarted to accommodate the students who disintegrated five years earlier due to Thanos's actions; they had reappeared un-aged, thanks to the actions of the Avengers. (Note: As depicted in Avengers: Infinity War (2018) and Avengers: Endgame (2019)) The school organizes a two-week summer field trip to Europe, where Peter Parker—who is still mourning the death of his mentor Tony Stark—plans to reveal to classmate MJ his attraction to her. Happy Hogan informs Peter that Fury intends to contact him, but Peter ignores Fury's phone call.

Peter and his classmates travel to Venice, Italy, where the Water Elemental attacks. While Peter helps protect his classmates, Beck arrives and defeats the creature. Fury meets with Peter and gives him Stark's eyeglasses. The glasses enable him to communicate with and take command of the artificial intelligence E.D.I.T.H., which has access to Stark Industries' databases and commands a large orbital weapons supply. Beck claims to have entered from an alternate reality within the multiverse, where the four Elementals killed his family and destroyed his civilization. With only the Fire Elemental left to destroy, Beck predicts it will attack Prague, Czech Republic. Peter declines Fury's invitation to join the fight and returns to his class trip, but Fury secretly changes the class's itinerary to divert the students to Prague.

Peter is forced to help Beck fight the Fire Elemental to again protect his friends. Beck manages to destroy the creature with Peter's help. Fury and Hill invite Peter and Beck to Berlin, Germany to discuss forming a new superhero team, but Peter decides that Beck should go alone and transfers control of E.D.I.T.H. to him. Once Peter leaves, Beck celebrates alongside ex-Stark Industries employees, with whom he had been working to masquerade as a superhero. Beck, who was fired from his position as Stark's holographic-illusions specialist due to his unstable nature, uses advanced projectors to simulate his powers and the Elementals. He plans to use E.D.I.T.H.'s orbital weaponized drones to increase the scale of his illusions and fraudulently establish himself as an Avenger-level hero.

After MJ tells Peter she knows he is Spider-Man, they discover that a piece of debris she retrieved during the battle with the Fire Elemental is a projector and the pair realize Beck's deception. Peter travels to Berlin, to warn Fury, but Beck tricks him with an elaborate illusion, forcing him to reveal the names of his friends who know about Beck's plan, and causing Peter to get hit by a train. Beck is unaware that Peter, though injured, has survived. In the Netherlands, Peter contacts Hogan, who flies him to London, England, where his classmates are. Beck uses E.D.I.T.H. to orchestrate a fusion of all the Elementals. He intends to kill Peter's friends during the staged attack, as Beck is concerned that they will expose him with their knowledge. Peter disrupts the illusions and an enraged Beck attacks him with drones. Peter regains control of E.D.I.T.H. and defeats Beck, who is hit by a misfired gunshot from one of the drones. Before he dies, Beck tells his associate William Ginter Riva to retrieve data from the drones. After returning to New York City, Peter begins a relationship with MJ.

In a mid-credits scene, J. Jonah Jameson of TheDailyBugle.net broadcasts doctored footage of the London incident in which Beck frames Spider-Man for the drone attack and his death before exposing Spider-Man's secret identity to the world, much to Peter's shock. In a post-credits scene, Fury and Hill are revealed to be the Skrulls Talos and Soren in disguise, under orders from the real Fury while he is away in space commanding a group of Skrulls.

== Cast ==
- Tom Holland as Peter Parker / Spider-Man:
  A high-school junior and Avenger who received spider-like abilities after being bitten by a radioactive spider. Director Jon Watts said that, in contrast to Spider-Man: Homecoming (2017) in which Peter longs for the responsibilities of an adult, in Far From Home he wants to hang onto his youth, saying, "This film is about the world telling him, 'It's time for you to step up and grow up, kid,' and he's saying, 'But I still want to be a kid and go on vacation.'"
- Samuel L. Jackson as Nick Fury:
  The former director of S.H.I.E.L.D., who is now in a situation where he does not have the level of control he is used to having. Watts describes Fury's relationship with Peter as "the mean new stepdad", contrasting his role with Tony Stark as a "supportive cool uncle" in Homecoming, saying, "Fury sees Peter Parker as an asset that he needs who is too preoccupied with a bunch of high school problems." Watts originally pitched Fury as a mentor to Peter in Homecoming.
- Zendaya as MJ: Peter's classmate and love interest. Her full name, Michelle Jones-Watson, is revealed in the sequel Spider-Man: No Way Home (2021).
- Cobie Smulders as Maria Hill: A former high-ranking S.H.I.E.L.D. agent who works closely with Nick Fury.
- Jon Favreau as Happy Hogan:
  The head of security for Stark Industries and former driver and bodyguard of Tony Stark who looks after Peter. Watts noted Happy would be used to explore the idea of "trying to find your place in the world if the center of your world is gone" given his close friendship to Stark.
- J. B. Smoove as Julius Dell:
  Peter's teacher and a chaperone on his school trip to Europe. The role was written for Smoove after the writers and director enjoyed his performance alongside Holland in an Audi commercial short film produced to promote Homecoming.
- Jacob Batalon as Ned Leeds: Peter's best friend. His last name is confirmed on-screen in No Way Home.
- Martin Starr as Roger Harrington: Peter's academic decathlon teacher and a chaperone on his school trip to Europe.
- Tony Revolori as Eugene "Flash" Thompson: Peter's rival.
- Marisa Tomei as May Parker: Peter's aunt who is aware of his secret identity and wants him to be Spider-Man more so he can help with charitable causes.
- Jake Gyllenhaal as Quentin Beck / Mysterio:
  A former Stark Industries employee and holographic-illusions specialist who masquerades as a superhero from Earth-833 in the multiverse. He is recruited by Nick Fury to help Spider-Man stop the Elementals. Gyllenhaal shared ideas with the writers regarding the character's personality, and was drawn to the idea that Beck is "manipulating everyone's love of superheroes and that need for heroes". Gyllenhaal wanted to play the character's fake backstory as realistically as possible. Regarding Beck's relationship with Peter, Watts says that "If Tony Stark was sort of the mentor in the previous films, we thought it would be interesting to play Mysterio as almost like the cool uncle". Watts was excited to have Beck team with Fury and Peter as it introduced the character to the MCU "in a way that people weren't expecting".

Angourie Rice and Jorge Lendeborg Jr. reprise their roles from Homecoming as Peter's classmates Betty Brant, Ned's on-and-off girlfriend, and Jason Ionello. Peter Billingsley reprises his role from Iron Man (2008) as scientist William Ginter Riva, a former employee of Stark Industries who now works with Beck. J. K. Simmons appears as J. Jonah Jameson in the mid-credits scene, marking the first time an actor has reprised a non-MCU role in an MCU film after Simmons portrayed a different incarnation of Jameson in Sam Raimi's Spider-Man film trilogy. Ben Mendelsohn and Sharon Blynn make uncredited cameo appearances in the post-credits scene as the Skrulls Talos and Soren, reprising their roles from Captain Marvel (2019); this scene reveals that they have been posing as Fury and Hill during the film.

Additionally, Numan Acar portrays Fury's associate Dimitri, while Remy Hii plays Brad Davis, a popular student whom Peter sees as competition for MJ's affection, and Claire Rushbrook portrays Janice Lincoln, a woman working for Beck. Zach Barack, the first openly transgender actor in an MCU film, portrays one of Peter's new classmates, Zach, while Zoha Rahman also appears as a classmate of Peter's. Dawn Michelle King, an assistant editor on many MCU films including Far From Home, provides the voice for the artificial intelligence E.D.I.T.H. Jeff Bridges and Robert Downey Jr. appear as Obadiah Stane and Stark through the use of archival footage from Iron Man and Captain America: Civil War (2016), respectively. Images from previous MCU films of Downey Jr., Chris Evans, Scarlett Johansson, and Paul Bettany as Stark, Steve Rogers / Captain America, Natasha Romanoff / Black Widow, and Vision, respectively, are used in the film's opening "in memoriam" segment.

== Production ==
=== Development ===
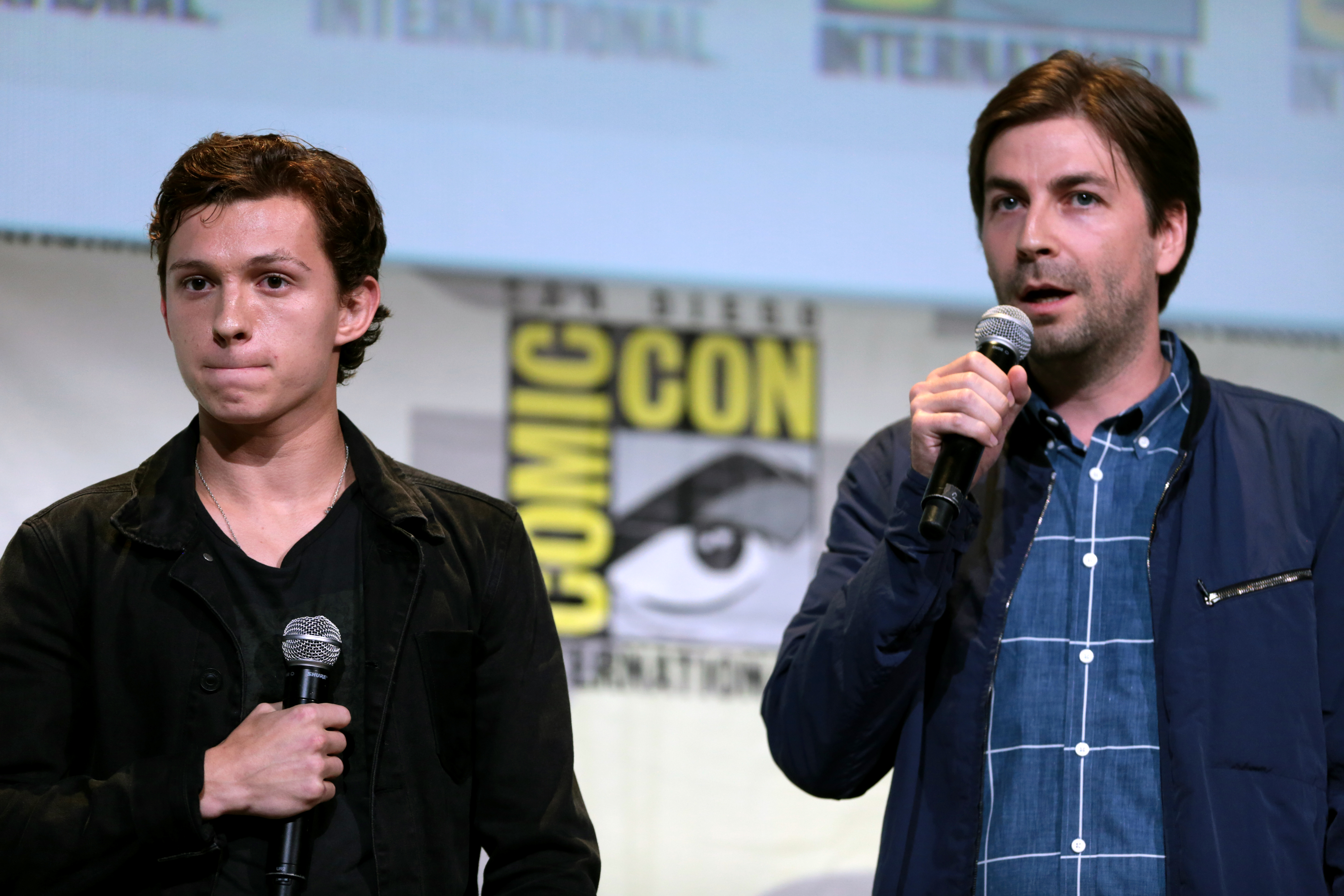
Actor Tom Holland (L) and director Jon Watts (R) were signed to return for the sequel early in development.

In June 2016, Sony Pictures chairman Tom Rothman stated that Sony and Marvel Studios were committed to making future Spider-Man films after Spider-Man: Homecoming (2017). The following month, Marvel Studios president Kevin Feige said if additional films were made, the company had an early idea to follow the model of the Harry Potter film series, and have the plot of each film cover a new school year, with a second film intended to take place during Peter Parker / Spider-Man's junior year of high school. By October, discussions had begun for a second film, including which villain would be featured, according to Spider-Man actor Tom Holland, who was signed for two more Spider-Man films after Homecoming. In December, after the successful release of the first Homecoming trailer, Sony slated a sequel to the film for July 5, 2019. Sony's insistence that the sequel be released in 2019 complicated Marvel's preference for secrecy regarding their plans for Spider-Man in this film and their other MCU films, since the character would die at the end of Avengers: Infinity War (2018), and would not be resurrected before Avengers: Endgame in April 2019 by which time marketing for this film would have already begun.

After being able to include Robert Downey Jr.'s Tony Stark / Iron Man for Homecoming, Sony was revealed in June 2017 to have the use of another Marvel Studios-controlled character for the sequel. Feige stated that Marvel and Sony were "just starting to solidify our plans" for the film, and felt Spider-Man's appearances in Infinity War and Endgame would "launch him off into a very new cinematic universe at that point", similar to how Captain America: Civil War (2016) "informed everything in Homecoming". Marvel and Sony both wanted Homecoming director Jon Watts returning for the sequel, with Feige saying "that's the intention for sure", and Watts said he was signed for another Spider-Man film. Feige said the sequel would have a subtitle like Homecoming, and would not feature "2" in the title. He added that filming was expected to begin in April or May 2018. As with Homecoming, Feige said the film's villain would be one that had not yet been seen in film. By July, Watts was in negotiations with the studios regarding his return for the sequel, and Marisa Tomei expressed interest in returning as Aunt May from the previous films. That same month, Watts expressed interest in including Morbius, Blade, or the Chameleon in the sequel.

The film is set eight months after the conclusion of Endgame. Watts felt dealing with many of the unanswered questions from Endgame posed "a fun creative challenge" for the Far From Home team. They looked to "make a movie that's in that world and deals with those stories but is also still [a] fun Spider-Man movie". For example, Ned, MJ, and Flash all turned to dust during the events of Infinity War along with Peter, while some of his classmates did not and are now five years older due to the events of Endgame. Watts compared this dynamic to the film Flight of the Navigator (1986), calling the situation "really weird ... but ... also something you can have a lot of fun with".

=== Pre-production ===
At the end of August 2017, as the film was entering pre-production, Chris McKenna and Erik Sommers were in final negotiations to return from Homecoming to write the sequel. In early October, Jacob Batalon confirmed he would reprise his role of Ned Leeds in the sequel. Feige confirmed that Watts was returning to direct the sequel in December. By February 2018, Zendaya was slated to return for the film, reprising her role as Michelle "MJ" Jones-Watson. Location scouting for the film began at the end of the month, as did the pre-visualisation process for the creative team to begin planning action sequences and visual effects for the film. By late April, Feige stated that filming was scheduled to begin in early July 2018, and would primarily occur in London. This was a change from the first film, which was mostly produced in Atlanta. Feige explained that one of the reasons behind this change in location was because a majority of the sequel would be spent around the world, outside New York City.

A month later, Jake Gyllenhaal entered negotiations to play Quentin Beck / Mysterio, while Tomei and Michael Keaton were confirmed to reprise their respective roles of May and Adrian Toomes / Vulture; Gyllenhaal's casting was confirmed a month later, but Watts later stated that Keaton and Laura Harrier, who played Toomes' daughter Liz in Homecoming, would not be appearing in the sequel. Also in May, McKenna and Sommers were also confirmed as the film's screenwriters. They began working on the film from a set of notes that Marvel had put together based on different influences and story ideas. This included the directive that the film would be releasing shortly after Endgame and would need to deal with the death of Stark due to the relationship between that character and Spider-Man that previous films had established. The film also needed to deal with the aftereffects of "The Blip", the five-year period between Infinity War and Endgame where half of all life disappeared. Mysterio was chosen to be the film's villain because he is one of Spider-Man's iconic villains that had yet to be featured in a film, and because his history of deception in the comics lent itself to a character who could take advantage of a Spider-Man that is mourning the death of Stark. This also allowed the writers to explore relevant modern themes such as fake news. Mysterio's plan went through several iterations, including an early suggestion that he could be an alien Skrull in disguise.

The film reuses two of Spider-Man's costumes from the previous films: his main costume from Civil War and Homecoming, and the Iron Spider suit from Infinity War and Endgame. It also introduces two new costumes: a black "stealth" costume given to Peter by Nick Fury, and a new, upgraded Spider-Man suit that Peter designs for himself at the end of the film. Marvel Studios' head of visual development Ryan Meinerding explained that Watts had wanted to include a suit inspired by the Spider-Man Noir version of the character, which led to the design of the more tactical stealth suit. He added that the suit represents Peter experimenting with being a new kind of superhero. Other tactical costumes from the comic books were looked at when developing this one, but Meinerding felt they looked less practical than the more straightforward Noir inspiration. The costume includes tactical goggles that can be flipped up. For Peter's new self-designed costume, Meinerding originally designed it with the idea that it would be made from Peter's webbing since that is the strongest material he has access to. Practical versions of the costumes were created by Ironhead Studio, who previously worked on The Amazing Spider-Man films (2012–2014). For Far From Home, Ironhead developed a skull cap for the costumes that has built-in fans to prevent the goggles from steaming up. They also developed a magnetic bellows system for connecting the goggles to the mask, so they could be easily removed but not fall off during action sequences.

At the end of June 2018, Holland revealed the film's title to be Spider-Man: Far From Home. Feige explained that they decided to have Holland reveal the title because they thought it was likely that it would leak after filming began anyway. He compared the title to Homecoming in that it is "full of alternate meaning" while continuing the use of "Home", and revealed the film's premise to be Peter and his friends going to Europe on a summer field trip, away from their home of New York. The creative team had discussions about featuring New Asgard as one of the destinations for Peter's field trip in the film.

=== Filming ===
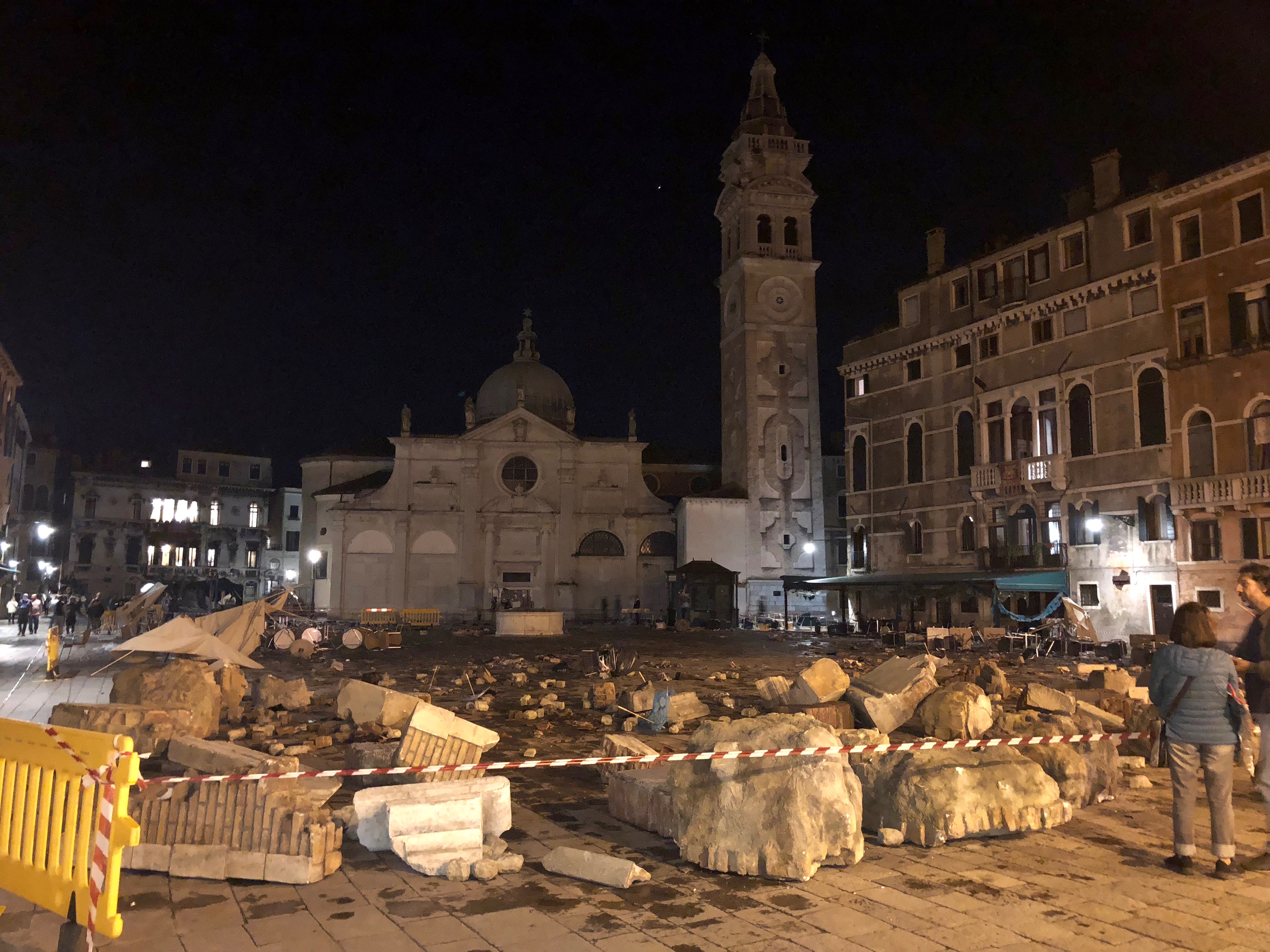
The set of the film in Venice, Italy

Principal photography began on location in Hertfordshire, England, on July 2, 2018, under the working title Fall of George. Matthew J. Lloyd served as director of photography, after previously working with Watts on Cop Car (2015). Watts had wanted to work with Lloyd on Homecoming, but the cinematographer was working on Power Rangers (2017) at the time. Filming moved to London, with locations including East London, and at London Stansted Airport. Studio work occurred at Warner Bros. Studios Leavesden near Watford, England, where a Venice set was created on one of the studio's backlots. Shortly after filming began, set photos revealed Hemky Madera would return as bodega owner Mr. Delmar, while J.B. Smoove and Numan Acar joined the cast. By early August, Samuel L. Jackson and Cobie Smulders were confirmed to be appearing in the film, reprising their respective roles of Nick Fury and Maria Hill from previous MCU films, and Remy Hii joined the cast later in the month. Filming took place in Prague and Liberec in the Czech Republic in September, and moved to Venice by the end of the month. Filming moved to New York City and Newark, New Jersey in October, where it used the working title Bosco. Locations included areas around Madison Square Garden and Penn Station, and Newark Liberty International Airport. An uncredited actor was originally cast as Flash Thompson's father for the airport scene, but Tony Revolori had pitched to producer Chris Buongiorno about having Flash's butler Gerald show up at the airport instead as a "funnier" option, so the crew shot the scene twice, one version with the actor playing Flash's father and the other one with the butler respectively, with the latter being chosen. Filming wrapped on October 16, 2018.

Lloyd explained that the creative team had approached the film as a road-trip story, and so he wanted to maintain the distinct look and feel of each location visited. This meant giving each stop on the school trip a distinct lighting scheme and color palette. For example, Lloyd visited Venice three times during location scouting to discuss how the scenes there would be filmed, and learned that the city has a "bright, pastel feel, where the light comes through and hits a building. It bathes people in this warm, sandy light". Prague, on other hand, has a "more warm and cool mix, and the beauty of that sort of Baroque, eastern-European architecture." The production took advantage of lighting already on the buildings in Prague, which are often lit for texture in real life. Lloyd felt comfortable working within the aesthetic of the MCU after acting as director of photography on the first season of the Marvel Television series Daredevil (2015–2018) and the miniseries The Defenders (2017), as well as working on additional photography for the films Thor: Ragnarok (2017) and Captain Marvel (2019). Lloyd originally began planning to use the Alexa 65 cameras that Marvel usually films with, but Sony asked that they focus on optimizing the footage for their 2K releases, so the production switched to Alexa Mini cameras. This ended up being a lot easier for the camera department to use on location, and for combining live-action shooting with visual effects elements.

=== Post-production ===
In late October 2018, Sony Pictures reached a new multi-film agreement with IMAX Corporation to release their films in IMAX, including Far From Home. At Sony's CCXP Brazil panel in December 2018, it was revealed that the Elementals—a group of characters based on the elements of water, earth, air, and fire—would appear in the film. The four Elementals are modeled after different Spider-Man villains from Marvel comic books: the water Elemental borrows from Hydro-Man, the fire Elemental borrows from Molten Man, the Earth Elemental borrows from Sandman, and the air Elemental borrows from Cyclone. The names of these other villains are not given to the characters in the film, albeit Hydro-Man's public identity as Morris Bench is mentioned at one point. In addition to these characters, there were also discussions about using the villain Swarm as a model for a potential fifth Elemental in the film. Martin Starr was confirmed to be reprising his role as Roger Harrington from Homecoming the next month. Following up Revolori's pitch for Flash's family life, the filmmakers added during the E.D.I.T.H. scene the text of Flash texting his parents. In April 2019, Sony moved the film's release date up to July 2, 2019. While promoting Endgame at a fan event in Shanghai, Feige said Far From Home would be the final film of the MCU's Phase Three, rather than the start of Phase Four as some had believed. Also in April, Jackson returned to do reshoots for the film.

Discussing the film's mid-credits scene, Watts explained that they approached J.K. Simmons "as late as possible" before the film's release to ask him to reprise his role as J. Jonah Jameson from Sam Raimi's Spider-Man film trilogy (2002–2007), hoping to keep the cameo a surprise for fans. Watts acknowledged that there was a chance Simmons would not want to reprise the role, but stated that he never considered another actor, saying, "It's gotta be him. Like, if it wasn't him, it wasn't worth doing." After being pitched the idea for the cameo, Simmons called Raimi and received the director's blessing to return to the role for the new film. The MCU version of the character is brand new, not the Raimi version "from another dimension or multiverse". Simmons' footage was filmed in a Disney conference room in front of a green screen. Watts noted that Simmons' performance was over-the-top in Raimi's films, but now that same performance has real-world comparisons, such as Alex Jones. According to Feige, the changes in the real world also meant that moving the character from a newspaper editor to a "radical right news journalist that kind of scream[s] in front of the camera" made more sense. Simmons said he and Watts did not see "eye to eye" on the film's contemporary portrayal of the character versus his performance in Raimi's films.

Watts described Far From Home as a "con man movie" with "so many layers of deception", and for the post-credits scene he felt that ending the film with "one last twist" was on theme. He felt that he owed the fans a more substantial post-credits scene than the jokey one at the end of Homecoming. The Far From Home scene depicts Fury on vacation, in a simulation, both of which are also themes in the film, and reveals that the Fury and Hill seen throughout the film are actually the Skrulls Talos and Soren in disguise, with Ben Mendelsohn and Sharon Blynn reprising their roles from Captain Marvel, respectively. Watts felt this twist made sense after Fury's interactions with the Skrulls in Captain Marvel. Footage of Jackson and Smulders originally intended for the film's opening scene was used in the reveal. Smulders learned about the twist from Feige shortly before the film's release. Post-production for Far From Home was completed in June 2019.

==== Visual effects ====
External videos
- Marvel Studios' Spider-Man: Far From Home – End Credits Main on End Title Sequence presents the film's main-on-end title sequence, YouTube video from Perception's channel

The film's visual effects were provided by Framestore, Industrial Light & Magic, Image Engine, Sony Pictures Imageworks, Luma Pictures, Rising Sun Pictures, Scanline VFX, Territory Studio, and Method Studios. Janek Sirrs served as visual effects supervisor on the film, and explained that following the release of the animated film Spider-Man: Into the Spider-Verse (2018) the effects team looked for ways to use similarly inventive visuals in Far From Home. They ultimately did not use added effects to represent Spider-Man's Spider-sense because these did not fit within the live-action world or were too similar to previous effects, such as Daredevil's sonar vision. They did try to use Spider-Man's actions and the use of his abilities to show his growth since Homecoming, but to also show his "reach as always exceeding his grasp as he refines his superhero skills". The film's main-on-end title sequence was designed by Perception.

Method Studios added Spider-Man to a Venice speedboat scene, using their Spider-Man suit asset from Homecoming. Image Engine created the Stark jet, drone, and satellite. The jet work included the creation of a new Spider-Man suit, for which the vendor had to design the interior of the suit based on a scan of a practical costume they were given. They also made a Netherlands tulip field for a scene that was filmed in a grass field in the UK. It required around two million digital tulips. Rising Sun Pictures created the holograms used by Mysterio when he first explains the Elementals to Spider-Man, which include simulations of black-holes and elements researched from real-world history and mythology. The company aimed for the holograms to have a similar quality to the ones that they had created for Captain Marvel. Mysterio was designed by Ryan Meinerding, Marvel Studios' head of visual development, to look like a combination of different Marvel heroes such as Thor and Doctor Strange. His fishbowl helmet is retained from the comics. Sirrs described the character as a "larger-than-life showman at heart" and almost a superhero version of Liberace. The digital model for Mysterio was created by Scanline.

The Elementals consisted of animated figures, often driven by slowed-down motion-capture performances, with environmental effects layered on top. Scanline created Earth and Water, Luma created Fire, and Imageworks created the final amalgamation of the four creatures, referred to as the Super Uber Elemental (SUE). For the Fire Elemental, Luma created different looks and actions for the character to show Watts and Sirrs potential designs and movements for the character. This included a progression where the creature goes from being upright and humanoid to bigger and more hunched over as it consumes metal throughout the sequence. Watts responded positively to movements that looked more creature-like. The final battle was created by Imageworks, and consists of over 300 visual effects shots. In addition to creating the SUE—which required extensive effect simulations for the different combined elements such as "water tentacles", rocks, lava, and lightning—the company had to create a digital model of the Tower Bridge for the fight to take place around. The company attempted to fully render only small sections of the bridge where needed, but ultimately required around 80% of the bridge to be fully detailed due to how much of it is seen throughout the fight. They made use of Image Engine's Stark jet model and Scanline's Mysterio asset for the fight, and created the drone models and new Spider-Man suit that were used by the other vendors. They started with a single drone design that featured missiles, cannons, and Gatling guns, but this became repetitive during the battle and so flamethrower and sonic blaster drones were added. Additionally, the sky and environment needed to be digitally replaced in most of the sequence.

Framestore handled the "Illusion Battle" sequence in which Mysterio traps Spider-Man within a series of elaborate fear-based illusions. Based on early prototypes of the sequence from Framestore, Marvel decided to extend it to around 150 shots. It was heavily pre-visualized to define which background plates and motion-capture performances would be required; Framestore visual effects supervisor Alexis Wajsbrot compared the motion-capture process for the sequence to automated dialogue replacement, where each short section of the performance was captured individually. The company used existing digital assets from other vendors, including for the different Spider-Man suits, combined with new models such as those for statues of fallen heroes or a "Zombie Iron Man". The effect of green smoke that is throughout the sequence was created using Houdini. Framestore took inspiration from the title sequences of the James Bond films, especially that of Spectre (2015) for the graveyard portion of the battle. For the transition between the real world and the illusions, Framestore had to match a similar transition from the B.A.R.F. scene in Civil War which Wajsbrot described as a time-consuming process for each environment in which it was required. Sirrs compared the sequence to an elaborate Broadway production with an unlimited budget, and named several other visual influences including the Looney Tunes short Duck Amuck (1953), Paprika (2006), A Nightmare on Elm Street (1984), and the "Pink Elephants on Parade" scene from Dumbo (1941).

== Music ==
Spider-Man: Homecoming composer Michael Giacchino was confirmed to return to score Far From Home in October 2018. Whitney Houston's "I Will Always Love You" plays during the Marvel Studios opening logo as part of the film's opening "in memoriam" scene. The end credits song is "Vacation" by The Go-Go's. The soundtrack album was released by Sony Classical on June 28, 2019.

== Marketing ==
Due to Peter dying at the end of Infinity War and not being resurrected until Endgame, Germain Lussier of io9 noted in May 2018 that Sony would either have to begin marketing this film only two months before its release or spoil the fact that Peter is resurrected for general audiences that may not realize that this would happen in Endgame. Lussier suggested the latter approach be taken, while a representative of Sony said the studio would be working with Marvel to "figure out the Spider-Man strategy". Holland and Gyllenhaal debuted the first trailer for Far From Home at Sony's CCXP Brazil panel on December 8, 2018. The footage does not acknowledge the events of Infinity War or Endgame, with Steven Weintraub of Collider describing it as a continuation of "the Spider-Man universe" only. Holland debuted the trailer publicly on his Instagram account on January 15, 2019. A slightly different "international version" was also released. Several news outlets commented on Peter's appearance in the trailer following the events of Infinity War, with Zack Straf of IndieWire pointing out that while the trailer reveals Peter's return, it does not explain how.

Adam Chitwood of Collider described the trailer as "cute and fun" just like Homecoming, and approved of the vacation storyline, the addition of Fury, and Mysterio's short appearance. He did think the film looked "the tiniest bit less special" when compared to the acclaimed animated film Spider-Man: Into the Spider-Verse. A teaser poster was released with the trailer showing Spider-Man's mask covered in travel stickers. Chitwood said the poster was "really fun, leaning into the whole 'summer vacation' vibe" while potentially hinting at the film's locations with the stickers. Graeme McMillian of The Hollywood Reporter felt the trailer presented the threat of the Elementals so audiences would be "thrown off the scent" of Mysterio being the villain. McMillian's colleague Richard Newby felt the "main takeaway from the trailer is that Spider-Man: Far From Home is deftly blending old and new school elements of the Spider-Man mythos, for a result that feels surprisingly fresh". Newby was also excited about the inclusion of Fury. Forbes's Scott Mendelson felt the trailer showed "the sheer confidence" of Sony in its Spider-Man films, especially after the successes of Homecoming, Venom (2018), and Into the Spider-Verse. The trailer received 130 million views in 24 hours, surpassing Homecoming (116 million views) as the most viewed Sony Pictures trailer in that time period.

On May 6, 2019, a second trailer for the film was released. The trailer featured an introduction from Holland warning viewers that it includes spoilers for Avengers: Endgame. Watts, who knew the plots of Infinity War and Endgame and worked with the Russo brothers on Spider-Man's appearances in those films, was relieved that the trailer's release allowed him to speak more openly about Far From Home. The second trailer was viewed 135 million times in 24 hours, surpassing the first Far From Home trailer as the most viewed Sony Pictures trailer in that time period. Beginning the weekend after the trailer's release, screenings of Endgame began with a message from Holland telling audiences to stay till the end of the credits, with the trailer played at the end of the film. Marvel previously added a trailer for The Avengers (2012) to the end of Captain America: The First Avenger (2011). United Airlines served as a promotional partner on the film, with one of their Boeing 777 aircraft and several United employees appearing in the film. As done with previous MCU films, Audi also sponsored the film, promoting several vehicles such as the e-tron SUV, while having some of their other vehicles appear in the film. Partnering with several other companies, including Dr Pepper, Papa John's Pizza, and Burger King, the film had a total promotional marketing value of $288 million, the largest for a film ever.

Ahead of the film's home media release, in September 2019, Sony released a "Night Monkey" trailer, featuring footage from the film of Spider-Man in his jokey alter-ego of the same name. Lussier said the trailer was clever, and "in terms of repurposing old footage in fun, funny new ways, you have to give Sony a tip of the cap for this." Later in the month, Sony created a real version of the fictional TheDailyBugle.net website as part of a viral marketing campaign to promote the home media release of the film. Inspired by real-world "conspiracy-pushing" websites such as that of Alex Jones, the website features Simmons reprising his role as Jameson in a video where he speaks out against Spider-Man and in support of Mysterio, before adding "Thanks for watching. Don't forget to like and subscribe!" The website includes testimonials from supposed victims of "the Blip", including one complaining that they disappeared in a dangerous situation and were seriously injured when they reappeared. This contradicts a statement by Feige saying that anyone in such a situation would have reappeared safely. Several days after this was pointed out, the website was updated to say this story was faked for an insurance claim.

== Release ==
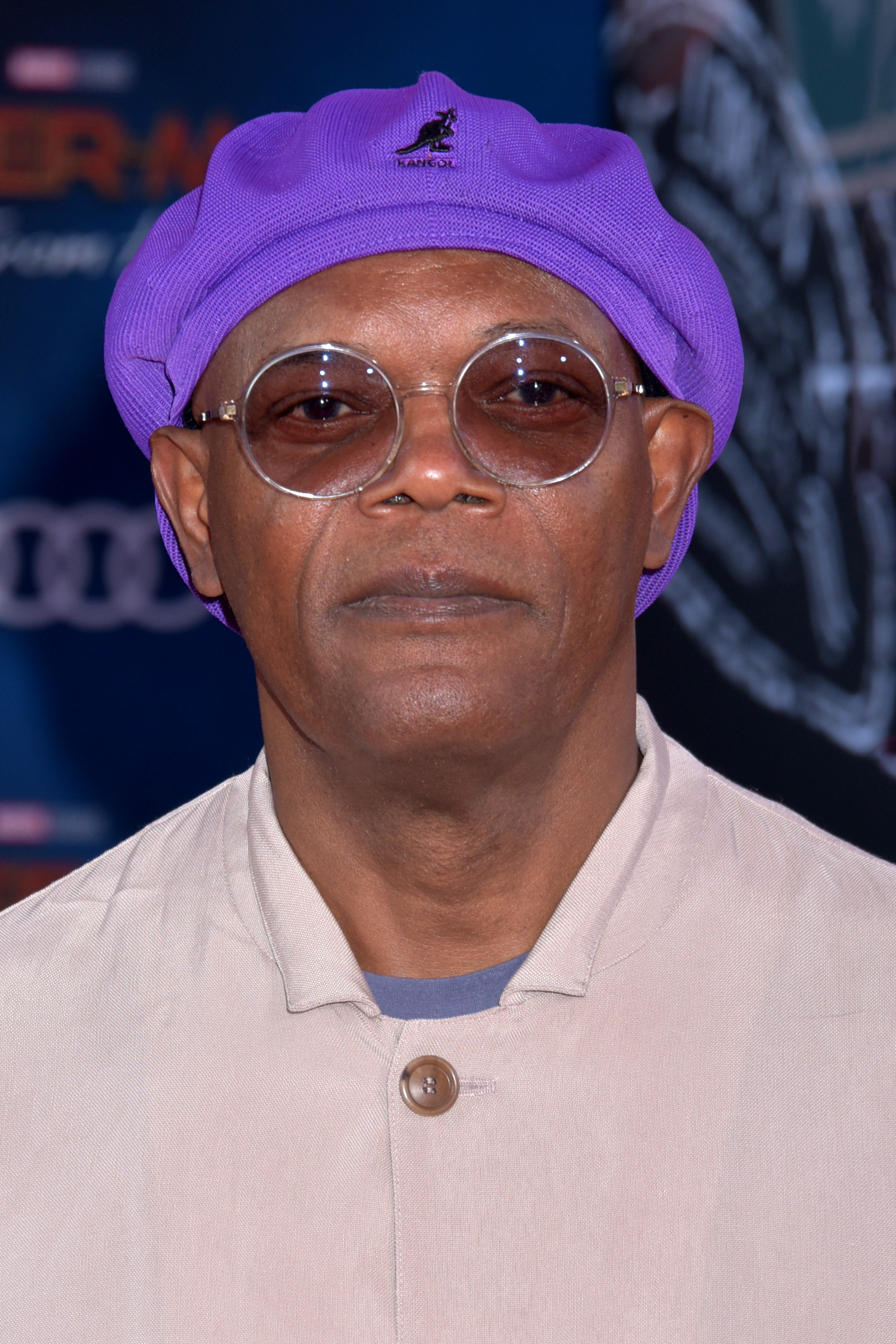
Samuel L. Jackson at the film's Hollywood, Los Angeles, premiere in June 2019

=== Theatrical ===
Spider-Man: Far From Home had its world premiere at the TCL Chinese Theatre in Hollywood, Los Angeles, on June 26, 2019. The film was released on June 28, in China and Japan, and in the United States on July 2, in 3D and IMAX. In the United States, it opened in 4,634 theaters, which was second all-time behind Avengers: Endgame. It was originally scheduled to be released on July 5. An "extended cut" of the film was re-released on Labor Day weekend, beginning August 29, with four minutes of extra footage and a poster featuring artwork by the winner of a fan-art contest. Spider-Man: Far From Home was the last film released in Phase Three of the MCU, and the conclusion of the Infinity Saga.

In March 2024, Sony announced that all of their live-action Spider-Man films would be re-released in theaters as part of Columbia Pictures' 100th anniversary celebration. Spider-Man: Far From Home was re-released on May 27, 2024.

=== Home media ===
Spider-Man: Far From Home was released by Sony Pictures Home Entertainment on digital on September 17, 2019, and on Ultra HD Blu-ray, Blu-ray, and DVD on October 1. The home media release features a short film titled Peter's To-Do List, which uses scenes of Peter retrieving various items for his trip that were cut from the theatrical release of the film. The short also includes footage featuring Hemky Madera reprising his Homecoming role as Mr. Delmar, the owner of a local bodega, which was all cut from Far From Home.

In April 2021, Sony signed a deal with Disney giving them access to their legacy content, including past Spider-Man films and Marvel content in Sony's Spider-Man Universe, to stream on Disney+ and Hulu and appear on Disney's linear television networks. Disney's access to Sony's titles would come following their availability on Netflix. Far From Home had previously been available on Starz and FX. The film became available on Disney+ in the United States on November 3, 2023.

== Reception ==
=== Box office ===
Spider-Man: Far From Home grossed $391.3 million in the United States and Canada, and $741.3 million in other territories, for a worldwide total of $1.132 billion. It was the fourth-highest-grossing film of 2019 and the 24th-highest-grossing film of all time. On August 18, 2019, the film surpassed Skyfall (2012) to become Sony Pictures' highest-grossing film worldwide. Far From Home was the first Spider-Man film to gross over $1 billion. Deadline Hollywood calculated the film's net profit as $339 million, accounting for production budgets, marketing, talent participation, and other costs; box office grosses and home media revenues placed it seventh on their list of 2019's "Most Valuable Blockbusters".

Three weeks before its domestic release, official industry tracking had the film grossing around $170 million over its six-day opening frame. Some had the film reaching as high as $200 million, while others were at a conservative $165 million; Sony was predicting a $154 million debut. By the week of release industry estimates lowered to $140 million, with the studio expecting $120 million, due to the recent underperformance of other sequels. Far From Home made a Tuesday-opening record $39.3 million, including an estimated $2.8–3 million from midnight previews at about 1,000 theaters. It then made $27 million on its second day, the best-ever Wednesday gross for an MCU film, and $25.1 million on the 4th of July, the second highest ever total for the holiday behind Transformers ($29 million in 2007). In its opening weekend the film made $92.6 million, and a total of $185.1 million over the six-day frame, topping the $180 million made by Spider-Man 2 over its six-day July 4 opening in 2004; it was the number one film for the weekend. In its second weekend, the film made $45.3 million, again topping the box office with a 51% decrease from the first week; lower than Homecoming's 62% drop in its second box office weekend. Far From Home grossed over $21 million in its third weekend but was dethroned by newcomer The Lion King. It completed its box office run as the seventh highest-grossing film of 2019 in this region.

Far From Home was projected to gross around $350 million worldwide by the end of its first week of release, and about $500 million over its first 10 days. In China and Japan, where it was released a week prior to its U.S. debut, the film was expected to gross around a combined $90 million in its opening weekend. In China, where pre-sale tickets were less than Homecoming's, the film made $35.5 million on its first day, including $3.4 million from midnight previews (the fourth-best of all time for a superhero film in the country). It ended up slightly over-performing, debuting at $111 million including $98 million in China, the fourth-best-ever superhero opening in the country. Far From Home ended up grossing $580.1 million worldwide over its first 10 days of release, including $238 million from international territories in its opening weekend. In China, the film had a 10-day total of $167.4 million, and its other biggest debuts were in South Korea ($33.8 million), the United Kingdom ($17.8 million), Mexico ($13.9 million) and Australia ($11.9 million).

=== Critical response ===
The review aggregator Rotten Tomatoes reported an approval rating of 91%, with an average score of 7.4/10, based on 456 reviews. The website's critics' consensus reads, "A breezily unpredictable blend of teen romance and superhero action, Spider-Man: Far From Home stylishly sets the stage for the next era of the MCU." Metacritic, which uses a weighted average, assigned the film a score of 69 out of 100 based on reviews from 55 critics, indicating "generally favorable" reviews. Audiences polled by CinemaScore gave the film an average grade of "A" on an A+ to F scale, while those at PostTrak gave it a 76% "definite recommend".

Owen Gleiberman of Variety praised Holland's performance and wrote, "By the end, this Spider-Man really does find his tingle, yet coming after Into the Spider-Verse, with its swirling psychedelic imagery and identity games and trap doors of perception, Spider-Man: Far From Home touches all the bases of a conventional Marvel movie. It doesn't take you out of this world. But it's good enough to summon the kick—or maybe just the illusion—of consequence." Writing for the Chicago Sun-Times, Richard Roeper gave the film 3 out of 4 stars, calling it "zesty, sweet and satisfying" and praised the performances of the cast. Bernard Boo of PopMatters praised the film, commenting, "Spider-Man: Far From Home is technically the final film in Phase [Three] of the MCU, and it's hard to think of a better way to send off the most successful run of one of the highest grossing franchises in history". Brian Lowry of CNN wrote, "Even with a plot that builds off the emotional heft of Endgame, another mediocre villain, heavy dose of Disney Channel-level romance and too much clunky shtick... made this feel qualitatively more like a middle-weight contender." Adam Graham of The Detroit News gave it a "B" grade, stating that "it's the closest to The Matrix the MCU has ever come, and Far From Home is the first Marvel film to hold a mirror up to the audience watching in theaters." Alonso Duralde of TheWrap said that the film feels like "a charming teen road-trip comedy that occasionally turns into a superhero movie", which he said was a compliment. He highlighted the cast, including the chemistry between Holland, Zendaya and Batalon, and said that Gyllenhaal "nails his character's earnestness but also clearly enjoys a few moments that let him channel every exasperated-sigh, I-just-want-to-get-this-right male diva director he's ever known."

In a 3 out of 5 review, Tara Brady of The Irish Times said, "At its best and funniest, Jon Watt's second Spider-Man film plays like Sweet Valley High with a powered guest star. But as a Marvel film, it's a little flat and low-key." Writing for IndieWire, David Ehrlich gave the film a grade of "C" and, despite complimenting the cast, called the film an "unadventurous bit of superhero housekeeping that only exists to clean up the mess that Avengers: Endgame left behind". He criticized the character development of Spider-Man, feeling that he does not change throughout the film beyond becoming more confident. He described the action as "plastic", and felt that the film did not give enough attention to its teen elements. Ehrlich said it might be enough to satisfy fans but called it a "failure when compared to the remarkable artistry of Into the Spider-Verse or the raw pathos of Sam Raimi's Spider-Man 2 (2004)". John Anderson of The Wall Street Journal praised Holland and Zendaya's performances, but described the film as "a visually incoherent, effects-heavy superhero movie", and called the dialogue "dire".

=== Accolades ===
Accolades received by Spider-Man: Far From Home
Award	Date of ceremony	Category	Recipient(s)	Result	Ref.
AACTA Awards	December 4, 2019	Best Visual Effects or Animation	Brendan Seals, Michael Perdew, Andrew Zink, and Adam Gailey	Won	
Annie Awards	January 25, 2020	Outstanding Achievement for Character Animation in a Live Action Production	Steven Argula and Joakim Riedinger	Nominated	
Critics' Choice Movie Awards	January 12, 2020	Best Action Movie	Spider-Man: Far From Home	Nominated	
Dragon Awards	September 1, 2019	Best Science Fiction or Fantasy Movie	Spider-Man: Far From Home	Nominated	
Hollywood Critics Association Awards	January 9, 2020	Best Blockbuster	Spider-Man: Far From Home	Nominated	
Hollywood Music in Media Awards	November 20, 2019	Best Original Score in a Sci-Fi/Fantasy Film	Michael Giacchino	Nominated	
Hollywood Professional Association Awards	November 12, 2019	Outstanding Visual Effects – Feature Film	Alexis Wajsbrot, Stephen Kennedy, Nathan McConnel, Sylvain Degrotte, and Jonathan Opgenhaffen	Nominated	
Movieguide Awards	January 24, 2020	Best Movie for Mature Audiences	Spider-Man: Far From Home	Nominated	
National Film & TV Awards	December 3, 2019	Best Feature Film	Spider-Man: Far From Home	Nominated	
National Film & TV Awards	December 3, 2019	Best Actor	Tom Holland	Nominated	
National Film & TV Awards	December 3, 2019	Best Supporting Actress	Zendaya	Nominated	
National Film & TV Awards	December 3, 2019	Best Supporting Actor	J. B. Smoove	Won	
Nickelodeon Kids' Choice Awards	May 2, 2020	Favorite Movie	Spider-Man: Far From Home	Nominated	
Nickelodeon Kids' Choice Awards	May 2, 2020	Favorite Movie Actor	Tom Holland	Nominated	
Nickelodeon Kids' Choice Awards	May 2, 2020	Favorite Movie Actress	Zendaya	Nominated	
Nickelodeon Kids' Choice Awards	May 2, 2020	Favorite Superhero	Tom Holland (Note: Also for Avengers: Endgame (2019))	Won	
People's Choice Awards	November 10, 2019	Movie of 2019	Spider-Man: Far From Home	Nominated	
People's Choice Awards	November 10, 2019	Action Movie of 2019	Spider-Man: Far From Home	Nominated	
People's Choice Awards	November 10, 2019	Male Movie Star of 2019	Tom Holland	Nominated	
People's Choice Awards	November 10, 2019	Female Movie Star of 2019	Zendaya	Won	
People's Choice Awards	November 10, 2019	Action Movie Star of 2019	Tom Holland	Won	
Saturn Awards	September 13, 2019	Best Comic-to-Film Motion Picture	Spider-Man: Far From Home	Nominated	
Saturn Awards	September 13, 2019	Best Supporting Actress	Zendaya	Won	
Saturn Awards	September 13, 2019	Best Performance by a Younger Actor	Tom Holland	Won	
Saturn Awards	September 13, 2019	Best Special Effects	Spider-Man: Far From Home	Nominated	
Teen Choice Awards	August 11, 2019	Choice Summer Movie	Spider-Man: Far From Home	Won	
Teen Choice Awards	August 11, 2019	Choice Summer Movie Actor	Tom Holland	Won	
Teen Choice Awards	August 11, 2019	Choice Summer Movie Actress	Zendaya	Won	
Visual Effects Society Awards	January 29, 2020	Outstanding Effects Simulations in a Photoreal Feature	Adam Gailey, Jacob Santamaria, Jacob Clark, and Stephanie Molk for "Molten Man"	Nominated	

== Sequel ==
In September 2019, Marvel Studios and Sony Pictures announced that they were set to produce a third film, after an impasse between the two companies during negotiations. Watts returned to direct, from a script by McKenna and Sommers. Holland, Zendaya, Favreau, Tomei, Batalon, and Revolori reprise their roles, while Benedict Cumberbatch and Benedict Wong reprise their MCU roles as Doctor Strange and Wong. Spider-Man: No Way Home features several actors reprising their roles from past Spider-Man films, including Tobey Maguire and Andrew Garfield as their versions of Spider-Man from Sam Raimi's Spider-Man trilogy (2002–2007) and Marc Webb's The Amazing Spider-Man films (2012–2014), nicknamed "Peter-Two" and "Peter-Three" respectively, alongside Willem Dafoe as Norman Osborn / Green Goblin, Alfred Molina as Otto Octavius / Doctor Octopus, and Thomas Haden Church as Flint Marko / Sandman from the Raimi trilogy, as well as Rhys Ifans as Curt Connors / Lizard and Jamie Foxx as Max Dillon / Electro from the Webb films. The film was released on December 17, 2021.
