= Mister Jip =

- Mister Jip as depicted in X-Men: Earth's Mutant Heroes (May 2011).

Publication information
- Publisher: Marvel Comics
- First appearance: Strange Tales #8 (Nov. 1987) (in host body); Strange Tales #10 (1988) (true form)
- Created by: Terry Austin; Bret Blevins

In-story information
- Abilities: Vast magical abilities; Energy projection; Astral projection; Teleportation; Possession

Mister Jip is a fictional character appearing in American comic books published by Marvel Comics. He is an evil sorcerer, possessing a grotesque appearance and various mystical powers.

== Publication history ==
Mister Jip has almost exclusively appeared as a villain to Cloak and Dagger, first in Strange Tales volume 3 and later in their own series with one appearance in an X-Men annual.

Creator Terry Austin recounted that "readers had obviously gotten tired of seeing Cloak and Dagger endlessly go up against drug dealers, who, let’s face it, would never pose much of a challenge to them. Characters are never more interesting than when they have a seemingly unopposable force to push against, and to that end I came up with what I hoped would be their major reoccurring arch-foe, the maniacal Mr. Jip, and his foot soldiers Night and Day".

== Fictional character biography ==
The man who would become known as Mister Jip was born centuries ago somewhere in Asia. He roamed the world as a scholar in the pursuit of knowledge and went to Tibet to find the legendary city of Kamar-Taj. Though the city was in ruins, Jip encountered the Ancient One and became his first apprentice. As his student, Jip was instructed in the arts of benevolent magic, but unknown to his master, he sought out books of dark magic and practiced forbidden rituals to increase his own power. When the Ancient One discovered this, he cast Jip out of his service. Jip began extending his lifespan by usurping the bodies of others. These days Jip likes to think that he still did some good, as it was his example that allowed the Ancient One to recognize the signs of Baron Mordo's betrayal centuries later.

Out on his own, Jip wanted to increase his knowledge of the dark arts even further. To do so he started to extend his life at the cost of others, but these dark arts twisted his body into a monstrous shape. Despite his desire to dominate the world, Jip stayed hidden over the centuries and rarely revealed himself to others.

He appeared to Cloak, disguised in the host body of a store clerk. Cloak had become powerless and felt that without his powers his partner Dagger would not be interested in him anymore. Jip returned his powers in exchange for a price. Jip later battled Cloak and Dagger with his thralls, Night and Day, who had powers similar to Cloak and Dagger. Jip's price for his services would turn out to be Cloak's body as his new host. Dagger was shocked that Cloak would give up his chance at a normal life and left him, but returned in time to stop Jip from taking over Cloak's body and drove him off. Jip then forced Cloak to deliver Dagger into his clutches, then imprisoned him. Jip would fight and manipulate Cloak and Dagger over the next few months, often acting through his minions Day and Night, while at other times he would act to protect them.

Through Night, Jip later fomented battle between the possessed Dagger and members of X-Factor. The plot was foiled by Cloak, but Dagger was blinded as a result. Jip was revealed as the master of the insane former priest Francis Delgado. Jip was revealed to have restored Brigid O'Reilly and made her his spy by replacing one of her eyes with one of his.

Jip also used the X-Men as his agents once during the events of Atlantis Attacks. He repulsed an attempt by the members of the Serpent Society to steal one of his mystical artifacts. He temporarily switched the minds of the captive Dazzler and Diamondback into each other's bodies. He fomented a battle between the X-Men and the Serpent Society. However, he failed to prevent the theft of his artifact by Sidewinder and Diamondback, who turned it over to their clients Ghaur and Llyra.

Mister Jip later bargained with Doctor Doom to trade Dagger for a book of black magic in Doom's possession. Jip murdered Francis Delgado and usurped his body. As Delgado, he murdered Michael Bowen, Dagger's uncle, and accompanied Dagger to Latveria. Jip's attempt to deliver Dagger to Doctor Doom was foiled by Cloak, Night, Brigid O'Reilly and "Rusty" Nales. Jip restored Dagger's sight, but was seemingly destroyed by Night.

== Powers and abilities ==
Mister Jip possesses vast magical abilities, especially in the realm of black magic. He has the ability to manipulate magical forces for a variety of effects, including teleportation, energy projection, physical malleability, the ability to cancel out or tamper with the magic of others, and the tapping of extra-dimensional energy by invoking entities or objects of power existing in dimensions tangential to Earth's through the recitation of spells. He can create illusions, observe other places by scrying and conjure into being mindless minions to perform simple tasks, like a flying creature that he uses as his spy. He uses a large part of these powers to mask his presence to hide himself from more powerful mages like Doctor Strange.

His most important ability is the ability to take over a host body, adding his victim's life span to his own. To do this, he has to initiate a process where he removes the ties between his victim's body and soul and absorb the body into his own.

== Other versions ==
An alternate universe variant of Mister Jip from Earth-1610 appears in the Ultimate Marvel imprint. This version is a human drug dealer who can transform into a monstrous purple form. He is later killed by Terror, who overloads his body with energy and causes him to melt.

== In other media ==
Mister Jip was intended to appear in the second season of Cloak & Dagger, but was ultimately dropped.
