= Kaluu =

Marvel Comics character

- Kaluu as depicted in Mighty Avengers (vol. 2) #11 (June 2014). Art by Greg Land (penciller), Jay Leisten (inker), and Frank D'Armata (colorist).

Publication information
- Publisher: Marvel Comics
- First appearance: Strange Tales #147 (August 1966)
- Created by: Stan Lee; Dennis O'Neil; Bill Everett

In-story information
- Alter ego: Kaluu
- Species: Human
- Team affiliations: The Mighty Avengers
- Abilities: Mastery of magic

Kaluu is a character appearing in American comic books published by Marvel Comics.

== Publication history ==
The character first appeared in the story "From the Nameless Nowhere Comes... Kaluu!" in Strange Tales #147 (Aug. 1966). The first five pages were written by Stan Lee, with Denny O'Neil writing the other half of the story (credited as "Our Vacationin' Sorcerer" and "Our Sorcerer's Apprentice", respectively), and Bill Everett provided all the art.

== Fictional character biography ==
Kaluu was born over five hundred years ago in the mystic city of Kamar-Taj in the Himalayan Mountains. He and the Ancient One trained in magic together and worked to eliminate disease, poverty, and suffering from Kamar-Taj. Varnae, the eldest of the true vampires, met with Kaluu and gave him knowledge from the Darkhold, a compendium of black magic. Kaluu used his sorcery to influence the minds of the people of Kamar-Taj. Eventually, Kaluu and the Ancient One cast a spell that eliminated disease, poverty, and suffering from Kamar-Taj and granted its people immortality. For more than a year, Kaluu slowly increased his control over the minds of the people of Kamar-Taj so that they become little more than puppets. Kaluu waged war against the Ancient One, who summoned a pestilence that almost wiped out the entire population of Kamar-Taj and forced Kaluu to flee to the dimension of Raggador.

Kaluu emerges from Raggador five centuries later and attempts to steal the Book of the Vishanti. Kaluu is defeated by Doctor Strange and hurled into another dimension, where he is placed in suspended animation.

The forces unleashed in a battle between Doctor Strange and Urthona frees Kaluu from his imprisonment. When he returns to Earth, Kaluu becomes a businessman and amasses a large fortune. He forms an alliance with the embattled Doctor Strange and tutors him in the practice of black magic. Alongside Strange, he battles Shuma-Gorath and various other ancient evils. Kaluu later appears as a member of the Mighty Avengers.

== Powers and abilities ==
Kaluu has the ability to manipulate magical forces for a vast number of effects, including levitation, teleportation, energy projection, conjuration of small physical objects, physical transformation of objects, and the tapping of extra-dimensional energy by invoking entities or objects of power existing in dimensions tangential to Earth's through the recitation of spells. He has used this skill to render himself immortal. He also has the powers of mesmerism, thought-casting, illusion-casting, and astral projection.

According to the back story of the character, Kaluu is possibly the most powerful living human black magician. Kaluu's magic derives not only from personal, universal and dimensional powers: he has powers gained through the tapping of the life forces of living beings and the manipulation of the environment in certain ways that have destructive side effects.

Kaluu has used mystical means to render himself immortal. He does not age, but he can be killed by external means.

Kaluu is a master of various Asian martial arts, but prefers not to engage in physical combat. He has extensively studied sorcery and possesses vast knowledge of black magical lore.
