= Hammer and Anvil (comics) =

Fictional comic book villains

Publication information
- Publisher: Marvel Comics
- First appearance: Hulk #182 (December 1974)
- Created by: Len Wein (writer); Herb Trimpe (artist)

In-story information
- Base(s): Deterrence Research Corporation
- Member(s): Hammer; Anvil

Hammer and Anvil are supervillains appearing in American comic books published by Marvel Comics.

== Publication history ==
Hammer and Anvil first appeared in Hulk #182 (December 1974), and were created by Len Wein and Herb Trimpe.

== Fictional character biographies ==
Leroy "Hammer" Jackson is an African-American prisoner said to hate everyone and everything. As part of a chain gang, Hammer is chained to white supremacist Johnny Anvil. The pair's hatred of prison, however, is stronger than their hate for each other and they succeed in escaping the chain gang while still chained together. When the two encounter an alien who had crashed on Earth, Hammer attempts to kill it, but inadvertently saves the creature's life; it feeds on metal and uses the bullets fired at it to regenerate. Out of gratitude, the alien replaces the chain linking Hammer and Anvil with a device that grants them superhuman powers. The two return to prison seeking revenge and end up battling the Hulk.

Hammer and Anvil are hired as field operatives by the Deterrence Research Corporation. They encounter and battle Spider-Man and the Guardians of the Galaxy.

Lured into the Nevada desert to fight the Hulk, Hammer is shot through the head by the Scourge of the Underworld, disguised as a Native American shaman. Due to his link to Hammer, Anvil dies soon afterward.

== Powers and equipment ==
Hammer and Anvil are linked at the wrist by an energy chain that gives them the ability to absorb kinetic energy and convert it into strength. However, this also causes them to share pain.
