= Ancient One =

Fictional character appearing in American comic books published by Marvel Comics

- The Ancient One promotional art by Carl Potts

Publication information
- Publisher: Marvel Comics
- First appearance: Strange Tales #110 (July 1963)
- Created by: Stan Lee; Steve Ditko

In-story information
- Species: Human
- Team affiliations: Ancient Ones; Strange Academy
- Partnerships: Doctor Strange
- Notable aliases: The Master; The High Lama; The Mystic; The Spirit Leopard
- Abilities: Vast Magical Powers; Energy blasts; Teleportation; Illusions generation; Astral projection

The Ancient One is a fictional character appearing in American comic books published by Marvel Comics. He was the mentor of Doctor Strange and was his predecessor as Sorcerer Supreme.

The character was voiced by Michael Ansara in the 1978 television film Dr. Strange. Tilda Swinton portrayed a female Celtic version of the character in the Marvel Cinematic Universe films Doctor Strange (2016), Avengers: Endgame (2019), and the Disney+ series What If...? (2021).

== Publication history ==
The Ancient One was created by Stan Lee and Steve Ditko and first appeared in Strange Tales #110 (cover-dated July 1963).

The character has appeared in some Marvel Comics graphic novels. Doctor Strange: Season One (January 2, 2012, by Greg Pak and illustrated by Emma Ríos), Doctor Strange - Marvel Masterworks Volume 1, and Doctor Strange: From the Marvel Vault #1 (June 15, 2011, by Roger Stern and illustrated by Neil Vokes).

== Fictional character biography ==
The character who would eventually become the Ancient One was born in Kamar-Taj, "a hidden land high in the Himalayas", more than 500 years ago. He spent his youth as a simple farmer, until his friend Kaluu learned to wield magic. When Kaluu shared his discovery with the Ancient One, the two disagreed on how to use it. The Ancient One sought to use their power for the benefit of others, while Kaluu desired power and conquest over nearby villages.

The Ancient One and Kaluu combined their powers to transform Kamar-Taj into a paradise where no one grew old or sick. Kaluu then cast a second spell, placing the inhabitants under his control and declaring himself their ruler. The Ancient One defeats Kaluu in mystical combat, but Kamar-Taj and its people are destroyed. After banishing Kaluu to another dimension, the Ancient One loses his immortality and much of his original power. Nonetheless, he retains a slowed aging process and an unsurpassed knowledge of sorcery.

=== Acquiring knowledge ===
Introduction of the Ancient One's native home, the "hidden land" of Kamar-Taj, identified only as in the Himalaya mountains. Strange Tales #148 (September 1966). Script by Denny O'Neil, art by Bill Everett.

Wiser from his past experiences, the Ancient One settles in the Himalayas and trains an order of monks to support and aid him. In a tournament organized by the sorcerer Aged Genghis, the Ancient One wins the title of Earth's Sorcerer Supreme and subsequently takes on a chosen successor, who later becomes Mister Jip. The successor is subsequently banished for studying forbidden works of dark magic; fearful of unleashing evil upon the world, the Ancient One decides not to train a new successor.

=== Taking an apprentice ===
Centuries pass, and as the Ancient One realizes that his advanced age will eventually prevent him from defending Earth, he approaches Anthony Druid, a psychiatrist with mystical talents. Posing as the "High Lama", the Ancient One trains Druid to become Doctor Druid. However, he deems Druid insufficient to become Sorcerer Supreme.

After a car crash, surgeon Stephen Strange seeks assistance from the Ancient One to cure the nerve damage in his hands, only to angrily refuse when offered to be the Ancient One's apprentice instead. Strange then learns that Mordo, a monk considered the best of the Ancient One's pupils, plans to usurp him and unleash the demonic force Dormammu to consume the universe. Restrained by Mordo's spells, Strange sheds his selfish nature and wishes to learn magic so he may aid the Ancient One. The Ancient One promptly frees Strange from his restraints and explains the whole situation.

Mordo is chased away, and Stephen becomes the Ancient One's successor under the name Doctor Strange. The Ancient One continues to assist Strange. When the extra-dimensional monster Shuma-Gorath tries to invade Earth through the Ancient One's mind while the latter is in the Crypts of Kaa-U, the Ancient One prompts Strange to psychically purge his mind of ego, or sense of self. While this action blocks the way for Shuma-Gorath, trapping him within the Ancient One's mind, the Ancient One's physical body disintegrates. His soul subsequently achieves transcendence and becomes an avatar of Eternity. Strange inherits the Ancient One's title as Sorcerer Supreme.

=== The next life ===
During Hercules' journey to the underworld in Dark Reign, the Ancient One is seen in Erebus gambling for his resurrection. As explained to Hercules, the afterlife has become a shambles, due to various entities not paying attention.

During a demonic invasion of New York via the Eye of Agamotto, Iron Fist is transported to a white void when he comes in contact with the Eye, resulting in a face-to-face confrontation with a form that appears to be the Ancient One; the form claims that both he and a currently-unidentified associate are responsible for the demonic invasion due to his anger at Strange's recent "failures". However, a casual comment by Spider-Man prompts Strange, Doctor Voodoo, and Daimon Hellstrom to realize that they are dealing with Agamotto himself, as the Ancient One's demands for the Eye defy everything that was previously told to Strange about how the Eye is passed from one sorcerer to another.

After Strange (who is no longer the Sorcerer Supreme) defeats Daniel Drumm's ghost using dark magic that does not control him, the Ancient One's spirit appears and speaks to him:

You taught yourself to vanquish a foe who used your friends as weapons against. And you did it without hurting any of them. You protected this realm even though it is no longer your duty. I know that you relinquished your role as Sorcerer Supreme because you thought you did not deserve it anymore. Yet you continued to act as hero to anyone and everyone. And you asked for nothing in return. And because of this, I bequeath you once again the all-seeing Eye of Agamotto. For you are the Sorcerer Supreme once more."

The Ancient One in spirit form provides guidance as a teacher to multiple magical students in a school established by Strange.

== Powers and abilities ==
The Ancient One possessed the ability to manipulate the forces of magic for a vast number of effects and was able to tap into extra-dimensional energy by invoking entities or objects of power, existing in dimensions tangential to those of the Earth, through the recitation of spells. The Ancient One was capable of astral projection, levitation, interdimensional teleportation, and a large number of other effects. However, in his extreme old age, the Ancient One was unable to perform any major feats of sorcery without placing great physical strain upon himself.

The Ancient One also possessed a variety of mystical objects, such as the Book of the Vishanti, the Orb, Amulet, and Eye of Agamotto, and devices gathered throughout his lifetime. After he unified with Eternity, the extent of the Ancient One's powers ceased to be known.

== Other versions ==
- An alternate universe version of the Ancient One makes a cameo appearance in a flashback in "Heroes Reborn" #3 in which he trained the Blur.
- An alternate universe version of the Ancient One appears in the graphic novel Dr. Strange: Season One. This version is more sociable, willing to make self-deprecating jokes, and likes to form friendships with outsiders.
- An alternate universe version of the Ancient One appears in J. Michael Straczynski's Strange. This version is an ancient magician who is physically frail from old age, but spiritually and psychically powerful.

== In other media ==
=== Television ===
The Ancient One makes a non-speaking appearance in a flashback in the Spider-Man episode "Doctor Strange".

=== Film ===
- The Ancient One appears in Dr. Strange (1978), voiced by Michael Ansara.
- The Ancient One appears in Doctor Strange: The Sorcerer Supreme, voiced by Michael Yama.

=== Marvel Cinematic Universe ===
Tilda Swinton as the Ancient One in Doctor Strange (2016).

The Ancient One appears in media set in the Marvel Cinematic Universe (MCU), portrayed by Tilda Swinton. This version is depicted as an androgynous Celt to reflect the mystery of the character. Following her first appearance in the live-action film Doctor Strange (2016), alternate timeline variants appear in the live-action film Avengers: Endgame (2019) and the Disney+ animated series What If...? (2021) episode "What If... Doctor Strange Lost His Heart Instead of His Hands?".

=== Video games ===
- The Ancient One appears in Marvel: Ultimate Alliance, voiced by James Sie.
- The Ancient One appears as a playable character in Marvel: Future Fight. Additionally, the MCU incarnation appears as an unlockable alternate skin.
- The Ancient One appears as a playable character in Marvel Super War.
