= Glorian =

Publication information
- Publisher: Marvel Comics
- First appearance: As Thomas Gideon: Fantastic Four #34 (January 1965); As Glorian: The Incredible Hulk (vol. 2) #190 (August 1975)
- Created by: As Thomas Gideon: Stan Lee, Jack Kirby; Gerry Conway, John Buscema; As Glorian: Len Wein, Herb Trimpe

In-story information
- Alter ego: Thomas Gideon
- Team affiliations: Shaper of Worlds; Four Muses
- Notable aliases: The Dreamer; Glorian
- Abilities: Ability to create hyperspatial "rainbow bridges"; Reality and tachyon manipulation; Limited telepathy

Thomas Gideon is a character appearing in American comic books published by Marvel Comics. Created by writer Gerry Conway and artist John Buscema, the character first appeared in Fantastic Four #135 (June 1973). Gideon is primarily known as Glorian. He is also called the Maker of Miracles and serves the Shaper of Worlds.

== Publication history ==
Thomas Gideon debuted in Fantastic Four #135 (June 1973), created by Gerry Conway and John Buscema. He appeared in the 2022 Defenders Beyond series.

== Fictional character biography ==
Thomas Gideon, son of billionaire Gregory Gideon and his wife Claire, was born in Rochester, New York. After being involved in a plane crash, the Gideons are rescued and hospitalized, where they learn that they are dying of radiation poisoning. Gregory attempts to use the mutated genes of the Fantastic Four to cure himself, but is defeated and killed after Dragon Man escapes his control. The Shaper of Worlds cures Thomas's radiation poisoning and takes him in as his apprentice Glorian. Glorian has had multiple encounters with the Hulk and once attempted to give him his heart's desire.

Glorian later reappears in the Annihilation miniseries, manipulating Gamora and Ronan the Accuser to reshape the world. This is interrupted by the forces of Annihilus, forcing Glorian to kill instead of create.

In Secret Wars, Silver Surfer and Dawn Greenwood escape the destruction of the multiverse and help Glorian and his assistant Zee rebuild it. However, Glorian manipulates them into helping him kill the Shaper of Worlds.

In Defenders: Beyond, Glorian encounters the Defenders and traps them in an illusory universe. However, America Chavez escapes due to wearing the Eternity Mask and frees the other Defenders.

== Powers and abilities ==
Glorian possesses powerful psionic abilities that enable him to manipulate matter and energy. By controlling light, he can create portals and move faster than the speed of light. Additionally, he possesses telepathy that enables him to control the minds of others and create illusions. Glorian once trapped the Defenders in a dreamlike reality where their ideal lives have come true.

== In other media ==
Glorian appears in the Avengers Assemble episode "Hulk's Day Out", voiced by Robin Atkin Downes. This version is a craftsman and friend of the Hulk.
