= List of Marvel Comics first appearances =

This article contains a list of the first appearances of significant artifacts, characters, locations, species and teams in Marvel Comics, its predecessors Timely Comics and Atlas Comics, and imprints.

== List ==
| Entry | Debut date | Creator(s) | First appearance |
|---|---|---|---|
| Atlanteans (Homo mermani) | 1939-04 | Bill Everett | Motion Picture Funnies Weekly #1 |
| Atlantis (Note: Atlantis was not identified by name until Sub-Mariner Comics #31 (April 1949).) | 1939-04 | Bill Everett | Motion Picture Funnies Weekly #1 |
| Namor | 1939-04 | Bill Everett | Motion Picture Funnies Weekly #1 |
| Angel (Thomas Halloway) | 1939-10 | Paul Gustavson | Marvel Comics #1 |
| Dorma | 1939-10 | Bill Everett | Marvel Comics #1 |
| Human Torch (android) | 1939-10 | Carl Burgos | Marvel Comics #1 |
| Ka-Zar (David Rand) | 1939-10 | Bob Byrd | Ka-Zar #1 |
| Masked Raider | 1939-10 | Al Anders | Marvel Comics #1 |
| Betty Dean | 1940-01 | Bill Everett | Marvel Mystery Comics #3 |
| Fiery Mask | 1940-01 | Joe Simon | Daring Mystery Comics #1 |
| Electro (robot) | 1940-02 | Steve Dahlman | Marvel Mystery Comics #4 |
| Ferret | 1940-02 | Stockbridge Winslow, Irwin Hasen | Marvel Mystery Comics #4 |
| Laughing Mask | 1940-02 | Will Harr, Maurice Gutwirth | Daring Mystery Comics #2 |
| Mister E | 1940-02 | Joe Cal Cagno, Al Carreno | Daring Mystery Comics #2 |
| Dynamic Man | 1940-03 | Daniel Peters | Mystic Comics #1 |
| Breeze Barton | 1940-04 | Jack Binder | Daring Mystery Comics #3 |
| Taxi Taylor | 1940-05 | | Mystic Comics #2 |
| Master Mind Excello | 1940-05 | Arnold Hicks | Mystic Comics #2 |
| Phantom Reporter | 1940-05 | Robert Erisman, Sam Cooper | Daring Mystery Comics #3 |
| Marvel Boy (t) | 1940-06 | Joe Simon, Jack Kirby | Daring Mystery Comics #6 |
| Thin Man | 1940-06 | Klaus Nordling | Mystic Comics #4 |
| Black Widow (Claire Voyant) | 1940-08 | George Kapitan, Harry Sahle | Mystic Comics #4 |
| Human Top (Bruce Bravelle) | 1940-08 | Dick Briefer | Red Raven Comics #1 |
| Red Raven | 1940-08 | Joe Simon, Louis Cazeneuve | Red Raven Comics #1 |
| Falcon (Carl Burgess) | 1940-10 | Bill Everett | Mystic Comics #2 |
| Toro | 1940-10 | Carl Burgos | Mystic Comics #2 |
| Vision (Aarkus) | 1940-11 | Joe Simon, Jack Kirby | Marvel Mystery Comics #13 |
| Abraham Erskine | 1941-03 | Joe Simon, Jack Kirby | Captain America Comics #1 |
| Betsy Ross | 1941-03 | Joe Simon, Jack Kirby | Captain America Comics #1 |
| Bucky Barnes | 1941-03 | Joe Simon, Jack Kirby | Captain America Comics #1 |
| Blazing Skull | 1941-03 | Bob Davis | Mystic Comics #5 |
| Black Marvel | 1941-03 | Al Gabriele | Mystic Comics #5 |
| Terror | 1941-03 | Phil Sturm, Syd Shores, George Klein | Mystic Comics #5 |
| Captain America | 1941-03 | Joe Simon, Jack Kirby | Captain America Comics #1 |
| Michael Duffy | 1941-03 | Joe Simon, Jack Kirby | Captain America Comics #1 |
| Blue Diamond | 1941-04 | Joe Simon, Jack Kirby | Daring Mystery Comics #7 |
| Challenger | 1941-04 | Charles Nicholas Wojtkoski | Daring Mystery Comics #7 |
| Fin | 1941-04 | Bill Everett | Daring Mystery Comics #7 |
| Patriot (Jeffrey Mace) | 1941-04 | Ray Gill, Bill Everett | Human Torch Comics #4 |
| Silver Scorpion | 1941-04 | Harry Sahle | Daring Mystery Comics #7 |
| Thunderer | 1941-04 | Carl Burgos, John Compton | Daring Mystery Comics #7 |
| Circus of Crime | 1941-08 | | Captain America Comics #5 |
| Jack Frost | 1941-08 | Stan Lee, Charles Nicholas Wojtkoski | U.S.A. Comics #1 |
| Rockman | 1941-08 | "Charles Nicholas", Basil Wolverton | U.S.A. Comics #1 |
| Whizzer (Robert Frank) | 1941-08 | Al Avison | U.S.A. Comics #1 |
| Father Time | 1941-09 | Stan Lee | Captain America Comics #6 |
| Destroyer (Keen Marlow) (Note: Stan Lee's most popular character before the creation of the Fantastic Four.) | 1941-10 | Stan Lee | Mystic Comics #6 |
| Red Skull | 1941-10 | Joe Simon, Jack Kirby | Captain America Comics #7 |
| Armless Tiger Man | 1941-12 | Paul Gustavson, Allen Bellman | Marvel Mystery Comics #26 |
| Witness | 1941-12 | Stan Lee | Mystic Comics #7 |
| Black Fury (Miss Fury) | 1942 | Tarpé Mills | Miss Fury #1 |
| Citizen V | 1942-01 | Joe Simon, Jack Kirby | Daring Mystery Comics #8 |
| Powerhouse Pepper | 1942-04 | Basil Wolverton | Joker Comics #1 |
| V-Battalion | 1942-04 | Stan Lee | Comedy Comics #9 |
| Ziggy Pig and Silly Seal | 1942-07 | Al Jaffee | Krazy Komics #1 |
| Reaper (Gunther Strauss) | 1943-01 | Stan Lee, Al Avison | Captain America Comics #22 |
| Captain Wonder | 1943-02 | Otto Binder, Frank Giacoia | Kid Komics #1 |
| Tim Mulrooney | 1943-02 | Otto Binder, Frank Giacoia | Kid Komics #1 |
| Super Rabbit | 1943-03 | Ernie Hart | Comedy Comics #14 |
| Gail Richards | 1944-02 (film serial); 2002-03 (comics) | Royal Cole, Harry L. Fraser, Joseph F. Poland, Ronald Davidson, Basil Dickey, Jesse Duffy, Grant Nelson | Captain America (film serial); Ultimates #1 (comics) |
| Merlin | 1944-03 | Dan Berry | Young Allies #11 |
| Dorothy Walker (Betty) | 1944-11; 1980-11 (reimagining) | Stuart Little, Ruth Atkinson, David Michelinie, Mike Harris | Miss America Magazine #2; Defenders #89 (reimagining) |
| Miss America (Madeline Joyce) | 1944-11 | Otto Binder, Al Gabriele | Marvel Mystery Comics #49 |
| Mad Dog | 1944-11 | Stuart Little, Ruth Atkinson | Miss America Magazine #2 |
| Patsy Walker | 1944-11 | Stuart Little, Ruth Atkinson | Miss America Magazine #2 |
| Millie the Model | 1945 | | Millie the Model #1 |
| Blonde Phantom | 1946 | Stan Lee, Syd Shores | All Select Comics #11 |
| All Winners Squad | 1946-10 | Bill Finger | All Winners Comics #19 |
| Isbisa | 1946-10 | Bill Finger | All Winners Comics #19 |
| Byrrah | 1947-05 | Bill Everett, Jimmy Thompson | Marvel Mystery Comics #82 |
| Namora | 1947-05 | Ken Bald, Syd Shores | Marvel Mystery Comics #82 |
| Black Rider | 1948 | Syd Shores | All Western Winners #2 |
| Two-Gun Kid | 1948-03 | Stan Lee, Jack Kirby | Two-Gun Kid #1 |
| Golden Girl | 1948-04 | Bill Woolfolk, Syd Shores | Captain America Comics #66 |
| Kid Colt | 1948-08 | | Kid Colt #1 |
| Sun Girl | 1948-08 | Ken Bald | Sun Girl #1 |
| Venus | 1948-08 | Stan Lee, Ken Bald | Venus #1 |
| Zeus | 1949-06 | Stan Lee, Jack Kirby | Venus #5 |
| Loki | 1949-08 | unknown | Venus #6 |
| Heliopolitans | 1950-06 | Stan Lee, Werner Roth | Marvel Tales #96 |
| Apache Kid | 1950-11 | John Buscema | Two Gun Western #5 |
| Marvel Boy (Robert Grayson) | 1950-12 | Stan Lee, Russ Heath | Marvel Boy #1 |
| Jormungand (Midgard Serpent) | 1952-02 | | Marvel Tales #105 |
| Lorna the Jungle Girl | 1953-07 | Don Rico, Werner Roth | Lorna the Jungle Queen #1 |
| Zombie (Simon Garth) | 1953-07 | Stan Lee, Bill Everett | Menace #5 |
| Frankenstein's Monster | 1953-09 | Mary Shelley, Stan Lee, Joe Maneely | Menace #7 (Note: Based on the monster in the novel Frankenstein, published in 1818.) |
| Combat Kelly | 1953-10 | | Combat Kelly #1 |
| Gorilla-Man | 1954-03 | Robert Q. Sale | Men's Adventures #26 |
| M-11 (Human Robot) | 1954-05 | Stan Lee, John Romita Sr. | Menace #11 |
| Ringo Kid | 1954-09 | Joe Maneely | Ringo Kid Western #1 |
| Jann of the Jungle | 1954-09 | Don Rico, Arthur Peddy | Jungle Tales #1 |
| Outlaw Kid | 1954-09 | Doug Wildey | Outlaw Kid #1 |
| Western Kid | 1954-11 | John Romita Sr. | Western Kid #1 |
| Rawhide Kid | 1955-03 | Stan Lee, Bob Brown | Rawhide Kid #1 |
| Black Knight (Sir Percy) | 1955-05 | Stan Lee, Joe Maneely | Black Knight #1 |
| King Arthur | 1955-05 | Stan Lee, Joe Maneely | Black Knight #1 |
| Mordred | 1955-05 | Stan Lee, Joe Maneely | Black Knight #1 |
| Morgan le Fay | 1955-05 | Stan Lee, Joe Maneely | Black Knight #1 |
| Jimmy Woo | 1956-10 | Al Feldstein, Joe Maneely | Yellow Claw #1 |
| Yellow Claw | 1956-10 | Al Feldstein, Joe Maneely | Yellow Claw #1 |
| Shrunken Bones | 1958-04 | Angelo Torres | World of Fantasy #11 |
| Willie Lumpkin | 1959-12 (newspaper); 1963-02 (comics) | Stan Lee, Dan DeCarlo, Jack Kirby | syndicated newspaper strip Fantastic Four #11 (first comic book appearance) |
| Molten Man-Thing | 1960-01 | Stan Lee, Jack Kirby | Tales of Suspense #7 |
| Zetora | 1960-03 | Jack Kirby, Dick Ayers | Journey into Mystery #57 |
| Gorgolla | 1960-04 | Stan Lee, Jack Kirby, Dick Ayers | Strange Tales #74 |
| Chondu the Mystic | 1960-05 | Doug Wildey, George Evans, Steve Gerber, Sal Buscema | Tales of Suspense #9 |
| Dragoom | 1960-08 | Stan Lee, Jack Kirby | Strange Tales #76 |
| Bombu | 1960-09 | Stan Lee, Jack Kirby, Dick Ayers | Journey into Mystery #60 |
| Gorgilla | 1960-10 | Stan Lee, Jack Kirby | Tales to Astonish #12 |
| Master Khan | 1960-10 | Stan Lee, Steve Ditko | Strange Tales #77 |
| Groot | 1960-11 | Stan Lee, Jack Kirby, Dick Ayers | Tales to Astonish #13 |
| Xemnu | 1960-11 | Stan Lee, Jack Kirby | Journey into Mystery #62 |
| Rorgg | 1961-01 | Stan Lee, Jack Kirby, Dick Ayers | Journey into Mystery #64 |
| It! The Living Colossus | 1961-02 | Jack Kirby | Tales of Suspense #14 |
| Goom | 1961-03 | Stan Lee, Jack Kirby, Dick Ayers | Tales of Suspense #15 |
| Grogg | 1961-05 | Stan Lee, Jack Kirby, Dick Ayers | Strange Tales #83 |
| Googam | 1961-05 | Stan Lee, Steve Ditko | Tales of Suspense #17 |
| Doctor Druid | 1961-06 | Stan Lee, Jack Kirby | Amazing Adventures #1 |
| Klagg | 1961-09 | Stan Lee, Jack Kirby | Tales of Suspense #21 |
| Linda Carter | 1961-09 | Roy Thomas, Gene Colan, Stan Lee, Al Hartley, Jean Thomas | Linda Carter, Student Nurse #1 |
| Zzutak | 1961-09 | Stan Lee, Jack Kirby, Steve Ditko | Strange Tales #88 |
| Bruttu | 1961-10 | Stan Lee, Jack Kirby, Dick Ayers | Tales of Suspense #22 |
| Fin Fang Foom | 1961-10 | Stan Lee, Jack Kirby | Strange Tales #89 |
| Monsteroso | 1961-10 | Stan Lee, Jack Kirby | Amazing Adventures #5 |
| Fantastic Four | 1961-11 | Stan Lee, Jack Kirby | Fantastic Four #1 |
| Giganto | 1961-11 | Stan Lee, Jack Kirby | Fantastic Four #1 |
| Human Torch | 1961-11 | Stan Lee, Jack Kirby | Fantastic Four #1 |
| Invisible Woman | 1961-11 | Stan Lee, Jack Kirby | Fantastic Four #1 |
| Mister Fantastic | 1961-11 | Stan Lee, Jack Kirby | Fantastic Four #1 |
| Mole Man | 1961-11 | Stan Lee, Jack Kirby | Fantastic Four #1 |
| Orrgo | 1961-11 | Jack Kirby | Strange Tales #90 |
| Thing | 1961-11 | Stan Lee, Jack Kirby | Fantastic Four #1 |
| Tricephalous | 1961-11 | Stan Lee, Jack Kirby | Fantastic Four #1 |
| Daily Bugle | 1962-01 | Stan Lee, Jack Kirby | Fantastic Four #2 |
| Daily Globe | 1962-01 | Stan Lee, Jack Kirby | Fantastic Four #2 |
| Hank Pym | 1962-01 | Stan Lee, Jack Kirby | Tales to Astonish #27 |
| Skrulls | 1962-01 | Stan Lee, Jack Kirby | Fantastic Four #2 |
| Tim Boo Ba | 1962-02 | Stan Lee, Steve Ditko | Amazing Fantasy #9 |
| Baxter Building | 1962-03 | Stan Lee, Jack Kirby | Fantastic Four #3 (Note: First identified by name in Fantastic Four #6 (Sept. 1962).) |
| Fantasticar | 1962-03 | Stan Lee, Jack Kirby | Fantastic Four #3 |
| Miracle Man | 1962-03 | Stan Lee, Jack Kirby | Fantastic Four #3 |
| Oog | 1962-03 | Jack Kirby | Tales of Suspense #27 |
| Betty Ross | 1962-05 | Stan Lee, Jack Kirby | Incredible Hulk #1 |
| Gargoyle (Yuri Topolov) | 1962-05 | Stan Lee, Jack Kirby | Incredible Hulk #1 |
| Hulk (Bruce Banner) | 1962-05 | Stan Lee, Jack Kirby | Incredible Hulk #1 |
| Rick Jones | 1962-05 | Stan Lee, Jack Kirby | Incredible Hulk #1 |
| Thunderbolt Ross | 1962-05 | Stan Lee, Jack Kirby | Incredible Hulk #1 |
| Doctor Doom | 1962-07 | Stan Lee, Jack Kirby | Fantastic Four #5 |
| Doombots | 1962-07 | Stan Lee, Jack Kirby | Fantastic Four #5 |
| Aunt May | 1962-08 | Stan Lee, Steve Ditko | Amazing Fantasy #15 |
| Burglar | 1962-08 | Stan Lee, Steve Ditko | Amazing Fantasy #15 |
| Flash Thompson | 1962-08 | Stan Lee, Steve Ditko | Amazing Fantasy #15 |
| Sally Avril | 1962-08 | Stan Lee, Steve Ditko | Amazing Fantasy #15 |
| Spider-Man (Peter Parker) | 1962-08 | Stan Lee, Steve Ditko | Amazing Fantasy #15 |
| Uncle Ben | 1962-08 | Stan Lee, Steve Ditko | Amazing Fantasy #15 |
| Korg (Note: Korg was unnamed until The Incredible Hulk vol. 2 #93 (May 2006).) | 1962-08 | Stan Lee, Larry Lieber, Jack Kirby, Greg Pak, Carlo Pagulayan | Journey into Mystery #83 |
| Mjolnir (Note: First use of the name "Mjolnar" [sic] was in Thor #140 (May 1967).) | 1962-08 | Stan Lee, Jack Kirby, Joe Sinnott | Journey into Mystery #83 |
| Thor / Donald Blake | 1962-08 | Stan Lee, Jack Kirby | Journey into Mystery #83 |
| Ant-Man (Hank Pym) | 1962-09 | Stan Lee, Jack Kirby, Larry Lieber | Tales to Astonish #35 (Note: Hank Pym first appeared in Tales to Astonish #27 (Jan. 1962).) |
| Clown | 1962-09 | Stan Lee, Jack Kirby | Incredible Hulk #3 |
| Human Cannonball | 1962-09 | Stan Lee, Jack Kirby | Incredible Hulk #3 |
| Ringmaster | 1962-09 | Stan Lee, Jack Kirby | Incredible Hulk #3 |
| Strongman | 1962-09 | Stan Lee, Jack Kirby | Incredible Hulk #3 |
| Jane Foster | 1962-09 | Stan Lee, Larry Lieber, Jack Kirby | Journey into Mystery #84 |
| Asgard | 1962-10 | Stan Lee, Larry Lieber, Jack Kirby | Journey into Mystery #85 |
| Balder the Brave | 1962-10 | Stan Lee, Larry Lieber, Jack Kirby | Journey into Mystery #85 |
| Heimdall | 1962-10 | Stan Lee, Larry Lieber, Jack Kirby | Journey into Mystery #85 |
| Tyr | 1962-10 | Stan Lee, Larry Lieber, Jack Kirby | Journey into Mystery #85 |
| Alicia Masters | 1962-11 | Stan Lee, Jack Kirby | Fantastic Four #8 |
| Puppet Master | 1962-11 | Stan Lee, Jack Kirby | Fantastic Four #8 |
| Hulk Robot | 1962-11 | Stan Lee, Jack Kirby | Incredible Hulk #4 |
| Odin | 1962-11 | Stan Lee, Jack Kirby | Journey into Mystery #86 |
| Zarrko | 1962-11 | Stan Lee, Jack Kirby | Journey into Mystery #86 |
| Wizard | 1962-11 | Stan Lee, Larry Lieber, Jack Kirby | Strange Tales #102 |
| Egghead | 1962-12 | Stan Lee, Larry Lieber, Jack Kirby | Tales to Astonish #38 |
| Trapster | 1963-01 | Stan Lee, Jack Kirby | Strange Tales #104 (Note: Originally called Paste-Pot Pete, he was not called Trapster until Fantastic Four #38 (May 1965).) |
| Tyrannus | 1963-01 | Stan Lee, Jack Kirby | Incredible Hulk #5 |
| Hijacker | 1963-02 | Stan Lee, Larry Lieber, Jack Kirby | Tales to Astonish #40 |
| Impossible Man | 1963-02 | Stan Lee, Jack Kirby | Fantastic Four #11 |
| Chameleon | 1963-03 | Stan Lee, Steve Ditko | The Amazing Spider-Man #1 |
| J. Jonah Jameson | 1963-03 | Stan Lee, Steve Ditko | The Amazing Spider-Man #1 |
| John Jameson | 1963-03 | Stan Lee, Steve Ditko | The Amazing Spider-Man #1 |
| Ho Yinsen | 1963-03 | Stan Lee, Larry Lieber, Don Heck | Tales of Suspense #39 |
| Iron Man (Tony Stark) | 1963-03 | Stan Lee, Larry Lieber, Don Heck | Tales of Suspense #39 |
| Wong-Chu | 1963-03 | Stan Lee, Larry Lieber, Don Heck | Tales of Suspense #39 |
| Metal Master | 1963-03 | Stan Lee, Steve Ditko | Incredible Hulk #6 |
| Red Ghost | 1963-04 | Stan Lee, Jack Kirby | Fantastic Four #13 |
| Uatu | 1963-04 | Stan Lee, Jack Kirby | Fantastic Four #13 |
| Watchers | 1963-04 | Stan Lee, Jack Kirby | Fantastic Four #13 |
| Stark Industries | 1963-04 | Robert Bernstein, Stan Lee, Jack Kirby | Tales of Suspense #40 |
| Dino Manelli | 1963-05 | Stan Lee, Jack Kirby | Sgt. Fury and his Howling Commandos #1 |
| Dum Dum Dugan | 1963-05 | Stan Lee, Jack Kirby | Sgt. Fury and his Howling Commandos #1 |
| Gabe Jones | 1963-05 | Stan Lee, Jack Kirby | Sgt. Fury and his Howling Commandos #1 |
| Happy Sam Sawyer | 1963-05 | Stan Lee, Jack Kirby | Sgt. Fury and his Howling Commandos #1 |
| Howling Commandos | 1963-05 | Stan Lee, Jack Kirby | Sgt. Fury and his Howling Commandos #1 |
| Izzy Cohen | 1963-05 | Stan Lee, Jack Kirby | Sgt. Fury and his Howling Commandos #1 |
| Junior Juniper | 1963-05 | Stan Lee, Jack Kirby | Sgt. Fury and his Howling Commandos #1 |
| Nick Fury | 1963-05 | Stan Lee, Jack Kirby | Sgt. Fury and his Howling Commandos #1 |
| Rebel Ralston | 1963-05 | Stan Lee, Jack Kirby | Sgt. Fury and his Howling Commandos #1 |
| Frigga | 1963-05 | Stan Lee, Robert Bernstein, Joe Sinnott | Journey into Mystery #92 |
| Tinkerer | 1963-05 | Stan Lee, Steve Ditko | The Amazing Spider-Man #2 |
| Vulture | 1963-05 | Stan Lee, Steve Ditko | The Amazing Spider-Man #2 |
| Awesome Android | 1963-06 | Stan Lee, Jack Kirby | Fantastic Four #15 |
| Mad Thinker | 1963-06 | Stan Lee, Jack Kirby | Fantastic Four #15 |
| Yancy Street Gang | 1963-06 | Stan Lee, Jack Kirby | Fantastic Four #15 |
| Radioactive Man | 1963-06 | Stan Lee, Jack Kirby | Journey into Mystery #93 |
| Red Barbarian | 1963-06 | Stan Lee, Robert Bernstein, Don Heck | Tales of Suspense #42 |
| Sersi | 1963-06 | Jack Kirby | Strange Tales #109 (Note: Name originally spelled "Circe".) |
| Wasp (Janet van Dyne) | 1963-06 | Stan Lee, Jack Kirby | Tales to Astonish #44 |
| Ancient One | 1963-07 | Stan Lee, Steve Ditko | Strange Tales #110 |
| Doctor Strange | 1963-07 | Stan Lee, Steve Ditko | Strange Tales #110 |
| Kamar-Taj | 1963-07 | Stan Lee, Steve Ditko | Strange Tales #110 |
| Nightmare | 1963-07 | Stan Lee, Steve Ditko | Strange Tales #110 |
| Sanctum Sanctorum | 1963-07 | Stan Lee, Steve Ditko | Strange Tales #110 |
| Wong | 1963-07 | Stan Lee, Steve Ditko | Strange Tales #110 |
| Doctor Octopus | 1963-07 | Stan Lee, Steve Ditko | The Amazing Spider-Man #3 |
| Krang | 1963-07 | Stan Lee, Steve Ditko | Fantastic Four Annual #1 |
| Kala | 1963-07 | Stan Lee, Robert Bernstein, Jack Kirby | Tales of Suspense #43 |
| Asbestos Man | 1963-08 | Stan Lee, Ernie Hart, Dick Ayers | Strange Tales #111 |
| Baron Mordo | 1963-08 | Stan Lee, Ernie Hart, Dick Ayers | Strange Tales #111 |
| Hamir the Hermit | 1963-08 | Stan Lee, Ernie Hart, Dick Ayers | Strange Tales #111 |
| Avengers | 1963-09 | Stan Lee, Jack Kirby | Avengers #1 |
| Angel | 1963-09 | Stan Lee, Jack Kirby | X-Men #1 |
| Beast | 1963-09 | Stan Lee, Jack Kirby | X-Men #1 |
| Cyclops | 1963-09 | Stan Lee, Jack Kirby | X-Men #1 |
| Iceman | 1963-09 | Stan Lee, Jack Kirby | X-Men #1 |
| Jean Grey (Marvel Girl) | 1963-09 | Stan Lee, Jack Kirby | X-Men #1 |
| Magneto | 1963-09 | Stan Lee, Jack Kirby | X-Men #1 |
| Professor X | 1963-09 | Stan Lee, Jack Kirby | X-Men #1 |
| X-Mansion | 1963-09 | Stan Lee, Jack Kirby | X-Men #1 |
| X-Men | 1963-09 | Stan Lee, Jack Kirby | X-Men #1 |
| Betty Brant | 1963-09 | Stan Lee, Steve Ditko | The Amazing Spider-Man #4 |
| Liz Allan (Note: Liz may have had an anonymous cameo in Amazing Fantasy #15 (Aug. 1962).) | 1963-09 | Stan Lee, Steve Ditko | The Amazing Spider-Man #4 |
| Eel | 1963-09 | Stan Lee, Steve Ditko | Strange Tales #112 |
| Happy Hogan | 1963-09 | Stan Lee, Robert Bernstein, Don Heck | Tales of Suspense #45 |
| Pepper Potts | 1963-09 | Stan Lee, Robert Bernstein, Don Heck | Tales of Suspense #45 |
| Maha Yogi | 1963-09 | Stan Lee, Jack Kirby | Journey into Mystery #96 |
| Super-Skrull (Kl'rt) | 1963-09 | Stan Lee, Jack Kirby | Fantastic Four #18 |
| Crimson Dynamo | 1963-10 | Stan Lee, Don Heck | Tales of Suspense #46 |
| Plantman | 1963-10 | Stan Lee, Jerry Siegel, Dick Ayers | Strange Tales #113 |
| Porcupine | 1963-10 | Stan Lee, Don Heck | Tales to Astonish #48 |
| Sandman | 1963-10 | Stan Lee, Steve Ditko | The Amazing Spider-Man #4 |
| Surtur | 1963-10 | Stan Lee, Jack Kirby | Journey into Mystery #97 |
| Ymir | 1963-10 | Stan Lee, Jack Kirby | Journey into Mystery #97 |
| Avengers Mansion | 1963-11 | | Avengers #2 |
| Billy Connors | 1963-11 | Stan Lee, Steve Ditko | The Amazing Spider-Man #6 |
| Cloak of Levitation | 1963-11 | Stan Lee, Steve Ditko | Strange Tales #114 |
| Cobra | 1963-11 | Stan Lee, Don Heck | Journey into Mystery #98 |
| Danger Room | 1963-11 | Stan Lee, Jack Kirby | X-Men #2 (Note: An obstacle course appears in X-Men #1 (Sept. 1963) but is not called the Danger Room until this issue.) |
| Fred Duncan | 1963-11 | Stan Lee, Jack Kirby | X-Men #2 |
| Giant-Man | 1963-11 | Stan Lee, Jack Kirby | Tales to Astonish #49 |
| Limbo | 1963-11 | Stan Lee, Jack Kirby | Avengers #2 |
| Lizard | 1963-11 | Stan Lee, Steve Ditko | The Amazing Spider-Man #6 |
| Martha Connors | 1963-11 | Stan Lee, Steve Ditko | The Amazing Spider-Man #6 |
| Melter | 1963-11 | Stan Lee, Steve Ditko | Tales of Suspense #47 |
| Molecule Man | 1963-11 | Stan Lee, Jack Kirby | Fantastic Four #20 |
| Pamela Hawley | 1963-11 | Stan Lee, Jack Kirby | Sgt. Fury and his Howling Commandos #4 |
| Space Phantom | 1963-11 | Stan Lee, Jack Kirby | Avengers #2 |
| Vanisher | 1963-11 | Stan Lee, Jack Kirby | X-Men #2 |
| Eye of Agamotto | 1963-12 | | Strange Tales #115 |
| Hate-Monger | 1963-12 | Stan Lee, Jack Kirby | Fantastic Four #21 |
| Mister Hyde | 1963-12 | Stan Lee, Don Heck | Journey into Mystery #99 |
| Whirlwind | 1963-12 | Stan Lee, Jack Kirby | Tales to Astonish #50 |
| Baron Strucker | 1964-01 | Stan Lee, Jack Kirby | Sgt. Fury and his Howling Commandos #5 |
| Blob | 1964-01 | Stan Lee, Jack Kirby | X-Men #3 |
| Giants | 1964-01 | Stan Lee, Jack Kirby | Journey into Mystery #100 |
| Living Brain | 1964-01 | Stan Lee, Steve Ditko | The Amazing Spider-Man #8 |
| Sinister Six | 1964-01 | Stan Lee, Steve Ditko | Amazing Spider-Man Annual #1 |
| Black Knight (Nathan Garrett) | 1964-02 | Stan Lee, Dick Ayers | Tales to Astonish #52 |
| Electro | 1964-02 | Stan Lee, Steve Ditko | The Amazing Spider-Man #9 |
| Mandarin | 1964-02 | Stan Lee, Don Heck | Tales of Suspense #50 |
| Brotherhood of Mutants | 1964-03 | Stan Lee, Jack Kirby | X-Men #4 |
| Hela | 1964-03 | Stan Lee, Jack Kirby | Journey into Mystery #102 |
| Mastermind (Jason Wyngarde) | 1964-03 | Stan Lee, Jack Kirby | X-Men #4 |
| Norns | 1964-03 | Stan Lee, Jack Kirby | Journey into Mystery #102 |
| Quicksilver | 1964-03 | Stan Lee, Jack Kirby | X-Men #4 |
| Scarecrow | 1964-03 | Stan Lee, Don Heck | Tales of Suspense #51 |
| Scarlet Witch | 1964-03 | Stan Lee, Jack Kirby | X-Men #4 |
| Sif | 1964-03 | Stan Lee, Jack Kirby | Journey into Mystery #102 |
| Toad | 1964-03 | Stan Lee, Jack Kirby | X-Men #4 |
| Big Man | 1964-04 | Stan Lee, Steve Ditko | The Amazing Spider-Man #10 |
| Black Widow (Natasha Romanova) | 1964-04 | Stan Lee, Don Rico, Don Heck | Tales of Suspense #52 |
| Daredevil | 1964-04 | Stan Lee, Bill Everett | Daredevil #1 |
| Dwarves | 1964-04 | Stan Lee, Jack Kirby | Journey into Mystery #103 |
| Enchantress | 1964-04 | Stan Lee, Jack Kirby | Journey into Mystery #103 |
| Enforcers | 1964-04 | Stan Lee, Steve Ditko | The Amazing Spider-Man #10 |
| Executioner (Skurge) | 1964-04 | Stan Lee, Jack Kirby | Journey into Mystery #103 |
| Fancy Dan | 1964-04 | Stan Lee, Steve Ditko | The Amazing Spider-Man #10 |
| Fixer | 1964-04 | Stan Lee, Bill Everett | Daredevil #1 |
| Foggy Nelson | 1964-04 | Stan Lee, Bill Everett | Daredevil #1 |
| Frederick Foswell (Big Man) | 1964-04 | Stan Lee, Steve Ditko | The Amazing Spider-Man #10 |
| Karen Page | 1964-04 | Stan Lee, Bill Everett | Daredevil #1 |
| Montana | 1964-04 | Stan Lee, Steve Ditko | The Amazing Spider-Man #10 |
| Ox | 1964-04 | Stan Lee, Steve Ditko | The Amazing Spider-Man #10 |
| John Grey | 1964-05 | Stan Lee, Jack Kirby | X-Men #5 |
| Grizzly (Ace Fenton) | 1964-06 | Stan Lee, Dick Ayers | Rawhide Kid (vol. 4) #40 |
| Magician | 1964-06 | Stan Lee, Dick Ayers | Tales to Astonish #56 |
| Mysterio | 1964-06 | Stan Lee, Steve Ditko | The Amazing Spider-Man #13 |
| Green Goblin | 1964-07 | Stan Lee, Steve Ditko | The Amazing Spider-Man #14 |
| Heinrich Zemo | 1964-07 | Stan Lee, Jack Kirby | Avengers #6 (Note: Zemo's hand appeared previously in Avengers #4 (March 1964), but he was not seen or identified by name.) |
| Hurricane (Harry Kane) | 1964-07 | Stan Lee, Dick Ayers | Two-Gun Kid #70 |
| Masters of Evil | 1964-07 | Stan Lee, Jack Kirby | Avengers #6 |
| Pinky Pinkerton | 1964-07 | Stan Lee, Jack Kirby | Sgt. Fury and his Howling Commandos #8 |
| Anna Watson | 1964-08 | Stan Lee, Steve Ditko | Amazing Spider-Man #15 |
| Beetle | 1964-08 | Stan Lee, Carl Burgos | Strange Tales #123 |
| Grey Gargoyle | 1964-08 | Stan Lee, Jack Kirby | Journey into Mystery #107 |
| Karnilla | 1964-08 | Stan Lee, Jack Kirby | Journey into Mystery #107 |
| Kraven the Hunter (Sergei Kravinoff) | 1964-08 | Stan Lee, Steve Ditko | The Amazing Spider-Man #15 |
| Owl | 1964-08 | Stan Lee, Joe Orlando | Daredevil #3 |
| Unicorn | 1964-08 | Stan Lee, Don Heck | Tales of Suspense #56 |
| Cerebro | 1964-09 | Stan Lee, Jack Kirby | X-Men #7 |
| Diablo | 1964-09 | Stan Lee, Jack Kirby | Fantastic Four #30 |
| Hawkeye (Clint Barton) | 1964-09 | Stan Lee, Don Heck | Tales of Suspense #57 |
| Kang the Conqueror | 1964-09 | Stan Lee, Jack Kirby | Avengers #8 (Note: Kang first appeared in the identity of Rama-Tut in Fantastic Four #19 (Oct. 1963).) |
| Latveria | 1964-09 | Stan Lee, Jack Kirby | Fantastic Four Annual #2 |
| Franklin Storm | 1964-10 | Stan Lee, Jack Kirby | Fantastic Four #31 |
| Purple Man | 1964-10 | Stan Lee, Joe Orlando | Daredevil #4 |
| Wonder Man | 1964-10 | Stan Lee, Jack Kirby, Don Heck | Avengers #9 |
| Clea Strange | 1964-11 | Stan Lee, Steve Ditko | Strange Tales #126 |
| Dormammu | 1964-11 | Stan Lee, Steve Ditko | Strange Tales #126 |
| Edwin Jarvis | 1964-11 | Stan Lee, Don Heck | Tales of Suspense #59 |
| Glenn Talbot | 1964-11 | Stan Lee, Steve Ditko | Tales to Astonish #61 |
| Immortus | 1964-11 | Stan Lee, Jack Kirby | Avengers #10 |
| Morrat | 1964-11 | Stan Lee, Jack Kirby | Fantastic Four #32 |
| Ned Leeds | 1964-11 | Stan Lee, Steve Ditko | The Amazing Spider-Man #18 |
| Unus the Untouchable | 1964-11 | Stan Lee, Jack Kirby | X-Men #8 |
| Attuma | 1964-12 | Stan Lee, Jack Kirby | Fantastic Four #33 |
| Leader | 1964-12 | Stan Lee, Steve Ditko | Tales to Astonish #62 |
| Matador | 1964-12 | Stan Lee, Wally Wood | Daredevil #5 |
| Mindless Ones | 1964-12 | Stan Lee, Steve Ditko | Strange Tales #127 |
| Farley Stillwell | 1965-01 | Stan Lee, Steve Ditko | The Amazing Spider-Man #20 |
| Laufey | 1965-01 | Stan Lee, Jack Kirby | Journey into Mystery #112 |
| Scorpion | 1965-01 | Stan Lee, Steve Ditko | The Amazing Spider-Man #20 (Note: Scorpion's alter ego Mac Gargan first appeared in the previous issue, The Amazing Spider-Man #19 (Dec. 1964).) |
| Count Nefaria | 1965-02 | Stan Lee, Don Heck | Avengers #13 |
| Dragon Man | 1965-02 | Stan Lee, Jack Kirby | Fantastic Four #35 |
| Maggia (organization) | 1965-02 | Stan Lee, Don Heck | Avengers #13 |
| Mister Fear | 1965-02 | Stan Lee, Wally Wood | Daredevil #6 |
| Tiboro | 1965-02 | Stan Lee, Steve Ditko | Strange Tales #129 |
| Absorbing Man | 1965-03 | Stan Lee, Jack Kirby | Journey into Mystery #114 |
| Chester Phillips | 1965-03 | Stan Lee, Jack Kirby | Tales of Suspense #63 |
| Fenris | 1965-03 | Stan Lee, Jack Kirby | Journey into Mystery #114 |
| Frightful Four | 1965-03 | Stan Lee, Jack Kirby | Fantastic Four #36 |
| Ka-Zar (Kevin Plunder) | 1965-03 | Stan Lee, Jack Kirby | X-Men #10 |
| Kaecilius | 1965-03 | Stan Lee, Steve Ditko | Strange Tales #130 |
| Medusa | 1965-03 | Stan Lee, Jack Kirby | Fantastic Four #36 |
| Princess Python | 1965-03 | Stan Lee, Steve Ditko | The Amazing Spider-Man #22 |
| Savage Land | 1965-03 | Stan Lee, Jack Kirby | X-Men #10 |
| Zabu | 1965-03 | Stan Lee, Jack Kirby | X-Men #10 |
| Anelle | 1965-04 | Stan Lee, Jack Kirby | Fantastic Four #37 |
| Norn Stones | 1965-05 | Stan Lee, Jack Kirby | Journey into Mystery #116 |
| Stranger | 1965-05 | Stan Lee, Jack Kirby | X-Men #11 |
| Mary Jane Watson | 1965-06 | Stan Lee, Steve Ditko, John Romita Sr. | The Amazing Spider-Man #25 |
| Spencer Smythe | 1965-06 | Stan Lee, Steve Ditko | The Amazing Spider-Man #25 |
| Spider-Slayers | 1965-06 | Stan Lee, Steve Ditko | The Amazing Spider-Man #25 |
| Stilt-Man | 1965-06 | Wally Wood | Daredevil #8 |
| Crime Master | 1965-07 | Stan Lee, Steve Ditko | The Amazing Spider-Man #26 |
| Destroyer | 1965-07 | Stan Lee, Jack Kirby | Journey into Mystery #118 |
| Juggernaut | 1965-07 | Stan Lee, Jack Kirby | X-Men #12 |
| Fandral | 1965-08 | Stan Lee, Jack Kirby | Journey into Mystery #119 |
| Helicarrier | 1965-08 | Stan Lee, Jack Kirby | Strange Tales #135 |
| Hogun | 1965-08 | Stan Lee, Jack Kirby | Journey into Mystery #119 |
| Hydra | 1965-08 | Stan Lee, Jack Kirby | Strange Tales #135 |
| Life Model Decoys | 1965-08 | Stan Lee, Jack Kirby | Strange Tales #135 |
| Morgan Stark | 1965-08 | Don Heck, Al Hartley | Tales of Suspense #68 |
| Neptune (Poseidon) | 1965-08 | Stan Lee, Gene Colan | Tales to Astonish #70 |
| S.H.I.E.L.D. | 1965-08 | Stan Lee, Jack Kirby | Strange Tales #135 |
| Swordsman | 1965-08 | Stan Lee, Don Heck | Avengers #19 |
| Volstagg | 1965-08 | Stan Lee, Jack Kirby | Journey into Mystery #119 |
| Warriors Three | 1965-08 | Stan Lee, Jack Kirby | Journey into Mystery #119 (Note: The trio is not referred to as the Warriors Three until Thor #244 (Feb. 1976).) |
| Hildegund | 1965-09 | Stan Lee, Jack Kirby | Journey into Mystery #120 |
| Molten Man | 1965-09 | Stan Lee, Steve Ditko | The Amazing Spider-Man #28 |
| Titanium Man | 1965-09 | Stan Lee, Don Heck | Tales of Suspense #69 |
| Ani-Men | 1965-10 | Stan Lee, Bob Powell, Wally Wood | Daredevil #10 |
| Cat-Man | 1965-10 | Stan Lee, Bob Powell, Wally Wood | Daredevil #10 |
| Frog-Man | 1965-10 | Stan Lee, Bob Powell, Wally Wood | Daredevil #10 |
| Hercules | 1965-10 | Stan Lee, Jack Kirby | Journey into Mystery Annual #1 |
| Power Man (Erik Josten) | 1965-10 | Stan Lee, Don Heck | Avengers #21 |
| Olympians | 1965-11 | Stan Lee, Jack Kirby | Journey into Mystery Annual #1 |
| Bolivar Trask | 1965-11 | Stan Lee, Jack Kirby | X-Men #14 |
| Eternity | 1965-11 | Stan Lee, Steve Ditko | Strange Tales #138 |
| Gorgon (Inhuman) | 1965-11 | Stan Lee, Jack Kirby | Fantastic Four #44 |
| Sentinels | 1965-11 | Stan Lee, Jack Kirby | X-Men #14 |
| Black Bolt | 1965-12 | Stan Lee, Jack Kirby | Fantastic Four #45 |
| Crystal | 1965-12 | Stan Lee, Jack Kirby | Fantastic Four #45 |
| Empire State University | 1965-12 | Stan Lee, Steve Ditko | The Amazing Spider-Man #31 |
| Gwen Stacy | 1965-12 | Stan Lee, Steve Ditko | The Amazing Spider-Man #31 |
| Harry Osborn | 1965-12 | Stan Lee, Steve Ditko | The Amazing Spider-Man #31 |
| Inhumans | 1965-12 | Stan Lee, Jack Kirby | Fantastic Four #45 |
| Karnak | 1965-12 | Stan Lee, Jack Kirby | Fantastic Four #45 |
| Lockjaw | 1965-12 | Stan Lee, Jack Kirby | Fantastic Four #45 |
| Master Mold | 1965-12 | Stan Lee, Jack Kirby | X-Men #15 |
| Ravonna | 1965-12 | Stan Lee, Don Heck | Avengers #23 |
| Triton | 1965-12 | Stan Lee, Jack Kirby | Fantastic Four #45 |
| Eric Koenig | 1966-02 | Stan Lee, Dick Ayers | Sgt. Fury and his Howling Commandos #27 |
| Freak (Happy Hogan) | 1966-02 | | Tales of Suspense #74 (Note: Happy Hogan first appeared in Tales of Suspense #45 (Sept. 1963).) |
| Maximus | 1966-02 | Stan Lee, Jack Kirby | Fantastic Four #47 |
| Mentallo | 1966-02 | Stan Lee, Jack Kirby | Strange Tales #141 |
| Plunderer | 1966-02 | Stan Lee, Jack Kirby | Daredevil #13 |
| Vibranium | 1966-02 | Stan Lee, Jack Kirby | Daredevil #13 |
| Batroc the Leaper | 1966-03 | Stan Lee, Jack Kirby | Tales of Suspense #75 |
| Galactus | 1966-03 | Jack Kirby | Fantastic Four #48 |
| Silver Surfer | 1966-03 | Jack Kirby | Fantastic Four #48 |
| Sharon Carter | 1966-03 | Stan Lee, Jack Kirby | Tales of Suspense #75 |
| Hippolyta | 1966-04 | Stan Lee, Jack Kirby | Thor #127 |
| Mimic | 1966-04 | Stan Lee, Werner Roth | X-Men #19 |
| Pluto | 1966-04 | Stan Lee, Jack Kirby | Thor #127 |
| Ultimo | 1966-04 | Stan Lee, Gene Colan | Tales of Suspense #76 |
| Collector | 1966-05 | Stan Lee, Jack Kirby | Avengers #28 |
| Dredmund Druid | 1966-05 | Stan Lee, Jack Kirby | Strange Tales #144 |
| Goliath | 1966-05 | Stan Lee, Jack Kirby | Avengers #28 |
| Jasper Sitwell | 1966-05 | Stan Lee, Jack Kirby | Strange Tales #144 |
| Masked Marauder | 1966-05 | Stan Lee, John Romita Sr., Frank Giacoia | Daredevil #16 |
| Peggy Carter | 1966-05 | Stan Lee, Jack Kirby | Tales of Suspense #77 |
| Wyatt Wingfoot | 1966-05 | Stan Lee, Jack Kirby | Fantastic Four #50 |
| Ultimate Nullifier | 1966-06 | Stan Lee, Jack Kirby | Fantastic Four #50 |
| Ares | 1966-06 | Stan Lee, Jack Kirby | Thor #129 |
| Artemis | 1966-06 | Stan Lee, Jack Kirby | Thor #129 |
| Hephaestus | 1966-06 | Stan Lee, Jack Kirby | Thor #129 |
| Hera | 1966-06 | Stan Lee, Jack Kirby | Thor #129 |
| Hermes | 1966-06 | Stan Lee, Jack Kirby | Thor #129 |
| Mendel Stromm | 1966-06 | Stan Lee, Steve Ditko | The Amazing Spider-Man #37 |
| Mister Rasputin | 1966-06 | Dennis O'Neill, Steve Ditko | Strange Tales #145 |
| Negative Zone | 1966-06 | Stan Lee, Jack Kirby | Fantastic Four #51 |
| Norman Osborn | 1966-06 | Stan Lee, Steve Ditko | The Amazing Spider-Man #37 (Note: Norman's alter ego Green Goblin previously appeared in The Amazing Spider-Man #14 (July 1964).) |
| Tana Nile | 1966-06 | Stan Lee, Jack Kirby | Thor #129 |
| Advanced Idea Mechanics (A.I.M.) | 1966-07 | Stan Lee, Jack Kirby | Strange Tales #146 |
| Black Panther | 1966-07 | Stan Lee, Jack Kirby | Fantastic Four #52 |
| Boomerang | 1966-07 | Stan Lee, Jack Kirby | Tales to Astonish #81 |
| Cosmic Cube | 1966-07 | Stan Lee, Jack Kirby | Tales of Suspense #79 |
| Crusher | 1966-07 | Stan Lee, Jack Kirby | Thor #130 |
| Gladiator (Melvin Potter) | 1966-07 | Stan Lee, John Romita Sr. | Daredevil #18 |
| Kubik | 1966-07 | Stan Lee, Jack Kirby, Ralph Macchio | Tales of Suspense #79 |
| T'Chaka | 1966-07 | Stan Lee, Jack Kirby | Fantastic Four #53 |
| Wakanda | 1966-07 | Stan Lee, Jack Kirby | Fantastic Four #52 |
| Kaluu | 1966-08 | Stan Lee, Dennis O'Neill, Bill Everett | Strange Tales #147 |
| Klaw | 1966-08 | Stan Lee, Jack Kirby | Fantastic Four #53 |
| Avalon (Otherworld) | 1966-08 | Stan Lee, Jack Kirby | Fantastic Four #54 (Note: First referred to as Otherworld in Captain Britain vol. 2 #1 (Oct. 1976).) |
| Bill Foster | 1966-09 | Stan Lee, Don Heck | Avengers #32 |
| Ego the Living Planet | 1966-09 | Stan Lee, Jack Kirby | Mighty Thor #132 |
| Locust | 1966-09 | Roy Thomas, Werner Roth | X-Men #24 |
| Prester John | 1966-09 | Stan Lee, Jack Kirby | Fantastic Four #54 |
| Recorders | 1966-09 | Stan Lee, Jack Kirby | Thor #132 |
| Rhino | 1966-10 | Stan Lee, John Romita Sr. | The Amazing Spider-Man #41 |
| Super-Adaptoid | 1966-10 | Stan Lee, Gene Colan, Jack Kirby | Tales of Suspense #82 |
| Valkyrior | 1966-10 | Stan Lee, Jack Kirby | Thor #133 |
| Fafnir | 1966-11 | Stan Lee, Jack Kirby | Thor #134 |
| High Evolutionary | 1966-11 | Stan Lee, Jack Kirby | Mighty Thor #134 (Note: The High Evolutionary was first mentioned in the previous issue, Mighty Thor #133 (October 1966).) |
| Living Laser | 1966-11 | Stan Lee, Art Simek, Don Heck | Avengers #34 |
| Man-Beast | 1966-11 | Stan Lee, Jack Kirby | Mighty Thor #134 (Note: First called "Super-Beast", not called Man-Beast until Mighty Thor #135 (Dec. 1966).) |
| New Men | 1966-11 | Stan Lee, Jack Kirby | Mighty Thor #134 |
| Quasimodo | 1966-11 | Stan Lee, Jack Kirby | Fantastic Four Annual #6 |
| Tumbler | 1966-11 | Stan Lee, Jack Kirby | Tales of Suspense #83 |
| Umar | 1966-11 | Roy Thomas, Bill Everett | Strange Tales #150 |
| Banshee | 1967-01 | Roy Thomas, Werner Roth | X-Men #28 |
| Factor Three | 1967-01 | Roy Thomas, Werner Roth | X-Men #28 |
| Jim Morita | 1967-01 | Roy Thomas, Dick Ayers | Sgt. Fury and his Howling Commandos #38 |
| Ogre | 1967-01 | Roy Thomas, Werner Roth | X-Men #28 |
| Transia | 1967-01 | | Avengers #36 (Note: First named appearance, though probably appears in earlier issues unidentified.) |
| Mogul of the Mystic Mountain | 1967-02 | Stan Lee, Jack Kirby | Thor #137 |
| Leap-Frog | 1967-02 | Stan Lee, Gene Colan, Frank Giacoia | Daredevil #25 |
| Phantom Rider | 1967-02 | Gary Friedrich, Roy Thomas, Dick Ayers | Ghost Rider #1 |
| Ulik | 1967-02 | Stan Lee, Jack Kirby | Thor #137 |
| Dreadnoughts | 1967-03 | Roy Thomas, Jim Steranko | Strange Tales #154 |
| Shocker | 1967-03 | Stan Lee, John Romita Sr. | The Amazing Spider-Man #46 |
| Abomination | 1967-04 | Stan Lee, Gil Kane | Tales to Astonish #90 |
| Cobalt Man | 1967-04 | Roy Thomas, Werner Roth | X-Men #31 |
| Blastaar | 1967-05 | Stan Lee, Jack Kirby | Fantastic Four #67 |
| Candy Southern | 1967-05 | Roy Thomas, Werner Roth | X-Men #31 |
| Growing Man | 1967-05 | Stan Lee, Jack Kirby | Thor #140 |
| Zom | 1967-05 | Stan Lee, Marie Severin | Strange Tales #156 |
| Living Tribunal | 1967-06 | Stan Lee, Marie Severin, Herb Trimpe | Strange Tales #157 |
| Kingpin | 1967-07 | Stan Lee, John Romita Sr. | The Amazing Spider-Man #50 |
| Kraken | 1967-07 | Roy Thomas, Dan Adkins | Tales to Astonish #93 (Note: A giant octopus appears earlier, in Avengers #27 (April 1966), but is not identified as a kraken.) |
| Changeling | 1967-08 | Roy Thomas, Werner Roth | X-Men #35 |
| Enchanters Three | 1967-08 | Stan Lee, Jack Kirby | Thor #143 |
| Forbush Man | 1967-08 | Stan Lee, Jack Kirby | Not Brand Echh #1 (Note: Alter ego Irving Forbush had appeared first in Snafu #1 (Nov. 1955).) |
| Kree | 1967-08 | Stan Lee, Jack Kirby | Fantastic Four #65 |
| Red Guardian | 1967-08 | Roy Thomas, John Buscema | Avengers #43 |
| Robbie Robertson | 1967-08 | Stan Lee, John Romita Sr. | The Amazing Spider-Man #51 |
| Ronan the Accuser | 1967-08 | Stan Lee, Jack Kirby | Fantastic Four #65 |
| Supreme Intelligence | 1967-08 | Stan Lee, Jack Kirby | Fantastic Four #65 |
| Valentina Allegra de Fontaine | 1967-08 | Jim Steranko | Strange Tales #159 |
| Emissaries of Evil | 1967-09 | Stan Lee, Gene Colan, John Tartaglione | Daredevil Annual #1 |
| Enclave | 1967-09 | Stan Lee, Jack Kirby | Fantastic Four #66 |
| MODOK | 1967-09 | Stan Lee, Jack Kirby | Tales of Suspense #93 |
| Mutant Master | 1967-10 | Roy Thomas, Ross Andru | X-Men #37 (Note: First mentioned behind-the-scenes in X-Men #26 (Nov. 1966).) |
| Live Wire | 1967-11 | Stan Lee, Jack Kirby | Fantastic Four Annual #5 |
| Psycho-Man | 1967-11 | Stan Lee, Jack Kirby | Fantastic Four Annual #5 |
| Black Knight (Dane Whitman) | 1967-12 | Roy Thomas, John Verpoorten, George Tuska | Avengers #47 |
| Captain Marvel (Mar-Vell) | 1967-12 | Stan Lee, Gene Colan | Marvel Super-Heroes #12 |
| Clay Quartermain | 1967-12 | Jim Steranko | Strange Tales #163 |
| Living Diamond | 1967-12 | Roy Thomas, Werner Roth | X-Men #39 |
| Aragorn | 1968-01 | Roy Thomas, George Tuska | Avengers #48 |
| Captain Savage | 1968-01 | Gary Friedrich, Dick Ayers | Captain Savage and his Leatherneck Raiders #1 |
| George Stacy | 1968-01 | Stan Lee, John Romita Sr., Don Heck | The Amazing Spider-Man #56 |
| Leatherneck Raiders | 1968-01 | Gary Friedrich, Dick Ayers | Captain Savage and his Leatherneck Raiders #1 |
| Rynda | 1968-01 | Stan Lee, Jack Kirby | Thor #148 |
| Scientist Supreme (Yandroth) | 1968-01 | Jim Lawrence, Dan Adkins | Strange Tales #164 |
| Whiplash (Blacklash) | 1968-01 | Stan Lee, Gene Colan | Tales of Suspense #97 |
| Wrecker | 1968-01 | Stan Lee, Jack Kirby | Mighty Thor #148 |
| Grotesk | 1968-02 | Roy Thomas, Don Heck | X-Men #41 |
| ISAAC | 1968-02 | Jim Starlin, Mike Friedrich | Iron Man #55 |
| Madame Masque | 1968-02 | Stan Lee, Gene Colan | Tales of Suspense #98 |
| Typhon | 1968-02 | Roy Thomas, John Buscema | Avengers #49 |
| Carol Danvers | 1968-03 | Roy Thomas, Gene Colan | Marvel Super-Heroes #13 |
| Grim Reaper | 1968-05 | Roy Thomas, John Buscema | Avengers #52 |
| Sleeper (robot) | 1968-05 | Stan Lee, Jack Kirby | Captain America #101 |
| Centurius | 1968-07 | Jim Steranko, Frank Giacoia | Nick Fury, Agent of S.H.I.E.L.D. #2 |
| Jester | 1968-07 | Stan Lee, Gene Colan | Daredevil #42 |
| Mangog | 1968-07 | Stan Lee, Jack Kirby | Thor #154 |
| Missing Link | 1968-07 | Bill Everett, Roy Thomas, Marie Severin | Incredible Hulk #105 |
| Ultron | 1968-07 | Roy Thomas, John Buscema | Avengers #54 |
| Shalla-Bal | 1968-08 | Stan Lee, John Buscema | Silver Surfer #1 |
| Phantom Eagle | 1968-09 | Gary Friedrich, Herb Trimpe | Marvel Super-Heroes #16 |
| Tiger Shark | 1968-09 | Roy Thomas, John Buscema | Sub-Mariner #5 |
| Badoon | 1968-10 | Stan Lee, John Buscema | Silver Surfer #2 |
| Mesmero | 1968-10 | Arnold Drake, Don Heck, Werner Roth | X-Men #49 |
| Polaris | 1968-10 | Arnold Drake, Don Heck | X-Men #49 |
| Vision | 1968-10 | Roy Thomas, John Buscema | Avengers #57 |
| Annihilus | 1968-11 | Stan Lee, Jack Kirby | Fantastic Four Annual #6 |
| Doctor Faustus | 1968-11 | Stan Lee, Jack Kirby | Captain America #107 |
| Franklin Richards | 1968-11 | Stan Lee, Jack Kirby | Fantastic Four Annual #6 |
| Richard and Mary Parker | 1968-11 | Stan Lee, Larry Lieber | Amazing Spider-Man Annual #5 |
| Satannish | 1968-11 | Roy Thomas, Gene Colan | Doctor Strange #174 |
| Mephisto | 1968-12 | Stan Lee, John Buscema | Silver Surfer #3 |
| Randy Robertson | 1968-12 | Stan Lee, John Romita Sr. | The Amazing Spider-Man #67 |
| Sons of Satannish | 1968-12 | Roy Thomas, Gene Colan | Doctor Strange #175 |
| Yellowjacket (Hank Pym) | 1968-12 | John Buscema, Roy Thomas | Avengers #59 |
| Charlie-27 | 1969-01 | Arnold Drake, Stan Lee, Gene Colan | Marvel Super-Heroes #18 |
| Galaxy Master | 1969-01 | Stan Lee, Herb Trimpe | Incredible Hulk #111 |
| Guardians of the Galaxy | 1969-01 | Arnold Drake, Stan Lee, Gene Colan | Marvel Super-Heroes #18 |
| Karthon the Quester | 1969-01 | Roy Thomas, Marie Severin | Sub-Mariner #9 |
| Martinex | 1969-01 | Arnold Drake, Stan Lee, Gene Colan | Marvel Super-Heroes #18 |
| Naga | 1969-01 | Roy Thomas, Marie Severin | Sub-Mariner #9 |
| Serpent Crown | 1969-01 | Roy Thomas, Marie Severin | Sub-Mariner #9 |
| Vance Astro | 1969-01 | Arnold Drake, Stan Lee, Gene Colan | Marvel Super-Heroes #18 |
| Yondu | 1969-01 | Arnold Drake, Stan Lee, Gene Colan | Marvel Super-Heroes #18 |
| Quinjet | 1969-02 | | Avengers #61 |
| Viper (Madame Hydra) | 1969-02 | Jim Steranko | Captain America #110 |
| Havok | 1969-03 | Arnold Drake, Don Heck, Neal Adams | X-Men #54 |
| Living Monolith | 1969-03 | Arnold Drake, Don Heck | X-Men #54 (Note: First appeared as Living Pharaoh, he was not called Living Monolith until X-Men #56 (May 1969).) |
| Man-Ape | 1969-03 | Roy Thomas, John Buscema | Avengers #62 |
| Vanessa Fisk | 1969-03 | Stan Lee, John Romita Sr. | The Amazing Spider-Man #70 |
| W'Kabi | 1969-03 | Roy Thomas, John Buscema | Avengers #62 |
| Controller | 1969-04 | Archie Goodwin, George Tuska | Iron Man #12 |
| Athena | 1969-05 | Stan Lee, Jack Kirby | Thor #164 |
| Barney Barton (Trickshot) | 1969-05 | Roy Thomas, Gene Colan | Avengers #64 |
| Larry Trask | 1969-06 | Roy Thomas, Neal Adams | X-Men #57 |
| Man Mountain Marko | 1969-06 | Stan Lee, John Buscema | The Amazing Spider-Man #73 |
| Silvermane | 1969-06 | Stan Lee, John Buscema | The Amazing Spider-Man #73 |
| Adamantium | 1969-07 | Roy Thomas, Barry Windsor-Smith, Syd Shores | Avengers #66 |
| Super-Patriot | 1969-07 | Gary Friedrich, Herb Trimpe | Nick Fury, Agent of S.H.I.E.L.D. #13 |
| Digger | 1969-09 | Jim Steranko | Tower of Shadows #1 |
| Falcon | 1969-09 | Stan Lee, Gene Colan | Captain America #117 |
| Midas | 1969-09 | Archie Goodwin, George Tuska | Iron Man #17 |
| Redwing | 1969-09 | Stan Lee, Gene Colan | Captain America #117 |
| Sauron | 1969-09 | Roy Thomas, Neal Adams | X-Men #60 |
| Doctor Spectrum | 1969-10 | Roy Thomas, Sal Buscema | Avengers #69 |
| Grandmaster | 1969-10 | Roy Thomas, Sal Buscema | Avengers #69 |
| Hyperion | 1969-10 | Roy Thomas, Sal Buscema | Avengers #69 |
| Nighthawk | 1969-10 | Roy Thomas, Sal Buscema | Avengers #69 |
| Speed Demon (Whizzer) | 1969-10 | Roy Thomas, Sal Buscema | Avengers #69 |
| Squadron Sinister | 1969-10 | Roy Thomas, Sal Buscema | Avengers #69 |
| Torgo | 1969-10 | Stan Lee, Jack Kirby | Fantastic Four #91 |
| Brainchild | 1969-11 | Roy Thomas, Neal Adams | X-Men #62 |
| Glob | 1969-11 | Roy Thomas, Herb Trimpe | Incredible Hulk (vol. 2) #121 |
| Lorelei (mutate) | 1969-11 | Roy Thomas, Neal Adams | X-Men #62 |
| Prowler | 1969-11 | Stan Lee, John Buscema, Jim Mooney | Amazing Spider-Man #78 |
| Savage Land Mutates | 1969-11 | Roy Thomas, Neal Adams | X-Men #62 |
| Stingray | 1969-11 | Roy Thomas, Marie Severin | Sub-Mariner #19 (Note: Stingray's alter ego Walter Newell first appeared in Tales to Astonish #67 (Sept. 1967).) |
| Undying Ones | 1969-11 | Roy Thomas, Gene Colan | Doctor Strange #183 |
| Invaders | 1969-12 | Roy Thomas, Sal Buscema, Bill Finger, Martin Goodman | Avengers #71 |
| Agatha Harkness | 1970-01 | Stan Lee, Jack Kirby | Fantastic Four #94 |
| Aquarius | 1970-01 | Roy Thomas, Sal Buscema | Avengers #72 |
| Aries | 1970-01 | Roy Thomas, Sal Buscema | Avengers #72 |
| Cancer | 1970-01 | Roy Thomas, Sal Buscema | Avengers #72 |
| Capricorn | 1970-01 | Roy Thomas, Sal Buscema | Avengers #72 |
| Gemini | 1970-01 | Roy Thomas, Sal Buscema | Avengers #72 |
| Leo | 1970-01 | Roy Thomas, Sal Buscema | Avengers #72 |
| Libra | 1970-01 | Roy Thomas, Sal Buscema | Avengers #72 |
| Pisces | 1970-01 | Roy Thomas, Sal Buscema | Avengers #72 |
| Sagittarius | 1970-01 | Roy Thomas, Sal Buscema | Avengers #72 |
| Scorpio | 1970-01 | Roy Thomas, Sal Buscema | Avengers #72 |
| Sunfire | 1970-01 | Roy Thomas, Don Heck | X-Men #64 |
| Taurus | 1970-01 | Roy Thomas, Sal Buscema | Avengers #72 |
| Virgo | 1970-01 | Roy Thomas, Sal Buscema | Avengers #72 |
| Zodiac | 1970-01 | Roy Thomas, Sal Buscema | Avengers #72 |
| Doomsday Man | 1970-02 | Stan Lee, John Buscema | Silver Surfer #13 |
| Kangaroo | 1970-02 | Stan Lee, John Buscema, Jim Mooney, John Romita Sr. | The Amazing Spider-Man #81 |
| Mother Night | 1970-03 | Stan Lee, Gene Colan | Captain America #123 |
| Orka | 1970-03 | Roy Thomas, Marie Severin | Sub-Mariner #23 |
| Arkon | 1970-04 | Roy Thomas, John Buscema | Avengers #75 |
| Minotaur (Myklos Vryolak) | 1970-04 | Archie Goodwin, Johnny Craig | Iron Man #24 |
| Richard Fisk | 1970-04 | Stan Lee, John Romita Sr. | The Amazing Spider-Man #83 |
| Starr the Slayer | 1970-04 | Roy Thomas, Barry Windsor-Smith | Chamber of Darkness #4 |
| Yeti | 1970-06 | Stan Lee, Jack Kirby | Fantastic Four #99 |
| Commander Kraken | 1970-07 | Roy Thomas, Sal Buscema | Sub-Mariner #27 |
| Firebrand | 1970-07 | Archie Goodwin, Don Heck | Iron Man #27 |
| Lethal Legion | 1970-07 | | Avengers #78 |
| Hebe | 1970-08 | Allyn Brodsky, Frank Springer | Ka-Zar #1 |
| Howard Stark | 1970-08 | Archie Goodwin, Don Heck | Iron Man #28 |
| Huntsman (Cephalus) | 1970-08 | Allyn Brodsky, Frank Springer | Ka-Zar #1 |
| Jim Wilson | 1970-09 | Roy Thomas, Herb Trimpe | Incredible Hulk (vol. 2) #131 |
| Red Wolf | 1970-09 | Roy Thomas, John Buscema | Avengers #80 |
| Conan | 1970-10 | Roy Thomas, Barry Windsor-Smith | Conan the Barbarian #1 (Note: Based on Robert E. Howard's Conan the Barbarian, who first appeared in Weird Tales in 1932.) |
| Kull (the Conqueror) | 1970-10 | Roy Thomas, Barry Windsor-Smith | Conan the Barbarian #1 (Note: Based on Robert E. Howard's Kull of Atlantis, who first appeared in Weird Tales in 1932.) |
| Thunderbolt | 1970-10 | Roy Thomas, Gene Colan, Syd Shores | Daredevil #69 |
| Turk Barrett | 1970-10 | Roy Thomas, Gene Colan | Daredevil #69 |
| Garokk | 1970-11 | Roy Thomas, Jack Kirby | Astonishing Tales #2 |
| Guardsman | 1970-11 | Allyn Brodsky, Don Heck | Iron Man #31 |
| Llyra | 1970-12 | Roy Thomas, Sal Buscema | Sub-Mariner #32 |
| Llyron | 1970-12 | Roy Thomas, Sal Buscema | Sub-Mariner #32 |
| Valkyrie | 1970-12 | Roy Thomas, John Buscema | Avengers #83 |
| Zaladane | 1970-12 | Gerry Conway, Barry Windsor-Smith | Astonishing Tales #3 |
| Scientist Supreme (A.I.M.) | 1971-01 | Stan Lee, Gene Colan | Captain America #133 |
| Spymaster | 1971-01 | Stan Lee, Allyn Brodsky, Don Heck | Iron Man #33 |
| Golden Archer | 1971-02 | Roy Thomas, Sal Buscema | Avengers #85 |
| Klaatu | 1971-02 | Gerry Conway, Herb Trimpe | Incredible Hulk #136 |
| Lady Lark | 1971-02 | Roy Thomas, Sal Buscema | Avengers #85 |
| Squadron Supreme | 1971-02 | Roy Thomas, Sal Buscema | Avengers #85 |
| Tom Thumb | 1971-02 | Roy Thomas, Sal Buscema | Avengers #85 |
| Ramrod | 1971-04 | Gerry Conway, Don Heck | Iron Man #36 |
| Ellen Brandt | 1971-05 | Roy Thomas, Gerry Conway, Gray Morrow | Savage Tales #1 |
| Femizons | 1971-05 | Stan Lee, John Romita Sr. | Savage Tales #1 |
| Man-Thing | 1971-05 | Roy Thomas, Gerry Conway, Gray Morrow | Savage Tales #1 |
| Psyklop | 1971-05 | Harlan Ellison, Roy Thomas, Sal Buscema, Jim Mooney | Avengers #88 |
| Jarella | 1971-06 | Harlan Ellison, Roy Thomas, Herb Trimpe | Incredible Hulk (vol. 2) #140 |
| Mockingbird | 1971-06 | Len Wein, Neal Adams | Astonishing Tales #6 |
| Doc Samson | 1971-07 | Roy Thomas, Herb Trimpe | Incredible Hulk (vol. 2) #141 |
| Man-Bull | 1971-07 | Gerry Conway, Gary Friedrich | Daredevil #78 |
| White Dragon | 1971-07 | Gerry Conway, Herb Trimpe | Iron Man #39 |
| Overmind | 1971-08 | Stan Lee, John Buscema | Fantastic Four #113 |
| Morbius | 1971-10 | Roy Thomas, Gil Kane | Amazing Spider-Man #101 |
| Defenders | 1971-12 | Roy Thomas, Ross Andru | Marvel Feature #1 |
| Gog | 1971-12 | Roy Thomas, Gil Kane | The Amazing Spider-Man #103 |
| Hildegarde | 1972-01 | Gerry Conway, Sal Buscema | Thor #195 |
| Kulan Gath | 1972-02 | Roy Thomas, Barry Windsor-Smith | Conan the Barbarian #14 |
| Peter Corbeau | 1972-02 | Archie Goodwin, Chris Claremont, Herb Trimpe | Incredible Hulk #148 |
| Werewolf by Night | 1972-02 | Roy Thomas, Gerry Conway, Mike Ploog | Marvel Spotlight #2 |
| Air-Walker | 1972-03 | Stan Lee, John Buscema | Fantastic Four #120 |
| Adam Warlock | 1972-04 | Roy Thomas, Gil Kane | Marvel Premiere #1 |
| Counter-Earth | 1972-04 | | Marvel Premiere #1 |
| Dracula | 1972-04 | Gerry Conway, Gene Colan | Tomb of Dracula #1 (Note: An alternate version of Dracula first appeared in Suspense #7 (Mar. 1951).) |
| Frank Drake | 1972-04 | Gerry Conway, Gene Colan | Tomb of Dracula #1 |
| Infinity Gems | 1972-04 | | Marvel Premiere #1 |
| Comanche | 1972-06 | Archie Goodwin, George Tuska | Luke Cage, Hero for Hire #1 |
| Darkhold | 1972-06 | Gerry Conway, Mike Ploog | Marvel Spotlight #4 |
| Diamondback (Willis Stryker) | 1972-06 | Archie Goodwin, George Tuska | Luke Cage, Hero for Hire #1 |
| Luke Cage | 1972-06 | Archie Goodwin, George Tuska | Luke Cage, Hero for Hire #1 |
| Namorita | 1972-06 | Bill Everett | Sub-Mariner #50 |
| Noah Burstein | 1972-06 | Archie Goodwin, George Tuska | Luke Cage, Hero for Hire #1 |
| Shades | 1972-06 | Archie Goodwin, George Tuska | Luke Cage, Hero for Hire #1 |
| Gibbon | 1972-07 | Stan Lee, John Romita Sr. | The Amazing Spider-Man #110 |
| Rachel van Helsing | 1972-07 | Archie Goodwin, Gene Colan | Tomb of Dracula #3 |
| Claire Temple | 1972-08 | Archie Goodwin, George Tuska | Luke Cage, Hero for Hire #2 |
| David Griffith | 1972-08 | Archie Goodwin, George Tuska | Heroes for Hire #2 |
| Dragon Lord | 1972-08 | Bill Everett, Mike Friedrich | Sub-Mariner #52 |
| Ghost Rider (Johnny Blaze) | 1972-08 | Roy Thomas, Gary Friedrich, Mike Ploog | Marvel Spotlight #5 |
| Zarathos | 1972-08 | Roy Thomas, Gary Friedrich, Mike Ploog | Marvel Spotlight #5 |
| Captain America (William Burnside) | 1972-09 | Steve Englehart, Sal Buscema | Captain America #153 (Note: Retcon: Captain America stories from Young Men #24 (Dec. 1953) through 1964 were later ascribed to Burnside.) |
| Jack Monroe | 1972-09 | Russ Heath | Captain America #153 |
| Shaper of Worlds | 1972-09 | Archie Goodwin, Herb Trimpe | Incredible Hulk #155 |
| Damon Dran | 1972-10 | Gene Colan, Gerry Conway | Daredevil #92 |
| Gideon Mace | 1972-10 | Archie Goodwin, George Tuska | Heroes for Hire #3 |
| Gunhawks | 1972-10 | Gary Friedrich, Syd Shores | Gunhawks #1 |
| Hammerhead | 1972-10 | Gerry Conway, John Romita Sr. | The Amazing Spider-Man #113 |
| Jonas Harrow | 1972-10 | Gerry Conway, John Romita Jr. | The Amazing Spider-Man #114 |
| Agamotto | 1972-11 | Stan Lee, Steve Ditko | Marvel Premiere #5 |
| Griffin | 1972-11 | Steve Englehart, Tom Sutton | Amazing Adventures (vol. 2) #15 |
| Night Nurse | 1972-11 | Jean Thomas, Win Mortimer | Night Nurse #1 (Note: Linda Carter, the original Night Nurse, first appeared in Linda Carter, Student Nurse #1, Sept. 1961.) |
| Shuma-Gorath | 1972-11 | Steve Englehart, Frank Brunner | Marvel Premiere #5 |
| Tigra | 1972-11 | Roy Thomas, Wally Wood, Jenny Blake Isabella, Gil Kane, Don Perlin, John Romita, Sr., Marie Severin | Claws of the Cat #1 |
| Vishanti | 1972-11 | Stan Lee, Gardner Fox, Sam Kweskin | Marvel Premiere #5 (Note: The Vishanti were first mentioned in Strange Tales #115 (Dec. 1963).) |
| Jennifer Kale | 1972-12 | Steve Gerber, Rich Buckler | Adventure into Fear #11 |
| Shanna the She-Devil | 1972-12 | Carole Seuling, George Tuska | Shanna the She-Devil #1 |
| Thog | 1972-12 | Steve Gerber, Rich Buckler | Adventure into Fear #11 |
| Thundra | 1972-12 | Roy Thomas, Gerry Conway | Fantastic Four #129 |
| Humus Sapien | 1973 (preview); 2001-09 (full) | Michael Barreiro, Fabian Nicieza, Patrick Zircher | FOOM #3 (preview) (Note: Initially spelled "Humus Sapiens" in preview.); Thunderbolts #54 (full) |
| Moondragon | 1973-01 | Bill Everett, Mike Friedrich, George Tuska | Iron Man #54 |
| Viper (Jordan Stryke) | 1973-01 | Steve Englehart, Steve Gerber, Sal Buscema, John Verpoorten | Captain America #157 |
| Blood Brothers | 1973-02 | Jim Starlin | Iron Man #55 |
| Drax the Destroyer | 1973-02 | Mike Friedrich, Jim Starlin | Iron Man #55 |
| Kronos | 1973-02 | Jim Starlin | Iron Man #55 |
| Mercurio the 4-D Man | 1973-02 | Gerry Conway, John Buscema | Thor #208 |
| Mentor (A'lars) | 1973-02 | Jim Starlin | Iron Man #55 |
| Red Sonja | 1973-02 | Robert E. Howard, Roy Thomas, Barry Windsor-Smith | Conan the Barbarian #23 |
| Starfox | 1973-02 | Jim Starlin | Iron Man #55 |
| Tamara Rahn | 1973-02 | Bill Everett, Steve Gerber, Sam Kweskin | Sub-Mariner #58 |
| Thanos | 1973-02 | Jim Starlin | Iron Man #55 |
| Quincy Harker | 1973-03 | Marv Wolfman, Gene Colan | Tomb of Dracula #7 |
| Ultimus (Ard-Con) | 1973-03 | Gerry Conway, John Buscema | Thor #209 |
| Man-Killer | 1973-04 | Jim Mooney, Gerry Conway | Marvel Team-Up #8 |
| Wendigo | 1973-04 | Steve Englehart, Herb Trimpe | Incredible Hulk #162 |
| Gremlin | 1973-05 | Steve Englehart, Herb Trimpe | Incredible Hulk #163 |
| Killraven | 1973-05 | Roy Thomas, Neal Adams, Gerry Conway | Amazing Adventures (vol. 2) #18 |
| Solarr | 1973-05 | Steve Englehart, Sal Buscema | Captain America #160 |
| Angar the Screamer | 1973-06 | Steve Gerber, Gene Colan, John Tartaglione | Daredevil #100 |
| Dakimh the Enchanter | 1973-06 | Steve Gerber, Val Mayerik | Adventure into Fear #14 |
| Death | 1973-06 | Mike Friedrich, Jim Starlin | Captain Marvel #26 |
| Mandrill | 1973-06 | Carole Seuling, Ross Andru | Shanna the She-Devil #4 |
| Mantis | 1973-06 | Steve Englehart, Don Heck | Avengers #112 |
| Señor Muerte | 1973-06 | Steve Englehart, George Tuska | Luke Cage, Hero For Hire #10 |
| Victorius | 1973-06 | Mike Friedrich, Dan Adkins | Astonishing Tales #18 |
| Blade | 1973-07 | Marv Wolfman, Gene Colan | Tomb of Dracula #10 |
| Serpent Squad | 1973-07 | Steve Englehart | Captain America #163 |
| Chemistro | 1973-08 | Steve Englehart, George Tuska | Luke Cage, Hero for Hire #12 |
| Moondark | 1973-08 | Gerry Conway, Len Wein, Ross Andru | Marvel Team-Up #12 |
| N'Kantu, the Living Mummy | 1973-08 | Steve Gerber, Rich Buckler | Supernatural Thrillers #5 |
| Nekra | 1973-08 | Steve Gerber, Ross Andru | Shanna the She-Devil #5 |
| Nightshade | 1973-08 | Steve Englehart, Alan Weiss | Captain America #164 |
| Solomon Kane | 1973-08 | Robert E. Howard | Monsters Unleashed #1 (Note: Solomon Kane first appeared in stories in Weird Tales (1928) before being licensed to Marvel.) |
| Zzzax | 1973-08 | Steve Englehart, Herb Trimpe | Incredible Hulk #166 |
| Brother Voodoo (Doctor Voodoo) | 1973-09 | Len Wein, Gene Colan | Strange Tales #169 |
| Daimon Hellstrom | 1973-09 | Gary Friedrich, Tom Sutton | Ghost Rider #1 |
| Daniel Drumm | 1973-09 | Len Wein, Gene Colan | Strange Tales #169 |
| Eon | 1973-09 | Jim Starlin | Captain Marvel #28 |
| Killmonger | 1973-09 | Don McGregor, Rich Buckler | Jungle Action #6 |
| Man-Wolf | 1973-09 | Stan Lee, Steve Ditko, Gerry Conway, Gil Kane, Roy Thomas | Amazing Spider-Man #124 (Note: Alter ego John Jameson first appeared in Amazing Spider-Man #1 (March 1961).) |
| Tatterdemalion | 1973-09 | Tom Sutton | Werewolf by Night #9 |
| Venomm | 1973-09 | Don McGregor, Rich Buckler | Jungle Action #6 |
| Big Ben Donovan | 1973-10 | Steve Englehart, Billy Graham | Luke Cage, Hero for Hire #14 |
| Deacon Frost | 1973-10 | Marv Wolfman, Gene Colan | Tomb of Dracula #13 |
| Hangman | 1973-10 | Marv Wolfman, Gil Kane | Werewolf by Night #11 |
| Satana | 1973-10 | Roy Thomas, John Romita Sr. | Vampire Tales #2 |
| Wundarr the Aquarian | 1973-10 | Steve Gerber, Val Mayerik | Adventure into Fear #17 |
| Bi-Beast | 1973-11 | Steve Englehart, Herb Trimpe | Incredible Hulk #169 |
| Carmilla Frost | 1973-11 | Don McGregor, Herb Trimpe | Amazing Adventures (vol. 2) #21 |
| Orb | 1973-11 | Len Wein, Ross Andru | Marvel Team-Up #15 |
| Basilisk | 1973-12 | Len Wein, Gil Kane | Marvel Team-Up #16 |
| Black Jack Tarr | 1973-12 | Steve Englehart, Jim Starlin | Marvel Special Edition #15 |
| Fu Manchu (Zheng Zu) | 1973-12 | Sax Rohmer, Steve Englehart, Al Milgrom, Jim Starlin | Special Marvel Edition #15 |
| Helmut Zemo | 1973-12 | Jenny Blake Isabella, Sal Buscema | Captain America #168 |
| Howard the Duck | 1973-12 | Steve Gerber, Val Mayerik | Adventure into Fear #19 |
| Shang-Chi | 1973-12 | Steve Englehart, Jim Starlin | Special Marvel Edition #15 |
| Stiletto | 1973-12 | Jenny Blake Isabella, Billy Graham | Luke Cage, Hero For Hire #16 |
| Darkoth | 1974-01 | Gerry Conway, Rich Buckler | Fantastic Four #142 |
| Doctor Sun | 1974-01 | Marv Wolfman, Gene Colan | Tomb of Dracula #16 |
| Force | 1974-01 | Steve Gerber, Don Heck | Sub-Mariner #68 |
| Lloyd Bloch (Moonstone, Nefarius) | 1974-01 | Steve Englehart, Mike Friedrich, Sal Buscema | Captain America #169 |
| Marduk Kurios | 1974-01 | Gary Friedrich, Herb Trimpe | Marvel Spotlight #13 |
| Topaz | 1974-01 | Marv Wolfman, Mike Ploog | Werewolf by Night #13 |
| Jackal | 1974-02 | Stan Lee, Steve Ditko, Gerry Conway, Ross Andru | The Amazing Spider-Man #129 (Note: The Jackal's alter ego Prof. Miles Warren first appeared in The Amazing Spider-Man #31 (Dec. 1965).) |
| Midnight Sun (M'Nai) | 1974-02 | Steve Englehart, Jim Starlin, Al Milgrom | Marvel Special Edition #16 |
| Punisher | 1974-02 | Gerry Conway, Ross Andru | The Amazing Spider-Man #129 |
| Richard Rory | 1974-02 | Steve Gerber, Val Mayerik | Man-Thing #2 |
| Black Spectre (organization) | 1974-03 | Steve Gerber, Bob Brown | Daredevil #108 |
| Foolkiller | 1974-03 | Steve Gerber, Val Mayerik | Man-Thing #3 |
| Black Talon | 1974-04 | Len Wein, Gene Colan | Strange Tales #173 |
| Harold Meachum | 1974-04 | Roy Thomas, Gil Kane | Marvel Premiere #15 |
| Sons of the Tiger | 1974-04 | Gerry Conway, Dick Giordano | The Deadly Hands of Kung Fu #1 |
| Stegron | 1974-04 | Len Wein, Gil Kane | Marvel Team-Up #19 |
| Iron Fist (Danny Rand) | 1974-05 | Roy Thomas, Gil Kane | Marvel Premiere #15 |
| Lei Kung | 1974-05 | Roy Thomas, Gil Kane | Marvel Premiere #15 |
| Nebulon | 1974-05 | Len Wein, Sal Buscema | Defenders #13 |
| Piranha | 1974-05 | Marv Wolfman, George Tuska | Sub-Mariner #70 |
| Yu-Ti (Dragon Lord) | 1974-05 | Roy Thomas, Gil Kane | Marvel Premiere #15 |
| Golem | 1974-06 | Len Wein, John Buscema | Strange Tales #174 |
| Lilith (Dracula's daughter) | 1974-06 | Marv Wolfman, Gene Colan | Giant-Size Chillers Featuring the Curse of Dracula #1 |
| Silver Dagger | 1974-06 | Steve Englehart, Frank Brunner | Doctor Strange #1 |
| Equinox | 1974-07 | Len Wein, Gil Kane | Marvel Team-Up #23 |
| Firelord | 1974-07 | Gerry Conway, John Buscema | Thor #225 |
| Silver Samurai | 1974-07 | Steve Gerber, Bob Brown | Daredevil #111 |
| Tarantula | 1974-07 | Gerry Conway, Ross Andru | The Amazing Spider-Man #134 |
| Bova | 1974-08 | Roy Thomas, Rich Buckler | Giant-Size Avengers #1 |
| Deathlok | 1974-08 | Rich Buckler, Doug Moench | Astonishing Tales #25 |
| Elementals | 1974-08 | Jenny Blake Isabella, Val Mayerik | Supernatural Thrillers #8 |
| Nuklo | 1974-08 | Roy Thomas, Rich Buckler, Dan Adkins | Giant-Size Avengers #1 |
| Tempus | 1974-08 | Gerry Conway, John Buscema | Giant-Size Fantastic Four #2 |
| Alpha the Ultimate Mutant | 1974-09 | Len Wein, Sal Buscema | Defenders #15 |
| Death-Stalker | 1974-09 | Stan Lee, Gene Colan, Steve Gerber, Bob Brown | Daredevil #113 (Note: First appeared as The Exterminator in Daredevil #39 (April 1968).) |
| Nitro | 1974-09 | Jim Starlin, Steve Englehart | Captain Marvel #34 |
| Hannibal King | 1974-10 | Marv Wolfman, Gene Colan | Tomb of Dracula #25 |
| Joy Meachum | 1974-10 | Doug Moench, Larry Hama | Marvel Premiere #18 |
| Mahkizmo | 1974-10 | Gerry Conway, Rich Buckler | Fantastic Four #151 |
| Wolverine | 1974-10 (cameo); 1974-11 (full) | Len Wein, Herb Trimpe | Incredible Hulk #180 (last panel cameo); Incredible Hulk #181 (first full appearance) |
| Colleen Wing | 1974-11 | Doug Moench, Larry Hama | Marvel Premiere #19 |
| Destiny | 1974-11 | Steve Gerber, George Tuska | Marvel Two-in-One #6 |
| Mindworm | 1974-11 | Gerry Conway, Ross Andru | The Amazing Spider-Man #138 |
| Weapon X (organization) | 1974-11 | Len Wein, John Romita Sr. | Incredible Hulk #181 |
| Bulldozer | 1974-11 | Len Wein, Sal Buscema | Defenders #17 |
| Piledriver | 1974-11 | Len Wein, Sal Buscema | Defenders #17 |
| Thunderball | 1974-11 | Len Wein, Sal Buscema | Defenders #17 |
| Ward Meachum | 1974-11 | Doug Moench, Larry Hama | Marvel Premiere #19 |
| Wrecking Crew | 1974-11 | Len Wein, Sal Buscema | Defenders #17 |
| Grizzly (Maxwell Markham) | 1974-12 | Gerry Conway, Ross Andru | The Amazing Spider-Man #139 |
| Hugh Jones | 1974-12 | Steve Englehart, Sal Buscema | Captain America #180 |
| Nomad (Steve Rogers) | 1974-12 | Steve Englehart, Sal Buscema | Captain America #180 |
| Roxxon Energy Corporation | 1974-12 | Steve Englehart, Sal Buscema | Captain America #180 |
| Adri Nital | 1975-01 | Marv Wolfman, Gene Colan | Tomb of Dracula #28 |
| Glory Grant | 1975-01 | Gerry Conway, Ross Andru | The Amazing Spider-Man #140 |
| Korvac | 1975-01 | Steve Gerber, Jim Starlin | Giant-Size Defenders #3 |
| Blackwing | 1975-02 | Gerry Conway, Don Heck | Daredevil #118 |
| Gaea | 1975-02 | Steve Englehart, Gene Colan | Doctor Strange, Master of the Mystic Arts #6 |
| Jamie Madrox (Multiple Man) | 1975-02 | Len Wein, Chris Claremont, John Buscema | Giant-Size Fantastic Four #4 |
| Pip the Troll | 1975-02 | Jim Starlin | Strange Tales #179 |
| Universal Church of Truth | 1975-02 | Jim Starlin | Strange Tales #178 |
| Clive Reston | 1975-03 | Doug Moench, Paul Gulacy | Giant-Size Master of Kung Fu #3 |
| Headmen | 1975-03 | Steve Gerber, Sal Buscema, Sal Trapani | Defenders #21 |
| Misty Knight | 1975-03 (full); 1972-03 (retcon) | Jenny Blake Isabella, Arvell Jones | Marvel Premiere #21 (first full appearance) (Note: Misty was first mentioned by name in the previous issue, Marvel Premiere #20 (Feb. 1975).); Marvel Team-Up #1 (retcon) (Note: A previously unnamed character later identified as Misty.) |
| Steel Serpent | 1975-03 | Jenny Blake Isabella, Frank McLaughlin | The Deadly Hands of Kung Fu #10 |
| Zheng Bao Yu | 1975-03 | Sax Rohmer, Doug Moench, Keith Pollard | Master of Kung Fu #26 |
| Black Goliath | 1975-04 | Jenny Blake Isabella, George Tuska | Luke Cage, Power Man #24 |
| Cyclone | 1975-04 | Gerry Conway, Ross Andru | The Amazing Spider-Man #143 |
| Devastator | 1975-04 | Len Wein, Herb Trimpe | Incredible Hulk #186 |
| Mr. Fish | 1975-04 | Bill Mantlo, George Tuska | Luke Cage, Power Man #29 |
| Colossus | 1975-05 | Len Wein, Dave Cockrum | Giant-Size X-Men #1 |
| Cotati | 1975-05 | Steve Englehart, Sal Buscema | Avengers #133 |
| Krakoa | 1975-05 | Len Wein, Dave Cockrum | Giant-Size X-Men #1 |
| Moses Magnum | 1975-05 | Gerry Conway, Ross Andru | Giant-Size Spider-Man #4 |
| Possessor | 1975-05 | Gerry Conway, John Buscema | Thor #235 |
| Nightcrawler | 1975-05 | Len Wein, Dave Cockrum | Giant-Size X-Men #1 |
| Storm | 1975-05 | Len Wein, Dave Cockrum | Giant-Size X-Men #1 |
| Thunderbird | 1975-05 | Len Wein, Dave Cockrum | Giant-Size X-Men #1 |
| Gamora | 1975-06 | Jim Starlin | Strange Tales #180 |
| Master Man | 1975-06 | Roy Thomas, Frank Robbins | Giant-Size Invaders #1 |
| Razor Fist | 1975-06 | Doug Moench, Paul Gulacy | Master of Kung Fu #29 |
| Aron (the Watcher) | 1975-07 | Steve Englehart, Al Milgrom, Jenny Blake Isabella | Captain Marvel #39 |
| Jackhammer | 1975-07 | Jenny Blake Isabella, Bob Brown | Daredevil #123 |
| Vance Astrovik | 1975-07 | Don Heck, Gerry Conway | Giant-Size Defenders #5 |
| Blake Tower | 1975-08 | Marv Wolfman, Bob Brown | Daredevil #124 |
| Copperhead | 1975-08 | Len Wein, Marv Wolfman, Gene Colan | Daredevil #124 |
| Dominic Fortune | 1975-08 | Len Wein, Howard Chaykin | Marvel Preview #2 |
| Dragonfly | 1975-08 | Chris Claremont, Len Wein | X-Men #94 |
| Frenchie | 1975-08 | Doug Moench, Don Perlin | Werewolf by Night #32 |
| Glorian | 1975-08 | Len Wein, Herb Trimpe | Incredible Hulk #190 (Note: First appeared as Thomas Gideon in Fantastic Four #34 (Jan. 1965).) |
| Hellcow | 1975-08 | Steve Gerber, Frank Brunner | Giant-Size Man-Thing #5 |
| Moon Knight | 1975-08 | Doug Moench, Don Perlin | Werewolf by Night #32 |
| Rafael Scarfe | 1975-08 | Chris Claremont, Pat Broderick | Marvel Premiere #23 |
| Skull the Slayer | 1975-08 | Marv Wolfman, Steve Gan | Skull the Slayer #1 |
| Straw Man | 1975-08 | Scott Edelman, Rico Rival | Dead of Night #11 |
| Manphibian | 1975-09 | Marv Wolfman, Jenny Blake Isabella, Dave Cockrum, Sam Grainger | Legion of Monsters #1 |
| Starhawk | 1975-09 | Steve Gerber, Sal Buscema | Defenders #27 |
| Brain Drain | 1975-10 | Roy Thomas, Frank Robbins | Invaders #2 (Note: Brain Drain is first mentioned in the previous issue, Invaders #1 (Sept. 1975).) |
| Brynocki | 1975-10 | Doug Moench, Paul Gulacy | Master of Kung Fu #33 |
| Champions | 1975-10 | Jenny Blake Isabella, Don Heck | Champions #1 |
| Chthon | 1975-10 | Marv Wolfman, Bill Mantlo, Yong Montano | Marvel Chillers #1 (Note: First identified as The Other, he was not named Chthon until Avengers #186 (July 1979).) |
| Harold H. Harold | 1975-10 | Marv Wolfman, Gene Colan | Tomb of Dracula #37 |
| In-Betweener | 1975-10 | Jim Starlin | Warlock #9 |
| Leiko Wu | 1975-10 | Doug Moench, Paul Gulacy | Master of Kung Fu #33 |
| Mimir | 1975-10 | Bill Mantlo, Roy Thomas, Sal Buscema | Thor #240 |
| Modred the Mystic | 1975-10 | Bill Mantlo, Yong Montano, Marv Wolfman | Marvel Chillers #1 |
| Osiris | 1975-10 | Bill Mantlo, Roy Thomas, Sal Buscema | Thor #240 |
| Torpedo | 1975-10 | Marv Wolfman, John Romita Sr. | Daredevil #126 |
| Ulysses Bloodstone | 1975-10 | Len Wein, Marv Wolfman, John Warner | Marvel Presents #1 |
| Aleta Ogord | 1975-11 | Steve Gerber, Sal Buscema, Vince Colletta | Defenders #29 |
| Nova (Frankie Raye) | 1975-11 | Roy Thomas, George Pérez | Fantastic Four #164 |
| U-Man | 1975-11 | Roy Thomas, Frank Robbins | Invaders #3 |
| Cockroach Hamilton | 1975-12 | Don McGregor, George Tuska, Vince Colletta | Luke Cage, Power Man #28 |
| Karla Sofen (Moonstone) | 1975-12 | Marv Wolfman, Frank Robbins | Captain America #192 |
| Moira MacTaggert | 1975-12 | Chris Claremont, Dave Cockrum | X-Men #96 |
| N'Garai | 1975-12 | Bill Mantlo, Chris Claremont, Dave Cockrum | X-Men #96 |
| Steven Lang | 1975-12 | Chris Claremont, Dave Cockrum | X-Men #96 |
| White Tiger (Hector Ayala) | 1975-12 | Bill Mantlo, George Pérez | The Deadly Hands of Kung Fu #19 |
| Courtney Ross | 1976 | Chris Claremont, Herb Trimpe, Fred Kida | Captain Britain Weekly #3 |
| Beverly Switzler | 1976-01 | Steve Gerber, Frank Brunner | Howard the Duck #1 |
| Meredith Quill | 1976-01 | Steve Englehart, Steve Gan, Bob McLeod | Marvel Preview #4 |
| Star-Lord | 1976-01 | Steve Englehart, Steve Gan, Bob McLeod | Marvel Preview #4 |
| Weirdworld | 1976-01 | Doug Moench, Mike Ploog | Marvel Super Action #1 |
| D'Ken Neramani | 1976-02 | Chris Claremont, Dave Cockrum | Uncanny X-Men #97 |
| Erik the Red | 1976-02 | Chris Claremont, Dave Cockrum | Uncanny X-Men #97 |
| Hellcat | 1976-02 | Steve Englehart, George Pérez | Avengers #144 (Note: Her alter ego Patsy Walker first appeared in Miss America Magazine #2 (Nov. 1944).) |
| Legion of Monsters | 1976-02 | Bill Mantlo, Frank Robbins, Steve Gan | Marvel Premiere #28 |
| Lilandra Neramani | 1976-02 | Chris Claremont, Dave Cockrum | Uncanny X-Men #97 |
| Ruby Thursday | 1976-02 | Steve Gerber, Sal Buscema, Jim Mooney | Defenders #32 |
| Shi'ar | 1976-02 | Chris Claremont, Dave Cockrum | Uncanny X-Men #97 |
| Bullseye | 1976-03 | Marv Wolfman, John Romita Sr. | Daredevil #131 |
| Jack of Hearts | 1976-03 | Bill Mantlo, Keith Giffen | The Deadly Hands of Kung Fu #22 |
| Omega the Unknown | 1976-03 | Steve Gerber, Mary Skrenes, Jim Mooney | Omega the Unknown #1 |
| Rocketeers | 1976-03 | Marv Wolfman, Bob Brown | Daredevil #131 |
| Scimitar | 1976-03 | Chris Claremont, John Byrne | Iron Fist #5 |
| Amanda Sefton | 1976-04 | Chris Claremont, Dave Cockrum | Uncanny X-Men #98 |
| Corporation | 1976-04 | Jack Kirby | The Deadly Hands of Kung Fu #23 |
| Liberty Legion | 1976-04 | Roy Thomas | Marvel Premiere #29 |
| Nikki | 1976-04 | Steve Gerber, Mary Skrenes | Marvel Presents #4 |
| Piranha Jones | 1976-04 | Don McGregor, Rich Buckler, Arv Jones, Keith Pollard | Luke Cage, Power Man #30 |
| Rampage | 1976-04 | Jenny Blake Isabella, Don Heck, John Tartag | Champions #5 |
| Shroud | 1976-04 | Steve Englehart, Herb Trimpe | Super-Villain Team-Up #5 |
| Blizzard | 1976-05 | Bill Mantlo, George Tuska | Iron Man #86 (Note: First appeared as Jack Frost in Tales of Suspense #45 (Sept. 1963).) |
| Mind-Wave | 1976-05 | Marv Wolfman, Bob Brown, Jim Mooney | Daredevil #133 |
| Mirage (Desmond Charne) | 1976-05 | Len Wein, Ross Andru | The Amazing Spider-Man #156 |
| Set | 1976-05 | Roy Thomas | Marvel Feature #6 (Note: Set is first mentioned in Conan the Barbarian #7 (July 1971).) |
| Starlight | 1976-05 | Steve Gerber, Sal Buscema | Defenders #35 (Note: First named Red Guardian, she became Starlight in Quasar #19 (Feb. 1991).) |
| Black Tom Cassidy | 1976-06 | Chris Claremont, Dave Cockrum | X-Men #99 |
| Contemplator | 1976-06 | Jack Kirby | Marvel Treasury Special: Captain America's Bicentennial Battles #1 |
| Gorr the Golden Gorilla | 1976-06 | Roy Thomas, George Pérez | Fantastic Four #171 |
| Marlene Alraune | 1976-06 | Doug Moench, Don Perlin | Marvel Spotlight #28 |
| Baron Blood | 1976-07 | Roy Thomas, Frank Robbins | Invaders #7 |
| Brother Tode | 1976-07 | Jack Kirby | Eternals #1 |
| Celestials | 1976-07 | Jack Kirby | Eternals #1 |
| Deviants | 1976-07 | Jack Kirby | Eternals #1 |
| Eternals | 1976-07 | Jack Kirby | Eternals #1 |
| Ikaris | 1976-07 | Jack Kirby | Eternals #1 |
| Kro | 1976-07 | Jack Kirby | Eternals #1 |
| Lucifer (Prince of Darkness) | 1976-07 | | Marvel Preview #7 |
| Makkari | 1976-07 | Jack Kirby | Eternals #1 |
| Rocket Raccoon | 1976-07 | Bill Mantlo, Keith Giffen | Marvel Preview #7 |
| Shockwave | 1976-07 | Tom Sutton, Doug Moench, Paul Gulacy | Master of Kung Fu #42 |
| Union Jack | 1976-07 | Roy Thomas, Frank Robbins | Invaders #7 |
| Darkforce | 1976-08 | Jenny Blake Isabella, George Tuska | Champions #7 |
| Darkstar | 1976-08 | Jenny Blake Isabella, George Tuska | Champions #7 |
| Jean DeWolff | 1976-08 | Bill Mantlo, Sal Buscema | Marvel Team-Up #48 |
| Jeryn Hogarth | 1976-08 | Chris Claremont, John Byrne | Iron Fist #6 |
| Mangler | 1976-08 | Don McGregor, Frank Robbins | Luke Cage, Power Man #34 |
| Wraith (Brian DeWolff) | 1976-08 | Bill Mantlo, Sal Buscema | Marvel Team-Up #48 |
| Woodgod | 1976-08 | Bill Mantlo, Keith Giffen | Marvel Premiere #31 |
| Mainframe | 1976-09 | Jim Valentino | Amazing Adventures #38 |
| Nova (Richard Rider) | 1976-09 | Marv Wolfman, John Buscema | Nova #1 |
| Xandar | 1976-09 | Marv Wolfman, John Buscema | Nova #1 |
| Captain Britain | 1976-10 | Chris Claremont, Herb Trimpe | Captain Britain Weekly #1 |
| Cheshire Cat | 1976-10 | Marv Wolfman, Ron Wilson, Ed Hannigan | Luke Cage, Power Man #37 |
| Condor | 1976-10 | Marv Wolfman, John Buscema | Nova #2 |
| Jigsaw | 1976-10 | Len Wein, Ross Andru | The Amazing Spider-Man #161 |
| Merlyn | 1976-10 | Chris Claremont, Herb Trimpe, Fred Kida | Captain Britain Weekly #1 |
| Phoenix Force | 1976-10 | Chris Claremont, Dave Cockrum | Uncanny X-Men #101 |
| Powerhouse | 1976-10 | Marv Wolfman, John Buscema, Joe Sinnott | Nova #2 |
| Roma | 1976-10 | Chris Claremont, Herb Trimpe, Fred Kida | Captain Britain Weekly #1 |
| Diamondhead | 1976-11 | Marv Wolfmann, Sal Buscema | Nova #3 |
| Human Fly | 1976-11 | Len Wein, Bill Mantlo, Gil Kane | Amazing Spider-Man Annual #10 |
| Thena | 1976-11 | Jack Kirby | Eternals #5 |
| Zuras | 1976-11 | Jack Kirby | Eternals #5 |
| Betsy Braddock | 1976-12 | Chris Claremont, Herb Trimpe | Captain Britain Weekly #8 |
| Captain Ultra | 1976-12 | Roy Thomas, George Pérez | Fantastic Four #177 |
| Corruptor | 1976-12 | Marv Wolfman, Sal Buscema | Nova #4 |
| Jamie Braddock | 1976-12 | Chris Claremont, Herb Trimpe, Fred Kida | Captain Britain Weekly #9 |
| Spitfire (Jacqueline Falsworth) | 1976-12 | Roy Thomas, Frank Robbins | Invaders #12 (Note: Spitfire's alter ego Jacqueline Falsworth first appeared in The Invaders #7 (July 1976).) |
| Texas Twister | 1976-12 | Roy Thomas, George Pérez | Fantastic Four #177 |
| Tyrak | 1976-12 | Gerry Conway, George Pérez | Avengers #154 |
| Bereet | 1977-01 | Doug Moench, Walt Simonson | Rampaging Hulk #1 |
| Killer Shrike | 1977-01 | John Warner, John Buscema | Rampaging Hulk #1 |
| Ms. Marvel (Carol Danvers) | 1977-01 | Gerry Conway, Carla Conway, John Buscema | Ms. Marvel #1 |
| Princess Zanda | 1977-01 | Jack Kirby | Black Panther #1 |
| Enforcer | 1977-02 | Gerry Conway, Don Glut, Don Heck | Ghost Rider #22 |
| Karkas | 1977-02 | Jack Kirby | Eternals #8 |
| Lance Hunter | 1977-02 | Gary Friedrich, Herb Trimpe | Captain Britain Weekly #19 |
| Lightmaster | 1977-02 | Jim Shooter, Sal Buscema | Peter Parker, the Spectacular Spider-Man #3 |
| Ransak the Reject | 1977-02 | Jack Kirby | Eternals #8 |
| Sphinx | 1977-02 | Marv Wolfman, Sal Buscema | Nova #6 |
| Spider-Woman (Jessica Drew) | 1977-02 | Archie Goodwin, Marie Severin | Marvel Spotlight #32 |
| S.T.R.I.K.E. | 1977-02 | Gary Friedrich, Larry Lieber | Captain Britain Weekly #17 |
| Crusaders | 1977-03 | Roy Thomas, Frank Robbins | Invaders #14 |
| Dyna-Mite (Destroyer) | 1977-03 | Roy Thomas, Frank Robbins | Invaders #14 |
| Gardener | 1977-03 | Bill Mantlo, John Byrne | Marvel Team-Up #55 |
| Ghost Girl | 1977-03 | Roy Thomas, Frank Robbins | Invaders #14 |
| Goldbug | 1977-03 | Marv Wolfman, Lee Elias | Luke Cage, Power Man #41 |
| Hitman | 1977-03 | Archie Goodwin, Sal Buscema | The Spectacular Spider-Man #4 |
| Janus | 1977-03 | Marv Wolfman, Gene Colan | Tomb of Dracula #54 (Note: Unnamed in first appearance. Not named until Tomb of Dracula #55 (April 1977).) |
| Spirit of '76 | 1977-03 | Roy Thomas, Frank Robbins | Invaders #14 |
| Sprite (Eternal) | 1977-03 | Jack Kirby | Eternals #9 |
| 3-D Man | 1977-04 | Roy Thomas, Jim Craig | Marvel Premiere #35 |
| Arnim Zola | 1977-04 | Jack Kirby | Captain America #208 |
| Ch'od | 1977-04 | Dave Cockrum | X-Men #104 |
| Corsair | 1977-04 | Dave Cockrum | X-Men #104 |
| Devil-Slayer | 1977-04 | David Anthony Kraft, Rich Buckler | Marvel Spotlight #33 |
| Graviton | 1977-04 | Jim Shooter, Sal Buscema | Avengers #158 |
| Modular Man | 1977-04 | John Warner, Val Mayerik | Rampaging Hulk #2 |
| Peter van Zante (Water Wizard / Aqueduct) | 1977-04 | Jim Shooter, Don Heck | Ghost Rider (vol. 2) #23 |
| Starjammers | 1977-04 | Dave Cockrum | X-Men #104 |
| Will o' the Wisp | 1977-04 | Len Wein, Ross Andru | The Amazing Spider-Man #167 |
| Doctor Minerva | 1977-05 | Scott Edelman, Al Milgrom | Captain Marvel #50 |
| Doughboy | 1977-05 | Jack Kirby | Captain America #209 |
| Druig | 1977-05 | Jack Kirby | Eternals #11 |
| Primus | 1977-05 | Jack Kirby | Captain America #209 |
| Warrior Woman | 1977-05 | Roy Thomas, Frank Robbins | Invaders #16 |
| Constrictor | 1977-06 | Len Wein, John Romita Sr., Sal Buscema | Incredible Hulk #212 |
| J'son | 1977-06 | Chris Claremont, John Byrne | Marvel Preview #11 |
| John Carter (Warlord of Mars) | 1977-06 | Edgar Rice Burroughs, Marv Wolfman, Gil Kane | John Carter, Warlord of Mars #1 (Note: Prior to Marvel's involvement, Carter first appeared in 1912 in The All-Story magazine.) |
| Tarzan (Lord of the Jungle) | 1977-06 | Edgar Rice Burroughs, Roy Thomas, John Buscema | Tarzan, Lord of the Jungle #1 (Note: Prior to Marvel's involvement, Tarzan first appeared in 1912 in The All-Story magazine.) |
| Forgotten One | 1977-07 | Jack Kirby | Eternals #13 |
| Machine Man | 1977-07 | Jack Kirby | 2001: A Space Odyssey #8 |
| Swarm | 1977-07 | John Byrne, Bill Mantlo | Champions #14 |
| Doctor Bong | 1977-08 | Steve Gerber, Marie Severin | Howard the Duck #15 |
| Dreadknight | 1977-08 | Bill Mantlo, George Tuska | Iron Man #101 |
| Godzilla (King of the Monsters) | 1977-08 | Tomoyuki Tanaka, Ishirō Honda, Eiji Tsuburaya, Doug Moench, Herb Trimpe | Godzilla #1 (Note: Prior to his portrayal in Marvel Comics, Godzilla first appeared in the 1954 film Gojira.) |
| Jocasta | 1977-08 | Jim Shooter, George Pérez | Avengers #162 |
| Nicholas Scratch | 1977-08 | Len Wein, George Pérez | Fantastic Four #185 |
| Sabretooth | 1977-08 | Chris Claremont, John Byrne | Iron Fist #14 |
| Bushmaster (John McIver) | 1977-09 | Chris Claremont, John Byrne | Iron Fist #15 |
| Deathbird | 1977-09 | Chris Claremont, Dave Cockrum | Ms. Marvel #9 |
| Lunatik | 1977-09 | Keith Giffen | Defenders #51 |
| Night Flyer | 1977-09 | Jack Kirby | Captain America #213 |
| Ringer | 1977-09 | David Anthony Kraft, Keith Giffen | Spectacular Spider-Man #58 |
| Rocket Racer | 1977-09 | Len Wein, Ross Andru | The Amazing Spider-Man #172 |
| Salem's Seven | 1977-09 | Len Wein, George Pérez | Fantastic Four #186 |
| Gladiator (Kallark) | 1977-10 | Chris Claremont, Dave Cockrum | X-Men #107 |
| Hepzibah | 1977-10 | Dave Cockrum | X-Men #107 |
| Imperial Guard | 1977-10 | Chris Claremont, Dave Cockrum | X-Men #107 |
| Neutron | 1977-10 | Chris Claremont, Dave Cockrum | X-Men #107 |
| Presence | 1977-10 | David Anthony Kraft, Keith Giffen | Defenders #52 |
| Raza Longknife | 1977-10 | Dave Cockrum | X-Men #107 |
| Slaymaster | 1977-10 | Jim Lawrence, Larry Lieber, Ron Wilson | Super Spider-Man and Captain Britain #243 |
| Smasher | 1977-10 | Chris Claremont, Dave Cockrum | X-Men #107 |
| Starbolt | 1977-10 | Chris Claremont, Dave Cockrum | X-Men #107 |
| Titan | 1977-10 | Chris Claremont, Dave Cockrum | X-Men #107 |
| Batragon | 1977-11 | Doug Moench, Herb Trimpe | Godzilla #4 |
| Burner (Crucible) | 1977-11 | Jack Kirby | Captain America Annual #4 |
| Doctor Demonicus | 1977-11 | Doug Moench, Tom Sutton | Godzilla, King of the Monsters #4 |
| Hecate | 1977-11 | Chris Claremont, Sal Buscema | Ms. Marvel #11 |
| Henry Peter Gyrich | 1977-11 | Jim Shooter, John Byrne | Avengers #165 |
| Kismet (Paragon, Ayesha) | 1977-11 | Len Wein, David Anthony Kraft, Herb Trimpe | Incredible Hulk Annual #6 (Note: First appeared as Paragon, later called Kismet in Marvel Two-in-One #61 (Mar. 1980).) |
| Lifter | 1977-11 | Jack Kirby | Captain America Annual #4 |
| Maria Stark | 1977-11 | Bill Mantlo, George Tuska | Iron Man #104 |
| Paralyzer | 1977-11 | Jack Kirby | Captain America Annual #4 (Note: First called Shocker, renamed Paralyzer in Captain America #343 (July 1988).) |
| Peepers | 1977-11 | Jack Kirby | Captain America Annual #4 |
| Razorback | 1977-11 | Archie Goodwin, Bill Mantlo, Sal Buscema | Peter Parker, the Spectacular Spider-Man #12 |
| Resistants (Mutant Force) | 1977-11 | Jack Kirby | Captain America Annual #4 (Note: First identified as Brotherhood of Evil Mutants. Referred to as Mutant Force in Defenders #78 (Dec. 1979) and The Resistants in Captain America #343 (July 1988).) |
| Dreaming Celestial | 1977-12 | Jack Kirby | Eternals #18 |
| Lord Chaos | 1977-12 | Jim Starlin | Marvel Two-in-One Annual #2 |
| Master Order | 1977-12 | Jim Starlin | Marvel Two-in-One Annual #2 |
| Scarlet Scarab | 1977-12 | Roy Thomas, Archie Goodwin, Frank Robbins | Invaders #23 |
| Arcade | 1978-01 | Chris Claremont, John Byrne | Marvel Team-Up #65 |
| Paladin | 1978-01 | Jim Shooter, Carmine Infantino | Daredevil #150 |
| Quasar (Wendell Vaughn) (Marvel Boy, Marvel Man) | 1978-01 | Donald F. Glut, Roy Thomas, John Buscema | Captain America #217 |
| Red Ronin | 1978-01 | Doug Moench, Herb Trimpe | Godzilla, King of the Monsters #6 |
| Vamp | 1978-01 | Roy Thomas, Don Glut, John Buscema | Captain America #217 |
| Guardian (Weapon Alpha) | 1978-02 | John Byrne | X-Men #109 |
| D'Spayre | 1978-04 | Chris Claremont, John Byrne | Marvel Team-Up #68 |
| Devil Dinosaur | 1978-04 | Jack Kirby | Devil Dinosaur #1 |
| Dmitri Bukharin | 1978-04 | Bill Mantlo, Carmine Infantino | Iron Man #109 |
| Human Top (David Mitchell) | 1978-04 | Roy Thomas, Frank Robbins | Invaders #27 |
| Moon-Boy | 1978-04 | Jack Kirby | Devil Dinosaur #1 |
| Vanguard | 1978-04 | Bill Mantlo, Carmine Infantino | Iron Man #109 |
| Blackout (Marcus Daniels) | 1978-05 | Marv Wolfman, Carmine Infantino, Tom Palmer | Nova #19 |
| Magnus the Sorcerer | 1978-05 | Marv Wolfman, Carmine Infantino | Spider-Woman #2 |
| Mystique | 1978-05 | Chris Claremont, Dave Cockrum | Ms. Marvel #16 |
| Yetrigar | 1978-05 | Doug Moench, Herb Trimpe | Godzilla #10 |
| Brothers Grimm | 1978-06 | Marv Wolfman, Carmine Infantino | Spider-Woman #3 |
| Ben Urich | 1978-07 | Roger McKenzie, Gene Colan | Daredevil #153 |
| Beta-Beast | 1978-07 | Doug Moench, Herb Trimpe | Godzilla #12 |
| Abdul Alhazred (The Mad Arab) | 1978-08 | H.P. Lovecraft, Dwight J. Zimmerman, Nelson Yomtov, Paul Ryan | Tarzan #15 |
| Big Wheel | 1978-08 | Marv Wolfman, Ross Andru | The Amazing Spider-Man #183 (Note: Big Wheel's other identity Jackson Weele first appeared an issue earlier, in The Amazing Spider-Man #182 (July 1978).) |
| Dweller-in-Darkness | 1978-08 | Gerry Conway, Roger Stern, Tom Sutton | Doctor Strange #30 (Note: Dweller-in-Darkness had been mentioned previously in Thor #229 (Nov. 1974).) |
| Elders of the Universe | 1978-08 | Jim Shooter, Bill Mantlo, David Wenzel | Avengers #174 |
| Hermod | 1978-08 | Roy Thomas, John Buscema | Thor #274 |
| Hoder | 1978-08 | Roy Thomas, John Buscema | Thor #274 |
| Hugin and Munin | 1978-08 | Roy Thomas, John Buscema | Thor #274 |
| Arsenal | 1978-09 | Bill Mantlo, Keith Giffen | Iron Man #114 |
| H.E.R.B.I.E. | 1978-09 (animated); 1979-08 (comics) | Stan Lee, Jack Kirby | New Fantastic Four ep. 1 (animated series) Fantastic Four #209 (comics) |
| Power Broker | 1978-09 | Roger Stern, Sal Buscema | Machine Man #6 |
| Moonstone (Karla Sofen) | 1978-10 | Marv Wolfman, Frank Robbins, Roger Stern, Peter Gillis, Sal Buscema | Incredible Hulk #228 (Note: First appeared as Karla Sofen in Captain America #192 (Dec. 1976).) |
| Elysius | 1978-11 | Doug Moench, Pat Broderick | Captain Marvel #59 |
| Bethany Cabe | 1978-12 | David Michelinie, Bob Layton | Iron Man #117 |
| Blue Streak | 1978-12 | Roy Thomas, John Buscema | Captain America #217 |
| Carrion | 1978-12 | Bill Mantlo, Jim Mooney, Frank Springer | The Spectacular Spider-Man #25 |
| Heroes for Hire | 1978-12 | Ed Hannigan, Lee Elias | Power Man and Iron Fist #54 |
| Outcasts | 1978-12 | Bill Mantlo, Sal Buscema | Fantastic Four Annual #13 |
| Bug | 1979-01 | Bill Mantlo, Michael Golden | Micronauts #1 |
| Iron Cross | 1979-01 | Roy Thomas, Frank Robbins | Invaders #36 |
| Machinesmith | 1979-01 | Stan Lee, Bill Mantlo, Chic Stone | Marvel Two-in-One #47 (Note: Machinesmith's other identity Starr Saxon first appeared in Daredevil #49 (Feb. 1969).) |
| Micronauts | 1979-01 | Bill Mantlo, Michael Golden | Micronauts #1 (Note: Micronauts had previously appeared as action figures produced by Mego in 1976.) |
| Shadow King | 1979-01 | Chris Claremont, John Byrne | Uncanny X-Men #117 |
| Skein | 1979-01 | Mark Gruenwald, Carmine Infantino | Spider-Woman #10 |
| Mariko Yashida | 1979-02 | Chris Claremont, John Byrne | Uncanny X-Men #118 |
| Lady Lotus | 1979-02 | Don Glut, Rick Hoberg, Chic Stone, Alan Kupperberg | Invaders #37 |
| Ant-Man (Scott Lang) | 1979-03 | David Michelinie, John Byrne | Avengers #181 |
| Justin Hammer | 1979-03 | David Michelinie, John Romita Jr., Bob Layton | Iron Man #120 |
| Alpha Flight | 1979-04 | John Byrne | Uncanny X-Men #120 |
| Aurora | 1979-04 | John Byrne | Uncanny X-Men #120 |
| Cassie Lang | 1979-04 | John Byrne, David Michelinie | Marvel Premiere #47 |
| Cross Technological Enterprises | 1979-04 | John Byrne, David Michelinie | Marvel Premiere #47 |
| Darren Cross (Yellowjacket) | 1979-04 | John Byrne, David Michelinie | Marvel Premiere #47 |
| Darter | 1979-04 | Bill Mantlo, Jim Mooney | Peter Parker, the Spectacular Spider-Man #29 |
| Northstar | 1979-04 | John Byrne | Uncanny X-Men #120 |
| Nova Corps | 1979-04 | Marv Wolfman | Fantastic Four #205 |
| Protector | 1979-04 | Marv Wolfman, Keith Pollard, Joe Sinnott | Fantastic Four #205 |
| Sasquatch | 1979-04 | John Byrne | Uncanny X-Men #120 |
| Shaman | 1979-04 | John Byrne | Uncanny X-Men #120 |
| Snowbird | 1979-04 | John Byrne | Uncanny X-Men #120 |
| Super-Axis | 1979-05 | Roy Thomas, Alan Kupperberg | Invaders #40 |
| Crossfire | 1979-06 | Steven Grant, Jim Craig | Marvel Two-in-One #52 |
| Ereshkigal | 1979-06 | Roy Thomas, John Buscema | Thor #284 |
| Maximillian Zaran | 1979-06 | Mike Zeck | Master of Kung Fu (vol. 2) #77 |
| Champions of Xandar | 1979-07 | | Fantastic Four #208 |
| Ludi | 1979-07 | Roger Stern, Ralph Macchio, Tom Sutton | Doctor Strange #35 |
| Black Cat | 1979-07 | Marv Wolfman, Keith Pollard | The Amazing Spider-Man #194 |
| El Águila | 1979-08 | Dave Cockrum, Mary Jo Duffy | Power Man and Iron Fist #58 |
| Captain Universe | 1979-08 | Bill Mantlo, Michael Golden | Micronauts #8 |
| Grapplers | 1979-08 | Mark Gruenwald, Ralph Macchio, John Byrne | Marvel Two-in-One #54 |
| Letha | 1979-08 | Mark Gruenwald, Ralph Macchio, John Byrne | Marvel Two-in-One #54 |
| Poundcakes | 1979-08 | Mark Gruenwald, Ralph Macchio, John Byrne | Marvel Two-in-One #54 |
| Silencer | 1979-08 | Mark Evanier, Sal Buscema | Marvel Premiere #49 |
| Screaming Mimi | 1979-08 | Mark Gruenwald, Ralph Macchio, John Byrne | Marvel Two-in-One #54 |
| Debra Whitman | 1979-09 | Marv Wolfman, Al Milgrom | The Amazing Spider-Man #196 |
| Proteus | 1979-09 | Chris Claremont, John Byrne | Uncanny X-Men #125 |
| Terrax | 1979-10 | Marv Wolfman, John Byrne | Fantastic Four #211 |
| Hellrazor | 1979-11 | Steven Grant, Gene Colan | Marvel Team-Up #87 |
| Hypno-Hustler | 1979-11 | Bill Mantlo, Frank Springer | The Spectacular Spider-Man #24 |
| Dire Wraiths | 1979-12 | Bill Mantlo, Al Milgrom | Rom: Spaceknight #1 |
| Hornet | 1979-12 | Michael Fleisher, Frank Springer | Spider-Woman #21 |
| Nth Man | 1979-12 | Bill Mantlo, Ron Wilson | Marvel Two-in-One #58 (Note: Thomas Lightner (Nth Man) first appeared as Blacksun in Marvel Two-in-One #21 (Nov. 1976).) |
| Rom the Space Knight | 1979-12 | Scott Dankman, Richard C. Levy, Bryan L. McCoy | Rom: Spaceknight #1 |
| Cutthroat | 1980-01 | Chris Claremont, Michael Netzer, Rich Buckler | Marvel Team-Up #89 |
| Emma Frost (White Queen) | 1980-01 | Chris Claremont, John Byrne | Uncanny X-Men #129 |
| Hellfire Club | 1980-01 | Chris Claremont, John Byrne | Uncanny X-Men #129 |
| Icemaster | 1980-01 | Frank Miller | Avengers #191 (Note: Appeared in an advertisement for Hostess Fruit Pies before fully appearing in the comics.) |
| Kitty Pryde | 1980-01 | Chris Claremont, John Byrne | Uncanny X-Men #129 |
| Margali Szardos | 1980-01 | Chris Claremont, John Romita Jr. | Uncanny X-Men Annual #4 |
| Sebastian Shaw | 1980-01 | Chris Claremont, John Byrne | Uncanny X-Men #129 |
| Dazzler | 1980-02 | Tom DeFalco, Louise Simonson, Roger Stern | Uncanny X-Men #130 |
| She-Hulk | 1980-02 | Stan Lee, John Buscema | Savage She-Hulk #1 |
| Futurist | 1980-03 | Marv Wolfman, John Byrne | Fantastic Four #216 |
| Gorilla Girl | 1980-03 | Steven Grant, Pat Broderick | Marvel Team-Up #91 |
| Donald Pierce (White Bishop) | 1980-04 | Chris Claremont, John Byrne | Uncanny X-Men #132 |
| Harry Leland (Black Bishop) | 1980-04 | Chris Claremont, John Byrne | Uncanny X-Men #132 |
| Jackdaw | 1980-04 | Dez Skinn, Steve Parkhouse, Paul Neary, John Stokes | Incredible Hulk Weekly #57 |
| Sage | 1980-04 | Chris Claremont, John Byrne | Uncanny X-Men #132 |
| Dansen Macabre | 1980-05 | Steven Grant, Carmine Infantino | Marvel Team-Up #93 |
| Taskmaster | 1980-05 | David Michelinie, George Pérez | Avengers #195 |
| Anaconda | 1980-06 | Mark Gruenwald, Ralph Macchio | Marvel Two-in-One #64 |
| Black Mamba | 1980-06 | Mark Gruenwald, Ralph Macchio | Marvel Two-in-One #64 |
| Dark Phoenix | 1980-06 | Chris Claremont, John Byrne | Uncanny X-Men #134 |
| Death Adder | 1980-06 | Mark Gruenwald, Ralph Macchio | Marvel Two-in-One #64 |
| Roderick Kingsley | 1980-06 | Roger Stern, Mike Zeck | Peter Parker, the Spectacular Spider-Man #43 |
| Sidewinder | 1980-06 | Mark Gruenwald, Ralph Macchio | Marvel Two-in-One #64 |
| Bernie Rosenthal | 1980-07 | Roger Stern, John Byrne | Captain America #247 |
| Robert Kelly | 1980-07 | Chris Claremont, John Byrne | Uncanny X-Men #135 |
| Baron Brimstone | 1980-08 | Tom DeFalco, Steve Ditko | Machine Man #16 |
| Collective Man | 1980-08 | Bill Mantlo, Sal Buscema | Incredible Hulk #250 |
| Sabra | 1980-08 | Bill Mantlo, Sal Buscema | Incredible Hulk #250 |
| Snake Marston | 1980-08 | Tom DeFalco, Steve Ditko | Machine Man #16 |
| Fusion | 1980-09 | Dennis O'Neil, John Romita Jr. | The Amazing Spider-Man #208 |
| Hussar | 1980-09 | Chris Claremont, John Byrne | Uncanny X-Men #137 |
| Karl Malus | 1980-09 | Michael Fleisher, Steve Leialoha, Jim Mooney | Spider-Woman #30 |
| Manta | 1980-09 | Chris Claremont, John Byrne | Uncanny X-Men #137 |
| Warstar | 1980-09 | Chris Claremont, John Byrne | Uncanny X-Men #137 |
| Calypso | 1980-10 | Dennis O'Neil, Alan Weiss | The Amazing Spider-Man #209 |
| Sunset Bain | 1980-10 | Tom DeFalco, Steve Ditko | Machine Man #17 |
| Bushman | 1980-11 | Doug Moench, Bill Sienkiewicz | Moon Knight #1 |
| Edwin Cord | 1980-11 | David Michelinie, Frank Miller | Daredevil #167 |
| Khonshu | 1980-11 | Doug Moench, Bill Sienkiewicz | Moon Knight #1 |
| Madame Web | 1980-11 | Dennis O'Neil, John Romita Jr. | The Amazing Spider-Man #210 |
| Mauler | 1980-11 | David Michelinie, Frank Miller | Daredevil #167 |
| Stevie Hunter | 1980-11 | Chris Claremont, John Byrne | Uncanny X-Men #139 |
| Vindicator (Guardian) | 1980-11 | Chris Claremont, John Byrne | Uncanny X-Men #139 |
| Karma | 1980-12 | Chris Claremont, Frank Miller | Marvel Team-Up #100 |
| Turner D. Century | 1980-12 | J. M. DeMatteis, Steve Leialoha, Bruce D. Patterson | Spider-Woman #33 |
| U-Foes | 1980-12 | Bill Mantlo, Sal Buscema | Incredible Hulk #254 |
| Avalanche | 1981-01 | Chris Claremont, John Byrne | Uncanny X-Men #141 |
| Deathurge | 1981-01 | Mark Gruenwald, Ralph Macchio | Marvel Two-in-One #71 |
| Destiny (Irene Adler) | 1981-01 | Chris Claremont, John Byrne | Uncanny X-Men #141 |
| Elektra | 1981-01 | Frank Miller | Daredevil #168 |
| Grotto | 1981-01 | Frank Miller | Daredevil #168 |
| Hydro-Man | 1981-01 | Dennis O'Neil, John Romita Jr. | The Amazing Spider-Man #212 |
| Maelstrom | 1981-01 | Mark Gruenwald, Ralph Macchio, Ron Wilson | Marvel Two-in-One #71 |
| Pyro | 1981-01 | Chris Claremont, John Byrne | Uncanny X-Men #141 |
| Rachel Summers (Phoenix, Marvel Girl) | 1981-01 | Chris Claremont, John Byrne | Uncanny X-Men #141 |
| Starshine | 1981-01 | Bill Mantlo, Sal Buscema | Rom #14 |
| Asmodeus | 1981-02 | Michael Fleisher, Don Perlin | Ghost Rider #53 |
| Jack O'Lantern | 1981-02 | Tom DeFalco, Steve Ditko | Machine Man #19 |
| Jason Macendale | 1981-02 | Tom DeFalco, Steve Ditko | Machine Man #19 |
| Sunturion | 1981-02 | David Michelinie, John Romita Jr., Bob Layton | Iron Man #143 |
| Arabian Knight | 1981-03 | Bill Mantlo, Al Milgrom | Incredible Hulk #257 |
| Lee Forrester | 1981-03 | Chris Claremont, John Byrne | Uncanny X-Men #143 |
| Sarah Rogers | 1981-03 | Roger Stern, John Byrne | Captain America #255 |
| Augustine Cross | 1981-04 | David Michelinie, John Romita Jr. | Iron Man #145 |
| Gargoyle | 1981-04 | J. M. DeMatteis, Don Perlin | Defenders #94 |
| Hybrid (Jimmy Marks) | 1981-04 | Bill Mantlo, Sal Buscema | Rom #17 |
| Raiders | 1981-04 | David Michelinie, Bob Layton | Iron Man #145 |
| Siryn | 1981-04 | Chris Claremont, Steve Leialoha | Spider-Woman #37 |
| Soviet Super-Soldiers | 1981-04 | Bill Mantlo, Sal Buscema | Incredible Hulk #258 |
| Ursa Major | 1981-04 | Bill Mantlo, Sal Buscema | Incredible Hulk #258 |
| Blacklash | 1981-05 | David Michelinie, Bob Layton, John Romita Jr. | Iron Man #146 (Note: First appeared as Whiplash in Tales of Suspense #97 (Jan. 1968).) |
| Blue Shield | 1981-07 | Tom DeFalco, Frank Springer | Dazzler #5 |
| Caliban | 1981-08 | Chris Claremont, Dave Cockrum | Uncanny X-Men #148 |
| Morpheus | 1981-08 | Doug Moench, Bill Sienkiewicz | Moon Knight #12 |
| Crazy Gang | 1981-09 | Dave Thorpe, Paul Neary, Alan Davis | Marvel Super-Heroes #377 |
| Firestar | 1981-09 (animated); 1981-12 (comics) | Dennis Marks, Dan Spiegle, Christy Marx, John Romita Sr., Rick Hoberg | Spider-Man and His Amazing Friends (animated series); Spider-Man and His Amazing Friends #1 (comics) |
| Hand (organization) | 1981-09 | Frank Miller | Daredevil #174 |
| Kirigi | 1981-09 | Frank Miller | Daredevil #174 |
| Mad Jim Jaspers | 1981-09 | Dave Thorpe, Alan Davis | Marvel Super-Heroes #377 |
| American Eagle | 1981-10 | Doug Moench, Ron Wilson | Marvel Two-In-One Annual #6 |
| Flying Tiger | 1981-10 | Chris Claremont, Steve Leialoha, Bob Wiacek | Spider-Woman #40 |
| Firebird | 1981-11 | Bill Mantlo, Sal Buscema | Incredible Hulk #265 |
| Rangers | 1981-11 | Bill Mantlo, Sal Buscema | Incredible Hulk #265 |
| Rogue | 1981-11 | Chris Claremont, Michael Golden | Avengers Annual #10 |
| Shooting Star | 1981-11 | Bill Mantlo, Sal Buscema | Incredible Hulk #265 |
| Stick | 1981-11 | Frank Miller | Daredevil #176 |
| Saturnyne | 1981-12 | Dave Thorpe, Alan Davis | The Mighty World of Marvel #381 |
| Stained Glass Scarlet | 1981-12 | Doug Moench, Jim Shooter, Bill Sienkiewicz | Moon Knight #14 |
| Brian Banner | 1982-01 | Bill Mantlo, Sal Buscema, Mike Mignola | Incredible Hulk #267 |
| Null the Living Darkness | 1982-01 | J. M. DeMatteis, Don Perlin | Defenders #103 |
| Rebecca Banner | 1982-01 | Bill Mantlo, Sal Buscema | Incredible Hulk #267 |
| Belasco | 1982-02 | Bruce Jones, Brent Anderson | Ka-Zar the Savage #11 |
| Roberta | 1982-02 | John Byrne | Fantastic Four #239 |
| Cloak and Dagger | 1982-03 | Bill Mantlo, Ed Hannigan | Peter Parker, the Spectacular Spider-Man #64 |
| Everyman | 1982-03 | J. M. DeMatteis, Mike Zeck | Captain America #267 |
| Ghost Maker | 1982-03 | Doug Moench, Gene Day | Master of Kung Fu #110 |
| Luna Maximoff | 1982-03 | John Byrne | Fantastic Four #240 |
| Vertigo | 1982-03 | Chris Claremont, Michael Golden | Marvel Fanfare #1 |
| Blackjack O'Hare | 1982-05 | Bill Mantlo, Sal Buscema | Incredible Hulk #271 |
| Lylla | 1982-05 | Bill Mantlo, Sal Buscema | Incredible Hulk #271 |
| Mistress Love | 1982-05 | J. M. DeMatteis, Don Perlin | Defenders #107 |
| Professor Power | 1982-05 | J. M. DeMatteis, Herb Trimpe | Marvel Team-Up #117 |
| Pyko | 1982-05 | Bill Mantlo, Sal Buscema | Incredible Hulk #271 |
| Wal Rus | 1982-05 | Bill Mantlo, Sal Buscema | Incredible Hulk #271 |
| Blitzkrieg | 1982-06 | Mark Gruenwald, Bill Mantlo, Steven Grant, John Romita Jr., Pablo Marcos | Marvel Super Hero Contest of Champions #1 |
| Peregrine | 1982-06 | Mark Gruenwald, Bill Mantlo, Steven Grant, John Romita Jr., Pablo Marcos | Marvel Super Hero Contest of Champions #1 |
| Shamrock | 1982-06 | Mark Gruenwald, Bill Mantlo, Steven Grant, John Romita Jr., Pablo Marcos | Marvel Super Hero Contest of Champions #1 |
| Fury | 1982-07 | Alan Moore, Alan Davis | Marvel Super-Heroes #387 |
| S'ym | 1982-08 | Chris Claremont, Brent Anderson | Uncanny X-Men #160 |
| Vermin | 1982-08 | J. M. DeMatteis, Mike Zeck | Captain America #272 |
| Cannonball | 1982-09 | Chris Claremont, Bob McLeod | Marvel Graphic Novel #4 |
| Danielle Moonstar | 1982-09 | Chris Claremont, Bob McLeod | Marvel Graphic Novel #4 |
| New Mutants | 1982-09 | Chris Claremont, Bob McLeod | Marvel Graphic Novel #4 |
| Shingen Yashida | 1982-09 | Chris Claremont, Frank Miller | Wolverine #1 |
| Sunspot | 1982-09 | Chris Claremont, Bob McLeod | Marvel Graphic Novel #4 |
| Wolfsbane | 1982-09 | Chris Claremont, Bob McLeod | Marvel Graphic Novel #4 |
| Yukio | 1982-09 | Chris Claremont, Frank Miller | Wolverine #1 |
| Champion of the Universe | 1982-10 | Tom DeFalco, Ron Wilson | Marvel Two-in-One Annual #7 |
| Chaste (organization) | 1982-10 | Frank Miller | Daredevil #187 |
| Kristoff Vernard | 1982-10 | John Byrne | Fantastic Four #247 |
| Lois London | 1982-10 | Danny Fingeroth, Frank Springer | Dazzler #20 |
| Monica Rambeau (Captain Marvel) | 1982-10 | Roger Stern, John Romita Jr. | Amazing Spider-Man Annual #16 |
| Obadiah Stane | 1982-10 | Dennis O'Neil, Luke McDonnell | Iron Man #163 |
| Power Princess | 1982-10 | J. M. DeMatteis, Don Perlin | Defenders #112 |
| Black Spectre (Carson Knowles) | 1982-11 | Doug Moench, Bill Sienkiewicz | Moon Knight #25 |
| Centurious | 1982-11 | J. M. DeMatteis, Bob Budiansky | Ghost Rider(vol. 2) #74 |
| Steel Spider | 1982-11 | Bill Mantlo, Ed Hannigan | The Spectacular Spider-Man #72 |
| William Stryker | 1982-11 | Chris Claremont, Brent Anderson | X-Men: God Loves, Man Kills #5 |
| Binary (Carol Danvers) | 1982-12 | Chris Claremont, Dave Cockrum | Uncanny X-Men #164 |
| Varnae | 1982-12 | Steve Perry, Steve Bissette | Bizarre Adventures #33 |
| Lockheed | 1983-02 | Chris Claremont, Paul Smith | Uncanny X-Men #166 |
| Megatak | 1983-02 | Doug Moench, Alan Kupperberg | Thor #328 |
| Hobgoblin | 1983-03 | Roger Stern, John Romita Jr. | The Amazing Spider-Man #238 |
| Morning Star | 1983-03 | Doug Moench, Bill Sienkiewicz | Moon Knight #29 |
| Crusader | 1983-04 | Alan Zelenetz, Bob Hall | Thor #330 |
| Madelyne Pryor | 1983-04 | Chris Claremont, Paul Smith | Uncanny X-Men #168 |
| Callisto | 1983-05 | Chris Claremont, Paul Smith | Uncanny X-Men #169 |
| Demon Bear | 1983-05 | Chris Claremont, Bob McLeod | New Mutants #3 |
| Donald Menken | 1983-05 | Roger Stern, John Romita Jr. | The Amazing Spider-Man #239 |
| Masque | 1983-05 | Chris Claremont, Paul Smith | Uncanny X-Men #169 |
| Morlocks | 1983-05 | Chris Claremont, Paul Smith | Uncanny X-Men #169 |
| Obnoxio the Clown | 1983-05 | Larry Hama, Alan Kupperberg | Obnoxio the Clown #1 |
| Plague (Morlock) | 1983-05 | Chris Claremont, Paul Smith | Uncanny X-Men #169 |
| Sunder | 1983-05 | Chris Claremont, Paul Smith | Uncanny X-Men #169 |
| Man-Elephant | 1983-06 | David Anthony Kraft, Ed Hannigan | Savage She-Hulk #17 |
| Tick-Tock | 1983-06 | Ann Nocenti, Brian Postman | Spider-Woman #50 |
| Lord Dark Wind | 1983-07 | Dennis O'Neil, Larry Hama, Klaus Janson | Daredevil #196 |
| White Rabbit | 1983-07 | J. M. DeMatteis, Kerry Gammill, Mike Esposito | Marvel Team-Up #131 |
| Beta Flight | 1983-08 | John Byrne | Alpha Flight #1 |
| Box | 1983-08 | John Byrne | Alpha Flight #1 |
| Diamond Lil | 1983-08 | John Byrne | Alpha Flight #1 |
| Flashback | 1983-08 | John Byrne | Alpha Flight #1 |
| Gamma Flight | 1983-08 | John Byrne | Alpha Flight #1 |
| Marrina Smallwood | 1983-08 | John Byrne | Alpha Flight #1 |
| Puck | 1983-08 | John Byrne | Alpha Flight #1 |
| Smart Alec | 1983-08 | John Byrne | Alpha Flight #1 |
| Tundra | 1983-08 | John Byrne | Alpha Flight #1 |
| Wild Child | 1983-08 | John Byrne | Alpha Flight #1 |
| Cloud | 1983-09 | J. M. DeMatteis, Don Perlin | Defenders #123 |
| Jerry Jaxon | 1983-09 | John Byrne | Alpha Flight #2 |
| Kate Waynesboro | 1983-09 | Bill Mantlo, Sal Buscema | Incredible Hulk #287 |
| Master of the World | 1983-09 | John Byrne | Alpha Flight #2 |
| Father Delgado | 1983-10 | Bill Mantlo, Rick Leonardi | Cloak and Dagger #1 |
| Magma | 1983-10 | Chris Claremont, Sal Buscema | New Mutants #8 |
| Beta Ray Bill | 1983-11 | Walt Simonson | Thor #337 |
| Bombshell | 1983-11 | Mark Gruenwald, Eliot Brown | Hawkeye #3 |
| Eitri | 1983-11 | Alan Zelenetz, Bob Hall | Mighty Thor Annual #11 |
| Oddball | 1983-11 | Mark Gruenwald, Eliot Brown | Hawkeye #3 |
| Selene (Black Queen) | 1983-11 | Chris Claremont, Sal Buscema | New Mutants #9 |
| Spider-Ham | 1983-11 | Tom DeFalco, Mark Armstrong | Marvel Tails Starring Peter Porker, the Spectacular Spider-Ham #1 |
| Gargantua | 1983-12 | Alan Kupperberg, J. M. DeMatteis | Defenders #126 |
| Healer | 1983-12 | Chris Claremont, Paul Smith | Uncanny X-Men #179 |
| Meggan | 1983-12 | Alan Moore, Alan Davis | The Mighty World of Marvel (vol. 2) #7 |
| Talisman | 1983-12 | John Byrne | Alpha Flight #5 |
| Valerie Cooper | 1983-12 | Chris Claremont, John Romita Jr. | Uncanny X-Men #176 |
| Lorelei (Asgardian) | 1984-01 | Walt Simonson | Mighty Thor #337 |
| Melissa Bowen | 1984-01 | Bill Mantlo, Rick Leonardi | Cloak and Dagger #4 |
| Otis and Adina Johnson | 1984-01 | Bill Mantlo, Rick Leonardi | Cloak and Dagger #4 |
| Sin | 1984-02 | J. M. DeMatteis, Paul Neary | Captain America #290 |
| Cypher | 1984-03 | Chris Claremont, Sal Buscema | New Mutants #13 |
| Delphine Courtney | 1984-03 | John Byrne | Alpha Flight #8 |
| Leech | 1984-03 | Chris Claremont, John Romita Jr. | Uncanny X-Men #179 |
| Black Crow | 1984-04 | J. M. DeMatteis, Paul Neary | Captain America #292 |
| Crazy Gang | 1984-04 | Alan Moore, Alan Davis | The Mighty World of Marvel (vol. 2) #11 |
| Magik | 1984-04 | Chris Claremont, Sal Buscema | New Mutants #14 |
| Amiko Kobayashi | 1984-05 | Chris Claremont, John Romita Jr. | Uncanny X-Men #181 |
| Battleworld | 1984-05 | Jim Shooter, Mike Zeck | Secret Wars #1 |
| Beyonder | 1984-05 | Jim Shooter, Mike Zeck | Secret Wars #1 |
| Mutant Registration Act | 1984-05 | | Uncanny X-Men #181 (Note: A "Mutant Control Act" is briefly mentioned in Uncanny X-Men #141 (Jan. 1981).) |
| Symbiotes (Klyntar) | 1984-05 | Jim Shooter, Mike Zeck | The Amazing Spider-Man #252 |
| Venom | 1984-05 | David Michelinie, Mike Zeck, Randy Schueller | The Amazing Spider-Man #252 |
| Walrus | 1984-05 | J. M. DeMatteis, Peter Gillis, Alan Kupperberg | Defenders #131 |
| Captain Britain Corps | 1984-06 | Alan Moore, Alan Davis | The Mighty World of Marvel (vol. 2) #13 |
| Catseye | 1984-06 | Chris Claremont, Sal Buscema | New Mutants #16 |
| Empath | 1984-06 | Chris Claremont, Sal Buscema | New Mutants #16 |
| Hellions | 1984-06 | Chris Claremont, Sal Buscema | New Mutants #16 |
| Jetstream | 1984-06 | Chris Claremont, Sal Buscema | New Mutants #16 |
| Malekith the Accursed | 1984-06 | Walt Simonson | Thor #344 |
| Rose | 1984-06 | Tom DeFalco | The Amazing Spider-Man #253 |
| Roulette | 1984-06 | Chris Claremont, Sal Buscema | New Mutants #16 |
| Tarot | 1984-06 | Chris Claremont, Sal Buscema | New Mutants #16 |
| Warpath | 1984-06 | Chris Claremont, Sal Buscema | New Mutants #16 (Note: Called himself Thunderbird after his deceased brother in his first appearances.) |
| Answer | 1984-07 | Al Milgrom | Peter Parker, the Spectacular Spider-Man #92 |
| Manslaughter | 1984-07 | Peter Gillis, Alan Kupperberg | Defenders #133 |
| Titania | 1984-07 | Jim Shooter, Mike Zeck | Secret Wars #3 |
| Volcana | 1984-07 | Jim Shooter, Mike Zeck | Secret Wars #3 |
| Black Fox (Raul Chalmers) | 1984-08 | Tom DeFalco, Ron Frenz | The Amazing Spider-Man #255 |
| Forge | 1984-08 | Chris Claremont, John Romita Jr. | Uncanny X-Men #184 |
| Julie Power | 1984-08 | Louise Simonson, June Brigman | Power Pack #1 |
| Magus | 1984-08 | Chris Claremont, Bill Sienkiewicz | New Mutants #18 |
| Power Pack | 1984-08 | Louise Simonson, June Brigman | Power Pack #1 |
| Terminus | 1984-08 | John Byrne | Fantastic Four #269 |
| Warlock | 1984-08 | Chris Claremont, Bill Sienkiewicz | New Mutants #18 |
| Zn'rx | 1984-08 | Louise Simonson, June Brigman | Power Pack #1 |
| Kurse (Algrim) | 1984-09 | Walt Simonson | Thor #347 (Note: First named Algrim, not called Kurse until Secret Wars II #4 (Oct. 1985).) |
| Puma | 1984-09 | Tom DeFalco, Ron Frenz | The Amazing Spider-Man #256 |
| Sharon Friedlander | 1984-09 | Chris Claremont, Bill Sienkiewicz | New Mutants #19 |
| Tom Corsi | 1984-09 | Chris Claremont, Bill Sienkiewicz | New Mutants #19 |
| Vibro | 1984-09 | Denny O'Neil, Luke McDonnell | Iron Man #186 |
| West Coast Avengers | 1984-09 | Roger Stern, Bob Hall | West Coast Avengers #1 |
| Termite | 1984-10 | Denny O'Neil, Luke McDonnell | Iron Man #189 |
| Thunderclap | 1984-10 | Mike Collins, Barry Kitson | Spider-Man Weekly #607 |
| Lila Cheney | 1984-11 | Chris Claremont, Bob McLeod | New Mutants Annual #1 |
| Husk | 1984-11 | Bill Mantlo, William Johnson, Fabian Nicieza, Tony Daniel | Rom Annual #3 |
| Icarus | 1984-11 | Bill Mantlo, William Johnson | Rom Annual #3 |
| Iron Man 2020 (Arno Stark) | 1984-11 | Tom DeFalco, Herb Trimpe | Machine Man 2020 #2 |
| Jebediah Guthrie | 1984-11 | Bill Mantlo, William Johnson | Rom Annual #3 |
| Madison Jeffries | 1984-11 | John Byrne | Alpha Flight #16 |
| Nathaniel Richards | 1984-11 | John Byrne | Fantastic Four #272 |
| Ogun | 1984-11 | Chris Claremont, Al Milgrom | Kitty Pryde and Wolverine #1 |
| Spider-Woman (Julia Carpenter) | 1984-11 | Jim Shooter, Mike Zeck | Secret Wars #7 |
| Adversary | 1984-12 | Chris Claremont, John Romita Jr. | Uncanny X-Men #188 |
| Dragon of the Moon | 1984-12 | Peter B. Gillis, Don Perlin | Defenders #138 |
| Friedrich von Roehm (Black Rook) | 1984-12 | Chris Claremont, Bill Sienkiewicz | New Mutants #22 |
| Spot | 1985-01 | Al Milgrom, Herb Trimpe | The Spectacular Spider-Man #98 (Note: The Spot's alter ego, Jonathan Ohnn, first appeared in Spectacular Spider-Man #97 (Dec. 1984).) |
| Machete | 1985-02 | Mike Carlin, Paul Neary | Captain America #302 |
| Sat-Yr-9 | 1985-02 | Alan Davis | Captain Britain (vol. 2) #2 |
| Andromeda | 1985-03 | Peter B. Gillis, Don Perlin, Kim DeMulder | Defenders #143 |
| Legion | 1985-03 | Chris Claremont, Bill Sienkiewicz | New Mutants #25 |
| Nimrod | 1985-03 | Chris Claremont, John Romita Jr. | Uncanny X-Men #191 |
| Oblivion | 1985-03 | J. M. DeMatteis, Alan Kupperberg | Iceman #3 |
| Piper | 1985-03 | Louise Simonson, June Brigman | Power Pack #11 |
| Shadowcat | 1985-03 | Chris Claremont, Al Milgrom | Kitty Pryde and Wolverine #5 (Note: Kitty Pryde debuted in Uncanny X-Men #129 (Jan. 1980) but did not adopt her "Shadowcat" identity until this issue.) |
| Normie Osborn | 1985-04 | Bill Mantlo, Al Milgrom | The Amazing Spider-Man #263 |
| Royal Roy | 1985-04 | Lennie Herman, Warren Kremer | Royal Roy: A Prince of a Boy #1 |
| Technet | 1985-04 | Alan Davis | Captain Britain (vol. 2) #4 |
| Pink Pearl | 1985-05 | John Byrne | Alpha Flight #22 |
| Runner | 1985-05 | Peter B. Gillis, Don Perlin | Defenders #143 |
| Scourge of the Underworld | 1985-05 | Mark Gruenwald, John Byrne | Iron Man #194 |
| Fenris | 1985-06 | Chris Claremont, John Romita Jr. | Uncanny X-Men #194 |
| Silver Sable | 1985-06 | Tom DeFalco, Ron Frenz, Josef Rubinstein | Amazing Spider-Man #265 |
| Wild Pack | 1985-06 | Tom DeFalco, Ron Frenz, Josef Rubinstein | Amazing Spider-Man #265 |
| Annalee | 1985-07 | Louise Simonson, June Brigman | Power Pack #12 |
| Ape | 1985-07 | Louise Simonson, June Brigman | Power Pack #12 |
| Beautiful Dreamer | 1985-07 | Louise Simonson, June Brigman | Power Pack #12 |
| Erg | 1985-07 | Louise Simonson, June Brigman | Power Pack #12 |
| Madcap | 1985-07 | Mark Gruenwald, Paul Neary | Captain America #307 |
| Nebula | 1985-07 | Roger Stern, John Buscema | Avengers #257 |
| Strong Guy | 1985-07 | Chris Claremont, Bill Sienkiewicz | New Mutants #29 |
| Tar Baby | 1985-07 | Louise Simonson, June Brigman | Power Pack #12 |
| Armadillo | 1985-08 | Mark Gruenwald, Paul Neary, Dennis Janke | Captain America #308 |
| Blue Eagle | 1985-09 | | Squadron Supreme #1 (Note: Blue Eagle first appeared in the identity of American Eagle in The Avengers #85 (Feb. 1971).) |
| Longshot | 1985-09 | Ann Nocenti, Art Adams | Longshot #1 |
| Sharon Ventura (She-Thing) | 1985-09 | Mike Carlin, Ron Wilson | Thing #27 |
| Spiral | 1985-09 | Ann Nocenti, Art Adams | Longshot #1 |
| Asp | 1985-10 | Mark Gruenwald, Paul Neary | Captain America #310 |
| Bushmaster (Quincy McIver) | 1985-10 | Mark Gruenwald, Paul Neary | Captain America #310 |
| Cottonmouth | 1985-10 | Mark Gruenwald, Paul Neary | Captain America #310 |
| Demolition Man (D-Man) | 1985-10 | Mike Carlin, Ron Wilson | Thing #28 |
| Diamondback (Rachel Leighton) | 1985-10 | Mark Gruenwald, Paul Neary | Captain America #310 |
| Madripoor | 1985-10 | Chris Claremont, Steve Leialoha | New Mutants #32 |
| Phastos | 1985-10 | Peter Gillis, Sal Buscema | Eternals (vol. 2) #1 |
| Rattler | 1985-10 | Mark Gruenwald, Paul Neary | Captain America #310 |
| Serpent Society | 1985-10 | Mark Gruenwald, Paul Neary | Captain America #310 |
| Sin-Eater | 1985-10 | Peter David, Rich Buckler | Peter Parker, the Spectacular Spider-Man #107 |
| Unlimited Class Wrestling Federation | 1985-10 | Mike Carlin, Ron Wilson | Thing #28 |
| Alistair Smythe | 1985-11 | Louise Simonson, Mary Wilshire | Amazing Spider-Man Annual #19 |
| Boom-Boom | 1985-11 | Jim Shooter, Al Milgrom | Secret Wars II #5 |
| Freedom Force | 1985-11 | Chris Claremont, John Romita Jr. | Uncanny X-Men #199 |
| Ghaur | 1985-11 | Peter B. Gillis, Sal Buscema | Eternals (vol. 2) #2 |
| Iron Monger | 1985-11 | Dennis O'Neil | Iron Man #200 (Note: Iron Monger's alter ego Obadiah Stane first appears in Iron Man #163 (Oct. 1982).) |
| Mojo | 1985-11 | Ann Nocenti, Art Adams | Longshot #3 |
| Roger Dooley | 1985-11 | John Byrne | Marvel Graphic Novel #18 |
| Flag-Smasher | 1985-12 | Mark Gruenwald, Paul Neary | Captain America #312 |
| Hrimhari | 1985-12 | Chris Claremont, Art Adams | New Mutants Special Edition #1 |
| Institute of Evil | 1986-01 | Mark Gruenwald, Bob Hall | Squadron Supreme #5 |
| Master Pandemonium | 1986-01 | Steve Englehart, Al Milgrom | West Coast Avengers #4 |
| Quagmire | 1986-01 | Mark Gruenwald, Bob Hall | Squadron Supreme #5 |
| Scramble | 1986-01 | Bill Mantlo, Mike Mignola | Alpha Flight #30 |
| Shape | 1986-01 | Mark Gruenwald, Bob Hall | Squadron Supreme #5 |
| Slyde | 1986-01 | Tom DeFalco, Sal Buscema | The Amazing Spider-Man #272 |
| Cameron Hodge | 1986-02 | Bob Layton, Jackson Guice | X-Factor #1 |
| James Wesley | 1986-02 | Frank Miller, David Mazzucchelli | Daredevil #227 |
| Master Menace | 1986-02 | | Squadron Supreme #6 (Note: First appeared as Dr. Emil Burbank in Thor #280 (Feb. 1979).) |
| Rusty Collins (Firefist) | 1986-02 | Bob Layton, Jackson Guice | X-Factor #1 |
| Throg | 1986-02 | Walt Simonson | Thor #364 (Note: First appeared as Puddlegulp, not named Throg until Mighty Thor #700 (Dec. 2017).) |
| X-Factor | 1986-02 | Bob Layton, Jackson Guice | X-Factor #1 |
| Yellowjacket (Rita DeMara) | 1986-02 | Roger Stern, John Buscema | Avengers #264 |
| Artie Maddicks | 1986-03 | Bob Layton, Jackson Guice | X-Factor #2 |
| Gladiatrix | 1986-03 | Mike Carlin, Ron Wilson | Thing #33 |
| Mayhem | 1986-03 | Bill Mantlo, Rick Leonardi | Cloak and Dagger (vol. 2) #5 (Note: Mayhem's alternate identity Brigid O'Reilly first appeared earlier in Cloak and Dagger #1 (Oct. 1983).) |
| Tower | 1986-03 | Bob Layton, Jackson Guice | X-Factor #2 |
| Death-Throws | 1986-05 | Mark Gruenwald, Paul Neary | Captain America #315 |
| Frenzy | 1986-05 | Bob Layton, Keith Pollard | X-Factor #4 |
| Glow Worm | 1986-05 | Jim Owsley, Mark Bright, Jerry Acerno | Power Man and Iron Fist #123 |
| Lady Deathstrike | 1986-05 | Dennis O'Neil, Larry Hama, Bill Mantlo, Sal Buscema, Chris Claremont, Barry Windsor-Smith | Alpha Flight #33 (Note: Lady Deathstrike's other identity Yuriko Oyama first appeared in Daredevil #197 (Aug. 1983).) |
| Ms. Marvel (Sharon Ventura) | 1986-05 | Mike Carlin, Paul Neary | Thing #35 (Note: Sharon first appeared in The Thing #27 (Sep. 1985) prior to becoming Ms. Marvel.) |
| Redstone | 1986-05 | Mark Gruenwald | Squadron Supreme #9 |
| Alliance of Evil | 1986-06 | Bob Layton, Jackson Guice | X-Factor #5 |
| Apocalypse | 1986-06 | Louise Simonson, Jackson Guice | X-Factor #5 |
| Chance | 1986-06 | David Michelinie, Mike Harris | Web of Spider-Man #15 |
| Dakota North | 1986-06 | Martha Thomases, Tony Salmons | Dakota North #1 |
| Haywire | 1986-06 | Mark Gruenwald, Paul Ryan | Squadron Supreme #10 |
| Inertia | 1986-06 | Mark Gruenwald, Paul Ryan | Squadron Supreme #10 |
| Moonglow | 1986-06 | Mark Gruenwald, Paul Ryan | Squadron Supreme #10 |
| Stinger | 1986-06 | Bob Layton, Jackson Guice | X-Factor #5 |
| Thermite | 1986-06 | Mark Gruenwald, Paul Ryan | Squadron Supreme #10 |
| Foreigner | 1986-07 | Peter David | The Spectacular Spider-Man #116 (Note: Foreigner's voice first appeared via telephone in Web of Spider-Man #15 (June 1986).) |
| Headlok | 1986-07 | Steve Englehart, Al Milgrom | West Coast Avengers #10 |
| Nuke | 1986-07 | Frank Miller, David Mazzucchelli | Daredevil #232 |
| Pestilence | 1986-07 | Bill Mantlo, David Ross | Alpha Flight #36 |
| Tommy | 1986-07 | Chris Claremont, John Romita Jr. | Uncanny X-Men #210 |
| Cybelle | 1986-08 | Chris Claremont, John Romita Jr., Bret Blevins | Uncanny X-Men #211 |
| Ecstasy | 1986-08 | Peter B. Gillis | Doctor Strange, Master of the Mystic Arts #78 |
| Skids | 1986-08 | Louise Simonson, Jackson Guice | X-Factor #7 |
| Trish Tilby | 1986-08 | Louise Simonson, Jackson Guice | X-Factor #7 |
| Eddie Brock | 1986-09 | David Michelinie, Todd McFarlane | Web of Spider-Man #18 |
| John Garrett | 1986-09 | Frank Miller, Bill Sienkiewicz | Elektra: Assassin #2 |
| TESS-One | 1986-09 | Mark Gruenwald, Mike Zeck | Captain America Annual #8 |
| Arclight | 1986-10 | Chris Claremont | Uncanny X-Men #210 |
| Humbug | 1986-10 | David Michelinie, Marc Silvestri | Web of Spider-Man #19 |
| Malice (Marauder) | 1986-10 | Chris Claremont | Uncanny X-Men #210 |
| Marauders | 1986-10 | Chris Claremont | Uncanny X-Men #210 |
| Psylocke (Betsy Braddock) | 1986-10 | Chris Claremont, Alan Davis | First appeared as Betsy Braddock in Captain Britain Weekly #8. |
| Riptide | 1986-10 | Chris Claremont | Uncanny X-Men #210 |
| Scalphunter | 1986-10 | Chris Claremont | Uncanny X-Men #210 |
| Scrambler | 1986-10 | Chris Claremont | Uncanny X-Men #210 |
| Solo | 1986-10 | David Michelinie, Marc Silvestri | Web of Spider-Man #19 |
| Spitfire | 1986-10 | Eliot R. Brown, Jack Morelli | Spitfire and the Troubleshooters #1 |
| Star Brand | 1986-10 | Jim Shooter | Star Brand #1 |
| Time Variance Authority | 1986-10 | Walt Simonson, Sal Buscema | Thor #372 |
| Vault | 1986-10 | Danny Fingeroth, Steve Ditko | Avengers Annual #15 |
| All-American | 1986-11 | Tom DeFalco, Ron Frenz | Kickers, Inc. #1 |
| Battlestar | 1986-11 | Mark Gruenwald, Paul Neary | Captain America #323 |
| Left-Winger | 1986-11 | Mark Gruenwald, Paul Neary | Captain America #323 |
| Mark Hazzard | 1986-11 | Archie Goodwin, Peter David, Gray Morrow | Mark Hazzard: Merc #1 |
| Nightmask | 1986-11 | Archie Goodwin | Nightmask #1 |
| Psi-Force | 1986-11 | Archie Goodwin, Walt Simonson | Psi-Force #1 |
| Right-Winger | 1986-11 | Mark Gruenwald, Paul Neary | Captain America #323 |
| Persuasion | 1986-12 | Bill Mantlo, David Ross | Alpha Flight #41 |
| Rintrah | 1986-12 | Peter B. Gillis, Chris Warner | Doctor Strange #80 |
| Scaleface | 1986-12 | Louise Simonson, Walt Simonson | X-Factor #11 |
| War | 1986-12 | Louise Simonson, Walt Simonson | X-Factor #11 |
| Excalibur | 1987 | Chris Claremont, Alan Davis | Excalibur: The Sword is Drawn |
| Warwolves | 1987 | Chris Claremont, Alan Davis | Excalibur: The Sword is Drawn |
| Slug | 1987-01 | Mark Gruenwald, Paul Neary | Captain America #325 |
| Ariel | 1987-02 | Jo Duffy, Kerry Gammill | Fallen Angels #1 |
| Comet Man | 1987-02 | Bill Mumy, Miguel Ferrer, Kelley Jones | Comet Man #1 |
| Crimson Commando | 1987-03 | Chris Claremont, Alan Davis | Uncanny X-Men #215 |
| Elves | 1987-03 | | Thor #344 |
| Manikin | 1987-03 | Bill Mantlo, Dave Ross | Alpha Flight #44 |
| Otis Johnson Jr. | 1987-03 | Bill Mantlo, June Brigman | Cloak and Dagger (vol. 2) #11 |
| Stonewall | 1987-03 | Chris Claremont, Alan Davis | Uncanny X-Men #215 |
| Super Sabre | 1987-03 | Chris Claremont, Alan Davis | Uncanny X-Men #215 |
| Fallen Angels | 1987-04 | Mary Jo Duffy, Kerry Gammill | Fallen Angels #1 |
| Horsemen of Apocalypse | 1987-04 | Louise Simonson, Walt Simonson | X-Factor #15 |
| Lord of Light | 1987-04 | Bill Mantlo, Bret Blevins | Strange Tales (vol. 2) #1 |
| Death's Head | 1987-05 | Simon Furman, Geoff Senior | Transformers UK #113 |
| Ghost | 1987-06 | David Michelinie, Bob Layton | Iron Man #219 |
| Rictor | 1987-06 | Louise Simonson, Walt Simonson | X-Factor #17 |
| The Right (organization) | 1987-06 | Louise Simonson, Walt Simonson | X-Factor #17 |
| Archangel | 1987-08 | Louise Simonson, Walt Simonson | X-Factor #19 (Note: Called "Death" in first appearances, he is not dubbed "Archangel" until X-Factor #38 (March 1989).) |
| Prometheus | 1987-08 | Roger Stern, John Buscema | Avengers #282 |
| Trash | 1987-08 | Louise Simonson, John Bogdanove | Power Pack #31 |
| Mister Sinister | 1987-09 | Chris Claremont, Marc Silvestri | Uncanny X-Men #221 |
| Bird-Brain | 1987-10 | Louise Simonson, June Brigman | New Mutants #58 |
| Obliterator | 1987-10 | Steve Englehart, Marshall Rogers | Silver Surfer (vol. 3) #4 |
| Bushwacker | 1987-11 | Ann Nocenti, Rick Leonardi | Daredevil #248 |
| Four Freedoms Plaza | 1987-11 | | Fantastic Four #296 |
| Microchip | 1987-11 | Mike Baron, Klaus Janson | Punisher (vol. 2) #4 |
| Mister Jip | 1987-11 | Terry Austin, Bret Blevins | Strange Tales #8 |
| Rev | 1987-11 | Mike Baron, Klaus Janson | Punisher (vol. 2) #4 |
| Watchdogs | 1987-11 | Mark Gruenwald, Tom Morgan | Captain America #335 |
| Leir | 1987-12 | Tom DeFalco, Ron Frenz | Thor #386 |
| Pathway | 1987-12 | Bill Mantlo, Jim Lee | Alpha Flight #53 |
| Trick Shot | 1987-12 | Tom DeFalco, Mark Bright | Solo Avengers #1 |
| Ani-Mator | 1988-01 | Louise Simonson, Bret Blevins | New Mutants #59 |
| Black Racer | 1988-01 | Mark Gruenwald, Tom Morgan | Captain America #337 |
| Bullet | 1988-01 | Ann Nocenti, John Romita Jr. | Daredevil #250 |
| Fer-de-Lance | 1988-01 | Mark Gruenwald, Tom Morgan | Captain America #337 |
| Puff Adder | 1988-01 | Mark Gruenwald, Tom Morgan | Captain America #337 |
| Speedball | 1988-01 | Tom DeFalco, Steve Ditko | Amazing Spider-Man Annual #22 |
| Carlton Drake | 1988-03 | David Michelinie, Todd McFarlane | The Amazing Spider-Man #298 |
| Dreamqueen | 1988-03 | Bill Mantlo, Jim Lee | Alpha Flight #56 |
| Tombstone | 1988-03 | Gerry Conway, Alex Saviuk | Web of Spider-Man #36 |
| Grog | 1988-04 | Tom DeFalco, Ron Frenz | Thor #390 |
| Bonebreaker | 1988-05 | Chris Claremont, Marc Silvestri | Uncanny X-Men #229 |
| Boomslang | 1988-05 | Mark Gruenwald, Kieron Dwyer | Captain America #341 |
| Coachwhip | 1988-05 | Mark Gruenwald, Kieron Dwyer | Captain America #341 |
| Firepower | 1988-05 | David Michelinie, Bob Layton, Mark Bright | Iron Man #230 |
| Gateway | 1988-05 | Chris Claremont, Marc Silvestri | Uncanny X-Men #229 |
| Infectia | 1988-05 | Louise Simonson, Walt Simonson | X-Factor #28 |
| Mongoose | 1988-05 | Tom DeFalco, Ron Frenz | Thor #391 (Note: Mongoose first appeared in shadow in The Amazing Spider-Man #283 (Dec. 1986).) |
| Reavers | 1988-05 | Chris Claremont, Marc Silvestri | Uncanny X-Men #229 |
| Reptyl | 1988-05 | Steve Englehart, Joe Staton | Silver Surfer (vol. 3) #11 |
| Rock Python | 1988-05 | Mark Gruenwald, Kieron Dwyer | Captain America #341 |
| Skullbuster | 1988-05 | Marc Silvestri, Chris Claremont | Uncanny X-Men #229 |
| Thunderstrike (Eric Masterson) | 1988-05 | Tom DeFalco, Ron Frenz | Thor #391 |
| Tyger Tiger | 1988-05 | Chris Claremont, Marc Silvestri | Uncanny X-Men #229 |
| Thunderstrike (Kevin Masterson) | 1988-06 | Tom DeFalco, Ron Frenz | Thor #392 |
| Typhoid Mary | 1988-06 | Ann Nocenti, John Romita Jr. | Daredevil #254 |
| Damage Control | 1988-06 | Dwayne McDuffie, Ernie Colón | Marvel Age Annual #4 |
| Jade Dragon | 1988-06 | Bill Mantlo, Jim Lee | Alpha Flight #59 |
| Quicksand | 1988-06 | Tom DeFalco, Ron Frenz | Thor #392 |
| Nanny | 1988-07 | Louise Simonson, Walt Simonson | X-Factor #30 |
| Ogress | 1988-07 | Peter David, Todd McFarlane | Incredible Hulk #345 |
| Al MacKenzie | 1988-08 | Bob Harras, Paul Neary | Nick Fury vs. S.H.I.E.L.D. #3 |
| Alexander Pierce | 1988-08 | Bob Harras, Paul Neary | Nick Fury vs. S.H.I.E.L.D. #3 |
| Gosamyr | 1988-08 | Louise Simonson, Bret Blevins | New Mutants #66 |
| Orphan-Maker | 1988-08 | Louise Simonson, Walt Simonson | X-Factor #31 |
| Bengal | 1988-09 | Fabian Nicieza, Ron Lim | Daredevil #258 |
| Earth Force | 1988-09 | Tom DeFalco, Ron Frenz | Thor #395 |
| Marlo Chandler | 1988-09 | Peter David | Incredible Hulk #347 |
| MODAM | 1988-09 | Steve Englehart, Al Milgrom | West Coast Avengers #36 |
| David Moreau (Genegineer) | 1988-10 | Chris Claremont, Marc Silvestri | Uncanny X-Men #236 |
| Genosha | 1988-10 | Chris Claremont, Rick Leonardi | Uncanny X-Men #235 |
| Kylun | 1988-10 | Chris Claremont, Alan Davis | Excalibur #2 |
| Lobo Brothers | 1988-10 | Gerry Conway, Sal Buscema | The Spectacular Spider-Man #143 |
| N'astirh | 1988-10 | Louise Simonson, Jon Bogdanove | X-Factor #32 |
| Poison | 1988-10 | Steve Gerber, Cynthia Martin | Web of Spider-Man Annual #4 |
| Wiz Kid | 1988-10 | Louise Simonson, Jon Bogdanove | X-Terminators #1 |
| X-Babies | 1988-10 | Chris Claremont, Art Adams | Uncanny X-Men Annual #12 (Note: The X-Men had previously been reduced in age in Uncanny X-Men Annual #10 (Jan. 1987) which likely inspired the X-Babies.) |
| Sapphire Styx | 1988-11 | Chris Claremont, John Buscema, Klaus Janson | Marvel Comics Presents #1 |
| Solarman | 1989-01 | David Oliphant, Deborah Kalman | Solarman #1 (Note: First appeared in Solarman #1: The Beginning (1979) by Pendulum Press, revived in 1989 by Marvel.) |
| Archie Corrigan | 1989-02 | Chris Claremont, John Buscema | Wolverine (vol. 2) #4 |
| Bloodscream | 1989-02 | Chris Claremont, John Buscema | Wolverine (vol. 2) #4 |
| Roughouse | 1989-02 | Chris Claremont, John Buscema | Wolverine (vol. 2) #4 |
| Landau, Luckman, and Lake | 1989-03 | Chris Claremont | Wolverine (vol. 2) #5 |
| Ramonda | 1989-03 | Don McGregor, Gene Colan | Marvel Comics Presents #14 |
| Supernova (Nova Omega) | 1989-03 | Tom DeFalco | Avengers #301 |
| Fantasia | 1989-04 | Mark Gruenwald, Kieron Dwyer | Captain America #352 |
| Perun | 1989-04 | Mark Gruenwald, Kieron Dwyer | Captain America #352 |
| Sputnik | 1989-04 | Mark Gruenwald, Kieron Dwyer | Captain America #352 |
| Supreme Soviets | 1989-04 | Mark Gruenwald, Kieron Dwyer | Captain America #352 |
| Jubilee | 1989-05 | Chris Claremont, Marc Silvestri | Uncanny X-Men #244 |
| Alchemy | 1989-06 | Paul Betsow | X-Factor #41 |
| Llan the Sorcerer | 1989-06 | James Hudnall, John Calimee | Alpha Flight #71 |
| Portal | 1989-06 | Danny Fingeroth, Rich Buckler | Avengers #304 |
| U.S. Agent | 1989-06 | Mark Gruenwald, Kieron Dwyer | Captain America #354 (Note: John Walker first appeared as Super-Patriot in Captain America #323 (Nov. 1986).) |
| Big Bertha | 1989-07 | John Byrne | West Coast Avengers (vol. 2) #46 |
| Dinah Soar | 1989-07 | John Byrne | West Coast Avengers (vol. 2) #46 |
| Doorman | 1989-07 | John Byrne | West Coast Avengers (vol. 2) #46 |
| Flatman | 1989-07 | John Byrne | West Coast Avengers (vol. 2) #46 |
| Great Lakes Avengers | 1989-07 | John Byrne | West Coast Avengers (vol. 2) #46 |
| Mister Immortal | 1989-07 | John Byrne | West Coast Avengers (vol. 2) #46 |
| Witchfire | 1989-07 | James Hudnall, John Calimee | Alpha Flight #76 |
| Alfie O'Meagan | 1989-08 | Larry Hama | Marvel Comics Presents #25 |
| Coldblood | 1989-08 | Doug Moench, Paul Gulacy | Marvel Comics Presents #26 |
| Silver Fox | 1989-08 | Chris Claremont, John Buscema | Wolverine (vol. 2) #10 |
| Blackheart | 1989-09 | Ann Nocenti, John Romita Sr. | Daredevil #270 |
| Midnight (Jeff Wilde) | 1989-09 | Chuck Dixon, Russ Heath | Marc Spector: Moon Knight #4 |
| Werner von Strucker | 1989-09 | Bob Harras | Nick Fury, Agent of S.H.I.E.L.D. (vol. 2) #1 |
| Crossbones | 1989-10 | Mark Gruenwald, Kieron Dwyer | Captain America #359 |
| Shotgun | 1989-10 | Ann Nocenti, John Romita Jr. | Daredevil #271 |
| Geist | 1989-11 | Archie Goodwin | Wolverine #17 |
| Powderkeg | 1989-11 | Dwayne McDuffie, Mark Bright | Captain Marvel (vol. 2) #1 |
| Andrew Chord | 1989-12 | Tom DeFalco, Ron Frenz | Thor #411 |
| Madman | 1989-12 | Peter David, Jeff Purves | Incredible Hulk #364 (Note: Madman's alter ego Phil Sterns appeared in the previous issue, Incredible Hulk #363 (Dec. 1989).) |
| Matsu'o Tsurayaba | 1989-12 | Chris Claremont, Marc Silvestri | Uncanny X-Men #255 |
| Mole | 1989-12 | Louise Simonson, Terry Shoemaker | X-Factor #51 |
| New Warriors | 1989-12 | Tom DeFalco, Ron Frenz | Mighty Thor #411 |
| Night Thrasher | 1989-12 | Tom DeFalco, Ron Frenz | Mighty Thor #411 |
| Tai | 1989-12 | Tom DeFalco, Ron Frenz | Mighty Thor #411 |
| Charlotte Jones | 1990-02 | Louise Simonson, Terry Shoemaker | X-Factor #51 |
| Forearm | 1990-02 | Louise Simonson, Rob Liefeld | New Mutants #86 |
| Mutant Liberation Front | 1990-02 | Louise Simonson, Rob Liefeld | New Mutants #86 |
| Strobe | 1990-02 | Louise Simonson, Rob Liefeld | New Mutants #86 |
| Stryfe | 1990-02 | Louise Simonson, Rob Liefeld | New Mutants #86 |
| Techno-organic virus | 1990-02 | Louise Simonson, Rob Liefeld | New Mutants #86 |
| Tempo | 1990-02 | Louise Simonson, Rob Liefeld | New Mutants #86 |
| Thumbelina | 1990-02 | Louise Simonson, Rob Liefeld | New Mutants #86 |
| Zero (ADAM Unit) | 1990-02 | Louise Simonson, Rob Liefeld | New Mutants #86 |
| Cable | 1990-03 | Louise Simonson, Rob Liefeld | New Mutants #87 |
| Captain Atlas | 1990-04 | Mark Gruenwald, Mike Manley | Quasar #9 |
| Pantheon | 1990-04 | Peter David | Incredible Hulk #368 |
| Deathwatch | 1990-05 | Howard Mackie, Javier Saltares | Ghost Rider (vol. 3) #1 |
| Ghost Rider (Danny Ketch) | 1990-05 | Howard Mackie, Javier Saltares | Ghost Rider (vol. 3) #1 |
| Stacy Dolan | 1990-05 | Howard Mackie, Javier Saltares | Ghost Rider (vol. 3) #1 |
| Blackout (Lilin) | 1990-06 | Howard Mackie, Javier Saltares | Ghost Rider (vol. 3) #2 |
| Lifeform | 1990-06 | Mike Baron, Neil Hansen | Punisher Annual #3 |
| Taserface | 1990-06 | Aaron Valentino, Jim Valentino | Guardians of the Galaxy #1 |
| Ahab | 1990-07 | Walt Simonson, Jackson Guice | Fantastic Four Annual #23 |
| Bloodwraith | 1990-07 | Mark Gruenwald, Dann Thomas, Roy Thomas, Tony DeZuniga | Black Knight #2 |
| Knights of Pendragon | 1990-07 | Dan Abnett, John Tomlinson, Gary Erskine | Knights of Pendragon #1 |
| Gambit | 1990-08 | Chris Claremont, Jim Lee | Uncanny X-Men Annual #14 |
| Midnight's Fire | 1990-08 | Fabian Nicieza, Mark Bagley | New Warriors #2 |
| Silhouette | 1990-08 | Fabian Nicieza, Mark Bagley | New Warriors #2 |
| Dragoness | 1990-09 | Louise Simonson, Rob Liefeld | New Mutants #93 |
| Kamikaze | 1990-09 | Louise Simonson, Rob Liefeld | New Mutants #93 |
| Femme Fatales | 1990-10 | Erik Larsen, David Michelinie | The Amazing Spider-Man #340 |
| Living Lightning | 1990-10 | Roy Thomas, Dann Thomas, Paul Ryan | Avengers West Coast #63 |
| Pretty Persuasions | 1990-10 | Fabian Nicieza, Mark Bagley | New Warriors #4 |
| Psionex | 1990-10 | Fabian Nicieza, Mark Bagley | New Warriors #4 |
| Code: Blue | 1990-11 | Tom DeFalco, Ron Frenz | Mighty Thor #426 |
| Rage | 1990-11 | Larry Hama, Paul Ryan | Avengers #326 |
| Siege (John Kelly) | 1990-11 | Dwayne McDuffie, Gregory Wright | Marvel Comics Presents #62 |
| Force of Nature | 1991-01 | Fabian Nicieza, Mark Bagley | New Warriors #7 |
| Guilt Hulk | 1991-01 | Peter David, Dale Keown | Incredible Hulk #377 |
| Rancor | 1991-01 | Jim Valentino | Guardians of the Galaxy #8 |
| Silk Fever | 1991-01 | Fabian Nicieza, Mark Bagley | New Warriors #7 |
| Cardiac | 1991-02 | David Michelinie, Erik Larsen | The Amazing Spider-Man #344 (Note: Cardiac's alter ego Elias Wirtham first appeared in The Amazing Spider-Man #342 (Dec. 1990).) |
| Deadpool | 1991-02 | Rob Liefeld, Fabian Nicieza | New Mutants #98 |
| Domino | 1991-02 | Fabian Nicieza, Rob Liefeld | New Mutants #98 |
| Gideon | 1991-02 | Fabian Nicieza, Rob Liefeld | New Mutants #98 |
| Replica | 1991-02 | Jim Valentino | Guardians of the Galaxy #9 |
| Starlight | 1991-02 | Steve Gerber, Sal Buscema | Quasar #19 (Note: First appeared as Red Guardian in The Defenders #35 (May 1976).) |
| Abraham Cornelius | 1991-03 | Barry Windsor-Smith | Marvel Comics Presents #73 |
| Ajax (Pantheon) | 1991-03 | Peter David, Dale Keown | Incredible Hulk #379 |
| Albert | 1991-03 | Larry Hama, Marc Silvestri | Wolverine (vol. 2) #37 |
| Carol Hines | 1991-03 | Barry Windsor-Smith | Marvel Comics Presents #72 |
| Darkhawk | 1991-03 | Danny Fingeroth, Mike Manley | Darkhawk #1 |
| Elsie-Dee | 1991-03 | Larry Hama, Marc Silvestri | Wolverine (vol. 2) #37 |
| Feral | 1991-03 | Fabian Nicieza, Rob Liefeld | New Mutants #99 |
| Hector | 1991-03 | Peter David, Dale Keown | Incredible Hulk #379 |
| NFL SuperPro | 1991-03 | Fabian Nicieza, José Delbo | NFL SuperPro Special Edition #1 |
| Professor Thorton (Truett Hudson) | 1991-03 | Barry Windsor-Smith | Marvel Comics Presents #72 |
| Shatterstar | 1991-03 | Fabian Nicieza, Rob Liefeld | New Mutants #99 |
| Dark Riders | 1991-04 | Chris Claremont, Jim Lee, Whilce Portacio | X-Factor #65 |
| Tusk | 1991-04 | Chris Claremont, Jim Lee, Whilce Portacio | X-Factor #65 |
| Windshear | 1991-04 | Fabian Nicieza, Michael Bair | Alpha Flight #87 |
| X-Force | 1991-04 | Rob Liefeld | New Mutants #100 |
| Crippler | 1991-05 | Gregory Wright, Jackson Guice | Daredevil Annual #7 |
| Leila Davis | 1991-05 | Danny Fingeroth, Kerry Gammill, Al Milgrom | Deadly Foes of Spider-Man #1 |
| Savage Steel | 1991-06 | Danny Fingeroth, Mike Manley | Darkhawk #4 |
| Shinobi Shaw | 1991-06 | Chris Claremont | X-Factor #67 |
| Sleepwalker | 1991-06 | Bob Budiansky, Bret Blevins | Sleepwalker #1 |
| Spirit of Vengeance | 1991-06 | Jim Valentino | Guardians of the Galaxy #13 |
| 8-Ball | 1991-07 | Bob Budiansky, Bret Blevins | Sleepwalker #2 |
| Ashley Kafka | 1991-07 | J. M. DeMatteis, Sal Buscema | The Spectacular Spider-Man #178 |
| Hauptmann Deutschland | 1991-07 | Mark Gruenwald, Rik Levins | Captain America #387 |
| Infinity | 1991-07 | Mark Gruenwald, Greg Capullo | Quasar #24 |
| Krugarr | 1991-07 | Jim Valentino | Guardians of the Galaxy Annual #1 |
| Superia | 1991-07 | Mark Gruenwald, Rik Levins | Captain America #387 |
| G.W. Bridge | 1991-08 | Fabian Nicieza, Rob Liefeld | X-Force #1 |
| Phobos | 1991-08 | Roy Thomas, Jean-Marc Lofficier | Doctor Strange, Sorcerer Supreme #32 |
| Protégé | 1991-08 | Jim Valentino | Guardians of the Galaxy #15 |
| Cyber | 1991-09 | Peter David, Sam Kieth | Marvel Comics Presents #85 |
| Emily Osborn | 1991-09 | J. M. DeMatteis, Sal Buscema | The Spectacular Spider-Man #180 |
| Garrison Kane (Weapon X) | 1991-09 | Fabian Nicieza, Rob Liefeld | X-Force #2 |
| Lodestone | 1991-09 | Danny Fingeroth, Mike Manley | Darkhawk #7 |
| Acolytes | 1991-10 | Chris Claremont, Jim Lee | X-Men (vol. 2) #1 |
| Bloodshed | 1991-10 | Kurt Busiek, Steven Butler | Web of Spider-Man #81 |
| Delgado | 1991-10 | Chris Claremont, Jim Lee | X-Men (vol. 2) #1 |
| Fabian Cortez | 1991-10 | Chris Claremont, Jim Lee | X-Men (vol. 2) #1 |
| Left Hand | 1991-10 | Fabian Nicieza, Mark Bagley | New Warriors #16 |
| Lyja | 1991-10 | Tom DeFalco, Paul Ryan | Fantastic Four #357 (Note: Revealed to have been impersonating Alicia Masters since Fantastic Four #265 (April 1984).) |
| Trevor Fitzroy | 1991-10 | John Byrne, Jim Lee, Whilce Portacio | Uncanny X-Men #281 |
| Upstarts | 1991-10 | John Byrne, Jim Lee, Whilce Portacio | Uncanny X-Men #281 |
| Bishop | 1991-11 | Whilce Portacio, Jim Lee | Uncanny X-Men #282 |
| Bloodstrike | 1991-11 | Fabian Nicieza, Mark Bagley | New Warriors #17 |
| Donald & Deborah Ritter | 1991-11 | Roy Thomas, Dann Thomas, Mark Texeira | Eternals: The Herod Factor |
| Paibok | 1991-11 | Tom DeFalco, Paul Ryan, Danny Bulanadi | Fantastic Four #358 |
| Squirrel Girl | 1991-11 | Will Murray, Steve Ditko | Marvel Super-Heroes (vol. 2) #8 |
| Talon | 1991-11 | Jim Valentino | Guardians of the Galaxy #18 |
| Xavier's Security Enforcers | 1991-11 | Whilce Portacio, John Byrne, Art Thibert | Uncanny X-Men #282 |
| Devos the Devastator | 1991-12 | Tom DeFalco, Paul Ryan, Danny Bulanadi | Fantastic Four #359 |
| Gamesmaster | 1991-12 | John Byrne, Whilce Portacio | Uncanny X-Men #283 |
| Micromax | 1991-12 | Alan Davis | Excalibur #44 |
| Cerise | 1992-01 | Alan Davis | Excalibur #46 |
| Necrom | 1992-01 | Alan Davis | Excalibur #46 |
| Omega Red | 1992-01 | John Byrne, Jim Lee | X-Men (vol. 2) #4 |
| Phantazia | 1992-01 | Fabian Nicieza, Rob Liefeld | X-Force #6 |
| Thornn | 1992-01 | Fabian Nicieza, Rob Liefeld | X-Force #6 |
| Vengeance | 1992-01 | Howard Mackie | Blaze: Spirit of Vengeance #9 |
| Maverick | 1992-02 | John Byrne, Jim Lee | X-Men (vol. 2) #5 |
| Mikhail Rasputin | 1992-02 | Chris Claremont, Dave Cockrum | Uncanny X-Men #285 |
| Nasty Boys | 1992-02 | Peter David | X-Factor #75 |
| Team X | 1992-02 | John Byrne, Jim Lee | X-Men (vol. 2) #5 |
| Carnage | 1992-03 | Mark Bagley, David Michelinie | The Amazing Spider-Man #360 |
| Demogoblin | 1992-03 | Gerry Conway, Sal Buscema | Web of Spider-Man #86 |
| Evelyn Necker | 1992-03 | Dan Abnett, Liam Sharp | Death's Head II #1 |
| Feron | 1992-03 | Alan Davis | Excalibur #48 |
| Folding Circle | 1992-03 | Fabian Nicieza, Mark Bagley | New Warriors #21 |
| Grizzly (Theodore Winchester) | 1992-03 | Fabian Nicieza, Rob Liefeld | X-Force #8 |
| Hybrid (Scott Washington) | 1992-03 | Fabian Nicieza, Mark Bagley, Evan Skolnick, Patrick Zircher | New Warriors #21 |
| Infinity Watch | 1992-03 | Jim Starlin, Angel Medina | Warlock and the Infinity Watch #2 |
| Korath the Pursuer | 1992-03 | Mark Gruenwald, Greg Capullo | Quasar #32 |
| Major Mapleleaf | 1992-03 | Scott Lobdell, Mark Pacella | Alpha Flight #106 |
| Mickey Fondozzi | 1992-03 | Chuck Dixon, John Romita Jr. | Punisher War Zone #1 |
| Shatterax | 1992-03 | Len Kaminski, Paul Ryan | Iron Man #278 |
| Six Pack | 1992-03 | Fabian Nicieza, Rob Liefeld | X-Force #8 |
| Thorn | 1992-03 | Chuck Dixon, John Romita Jr. | Punisher War Zone #1 |
| Occulus | 1992-04 | Tom DeFalco, Paul Ryan | Fantastic Four #363 |
| Rosalie Carbone | 1992-04 | Chuck Dixon, John Romita Jr. | Punisher War Zone #2 |
| Starforce | 1992-04 | Bob Harras | Avengers #346 |
| Bella Donna | 1992-05 | Scott Lobdell, Jim Lee | X-Men (vol. 2) #8 |
| James Lucas | 1992-06 | Marcus McLaurin, Dwayne Turner | Luke Cage #3 |
| Killpower | 1992-06 | Graham Marks, Gary Frank | Motormouth #1 |
| Motormouth | 1992-06 | Graham Marks, Gary Frank | Motormouth #1 |
| Outlaw | 1992-06 | Dan Abnett, Andy Lanning, Douglas Braithwaite | Punisher (vol. 2) #64 |
| Rhapsody | 1992-06 | Peter David, Jim Fern | X-Factor #79 |
| Terror | 1992-06 | D.G. Chichester, Margaret Clark, Klaus Janson | Daredevil #305 (Note: Terror's other identity Shreck first appeared in St. George #2 (Aug. 1988).) |
| Trauma (Troh-Maw) | 1992-06 | Peter David, Gary Frank | Incredible Hulk #394 |
| Warheads | 1992-06 | Paul Neary, Gary Erskine | Warheads #1 |
| Weapon P.R.I.M.E. | 1992-06 | Rob Liefeld, Mark Pacella | X-Force #11 |
| Crule | 1992-07 | Fabian Nicieza, Rob Liefeld, Mark Pacella | X-Force #12 |
| Dark Angel | 1992-07 | Bernie Jaye, Geoff Senior | Hell's Angel #1 |
| Doppleganger | 1992-07 | Jim Starlin, Ron Lim, Al Milgrom | Infinity War #1 |
| Moonhunter | 1992-07 | Mark Gruenwald, Rik Levins | Captain America #402 |
| War Machine | 1992-07 | Len Kaminski, Kev Hopgood | Iron Man #282 |
| Bloodaxe | 1992-08 | Tom DeFalco, Pat Olliffe | Thor #450 |
| Caretaker | 1992-08 | Howard Mackie, Andy Kubert | Ghost Rider (vol. 3) #28 |
| Cyttorak | 1992-08 | | Doctor Strange, Sorcerer Supreme #44 (Note: First mentioned in Strange Tales #124 (Sept. 1964).) |
| Lilith (demon) | 1992-08 | Howard Mackie, Andy Kubert | Ghost Rider (vol. 3) #28 |
| Midnight Sons | 1992-08 | Jim Starlin, Angel Medina | Ghost Rider (vol. 3) #28 |
| Morg | 1992-08 | Ron Marz, Ron Lim | Silver Surfer #69 |
| Nightstalkers | 1992-08 | D. G. Chichester, Ron Garney, Tom Palmer | Ghost Rider (vol. 3) #28 |
| Kestrel | 1992-09 | Larry Hama | Wolverine (vol. 2) #60 |
| Lynn Michaels | 1992-09 | Chuck Dixon, John Romita Jr. | Punisher War Zone #7 |
| Blood Spider | 1992-10 | David Michelinie, Mark Bagley, Jerry Bingham | The Amazing Spider-Man #367 |
| Cardinal | 1992-10 | Fabian Nicieza, Darick Robertson | New Warriors #28 |
| Morph | 1992-10 (animated); 1992-11 (comics); 1995-02 (revamp) | Mark Edward Edens | X-Men season 1 (animated series) X-Men Adventures #1 (comics) (Note: Changeling, an alternate continuity version of Morph, previously appeared in X-Men #35 (Aug. 1967).); X-Men Alpha (revamped look) |
| Skinner | 1992-10 | Howard Mackie, Adam Kubert | Ghost Rider/Blaze: Spirits of Vengeance #3 |
| Turbo | 1992-10 | Evan Skolnick, Dwight Coye, James Brock | New Warriors #28 |
| Alchemax | 1992-11 | Peter David, Rick Leonardi | Spider-Man 2099 #1 |
| Slapstick | 1992-11 | Len Kaminski, James Fry | Awesome Slapstick #1 |
| Sprocket | 1992-11 | Fabian Nicieza, Dave Hoover | Night Thrasher: Four Control" #2 |
| Spider-Man 2099 | 1992-11 | Peter David, Rick Leonardi | Spider-Man 2099 #1 |
| Tyler Stone | 1992-11 | Peter David, Rick Leonardi | Spider-Man 2099 #1 |
| Digitek | 1992-12 | John Tomlinson, Andy Lanning, Dermot Power | Digitek #1 |
| Doom 2099 | 1992-12 | John Francis Moore, Pat Broderick | Marvel Comics Presents #118 |
| Maestro | 1992-12 | Peter David, George Pérez | Incredible Hulk: Future Imperfect #1 |
| Ravage 2099 | 1992-12 | Stan Lee, Paul Ryan | Ravage 2099 #1 |
| Scanner | 1992-12 | Bob Harras, Scott Lobdell, John Romita Jr. | Avengers #357 (Note: Called "Screener" in her first appearance.) |
| Genetix | 1993-01 | Andy Lanning, Graham Marks, Phil Gascoine | Codename: Genetix #1 |
| Legacy Virus | 1993-01 | Fabian Nicieza, Greg Capullo | X-Force #18 |
| Man-Eater | 1993-01 | Gregory Wright, Steven Butler | Silver Sable and the Wild Pack #8 |
| Maxam | 1993-01 | Jim Starlin, Tom Raney | Warlock and the Infinity Watch #12 |
| Copycat | 1993-02 | Fabian Nicieza, Greg Capullo | X-Force #19 (Note: Copycat is revealed to have been impersonating Domino since New Mutants #98 (Feb. 1991).) |
| Orwell Taylor | 1993-02 | David Michelinie, Mark Bagley | Venom: Lethal Protector #1 |
| Punisher 2099 | 1993-02 | Pat Mills, Tony Skinner, Tom Morgan | Punisher 2099 #1 |
| Kwannon | 1993-02 | Fabian Nicieza, Andy Kubert | X-Men (vol. 2) #17 |
| Tuck | 1993-02 | Dan Abnett, Liam Sharp | Death's Head #3 |
| The Jury | 1993-03 | David Michelinie, Mark Bagley | Venom: Lethal Protector #2 |
| New Enforcers | 1993-03 | Terry Kavanagh, Alex Saviuk, Derek Yaniger | Web of Spider-Man #98 |
| Ramshot | 1993-03 | David Michelinie, Mark Bagley | Venom: Lethal Protector #2 |
| Random | 1993-03 | Peter David, Joe Quesada | X-Factor #88 |
| Sentry (Curtis Elkins) | 1993-03 | David Michelinie, Mark Bagley | Venom: Lethal Protector #2 |
| Shock | 1993-03 | D.G. Chichester, Scott McDaniel | Daredevil #314 |
| Unuscione | 1993-03 | Scott Lobdell, Brandon Peterson | Uncanny X-Men #298 |
| Graydon Creed | 1993-04 | Scott Lobdell, Brandon Peterson | Uncanny X-Men #299 |
| Nightwatch | 1993-04 | Terry Kavanagh, Alex Saviuk, Joe Rubinstein | Web of Spider-Man #99 (Note: Alter ego Kevin Trench first appeared in Web of Spider-Man #97 (Feb. 1993).) |
| Roland Treece | 1993-04 | David Michelinie, Mark Bagley | Venom: Lethal Protector #3 |
| Sepulchre | 1993-04 | Mark Gruenwald, Grant Miehm | Quasar #45 |
| Amelia Voght | 1993-05 | Scott Lobdell, John Romita Jr. | Uncanny X-Men #300 |
| Charon | 1993-05 | Peter David, Terry Shoemaker | X-Factor Annual #8 |
| Doctor Nemesis | 1993-05 | Roy Thomas, Dave Hoover | Invaders (vol. 2) #1 |
| Ganymede | 1993-05 | Ron Marz, Ron Lim | Silver Surfer (vol. 3) #80 |
| Hindsight | 1993-05 | Fabian Nicieza, Darick Robertson | New Warriors Annual #3 |
| Lasher | 1993-05 | David Michelinie, Ron Lim | Venom: Lethal Protector #4 |
| Milan | 1993-05 | Scott Lobdell, John Romita Jr. | Uncanny X-Men #300 |
| Neophyte | 1993-05 | Scott Lobdell, John Romita Jr. | Uncanny X-Men #300 |
| Phage | 1993-05 | David Michelinie, Ron Lim | Venom: Lethal Protector #4 |
| Riot | 1993-05 | David Michelinie, Ron Lim | Venom: Lethal Protector #4 (Note: Not named until Carnage, U.S.A. #2 (March 2012).) |
| Scream | 1993-05 | David Michelinie, Ron Lim | Venom: Lethal Protector #4 |
| Senyaka | 1993-05 | Scott Lobdell, John Romita Jr. | Uncanny X-Men #300 |
| Shriek | 1993-05 | Ron Lim, Mark Bagley, Mike W. Barr, Tom DeFalco, Jerry Bingham, Terry Kavanagh | Spider-Man Unlimited #1 |
| Deathcry | 1993-06 | Bob Harras, Steve Epting | Avengers #363 |
| Revanche | 1993-06 | Fabian Nicieza, Andy Kubert | X-Men (vol. 2) #21 (Note: First appeared as Kwannon in X-Men (vol. 2) #17.) |
| Siena Blaze | 1993-06 | Scott Lobdell, Jason Pearson, Tom Grummett | Uncanny X-Men Annual #17 |
| Tyrant | 1993-06 | Ron Marz, Ron Lim, Tom Christopher | Silver Surfer (vol. 3) #81 |
| X-Cutioner | 1993-06 | Scott Lobdell, Jason Pearson | Uncanny X-Men Annual #1993 |
| Exodus | 1993-07 | Scott Lobdell, Joe Quesada | X-Factor #92 |
| Piecemeal | 1993-07 | Peter David, Gary Frank, Cam Smith | Incredible Hulk #407 |
| Weasel | 1993-07 | Fabian Nicieza, Klaus Janson | Cable #3 |
| Die-Cut | 1993-08 | Glenn Dakin, John Royle | Death's Head II & the Origin of Die-Cut #1 |
| Slayback | 1993-08 | Fabian Nicieza, Joe Madureira | Deadpool: The Circle Chase #1 |
| Death Metal | 1993-09 | Dan Abnett, Dell Barras | Death³ #1 |
| Ectokid | 1993-09 | Clive Barker, Steve Skroce | Ectokid #1 |
| Hulk 2099 | 1993-09 | Gerard Jones, Dwayne Turner | 2099 Unlimited #1 |
| Raptor | 1993-09 | Roy Thomas, Kris Renkewitz | Avengers West Coast Annual (vol. 2) #8 |
| Reignfire | 1993-09 | Fabian Nicieza, Matt Broome | X-Force #26 |
| Bloodhawk | 1993-10 | John Francis Moore, Ron Lim | X-Men 2099 #1 |
| Cerebra | 1993-10 | John Francis Moore, Ron Lim | X-Men 2099 #1 |
| Freya | 1993-10 | Bill Mantlo, Don Heck | Thor #321 |
| Genis-Vell | 1993-10 | Ron Marz, Ron Lim | Silver Surfer Annual #6 |
| Krystalin | 1993-10 | John Francis Moore, Ron Lim | X-Men 2099 #1 |
| Locus | 1993-10 | Fabian Nicieza, Matt Broome | X-Force #27 |
| Meanstreak | 1993-10 | John Francis Moore, Ron Lim | X-Men 2099 #1 |
| Metalhead | 1993-10 | John Francis Moore, Ron Lim | X-Men 2099 #1 |
| Skullfire | 1993-10 | John Francis Moore, Ron Lim | X-Men 2099 #1 |
| Xi'an (Desert Ghost) | 1993-10 | John Francis Moore, Ron Lim | X-Men 2099 #1 |
| Haven | 1993-11 | J. M. DeMatteis, Greg Luzniak | X-Factor #96 |
| Philip Fetter | 1993-11 | Clive Barker, Elaine Lee, Max Douglas | Saint Sinner #1 |
| Brimstone Love | 1993-12 | John Francis Moore, Ron Lim | X-Men 2099 #3 |
| Candra | 1993-12 | Howard Mackie, Lee Weeks | Gambit #1 |
| La Lunatica | 1993-12 | John Francis Moore, Ron Lim | X-Men 2099 #3 |
| Megataur | 1993-12 | Roy Thomas, Herb Trimpe | Fantastic Four Unlimited #4 |
| Shard | 1993-12 | Scott Lobdell, John Romita Jr. | Uncanny X-Men Annual #17 |
| Threnody | 1993-12 | Fabian Nicieza, Richard Bennett Lamas | X-Men (vol. 2) #27 |
| System Crash | 1994-03 | D.G. Chichester, Scott McDaniel, Bill Oakley | Daredevil #326 |
| Phalanx | 1994-04 | Chris Claremont, Bill Sienkiewicz, Scott Lobdell, Joe Madureira | Uncanny X-Men #305 |
| Ghost Rider 2099 | 1994-05 | Len Kaminski, Chris Bachalo | Ghost Rider 2099 #1 |
| Americop | 1994-06 | Mark Gruenwald, Dave Hoover | Captain America #428 |
| Grim Hunter | 1994-06 | Howard Mackie, Tom Lyle | Spider-Man #47 |
| Talos the Untamed | 1994-06 | Peter David, Gary Frank | Incredible Hulk #418 |
| Century | 1994-07 | Dan Abnett, Andy Lanning, Tom Tenney | Force Works #1 |
| ClanDestine | 1994-07 | Alan Davis | Marvel Comics Presents #158 |
| Force Works | 1994-07 | Dan Abnett, Andy Lanning, Tom Tenney | Force Works #1 |
| John Carik (Bible John) | 1994-07 | Ian Edginton | Blade #1 |
| Emrys Killebrew | 1994-08 | Mark Waid, Ian Churchill | Deadpool: Sins of the Past #1 |
| Free Spirit | 1994-09 | Mark Gruenwald, Dave Hoover | Captain America #431 |
| Hypnotia | 1994-09 (animated); 1994-11 (comics) | Ron Friedman | Iron Man season 1 (animated series) Marvel Action Hour: Iron Man #1 (comic book) |
| M | 1994-09 | Scott Lobdell, Chris Bachalo | Uncanny X-Men #316 (Note: Merged form of Nicole and Claudette St. Croix. Monet would appear first as Penance) |
| Marrow | 1994-09 | Jeph Loeb, Dave Brewer, Scott Lobdell, Joe Madureira | Cable #15 |
| Synch | 1994-09 | Scott Lobdell, Chris Bachalo | X-Men (vol. 2) #36 |
| Ben Reilly | 1994-10 | Gerry Conway, Tom Lyle | Spider-Man #51 (Note: Ben first appeared as Peter Parker's clone in The Amazing Spider-Man #149 (Oct. 1975).) |
| Blink | 1994-10 | Scott Lobdell, Joe Madureira | Uncanny X-Men #317 |
| Judas Traveller | 1994-10 | Terry Kavanagh, Steven Butler | Web of Spider-Man #117 |
| Skin | 1994-10 | Scott Lobdell, Chris Bachalo | Uncanny X-Men #317 |
| Steppin' Razor | 1994-10 | Ian Edginton, Doug Wheatley | Blade: The Vampire Hunter #4 |
| Chamber | 1994-11 | Scott Lobdell, Chris Bachalo | Generation X #1 |
| Emplate | 1994-11 | Scott Lobdell, Chris Bachalo | Generation X #1 |
| Fantastic Force | 1994-11 | Tom Brevoort | Freedom Force #1 |
| Generation X | 1994-11 | Scott Lobdell, Chris Bachalo | Uncanny X-Men #318 |
| Rakkus | 1994-11 | Bob Harras, Mike Deodato | Avengers #380 |
| Scarlet Spider | 1994-11 | Terry Kavanagh, Steven Butler | Web of Spider-Man #118 |
| Spyne | 1994-11 | Jeph Loeb, Steve Skroce | Cable #17 |
| Jack Flag | 1994-12 | Mark Gruenwald, Dave Hoover | Captain America #434 |
| Kaine Parker | 1994-12 | Terry Kavanagh, Steven Butler | Web of Spider-Man #119 |
| Cordelia Frost | 1995-01 | Scott Lobdell, Chris Bachalo | Generation X #3 |
| Genesis | 1995-01 | Jeph Loeb, Steve Skroce | Cable #19 (Note: Tyler Dayspring first appeared in flashback in X-Force #1 (Aug. 1991).) |
| Mondo | 1995-01 | Scott Lobdell, Chris Bachalo | Generation X #3 |
| Dark Beast | 1995-02 | Scott Lobdell, Roger Cruz | X-Men Alpha |
| Holocaust | 1995-02 | Scott Lobdell, Roger Cruz | X-Men Alpha |
| Pete Wisdom | 1995-02 | Warren Ellis, Ken Lashley | Excalibur #86 |
| Bedlam | 1995-03 | John Francis Moore, Steve Epting | Factor X #1 |
| Flipside | 1995-03 | Peter David, Joe St. Pierre | Spider-Man 2099 #29 |
| X-Man | 1995-03 | Jeph Loeb, Steve Skroce | X-Man #1 |
| Sugar Man | 1995-04 | Scott Lobdell, Chris Bachalo | Generation Next #2 |
| Timeslip | 1995-05 | Evan Skolnick, Patrick Zircher | New Warriors #59 |
| Phil Urich | 1995-06 | Gerry Conway | Web of Spider-Man #125 |
| Fatale | 1995-07; 1993-04 (retcon) | John Francis Moore, Jeff Matsuda | X-Factor #112; Uncanny X-Men #299 (retcon) (Note: Pamela Greenwood, a waitress, was later identified as Fatale in disguise.) |
| Hemingway | 1995-08 | Scott Lobdell, Chris Bachalo | Generation X #5 |
| Helix | 1995-08 | Tom DeFalco, Todd Dezago, Ron Lim | Maximum Clonage Alpha |
| Jason Ionello | 1995-08 | Kurt Busiek, Pat Olliffe | Untold Tales of Spider-Man #1 |
| Mastermind (Martinique Jason) | 1995-09 | Jeph Loeb, Tim Sale | Wolverine/Gambit: Victims #1 |
| Scorcher | 1995-09 | Kurt Busiek, Pat Olliffe | Untold Tales of Spider-Man #1 |
| She-Venom | 1995-09 | Larry Hama, Greg Luzniak | Venom: Sinner Takes All #2 (Note: She-Venom's other identity Anne Weying first appeared in The Amazing Spider-Man #375 (Mar. 1993).) |
| Skrull Kill Krew | 1995-09 | Grant Morrison, Mark Millar, Brendan McCarthy, Steve Yeowell | Skrull Kill Krew #1 |
| Batwing | 1995-10 | Kurt Busiek, Pat Olliffe | Untold Tales of Spider-Man #2 |
| Chris Bradley (Bolt, Maverick) | 1995-10 | Howard Mackie, Tom Grummett, Dan Lawlis | X-Men Unlimited #8 |
| Lady Octopus | 1995-10 | J. M. DeMatteis, Angel Medina | The Amazing Spider-Man #406 |
| Abraham Whistler | 1995-11 (TV); 2002-05 (comics) | David S. Goyer | Spider-Man: The Animated Series (first appearance) Blade II #1 (first comic book) |
| Dirtnap | 1995-11 | | Wolverine (vol. 2) #95 |
| Gregory Herd (Shadrac) | 1995-11 | Todd Dezago, Sal Buscema, Jimmy Palmiotti | Spectacular Scarlet Spider #1 |
| Hyperstorm | 1995-11 | Tom DeFalco, Paul Ryan, Dan Bulanadi | Fantastic Four #406 |
| Captain Marvel (Genis-Vell) | 1995-12 | | Captain Marvel (vol. 3) #1 (Note: Genis-Vell first appeared as Legacy in Silver Surfer Annual #6 (Oct. 1993).) |
| Joseph | 1995-12 | Scott Lobdell, Roger Cruz | Uncanny X-Men #327 |
| Joystick | 1995-12 | Tom DeFalco, Mark Bagley | Amazing Scarlet Spider #2 |
| Chimera | 1996-01 | Larry Hama, Adam Kubert | Wolverine (vol. 2) #97 |
| Madame Sanctity | 1996-01 | Scott Lobdell, Jeph Loeb, Gene Ha | Askani'son #1 |
| Twilight | 1996-01 | Warren Ellis, Dale Eaglesham | 2099 A.D. Genesis #1 |
| Willow | 1996-01 | Warren Ellis, Dale Eaglesham | 2099 A.D. Genesis #1 |
| Bulwark | 1996-02 | Scott Lobdell, Todd Dezago, Tom Grummett | Generation X #12 |
| Murmur | 1996-02 | Scott Lobdell, Todd Dezago, Tom Grummett | Generation X #12 |
| Risque | 1996-02 | Jeph Loeb, Adam Pollina | X-Force #51 |
| Crimson Dawn | 1996-03 | Scott Lobdell, Ben Raab, Joe Madureira, Salvador Larroca | Uncanny X-Men #330 |
| Post | 1996-03 | Scott Lobdell, Andy Kubert | X-Men (vol. 2) #50 |
| X-Nation | 1996-03 | Tom Peyer, Humberto Ramos | X-Nation 2099 #1 |
| Bastion | 1996-05 | Scott Lobdell, Pasqual Ferry | X-Men (vol. 2) #52 |
| Don Fortunato | 1996-05 | Howard Mackie, John Romita Jr. | Spider-Man #70 |
| Jimmy-6 | 1996-05 | Howard Mackie, John Romita Jr. | Spider-Man #70 |
| Ozymandias | 1996-05 | Scott Lobdell, Joe Madureira | Uncanny X-Men #332 |
| Onslaught | 1996-06 | Scott Lobdell, Mark Waid, Andy Kubert | X-Men (vol. 2) #53 |
| Photon (Monica Rambeau) | 1996-06 | Glenn Herdling, M. C. Wyman | Avengers Unplugged #5 (Note: Monica Rambeau first appeared as Captain Marvel in Amazing Spider-Man Annual #16.) |
| MI-13 | 1996-09 | Warren Ellis | Excalibur #101 |
| Alison Mongrain | 1996-11 | Todd Dezago, Luke Ross | The Spectacular Spider-Man #240 |
| Rikki Barnes | 1996-11 | Jeph Loeb, Rob Liefeld | Captain America (vol. 2) #1 |
| Ultragirl | 1996-11 | Barbara Kesel, Leonard Kirk | Ultragirl #1 |
| Atlas | 1997-01 | Peter David, Mike Deodato | Incredible Hulk #449 (Note: First appeared as Power Man in The Avengers #21 (Oct. 1965).) |
| Black Tarantula | 1997-01 | Tom DeFalco, Steve Skroce | The Amazing Spider-Man #419 |
| MACH-1 | 1997-01 | Kurt Busiek, Mark Bagley | Incredible Hulk #449 (Note: First appeared as Beetle in Strange Tales #123 (Aug. 1964).) |
| Songbird | 1997-01 | Kurt Busiek, Mark Bagley | Incredible Hulk #449 (Note: Melissa Gold first appeared as Screaming Mimi in Marvel Two-in-One #54 (Aug. 1979).) |
| T-Ray | 1997-01 | Joe Kelly, Ed McGuiness | Deadpool #1 |
| Thunderbolts | 1997-01 | Kurt Busiek, Mark Bagley | Incredible Hulk #449 |
| Abyss | 1997-02 | Todd Dezago, Scott Clark | Cable (vol. 2) #40 |
| Chtylok (the Che-K'n Kau) | 1997-02 | Todd Dezago, Mike Wieringo | Sensational Spider-Man #13 |
| Kraven the Hunter (Alyosha Kravinoff) | 1997-02 | J. M. DeMatteis, Luke Ross | The Spectacular Spider-Man #243 |
| Dallas Riordan | 1997-04 | Kurt Busiek, Mark Bagley | Thunderbolts #1 |
| Jolt | 1997-04 | Kurt Busiek, Mark Bagley | Thunderbolts #1 |
| Megan McLaren | 1997-04 | Kurt Busiek, Mark Bagley | Thunderbolts #1 |
| Cecilia Reyes | 1997-06 | Scott Lobdell, Carlos Pacheco | X-Men (vol. 2) #65 |
| Crimson Cowl (Justine Hammer) | 1997-06 | Kurt Busiek, Mark Bagley | Thunderbolts #3 |
| Maggott | 1997-06 | Scott Lobdell, Joe Madureira | Uncanny X-Men #345 |
| Flex | 1997-07 | Steven T. Seagle, Anthony Winn | Alpha Flight (vol. 2) #-1 |
| Radius | 1997-07 | Steven T. Seagle, Anthony Winn | Alpha Flight (vol. 2) #-1 |
| Manbot | 1997-08 | Steven T. Seagle, Scott Clark | Alpha Flight (vol. 2) #1 |
| Dark Gods | 1997-10 | Dan Jurgens, John Romita Jr. | Journey into Mystery #513 |
| Irene Merryweather | 1997-11 | James Robinson, José Ladrönn | Cable #48 |
| Archer | 1997-12 | Howard Mackie, Duncan Rouleau | X-Factor #140 |
| Fixx | 1997-12 | Howard Mackie, Duncan Rouleau | X-Factor #140 |
| Greystone | 1997-12 | Howard Mackie, Duncan Rouleau | X-Factor #140 |
| Harbinger of Apocalypse | 1998-01 | James Robinson, José Ladrönn | Cable (vol. 2) #50 |
| A-Next | 1998-02 | Tom DeFalco, Ron Frenz | What If (vol. 2) #105 |
| J2 | 1998-02 | Tom DeFalco, Ron Frenz | What If (vol. 2) #105 |
| Spider-Girl (Mayday Parker) | 1998-02 | Tom DeFalco, Ron Frenz, Mark Bagley | What If (vol. 2) #105 |
| Ajax (Francis Freeman) | 1998-03 | Joe Kelly, Walter A. McDaniel | Deadpool #14 |
| Gaia | 1998-04 | Larry Hama, Andy Smith | Generation X #37 |
| Rumiko Fujikawa | 1998-05 | Kurt Busiek, Sean Chen | Iron Man (vol. 3) #4 |
| Warbird (Carol Danvers) | 1998-05 | | Avengers #4 |
| Synapse | 1998-07 | Scott Lobdell, Tom Morgan | Daredevil #377 |
| Baymax | 1998-09 | Steven T. Seagle, Duncan Rouleau | Sunfire & Big Hero 6 #1 |
| Big Hero 6 | 1998-09 | Steven T. Seagle, Duncan Rouleau | Sunfire & Big Hero 6 #1 |
| Dusk (Cassie St. Commons) | 1998-09 | Joseph Harris, Adam Pollina | Slingers #0 |
| GoGo Tomago | 1998-09 | Steven T. Seagle, Duncan Rouleau | Sunfire & Big Hero 6 #1 |
| Hiro Takachiho | 1998-09 | Steven T. Seagle, Duncan Rouleau | Sunfire & Big Hero 6 #1 |
| Honey Lemon | 1998-09 | Steven T. Seagle, Duncan Rouleau | Sunfire & Big Hero 6 #1 |
| Prodigy (Ritchie Gilmore) | 1998-09 | Joseph Harris, Adam Pollina | Slingers #0 |
| Ravage | 1998-09 | Glenn Greenberg | Rampaging Hulk (vol. 2) #2 |
| Ricochet | 1998-09 | Joseph Harris, Adam Pollina | Slingers #0 |
| Silverclaw | 1998-09 | Kurt Busiek, George Pérez | Avengers (vol. 3) #8 |
| Slingers | 1998-09 | Joseph Harris, Adam Pollina, ChrisCross | Slingers #0 |
| Triathlon | 1998-09 | Kurt Busiek, George Pérez | Avengers (vol. 3) #8 |
| Charcoal | 1998-10 | Kurt Busiek, Mark Bagley | Thunderbolts #19 |
| Winter Guard | 1998-10 | Kurt Busiek, Sean Chen | Iron Man (vol. 3) #9 |
| Dora Milaje | 1998-11 | Christopher Priest, Mark Texeira | Black Panther (vol. 3) #1 |
| Earth Sentry | 1998-11 | Tom DeFalco, Ron Frenz | A-Next #2 |
| Nakia | 1998-11 | Christopher Priest, Mark Texeira | Black Panther (vol. 3) #1 |
| Okoye | 1998-11 | Christopher Priest, Mark Texeira | Black Panther (vol. 3) #1 |
| Olivier | 1998-11 | Bernie Wrightson, Christopher Golden, Thomas E. Sniegoski | Punisher (vol. 4) #1 (Note: Olivier's human form Frank Costa first appeared in Marvel Super Action #1 (Jan. 1976).) |
| Mattie Franklin | 1998-11 | John Byrne, Rafael Kayanan | The Amazing Spider-Man #441 |
| Zuri | 1998-11 | Christopher Priest, Mark Texeira | Black Panther (vol. 3) #1 |
| Nahrees | 1998-12 | Paul Jenkins, Jae Lee | Inhumans (vol. 2) #2 |
| Achebe | 1999-01 | Christopher Priest, Mark Texeira | Black Panther (vol. 3) #3 |
| American Dream | 1999-01 | Tom DeFalco, Ron Frenz | A-Next #4 |
| Coal Tiger | 1999-01 | Tom DeFalco, Ron Frenz | A-Next #4 |
| Freebooter | 1999-01 | Tom DeFalco, Ron Frenz | A-Next #4 |
| Stewart Ward | 1999-01 | Howard Mackie, John Romita Jr. | Peter Parker: Spider-Man (vol. 2) #1 |
| Adrienne Frost | 1999-02 | Jay Faerber, Terry Dodson | Generation X #48 |
| Fever Pitch | 1999-02 | Jay Faerber, Terry Dodson | Generation X #50 |
| White Wolf | 1999-02 | Christopher Priest, Mark Texeira | Black Panther (vol. 3) #4 |
| Wild Thing | 1999-02 | Tom DeFalco, Ron Lim | J2 #5 |
| Valeria Richards | 1999-03 | Chris Claremont, Salvador Larroca | Fantastic Four (vol. 3) #15 |
| Hope Pym | 1999-04 | Tom DeFalco, Ron Frenz | A-Next #7 |
| Sabreclaw | 1999-05 | Tom DeFalco, Ron Lim | J2 #8 |
| Blacklight | 1999-06 | Tom DeFalco, Ron Frenz | A-Next #9 |
| Red Shift | 1999-07 | Louise Simonson, Jon J Muth | Galactus: The Devourer #1 |
| Cobweb | 1999-08 | Alan Moore, Melinda Gebbie | Tomorrow Stories #1 |
| Connie Ferrari | 1999-08 | Mark Waid, Andy Kubert | Captain America (vol. 3) #20 |
| Buzz (Jack Jameson) | 1999-09 | Tom DeFalco, Ron Frenz | Spider-Girl Annual #1999 |
| Exemplars | 1999-11 | Howard Mackie | Peter Parker: Spider-Man #11 |
| Diamanda Nero | 1999-12 | John Francis Moore, Pascal Alixe | X-Men: Phoenix #1 |
| Echo | 1999-12 | David Mack, Joe Quesada | Daredevil (vol. 2) #9 |
| Otomo | 1999-12 | Karl Bollers, Mike Higgins, Joe Bennett | X-51 #5 |
| Revengers | 1999-12 | Tom DeFalco, Ron Frenz | A-Next #12 |
| John Ryker | 2000-03 | Paul Jenkins, Ron Garney, Mike McKone | Incredible Hulk (vol. 3) #12 |
| Devil Hulk | 2000-04 | Paul Jenkins, Ron Garney, Sal Buscema | Incredible Hulk (vol. 3) #13 |
| Squid | 2000-04 | Howard Mackie, John Romita Jr. | Peter Parker: Spider-Man (vol. 2) #16 |
| Martin Soap | 2000-05 | Garth Ennis, Steve Dillon | Punisher (vol. 5) #2 |
| Randall Shire | 2000-05 | Robert Weinberg, Michael Ryan | Cable #79 |
| Karima Shapandar | 2000-06 | Chris Claremont, Brett Booth | X-Men Unlimited #27 |
| Ma Gnucci | 2000-07 | Garth Ennis, Steve Dillon | Punisher (vol. 5) #4 |
| Flux | 2000-08 | Paul Jenkins, Ron Garney | Incredible Hulk (vol. 3) #17 |
| Nocturne (Talia Wagner) | 2000-08 | Jim Calafiore | X-Men: Millennial Visions |
| Noh-Varr (Captain Marvel, Protector) | 2000-08 | Grant Morrison, J. G. Jones | Marvel Boy #1 |
| Sentry | 2000-09 | Paul Jenkins, Jae Lee, Rick Veitch | Sentry #1 |
| Kenny McFarlane | 2000-10 | Brian Michael Bendis, Mark Bagley | Ultimate Spider-Man #1 |
| Spider-Man (Ultimate) | 2000-10 | Brian Michael Bendis, Mark Bagley | Ultimate Spider-Man #1 (Note: The Ultimate character is an alternate version of the Spider-Man that first appeared in Amazing Fantasy #15 (Aug. 1962).) |
| Russian | 2000-11 | Garth Ennis, Steve Dillon | Punisher (vol. 5) #8 |
| Typeface | 2000-11 | Paul Jenkins, Mark Buckingham | Peter Parker: Spider-Man (vol. 2) #23 |
| Spyke | 2000-12 | Robert N. Skir, Steven E. Gordon | X-Men: Evolution season 1 ep. 5 ("Speed and Spyke") |
| Mister X | 2001-02 | Frank Tieri, Sean Chen | Wolverine (vol. 2) #159 |
| Smuggler | 2001-02 | Fabian Nicieza | Thunderbolts #47 (Note: Smuggler's brother Erik Josten once went by the name of Smuggler in Peter Parker, the Spectacular Spider-Man #49 (Dec. 1980).) |
| Wolverine (Ultimate) | 2001-02 | Mark Millar, Adam Kubert | Ultimate X-Men #1 (Note: The Ultimate character is an alternate version of the Wolverine that first appeared in The Incredible Hulk #180 (Oct. 1974).) |
| Desak | 2001-03 | Dan Jurgens, Tom Grummett | Thor Annual (vol. 2) #2001 |
| Malcolm Colcord | 2001-03 | Frank Tieri, Sean Chen | Wolverine (vol. 2) #160 |
| Meteorite | 2001-03 | Fabian Nicieza, Mark Bagley | Thunderbolts #48 |
| Omertà | 2001-03 | Scott Lobdell, Salvador Larroca | Uncanny X-Men #392 |
| Sunpyre | 2001-03 | Scott Lobdell, Salvador Larroca | Uncanny X-Men #392 |
| Thor Girl | 2001-03 | Dan Jurgens, John Romita Jr. | Thor (vol. 2) #22 |
| Hulk (Ultimate) | 2001-05 | Brian Michael Bendis, Phil Hester, Mark Millar, Bryan Hitch | Ultimate Marvel Team-Up #2 (Note: The Ultimate character is an alternate version of the Hulk that first appeared in The Incredible Hulk #1 (May 1962).) |
| Brent Jackson | 2001-06 | Frank Tieri, Mark Texeira | Wolverine (vol. 2) #163 |
| Ezekiel Sims | 2001-06 | J. Michael Straczynski, John Romita Jr. | The Amazing Spider-Man (vol. 2) #30 |
| Morlun | 2001-06 | J. Michael Straczynski, John Romita Jr. | The Amazing Spider-Man (vol. 2) #30 |
| Cassandra Nova | 2001-07 | Grant Morrison, Frank Quitely | New X-Men #114 |
| Doop | 2001-07 | Peter Milligan, Mike Allred | X-Force #116 |
| Iron Man (Ultimate) | 2001-07 | Brian Michael Bendis, Mike Allred | Ultimate Marvel Team-Up #4 (Note: The Ultimate character is an alternate version of the Iron Man that first appeared in Tales of Suspense #39 (March 1963).) |
| Vargas | 2001-07 | Chris Claremont, Salvador Larroca | X-Treme X-Men #1 |
| X-Statix | 2001-07 | Peter Milligan, Mike Allred | X-Force #116 |
| Exiles | 2001-08 | Judd Winick, Mike McKone | Exiles #1 |
| Nick Fury (Ultimate) | 2001-08 | Brian Michael Bendis, Mike Allred | Ultimate Marvel Team-Up #5 (Note: The Ultimate character is an alternate version of the Nick Fury that first appeared in Sgt. Fury and his Howling Commandos #1 (May 1963).) |
| Timebreakers | 2001-08 | Judd Winick, Mike McKone | Exiles #1 |
| Timebroker | 2001-08 | Judd Winick, Mike McKone | Exiles #1 |
| Sublime | 2001-09 | Grant Morrison, Leinil Francis Yu | New X-Men Annual #2001 |
| Xorn | 2001-09 | Grant Morrison, Frank Quitely | New X-Men Annual #2001 |
| Barnell Bohusk (Beak, Blackwing) | 2001-10 | Grant Morrison, Ethan Van Sciver | New X-Men #117 |
| Glob Herman | 2001-10 | Grant Morrison, Ethan Van Sciver | New X-Men #117 |
| Angel Salvadore (Tempest) | 2001-11 | Grant Morrison, Ethan Van Sciver | New X-Men #118 |
| Jessica Jones | 2001-11 | Brian Michael Bendis, Michael Gaydos | Alias #1 |
| No-Girl | 2001-11 | Grant Morrison, Ethan Van Sciver | New X-Men #118 |
| Red Lotus | 2001-11 | Chris Claremont, Salvador Larroca | X-Treme X-Men #5 |
| Stacy X | 2001-11 | Joe Casey, Tom Raney | Uncanny X-Men #399 |
| Stepford Cuckoos | 2001-11 | Grant Morrison, Ethan Van Sciver | New X-Men #118 |
| Tempest | 2001-11 | Grant Morrison, Ethan Van Sciver | New X-Men #118 |
| Elsa Bloodstone | 2001-12 | Dan Abnett, Andy Lanning, Michael Lopez | Bloodstone #1 |
| Lady Mastermind | 2001-12 | Chris Claremont, Salvador Larroca | X-Treme X-Men #6 |
| Samuel Silke | 2001-12 | Brian Michael Bendis, Alex Maleev | Daredevil (vol. 2) #26 |
| Spike | 2001-12 | Peter Milligan, Mike Allred | X-Force #121 |
| Lifeguard | 2002-01 | Chris Claremont, Salvador Larroca | X-Treme X-Men #7 (Note: Heather Cameron appeared in a previous issue, X-Treme X-Men #6 (Dec. 2001), but did not display her Lifeguard identity.) |
| Captain America (Ultimate) | 2002-03 | Mark Millar, Bryan Hitch | Ultimates #1 (Note: The Ultimate character is an alternate version of the Captain America that first appeared in Captain America Comics #1 (March 1941).) |
| Dead Girl (Moonbeam) | 2002-04 | Peter Milligan, Mike Allred | X-Force #125 |
| Malcolm Powder | 2002-04 | Brian Michael Bendis, Michael Gaydos | Alias #6 |
| Sandi Brandenberg | 2002-04 | Ken Siu-Chong, Alvin Lee | Taskmaster #1 |
| Slipstream | 2002-04 | Chris Claremont, Salvador Larroca | X-Treme X-Men #10 (Note: Davis Cameron first appeared as a civilian in X-Treme X-Men #6 (Dec. 2001).) |
| Thor (Ultimate) | 2002-04 | Mark Millar, Bryan Hitch | Ultimates #2 (Note: The Ultimate character is an alternate version of the Thor that first appeared in Journey into Mystery #83 (Aug. 1962).) |
| Triskelion | 2002-04 | Mark Millar, Bryan Hitch | Ultimates #2 |
| Black Swan | 2002-05 | Gail Simone, Udon Studios | Deadpool #65 |
| F.R.I.D.A.Y. | 2002-06 | Mike Grell, Michael Ryan | Iron Man (vol. 3) #53 |
| Kat Farrell | 2002-06 | Bill Rosemann | Deadline #1 |
| Temugin | 2002-06 | Ryan Odagawa, Mike Grell | Iron Man (vol. 3) #53 |
| The Hood | 2002-07 | Brian K. Vaughan, Kyle Hotz, Eric Powell | Hood #1 |
| Phaser (Radian) | 2002-07 | Grant Morrison, Frank Quitely | New X-Men #126 (Note: First appeared as Radian.) |
| Redneck | 2002-07 | Grant Morrison, Frank Quitely | New X-Men #126 |
| Tattoo (Longstrike) | 2002-07 | Grant Morrison, Frank Quitely | New X-Men #126 |
| District X (Mutant Town) | 2002-08 | Grant Morrison, John Paul Leon | New X-Men #127 |
| Fantomex | 2002-08 | Grant Morrison, Igor Kordey | New X-Men #128 |
| Huntsman (Weapon XII) | 2002-08 | Grant Morrison, Igor Kordey | New X-Men #128 |
| Washout | 2002-08 | Peter Milligan, Duncan Fegredo | X-Force #129 |
| Weapon Plus | 2002-08 | Grant Morrison, Igor Kordey | New X-Men #128 |
| X-Corporation | 2002-08 | Grant Morrison | New X-Men #128 |
| Agent X | 2002-09 | Gail Simone, Alvin Lee | Agent X #1 (Note: Agent X first appeared as Nijo in Deadpool #65 (May 2002).) |
| Shola Inkosi | 2002-09 | Chris Claremont, Juan Bobillo | Mekanix #1 |
| Agent Zero | 2002-10 | Frank Tieri, John Byrne, Killien Plunkett | Weapon X: The Draft - Agent Zero #1 (Note: First appeared as Maverick in X-Men (vol. 2) #5 (Feb. 1992).) |
| Annie Ghazikhanian | 2002-10 | Chuck Austen, Ron Garney | Uncanny X-Men #411 |
| Carter Ghazikhanian | 2002-10 | Chuck Austen, Ron Garney | Uncanny X-Men #411 |
| Squidboy | 2002-10 | Chuck Austen, Ron Garney | Uncanny X-Men #410 |
| Wolf Cub | 2002-10 | Brian K. Vaughan, Lee Ferguson | Chamber #1 |
| Chitauri | 2002-11 | Bryan Hitch, Mark Millar | Ultimates #8 |
| Dust | 2002-12 | Grant Morrison, Ethan Van Sciver | New X-Men #133 |
| Isaiah Bradley | 2003-01 | Robert Morales, Kyle Baker | Truth: Red, White & Black #1 |
| Quentin Quire | 2003-01 | Grant Morrison, Frank Quitely | New X-Men #134 (Note: Possible cameos appeared earlier, in New X-Men #122 (Mar. 2002) and New X-Men #126 (July 2002).) |
| Jeffrey Garrett | 2003-03 | Chris Claremont, Salvador Larroca | X-Treme X-Men #20 |
| Maximus Lobo | 2003-03 | Chuck Austen, Kia Asamiya | Uncanny X-Men #417 |
| Milla Donovan | 2003-03 | Brian Michael Bendis, Alex Maleev | Daredevil (vol. 2) #41 |
| Elias Bogan | 2003-04 | Chris Claremont, Salvador Larroca | X-Treme X-Men #21 (Note: A cameo illustration of Bogan appeared previously in X-Treme X-Men #1 (July 2001).) |
| Ernst | 2003-04 | Grant Morrison, Frank Quitely | New X-Men #135 |
| Evangeline Whedon | 2003-05 | Chris Claremont, Salvador Larroca | X-Treme X-Men #21 |
| Benjamin Richard Parker | 2003-06 | Tom DeFalco, Ron Frenz | Spider-Girl #59 |
| Juston Seyfert | 2003-06 | Sean McKeever, Udon Studios, Eric Vedder, Joe Vriens, Scott Hepburn | Sentinel #1 |
| Mania | 2003-06 | Daniel Way, Francisco Herrera | Venom #1 |
| Alex Wilder | 2003-07 | Brian K. Vaughan, Adrian Alphona | Runaways #1 |
| Alisa Campbell | 2003-07 | Brian Michael Bendis, Michael Gaylos | Alias #22 |
| Chase Stein | 2003-07 | Brian K. Vaughan, Adrian Alphona | Runaways #1 |
| Geldoff | 2003-07 | Brian Michael Bendis, Mark Bagley | Ultimate Spider-Man #40 |
| Gertrude Yorkes | 2003-07 | Brian K. Vaughan, Adrian Alphona | Runaways #1 |
| Josiah X | 2003-07 | Christopher Priest, Joe Bennett | Crew #1 |
| Karolina Dean | 2003-07 | Brian K. Vaughan, Adrian Alphona | Runaways #1 |
| Molly Hayes | 2003-07 | Brian K. Vaughan, Adrian Alphona | Runaways #1 |
| Nico Minoru | 2003-07 | Brian K. Vaughan, Adrian Alphona | Runaways #1 |
| Pride | 2003-07 | Brian K. Vaughan, Adrian Alphona | Runaways #1 |
| Runaways | 2003-07 | Brian K. Vaughan, Adrian Alphona | Runaways #1 |
| Wind Dancer | 2003-07 | Nunzio DeFilippis, Christina Weir, Keron Grant | New Mutants (vol. 2) #1 |
| Anole | 2003-08 | Nunzio DeFilippis, Christina Weir, Keron Grant | New Mutants (vol. 2) #2 |
| Hellion | 2003-08 | Nunzio DeFilippis, Christina Weir, Keron Grant | New Mutants (vol. 2) #2 |
| Jolen | 2003-08 | Sean McKeever, Matt Clark | Inhumans (vol. 4) #2 |
| Mercury | 2003-08 | Nunzio DeFilippis, Christina Weir, Keron Grant | New Mutants (vol. 2) #2 |
| Old Lace | 2003-08 | Brian K. Vaughan, Adrian Alphona | Runaways #2 |
| Ultimaton (Weapon XV) | 2003-08 | Grant Morrison, Chris Bachalo | New X-Men #143 |
| Wallflower | 2003-08 | Nunzio DeFilippis, Christina Weir, Keron Grant | New Mutants (vol. 2) #2 |
| X-23 | 2003-08 (TV); 2004-02 (comics) | Craig Kyle, Christopher Yost | X-Men: Evolution season 3 (animated series); NYX #3 (comics) |
| Rockslide | 2003-09 | Nunzio DeFilippis, Christina Weir | New Mutants (vol. 2) #3 |
| Sonny Burch | 2003-09 | John Jackson Miller, Jorge Lucas | Iron Man (vol. 3) #73 |
| Wither | 2003-09 | Nunzio DeFilippis, Christina Weir, Keron Grant | New Mutants (vol. 2) #3 |
| Azazel | 2003-10 | Chuck Austen, Sean Phillips | Uncanny X-Men #428 |
| Kiwi Black | 2003-10 | Chuck Austen, Philip Tan | Uncanny X-Men #429 |
| Prodigy (David Alleyne) | 2003-10 | Nunzio DeFilippis, Christina Weir, Keron Grant | New Mutants (vol. 2) #4 |
| Elixir | 2003-11 | Nunzio DeFilippis, Christina Weir, Keron Grant | New Mutants (vol. 2) #5 |
| Shepard | 2003-11 | Brian K. Vaughan, Jorge Lucas | Mystique #6 |
| White Tiger (Angela del Toro) | 2003-11 | Brian Michael Bendis, Alex Maleev | Daredevil (vol. 2) #58 |
| Phyla-Vell | 2003-12 | Peter David, Paul Azaceta | Captain Marvel (vol. 4) #16 |
| Match | 2004-01 | Nunzio DeFilippis, Christina Weir | New Mutants (vol. 2) #7 |
| Surge | 2004-01 | Nunzio DeFilippis, Christina Weir, Keron Grant | New Mutants (vol. 2) #8 |
| Christine Everhart | 2004-02 | John Jackson Miller, Jorge Lucas | Iron Man (vol. 3) #75 |
| Maker | 2004-02 | Brian Michael Bendis, Mark Millar, Adam Kubert | Ultimate Fantastic Four #1 (Note: First identifies as Maker in Ultimate Fallout #4 (Aug. 2011).) |
| Lionheart | 2004-03 | Chuck Austen, Olivier Coipel | Avengers (vol. 3) #77 |
| Lucia von Bardas | 2004-04 | Brian Michael Bendis, Gabriele Dell'Otto | Secret War #1 |
| Lorelei Travis | 2004-05 | David Hine, David Yardin | District X #1 |
| One-Above-All | 2004-05 | Mark Waid, Mike Wieringo | Fantastic Four #511 |
| Yukon Jack | 2004-05 | Scott Lobdell, Clayton Henry | Alpha Flight (vol. 3) #1 |
| Loa | 2004-06 | Michael Ryan | New Mutants (vol. 2) #11 |
| Native | 2004-06 | Greg Rucka, Darick Robertson | Wolverine (vol. 3) #13 |
| Daisy Johnson (Quake) | 2004-07 | Brian Michael Bendis, Gabriele Dell'Otto | Secret War #2 |
| Dryad | 2004-07 | Nunzio DeFilippis, Christina Weir | New X-Men (vol. 2) #1 |
| Freakshow | 2004-07 | Chris Claremont, Aaron Lopresti | Excalibur (vol. 3) #1 |
| Hub | 2004-07 | Chris Claremont, Aaron Lopresti | Excalibur (vol. 3) #1 |
| Kavita Rao | 2004-07 | Joss Whedon, John Cassaday | Astonishing X-Men (vol. 3) #1 |
| Ord | 2004-07 | Joss Whedon, John Cassaday | Astonishing X-Men (vol. 3) #1 |
| Quill | 2004-07 | Nunzio DeFilippis, Christina Weir | New X-Men (vol. 2) #1 |
| Southpaw | 2004-07 | Dan Slott, Paul Pelletier | She-Hulk #5 |
| Tildie Soames | 2004-07 | Joss Whedon, John Cassaday | Astonishing X-Men (vol. 3) #1 |
| Wicked | 2004-07 | Chris Claremont, Aaron Lopresti | Excalibur (vol. 3) #1 |
| Anya Corazon (Araña / Spider-Girl) | 2004-08 | Fiona Avery, Mark Brooks | Amazing Fantasy (vol. 2) #1 |
| Gabriel Stacy and Sarah Stacy | 2004-08 | Mike Deodato, J. Michael Straczynski | The Amazing Spider-Man #509 |
| Mister M | 2004-08 | David Hine, David Yardin | District X #2 |
| Valeria Toomes | 2004-08 | Robert Rodi, John Higgins | Identity Disc #1 |
| Abigail Brand | 2004-09 | Joss Whedon, John Cassaday | Astonishing X-Men (vol. 3) #3 |
| Toxin | 2004-09 | Peter Milligan, Clayton Crain | Venom/Carnage #1 |
| Armor | 2004-10 | Joss Whedon, John Cassaday | Astonishing X-Men (vol. 3) #4 |
| Skornn | 2004-10 | Fabian Nicieza, Rob Liefeld | X-Force (vol. 2) #1 |
| Kagenobu Yoshioka | 2004-11 | Akira Yoshida | Elektra: The Hand #1 |
| Mammomax | 2004-11 | Chuck Austen, Salvador Larroca | X-Men (vol. 2) #161 |
| Pixie | 2004-11 | Nunzio DeFilippis, Christina Weir, Michael Ryan | New X-Men (vol. 2) #5 |
| Alexander Bont | 2004-12 | Brian Michael Bendis, Alex Maleev | Daredevil (vol. 2) #66 |
| Gorgon (Tomi Shishido) | 2004-12 | Mark Millar, John Romita Jr. | Wolverine (vol. 3) #20 |
| S.W.O.R.D. | 2004-12 | Joss Whedon, John Cassaday | Astonishing X-Men (vol. 3) #6 |
| Aleksander Lukin | 2005-01 | Ed Brubaker, Steve Epting | Captain America (vol. 5) #1 |
| Amadeus Cho | 2005-01 | Greg Pak, Takeshi Miyazawa | Amazing Fantasy (vol. 2) #15 |
| Blindfold | 2005-01 | Joss Whedon, John Cassaday | Astonishing X-Men (vol. 3) #7 (Note: Blindfold was first mentioned in Astonishing X-Men (vol. 3) #4 (Oct. 2004).) |
| Ebon Samurai | 2005-01 | Scott Lobdell, Clayton Henry | Alpha Flight (vol. 3) #9 |
| Indra | 2005-01 | Nunzio DeFilippis, Christina Weir, Michael Ryan | New X-Men (vol. 2) #7 |
| Maya Hansen | 2005-01 | Warren Ellis, Adi Granov | Iron Man (vol. 4) #1 |
| New Avengers | 2005-01 | Brian Michael Bendis, David Finch | New Avengers #1 |
| Titannus | 2005-01 | Robert Kirkman, Scott Kollins | Marvel Team-Up (vol. 3) #2 |
| Winter Soldier | 2005-01 | Ed Brubaker, Steve Epting | Captain America (vol. 5) #1 |
| Danger | 2005-02 | Joss Whedon, John Cassaday | Astonishing X-Men (vol. 3) #8 |
| Blindspot | 2005-03 | Tony Bedard, Karl Moline | Rogue (vol. 3) #7 |
| Mahr Vehl | 2005-03 | Warren Ellis, Steve McNiven | Ultimate Secret #1 |
| Maria Hill | 2005-03 | Brian Michael Bendis, David Finch | New Avengers #4 |
| Stardust | 2005-03 | Michael Oeming, Andrea Di Vito | Stormbreaker: The Saga of Beta Ray Bill #1 |
| X-Factor Investigations | 2005-03 | Peter David, Pablo Raimondi | Madrox #5 |
| Zander Rice | 2005-03 | Craig Kyle, Christopher Yost, Billy Tan | X-23 #1 |
| Victor Mancha | 2005-04 | Brian K. Vaughan, Adrian Alphona | Runaways (vol. 2) #1 |
| Hawkeye (Kate Bishop) | 2005-04 | Allan Heinberg, Jim Cheung | Young Avengers #1 |
| Hulkling | 2005-04 | Allan Heinberg, Jim Cheung | Young Avengers #1 |
| Iron Lad | 2005-04 | Allan Heinberg, Jim Cheung | Young Avengers #1 |
| Patriot (Eli Bradley) | 2005-04 | Allan Heinberg, Jim Cheung | Young Avengers #1 |
| Wiccan | 2005-04 | Allan Heinberg, Jim Cheung | Young Avengers #1 |
| Young Avengers | 2005-04 | Allan Heinberg, Jim Cheung | Young Avengers #1 |
| Photon (Genis-Vell) | 2005-05 | | New Thunderbolts #6 (Note: Genis-Vell first appeared as Legacy in Silver Surfer Annual #6 (Oct. 1993).) |
| Shuri | 2005-05 | Reginald Hudlin, John Romita Jr. | Black Panther (vol. 4) #2 |
| Ethan Edwards | 2005-06 | Reginald Hudlin, Billy Tan | Marvel Knights Spider-Man #13 |
| Gazer | 2005-06 | Peter Milligan, Salvador Larroca | X-Men (vol. 2) #169 |
| Grasshopper | 2005-06 | Dan Slott, Paul Pelletier | G.L.A. #1 |
| Leather Boy | 2005-06 | Dan Slott, Paul Pelletier | G.L.A. #1 |
| Monica Rappaccini | 2005-06 | Fred Van Lente, Leonard Kirk | Amazing Fantasy (vol. 2) #7 |
| Network | 2005-06 | Nunzio DeFilippis, Christina Weir, Michael Ryan | New X-Men (vol. 2) #12 |
| Trance | 2005-06 | Nunzio DeFilippis, Christina Weir | New X-Men: Academy X #12 |
| Holden Radcliffe | 2005-07 | Marc Sumerak, Mike Hawthorne | Machine Teen #1 |
| Illuminati | 2005-07 | Brian Michael Bendis, Steve McNiven | New Avengers #7 |
| Kimura | 2005-07 | Craig Kyle, Paco Medina | X-23 #6 |
| Kingmaker | 2005-07 | Nunzio DeFilippis, Christina Weir, Clayton Henry | New X-Men: Hellions #1 |
| Machine Teen | 2005-07 | Marc Sumerak, Mike Hawthorne | Machine Teen #1 |
| Bling! | 2005-08 | Peter Milligan, Salvador Larroca | X-Men (vol. 2) #171 |
| Gravity | 2005-08 | Sean McKeever, Mike Norton | Gravity #1 |
| Layla Miller (Butterfly) | 2005-08 | Brian Michael Bendis, Olivier Coipel | House of M #4 |
| Microbe | 2005-08 | Zeb Wells, Skottie Young | New Warriors (vol. 3) #1 |
| Onyxx | 2005-08 | Peter Milligan, Salvador Larroca | X-Men (vol. 2) #171 |
| Pulse (Augustus) | 2005-09 | Peter Milligan, Salvador Larroca | X-Men (vol. 2) #173 |
| Tippy-Toe | 2005-09 | Dan Slott | G.L.A. #4 |
| Vampire by Night | 2005-09 | Jeff Parker, Federica Manfredi | Amazing Fantasy (vol. 2) #10 |
| Tracer | 2005-10 | Peter David, Mike Wieringo | Friendly Neighborhood Spider-Man #1 |
| Xavin | 2005-10 | Brian K. Vaughan, Takeshi Miyazawa | Runaways (vol. 2) #7 |
| Cammi | 2005-11 | Keith Giffen, Mitch Breitweiser | Drax the Destroyer #1 |
| Debrii | 2005-11 | Zeb Wells, Skottie Young | New Warriors (vol. 3) #4 |
| Ronin | 2005-11 | Brian Michael Bendis, Joe Quesada | New Avengers #11 |
| Johnny Dee | 2005-12 | David Hine, Roy Allan Martinez | Son of M #1 |
| Warwolf | 2005-12 | Keith Giffen, Eduardo Francisco | Nick Fury's Howling Commandos #1 |
| Captain | 2006-01 | Warren Ellis, Stuart Immonen | Nextwave #1 |
| Dirk Anger | 2006-01 | Warren Ellis, Stuart Immonen | Nextwave #1 |
| Gauntlet | 2006-01 | Dan Slott, Stefano Caselli, Eric Powell | She-Hulk #100 |
| Leper Queen | 2006-01 | Peter Milligan, Salvador Larroca | House of M: The Day After #1 |
| Miss Arrow | 2006-01 | Peter David, Mike Wieringo, Todd Nauck | Friendly Neighborhood Spider-Man #4 |
| Petra Laskov | 2006-01 | Mark Millar, Brian Hitch | Ultimates 2 #9 |
| Vulcan | 2006-01 | Ed Brubaker, Trevor Hairsine | X-Men: Deadly Genesis #1 |
| Amatsu-Mikaboshi | 2006-02 | Michael Oeming, Scott Kolins | Thor: Blood Oath #6 |
| Darwin | 2006-02 | Ed Brubaker, Pete Woods | X-Men: Deadly Genesis #2 |
| Speed | 2006-02 | Allan Heinberg, Jim Cheung | Young Avengers #10 |
| Danielle Cage | 2006-03 | Brian Michael Bendis, Michael Gaydos | Pulse #13 |
| Iron Spider | 2006-03 | Joe Quesada, Chris Bachalo | The Amazing Spider-Man #529 |
| Matthew Risman | 2006-03 | Craig Kyle, Christopher Yost, Mark Brooks | New X-Men (vol. 2) #22 |
| Caiera | 2006-04 | Greg Pak, Carlo Pagulayan | Incredible Hulk (vol. 3) #92 |
| Chewie | 2006-04 | Kelly Sue DeConnick, David López | Captain Marvel (vol. 8) #2 |
| Clan Akkaba | 2006-04 | Frank Tieri, Clayton Henry | X-Men: Apocalypse vs. Dracula #1 |
| Elloe Kaifi | 2006-04 | Greg Pak, Carlo Pagulayan | Incredible Hulk (vol. 3) #92 |
| Gentle | 2006-04 | Craig Kyle, Christopher Yost, Mark Brooks | New X-Men (vol. 2) #23 |
| Hiroim | 2006-04 | Greg Pak, Carlo Pagulayan | Incredible Hulk (vol. 3) #92 |
| Michael Pointer (Omega) | 2006-04 | Brian Michael Bendis, Steve McNiven | New Avengers #16 |
| Miek | 2006-04 | Greg Pak, Carlo Pagulayan | Incredible Hulk (vol. 3) #92 |
| No-Name | 2006-04 | Greg Pak, Carlo Pagulayan | Incredible Hulk (vol. 3) #92 |
| Red King | 2006-04 | Greg Pak, Carlo Pagulayan | Incredible Hulk (vol. 3) #92 |
| Barracuda | 2006-05 | Garth Ennis, Goran Parlov, Howard Chaykin | Punisher (vol. 7) #31 |
| Freedom Ring | 2006-07 | Robert Kirkman, Andy Kuhn | Marvel Team-Up (vol. 3) #20 |
| Miriam Sharpe | 2006-07 | Mark Millar, Steve McNiven | Civil War #1 |
| Profile | 2006-07 | Charlie Huston, David Finch | Moon Knight (vol. 3) #2 |
| Ragnarök | 2006-07 | Mark Millar, Steve McNiven | Civil War #3 |
| Aegis | 2006-08 | Keith Giffen, Andrea Di Vito | Annihilation: Silver Surfer #3 |
| Children of the Vault | 2006-09 | Mike Carey, Chris Bachalo | X-Men (vol. 2) #188 |
| Korvus | 2006-09 | Ed Brubaker, Billy Tan | Uncanny X-Men #478 |
| Agents of Atlas | 2006-10 | Jeff Parker, Leonard Kirk | Agents of Atlas #1 (Note: The team first appeared as an alternate version of the Avengers in What If #9 (June 1978).) |
| Grindhouse | 2006-10 | Justin Gray, Jimmy Palmiotti | Heroes for Hire (vol. 2) #1 |
| Spider-Woman (Ultimate) | 2006-10 | Brian Michael Bendis, Mark Bagley | Ultimate Spider-Man #98 (Note: The Ultimate character is an alternate version of the Spider-Woman that first appeared in Marvel Spotlight #32 (Feb. 1977).) |
| John the Skrull | 2006-11 | Paul Cornell, Trevor Hairsine | Wisdom #1 |
| Pasco | 2006-11 | Mike Carey, Clayton Henry | X-Men (vol. 2) #191 |
| Ant-Man (Eric O'Grady) | 2006-12 | Robert Kirkman, Phil Hester | Irredeemable Ant-Man #1 |
| Nicodemus West | 2006-12 | Brian K. Vaughan, Marcos Martin | Doctor Strange: The Oath #1 |
| Captain Midlands | 2007-01 | Paul Cornell, Trevor Hairsine | Wisdom #1 |
| Penance (Robbie Baldwin) | 2007-01 | Paul Jenkins, Steve Lieber | Civil War: Front Line #10 (Note: Robbie first appeared as Speedball in Amazing Spider-Man Annual #22 (Jan. 1988).) |
| Daken | 2007-03 | Daniel Way, Steve Dillon | Wolverine: Origins #10 |
| Predator X | 2007-03 | Christopher Yost, Craig Kyle, Paco Medina | New X-Men (vol. 2) #34 |
| Romulus | 2007-03 | Jeph Loeb, Simone Bianchi | Wolverine (vol. 3) #50 |
| Baron Von Blitzschlag | 2007-04 | Dan Slott, Stefano Caselli | Avengers: The Initiative #1 |
| Bob, Agent of Hydra | 2007-05 | Fabian Nicieza | Cable & Deadpool #38 |
| Ev Teel Urizen | 2007-05 | Mike Carey | X-Men (vol. 2) #197 |
| Jackpot | 2007-05 | Dan Slott, Phil Jimenez | Amazing Spider-Man: Swing Shift |
| Overdrive | 2007-05 | Dan Slott, Phil Jimenez | Amazing Spider-Man: Swing Shift |
| Camp Hammond | 2007-06 | Dan Slott, Stefano Caselli | Avengers: The Initiative #1 |
| Cloud 9 | 2007-06 | Dan Slott, Stefano Caselli | Avengers: The Initiative #1 |
| Hardball | 2007-06 | Dan Slott, Stefano Caselli | Avengers: The Initiative #1 |
| Komodo | 2007-06 | Dan Slott, Stefano Caselli | Avengers: The Initiative #1 |
| Michael Van Patrick | 2007-06 | Dan Slott, Stefano Caselli | Avengers: The Initiative #1 |
| Trauma (Terrence Ward) | 2007-06 | Dan Slott, Stefano Caselli | Avengers: The Initiative #1 |
| Wraith (Zak-Del) | 2007-06 | Javier Grillo-Marxuach, Kyle Hotz | Annihilation Conquest: Wraith #1 |
| Gamma Corps | 2007-07 | Frank Tieri, Carlos Ferreira | World War Hulk: Gamma Corps #1 |
| Klara Prast | 2007-07 | Joss Whedon, Michael Ryan | Runaways (vol. 2) #27 |
| Mister Negative | 2007-07 | Dan Slott, Phil Jimenez | Free Comic Book Day: Spider-Man |
| Vin Gonzales | 2007-07 | Dan Slott, Phil Jimenez | Free Comic Book Day: Spider-Man |
| Immortal Weapons | 2007-09 | Ed Brubaker, Matt Fraction, David Aja | Immortal Iron Fist #8 |
| Brett Mahoney | 2007-11 | Marc Guggenheim, Dave Wilkins | Marvel Comics Presents (vol. 2) #1 |
| Hope Summers | 2007-11 | Mike Carey, Chris Bachalo | X-Men (vol. 2) #205 |
| Carlie Cooper | 2007-12 | Dan Slott, Joe Quesada | The Amazing Spider-Man #545 |
| Jazinda | 2007-12 | Peter David | She-Hulk (vol. 2) #22 |
| Victoria Hand | 2007-12 | Brian Michael Bendis, Mike Deodato | Invincible Iron Man #8 |
| Cosmo the Spacedog | 2008-01 | Dan Abnett, Andy Lanning, Wellinton Alves | Nova (vol. 4) #8 |
| Knowhere | 2008-01 | Dan Abnett, Andy Lanning, Wellinton Alves | Nova (vol. 4) #8 |
| Red Hulk | 2008-01 | Jeph Loeb, Ed McGuinness | Hulk (vol. 2) #1 (Note: Red Hulk's alter ego Thunderbolt Ross first appeared in Incredible Hulk #1 (May 1962).) |
| Skaar | 2008-01 | Greg Pak, John Romita Jr. | World War Hulk #5 |
| A-Bomb | 2008-04 | Jeph Loeb, Ed McGuinness | Hulk (vol. 2) #2 (Note: A-Bomb's alter ego, Rick Jones, first appeared in Incredible Hulk #1 (May 1962).) |
| Eli Bard | 2008-04 | Craig Kyle, Christopher Yost, Clayton Crain | X-Force (vol. 3) #1 |
| Ink | 2008-04 | Marc Guggenheim, Yanick Paquette | Young X-Men #1 |
| Menace | 2008-04 | Marc Guggenheim, Salvador Larroca, Joe Quesada, J. Michael Straczynski | The Amazing Spider-Man #550 (Note: Menace's alter ego Lily Hollister first appeared in The Amazing Spider-Man #445 (Jan. 2008).) |
| Phil Coulson | 2008-04 (film); 2012-01 (comics) | | Iron Man (film); Battle Scars #1 (comics) |
| Veranke | 2008-04 | Brian Michael Bendis, Leinil Francis Yu, Jim Cheung | Secret Invasion #1 |
| Zeke Stane | 2008-04 | Matt Fraction, Barry Kitson | Order #8 |
| Faiza Hussain | 2008-05 | Paul Cornell, Leonard Kirk | Captain Britain and MI: 13 #1 |
| Graymalkin | 2008-06 | Marc Guggenheim, Yanick Paquette | Young X-Men #1 |
| Butterball (Emery Schaub) | 2008-07 | Christos Gage, Steve Uy | Avengers: The Initiative #13 |
| Hellfire (J. T. Slade) | 2008-07 | Brian Michael Bendis, Alex Maleev | The Mighty Avengers #13 |
| Sasha Hammer | 2008-07 | Matt Fraction, Salvador Larroca | Invincible Iron Man #1 |
| Secret Warriors | 2008-07 | Brian Michael Bendis, Alex Maleev | The Mighty Avengers #13 |
| Yo-Yo Rodriguez (Slingshot) | 2008-07 | Brian Michael Bendis, Alex Maleev | The Mighty Avengers #13 |
| Deacon | 2008-08 | Jason Aaron, Tan Eng Huat | Ghost Rider (vol. 6) #24 |
| Delphyne Gorgon | 2008-08 | Greg Pak, Fred Van Lente, Clayton Henry | Incredible Hercules #121 |
| Old Man Logan | 2008-08 | Mark Millar, Steve McNiven | Fantastic Four #558 (Note: Old Man Logan is an alternate version of Wolverine, who first appeared in The Incredible Hulk #180 (Oct. 1974).) |
| Ruby Summers | 2008-08 | Peter David, Valentine De Landro | X-Factor: Layla Miller #1 |
| She-Hulk (Lyra) | 2008-08 | Jeff Parker, Karl Hirst Breitweiser | Hulk: Raging Thunder #1 |
| Val Rhymin | 2008-08 | Terry Moore. Humberto Ramos | Runaways #1 |
| Fredzilla | 2008-09 | Chris Claremont, David Nakayama | Big Hero 6 #1 |
| Hiro-Kala | 2008-09 | Greg Pak, Ron Garney | Skaar: Son of Hulk #2 |
| Kraven the Hunter (Ana Kravinoff) | 2008-09 | Marc Guggenheim, Joe Kelly, Mike McKone, Phil Jimenez | The Amazing Spider-Man #565 |
| Wasabi-No-Ginger | 2008-09 | Chris Claremont, David Nakayama | Big Hero 6 #1 |
| Zhou Cheng | 2008-09 | Duane Swierczynski, Travel Foreman | Immortal Iron Fist #17 |
| Anti-Venom | 2008-10 | Dan Slott, John Romita Jr. | The Amazing Spider-Man #569 |
| Lady Bullseye | 2008-10 | Ed Brubaker, Marko Djurdjević, Clay Mann | Daredevil (vol. 2) #111 |
| Master Izo | 2008-10 | Ed Brubaker, Michael Lark | Daredevil #112 |
| Blue Marvel | 2008-11 | Kevin Grevioux | Adam: Legend of the Blue Marvel #1 |
| Cipher | 2008-11 | Marc Guggenheim, Rafa Sandoval | Young X-Men #8 |
| Zadkiel | 2008-11 | Jason Aaron, Tan Eng Huat | Ghost Rider (vol. 6) #27 |
| H.A.M.M.E.R. | 2008-12 | Brian Michael Bendis | Secret Invasion #8 |
| Irani Rael | 2008-12 | Dan Abnett, Andy Lanning, Wellinton Alves, Geraldo Borges | Nova (vol. 4) #18 |
| Norah Winters | 2008-12 | Joe Kelly, Chris Bachalo | Amazing Spider-Man #575 |
| Spider-Man Noir | 2009-02 | David Hine, Fabrice Sapolsky, Carmine Di Giandomenico | Spider-Man: Noir #1 |
| Iron Patriot | 2009-03 | Brian Michael Bendis, Mike Deodato | Dark Avengers #1 |
| Marvel Boy (Noh-Varr) | 2009-03 | Brian Michael Bendis, Mike Deodato | Dark Avengers #1 |
| Hive | 2009-05 | Brian Michael Bendis, Alex Maleev | Secret Warriors #2 |
| Reptil | 2009-05 | Christos Gage, Steve Uy | Avengers: The Initiative featuring Reptil #1 |
| Rescue | 2009-05 | Matt Fraction, Salvador Larroca | Invincible Iron Man #10 |
| Galacta | 2009-06 | Adam Warren, Hector Sevilla Lujan | Marvel Assistant-Sized Spectacular #2 |
| Manifold | 2009-07 | Jonathan Hickman, Stefano Caselli | Secret Warriors #4 |
| Pet Avengers | 2009-07 | Chris Eliopoulos, Ig Guara | Lockjaw and the Pet Avengers #1 (Note: Not named the Pet Avengers until Lockjaw and the Pet Avengers #4 (Oct. 2009).) |
| Wraith (Yuri Watanabe) | 2009-07 | Dan Slott, John Romita Jr. | The Amazing Spider-Man #600 |
| Hippo | 2009-08 | Brian Reed, Chris Bachalo, Tim Townsend | Dark Reign: The Sinister Spider-Man #1 |
| Dark X-Men | 2009-09 | Matt Fraction, Terry Dodson | Uncanny X-Men #513 |
| Red She-Hulk | 2009-09 | Jeph Loeb, Ed McGuinness | Hulk (vol. 2) #15 (Note: Red She-Hulk's alter ego, Betty Ross, first appeared in Incredible Hulk #1 (May 1962).) |
| Tangerine | 2009-09 | Paul Cornell, Leonard Kirk | Captain Britain and MI: 13 #15 |
| Unspoken | 2009-09 | Dan Slott, Christos Gage, Khoi Pham | The Mighty Avengers #27 |
| Aphrodite | 2009-11 | Jeff Parker, Carlo Pagulayan | X-Men vs. Agents of Atlas #2 |
| Gregory Stark | 2009-11 | Mark Millar, Carlos Pacheco | Ultimate Comics: Avengers #2 |
| FrankenCastle | 2010-01 | Gerry Conway, John Romita Sr., Ross Andru, Rick Remender, Jerome Opeña, Tony Moore | Punisher (vol. 8) #11 (Note: Punisher first appeared in Amazing Spider-Man #129 (Feb. 1974).) |
| Intelligencia | 2010-02 | Jeff Parker, Paul Pelletier | Fall of the Hulks: Alpha |
| Jimmy Hudson | 2010-02 | Jeph Loeb, Art Adams | Ultimate Comics: X #1 |
| Bakuto | 2010-03 | Andy Diggle, Antony Johnston, Marco Checchetto | Daredevil #505 |
| Hit-Monkey | 2010-04 | Daniel Way, Dalibor Talajić | Hit-Monkey #1 |
| Tyrone Cash | 2010-04 | Mark Millar, Leinil Francis Yu | Ultimate Comics: Avengers (vol. 2) #1 |
| Detroit Steel | 2010-06 | Matt Fraction, Salvador Larroca | Iron Man (vol. 5) #25 |
| Finesse | 2010-06 | Christos Gage, Mike McKone | Avengers Academy #1 |
| Hazmat | 2010-06 | Christos Gage, Mike McKone | Avengers Academy #1 |
| Mettle | 2010-06 | Christos Gage, Mike McKone | Avengers Academy #1 |
| Striker | 2010-06 | Mike McKone, Christos Gage | Avengers Academy #1 |
| Future Foundation | 2010-07 | Jonathan Hickman, Steve Epting | Fantastic Four #579 |
| Transonic | 2010-07 | Matt Fraction, Kieron Gillen | Uncanny X-Men #526 |
| Janice Lincoln (Lady Beetle) | 2010-08 | Ed Brubaker, Jackson Guice | Captain America #607 |
| Troll | 2010-08 | Jeff Parker, Kevin Walker | Thunderbolts #145 |
| Veil | 2010-08 | Christos Gage, Mike McKone | Avengers Academy #1 |
| Oya | 2010-09 | Matt Fraction, Kieron Gillen | Uncanny X-Men #528 |
| Power Man (Victor Alvarez) | 2010-10 | Fred Van Lente, Mahmud Asrar | Shadowland: Power Man #1 |
| Primal | 2010-10 | Matt Fraction, Kieron Gillen | Uncanny X-Men #529 |
| Velocidad | 2010-10 | Matt Fraction, Kieron Gillen, Whilce Portacio | Uncanny X-Men #527 |
| Annihilators | 2011-01 | Dan Abnett, Andy Lanning | Thanos Imperative: Devastation #1 |
| Max Modell | 2011-01 | Dan Slott, Humberto Ramos | The Amazing Spider-Man #648 |
| June Covington | 2011-01 | Kelly Sue DeConnick, Emma Rios, Warren Ellis, Jamie McKelvie | Osborn #1 |
| Zero (Kenji Uedo) | 2011-01 | Matt Fraction, Kieron Gillen, Salvador Espin | Generation Hope #1 |
| Erik Selvig | 2011-04 (film); 2015-04 (comics) | | Thor (film); Avengers Standoff: Welcome To Pleasant Hill #1 (comics) |
| Agent Venom | 2011-04 | Dan Slott, Paulo Siqueira | The Amazing Spider-Man #654 |
| Massacre | 2011-04 | Dan Slott, Marcos Martín | The Amazing Spider-Man #655 |
| Serpent | 2011-04 | Stuart Immonen, Matt Fraction | Fear Itself #1 |
| War Dog | 2011-04 | Dan Slott, Paulo Siqueira, Ronan Cliquet | Amazing Spider-Man #654 |
| Scorn | 2011-06 | Zeb Wells, Clayton Crain | Carnage #4 |
| Wolf Spider | 2011-06 | Butch Guice, Ed Brubaker | Captain America #617 |
| Miles Morales (Spider-Man) | 2011-08 | Brian Michael Bendis, Sara Pichelli | Ultimate Fallout #4 |
| Broo | 2011-09 | Christos Gage, Juan Bobillo | Astonishing X-Men (vol. 3) #40 |
| America Chavez | 2011-09 | Joe Casey, Nick Dragotta | Vengeance #1 |
| Jefferson Davis | 2011-11 | Brian Michael Bendis, Sara Pichelli | Ultimate Comics Spider-Man #1 |
| Nova (Sam Alexander) | 2011-11 | Jeph Loeb, Ed McGuinness | Marvel Point One #1 |
| Rio Morales | 2011-11 | Brian Michael Bendis, Sara Pichelli | Ultimate Comics Spider-Man (vol. 2) #1 |
| White Tiger (Ava Ayala) | 2011-12 | Christos Gage, Tom Raney | Avengers Academy #20 |
| Hummingbird | 2012-01 | Ryan Stegman, Christopher Yost, Carlo Barberi | Scarlet Spider (vol. 2) #1 |
| Nick Fury Jr. | 2012-01 | Matt Fraction, Christopher Yost, Scot Eaton, Cullen Bunn, Paul Neary | Battle Scars #1 |
| Thori | 2012-02 | Kieron Gillen, Douglas Braithwaite | Journey into Mystery #632 |
| Bagalia | 2012-03 | Rick Remender | Secret Avengers #21.1 |
| Captain Marvel (Carol Danvers) | 2012-07 | Kelly Sue DeConnick, Dexter Soy | The Amazing Spider-Man #9 |
| Alpha | 2012-08 | Dan Slott, Humberto Ramos | The Amazing Spider-Man #692 |
| Eye-Boy | 2012-11 | Jason Aaron, Nick Bradshaw | Wolverine and the X-Men #19 |
| Superior Spider-Man | 2012-11 | Dan Slott, Richard Elson | The Amazing Spider-Man #698 |
| Apex | 2012-12 | Dennis Hopeless, Kev Walker | Avengers Arena #1 |
| Cullen Bloodstone | 2012-12 | Dennis Hopeless, Kev Walker | Avengers Arena #1 |
| Death Locket | 2012-12 | Dennis Hopeless, Kev Walker | Avengers Arena #1 |
| Ex Nihilo | 2012-12 | Jonathan Hickman, Jerome Opeña | Avengers (vol. 5) #1 |
| Ms. Thing (Darla Deering) | 2012-12 | Mike Allred, Matt Fraction | Marvel NOW! Point One #1 |
| Gorr the God Butcher | 2013-01 | Jason Aaron, Esad Ribić | Thor: God of Thunder #2 |
| Titus | 2013-02 | Jeph Loeb, Ed McGuinness | Nova (vol. 5) #1 |
| Aikku Jokinen | 2013-03 | Jonathan Hickman, Stefano Caselli | Avengers (vol. 5) #4 |
| Fabio Medina | 2013-04 | Brian Michael Bendis, Chris Bachalo | Uncanny X-Men (vol. 3) #1 |
| Anna Maria Marconi | 2013-05 | Dan Slott, Giuseppe Camuncoli | Superior Spider-Man #5 |
| Corvus Glaive | 2013-05 | Jonathan Hickman, Jim Cheung | Free Comic Book Day: Infinity |
| Knull | 2013-05 | Jason Aaron, Jackson Guice, Donny Cates, Ryan Stegman | Thor: God of Thunder #6 |
| Angela | 2013-06 | Neil Gaiman, Todd McFarlane | Age of Ultron #10 (Note: Angela's actual first appearance was not in Marvel Comics, but Image Comics' Spawn #9 (March 1993).) |
| Ms. Marvel (Kamala Khan) | 2013-08 | Sana Amanat | Captain Marvel (vol. 8) #14 |
| Black Dwarf | 2013-09 | Jonathan Hickman, Jerome Opeña | New Avengers #8 |
| Black Order | 2013-09 | Jonathan Hickman, Jerome Opeña | New Avengers #8 |
| Ebony Maw | 2013-09 | Jonathan Hickman, Jerome Opeña | New Avengers #8 |
| Grant Ward | 2013-09 (TV); 2015-12 (comics) | | Agents of S.H.I.E.L.D. (TV pilot); All-New, All-Different Marvel Point One #1 (comics) |
| Jemma Simmons | 2013-09 (TV); 2015-02 (comics) | | Agents of S.H.I.E.L.D. (TV pilot); S.H.I.E.L.D. (vol. 3) #1 (comics) |
| Leo Fitz | 2013-09 (TV); 2015-02 (comics) | | Agents of S.H.I.E.L.D. (TV pilot); S.H.I.E.L.D. (vol. 3) #1 (comics) |
| Melinda May | 2013-09 (TV); 2015-02 (comics) | | Agents of S.H.I.E.L.D. (TV pilot); S.H.I.E.L.D. (vol. 3) #1 (comics) |
| Proxima Midnight | 2013-09 | Jonathan Hickman, Jerome Opeña | New Avengers #8 |
| Recorder 451 | 2013-09 | Kieron Gillen, Greg Land | Iron Man (vol. 5) #6 |
| Raina | 2013-10 (TV); 2015-07 (comics) | | Agents of S.H.I.E.L.D. (TV series); Inhuman Annual #1 (comics) |
| Supergiant | 2013-10 | Jonathan Hickman, Jerome Opeña | Infinity #1 |
| Thane | 2013-11 | Jonathan Hickman, Mike Deodato Jr. | New Avengers (vol. 3) #10 |
| Haechi | 2014-03 | Christopher Yost, Marcus To | New Warriors (vol. 5) #2 |
| Nature Girl | 2014-03 | Jason Latour, Mahmud A. Asrar | Wolverine and the X-Men (vol. 2) #1 |
| Minotaur (Dario Agger) | 2014-04 | Jason Aaron, Esad Ribić | Thor: God of Thunder #19 |
| Silk | 2014-04 | Dan Slott, Humberto Ramos | Amazing Spider-Man (vol. 3) #1 Cindy Moon cameo, #4 Silk debut |
| Panda-Mania | 2014-04 | Dan Slott, Humberto Ramos | The Amazing Spider-Man (vol. 3) #1 |
| Eli Morrow | 2014-05 | Felipe Smith, Tradd Moore | All-New Ghost Rider #1 |
| Clash | 2014-06 | Dan Slott, Ramon Perez | The Amazing Spider-Man (vol. 3) #1 |
| Inferno (Dante Pertuz) | 2014-06 | Charles Soule, Joe Madureira | Inhuman #1 |
| Lash | 2014-06 | Charles Soule, Joe Madureira | Inhuman #1 |
| Karn | 2014-09 | Dan Slott, Christos Gage, Giuseppe Camuncoli | Superior Spider-Man #32 |
| Spider-Gwen | 2014-09 | Jason Latour, Robbi Rodriguez | Edge of Spider-Verse #2 |
| Spider-UK | 2014-09 | Jason Latour, Robbi Rodriguez | Edge of Spider-Verse #2 |
| Flint | 2014-10 | Charles Soule, Joe Madureira | Inhuman #3 |
| Iso | 2014-10 | Charles Soule, Ryan Stegman | Inhuman #4 |
| Peni Parker | 2014-10 | Gerard Way, Jake Wyatt | Edge of Spider-Verse #5 |
| White Fox | 2014-10 (webtoon); 2015-12 (comics) | Ko Young-hoon | Avengers: Electric Rain #1 (webtoon) Contest of Champions #1 (comic book) |
| Auran | 2014-12 | Charles Soule, Pepe Larraz, Ryan Stegman | Inhuman #7 |
| Teen Abomination | 2015-01 | Tom Taylor, Yıldıray Çınar | Superior Iron Man #1 |
| Kobik | 2015-06 | Chris Bachalo | Marvel NOW! Point One #1 |
| American Kaiju | 2015-10 | Al Ewing, Gerardo Sandoval | Avengers (vol. 6) #0 |
| Regent | 2015-10 | Dan Slott, Christos Gage, Paco Diaz | Amazing Spider-Man (vol. 4) #1 |
| Luis | 2015-06 (film); 2015-12 (comics) | Edgar Wright, Joe Cornish, Adam McKay, Paul Rudd; Nick Spencer, Ramon Rosanas | Ant-Man (film); Astonishing Ant-Man #1 (comics) |
| Guillotine | 2015-10 (game); 2015-12 (comics) | Al Ewing, Paco Medina | Marvel Contest of Champions (video game) Contest of Champions #1 (comic book) |
| Falcon (Joaquin Torres) | 2015-10 | Nick Spencer, Daniel Acuña | Captain America: Sam Wilson #1 |
| Hala the Accuser | 2015-10 | Brian Michael Bendis, Valerio Schiti | Guardians of Knowhere #3 |
| Moon Girl | 2015-11 | Brandon Montclare, Amy Reeder, Natacha Bustos | Moon Girl and Devil Dinosaur #1 |
| Toni Ho (Iron Patriot) | 2015-12 | Al Ewing, Gerardo Sandoval | New Avengers (vol. 4) #1 |
| Gwenpool | 2016-01 | Chris Bachalo, Christopher Hastings | Howard the Duck (vol. 6) #1 |
| Viv Vision | 2016-01 | Tom King, Gabriel Walta | Vision (vol. 3) #1 |
| Kid Kaiju | 2016-04 | Greg Pak, Frank Cho, Terry Dodson | Totally Awesome Hulk #3 |
| Ironheart | 2016-05 | Brian Michael Bendis, Stefano Caselli | Invincible Iron Man (vol. 2) #7 cameo, #9 full appearance |
| Kid Kree | 2016-05 | Brandon Montclare, Amy Reeder, Marco Failla | Moon Girl and Devil Dinosaur #7 |
| Robert Maverick | 2016-06 | Al Ewing, Gerardo Sandoval | New Avengers (vol. 4) #9 |
| Nadia van Dyne (Wasp) | 2016-07 | Mark Waid, Alan Davis | Free Comic Book Day 2016 Civil War II |
| Weapon H | 2017-09 | Greg Pak, Mike Deodato | Totally Awesome Hulk #21 |
| Cosmic Ghost Rider | 2018-01 | Donny Cates, Geoff Shaw | Thanos (vol. 2) #13 |
| Voyager | 2018-03 (cameo); 2018-11 (full) | Mark Waid, Al Ewing, Jim Zub, Mike Allred, Laura Allred | Marvel Legacy #1 (cameo as statue); Avengers #675 (full) |
| Lin Lie (Sword Master, Iron Fist) | 2018-05 | Shuizhu, Gunji | Warriors of Three Sovereigns #1 |
| Sleeper (symbiote) | 2018-06 | Mike Costa, Mark Bagley | Venom #165 (Note: Not named until Venom: First Host #3 (Nov. 2018).) |
| Grendel | 2018-07 | Donny Cates, Ryan Stegman | Venom (vol. 4) #1 |
| Asgardians of the Galaxy | 2018-09 | Cullen Bunn, Matteo Lolli | Asgardians of the Galaxy #1 |
| One Below All | 2018-11 | Al Ewing, Joe Bennett | Immortal Hulk #5 |
| Jeff the Land Shark | 2019-01 | Kelly Thompson, Daniele di Nicuolo | West Coast Avengers (vol. 3) #7 |
| Nyx | 2019-04 | Al Ewing, Jim Zub, Mark Waid, Joshua James Shaw | Avengers: No Road Home #1 |
| Fauna | 2019-07 | Jonathan Hickman, Pepe Larraz | House of X #1 |
| Wave | 2019-07 | Greg Pak, Leinil Francis Yu | War of the Realms: New Agents of Atlas #1 |
| Psylocke (Kwannon) | 2019-11 | Fabian Nicieza, Andy Kubert, Bryan Edward Hill | Fallen Angels (vol. 2) #1 (Note: First appeared as Kwannon in X-Men (vol. 2) #17.) |
| Summoner | 2019-11 | Jonathan Hickman, Leinil Francis Yu | X-Men (vol. 5) #2 |
| Idyll | 2020-09 | Jonathan Hickman, Leinil Francis Yu | X-Men (vol. 5) #12 |
| Isca the Unbeaten | 2020-09 | Jonathan Hickman, Pepe Larraz | X-Men (vol. 5) #12 |
| Tarn the Uncaring | 2020-09 | Zeb Wells, Carmen Carnero | Hellions #6 |
| White Sword | 2020-09 | Jonathan Hickman, Pepe Larraz | X-Men (vol. 5) #12 |
| Bei the Blood Moon | 2020-10 | Jonathan Hickman, Tini Howard, Pepe Larraz | X of Swords: Stasis #1 |
| Redroot the Forest | 2020-10 | Jonathan Hickman, Tini Howard, Pepe Larraz | X of Swords: Stasis #1 |
| Pogg Ur-Pogg | 2020-10 | Jonathan Hickman, Tini Howard, Pepe Larraz | X of Swords: Stasis #1 |
| Khora of the Burning Heart | 2021-04 | Al Ewing, Valerio Schiti | S.W.O.R.D. (vol. 2) #5 |
| Lactuca the Knower | 2021-06 | Gerry Duggan, Pepe Larraz | Planet-Size X-Men one-shot |
| Sobunar of the Depths | 2021-06 | Gerry Duggan, Pepe Larraz | Planet-Size X-Men one-shot |
| Xilo | 2021-06 | Gerry Duggan, Pepe Larraz | Planet-Size X-Men one-shot |
| Lodus Logos | 2021-09 | Al Ewing, Guiu Vilanova | S.W.O.R.D. (vol. 2) #8 |
| Kobak Never-Held | 2021-10 | Al Ewing, Jacopo Camagni | S.W.O.R.D. (vol. 2) #9 |
| Fisher King | 2022-04 | Al Ewing, Stefano Caselli | X-Men Red (vol. 2) #1 |
| Ora Serrata | 2022-05 | Jonathan Hickman | Legion of X #1 |
| Weaponless Zsen | 2022-05 | Simon Spurrier, Jan Bazaldua | Legion of X #1 |
| Syzya of the Smoke | 2022-09 | Al Ewing, Stefano Caselli | X-Men Red (vol. 2) #6 |
| Spider-Boy | 2023-04 | Dan Slott, Humberto Ramos | Spider-Man (vol. 4) #7 |
| Charlie Tidwell | 2023-06 | Phillip Kennedy Johnson, Nic Klein | The Incredible Hulk (vol. 6) #1 |
| Lycaon Two Wolves | 2023-07 | Al Ewing, Stefano Caselli, Jacopo Camagni | X-Men Red (vol. 2) #13 |
| Madame Monstrosity | 2023-08 | Dan Slott, Paco Medina | Amazing Spider-Man (vol. 6) #31 |
| Orrdon the Omega Rocket | 2023-08 | Al Ewing, Yıldıray Çınar | X-Men Red (vol. 2) #14 |
| Zsora of the Spirit Flame | 2023-09 | Al Ewing, Yıldıray Çınar | X-Men Red (vol. 2) #15 |
| Hellifino | 2023-11 | Dan Slott, Paco Medina | Spider-Boy #1 |
| Boy-Spider | 2024-02 | Dan Slott, Paco Medina | Spider-Boy #4 |
| Spider-Girl (Maka Akana) | 2024-09 | Dan Slott, Michael Cho | Spider-Boy #11 |
| Ben Liu | 2024-10 | Jed MacKay, Ryan Stegman | X-Men (Vol. 7) #2 |
| Calico | 2024-10 | Gail Simone, David Marquez | Uncanny X-Men (vol. 6) #1 |
| Deathdream | 2024-10 | Gail Simone, David Marquez | Uncanny X-Men (vol. 6) #1 |
| Ember | 2024-10 | Gail Simone, David Marquez | Uncanny X-Men (vol. 6) #1 |
| Jitter | 2024-10 | Gail Simone, David Marquez | Uncanny X-Men (vol. 6) #1 |
| Outliers | 2024-10 | Gail Simone, David Marquez | Uncanny X-Men (vol. 6) #1 |
| Ransom | 2024-10 | Gail Simone, David Marquez | Uncanny X-Men (vol. 6) #1 |
| Animalia | 2024-11 | Jed MacKay, Netho Diaz | X-Men (vol. 7) #4 |
| Bronze | 2024-11 | Eve Ewing, Carmen Carnero | Exceptional X-Men #1 |
| Hulkette | 2024-11 | Dan Slott, Mirka Andolfo | Spider-Boy #13 |
| Axo | 2024-12 | Eve Ewing, Carmen Carnero | Exceptional X-Men #2 |
| Melee | 2024-12 | Eve Ewing, Carmen Carnero | Exceptional X-Men #2 |

== See also ==
- Features of the Marvel Universe
- List of alien races in Marvel Comics
- List of Marvel Comics Golden Age characters
- List of Marvel Comics publications
- List of Marvel Comics superhero debuts
- List of Marvel Comics teams and organizations
- List of monsters in Marvel Comics
- List of superhero debuts
- Publication history of Marvel Comics crossover events
