= List of Defenders members =

The Defenders are a loosely organized team of fictional characters mostly, but not solely, superheroes in the Marvel Universe. For much of their history, there was no official membership. Thus, the Defenders had a reputation as being a non-team, a term which was coined in the pages of the comic.

== Original "non-team" ==
=== Founders ===
These characters helped form the team in Marvel Features #1 (December 1971).

| Character | Real Name | Joined in | Notes |
|---|---|---|---|
| Doctor Strange | Dr. Stephen Vincent Strange | Marvel Feature #1 (December 1971). | |
| Hulk | Dr. Robert Bruce Banner | Marvel Feature #1 (December 1971). | |
| Namor the Sub-Mariner | Namor McKenzie | Marvel Feature #1 (December 1971). | |

=== Recruits of the early 1970s ===
| Character | Real Name | Joined in | Notes |
|---|---|---|---|
| Clea Strange | | Marvel Feature #2 (March 1972). | Later became a recurring member in Defenders #39. |
| Silver Surfer | Norrin Radd | Defenders #2 (October 1972). | |
| Valkyrie | Brunnhilde | Defenders #4 (February 1973). | Created by the Enchantress as a mystical combination of the spirit of Brünnehilde the Valkyrie and the body of minor magic user Barbara Denton-Norriss; former member of the Secret Avengers. |
| Hawkeye | Clinton Francis "Clint" Barton | Defenders #7 (August 1973). | Left after issue #10 |
| Nighthawk | Kyle Richmond | Defenders #14 (July 1974). | Reformed member of Squadron Sinister, replaced Namor. |
| Power Man | Lucas "Luke" Cage | Defenders #17 (November 1974). | |
| Son of Satan | Daimon Hellstrom | Giant-Size Defenders #2 (October 1974). | |
| Yellowjacket | Dr. Henry Jonathan "Hank" Pym | Defenders #23 (May 1975). | |

=== Recruits of the mid-1970s ===
| Character | Real Name | Joined in | Notes |
|---|---|---|---|
| Red Guardian | Tania Belinskaya | Defenders #35 (May 1976) | |
| Hellcat | Patricia "Patsy" Walker | Defenders #44 (February 1977). | |
| Devil-Slayer | Eric Simon Payne | Defenders #58 (April 1978). | |
| Wasp | Janet van Dyne | Defenders #77 (November 1979). | |

=== Defenders for a day ===
The team had managed to keep its existence a secret from the general public until a television documentary film by supporting character Dollar Bill announced it to the world. Dollar made a special mention to the currently open membership for the team. Consequently, in Defenders #62 (August 1978), the currently active members were joined by a large number of former associates and new recruits. The majority of the latter served for a single mission before quitting in Defenders #64 (October 1978).

| Character | Real Name | Joined in | Notes |
|---|---|---|---|
| Black Goliath | Dr. William Barrett "Bill" Foster | Defenders #62 (August 1978). | Quit in Defenders #64 (October 1978) |
| Captain Mar-Vell | Mar-Vell | Defenders #62 (August 1978). | Quit in Defenders #64 (October 1978) |
| Captain Ultra | Griffin "Griff" Gogol | Defenders #62 (August 1978). | Quit in Defenders #64 (October 1978) |
| Falcon | Samuel Thomas "Sam" Wilson | Defenders #62 (August 1978). | Quit in Defenders #64 (October 1978) |
| Havok | Alexander "Alex" Summers | Defenders #62 (August 1978). | Quit in Defenders #64 (October 1978) |
| Hercules Panhellenios | | Defenders #62 (August 1978). | Quit in Defenders #64 (October 1978) |
| Iron Fist | Daniel "Danny" Thomas Rand-K'ai | Defenders #62 (August 1978). | Quit in Defenders #64 (October 1978) |
| Jack of Hearts | Jonathan Hart | Defenders #62 (August 1978). | Quit in Defenders #64 (October 1978) |
| Marvel Man | Wendell Elvis Vaughn | Defenders #62 (August 1978). | Quit in Defenders #64 (October 1978) |
| Ms. Marvel | Carol Susan Jane Danver / Car-Ell | Defenders #62 (August 1978). | Quit in Defenders #64 (October 1978) |
| Nova | Richard "Rich" Rider | Defenders #62 (August 1978). | Quit in Defenders #64 (October 1978) |
| Paladin | NA | Defenders #62 (August 1978). | Quit in Defenders #64 (October 1978) |
| Polaris | Dr. Lorna Sally Dane | Defenders #62 (August 1978). | Quit in Defenders #64 (October 1978) |
| Prowler | Hobart "Hobie" Brown | Defenders #62 (August 1978). | Quit in Defenders #64 (October 1978) |
| Stingray | Dr. Walter Newell | Defenders #62 (August 1978). | Quit in Defenders #64 (October 1978) |
| Tagak the Leopard Lord | Tagak | Defenders #62 (August 1978). | Quit in Defenders #64 (October 1978) |
| Torpedo | Brock Jones | Defenders #62 (August 1978). | Quit in Defenders #64 (October 1978) |
| White Tiger | Hector Ayala | Defenders #62 (August 1978). | Quit in Defenders #64 (October 1978) |

=== Rival group ===
Taking advantage of the newfound notoriety of the team, a number of supervillains formed their own rival group of so-called Defenders in Defenders #63 (September 1978). They soon came to conflict with their heroic counterparts and consequently disbanded in Defenders #64 (October 1978).

| Character | Real Name | Joined in | Notes |
|---|---|---|---|
| Batroc the Leaper | Georges Batroc | Defenders #63 (August 1978). | Disbanded in Defenders #64 (October 1978) |
| Beetle | Abner Ronald "Abe" Jenkins | Defenders #63 (August 1978). | Disbanded in Defenders #64 (October 1978) |
| Blob | Frederick J. "Fred" Dukes | Defenders #63 (August 1978). | Disbanded in Defenders #64 (October 1978) |
| Boomerang | Frederick "Fred" Myers | Defenders #64 (August 1978). | Disbanded in Defenders #64 (October 1978) |
| Cap'n Skragg | NA | Defenders #64 (August 1978). | Disbanded in Defenders #64 (October 1978) |
| Electro | Maxwell "Max" Dillon | Defenders #63 (August 1978). | Disbanded in Defenders #64 (October 1978) |
| Joe the Gorilla | NA | Defenders #64 (August 1978). | Disbanded in Defenders #64 (October 1978) |
| Leap-Frog | Vincent Patillio | Defenders #64 (August 1978). | Disbanded in Defenders #64 (October 1978) |
| Libra | NA (Life Model Decoy) | Defenders #64 (August 1978). | Disbanded in Defenders #64 (October 1978) |
| Looter | Norton G. Fester | Defenders #63 (August 1978). | Disbanded in Defenders #64 (October 1978) |
| Melter | Bruno Horgan | Defenders #64 (August 1978). | Disbanded in Defenders #64 (October 1978) |
| Pecos | NA | Defenders #64 (August 1978). | Disbanded in Defenders #64 (October 1978) |
| Plantman | Samuel "Sam" Smithers | Defenders #63 (August 1978). | Disbanded in Defenders #64 (October 1978) |
| Porcupine | Alexander "Alex" Gentry | Defenders #63 (August 1978). | Disbanded in Defenders #64 (October 1978) |
| Sagittarius | NA (Life Model Decoy) | Defenders #63 (August 1978). | Disbanded in Defenders #64 (October 1978) |
| Shocker | Herman Schultz | Defenders #64 (August 1978). | Disbanded in Defenders #64 (October 1978) |
| Toad | Mortimer "Mort" Toynbee | Defenders #64 (August 1978). | Disbanded in Defenders #64 (October 1978) |
| Whirlwind | David "Davey/Dave" Cannon | Defenders #63 (August 1978). | Disbanded in Defenders #64 (October 1978) |

=== Early 1980s recruits ===
| Character | Real Name | Joined in | Notes |
|---|---|---|---|
| Gargoyle | Isaac Christians | Defenders #94 (April 1981). | |
| Beast | Dr. Henry Philip "Hank" McCoy | Defenders #104 (February 1982). | |
| Overmind | Grom | Defenders #115 (January 1983). | The body of Overmind under spiritual possession. |

== New Defenders ==
In Defenders #125 (November 1983) the team was reorganized into a more formal organization, somewhat modeled after the Avengers. By this time, several former members had severed ties with the team.

=== Founders ===
| Character | Real Name | Joined in | Notes |
|---|---|---|---|
| Angel | Warren Kenneth Worthington III | Defenders #125 (November 1983) | Later changed codename to Archangel. |
| Beast | Dr. Henry Philip "Hank" McCoy | Defenders #125 (November 1983) | |
| Gargoyle | Isaac Christians | Defenders #125 (November 1983) | |
| Iceman | Robert Louis "Bobby" Drake | Defenders #125 (November 1983) | |
| Moondragon | Heather Douglas | Defenders #125 (November 1983) | |
| Valkyrie | Brunnhilde | Defenders #125 (November 1983) | |

=== Later recruits ===
| Character | Real Name | Joined in | Notes |
|---|---|---|---|
| Cloud | | Defenders #127 (January 1984) | A sentient nebula who was able to assume human form. At first, it modeled itself after a human female Carol Faber. After falling in love with Moondragon, Cloud also developed a male form that was modeled after Danny Milligan. |
| Candy Southern | Candace "Candy" Southern | Defenders #138 (December 1984). | Angel's former girlfriend who is appointed leader. Deceased. |
| Andromeda | Andromeda Attumasen | Defenders #147 (September 1985). | Member of the Homo mermanus race. Illegitimate daughter of Attuma. |
| Interloper | Betilakk | Defenders #151 (January 1986). | An Eternal. |
| Man-Slaughter | NA | Defenders #151 (January 1986). | A psychotic assassin. |

=== Dragon Circle ===
By the time of Defenders #152 (February 1986), Moondragon had fallen under the control of the Dragon of the Moon. The Dragon led her to attack the Defenders. During the battle, the physical forms of Andromeda, Gargoyle, Interloper, Manslaughter, Moondragon, and Valkyrie were destroyed. Candace Southern retired. Angel, Beast, and Iceman were joined by Cyclops and Marvel Girl in forming X-Factor.

Gargoyle and Moondragon were later able to gain new corporeal forms. However the other four remained disembodied spirits until Doctor Strange, Sorcerer Supreme vol 3 #3–4 (March–April 1989). There they managed to gain temporary but recurring spiritual possession over the bodies of four residents of Swansea, Wales, United Kingdom. These four unknowingly acted as their representatives in forming a successor group of the Defenders.

- Sian Bowen: Host to the spirit of Valkyrie.
- Geneviene Cass: Host to the spirit of Andromeda.
- Will Fanshawe: Host to the spirit of Interloper.
- Roger Loomis: Host to the spirit of Manslaughter.
- Dafydd ap Iowerth: Alleged descendant of King Arthur and host to his spirit.
- Doctor Strange: Associate member.

== Secret Defenders ==
Debuting in Dr. Strange (vol. 3) #50 (February 1993) the Secret Defenders were another successor group to the team. They were very loosely organized, consisting of a leader and the various associates recruited for a mission at hand. They would disband again after each mission. Several "members" were former Defenders. Others had no previous connection to the team. Some served for a single mission while others were recurring members.

=== Founders ===
| Character | Real Name | Joined in | Notes |
|---|---|---|---|
| Doctor Strange | Dr. Stephen Vincent Strange | Dr. Strange (vol. 3) #50 (February 1993) | Initial leader and recruiter of the group. |
| Hulk | Dr. Robert Bruce Banner | Dr. Strange (vol. 3) #50 (February 1993) | |
| Ghost Rider | Daniel "Danny" Ketch | Dr. Strange (vol. 3) #50 (February 1993) | |
| Silver Surfer | Norrin Radd | Dr. Strange (vol. 3) #50 (February 1993) | |

=== Early recruits ===
| Character | Real Name | Joined in | Notes |
|---|---|---|---|
| Spider-Man | Peter Benjamin Parker | Fantastic Four (vol. 1) #374-375 (March–April 1993). | |
| Wolverine | James "Logan" Howlett | Fantastic Four (vol. 1) #374-375 (March–April 1993). | Now a member of the X-Men, the Avengers, the New Avengers, and the co-leader of X-Force. |
| Darkhawk | Christopher "Chris" Powell | Secret Defenders #1 (March 1993). | |
| Nomad | Jack Monroe | Secret Defenders #1 (March 1993). | Served as the third Bucky during the 1950s. Later served as Scourge of the Underworld. |
| Spider-Woman | Julia Carpenter | Secret Defenders #1 (March 1993). | |
| Punisher | Francis G. "Frank" Castle | Secret Defenders #4 (June 1993). | |
| Namorita Prentiss | | Secret Defenders #4 (June 1993). | |
| Sleepwalker | Inapplicable | Secret Defenders #4 (June 1993). | |
| Scarlet Witch | Wanda Maximoff | Secret Defenders #6 (August 1993). | |
| Thunderstrike | Eric Masterson | Secret Defenders #9 (November 1993). | |
| War Machine | James Rupert "Jim" Rhodes | Secret Defenders #9 (November 1993). | |
| Northstar | Jean-Paul Beaubier | Secret Defenders #11 (January 1994). | |
| Nova | Richard "Rich" Rider | Secret Defenders #11 (January 1994). | |

=== Questing villains ===
From Secret Defenders #12-14 (December 1993 and February 1994), the title of characters was an organized group of super-villains, where Thanos was the leader and recruiter of this group. That was in the quest of finding and obtaining the Oracle of Ancient Knowledge. They apparently disbanded after the successful mission.

| Character | Real Name | Joined in | Notes |
|---|---|---|---|
| Thanos | | Secret Defenders #12 (December 1993). | Abandons them in Secret Defenders #13 (January 1994) |
| Geatar | | Secret Defenders #12 (December 1993). | Disbanded in Secret Defenders #14 (February 1994) |
| Nitro | Robert L. Hunter | Secret Defenders #12 (December 1993). | Disbanded in Secret Defenders #14 (February 1994) |
| Rhino | Aleksei Mikhailovich Sytsevich | Secret Defenders #12 (December 1993). | Disbanded in Secret Defenders #14 (February 1994) |
| Super-Skrull | Kl'rt | Secret Defenders #12 (December 1993). | Disbanded in Secret Defenders #14 (February 1994) |
| Titanium Man | Boris Bullski | Secret Defenders #12 (December 1993). | Disbanded in Secret Defenders #14 (February 1994) |

=== Final recruits ===
By Secret Defenders #15 (May 1994), Doctor Strange's duties and circumstances required him elsewhere. He retired after naming Doctor Druid as his replacement. The latter would serve as leader until the group disbanded in Secret Defenders #25 (March 1995).

| Character | Real Name | Joined in | Notes |
|---|---|---|---|
| Doctor Druid | Dr. Anthony Druid | Secret Defenders #15 (May 1994). | The final leader and recruiter of this group. |
| Luke Cage | Lucas "Luke" Cage | Secret Defenders #15 (May 1994). | |
| Deadpool | Wade Winston Wilson | Secret Defenders #15 (May 1994). | |
| Shadowoman | Jillian Marie Woods | Secret Defenders #15 (May 1994). | |
| Cadaver | Cody Fleischer | Secret Defenders #16 (June 1994). | |
| Giant-Man | Dr. Henry Jonathan "Hank" Pym | Secret Defenders #18 (August 1994). | |
| Iron Fist | Daniel "Danny" Thomas Rand-K'ai | Secret Defenders #18 (August 1994). | |
| Archangel | Warren Kenneth Worthington III | Secret Defenders #19 (September 1994). | |
| Iceman | Robert Louis "Bobby" Drake | Secret Defenders #19 (September 1994). | |
| Spider-Woman | Julia Eugenia Cornwall Carpenter | Secret Defenders #20 (October 1994). | |
| Sepulchre | Jillian Marie Woods | Secret Defenders #22 (December 1994). | |
| Dagger | Tandy Bowen | Secret Defenders #23 (January 1995). | |
| Cloak | Tyrone Johnson | Secret Defenders #23 (January 1995). | |
| Deathlok | Michael "Mike" Collins | Secret Defenders #23 (January 1995). | |
| Drax the Destroyer | Arthur Sampson Douglas | Secret Defenders #23 (January 1995). | |

=== Note ===
Before and during the initial few months of publication of Secret Defenders, an advertisement that Marvel used depicted a team consisting of Doctor Strange, Ghost Rider, John Blaze, Maverick, and Wolverine, a team which never existed in the comics. Neither John Blaze nor Maverick were ever part of a Secret Defenders team in any published story.

== Cursed members and The Order ==
In Defenders (vol. 2) #1 (March 2001), four former Defenders were forced to regroup to help Nighthawk and Hellcat in a battle against Yandroth. He was defeated but cursed them to gather every time planet Earth faces a threat. This continued until Defenders (vol. 2) #12 (February 2002). Four members of the team formed The Order. This group attempted to conquer the world in order to protect it. Its activities were featured in The Order #1-6 (April–September 2002). The group disbanded again after Gaia lifted Yandroth's curse which was associated with her.

=== Founders ===
| Character | Real Name | Joined in | Notes |
|---|---|---|---|
| Doctor Strange | Dr. Stephen Vincent Strange | Defenders (vol. 2) #1 (March 2001). | Became a member of The Order. |
| The Incredible Hulk | Dr. Robert Bruce Banner | Defenders (vol. 2) #1 (March 2001). | Became a member of The Order. |
| Namor the Sub-Mariner | Namor McKenzie | Defenders (vol. 2) #1 (March 2001). | Became a member of The Order. |
| Silver Surfer | Norrin Radd | Defenders (vol. 2) #1 (March 2001). | Became a member of The Order. |
| Hellcat | Patricia "Patsy" Walker | Defenders (vol. 2) #1 (March 2001). | |
| Nighthawk | Kyle Richmond | Defenders (vol. 2) #1 (March 2001). | Reformed member of Squadron Sinister. |

=== Recruits ===
| Character | Real Name | Joined in | Notes |
|---|---|---|---|
| Valkyrie | Samantha Parrington | Defenders (vol. 2) #4 (June 2001). | Transformed by the Enchantress to a duplicate of the original Valkyrie in both appearance and powers. |
| Red Raven | Unknown | Defenders (vol. 2) #7 (September 2001). | Associate member. |

=== Recruits against The Order ===
This incarnation of the Defenders was divided among two rival groups. The Order (Doctor Strange, the Hulk, Namor the Sub-Mariner, and the Silver Surfer) and the Defenders (Hellcat, Nighthawk, and Valkyrie). The three decided to recruit the so-called "female analogs" of their former teammates. They would serve until both teams disbanded.

| Character | Real Name | Joined in | Notes |
|---|---|---|---|
| Clea Strange | | The Order #3 (June 2002). | |
| Namorita Prentiss | | The Order #3 (June 2002). | |
| She-Hulk | Jennifer Susan "Jen" Walters | The Order #3 (June 2002). | |
| Ardina | | The Order #4 (July 2002). | An actual female analog of Silver Surfer. It was created by combining the energy drained from him and by the magic of Clea that called the protector Goddesses Apalla (living embodiment of the Sun in Marvel Comics stories), Demeter, Hecate, Jord and Umar. |

== Initiative Team (Last Defenders) ==
Kyle Richmond requested an Initiative version of the Defenders from Tony Stark, intending to fill the ranks with previous Defenders including Gargoyle, Hellcat, and Devil Slayer. However, Stark assembled an entirely different team in hopes of the Defenders maintaining a stable roster for once. The team was officially disbanded after its first mission was deemed a failure.

=== Founders ===
| Character | Real Name | Joined in | Notes |
|---|---|---|---|
| Blazing Skull | Mark Anthony Todd | Last Defenders #1 (May 2008). | |
| Colossus | Piotr Nikolaievitch "Peter" Rasputin | Last Defenders #1 (May 2008). | Leaves the team in Last Defenders #2. |
| Nighthawk | Kyle Richmond | Last Defenders #1 (May 2008). | Reformed member of Squadron Sinister. |
| She-Hulk | Jennifer Susan "Jen" Walters | Last Defenders #1 (May 2008). | Last Defenders #6: Rejoins after the Initiative version of the team disbands. |

=== Last Defenders recruits ===
After the Initiative team disbands, Richmond attempts to continue by hiring registered mercenaries to replace the teammates that Stark had assigned to him. After he was forced to retire from his superhero career, he privately assembles and supports a version of the Defenders based on an encounter with a future version of that team. This team is later forcibly disbanded by H.A.M.M.E.R.

| Character | Real Name | Joined in | Notes |
|---|---|---|---|
| Atlas | Erik Stephan Josten | Last Defenders #3 (July 2008). | |
| Junta | Manuel Diego Armand Vicente | Last Defenders #3 (July 2008). | |
| Paladin | Unrevealed | Last Defenders #3 (July 2008). | |
| Warlord Krang | Krang | Last Defenders #6 (October 2008). | |
| Son of Satan | Daimon Hellstrom | Last Defenders #6 (October 2008). | |
| Nighthawk | Joaquin Pennysworth | Last Defenders #6 (October 2008). | Son of J.C. Pennysworth, Kyle Richmond's former business partner. Becomes a new Nighthawk in a possible future. |

== Fear Itself: The Deep's Defenders ==
This incarnation of the Defenders was formed during the Fear Itself storyline in order to liberate Atlantis from Attuma.

| Character | Real Name | Joined in | Notes |
|---|---|---|---|
| Doctor Strange | Dr. Stephen Vincent Strange | Fear Itself: The Deep #1 (August 2011). | —N/a |
| Namor | Namor McKenzie | Fear Itself: The Deep #1 (August 2011). | —N/a |
| Silver Surfer | Norrin Radd | Fear Itself: The Deep #1 (August 2011). | —N/a |
| Lyra | | Fear Itself: The Deep #1 (August 2011). | Now a student at the Avengers Academy. |
| Loa | Alani Ryan | Fear Itself: The Deep #1 (August 2011). | A student of the X-Men. |

== Defenders Vol. 4 ==
The Defenders came together again when it comes to keeping the Concordance Engine from falling into the wrong hands.

| Character | Real Name | Joined in | Notes |
|---|---|---|---|
| Doctor Strange | Dr. Stephen Vincent Strange | Defenders Vol. 4 #1 (November 2011) | Also a member of the Heroic Age New Avengers team. |
| Namor | Namor McKenzie | Defenders Vol. 4 #1 (November 2011) | Also a former member of the X-Men |
| Silver Surfer | Norrin Radd | Defenders Vol. 4 #1 (November 2011) | —N/a |
| Hulk | Dr. Robert Bruce Banner | Defenders Vol. 4 #1 (November 2011) | —N/a |
| Red She-Hulk | Elizabeth "Betty" Ross Talbot Banner | Defenders Vol. 4 #1 (November 2011) | Joined the team again as Red Harpy in 2021. |
| Iron Fist | Daniel Thomas "Danny" Rand-K'ai | Defenders Vol. 4 #1 (November 2011) | Also a former member of the Heroic Age New Avengers team. |
| Black Cat | Felicia Sara Hardy | Defenders Vol. 4 #8 | —N/a |
| Ant-Man | Scott Edward Harris Lang | Defenders Vol. 4 #10 | —N/a |

== Fearless Defenders ==
| Character | Real Name | Joined in | Notes |
|---|---|---|---|
| Valkyrie | Brunnhilde | The Fearless Defenders #1 (February 2013) | Team leader. Is merged with Annabelle Riggs in The Fearless Defenders #7 (July 2013) |
| Mercedes "Misty" Knight | | The Fearless Defenders #1 (February 2013) | Team leader. |
| Dr. Annabelle Riggs | | The Fearless Defenders #1 (February 2013) | Killed in The Fearless Defenders #6 (July 2013); Returns and becomes Valkyrie's host in The Fearless Defenders #7 (July 2013) |
| Mirage | Danielle "Dani" Moonstar | The Fearless Defenders #2 (March 2013) | —N/a |
| Warrior Woman | Hippolyta | The Fearless Defenders #3 (April 2013) | —N/a |
| Clea Strange | | The Fearless Defenders #7 (July 2013) | —N/a |
| Elsa Bloodstone | | The Fearless Defenders #8 (August 2013) | —N/a |
| Ren Kimura | | The Fearless Defenders #10 (October 2013) | —N/a |
| Nova | Frankie Raye | The Fearless Defenders #12 (December 2013) | —N/a |

== Defenders Vol. 5 ==
A new, street-level team calling themselves the Defenders form to stop crime. This team is based on the Netflix version of the team.

| Character | Real Name | Joined in | Notes |
|---|---|---|---|
| Daredevil | Matthew Michael "Matt" Murdock | Defenders Vol. 5 #1 (August 2017) | —N/a |
| Jessica Jones | Jessica Campbell Jones-Cage | Defenders Vol. 5 #1 (August 2017) | —N/a |
| Luke Cage | Lucas "Luke" Cage | Defenders Vol. 5 #1 (August 2017) | Previous member. Also a member of Heroes for Hire. |
| Iron Fist | Daniel Thomas "Danny" Rand-K'ai | Defenders Vol. 5 #1 (August 2017) | Previous member. Also a member of Heroes for Hire. |

== Defenders Vol. 6 ==
| Character | Real Name | Joined in | Notes |
|---|---|---|---|
| Cloud | | Defenders Vol. 6 #1 (August 2021) | Previously a member of the New Defenders. Left the team after issue #4. |
| Doctor Strange | Dr. Stephen Vincent Strange | Defenders Vol. 6 #1 (August 2021) | —N/a |
| Masked Raider | Carlo Zota | Defenders Vol. 6 #1 (August 2021) | Former member of the Enclave. |
| Red Harpy | Elizabeth "Betty" Ross Talbot Banner | Defenders Vol. 6 #1 (August 2021) | Previously a member of the team as Red She-Hulk. |
| Silver Surfer | Norrin Radd | Defenders Vol. 6 #1 (August 2021) | Left the team after issue #2. |
| Taaia | | Defenders Vol. 6 #3 (October 2021) | Mother of Galan of Taa (later known as Galactus), from the sixth incarnation of the multiverse. |

== Defenders Beyond ==
| Character | Real Name | Joined in | Notes |
|---|---|---|---|
| Blue Marvel | Dr. Adam Bernard Brashear | Defenders Beyond #1 (July 2022) | —N/a |
| Ms. America | America Chavez | Defenders Beyond #1 (July 2022) | —N/a |
| Taaia | | Defenders Beyond #1 (July 2022) | —N/a |
| Tigra | Greer Grant Nelson | Defenders Beyond #1 (July 2022) | —N/a |
| Loki Laufeyson | | Defenders Beyond #1 (July 2022) | —N/a |
| Beyonder | Unrevealed | Defenders Beyond #3 (September 2022) | —N/a |

== Defenders of Light and Dark ==
During the "Queen in Black" crossover event, Iron Man reforms the Defenders, consisting of Team Dark and Team Light, to combat the dual invasions of Knull and Hela.

=== Team Dark ===
| Character | Real Name | Joined in | Notes |
|---|---|---|---|
| Iron Man | Anthony "Tony" Stark | Queen in Black: Defenders of Light and Dark #1 (July 2026) | Founder of both teams and co-team leader |
| Cable | Nathan Summers | Queen in Black: Defenders of Light and Dark #1 (July 2026) | Co-team leader |
| Agent Anti-Venom | Eugene "Flash" Thompson | Queen in Black: Defenders of Light and Dark #1 (July 2026) | —N/a |
| Darkstar | Laynia Petrovna | Queen in Black: Defenders of Light and Dark #1 (July 2026) | —N/a |
| Cloak | Tyrone Johnson | Queen in Black: Defenders of Light and Dark #1 (July 2026) | Previously a member of the Secret Defenders |

=== Team Light ===
| Character | Real Name | Joined in | Notes |
|---|---|---|---|
| Beta Ray Bill | | Queen in Black: Defenders of Light and Dark #1 (July 2026) | Team leader |
| Photon | Monica Rambeau | Queen in Black: Defenders of Light and Dark #1 (July 2026) | —N/a |
| Sunfire | Shiro Yoshida | Queen in Black: Defenders of Light and Dark #1 (July 2026) | —N/a |
| Dagger | Tandy Bowen | Queen in Black: Defenders of Light and Dark #1 (July 2026) | Previously a member of the Secret Defenders |

== Marvel Cinematic Universe ==
Members of "The Defenders" appear in the Marvel Cinematic Universe television series Marvel's The Defenders (2017). Each of the Defenders listed below have an individual series all leading up to the miniseries. They're set to reunite in the third season of Daredevil: Born Again (2027).

| Character | Real Name | Portrayed by | First appearance |
|---|---|---|---|
| Daredevil | Matthew "Matt" Murdock | Charlie Cox | Daredevil Season 1, Episode 1: "Into the Ring" |
| Jessica Jones | Jessica Jones | Krysten Ritter | Jessica Jones Season 1, Episode 1: "AKA Ladies Night" |
| Luke Cage | Carl Lucas | Mike Colter | Jessica Jones Season 1, Episode 1: "AKA Ladies Night" |
| Iron Fist | Daniel "Danny" Rand | Finn Jones | Iron Fist Season 1, Episode 1: "Snow Gives Way" |
