= American Eagle (Marvel Comics) =

- American Eagle's new look, from Thunderbolts #114, artist Mike Deodato

Publication information
- Publisher: Marvel Comics
- First appearance: Marvel Two-in-One Annual #6 (October 1981)
- Created by: Doug Moench (writer); Ron Wilson (penciler)

In-story information
- Alter ego: Jason Strongbow
- Team affiliations: Navajo Nation Division of Public Safety; H.A.M.M.E.R. Agents of Wakanda
- Abilities: Superhuman strength, speed, agility, stamina and sturdiness Enhanced senses Carries a crossbow which fires special bolts

American Eagle (Jason Strongbow) is a Navajo superhero appearing in American comic books published by Marvel Comics.

== Publication history ==
American Eagle first appears in Marvel Two-in-One Annual #6 (October 1981), by writer Doug Moench and penciler Ron Wilson. In the story entitled "An Eagle from America!" Strongbow gains superhuman powers and becomes American Eagle. He joins with Thing, Ka-Zar, and Wyatt Wingfoot to defeat Klaw.

The character subsequently appears in Contest of Champions #1, 3 (June and August 1982), Incredible Hulk (vol. 2) #279 (January 1983), and Rom #65-66 (April 1985-May 1985). He makes several appearances in stand-alone stories in Marvel Comics Presents including issues #27 (September 1989), 128 (May 1993), 130 (June 1993), and 147-148 (February 1994). The story "Just Another Shade of Hate", in issue #27, is its first solo adventure.

The American Eagle is not seen again for some time until his appearance in Thunderbolts #112-115 (May 2007-August 2007) where the writer Warren Ellis and the artist Mike Deodato Jr gave him a new look. American Eagle appears in his own digital comic on Marvel Digital Comics Unlimited published Nov. 12, 2008. Titled American Eagle: Just a Little Old-Fashioned Justice, it is an eight-page story written by Jason Aaron with art by Richard Isanove. This eight-page digital story was later printed in Marvel Assistant-Sized Spectacular #1 (2009). He plays a large role in the story "Homeland" in War Machine (vol. 2) #6-7 (2010) written by Greg Pak. He appears in Heroic Age: Heroes #1 (November 2010) and Fear Itself: The Home Front #5 (October 2011).

American Eagle received an entry in the original Official Handbook of the Marvel Universe #1, in the Official Handbook of the Marvel Universe Deluxe Edition #1, in The Marvel Encyclopedia (2009) and in the Official Handbook of the Marvel Universe A To Z Update #2 (2010).

== Fictional character biography ==
Jason Strongbow is a member of the Navajo Nation who was born in Kaibito, Arizona. He attempted to stop a mining company from excavating a mountain sacred to his tribe. He discovered that the villain Klaw was in league with the mining company. Klaw needed uranium to augment his sonic powers. Strongbow's brother Ward did not agree with him about preserving the mountain. Inside the mine, an argument erupted between the brothers and Klaw which led to violence. During the fight, Klaw used his sonic blaster on the two brothers. A combination of the sonic energy of the blast and the exposure to the uranium gave both of the Strongbow brothers enhanced physical abilities. Klaw fled with his crew and Ward to the Savage Land in hopes of gaining vibranium to augment his powers.

Jason emerged from the mine. Taking inspiration from a flying eagle, he took up the mantle of American Eagle. He followed Klaw to the Savage Land. There, he meets Ka-Zar, Thing, and Wyatt Wingfoot. The four join forces and defeat Klaw and his minions. During the battle, Ward is shot and killed by one of the miners.

American Eagle returned to become a champion of his tribe. Since his battle with Klaw in the Savage Land, he was among the heroes of the world gathered to take part in the Contest of Champions, and helped Rom the Space Knight defeat the Dire Wraiths.

After the 2006 "Civil War" storyline, Jason Strongbow confirms to his friend Steve Rogers that he is strongly against the Super-Human Registration Act, and is planning to fight Iron Man over it. He also bears a new costume with fewer stereotypically Native American attributes, including a leather jacket and a helmet resembling the head and beak of a bald eagle. It is his intent to prevent the Steel Spider from direct confrontation with an angry group of men from Jason's Navajo reservation by persuading the Steel Spider to ease up on his zealous vigilante act.

American Eagle finds the Steel Spider in downtown Phoenix, Arizona, as the Thunderbolts unexpectedly arrive. Steel Spider argues that they will try to kill him and replace him with "Some Good Government Worker". When the Thunderbolts eventually do emerge, Jason decides to ally himself with Steel Spider, shooting the team's leader, Moonstone, through the wrist with a crossbow bolt. After a prolonged fight, Sepulchre becomes involved, and the three defeat Venom, Swordsman, Songbird, and Radioactive Man.

A news reporter stated that because American Eagle lives on a Native American reservation he is exempt from the Registration Act, and that the Commission on Superhuman Activities would take no action against him because of this.

During the "Dark Reign" storyline, it is revealed that Jason is hiding James Rhodes' mother inside the Navajo County. Norman Osborn later tries to convince him to subdue War Machine, because he has no jurisdiction over Jason. Jason refuses to act for anyone other than the interests of the Navajo and fights together with War Machine against a giant Ultimo head Rhodes had found.

American Eagle later appears as a member of the Agents of Wakanda.

== Powers and abilities ==
American Eagle possesses superhuman strength, enabling him to lift (press) approximately 15 tons under optimal conditions. He also possesses superhuman speed, agility, stamina, and sturdiness as a result of radiation-induced mutation. His body tissues are somewhat harder and more resistant to physical injury than that of an ordinary human. However, he is far from invulnerable. While he can be injured by weapons composed of conventional materials, he can withstand impact forces that would severely injure or kill a normal human with little to no injury to show for it. He can run at a maximum speed of 65 miles per hour for approximately 5 hours before tiring to an appreciable degree.

American Eagle's sensory organs have also been fortified by the radiation-induced mutation. Like his namesake, the Eagle, he has hyperkeen eyesight, able to see at 800 feet (240 m) what the average human being sees at 20 feet (6.1 m). His senses of hearing, smell, taste, and touch are approximately three times that of an average human being.

=== Equipment ===
American Eagle also carries a crossbow which fires special bolts.

== Analysis ==
In Native Americans in Comic Books - A Critical Study, Michael A. Sheyahshe notes that while American Eagle "may have some inherent stereotypic issues, the fact that American Eagle's powers come from a non-ethnically based source (and not, say, the Great Spirit) marks a significant improvement for Indigenous characters."

During an interview with Comic Book Resources, the assistant editor Lauren Sankovitch explains why she chose to represent American Eagle in Marvel Assistant-Sized Spectacular #1 (2009):

For a character whose total appearances I could count on my fingers, not to mention having some of the worst costumes in the history of tacky superherowear, I felt American Eagle had such a tremendous potential within the Marvel U as a whole. With his strong identification to his Native American heritage and disaffected attitude towards the larger superhero community, he's a principled man with his own brand of justice. Pair that with his bone-dry sense of humor and take-all-comers power set, he is a force to be reckoned with.

In an interview, Greg Pak, the writer of the story "Homeland" in War Machine (vol. 2) #6-7 (2010), told that American Eagle is easily his "favorite reinvented character of the past decade." The modern character has undergone some transformations compared to its appearances from 1981 to 1994. At the beginning, the character sported a stereotypical costume with feather headdress and buckskin boots. When writer Warren Ellis and artist Mike Deodato Jr. used the character in Thunderbolts, he had a new look with ordinary clothes, a leather jacket, and a helmet resembling the head and beak of a bald eagle.

== Other characters named American Eagle ==
=== World War II ===
James Fletcher is a renowned battlefield hero of World War I who later became the security chief and trainer for Project: Rebirth. He was captured by agents of the Red Skull (Johann Schmidt) and tortured by the Master Interrogator. He refused to yield any information and committed suicide to avoid breaking under further torture.

=== Earth-712 ===
American Eagle is the name of two characters who are members of the Squadron Supreme. The first, Johnathon Dore Sr., is a member of the Golden Agency and a founding member of the Squadron Supreme. He is the father of Squadron member Blue Eagle, who was originally known as American Eagle.
