= Letha (character) =

Publication information
- Publisher: Marvel Comics
- First appearance: Marvel Two-in-One #54 (August 1979)
- Created by: Mark Gruenwald; Ralph Macchio

In-story information
- Alter ego: Hellen Feliciano
- Team affiliations: Grapplers; Masters of Evil
- Abilities: Superb wrestler and hand-to-hand combatant Superhuman strength Carries a variety of weapons within her special leather belts and straps and a rope Ability to tap into the part of the brain that regulates aggression

Letha (Hellen Feliciano) is a supervillain appearing in American comic books published by Marvel Comics. The character is a former member of the female villain team the Grapplers.

== Publication history ==
Letha first appeared in Marvel Two-in-One #54 (August 1979), and was created by Mark Gruenwald and Ralph Macchio.

The character subsequently appeared in Marvel Two-in-One #56-57 (Oct.–Nov. 1979), Dazzler #13 (March 1982), Marvel Two-in-One #96 (Feb. 1983), and The Thing #33 (March 1986). She was killed by the Scourge of the Underworld in Captain America #319 (July 1986). Letha was resurrected in the series Punisher (2009).

Letha received an entry in The Official Handbook of the Marvel Universe Deluxe Edition #18.

== Fictional character biography ==
Hellen Feliciano was a protégée of Auntie Freeze and a founding member of the Grapplers, along with Titania, Poundcakes, and Screaming Mimi. She, like the other Grapplers, was a female wrestler recruited by Roxxon Oil to break into Project Pegasus, but were stopped and served time in prison. Letha and the other Grapplers were empowered by the Power Broker, with Letha gaining superhuman strength.

After Titania is killed by the Scourge of the Underworld, Letha seeks to avenge her death, but is killed by the Scourge along with seventeen other criminals. Long after her death, Letha and the Scourge's victims are resurrected by the Hood to eliminate the Punisher. Letha gains the ability to affect an opponent's aggression, causing them to go berserk with rage. Though Letha and Lascivious fail to kill the Punisher, the Hood allows them to live. Letha later appeared as a member of Max Fury's Masters of Evil.

Letha is next seen working with Poundcakes as they extort money from various business owners in New York City. Letha discovers the Avengers' butler Edwin Jarvis while waiting for Poundcakes during a mission. This led to a battle with the new Wasp, Nadia Pym. Pym manages to defeat both Letha and Poundcakes. However, Pym recruits the two into her organization Geniuses in action Research Labs (G.I.R.L.), believing that they could repent for their past crimes. While working as security officers for G.I.R.L., Letha and Poundcakes continue to pursue a legitimate career in professional wrestling.

== Powers and abilities ==
Letha is a skilled wrestler and hand-to-hand combatant who was known for her highly acrobatic style of fighting. She has superhuman strength (2 tons) following treatment from Power Broker. Letha carries a variety of weapons within her special leather belts and straps.

After her resurrection by the Hood, Letha gained the ability to tap into the amygdala, a part of the brain that regulates aggression. She is able to make her opponents go berserk with murderous rage. She is able to target many individuals at once, such as when she forced a room full of veterans to kill each other in order to get the Punisher's attention.
