= Grapplers (comics) =

Fictional organization in the Marvel Universe

- Cover of Dazzler #13 featuring Titania (top), Screaming Mimi (middle, green), Letha (right) and Poundcakes (left) surrounding Dazzler (bottom)

Publication information
- Publisher: Marvel Comics
- First appearance: Marvel Two-in-One #54 (August 1979)
- Created by: Mark Gruenwald; Ralph Macchio; John Byrne

In-story information
- Type of business: Professional wrestling Mercenaries
- Owner(s): Auntie Freeze
- Employee(s): Battleaxe; Butterball; Cowgirl; Gladiatrix; Lascivious; Letha; Magilla; Poundcakes; Sushi; Vavavoom

The Grapplers is a fictional organization appearing in American comic books published by Marvel Comics. It is a loosely organized group of female wrestlers, most of whom gained superhuman strength through the group known as Power Broker, Inc. The group's first appearance was in Marvel Two-in-One #54, created by Mark Gruenwald, Ralph Macchio, and John Byrne. The group's membership was later expanded in Thing #33 written by Mark Gruenwald.

The original line up consisted of criminals Titania, Letha, Poundcakes, and Screaming Mimi, organized by Auntie Freeze. The original Grapplers closely resemble members of the DC Comics' group the Female Furies. Screaming Mimi would later become a superhero under the name "Songbird", while Titania was later renamed "Lascivious".

== Publication history ==
The Grapplers first appeared in Marvel Two-in-One #54-56 (August–October 1979), and were created by writers Mark Gruenwald, Ralph Macchio, and artist John Byrne. Joe Sinnott was the inker of their first appearance, John Costanza was the letterer and Bob Share was the colorist. The Grapplers were later brought back as part of the Unlimited Class Wrestling Federation storyline in the Thing comic book series, with new members introduced in The Thing #33, with new members of the team being created by the writer Mike Carlin and artist Ron Wilson.

Auntie Freeze, Butterball, Capiole, Cowgirl, Magilla, Sushi, and Vavavoom have not appeared in the Marvel Universe since Thing #33, except in flashback form.

The Grapplers received an entry in the appendix of the first volume of the Official Handbook of the Marvel Universe, and a full team entry in volume two including Titania, Poundcakes, Screaming Mimi, Letha, Auntie Freeze, Battleaxe, Sushi, Butterball, Vavavoom, Magilla, Cowgirl, and Gladiatrix. The team also had an entry in issue 5 of the Gamer's Handbook of the Marvel Universe covering the original five members as well as Battleaxe. The team was also covered in the Marvel Encyclopedia Vol 1 "Fantastic Four".

== Fictional history ==
Titania, Letha, Poundcakes, and Screaming Mimi, the original four Grapplers, were drafted by the Roxxon Oil Company to invade Project: Pegasus, along with the warrior Thundra. They were given designed costumes and specialized weaponry to heighten their formidable prowess at physical combat. However, Quasar and Giant-Man defeated the quartet and gave them over to authorities.

The group later attacked Dazzler while they were all incarcerated at Ryker's Island in attempt to get vengeance after Klaw's seeming death at her hands. After getting beaten to near death, Dazzler was able to defeat the Grapplers with a light blast.

The Grapplers then escaped prison and planned to attack the Thing with several other super-villains, though the Avengers, the X-Men, the Fantastic Four, and various other super-heroes foiled their plans. Afterward, the Grapplers decided to halt their illegal activities and become legitimate wrestlers. They soon branched out, and several new members joined their ranks. Soon after, Titania was killed by the Scourge of the Underworld. The Scourge of the Underworld killed Letha as well when she tried to investigate Titania's death. Screaming Mimi later joined the Thunderbolts, while Poundcakes became a freelance mercenary.

Letha and Titania were resurrected years later by the Hood, alongside several other victims of the Scourge. The Hood also gifted the pair with new powers: Letha with the ability to inspire irrational rage telepathically and Titania with the ability to inspire irrational lust. Titania took the codename Lascivious to better represent her new power set.

The Grapplers then resurfaced, consisting of Letha, Lascivious, Poundcakes, and a new Screaming Mimi. Together, they battled their old teammate Songbird, but were defeated and arrested with the exception of the new Screaming Mimi who was a teenage runaway forced to work with them.

The Grapplers escaped imprisonment, and in subsequent appearances often appeared individually or in pairs. Poundcakes was seen breaking out of the Raft alongside Moonstone and several other female criminals. Letha and Lascivious were recruited into the Masters of Evil and spent time in Bagalia. Letha and Poundcakes were later seen with the second Titania, Mary MacPherran, at a bar.

Artificial constructs of Grapplers members Poundcakes, Battleaxe, and Gladiatrix were used by Yon-Rogg to battle Captain Marvel, though they were quickly defeated. Similarly, Arcade used constructs of the original Grapplers to battle Dazzler.

As part of the All-New, All-Different Marvel, Letha and Poundcakes appeared as hired extortionists. They battled Nadia Pym, the new Wasp, along with her allies. The Grapplers' defeat led to their imprisonment, though Nadia and Janet Van Dyne later hired them as bodyguards for their new "G.I.R.L." (Genius In action Research Labs) initiative.

== Membership ==
The original Grapplers, (Titania, Letha, Screaming Mimi, and Poundcakes) and the later retconned leader Auntie Freeze, bear a superficial resemblance to the Female Furies, from Jack Kirby's New Gods (first seen in 1972) as well as mirroring their superpowers.

=== Titania / Lascivious ===
Titania (Davida DeVito) was the field leader of the original Grapplers. She wielded an energy rod which enabled her to blast long-range bursts. When the Grapplers were imprisoned, Titania became the leader of the women's wing. While she was crafty, she was also a very sore loser, and the other Grapplers were worried about their reputation after Titania's defeat at the hands of Battleaxe. After the Grapplers attempted to go legitimate as professional wrestlers, Titania was killed by the Scourge of the Underworld posing as a new recruit, Golddigger. She is not to be confused with the more recent Titania, who took her name around the time of her death. Titania, along with her former teammate Letha, was revived by The Hood during "Dark Reign". The Hood bestowed new powers to DeVito, allowing her to incite uncontrollable lust in those around her. She adopted the new codename Lascivious.

=== Letha ===
Letha (Hellen Feliciano) is a blonde bombshell who specialized in acrobatic wrestling. She also used specialized leather belts and straps, though she most often battles in hand-to-hand combat. While the other Grapplers were notable for their strong, feminist personalities, Letha instead had a very feminine personality, often flirting with the enemies or showing concern over fashion. After Titania was killed by the Scourge of the Underworld, Letha joined Firebrand and several other super-villains as they plotted a way to stop the vigilante. However, Letha and the others were soon shot to death by the Scourge themselves. Letha, along with Titania (now called Lascivious), was revived by The Hood during "Dark Reign". Similar to Lascivious, Letha gained new abilities that enabled her to drive those around her into a murderous rage.

=== Poundcakes ===
Poundcakes (Marian Pouncy) is an ex-convict who joined the Grapplers despite her record. She was equipped with seismic boots by Roxxon, which enabled her to create shock waves and tremors by stomping the ground. Slightly overweight, Poundcakes was the strongest member of the Grapplers. After Titania and Letha had been killed by the Scourge of the Underworld, Poundcakes became a freelance mercenary. She battled Captain America several times and eventually joined the Femizons, though her stay with Superia was short-lived. She returned to mercenary work and rejoined the Grapplers when Titania (now called Lascivious) and Letha were resurrected by the Hood.

=== Screaming Mimi ===
Screaming Mimi (Mimi Schwartz/Melissa Gold) met Poundcakes in prison and soon after, was invited to join the Grapplers. Roxxon operated on Mimi's vocal cords, giving her the ability to drive a person to insanity with her screams. The only Grappler who is not capable of superhuman strength, Screaming Mimi proved useful on several missions. Soon after Titania and Letha were killed, Screaming Mimi joined the Masters of Evil, and eventually turned over a new leaf, calling herself Songbird and joining the Thunderbolts.

=== Auntie Freeze ===
Auntie Freeze (Ann Fraley) used to be a professional wrestler and was the founder of the Grapplers. Each of the four original Grapplers were protégés of Auntie Freeze, and despite her promotion, the Grapplers were unable to gain popularity. She was then contacted by Roxxon, who fitted the four girls to become mercenaries. She later came up with the idea to merge with the Unlimited Class Wrestling Federation (UCWF) and have the girls become legitimate wrestlers to put their past behind them, though the original four did not stick with the idea.

=== Later recruits ===
==== Battleaxe ====
Battleaxe (Anita Ehren) is a wrestler who uses a pair of axes as her weapon of choice in addition to her superhuman strength, listed as being in the 50-75 ton range. Among the new recruits, Battleaxe was the only one to succeed in defeating an original member of the Grapplers, Titania. After Titania's murder, Battleaxe blamed the Thing and later battled him in the ring herself. She defeated him but discovered he allowed her to win and she declared the battle void. Later, she joined the Femizons and battled Captain America, as well as the BAD Girls, Inc. Most recently, she was seen battling Ms. Marvel, though she was quickly defeated.

==== Butterball ====
Butterball (Vivian Dolan) is an overweight wrestler who uses her massive body as a weapon, often by throwing herself at an enemy. She joined the second version of the Grapplers, who worked for the Unlimited Class Wrestling Federation.

==== Capriole ====
Capriole (real name not revealed) is one of the women who joined the Grapplers in the Unlimited Class Wrestling Federation. Presumably she has the same augmented strength as the other Grapplers that underwent the Power Broker's augmentation process, but it was not depicted. She was only part of the group in their initial UCWF appearance.

==== Cowgirl ====
Cowgirl (Deb Lowry) is a cowboy-themed wrestler with the same augmented strength of the other Grappers who underwent the augmentation process by the Power Broker. While she wears a gun holster and a gun, it is not clear if it is just a prop or not as she has not been depicted as using it.

==== Gladiatrix ====
Gladiatrix (Robbin Braxton) is a professional wrestler. Unlike the other new recruits, Gladiatrix chose to use her massive strength for the good of mankind, though she did serve briefly as an agent of Superia's Femizons. She participated in the Civil War and was commended for her duties as a super-hero. At one point, she tried to join the Avengers, but was inevitably rejected.

==== Magilla ====
Magilla (Sandy Stalmaster) is a wrestler from the UCWF who was given superhuman abilities by the Power Broker and took the name Magilla, as her whole body was covered in hair. Magilla only appeared as part of the initial UCWF storyline, but was not shown as being part of the Grapplers in later appearances.

==== Sushi ====
Sushi (Susan Hayakawa) is a Japanese wrestler who uses karate as her fighting style in addition to her augmented strength. Sushi only appeared as part of the initial UCWF storyline, but was not shown as being part of the Grapplers in later appearances.

==== Vavavoom ====
Vavavoom (Dawn Middlebury) is a wrestler known for her beauty. She possess the same enhanced strength as the rest of the UCWF based Grapplers. While the other Grapplers are known for their muscles, Vavavoom is quite petite and the most conventionally attractive of the group. Vavavoom only appeared as part of the initial UCWF storyline, but was not shown as being part of the Grapplers in later appearances.

== In other media ==
- Poundcakes appears in M.O.D.O.K., voiced by Whoopi Goldberg. This version is an illiterate mutant who hangs out at the Bar with No Name and won numerous trophies in high school, only to be stripped of them after her mutant status was revealed.
- Poundcakes appears in Lego Marvel's Avengers via the "Classic Captain Marvel" DLC pack.
