= Miracle Man =

Marvel Comics fictional character

- The Miracle Man as depicted in Fantastic Four #3 (March 1962). Art by Jack Kirby.

Publication information
- Publisher: Marvel Comics
- First appearance: Fantastic Four #3 (March 1962)
- Created by: Stan Lee (writer); Jack Kirby (artist)

In-story information
- Alter ego: Joshua Ayers
- Species: Human
- Notable aliases: Brother Joshua; Professor
- Abilities: (Currently): Hypnotism; (Formerly): Matter manipulation

The Miracle Man (Joshua Ayers) is a supervillain appearing in American comic books published by Marvel Comics. The character was created by Stan Lee and Jack Kirby as one of the first enemies of the Fantastic Four. He was originally depicted as a stage magician with megalomaniacal desires, capable of convincing others through hypnosis that he has amazing powers. In subsequent appearances, he appears to obtain actual, significant superpowers that allow him to mentally control and rearrange matter, but this turns out to be yet another illusion. Miracle Man becomes one of the many minor Marvel Comics supervillains to be killed by the Scourge of the Underworld, but is resurrected much later by the demon Dormammu (as a parasite of Hood).

== Publication history ==
The Miracle Man first appeared in Fantastic Four #3 (March 1962) and was created by writer Stan Lee and artist Jack Kirby.

== Fictional character biography ==
Miracle Man is an arrogant stage magician who harbors megalomaniacal desires. The Fantastic Four attend his stage show, and Miracle Man taunts them during his display of ostensibly superior powers, which includes such feats as levitation, transforming himself into mist, and enlarging himself to giant form. He goads the enraged Thing into an on-stage contest of strength, which he wins as well.

Miracle Man declares war on humanity and commits a jewel heist, through the aid of a giant prop monster he animates. The police call upon the Fantastic Four to stop him, but Miracle Man bests them in a series of encounters and hypnotizes the Invisible Girl into obeying him. However, after the Human Torch blinds him with a flare of fire, he is captured easily and his powers are explained as deriving from nothing more than hypnotism.

=== Later appearances ===
The Miracle Man as depicted in Fantastic Four #139 (October 1973). Art by John Buscema and Joe Sinnott.

The Miracle Man next appears as the villain in a two-issue story arc in Fantastic Four #138-139 (1973). The Fantastic Four encounter him on a remote Native American reservation, while investigating an attack on villages of the tribesmen of Wyatt Wingfoot. They mock him until he demonstrates that he now has legitimate superpowers, including the ability to control matter and fire blasts of energy. The Human Torch recounts the Fantastic Four's first encounter with Miracle Man to new teammate Medusa. (Note: The Inhuman Medusa serves as a temporary replacement for the Invisible Girl in Fantastic Four #132-159.)

Miracle Man agrees with the Torch's version of their first encounter, and then continues to explain what has subsequently happened to him. He recounts that while in prison, he researched books on the power of "mind over matter." After being released, he sought out a mysterious band of Native Americans known as the Silent Ones, who taught him how to mentally control matter. He then buried his teachers in a rockslide with his newfound powers. Finished with his story, he causes the earth to open up and swallow the Fantastic Four whole.

The Fantastic Four survive Miracle Man's attack. After creating his own advanced city to rule, Miracle Man battles the Thing in hand-to-hand combat while the other heroes fight his creations. Meanwhile, a group of military commanders are informed that an outside force is draining the world's nuclear weapons stockpile of protons, making the weapons unstable and threatening a worldwide nuclear explosion. Before this can come to pass, Miracle Man suddenly vanishes, having been taken away by the Silent Ones.

Thing and Ghost Rider team up against Miracle Man, who has once again overpowered the Silent Ones to escape prison. After Ghost Rider proves immune to his powers, and the Thing blinds him with a handful of sand, he is reclaimed by the Silent Ones. He subsequently appears in The Defenders, having taken refuge in a monastery after the Silent Ones gave him amnesia. He regains his memories and powers, and steals the "Darksoul" from Daimon Hellstrom, who had traveled to the monastery on a personal quest for meaning. Now professing a desire to help others, Miracle Man transports himself and the Defenders to the poverty-stricken island of Java, which he attempts to turn into a paradise. When a blind man refuses to give up his affliction, considering it a divine gift, Miracle Man is overcome by rage and turns again to violence. Hellstrom regains control over the Darksoul and Miracle Man loses his powers.

Miracle Man embarks on a mission to regain his powers. While aiding the Rhino in a fight against the Thing, Miracle Man is shot and killed by the Scourge of the Underworld. (Note: The story of the Scourge hunting supervillains crossed over into most Marvel titles, each of which would usually depict a single villain's unexpected execution by the Scourge without elaboration or explanation. The vigilante's main story was featured in Captain America.)

Miracle Man is later among the eighteen criminals, all murdered by the Scourge, who are resurrected by Hood using the power of Dormammu as part of a squad assembled to eliminate the Punisher. He battles the Punisher while posing as a member of the Avengers, and escapes after the fight.

== Powers and abilities ==
The Miracle Man is a master hypnotist, able to mesmerize others with his glance and then, induce hallucinations onto anyone he wishes. He can cast a variety of illusions to make those under his influence would see, hear, touch, and even taste or smell their effects. Later, he developed the ability to rearrange various forms of matter by thought.
