= Enforcer (comics) =

Fictional character

Enforcer is a fictional character appearing in American comic books published by Marvel Comics.

== Publication history ==
The first Enforcer first appeared in Ghost Rider #22-24 (February–June 1977), and was created by Gerry Conway, Don Glut, and Don Heck. The character subsequently appeared in Spider-Woman #19 (October 1979), #27-29 (June–August 1980), Ghost Rider #58 (July 1981), and Spider-Woman #50 (June 1983). He was killed by the Scourge of the Underworld in Iron Man #194 (May 1985). The Enforcer received an entry in the Official Handbook of the Marvel Universe Deluxe Edition #17.

== Fictional character biography ==
=== Charles L. Delazny, Jr. ===
Enforcer

Publication information
- Publisher: Marvel Comics
- First appearance: Ghost Rider #22 (Feb 1977)
- Created by: Gerry Conway, Don Glut, and Don Heck

In-story information
- Alter ego: Charles L. Delazny, Jr.
- Team affiliations: Committee
- Notable aliases: Carson Collier, Jr.

Charles Delazny Jr. was born in San Jose, California. He is a criminal mercenary and son of Charles Delazny Sr., owner of Delazny Studios. Beginning a criminal career, he employs an elderly scientist named Dr. Ignatz Goldman, who designs Charles' costume. Charles then takes on the costumed identity of the Enforcer.

To obtain a disintegrator ray generator, Enforcer hires Gladiator to steal it from Eel, who was in possession of the device. Enforcer encounters Eel in the alley and claims the device as Gladiator kills Eel. Enforcer brings the device to Dr. Goldman, who modifies it into a medallion.

Enforcer arrives at the Belaire mansion to confront the "boss" of the criminal organization that gained control of Delazny Studios. He then announces that he is taking over the organization. When the boss of the criminal organization threatens Enforcer, he is disintegrated. The boss' henchmen swear allegiance to Enforcer. Dr. Goldman later miniaturizes the medallion further into a ring. As Enforcer and his henchmen head to San Diego Naval Yards, they are followed by Ghost Rider. Enforcer escapes, but his ring falls into the water during the fight.

Enforcer approaches Water Wizard and offers him a million dollars if he can eliminate Ghost Rider. Water Wizard uses his powers to create 1,000 liquid beings to recover Enforcer's ring from San Diego Harbor. Enforcer later has Water Wizard ambush Ghost Rider, which ends with Ghost Rider being knocked out. Enforcer has the unconscious Johnny Blaze strapped to a motorcycle and sent off the cliff. Johnny regains consciousness and turns into Ghost Rider as the motorcycle goes off the cliff. Ghost Rider arrives in Enforcer's base and defeats him and Water Wizard.

While Enforcer is serving time in California State Prison, he receives a private visit from newspaper tycoon Rupert Dockery, who gives him a cane with a hidden blade. This allows Enforcer and four other inmates to overpower the guards and escape. Enforcer then plans revenge against Spider-Woman. He steals a bronze representation of Anansi from the Los Angeles Museum of Anthropology and Folk Art in order to lure Spider-Woman to him, then defeats and captures her. When her criminologist partner Scotty McDowell tries to rescue her, the Enforcer shoots him with a psycho-chemical incendiary dart that will soon incinerate him.

Enforcer offers to give Spider-Woman an antidote to the dart if she helps him steal $10,000,000, enough for him to retire. He strings her along for some weeks, during which the two of them work together to pull off three major heists. He then reveals to her that he never had an antidote, and gloats over the fact that she has made herself a wanted criminal for nothing.

Enforcer is later hired by Madame Masque (on behalf of Obadiah Stane) to kill the criminal Termite. However, he is shot and killed by the Scourge of the Underworld.

=== Mike Nero ===
A new Enforcer is one of a collection of supervillains featured in Dark Reign: Made Men. This Enforcer is Mike Nero, the nephew of the original Enforcer. Following the death of his uncle, Mike Nero becomes the new Enforcer and learns to deal with supernatural threats. The Hood inspects Enforcer's stash of mystical artifacts and offers Enforcer a role in his criminal organization as a supernatural specialist. Enforcer refuses and escapes through a glass window.

== Powers and equipment ==
The first Enforcer wore body armor with a silver-nitrate covered vest for protection from werewolves. He carried two .45 caliber guns with which he used normal ammunition, silver bullets, tranquilizer pellets, pyrogranulate capsules, and a "tingler" that changes the victim's metabolism, causing the victim to burst into flame by post-hypnotic command. He also wore a disintegrator amulet, later in the form of a ring.
