= Benjamin Walker (actor) =

American actor and comedian (born 1982)

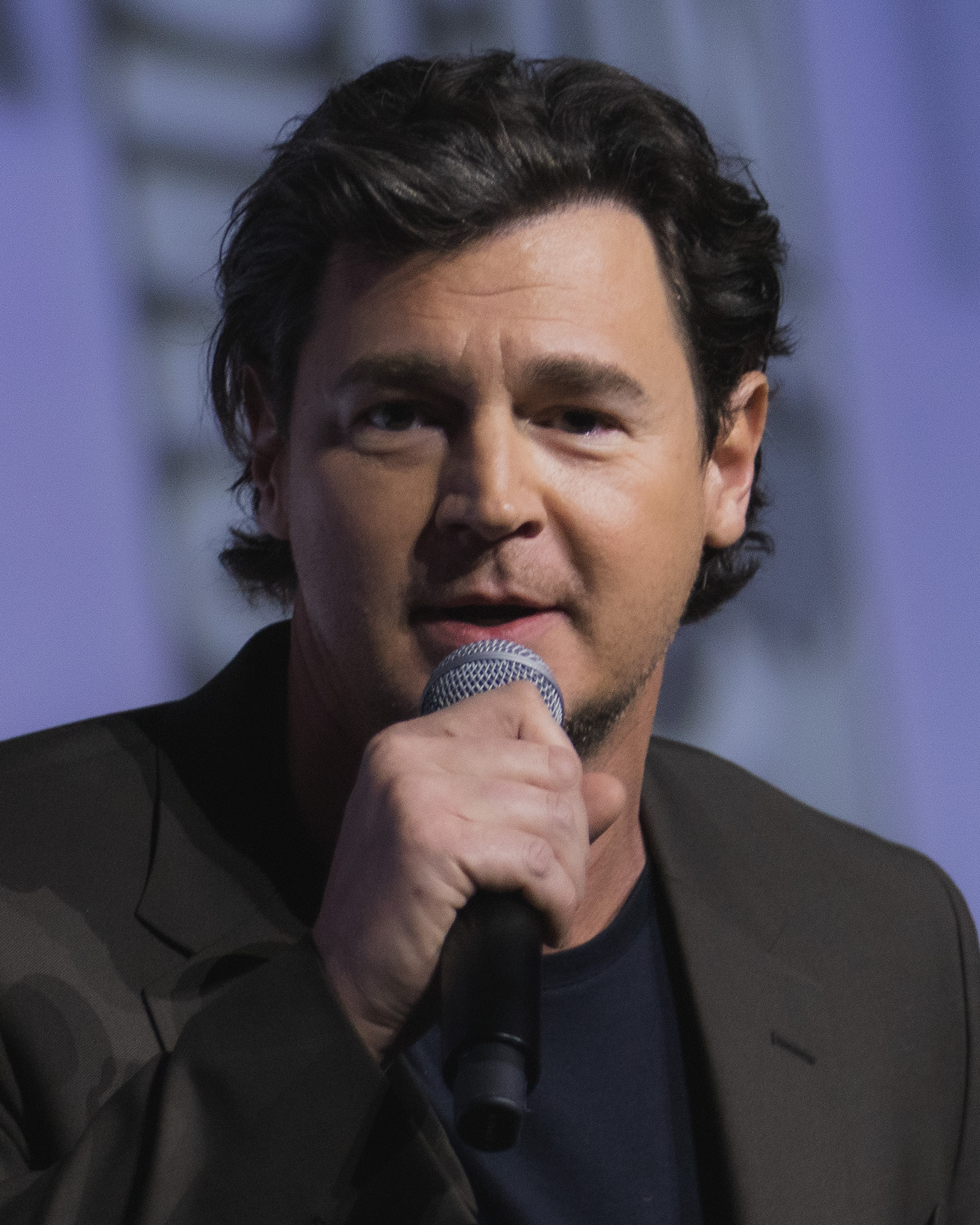
- Walker in 2026
- Born: Benjamin Walker Davis; June 21, 1982 (age 44); Cartersville, Georgia, U.S.
- Education: Juilliard School (BFA)
- Occupations: Actor; comedian
- Years active: 2004–present
- Spouses: Mamie Gummer (m. 2011; div. 2013); Kaya Scodelario (m. 2015; div. 2024)
- Children: 2

Benjamin Walker Davis (born June 21, 1982) is an American actor and stand-up comedian. He starred as Andrew Jackson in the musical Bloody Bloody Andrew Jackson, which premiered on Broadway in 2010. He has appeared in a number of Broadway productions, notably as Patrick Bateman in the 2016 musical adaptation of the novel American Psycho and as Chris Keller in the 2019 revival of All My Sons, for which he was nominated for a Tony Award for Best Featured Actor. On screen, he is known for his title role in the 2012 film Abraham Lincoln: Vampire Hunter, as well as his appearances in the films Kinsey, Flags of Our Fathers, and In the Heart of the Sea. In 2019, he starred as Erik Gelden in the third and final season of the Netflix series Jessica Jones. He plays High King Ereinion Gil-galad in the Amazon Prime Video series The Lord of the Rings: The Rings of Power.

== Early life ==
Walker was born in Cartersville, Georgia, the younger of two boys born of Jeannine (née Walker), a music teacher, and Greg Davis, who owned a movie rental store and works in financial services. He took his mother's maiden name as his stage name because there was a Benjamin Davis already registered with the Screen Actors Guild. He attended Cartersville High School in Cartersville, the Interlochen Arts Academy near Traverse City, and the Juilliard School in New York City. He graduated from the Juilliard Actor Training Program in 2004.

== Acting career ==
=== Stage work ===
In February 2007, Walker portrayed Bertram Cates in the Broadway revival of Inherit the Wind. The production opened at the Lyceum Theatre on April 12 and enjoyed a 10-week run to a full house. The show was nominated for four Tony awards, including Best Revival. In April 2008, Walker appeared as the Chevalier Danceny in the Roundabout Theatre Company's production of Les Liaisons Dangereuses. He played the inexperienced lover who becomes the sex pawn of the pernicious La Marquise de Merteuil. Described as the "definitive battle of the sexes" by Broadway World, the production enjoyed a full house and was nominated for six Tony awards.

In December 2007, Walker starred as Andrew Jackson in the musical Bloody Bloody Andrew Jackson during its world premiere at the Center Theatre Group's Kirk Douglas Theatre in Los Angeles. In 2010, he reprised his role in the musical, first off-Broadway at the Public Theater and then at the Bernard B. Jacobs Theatre on Broadway. The musical enjoyed a successful, but short, run. It was also a critical hit, but was nominated for few awards. Walker starred in numerous incarnations of the show to great critical acclaim, including Bloody Bloody Andrew Jackson: The Concert Version (a four-week workshop run at Public Theater in March 2009), and the thrice-extended return at the Public Theater in March 2010. The production closed on January 2, 2011.

From 2012 to 2013, Walker portrayed Brick in a revival of Cat on a Hot Tin Roof. His other stage credits include The Arrangements at the Atlantic Theatre Company (2005), the Lincoln Center Theater workshop of Spring Awakening (2005), Lady Windermere's Fan (2005), Romeo and Juliet (2006), and American Psycho (2016). He received a Tony Award nomination for Best Featured Actor in a Play for his performance in the 2019 Broadway revival of All My Sons.

=== Film work ===
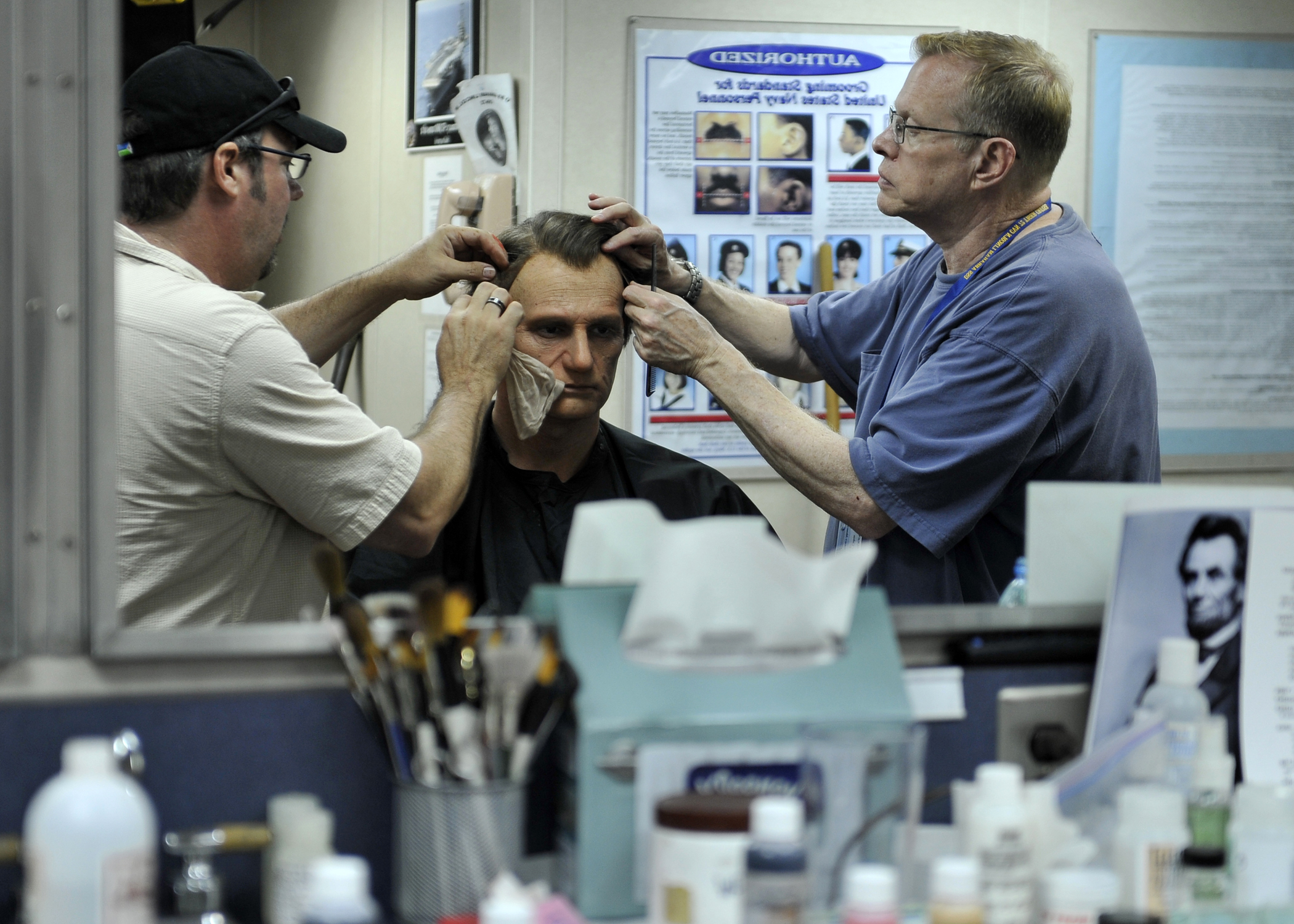
Walker getting into character as Abraham Lincoln in 2012

Walker starred in the short film All Saint's Day (2007), which was the Savannah College of Art and Design winner for the narrative short category. In 2009, he appeared in the independent films Coach and The War Boys. In 2010, Walker was cast as Hank McCoy/Beast in X-Men: First Class, but dropped out of the role to star in the Broadway musical Bloody Bloody Andrew Jackson. It was announced in January 2011 that Walker would star as Abraham Lincoln in the film adaptation of Abraham Lincoln, Vampire Hunter. The film was released in June 2012. Walker told Rolling Stone magazine that he read a number of biographies on Lincoln to prepare for the role. He was cast as Archangel Michael in the film adaptation of Paradise Lost, but production was cancelled in 2012. He starred as Kevin Connolly in the 2013 film Muhammad Ali's Greatest Fight.

=== Television work ===
Walker has appeared in television series such as Traitors (miniseries) (2019), Jessica Jones (2019), The Underground Railroad (2021), and The Lord of the Rings: The Rings of Power (2022–present).

== Stand-up comedy career ==
Walker has performed stand-up comedy at Caroline's, Comedy Village, and The Comedy Store. His comedy show, Find the Funny, features comics and taped short narratives and skits, and is performed regularly in New York City.

== Personal life ==
Walker became engaged to actress Mamie Gummer in 2009, and they were married in 2011. They lived in an apartment in Park Slope, Brooklyn. In March 2013, it was announced that they had amicably separated and planned to divorce.

Walker began dating his co-star, Kaya Scodelario, in April 2014. They became engaged on December 28, 2014. He and Scodelario married in late 2015 and both adopted the surname "Scodelario-Davis". The couple had a son in November 2016. In September 2021, the couple announced they were expecting their second child, a girl, who was born in December 2021. In February 2024, the couple announced their separation.

== Works and performances ==
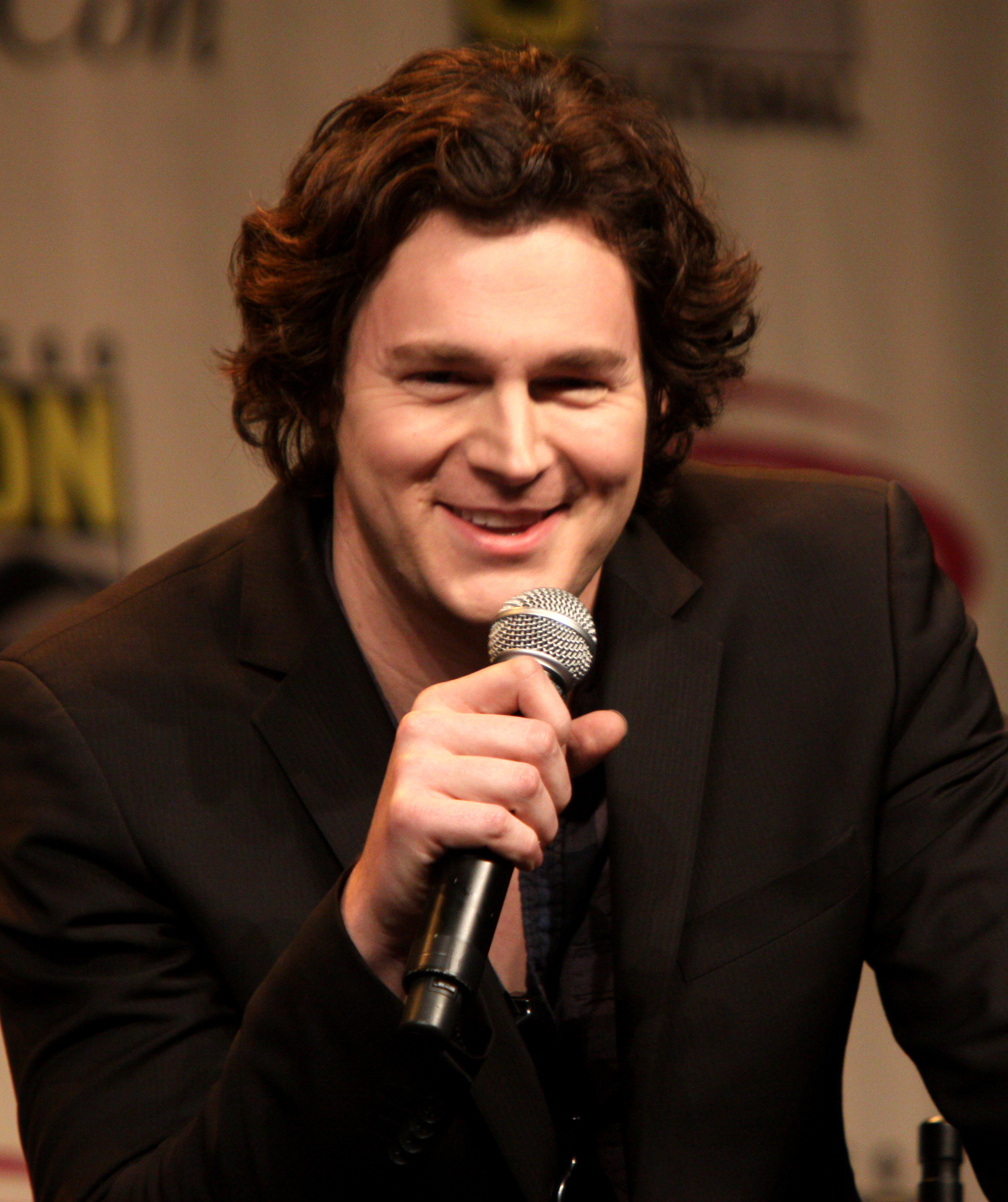
Walker in March 2012

=== Film ===
Year	Title	Role	Notes	Ref.
2004	Kinsey	Kinsey, aged 19		
2005	The Notorious Bettie Page	Jim		
2006	My Favorite Fairy Tales: Volume 2	N/A	Voice	
2006	My Favorite Fairy Tales: Volume 4	N/A	Voice	
2006	Unconscious	John Stradlater		
2006	Flags of Our Fathers	Harlon Block		
2007	Wasted NYC	Billy	Short film	
2007	All Saints Day	Matthew	Short film	
2009	The War Boys	David		
2010	Coach	Andy		
2011	The Hot Potato	Danny		
2011	Wolfe with an E	Record Store Clerk		
2012	Abraham Lincoln: Vampire Hunter	Abraham Lincoln		
2015	In the Heart of the Sea	George Pollard, Jr.		
2016	The Choice	Travis Shaw		
2017	Shimmer Lake	Zeke Sikes		
2019	Love Is Blind	Farmer Smithson		
2021	The Ice Road	Tom Varnay		
2022	The King's Daughter	Yves De La Croix		
2024	September 5	Peter Jennings		

=== Television ===
Year	Title	Role	Notes	Ref.
2006	3 lbs	Nick Ross	Episode: "Heart Stopping"	
2010	Westward!	Jesse Boone	Television film	
2013	The Missionary	Roy	Television film	
2013	Muhammad Ali's Greatest Fight	Kevin Connolly	Television film	
2019	Traitors	Jimmy Derby	6 episodes	
2019	Jessica Jones	Erik Gelden	10 episodes	
2021	The Underground Railroad	Terrance Randall	2 episodes	
2022–present	The Lord of the Rings: The Rings of Power	Gil-galad Damrod (voice)	10 episodes	

=== Theater ===
Year	Title	Role	Venue	Notes	Ref.
2005	Lady Windermere's Fan	Cecil Graham	Williamstown Theatre Festival		
2006	Romeo and Juliet	Mercutio	Williamstown Theatre Festival		
2007	Inherit the Wind	Bertram Cates	Lyceum Theatre	Broadway	
2008	Les Liaisons Dangereuses	Le Chevalier D'Anceny	American Airlines Theatre	Broadway	
2008–2011	Bloody Bloody Andrew Jackson	Andrew Jackson	Kirk Douglas Theatre	Regional (world premiere)	
2008–2011	Bloody Bloody Andrew Jackson	Andrew Jackson	The Public Theater	Off-Broadway (concert staging)	
2008–2011	Bloody Bloody Andrew Jackson	Andrew Jackson	The Public Theater	Off-Broadway	
2008–2011	Bloody Bloody Andrew Jackson	Andrew Jackson	Bernard B. Jacobs Theatre	Broadway	
2012–13	Cat on a Hot Tin Roof	Brick	Richard Rodgers Theatre	Broadway	
2016	American Psycho	Patrick Bateman	Gerald Schoenfeld Theatre	Broadway	
2019	All My Sons	Chris Keller	American Airlines Theatre	Broadway	
2024	Opening Night	Maurice	Gielgud Theatre	West End	
