= Commander Kraken =

Supervillain

- Commander Kraken makes his first appearance battling Prince Namor, from Sub-Mariner #27

Publication information
- Publisher: Marvel Comics
- First appearance: Sub-Mariner #27 (July 1970)
- Created by: Roy Thomas and Sal Buscema

In-story information
- Team affiliations: Hydra

Commander Kraken is a fictional character appearing in American comic books published by Marvel Comics.

== Publication history ==
Commander Kraken first appeared in Sub-Mariner #27 (July 1970), and was created by Roy Thomas and Sal Buscema. The character was killed by the Scourge of the Underworld in Captain America #319 (July 1986).

== Fictional character biography ==
The revamped Commander Kraken battles Iron Man. From issue #93 of The Invincible Iron Man.

Commander Kraken is a self-styled modern-day pirate and enemy Namor the Sub-Mariner. After encountering The Cat, Kraken reappears with a heavily modified look, undergoing plastic surgery and acquiring a rocket-powered peg leg and an electrified sword.

In Daredevil #121, which takes place after the character's appearance in The Cat and before his revamped look and appearance in Iron Man, it is revealed that Commander Kraken is a member of Hydra and the head of its naval division.

Commander Kraken is invited to a meeting at the Bar With No Name to discuss counter-measures against the Scourge of the Underworld, only for the Scourge to kill him and those attending. Following his death, Commander Kraken makes minor appearances in The Incredible Hercules as a resident of the underworld and a member of Pluto's jury.

== Powers and abilities ==
Commander Kraken had a hook on his left hand that was capable of emitting an electrical shock, this was later replaced with a functional bionic hand. His left leg was also bionic, and allowed him to fly. His electro-sword was capable of firing electricity and could reflect force and energy attacks.

Commander Kraken originally used squid-shaped submarines called "Squid Ships" for his piratical conquests. When he revamped his look in 1976, his vehicle of choice was a Brigantine called "The Albatross". This old style pirate ship could transform into a golden, high-powered submarine.
