= Wundarr the Aquarian =

Publication information
- Publisher: Marvel Comics
- First appearance: (as Wundarr) Fear #17 (Oct. 1973) (as Aquarian) Marvel Two-in-One #58 (Dec. 1979)
- Created by: (Wundarr) Steve Gerber and Val Mayerik (The Aquarian) Mark Gruenwald and Ralph Macchio

In-story information
- Alter ego: Wundarr
- Species: Dakkamite
- Team affiliations: The Command; Initiative; Project Pegasus
- Notable aliases: Herald of the New Age
- Abilities: Superhuman strength Limited flight, and leaping Null energy field ("entropy field") that nullifies all forms of energy Energy projection Vast knowledge Transmitting knowledge through touch

Wundarr the Aquarian is a fictional character appearing in American comic books published by Marvel Comics. The character was created by Steve Gerber and Val Mayerik and first appeared in Adventure into Fear #17. A pastiche of Superman, Wundarr was created based on Gerber's "love of the Superman character and (...) desire to do a little parody/homage".

== Publication history ==
Wundarr first appeared in Adventure into Fear #17 (October 1973), written by Steve Gerber. Before long he became a frequent supporting character in Marvel Two-in-One. After Gerber's run on Marvel-Two-in-One, Wundarr mostly disappeared until the Project Pegasus saga (written by Mark Gruenwald and Ralph Macchio), in which he became "The Aquarian".

=== Relaunch candidate ===
In 2005, Marvel.com presented four characters to be relaunched. The Aquarian was one of these choices and took second place to Death's Head. Gerber asked his fans on the Howard the Duck Yahoo! Group to vote against a revival of the character, since he would have neither creative control nor receive financial compensation from such a relaunch.

=== Legal issues ===
When Wundarr's first appearance was published, DC Comics claimed that Gerber had plagiarised Superman. Prior to publication, editor Roy Thomas told Gerber that the character would need to be changed. Gerber did not comply, with Stan Lee considering firing him. DC agreed to let Marvel continue using the character if sufficient changes were made to distinguish him from Superman, including changing his costume from red and blue to white.

== Fictional character biography ==
=== Early years ===
On a distant planet called Dakkam, scientist Hektu believes that his world will be destroyed when their sun goes nova. He and his wife Soja launch their young son Wundarr into space to save him before being killed by the Internal Security Force. It is later revealed that Hektu's apocalyptic prediction was incorrect, and that he sent his son away for nothing.

In July 1951, Wundarr's ship enters Earth's gravity and is exposed to cosmic rays before crashing in a Florida swamp. An unnamed elderly couple observe the crash and consider investigating, but decide to ignore it. Wundarr remains in his ship for years, growing to physical maturity but retaining the mind of a child. Twenty years later, Man-Thing encounters the pod and frees Wundarr, who believes him to be his mother.

With his great leaping ability, Wundarr eventually reaches Hydro-Base, where Namor and Namorita are trying to rehabilitate the population of Hydro-Men. Namor believes that Wundarr is an invader and scares him off. Two Dakkam officials, Tuumar and Zeneg, believe that Wundarr may seek to avenge his father and send a Mortoid robot to assassinate him. Wundarr travels to New York City, where he, the Thing, and Namor work together to destroy the Mortroid. Reed Richards builds Wundarr a containment suit that enables his body to expel small amounts of energy so that his body does not overload.

=== The Aquarian ===
Wundarr is captured by the Project Pegasus leaders to test his abilities. During these tests, the project leaders decide to use his energy-dampening abilities to probe the Cosmic Cube, a device of great cosmic power. During the probing, the Cosmic Cube overloads Wundarr's mind and body, rendering him comatose. This overload of energy greatly boosts his abilities, both mental and physical, giving him an energy-dampening field. Being in communication with the Cube grants Wundarr great knowledge and a sense of purpose. He awakens from his coma, and is further transformed by the Cosmic Cube. In light of his new knowledge, he renames himself the Aquarian. His new power allows him to defeat the Nth Man. Since then, he roams the Earth, seeking to bring peace and enlightenment.

For a time, he leads the Water-Children, a philosophical cult dedicated to pacifism and awaiting the coming of the Celestial Messiah. During this time, he is attacked by fellow Dakkamite Quantum, but saved by the hero Quasar.

Aquarian serves as a psychic "nesting place" for the Cosmic Cube before it obtains sentience. Aquarian also aids Doctor Strange in preventing planet-wide disasters on Earth.

=== The Initiative ===
After joining the Initiative program, Wundarr joins Florida's team, the Command, with Jennifer Kale and Siege. This team is the first to encounter the Marvel Zombies, who have entered the Marvel Universe through the Nexus of Realities. Wundarr is then bitten by a zombified Deadpool and enters hibernation in an energy cocoon to recover. After recovering, he defends Florida during the Skrull invasion of Earth, and later attends the Thing's bachelor party.

== Powers and abilities ==
Wundarr possesses various superhuman abilities derived from his exposure to cosmic rays and solar radiation. Initially, Wundarr could absorb energy directly into his body, allowing him to redirect the energy as blasts or increase his physical strength (allowing him to lift up to 15 tons).

After the exposure to the energies of the Cosmic Cube, Wundarr gained a field around his body that nullifies nearly all forms of energy. The field can also disable gravity, allowing Wundarr to walk on air. The field naturally extends five feet from his body, but can be shrunken to five inches (127 mm), or expanded up to 500 feet (150 m).

The Cosmic Cube gave Wundarr an unimaginable knowledge which he calls "Everything and Nothing". He appears to have a strong grasp on the properties of life and death, as well as peace and discourse. He is sometimes shown transmitting this knowledge to other beings through touch.
