= Mind-Wave =

- Mind-Wave as seen in Daredevil #133

Publication information
- Publisher: Marvel Comics
- First appearance: Daredevil #133 (May 1976)
- Created by: Marv Wolfman; Bob Brown; Jim Mooney

In-story information
- Alter ego: Erik Gelden
- Species: Human
- Abilities: Psionic powers

Mind-Wave is a fictional character appearing in American comic books published by Marvel Comics. He is a supervillain who wields psionic powers that has fought Daredevil on occasion.

In 2019, Benjamin Walker portrayed Erik Gelden in the third season of the TV series Jessica Jones set in the Marvel Cinematic Universe.

== Publication history ==
Mind-Wave first appeared in Daredevil #133 (May 1976), and was created by Marv Wolfman, Bob Brown and Jim Mooney. The character subsequently appears in Captain America #319 (July 1986), in which he was killed by the Scourge of the Underworld. Mind-Wave's real name of Erik Gelden was revealed in Official Handbook of the Marvel Universe A to Z Hardcover Vol. 10 when he was listed under Scourge of the Underworld's entry.

== Fictional character biography ==
=== Erik Gelden ===
Erik Geldon, also known as Mind-Wave, is a megalomaniac criminal possessing mental abilities heightened by his own inventions. He robs banks in Europe and America until he is stopped by Daredevil and Uri Geller.

Mind-Wave's mental abilities fail to warn him about the Scourge of the Underworld, who kills him in the "Bar With No Name" massacre.

Mind-Wave is among the 18 victims of the Scourge who are resurrected by Hood as part of a squad assembled to eliminate the Punisher. Mirage disguises himself, Mind-Wave, and some of the other criminals as a team of Avengers trying to kill the Punisher. After the Punisher uncovers the ruse, he kills Mind-Wave.

=== Mindwave ===
A new Mind-Wave appears as a Superhuman Registration Act violator. He amuses the officers of a Las Vegas, Nevada police precinct by claiming he was there to officially protest the Registration Act, and clarifying that his codename was different from the man who was called "Mind Hyphen Wave". Mindwave uses his telekinetic powers to destroy the station and kill the police officers present before surrendering to the Thunderbolts.

Mindwave is escorted to a cell in Thunderbolts Mountain. When left alone, he begins a telepathic conversation with fellow prisoners Caprice, Bluestreak, and Mirage, during which he suggests that it would be fun to interfere with the surgery scheduled to be performed on Bullseye. However, Bullseye recovers and kills Mindwave and his allies.

== Powers and abilities ==
The first Mind-Wave utilized a helmet of his own design that boosted his natural mental powers. His helmet enabled him to communicate mentally with others wearing similar helmets or with other psychics. Mind-Wave also utilized the "Think Tank", a large, heavily armed vehicle controlled by his powers.

The second Mind-Wave who has his name spelled "Mindwave" was a powerful telekinetic with the ability to destroy structures and halt and redirect hails of bullets in mid-flight. He also had some measure of telepathic ability, which he used to converse with his fellow prisoners and combine his power with theirs.

== In other media ==
Erik Gelden appears in Jessica Jones, portrayed by Benjamin Walker. This version possesses empathic powers that allow him to detect evil. Gelden initially uses his powers to blackmail people who have secretly performed criminal acts. He is later approached by Detective Eddy Costa to use his powers to help the police.
