= Grappler (comics) =

Publication information
- Publisher: Marvel Comics
- First appearance: She-Hulk #18 (July 1981)
- Created by: David Anthony Kraft; Michael Vosburg

In-story information
- Alter ego: Unrevealed
- Species: Human
- Abilities: Computer analyzing the environment and providing information about the amount of leverage required to lever an object; Tensile battle rod firing steel coils; Trained hand-to-hand combat

Grappler is a character appearing in American comic books published by Marvel Comics. Created by writer David Anthony Kraft and artist Mike Vosburg, the character first appeared in Savage She-Hulk #18 (July 1981). The Grappler is a supervillain who possesses the ability to find the perfect spot to apply the precise amount of leverage needed to win any fight. He is a recurring antagonist of the superheroine Jennifer Walters / She-Hulk.

== Publication history ==
The Grappler debuted in Savage She-Hulk #18 (July 1981), created by David Anthony Kraft and Mike Vosburg. He subsequently appeared in the Captain America (1954) series.

== Fictional character biography ==
The Grappler became a master of leverage, both in a physical and financial sense, when advised to study leverage as a youth. His attempt to put leverage to criminal use by stealing an armored car filled with gold was halted by She-Hulk.

Later, the Grappler tries to steal courtroom files in order to gain blackmail material. He again confronts She-Hulk. In an attempt to escape, he almost kills her father. The She-Hulk creates a shockwave that stops and stuns him.

The Grappler is approached by the villain Firebrand to meet at the Bar With No Name to discuss the Scourge of the Underworld, a person who has been killing villains. The Grappler joins with several other villains at the facility. However, the bartender is the Scourge, who kills everyone inside.

== Powers and abilities ==
The Grappler possesses Olympic-level training in martial arts and wrestling. He carries a specially equipped battle staff, which he uses in conjunction with a computer pack that analyzes and relays the exact point and amount of leverage required to topple any object.
