= Songbird (character) =

- Songbird; Art by Marko Djurdjević

Publication information
- Publisher: Marvel Comics
- First appearance: Marvel Two-in-One #54 (August, 1979)
- Created by: Mark Gruenwald; Ralph Macchio; John Byrne

In-story information
- Alter ego: Melissa Joan Gold
- Species: Human mutate
- Team affiliations: Thunderbolts; Grapplers; Masters of Evil; Femizons; Avengers Idea Mechanics; Lethal Legion; Mighty Avengers; Unlimited Class Wrestling Federation
- Notable aliases: Screaming Mimi, Mimi Schwartz
- Abilities: Superhuman strength, speed, agility, stamina, durability, and reflexes; Sonic screams, waves, and burst projection; Ability to create "solid sound" constructs; Sound and vocal manipulation; Hypnotic song; Echolocation; Flight

Songbird (Melissa Gold), formerly known as Screaming Mimi, is a superhero appearing in American comic books published by Marvel Comics. Originally a supervillain, she possesses supersonic sound abilities that can cause a variety of effects.

== Publication history ==
The character first appeared with the name Screaming Mimi in Marvel Two-in-One #54 (August, 1979), and was created by Mark Gruenwald, Ralph Macchio, and John Byrne.

She made numerous appearances as a supervillain before taking on a new role as a superhero in the Thunderbolts series.

After some time away from the team, she returned as a regular character in Thunderbolts beginning with issue #144, and appeared as a supporting character when the title transitioned into Dark Avengers beginning with issue #175.

In June 2015, Songbird was announced as a team member in the relaunched New Avengers, part of the "All-New, All-Different Marvel" branding.

== Fictional character biography ==
Melissa Gold was a runaway from home and her alcoholic father while her mother was incarcerated. To survive while homeless, Melissa took on a hard edge for her personality, calling herself "Mimi". She was ultimately imprisoned, and while there she met cellmate and female wrestler Poundcakes, who invited Melissa to become a member of the all-female wrestling team Grapplers using the ring name "Screaming Mimi", joining with Titania and Letha.

The Grapplers as a team become known for both their colorful personalities as well as their antics ringside; however, the wrestling federation does not give the Grapplers an opportunity to earn as much money as their male counterparts. The group then turns to illegal mercenary work, taking on a mission for the company Roxxon.

Roxxon gives the Grapplers special paraphernalia that grants them superhuman abilities; Mimi is given an apparatus that converted her voice into high frequency sonics to perform various effects. After being thwarted by Quasar and Giant-Man, the Grapplers are convicted at trial and sent to Ryker's Island.

After Titania and Letha are murdered by the Scourge of the Underworld, Mimi is contacted by the criminal Helmut Zemo to join his version of the Masters of Evil. Later, she forms a romantic and criminal partnership with the similarly empowered Angar the Screamer. Angar is eventually mortally wounded by a gunshot during a robbery attempt and dies in Mimi's arms.

Zemo's accomplice, the Fixer, gives Mimi new powers via a voice-augmenting harness and high-tech implants in her neck based on technology from the villain Klaw. She then casts aside her old wrestling persona as Mimi and resumes using her birth name, Melissa. With a new costume and the codename "Songbird", Melissa joins the Thunderbolts, a new Masters of Evil group posing as superheroes to win the world's trust while secretly plotting world conquest under Zemo's direction. However, Melissa and most of the other Thunderbolts grow to like their heroic roles. Melissa in particular finds a purpose in superheroics that she had never experienced before and even begins a romance with Abner Jenkins, alias MACH-1. Ultimately, the Thunderbolts turn against Zemo, foiling his attempt at world domination and rescuing the Avengers in the process. Melissa continues to serve with the team, who operated as a team of outlaw superheroes.

After the "Siege" event and Osborn's subsequent downfall, Songbird is appointed by the government to supervise inmates at the Raft prison. She later resigns to rejoin the Thunderbolts, now led by Luke Cage. She intends to keep a close eye on Moonstone, whom Cage has offered a chance for freedom in exchange for her serving on the team. When Songbird objects to Moonstone's inclusion on the team due to her history of manipulation and deceit, Cage counters that Songbird herself used to be regarded the same way and that she should give Moonstone the same chances she was given by others.

== Powers and abilities ==
As Screaming Mimi, every note on the scale she screams induces a different effect upon those who hear it. Low C causes low-level anxiety and shortness of breath, D causes high-level anxiety and panic attacks, E causes dizziness and vertigo, F causes nausea and stomach cramping, G causes severe headaches and fatigue, A causes blindness, B causes euphoria and eventual stupor, and high C causes the listener to visually hallucinate.

As Songbird, Melissa uses a derivation of technology created by Klaw that converts sound into a malleable form of energy that has physical form and mass, termed "solid sound." She could initially create simple three-dimensional sound/mass constructions, though as she has gained experience in her new supersonic sound abilities, she has learned to create more complex forms. She shapes and animates these by mental command, and they only remain in existence for as long as she wills them to.

She can "fly" by generating solid sound "wings" attached to her body; initially, these were created as glider-style wings, stretching from wrists to feet, though more recently they are shown attached to her back.

== Reception ==
=== Critical reception ===
Devon Lord-Moncrief of CBR.com stated, "Once a lower tier villain, Songbird masqueraded as a hero in the Thunderbolts before having a real change of heart and becoming a true hero. Not every person with superpowers starts as a hero, even if they have a good heart. Such is the unfortunate case of Melissa Gold, the former D-list villain known as Screaming Mimi. After a roller coaster of a career as a powered individual, [Melissa] Gold has become a formidable force to be reckoned with, growing from petty criminal to redeemed hero."

=== Accolades ===
- In 2015, Entertainment Weekly ranked Songbird 22nd in their "Let's rank every Avenger ever" list.
- In 2020, Scary Mommy included Songbird in their "Looking For A Role Model? These 195+ Marvel Female Characters Are Truly Heroic" list.
- In 2021, Screen Rant ranked Songbird 2nd in their "Marvel Comics: The 10 Greatest Redemptions" list.
- In 2022, CBR.com ranked Songbird 3rd in their "10 Best Masters Of Evil Members" list.
- In 2022, Screen Rant included Songbird in their "10 Most Powerful Members Of The Thunderbolts" list.

== Other versions ==
=== JLA/Avengers ===
Screaming Mimi appears in JLA/Avengers as a brainwashed minion of Krona.

=== Avengers Forever ===
An alternate timeline version of Songbird who joined the Avengers appears in Avengers Forever.

=== Marvel Zombies ===
A zombified alternate universe version of Songbird from Earth-2149 appears in the one-shot Marvel Zombies: Dead Days.

=== Old Man Logan ===
An alternate universe version of Songbird from Earth-807128 appears in Old Man Hawkeye. This version is a former member of the Thunderbolts who quit the team after they killed the Avengers and became a nun at the Sanctuary of the Silent Sisterhood.

== In other media ==
=== Television ===
- Songbird appears in The Super Hero Squad Show, voiced by Julie Morrison. This version is a S.H.I.E.L.D. agent who works undercover as Screaming Mimi in the Lethal Legion.
- Songbird appears in Avengers Assemble, voiced by Jennifer Hale. She appears as Screaming Mimi of the Masters of Evil in the episodes "Adapting to Change" and "Under Siege" and as Songbird of the Thunderbolts in the group's self-titled episode and "Thunderbolts Revealed". Songbird later appears in the four-part episode "Civil War" as a member of the Mighty Avengers.
- Screaming Mimi appears in the Marvel Rising short "Battle of the Bands", voiced by Tara Strong. This version is the leader of the band "Screaming Mimi and the Thunderbolts".

=== Video games ===
- Songbird appears as a playable character and boss in Marvel: Ultimate Alliance 2, voiced by Susan Spano. Additionally, a version of her Screaming Mimi costume appears as an alternate skin.
- Songbird appears as a playable DLC character in Lego Marvel's Avengers via the "Thunderbolts" DLC pack.
- Songbird appears as a playable character in Marvel: Avengers Alliance.
- Songbird appears as a playable character in Marvel: Future Fight.
- Songbird appears as a playable character in Marvel Tsum Tsum.
- Songbird appears as a playable character in Lego Marvel Super Heroes 2.
