= List of New Avengers members =

The New Avengers is a team originally formed due to a mass breakout at the super villain prison, the Raft. The team then became a splinter group of Avengers that chose not to comply with federal superhuman registration, as opposed to the government-sanctioned team gathered in The Mighty Avengers, which itself was supplanted by a different government-sanctioned team in the series Dark Avengers. The team was reformed in June 2010 as part of the "Heroic Age" storyline.

== New Avengers (2005–2012) ==
=== Founders ===
Character	Real name	Joined in	Notes
Iron Man	Anthony Edward "Tony" Stark	New Avengers #3 (March 2005)	Pro-registration side leader. Founding member of the Mighty Avengers (Initiative team). Current member of the main Avengers team. Rejoins team in New Avengers vol. 3 #1
Captain America a.k.a. Nomad	Steven "Steve" Rogers	New Avengers #3 (March 2005)	Current leader of the main Avengers teams. Rogers still supervises the team.
Luke Cage a.k.a. Power Man	Carl Lucas (birth name); Lucas "Luke" Cage (legal name)	New Avengers #3 (March 2005)	Former leader of the New Avengers. Left the team in New Avengers vol. 2 #30.
Spider-Man	Peter Benjamin Parker	New Avengers #3 (March 2005)	Also a member of the main Avengers team and Future Foundation.
Wolverine	James "Logan" Howlett	New Avengers #6 (June 2005)	Former member. Maintains concurrent membership in the main Avengers, X-Men, and Uncanny Avengers.
Sentry	Robert "Bob" Reynolds	New Avengers #10 (October 2005)	Became a member of the Mighty Avengers (Initiative team) after the Civil War and the Dark Avengers during Dark Reign. Went rogue in Siege #3 before being killed in Siege #4.
Echo a.k.a. Ronin	Maya Lopez	New Avengers #11 (November 2005) (as Ronin)	Active as Ronin in New Avengers #11 (2005). Operating in Japan during Civil War; active as Echo in New Avengers #27 (2007).
Infiltrator (2005)
"Spider-Woman"	Veranke (posing as Jessica Drew)	New Avengers #3 (March 2005)	Joined the Mighty Avengers (Initiative team) in Mighty Avengers #7 (November 2007). Revealed in New Avengers #42 (August 2008) as a Skrull who infiltrated Earth prior to the formation of the original team. Killed by Norman Osborn in Secret Invasion #8 (January 2009).

=== Post-Civil War recruits (2007) ===
The Avengers team featured in the New Avengers comic book, created from the remaining anti-registration Secret Avengers during the Civil War, with Luke Cage, Spider-Man, Wolverine, Echo, and "Spider-Woman" continuing from the original New Avengers team.

Character	Real name	Joined in	Notes
Doctor Strange	Stephen Vincent Strange	New Avengers #27 (February 2007)	Left the team in New Avengers Annual #2. Rejoined in New Avengers vol. 2 #7.
Iron Fist	Daniel Thomas "Danny" Rand-Kai	New Avengers #27 (February 2007)	Left the team in New Avengers #48. Rejoined in New Avengers vol. 2 #1.
Ronin a.k.a. Hawkeye, Goliath	Clinton Francis "Clint" Barton	New Avengers #27 (February 2007)	Appears with New Avengers as Ronin in New Avengers #27. Joins team via flashback in New Avengers #30. Becomes new team leader in New Avengers #51. Relinquishes leadership to Luke Cage in New Avengers vol. 2 #1, Later re-assuming his Hawkeye identity.

=== Post-Secret Invasion recruits (2009) ===
Character	Real name	Joined in	Notes
Bucky Barnes a.k.a. Winter Soldier, Captain America	James Buchanan "Bucky" Barnes	New Avengers #48 (January 2009)	Formerly led the Thunderbolts
Mockingbird	Barbara "Bobbi" Morse	New Avengers #48 (January 2009)	Joined the New Avengers after return from several years of Skrull captivity. Former member.
Ms. Marvel a.k.a. Warbird, Captain Marvel	Carol Susan Jane Danvers	New Avengers #48 (January 2009)	Former member of the Mighty Avengers (Initiative team). Becomes Second-in-Command in New Avengers #51. Current member of the main Avengers team. Former member.
Spider-Woman	Jessica Merriam Drew	New Avengers #48 (January 2009)	Joined the New Avengers after return from several years of Skrull captivity. Joined Sunspot's New Avengers in Avengers (vol. 5) #39.
Power Woman a.k.a. Knightress	Jessica Campbell Jones	New Avengers Annual #3 (December 2009)	Joined after helping to rescue Clint Barton from Norman Osborn. Left the team in New Avengers (vol. 2) #24 due to concerns regarding her daughter's safety.

=== Heroic Age (2010) ===
New Avengers in the aftermath of the Siege.

Character	Real name	Joined in	Notes
Thing	Benjamin Jacob "Ben" Grimm	New Avengers vol. 2 #1 (August 2010)	Current member of the Fantastic Four.

=== Fear Itself (2011) ===
Character	Real name	Joined in	Notes
Daredevil	Matthew Michael "Matt" Murdock	New Avengers vol. 2 #16 (September 2011)	Joined during the Fear Itself event

== New Avengers (2013–2015) ==
The relaunched title features the Illuminati rather than the Avengers. For members see under Illuminati

== Time Runs Out (2015–2016) ==
Following an eight-month ellipsis, Sunspot assembles a new unit of New Avengers to help end the conflict between the Avengers and the Illuminati.

Character	Real name	Joined in	Notes
Sunspot	Roberto "Bobby" da Costa	Avengers (vol. 5) #39 (February 2015)	Former member of the X-Men, New Mutants, and Avengers.
Cannonball	Samuel Zachary "Sam" Guthrie	Avengers (vol. 5) #39 (February 2015)	Former member of the X-Men, New Mutants, and Avengers.
Black Widow	Natalia Alianovna "Natasha" Romanova	Avengers (vol. 5) #39 (February 2015)	Former member of the main Avengers team.
Smasher	Isabel "Izzy" Kane	Avengers (vol. 5) #39 (February 2015)	Maintains membership in both the New Avengers and the Shi'ar Imperial Guard.
Manifold	Eden Fesi	Avengers (vol. 5) #39 (February 2015)	Former member of the Secret Warriors and the main Avengers team.
Validator	Michaud	Avengers (vol. 5) #39 (February 2015)	Former member of Omega Flight.
Pod	Aikku Jokinen	Avengers (vol. 5) #39 (February 2015)	
Shang-Chi		Avengers (vol. 5) #39 (February 2015)	Former member of the Marvel Knights, Heroes for Hire, and the main Avengers team.

=== All-New All-Different Marvel (2015–2016) ===
After the All-New All-Different rebrand, Sunspot took control of A.I.M., and changed the name to Avengers Idea Mechanics. The team is established in a new volume of New Avengers written by Al Ewing.

Character	Real name	Joined in	Notes
Wiccan	William "Billy" Kaplan	New Avengers vol. 4 #1	Founding member of the Young Avengers, son of the Scarlet Witch, fiancé of Hulkling
Hulkling	Theodore "Teddy" Altman/Dorrek VIII	New Avengers vol. 4 #1	Founding member of the Young Avengers, son of Captain Marvel and Anelle, fiancé of Wiccan
Songbird	Melissa Joan Gold	New Avengers vol. 4 #1	Former member of the Thunderbolts
Squirrel Girl	Doreen Allene Green	New Avengers vol. 4 #1	Former member of the Great Lakes Avengers
White Tiger	Ava Ayala	New Avengers vol. 4 #1	Former member of the Mighty Avengers and Heroes for Hire
Power Man	Víctor Hernán Álvarez	New Avengers vol. 4 #1	Former member of the Mighty Avengers and Heroes for Hire.
Hawkeye	Clinton Francis "Clint" Barton	New Avengers vol. 4 #1	"Super-Secret Traitor" of the Team

== New Avengers (2025–present) ==
A new incarnation of the New Avengers, led by Black Widow, would be launched in June 2025 to combat the Killuminati, evil clones of the Illuminati. The comic was initially titled "New Thunderbolts", before being retitled to mirror the name change featured in the Marvel Cinematic Universe film Thunderbolts*.

Codename	Real name	Joined in	Notes
Winter Soldier	James Buchanan "Bucky" Barnes	New Avengers (vol. 5) #5	
Black Widow	Natalia Alianovna "Natasha" Romanova	New Avengers (vol. 5) #5	Leader
Wolverine	Laura Kinney	New Avengers (vol. 5) #5	Krakoan duplicate of the original.
Namor		New Avengers (vol. 5) #5	
Clea Strange		New Avengers (vol. 5) #5	
Carnage	Edward "Eddie" Brock	New Avengers (vol. 5) #5	New host of the Carnage symbiote.
