= Mirage (Marvel Comics) =

Marvel Comics fictional character

Mirage is the name of two fictional villains appearing in American comic books published by Marvel Comics.

== Publication history ==
Mirage first appeared in The Amazing Spider-Man #156 and was created by Len Wein and Ross Andru.

== Fictional character biography ==
=== Desmond Charne ===
Mirage

Publication information
- Publisher: Marvel Comics
- First appearance: The Amazing Spider-Man #156 (May 1976)
- Created by: Len Wein; Ross Andru

In-story information
- Alter ego: Desmond Charne
- Species: Human
- Team affiliations: Sinister Sixteen
- Notable aliases: Master of Illusion
- Abilities: Genius electrician, physicist and laser technologist Carries a handgun and tranquilizer gun Costume grants: Three dimensional holographic image projection

Desmond Charne is a former holography technician who wanted to be a supervillain. To that end, he uses holographic technology which could make him invisible or create 3-D illusions. He also became the leader of his own criminal gang at some point.

Mirage attends the "Bar With No Name" in Medina County, Ohio and is killed by the Scourge of the Underworld along with all the other villains present. Captain America poses as Mirage to capture the Scourge, who is shot to death by another mysterious assailant.

During the "Dark Reign" storyline, Mirage is among the 18 victims of the Scourge who are resurrected by the Hood as part of a squad assembled to eliminate the Punisher. The Punisher attacks Mirage and threatens him to get him to tell him everything he knows about Microchip's whereabouts, but Mirage is shot by an unidentified assassin before he can give Punisher information.

Mirage resurfaces at a Super Villains Anonymous meeting, where he elaborates on his origin, and reveals that he had fallen into a coma for three months after being shot. Mirage is then hired as a member of Boomerang and Owl's Sinister Sixteen, a team assembled to distract Chameleon's forces while Boomerang steals from him. During the battle between the group and Chameleon's men, Mirage is knocked out and impersonated by Chameleon, who is in turn knocked out by Boomerang when he sees through the ruse. Believing Mirage to be an illusion, Boomerang shoves him off a building, killing him.

During the "Dead No More: The Clone Conspiracy" storyline, Mirage is resurrected in a clone body by Jackal and his company New U Technologies. Mirage later dies from clone degeneration.

During the "Damnation" storyline, Mirage is revived when Doctor Strange uses his magic to restore Las Vegas.

=== Unnamed ===
A new, female incarnation of Mirage appears as a violator of the Superhuman Registration Act. After Mindwave is captured by the Thunderbolts, he telepathically contacts Mirage, who informs him that Doc Samson, who was present in Thunderbolts Mountain, had some fascinating thoughts.

Mirage is ordered not to focus on Samson, but she ignores her fellow prisoners to pry into his mind regardless. When Samson notices Mirage's probing, he sends psychic feedback that stuns her and breaks the connection. Bullseye later kills Mirage and her allies in their cells by throwing scalpels into their heads.

== Powers and abilities ==
Desmond Charne is an electronics and laser technology genius, holding a master's degree in physics. He designed a costume of synthetic stretch fabric lined with micro-circuitry and miniature devices with which he can project three-dimensional laser-induced images called holograms. These holographic projectors, located in the costume's cowl, enabled him to disguise himself as others, or to project multiple images, or to project three-dimensional images of himself several yards from his actual location while rendering himself "invisible" by bending light rays appropriately. He also often carries a handgun with a silencer, and a tranquilizer gun.

The second Mirage has telepathic abilities.

== Other versions ==
The Desmond Charne incarnation of Mirage appears in Spider-Man Loves Mary Jane.
