= Ardina =

Publication information
- Publisher: Marvel Comics
- First appearance: The Order #4 (July 2002)
- Created by: Jo Duffy, Kurt Busiek, and Dan Jurgens

Ardina is a character appearing in American comic books published by Marvel Comics.

== Fictional character biography ==
The Defenders were told by Papa Hagg that they needed female analogs to counter The Order, and they found analogs of all the Order except for the Silver Surfer. Papa Hagg gave them a magic dagger to siphon off some of the Silver Surfer's energy and create a female by using a spell invoking Umar, Hecate, Demeter, Jord, and Apalla. Once Ardina was created, she and the rest of the Defenders were banished to a far off place. The Defenders were rescued from this strange place by Dr. Christopher Ganyrog and Romantic Objective Pamela. The Defenders then learned that they were on the planet Yann and that Yandroth was manipulating the Order. When many of the Earth's heroes attacked the Order, the Defenders and warriors of Yann helped the heroes. Yandroth's manipulations were revealed and the Order broke away from his influence and defeated him. The people of Yann took Yandroth back to their world and Papa Hagg invited Ardina and the female Defenders to an island spa two dimensions over and they accepted.

After the superhero Civil War, Tony Stark considered Ardina as a potential Initiative recruit.

== Powers and abilities ==
Ardina is made from the energies of the Silver Surfer, and can use the Power Cosmic to create energy blasts from her hands and fly.
