= Scourge of the Underworld =

Fictional comic book characters

- The Scourge as depicted in Official Handbook of the Marvel Universe.

Publication information
- Publisher: Marvel Comics
- First appearance: Iron Man #194 (May 1985)
- Created by: Mark Gruenwald (writer); John Byrne (artist)

In-story information
- Alter ego: Various
- Abilities: Master of disguise Exploding armor-piercing bullets

The Scourge of the Underworld is the name of a series of fictional characters appearing in American comic books published by Marvel Comics.

Writer/editor Mark Gruenwald originally created the Scourge in 1985 as a plot device intended to thin the criminal population of the Marvel Universe, in particular eliminating those supervillain characters he deemed to be too minor, redundant, or ill-conceived. Numerous other characters have used the name, often with differing motives and loyalties.

== Fictional character biography ==
The Scourge is originally depicted as an individual vigilante dedicated to the assassination of criminals. This person, whose true name has never been revealed, is seen over the course of several months murdering known supervillains. The Scourge approaches a supervillain in disguise, shoots him or her with an explosive-tipped bullet, then disappears. This first iteration's killing spree reaches its apex in Captain America #319, where he kills eighteen criminals at an underworld meeting held to devise a way of countering the menace of the Scourge.

When Captain America captures the Scourge, he claims to be the brother of the Enforcer, whom Scourge killed because his criminal activities shamed their father. He claims that this crime led to him creating the Scourge persona with help from a private investigator only identified as Domino, who provides him detailed information on supervillains. Immediately after making this confession, the Scourge is murdered by an unseen assailant.

Following this story, several imposter Scourges are introduced. The Scourge's creator, Mark Gruenwald, explained that while he wanted to resolve the mystery of the Scourge sooner rather than later, he feared that if he brought the Scourge back too soon he would run out of low-tier villains for him to kill and would have to either start killing off mid-tier villains or create new villains for the sole purpose of being victims of the Scourge.

In 1993, Gruenwald wrote a four-part U.S. Agent miniseries to resolve the mysteries involving the Scourge of the Underworld. The series revealed that the various Scourges belong to an organization that Thomas Halloway established following his retirement.

Various characters have assumed the Scourge mantle since the original's death, including Frank Simpson, Paladin, and a brainwashed Jack Monroe and Dennis Dunphy.

== Villains killed by the Scourge ==
Name	First appearance	Last appearance
Enforcer	Ghost Rider #22 (February 1977)	Iron Man #194 (May 1985)
Miracle Man	Fantastic Four #3 (March 1962)	Thing #24 (June 1985)
Hate-Monger	Fantastic Four #279 (June 1985)	Secret Wars II #2 (August 1985)
Megatak	Thor #328 (February 1983)	Thor #358 (August 1985)
Melter	Tales of Suspense #47 (November 1963)	Avengers #263 (January 1986)
Titania	Marvel Two-in-One #54 (August 1979)	Thing #33 (March 1986)
Basilisk	Marvel Team-Up #16 (December 1973)	Fantastic Four #289 (April 1986)
Human Fly	The Amazing Spider-Man Annual #10 (January 1976)	The Amazing Spider-Man #276 (May 1986)
Death Adder	Marvel Two-in-One #64 (June 1980)	Captain America #318 (June 1986)
Blue Streak	Captain America #217 (January 1978)	Captain America #318 (June 1986)
Wraith (Brian DeWolff)	Marvel Team-Up #48 (August 1976)	The Amazing Spider-Man #278 (July 1986)
Jaguar	Daredevil #120 (April 1975)	Captain America #319 (July 1986)
Mirage	The Amazing Spider-Man #156 (May 1976)	Captain America #319 (July 1986)
Hellrazor	Marvel Team-Up #87 (November 1979)	Captain America #319 (July 1986)
Shellshock	Fantastic Four Annual #5 (November 1967)	Captain America #319 (July 1986)
Bird-Man	Daredevil #157	Captain America #319 (July 1986)
Cyclone	The Amazing Spider-Man #143 (April 1975)	Captain America #319 (July 1986)
Ringer	Defenders #51 (September 1977)	Captain America #319 (July 1986)
Turner D. Century	Spider-Woman #33 (December 1980)	Captain America #319 (July 1986)
Grappler	She-Hulk #18 (July 1981)	Captain America #319 (July 1986)
Cheetah	Captain Marvel #48 (January 1977)	Captain America #319 (July 1986)
Vamp	Captain America #217 (January 1978)	Captain America #319 (July 1986)
Commander Kraken	Sub-Mariner #27 (July 1970)	Captain America #319 (July 1986)
Letha	Marvel Two-in-One #54 (August 1979)	Captain America #319 (July 1986)
Steeplejack	Ms. Marvel #14 (February 1978)	Captain America #319 (July 1986)
Mind-Wave	Daredevil #133 (May 1976)	Captain America #319 (July 1986)
Rapier	The Spectacular Spider-Man Annual #2 (August 1980)	Captain America #319 (July 1986)
Firebrand	Iron Man #27 (July 1970)	Captain America #319 (July 1986)
Hijacker	Tales to Astonish #40 (February 1963)	Captain America #319 (July 1986)
Hammer and Anvil	Incredible Hulk #182 (December 1974)	Marvel Fanfare #29 (November 1986)
Red Skull (Albert Malik)	Captain America Comics #61 (March 1947)	Captain America #347 (November 1988)
An unnamed member of the Watchdogs	Captain America #351 (March 1989)	Captain America #351 (March 1989)
Black Abbott	Marvel Team-Up #147 (November 1984)	Captain America #394 (November 1991)
Wrench (Kurt Klemmer)	Omega the Unknown #6 (January 1977)	Captain America #394 (November 1991)
Blowtorch Brand	Defenders #135 (September 1984)	U.S. Agent #2 (May 1993)
