= The Order (comics) =

Group of fictional characters

The Order is the name of two superhero teams appearing in American comic books published by Marvel Comics. The first team was a brief offshoot of the team Defenders, and the second is part of an initiative to place a superhero team in each state of the United States.

== Publication history ==
=== Defenders offshoot ===
The original incarnation of The Order starred in the six-issue limited series The Order (April–Sept. 2002) intending to conquer the world to protect it. The team consisted of the original Defenders: Doctor Strange, Hulk, Namor the Sub-Mariner and Silver Surfer.

=== Initiative version ===
A second Marvel Comics superhero team called The Order debuted in The Order vol. 2, No. 1 (Sept. 2007), created by writer Matt Fraction and penciler Barry Kitson. Following the fallout of Marvel Comics' "Civil War" crossover event, The Order was dubbed the First Super Hero Team of Tomorrow, being the official superhero team for California as part of the Fifty States Initiative. The group was originally intended to be named the Champions, but was changed as the "Champions" trademark was then owned by Heroic Publishing. The group was first seen during the end of the "Civil War," with many of its members going unnamed during their first appearances. Most of them, however, would be a part of the new series, though the designs of the characters were slightly altered.

As the cast of The Order is composed almost entirely of new characters, Fraction looked to a popular television drama for ideas on how to acquaint readers with his protagonists: "I kind of went with the same kind of format they use on Lost. Each issue, I wanted readers to spend a little time with one character more than any other."

Fraction framed each issue around a flashback sequence depicting an interview with each character explaining their past and why they joined the Order to give each character a detailed introduction.

In late January 2008, Fraction revealed on Newsarama's podcast "Word Balloon" that The Order would end at issue 10. Though at first it was believed that Marvel had canceled the series, Fraction later stated on a later Newsarama interview that:

...the book wasn't canceled: I chose to end it. Marvel allowed me to choose to leave the stage, rather than to continue on in a state in which I felt was compromised and decidedly unawesome. I don't think I was too clear about that on Word Balloon: it wasn't canceled. I killed it. And if you're looking for the man that killed The Order, it was me.

Though the series was ended several of the book's characters and storylines would continue on in Matt Fraction's next project, The Invincible Iron Man. The group also appeared in the 2008 Eternals series and Avengers: The Initiative.

== Fictional team history ==
=== Defenders offshoot ===
The original incarnation of The Order starred in the six-issue limited series The Order (April–Sept. 2002) intending to conquer the world to protect it. The team consisted of the original Defenders: Doctor Strange, Hulk, Namor the Sub-Mariner and Silver Surfer.

Their fellow Defenders Hellcat, Nighthawk, Valkyrie and Clea team up with other heroes (including Ardina, a cosmic-powered woman they mystically create from a portion of the Silver Surfer's energy) to oppose the Order and return them to their senses, just in time to prevent the curse from rendering Yandroth omnipotent.

=== Initiative version ===
The Order
- Cover art for The Order vol. 2, No. 1 (Sept. 2007) with, clockwise from top left, Aralune, Supernaut, Anthem, Mulholland, Veda and Calamity. Art by Barry Kitson.

Publication information
- Publisher: Marvel Comics
- Schedule: Concluded
- Format: Monthly
- Main character(s): Anthem; Aralune; Calamity; Heavy; Mulholland; Supernaut; Veda; See Members section

Creative team
- Created by: Matt Fraction; Barry Kitson
- Written by: Matt Fraction
- Penciller: Barry Kitson

The second Order is largely made up of celebrities known for making a difference through charitable work. The group's members are given a viral genomech payload developed by Hank Pym, giving them superpowers. However, this process causes great strain on human bodies allowing the users limited time as a superhuman (roughly a year).

As the Californian Initiative team, the Order face and defeat Infernal Man. After the battle, some members fail to follow the morals clause in their contract by going out drinking, and are subsequently fired and have their powers removed.

The team is evicted from its Bradbury, California headquarters. Their enemy, the M.A.N. from S.H.A.D.O.W., is revealed to be a collection of General Softly androids devised by the Super Human Development and Operation (S.H.D.O.). After Zeke Stane reactivates Mulholland Black's powers to the point they went out of control and remove the powers of the rest of the Order, Henry Hellrung is forced to kill Black. With the villains defeated, Tony Stark offers to restore the powers of the Order's surviving members and make the team into a military operation rather than a public relations showcase.

== Members ==
=== Defenders offshoot ===
- Doctor Strange
- Hulk
- Namor
- Silver Surfer

=== Initiative version ===
==== Members ====
- Anthem – Henry Hellrung is the team's field leader. He is able to stimulate and separate positive and negative charges in the air, allowing him to generate electricity. Hellrung was previously an actor who played Tony Stark on a TV series before becoming friends with Stark himself. After falling into alcoholism, Hellrung joins Alcoholics Anonymous, where he supports Stark's own recovery efforts.
- Aralune – Rebecca "Becky" Ryan is a former pop star who faced various troubles in her successful career, including bulimia and a sex tape scandal, which were covered up by Kate Kildare. Ryan is a dedicated, hard-worker, but also as a people pleaser to her own detriment. Her powers are designed so she "can be whatever she wants", giving her shapeshifting abilities.
- Calamity – James Wa was an aspiring athlete known for his raw speed. After losing his legs in a car accident, Wa became an engineer and designed prosthetic limbs for himself. His prosthetics, in combination with his powers, allow him to move at superhuman speeds.
- Supernaut – Milo Fields is a former sergeant and soldier who, along with his platoon, was held hostage for eleven days while serving in the Somali Civil War. Four of his men were killed, with the rest being abandoned and later found by police officers. A greatly exaggerated version of Fields' capture and rescue was adapted into a film. Fields, opposed to the film's portrayal of him, became active in the anti-war movement until he was shot in the spine by someone who thought Fields was being unpatriotic, leaving him paraplegic. Fields utilizes an Omega-class mechanized battle-suit, Supernaut, that is mentally connected to him. Using Aralune's blood, Fields regained the ability to walk.
- Veda – Magdalena "Maggie" Marie Neuntauben is an actress known for her martial arts background and work with orphans. She has the power to summon humanoid golem soldiers out of organic materials that surround her using multisight to see through their eyes. However, she feels pain anytime one is destroyed.

==== Associates ====
- Tony Stark – Director of S.H.I.E.L.D., and founder of the team.
- Kate Kildare – Kildare is the team's public relations agent and responsible for maintaining The Order's reputation in the public eye. Kildare used to date Hellrung during his days as an actor but split up with him when he became an alcoholic, though he eventually returned to her asking for her services to rebuild his career.

==== Former members ====
- Aphrodite – A former supermodel.
- Avona – Avery Allen is a gifted swordswoman, Allen was given a sword with an integrated artificial intelligence called "Bluetooth" with which Allen had a psychic link. She was fired from the Order and later murdered.
- Bannerman Brown and Bannerman Green – Two Stark Enterprises androids. They were later destroyed by Infernal Man.
- Mulholland Black - Mulholland Black is the orphaned mutant daughter of two grunge musicians. Black's mutant powers give her a psychic connection to Los Angeles, allowing her to channel psychokinetic energy for a variety of effects. After M-Day, Black lost her powers. As part of The Order, Black was given a replica of her mutant powers and opted not to use a codename. Black also wields a power mallet, charged by her psychokinetic energy, which grants her flight. The Black Dahlias later inject Black with Stark's S.P.I.N. Tech to remove her powers, which cause her original mutant powers to resurface. Anthem is forced to kill Mulholland to save the city.
- Corona – Real name Carlos Araújo Carvalho, Corona is a living conduit of the Sun whose powers are channeled through an exo-suit. Corona was fired from the Order and later murdered.
- Heavy – Sergeant Major Dennis Michael Murray was a warrant officer who was injured during Tony Stark's visit to the front lines, leaving him paralyzed. As part of the Order, Black is contained in a special suit containing a colloid fluid that keeps him alive, giving him superhuman strength and the capability of flight. Black is killed after his powers were removed by Zeke Stane.
- Hercules – He had superhuman strength and the ability to fly. His fate is unknown.
- Maul – Real name Jamal Peoples, Maul uses an energy mallet, which provided flight and an energy covering his entire body as well as the ability to reduce any problem down to its component parts. After being fired from the Order, Peoples is hired by Zeke Stane.
- Pierce – Pamela Pierce is an archer who won an Archery Gold medal in Sydney. As part of the Order, she was given enhanced agility and used a bow with titanium tipped arrows.
- Pepper Potts – The logistical coordinator of the Order, Potts uses external technology to tap into Stark technology, including satellites.
