= Marvel Two-in-One =

Comic book series

- Marvel Two-In-One Annual #2 (Dec. 1977). Art by Jim Starlin.

Publication information
- Publisher: Marvel Comics
- Schedule: Monthly
- Format: Ongoing
- Publication date: (vol. 1); January 1974 – June 1983 (vol. 2); February 2018 – January 2019
- No. of issues: (vol. 1): 100, plus seven Annuals (vol. 2): 12, plus one Annual
- Main character: Thing

Creative team
- Written by: List: (vol. 1): Chris Claremont, Tom DeFalco, Steve Gerber, Mark Gruenwald, David Anthony Kraft, Ralph Macchio, Bill Mantlo, David Michelinie, Roger Slifer, Roy Thomas, Marv Wolfman (vol. 2): Chip Zdarsky
- Penciller: List: (vol. 1): Sal Buscema, John Byrne, Gil Kane, Alan Kupperberg, Frank Miller, Michael Netzer George Pérez, Jim Starlin, Ron Wilson (vol. 2): Jim Cheung, Ramon K. Perez, Valerio Schiti, Declan Shalvey
- Inker: List: (vol. 1): Gene Day, Mike Esposito, Frank Giacoia, Pablo Marcos, Joe Sinnott, Chic Stone (vol. 2): Jim Cheung, John Dell, Ramon K. Perez, Valerio Schiti, Declan Shalvey, Walden Wong

Marvel Two-in-One is an American comic book series published by Marvel Comics featuring Fantastic Four member the Thing in a different team-up each issue.

== Publication history ==
=== Original series ===
The concept of teaming the Thing with a different character in each issue was given a test run in Marvel Feature #11-12 and proved a success. Marvel Two-in-One continued from the team-up stories in the final two issues of Marvel Feature and lasted for 100 issues from January 1974 through June 1983. Seven Annuals were also published. Artist Ron Wilson began his long association with the title with issue #12 (November 1975) and worked on it throughout its run. With issue #17, the series had a crossover with Marvel Team-Up #47, which featured Spider-Man. The second Marvel Two-in-One Annual was a crossover with Avengers Annual #7, both of which were written and drawn by Jim Starlin. The "Project Pegasus" storyline in Marvel Two-in-One #53-58 saw the introduction of the name "Quasar" for the Wendell Vaughn character and the transformation of Wundarr into the Aquarian.

Due to a binding error, three copies of issue 74 were released with the cover of DC's The New Teen Titans issue #6 in April 1981.

Comics creators who contributed to the series include Steve Gerber, Jack Kirby (who did pencils on several covers during its run), Marv Wolfman, John Buscema, John Byrne, Frank Miller, and George Pérez.

Marvel Two-In-One ended after 100 issues and seven Annuals. It was immediately replaced by a Thing solo series.

=== Revival ===
As part of Marvel Legacy, a soft relaunch of the Marvel Universe, Marvel Two-In-One (stylized as Marvel 2-in-One) was revived in December 2017 with a new story titled "The Fate of the Four" that revolves around the Thing and the Human Torch going on a road trip to investigate the disappearance of Reed Richards, Sue Storm, Franklin, and Valeria Richards. The series was written by Chip Zdarsky and ran for 12 issues and one Annual. The series was penciled by Jim Cheung (issues #1, 2, and 6), Valerio Schiti (issues #3–5), Ramon K. Perez (issues #7–12), and Declan Shalvey (Annual #1).

== Issues ==
Issue	Character(s)	Marvel Essentials	Marvel Masterworks	Epic Collection	Omnibus	Other Collections
#1	Man-Thing	Vol. 1	Vol. 1	Vol. 1: Cry Monster	Vol. 1	Man-Thing by Steve Gerber Vol. 1
#2	Sub-Mariner	Vol. 1	Vol. 1	Vol. 1: Cry Monster	Vol. 1	
#3	Daredevil	Vol. 1	Vol. 1	Vol. 1: Cry Monster	Vol. 1	Marvel Masterworks: Daredevil Vol. 11; Marvel Masterworks: Ka-Zar Vol. 2; Daredevil Epic Collection Vol. 6; Women of Marvel: Celebrating Seven Decades Omnibus
#4	Captain America	Vol. 1	Vol. 1	Vol. 1: Cry Monster	Vol. 1	Guardians of the Galaxy Epic Collection Vol. 1; Guardians of the Galaxy: Tomorrow's Heroes Omnibus
#5	Guardians of the Galaxy	Vol. 1	Vol. 1	Vol. 1: Cry Monster	Vol. 1	Guardians of the Galaxy Epic Collection Vol. 1; Guardians of the Galaxy: Tomorrow's Heroes Omnibus
#6	Doctor Strange	Vol. 1	Vol. 1	Vol. 1: Cry Monster	Vol. 1	Marvel Masterworks: The Defenders Vol. 3; Defenders Epic Collection Vol. 2; Defenders Omnibus Vol. 1
#7	Valkyrie	Vol. 1	Vol. 1	Vol. 1: Cry Monster	Vol. 1	Marvel Masterworks: The Defenders Vol. 3; Defenders Epic Collection Vol. 2; Defenders Omnibus Vol. 1
#8	Ghost Rider	Vol. 1	Vol. 1	Vol. 1: Cry Monster	Vol. 1	Marvel Masterworks: Ghost Rider Vol. 2
#9	Thor	Vol. 1	Vol. 1	Vol. 1: Cry Monster	Vol. 1	
#10	Black Widow	Vol. 1	Vol. 1	Vol. 1: Cry Monster	Vol. 1	
#11	Golem	Vol. 1	Vol. 2	Vol. 1: Cry Monster	Vol. 1	Marvel Horror Omnibus
#12	Iron Man	Vol. 1	Vol. 2	Vol. 1: Cry Monster	Vol. 1	
#13	Power Man	Vol. 1	Vol. 2	Vol. 1: Cry Monster	Vol. 1	
#14	Son of Satan	Vol. 1	Vol. 2	Vol. 1: Cry Monster	Vol. 1	The Son of Satan Classic
#15	Morbius, the Living Vampire	Vol. 1	Vol. 2	Vol. 1: Cry Monster	Vol. 1	Morbius Epic Collection Vol. 2; Morbius Omnibus Vol. 1
#16	Ka-Zar	Vol. 1	Vol. 2	Vol. 1: Cry Monster	Vol. 1	
#17	Spider-Man	Vol. 1	Vol. 2	Vol. 1: Cry Monster	Vol. 1	Marvel Masterworks: Marvel Team-Up Vol. 5; Marvel Team-Up Omnibus Vol. 2
#18	Scarecrow	Vol. 1	Vol. 2	Vol. 1: Cry Monster	Vol. 1	Marvel Horror Omnibus; Ghost Rider Epic Collection Vol. 2
#19	Tigra	Vol. 1	Vol. 2	Vol. 1: Cry Monster	Vol. 1	Tigra Complete Collection
#20	The Liberty Legion	Vol. 1	Vol. 2	Vol 2: Two Against Hydra	Vol. 1	Thing: Liberty Legion; Marvel Masterworks: The Fantastic Four Vol. 16
#21	Doc Savage	Not Collected	Vol. 3	Not Collected	Not Collected	
#22	Thor	Vol. 1	Vol. 3	Vol. 2: Two Against Hydra	Vol. 1	
#23	Thor	Vol. 1	Vol. 3	Vol. 2: Two Against Hydra	Vol. 1	
#24	Black Goliath	Vol. 1	Vol. 3	Vol. 2: Two Against Hydra	Vol. 1	
#25	Iron Fist	Vol. 1	Vol. 3	Vol. 2: Two Against Hydra	Vol. 1	
#26	Nick Fury	Vol. 2	Vol. 3	Vol. 2: Two Against Hydra	Vol. 1	
#27	Deathlok	Vol. 2	Vol. 3	Vol. 2: Two Against Hydra	Vol. 1	Marvel Masterworks: Deathlok Vol. 1; Deathlok the Demolisher
#28	Sub-Mariner	Vol. 2	Vol. 3	Vol. 2: Two Against Hydra	Vol. 1	
#29	Shang-Chi	Vol. 2	Vol. 3	Vol. 2: Two Against Hydra	Vol. 1	Marvel Masterworks: Spider-Woman Vol. 1; Spider-Woman Omnibus
#30	Spider-Woman	Vol. 2	Vol. 3	Vol. 2: Two Against Hydra	Vol. 1	Marvel Masterworks: Spider-Woman Vol. 1; Spider-Woman Omnibus
#31	Mystery Menace	Vol. 2	Vol. 3	Vol. 2: Two Against Hydra	Vol. 1	Marvel Masterworks: Spider-Woman Vol. 1; Spider-Woman Omnibus
#32	Invisible Girl	Vol. 2	Vol. 3	Vol. 2: Two Against Hydra	Vol. 1	Marvel Masterworks: Spider-Woman Vol. 1; Spider-Woman Omnibus
#33	Modred the Mystic	Vol. 2	Vol. 3	Vol. 2: Two Against Hydra	Vol. 1	Marvel Masterworks: Spider-Woman Vol. 1; Spider-Woman Omnibus
#34	Nighthawk	Vol. 2	Vol. 3	Vol. 2: Two Against Hydra	Vol. 1	
#35	Skull the Slayer	Vol. 2	Vol. 3	Vol. 2: Two Against Hydra	Vol. 1	
#36	Mister Fantastic	Vol. 2	Vol. 3	Vol. 2: Two Against Hydra	Vol. 1	
#37	Matt Murdock	Vol. 2	Vol. 4	Vol. 3: Remembrance of Things Past		
#38	Daredevil	Vol. 2	Vol. 4	Vol. 3: Remembrance of Things Past		
#39	Vision	Vol. 2	Vol. 4	Vol. 3: Remembrance of Things Past		
#40	Black Panther	Vol. 2	Vol. 4	Vol. 3: Remembrance of Things Past		
#41	Brother Voodoo	Vol. 2	Vol. 4	Vol. 3: Remembrance of Things Past		Marvel Masterworks: Brother Voodoo Vol. 1; Marvel Horror Omnibus
#42	Captain America	Vol. 2	Vol. 4	Vol. 3: Remembrance of Things Past		Thing: Project Pegasus
#43	Man-Thing	Vol. 2	Vol. 4	Vol. 3: Remembrance of Things Past		Thing: Project Pegasus; Man-Thing Omnibus Vol. 1; Marvel Universe by John Byrne Omnibus Vol. 2
#44	Hercules	Vol. 2	Vol. 4	Vol. 3: Remembrance of Things Past		
#45	Captain Marvel	Vol. 2	Vol. 4	Vol. 3: Remembrance of Things Past		
#46	Hulk	Vol. 2	Vol. 4	Vol. 3: Remembrance of Things Past		
#47	Yancy Street Gang	Vol. 2	Vol. 5	Vol. 3: Remembrance of Things Past		
#48	Jack of Hearts	Vol. 2	Vol. 5	Vol. 3: Remembrance of Things Past		
#49	Doctor Strange	Vol. 2	Vol. 5	Vol. 3: Remembrance of Things Past		
#50	The Thing (alternate universe)	Vol. 2	Vol. 5	Vol. 3: Remembrance of Things Past		Fantastic Four by John Byrne Omnibus Vol. 1; Marvel Universe by John Byrne Omnibus Vol. 2
#51	Beast, Ms. Marvel, Nick Fury, Wonder Man	Vol. 2	Vol. 5	Vol. 3: Remembrance of Things Past		Ms. Marvel Epic Collection Vol 2, Captain Marvel: Ms. Marvel – A Hero Is Born Omnibus; Marvel Universe by Frank Miller Omnibus
#52	Moon Knight	Vol. 2	Vol. 5	Vol. 3: Remembrance of Things Past		Moon Knight Epic Collection Vol. 1; Moon Knight Omnibus Vol. 1
#53	Quasar	Vol. 3	Vol. 5	Vol. 4: Project Pegasus		Thing: Project Pegasus; Marvel Universe by John Byrne Omnibus Vol. 2
#54	Deathlok	Vol. 3	Vol. 5	Vol. 4: Project Pegasus		Marvel Masterworks: Deathlok Vol. 1; Thing: Project Pegasus; Marvel Universe by John Byrne Omnibus Vol. 2
#55	Giant-Man	Vol. 3	Vol. 5	Vol. 4: Project Pegasus		Thing: Project Pegasus; Marvel Universe by John Byrne Omnibus Vol. 2
#56	Thundra	Vol. 3	Vol. 5	Vol. 4: Project Pegasus		Thing: Project Pegasus
#57	Wundarr	Vol. 3	Vol. 5	Vol. 4: Project Pegasus		Thing: Project Pegasus
#58	Aquarian	Vol. 3	Vol. 5	Vol. 4: Project Pegasus		Thing: Project Pegasus
#59	The Human Torch	Vol. 3	Vol. 5	Vol. 4: Project Pegasus		
#60	Impossible Man	Vol. 3	Vol. 5	Vol. 4: Project Pegasus		
#61	Starhawk	Vol. 3	Vol. 6	Vol. 4: Project Pegasus		Guardians of the Galaxy Epic Collection Vol. 2; Adam Warlock Omnibus Vol. 1; Guardians of the Galaxy: Tomorrow's Heroes Omnibus
#62	Moondragon	Vol. 3	Vol. 6	Vol. 4: Project Pegasus		Guardians of the Galaxy Epic Collection Vol. 2; Adam Warlock Omnibus Vol. 1; Guardians of the Galaxy: Tomorrow's Heroes Omnibus
#63	Adam Warlock	Vol. 3	Vol. 6	Vol. 4: Project Pegasus		Guardians of the Galaxy Epic Collection Vol. 2; Adam Warlock Omnibus Vol. 1; Guardians of the Galaxy: Tomorrow's Heroes Omnibus
#64	Stingray	Vol. 3	Vol. 6	Vol. 4: Project Pegasus		Thing: The Serpent Crown Affair
#65	Triton	Vol. 3	Vol. 6	Vol. 4: Project Pegasus		Thing: The Serpent Crown Affair
#66	Scarlet Witch	Vol. 3	Vol. 6	Vol. 4: Project Pegasus		Thing: The Serpent Crown Affair
#67	Hyperion	Vol. 3	Vol. 6	Vol. 4: Project Pegasus		Thing: The Serpent Crown Affair
#68	Angel	Vol. 3	Vol. 6	Vol. 4: Project Pegasus		
#69	Guardians of the Galaxy	Vol. 3	Vol. 6	Vol. 4: Project Pegasus		Guardians of the Galaxy Epic Collection Vol. 2; Guardians of the Galaxy: Tomorrow's Heroes Omnibus
#70	Yancy Street Gang	Vol. 3	Vol. 6	Vol. 4: Project Pegasus		
#71	Mister Fantastic	Vol. 3	Vol. 6	Vol. 4: Project Pegasus		
#72	The Inhumans	Vol. 3	Vol. 6	Vol. 4: Project Pegasus		
#73	Quasar	Vol. 3	Vol. 6	Vol. 4: Project Pegasus		
#74	Puppet Master	Vol. 3	Vol. 6	Vol. 4: Project Pegasus		
#75	Avengers	Vol. 3	Vol. 7	Vol. 5: Monster Man		
#76	Iceman	Vol. 3	Vol. 7	Vol. 5: Monster Man		
#77	Man-Thing	Vol. 3	Vol. 7	Vol. 5: Monster Man		
#78	Wonder Man	Vol. 4	Vol. 7	Vol. 5: Monster Man		Wonder Man: The Early Years Omnibus
#79	Blue Diamond	Vol. 4	Vol. 7	Vol. 5: Monster Man		
#80	Ghost Rider	Vol. 4	Vol. 7	Vol. 5: Monster Man		
#81	Sub-Mariner	Vol. 4	Vol. 7	Vol. 5: Monster Man		
#82	Captain America	Vol. 4	Vol. 7	Vol. 5: Monster Man		
#83	Sasquatch	Vol. 4	Vol. 8	Vol. 5: Monster Man		Alpha Flight by John Byrne Omnibus
#84	Alpha Flight	Vol. 4	Vol. 8	Vol. 5: Monster Man		Alpha Flight by John Byrne Omnibus
#85	Spider-Woman	Vol. 4	Vol. 8	Vol. 5: Monster Man		
#86	Sandman	Vol. 4	Vol. 8	Vol. 5: Monster Man		
#87	Ant-Man	Vol. 4	Vol. 8	Vol. 5: Monster Man		
#88	She-Hulk	Vol. 4	Vol. 8			Marvel Masterworks: Savage She-Hulk Vol. 2; The Savage She-Hulk Omnibus
#89	The Human Torch	Vol. 4	Vol. 8			
#90	Spider-Man	Vol. 4	Vol. 8			
#91	The Sphinx	Vol. 4	Vol. 8			Nova: Richard Rider Omnibus Vol. 1
#92	Jocasta	Vol. 4	Vol. 8			
#93	Machine Man	Vol. 4	Vol. 8			
#94	Power Man and Iron Fist	Vol. 4				
#95	The Living Mummy	Vol. 4				Marvel Horror Omnibus
#96	Marvel Super Heroes	Vol. 4				
#97	Iron Man	Vol. 4				
#98	Franklin Richards	Vol. 4				
#99	Rom	Not Collected				Rom: The Original Marvel Years Omnibus Vol. 2; Rom Epic Collection: The Original Marvel Years Vol 3
#100	Ben Grimm (alternate universe; a sequel to #50)	Vol. 4				

=== Annuals ===
Issue	Character(s)	Marvel Essentials	Marvel Masterworks	Epic Collection	Omnibus	Other Collections
#1	The Liberty Legion	Vol. 1	Vol. 2	Vol. 2	Vol. 1	Thing: Liberty Legion
#2	Spider-Man, the Avengers vs. Thanos	Vol. 2	Vol. 4	Vol. 3		Marvel Masterworks: The Avengers Vol. 17; Marvel Masterworks: Captain Marvel Vol. 5; Marvel Masterworks: Warlock Vol. 2; Warlock by Jim Starlin; Adam Warlock Omnibus Vol. 1; Avengers Epic Collection Vol. 9; Guardians of the Galaxy Solo Classic Omnibus; The Thanos Wars: Infinity Origins Omnibus; The Death of Captain Marvel Omnibus; Avengers Omnibus Vol 6
#3	Nova vs. the Monitors	Vol. 2	Vol. 4	Vol. 3		Nova: Richard Rider Omnibus Vol. 1
#4	Black Bolt vs. Graviton	Vol. 3	Vol. 5	Vol. 3		
#5	Hulk vs. the Stranger	Vol. 3	Vol. 7	Vol. 5		Thing: The Serpent Crown Affair
#6	American Eagle vs. Klaw	Vol. 4	Vol. 7	Vol. 5		
#7	Hulk, Sub-Mariner, Wonder Man, Sasquatch, Thor, Colossus, Doc Samson vs. The Champion	Vol. 4				

== Collected editions ==
=== Original series ===
- Marvel Two-In-One was first collected in its entirety, (Note: With the exception of issues #21 and 99, as the licensing rights to the characters Doc Savage and Rom the Space Knight, who were the guest stars in those issues, respectively, are no longer held by Marvel.) although in black-and-white, as four volumes of the Essential Marvel paperback reprint line.

Title	Material collected	Published date	ISBN
Essential Marvel Two-In-One Volume 1	Marvel Two-In-One #1–20, 22–25, and Annual #1	November 2005	ISBN 978-0785117292
Essential Marvel Two-In-One Volume 2	Marvel Two-In-One #26–52 and Annual #2–3	June 2007	ISBN 978-0785126980
Essential Marvel Two-In-One Volume 3	Marvel Two-In-One #53–77 and Annual #4–5	July 2009	ISBN 978-0785130697
Essential Marvel Two-In-One Volume 4	Marvel Two-In-One #78–98, #100, and Annual #6–7	January 2012	ISBN 978-0785162841

- The series is currently being collected through the Marvel Masterworks line.

Title	Material collected	Published date	ISBN
Marvel Masterworks: Marvel Two-In-One Volume 1	Marvel Feature #11-12, Marvel Two-In-One #1-10	November 2013	ISBN 978-0785166337
Marvel Masterworks: Marvel Two-In-One Volume 2	Marvel Two-In-One #11-20, Annual #1, Marvel Team-Up #47, Fantastic Four Annual #11	September 2017	ISBN 978-1302903527
Marvel Masterworks: Marvel Two-In-One Volume 3	Marvel Two-In-One #21-36	March 2018	ISBN 978-1302909642
Marvel Masterworks: Marvel Two-In-One Volume 4	Marvel Two-In-One #37-46, Annual #2-3, Avengers Annual #7	August 2019	ISBN 978-1302918156
Marvel Masterworks: Marvel Two-In-One Volume 5	Marvel Two-In-One #47-60, Annual #4	November 2020	ISBN 978-1302922207
Marvel Masterworks: Marvel Two-In-One Volume 6	Marvel Two-In-One #61-74	February 2022	ISBN 978-1302932930
Marvel Masterworks: Marvel Two-In-One Volume 7	Marvel Two-In-One #75-82, Annual #5-6	February 2024	ISBN 978-1302955090
Marvel Masterworks: Marvel Two-In-One Volume 8	Marvel Two-In-One #83-93	August 2025	

- The series is currently being collected in its entirety, in color, through Marvel's Epic Collection paperback reprint line.

Title	Material collected	Published date	ISBN
Marvel Two-In-One Epic Collection Volume 1: Cry Monster	Marvel Feature #11–12, Marvel Two-In-One #1–19, Marvel Team-Up #47	August 2018	ISBN 978-1302913328
Marvel Two-In-One Epic Collection Volume 2: Two Against HYDRA	Marvel Two-In-One #20, 22-36, Marvel Two-In-One Annual #1, Fantastic Four Annual #11	January 2024	ISBN 978-1302931766
Marvel Two-In-One Epic Collection Volume 3: Remembrance of Things Past	Marvel Two-In-One #37-52, Annual #2-4, Avengers Annual #7	January 2025	ISBN 978-1302955649
Marvel Two-In-One Epic Collection Volume 4: Project Pegasus	Marvel Two-In-One #53-74	August 2026	
Marvel Two-In-One Epic Collection Volume 5: Monster Man	Marvel Two-In-One #75-87, Annual #5-6	March 2027	

- The series is currently being collected in oversized hardcover format as part of the Marvel Omnibus line.

Title	Material collected	Published date	ISBN
Marvel Two-In-One Omnibus Volume 1	Marvel Feature (1971) #11-12; Marvel Two-in-One (1974) #1-36; Marvel Two-in-One Annual #1; Marvel Team-Up (1972) #47; Fantastic Four Annual (1963) #11	June 2025	ISBN 978-1302964672

- Three specific arcs have also been released as deluxe hardcovers through the Marvel Premiere Classics reprint line.

Title	Material collected	Published date	ISBN
Thing: Project Pegasus (Note: This arc was originally released as a trade paperback in 1988 entitled The Thing: The Project Pegasus Saga, but it has not been re-released since and is now out of print.)	Marvel Two-In-One #42–43, 53–58	January 2010	ISBN 978-0785138112
Thing: Liberty Legion	Marvel Two-In-One #20, Annual #1, Marvel Premiere #29–30, Invaders #5–6, Fantastic Four Annual #11	July 2011	ISBN 978-0785155157
Thing: The Serpent Crown Affair	Marvel Two-In-One #64–67, Marvel Team-Up Annual #5	May 2012	ISBN 978-0785157618

=== Revival series ===
- The revival series has been released as two trade paperbacks and one oversize hardcover collecting the entire series.

Title	Material collected	Published date	ISBN
Marvel 2-in-One Vol. 1: Fate of the Four	Marvel 2-in-One #1–6	July 2018	ISBN 978-1302910921
Marvel 2-in-One Vol. 2: Next of Kin	Marvel 2-in-One #7–12, Annual #1	February 2019	ISBN 978-1302914912
Fantastic Four: The Fate of the Four	Marvel 2-in-One #1-12, Annual #1	December 2021	ISBN 978-1302931278
