= Avengers Disassembled =

2004 Marvel Comics storyline

- Promotional art for Avengers #503 by David Finch
- Publisher: Marvel Comics
- Publication date: August 2004 – January 2005
- Genre: Superhero; Crossover
Title(s)
- Avengers vol. 3, #500–503
- Avengers Finale #1
- Captain America vol. 4, #29–32
- Captain America and the Falcon #5–7
- Fantastic Four #517–519
- Iron Man vol. 3, #84–89
- The Spectacular Spider-Man vol. 2, #15–20
- Thor vol. 2, #80–85
- What If? Avengers Disassembled #1
- Main character: Avengers

Creative team
- Writers: Brian Michael Bendis (Avengers and Avengers Finale); Robert Kirkman (Captain America); Paul Jenkins (The Spectacular Spider-Man); John Jackson Miller (Iron Man); Mike Oeming (Thor); Christopher Priest (Captain America and the Falcon); Mark Ricketts (Iron Man); Mark Waid (Fantastic Four)
- Pencillers: Joe Bennett (Captain America and the Falcon); Jim Cheung (Avengers Finale); Oliver Coipel (flashbacks); Anil Prasad (Thor); Scot Eaton (Captain America); Steve Epting (Avengers Finale); David Finch (Avengers); Gary Frank (Avengers Finale); Michael Gaydos (Avengers Finale); Tony Harris (Iron Man); Jorge Lucas (Iron Man); David Mack (Avengers Finale); Alex Maleev (Avengers Finale); Mike Mayhew (Avengers Finale); Steve McNiven (Avengers Finale); Paco Medina (The Spectacular Spider-Man); Mike Oeming (Avengers Finale); George Pérez (Avengers Finale); Eric Powell (Avengers Finale); Humberto Ramos (The Spectacular Spider-Man); Darick Robertson (Avengers Finale); Michael Ryan (The Spectacular Spider-Man); Lee Weeks (Avengers Finale); Mike Wieringo (Fantastic Four)
- Avengers Disassembled HC: ISBN 0-7851-2294-X
- Avengers Disassembled: Iron Man, Thor & Captain America: ISBN 0785138846

"Avengers Disassembled" is a 2004 crossover storyline published by Marvel Comics involving the Avengers, Fantastic Four, Captain America, Spider-Man and Thor. The beginning of Brian Michael Bendis's Avengers run, it depicts the destruction of the existing traditional roster and the exile of several key members of the team. The storyline includes a number of subplots, some of which take place before or after the main events, which include other changes to the status quo: Iron Man once again closeting his secret identity, Spider-Man developing organic web-shooters (as in the contemporary Sam Raimi film trilogy), and the death of Thor and Asgard in one final Ragnarok.

The main story, Chaos, ran in Avengers #500-503 and a special epilogue, Avengers Finale. The series would lead to a massive relaunch of the Avengers family of titles: New Avengers, New Thunderbolts, Captain America, and Iron Man; and the launch of Young Avengers.

== Plot summary ==
=== Avengers ===
Jack of Hearts, who had been dead before the storyline, arrives at Avengers Mansion and explodes, damaging the mansion. Scott Lang is killed in the blast. The Vision pilots a Quinjet into the partially damaged Mansion, causing more damage.

Elsewhere, Wanda Maximoff arrives at the United Nations, where she speaks with Captain America, who announces that he is ending their fledgling relationship. Tony Stark suddenly becomes drunk and belligerent despite not having imbibed any alcohol at an important United Nations meeting to decide if the Avengers should have their security clearance revoked following the events of Secret War. After Tony drunkenly attempts to pick a fight with the Latverian ambassador, the Avengers UN charter is revoked; Iron Man leaves Hank Pym to respond to the "Code White" from Avengers Mansion.

Leaving the crashed Quinjet, Vision warns the Avengers of a mysterious plan to destroy the team and then vomits up eggs that spawn Ultron drones that attack the Avengers. She-Hulk becomes consumed with bloodlust, killing Vision and attacking Wasp and Captain America.

She-Hulk is subdued by Iron Man and Captain America and Hank Pym joins them and rushes Wasp to the hospital. Returning, Hank reveals to Captain America and the team of Iron Man's drunken outburst at the UN and the UN's decision to revoke their charter. All past members of the Avengers gather at the mansion, fearing that Ultron may be behind the attack. Suddenly an armada of Kree soldiers appear in the sky and attack Manhattan. In the ensuing battle, Hawkeye's arrows are hit, causing their explosives to go off. In his dying moments, Hawkeye takes out a Kree battleship in the blast after taking flight with a commandeered Kree jet pack.

In the wake of Hawkeye's death, Doctor Strange appears for the first time since the Dark Dimension invasion several months earlier. He explains to the Avengers that the inexplicable events—Tony's sudden inebriation, She-Hulk and Vision's loss of control, Jack of Heart's resurrection, and the enemies they have encountered—are magical and that their trail leads to Wanda. A flashback reveals that Wanda has lost her sanity after an errant comment about motherhood from the Wasp triggered a suppressed memory of Wanda's lost twin children, William and Thomas. The children were magical constructs Wanda created in an impossible conception between her and the Vision. They were lost when both children were magically absorbed by the villain Master Pandemonium, and the memory was suppressed by Wanda's mentor, Agatha Harkness, reasoning that the children were unnatural constructs and better for Wanda to forget. The reawakened memory has caused Wanda to lose her sanity and blame the Avengers for the loss of her children. Strange reveals that the abilities previous ascribed to Wanda's chaos magic are actually uncontrolled manifestations of her ability to warp reality, and that she must be taken down immediately before she threatens the world in her current mental state.

The Avengers visit Harkness' home and find her long dead, having been killed by Wanda. The Avengers find Wanda, who summons an army of the Avengers' past enemies to destroy them, including a version of Rogue, Red Skull, and a group of SS troops. Doctor Strange uses the Eye of Agamotto to put Wanda into a coma. Before the Avengers can decide what to do or how to deal with their losses, Magneto arrives to retrieve Wanda from the Avengers, much to Captain America's dismay and horror. Reluctantly, he allows Magneto to take his daughter with him after he vows to help her with the assistance of Charles Xavier.

In the aftermath, the Avengers disband, but reminisce about their numerous triumphs and memories of one another. Pietro Maximoff arrives and apologizes for Wanda, letting them know that Xavier is attempting to fix Wanda's mind, before speeding away. The remaining members accept their losses, discuss Wanda's history, and struggle with forgiveness. Ultimately, they toast to their fallen comrades, including Wanda. As they leave the destroyed headquarters, they are greeted by a civilian vigil, bearing candles and signs expressing gratitude for the heroes.

=== Iron Man ===
After rescuing Force from the corrupt senators who have been trying to kill Tony Stark since he became U.S. Defense Secretary, Iron Man finds himself targeted by an impostor who murders his longtime love interest Rumiko Fujikawa. Iron Man eventually defeats his impersonator and brings down the ring of corrupt senators who organized the murder and blackmailed Force. Realizing that his loved ones are being targeted by his enemies, Stark gives a press conference where he announces that he is resigning as Defense Secretary and will no longer actively be Iron Man, in favor of returning to "subordinates" filling the role for him.

=== Thor ===
A mystic force that is the living embodiment of Ragnarok has begun slaying the Asgardian gods in rapid succession. Investigating the genocide of his people, Thor discovers that the universe itself is seeking to eliminate the Asgardians for cheating death by surviving countless previous attempts by the universe to fulfill Ragnarok and wipe out the Asgardians. Ultimately, Thor allows himself to be destroyed, as all known Asgardians are destroyed.

=== Captain America and Falcon ===
Captain America and Falcon are in the midst of an international scandal between a naval intelligence operation (ONI) and a drug cartel with ties to A.I.M when Captain America starts having hallucinations; some of them involve encounters with the Scarlet Witch. Meanwhile, Falcon is gifted a new enhanced costume from Wakanda, and uses it to escape the feds. Captain America discusses his past with Scarlet Witch, most notably his guilt from the death of Bucky Barnes, and she eases his trouble. While they engage in a romance, Captain America cites that he can not give her the normal life she desires due to his own emotional issues. His apparent romance with the Scarlet Witch ceases just prior to the UN meeting to retain their UN Charter. Wanda oddly tells him she has no recollection of their romance, indicating Captain America was subject to a hallucination. Captain America later believes that due to the events of "Avengers Disassembled," Wanda was responsible for his visions and Falcon's aggressive behavior. Following the events of "Disassembled", Captain America rekindles a relationship with Diamondback (Rachel Leighton). Meanwhile, the Red Skull conspires with a corrupt S.H.I.E.L.D. agent to kill Captain America, using Diamondback, but his plan backfires. During these events, Steve realizes his love for Rachel.

=== Spectacular Spider-Man ===
Peter Parker finds himself locked in a desperate battle with Ana Soria (a.k.a. "The Queen"), a mysterious villainess with the ability to control her minions with powerful pheromones. During their first confrontation, a captive Peter is forcefully kissed by the Queen, causing him to mutate into a grotesque human-spider hybrid over the course of many days. As he attempts to return himself to normal, it is revealed that the Queen's powers are the result of an American military experiment from World War II, and she has returned to seek revenge on the US government for abandoning her after the war.

In his final confrontation with the Queen, Peter stops her from destroying all human life in New York City with a biological bomb. In the course of the battle, he is fully transformed into a monstrous spider, but the transformation has the unintended side-effect of making him pregnant—allowing him to give birth to a perfect replica of his old human self, with all of his memories fully intact. In his new form, Peter possesses the ability to shoot organic webbing from his wrists, eliminating the need for his homemade "web-shooters".

=== Fantastic Four ===
While the Avengers face the destruction of their mansion and the invading Kree armada, Wizard and the Frightful Four launch a surprise attack on the Fantastic Four, defeating the heroes and seizing control over the Baxter Building. The Fantastic Four ultimately regroup.

== Aftermath ==
In the wake of "Avengers Disassembled", two new Avengers series were created. The New Avengers title replaced the Avengers title (with a new No. 1 in December 2004) which ended with issue No. 503 and Avengers Finale (November 2004). This new title continued with the creative team of writer Brian Michael Bendis and artist David Finch. The other title, premiering February 2005, was Young Avengers, which featured teenage heroes, each of whom (except Hawkeye) related in some way to the legacy of the Avengers. This series was written by Allan Heinberg, a writer for The OC, with art by Jim Cheung. The group was revived by its creators in July 2010 with the bimonthly series Avengers: The Children's Crusade which is a follow-up to Disassembled and House of M.

The Scarlet Witch's storyline continued in the pages of Excalibur, where Magneto and Professor X tried helping her, to no avail. This in turn led into the House of M mini-series and crossover, also written by Bendis.

The event is now considered by Marvel editors as the first part of a long series of events, which includes House of M, Decimation, Planet Hulk, Civil War, The Initiative, Endangered Species, World War Hulk, Messiah Complex, Divided We Stand, Secret Invasion, Manifest Destiny, Dark Reign, Messiah War, Utopia, Nation X and Necrosha. All these grim events lead up to Siege written by Brian Michael Bendis in 2010, which ushers in a new Heroic Age for Marvel, and X-Men: Second Coming by Christopher Yost and Craig Kyle, which sees the slow rebirth of Earth's mutant population.

The Avengers killed during Disassembled all returned to life in separate events. Hawkeye was rematerialized by Wanda during the House of M story. Ant-Man is rescued by the time-traveling Young Avengers during The Children's Crusade, with Stature saving him from Jack of Hearts' explosion. The Vision is successfully rebuilt by Tony Stark after Fear Itself, and Jack of Hearts is restored by a team of scientists of Project Pegasus: during an assault of a pack of zombified clones of Squadron Supreme, a source of zero-point energy aggregates taking the corporeal form of Jack Hart.

== List of crossover issues ==
- Avengers #500–503 (main story)
- Avengers Finale (epilogue)
- Captain America #29–32 (aftermath)
- Captain America and the Falcon #5–7 (prologue)
- Fantastic Four #517–519 (aftermath)
- Iron Man #84–85 (prologue) and #86–89 (aftermath)
- Spectacular Spider-Man #15–20 (prologue)
- Excalibur #8 (parallel story)
- Thor #80–81 (prologue) and #82–85 (parallel story)

Although not bannered as a part of the crossover, the events of Stormbreaker: The Saga of Beta Ray Bill are a direct sequel to the story in Thor.

== Later references to the storyline ==
=== New Avengers Disassembled ===
Although not directly connected with the previous storyline, Bendis's 5th arc on New Avengers is titled "New Avengers: Disassembled", a reference to "Avengers Disassembled". It deals with the events of the Civil War (in which superheroes were forced to register with the government or be arrested) on the New Avengers, and how the team's varying opinions have caused them to break apart. The first three issues featured Captain America, Jessica Drew and Luke Cage's opinions on the matter, all who have heavily weighed against the registration. The next two featured the Sentry and Iron Man, both of whom were for registration. (New Avengers #21-25)

=== Avengers: The Initiative Disassembled ===
Like the 5th arc of Bendis's New Avengers, the storyline of Avengers: The Initiative also references Avengers: Disassembled, complete with a banner reminiscent of the original. Issue No. 21, the first in the Dark Reign event, centers on the aftermath of the failed Skrull invasion, and the revelation that the shape-shifting aliens had infiltrated and corrupted the Fifty-State Initiative and Camp Hammond, where the registered heroes were trained. Most disturbingly, Camp Hammond and the Initiative were largely under the supervision of Hank Pym, but Pym had in fact been replaced by a Skrull years earlier. This is an opportunity for "top cop" Norman Osborn, the newly appointed director of H.A.M.M.E.R. (formerly S.H.I.E.L.D.) to radically redefine how the Initiative will fit into the new order—to his own advantage. Thus, the whole structure (and much of the cast) of Avengers: The Initiative is disassembled. (Avengers: The Initiative #21-25)

=== Avengers/New Avengers: End Times ===
Bendis's last Avengers and New Avengers storylines used a red smashed Avengers symbol and a black text box with white text in same font as the Disassembled logo on the front covers of each issue of those stories. (Avengers #31-34, New Avengers #31-34)

=== Ultimates Disassembled ===
The 6th story arc of the 4th series of The Ultimate Comics series The Ultimates used the Disassembled name complete with the black box white text logo.

== Other versions ==
=== What If? ===
On November 1, 2006, Marvel released a "What If?" special showing a different outcome to the storyline. In this alternate reality, the Beast, sensing something wrong, investigates afterward. He and Warbird go to see Doctor Strange, who claims to have no knowledge of what occurred. Strange uses his abilities to see the event, claiming that is not really him. They deduce that Wanda used her magics to make everyone believe Strange had defeated her and Magneto then took her away. Beast eventually figures out that Captain America, his mind suffering long-term damage from his years in ice, had pushed Wanda to do this, using the deaths to power her. They remake Genosha into a mutant paradise and Magneto fights to defend his daughter from the Avengers and the X-Men, who all end up dead as the Scarlet Witch's spell is interrupted by Rogue. In the end, Wanda and Captain America allow themselves to be taken to oblivion to stop any more harm being done. Only Rogue, Ms. Marvel, Beast, Falcon, Cyclops, Iron Man, and Strange are left – they were the ones who were directly confronting Captain America and Wanda – and a guilt-ridden Beast, learning from Uatu that Captain America would have recovered from his illness and abandoned his manipulative relationship with the Witch as he became leader of a new team of Avengers if Beast had done nothing, realizes that he should have left everything alone.

=== Earth-5012 ===
In an alternate world, the Avengers were never disassembled, but were subsequently captured by an alien race called the Trellions when the Vision detected the arrival of their agent Titannus, a brainwashed Skrull super-soldier. The Wasp was quickly killed, Hank Pym - apparently another Hulk in this reality - was announced missing in action, and Captain America was executed to break their spirit, the reserve Avengers taking five years to rescue them and another five to battle the Trellions. At some point, Reed Richards apparently attempted to conquer the world, Iron Man taking on a Doctor-Doom-like apparel to oppose him and killing the Human Torch before Richards sent him to Earth-616 prior to Titannus's arrival on that Earth. This Iron Man has since become the villain Iron Maniac, being kept in stasis in a Helicarrier, while the Titannus of Earth-616 was defeated by a team assembled by Doctor Strange.

== Parodies ==
The Great Lakes Avengers miniseries GLA: Misassembled (2005), written by Dan Slott and pencilled by Paul Pelletier, provided a tongue-in-cheek reference to Avengers Disassembled. In a move satirizing comic book deaths, one character dies in each issue: Dinah Soar, Grasshopper, Monkey Joe, Doorman, and Mr. Immortal. However, Doorman and Immortal are later resurrected. Three other characters named Grasshopper are introduced and killed in later issues of GLA, continuing the parody.

== Collected editions ==
Title	Material collected	Published date	ISBN
Avengers Disassembled	Avengers #500–503 and Avengers Finale	February 2005	978-1846533211
New Avengers Omnibus Volume 1	Avengers #500–503, Avengers Finale, New Avengers #1-31, Annual #1; New Avengers Most Wanted Files; New Avengers : Custom 676: Army & Air Force; Giant-Size Spider-Woman #1; New Avengers: Illuminati #1; Civil War: The Confession #1; and Civil War: The Initiative #1	September 2012	978-0785164890
New Avengers by Brian Michael Bendis: The Complete Collection Vol. 1	Avengers #500–503, Avengers Finale, New Avengers #1-10, New Avengers Most Wanted Files	January 2017	978-1302903626
Avengers Disassembled: Iron Man	Iron Man #84–89	January 2007	978-0785116530
Avengers Disassembled: Captain America	Captain America #29–32 and Captain America And The Falcon #5–7	December 2004	978-0785116486
Avengers Disassembled: Thor	Thor #80–85	December 2004	978-0785115991
Thor: Ragnaroks	Thor #80–85 and Thor: Blood Oath #1-6, Stormbreaker: The Saga of Beta Ray Bill #1-6	October 2017	978-1302907945
Avengers Disassembled: Iron Man, Thor & Captain America	Thor #80–85, Iron Man #84–89, Captain America & The Falcon #5–7, and Captain America #29–32	April 2009	978-0785138846
Fantastic Four Volume 5: Disassembled	Fantastic Four #514-519	December 2004	978-0785115366
Fantastic Four By Mark Waid and Mike Wieringo: Ultimate Collection - Book Four	Fantastic Four #514-524	December 2011	978-0785156611
Spectacular Spider-Man Volume 4: Disassembled	Spectacular Spider-Man (vol. 2) #15-20	December 2004	978-0785116264
