= Flatman (character) =

Marvel Comics superhero

- Flatman as depicted on the cover of G.L.A. #2 (July 2005). Art by Paul Pelletier.

Publication information
- Publisher: Marvel Comics
- First appearance: The West Coast Avengers vol. 2 #46 (July 1989)
- Created by: John Byrne

In-story information
- Alter ego: Matt (surname unrevealed)
- Species: Human mutant
- Team affiliations: Great Lakes Avengers
- Notable aliases: The 2-D Defender; Dr. Val Ventura
- Abilities: Origami shapeshifting; Flat body; Elasticity

Flatman (Matt) is a superhero appearing in American comic books published by Marvel Comics. Created by John Byrne, the character first appeared in West Coast Avengers #46 (July 1989). Flatman belongs to the subspecies of humans called mutants, who are born with superhuman abilities. He is a member of the Great Lakes Avengers.

== Publication history ==
Flatman debuted in West Coast Avengers #46 (July 1989), created by writer and artist John Byrne. He appeared in the 2005 GLX-Mas Special one-shot. He appeared in the 2016 Great Lakes Avengers series. He appeared in the 2018 Fantastic Four series. He appeared in the 2022 Avengers Unlimited Infinity Comic series.

== Fictional character biography ==
Flatman's real name is Matt. After dropping out of community college, he worked as a barista before being approached by a party organizer named Andrew. Matt worked for him pretending to be Mister Fantastic. He grew sick of the job and changed his name to Val Ventura in the hopes of becoming a superhero.

Flatman becomes a member and second-in-command of the Great Lakes Avengers, an unauthorized division of the Avengers that operates in Wisconsin. Although no true origin was given at first for his stretching abilities and odd appearance, it is later revealed that he is a mutant.

Flatman and the Great Lakes Avengers are first seen in public by Hawkeye and Mockingbird, who agree to become their mentors. Called the "2-D Avenger," Flatman's primary roles include long-ranged rescues and helping the team solve crimes with his extensive knowledge of fashion. He later rescues Weasel — referring to him as "sailor" — which leads his team to question his sexuality.

At first, Flatman denies any claims that he is gay. When Avengers recruit Living Lightning, who is gay, first approaches the Great Lakes Avengers (usually abbreviated as GLA), he believes them to be the Gay/Lesbian Alliance. After apologizing, Living Lightning leaves quickly. However, his willingness to come out to others gives Flatman the courage to do so himself, revealing himself as gay to his teammates.

=== GLA: Misassembled ===
During the G.L.A. mini-series, the team takes on Maelstrom, who is trying to destroy the universe. After Dinah Soar is killed, Mr. Immortal suffers a nervous breakdown and Flatman becomes deputy leader. Deciding that the team needs new members, he and Doorman go to New York City for a recruitment drive, which is unsuccessful. While the two are in Central Park, Squirrel Girl and her sidekick Monkey Joe save them from muggers. They later offer her to join the team and she accepts. Soon after, they hear an alarm on a nearby factory and encounter Grasshopper, who is battling Batroc the Leaper and his lackeys. During the battle, Flatman offers Grasshopper membership in the team and he accepts, but is killed by Zaran immediately afterward. Refusing to let the deaths of Dinah Soar and Grasshopper get him down, Flatman tries to persuade the team to further research Maelstrom's plans for universal destruction. After Mr. Immortal regains his sanity, the team rallies to stop Maelstrom. During the final battle, Flatman is seemingly sucked into a vortex created by Maelstrom. However, it turns out that only his clothes had been sucked off and he was standing at an extreme angle so he would not be seen naked. With the GLA possessing a stronger resolve than ever, they return to their headquarters, only for Flatman to find that Tony Stark had sent a cease and desist notice ordering them to stop using the Avengers name. After discovering that they are all mutants, the team changes their name to the Great Lakes X-Men, complete with new costumes.

=== Great Lakes Champions ===
The Great Lake X-Men are invited to the annual Superheroes Poker Tournament. In the end, Flatman wins the tournament with a straight-flush, beating the Thing's four fours. After being discouraged from using the names "Great Lakes X-Men" and "Great Lakes Defenders" by members of those teams present at the tournament, the team rename themselves the Great Lakes Champions, despite protests from former Champions member Hercules.

=== Civil War/The Initiative ===
All of the Great Lakes Champions register with the United States government as required by the Superhuman Registration Act. Deadpool mistakenly attempts to apprehend them for violating the Act, only to be informed that they had already registered.

Flatman has been identified as one of the 142 registered superheroes who are part of the Initiative. He and his Initiative group, dubbed the Great Lakes Initiative, are tasked with rescuing Dionysus. He has fallen from Mount Olympus and been captured by A.I.M., who plan to use his powers to cause mental instability in every superhero they consider a threat. During their mission, Flatman and Mr. Immortal are ambushed by Deadpool. Flatman instead recruits him as a reserve member of the Initiative, but Deadpool eventually overstays his welcome and is kicked out by Squirrel Girl.

=== Secret Invasion ===
During the Secret Invasion storyline, the team confronts a Skrull disguised as Grasshopper, with help from Gravity and Catwalk. During the battle, Flatman invites Gravity to join the team, but he quickly rejects the offer. They later appeared to welcome Gravity as leader of the team after he is transferred to Wisconsin by Norman Osborn.

=== Great Lakes Avengers (2016 series) ===
In the ongoing series The Great Lakes Avengers, it is revealed that the team had disbanded and gone their separate ways. Flatman had written a mostly exaggerated autobiography book and has been living off the residual checks from it. He then receives a visit from Connie Ferrari, a lawyer representing the real Avengers who informs him that the GLA has been reinstated as a permanent addition to the Avengers. He meets with Big Bertha and Doorman at a diner, while expressing concern that Mr. Immortal and Squirrel Girl have not answered his call. The team is later relocated to Detroit, Michigan. They go to a local bar to try to convince its owner, Nain Rouge, to turn down the music. Rogue instead refuses and begins to insult them, particularly Immortal and Bertha. The GLA are arrested, but break out of prison shortly afterwards. They confront Goodness Silva, a young girl who can transform into a werewolf-like form and is attacking the police inside the station. They are later released thanks to Connie Ferrari despite the accusations of councilman Dick Snerd, who is actually Naine Rouge. After going on patrol together, Immortal and Flatman learn that Bertha and Good Boy have taken Snerd hostage. When Connie visits the base, they attempt to keep Snerd's abduction secret, but she quickly finds out. After seeing that Good Boy brutalized Snerd, the team drops him off at the hospital.

After Connie tells the team to lie low for a couple of days, Bertha goes to a modeling gig while Flatman and Mr. Immortal are visited by Good Boy's brother Lucky, who tells her that they need to leave town due to what she did to Nain Rogue. Later, while fixing the Flatmobile, Flatman and Immortal receive a text message from Bertha, who was injured while fighting Dr. Nod and his squad. During the battle, Nod transforms into a monstrous state after taking weight-loss supplements. Immortal and Doorman travel inside Nod's body, where Immortal manages to kill him by punching his heart. After their victory, the team is visited by Deadpool, who tells them that they have been fired and can no longer use the Avengers name.

== Powers and abilities ==
Flatman possesses the ability to stretch any part of his body to great lengths. He can withstand all forms of physical injury at a superhuman level, appear to be nearly invisible by standing at just the right angle and slip through very thin spaces, owing to his nearly two-dimensional body. He can also turn his entire body into any shape, including animals such as frogs or monkeys, in the style of origami. Initially, Flatman never appeared to be able to assume a "normal" three-dimensional shape. However, he has since revealed that he can assume that shape at will.

== Reception ==
=== Critical response ===
Comic Book Resources ranked Flatman 1st in their "10 Marvel Superheroes Who Are ISFJs" list, 6th in their "Great Lakes Avengers: Every Member" list, and 5th in their "10 Most Powerful Members Of The Great Lakes Avengers" list, Darren Franich of Entertainment Weekly ranked Flatman 24th in their "Let's Rank Every Avenger Ever" list.

== In other media ==
=== Television ===
Flatman as depicted in Fantastic Four: World's Greatest Heroes.

- Flatman appears in the Fantastic Four: World's Greatest Heroes episode "The Cure", voiced by Brian Dobson. This version is a failed applicant to the Fantastic Four who Mister Fantastic rejected because of their similar abilities.
- Flatman appears in The Super Hero Squad Show episode "The Ice Melt Cometh!", voiced by Jonathan Mankuta. This version is a Flat Earther and does not believe in climate change.
- Flatman makes a cameo appearance in the X-Men '97 episode "Survival of the Fittest" as a brief transformation of the character Morph.

=== Merchandise ===
Flatman received a paper doll packaged with the one-shot GLX-Mas Special.
