= Big Bertha (character) =

Fictional superhero appearing in Marvel Comics

Publication information
- Publisher: Marvel Comics
- First appearance: West Coast Avengers vol. 2 #46 (July 1989)
- Created by: John Byrne (writer and artist)

In-story information
- Alter ego: Bertha Crawford (currently); Ashley Crawford (formerly)
- Species: Human mutant
- Team affiliations: Great Lakes Avengers
- Notable aliases: Ample Amazon
- Abilities: Size and mass alteration; Superhuman strength, durability, and leaping

Big Bertha (born Ashley Crawford and legally changed to Bertha Crawford) is a superhero appearing in American comic books published by Marvel Comics. Created by John Byrne, the character first appeared in West Coast Avengers vol. 2 #46 (July 1989). Big Bertha belongs to the subspecies of humans called mutants, who are born with superhuman abilities. She is also a member of the Great Lakes Avengers.

== Publication history ==
Big Bertha debuted in West Coast Avengers vol. 2 #46 (July 1989), created by writer and artist John Byrne. She appeared in the 2005 GLX-Mas Special one-shot. She appeared in the 2016 Great Lakes Avengers series. She appeared in the 2018 Fantastic Four series. She appeared in the 2022 Avengers Unlimited Infinity Comic series.

== Fictional character biography ==
Not much is known of Bertha's life before she responded to Mr. Immortal's advertisement for a hero team, the team who would become the Great Lakes Avengers. The G.L.A. mini-series reveals her to be a mutant.

When not using her powers, Ashley is a proverbial "big fish in a small pond", being a famous fashion model in Milwaukee, Wisconsin, her hometown. Although offers have come her way numerous times for more prospective opportunities, she has declined them all, choosing to stay in Milwaukee with the team she considers family. After seeing the team in public, Hawkeye and Mockingbird agree to become their mentors.

=== GLA: Misassembled ===
During the G.L.A. mini-series, the team battles Maelstrom, who is trying to destroy the universe. After Dinah Soar is killed, Big Bertha considers quitting the team to focus on her modeling career, but decides to stay. She later captures Leather Boy, a rejected GLA member, who had infiltrated the team's headquarters and killed Mr. Immortal and Monkey Joe. During a later battle with Maelstrom, Bertha tries to save Flatman from being sucked into a vortex, but he is seemingly killed. It turns out that only Flatman's clothes had been sucked off and that he was standing at an extreme angle so he would not be seen naked. After their victory, the GLA return to their headquarters, only to find that Tony Stark had sent a cease and desist notice ordering them to stop using the Avengers name. After discovering that they are all mutants, the team change their name to the Great Lakes X-Men, complete with new costumes.

=== Great Lakes Champions ===
The team participates in a charity superhero poker tournament hosted by the Thing, with Flatman winning in the final round. Flatman's status as champion inspires the team to rename themselves the Great Lakes Champions. They ignore the protests of Hercules, a former member of the Champions.

=== Civil War/The Initiative ===
All of the Great Lakes Champions register with the United States government as required by the Superhuman Registration Act. Deadpool mistakenly attempts to apprehend them for violating the Act, only to be defeated and informed that they had already registered.

Big Bertha and her teammates are placed in charge of the Initiative group in Wisconsin, calling themselves the Great Lakes Initiative. They are tasked with rescuing Dionysus after he falls from Mount Olympus and is captured by A.I.M., who plan to use his powers to cause mental instability in every superhero they consider a threat. During the task, Deadpool ambushes Mr. Immortal and Flatman. Flatman recruits Deadpool as a reserve member of the team, but he eventually overstayed his welcome. In an attempt to evict Deadpool from their Initiative-sponsored headquarters, Big Bertha agrees on one date. Bertha eventually realizes that Deadpool was only attracted to her large form. She lectures him, telling of her experiences of only being valued for her looks in her slim form. In response, Deadpool removes his mask revealing his cancer-scarred face. Bertha promptly vomits in the parking lot, much to Deadpool's chagrin. Later, Squirrel Girl manages to evict Deadpool.

=== Great Lakes Avengers (2016 series) ===
In the ongoing series The Great Lakes Avengers, it is revealed that the team had disbanded and gone their separate ways. Ashley had changed her name legally to Bertha for a more consistent personal brand and officially became a plus size model. She then meets Flatman and Doorman at a diner, after being informed that the GLA has been reinstated as a permanent addition to the Avengers. The team relocates to Detroit, Michigan.

The team then goes to a local bar to try to convince the owner to turn down the music. The owner, named Nain Rogue, instead refuses and begins to insult them, particularly Mr. Immortal and Bertha. The group is arrested, but Doorman escapes by teleporting out of jail. The other GLA members are left to deal with Goodness Silva, a girl with the ability to transform into a werewolf-like state who is attacking the police inside the station. They are later released thanks to Connie Ferrari, despite the accusations of councilman Dick Snerd, who is actually Nain Rouge. Big Bertha is present when Goodness Silva joins the Great Lakes Avengers under the name Good Boy.

After learning that Snerd is Nain Rouge, Bertha and Good Boy take him hostage. Realizing that Snerd has numerous connections and would potentially get back on the streets, Good Boy transforms and brutally assaults Snerd. Later, the team drop off a gravely injured Snerd at the hospital.

After Connie tells the team to lie low for a couple of days, Bertha goes to a modeling gig for a weight-loss product created by Dr. Nod. She then discovers that the gig was a trap set up by Nod to get a sample of her DNA and use it to improve his product with Bertha's powers. Bertha fights back, but Nod ingests much of the supplements, becoming a huge monster, and injures her. Bertha sends a text to the rest of her teammates and takes some of the supplements herself to fight Nod. During the battle, Nod takes more of the supplements, becoming much bigger and monstrous. On Mr. Immortal's suggestion, the team performs a maneuver that has Doorman and Immortal get inside Nod's body, where Immortal kills Nod by punching his heart. After their victory, the team is visited by Deadpool, who tells them that they have been fired and can no longer use the Avengers name.

== Powers and abilities ==
Big Bertha has the ability to alter her own body's fat contents at will. In this form, she possesses superhuman strength and durability, and is bulletproof. Bertha suggested that these capabilities are actually based on the manipulation of body mass, so she can selectively increase fatty tissues in those specific anatomical parts to control their size. She is able to purge the excess fat from her body through induced vomiting, and retain a slim figure.

In addition to her mutant powers, she is also described as a wealthy supermodel, formidable unarmed combatant, skilled aircraft pilot, and a proficient card player.

== Reception ==
=== Critical response ===
Deirdre Kaye of Scary Mommy called Big Bertha a "role model" and a "truly heroic" female character. Comic Book Resources ranked Big Bertha 2nd in their "Great Lakes Avengers: Every Member" list, 4th in their "Marvel: 10 Most Powerful Members Of The Great Lakes Avengers" list, and 7th in their "Avengers: The 10 Most Powerful Recruits From The Fifty State Initiative" list.

=== Analysis ===
Jack Gaul of Comic Book Resources included Big Bertha in their "10 Marvel Comics That Accurately Portray Mental Health Conditions" list, writing, "Bertha's transformations require behaviors associated with bulimia. She doesn't eat in excess to grow, but she must induce vomiting if and when she decides to shed the mass, which is always disturbing and likely traumatic. Before she was comfortable as Bertha full-time, Ashley's routine of vomiting to maintain a beauty standard had striking similarities to dysmorphic disorders, despite the drastic physical change it brought."

== Other versions ==
=== Ultimate Marvel ===
An alternate universe version of Big Bertha from Earth-1610 makes a minor appearance in Ultimate X-Men #50 as a Coney Island freak show attraction.

=== Deadpool MAX ===
An alternate universe version of Big Bertha from an unidentified universe appears in Deadpool Max. This version is a human stripper.

== In other media ==
Big Bertha makes a non-speaking cameo appearance in the Wolverine and the X-Men episode "Greetings from Genosha".
