= Doorman (character) =

DeMarr Davis Doorman
- Art for West Coast Avengers vol. 2 #49.

Publication information
- Publisher: Marvel Comics
- First appearance: West Coast Avengers #46 (July 1989)
- Created by: John Byrne

In-story information
- Alter ego: DeMarr Davis
- Species: Human mutant/Angel of Death hybrid
- Team affiliations: Great Lakes Avengers
- Notable aliases: The Living Portal; Man of Doors; Deathurge
- Abilities: As a mutant: Teleportation; Intangibility; As the Angel of Death: Darkforce manipulation; Superhuman durability; Costume summoning; Death sense; Immortality; Flight

DeMarr Davis is a superhero appearing in American comic books published by Marvel Comics. Created by writer and artist John Byrne, the character first appeared in West Coast Avengers #46 (July 1989). Davis belongs to the genetic branch of humans called mutants, who are born with superhuman abilities. He is primarily known as Doorman. Following his death, Doorman was resurrected by the entity Oblivion to serve as an Angel of Death, granting him new abilities. In addition to his portal-based powers, he gained flight, teleportation, and the ability to create objects using Darkforce energy. The character has also been a member of the Great Lakes Avengers at various points in his history.

DeMarr Davis made his live-action debut in the Disney+ original series Wonder Man (2026), set in the Marvel Cinematic Universe (MCU) and was portrayed by Byron Bowers.

== Publication history ==
DeMarr Davis debuted in West Coast Avengers #46 (July 1989), created by John Byrne. He appeared in the 2005 G.L.A. series, and the 2016 Great Lakes Avengers series.

== Fictional character biography ==
Little is known of Doorman's life before he responded to Mr. Immortal's advertisement for the hero team that would eventually become the Great Lakes Avengers. It has been revealed, however, that he is a mutant and is African-American.

Before joining the Great Lakes Avengers, DeMarr Davis was an average American. Sometime during his years in college, DeMarr's mother died. After completing four years of college and three years of graduate school, DeMarr decided to answer Mr. Immortal's newspaper ad asking "costumed adventurers" to work together and form a team. DeMarr, being a mutant with a unique teleporting ability, is able to allow his teammates entrance into almost any structure. He is a founding member of the Great Lakes Avengers. Doorman is first seen in public with the team by Hawkeye and Mockingbird, who later agree to become their mentors.

During the G.L.A. mini-series, the team takes on Maelstrom, who is trying to destroy the universe. After Dinah Soar is killed, Mr. Immortal suffers a nervous breakdown, leading Flatman and Doorman to search for new members. They travel to New York City, where they fail to recruit a number of heroes. While in Central Park, Squirrel Girl and her sidekick Monkey Joe save the two from muggers. They offer to recruit her in the team and she accepts. Later, they hear an alarm on a nearby factory and encounter Grasshopper, who is battling Batroc the Leaper and his minions. During the battle, Flatman offers to recruit him and Grasshopper quickly accepts, only to be instantly killed by Zaran, one of Batroc's minions. DeMarr blames himself for Grasshopper's death.

During the final battle, Doorman sacrifices himself so that Mr. Immortal can stop Maelstrom. In the afterlife, he meets the other deceased GLA members, including Grasshopper, who forgives him. Doorman is intrigued by the absence of Hawkeye, until Mockingbird tells him that he became the new Swordsman. Shortly afterwards, the cosmic entity Oblivion summons Doorman. He declares that he could prove useful to him because of his connection to the Darkforce dimension, akin to Deathurge, who had been recently captured by Immortal. Doorman therefore replaces Deathurge and becomes Oblivion's new angel of death. After Mr. Immortal tricks Maelstrom into killing himself, Doorman takes him into the afterlife before returning to the GLA. As a servant of Oblivion, he is able to summon skis to fly and become intangible. Doorman continues to be a member of the GLA. Following his encounter with Maelstrom, Doorman understands the team's importance and has a newfound respect for them. After receiving a subpoena from the real Avengers and discovering that they are all mutants, the team decides to change their name to the Great Lakes X-Men, complete with new costumes.

During the GLX-Mas Special, the team confronts Dr. Tannenbaum, who has released an army of living Christmas trees on the citizens of Wisconsin. Later, Doorman informs the team that he had to go and visit his father. Upon reaching his father's house, his father quickly complains that DeMarr was throwing his life away and needed to join the real world. Realizing that his own happiness is more important than his father's respect, DeMarr finally admits the truth to his father: that he had died and came back as an angel of death. He had not come back to visit his father but rather to collect his soul, as he had fallen off the roof while setting up Christmas lights and died. The revelation of DeMarr's new role in the universe greatly pleases his father, who could not wait to brag to all his friends in heaven about how his son was the new angel of death.

In Avengers: The Initiative, Doorman is among the 142 members of the eponymous initiative. Doorman and his Initiative group are tasked with rescuing Dionysus, who has fallen from Mount Olympus and been captured by A.I.M. A.I.M. intends to use Dionysus to cause mental instability in every superhero they consider a threat. Deadpool ambushes Mr. Immortal and Flatman, who recruit him as a reserve member of the Initiative. However, Deadpool eventually overstays his welcome and is kicked out of the group by Squirrel Girl.

=== Great Lakes Avengers (2016) ===
In the ongoing series The Great Lakes Avengers, it is revealed that the team had disbanded and gone their separate ways. During that time, Doorman continued on his role as an angel of death. He meets with Flatman and Big Bertha at a local diner after being informed that the GLA has been reinstated as a permanent addition to the Avengers. The GLA relocate to Detroit, Michigan.

The team then goes to a local bar to try and convince the owner to turn down the music. The owner, Nain Rouge, refuses and begins to insult them, particularly Mr. Immortal and Big Bertha. After the GLA members are arrested, Doorman teleports out of prison and finds that Immortal has willingly buried himself inside a coffin. He brings Immortal back to the surface, convincing him to help the others. The GLA members are later released from prison with help from Connie Ferrari. Doorman is present when Goodness Silva joins the Great Lakes Avengers as Good Boy.

After the team discovers that Dick Snerd shut them down, Mr. Immortal returns and takes Flatman on patrol, while Bertha, Doorman, and Good Boy go to Nain Rouge's bar to find clues. Upon entering the bar, Doorman is pulled into the Darkforce, where Oblivion angrily demands an explanation for his absence.

Doorman receives gets a text from Bertha, who was injured while fighting Dr. Nod and his squad. During the battle, Nod transforms into a monstrous form after taking weight-loss supplements. Doorman and Mr. Immortal get inside Nod's body, where Immortal kills him by punching his heart. After their victory, the team is visited by Deadpool who tells them that they have been fired and can no longer use the Avengers name.

== Powers and abilities ==
Doorman has the ability to teleport people or objects through solid matter with his own body that serves as a portal of sorts. His mutant powers operate by tapping into the Darkforce dimension.

As the Angel of Death, he possesses mediumship, Darkforce constructs, light-speed flight, and supernatural durability.

== Other versions ==
An alternate version of Doorman appears in the "World War Hulk" storyline. He is one of the heroes who try to stop the Hulk during his rampage across Earth and witnesses his teammates being killed by the Hulk.

== In other media ==
- DeMarr Davis appears in Wonder Man, portrayed by Byron Bowers. This version is a struggling doorman who gained phasing powers after being exposed to toxic waste from a Roxxon container. After saving Josh Gad from a fire at the Wilcox Club, Davis becomes a successful actor under the nickname "Doorman" until he inadvertently sends Gad to another dimension while intoxicated. As a result, Davis is placed under lifetime surveillance by the Department of Damage Control to recover Gad. This also inspires the "Doorman Clause", which prohibits superhumans from acting in film and television roles.
- In 2011, HeroClix released a figure of Doorman.
