= The Laughing Mask =

The Laughing Mask may refer to:

- Laughing Mask, a Marvel Comics character
- The Laughing Mask (film), a 2014 independent horror film
