= The Amazing Spider-Man and Captain America in Dr. Doom's Revenge! =

1989 video game

- Developer: Paragon Software
- Publishers: EU: Empire Software/Medalist International; NA: Paragon Software Corporation
- Designer: Mark E. Seremet
- Programmers: Jim Boyd; Thomas J. Holmes; Andrew L. Miller; Mark E. Seremet
- Artists: Thomas J. Holmes; Jim Boyd; Ann Gruss; Lynn Helfferich; Steve M. Suhy; Jane Yeager
- Platforms: Amiga, Amstrad CPC, Atari ST, Commodore 64, MS-DOS, ZX Spectrum
- Release: 1989: C64, MS-DOS, Spectrum; 1990: Amiga, ST, CPC
- Genre: Fighting
- Mode: Single-player

The Amazing Spider-Man and Captain America in Dr. Doom's Revenge! is a fighting game developed by Paragon Software and published in 1989. It stars Marvel Comics' superheroes Spider-Man and Captain America battling a host of supervillains led by Doctor Doom. The player alternately controls Spider-Man and Captain America; the character being controlled switches after each battle.

== Characters ==
The game featured an assortment of Marvel Comics supervillains through the course of the game, many of whom are relatively minor characters in the comic books: Eduardo Lobo, Grey Gargoyle, Machete, Boomerang, Oddball, Electro, Hobgoblin, Rhino, Batroc the Leaper, Zaran, Rattan (who was created specifically for the game), and finally Doctor Doom himself. Among the bosses included is also the Hulk (later revealed to be an illusion by Mysterio). The game's manual provided biographies on each character in a style similar to the Official Handbook of the Marvel Universe, and information about each character was used as a form of copy protection.

== Plot ==
After his defeat by Spider-Man, Doctor Doom begins a nefarious revenge plot. Hiring several criminals to become his army, he tracks down and attacks Spider-Man. Spider-Man gets the help of Captain America and sets off to confront Doom, though their mission will be very perilous.

== Release ==
Marvel Comics also released a comic book that was only available in the game package. It illustrated the plot leading up to Spider-Man and Captain America's mission to stop Dr. Doom.

== Reception ==
Computer Gaming World gave Doctor Doom's Revenge a mixed review, praising the graphics but noting the game loaded and played very slowly. The review also noted the game was extremely linear, and the controls were unresponsive. Compute! liked the PC version's graphics and sound card audio, but the reviewer—a fan of Marvel Comics—stated that the story was not as thought-provoking as the source material. The magazine described the Commodore 64 version as "a perfect example of a great idea that just doesn't cut it ... the comics are more complex and thus more interesting", calling fights "disappointing" despite the "great" graphics.

In 1996, Computer Gaming World declared Spiderman/Captain America vs. Doctor Doom the 27th-worst computer game ever released.

== See also ==
- List of video games featuring Spider-Man
