= Mr. Immortal =

Publication information
- Publisher: Marvel Comics
- First appearance: The West Coast Avengers vol. 2 #46 (July 1989)
- Created by: John Byrne

In-story information
- Alter ego: Craig Hollis
- Species: Human Mutant
- Team affiliations: Great Lakes Avengers; Avengers Emergency Response Squad
- Abilities: Immortality via resurrection; Peak-level athlectism.

Mr. Immortal (Craig Hollis) is a fictional superhero appearing in American comic books published by Marvel Comics. He is the leader of the Great Lakes Avengers.

The character made his live-action debut in the Marvel Cinematic Universe (MCU) television series She-Hulk: Attorney at Law, played by David Pasquesi.

== Publication history ==
Created by John Byrne, he first appeared in The West Coast Avengers #46 (July 1989).

== Fictional character biography ==
The cosmic entity Deathurge first appeared to Craig Hollis shortly after his birth and the death of his mother, who made Deathurge promise that he would look after Craig. Craig became best friends with Deathurge, who was believed to be an imaginary friend and encouraged him into dangerous behavior, such as playing in traffic. On Craig's eighth birthday, Deathurge goaded him into setting his house on fire, which killed his father. Deathurge stopped visiting Craig afterwards, and Craig was moved into a new home. His foster father, Mr. O'Doughan, was an abusive man, though Craig became close to his foster sister, Terri, the two eventually falling in love as adults. This ended with Terri's suicide, prompting the return of Deathurge. The grief-stricken Craig begged Deathurge to take him as well as Terri, but Deathurge refused and left. Craig attempted to kill himself by jumping off a building, only to discover that he was immortal.

With this ability, he takes on the codename Mr. Immortal. In his first outing as a superhero, trying to foil a bank robbery, Immortal is shot and left for dead. He decides that forming a team will allow him to apply his abilities more usefully. After placing an ad, he founds the Great Lakes Avengers, a regional offshoot of the Avengers based in Milwaukee, Wisconsin, with himself as leader. Its other founding members include Flatman, Doorman, Big Bertha, Dinah Soar, and Leather Boy. Although he is given to fits of rage upon regaining consciousness following otherwise-fatal injuries, Dinah Soar is able to calm him with her vocalizations. Due to his immortality, Immortal is willing to take on life-endangering stunts and missions.

Over time, Mr. Immortal develops a loving relationship with Dinah Soar. During the Great Lakes Avengers' battle against Maelstrom, Dinah is killed and Deathurge appears to take her away to the afterlife, terminating his and Immortal's friendship. Immortal encounters Deathurge again at Dinah's funeral, where Deathurge expresses regret and states that he had come to care for Immortal like a son. Immortal is enraged at Deathurge for taking away everything that he cared for and attacks him to no avail. Immortal falls into a deep depression, repeatedly getting drunk and killing himself inside the GLA's headquarters.

After Leather Boy betrays the GLA and kills Monkey Joe, Deathurge appears to take him to the afterlife. Deathurge reveals to Immortal that he is intended to live until the end of the universe, then learn the grand secret that will reveal itself at the end of things. Immortal is revealed to be neither a human nor a mutant, but rather Homo supreme: a being that has evolved past death itself, making him the ultimate human. Deathurge had tried to prepare Immortal so that he could truly live to that destiny by taking away his loved ones. This gives Immortal a new incentive to live, and he sets out to stop Maelstrom from destroying the universe.

While battling Maelstrom, Mr. Immortal tricks him into killing himself. The GLA gain no recognition and are forced to cease using the Avengers name. After discovering that they are all mutants, the team decides to change their name to the Great Lakes X-Men, and adopt new costumes. However, they are discouraged from using the name of the X-Men and rename themselves the Great Lakes Champions.

Doorman, who had been killed during the battle with Maelstrom, replaces Deathurge as Oblivion's servant and the angel of death. Deathurge attempts to kill Squirrel Girl's squirrel Tippy-Toe as part of a test given to him by Oblivion to regain his job, but is thwarted by Mr. Immortal.

Following the 2006 storyline "Civil War", all of the Great Lakes Champions register with the United States government as required by the Superhuman Registration Act. Deadpool mistakenly attempts to apprehend them for violating the Act, only to be informed that they had already registered.

Mr. Immortal and his teammates are designated the Initiative group for Wisconsin, for which they are dubbed the Great Lakes Initiative. They are tasked with rescuing Dionysus after he falls from Mount Olympus and is captured by A.I.M., who plans to use his powers to cause mental instability in every superhero they consider a threat. During the task, Deadpool, who had been recruited as a reserve member by Flatman, ambushes him and Immortal, and dispatches others who attempt to evict him from the team's headquarters. Immortal helps kick Deadpool out by simply living far into the future. He encounters a time-traveling Squirrel Girl and convinces her to return to the past and evict Deadpool.

In the series The Great Lakes Avengers, it is revealed that the team had disbanded. Flatman receives a visit from Connie Ferrari, a lawyer representing the real Avengers, who informs him that the GLA has been reinstated as a permanent addition to the Avengers. Flatman reunites with Big Bertha and Doorman, though Mr. Immortal and Squirrel Girl are unreachable. While the team relocates to Detroit, Michigan and arrive at their new headquarters, it is revealed that Immortal had been buried alive at a cemetery to deal with his drinking problem. Immortal is retrieved by Doorman and taken to help the other Great Lakes Avengers, who have been arrested after a bar fight.

While fixing the Flatmobile, Immortal and Flatman receive a text message from Bertha, who was injured while fighting Dr. Nod and his squad. During the battle, Nod transforms into a larger monstrous state after taking weight-loss supplements. Doorman and Immortal get inside Nod's body, then kill him by punching his heart. After their victory, the team is visited by Deadpool, who tells them that they have been fired and can no longer use the Avengers name.

== Powers and abilities ==
Mr. Immortal is a mutant with the power of immortality, which allows his body to regenerate from any injury, including ones that would kill ordinary humans. Although injuries that are sufficiently traumatic appear to kill him at least initially, his regenerative power causes him to return to life in anywhere from ten minutes to seconds. This rapid healing manifests itself only in response to nominally fatal injuries: when non-fatally injured, he heals at a normal human rate, though such injuries tend to rapidly heal the next time he dies. This ability seems to be unconscious, since he has tried to die by suicide on numerous occasions, only to walk away unscathed afterwards. He has recovered from being shot, suffocated, stabbed, drowned, crushed, starved, dehydrated, exploded, poisoned, decapitated, irradiated, and incinerated. Upon revival, he is often extremely enraged, due to the pain of death. During Dinah Soar's tenure as his teammate, she could utter a vocalization, inaudible to humans, that could bring him out of this state, which Flatman speculated is hypersonic in nature. After having reached maturity, Mr. Immortal's body no longer ages. Deathurge stated to Immortal that he is a mutant, but not Homo sapiens superior, the more familiar subspecies of mutant who were the next step in evolution. He is the final step in human evolution: a man who has evolved past death itself, and is therefore Homo sapiens supreme. Immortal will live until the end of the universe and learn its final secret.

== In other media ==
- Mr. Immortal was set to appear in New Warriors, portrayed by Derek Theler, before the series was shelved.
- Mr. Immortal appears in the She-Hulk: Attorney at Law episode "Just Jen", portrayed by David Pasquesi. This version is an older gentleman who has had a history of ducking out of relationships by faking his death. He is ultimately forced to pay off all his exes, which he is able to cover financially due to his longevity allowing him to make wealthy investments.

== See also ==
- Comic book death
