= Zaran =

Zaran is the name of two separate supervillains appearing in American comic books published by Marvel Comics.

== Maximillian Zaran ==
Zaran

Publication information
- Publisher: Marvel Comics
- First appearance: Master of Kung Fu (2nd series) #77 (June 1979)
- Created by: Mike Zeck

In-story information
- Alter ego: Maximillian Zaran
- Team affiliations: Batroc's Brigade; MI-6; Thunderbolts
- Notable aliases: The Weapons Master
- Abilities: Expert armed/unarmed combatant Extensive knowledge of weapons

=== Fictional character biography ===
Maximillian Zaran was born in Great Britain. Early in his life, he was an agent of the British Secret Service: MI-6, but soon chose to become a mercenary and assassin. Training himself thoroughly in martial arts and the use of various kinds of weapons, he became known as a super-villain as well. He was first employed by Sarsfield and then Fah Lo Suee, and his first battle against a super-hero was against Shang-Chi, the Master of Kung-Fu, who easily defeated him. He later battled and defeated Shang-Chi. Zaran then joined Batroc's Brigade, and was employed by Obadiah Stane to steal Captain America's shield.

In his next attempt to defeat super-heroes, Zaran joined forces with Razor Fist and Shockwave and fought the West Coast Avengers Hawkeye, Mockingbird, and Iron Man. He battled Hawkeye again alongside Batroc's Brigade.

During the Bloodstone Hunt, Zaran became good friends with fellow mercenary Batroc. Batroc's Brigade was employed by Baron Zemo to acquire the fragments of the Bloodstone, and Zaran fought Captain America and Diamondback but lost once more. The brigade was later hired by Maelstrom to help him build a device that could destroy the universe and battled the Great Lakes Avengers, during which he killed the newly initiated G.L.A. member Grasshopper.

Zaran met Shang-Chi again in the Game of Rings, being defeated by him and the Cat.

=== Powers and abilities ===
Zaran is an athletic man with no superhuman powers. He received British Secret Service training, and has knowledge of all forms of armed and unarmed combat, and extensive knowledge of ancient and modern weapons, including knives, bows, staffs, maces, spears, nunchakus, shuriken, and guns. He wears a leather outfitted with a variety of specialized clips, loops, and pockets for carrying weapons. He usually carries small sais (three pronged daggers) attached to his gauntlets, collar and codpiece, a bo staff/spear/blow gun, and a wide variety of weapons as needed.

== Zhou Man She ==
Zaran II

Publication information
- Publisher: Marvel Comics
- First appearance: Master of Kung Fu: Bleeding Black #1 (1990)
- Created by: Doug Moench; Paul Gulacy

In-story information
- Alter ego: Zhou Man She
- Notable aliases: Master of the Staff and Sais
- Abilities: Possesses various weapons

=== Fictional character biography ===
The second Zaran is Zhou Man She, he was trained by the original Zaran to become a mercenary. He was defeated by Shang-Chi in battle.

Zaran was hired by Shadow-Hand (Li Chun) to retrieve Fu Manchu's reliquary, an artifact that supposedly contained a map to the Elixir Vitae. During this mission, he faced Clive Reston, Black Jack Tarr, and Shang-Chi. Later, a revived Manchu sent his dacoits to aid Zaran against Shang-Chi and the Marvel Knights. Although they succeeded in destroying the building that Shang-Chi was in, Zaran failed to slay him.

During the events of Secret Wars, Zaran was captured by Emila Vachon and brainwashed into assuming the identity of Mr. Muscatel. He was freed when Misty Knight and Colleen Wing deactivated the mind control.

== Other versions ==
An alternate universe variant of Zaran from Earth-58163 appears in House of M as a member of Shang-Chi's Dragons criminal organization who is later killed by Bullseye.

== In other media ==
Maximilian Zaran appears in The Amazing Spider-Man and Captain America in Dr. Doom's Revenge!.
