= Machete (comics) =

Publication information
- Publisher: Marvel Comics
- First appearance: Captain America #302 (Feb. 1985)
- Created by: Mike Carlin; Paul Neary

In-story information
- Alter ego: Ferdinand Lopez
- Team affiliations: Batroc's Brigade
- Abilities: Expert with bladed and throwing weapons Experienced tactician Wears Kevlar flak jacket Possesses various weapons

Machete (Ferdinand Lopez) is a fictional character appearing in American comic books published by Marvel Comics. The character has been a member of Batroc's Brigade and Doom's Brigade. He was also a former revolutionary of San Diablo in South America.

== Publication history ==
Machete first appeared in Captain America #302 (February 1985), and was created by Mike Carlin and Paul Neary.

== Fictional character biography ==
Fernando Lopez was born in the country of San Diablo. He became a revolutionary, and later a mercenary, joining Batroc's Brigade. Machete was employed by Helmut Zemo and the Brigade to steal the skeleton of Ulysses Bloodstone. Machete traveled to the Amazon with Batroc's Brigade, and was captured by Incas. Machete battled the Incas alongside Batroc's Brigade, Zemo, Captain America, and Diamondback. Machete traveled to the Bermuda Triangle, where he battled Captain America again. He traveled to Egypt alongside Batroc's Brigade in search of the Bloodstone fragment. He was later reportedly killed by Zeitgeist.

Fernando's brothers, Alfonso and Mariano Lopez, have also each briefly taken on the role.

== Powers and abilities ==
Fernando Lopez is an athletic man with no superhuman powers. He is an expert with bladed weapons and the throwing of such weapons. For instance, when he attacked Captain America with the intent of stealing his shield, Machete was able to specifically destroy the superhero's shield's internal holding straps while he was wielding it by them in combat, which made the shield much more cumbersome for Captain America to use. He has extensive knowledge of guerilla warfare tactics.

Machete wore a bulletproof Kevlar flak jacket with a variety of pockets and pouches for carrying various weapons, particularly throwing-knives. He wore custom-made combat boots with additional weapons pouches; the remainder of his costume consisted of conventional military surplus items. Machete carried a variety of specially manufactured weighted steel throwing knives, two three-foot machetes, and other items as necessary. Additionally, his costume's gloves were equipped with strong electromagnets to help him retrieve his weapons in case he was disarmed.

== Other versions ==
An alternate universe version of Machete appears in House of M as a member of Shang-Chi's Dragons criminal organization.

== In other media ==
Machete appears in The Amazing Spider-Man and Captain America in Dr. Doom's Revenge!.
