= Anil Prasad =

American music critic

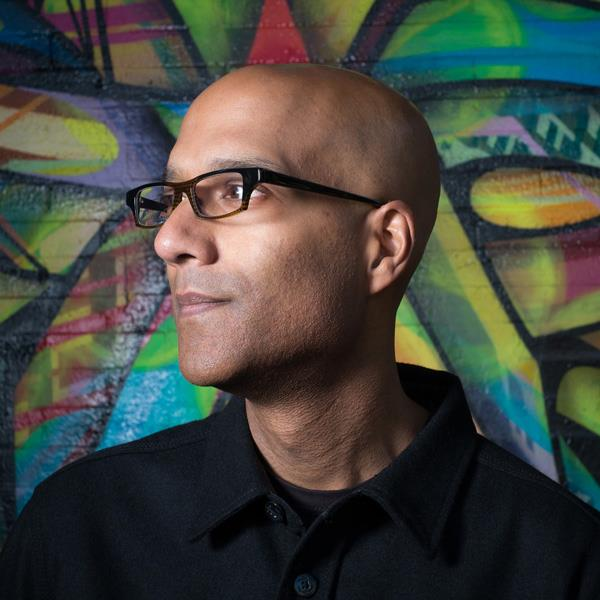
- Anil Prasad of Innerviews
- Occupation: Music journalist
- Writing career
- Period: 1992-present
- Genres: Music interviews, Music industry analysis
- Notable work: Innerviews: Music Without Borders
- Website: www.innerviews.org

Anil Prasad is a music journalist and music industry commentator.

== Career ==
Prasad is the founder and editor of Innerviews, the Internet's first online music magazine, initially launched in 1994. Prasad's writing has also appeared in Guitar Player, Bass Player, Frets, SF Gate, JazzTimes, Relix, All About Jazz, and the CBC. He has conducted interviews with more than 1,200 musicians since 1992.

Prasad has contributed liner notes, essays, video interviews, and release consulting to projects for record labels including Blue Note, Cherry Red, Favored Nations, Frontiers, Kscope, Panegyric, 7d Media, and Universal, as well as artists such as Pierre Bensusan, The Crimson ProjeKCt, Howard Jones, Pete Levin, Tony Levin, Pat Mastelotto, John McLaughlin, The Northern Pikes, Markus Reuter, Sonar, Tanya Tagaq, David Torn, Us3, Alan White, Steven Wilson, and Yes.

Prasad is the author of the book Innerviews: Music Without Borders. The eBook edition achieved a #1 placement on iTunes’ Arts & Entertainment and Music charts. The book features interviews with 24 musicians, including Björk, Stanley Clarke, Ani DiFranco, Béla Fleck, Bill Laswell, John McLaughlin, Public Enemy, David Sylvian, and Tangerine Dream.

Prasad is an outspoken critic of many music industry practices, most notably Internet streaming vendor policies. Prasad has also criticized recording contracts, in particular copyright and master ownership clauses, and is an advocate of artists retaining the entirety of copyright in their own works.
