= The Laughing Mask (film) =

2014 horror film

- Theatrical release poster
- Directed by: Michael Aguiar
- Written by: Michael Aguiar
- Produced by: Gabriel Lee; David Lopez
- Starring: John Hardy; Jeffrey Gwyn Jenkins
- Cinematography: William Schweikert
- Edited by: Michael Aguiar; Kyle Fritsche; David Lopez
- Music by: Richard Giaimo; Gregg Rossetti
- Production companies: Bravestarr Pictures; Pendragon Productions
- Distributed by: Leomark Studios
- Release date: October 31, 2014 (United States)
- Running time: 101 minutes
- Country: United States
- Language: English

The Laughing Mask is a 2014 American independent horror film written and directed by Michael Aguiar and is his feature film directorial debut. It was released on October 31, 2014, and stars John Hardy as a man who must face down the serial killer known only as "Laughing Mask", who murdered John's family.

== Plot ==
Jake Johnson is a man with a mission. His wife Jaycee was murdered by the brutal serial killer named the Laughing Mask years ago and he's determined to bring the man to justice. He's not the only one who wants to end the Laughing Mask's reign of terror, as the police have set Kate on the case. However, as the film progresses more and more people fall victim to the Laughing Mask, some of whom have been murdered in ways that resemble crimes that the victims purportedly committed.

== Cast ==
- John Hardy as Jake Johnson
- Jeffrey Gwyn Jenkins as The Laughing Mask
- Sheyenne Rivers as Kate
- Inge Uys as Jaycee Johnson
- Gabriel Lee as Detective Cordova
- Floyd Adams as Pig Man
- Arisia Aguiar as Barbara Johnson
- Jade Aguiar as Nancy Johnson
- Bill Asbury as Rancor Member
- Laura Bush as Planner
- Liz M. Day as Chief Maria Mendoza
- Manny Dortanieves as Groundskeeper
- Anthony Giovanni Elias as Wink
- Flavia Falquetti as Barista
- Matt Ganey as Lloyd Grant
- Brent 'Clutch' Gaubatz as Cole Masters
- Wayne Earle Kinney as Cash
- Trina Christine Mason as Mermaid Woman

== Release ==
=== Home media ===
The Laughing Mask was released on DVD by Leomark Studios on July 16, 2016.

== Reception ==
The Laughing Mask received mostly positive reviews, with many outlets praising Aguiar for the usage of vintage music and animation clips while also criticizing it for feeling disjointed. Starburst and HorrorNews.net both panned The Laughing Mask, as Starburst felt that it was "a film that doesn’t really do anything right. You may laugh but it won’t have been because of anything intentional." HorrorNews.net commented that they enjoyed the film's music, villain, and foundational story, but that "the way the film tells the story is uneven, including seemingly unnecessary scenes while at the same time, leaving out key plot information."

Dread Central gave the film a rating of 3.5/5 stars, writing "With a fantastic-looking presentation and even better instances of gratuitous violence, the movie treads back to the fun days of cut-em-up flicks, and Aguiar looks as if he paid some serious attention to detail with the crafting on this one." Bloody Disgusting gave The Laughing Mask three out of five skulls, saying "in spite of the minor technical missteps and the editing shortcomings, The Laughing Mask definitely deserves attention for the inventive melding of classic slashers and cop drama, as well as some brutal and inventive kills."
