= Great Lakes Avengers =

Fictional comic book heroes

- The Great Lakes Avengers as seen on the cover of West Coast Avengers #46 (July 1989)

Publication information
- Publisher: Marvel Comics
- First appearance: West Coast Avengers #46 (July 1989)
- Created by: John Byrne

In-story information
- Base(s): GLA Headquarters in Milwaukee, Wisconsin
- Member(s): See below

The Great Lakes Avengers (also known as The Lightning Rods, The Great Lakes X-Men, The Great Lakes Champions, and The Great Lakes Initiative) are a fictional superhero team appearing in American comic books published by Marvel Comics. The characters were introduced in West Coast Avengers #46 (July 1989), and were created by John Byrne.

== Publication history ==
The team first appeared in West Coast Avengers vol. 2 #46 and then made appearances in issues #48–49 and #64, and a cameo appearance in Avengers West Coast Annual #6. The GLA also make an appearance in issue #309 of Avengers and in the 1990 Avengers Annual. This was followed by appearances in issues #15–17 and #25 of Thunderbolts and issues #10–11 and #61 of Deadpool.

In 2005, the GLA were featured in a self-titled, four-issue mini-series (written by Dan Slott) and the one-shot, GLX-Mas Special. This was followed in 2006 by a minor appearance in I ♥ Marvel: Masked Intentions, The Thing vol. 2, #8, and Cable and Deadpool #30. In 2007, the team was featured in the one-shot Deadpool/GLI Summer Fun Spectacular. The team also made cameo appearances in issues #19 and #25 of Avengers: The Initiative and a minor appearance in issue #3 of Age of Heroes. In 2011, the team made an appearance in issue #6 of Fear Itself: The Home Front.

A new volume and ongoing series of the team debuted in 2016 from writer Zac Gorman and artist Will Robson. Seven issues were published for this series before ending. Since then, the team and its associated cast have made minor appearances in other Marvel comics.

== Fictional team biography ==
=== GLA: Misassembled ===
Craig Hollis discovers that he is immortal after being shot by a group of thieves and left for dead, and he decides to fight crime as Mr. Immortal. He realizes that operating alone may not be feasible. He places an advertisement for costumed adventurers in the local newspaper in his home town of Milwaukee, and assembles the Great Lakes Avengers, recruiting Dinah Soar, Big Bertha, Flatman, and Doorman. Immortal refuses one candidate, Gene Lorrene, a leather fetishist calling himself Leather Boy. Turned down because he has no superpowers and is therefore ineligible, Lorrene takes the rejection personally. (Note: Seen in a flashback in GLA: Misassembled #1–4 (2005)) The team is first seen in public by Avengers members Hawkeye and Mockingbird, who agree to become their mentors.

After a period of inactivity, the team learns that the West Coast Avengers have disbanded and that Hawkeye has been killed. The team subsequently battle Maelstrom, who is building a doomsday device. During this encounter, Dinah Soar is killed. New members Squirrel Girl, her squirrel Monkey Joe, and Grasshopper are then recruited. Although Maelstrom is defeated via Mr. Immortal's trickery, Doorman, Grasshopper and Monkey Joe are killed. Following Monkey Joe's death, Squirrel Girl acquires a new partner, a female squirrel called Tippy-Toe. Doorman is resurrected by Oblivion and becomes an "angel of death" charged with conveying the souls of the dead to the afterlife.

=== Crossovers ===
After receiving a subpoena from the Avengers and discovering that they are all mutants, the team decides to rename themselves the Great Lakes X-Men. However, Marvel Girl demands that they drop the "X-Men" name, resulting in the team rebranding once more as the name Great Lakes Champions (GLC).

With the beginning of the Civil War storyline, the GLC comply with the Superhuman Registration Act and are renamed the Great Lakes Initiative (GLI). Deadpool is granted reserve membership on the team, but is evicted after proving to be too much of an annoyance. When Norman Osborn assumes control of the Initiative, he transfers Gravity to a leadership role in the GLI. During the Fear Itself storyline, the team reverts to the name Great Lakes Avengers.

=== All-New, All Different ===
It is revealed that the team had disbanded and gone their separate ways. Flatman receives a visit from Connie Ferrari, a lawyer representing the real Avengers, who informs him that the GLA has been reinstated as a permanent addition to the Avengers. Flatman reunites with Big Bertha and Doorman, though Mr. Immortal does not show up and Squirrel Girl apparently ignores Flatman's call. The team moves to a new headquarters, a factory owned by Tony Stark in Detroit, Michigan. They are visited by Deadpool, who tells them that they have been fired and can no longer use the Avengers name.

== Members ==
=== Founders ===
Character	Real Name	Joined in	Notes
Mr. Immortal	Craig Hollis	West Coast Avengers #46 (vol. 2, Jul. 1989)	Current leader of the team. Possesses immortality.
Dinah Soar	Unknown	West Coast Avengers #46 (vol. 2, Jul. 1989)	Possesses flight, sonic scream, and longevity. Killed by Maelstrom in GLA #1.
Big Bertha	Ashley Crawford	West Coast Avengers #46 (vol. 2, Jul. 1989)	Active in the GLA. Possesses size and mass alteration.
Flatman	Val Ventura (alias)	West Coast Avengers #46 (vol. 2, Jul. 1989)	Active in the GLA. His flat body grants him elasticity and shapeshifting.
Doorman	DeMarr Davis	West Coast Avengers #46 (vol. 2, Jul. 1989)	Active in the GLA. He possesses Darkforce-based teleportation.

=== Trainers ===
Assisted the team by training them, but it is not clear if they joined.

Character	Real Name	Joined in	Notes
Hawkeye	Clinton Francis Barton	West Coast Avengers #46 (July 1989)	Currently leader of the Occupy Avengers.
Mockingbird	Bobbi Morse-Barton	West Coast Avengers #46 (July 1989)	Currently a member of S.H.I.E.L.D.

=== Recruits ===
Character	Real Name	Joined in	Notes
Squirrel Girl	Doreen Green	GLA #2 (July 2005)	Possesses squirrel-based powers. Left the team because she felt they were relying too much on her, thus keeping them from reaching their own potential.
Monkey Joe		GLA #2 (July 2005)	Joined the team along with Squirrel Girl, but was killed by Leather Boy in a fit of jealousy.
Grasshopper	Doug Taggert	GLA #2 (July 2005)	Wears the Grasshopper suit that grants him leaping abilities. Killed soon after joining.
Tippy-Toe		GLA #4	Squirrel Girl's current squirrel partner. Left the team with Squirrel Girl.
Grasshopper	Neil Shelton	GLX-Mas Special	Wears the same armor. Unknown if he had any relation to the GLA. Killed when he accidentally propelled himself into space.
Deadpool	Wade Wilson	Deadpool-GLI Summer Fun Spectacular #1 (September 2007)	Given reserve membership with the team until he was kicked out by Squirrel Girl.
Grasshopper	Unknown	Deadpool-GLI Summer Fun Spectacular #1 (September 2007)	Wears the same armor. Murdered by Deadpool.
Gravity	Gregory Willis	Avengers: The Initiative #25 (August 2009)	Left shortly afterward, never seen in action with the team.
Good Boy	Goodness Silva	The Great Lakes Avengers Vol. 2 #1	Can assume a werewolf-like form. Inducted as a member simply so she would not be prosecuted by authorities. Seemingly active in the GLA.
Grasshopper	Unknown	Fantastic Four Vol. 6 #43	Wears the same armor. First Grasshopper to survive a battle with the team. He has not appeared since.

== False members ==
Character	Real Name	Joined in	Notes
Leather Boy	Gene Lorrene	GLA #1 (June 2005)	Applied upon founding, but considered ineligible for membership upon not having powers.
Grasshopper	Unknown	Avengers: Initiative #19 (December 2008)	Revealed to be a Skrull infiltrator and was killed by the Great Lakes Initiative.

== Enemies ==
The following have fought the Great Lakes Avengers:

- A.I.M. –
- Batroc's Brigade – A group led by Batroc the Leaper.
- Cormorant – A slave fighter for the Reckoning, Cormorant attacked the Great Lakes Avengers during the events of "Reckoning War".
- Doctor Nod – A scientist who planned to create the ultimate beauty product using genetic material from Big Bertha.
- Dr. Tannenbaum – A terrorist bent on destroying Christmas.
- Firebrand – The sixth Firebrand who was hired by Nain Rogue.
- Leather Boy – As mentioned above, Leather Boy tried to apply for membership to the Great Lakes Avengers and was rejected because he had no powers. Leather Boy later attempted several revenge plots on the group.
- Maelstrom – A Deviant/Inhuman hybrid.
- Nain Rogue – Dick Snerd is a councilman wearing a monstrous mask who targeted the slums of Detroit.
- Pitchfork – A villain with a cylinder-shaped head and pitchforks for hands who was hired by Nain Rogue.
- Shriek – She was once hired by Nain Rogue.

== In other media ==
The Great Lakes Avengers are referenced in a self-titled song released by Kirby Krackle in their 2010 album E For Everyone.

== Reception ==
In August 2009, Time listed the Great Lakes Avengers among the "Top 10 Oddest Marvel Characters".

== Collected editions ==
Title	Material collected	Publication Date	ISBN
G.L.A.: Misassembled	G.L.A. #1–4, West Coast Avengers #46, material from Marvel Super-Heroes #8	December 2005	978-0785116219
The Unbeatable Squirrel Girl & the Great Lakes Avengers	G.L.A. #1–4, GLX-Mas Special, Thing (vol. 2) #8, Cable & Deadpool #30, Deadpool/GLI Summer Fun Spectacular; material from Marvel Super-Heroes #8, I Heart Marvel: Masked Intentions, Age of Heroes #3, I am An Avenger #1	August 2016	978-1302900663
Great Lakes Avengers: Same Old, Same Old	Great Lakes Avengers #1–7	May 2017	978-1302906214
