= List of Marvel Comics characters: L =

== La Bandera ==
La Bandera is a young mutant with the power to influence groups of people to do whatever she wills. Additionally, La Bandera can fire energy blasts from her staff, the potency of which is determined by the number of people she is "inspiring" at the time. La Bandera is later reportedly slain by Zeitgeist.

== Lactuca the Knower ==
Lactuca the Knower is a character appearing in American comic books published by Marvel Comics. She first appeared in Planet-Size X-Men #1 (August 2021), created by Gerry Duggan and Pepe Larraz.

Lactuca is a mutant from Arakko and a member of the Great Ring of Arakko, acting as a consultant on all matters related to the heavens. She assisted in the relocation of Arakko to Mars. When Genesis returns to Arakko and confronts the Great Ring for their perceived weakness in their conflict with the Eternals, Lactuca is initially neutral until it becomes clear that Genesis and Annihilation were influencing other members of the Ring. In the interest of balance, Lactuca teleports Storm and her allies away. In the ensuing civil war, Lactuca remains neutral.

=== Powers and abilities of Lactuca the Knower ===
Lactuca is an Omega-level mutant and a "universal shaper", able to manipulate space and the universe on a large scale, including closing dimensional rifts and interfering with the teleportation powers of others. She is virtually omniscient, knowing the spatial position of everything and capable of perceiving reality through the perspectives of others. She is able to connect her mind with others' through eye contact, teleport herself and others, fly, increase her size, and conceal herself and others from perception.

== Lady Deadpool ==
Lady Deadpool

Publication information
- Publisher: Marvel Comics
- First appearance: Deadpool: Merc with a Mouth #7 (January 2010)
- Created by: Victor Gischler; Rob Liefeld

In-story information
- Alter ego: Wanda Wilson
- Species: Human mutant
- Team affiliations: Deadpool Corps
- Abilities: Superhuman strength, durability, and agility; Regenerative healing factor; Telepathic immunity

Lady Deadpool is a character from Marvel Comics. The character, created by Victor Gischler and Robert Liefeld, first appeared in Deadpool: Merc with a Mouth #7 (January 2010). She is depicted as a lone rebel, leading a resistance against a group of loyalists serving a fascist regime led by General America in Washington, D.C.

She is the female counterpart of Deadpool and a member of the Deadpool Corps. Hailing from an alternate universe (Earth-3010), her story unfolds in a dystopian reality where the United States is fractured and on the brink of collapse. In this world, Lady Deadpool navigates complex alliances and battles to thwart a rebellion, ultimately facing off against the cosmic entity Awareness, whose insatiable appetite for destruction threatens all existence.

=== Lady Deadpool in other media ===
- Lady Deadpool appears as a playable character in Marvel Heroes, voiced by Alanna Ubach.
- Ladypool appears in Deadpool & Wolverine, performed by Christiaan Bettridge and voiced by Blake Lively.
- Lady Deadpool appears in Marvel's Deadpool VR, voiced by Brina Palencia.

== Lady Hellbender ==
Lady Hellbender (Marguerite Hellbender) is a character appearing in American comic books published by Marvel Comics. She was created by Greg Pak and Frank Cho, first appearing in Totally Awesome Hulk #1 (December 2015).

Hellbender is an alien originating from the planet Seknarf Nine. As a child, she lived with her gambling-addicted father Fabian and her pet monster, Beez. However, her father sold Beez to pay off his gambling debts. Beez was forced into a gladiator arena and died in combat, traumatizing Hellbender, who was horrified and disgusted that her father had not only remorselessly done this to her beloved pet, but worse had bet against Beez to maximize his winnings.

As an adult, Hellbender travels the galaxy, hunting and capturing monsters to bring them to a sanctuary on Seknarf Nine. She comes into conflict with Amadeus Cho, who has also been battling monsters. When Amadeus defeats Fin Fang Foom, Hellbender captures him, believing him to be the strongest monster on Earth. Amadeus battles Hellbender's captive monsters before escaping. However, by defeating Foom, Hulk proved to be the strongest monster on the Earth, and Hellbender captured him.After Hulk broke free and escaped Hellbender's ship, she accepted his refusal to join her, although, as she was taking off in her ship, she reminded Hulk to call her if he changed his mind.

=== Lady Hellbender in other media ===
- Lady Hellbender appears in Marvel's Guardians of the Galaxy, voiced by Sarah Levesque.
- Lady Hellbender appears in Marvel Cosmic Invasion, voiced by Elysia Rotaru.

== Lady Lark ==
Lady Lark (Linda Lewis), later named Skylark, is a character appearing in American comic books published by Marvel Comics. She first appeared in Avengers #85 (February 1971), and was created by Roy Thomas and John Buscema. Lady Lark is based on the DC Comics characters Black Canary and Hawkgirl.

=== Earth-712 version ===
Linda Lewis was a singer before Doctor Decibel surgically implanted synthetic vocal cords into her throat, giving her the ability to generate a "sonic cry" which could incapacitate opponents. A reluctant hero at best, Linda often wished to return to her singing career.

She often partnered in crime-fighting, and later romantically, with the character Golden Archer (mirroring the relationship between the modern Black Canary and Green Arrow); however, she refused his marriage proposal. The Archer then used a mind-altering device to literally change her mind, but this had the unintended side effect of altering her personality to an air-headed, vapid persona that put her feelings for the Archer above all other priorities.

Following Golden Archer's death, Lady Lark shakes off the effects of the mental modification, and returns to active status with the Squadron. Feeling she needed to increase her abilities to stand beside teammates that she perceived as more powerful, she begins using the artificial wings that once belonged to deceased teammate Blue Eagle to gain the power of flight, and renames herself Skylark.

=== Earth-31916 version ===
An alternate version of Lady Lark appears in the Supreme Power: Hyperion mini-series.

== Lady Lotus ==
Lady Lotus

Publication information
- Publisher: Marvel Comics
- First appearance: The Invaders #37 (Feb. 1979).
- Created by: Don Glut; Rick Hoberg; Chic Stone; Alan Kupperberg

In-story information
- Species: Human mutant
- Place of origin: Japan
- Team affiliations: Super-Axis
- Partnerships: Yellow Claw
- Abilities: Mind control Illusion casting Limited precognition Slow aging Ability to hypnotize others from miles away and psychically project images into a crystal ball

Lady Lotus (also known as Lotus Newmark) is a supervillain appearing in American comic books published by Marvel Comics. Lady Lotus first appeared in The Invaders #37 (Feb. 1979), and was created by Don Glut, Rick Hoberg, Chic Stone and Alan Kupperberg.

Lady Lotus was born in Japan, and exhibited strong psychic powers at a young age. She developed these abilities through constant meditation, and supplemented her powers with the sacred lotus flower. At the age of 21, she moved to the United States. Following the Japanese attack on Pearl Harbor, the United States began holding Japanese-Americans in concentration camps to determine their loyalties. Disgusted by this, Lady Lotus took refuge in New York's Chinatown and opened a curio shop called "The House of Lotus". She cast a subtle hypnotic suggestion over anyone who came into the store, convincing her customers that she was actually Chinese. Angered at how her people were being treated by the Americans, she vowed to destroy the United States, and allied with the Axis Powers. Lotus becomes an enemy of the Invaders.

Lady Lotus possesses the ability to hypnotize others from miles away, forcing them to obey her will. She can also psychically project images into a crystal ball, cast mental illusions and had limited powers of precognition. Exposure to lotus flowers heightened her powers, and she would bathe for an hour in a bath of the flowers to increase her abilities. Due to apparent mystical means, she also does not age.

== Lady Shadra ==
Lady Shadra is an evolved humanoid black panther created by the High Evolutionary as one of his New Men, animals given humanoid form and intelligence. She was a member of her master's high guard, the Knights of Wundagore, and had her own squire named Gulo. Together they took part in the earliest battle against the Man-Beast after he ousted the Evolutionary from his own citadel, and later joined their creator on his journey into space.

== Lady Stilt-Man ==
Lady Stilt-Man (Callie Ryan) is a criminal inspired by Stilt-Man. Deadpool defeats her by removing a manhole cover, causing one of her legs to fall in, and her other to step onto a high heel attached to the top of a truck. She does not appear to be connected to any of the other Stilt-Men, and claims she is using the name as an "homage". This version is more clumsy and uncoordinated, and Spider-Man himself says she is "trying too hard."

In the "Villains for Hire" miniseries, Lady Stilt-Man reappears as a member of Misty Knight's villain subgroup for Heroes for Hire going by just "Stilt-Man". Lady Stilt-Man is later recruited by Max Fury to join the Masters of Evil.

== Lady Yulan ==
Lady Yulan was born in the Yuan dynasty and was raised from birth to be an assassin before she was turned into a vampire through Chinese alchemy. Yulan left China and spent the next centuries creating her own clandestine criminal empire called Clan Yulan, eventually establishing her own vampire territory in New York City by the present day. Moon Knight approaches her for information regarding the Tutor, a former vampire acquaintance of hers, which she obliges due to her hatred of the Tutor.

In the "Gang War" storyline, Lady Yulan is shown to have territories within East Village and the Lower East Side within New York's criminal underworld. When tensions between the criminal organizations escalates to a city-wide war, she engages in a turf war with Mister Negative due to the preexisting animosity between the two and the close proximity of their territories. The destruction wrought between the two forces Shang-Chi and the Five Weapons Society to intervene.

As a vampire created through alchemy, Lady Yulan is immune to aging and presumably possesses the same powers and weaknesses of other vampires.

== Adria Lafayette ==
Adria Lafayette is the mother of Lunella Lafayette. The character first appeared in Moon Girl and Devil Dinosaur #1 (2015), but was initially unnamed. She was named Adria in Moon Girl and Devil Dinosaur (vol. 2), a change inspired by her counterpart from the Moon Girl and Devil Dinosaur animated series.

=== Adria Lafayette in other media ===
Adria Lafayette appears in Moon Girl and Devil Dinosaur, voiced by Sasheer Zamata. This version is a social activist who works as a DJ in her family's roller-skating rink Roll With It.

== James Lafayette ==
James Lafayette is the father of Lunella Lafayette. The character first appeared in Moon Girl and Devil Dinosaur #1 (2015), but was initially unnamed. He was named James in Moon Girl and Devil Dinosaur (vol. 2), a change inspired by his counterpart from the Moon Girl and Devil Dinosaur animated series.

=== James Lafayette in other media ===
James Lafayette appears in Moon Girl and Devil Dinosaur, voiced by Jermaine Fowler. This version works as a clerk at his family's roller-skating rink Roll With It.

== Lamprey ==
Lamprey is a character appearing in American comic books published by Marvel Comics. The character appeared in the original Squadron Supreme series. He was initially created as a pastiche of the DC Comics supervillain Parasite.

Donald McGuiggin is a professional criminal and member of the criminal group called the Institute of Evil on the Squadron's alternate Earth. He has the power to drain energy from other living beings and duplicate their superhuman powers. Lamprey is one of the Institute members captured by the Squadron and subjected to the Behavior Modification process invented by Squadron member Tom Thumb, altering his personality. He joins the Squadron and aids them in their efforts to conquer the world in order to turn it into a utopia.

Nighthawk's Redeemers enter an all-out battle against the remaining Squadron members at Squadron City. During this battle, Lamprey tries to absorb the power of Doctor Spectrum, but is overwhelmed by energy and dies.

== David Langford ==
Dr. David Langford is a character appearing in American comic books published by Marvel Comics. Created by Len Kaminski and Ron Wagner, he first appeared in Morbius: The Living Vampire #1 (September 1992).

A business partner to Doctor Paine, he worked to create Morbius' experimental blood disease cure which backfired (which is partially due to the Lilin Fang on Lilith's behalf and later turned into Bloodthrist) and killed Martine Bancroft to cover his actions, but was ultimately killed by Morbius out of vengeance.

== Lasher ==
Lasher is the name used by a symbiote in Marvel Comics. The symbiote, created by David Michelinie and Ron Lim, first appeared in Venom: Lethal Protector #4 (May 1993), and was named by a Planet of the Symbiotes action figure, before being canonized in Carnage, U.S.A. #2 (March 2012). It was created as one of five symbiote "children" forcefully spawned from the Venom symbiote along with Riot, Agony, Phage and Scream. Lasher is usually depicted as a green symbiote with four tendrils which protrude from its back.

=== Ramon Hernandez ===
Lasher's first host was Ramon Hernandez, a mercenary hired by Carlton Drake's Life Foundation in San Francisco. Hernandez bonded with Lasher in conjunction with Scream (Donna Diego), Agony (Leslie Gesneria), Riot (Trevor Cole) and Phage (Carl Mach). Lasher and his "siblings" are defeated by Spider-Man and Venom. They kidnap Eddie Brock in an attempt to communicate with their symbiotes in Chicago. When Brock refuses to aid them, Hernandez is killed by Diego, who developed schizophrenia due to Scream's influence.

=== Marcus Simms ===
Lasher's second host was Marcus Simms, a Lieutenant assigned to the Mercury Team. While Cletus Kasady is on the loose in Colorado, Marcus trains with Lasher in specific tasks alongside Riot (Howard Odgen), Phage (Rico Axelson) and Agony (James Murphy). Simms and his teammates are later killed by Carnage in their secret base, and the four symbiotes bond with Mercury Team's dog.

=== Sadie ===
After being possessed by Knull, the four symbiotes possess a bickering family, with Lasher taking the daughter Sadie. The four head to New York to help Carnage and hunt Dylan Brock and Normie Osborn, but are defeated and separated from their respective hosts by the Maker.

=== William ===
Lasher's fourth host is William, a senile and elderly individual. Manipulated by the Carnage symbiote, William is subsequently killed while Lasher takes a fifth host to help the symbiote enforcers participate in a conspiracy involving the Friends of Humanity. Nevertheless, they are defeated by Flash Thompson, Silence and Toxin and taken into Alchemax's custody.

=== Lasher in other media ===
- The Ramon Hernandez incarnation of Lasher appears as a boss in Spider-Man and Venom: Separation Anxiety.
- The Ramon Hernandez incarnation of Lasher appears as a playable character in Spider-Man Unlimited.
- The Lasher symbiote and a variation of the Sadie incarnation of Lasher appear in Venom: The Last Dance, portrayed by Clark Backo.
- The Ramon Hernandez incarnation of Lasher appears as a card in Marvel Snap.
- The Sadie Christmas incarnation of She-Venom appears as a playable skin in Fortnite.

== Petra Laskov ==
Petra Laskov is a Syrian female mutant, and the wife of Georgian activist Nikolai Laskov. She was held at gunpoint and forced to kill Nikolai; nonetheless, their child was killed. Years later, she becomes Swarm (aka Insect Queen), a supervillain member of the Liberators group, which invades the United States to kill many to put a stop to perceived American aggression. A showdown with the Ultimates resulted in Laskov being defeated by the Wasp. She returns as the Red Wasp, a superheroine member of the Avengers led by Nick Fury and Gregory Stark.

=== Powers and abilities of Petra Laskov ===
Petra Laskov is able to control insects as Swarm, and her abilities as the Red Wasp are an aggressive variation of the Wasp.

== Laufey ==
Laufey is a supervillain appearing in American comic books published by Marvel Comics. The character is depicted usually as an enemy of the Asgardian king Odin, father of Thor. He is the King of the Frost Giants and the biological father of Thor's adopted brother and archenemy, Loki. Created by writer Stan Lee and artist Jack Kirby, he first appeared in Journey into Mystery #112 (January 1965), and was based on the deity of the same name.

In his original depiction, Laufey was killed in battle by Odin; it was later retroactively established that he was killed by a time-traveling Loki. In the present day, Laufey is resurrected by Minotaur. In the storyline "The War of the Realms", Laufey is killed by Loki after attempting to kill Frigga, Odin's wife.

=== Laufey in other media ===
- Laufey appears in the Hulk and the Agents of S.M.A.S.H. episode "Hulks on Ice", voiced by Enn Reitel.
- Laufey appears in Thor, portrayed by Colm Feore. This version came into conflict with Odin while seeking a new home for the Frost Giants, invading Earth in the process. Laufey was defeated and agreed to a truce with the Asgardians. In the present, Laufey breaks the truce and allies with Loki, who later betrays and kills him.
  - Alternate universe versions of Laufey appear in What If...?, voiced by Andrew Morgado.
- Laufey appears in Lego Marvel Super Heroes, voiced by John DiMaggio.
- Laufey appears in Lego Marvel's Avengers.
- Laufey appears in Marvel Future Revolution.

== Laughing Mask ==
The Laughing Mask (Dennis Burton) is a character appearing in American comic books published by Marvel Comics. The character is a Timely Comics Golden Age superhero which appeared in Daring Mystery Comics #2, 1940, and reappeared in The Twelve.

Dennis Burton was a deputy district attorney who took to murdering criminals in the vein of Marvel's later Punisher, although the Laughing Mask used a phosphorescent mask to scare his victims prior to killing them. For unknown reasons he became the Purple Mask (Daring Mystery Comics #3–4) and was the cover feature on Daring Mystery Comics #3. The first Purple Mask story was reprinted in Daring Mystery 70th Anniversary Special.

Michael J. Vasallo identifies the Falcon (appearing in Daring Mystery Comics #5–6) as a revamp of The Purple Mask. That character was also a deputy district attorney, but his name was Carl Burgess and was, in terms of continuity, a distinct character. The Falcon appeared on the cover of Daring Mystery Comics #5. The Falcon did not kills his foes per se, but he allowed them to be killed by their own actions.

== Lauri-Ell ==
Lauri-Ell is a Kree warrior and a supporting character in Kelly Thompson's 2020 run on Captain Marvel, first appearing in issue #18.

During the Empyre event, Captain Marvel is given Ronan's hammer by Hulkling and is officially made the Accuser of the newly-formed Kree/Skrull Alliance. Hulking sends Carol on a mission to K'in-Al, a first experimental colony world where Kree and Skrull could live together in peace. Hulking reveals to Carol that the city was destroyed in an explosion and that his men had been in a stalemate with the one responsible ever since. Arriving on the scene, the suspect surrenders immediately and reveals herself to be Lauri-ell, a soldier who was artificially bred by Kree scientists using the DNA of two powerful warriors. Using the hammer, Carol sees a vision of her mother Mari-Ell, confirming that she and Lauri-Ell are half-sisters. Lauri-ell maintains that she is innocent but states that she understands that Carol's role as Accuser necessitates her arrest but Carol defies her orders and smuggles Lauri-Ell to Earth while she conducts her investigation into the bombing. Carol and her team discover that anti-Kree criminal Wastrel is responsible for destroying the colony and Lauri-Ell's name is cleared. During a battle with the Cotati, Lauri-Ell picks up the hammer when Carol is disabled and officially becomes the new Accuser.

== Demetrius Lazer ==
Demetrius Lazer is a character appearing in American comic books published by Marvel Comics. The character, created by Chris Claremont, Randy Green and Aaron Lopresti, first appeared in Decimation: House of M - The Day After #1 (November 2005). Lazer is a leading member of the Office of National Emergency.

== Leather Boy ==
- Further reading: Leather Boy at the Comic Book DB (archived from the original); Leather Boy at the Grand Comics Database

Leather Boy (Gene Lorrene) is a BDSM-obsessed individual who answered an ad left in the paper by Mister Immortal to join his team the Great Lakes Avengers as Leather Boy. When they discovered that he did not have any superpowers, he was immediately booted off the team. Leather Boy, now donning a Doctor Doom-inspired version of his outfit, learns of Squirrel Girl's indoctrination into the team and takes revenge by killing Squirrel Girl's companion Monkey Joe. However, Leather Boy is immediately stopped by Big Bertha.

== Henri LeBeau ==
Henri LeBeau is a character appearing in the Marvel Comics universe. The character, created by Howard Mackie and Lee Weeks, first appeared in Gambit vol. 1 #1 (December 1993). He is the adoptive brother of Remy LeBeau / Gambit and a member of the Thieves Guild.

== Jean-Luc LeBeau ==
Jean-Luc LeBeau is a character appearing in the Marvel Comics universe. The character, created by Howard Mackie and Lee Weeks, first appeared in Gambit #1 (December 1993). He is the adoptive father of Remy LeBeau / Gambit and a member of the Thieves Guild.

=== Jean-Luc LeBeau in other media ===
Jean-Luc LeBeau appears in the X-Men: Evolution episode "Cajun Spice", voiced by Brian Drummond.

== Lectronn ==
Lectronn (Tommy Samuels) is a fictional superhero in the Marvel Comics universe. Created by Sholly Fisch and James Fry, he first appeared in Marvel Age #49 (January 1987).

As a child, Tommy Samuels contracted polio and lost the use of his legs. Years later, an alien came to Earth looking for a worthy person to bestow power upon. He chose Samuels, and granted him atomic powers and healed his legs. Thrilled with his new powers, Samuels becomes the hero Lectronn, but soon learns the responsibility associated with his powers.

Lectronn appears in the Civil War storyline, where he is apprehended by Iron Man and Spider-Man after opposing the Superhuman Registration Act. The one-shot Civil War: Battle Damage Report elaborates on the circumstances of his early activities, retirement, and return to action.

== Ganke Lee ==
- Further reading: Ganke Lee at the Comic Book DB (archived from the original); Ganke Lee at the Grand Comics Database

Ganke Lee is a supporting character in stories featuring Miles Morales / Spider-Man. The character, created by Brian Michael Bendis and Sara Pichelli, first appeared in Ultimate Comics Spider-Man (vol. 2) #2 (November 2011), which was published as part of Marvel Comics' Ultimate Marvel line of books, which are set in a universe and continuity separate from the "mainstream" Marvel Universe.

Ganke is a Korean-American boy and Miles's classmate, best friend and confidant. After the accident behind Miles's superhuman abilities, Ganke is the first one with whom Miles shares this secret, and is the one who immediately suggests that Miles use these new powers as the new Spider-Man. Marvel Comics ended the Ultimate Marvel imprint with the 2015 "Secret Wars" storyline, in which the Marvel Universe was merged with other alternate universes (including the Ultimate Universe). Molecule Man's efforts transported Miles, Ganke and their respective families and friends to the mainstream universe.

Ganke befriends Danika Hart, a YouTuber obsessed with Spider-Man. He acts as an indirect source for Danika, but asks to be called "Ned" rather than use his real name.

=== Ganke Lee in other media ===
- Elements of Ganke Lee are incorporated in the Marvel Cinematic Universe (MCU)'s depiction of Ned Leeds, portrayed by Jacob Batalon.
- Ganke Lee makes a non-speaking appearance in Spider-Man: Into the Spider-Verse. He was originally going to play a more substantial role, voiced by Peter Sohn, but the filmmakers ultimately decided to develop his character's storyline in future films due to similarities to the MCU incarnation of Ned Leeds.
  - Lee appears in the sequel, Spider-Man: Across the Spider-Verse, voiced by Sohn.
- Ganke Lee appears in Spider-Man: Miles Morales, voiced by Griffin Puatu. This version aids Miles Morales with his technical and software expertise.
  - Lee appears in Spider-Man 2, voiced again by Puatu.

== Gordon Lefferts ==
Gordon Lefferts is a mutant. Created by Fabian Nicieza and Greg Capullo, the character first appeared in X-Force vol. 1 #18 (November 1992).

Dr. Gordon Lefferts was a scientist who worked alongside Mister Sinister, getting manipulated by Stryfe into releasing the Legacy Virus which kills him.

== Left Hand ==
- Further reading: Left Hand at the Comic Book DB (archived from the original); Left Hand at the Grand Comics Database

Left Hand (Diego Casseas) is a member of the Folding Circle. Diego Casseas' wife was one of the brides of the Dragon's Breadth cult that Diego's military unit, the "Half-Fulls", encountered in Cambodia during the Vietnam war. The cult had been breeding superhumans for centuries, hoping to tap into the vast power of the Well of All Things, a mystic portal in an ancient temple. The Half-Fulls became part of this breeding program, each member fathering a child with a cult member. Diego's wife died and their daughter was left comatose after the fall of an elevator. Diego, having studied sorcery, stole his daughter's powers ten years later and became the Left Hand.

The Left Hand had the ability to access and manipulate the energy of the Darkforce dimension. He used this ability to project blasts of extreme concussive force (sufficient to kill a human being with little effort), and to teleport himself and others over long distances.

== Left-Winger ==
Left-Winger, real name Hector Lennox, is a U.S. Army veteran from Houston, Texas who became bored during peace-time service. He signs up for the Power Broker's strength augmentation process and joins the Unlimited Class Wrestling Federation. Later, Lennox's army friend John Walker (Super-Patriot) approaches him to form a team of superhumans, the B.U.C.s (Bold Urban Commandos) or "Buckies". This group consists of Lennox, Lemar Hoskins, and Jerome Johnson.

Eventually, the Commission on Superhuman Activities selects Walker to replace Steve Rogers as Captain America, and Hoskins to become his partner Bucky (later Battlestar). Lennox and Johnson are left behind, feeling betrayed and angered. They take the names Left-Winger and Right-Winger respectively. After Left-Winger and Right-Winger's actions inadvertently cause the death of Walker's parents, Walker attacks the two, leaving them in critical condition. It is later revealed that Left-Winger and Right-Winger survived, but committed suicide after undergoing treatment.

== Leonus ==
Leonus is a lion-like Inhuman who is one of several Inhuman criminals found guilty of treason and banished to another dimension. When the Hulk attacks Lockjaw, he teleports the Hulk to the dimension where the evil Inhumans have been banished. Maximus appears and recruits them all as part of his military takeover of Attilan, and teleports them all back to the Hidden Land. Maximus seeks a device created by the ancient Inhuman scientist Romnar, which can absorb people. The evil Inhumans use the Hulk to gain access to the device, and build a ray gun to attack Black Bolt. The evil Inhumans squabble over the device for their own ideals of conquest, and Black Bolt is able to defeat them. To try to regain Black Bolt's favor, the evil Inhumans try to stop the Hulk as he rampages through Attilan, but only Black Bolt is able to stop the Hulk.

== Leper Queen ==
Leper Queen is a supervillain created by Peter Milligan and Salvador Larroca, first appearing in House of M: The Day After #1 (January 2006). She is the leader of the anti-mutant terrorist organization, the Sapien League.

Prior to joining the Sapien League, the Leper Queen had a pyrokinetic mutant daughter, whose powers accidentally caused her own death and the disfigurement of her mother. After the Decimation, she leads the Sapien League in attacking mutants. During the re-emergence of Bastion, she is forcibly recruited into the Purifiers and infected with the Transmode Virus. After plots involving the forced infection of mutants with the virus to act as biological weapons, the Leper Queen is killed by X-23, which she is thankful for as her servitude to Bastion caused her pain.

== Lifeforce ==
Lifeforce is a member of the Dark Riders. Along with the rest of the Dark Riders, Lifeforce was sent to hunt down mutants found unfit by their leader Genesis. Their first target was the former Dark Rider Foxbat. Lifeforce maliciously sucked the life out of him, leaving him for dead. As the Dark Riders went up against a few of the X-Men, Lifeforce battled Domino but was defeated. Lifeforce eventually joined her comrades Spyne and Hurricane in breaking the mutant Cyber out of prison. She was killed during an adamantium bonding process on Wolverine when the latter rejected the adamantium, causing shrapnel to stab into her body.

== Lifter ==
Lifter (Ned Lathrop) is a mutant supervillain in the Marvel Comics universe. He was created by Jack Kirby, and first appeared in Captain America Annual #4 (1977).

Lifter first appears as a member of the second incarnation of the Brotherhood of Mutants. The character is a mutant with the ability to lift heavy objects by canceling the effect of gravity upon them and increase his own density. His name has been included on a list of Mutants who have been depowered by the events of House of M and "Decimation" that was printed by Wizard Magazine. However the accuracy of the list has been disputed.

== Lightbright ==
Lightbright (Obax Majid) first appeared in Silver Sable #16, (September 1993), and was created by Gregory Wright and Steven Butler.

At one point in her life, Lightbright was apprehended by the Bio-Genes, a part of the terrorist group Hydra, due both to her mutant powers and the fact she was a Somali rebel. The Bio-Genes were defeated by Silver Sable and her Wild Pack organization. Battlestar offered Lightbright a chance to redeem herself and she agreed to join the group. Joining the Wild Pack on several of its missions, Lightbright apparently liked the idea of being a super-hero. However, the group disbanded.

Lightbright is a photokinetic mutant, able to generate and manipulate heat and light energy. In addition to flight and creating blasts of energy, she emits a light that induces calm in those around her.

== William Lincoln ==
William Lincoln is a character appearing in American comic books published by Marvel Comics. The character, created by David W. Mack and Joe Quesada, first appeared in Daredevil vol. 2 #9 (December 1999). The character is the father of Maya Lopez / Echo.

=== William Lincoln in other media ===
Zahn McClarnon portrayed William Lopez in the Disney+ series Hawkeye (2021) and Echo (2024).

== Lin Feng ==
Lin Feng, later known as War Fist, is a character appearing in American comic books published by Marvel Comics. The character was created by writer Shuizhu and artist Gunji, and made his first appearance in Warriors of Three Sovereigns #11 (July 2019). He is the older brother of Lin Lie, the former Sword Master and current Iron Fist.

Lin Feng and his archeologist father go missing while excavating the tomb of the dark god Chiyou, prompting Lin Lie to take up the Sword of Fu Xi he received from their father and search for them, while beginning a superhero career as Sword Master. However, Feng had actually pledged himself to Chiyou, who imbued him with his power and sent him off to unseal his three tombs.

When the Sword of Fu Xi is destroyed, Feng destroys Chiyou's first tomb before making his way to destroy the second one with an army of Chiyou's demons. He is confronted by Lie, who became the new Iron Fist after the Sword's destruction and fails to convince his brother into joining him. Feng is wounded by Lie as Sparrow arrives with reinforcements from K'un-L'un to back up Iron Fist; having anticipated this, Feng steals her portal to K'un-L'un, where Chiyou's third tomb is located. With Iron Fist, Yu-Ti, and K'un-L'un's best warriors trapped on Earth, Feng has his army sack K'un-L'un in search of the tomb.

In the series Deadly Hands of K'un-Lun, Feng leads his army in destroying the other Capital Cities of Heaven and killing the Immortal Weapons. Feng's plans fall apart when more of Lie's allies arrive as backup, resulting in his portal's destruction and losing his control over the War Fists. Desperate and goaded by Chiyou's voice, Feng uses Chiyou's Soul Orbs and Sword to revive him, who takes over Feng's body. Chiyou is defeated by Lie, which allows Feng to regain control over his body. However, Loki stabs Feng from behind with the Sword of Chiyou, which seals Chiyou within it, and takes Feng prisoner. Having renounced Chiyou, Feng discovers that he still has a portion of his power and declares himself the Immortal War Fist.

=== Powers and Abilities ===
Due to being empowered by the god Chiyou, Lin Feng possesses many magical abilities. Feng can control and summon Chiyou's demonic minions and can even transform humans into them as well. He can project destructive blasts of dark magic, grow razor sharp talons from his fingers, and empower people with Chiyou's magic.

Although Loki managed to remove most of Chiyou's powers from him, he left Feng with a sliver of the God or War's powers, giving him similar abilities to those of his brother's Iron Fist powers and the War Fists.

Feng is also proficient in martial arts and extremely knowledgeable in history and archeology.

== Lion ==
Lion is the name of two characters appearing in American comic books published by Marvel Comics. The first was created by Simon Furman and Geoff Senior, and debuted in Dragon's Claws #1 (May 1988). The second was created by Joshua Hale Fialkov and Juan Doe, and debuted in Fear Itself: Monkey King #1 (September 2011).

=== Lion (Earth-5555) ===
The Lion of Earth-5555 as a member of a minor league team called the Wildcats.

=== Lion (Crime boss version) ===
Lion is the name of a crime boss who was an antagonist to Monkey King.

=== Lion in other media ===
An original version of the character named Nkati appears in Eyes of Wakanda, voiced by Cress Williams. This version was a Wakandan general of the Hatut Zaraze in 1260 BC who left to become a pirate/warlord. He planned to form the "Pride of the Lion". Nkati fought former Dora Milaje member Noni. After being defeated alongside his warriors, Nkati committed suicide by setting his lair to self-destruct.

== Live Wire ==
Live Wire (Rance Preston) is a character in Marvel Comics. He first appeared in Fantastic Four Annual #5 (November 1967), and was created by Stan Lee and Jack Kirby. The character subsequently appears in Marvel Two-in-One #70 (December 1980), and then as a member of the Circus of Crime in Ghost Rider (vol. 2) #72–73 (September–October 1982).

Rance Preston was born in Houston, Texas. His weapon is an electrified lariat of which he is a master. He also has various skills that he learned working on a ranch as a cowboy, such as horseback riding. Live Wire frees the Circus of Crime from a prison wagon on its way to the penitentiary, and he then joins the group. While battling John Steele, Live Wire was apparently accidentally eaten by Princess Python's pet snake.

Live Wire has an electrified cable that he uses as a lariat. Anyone ensnared by it suffers damage from the electricity. He wears insulated gloves and clothing that protects him from electricity.

== Living Diamond ==
Living Diamond is a character appearing in American comic books published by Marvel Comics. first appeared in X-Men #39 (December 1967), and was created by Roy Thomas and Werner Roth.

Jack Winters was a criminal whose latent mutations were activated by exposure to atomic radiation, which gave him flexible living diamond-like hands, telepathy, and teleportation. After further exposure to radiation, his entire body took on the same diamond-like properties. Living Diamond tries to convince Cyclops to convince Scott to join him in a life of crime, but Professor X intervened. Professor X used an ultrasonic vibration inducer to subdue the Living Diamond. When Living Diamond resisted, he exploded and was killed.

== Living Totem ==
Living Totem is a character appearing in American comic books published by Marvel Comics. Created by Stan Lee and Jack Kirby, he first appeared in Rawhide Kid #22 (March 1961).

The Living Totem is an alien resembling a totem pole who crash-landed on Earth and fought Rawhide Kid, who tricked it into falling into a ravine. Years later, the Totem climbed its way out and was recovered by Iron Mask, who wanted to use it as part of his own supervillain gang, but the Totem was buried under a collapsing cliff by the time-stranded West Coast Avengers. At some later point, the adventurer Ulysses Bloodstone unsuccessfully searched for the Totem.

=== Living Totem in other media ===
Living Totem appears in Lego Marvel Super Heroes 2.

== Llan the Sorcerer ==
Llan the Sorcerer is an extradimensional entity and enemy of Alpha Flight, specifically Talisman. Once every 10,000 years, he manifests on Earth and attempts to corrupt, conquer and annex it into the Twisted Realms, a coalition of predominantly 'evil' dimensions (such as Svartalfheim). This plot culminates in opening The Gateway of Night; a magical nexus point the Twisted Realms can converge at and invade through, located in the northern wastes of Canada. However, by decree of Eternity, he must follow strict ritualistic rules of engagement against a mortal avatar of the Talisman power acting in Earth's defense. Despite ultimately being thwarted each time, his penchant for vast collateral damage was enough to implicate him in "the great devastation" 20,000 years before modern day. Elizabeth Twoyoungmen implies that Canada's propensity towards eldritch mystical threats stems from Llan's routine incursions.

== Llyron ==
Llyron is the son of Llyra and was genetically accelerated in age by Llyra so that he might take the crown of Atlantis. His mother Llyra was a Lemurian/human hybrid and a foe of Namor. She decided to conceive a child with Namor and introduce him as a successor to the Atlantean throne. After discovering that Namor was sterile, Llyra instead seduced a human named Leon McKenzie to create Llyron. Leon's father Lawrence was Namor's half-brother via their father Leonard, thus making Leon Namor's nephew and by extension Llyron is Namor's great nephew. The Atlantean Council voted Namor off the throne, and declared Llyron to be his rightful heir. However, the sorceress Morgan le Fay raised Atlantis from the ocean floor, and in the resulting chaos Llyron left with a number of Atlantean refugees to find a new home.

Llyron has super-human strength, agility, endurance, and some resistance to physical and energy attacks. He also possesses gills, allowing him to breathe underwater as well as on land, and can swim incredibly fast compared to humans. Llyron is resistant to cold, presumably another adaptation to undersea life.

== Lobo Brothers ==
The Lobo Brothers are two supervillains appearing in American comic books published by Marvel Comics. The brothers are Carlos and Eduardo and are later joined by their sister: Esmeralda Lobo. They first appeared in Spectacular Spider-Man #143 (October 1988) and were created by Gerry Conway and Sal Buscema.

Carlos and Eduardo Lobo grew up in poverty on the streets of Puebla de Zaragoza, Mexico, surviving by stealing and scavenging for food. As a teenager, Eduardo had fallen in love with a girl named Esmelda Valdez, the daughter of a wealthy ranch owner. The two had a romantic relationship until it was discovered by Esmelda's brother Ramón. One full moon night, Ramón and his men ambushed the two lovers and tried to drive Eduardo away by using whips on him. Pain and rage from this whipping triggered Eduardo's mutant ability to transform into a werewolf-like form, causing him to kill Ramón, his men, and Esmelda. Carlos later discovers that he possesses the same abilities as Eduardo. The brothers then turned to crime using their powers to unite all the mobs of South Texas into Los Hermanos De La Luna. The Lobo Brothers were so successful that they not only gained a mansion in a Dallas suburb but drew the attention of the Arranger, the Kingpin's lieutenant. The Arranger used the Persuader to brainwash the Punisher into attempting an assassination of the Lobo Brothers. The plan failed thanks to Spider-Man's interference and the iron will of the Punisher, who ended up killing the Persuader instead. The Lobo Brothers knew who was responsible for the attempt and they vowed revenge.

Soon after arriving in New York, Eduardo encounters Glory Grant, secretary of J. Jonah Jameson, and plans to seduce her. During a subsequent meeting with the Kingpin, Glory kills Eduardo, claiming she was aiming at Spider-Man and missed. In the storyline "Dead No More: The Clone Conspiracy", Eduardo Lobo is resurrected by Jackal and his company New U Technologies.

The Lobo brothers are mutants who can both transform into werewolf-like forms. This gives them superhuman physical abilities both while transformed and in their human forms.

=== Lobos Brothers in other media ===
Eduardo Lobo appears as a boss in The Amazing Spider-Man and Captain America in Dr. Doom's Revenge!.

== Dog Logan ==
"Dog" Logan is a character appearing in American comic books published by Marvel Comics. He is the elder half-brother of James "Logan" Howlett / Wolverine. He first appeared in Origin #1 (September 2001), and was created by Bill Jemas, Paul Jenkins, Joe Quesada and Andy Kubert.

Dog is a servant on the Howlett estate in the late 19th century, located in Alberta, Canada, and the son of Thomas Logan, a groundskeeper of the Howlett estate. As an adolescent, Dog is the playmate of James and Rose O'Hara. The three children are good friends. Dog saves James from drowning in a river, but Dog gets frequent beatings from his abusive alcoholic father for spending time with members of the upper class. As a young teenager, Dog is cruel, sadistic and brash, going so far as to make unwanted sexual advances toward Rose. James foils an attempt by Dog to assault Rose sexually, reporting the incident to John Howlett Jr. (James's legal father) so Dog kills James's dog in retaliation, resulting in both Dog's and Thomas's expulsion from the estate (for failing to rein in his son). Thomas later returns to the Howlett estate that night with Dog, planning on leaving with Elizabeth Howlett (James's mentally-disturbed mother) while implying he is James's father. Thomas and Dog, however, are soon discovered by John, quickly engaging in a heated verbal exchange that culminates with Thomas shooting John in the head with a shotgun while James walks into the room and witnesses his father's death. The trauma of the event triggers James's mutant powers, particularly bone claws, which are utilized against Thomas and Dog, resulting in Thomas's death and Dog being slashed severely across his face which leaves three large scars. Elizabeth's fragile sanity ceases and kills herself as James runs crying from the house with Rose pursuing which all happens in front of Dog, the only survivor left at the scene when the police arrived; Dog fraudulently-reports that Rose is responsible.

Years later, Dog is hired by John Howlett Sr. (James's grandfather) to track James. Dog accepted, but with the intention of killing rather than returning to James's dying grandfather. Now fully grown, Dog is large and powerfully built with lightly colored hair. He eventually tracks James to the mining town where James and Rose have been staying since they ran from the Howlett estate. Dog spends some time in the town, learning James's habits and watches as James and Smitty, the foreman of the camp and James's close friend, participate in a cage fight. James, despite being enraged over Smitty's relationship with Rose, allows Smitty to win the fight. After the fight, Dog suddenly attacks James. During the fight, Dog claims that James is responsible for the death of John Jr. (even though Dog's father was actually the one responsible). James manages to defeat Dog and extends bone claws, preparing to kill him yet Rose suddenly arrives. As James prepares to strike, Rose runs into James's claws and is fatally wounded. Grief-stricken, James runs from the camp and into the forest, leaving Dog behind.

Later in the Astonishing Spider-Man & Wolverine mini series, Dog encounters Spider-Man travelling through time. Dog enters a mine containing the glowing diamonds responsible for Spider-Man's time travel. The diamonds send him to the present day.

In the present day, Dog Logan is seen alive in the Canadian wilderness, obsessed with reading newspaper articles about Wolverine creating his own school. While in the future (the present) in his cabin, he is greeted by a future version of himself who tells him it was time for him to start hunting his brother in the Savage Land, without giving out anything of the outcome of the battle. Through unknown means, he made it to the Savage Land and shot down his brother with a laser pistol while he's jumping around the trees in order to teach Wolverine a lesson.

Logan is offered a teaching job at the Hellfire Club's Hellfire Academy, where he became a gym teacher. Amidst the Hellfire Academy's destruction, Logan escapes into the Siege Perilous.

=== Powers and abilities of Dog Logan ===
Dog is tall and powerfully built and demonstrates impressive tracking abilities, though it remains unrevealed precisely how he locates his brother and Rose. Dog also shows himself to be a formidable combatant.

In his appearances in the present day, Logan has mastered the use of the time diamonds and is able to use them to travel through time seemingly at will, and to transport people and things from different time periods to his own location. He has also acquired an arsenal of highly advanced weaponry from various future eras, including plasma rifles, poison darts filled with alien venom, and an Adamantium battle-axe.

=== Dog Logan's connection with Sabretooth ===
Paul Jenkins responded on the question of Dog and Sabretooth as the same character by saying "Who knows? In my mind, Dog is not intended to be Sabretooth, but he could be. It doesn't matter. As long as the next writer respects the character and writes a simple story, anything could happen." Marvel Comics released the one-shot specialty comic entitled X-Men Origins: Sabretooth which chronicled some of Sabretooth's earliest childhood experiences but, with the exception of being in an abusive family, differs distinctly from Dog's life as shown in the Origin mini-series. Subsequent appearances of Dog and Sabretooth prove the two are separate people.

== Lodestone ==
Lodestone is the name of several characters appearing in American comic books published by Marvel Comics.

=== Andrea Haggard ===
Lodestone (Andrea Haggard) was hired by crime lord Phillipe Bazin to be experimented upon, granting her power over magnetism, and to stop Darkhawk from interfering in his criminal operations. She fought Darkhawk on several occasions.

Lodestone later joined the seventh incarnation of the Masters of Evil led by Crimson Cowl.

Lodestone was later killed and revived where she joined Hank Pym's Lethal Legion. Ultron tried to use her to build a new body for him during the final battle. After Ultron was defeated with help from Ultron-12, Lodestone and the rest of the Lethal Legion in heading to Sub-Atomica.

=== Warpie ===
Lodestone was a child mutated by the reality manipulations of Mad Jim Jaspers. He had magnetic powers before being depowered by Captain Britain.

Lodestone and his team fought Kylun.

== Logos ==
Logos is a character appearing in American comic books published by Marvel Comics. Created by Terry Kavanagh and Adam Pollina, the character first appeared in The Rise of Apocalypse #1 (August 1996). He is an acquaintance of En Sabah Nur during ancient Egypt times.

== Lodus Logos ==
Lodus Logos is a character appearing in American comic books published by Marvel Comics. Created by Al Ewing and Guiu Vilanova, he first appeared in S.W.O.R.D. (vol. 2) #8 (November 2021).

Lodus Logos is an Arakkii Omega-level mutant with the ability to create and manipulate metal with his voice. A renowned poet, he sits on the Great Ring of Arakko, where he is consulted on matters related to artistic expression. After Arakko is nearly destroyed by Uranos, Lodus proposes a new direction for the island and its people, prompting Storm to yield the regency of Arakko to him.

== Longneck ==
Longneck (William Hanover) is a character appearing in X-Men comic books published by Marvel Comics. He was created by Grant Morrison and Phil Jimenez, first appearing in New X-Men #140 (April 2003).

Longneck was a student at the Xavier Institute whose mutation gave him an elongated neck. He had been a member of Cyclops' Street team X-Men to battle against Xorn during his rampage through New York. Longneck lost his powers after the events of "M-Day".

== Lord Dark Wind ==
Lord Dark Wind

Publication information
- Publisher: Marvel Comics
- First appearance: Daredevil #196 (July 1983)
- Created by: Denny O'Neil; Klaus Janson

In-story information
- Alter ego: Kenji Oyama

Lord Dark Wind (Kenji Oyama) is a character appearing in American comic books published by Marvel Comics. He is the father of X-Men supervillainess Lady Deathstrike and Lord Deathstrike and the inventor of the adamantium bonding process. The character first appeared in Daredevil #196 (July 1983). He was created by Denny O'Neil, Larry Hama, and Klaus Janson.

Professor Kenji Oyama was a Japanese scientist who was also a powerful crime lord known as Lord Dark Wind. Kenji is most famous for inventing the adamantium-to-bone bonding process that would be used on Wolverine, Bullseye, and others. He is also the father of Yuriko Oyama, the woman who would later become Lady Deathstrike, and Lord Deathstrike/Kazou Oyama, a Japanese mobster, later killed by Punisher.

A Japanese kamikaze pilot during World War II, the bombs on his plane failed to explode when he crashed into an American aircraft carrier, and he miraculously survived, though his face was scarred. He wrote a book about his experiences and made a fortune from its sales, which he used to buy a private island and set himself up as a lord. During this time he married and had three children. Feeling shamed by his failure decades earlier, he adorned his face with a black cowl and scarred the faces of his children in a ritual design. Seeing mercantilism as inherently dishonorable, he began funding violent political activity, and ordered his two sons to assassinate the Japanese Prime Minister; they died in the attempt.

Intending to employ the assassin Bullseye, he freed him from prison and performed surgeries to replace the damaged bone in his vertebrae with adamantium. Daredevil pursued Bullseye to his estate. His daughter Yuriko allied herself with Daredevil. To free her lover, Kiro, from her father's servitude, and to gain vengeance for her scarring and the death of her two brothers, she killed Lord Dark Wind.

=== Lord Darkwind in other media ===
- Professor Oyama appears in X-Men: The Animated Series.
- Kenji Oyama, credited as Dr. O, appears in Daredevil, portrayed by Glenn Kubota.

== Lord Deathstrike ==
Lord Deathstrike (Kazuo Oyama) is the brother of Yuriko Oyama (Lady Deathstrike). He later became an assassin, working for Sabretooth and becoming an instructor at the Hellfire Academy.

== Lord of Light ==
- Further reading: Lord of Light at the Comic Book DB (archived from the original); Lord of Light at the Grand Comics Database

Lord of Light (Nathan Tyler) is the father of Tandy Bowen in Marvel Comics. The character, created by Bill Mantlo and Bret Blevins, first appeared in Strange Tales (vol. 2) #1 (April 1987).

Tyler married Melissa Bowen and together they had a daughter named Tandy. As time went on, Melissa grew into a hateful materialistic woman, causing Tyler to leave his home for good. He left his entire estate to her while he traveled to India to search for enlightenment.

He studied under several gurus until he learned how to absorb and distribute light. This power caused the negative effect of killing people and thus would initially only use it on the ones who were dying. But as time went on, he started using it on innocents. He gained a following and earned the name the Lord of Light until one day he ran into his daughter and Tyrone Johnson now going by Cloak and Dagger. He temporarily cured Tyrone of the darkness and then tried to convert Tandy so that they could both reach godhood. Tyrone and Tandy battled Tyler who was attempting to drain the light from the latter when his daughter refused. Realizing what he had become, Tyler kills himself by diving into Tyrone's cloak and is devoured by the Predator who lived in the Darkforce dimension.

=== Lord of Light in other media ===
A character loosely based on the Lord of Light named Nathan Bowen appears in Cloak & Dagger, portrayed by Andy Dylan. He is a worker at Roxxon who was killed in a car accident caused by an explosion at a Roxxon oil platform. Nathan primarily appears in flashbacks and hallucinations.

== Lorelei ==
Lorelei is the name of two characters appearing in American comic books published by Marvel Comics.

== James Lucas ==
James Leonard Lucas (legally changed to James Greary) is a character in Marvel Comics. The character, created by Marcus McLaurin and Dwayne Turner, first appeared in Cage #3 (June 1992).

Lucas joined the police force at a young age and rose in the ranks, eventually becoming a detective. During the 70's, Lucas teamed up with reporter Constance Molina, Blue Marvel, Kaluu, Blade, and the mysterious woman known as The Bear and formed The Mighty Avengers. They disbanded after their first and only mission. James settled down with his wife Esther and they both had two sons: James Lucas Jr. aka Coldfire and Carl Lucas aka Luke Cage. James had a rough relationship with Carl who was always getting arrested due to being in a gang. After his wife's death, James and Carl's relationship was strained even more. Years later, James Jr. joined The Corporation which did not settle well with James Sr. due to its racist history. Luke rescues James Sr. from The Corporation, but is unable to save James Jr. who had transformed into Coldfire. Father and son reconcile, but are driven apart by Esther's memory. Luke asks Jessica Jones to look for James who had remarried and changed his name. Though he refuses to speak to Luke initially, he finally sees his son and asks how life is with the Avengers.

=== James Lucas in other media ===
- A character based on James Lucas named Walter Cage appears in Ultimate Spider-Man, voiced by Phil LaMarr. He is a scientist who worked with his wife Amanda to create a variation of the Super Soldier Serum that was behind their son's powers.
- James Lucas appears in Luke Cage (2016), portrayed by an uncredited actor in the first season and by Reg E. Cathey in the second season. This version is Luke Cage's estranged father and a pastor in Savannah, Georgia.

== Lucid ==
Lucid (Maya Jackson) is a character that appeared in Extraordinary X-Men #17 (December 2016) published by Marvel Comics. The character was created by Jeff Lemire and Eric Koda.

When Maya Jackson was affected by M-Pox due the Terrigen Cloud being lethal to mutants, she and her family relocated to X-Haven. Despite receiving medical care, her condition worsen and she asked to meet Storm for her final wish. When Storm arrived, she learned that Maya has admired her and dreamed of joining X-Men. She was given honorary membership by Storm under the codename Lucid, before she died.

== Ludi ==
Ludi is a demon who has clashed with Doctor Strange. Ludi allies himself with the demon known as Dweller-in-Darkness. His power was amplified by the Dweller, who sent him to kill Doctor Strange. The magician and his ally, Clea, used the mystical weapon known as the 'Ebony Blade' to injure Ludi and send him back into his own portal.

== Luis ==
Luis is a character who originated in the Marvel Cinematic Universe before appearing in Marvel comics. The character was created by Edgar Wright, Joe Cornish, Adam McKay and Paul Rudd, and appeared in Ant-Man (2015) and Ant-Man and the Wasp (2018).

=== Luis in film ===
Luis is portrayed by Michael Peña in the Marvel Cinematic Universe.

- In Ant-Man (2015), Luis is introduced as Scott Lang's best friend and former cellmate at San Quentin State Prison. Luis' reason for imprisonment was due to him stealing two smoothie machines, which he seems unusually proud of. Due to Lang's estrangement from his ex-wife, Luis lets Lang stay with him and his friends Dave and Kurt. However, Luis' primary reason for doing so was so that Lang could help rob Hank Pym's house. With no other choice, Lang helps him leading into a series of events that starts Lang's eventual reformation and acceptance of the Ant-Man mantle. Later, Lang calls upon Luis and his friends into helping break into Cross Technologies. Luis goes disguised as a security guard and expresses uneasiness, yet excitement at being a "good guy" and then reaffirms this by rescuing a guard he had earlier knocked out. He, along with Dave and Kurt, attempt to aid in Lang's final battle with Darren Cross, but are scared away by the abundance of police officers in the area. Later, Luis informs Lang that he heard that the Falcon was looking for Lang.
- In Ant-Man and the Wasp (2018), Luis founds X-Con Security Consultants along with Lang, Kurt, and Dave. Luis conducts business despite Lang being placed under house arrest, and occasionally takes part in playing with Cassie Lang. When Lang arrives with Hope van Dyne and Hank Pym, Luis happily chooses to work with the three in capturing Ava Starr. Later on, however, Luis, Kurt and Dave are captured by Sonny Burch who injects Luis with truth serum to make him reveal where Lang and Pym are. Through effort, Luis gives up Lang and Pym's location to Burch and Ava. Luis, Kurt and Dave take part in the chase through San Francisco, knocking out Burch and using the truth serum for revenge. After Lang is released from house arrest, Luis works alongside his friend and their company is hired for a new business. Luis also lets Lang borrow his van to re-enter the Quantum Realm through a quantum tunnel.

=== Luis in comics ===
Luis made his comic book debut in The Astonishing Ant-Man #1 (December 2015), by Nick Spencer and Ramon Rosanas. He is once again Scott Lang's cellmate, but does not have any speaking lines. He does seem to sympathize with Lang, as he looked helpless watching Lang getting beaten up by other inmates.

=== Luis in other media ===
Luis appears in Lego Marvel's Avengers, voiced by Michael Peña.

== Anton Lupeski ==
Anton Lupeski is a character appearing in American comic books published by Marvel Comics. He first appeared in Tomb of Dracula #45 and was created by writer Marv Wolfman and artist Gene Colan. Anton Lupeski's name and background were patterned after Satanic cult leader Anton LaVey.

Lupeski was a Satanic cult leader who summoned Dracula, believing that he was actually summoning Satan himself. Unable to control Dracula as he had hoped, Lupeski then began conspiring to destroy the Lord of Vampires. He even went so far as to conspire with Dracula's most hated enemies: Quincy Harker and his trained team of vampire hunters.

== Lycaon Two Wolves ==
Lycaon Two Wolves is a character appearing in American comic books published by Marvel Comics. He first appeared in X-Men Red (vol. 2) #13 (July, 2023) and was created by Al Ewing, Stefano Caselli, and Jacopo Camagni.

Lycaon is an Arakkii Omega-level mutant who resembles a two-headed "wolftaur" with retractable claws and a healing factor. After the Eternals attack Arakko, Lycaon claims the seat on the Great Ring of Arakko previously held by Idyll.

When Genesis returns to Arakko and incites a civil war, Lycaon sides with her and is later killed by Xilo after refusing to surrender.

== Lyla ==
Lyla, which stands for LYrate Lifeform Approximation, is a character appearing in American comic books published by Marvel Comics. The character, created by writer Peter David and artist Rick Leonardi, made her first appearance in Spider-Man 2099 #1 (September 1992).

Lyla is an artificial intelligence and the assistant of Miguel O'Hara / Spider-Man 2099.

=== Lyla in other media ===
Greta Lee voiced Lyla in the Sony Pictures Animation films Spider-Man: Into the Spider-Verse (2018) and Spider-Man: Across the Spider-Verse (2023). Lee will reprise her role in the sequel Spider-Man: Beyond the Spider-Verse (2027).

== Lylla ==
Lylla is a character appearing in American comic books published by Marvel Comics, primarily as a supporting character of Rocket Raccoon. Created by Bill Mantlo and Sal Buscema, she first appeared in Incredible Hulk #271 (February 1982).

Lylla is an anthropomorphic otter and the heiress to the toymaking empire Mayhem Mekaniks. She inherited the company after her parents are murdered by rival Judson Jakes, who wants to take over the company. The only way for Lylla to gain full control is through marriage. Lylla soon comes under threat from not just Jakes, but also Lord Dyvyne, with both wanting to control her toy company. Luckily, Rocket Raccoon comes to her aid. With the help of their friends, Wal Rus and Pyko, they defeat both parties. Lylla travels with Rocket afterward to start a new life together. These events are later revealed to be false. Lylla, along with the rest of the Halfworlders, are service animals who care for mental patients on their planet. After returning to Halfworld, Lylla marries Blackjack O'Hare.

Lylla possesses the normal attributes of an Earth otter, which includes being an excellent swimmer.

=== Reception of Lylla ===
The Marvel Cinematic Universe incarnation of Lylla was positively received. Rachel Harp of PETA praised Lylla for highlighting the "evils of animal testing", while Ashvaria Rai of Comic Book Resources wrote, "Lylla leaves a lasting impact on audiences, even with her all-too-brief screen time in Guardians of the Galaxy Vol. 3. Her gentleness toward others and contagious hope for a better life establish her as one of the most amicable new characters." Hannah Saab and Vidhi Narula of Collider ranked the final quote of Lylla in Guardians of the Galaxy Vol. 3 1st in their "11 Best Inspirational Marvel Quotes" list. Michael Walsh of Nerdist ranked Lylla 6th in their "10 Best Animals in the MCU" list, calling her "the greatest cybernetically-enhanced otter." Anthony Orlando of Digital Trends ranked Lylla 6th in their "Best Characters in Guardians of the Galaxy Vol. 3" list.

=== Lylla in other media ===
- Lylla appears in Guardians of the Galaxy Vol. 3, voiced by Linda Cardellini. This version, also referred to as 89Q12, was created by the High Evolutionary and sports robotic arms. In flashbacks, she befriended fellow test subjects Rocket, Teefs, and Floor and attempted to escape Counter-Earth before being killed by the High Evolutionary's forces. In the present, Rocket encounters Lylla and his friends during a near-death experience.
- Lylla appears in Guardians of the Galaxy: The Telltale Series, voiced by Fryda Wolff. This version previously died on Halfworld after Rocket escaped from it. Depending on the player's choices, she can be revived using the Eternity Forge.
- Lylla appears in Marvel's Guardians of the Galaxy.
- In 2017, Funko released a Lylla Funko Pop figure inspired by the Guardians of the Galaxy: The Telltale Series incarnation of the character.

== Michael Lynch ==
Michael Lynch is a character appearing in American comic books published by Marvel Comics. Created by Mike Carlin and Paul Neary, he first appeared in The Thing #35.

A lieutenant in the United States army, Michael Lynch first appears saving Sharon Ventura from a group of muggers. Later ambushed by the muggers seeking revenge, he is saved by Ben Grimm, who is looking for Sharon himself, trying to prevent her being subject to the Power Broker's augmentation process. The two men rescue an empowered Sharon and take her to safety. On seeing Sharon in a wrestling outfit, Lynch compares her to the heroine Ms. Marvel, prompting Sharon to take it for her own.

Unbeknownst to Venture or Grimm, Lynch was secretly in league with the Power Broker, as part of a government project to produce a super-soldier, and his encounter with Sharon was part of this plan. Lynch betrays Sharon, returning her to the Power Broker for experimentation, where she is found by Captain America in a brainwashed state. Lynch has the super-soldier G.I. Max attack Captain America in an attempt to cover up his treachery, but in trying to shoot him fatally wounds G.I. Max instead. Lynch is arrested and put in prison.
