= Maelstrom (comics) =

Fictional character appearing in Marvel Comics

- Maelstrom (left) battles the Thing and the Inhumans on the cover of Marvel Two-In-One #72 (February 1981).

Publication information
- Publisher: Marvel Comics
- First appearance: Marvel Two-In-One #71 (January 1981)
- Created by: Mark Gruenwald; Ralph Macchio; Ron Wilson

In-story information
- Species: Deviant–Inhuman hybrid
- Notable aliases: Anomaly; Cosmic Assassin; Malcolm Stromberg
- Abilities: (Currently): Genius-level intellect; Superhuman strength, durability, and longevity; Kinetic manipulation; Near omniscience; (Formerly): Use of quantum bands

Maelstrom is a fictional character appearing in American comic books published by Marvel Comics.

== Publication history ==
Maelstrom first appears in Marvel Two-in-One #71 (January 1981) and was created by Mark Gruenwald, Ralph Macchio, and Ron Wilson.

== Fictional character biography ==
Maelstrom is the son of Phaeder, an Inhuman scientist banished from their city of Attilan for attempting cloning to increase Inhuman population numbers. Phaeder came to live among the Deviants and eventually had an affair with the Deviant Morga, who gave birth to Maelstrom. With his father's tutoring, Maelstrom becomes a skilled geneticist. After his father is incapacitated in an experiment, Maelstrom swears revenge on the Inhumans and becomes a would-be conqueror.

Maelstrom first encounters Earth's superhumans when he sends his minions—Phobius, Gronk, and Helio—to the scientific island facility Hydro-Base to steal an Anti-Terrigen mist compound. This substance can undo the effects of the Terrigen Mist and deprive Inhumans of their abilities. Maelstrom's Minions, however, are defeated by the Thing and Stingray.

The Thing, Gorgon, and Karnak travel via submarine to Maelstrom's laboratory and discover a base where they are subsequently captured. The heroes escape and battle Maelstrom alongside Black Bolt. The heroes hold off Maelstrom while Black Bolt intercepts and defuses a missile carrying the anti-Terrigen mist compound that is programmed to destroy Attilan. The Thing weakens Maelstrom by using the compound on him, and the heroes escape as the base self-detonates. Maelstrom orders his minion Deathurge to kill him.

Maelstrom and his minions survive by transferring their minds into clone bodies. Maelstrom attempts to siphon the energies of the Eternals, but is thwarted by the Avengers and transfers his consciousness to another clone body. Maelstrom attempts to stop the Earth's rotation and absorb the kinetic energy, but is drawn into conflict with the Avengers once more. The android Vision discovers a way to overload Maelstrom's power source and his body becomes discorporate and floats free from Earth.

Maelstrom later encounters Kronos and learns of the existence of the entity Oblivion. As Oblivion's avatar, Maelstrom becomes determined to achieve Oblivion's goal of non-existence on a universal scale. Maelstrom assumes the powers of the entity Anomaly, becoming the embodiment of the abstract principle of anomaly. This brings Maelstrom into conflict with Quasar in the Outer Void (realm of Oblivion). After several battles, Quasar finally defeats Maelstro, who is consumed by the power of Quasar's quantum bands. Maelstrom is later revived by his minions, but learns he has a son, Ransak, who would have been killed had he succeeded in his plan. Ashamed, he shrinks himself out of sight.

Eventually, Maelstrom returns, attempting to destroy the universe by creating a device known as the Cosmic Crunch. He battles the Great Lakes Avengers, who are powerless to stop him. In order to be prepared, he hires Batroc the Leaper and his brigade to help him. During the final battle, Maelstrom is tricked into killing himself by Mr. Immortal after he tells him that the grand secret of the universe was eternal loneliness. His soul is collected by Doorman, who had been chosen by Oblivion to replace Deathurge as its new angel of death.

Drax the Destroyer and Quasar encounter Maelstrom after being killed and sent to the realm of Oblivion. Maelstrom comes into possession of Phyla's Quantum Bands and feeds her to the Dragon of the Moon. He is eventually defeated by Drax and Wendell Vaughn, with Phyla killing the dragon. It is revealed that the preceding events were a ruse for Oblivion to recruit Phyla-Vell as his avatar.

== Powers and abilities ==
Maelstrom can absorb, channel, and otherwise project all forms of kinetic energy for his own purposes, such as strength enhancement, concussive blasts, force field generation, and size shifting. For a short period, Maelstrom possessed Quasar's quantum bands, which enables him to draw on virtually unlimited power from the other-dimensional Quantum Zone. He was able to achieve "cosmic awareness" after learning this secret from the entity Eon.

He is a genius in the scientific disciplines of biology and genetics.
