= Dinah Soar =

- Dinah Soar as depicted in Deadpool Corps: Rank and Foul (March 2010). Art by Gus Vazquez.

Publication information
- Publisher: Marvel Comics
- First appearance: West Coast Avengers (vol. 2) #46 (July 1989)
- Created by: John Byrne

In-story information
- Species: Pterosaur-like humanoid of unknown origins
- Place of origin: Savage Land
- Team affiliations: Great Lakes Avengers
- Notable aliases: Dina-Soar; Wisconsin's Winged Wonder
- Abilities: Flight via razor wings; Sonic scream; Empathic calming; Advanced longevity

Dinah Soar is a superheroine appearing in American comic books published by Marvel Comics. Her name can be read as a double pun, both on the word "dinosaur" and on the singer Dinah Shore.

== Publication history ==
Dinah Soar was created by John Byrne, and first appeared in West Coast Avengers (vol. 2) #46 (July 1989).

== Fictional character biography ==
Dinah Soar is a humanoid pterosaur who was born in the Savage Land. Her lineage is never revealed and it is unknown if she is a mutant or of alien descent.

Dinah became a founding member of the Great Lakes Avengers when Mr. Immortal first assembled the team. She possesses the ability to calm Immortal when he becomes overwhelmed with stress and rage after resurrection. Dinah is unable to speak English and communicates with chirps.

In the G.L.A. mini-series, the Great Lakes Avengers battle Maelstrom, who is attempting to destroy the universe. During the battle, Maelstrom kills Dinah with an energy blast.

== Powers and abilities ==
Dinah Soar possesses a pterosaur-like physiology that enables her to fly at high speeds. She has a hypersonic voice that allows her to project inaudible sound waves, as well as an empathic rapport capable of calming Mr. Immortal after he resurrects.
