= Batroc the Leaper =

Marvel Comics fictional character

- Batroc the Leaper as depicted in Unbelievable Gwenpool #24 (January 2018). Art by Gurihiru.

Publication information
- Publisher: Marvel Comics
- First appearance: Tales of Suspense #75 (March 1966)
- Created by: Stan Lee; Jack Kirby

In-story information
- Alter ego: Georges Batroc
- Species: Human
- Team affiliations: Thunderbolts; Batroc's Brigade; Masters of Evil; Legion Accursed; Lethal Legion; The Agents of MODOK (Mercenary Organization Dedicated Only to Killing)
- Partnerships: Gwen Poole
- Notable aliases: The Leaper
- Abilities: Master French kickboxer; Expert hand to hand combatant; Olympic level athlete and weightlifter; Extraordinary agility, flexibility and reflexes; Experienced thief and smuggler

Georges Batroc the Leaper (French: Batroc le Sauteur) is a fictional character appearing in American comic books published by Marvel Comics. Created by writer Stan Lee and artist Jack Kirby, the character first appeared in Tales of Suspense #75, 1966. He is a mercenary and a master of the French form of kick-boxing known as savate, commonly depicted as an adversary of Captain America, and a mentor of Gwen Poole. Batroc's name derives from the word batrachia, a classification of amphibians that includes frogs, which also plays on the stereotype of calling French people frogs.

Georges St-Pierre portrays Batroc in the Marvel Cinematic Universe film Captain America: The Winter Soldier (2014) and the Disney+ miniseries The Falcon and the Winter Soldier and animated series What If...? (both 2021).

== Publication history ==
Batroc, created by Stan Lee and Jack Kirby, first appeared in Tales of Suspense #75 in March 1966. He has reappeared in various Marvel titles ever since.

Sporting a new costume designed by John Romita Jr., Batroc served as Klaw's top lieutenant in the first arc of Reginald Hudlin's 2005 re-launch of Black Panther.

Sporting a muted, subtle redesign by Gurihiru, Batroc served as the primary mentor of Gwenpool in Christopher Hastings' 2016–2018 series The Unbelievable Gwenpool, with their relationship being described as "one of the warmest aspects" of the series.

== Fictional character biography ==
Georges Batroc was born in Marseille, France, and served in the French Foreign Legion. He is a French costumed mercenary who specializes in savate (also known as "La Boxe Française"), a form of kickboxing, with acrobatic skills and unusual articulate flexibility. Although he has primarily appeared in the pages of Captain America, he has also faced off against the Punisher, Spider-Man, Deadpool, Hawkeye, Iron Fist, and Gambit. Batroc has occasionally led his own team, "Batroc's Brigade"; his most constant companions are Zaran and Machete, although the membership has changed over time. The group has primarily fought Captain America.

In Batroc's first appearance, he is hired by Them to steal the Inferno-42 cylinder. He first battles Captain America during this mission. When Batroc introduces himself with typical bluster, Captain America reveals, to Batroc's delight, that he had already heard of him. Batroc is later hired by Hydra and abducts Sharon Carter for them. He lures Captain America into a rematch, in which he insists Hydra not intervene, and again loses. Hydra agents prepare to kill Batroc and Captain America; Batroc, incensed at such "men wizout honair", helps Captain America against Hydra.

The alien Jakar, concealing his true nature and intent, hires Batroc's Brigade to abduct children from New York and to battle Captain America and the Falcon. After learning Jakar's true nature and his intent to use the children's souls to revive his comatose race, Batroc feels that his sense of honor had been violated by the deception, and aids Captain America and Falcon in rescuing the children.

Batroc has a daughter, Marie, who is teamed in villainy with the daughter of similar B-list supervillain Tarantula. Both daughters take their fathers' respective costumes and titles. Taskmaster expresses his shock that Tarantula and Batroc are heterosexual before soundly beating the two villains' offspring. Taskmaster tosses Marie and Tarantula off a building before shooting and killing them.

Batroc is among the group of villains forcibly drafted into Helmut Zemo's Thunderbolts army. After returning to federal custody, Batroc registers with the Superhuman Registration Act. Batroc is sent to a superhuman training facility located at Marine Corps Base Quantico in Virginia to train recruits in the martial arts before being transferred over to Camp Hammond. Batroc finds government work unsatisfactory and returns to villainy.

In the series The Unbelievable Gwenpool, Batroc encounters Gwenpool, who originates from a world similar to the real world. Batroc is surprised to realise from Gwen's information that he remembers nothing from before his first fight with Captain America, with Gwen explaining that he did not exist before that point due to it being his first appearance. Batroc decides to make Gwen less of a liability by teaching her actual combat moves and the use of weapons, allowing her to subsequently defeat MODOK.

After Gwen learns her series is coming to an end as a result of choosing to be a hero rather than a villain, erasing an older alternate "evil" version of herself from existence, she convinces Batroc to let her participate in a heist of a casino owned by Chance; having been informed of Gwen's newfound ability to manipulate reality, Batroc has Gwen catch the sound effects as he kicks in the door of Chance's safe, allowing him to do so silently, before escaping with Chance's gold upon being caught by him. Gwen is touched when Batroc reveals that he had put money aside for her into legitimate accounts, and believes life as a hero is better for her than the mercenary life he lives. Accepting her series' cancellation and that future Marvel Comics writers will not provide Batroc the same characterisation he has had in The Unbelievable Gwenpool, instead relegating him to being a henchman and minor antagonist, Gwen bids farewell to him and prepares to face oblivion. Over a finale montage set over several decades, Batroc joins Gwen in confronting MODOK when he returns from space and remains in contact with her.

During the "King in Black" storyline, Batroc the Leaper is among the villains recruited by Mayor Wilson Fisk to join his Thunderbolts during Knull's invasion.

== Powers and abilities ==
Batroc the Leaper has no superhuman abilities, but is in peak physical condition in every respect. He is an Olympic-level weightlifter and has extraordinary agility and reflexes. His leg muscles are particularly well developed, enabling him to leap great distances equal to an Olympic athlete. He is an expert martial artist and hand-to-hand combatant who specializes in savate, and he is also adept at other martial arts such as Krav Maga. He is also skilled in parkour. Batroc is a skilled military tactician, having formerly been in the French Foreign Legion.

Batroc is also an experienced thief and smuggler who can speak both French and English.

== Other versions ==
=== Ultimate Marvel ===
An alternate universe version of Batroc the Leaper appears in Ultimate Comics: Spider-Man #13.

=== MC2 ===
An alternate universe version of Batroc the Leaper appears in the MC2 imprint. This version is the head of a criminal syndicate.

=== Marvel Zombies ===
A zombified alternate universe version of Batroc the Leaper appears in Marvel Zombies 3, where he is killed by Absorbing Man.

=== House of M ===
An alternate universe version of Batroc the Leaper appears in "House of M". This version is a member of the Hood's criminal empire until he is killed in an attack by Toad and S.H.I.E.L.D. forces.

=== Deadpool Kills the Marvel Universe Again ===
An alternate universe version of Batroc the Leaper appears in Deadpool Kills the Marvel Universe Again, where he is killed by Deadpool.

== In other media ==
=== Television ===
- Batroc the Leaper appears in the "Captain America" segment of The Marvel Super Heroes, voiced by Gillie Fenwick.
- Batroc the Leaper appears in The Super Hero Squad Show episode "Stranger From a Savage Land!", voiced by A. J. Buckley. This version is a member of Doctor Doom's Lethal Legion.
- Batroc the Leaper appears in Black Panther, voiced by JB Blanc.
- Batroc the Leaper makes a non-speaking cameo appearance in The Avengers: Earth's Mightiest Heroes episode "The Big House" as an inmate of the titular prison.
- Batroc the Leaper appears in Ultimate Spider-Man, voiced by Rob Paulsen. This version utilizes a pair of leg bracers that enhance his kicking and leaping power. He is also capable of scaling vertical walls, provided that they have footholds for him to brace his feet against. In the fourth season, Hydra provides Batroc with a full-body energy exoskeleton.
- Batroc the Leaper makes a non-speaking cameo appearance in the Hulk and the Agents of S.M.A.S.H. episode "Savage Land".

=== Marvel Cinematic Universe ===
Georges Batroc appears in media set in the Marvel Cinematic Universe, portrayed by Georges St-Pierre. This version is an Algerian mercenary and pirate.

- Batroc first appears in the film Captain America: The Winter Soldier, wherein he hijacks a S.H.I.E.L.D. ship until a strike team led by Steve Rogers and Natasha Romanoff neutralize and arrest Batroc and his men. Nick Fury later reveals to Rogers that he hired Batroc to take the ship to give him an excuse to send Romanoff on board so she could steal confidential S.H.I.E.L.D. files pointing to a Hydra conspiracy.
- Batroc appears in the miniseries The Falcon and the Winter Soldier, wherein he allies with Karli Morgenthau and the Flag Smashers to seek revenge on Sam Wilson for foiling a heist of his before being killed by Sharon Carter for attempting to extort her.
- St-Pierre voices an alternate timeline version of Batroc in the Disney+ animated series What If...? episode "What If... the Watcher Broke His Oath?".

=== Video games ===
- Batroc the Leaper appears as a mini-boss in Spider-Man and Captain America in Doctor Doom's Revenge.
- Batroc the Leaper appears as a mini-boss in Marvel Avengers Alliance.
- Batroc the Leaper appears as a mini-boss in Marvel Heroes.

=== Miscellaneous ===
Batroc the Leaper appears in the motion comic Marvel Video Comics: Training Day, voiced by Mark Oliver.

=== Merchandise ===
Batroc the Leaper received an action figure in Hasbro's Marvel Legends toy line.

== See also ==
- Savate

== Reception ==
Batroc the Leaper has been noted as an underwhelming villain.
