= List of New Warriors members =

New Warriors is a team of comic book superheroes in the Marvel Comics universe. Over the years it has featured many characters in a variety of combinations.

== Founding members (vol. 1) ==
Each of these members first appeared as a New Warrior in Thor #411. Their founding was chronicled in New Warriors (vol. 1) #1, published after their first appearance as a team.

Character	Alter ego	Joined in	Notes
Firestar	Angelica Jones	New Warriors (vol. 1) #1	Joined Avengers in Avengers (vol. 3) #4. Retired in Civil War: Front Line #2. Currently a member of the X-Men.
Justice a.k.a. Marvel Boy	Vance Astrovik	New Warriors (vol. 1) #1	Justice from issue #43 onwards. Joined Avengers in Avengers (vol. 3) #4. Former teacher at the Initiative program. Former leader of Counter Force, which has reclaimed the New Warriors name. Former teacher at the Avengers Academy.
Namorita a.k.a. Kymaera	Namorita Prentiss	New Warriors (vol. 1) #1	Took over leadership of team when original Night Thrasher quit for a time. Died in Civil War #1, but a time-displaced Namorita was rescued from the timestream by Nova.
Night Thrasher	Dwayne Taylor	New Warriors (vol. 1) #1	Also first chronological appearance. Original leader of New Warriors. Died in Civil War #1. Resurrected in Contest of Champions #5.
Nova a.k.a. Kid Nova	Richard Rider	New Warriors (vol. 1) #1	Leader of the Nova Corps. A former member of the Secret Avengers. Deceased in Thanos Imperative #6, but resurrected in Nova vol. 6 #11.
Speedball a.k.a. Penance	Robert "Robbie" Baldwin	New Warriors (vol. 1) #1	The lone survivor of the Stamford disaster in Civil War #1. Went by the name 'Penance' for a time. Former teacher at Avengers Academy.

== New members (vol. 1) ==
Character	Alter ego	Joined in	Notes
Silhouette	Silhouette Chord	New Warriors (vol. 1) #14	Started association with team in issue #2. Leaves in issue #51. Rejoins in vol. 5, issue 8.
Darkhawk	Chris Powell	New Warriors (vol. 1) #22	Reserve member and former West Coast Avenger. Former member of the Loners. Later Joins the New Avengers.
Rage	Elvin Haliday	New Warriors (vol. 1) #26	Former Avenger and recruit with the Initiative program. Former member of Counter Force, who assumed the New Warriors name in Avengers: The Initiative #22.
Hindsight Lad aka Hindsight	Carlton LaFroyge	New Warriors (vol. 1) #48	Blackmails his way onto team in New Warriors (vol. 1) #37. Accepted as full member in issue #51. Kicked off of the team in She-Hulk (vol. 3) #8 following events in Civil War #1.
Bandit aka Night Thrasher	Donyell Taylor	New Warriors (vol. 1) #48	Forms reserve team. Leaves with Silhouette in #51. Forms a team of New Warriors and becomes its leader for a time. Formerly known as Night Thrasher and second in command of Counter Force.
Dagger	Tandy Bowen	New Warriors (vol. 1) #48	Reserve member. Declined full membership in issues #35 and #51. Former member of Dark X-Men.
Turbo	Michiko "Mickey" Musashi	New Warriors (vol. 1) #48	Informal reserve member from issue #35 onwards. Official reserve member from issue #48 to #60. Accepts full membership in #60 onwards. Member of the Loners.
Turbo	Michael Brent Jeffries	New Warriors (vol. 1) #48	Informal reserve member. Never actually offered membership on panel. Deceased.
Powerpax aka Alex Power, aka Powerhouse	Alexander "Alex" Power	New Warriors (vol. 1) #48	Reserve member from issue #48 to #60. Accepts full membership from issue #60 to #75. Leaves team to rejoin Power Pack, becoming Zero-G. Currently a member of the Future Foundation.
Speedball	Darrion Grobe	New Warriors (vol. 1) #50	Time-traveler living in a cloned body of Speedball with the powers, personality, and memories of the original. He replaced the original Speedball while he was trapped in another dimension from issue #50 to issue #71. Deceased.
Scarlet Spider aka Spider-Man, aka Jackal	Ben Reilly	New Warriors (vol. 1) #62	Killed by the Green Goblin in Peter Parker, Spider-Man (vol. 1) #75. Later resurrected in The Amazing Spider-Man (vol. 4) #1.
Helix	Rafael Carago	New Warriors (vol. 1) #68	Reserve member.
Timeslip	Rina Patel	New Warriors (vol. 1) #72	Possibly depowered as of issue #75, though she was seen in costume after M-Day.

=== Interim recruits ===
These members joined the team between the end of Vol. 1 and the first dissolution of the team.

Character	Alter ego	Joined in	Notes
Slapstick	Steve Harmon	A flashback in Avengers: The Initiative #10	Former recruit in the Initiative Program. A flashback in Avengers: The Initiative #10 reveals Slapstick joined the team sometime between the end of Vol. 1 and the first dissolution of the team. Former member of Counter Force, who assumed the New Warriors name in Avengers: The Initiative #22.
Ultra Girl	Suzanna "Suzy" Lauren Sherman	A flashback in Avengers: The Initiative #10	Graduated recruit from the Initiative Program. A flashback in Avengers: The Initiative #10 reveals Ultra Girl joined the team sometime between the end of Vol. 1 and the first dissolution of the team. Rejoined in Avengers: The Initiative #23.

== New members (vol. 2) ==
Character	Alter ego	Joined in	Notes
Aegis	Trey Rollins	New Warriors (vol. 2) #1	Also first appearance. Killed by the Huntsman in The Incredible Hercules #127.
Bolt	Chris Bradley	New Warriors (vol. 2) #1	First appeared in X-Men Unlimited #8. Also a member of Cable's Underground as Maverick. Bolt was killed by Agent Zero, the first Maverick, but revived with a techno-organic virus by Selene. It is unknown if he remained alive afterward.

== New members (vol. 3) ==
Character	Alter ego	Joined in	Notes
Microbe	Zachary Smith	New Warriors (vol. 3) #1	Also first appearance. Dies in Civil War #1.
Debrii	Deborah Fields	New Warriors (vol. 3) #4	Also first appearance. Leaves in New Warriors (vol. 3) #6. Former recruit of the Initiative Program. Former member of Counter Force, who assumed the New Warriors name in Avengers: The Initiative #22.

== New members (vol. 4) ==
These members were all former mutants who lost their powers after M-Day, and were either affiliated with the X-Men or students at the Xavier Institute.

Character	Alter ego	Joined in	Notes
Wondra	Jubilation Lee	Joined Bandit's offshoot team between vol. 3 and vol. 4	Previously known as Jubilee. Transformed into a vampire in X-Men (volume 2) #1.
Blackwing	Barnell Bohusk	Joined Bandit's offshoot team between vol. 3 and vol. 4	Previously known as Beak.
Decibel	Jonothon Starsmore	Joined Bandit's offshoot team between vol. 3 and vol. 4	Previously known as Chamber. Restored back to his original powers following the events that occurred during the Age of X.
Tempest	Angel Salvadore	Joined Bandit's offshoot team between vol. 3 and vol. 4	Previously known as Angel.
Ripcord	Miranda Leevald	Joined Bandit's offshoot team between vol. 3 and vol. 4	Previously known as Stacy X. Presumed killed in New Warriors (vol. 4) #16, but returned as Stacy X in Vengeance.
Skybolt	Vincent "Vin" Stewart	Joined Bandit's offshoot team between vol. 3 and vol. 4	Previously known as Redneck. Killed in New Warriors (vol. 4) #16
Phaser	Christian Cord	Joined Bandit's offshoot team between vol. 3 and vol. 4	Previously known as Radian. Brother of Longstrike.
Longstrike	Christine Cord	Joined Bandit's offshoot team between vol. 3 and vol. 4	Previously known as Tattoo. Sister of Phaser. Dies in New Warriors (vol. 4) #4.
Renascence	Sofia Mantega	Joined in New Warriors (vol. 4) #6.	Previously known as Wind Dancer. Former member and squad leader of the New Mutants.

== Dark Reign ==
These members joined after the dissolution, in issue #20, of the team featured in Vol. 4.

Character	Alter ego	Joined in	Notes
Scarlet Spider	Michael	Avengers: The Initiative #21	Clone of Michael Van Patrick. Former member of the Shadow Initiative. Killed by Ragnarok in Avengers: The Initiative #22.
Scarlet Spider	Patrick	Avengers: The Initiative #21	Clone of Michael Van Patrick. Former member of the Shadow Initiative.

== New Warriors (vol. 5) ==
Another New Warriors series was launched in 2014 as part of the second Marvel Now! wave.

Character	Alter ego	Joined in	Notes
Nova	Sam Alexander	Nova (vol. 5) #10	
Scarlet Spider	Kaine Parker	New Warriors (vol. 5) #1	Clone of Peter Parker
Sun Girl	Selah Burke	New Warriors (vol. 5) #1	
Haechi	Mark Sim	New Warriors (vol. 5) #1	Member of the Inhumans
Water Snake	Faira Sar Namora	New Warriors (vol. 5) #1	
Hummingbird	Aracely Penalba	New Warriors (vol. 5) #1	

== Support staff ==
Character	Alter ego	Joined in	Notes
Tai		New Warriors (vol. 1) #1	New Warriors trainer/housekeeper. Dies in New Warriors (vol. 1) #25.
Chord	Andrew Chord	New Warriors (vol. 1) #1	New Warriors trainer/mentor/pilot.
Sprocket	Amelia Barnhardt	New Warriors (vol. 1) #29	New Warriors pilot.
Grace		New Warriors (vol.4) #3	New Warriors tech support.
Kaz		New Warriors (vol.4) #3	New Warriors tech support.
Aja		New Warriors (vol. 4) #10	New Warriors tech support.

== See also ==
- New Warriors
- List of New Warriors issues
