= The New Warriors =

Several American comic book series

- Cover to New Warriors #75, the double-sized finale to the series' run. Pencils by Patrick Zircher.

Publication information
- Publisher: Marvel Comics
- Schedule: Monthly (vol. 1–2, 4, 5); Ongoing series (vol. 3); Limited series
- Format: Ongoing series
- Genre: Superhero
- Publication date: vol. 1 (July 1990 - September 1996) vol. 2 (October 1999 - July 2000) vol. 3 (August 2005 - February 2006) vol. 4 (August 2007 - March 2009) vol. 5 (February 2014 - January 2015)
- No. of issues: (vol. 1): 75 + 4 annuals + 1 ashcan (vol. 2): 10 + 1 Wizard exclusive (vol. 3): 6 (vol. 4): 20 (vol. 5): 12
- Main character: New Warriors

Creative team
- Written by: (vol. 1): Fabian Nicieza; Evan Skolnick (vol. 2): Jay Faerber (vol. 3): Zeb Wells (vol. 4): Kevin Grevioux (vol. 5): Christopher Yost
- Penciller(s): (vol. 1): Mark Bagley; Darick Robertson; Patrick Zircher (vol. 2): Steve Scott; Jamal Igle (vol. 3): Skottie Young (vol. 4): Paco Medina; Reilly Brown (vol. 5): Marcus To; Nick Roche

Collected editions
- New Warriors Classic: Volume 1: ISBN 0-7851-3742-4

The New Warriors is the name of several comic book titles featuring the team the New Warriors and published by Marvel Comics, beginning with the original The New Warriors comic book series which debuted in 1990.

The team made a cameo appearance in The Mighty Thor #411 (December 1989) and made their full debut in The Mighty Thor #412. Over the years, the New Warriors, in their various incarnations, have been featured in five different volumes.

The first volume was a 75-issue comic series. The second volume of New Warriors was published in 1999–2000 and ran for 11 issues before being cancelled. The third volume of the New Warriors was a six-issue mini-series that sees the superhero team cast as the stars of their own reality TV show and ultimately led to Marvel's Civil War crossover in 2006 and 2007. The fourth New Warriors series was published from 2007 to 2009 and lasted for 20 issues. The fifth New Warriors series was launched as part of the All-New Marvel NOW! initiative in 2014. The book lasted for 12 issues before being cancelled.

== Publication history ==
=== The New Warriors (vol. 1) ===
The New Warriors first appeared in issues 411 and 412 of the Marvel Comics title The Mighty Thor. The team was compiled by writer/editor Tom DeFalco, consisting of the young superheroes Firestar, Marvel Boy, Namorita, Nova, and Speedball, all of whom were once featured in solo series or were supporting characters in more established series. To this mix DeFalco added Night Thrasher, an original character to serve as the team's founder and leader.

The New Warriors were featured in an eponymous series from 1990 until 1996, written by Fabian Nicieza with art by Mark Bagley. Nicieza wrote the series for the first 53 issues. The series lasted for 75 issues and four annuals, spinning off a number of titles, including mini-series featuring Night Thrasher and Marvel Boy (by then renamed Justice) and ongoing series with Nova and Night Thrasher.

=== The New Warriors (vol. 2) ===
A short-lived relaunch began in 1999 and ran for 11 issues. It was written by Jay Faerber and pencilled by a variety of artists, including Steve Scott, Karl Kerschl, and Jamal Igle. Faerber and Igle would go on to collaborate on several other projects. Original members Namorita, Nova, and Speedball were joined by returning member Turbo and new members Bolt and Aegis. The last was an all-new character, reminiscent of Night Thrasher. A promotional issue #0 was given away with Wizard Magazine.

=== The New Warriors (vol. 3) ===
A six issue mini-series of the title was released starting in June 2005, written by Zeb Wells and illustrated by Skottie Young. It features the New Warriors as the stars of a reality television show to fund their team. The line-up includes previous members Namorita, Night Thrasher, Nova, and Speedball, along with new character Microbe. A second new character, Debrii, joins in issue 4. A trade paperback collection of all six issues was released in January 2006.

=== New Warriors (vol. 4) ===
A fourth series was launched in June 2007. It spun off of events in the Civil War storyline, in which Namorita, Night Thrasher, and Microbe were killed in an explosion caused by Nitro. The series stars Night Thrasher (Donyell Taylor, brother of the original Night Thrasher) and former X-Men members Redneck, Angel Salvadore, Chamber, Radian, Wind Dancer, Stacy X, Jubilee, Tattoo, and Beak, who lost their powers during the events of House of M. All of the members take on new codenames and use technology to make up for their lack of powers.

=== New Warriors (vol. 5) ===
New Warriors was launched in February 2014 as part of All-New Marvel NOW! with Chris Yost as the writer and Marcus To as the main artist. New Warriors Volume 5 ended with issue 12. The team consists of established member Speedball as well as Kaine Parker, Hummingbird, Sun Girl, Nova (Sam Alexander), and new characters Haechi and Water Snake.

=== New Warriors (2020, unreleased) ===
Marvel Comics announced that on March 17, 2020, a new version of the team would appear, this time with new characters forming the New Warriors: Screentime, Snowflake, Safespace, B-Negative, and Trailblazer. The direction of the new characters – particularly the use of pejorative internet slang in names as well as the perceived political agenda of the writing – was met with considerable backlash from online audiences.

The title was removed from ComiXology, with both Marvel and series creators Daniel Kibblesmith and Luciano Vecchio refusing to comment on the future or cancellation of the comic. Despite the series' cancellation, B-Negative made a cameo appearance in the one-shot Darkhold: Blade, also written by Kibblesmith.

== Collected editions ==
The series have been collected into a number of trade paperbacks:

- New Warriors (vol. 1):
  - Beginnings (collects The New Warriors (vol. 1) #1–4 and Thor #411–412), June 1992, ISBN 0-87135-916-2
  - New Warriors Classic: Volume 1 (collects The New Warriors (vol. 1) #1–6 and Thor #411–412), 208 pages, August 2009, ISBN 0-7851-3742-4
  - New Warriors Classic: Volume 2 (collects The New Warriors (vol. 1) #7–10, Annual #1; New Mutants Annual (vol.1) #7, Uncanny X-Men Annual #15 and X-Factor Annual (vol.1) #6), 256 pages, May 2009, ISBN 0-7851-4263-0
  - New Warriors Classic: Volume 3 (collects The New Warriors (vol. 1) #11–17 and Avengers (vol.1) #341–342), October 2011
  - Spider-Man and New Warriors: Hero Killers (collects New Warriors Annual #2, Amazing Spider-Man Annual #26, Web of Spider-Man Annual #8, The Spectacular Spider-Man Annual #12)
  - New Warriors: Darkness and Light (collects New Warriors (Vol. 1) #27–36, New Warriors Annual #3, Night Thrasher: Four Control #1–4, material from Marvel Holiday Special 1992), 2018, (ISBN 978-1302913717)
  - X-Force: Child's Play (New Warriors #45–46), August 2012
  - Spider-Man: The Complete Clone Saga Epic Book 4 (New Warriors #61), 2010, ISBN 978-0785149552
  - Spider-Man: The Complete Clone Saga Epic Book 5 (New Warriors #62–64), 2011, ISBN 978-0785150091
  - Spider-Man: The Complete Ben Reilly Epic Book 1 (New Warriors #65–66), 2011, ISBN 978-0785155454
  - Spider-Man: Clone Saga Omnibus Vol. 2 (New Warriors #61–66), 2017, ISBN 978-1302907983
  - Spider-Man: The Complete Ben Reilly Epic Book 2 (New Warriors #67), 2011
  - Spider-Man: Ben Reilly Omnibus Vol. 1 (New Warriors #67), 2019, (ISBN 978-1302913854)
  - New Warriors Omnibus Vol. 1 (collects New Warriors (vol. 1) #1–26, New Warriors Annual #1–2, Avengers #341–342, material from Thor #411–412, New Mutants Annual #7, Uncanny X-Men Annual #15, X-Factor Annual #6, Amazing Spider-Man Annual #26, Spectacular Spider-Man Annual #12, Web of Spider-Man Annual #8)
- New Warriors: Reality Check (collects The New Warriors (vol. 3) #1–6), 144 pages, March 2006, ISBN 0-7851-1661-3
- New Warriors (vol. 4):
  - Defiant (collects New Warriors (vol. 4) #1–6), 144 pages, January 2008, ISBN 0-7851-2674-0
  - Thrashed (collects New Warriors (vol. 4) #7–13), 168 pages, September 2008), ISBN 0-7851-2675-9
  - Secret Invasion (collects New Warriors (vol. 4) #14–20), 176 pages, March 2009, ISBN 0-7851-3176-0
- New Warriors (vol. 5):
  - The Kids Are All Fight (collects New Warriors (vol. 5) #1–6), 136 pages, August 2014, ISBN 0785154531
  - Always and Forever (collects New Warriors (vol. 5) #7–12), 136 pages, January 2015), ISBN 078515454X
