= Robbie Baldwin =

Fictional character appearing in American comic books published by Marvel Comics

- Speedball on the cover of Speedball #6 (February 1989) by Steve Ditko.

Publication information
- Publisher: Marvel Comics
- First appearance: As Speedball: The Amazing Spider-Man Annual #22 (January 1988); As Penance: Civil War: Front Line #10 (January 2007)
- Created by: Speedball: Steve Ditko; Tom DeFalco; Penance: Paul Jenkins; Steve Lieber

In-story information
- Alter ego: Robert "Robbie" Baldwin
- Species: Human mutate
- Team affiliations: New Warriors; Damage Control; Avengers Academy; Thunderbolts; Shadow Initiative
- Notable aliases: Speedball; Penance; Masked Marvel
- Abilities: Hyperkinetic shockwave; Kinetic energy field

Robert "Robbie" Baldwin is a superhero appearing in American comic books published by Marvel Comics. Created by artist Steve Ditko and writer Tom DeFalco, the character first appeared in The Amazing Spider-Man Annual #22 (January 1988) originally known as Speedball, as well as in Civil War: Front Line #10 (January 2007) as Penance.

The character's origin and early exploits as Speedball were depicted soon after in a solo series. After that series was cancelled, he appeared as a member of the superhero team the New Warriors, in the monthly title of the same name. In the Marvel Comics crossover Civil War, the character changes his name and appearance to Penance after most of the New Warriors are killed. Following this change, he is a member of the Thunderbolts. As of the first issue of Avengers Academy, he has reverted to Speedball and a modified version of his original costume.

== Creation ==
Defalco spoke on the creation of the character stating, "I came up with the original idea for the character and wrote a bible on him which included his origin, his powers, personality, family dynamic, and everything else you needed to know in order to write a story about him. Steve designed the costume and also designed Robbie himself...I originally called him Ricochet and presented him to Jim Shooter for the New Universe and told me we should eventually do him in for the Marvel Universe... I changed the name. I didn't like the way Ricochet looked as a logo and thought Speedball was much more descriptive"

== Publication history ==
Created by artist Steve Ditko and writer Tom DeFalco, The character first appeared in The Amazing Spider-Man Annual #22 (January 1988), originally known as Speedball.

Marvel Comics published ten issues of the monthly comic book series Speedball from 1988 to 1989. The series was primarily plotted and penciled by Steve Ditko who also supplied the covers. It was scripted by Roger Stern and inked by several different artists.

After the series' cancellation, the Speedball character primarily appeared in New Warriors and its related comics, written primarily by Fabian Nicieza. Speedball continued to be the most consistent character through the second and third volumes of the New Warriors. During his run on New Warriors, Fabian Nicieza commented:

I hope everyone has realized that I love Speedball. He's one of the few spandex folks out there that really enjoys what he's doing. Through Speedball, I get to make pointed comments and references to what's going on around him, which is great fun, using his cockiness and his arrogance, but playing on his insecurity at the same time. I'm proud of the fact that I've managed to make the character that scared so many people away from New Warriors popular enough to get his own mini-series. (Note: Nicieza is most likely referring to a Speedball/Rage miniseries which was being worked on the time, but was never published.) Speedball's a major part of the book now, and that's something that I, [penciler] Mark Bagley, [editor] Danny Fingeroth, [penciler] Darick Robertson, and [inker] Larry Mahlstedt are all really proud of. It's hard to change public opinion, but I think we've given it a good shot. [emphasis in original]

The character is featured in Paul Jenkins's Civil War: Front Line, after it was revealed that he was the only member of the New Warriors to survive the Stamford disaster. The character underwent a drastic change in this series, in which his powers alter and takes the name Penance, joining the Thunderbolts. He would also feature in his own limited series Penance: Relentless, also written by Jenkins, which examines the background to these changes.

He appears as a supporting character in Avengers Academy #1-20 (Aug 2010-Dec 2011), back in his Speedball persona. After recruiting Sam Alexander, Speedball became part of the 2014 incarnation of the New Warriors.

== Fictional character biography ==
Robbie Baldwin was born in Springdale, Connecticut to mother Madeline, who co-starred in a soap opera with Mary Jane Watson and subsequently became a teacher, and father Justin, a successful district attorney. As a high school student, Robbie gains superpowers after an accident at the Hammond Research Laboratory where he works part-time as a laboratory worker. When Hammond scientists try to tap into a mysterious other-dimensional energy source, the energy bombards Baldwin. Baldwin survives the experience but finds himself surrounded by energy bubbles and clad in an odd costume.

Minutes afterwards, during a battle with some thieves who want to raid the lab, Baldwin discovers that his body now generates a kinetic energy field that protects him from impact and makes him a bouncing dynamo of kinetic energy. Calling himself Speedball, Baldwin becomes a crime-fighter in his hometown. Baldwin's parents have marital problems while he secretly leads his double life. This situation leads to domestic stress that escalates over time, driven partly by the conflict between Robbie and his father, who as district attorney is expected to uphold Springdale's ordinance against costumed superheroes and has an extreme prejudice against these "vigilantes".

The energy source also affects Niels, a cat belonging to one of the scientists, giving him the same powers. Speedball makes a number of attempts to catch the cat, hoping that study of Niels would give him better control of his powers. He would later learn that a villainous scientist, Clyde, was also after the cat, hoping to gain Speedball-like powers, and had allegedly created most of the supervillains in Springdale to this end. Speedball would later adopt the cat, who under the name of Hairball, would eventually have its own super adventures with the Pet Avengers.

=== The New Warriors ===
While shopping in New York City with his mother, Robbie Baldwin joins a battle between Terrax and a number of superheroes. The heroes become the founding members of the New Warriors, and Baldwin agrees to join the team. The commute from Connecticut to the team's headquarters in New York City is difficult and Baldwin is frequently late for Night Thrasher's formal meetings. With the New Warriors, he battles Psionex. He eventually reveals his double identity to the New Warriors, and when Speedball and the New Warriors battle the Force of Nature shortly afterwards, his mother also learns of his superhero identity. His father learns the truth some time later.

After Baldwin's mother discovers his secret identity, his parents' marriage ends and Baldwin moves permanently to New York City. Baldwin finds friendship with all of his fellow New Warriors, but his closest friendships are with Nova and Rage. After Baldwin is transported to the dimension his powers derive from, Darrion Grobe joins the New Warriors as Speedball, although the other members think he is Baldwin. Baldwin returns from the kinetic dimension and begins a brief relationship with Timeslip.

=== "Civil War" ===
At the beginning of the "Civil War" storyline, the New Warriors attempt to apprehend a group of supervillains in Stamford, Connecticut, for their television reality show. Nitro, one of the criminals, creates an explosive blast that kills 612 civilians, including 60 children, as well as the New Warriors with the exception of Robbie Baldwin. This event triggers the push for superhero registration at the heart of "Civil War". Baldwin is presumed dead after the incident, but he is found alive after the blast launches him over 500 miles (800 km); his kinetic field kept him alive, but was "burned out" as a result.

After awakening from a coma, Baldwin is arrested by S.H.I.E.L.D. Reed Richards offers Baldwin the chance to testify before Congress, but he is shot by an assailant at the Capitol building. Although bullet fragments remain inoperably lodged near his spine, Baldwin recovers from the wound. It is later revealed that Baldwin's powers are now activated by pain. Baldwin orders a new suit of armor featuring 612 internal spikes, which represent the victims of explosion in Stanford and allow him to trigger his powers.

=== Thunderbolts ===
Robbie Baldwin as Penance. Art by Marko Djurdjevic.

Baldwin rechristens himself Penance and is assigned to the Thunderbolts. During the team's mission to capture Steel Spider, Penance suffers a mental breakdown. Found by teammate Radioactive Man, Penance is eventually brought back to the Thunderbolts Mountain, where he brutally assaults a prisoner who taunted him for his role in the Stamford tragedy. Osborn nearly kills Baldwin, but the team's field leader Moonstone persuades Osborn that Baldwin could be manipulated and exploited as a Hulk-level enforcer for Osborn's schemes.

Because of Baldwin's increasing instability, Doc Samson arrives at Thunderbolts headquarters to provide additional psychiatric assistance. This foils Moonstone's plan to be Baldwin's therapist and exploit his fragile mental state to her own ends. Samson helps Penance focus his powers back to their original state.

Ultimately, Baldwin deserts the Thunderbolts, although they pursue him. Baldwin eludes them, and with Wolverine's help, he travels to Latveria to retrieve Nitro to stand trial for mass murder. During this adventure, Baldwin steals the fortune of Mendel Stromm, Norman Osborn's former employee and rival. Baldwin confronts Doctor Doom as part of his quest. Doom eventually concedes the fight and relinquishes Nitro after realizing that defeating Baldwin would force him to tap into Latveria's secret nuclear power plants, potentially revealing their existence to the outside world. After secretly donating Stromm's fortune to charity for the rebuilding of Stamford, Baldwin traps Nitro in his Penance suit and arranges to receive a new suit with fewer spikes.

=== Avengers Initiative ===
Penance, brainwashed and heavily drugged, is persuaded by Norman Osborn to join his new Initiative, at Camp H.A.M.M.E.R., and has psychotherapy sessions with Trauma. Through Trauma's "pet therapy" method, Penance is unknowingly reunited with his cat Niels. When the Avengers Resistance, consisting of many of Penance's New Warriors teammates, come to Camp H.A.M.M.E.R. seeking to release a captured teammate, Taskmaster orders Penance to attack them. Their fight is interrupted by Nightmare having taken over the body of his son Trauma. Nightmare forces Penance to remember the Stamford incident, causing him to pass out in mental anguish. Tigra revives him, using her powers of empathy to help him see Trauma's predicament. With this knowledge, Penance is able to talk Trauma into freeing himself from his father's control. Penance helps the Avengers Resistance escape Osborn's forces by rupturing a gas main. Vance Astrovik (Justice) offers for Penance to rejoin their team, but he refuses, not wanting his old friends to see how much he had changed.

=== "Heroic Age" ===
During the "Heroic Age," Robbie Baldwin returns to using the Speedball identity as part of the Avengers Academy's teaching staff.

=== Fear Itself ===
During the "Fear Itself" storyline, Speedball takes the Avengers Academy students on a field trip to the memorial for the people who died during the Stamford incident. They are attacked by a group called "the Cobalt Men", named after Cobalt Man - one of the villains who died at Stamford. Not wanting them to ruin the memorial of the dead, Speedball quickly defeats them using his enhanced Penance powers. Speedball later admits he cuts himself to store up the energy he uses as Penance because this power is more useful in a fight. He acknowledges that he should not have kept this a secret, and Hank Pym offers to help him find a better way to activate those powers. He later confronts Kuurth, Nerkodd, and a hate group founded by Sin called the Sisters of Sin. After this, he cheers up a little and regains his sense of humor. After returning to the Avengers Academy, Speedball announces to the students and teachers that he is quitting the faculty, but still offers to help them anytime.

=== New Warriors: The New Team ===
Having taken to the road again, Speedball and Justice find themselves in the town of New Salem, Colorado, where they meet the Salem's Seven. They fight, but quickly patch things up after it is clear it was a misunderstanding. While Speedball plays video games with Brutacus, Justice speaks with Vertigo, leader of Salem's Seven, about the town. When the conversation deviates to Justice's and Speedball's intention of reforming the New Warriors and the difficulties that that will probably bring due to the persisting bad reputation for their involvement in the Civil War events, the Evolutionaries arrive, intent on burning down the town. Justice, Speedball, and Salem's Seven drive them off. Their subsequent mission to stop the Evolutionaries leads to their recruiting of two heroes to the cause, Haechi and Sun Girl.

Looking for Nova but seeing he does not answer his phone, Speedball and the others head back to the Salem's Seven and through their help and that of New Salem's magical inhabitants, they locate the boy. As it turns out, Nova along with Hummingbird, Scarlet Spider, and Faira Sar Namora, had been kidnapped by the Evolutionaries and the High Evolutionary. Rushing, they arrive as the Evolutionaries are about to execute Nova, following his and the other prisoners' attempt to break out. Trying to reason with the High Evolutionary fails and Nova reveals his plan of eliminating "mostly everyone". A chaotic fight ensues, with the prisoners, Sun Girl, Haechi and the New Warriors forming an impromptu team that manages to defeat the Evolutionaries. Shortly after, when the High Evolutionary activates his machine to eliminate the super-powered population of Earth, Speedball and the others are brought down to their knees in excruciating pain and almost die, but they are all saved by Sun Girl who, as a normal human, is immune to the machine and destroys it. With the enemy fleeing but fearing its return, an invitation is made to everyone to join Speedball, Justice and Nova as New Warriors to face the High Evolutionary should he try to repeat his scheme - an invitation that is immediately declined, save for Hummingbird and Sun Girl.

While Justice takes Scarlet Spider and Faira on the task of cleaning the mountain of the High Evolutionary's hostile contraptions and robots, Speedball takes Sun Girl, Hummingbird, and Haechi to a nearby town - with the excuse that it had been attacked - to have dinner and to take an opportunity to better know his new teammates. When the topic of everyone's abilities is discussed and Speedball clarifies his capacity to "bounce", Hummingbird suddenly starts to inquire about his other powers, if he still cuts himself and the reasons why. Through her psychic powers, Hummingbird learns that Speedball still perceives himself as Penance, indicating that he still struggles internally with his guilt while keeping a carefree facade to everyone else.

When Haechi and Sun Girl are forcefully taken to Singapore by Inhuman supremacists led by Lash, Speedball and the rest of the New Warriors go to save them, battling through all the floors of a skyscraper filled with innocent, mind-controlled people. As they do so, Robbie asks Scarlet Spider if Hummingbird has said anything about him and jokingly suggests to not believe anything she says because "she is really weird". When Scarlet Spider reprimands him for his timing and asks if Robbie can take anything seriously, Speedball discharges his Penance powers on the remaining mind-controlled adversaries and somberly proclaims "Yes. I can". They battle and defeat Lash's henchmen, who teleport away.

Some time later, the New Warriors locate the High Evolutionary to stop him from continuing to pursue his plan. With great coordination, they expertly board his ship, defeat his last Evolutionaries and trap him. It is then that the Eternals appear to ensure the High Evolutionary fulfills his agenda and prevent the Celestials from judging and destroying Earth. As the situation turns for the worse, Robbie coldly assess each of his teammates and sees they are fighting a losing battle. Nevertheless, he throws his best against the Eternals and for a moment manages to inspire the others to do the same and gain the upper hand. Hummingbird then uses her telepathy to discover that the leader of the Eternals, Zuras, was lying, and the Celestials were not coming. This was seemingly in vain, as the New Warriors are defeated and used to power up the machine while Zuras manages to silence them or deflect any suspicion of his persona from his peers.

However, Justice, who had been dealt with separately from the rest of the team, returns to the fight and frees his teammates, damaging the High Evolutionary's machine in the process. Justice then convinces the rest of the Eternals and the High Evolutionary that Zuras had, indeed, been lying. The leader of the Eternals is forced to admit the Celestials were not coming, albeit blaming the attempted genocide entirely on the High Evolutionary with the excuse "he had been tricked by him too". The Eternals leave, warned by the New Warriors not to come back. Robbie is seen happily walking away with the rest of his teammates from the crashed ship.

== Powers and abilities ==
=== As Speedball ===
As a result of the mutagenic effects of irradiation by an unknown form of energy, Robbie Baldwin possesses the superhuman ability to create a kinetic force field of unknown energy, manifested as iridescent bubbles, around himself which absorbs all kinetic energy directed against him and reflects it with even greater force against whatever object with which he is in contact. Hence, if he struck a wall, he would travel at a greater velocity in the opposite direction.

When Speedball uses his superhuman powers, solid force bubbles of residual kinetic field energy appear on his body and, when he bounces, in his wake. While bouncing, he is immune to any kind of harm caused by physical contact. Speedball's power activates automatically when any physical contact occurs above a low level that has not yet been precisely determined. When Speedball's kinetic field activates, his body increases in height and mass (drawn from an extradimensional source); he reverts to his normal size and mass on deactivating the field. Early in his career, the slightest touch, such as snapping his fingers, would turn on this field, but he eventually gained conscious control over it. The field repelled all energy that struck it, especially kinetic energy. As such, bullets, punches, and all other physical attacks bounced off him. A side effect of this, though, was that he, too, would bounce in the opposite direction. Baldwin often used this to his advantage, such as purposely running into a wall in order to gain momentum and thus hit an opponent with twice the force.

While with the Warriors, Baldwin gained far greater control over his powers via a combination of experience in battle and Night Thrasher's mentorship off the battlefield. Whereas previously Baldwin could barely bounce in the direction he wanted, he eventually became more proficient at controlling his leaps and using his powers in various ways, such as to deliver impressive blows, and even to project a stream of kinetic energy from his bubble field at a distance. He eventually learned to mentally "throw" the bubbles that surrounded his field to use as concussive force attacks. He was able to somewhat deflect Siena Blaze's electromagnetic attack that "no one short of the Hulk could have withstood", as well as resist the omnipath Gamesmaster's telepathy, one of the few people in the world to do so.

=== As Penance ===
After the events of Stamford, Baldwin believed his powers to be burned out. However, they still exist, but now only manifest when he experiences extreme stimulation, such as intense pain. While his powers are still kinetically based, they no longer appear to manifest as a "bubble field"; rather, his powers seem far more explosive in nature. In order to stimulate his powers, his Penance suit constantly rakes his flesh. Baldwin tolerates this to a masochistic degree, once stating that he would "wear [the suit] all the time if I could." By wearing the suit he has developed a natural tolerance to pain. His suit consists of 612 spikes facing inward, each to represent a person who lost their life in Stamford. 60 of the spikes are longer than the rest, one for each of the children.

Penance can achieve a variety of effects with his newfound powers. The most commonly used are explosive energy blasts from his hands, but he is capable of firing them from any part of his body via the conduits on his spikes. He can create storm-like fields of energy around him capable of harming those around him and smashing objects. He can focus the energy on parts of his body; often on his hands to form superpowerful punches. He can also engulf himself in an energy forcefield which gives him a degree of invulnerability and allows him to levitate off the ground.

== Reception ==
=== Accolades ===
- In 2021, Screen Rant included Robbie Baldwin in their "10 Marvel Superheroes From The '80s Who Should Join The MCU" list.
- In 2022, CBR.com ranked Robbie Baldwin 6th in their "10 Kindest Marvel Villains" list 7th in their "10 Fastest Marvel Sidekicks" list.

== Other versions ==
=== Exiles ===
An alternate universe version of Robbie Baldwin / Speedball appears in Exiles. This version is one of the few remaining heroes after the Hulk and the Annihilation Wave attacked Earth.

=== House of M ===
An alternate universe version of Robbie Baldwin / Speedball appears in House of M as a member of the Wolfpack.

=== Marvel Apes ===
An alternate universe version of Robbie Baldwin / Speedball appears in Marvel Apes. This version is an ape and a member of the Avengers. After Speedball is wounded in battle, he is taken to Earth-616 to be treated. He elects to stay in this universe, explaining that, due to helping humans, he will be shunned if he returns to his own universe.

=== MC2 ===
An alternate universe version of Robbie Baldwin / Speedball appears in the MC2 imprint. This version is a former member of the Avengers.

=== Marvel Team-Up: League of Losers ===
Robbie Baldwin / Speedball appears in the third volume of Marvel Team-Up as part of a group of lesser-known heroes dubbed the "League of Losers". Alongside Gravity, Darkhawk, Dagger, Araña, X-23, Sleepwalker, and Terror, Speedball travels to the future to prevent the villain Chronok from stealing Reed Richards' time machine. After learning that they cannot return to their own time, the group decides to stay in the future, which splits into an alternate universe.

=== Marvel Zombies ===
A zombified alternate universe version of Robbie Baldwin / Speedball appears in the Marvel Zombies series. He is one of the many casualties in the conflict waged against the Silver Surfer, ending up torn apart by the Power Cosmic.

== In other media ==
=== Television ===
- Robbie Baldwin as Speedball makes non-speaking cameo appearances in Fantastic Four as a member of the New Warriors.
- Robbie Baldwin as Speedball makes non-speaking cameo appearances in Ultimate Spider-Man as one of several young superheroes inspired by Spider-Man and observed by S.H.I.E.L.D.
- Robbie Baldwin as Speedball was set to appear in New Warriors, portrayed by Calum Worthy, before it was shelved.

=== Video games ===
- Robbie Baldwin as Speedball makes a cameo appearance in The Amazing Spider-Man: Lethal Foes.
- Robbie Baldwin as Penance appears as a playable character in Marvel: Ultimate Alliance 2, voiced by Benjamin Diskin. In the Wii version, Penance is a founding member of the Thunderbolts.
- Robbie Baldwin as Speedball appears in Marvel Heroes.

=== Card games ===
Speedball, New Warrior appeared in the Magic: The Gathering 2026 Marvel Super Heroes set as a blue/red Legendary Creature.

== Collected editions ==
Title	Material collected	Published date	ISBN
Speedball: The Masked Marvel	Speedball #1-10 and material from Amazing Spider-Man Annual #22, Marvel Age Annual #4, Marvel Comics Presents #14 and 56 and Marvel Super-Heroes #1-2 and #5-6	June 2019	978-1302918767
Penance: Relentless	Penance: Relentless #1-5	June 2008	978-0785128571
Marvel Apes: The Evolution Starts Here	Marvel Apes Special: Speedball and Marvel Apes Specials: Amazing Spider-Monkey, Grunt Line, Prime Eight	October 2009	978-0785139911
