= Redneck (disambiguation) =

A redneck is a white person of lower socioeconomic status in the United States and Canada.

Redneck or rednecks may also refer to:

- Redneck (comics), a comic character
- "Redneck" (song), by Lamb of God
- "Rednecks" (song), by Randy Newman
- Redneck (film), a film starring Telly Savalas and Mark Lester
- Rednek, British dubstep musician
- Red Neck, a H2S reconnaissance radar

== See also ==
- Rednex, a band
