= Night Thrasher (Dwayne Taylor) =

- Night Thrasher: Four Control #4 (January 1993). Cover art by Mark Bagley.

Publication information
- Publisher: Marvel Comics
- First appearance: Thor #411 (December 1989)
- Created by: Tom DeFalco (writer); Ron Frenz (artist)

In-story information
- Alter ego: Dwayne Michael Taylor
- Team affiliations: New Warriors; Taylor Foundation; Folding Circle; Psionex
- Partnerships: Midnight's Fire; Silhouette
- Abilities: Skilled acrobat and aerialist; Skilled martial artist and hand-to-hand combatant; Skilled inventor and computer hacker; Expert detective

Night Thrasher is a superhero appearing in American comic books published by Marvel Comics. He first appeared in Thor #411 (December 1989), and was created by Tom DeFalco and Ron Frenz. He is a non-superpowered vigilante, the son of murdered billionaire industrialist parents with ties to the Vietnam War, who uses an advanced suit of body armor, firearms, and a skateboard to battle his foes, and uses the billionaire resources of his family foundation to fund the New Warriors' battle against crime and corruption.

== Creation ==
In a 2017 interview, DeFalco said, "During that period of time, the bulk of Marvel's readership was sixteen-year-olds of all ages—meaning those younger who dream of that golden age and those who remembered that age with fondness, aside from New Mutants, Marvel wasn't producing any titles that featured teenagers. I wanted to introduce a new team—filled with teens—with the idea that we could eventually spin the more popular members off into their own titles. I consulted with our newsstand distributor and asked him about the magazines that teens were currently buying...He told me their most popular magazines were devoted to skateboarding with names like Thrash and Thrasher. They were even outselling the men's magazines...That's when I decided that the new team would have a character called Night Thrasher as its leader and Ron and I started talking."

== Publication history ==
In addition to New Warriors runs and multiple mini-series of his own, Night Thrasher has appeared in the series The Punisher, Civil War II, Avengers, and X-Factor.

== Fictional character biography ==
=== Early life ===
Night Thrasher vs. the Punisher. Art by Mark Bagley

As a child in New York City, Dwayne Taylor witnessed the murder of his parents. Seeking vengeance, he honed himself into a fighting machine, then became obsessed with the desire to punish all wrongdoers. However, Dwayne was unable to fully remember the exact circumstances of his parents' deaths, and he was unable to remember the face of their killer; he assumed that this was due to his mind trying to block the memory. Later in life he discovered that the entire circumstances of his parents' death and his upbringing by Andrew Chord and Tai, had been orchestrated by Tai herself.

=== Early adventures ===
Dwayne, alongside vigilantes Silhouette and Midnight's Fire, begins an organized effort to combat street gangs in New York City. Their partnership ends when Silhouette is shot and rendered paraplegic during a sting operation. Midnight's Fire blames Dwayne, becoming a drug lord to lure Dwayne into a physical confrontation that he could not possibly win. Silhouette reunites with Dwayne, distancing herself from her brother's evil actions.

=== The New Warriors ===
Night Thrasher meticulously researches young heroes and selects three as targets for recruitment. He based his group on the Fantastic Four, with himself as the Reed Richards of the group: the leader and brains. Each additional member is slated to reflect roles of each of the Fantastic Four. The first of his recruits was Richard Rider, previously known as Nova, who had apparently lost his powers. Deducing that he could reignite Rider's powers with a high-stress incident, Night Thrasher abducts Rider and drops him off a building, which successfully restores his powers.

Night Thrasher chooses the other teammates: Firestar (filling the role of Human Torch) and Marvel Boy (filling the role of Invisible Woman). Soon after assembling, the heroes confront Terrax, who has reformed his body and is causing destruction in downtown New York. Arriving at the scene, they find Namorita and Speedball. The six battle Terrax and neutralize him, but are overshadowed by the Avengers. They agree to form a new team, the New Warriors, after a label given them by a reporter.

=== The Folding Circle ===
Dwayne pretends to join the Folding Circle in order to infiltrate them, but does not inform the New Warriors of his plans. His obsession with justice, still fueled by his parents' deaths, and his anger issues led to him leaving the team. He travels with the Folding Circle to Dragon's Breath Temple in Cambodia, and learned of Tai's responsibility for his parents' death. With the New Warriors, Darkhawk, and Folding Circle, he thwarts Tai.

Night Thrasher disbands the New Warriors and decided to travel abroad, training in various martial arts disciplines. Learning of a plot against Iron Fist by the Hand's new leader Junzo Muto, Night Thrasher helps the reformed New Warriors save Iron Fist's life. In the volume's last issue, Night Thrasher returns to the New Warriors.

=== New Warriors vol. 3 ===
Night Thrasher's last suit of armor. Art by Skottie Young.

Dwayne Taylor eventually 'retires' from being a hero, but remains semi-active while running the Taylor Foundation. He intends to use the foundation to make the world a better place, and becomes heavily involved in cancer research. He gathers a top notch staff of microbiologists, one of whom developed what appeared to be a cure for cancer. The cure turns out to have been the work of the biologist's son Zachary Smith, who had used his ability to communicate with microbes to 'tell' the cure what to do. This revelation destroys investor confidence in the Taylor Foundation. The scientist dies after trying to prove the cure works by testing it on himself.

Dwayne salvages the remains of the Taylor Foundation and adopts Zachary, who goes on to join the New Warriors as Microbe. Dwayne approaches a television production company to bankroll and promote a new team, filming their exploits as a reality TV show.

=== Civil War ===
Night Thrasher is among the four New Warriors involved in the incident that led to the Superhuman Registration Act in the 2006–2007 storyline Marvel Civil War. The events of the arc begin when the villain Nitro devastates Stamford, Connecticut, killing several hundred civilians and almost all of the New Warriors' members, with Speedball being the only survivor.

In the aftermath of Civil War, a new team called the New Warriors appear. They begin recruiting underground, undiscovered heroes who disagree with the Superhuman Registration Act. While most of these New Warriors are new to the team, the leader and recruiter calls himself Night Thrasher, though his identity is initially unknown. It is later revealed that this Night Thrasher is Donyell Taylor, Dwayne's illegitimate half-brother, previously the villain known as Bandit.

=== Post-Civil War ===
The New Warriors attempt to use a time machine in an attempt to save Dwayne, but are accidentally sent to a future timeline in which Iron Man has taken over the world. Donyell confronts Iron Man and finds that it is not Tony Stark who is wearing the armor, but Dwayne resurrected. Overjoyed that his brother is alive, Donyell helps to capture his own teammates, despite his misgivings about Dwayne's dictatorship. When Dwayne kills Tony Stark, Donyell turns against him, frees the New Warriors and eventually kills him.

=== "Contest of Champions" and return ===
During a contest between the Collector and the Grandmaster, Night Thrasher is pulled out of the timestream seconds before his death to join the Collector's team. After the Maestro usurps the Collector's role and takes over the contest, Night Thrasher helps lead an insurrection. The rebellion fails, but Maestro sends Night Thrasher back to present day Earth, reasoning that he was too dangerous to keep around. In the present, Night Thrasher awakens to find that his last memory is of dying in the Stamford explosion.

== Powers and abilities ==
Night Thrasher's Mark I armor, The New Warriors #8; art by Mark Bagley

Night Thrasher possesses excellent hand-to-hand fighting ability and is trained in various martial arts. He has been able to hold his own against the Punisher and would have beaten him had the Punisher not discharged a submachine gun at point-blank range. He is also an excellent acrobat, a talented designer of battle-suits and small armaments, and a good computer hacker. His strength was enhanced by his Mark II combat armor, but not to a superhuman degree.

According to the villain Genecide, Dwayne has unspecified "advanced DNA". In issue #10 Emma Frost states he was somehow naturally immune to telepathic probes; this was later revealed to have been caused by Tai, either due to her tampering with his memory or a deliberate effort on Tai's part to ensure that no one else could manipulate Dwayne and interfere with her plans for him.

=== Equipment ===
Night Thrasher wore a special suit of light articulated combat armor composed of Kevlar/borosilicate fiber in a ceramic matrix and 8 mm and 16 mm thick layers of micro-mail titanium nitride. He designed the battle-suit to survive physical combat with Silhouette's brother Midnight's Fire. The costume cannot be penetrated by conventional bullets or knives and is fireproof. The suit includes a wafer-thin L.E.D. casing that allows the suit to camouflage itself within its surroundings. The helmet contained integral goggles with infrared sighting, telescopic lenses, magnetic resonance scanning, and a camera attachment. It also includes a breathing apparatus, voice scrambler, two-way radio communications device, parabolic sound enhancer, and a cybernetic link to armor systems.

He carried a pair of truncheons, Escrima sticks which he called his "Battle Staves" which attached to special slots in the back of the Mark I armor, and an armored high tech fiberglass skateboard with a retractable razor-sharp blade. The board also hooked onto the back of his armor. The armor was equipped with a titanium spring-lock blade in the right forearm. The left wrist contained a thin adamantium alloy garrote wire. Micro surface-to-surface (STS) missiles were also mounted on the forearms. The Mark I armor also had a hidden compartment in which he had a Micro Uzi submachine pistol stored for emergencies. His skateboard could also be used as a shield or as a weapon and could be modified for use as a snowboard.

The wrist gauntlets on his armor could fire pepper spray, sleeping gas or explosively launch his "Battle Staves" which were holstered alongside his forearms in the Mark II armor. His gauntlets could also deploy pneumatically-fired grapnel lines for traversing rooftops, and contained retractable blades and an extendable computer tap. He also had a utility pack with various shaped explosives, plastique, napalm gel, and cordite packs, magnesium flares, smoke capsules, incendiary packs, caltrops/spur jacks, and ball bearings. The back pack also contained a glider chute. The Mark II armor also had an advanced active camouflage system.

The Night Thrasher armor Dwayne was wearing in Civil War was made from a vibranium mesh.

== Merchandise ==
Various items have been marketed featuring Night Thrasher (Dwayne Taylor). In November 2006 Wizkids marketed through their Supernova line a Night Thrasher HeroClix figurines (set of 3). Night Thrasher was featured in Marvel Universe Trading Cards – Series 1 (1990, card #85), Series 2 (1991, cards #22 and 156), Series 3 (1992, cards #59 and 174), Series 4 (1993, card #26), and Series 5 (1994, cards #79 and 168). Night Thrasher was also included in a number of T-shirts, posters, and art prints featuring New Warriors.

Night Thrasher received a figure in the Marvel Legends Kingpin wave in early 2019. It came with his skateboard, black versions of Daredevil's billy clubs, a weapons mount for his back, and Kingpin's left leg.

== In other media ==
=== Television ===
- A Night Thrasher TV series was in early stages of development for UPN in 2002, but it did not materialize.
- Night Thrasher was intended to appear in New Warriors, portrayed by Jeremy Tardy, prior to its cancellation.

=== Video games ===
Night Thrasher appears in Marvel: Contest of Champions.
