= Psionex =

Group of fictional characters

- Psionex vs the New Warriors, art by Mark Bagley

Publication information
- Publisher: Marvel Comics
- First appearance: The New Warriors #4 (October 1990)
- Created by: Fabian Nicieza; Mark Bagley

In-story information
- Member(s): Mathemanic; Pretty Persuasions; Coronary; Impulse; Asylum

Psionex are a fictional team of supervillains and occasional anti-heroes appearing in American comic books published by Marvel Comics.

== Publication history ==
Created by Fabian Nicieza and Mark Bagley, Psionex first appeared in The New Warriors #4.

== Fictional character biography ==
Psionex are a group of artificially created superhumans introduced as enemies of the New Warriors. The members are young people altered by genetic, chemical, or biosurgical means by Harmon Furmintz of the Genetech Corporation to gain superpowers. They first battle the team of similarly aged heroes known as the New Warriors early in the latter team's career, but are soundly defeated and restrained.

Psionex attempts to escape Genetech's custody, feeling that they are little more than lab specimens, but are again opposed by the Warriors; this battle would lead to the rebirth of Terrax, whose essence had been contained at Genetech. Mathemanic and Impulse volunteer to aid the Warriors against Terrax, but both receive severe injuries in the fight. Impulse's injuries require him to permanently use a wheelchair, forcing him to retire. The rest of Psionex escapes during the battle, with the group ultimately breaking up.

Henrique Gallante, a drug-addicted mutant with powers allowing him to access the Darkforce dimension, takes the name Darkling. Driven mad by his abilities, he attacks New York. Several superheroes are able to convince Gallante to stop, and Gallante disappears into the Darkforce. He later returns to Earth through Asylum's mask. He takes her name and regroups Psionex as "heroes" under his leadership, including Impulse, whose powers allowed his body to eventually heal its injuries. After an extended run of crime-fighting in which much excessive force is used to apprehend criminals, the team becomes wanted by the law after a boy dies in an encounter with Asylum. Though the death is ruled accidental (an undiagnosed heart condition determined as the cause), Asylum takes responsibility and submits to police custody, while the rest of Psionex return to Genetech for observation. Mathemanic affects the perception of time in the greater NYC area, making it seem that the boy's death and subsequent events had yet to occur. Comforted by the Warriors, Mathemanic accepts that he cannot undo what has already happened and consciously dispels his effect.

During the Superhero Civil War, the individual members of Psionex (except Asylum) are apprehended by agents of the United States government who are enforcing the Superhuman Registration Act. They choose to join the Thunderbolts to avoid being jailed and are forced into a global conflict against the Grandmaster. Psionex later becomes the Initiative team for Maryland.

== Members ==
- Pretty Persuasions - Heidi P. Franklin is an exotic dancer who received the ability to amplify the erotic urges of other people, and can manifest a psionic energy whip. She has a history of returning to her career as a dancer whenever Psionex has disbanded; thus she has above-average (though not superhuman) levels of agility and athletic ability maintained by exercise.
- Coronary - James Sharp is a medical student who became a bio-telepath, capable of inducing different bodily states on other people - vomiting, unconsciousness, etc. He can take a form that appears to be made up of jagged glass; this was once permanent, but he has since appeared in his original form.
- Mathemanic - Thomas Sorenson is a genius mathematician who received the ability to transmit mathematical figures telepathically, which can have various disabling effects. For example, he forces Firestar to perceive interstellar distances, which effectively rendered her unable to perceive smaller distances. He later turned this power inward, allowing him to make incredible calculations to perform feats that seemingly defied physics, such as manipulating gravity; he once subconsciously affected the perception of the passage of time in a great number of people, in the futile pursuit of reversing time itself.
- Impulse - Dwight Hubbard is a violent former gang member who was granted enhanced reflexes and speed. He wields poisoned barbs on his gauntlets. He assisted the New Warriors in a battle solely for the violent thrill, but injuries sustained during the battle forced him to use a wheelchair. Over time, his enhanced metabolism led to a full recovery, and he rejoined Psionex when the team reformed.
- Asylum - The first Asylum is an unnamed mental patient who was imbued with Darkforce energies, transforming her body into a psionic mist that caused hallucinations in anyone who touches it. She is vulnerable at the one solid part of her body, a golden mask.
- Darkling / Asylum - Henrique Manuel Gallante was a drug addict who became mentally disturbed by his mutant ability to access the Darkforce dimension, claiming that he heard a voice from within the Darkforce. While trying to control his energies, he inadvertently unleashed its powers into and amongst the people of New York City, including other superhumans whose powers were drawn from the Darkforce. Calling himself Darkling, he asserted enough control to face New York's resident superheroes before ultimately choosing to spend time in the Darkforce dimension alone to further develop his abilities. Later, Gallante returns to Earth using Asylum's mask, taking the identity for himself and reorganizing Psionex as its leader. After accidentally killing a young boy, he voluntarily submits to police custody, and later to a mental institute to serve a term of undetermined length.
