= Namorita =

Namorita Prentiss
- Namorita on the cover of The New Warriors #65

Publication information
- Publisher: Marvel Comics
- First appearance: Sub-Mariner #50 (June 1972)
- Created by: Bill Everett (writer / artist)

In-story information
- Alter ego: Namorita "Nita" Prentiss
- Species: Atlantean/Human mutant hybrid (clone)
- Place of origin: Atlantis
- Team affiliations: Atlantean Council of Three; Soldiers of Misfortune; Secret Defenders; Water Children; Fantastic Four; New Warriors; Defenders; SURF
- Partnerships: Namora; Namor; Fin
- Notable aliases: Sub-Mariner; Kymaera; Hard
- Abilities: Superhuman strength, speed, durability, agility, senses, and reflexes; Flight via wings on her ankles; Aquatic adaptation; Longevity

Namorita Prentiss is a superhero appearing in American comic books published by Marvel Comics. Created by writer and artist Bill Everett, the character first appeared in Sub-Mariner #50 (June 1972). Namorita belongs to the subspecies of humans called mutants, who are born with superhuman abilities, and to the species of humanoid aquatic beings named Atlanteans, who are born with supernatural powers.

== Publication history ==
Namorita debuted in Sub-Mariner #50 (June 1972), created by writer and artist Bill Everett. She appeared in the 2006 Civil War series, where she was killed in an explosion caused by Nitro. Namorita returned in the series Nova, where a past version of her was brought to the present day.

== Fictional character biography ==
=== Birth ===
Namorita's mother, Namora, is the first cousin of Namor. Namora's sterility creates tension with her husband Talan. Upon meeting Vyrra, an Atlantean scientist who had been exiled for practicing the forbidden science of cloning, Namora requests that he make a clone of her to which she could give birth. Vyrra overcomes the birth defect that prevented Namora's ankle wings from developing, allowing the clone to develop the wings herself. After the clone, Namorita, is born, Talan is killed in an atomic explosion. Consequently, Namora flees to the underwater kingdom Lemuria, where she raises Namorita.

Namora developed a rivalry with Llyra for the affections of the Lemurian prince Merro, that resulted in her presumed death by poisoning at the hands of Llyra. Namora did not reveal to her daughter that she was a clone before her death. Llyra marries Merro and later becomes empress of Lemuria after Merro dies mysteriously.

=== After Lemuria ===
Llyra allies with the Atlantean exilee Byrrah, another cousin of Namor, and deploys Namorita in a plot against Namor. In her first encounter with Namor since reaching adolescence, Namorita is captured by Byrrah, but is rescued by Namor, who she falls in love with.

Namor, not feeling equipped nor inclined to be the guardian of Namorita, introduces her to his long-time friend Betty Dean Prentiss. Namorita comes to consider Prentiss as a mother figure, adopting her surname. Prentiss is later killed by Lemuel Dorcas, Namor's enemy.

In the crossover story arc Atlantis Attacks, Namorita allies with the New Mutants, who accidentally find the Horn of Doom and give it to Namor. He entrusts Namorita to guard it in her quarters in Atlantis, but Deviant forces steal the horn. When Ghaur uses the Horn to summon a sea monster to destroy Atlantis, they defeat it together, saving most of the population.

=== The New Warriors ===
Some time later, Namorita enrolls in college at Empire State University. During a trip, she is forced to battle long-time Fantastic Four foe, Terrax. She is joined by five other young superheroes; after Namorita and Nova subdue Terrax, the six form the New Warriors. When Namor decides to start a financial empire a short time later, Namorita joins him as a member of the board of Oracle, Inc.

When team founder Night Thrasher takes a hiatus from the Warriors, Namorita becomes the leader of the team. However, the stress of leading the Warriors, the revelation of her cloned nature and ruling Atlantis in Namor's absence, proves to be too much for her. The leader of the Poison Memories steals information from Namorita's apartment, which is used to kidnap many of the Warriors' family members. After the surviving family members are rescued, Namorita's guilt over the incident forces her to leave the Warriors.

Namorita returns to Atlantis, only to be denied entry after the Atlanteans discover her clone nature. An over-saturation of oxygen, coupled with the DNA Vyrra spliced into her at the time of her creation, causes her to change into a blue-skinned form resembling the original Atlanteans. Because of this, Namorita dubs herself Kymaera. Namorita later develops boils across her body before returning to her original skin tone. Nova is unable to reassure Namorita that he still loves her, causing her to leave him. Following this transformation, Namorita continues to mutate and developed new powers. She gains the ability to secrete burning acid or a paralytic toxin and camouflage herself.

=== Civil War ===
Namorita is among the four New Warriors whose actions sparked the public backlash against masked superheroes which is at the core of Marvel's Civil War. The New Warriors are trying to film a reality show, and find four villains on the FBI Most Wanted List, who they attack. Nitro explodes, devastating Stamford, Connecticut and killing Namorita, Night Thrasher, Microbe, and 612 civilians.

=== Realm of Kings ===
In the series Nova, a time-displaced Namorita is rescued from the Fault, having been summoned alongside time-displaced versions of Mister Fantastic, Black Bolt and Darkhawk by the Sphinx. After Nova defeats the Sphinx, Namorita is brought to the present day.

== Powers and abilities ==
Namorita is a genetically altered clone of her mother, Namora. Her powers comes from being a hybrid of Atlantean homo mermanus and mutant homo superior physiologies. She possesses superhuman strength, speed, durability, agility, senses, and reflexes. Her Atlantean heritage grants her an amphibious physiological adaptation. She is able to see, heal, breathe, and survive cold temperatures underwater. Namorita can fly via wings on her ankles. She can also live longer than regular human beings and does not age at the same pace. Additionally, she has the ability to absorb electricity.

== Reception ==
Deirdre Kaye of Scary Mommy called Namorita a "role model" and a "truly heroic" female character.

== Other versions ==
=== Marvel 1602 ===
An alternate version of Namorita appears in Marvel 1602. This version is the sister of Namor.

=== What If? ===
An alternate version of Namorita appears in the What If? story "What If the X-Men Died on their First Mission?" as a member of the second X-Men team.

== In other media ==
=== Television ===
Namorita Prentiss appears in the Spider-Man episode "Wrath of the Sub-Mariner", voiced by B.J. Ward.

=== Video games ===
- Namorita Prentiss appears as a non-playable character in Marvel: Ultimate Alliance, voiced by April Stewart.
- Namorita Prentiss appears as a non-playable character in Marvel: Ultimate Alliance 2, voiced again by April Stewart.

=== Merchandise ===
- Various items have been marketed featuring Namorita. In June 2007 Wizkids marketed through their Avengers line a Namorita HeroClix figurine with card. Namorita was featured in Marvel Universe Trading Cards — Series 1 (1990, card #85), Series 2 (1991, card #156), Series 3 (1992, cards #49 and 174), Series 4 (1993, card #22), and Series 5 (1994, card #167). Namorita was also included in several T-shirts, posters, and art prints featuring the New Warriors.
- In 2023, Hasbro released an action figure of Namorita as part of the Marvel Legends action figure line.
