= Helix (Marvel Comics) =

- Helix as depicted in The New Warriors #63 (August 1995). Art by Patrick Zircher

Publication information
- Publisher: Marvel Comics
- First appearance: Spider-Man: Maximum Clonage Alpha #1 (August 1995)
- Created by: Tom DeFalco (plot); Todd DeZago (writer); Ron Lim (artist)

In-story information
- Alter ego: Rafael Carago
- Species: Human mutate
- Team affiliations: New Warriors
- Abilities: Reactive adaptation

Helix (Rafael Carago) is a superhero appearing in American comic books published by Marvel Comics. He was created by Tom DeFalco and Todd DeZago in Spider-Man: Maximum Clonage Alpha (part of the Clone Saga storyline). Helix went on to join the New Warriors in The New Warriors #62.

== Fictional character biography ==
Rafael Carago is the sole survivor of an epidemic of the Carrion virus, which Spidercide released on Springdale, Pennsylvania. Rafael is discovered by agents of the Center for Disease Control, who sedate him. However, Rafael tears himself free and escapes.

Rafael is subdued by the New Warriors and Scarlet Spider, then taken into custody by Project Pegasus. However, Spidercide captures Rafael and escapes. The Jackal experiments on Rafael, mutating him further. Scarlet Spider manages to revert Rafael to his human form using a hypermorphic serum.

After a series of adventures alongside the New Warriors, Helix leaves the group, embarking on a quest to find himself.

== Powers and abilities ==
Helix is a reactive Adaptoid, meaning he can subconsciously recode his DNA in response to threatening outside stimuli. He can increase in size and strength, cancel psychokinetic energies, and adapt to any environmental toxin.
