= Silhouette (comics) =

- Silhouette, artist Mark Bagley

Publication information
- Publisher: Marvel Comics
- First appearance: The New Warriors (vol. 1) #2 (August 1990)
- Created by: Fabian Nicieza (writer); Mark Bagley (artist)

In-story information
- Alter ego: Silhouette Chord (Silhouette is the English translation of her Cambodian name Roubpheap Sramol)
- Species: Human mutant
- Team affiliations: Secret Avengers (Civil War); Folding Circle; New Warriors; Concrete Dragons; The Concrete Carrion Gang
- Abilities: Superb hand-to-hand combatant Expert martial artist Enhanced strength, speed and agility Shadow teleportation Darkforce energy manipulation Ability to become a living shadow

Silhouette (Silhouette Chord) is a character appearing in American comic books published by Marvel Comics. She first appeared in The New Warriors #2 (August 1990), and was created by Fabian Nicieza and Mark Bagley.

Silhouette and her brother Aaron Chord (Midnight's Fire) are mutants with magical powers gained from the bloodline of their mother, a member of a temple cult in Southeast Asia who married an African-American soldier from the Vietnam War. She manipulates the Darkforce, having the power to teleport, hide in shadows, and more. Silhouette is also a paraplegic, having been paralyzed from the waist down by a bullet injury sustained tracking drug gangs early in her career.

== Fictional character biography ==
Silhouette and her brother Aaron (Midnight's Fire) are the children of Andrew Chord and his wife Miyami, and were born in New York City. Chord met Miyami in 1966 while in Cambodia serving in the Vietnam War. Miyami was a member of the cult Dragon's Breath, which was based in an ancient temple in Cambodia. The temple had been built above a wellspring of energy known as the Well of All Things, whose power they intended to pass to their children.

Silhouette and Midnight's Fire are operating as independent vigilantes in New York when they meet Dwayne Taylor and begin working with him in a coordinated effort to take down local gangs. After Silhouette is shot by the police and paralyzed from the legs down in a sting gone wrong, Midnight's Fire blames Dwayne and becomes estranged from him, ultimately becoming a drug lord. Silhouette remains on good terms with Dwayne, distancing herself from her brother.

Years later, Silhouette battles the villain Bengal and seeks aid from the New Warriors, who she eventually joins. Upon reuniting with Dwayne, she reveals her ability to manipulate shadows to him. Silhouette is given a special costume made of unstable molecules which become intangible when she does. Reed Richards, who holds the patent for unstable molecules, gives his personal blessing for her to use them because he understands the heroic work the New Warriors do.

Andrew Chord's former comrade Diego Casseas, now calling himself the Left Hand, steals the power of the Well from his child, then gathers the other children of the pact into a group called the Folding Circle. The Circle attempts to take control of the Well away from Tai. The members of the Circle, together with the New Warriors, manage to defeat Tai. The Well is sealed, Casseas and Tai are apparently killed, and the surviving members of the Circle escape in a stolen Quinjet.

During the "Civil War" storyline, Silhouette is seen as a member of Captain America's "Secret Avengers", who oppose the Superhuman Registration Act. Silhouette is part of the backup team when Iron Man wants to meet Captain America at Yankee Stadium at night when it is empty. During the meeting, all the stadium's lights turn on at once. While Ultra Girl, Spider-Man, and Luke Cage attack Iron Man, Silhouette takes Captain America away.

Silhouette is one of the 142 registered superheroes who have registered after the Civil War. She later confronts the new Night Thrasher and learns that he is Dwayne Taylor's brother Donyell, also known as Bandit.

During the Blood Hunt storyline, Silhouette is among the Darkforce users who lose control of their powers, blocking out the sun and facilitating a vampire invasion. When Silver Surfer travels through the Darkforce Dimension, he encounters Silhouette and attempts to help her and the other Darkforce users.

== Powers and abilities ==
Silhouette is able to manipulate the Darkforce for a variety of effects. She can "melt" into any shadow or area of darkness, thus entering the Darkforce Dimension, and then reemerge through another shadow or area of darkness. Silhouette originally had the power to become nearly invisible while under the cover of darkness, as well as the ability to teleport herself. After a disturbance in the Darkforce that affected everyone who used it, Silhouette gained the ability to teleport others and transform into living darkness. In the fourth volume of New Warriors, Silhouette demonstrates the ability to create Darkforce tendrils. Like her brother Midnight's Fire, Silhouette possesses enhanced speed, strength, agility, and senses.

Silhouette is a skilled hand-to-hand combatant and capable martial artist, and master of an unspecified martial art.

=== Equipment ===
After she became disabled due to injuries inflicted by gunfire, Night Thrasher designed and built a special pair of combat-capable crutches and leg braces for her. Night Thrasher designed the crutches to include both a hidden electric taser that can emit electrical charges to stun an adversary, and a slim anesthetic needle injector that delivered paralytic chemicals. The crutches are also equipped with "smoke gas" and metal firing pellets.

A later design had retractable braces in specially designed open metal gauntlets.

She wears a costume made from unstable molecules, which prevents it from falling off when she becomes intangible.
