= List of New Warriors issues =

This is a List of New Warriors Issues. New Warriors is a Marvel Comics superhero team, traditionally consisting of young adult heroes. They first appeared in issues 411 and 412 of the Marvel Comics title The Mighty Thor. From 1990 the New Warriors were featured in an eponymous series written by Fabian Nicieza with art by Mark Bagley until 1996. The series lasted for 75 issues and four annuals.

A short-lived revival was launched in 1999, lasting for ten issues, and a mini-series followed in 2005. A fourth series was launched in June 2007.

== Issues ==
- Issue #1 - "From the Ground Up" (Cameos by Captain America and She-Hulk) - July 1, 1990
- Issue #2 - Mirror Moves - Aug. 1, 1990
- Issue #3 - I Am, Therefore, I Think - Sept. 1, 1990
- Issue #4 - Genetech Potential - Oct. 1, 1990
- Issue #5 - The Man Who Stole Tomorrow - Nov. 1, 1990
- Issue #6 - The Inhuman Condition - Dec. 1, 1990
- Issue #7 - Hard Choices, Part 1: The Heart of the Hunter - Jan. 1, 1991
- Issue #8 - Hard Choices, Part 2: Devils at the Doorsteps - Feb. 1, 1991
- Issue #9 - Hard Choices, Part 3: Following the Line Along the Middle - March 1, 1991
- Issue #10 - Rumble - April 1, 1991
- Issue #11 - Forever Yesterday, Part 1: Days of Present Past - May 1, 1991
- Issue #12 - Forever Yesterday, Part 2: A Betrayal of Hope - June 1, 1991
- Issue #13 - Forever Yesterday, Part 3: A World for the Winning - July 1, 1991
- Issue #14 - The Breeze Of An Underwater Wind - Aug. 1, 1991
- Issue #15 - The Sushi People - Sept. 1, 1991
- Issue #16 - Ground War - Oct. 1, 1991
- Issue #17 - Sore Winners - Nov. 1, 1991
- Issue #18 - Everything You Always Wanted to Know About the Taylor Foundation but were Afraid to ask - Dec. 1, 1991
- Issue #19 - Sympathy For The Devil - Jan. 1, 1992
- Issue #20 - The Breaking Point - Feb. 1, 1992
- Issue #21 - The Folding Circle - March 1, 1992
- Issue #22 - Nothing But The Truth, Part 1: The Stolen Children - April 1, 1992
- Issue #23 - Nothing But The Truth, Part 2: Passed Lies - May 1, 1992
- Issue #24 - Nothing But The Truth, Part 3: The Cheating Corner - June 1, 1992
- Issue #25 - Nothing But The Truth, Part 4: Justifiable Homicide - July 1, 1992
- Issue #26 - The Next Step - Aug. 1, 1992
- Issue #27 - Dark Side - Sept. 1, 1992
- Issue #28 - Heavy Turbulence - Oct. 1, 1992
- Issue #29 - World War One: This Land Must Change - Nov. 1, 1992
- Issue #30 - World War Two ... or Land Must Burn - Dec. 1, 1992
- Issue #31 - Ruins - Jan. 1, 1993
- Issue #32 - Forces Of Darkness, Forces of Light, Act 1: Crawling to the Shadows - Feb. 1, 1993
- Issue #33 - Forces Of Darkness, Forces of Light, Act 2: The Soul Canyons - March 1, 1993
- Issue #34 - Forces Of Darkness, Forces of Light, Act 3: Breaking the Back of Love - April 1, 1993
- Issue #35 - Hawks and Doves - May 1, 1993
- Issue #36 - The scales of Justice - June 1, 1993
- Issue #37 - Family Values - July 1, 1993
- Issue #38 - Family honor, poisoned memories - Aug. 1, 1993
- Issue #39 - Family viewing - Sept. 1, 1993
- Issue #40 - The Starlost, Part one: Power Tools - Oct. 1, 1993
- Issue #41 - The Starlost, Part two: Power Plays - Nov. 1, 1993
- Issue #42 - The Starlost, Part three: Power Full - Dec. 1, 1993
- Issue #43 - And Justice For All? - Jan. 1, 1994
- Issue #44 - Underwater Fire - Feb. 1, 1994
- Issue #45 - Child's Play, Part 2: Sleeping with the Enemy - March 1, 1994
- Issue #46 - Childs Play, Part 4 - April 1, 1994
