= Timeslip (comics) =

Publication information
- Publisher: Marvel Comics
- First appearance: New Warriors #59 (May 1995)
- Created by: Evan Skolnick (writer); Patrick Zircher (artist)

In-story information
- Alter ego: Rina Patel
- Species: Human mutant
- Team affiliations: New Warriors; C.R.A.D.L.E. Secret Avengers
- Abilities: Ability to send her consciousness through time; Time manipulation

Timeslip (Rina Patel) is a superhero appearing in American comic books published by Marvel Comics. Created by Evan Skolnick and Patrick Zircher, the character first appeared in New Warriors #59 (May 1995). Rina Patel was the last addition to the New Warriors before the cancellation of their original series.

== Fictional character biography ==
Rina Patel is an Indian mutant with the ability to swap her consciousness with that of her past and future selves. Later on, she discovered that she possessed superhuman strength, durability, and speed and the ability to travel through time.

After seeing a vision of Speedball dying, Rina begins making concerted efforts to protect him. However, Speedball does not take her warnings seriously, assuming she is a stalker. Rina finds Carlton LaFroyge (Hindsight) and convinces him of her sincerity and powers by pushing him out of the way of an oncoming truck.

Trying to help Rina be taken seriously by the New Warriors, Hindsight designs a superhero costume for her, dubs her Timeslip, and arranges for her to meet with the team while showing off her powers. Speedball is still dubious about her predictions, while the rest of the team does not know what to make of her. However, Timeslip's persistence convinces the Warriors to keep her around as they try to avert Speedball's death.

The Sphinx appears and kills Speedball, just as she had foreseen. It is later revealed that Speedball had been a clone from the year 2092 designed to take his place and stop the time-traveling villain Advent from rewriting the future to his liking. The Sphinx intentionally killed Speedball because he would have failed to stop Advent. Speedball's death leads Timeslip to join the New Warriors and stop Advent herself, saving the future.

Timeslip remains with the team and is instrumental in preventing the Dire Wraith queen Volx from detonating a device that would have eliminated the powers of thousands of superhumans. However, in helping to contain the blast, Rina seemingly loses her own powers.

=== Civil War and after ===
During the "Civil War" event, Hindsight publicly reveals the secret identities and addresses of the New Warriors online, having turned against them following the devastation of Stamford, Connecticut. Rina is pursued by an angry mob and is revealed to have regained her powers sometime prior.

Rina is one of the 142 registered superheroes who have joined the Initiative.

During the "Outlawed" storyline, Rina appears as a member of C.R.A.D.L.E. when a law is passed that forbids superheroes who are below the age of 21.

== Powers and abilities ==
Rina Patel possesses the ability to send her consciousness in past or future versions of herself. She is able to manipulate time, which can allow her to move at superhuman speed.

== Reception ==
=== Critical response ===
CBR.com ranked Rina Patel 6th in their "15 Amazing Asian Superheroes" list, 7th in their "10 Most Powerful Superheroes Who Can Travel Through Time" list, and 10th in their "10 Most Powerful Members of The New Warriors" list.
