= New Warriors =

Fictional team from Marvel Comics

- Cover art for New Warriors (vol 5) #1 by Marcus To

Publication information
- Publisher: Marvel Comics
- First appearance: (cameo) The Mighty Thor #411 (December 1989)
- Created by: Tom DeFalco (writer); Ron Frenz (artist)

In-story information
- Type of organization: Team
- Agent(s): Current roster: Haechi; Hummingbird; Justice; Nova; Scarlet Spider; Speedball/Penance; Sun Girl; Silhouette; Water Snake

Roster

The New Warriors are a superhero team appearing in American comic books published by Marvel Comics. They traditionally consisted of teenage and young adult heroes, and were often seen to serve as a junior counterpart to The Avengers in much the same way that the New Mutants/X-Force did with the X-Men. They made a cameo appearance in The Mighty Thor #411 (December 1989) and made their full debut in The Mighty Thor #412. Over the years, the New Warriors, in their various incarnations, have been featured in five different volumes of the title The New Warriors.

The New Warriors team was created by editor Tom DeFalco, who brought together existing Marvel characters Firestar, Marvel Boy, Namorita, Nova, and Speedball, and added the newly created Night Thrasher. Through the 75-issue comic series, the team fought adversaries, including the second Sphinx, the Folding Circle, and even the Fantastic Four. Over time, the team was joined by Silhouette, Rage, Hindsight Lad, Bandit, Timeslip, Dagger, Darkhawk, Powerpax, Turbo, and the Scarlet Spider.

The second volume of New Warriors was published in 1999–2000 and this team consisted of Namorita, Nova, Speedball, and Turbo, joined by new members Bolt and Aegis.

The third volume of the New Warriors was a six-issue mini-series that sees the superhero team cast as the stars of their own reality TV show. Night Thrasher, Nova, and Speedball were joined by Microbe and Debrii. The New Warriors are at the center of a televised fight against a number of super villains in Stamford, Connecticut, where Nitro explodes and kills 612 people, including several members of the New Warriors. The incident was one of the sparks that led to Marvel's Civil War crossover in 2006 and 2007.

The fourth New Warriors series saw Night Thrasher gather a group of former mutants and replace their lost superpowers with technology. The comic book was published from 2007 to 2009. The story reveals that Night Thrasher is the original Night Thrasher's brother, formerly known as Bandit, who wants to travel back in time and change the events at Stamford that killed his brother. When they try to travel back in time, the team ends up in a dystopic future where the original Night Thrasher is a ruthless dictator. The New Warriors return to their own time and disband.

The fifth New Warriors series was launched as part of the All-New Marvel NOW! initiative in 2014. The story saw original New Warriors members Justice (formerly Marvel Boy), Speedball, and Silhouette return to team up with the new Nova, Scarlet Spider, Hummingbird, Sun Girl, Haechi, and Water Snake.

== The New Warriors (vol. 1) ==
=== Fictional team history ===
Dwayne Taylor, the vigilante known as Night Thrasher, meticulously researches a group of young heroes to help him wage a war on crime. They are Vance Astrovik (Marvel Boy), Angelica Jones (Firestar) and Richard Rider, who at that time believed he had been depowered after quitting the Nova Corps. During their first battle with Terrax, a former herald of Galactus, they are joined by Robbie Baldwin (Speedball) and Namorita. They defeat Terrax, but the Avengers unintentionally end up taking the credit. The team decides to stay together and Speedball dubs them the New Warriors after a news report he had seen on the battle.

The newly created team gets involved in a fight between Thor and Juggernaut, helping Thor to send the Juggernaut to another dimension. In the team's second issue Night Thrasher's past comes back to haunt him as the brother and sister team of Midnight's Fire and Silhouette is introduced. Next, the corporation Genetech hires the Mad Thinker to gather information on the New Warriors to create their own superhumans, resulting in their battle with Genetech's team of superhumans, Psionex. The Warriors travel to stop a superhuman named Star Thief who is destroying space launches, with Firestar, Marvel Boy and Namorita ending up on the Moon with the Inhumans. The Team minus Night Thrasher travels to Brazil to rescue Speedball's mother from an environmental terrorist group and battle the Force of Nature. Night Thrasher stays behind to patch things up with Silhouette and confronts the Punisher. Upon the Warriors' return to New York, their headquarters (the Ambrose building) is trashed in a battle with the Hellions for the claim of Firestar.

==== "Forever Yesterday" ====
Their next adventure involves the transforming of the world into an alternate one at the whim of Meryet Karim, the second Sphinx, as seen in the Forever Yesterday storyline. This alternate world involved Egypt becoming a super-power and the formation of the United States of Assyria where that reality's Avengers served as Meryet's government task force. This is undone by the New Warriors Nova, Marvel Man (Marvel Boy's alternate counterpart), Firestar, and Dwayne Taylor (who is not Night Thrasher in this reality).

==== Folding Circle ====
The New Warriors, together with a few Psionex members, the Fantastic Four, and the Silver Surfer, fight a revitalized Terrax sometime after. Around this time, Silhouette joins, and the New Warriors meet Avenger Rage and solo hero Darkhawk. The Left Hand has also begun collecting random superpowered individuals for a team he names the Folding Circle, one member being Midnight's Fire.

The Warriors also fought the Fantastic Four when Marvel Boy, who was under the Puppet Master's control, kidnapped the Puppet Master's daughter Alicia Masters. The Puppet Master knew something was wrong with her. It was later revealed that a Skrull, Lyja had been impersonating Alicia.

Night Thrasher discovers his company, the Taylor Foundation, is involved in illegal dealings and sets out to find the truth. In the process, he discovers that his legal guardian, Andrew Chord, has been betraying him for an unidentified period of time. The team confronts the mutant immortal Gideon concerning his involvement and he handily defeats and tortures them before giving them the information they seek. Shortly thereafter, the team comes to a moral crossroads in a mission involving cocaine traffickers, and Thrasher leaves the team. Night Thrasher then comes into contact with the Folding Circle.

Returning home after the confrontation with Gideon, Marvel Boy accidentally kills his father when his father attacks him (as he has done in the past). Marvel Boy is arrested and found guilty of negligent homicide, while Firestar reveals her love for him.

With previously unrevealed abilities, Tai (Thrasher's surrogate mother) confronts and seemingly kills Silhouette. Silhouette survives and assembles the remaining New Warriors. They learn from Chord of a mystical plot to take control of the world in Cambodia, and they recruit Rage and Darkhawk to help them. The Folding Circle also travels to Cambodia. The New Warriors (with later help of the Folding Circle) fight Tai, who reveals her plans for world domination. Tai is defeated and sacrificed in a mystical well along with the Left Hand. In the end, Thrasher rejoins the Warriors.

After the adventure, Rage is kicked out of the Avengers and Speedball invites him to join the New Warriors. Meanwhile, just having been convicted of his father's murder, Marvel Boy is being escorted to the Vault via a Guardsman-guarded prison van. Namorita, Nova, and Firestar try to free him from the van, but he refuses, determined to serve his sentence. Firestar and Marvel Boy share one last moment and declare their love for one another.

==== Namorita as leader ====
Night Thrasher leaves the team to put the Taylor Foundation in order, and Namorita assumes leadership. The team meet Turbo (Michiko "Mickey" Musashi), and get involved in the civil war in the country Trans-Sabal. Although they eventually retreat, the actions of the Warriors (most notably Namorita) have not helped the country. Meanwhile, Silhouette has gone missing and Speedball's parents split up. Speedball moves to New York with his mother to be closer to the New Warriors.

The team faces the new villain Darkling and meet Cloak and Dagger and a second Turbo (Michael Jeffries). Marvel Boy adapts to prison life and becomes good friends with the guards, most notably the man who would become Hybrid. Marvel Boy helps find a compromise between the inmates and the Vault staff, quelling an inmate uprising. Meanwhile, Carlton LaFroyge (Hindsight Lad), Speedball's new neighbor, blackmails him into giving him Warriors membership after Carlton discovers Speedball's secret identity.

Some time afterward, Namorita has a one-night stand with Kimeiko Ashu, a former adversary of Night Thrasher (unknown to her at that time). Ashu steals Namorita's address book, discovers the secret identities of the Warriors and kidnaps their families. Rage's grandmother, the last member of his family, accidentally dies. In retaliation, Rage kills Ashu. Night Thrasher justifies Rage's actions in court and the judge rules in Rage's favor and he is released into Chord's custody. Namorita leaves the team, feeling guilty.

Nova is attacked by Garthan Saal, a Nova Corps centurion, and after a conflict between the Warriors, Saal, Firelord, Air-Walker, and a power-mad Nova, Xandar is restored. Nova is promoted to the rank of Centurion Prime and allowed to return to Earth to continue his activities as a superhero.

Meanwhile, Namorita faces trouble in Atlantis, and is captured. Her body is undergoing a cellular change, as a result of her being a clone, into a blue-skinned Atlantean. After a conversation with Namor, she renames herself Kymaera and decides to rejoin the New Warriors. Later, Marvel Boy is released on parole, but after anti-mutant attacks on his mother, decides not to rejoin the New Warriors, instead joining Shinobi Shaw and the Upstarts (as planned by him and Thrasher) and renaming himself Justice.

==== "Child's Play" ====
Soon after, the "Child's Play" arc begins, with the Upstarts going on what is called the Younghunt, a mission to capture all of the surviving New Mutants (who are by then called X-Force) and Hellions. This competition brings the Upstarts into conflict with the Warriors (Firestar is a former Hellion) and X-Force. The Upstarts capture most of their targets, but Paige Guthrie convinces the Gamesmaster to play another game: instead of killing mutants, the Upstarts should try to find and train young mutants like her. The Gamesmaster is intrigued and cancels the competition.

==== "Time And Time Again" ====
Shortly thereafter, the original Sphinx returns, stealing a portion of the power held by Meryet Karim. New Warriors had earlier encountered her in New Warriors #10–13. Anath-Na Mut plans his revenge against the Warriors, transporting away its eight active members (Firestar, Justice, Kymaera, Night Thrasher, Nova, Rage, Silhouette and Speedball) to different places in the time-stream. In response, Hindsight Lad and Bandit gather a new team of Warriors (Dagger, Darkhawk, Powerpax and Turbo) to go and rescue the others with the aid of Meryet. They succeed and the two teams of Warriors combat the Sphinx together, who surrenders after learning of his own true nature and finally accepts Meryet's ages-old offer of love. They merge into one composite being and depart into the time-stream to begin their life together anew. In New Warriors #51 the team is restructured as the Mad Thinker again advises the team, especially on the difficulties of growing up as individuals as a team. The main team is made up of the six original founders (Firestar, Justice, Kymaera, Night Thrasher, Nova, and Speedball). Rage, Hindsight Lad, Dagger and Alex Power become reserve members. Bandit and Silhouette leave the team.

Later, they face the Psionex team again and travel to the country of Zaire, where the team is captured by the Soldiers of Misfortune. At the end of the battle, Kymeara is brainwashed and teleports away along with the villains. Night Thrasher and Rage leave the team after a falling out over their absence on the team's previous mission, and the team also fights an enraged Namor, who eventually decides to help the team in their search for Kymeara.

The Warriors help out with a UN peace conference, assisted by Sabra. Nova loses his powers and Turbo and Alex Power become full members while Hindsight Lad becomes simply Hindsight. Night Thrasher and Rage decide to train Psionex. Next, the team involves themselves into "Maximum Clonage", fighting and capturing Helix. The Scarlet Spider joins the team afterwards.

The team faces Psionex again, now led by former Warrior Night Thrasher, and also deal with a young girl, Rina Patel, who has seen a vision of the future in which Speedball dies. Speedball has had trouble controlling his powers. They are almost able to retrieve Kymaera from the Soldiers of Misfortune, but fail. The team next deal with an impostor Scarlet Spider after the real Scarlet Spider replaces Spider-Man.

==== "Future Shock" ====
Eventually, the team comes into contact with the Guardians of the Galaxy, who are searching for Speedball, calling him a time anomaly, before they disappear again. The original Sphinx returns, citing the same reasons, and kills Speedball. Another player, Advent, comes into play, killing all of the Warriors but Timeslip. Advent is a time-traveler, trying to alter time so that the future will be molded to his own wish. His son, Darrion Grobe seeks to stop him, and creates a duplicate of Speedball's body from when he was trapped in the kinetic dimension during "Time And Time Again", so that he can travel to the first alteration point, leaving the actual Speedball in the kinetic dimension, meaning that Darrion Grobe replaced Speedball from New Warriors (vol. 1) #50 and onwards. Instead of dying, the New Warriors are transported to the year 2092, where they have seven minutes to save themselves before reality is unmade and stop Advent. Meanwhile, the Sphinx takes care of Advent in 1996, thereby stopping Advent in 2092 as well. The New Warriors are led into the kinetic dimension by a hologram of Darrion Grobe, and with the help of Timeslip and the real Speedball, are able to return to their proper time.

==== Volume's end ====
Cover to New Warriors #75, the double-sized finale to the series' run. Pencils by Patrick Zircher.

Later, a rogue faction of Hydra reveals that it has been living in the team's basement even before the team moved in, but they are stopped by the combined actions of the Warriors and the Avengers. Helix and Turbo (Michiko) both decide to leave, but Turbo is confronted by a man called Dan Jones, who has come to reclaim the Torpedo suit the Turbos wear. Dan Jones is in fact the last Dire Wraith Volx, an enemy the Warriors fought against before and who killed the other Turbo (Mike). Volx claims the suit and kidnaps Smartship Friday, the Power Pack's sentient spaceship.

With the help of the Thinker, Night Thrasher and Rage rescue Namorita from the Soldiers of Misfortune, while the Warriors join forces with Garthan Saal to stop Volx, almost leading to the death of Friday. During the adventure, Firestar asks Justice to marry her, to which he happily agrees. Night Thrasher, Rage, and Namorita join their former teammates, thanks to the Thinker. Garthan Saal sacrifices himself against Volx, transferring his powers to Nova. Eventually, the reunited New Warriors defeat Volx, at the cost of Timeslip's powers. Timeslip sabotages the power neutralizer Volx meant to use to rid every superhuman on Earth of their powers. Turbo decides to use the suit to continue on in Mike's honor, and offers Hindsight the chance to share it with her as Mike did. Alex Power decides to leave the team, believing that Power Pack could have defeated Volx without nearly destroying Friday. Night Thrasher, Namorita, and Rage rejoin the Warriors as old grudges are mended and the team comes full circle. During a mission involving a Badoon invasion sometime later, Ultra Girl and Slapstick help out the Warriors and are made members.

== The New Warriors (vol. 2) ==
New Warriors (vol. 2) #1 (October, 1999)

=== Fictional team history ===
Speedball tries to assemble a new team after they disbanded (between the first and second volume), but initially fails. Namorita and Nova arrive to cheer him up when they are called in to fight Blastaar, and they are quickly aided by Bolt, Firestar, Justice, Turbo, and new hero Aegis. Although Justice and Firestar decline to rejoin the team, the other heroes agree to reform the New Warriors. Shortly thereafter, they fight the Eugenix group, who try to kill Namorita for being a clone.

They next involve themselves in a gang war, at the behest of Aegis. This leads to their headquarters being destroyed and the team being ambushed by Heavy Mettle. This group of villains had been hired by Joseph Manfredi, otherwise known as Joe Silvermane, the former Blackwing. They move into a new headquarters, a firehouse supplied by a firefighter named Dalton Beck (who is actually the villain Firestrike) as a ploy by Silvermane so that he can attain Turbo's suit. They also team up with Generation X to stop the new villain Biohazard. After an adventure in the subway, Turbo decides to trust Dalton with her secret identity, and Firestrike hesitates, but eventually decides to not kill Turbo. She uncovers his identity as Firestrike accidentally, but he surrenders and assists the Warriors in apprehending Silvermane. However, the two lovers are forced to split up as Beck enters the Federal Witness Protection Program.

In Seattle, Night Thrasher and Iron Fist fight The Hand, which is able to kidnap Iron Fist. Night Thrasher calls in the Warriors to help him. They are able to find Iron Fist and their opponent Junzo Muto, but the ritual of stealing Iron Fist's powers has already been completed. Junzo initially defeats them thanks to their lack of teamwork, but finds his match in Night Thrasher. Fatigue strikes however, and the Warriors are forced to retreat. They next face the rogue sentient Iron Man armor and are promptly defeated, before it sacrifices its existence to save Tony Stark from dying.

In the last issue of the series (New Warriors vol. 2, #10) the team (minus Nova and Speedball) travels to Olympus, brought there by Hercules, and meets Zeus. Aegis is accused of stealing his magical breastplate by Hercules, but it was in fact a gift from Athena. During the following battle with Hercules, Aegis proves his worth and he is accepted by both Hercules and Zeus. Bolt also decides to reveal that he is sick with the Legacy Virus to the team. In the last pages, Night Thrasher, seeing the good the Warriors having been doing lately, decides to return to the team. He is happily accepted.

== The New Warriors (vol. 3) ==
New Warriors (vol. 3) #1 (June, 2005)

=== Fictional team history ===
==== Civil War ====
The New Warriors, including Microbe, Namorita, Night Thrasher and Speedball (Nova had gone into space to play a part in Marvel's Annihilation storyline), take part in a televised fight with a group of supervillains in Stamford, Connecticut. During the fight, Nitro explodes, killing 612 civilians and most of the New Warriors. Speedball survives, but loses his powers. In the subsequent storyline Civil War, five former New Warriors (Dagger, Debrii, Justice, Silhouette, and Ultra Girl) join Captain America's Secret Avengers, an underground coalition of anti-registration superheroes.

Speedball is imprisoned, facing criminal charges for the Stamford disaster. However, he regains his powers, which are now activated whenever he experiences pain. Feeling guilty for his role in the deaths of so many people, Speedball takes on the new identity of Penance and joins the government-funded Thunderbolts. Firestar decides to retire from the superhero business altogether, although she later appears as a member of Young Allies.

Following the events of Civil War, former New Warrior Aegis appears in X-Factor #9, escaping from S.H.I.E.L.D.'s Superhuman Restraint Unit with the help of Jamie Madrox. He later dies after jumping out a window, expecting his armor to protect him. Justice, Silhouette, Debrii, Rage, Timeslip, Zero-G (Alex Power), and Aegis all appear in Avengers: The Initiative as part of the 142 registered superheroes. Justice has a prominent role in this series as trainer to the recruits. Turbo is a member of the Loners and a student at the Avengers Academy. Darkhawk has his amulet ripped off at Murderworld, but later reclaims it. Bolt dies at the hands of his former mentor Agent Zero.

== New Warriors (vol. 4) ==
New Warriors (vol. 4) #9 (April, 2008)

=== Publication history ===
In vol. 4, #2 of New Warriors, Night Thrasher tries to talk the depowered Sofia Mantega into joining the team. She refuses him and the rest of the team is seen in the shadows watching the exchange. In the next issue the team is revealed, though not all of their identities. The team is shown to be:

- Blackwing (Barnell Bohusk) – A depowered mutant formerly known as Beak. Blackwing wears a suit based on Vulture's that gives him flight, super strength, and the ability to fire energy blasts.
- Decibel (Jonothon Starsmore) – A depowered mutant formerly known as Chamber. Decibel uses Klaw's sonic device, which gives him sonic abilities including flight, the ability to create sound constructs and the ability to fire energy blasts.
- Longstrike (Christine Cord) – A depowered mutant formerly known as Tattoo. Longstrike wears a version of Stilt-Man's armor that allows her to extend her limbs and grants her super strength.
- Night Thrasher (Donyell Taylor) – Taylor is the only member of the team to be a former New Warrior. He appeared in vol. 2 as Bandit. Night Thrasher is a skilled martial artist as well as bio electric mutant.
- Phaser (Christian Cord) – A depowered mutant formerly known as Radian. Phaser wears armor based on Beetle's that allows him flight and the ability to fire energy blasts.
- Ripcord (Miranda Leevald) – A depowered mutant formerly known as Stacy X. She is also equipped with web shooters, frog springs, and a Slyde suit.
- Skybolt (Vincent Stewart) – A depowered mutant formerly known as Redneck. Skybolt wears a version of Turbo's armor that gives him flight and houses various weapons.
- Tempest (Angel Salvadore) – A depowered mutant formerly known as Angel. Tempest uses technology that gives her flight as well as fire and ice powers.
- Wondra (Jubilation Lee) – A depowered mutant formerly known as Jubilee. Wondra wears the Wizard's technology allowing her to manipulate gravity that grants her flight, super strength and a personal force field.

Grace and Kaz are also introduced in the third issue. Grace is a teenager who has a natural talent with technology. Kaz builds the weapons that Night Thrasher designs. On their first mission the team goes up against a new Zodiac. Longstrike is killed when she tries to take on this incarnation's version of Cancer. In issue #6, the team reveals each of their identities to the rest of the team. This is the first time Ripcord is clearly identified as Stacy X. Night Thrasher does not reveal his identity to the team, but it is revealed to the readers at the end of the issue.

Night Thrasher announces that he is breaking up the team. Sofia comes to their headquarters and joins the team after making an impassioned speech about why they should stay together. She assumes the identity of Renascence, utilizing six metallic tentacles that can fire energy blasts and technology that creates a force field around her. Several new characters are introduced during the series' run. They include a team of supervillains named Alphaclan. In issue #10, a third teenager named Aja is introduced as part of the support staff. He is another technological expert, specializing in computers.

Later in the series the team is apprehending another new supervillain team, the Dread Dealers, when they are attacked by the New Warriors Task Force, led in part by Detective Bev Sykes. During the battle, Ripcord and Skybolt are apparently killed (Stacy X shows up later with her powers in Vengeance #1). The team finds out that Night Thrasher has been manipulating them all while finding artifacts necessary to make a time machine. His plan is to go back in time to stop the Stamford accident and keep his brother from dying. Instead, the team ends up in a future in which the country is run by Iron Man (who in this reality is a resurrected Dwayne Taylor) and Night Thrasher is Tony Stark. Taylor kills the defenseless Stark simply because he is an "enemy of the state". Donyell ends up having to kill the brother he traveled through time to save. Once the team is back in their own time, they agree to disband.

=== Counter Force Team ===
In the pages of Avengers: The Initiative #6 (January 2008), the team's drill instructor Gauntlet is left battered with 'NW' (the New Warriors tag) sprayed on him. It is revealed that former New Warrior Slapstick attacked Gauntlet out of revenge for the man's comments about his dead friends while drilling the Initiative recruits. Unfortunately, Rage is suspected of the crime. In Avengers: The Initiative #10 (May 2008) Justice forms a team including former New Warriors Debrii, Rage, Slapstick and Ultra Girl.

In Avengers: The Initiative #12, Justice's team of New Warriors joins forces with the MVP clone and the surviving Scarlet Spiders as a Counter Force of underground registered heroes intent on monitoring the actions of the Fifty State Initiative. Ultra Girl decides to leave Counter Force to stay with the Initiative, telling Vance that she still believes in the Initiative.

Following the disbandment of the last team of Warriors, Counter Force has reclaimed the New Warriors name and they have added the new Night Thrasher to their ranks. With Norman Osborn taking control of the Initiative, the New Warriors return to Camp Hammond to reveal the truth of MVP's death, but they find themselves forced to defend the Initiative from Ragnarok. During the battle, Ragnarok kills one of the Scarlet Spiders.

The new New Warriors now call themselves the Avengers Resistance and are fugitives, being accused of releasing Ragnarok. They work alongside Gauntlet and Tigra. The Avengers Resistance later help the Initiative team called Heavy Hitters to secede from the program. Later, Night Thrasher is captured and Debrii resigns from the group.

After the events of "Siege", the Avengers Resistance becomes obsolete. Justice and Tigra become staff members of Avengers Academy, while Gauntlet returns to the Army.

== New Warriors (vol. 5) ==
=== Publication history ===
In this new team, Justice and Speedball are returning Warriors, while Nova (Sam Alexander), Scarlet Spider (Kaine), Hummingbird (Aracely Penalba), Sun Girl (Selah Burke), the Inhuman Haechi (Mark Sim), and the Atlantean Water Snake (Faira Sar Namora) are among the new members. Later issues added two New Men (Jake Waffles and Mr. Whiskers) as supporting cast and Silhouette as a member.

=== Fictional team history ===
Having taken the road again after renouncing their teacher jobs at Avengers Academy, Speedball and Justice find themselves in the town of New Salem, Colorado, where they get into a fight with the Salem's Seven, but quickly patch things up after it is clear it was nothing more than a misunderstanding; their leader, Vertigo, explains later to Justice that the place is a haven for all people "born of magic" with Salem's Seven acting as the town's resident protectors. While the conversation deviates to Justice's and Speedball's intention of reforming the New Warriors and the difficulties that that will probably bring due the team's persisting bad reputation for their involvement in the Civil War events, they notice the teleportation arrival into the town of a trio of enigmatic figures clad in advanced armor. One of these beings declares that "the blood here is tainted" and all must be burned down.

In the ensuing fight, these three strange individuals tell Justice of how they once tried to help mutantkind but were instead betrayed by the X-Men. Eventually, Speedball and the rest of the Salem's Seven are drawn into the combat, but that is still not enough to halt the mysterious assailants who declare that Robbie is also "corrupted" – "altered by an other-dimensional energy". The strangers knock out Brutacus, one of the town protectors, to later take a gene sample of him "as requested by their lord". Taking advantage of their enemies' distraction, Justice manages to land a telekinetic blow on the face of the trio's leader and crack his armor, revealing him to be a hairy humanoid. As Vance tries to parley with them, the enigmatic attackers simply continue their proclamations against the town's inhabitants and mutants, arguing there is no point trying to talk as "judgement is coming", to later teleport out of town.

Armed with the scant facts they learned of their aggressors, Justice uses his telekinetic powers to propel himself and Speedball to Avengers Tower at a vertiginous velocity. They are met by an empty place with the exception of Edwin Jarvis, the tower's resident butler, who informs them that the Avengers are busy elsewhere and conducts them to the Avengers's database. There they discover a video file made by Cyclops that reveals the identity of the town attackers: the Evolutionaries, a group of pre-homo sapiens that had been transformed in the ancient past by Phastos of the Eternals, who gave them advanced intelligence, armor and power, and assigned them the mission to protect the most advanced human subspecies from the others; at that time, homo sapiens. But left to their own devices, the Evolutionaries had decided that the most advanced subspecies in the present were the mutants and that the best way to protect them was to annihilate the rest of humanity, a situation that the X-Men stopped.

While pondering why the Evolutionaries had changed objectives once again, Justice and Speedball hear an alarm and the computer informs them of an emergency taking place on New York's subway system. With none else to attend to it, Justice asks Robbie if he can act as an Avenger for a day, to which Speedball responds that he won't: he will act as a [New] Warrior. They head out and arrive just in time to rescue Mark Sim and Sun Girl, two inexperienced heroes who had tried to stop a second group of Evolutionaries from killing the mutant Morlocks that live in New York's sewer near the subway. As the enemy flees with the arrival of Speedball and Justice, a new problem arises when police arrives to the scene and the officers start to panic at Mark because his appearance coincides with ill-reported accounts of witnesses (and due the general public distress at the new Inhumans popping up from the general population in the aftermath of Thanos's recent invasion of Earth). As a shooting starts, the four heroes escape, with Justice shielding them from the bullets.

As the four recover on the roof of a nearby building, Mark succumbs to his emotions, the incident with the police being the last's straw on a series of awful days since he gained his powers. The other three try to reassure him and calm his uncertainty at what the future holds for him. But an argument is bred between Justice and Sun Girl on differing opinions about it, which Robbie tries to broker or stop. To prove her point and to demonstrate Mark's energy absorption abilities, Sun Girl shoots the distressed young man, to the shock of Justice and Speedball. After the situation defuses, they discuss what to do with the Evolutionaries: Justice wants to leave this matter on the hands of the Avengers when they return, but Sun Girl convinces them to take care of it themselves. However, Justice wants to first find Nova, their New Warriors reservist member.

Meanwhile, in the sunny beaches of Mazatlan, Mexico, Aracely and Kaine make a stop to look for food supplies after she depleted them with her constant snacking.

Seeing that Nova doesn't answer his phone, they head back to the Salem's Seven and through their help and that of New Salem's magical inhabitants, they locate the boy. As it turns out, he along with Hummingbird, Scarlet Spider, and Faira Sar Namora of Atlantis, were kidnapped separately by the Evolutionaries and the High Evolutionary, and were held as prisoners in Mount Wundagore. Rushing, they arrive as the Evolutionaries are about to execute Nova, following his and the other prisoners' attempt to break out. Justice tries to reason with the High Evolutionary, but as this one gives a cryptic refusal and Nova reveals his plan of eliminating "mostly everyone", they opt to skip the diplomacy. A chaotic fight ensues, with the prisoners, Sun Girl, Mark and the New Warriors forming an impromptu team that manages to defeat the small army of Evolutionaries through their diverse and very different powers and abilities.

However, with his allies defeated, the High Evolutionary accelerates his plan and decides to activate the machine he was working on. Nova tries to stop him, but he is knocked unconscious by an energy blast. The others pursue the High Evolutionary and try to reanimate Nova, who manages to mumble to the team the machine's purpose – killing "people with powers". The machine begins its process, bathing the entire mountain in a pinkish light: everyone on the team is then brought down to the ground as an excruciating sensation of pain torments their bodies and minds. Everyone but Sun Girl, who is a normal non-altered human without special genes, alien ancestry or magic.

Noticing this, the High Evolutionary approaches her politely and explains that he did not intended for the situation to occur in that manner; before the outbreak and the fight, he was trying to use Nova's helmet to allow his machine to work more efficiently and quickly, saving its victims of any lengthy pain as they die. Also, that he took no pleasure on any of these events and, as he had stated before, he would have wanted to act differently but had no time to do so; he had been informed that the Celestials – a group of powerful, advanced aliens who had manipulated life across the universe since billions of years ago for their own purposes – would come to "judge" Earth very soon. Should the Celestials find the inhabitants of a planet wanting, they would annihilate them and, allegedly, this time they expected Earth to contain only one dominant species: humanity, with no offshoots or deviations of any kind. Thus the reason the High Evolutionary created the machine to kill any mutant, inhuman, hybrid or person of any kind that could displease the Celestials.

== New Warriors (canceled vol. 6) ==
In March 2020, a new team was announced with the original New Warriors serving as mentors. The series would have been written by Daniel Kibblesmith with art by Luciano Vecchio. This New Warriors team included Screentime, a "Meme-Obsessed" teenager whose brain became connected to the internet after being exposed to his grandfather's "experimental internet gas"; Snowflake, a non-binary teenager with ice powers; Safespace, Snowflake's twin brother who can create forcefields; B-Negative, a living vampire who received a blood transfusion from Morbius; and Trailblazer, who has a pocket dimension inside of her backpack. Snowflake, who is also black, would have been Marvel Comics' first non-binary superhero. The first issue was originally solicited for publication on April 15, 2020.

Kibblesmith said that he "wanted to have teen characters who felt as "now" as the New Warriors did in 1990" and explained Snowflake's and Safespace's names that "it's this idea that these are terms that get thrown around on the internet that they don't see as derogatory. [They] take those words and kind of wear them as badges of honor." Regardless, the new team was criticized for being perceived as mocking progressive values by naming superheroes after the slang terms "snowflake" and "safe space" and the character of Screentime was also mocked as unintentionally ridiculous. The series was canceled by Marvel without comment. The cancelation has been attributed to fan backlash and the COVID-19 pandemic. Despite the series' cancellation, B-Negative appeared in the one-shot Darkhold: Blade, which Kibblesmith and Vecchio worked on.

== Membership ==
The founding members of the New Warriors were Speedball, Night Thrasher, Namorita, Kid Nova (better known as Nova), Firestar, and Marvel Boy (currently Justice).

== Enemies ==
- Cardinal - A mercenary whose armored suit grants him flight and super-strength.
- Folding Circle - A group of mutates who can tap into the Universal Wellspring.
  - Left Hand - The leader of the Folding Circle who encompasses dark energy in his left hand.
  - Bloodstrike - A member of the Folding Circle with super-strength.
  - Midnight's Fire - A martial artist member of the Folding Circle with enhanced senses, strength, speed, and agility.
  - Silk Fever - A pyrokinetic member of the Folding Circle. Formerly known as Firewall and a former member of Force Nature.
  - Smiling Tiger - A member of the Folding Circle with razor-sharp claws.
- Force of Nature - An eco-terrorist group.
  - Aqueduct - A water-manipulating villain.
  - Firebrand - A villain who uses fire-based technology.
  - Firewall - A pyrokinetic villain. Later joined the Folding Circle as Silk Fever.
  - Skybreaker - An aerokinetic Inhuman.
  - Terraformer - A creation of Plantman.
- Heavy Mettle - A supervillain team established by Joseph Manfredi.
  - Firestrike - The leader of Heavy Mettle whose suit enables him to perform fire attacks.
  - Barracuda - A supervillain whose armor grants her super-strength enables her to survive underwater.
  - Blackwing - A female supervillain whose armor enables her to fly.
  - Riot - A supervillain whose armor enables him to produce super-strong sound-waves enough to knock a human down.
  - Stronghold - A supervillain whose armor grants him super-strength.
  - Warbow - An archery supervillain who uses special arrows for his bow.
- Nitro - A supervillain who can explode and reform his body at will.
- Psionex - A group of artificially-created supervillains created by Harmon Furmintz of Genetech.
  - Asylum - An unnamed mental patient who was imbued with Darkforce energies, transforming her body into a psionic mist which caused hallucinations in anyone who touched it.
  - Coronary - A medical student who became a bio-telepath, capable of inducing different bodily states on other people - vomiting, unconsciousness, etc. For some reason, his genetic alterations also gave his body a crystalline composition.
  - Impulse - A violent former gang member who was granted enhanced reflexes and speed. He wielded poisoned barbs on his gauntlets.
  - Mathemanic - A genius mathematician who received the ability to transmit mathematic figures telepathically, which can have various disabling effects.
  - Pretty Persuasions - An exotic dancer who received the ability to amplify the erotic urges of other people, and can manifest a psionic energy whip.
- Ragnarok - A cyborg clone of Thor.
- Sea Urchin - An armored mercenary and salvager.
- Skrull - A race of shapeshifting aliens.
- Sphinx - An ancient Egyptian magician.
- Star Thief - A supervillain who can fly and has energy projection abilities.

== Other versions ==
=== New Warriors (MC2) ===
An alternate universe iteration of the New Warriors appears in the MC2 imprint, consisting of Buzz, Darkdevil, Golden Goblin, Raptor, and Ladyhawk.

=== Wolfpack (House of M) ===
Within the House of M reality created by the Scarlet Witch, Luke Cage, leader of the Human Resistant Movement, makes treaties among the rival gangs. Among them is one called the Wolfpack, and the majority of its members have been New Warriors in the 616 reality. The gang's roster includes Darkhawk, Lightspeed, Rage, Speedball, Turbo and Zero-G.

== In other media ==
=== Television ===
- The New Warriors make cameo appearances in Fantastic Four, consisting of Darkhawk, Justice, and Speedball.
- A New Warriors-esque group appear in the Ultimate Spider-Man's first two seasons, led by Spider-Man and consisting of Power Man, Nova, Iron Fist, and White Tiger, who are all members of S.H.I.E.L.D.'s training program for teenage superheroes. In the third season, Web Warriors, Agent Venom, the Iron Spider, Ka-Zar, Zabu, Cloak and Dagger, Squirrel Girl, and Triton form the New Warriors proper. The Rhino is also a member until he is brainwashed and forced to serve Doctor Octopus until the series finale. In the fourth season, Ultimate Spider-Man vs. the Sinister 6, the Scarlet Spider, Kid Arachnid, the Sandman joined the team. At series' end, Harry Osborn / Patrioteer, Frances Beck / Mysterio, the Vulture, Mary Jane Watson / Spider-Woman, and Steel Spider as the new roster after the original graduated.
- A live-action half-hour New Warriors sitcom, starring a version of the eponymous team with elements of the Great Lakes Avengers, was in development by Marvel Television and ABC Studios as part of the Marvel Cinematic Universe. The team was going to consist of Squirrel Girl, Mister Immortal, Night Thrasher, Speedball, Microbe, and Debrii. Reportedly, Squirrel Girl's sidekick Tippy Toe was also going to appear in the series. In July 2017, the New Warriors cast was officially announced to be Milana Vayntrub as Squirrel Girl, Derek Theler as Mister Immortal, Jeremy Tardy as Night Thrasher, Calum Worthy as Speedball, Matthew Moy as Microbe, Kate Comer as Debrii, and Keith David as Ernest Vigman; a character who would have become the series' version of MODOK. The show originally received a direct-to-series order with 10 episodes to debut on Freeform in 2018, co-produced by ABC Signature. However, on November 1, 2017, it was announced that the series would no longer air on Freeform and was being shopped to other networks, with some sources saying the series could find a home on Disney's then-upcoming subscription streaming service, Disney+. In September 2019, following the restructuring of both Marvel Television and its parent company Disney, the series was officially considered dead.

=== Music ===
The debut single from recording artist and songwriter Olivia Ryan, "New Warriors", was partially inspired by and indirectly references several members of the titular group. The single and corresponding music video were both released in January 2021.
