= Jubilee (character) =

Marvel Comics superhero

- Textless variant cover of Rise of the Powers of X #4 (April 2024). Art by Derrick Chew.

Publication information
- Publisher: Marvel Comics
- First appearance: The Uncanny X-Men #244 (May 1989)
- Created by: Chris Claremont; Marc Silvestri

In-story information
- Alter ego: Jubilation Lee
- Species: Human mutant
- Team affiliations: X-Men; Forgiven; Generation X; X-Force; X-Corps; New Warriors; Patsy Walker Temp Agency; Excalibur; X-Terminators
- Notable aliases: Wondra
- Abilities: Pyrotechnic energy plasmoids generation and manipulation; Telepathic detection immunity

Jubilee (Jubilation Lee) is a superhero appearing in American comic books published by Marvel Comics, most commonly in association with the X-Men. Created by writer Chris Claremont and artist Marc Silvestri, the character first appeared in The Uncanny X-Men #244 (May 1989). Jubilee is a mutant with the ability to generate pyrotechnic energy blasts.

Jubilee became a prominent member of the X-Men during the 1990s and is particularly associated with Wolverine. She later became one of the principal characters of Generation X and has continued to appear in X-Men-related publications.

Outside comics, Jubilee gained wider recognition through X-Men: The Animated Series and has appeared in other television series, films, and video games.

== Publication history ==
Jubilee was created by writer Chris Claremont and artist Marc Silvestri and first appeared in The Uncanny X-Men #244 (May 1989). Claremont had earlier introduced a "Jubilee" of sorts in The New Mutants Annual #2 (1986). In that story, Darla of the Fat Boys, after being mentally and biologically warped, uses identical powers to those of the later Jubilation Lee and introduces herself as "Jubilee! Whose every move is a celebration!" In her first appearance, Jubilation Lee gives a similar self-introduction: "Actually, my name is Jubilee! 'Cause with me, every day's a celebration!" Darla is returned to normal by the end of The New Mutants Annual #2, and no in-story connection between the characters is ever established.

Jubilee appeared regularly as an X-Men team member in The Uncanny X-Men through issue #280 (Sept. 1991), and later was a staple of X-Men (1991) as a member of the X-Men's Blue Team. During the same timeframe, she also served as Wolverine's sidekick in Wolverine vol. 2 #40–75 (1991–1993).

After the Phalanx Covenant storyline in X-Men #16–17 and The Uncanny X-Men #316–317, Jubilee, who was then a teenager, was transferred to the X-Men trainee squad Generation X and starred in the entire run of Generation X #1–75 (1994–2001). After the dissolution of Generation X, Jubilee returned to the pages of The Uncanny X-Men, first as a member of the X-Corporation (#403–406, 2002), and later as a team member in her own right (#423–437, 2003–2004). Jubilee had a six-issue self-titled limited series in 2004 written by Robert Kirkman, but loses her mutant powers in House of M – The Day After #1 (Jan. 2006). She then adopts the alias Wondra and joins the reconstituted New Warriors in New Warriors vol. 4 #1–20 (2007–2009).

Jubilee is affected with vampirism during the "Curse of the Mutants" in X-Men vol. 3 #1 (July 2010) and remained a sporadic character on that title through issue #27 (April 2012), as well as a supporting character in X-23 vol. 3 (2010–2011). In 2011, she saw print in her second four issue limited series, Wolverine and Jubilee written by Kathryn Immonen and drawn by Phil Noto, as an aftermath follow-up to the Curse of the Mutants storyline. Jubilee later featured as a regular character in the all-female X-Men vol. 4 #1–25 (2013–2015), and as a supporting character in Patsy Walker, a.k.a. Hellcat! (2016). She returned as a main cast member in Generation X vol. 2 #1-9, #85-87 (2017-2018) as the adult mentor to the new teenage main characters, during which she was cured of vampirism and had her mutant powers restored.

== Fictional character biography ==
=== Origins ===
The daughter of two prosperous Chinese immigrants, Jubilation "Jubilee" Lee was born in Beverly Hills, California, where she lived with her wealthy parents. An immensely talented gymnast, she was believed to have the potential to participate in the Olympic Games. This life was destroyed when her parents were murdered by the hitmen Reno and Molokai.

Jubilee was sent to an orphanage but ran away and hid in the Hollywood Mall, stealing food to survive. She discovered her mutant power to generate blinding and explosive energy blasts (herself referring to them as "fireworks") while running away from mall security. The stress of fleeing security guards caused Jubilee to emit a large light energy blast in a back alley. This disoriented the men and allowed her to escape. Learning about her mutant ability, she realized she could earn money by using it to entertain customers in the mall.

The mall security attempted to put an end to her unauthorized performances, but she continued to elude them. They hired the M-Squad, a company of professional mutant hunters, to capture her. Jubilee was rescued by X-Men members Dazzler, Psylocke, Rogue, and Storm. Curious about the women, she tracked them to the portal leading back to their base in the Outback and stepped through.

Jubilee stays hidden in the base, never having heard of the X-Men and has no idea how they might react to her presence. She steals food and borrows clothes from several of the X-Men to create a makeshift costume for herself. She is attacked by a cybernetic dog, and forced to use her powers in self-defense by blowing up the beast. This is the first time Jubilee learns her powers can do real damage, although a later retcon has her first manifestation causing destruction on a similar scale.

While sneaking around the caverns in the Outback base, Jubilee witnesses the X-Man Wolverine being captured and tortured by the Reavers. Jubilee is terrified of the Reavers, but is unable to convince herself to abandon a fellow human being to such suffering. During a respite from the torture sessions, Jubilee helps Wolverine back to her hiding spot in the complex, where she nurses him back to health. Before entirely recovered, Wolverine and Jubilee are forced to abandon their sanctuary when the Reavers hunt them down.

=== Wolverine and the X-Men ===
Wolverine brings Jubilee to Professor Xavier at the X-Mansion, who welcomes the girl with open arms. She and Wolverine develop a close father-daughter relationship with one another. Due to this relationship, Jubilee is referred to as Wolverine's unofficial sidekick.

Jubilee finds a home with the X-Men and joins the X-Men Blue Team. She forms close bonds with many of the team members, taking piggyback rides with Beast as she enjoys his leaping abilities. When Professor Xavier temporarily regains the use of his legs, she takes him rollerblading. She has the chance to talk about Wolverine with Shadowcat, who had been in her sidekick role before, and bonds with the younger Illyana Rasputin. Jubilee later mourns the loss of Illyana with the rest of the X-Men, especially Jean Grey.

During one adventure, Jubilee falls halfway through a time portal and witnesses the moment when hitmen arrived at her home to kill her parents. Knowing the names and faces of her parents' murderers for the first time, Jubilee sets out to kill them, but Wolverine talks her out of it. Shortly after, Wolverine leaves the X-Men. He does not give Jubilee the option to come with him, instead leaving her a note which repeatedly emphasizes that she should stick with Professor Xavier and not go out on her own again. Though she maintains her usual spunky demeanor in the ensuing weeks, the other X-Men notice that she feels somewhat abandoned by Wolverine's leaving.

=== Generation X ===
Jubilee leaves the X-Men to join a new group of teenage mutants known as Generation X, tutored by Banshee and Emma Frost. Banshee and Frost educate the teenagers in school subjects as well as combat and field skills (with occasional assistance from visiting instructors such as Wolverine and Beast).

Jubilee is kidnapped and held hostage by Bastion during Operation: Zero Tolerance. She manages to resist his mental probes for a good amount of time, hiding valuable information about the X-Men. Jubilee stages an escape early on, knocking several armed soldiers unconscious with a large plasma volley. However, she is recaptured when she stops to give CPR to one of the guards she injured. She eventually escapes with the help of Bastion's assistant, Daria. While wandering the desert after her getaway, she is attacked by a Prime Sentinel and holds her own by blasting his vision receptors. She is saved at the last minute by Wolverine, who reunites her with the X-Men. After discovering Bastion has planted a nano-explosive inside Cyclops, the X-Men return home, dropping Jubilee off at Massachusetts Academy on the way.

One of the most important episodes of her stay with Generation X comes when she discovers the true killer of her parents, Hunter Brawn. She stages an operation, using her mutant powers, and innate skills and abilities to track down Brawn. With the help of her friends and teammates, she manages to defeat him. Enraged at how he destroyed her family, Jubilee's powers flare to a massive level, but instead of killing the man, she takes out her aggression by blowing up his warehouse, leaving him to be arrested.

=== After Generation X ===
After Generation X disbands, Jubilee moves to Los Angeles with her former teammate Skin to pursue an acting career. She is cast in nothing but stereotypical Asian roles, and after her agent tries to seduce her, she hits him with a powerful energy blast.

Around the same time, Jubilee is offered a position on Banshee's militaristic X-Corps team, alongside former teammates Husk and M. The three young women hesitantly join Banshee to keep an eye on him. During her run with the X-Corps, Jubilee holds off an uprising in Paris by blinding hostile enemies. Jubilee and Husk, with the help of Stacy X, also manage to take down Blob and rescue Banshee from Mystique.

After her time in the X-Corps, Jubilee returns to Los Angeles with Skin, but the two (along with Magma and other mutants) are kidnapped by the Church of Humanity and crucified on the front lawn of the X-Mansion. Jubilee, Magma, and the others recover from the attack thanks to Angel's healing blood, but Skin is unable to be healed and dies. Jubilee becomes depressed due to the loss of her friend, and reunites with Husk. The two, along with Angel, attend Skin's funeral. Since the gravekeeper would not allow a mutant to be buried in his cemetery, he has Skin cremated and gives Jubilee his ashes. Afterward, Jubilee goes on a few missions with Nightcrawler and Havok's Uncanny X-Men team, but is taken off the active roster when Cyclops decides she needs a mental break.

While inactive, Jubilee is contacted by a long lost relative, her aunt Hope. Hope decides to adopt Jubilee and take her into her home in Los Angeles, which gives Jubilee a much-needed break from X-Mansion life. Jubilee attends Payton Noble High School and becomes a peer advisor. She gets into a few fights at school, and is reprimanded because of her power display. She also befriends a mutant named Shane Shooter, and helps him take down a gang leader. Unfortunately for Jubilee, her aunt is caught in a crime ring, as she was an assassin. While Wolverine is visiting Jubilee, the two of them – along with Hope (and her butler Brad) – get into a battle with Hope's former boss. Hope is caught in a violent explosion and seemingly dies (she is later revealed to have been thrown afar by the explosion, revealing her cybernetic nature), causing a distraught Jubilee to move back to the X-Mansion with Wolverine.

Jubilee as Wondra. Art by Humberto Ramos.

=== Decimation and aftermath ===
Jubilee is revealed to have lost her powers on M-Day, due to the reality-altering powers of the Scarlet Witch. She returns to New York shortly after running a half-way house for depowered mutants in Queens, New York, and is kidnapped by Omega Red and his henchmen while Wolverine is sidetracked during the battle. She is taken to Berlin as a hostage. Wolverine manages to use S.H.I.E.L.D. to find Jubilee, but she is beaten and badly injured. Logan trades his freedom from S.H.I.E.L.D. for Jubilee's safety and well-being. She is carried away in a medical unit by S.H.I.E.L.D. operatives.

Jubilee next resurfaces as Wondra, the second-in-command of one of the incarnations of the New Warriors. Recruited as the first member, Jubilee takes a more serious attitude to her role as Wondra and serves alongside fellow X-Men and former teammates Decibel and Stacy X. Jubilee distrusts Night Thrasher and uncovers evidence that he is using the team for less than noble reasons, and after a trip to the future, the former mutants leave the team in the hands of ex-members of the Initiative.

After leaving the New Warriors, she returns to San Francisco and meets with a group of young mutants her age, who tell her about Utopia, the island home for mutants. Jubilee reaffirms her identity as a mutant, despite being depowered, but still declines to join the X-Men on Utopia.

=== Curse of the Mutants ===
Cyclops sends Pixie to check on Jubilee, and while the girls are chatting, Jubilee is one of many individuals to be mass-infected with a bio-engineered virus by a vampire suicide bomber. Jubilee is taken to the X-Men's headquarters, where they run tests on her, confirming that the virus is slowly but surely transforming her into a vampire, making her less and less able to handle sunlight. Meanwhile, others infected by the virus quickly turn into full vampires and begin enacting the plans of the mysterious "Lord of Vampires".

Wolverine feeds her some of his blood, since his healing factor keeps her from becoming savage.

Jubilee is successfully transformed into a vampire and temporarily does the same to Wolverine after he comes to rescue her. Jubilee soon starts to develop a friendship with X-23 due to their similar circumstances, with the latter helping her deal with her urges to kill, while Jubilee in turn helps Laura learn how to be a "normal" girl. She is later taken in by a group of vampires called the Forgiven, who have learned to move beyond their need for blood and can move about in the day, as a student.

=== Marvel NOW! ===
Jubilee returns to the X-Men with an orphaned baby, whom she names Shogo, who was infected with Arkea. During the Battle of the Atom event, Sentinel X (a member of the future X-Men) is revealed to be a fully grown Shogo. The two spend some quality time together after the death of the future Jubilee and the defeat of the Brotherhood of Mutants. Afterward, Storm informs Jubilee that the adoption papers have gone through, legally making her Shogo's mother.

=== Reverting to a mutant ===
Jubilee becomes a teacher at the newly-renamed Xavier Institute, mentoring students deemed unsuited to become either X-Men or mutant ambassadors to humanity. Students under her supervision include Quentin Quire, Bling!, Nature Girl, Eye-Boy, Morph (Benjamin Deeds), and Nathaniel Carver. During Jubilee's time at the Institute, Quire cures her of her vampirism using a shard of the Phoenix Force.

=== Krakoan Era ===
Shortly after Professor X established the Krakoan Era, Jubilee joins with Betsy Braddock, Captain Britain, Rogue, Gambit, and Apocalypse to form a new iteration of Excalibur. Jubilee helps the team with the investigation of Otherworld, which had become connected to Krakoa through a magical gate.

== Powers and abilities ==
=== Mutant powers ===
Jubilee is a mutant with the ability to generate pyrotechnic energy plasmoids from her hands, referred to as "fireworks". The plasmoids obey her mental control, travel where she directs them, arrange themselves in various shapes, and explode on her command. The strength of the blasts vary in degrees of power and intensity, and range from a multitude of colorful sparkles capable of temporarily blinding a person to a powerful detonation capable of smashing objects and destroying property. She can also detonate a precision burst inside a human brain to simulate the effects of a massive stroke. Jubilee can also absorb this energy back into her own body without harm.

While training in Generation X, Emma Frost described Jubilee as having the untapped ability to detonate matter at a subatomic level, which in theory is the equivalent of a nuclear fusion bomb. Her moral stance on taking a life was observed by Emma during the Phalanx Covenant, when Jubilee explained her fear of killing someone should her powers ever flare up again. Emma stated that Jubilee had unlimited potential and was one of the most powerful mutants she had ever encountered, being able to detonate matter at a sub-atomic level. Jubilee's Age of Apocalypse alternate had few qualms about using her powers, and made liberal use of her full ability. In X-Terminators, Jubilee makes good on all of Emma's speculations as she releases an Atom Bomb attack that completely destroys the Collector's spaceship (while also vaporizing her own clothes and all of the hair on her body).

Jubilee also displayed an immunity to telepathy, allowing her to remain "invisible" to telepaths. She has, on occasion, used this ability to hide herself from telepathic scans and to block mental probes from Sentinels.

=== As Wondra ===
Jubilee was among the mutants depowered by M-Day. She fell into a deep depression following the loss of her powers, going through several jobs before joining the New Warriors. During this time, she was known by the alias "Wondra".

Upon joining the post-Civil War New Warriors team, Wondra gained highly advanced technology from Night Thrasher to replace her mutant abilities, giving her superhuman strength. While the upper limits of this power were not explored, the technology allowed Wondra to lift the engine of a freight train over her head. Wondra's power suit and gauntlets also enhanced her with limited invulnerability, as well as the ability to fly with hover discs.

=== Vampire abilities ===
Jubilee gained the powers of a vampire from her transformation by the bite of Xarus, the son of Dracula. They include superhuman strength and speed, and turning into vapor. It is possible that she can heal much faster than a human.

=== Innate traits and abilities ===
Jubilee is a talented gymnast and in-line skater. While living on her own, she used her skills to evade capture while stealing to survive, first from the various shops in the mall and later at the X-Men's Australian base. She has also displayed above average hand-to-hand combat skills, having learned street-fighting techniques while in Los Angeles County Juvenile Hall, and being coached further by Wolverine. She also demonstrated strong leadership abilities, often being placed in a field commander role by Banshee during her closing time with Generation X, and acting as a drill-sergeant figure for the most recent New Warriors team.

In an issue of the Wolverine comic series, it was stated that Jubilee has dyscalculia.

== Reception ==
Andy Quach of MovieWeb included Jubilee in their "Asian Comic Book Characters that Need to Hit the MCU and DCU" list and called her one of the "most storied Asian heroes in all comic book history," writing, "Her character has been through plenty of thrilling storylines in the X-Men comics, any of which could make for an entertaining origin story centered around her."

George Marston of Newsarama included Jubilee in their "20 X-Men characters that should make the jump from Marvel comics to the MCU" list. John Grimaldi of Collider included Jubilee in their "10 Strongest Superhero Sidekicks in Marvel Comics" list. Darren Franich of Entertainment Weekly ranked Jubilee 25th in their "Let's rank every X-Man ever" list. Matthew Perpetua of BuzzFeed ranked Jubilee 28th in their "95 X-Men Members Ranked From Worst To Best" list. CBR.com ranked Jubilee 9th in their "10 Smartest Marvel Sidekicks" list, and ranked her 20th in their "20 Most Powerful Mutants From The '80s" list.

== Other versions ==
=== Abscissa ===
An alternate timeline version of Jubilee who renamed herself "Abscissa" appears in Wolverine (vol. 2) #52-53. This version convinced Mojo to allow the Big Crunch to take place and became his servant.

=== Age of Apocalypse ===
An alternate timeline version of Jubilee appears in Age of Apocalypse. This version is a member of Gambit's X-Ternals who displays a greater level of control over her powers than her Earth-616 counterpart; being able to detonate objects on a molecular level and a Shi'ar ship single-handedly.

=== Amazing Spider-Man: Renew Your Vows ===
An older alternate universe version of Jubilee appears in Amazing Spider-Man: Renew Your Vows (vol. 2) #6. This version works for Magneto, who tasked her with infiltrating Xavier's School for Gifted Children as an instructor.

=== Amalgam Comics ===
In DC vs. Marvel and Age of Amalgam, Jubilee gradually enters a relationship with Robin after their universes are temporarily merged. In the Amalgam Comics universe, Sparrow is a composite character with elements of Robin and Jubilee.

=== Days of Future Past ===
An alternate timeline version of Jubilee appears in Days of Future Past. This version lives with her lover Synch in the ruins of Hollywood.

=== MC2 ===
A possible future version of Jubilee appears in Marvel Comics 2. This version became the leader of the X-People, a temporary member of A-Next, and a reserve member of the Avengers.

=== Mutant X ===
An alternate timeline version of Jubilee appears in Mutant X. This version is the leader of the Marauders.

=== Team X 2000 ===
An alternate timeline version of Jubilee appears in Team X 2000. This version is a member of a resistance movement against Shi'ar Majestrix Alanna, goes by the codename Vertigo, and possesses light-bending powers.

=== Ultimate Marvel ===
An alternate universe version of Jubilee from Earth-1610 appears in Ultimate X-Men. This version is a member of Alpha Flight who possesses a laidback personality.

=== Secret Wars ===
An alternate universe version of Jubilee from the Battleworld domain of Doomstadt appears in the Secret Wars (2015) tie-in miniseries Runaways (vol. 4). This version is a member of the eponymous Runaways, a high school student at the Victor von Doom Institute for Gifted Youths, and the leader of a gang called the Night Witches.

== In other media ==
=== Television ===
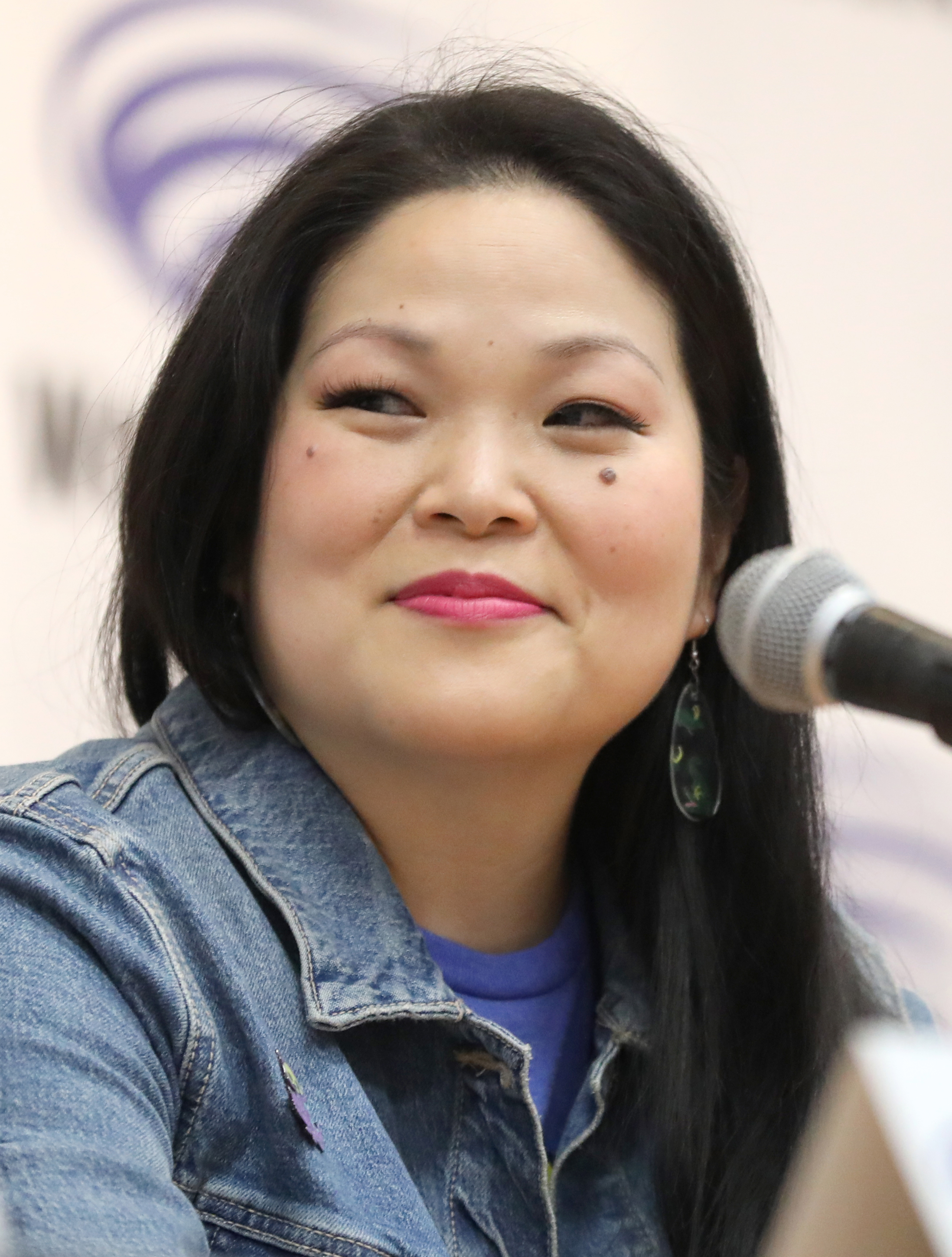
Holly Chou has voiced Jubilee in X-Men '97, a revival of X-Men (1992–97), since 2024.

- Jubilee appears in X-Men: The Animated Series, voiced by Alyson Court. This version lived with a foster family before she was recruited into the X-Men by Cyclops and formed bonds with several of her teammates, such as Gambit and Wolverine. In the series' final episodes, she is redesigned to resemble her Generation X appearance.
  - Jubilee appears in X-Men '97, voiced by Holly Chou. Here, she is a member of the X-Men in the first season before joining Cable's X-Force in the second season. Additionally, Abscissa appears in the first season episode "Motendo", voiced by Alyson Court. This version is a digital replica of Jubilee created by Mojo.
- Jubilee appears in Spider-Man: The Animated Series, voiced again by Alyson Court.
- Jubilee appears in Generation X, portrayed by Heather McComb.
- Jubilee appears in X-Men: Evolution, voiced by Chiara Zanni. This version is a member of the X-Men's junior team, the New Mutants, who displays no connection to Wolverine and lives at the Xavier Institute. After being written out of the third season, a vision of the future reveals she eventually returns to the X-Men.
- An alternate universe variant of Jubilee as the Silver Surfer makes a cameo appearance in the Disney+ series What If...? (2021–2024).

=== Film ===
Lana Condor as Jubilee in X-Men: Apocalypse (2016)

- Jubilee makes a cameo appearance in X-Men (2000), portrayed by Katrina Florece. This version is a contemporary student of the Xavier Institute under Charles Xavier and Storm. While she goes unnamed, Jubilee is identified in a deleted scene.
- Jubilee makes a cameo appearance in X2, portrayed by Kea Wong. She is among the kidnapped students that Colonel William Stryker captures during his raid of the Xavier Institute before Storm and Nightcrawler rescue them.
- Jubilee makes a cameo appearance in X-Men: The Last Stand, portrayed again by Kea Wong.
- Jubilee appears in X-Men: Apocalypse, portrayed by Lana Condor. This version is a student of the Xavier Institute from 1983. She was meant to play a larger role in the film, but most of her scenes were cut from the theatrical version and later included as deleted scenes in subsequent home releases. Condor also appears as Jubilee in an in-universe commercial for the Xavier school.

=== Video games ===
- Jubilee appears as an assist character in Marvel vs. Capcom: Clash of Super Heroes, voiced again by Alyson Court.
- Jubilee makes a cameo appearance in Wolverine.
- Jubilee appears as an unlockable playable character in X-Men Legends, voiced by Danica McKellar.
- Jubilee appears in Marvel Heroes, voiced by Aly Casas.
- Jubilee appears as a playable character in Marvel Future Fight.
- Jubilee appears as a playable character in Marvel Puzzle Quest.
- Jubilee appears as a playable character in Marvel Strike Force.
- Jubilee appears in Marvel Snap.
- Jubilee appears as a playable character in Marvel Super War.
- Jubilee appears as a playable character in Marvel Rivals, voiced by Courtney Lin. In this iteration, Jubilee works with an alternate, seemingly nobler version of Apocalypse, becoming his Horseman of Famine in the process, which enhances her mutant abilities but also restores her vampiric abilities.
- Jubilee appears as a Season 1 DLC character in Marvel Tōkon: Fighting Souls, along with Phoenix Cyclops, Jane Foster (Thor), and Venom.

=== Miscellaneous ===
Jubilee appears in the novelization for X2. Amidst William Stryker's raid of the Xavier Institute, she absorbs electricity from a taser and blasts one of Stryker's men through a wall, but is ultimately captured. While in captivity, she rallies her fellow captured students before they are rescued.
