= Hummingbird (comics) =

- Hummingbird as depicted in The New Warriors (vol. 5) #2 (March 2014). Art by Marcus To (penciler/inker) and David Curiel (colorist).

Publication information
- Publisher: Marvel Comics
- First appearance: Scarlet Spider (vol. 2) #1 (January 2012)
- Created by: Ryan Stegman (artist); Christopher Yost (writer); Carlo Barberi (costume designer)

In-story information
- Alter ego: Aracely Penalba
- Team affiliations: New Warriors
- Abilities: Emotional manipuation Telepathy; Flight; Pyrokinesis

Hummingbird (María Aracely Penalba) is a fictional superhero appearing in American comic books published by Marvel Comics. She made her debut in the 2012 Scarlet Spider comic book series written by Christopher Yost. The character is depicted as being from Mexico.

== Publication history ==
Created by artist Ryan Stegman and writer Christopher Yost, she first appeared in Scarlet Spider vol. 2 #1. She took on the superhero identity of Hummingbird during Scarlet Spider vol. 2 #17, with artist Carlo Barberi designing her costume.

Along with Kaine, the Scarlet Spider, she joined the New Warriors on the 2014 Volume 5 version of the team.

== Fictional character biography ==
Aracely as depicted in Scarlet Spider #16 (April 2013). Art by Khoi Pham and Antonio Fabela.

María Aracely Penalba is originally from Mexico. She is the only survivor of a human trafficking operation by the Lobo Cartel, who smuggled her from Mexico to Houston. Aracely is rescued by Kaine Parker, who had been passing through the area. Aracely manifests superhuman abilities and a preternatural knowledge of Kaine's location and thoughts. Though Kaine had planned to move on from Houston, he is convinced to stay in the area and look after Aracely.

Shortly afterward, Aracely has recurring dreams filled with mythological imagery. During the first of these dreams, Aracely finds herself in Aztlán, the ancestral home of the Aztec people. There, she meets a coyote who tells her that the Fifth Era is ending and that she is Huītzilōpōchtli, the Left-Handed Hummingbird who will be killed during the apocalypse.

As Aracely and Kaine discuss her dreams, their significance, and what to do about them, they are met by Carlos Lobo and his sister Esmeralda. In the ensuing fight, Kaine sacrifices himself to allow Aracely to escape. When Lobo catches up to Aracely, he reveals that he believes her to be the reincarnation of Huītzilōpōchtli. Hiding inside a trash container, Aracely remembers that the Lobo Cartel trafficked her at the insistence of Mr. Moctezuma, a mysterious old man accompanied by a coyote. Kaine returns in the form of a monstrous spider, having accepted the power of the Other, and forces Lobo to flee. Aracely proclaims Kaine as her champion, which restores him to his human form while retaining the Other's powers. Following their battle with Lobo, Kaine and Aracely join the New Warriors.

== Powers and abilities ==
Hummingbird is able to fly and possesses psychic abilities that allow her to detect the emotions of others and sense their locations. She possesses a special connection with Kaine, being able to sense him even from great distances.

Hummingbird is able to generate sacred fire, which she uses to kill a demon who attempted to possess Thor. However, she is overcome by Huītzilōpōchtli and has no memory of the event.
