= Nitro (character) =

Fictional comic book villain

- Nitro; Cover to Captain Marvel #34, by Jim Starlin.

Publication information
- Publisher: Marvel Comics
- First appearance: Captain Marvel #34 (September 1974)
- Created by: Jim Starlin (writer); Steve Englehart (artist)

In-story information
- Alter ego: Robert Hunter
- Species: Human mutate
- Notable aliases: Exploding Man; Living Bomb
- Abilities: Self-detonation and reformation

Nitro (Robert Hunter) is a supervillain appearing in American comic books published by Marvel Comics. He first appeared in 1974.

Nitro is known for playing a part in the death of the Kree superhero Mar-Vell. He is also known for being responsible for the devastation of Stamford, Connecticut, which began Marvel's "Civil War" event.

== Publication history ==
Nitro first appeared in Captain Marvel #34 (September 1974) and was created by Jim Starlin.

== Fictional character biography ==
Robert Hunter was born in Scranton, Pennsylvania. He was an electrical engineer. Due to genetic alteration performed by the Kree Lunatic Legion, Hunter gains the ability to explode and reform himself at will and becomes a professional criminal. In his first appearance, he exposes Captain Marvel to a carcinogenic nerve gas, which later caused Mar-Vell to develop cancer and die. Since then, Nitro has clashed with Earth's superhumans, who have found creative ways to defeat him, such as preventing him from reforming his body after exploding.

At the start of the Civil War storyline, Nitro escapes prison along with Cobalt Man, Speedfreek, and Coldheart. When the New Warriors confront him, Nitro causes a massive explosion that kills Cobalt Man, Speedfreek, Coldheart, most of the New Warriors present, and 600 civilians in Stamford, Connecticut.

After destroying Stamford, Nitro escapes and is pursued by Wolverine. Wolverine captures Nitro and cuts off his right arm before leaving him in the custody of Atlantis. Nitro is held prisoner in Latveria until Penance, the sole survivor of the Stamford explosion, brings him back to the United States.

== Powers and abilities ==
Nitro can forcefully convert his whole body into gas, resulting in a violent explosion. This transformation can be limited to discrete portions of himself, such as his fist and aim the force in a specific direction. While in a gaseous form, he cannot reform if any fraction of his body is separated from the rest and must completely reconstitute himself before detonating again.

== In other media ==
=== Television ===
Nitro appears in the Wolverine and the X-Men episode "Time Bomb", voiced by Liam O'Brien. This version is a mutant who was willingly imprisoned due to lacking control of his powers.

=== Video games ===
- Nitro appears in Marvel: Ultimate Alliance 2, voiced by Steve Blum.
- Nitro appears as a boss in Marvel Avengers Alliance.
