= Redneck (comics) =

- Skybolt. Art by Paco Medina.

Publication information
- Publisher: Marvel Comics
- First appearance: New X-Men #126 (July 2002)
- Created by: Grant Morrison; Frank Quitely

In-story information
- Alter ego: Vincent "Vin" Stewart
- Team affiliations: New Warriors; Xavier Institute; Omega Gang
- Notable aliases: Skybolt
- Abilities: Uses weaponry and flight pack derived from the designs of the Beetle; Depowered, formerly: Heat generation

Vincent Stewart, codenamed Redneck and later Skybolt is a fictional mutant character appearing in American comic books published by Marvel Comics.

== Publication history ==
His first appearance was in New X-Men #126 by Grant Morrison and Frank Quitely.

== Fictional character biography ==
Vincent Stewart, also known as Redneck, is a mutant from Arkansas who experienced anti-mutant violence firsthand before becoming a student at the Xavier Institute. Sometime after, Redneck joins Quentin Quire's gang of mutants, dubbed the Omega Gang. The Omega Gang attack a small group of humans to avenge the death of mutant fashion designer Jumbo Carnation.

After he and the Omega Gang start a riot at the Xavier Institute, Redneck is sent to prison and sentenced to charity work overseas after he is released.

Redneck loses his powers after the events of M-Day along with countless other mutants. He is offered membership in the New Warriors under the name Skybolt, utilizing a flight suit and weaponry based on the designs of the Beetle and the Turbo suit to replace his lost powers. Skybolt is later killed along with Ripcord.

== Powers and abilities ==
Using a suit and weapons derived from technology used by the Beetle and Turbo, Skybolt can fly and fire an array of both lethal and non-lethal projectiles from his wrist-mounted gauntlets. He is also armored in an osmium alloy, making him durable enough to act as a human battering ram.

Before losing his mutant powers, Redneck had the superhuman ability to generate intense heat from his hands.
