= Terrax =

Fictional comic book character

- Terrax as depicted in Fantastic Four #242 (May 1982). Art by John Byrne.

Publication information
- Publisher: Marvel Comics
- First appearance: Fantastic Four #211 (Oct. 1979)
- Created by: Marv Wolfman (writer); John Byrne (artist)

In-story information
- Alter ego: Tyros
- Species: Mutant Birjan
- Team affiliations: Heralds of Galactus; Offenders; Legion of the Unliving; The Cabal
- Notable aliases: Tyros the Terrible; Terrax the Tamer
- Abilities: Superhuman strength, stamina, durability, speed, agility, reflexes, and longevity; Flight; Energy manipulation; Geokinesis; Use of Cosmic Axe

Terrax the Tamer (/ˈtɛræks/) is a character appearing in American comic books published by Marvel Comics. Created by artist John Byrne and writer Marv Wolfman, the character first appeared in October 1979, and is a herald of cosmic entity Galactus and enemy of the Fantastic Four.

The character has made several appearances in media, including several animated television shows, video games and was included in the Marvel Legends and Minimate toylines.

== Publication history ==
Terrax the Tamer was created by writer Marv Wolfman and artist John Byrne, first appearing in Fantastic Four #211 (Oct. 1979). The character was introduced as a new Herald of Galactus, replacing the Silver Surfer in that role within the Fantastic Four series.

Wolfman and Byrne developed Terrax as a deliberately more brutal and self-serving herald compared to his predecessors, driven by ambition and fear rather than loyalty. His early appearances were in Fantastic Four issues #210–213 (1979), before returning prominently in issues #242–243 (May–June 1982), when John Byrne, now as writer-artist on the series, had Galactus strip Terrax of his powers after he threatened Earth.

Following his initial storyline, Terrax appeared in a number of other titles, including Dazzler, The New Warriors, and the Annihilation crossover event (2006–2007). The character has been featured in entries of the Official Handbook of the Marvel Universe, reflecting his importance as a recurring cosmic villain in the Marvel Universe.

== Fictional character biography ==
=== Origin ===
Terrax was originally a Birjan named Tyros, the ruler of the city-state of Lanlak on the planetoid Birj. The cosmic entity Galactus selects Tyros as his next Herald, but first wishes for the Fantastic Four to humble him. In return, Galactus agrees to travel to Earth to aid the heroes against a new threat, the villain Sphinx. Tyros is defeated and brought before Galactus, who transforms him into Terrax. This gives him enhanced control over the earth and the ability to survive in space, as well as a Cosmic Axe. Terrax travels with Galactus to Earth and, while his new master battles the Sphinx, attacks the Fantastic Four—still resenting the heroes for their role in his transformation. Terrax, however, is tricked and defeated by the Human Torch, and leaves with a victorious Galactus.

=== Rebellion ===
When Galactus discovers what he has done, Terrax flees to Earth and levitates the entire island of Manhattan into orbit. He bargains with the Fantastic Four, stating that he will spare Manhattan if they kill Galactus. Galactus strips Terrax of his powers and throws him from the top of the World Trade Center down to the street below. Terrax survives the fall and is taken to hospital, where he remains in a semi-comatose state, and loses his powers and forgets his identity as Terrax.

Doctor Doom learns that Terrax has survived and kidnaps him, intending to use him against the Fantastic Four. Doom gives Tyros limited cosmic powers using a device that he created and sends him to attack the Fantastic Four. Unknown to Tyros, the power Doom gave him would consume his body within hours. Tyros is confronted by the Silver Surfer and is forced to push his powers to their limits in the ensuing battle. During the battle, Tyros is consumed by his power and dies.

In an Avengers annual, Terrax is temporarily resurrected to become a member of the second Legion of the Unliving by the Elder of the Universe the Grandmaster.

Tyros reforms his physical form as Terrax in the title New Warriors, and battles the fledgling superhero team. Terrax is defeated when the heroes, deducing that his form is unstable and that constant contact with earth is required, separate him and thereby his form. Terrax reappears when reformed once again by a rogue scientist attempting to steal his power. He uses the scientist as a host body and again battles the New Warriors and Fantastic Four. The Silver Surfer intervenes and maroons Terrax on the deserted planet Pluraris IV.

Terrax appears in the Annihilation storyline, being initially captured by the forces of Annihilus before escaping with the Skrull Paibok. Terrax later finds a world ruled by the Space Parasite, whom he eventually kills. On discovering that the inhabitants are content to live in subservience, he flies into a rage and destroys the planet.

In the title Hulk, Terrax is plucked from continuity by the Grandmaster to be part of a team called the Offenders in a bid to thwart the Hulk.

== Powers and abilities ==
Tyros is an alien with a genetic mutation that gives him the limited psionic ability to manipulate rock and earth molecules. After being transformed by Galactus's Power Cosmic, he can perform near-limitless feats, such as moving asteroids, meteors, and even whole planets from space at high speeds, affect tectonic plates to cause earthquakes and create chasms, or levitate large landmasses miles into the air. Like all Heralds, Terrax has immense strength, stamina, durability, speed, agility, reflexes, and lifespan, as well as hypersonic flight, energy control, and sustained metabolism. He wielded a cosmic axe, which had several powers of its own.

== Other versions ==
=== MC2 ===
A future version of Terrax from Earth-982 appears in the MC2 title Fantastic Five.

=== Terrax the Truly Enlightened ===
An alternate universe version of Terrax from an unidentified universe appears in New Avengers (vol. 3). After his universe is destroyed by Galactus to prevent an incursion with Earth-616, which would destroy both universes, Terrax goes on to join the Cabal to stop further incursions.

== In other media ==
=== Television ===
- Terrax appears in Fantastic Four (1994), voiced by Tony Jay in the first season and Ron Feinberg in the second. After he attempts to kill Galactus, Galactus transforms him into a colony of earthworms and banishes him to Earth.
- Terrax appears in The Super Hero Squad Show episode "Last Exit Before Doomsday!", voiced by Ted Biaselli.
- Terrax appears in The Avengers: Earth's Mightiest Heroes series finale "Avengers Assemble", voiced by Kevin Grevioux.
- Terrax appears in the Hulk and the Agents of S.M.A.S.H. episode "Galactus Goes Green", voiced by James C. Mathis III.
- Terrax appears in the Ultimate Spider-Man episode "Contest of Champions", voiced again by James C. Mathis III.

=== Film ===
Terrax appears in LEGO Marvel Avengers: Mission Demolition, voiced by Kevin Smith. This version is a human named Terry who transforms into Terrax after stealing a cosmic axe.

=== Video games ===
- Terrax appears as a boss in the Game Boy Advance port of Fantastic 4 - Flame On.
- Terrax appears in Fantastic Four: Rise of the Silver Surfer, voiced by Fred Tatasciore.

=== Merchandise ===
- Terrax was released as a build-a-figure in the Marvel Legends toyline in January 2012, later being rereleased in a multipack in 2023.
- A Terrax Minimate was released as part of the Toys R Us exclusive Heralds of Galactus boxset.
