= Slapstick (character) =

- Slapstick and Ghost Rider in the cover of The Awesome Slapstick #4 (February 1993). Art by James Fry.

Publication information
- Publisher: Marvel Comics
- First appearance: The Awesome Slapstick #1 (November 1992)
- Created by: Len Kaminski; James Fry

In-story information
- Alter ego: Steven Winsor McCay Harmon
- Team affiliations: New Warriors; The Initiative; Counter Force; Heroes for Hire; Mercs for Money
- Abilities: Experienced practical joker "Cartoon Physics" grants: Superhuman agility, durability and reflexes Enhanced strength when electrocuted Indestructibility; Virtually unlimited malleability Minimal reality manipulation

Slapstick (Steve Harmon) is a fictional superhero appearing in American comic books published by Marvel Comics. He resembles an animated clown and has the abilities of a slapstick cartoon character, such as one from Looney Tunes, including warping reality to match that of an animated cartoon.

== Publication history ==
Slapstick debuted November 1992 in The Awesome Slapstick #1 and was created by writer Len Kaminski and artist James Fry. Afterwards, he made a notable appearance with the New Warriors in Marvel Comics Presents and was unseen until a "Civil War" cameo in She-Hulk. He also regularly appeared in Avengers: The Initiative as a recruit.

In 2015, Slapstick became a regular member of the Mercs for Money series. In 2017, he got a second solo series created by Reilly Brown, Fred Van Lente and Diego Olortegui that lasted six issues.

In Slapstick #4, Slapstick's full name is revealed to be Steven Winsor McCay Harmon, a reference to animator Winsor McCay.

== Fictional character biography ==
Slapstick was originally junior high school class clown Steve Harmon, from New York City. In a plan to get back at his arch-rival, Winston, Steve dresses as a clown to blend into the crowd at a strange new carnival.

Before Steve can enact his plan, Winston and his date, Heather, are kidnapped by clowns. Steve picks up a mallet as a weapon and follows them. The group enters a portal disguised as a mirror at a carnival funhouse. Steve is stretched across dimensions and transformed into a form made of unstable molecules, which essentially makes him a living cartoon character. The Scientist Supreme of Dimension X, who resembles Groucho Marx, helps Steve master his powers and free the prisoners from the clowns. Steve destroys the mirror, preventing the clowns from influencing reality. Minutes afterward, Steve is found by his best friend, Mike Peterson, who agrees to assist him.

=== Other enemies ===
Steve has other villains to confront: a Punisher copycat called the Overkiller attacks Steve, believing him to be a mutant. The two fight in a mall, destroying most of it. Steve ends the fight by kissing Overkiller and then walloping him as he reacts with disgust. Slapstick also battles the super smart, preteen Dr. Denton and Teddy, and rescued Barbara Halsey. Slapstick later encounters the Neutron Bum, a homeless man with the power to cause explosions. Dozens of superheroes gather to battle Neutron Bum, but Slapstick neutralizes the situation by getting him what he had desired — a cup of coffee — and attacking him as he is drinking it.

Later, Slapstick works with the New Warriors to fight Dr. Yesterday, partly because doing so will impress women. At some point prior to Justice and Firestar leaving the New Warriors to become Avengers, Slapstick and Ultra Girl assist the New Warriors in thwarting a Badoon invasion and officially join the group.

=== The Initiative ===
Slapstick is later seen on the bus of new recruits arriving at Camp Hammond as part of the Initiative training program. He is later seen, with other heroes, confronting Ben Grimm as part of a training mission.

Slapstick and other Camp Hammond members are sent out as crowd control when the Hulk and his Warbound crew leads an attack on New York. He is assigned morale support for the evacuating citizens under command of the Avenger Triathlon. A fellow recruit, Rage, leads a rebellion against the crowd support mission in order to go confront the Hulk. Slapstick joins in. His team is swiftly defeated by the Hulk's forces.

The recruits are imprisoned by Hulk's forces in Madison Square Garden and neutralized with power-sapping technology. They are rescued by black ops forces associated with the Camp.

Later it is Slapstick who attacks and almost kills Gauntlet out of loyalty to the New Warriors, in retaliation for Gauntlet's use of the team's name as an insult. He has since tried to admit this to his teammates, but is always comically interrupted. He later comes in possession of a device containing the memory and personality of KIA, a villainous clone of Michael Van Patrick, and decides to keep it for further use.

Slapstick and several other former New Warriors are recruited by Justice and apparently deserted from the Initiative, after Justice finds evidence of shady activities within the organization. After helping stop KIA's rampage, this new group officially quits the Initiative, intending to act as a form of independent oversight for the program. As legally registered heroes, they are free to act unless they break the law while doing so. When asked to change to his human form, Slapstick admits that he has not done so since joining the Initiative, and claims that the mechanism that activates the change no longer works.

He later returned to Camp Hammond with the team, now calling themselves the New Warriors again, and battled Ragnarok, a cyborg clone of Thor. Slapstick is also a noted presence in the multi-hero effort to rebuild New York after the events of World War Hulk.

=== Fear Itself ===
During the Fear Itself storyline, Slapstick appears at a meeting held by Prodigy regarding magical hammers that have crashed into the earth. He later joins forces with other heroes to battle the Worthy.

=== Mercs for Money ===
When Deadpool founds Mercs for Money, he employs Slapstick and other vigilantes to pose as him and extend his reach across the globe.

== Powers and abilities ==
As Slapstick, Steve Harmon's body is made out of Electroplasm, which makes him indestructible. Any damage that he takes can be immediately shaken off, as he possesses superhuman durability and malleability in the manner of an animated slapstick cartoon character. Slapstick also possesses superhuman agility and reflexes. The molecular bonds of the Electroplasm can be disrupted by a specific frequency of energy, reducing Slapstick to an immobile puddle; however, another energy charge restores him to normal. In addition, Slapstick gets temporarily stronger when electrocuted. However, he must have a consistent feed of electricity to maintain this strength.

Slapstick's gloves also possess alien technology. His left glove has a transformation inducer that allows him to transform to and from Slapstick to his human form. His right glove contains an extra-dimensional storage pocket, which functions similar to cartoon hammerspace and allows him to access items seemingly nowhere. He can access these items by making a special gesture with that hand, though to anyone observing it would appear he is pulling them out of thin air. He usually keeps a large mallet in this space.

== Other versions ==
An alternate universe version of Slapstick from Earth-1298 appears in Mutant X as a member of the Lethal Legion, a group of supernatural heroes, who is later killed by Madelyne Pryor.

== In other media ==
- Slapstick makes a cameo appearance in Deadpool's ending in Ultimate Marvel vs. Capcom 3.
- Slapstick appears as a playable character in Marvel: Future Fight.

== Collected editions ==
Title	Material Collected	Published Date	ISBN
Slapstick: That's Not Funny	Slapstick (vol. 2) #1-6	August 15, 2017	978-1302903350
