= Vance Astrovik =

Fictional mutant superhero appearing in Marvel Comics

- Justice. Art by Jim Cheung.

Publication information
- Publisher: Marvel Comics
- First appearance: Giant-Size Defenders #5 (July 1975)
- Created by: Don Heck (artist); Gerry Conway (writer)

In-story information
- Alter ego: Vance Astrovik
- Species: Human mutant
- Team affiliations: Counter Force; The Initiative; Avengers; New Warriors; Unlimited Class Wrestling Federation; Avengers Academy; C.R.A.D.L.E.
- Notable aliases: Justice, Marvel Boy, Manglin' John Mahoney, Marvel Man, The Astounding Astrovik, Squire Justice
- Abilities: Telekinesis; High-speed flight

Vance Astrovik, also known as Justice and formerly known as Marvel Boy, is a superhero appearing in American comic books published by Marvel Comics. The character possesses the superhuman power of telekinesis and has often been affiliated with the New Warriors and The Avengers.

== Publication history ==
He appeared in Giant-Size Defenders #5 (July 1975) for the first time, which was created by Don Heck and Gerry Conway.

More than a decade after his creation, Vance appeared first as a mainstay in The New Warriors and later in the third volume of the Avengers titles. He usually appeared with Firestar, who was his girlfriend and then fiancee.

In 1994, he had his own four-issue limited series, Justice: Four Balance and appeared in the I (heart) Marvel: Masked Intentions one-shot in 2006.

He was a major character in Avengers: The Initiative early in the series.

Justice appeared as a supporting character in Avengers Academy from issue #1 (Aug. 2010) through issue #20 (Dec. 2011).

== Fictional character biography ==
Vance Astrovik was born in Saugerties, New York to Jewish parents.

He was visited as a teenager by an alternate, time-travelling version of his future self, Major Vance Astro of the Guardians of the Galaxy, an astronaut who had volunteered for an experimental space flight and consequently been lost in space in cryogenic suspension for a thousand years. Astro convinces his younger self not to become an astronaut and, in the process, sparked the premature emergence of Astrovik's telekinetic powers.

=== Early adventures ===
After his powers emerge, Vance's father, Arnold, begins to physically abuse him for being "different". After running away from home, Vance becomes a professional wrestler in the Unlimited Class Wrestling Federation, a circuit for superhuman competitors. While wrestling as "Manglin' John Mahoney", he befriends Ben Grimm, a.k.a. the Thing, who was estranged from the Fantastic Four. Eventually, Vance is convinced to return home, with assurances from his parents that the abuse would stop.

=== New Warriors ===
When Marvel Boy is rejected for membership in the Avengers by Captain America, he helps found a team of teenage superheroes, the New Warriors, led by Night Thrasher. Vance develops friendships with the other Warriors and a romantic relationship with teammate Firestar, and his powers increase both in strength and skill. However, his costumed activities renew Arnold Astrovik's prejudice towards Vance.

=== Murder trial ===
In one burst of his ever-growing superpowers and pent-up emotion, Vance lashes out at his father and unintentionally kills him. Vance turns himself in and goes to trial, charged with first-degree murder and negligent homicide. He is defended by attorney Foggy Nelson. The Thing is a character witness for Vance and helps establish the history of abuse that he suffered, as did his mother Norma Astrovik; other testimony established the good he had done as a costumed hero and his increasing competence with his powers. However, the prosecuting attorney Rachel Dreyfuss pursues the latter angle, using testimony from Firestar and cross-examination of Norma to establish that Vance could have used his powers to stop his father without lethal force. During her closing argument, Dreyfuss draws a gun on Vance and fires a blank round. Instinctively, Vance not only disarms Dreyfuss but reacts so precisely that he contains the smoke from the gun, driving home the prosecution's case. Vance is acquitted of murder, but is convicted of negligent homicide and imprisoned in the Vault. As a result of the trial, Vance's secret identity becomes public knowledge.

During his stay in the Vault, Vance trains with the Guardsmen, determined to hone his abilities to prevent another incident like his father's death. When a riot breaks out over the perception of poor living conditions, Vance helps calm the riot by convincing the warden to give Terraformer, a plant-based villain, access to a plant. Despite the warden's fears that Terraformer would use the plant in an escape attempt, he simply enjoys it being with him. This calms the other prisoners, and it is agreed that their living conditions will be examined on a case-by-case basis to accommodate the prisoners' needs.

=== Justice ===
After his time in the Vault, Vance takes the new codename Justice. He goes undercover working with Shinobi Shaw to spy on the activities in the so-called "Younghunt".

When Sphinx disperses members of the New Warriors throughout history, Vance encounters his father Arnold as an adolescent. He discovered that Arnold was homosexual and bullied into accepting a heterosexual lifestyle by his own abusive father. Understanding that his father was as much a victim as he was, Vance attempts to change history by threatening his grandfather, but stops when he realized that he was perpetuating the cycle of violence. Though the timeline remains unchanged, Vance makes a measure of peace with his father.

=== The Avengers ===
Vance and Firestar are affected by Morgan le Fay's reality alteration and turned into superpowered enforcers under her command. However, several of the Avengers break free of the control based on their deep belief in the team itself. Vance comes to his senses despite never being an Avenger, which surprises the remaining heroes. After the threat of le Fay is ended and Vance and Firestar prove themselves by defeating Whirlwind on their own, they manage to join the Avengers.

After the House of M ends, Justice and Firestar are unaffected by the global depowerment of mutants and thus retain their powers. Vance's wish for more in their relationship, as opposed to Firestar's wish for less (being ages 22 and 19, respectively), ends their engagement and their relationship.

=== Civil War ===
Justice and former teammate Rage learn that people are hunting down former New Warriors members because of perceived blame for Nitro's devastation of Stamford, Connecticut, which killed several of the New Warriors. They both seek out the legal services of Jennifer Walters (She-Hulk) in protecting the allies of the New Warriors, as their identities had already been publicly exposed. The two eventually discover that former New Warriors member Carlton LaFroyge (Hindsight) was responsible for the persecution and exposure of their teammates.

Both Rage and Justice refuse to comply with the proposed Superhuman Registration Act. They go on to join Captain America's anti-registration group, the Secret Avengers.

=== The Initiative ===
After the Civil War, Justice was recruited by Iron Man to head the youth outreach arm of The Initiative superhero training program. He is unaware of some of the shadier aspects of the program, and is irritated by the Initiative "Drill Sergeant" Gauntlet's constant demeaning and disparaging remarks about the deceased New Warriors. During the investigation of former New Warriors members due to an attack upon Gauntlet, it is revealed that Justice is romantically involved with Initiative trainee Ultra Girl.

Justice's personal investigation into the fate of Initiative recruit MVP leads him to uncover the morally ambiguous activities of the Initiative, instituted by Camp Hammond director Henry Peter Gyrich. As a result, Justice apparently deserts from the Initiative to continue his investigation, recruiting Ultra Girl, Rage, and former New Warriors Debrii and Slapstick to his cause. Justice's group officially informs Iron Man of their intention to quit the Initiative and act as Counter Force, a form of independent oversight for the program.

=== Heroic Age ===
Vance becomes one of the teaching staff of "Avengers Academy", alongside former Avengers teammates Hank Pym, Tigra, Quicksilver, and former New Warriors teammate Speedball. One of his students, Veil, has a secret crush on him until she finds out that he has renewed his relationship with Ultra Girl. His relationship with Ultra Girl is further complicated during the Avengers Academy Prom Night when Firestar appears.

During the "Outlawed" storyline, a law is passed that forbids superheroes who are below the age of 21. Justice serves as a member of C.R.A.D.L.E., a group enforcing the law.

== Powers and abilities ==
Justice is a mutant who possesses telekinesis. By using his powers to lift himself, he can levitate and fly at high speed. He has shown the ability to hold a large number of people. Initially, Justice's telekinesis was limited in its scope, and using them at the peak level of his power would cause him headaches and nosebleeds. However, his powers later increased dramatically, and he was no longer hindered by the physical symptoms he had once suffered from.

== In other media ==
- Vance Astrovik as Marvel Boy makes non-speaking cameo appearances in Fantastic Four as a member of the New Warriors.
- Vance Astrovik as Justice appears as a non-playable character in Marvel: Ultimate Alliance 2, voiced by Sean Donnellan.
