= Guerrilla Girl =

Guerrilla Girl may refer to:

- Guerrilla Girls, an anonymous group of radical feminist, female artists
- Guerrilla Girl (1953 film)
- Guerrilla Girl (2005 film)

== See also ==
- Gorilla Girl, a superheroine in Marvel Comics
