= Avengers: The Initiative =

Comic book series from Marvel Comics

- Avengers: The Initiative #1 solicited cover

Publication information
- Publisher: Marvel Comics
- Schedule: Monthly
- Format: Ongoing series
- Genre: Superhero
- Publication date: April 2007 – July 2010
- No. of issues: 35
- Main character(s): Trainees: Melee Graduates: 3-D Man; Annex; Ant-Man; Cloud 9 Geiger; Gorilla Girl; Hardball; Komodo; Prodigy; Red Nine; Stature; Sunstreak; Thor Girl; Ultra Girl Staff: Diamondback; Gauntlet; Penance; Taskmaster; Trauma; Baron Von Blitzschlag

Creative team
- Written by: Dan Slott; Christos Gage
- Penciller(s): Stefano Caselli; Steve Uy; Harvey Tolibao

Avengers: The Initiative is a comic book series from Marvel Comics. Written by Dan Slott and Christos Gage with artwork initially by Stefano Caselli, Steve Uy and Harvey Tolibao, the series handles the aftermath of Marvel's "Civil War" storyline (however, it should not be confused with "The Initiative" a banner running across Marvel books from Feb. 2007 to May 2007, similar to Marvel's earlier "Decimation" banner after the "House of M" storyline, or the Civil War: The Initiative special by Brian Michael Bendis). A preview of the title was shown in Civil War: The Initiative.

== Publication history ==
The first issue of Avengers: The Initiative was released on 4 April 2007. The tagline initially used in solicitations was "Marvel's Army of Super Heroes just became a Super Hero Army".

The series was originally solicited as a six issue limited series, but prior to the publication of the first issue, Marvel announced that this had changed and that Avengers: The Initiative would become an ongoing series, the third regularly published 'Avengers' title from 2007 onwards, after New Avengers and The Mighty Avengers.

Issues #20-22 handled "Dark Reign", the aftermath to Secret Invasion, and Christos Gage moved to full writing duties.

The series was cancelled after Avengers: The Initiative #35 (April 2010), at the conclusion of the "Siege" storyline and replaced by Avengers Academy.

== Fictional history ==
=== First recruit group ===
In the aftermath of the Civil War, the pro-registration side stood victorious and launched the Fifty State Initiative, which called for one S.H.I.E.L.D.-sponsored superhero team for each state. The series focused on the training facility at Camp Hammond in Stamford, Connecticut.

The first group of young heroes has been sent to hero boot camp in Stamford, the site of the explosion that launched the whole Civil War. During the first day's training, Trauma, a shapeshifter, loses control of his power and causes Armory to have a panic attack. She accidentally shoots MVP, who was trying to save Cloud 9. Pym and Gyrich agree to conceal the death and expel Armory, but first, amputate her alien weaponry, since she will be an unregistered super. As the young heroes finish the obstacle course, Trauma loses control of his transformation again, feeding off of Cloud 9's guilt at being responsible for MVP's death. As Justice and Gauntlet clean up the situation, Pym is called to the lab where Baron Von Blitzschlag informs him and Henry Peter Gyrich of MVP's anatomy; instead of being enhanced by the Super Soldier Serum as everyone believed, he is actually an "Übermensch", the ultimate human specimen. As Blitzschlag and Gyrich laud the benefits of such a test subject, Pym has a crisis of conscience.

A crisis over Texas occurs involving the President and Hydra. Cloud 9, Komodo, Hardball, Gauntlet, War Machine, Justice, and Yellowjacket all arrive on the scene. Cloud 9 is revealed as the best marksman of the bunch when she receives a pulse rifle, but she feels guilty when she blows up a fighter jet and the pilot does not eject.

Hardball speaks to Komodo about Justice apparently having learned of MVP's fate. While he talks, he turns to see not Komodo but a strange girl sleeping next to him. Komodo is upset that her identity was revealed. Spider-Man battles the duo. He quickly incapacitates War Machine with a blast of webbing that shuts down his armor, but not before War Machine mysteriously states that even though Spider-Man will be stripped of his powers, another Spider-Man will exist. While Komodo fares much better, Spider-Man's wit, and a threat that her failure will cause her losing her powers, help him to defeat her and slip away easily. A mysterious third party, which War Machine calls "Red Team" and which has been cloaked during the fight, is revealed to be a group of people in duplicate versions of Tony Stark's Spider-Man armor. The story ends with Komodo's desperate plea not to be stripped of her powers, as she dislikes being normal and considers her other self to be a nobody.

=== World War Hulk ===
The recruits are ordered to stay away from the fighting, but to still help with evacuation efforts. Rage and several other recruits disobey the direct order and go to help the Avengers. They are quickly dispatched by Hulk's Warbound and imprisoned in Madison Square Garden. Gyrich fears the political fallout, so he orders his Shadow Initiative to rescue only the six missing recruits. This team comprises Bengal, Trauma, Constrictor, Mutant Zero, and the Scarlet Spiders. Hulk eventually discovers the team and Trauma attempts to access Hulk's greatest fear, but Hulk tells him he fears nothing and nearly beats him to death.

During these events, Hardball is secretly recruited by Hydra to steal nanotechnology. While in disguise, he sees MVP's body cryogenically frozen, but Justice and Cloud 9 claim to have seen him at his parents’ home. Gauntlet is mysteriously attacked and can no longer train the recruits.

=== Second recruit group ===
Several new Initiative recruits arrive at Camp Hammond, including Ant-Man (Eric O'Grady), Crusader (Z'Reg), Melee, Geldoff, Dragon Lord (Tako Shamara), Geiger, Red Nine, and Diamondback. These recruits are mainly trained by the instructor Taskmaster.

The results of the previous cloning's of MVP impressed Initiative administrators enough to fill places within the Fifty State Initiative with further clones of MVP.

=== Killed in Action ===
A new clone of Michael Van Patrick is fitted with the Tactigon, Armory's former alien weapon, but goes on a rampage throughout the base under the new name "KIA", seeking revenge for MVP's death. The KIA clone causes destruction, killing Dragon Lord and Van (one of the Scarlet Spiders). KIA also caused injury to many initiative trainees and staff like Thor Girl, Gauntlet, Constrictor and Crusader. He also killed eight S.H.I.E.L.D. agents on his rampage. He is eventually subdued when Cloud 9 uses the knowledge of Michael Van Patrick's crush on her to kiss him and fill him with gas. The reformed New Warriors and New Avengers can subdue him and mind wipe him with a device from Baron Von Blitzschlag.

=== First graduations ===
Some of the first installment trainees made it to graduation. The graduating class and their assignments were:

- Cloud 9: Montana - Freedom Force
- Hardball: Nevada - Heavy Hitters
- Thor Girl: Georgia - The Cavalry
- Komodo: Arizona - Desert Stars
- Trauma: remains on base as a counselor
- Triathlon (now going by 3-D Man and sporting the costume of his namesake): Hawaii -Point Men
- Ultra Girl (now wearing Ms. Marvel's original costume): Georgia -The Cavalry

Justice, Debrii, Slapstick, Rage, MVP, and the two remaining Scarlet Spiders leave the Initiative to form Counter Force, described as a counter-initiative that will dedicate themselves to keeping the government program honest.

=== More recruits ===
Starting with issue #13, the series features new recruits Annex, Prodigy, Gorilla Girl, Sunstreak, Batwing, and Boulder. Less enthusiastic than the first recruits, most of them with criminal records, they are there as an alternative to prison. Taskmaster quickly renames Boulder "Butterball" regarding his size. The recruits break out of the camp because of boredom and decide to go to the beach where they drink and skinny dip, since they would be recognized anywhere else. Sunstreak attempts to have relations with Butterball, who refuses and takes their ride and heads back to the camp but encounters Constrictor, Taskmaster, War Machine and Yellowjacket. He lies, claiming to have gone AWOL alone. Although the recruits plan to use this distraction to sneak back on base, they instead help defeat Firebrand, King Cobra, Mister Hyde, and Mauler, all of whom wanted revenge on the Taskmaster. Butterball washes out of the program when it is deemed he does not have the attitude to be a superhero. To ease his disappointment, Taskmaster and Constrictor allow him to take a picture that makes it look like he has defeated them.

=== Secret Invasion ===
The Revolutionary, a member of Pennsylvania's Liberteens, is actually a Skrull in disguise. He is part of a plot to put "a Skrull in every state" by infiltrating each superhero team of the Initiative. During the "Secret Invasion" storyline, Crusader discovers that camp director Yellowjacket is a Skrull impostor; he almost tells Trauma, but changes his mind. When 3-D Man arrives in Camp Hammond to announce to everyone assembled that the Initiative has been infiltrated by Skrulls, Crusader fears he will be exposed as a Skrull despite his good intentions. Crusader uses his ring to reverse the goggles' power so that they cause 3-D Man to see Crusader as human and all humans as Skrulls.

'Yellowjacket-Skrull' gives orders to Gauntlet to dispatch the cadets to help the Young Avengers fight the Skrulls, and Proton is killed during the battle. The Skrulls defeat the cadets and Young Avengers, but then Nick Fury arrives with his "commandos." During the fight against the Skrull army, Crusader (a Skrull who lives on Earth and an Initiative cadet) fights for Earth. After defeating a Skrull imposter looking like She-Thing, 3-D Man joins the Skrull Kill Krew and begins killing the Skrull imposters in the Initiative, including Yellowjacket impersonator Criti Noll. Crusader is uncovered to be a Skrull and disappears after being shot by 3-D Man.

=== Dark Reign ===
Following the aftermath of the Secret Invasion, the Fifty-State Initiative is shut down and the Thunderbolts Initiative is established when Norman Osborn takes over.

Those that had been replaced by Skrulls alongside Alicia Masters meet with Doc Samson at Camp Hammond as part of a support group. Delroy states he is leaving the Initiative and joining up with Ryder to hunt down any Skrulls still hiding out on Earth. Taskmaster confronts Mutant Zero and discovers that she is really Typhoid Mary. Gauntlet takes control as head of Camp Hammond because of his position as the highest-ranking officer left. Despite an offer by Gauntlet, Hank Pym leaves the camp because he "was never here".

Some of the latest recruits graduate and are assigned to different teams. Batwing joins the Shadow Initiative, Melee is assigned to additional training to become a Camp Hammond instructor for martial arts, Annex joins the Mavericks, and Red Nine joins the Cavalry. Geiger also graduated, but it was not mentioned where she was to be stationed. Camp Hammond instructor Stingray became the new leader of the Point Men (Hawaii). Because of their villainous past, Sunstreak and Prodigy remain under training at Camp Hammond. Since Gorilla Girl felt she was typical cannon fodder, she went home and was listed as a reserve member. Meanwhile, Baron von Blitzschlag encounters Ragnarok, who apparently kills him.

After Ragnarok knocks out Rage and Slapstick, Debrii has the Scarlet Spiders hack into Ragnarok. However, Ragnarok kills Michael the Scarlet Spider. Ragnarok is about to vanquish Blitzschlag with pure physical force when Blitzschlag dismisses the notion as futile. He states that while Ragnarok could easily kill everyone here and everyone in the world, he would not change the fact he is a clone. Unconvinced, Ragnarok is shown proof that such methods are possible when one of the Scarlet Spiders reveals he and his "brothers" are also clones. Ragnarok resolves it matters not whether he is or isn't a clone, but that his warrior's resolve is true. He flies off to presumably confront Thor and his fellow Asgardians.

Following Ragnarok's attack, Counter Force buries Michael Van Patrick's body and confesses to the world about Michael's death and the clones. This gives Norman Osborn the opportunity to shut down Camp Hammond.

Osborn reopens the Initiative training camp under the name Camp H.A.M.M.E.R. He transfers Gravity to the Great Lakes Avengers, with Prodigy taking his place as leader of the Heavy Hitters. He assigns the Force of Nature to Oregon, the U-Foes to North Carolina, Psionex to Maryland, and the Women Warriors to Delaware. Penance, brainwashed at Osborn's command, is sent to Camp H.A.M.M.E.R. to assist Taskmaster. Gauntlet and Tigra leave their posts at the Initiative and join with the New Warriors to form the Avengers Resistance against Osborn. Trauma is kept on as the Camp H.A.M.M.E.R. counselor, against his will with the promise that if he leaves, his mother will be killed, but if he stays, they will cure her insanity. It is later revealed that Trauma is actually the son of Nightmare, who corrupts his son's body and attacks the base. Most of the heroes are stunned by their fears, but Taskmaster revives the fallen Penance who has regained all his memories and no longer has any fears and regrets. Immune to Nightmare, he frees Trauma and Nightmare is banished.

After Osborn's treachery is exposed, the Superhuman Registration Act is abolished. During the "Fear Itself" storyline, the Initiative teams reunite to discuss the hammers that the Serpent has brought to Earth.

== Characters ==
=== Camp Hammond staff ===
Name	First Shown	Notes
Henry Peter Gyrich	Avengers: The Initiative #1 (June 2007)	Administrator; Secretary of Superhuman Armed Forces. Forced to depart his position by Iron Man in Avengers: The Initiative #12.
Baron Von Blitzschlag	Avengers: The Initiative #1 (June 2007)	Head Scientist.
War Machine	Avengers: The Initiative #1 (June 2007)	Camp Director; Field Commander. Resigned his position in Avengers: The Initiative #16.
Yellowjacket	Avengers: The Initiative #1 (June 2007)	Chief Administrator. Revealed to be a Skrull impostor named Criti Noll who was later killed in Avengers: The Initiative #19.
Gauntlet	Avengers: The Initiative #1 (June 2007)	Drill Instructor. Became Camp Director in Avengers: The Initiative #20. Left to join the Avengers Resistance.
She-Hulk	Avengers: The Initiative #1 (June 2007)	Instructor. Removed from her instructor position and as a S.H.I.E.L.D. agent after a falling out with Tony Stark.
Justice	Avengers: The Initiative #1 (June 2007)	Youth Counselor. Left to lead Counter Force.
Triathlon	Avengers: The Initiative #1 (June 2007)	Instructor-In-Training. Assigned to the Hawaii Initiative team Point Men, as the new 3-D Man. Left to work with the Skrull Kill Krew.
Tigra	Avengers: The Initiative #1 (June 2007)	Instructor. Assigned to the Arkansas Initiative team. Left to join the Avengers Resistance.
Nighthawk	Avengers: The Initiative #1 (June 2007)	Instructor. Assigned to the New Jersey Initiative team, the Defenders.
Hellcat	Avengers: The Initiative #3 (Aug. 2007)	Instructor: First aid. Assigned to the Alaska Initiative team.
Black Widow	Avengers: The Initiative #3 (Aug. 2007)	Instructor: Marksmanship.
Stingray	Avengers: The Initiative #3 (Aug. 2007)	Instructor: Swimming. Assigned to the Hawaii Initiative team Point Men.
Thing	Avengers: The Initiative #3 (Aug. 2007)	Instructor: Tactics.
Beast	Avengers: The Initiative #3 (Aug. 2007)	Consultant.
Danielle Moonstar	Avengers: The Initiative #3 (Aug. 2007)	Consultant.
Taskmaster	Avengers: The Initiative #8 (Feb. 2008)	Drill instructor, and Shadow Initiative field leader. Originally replaced Gauntlet when he was in a coma.
Trauma	Avengers: The Initiative #12 (June 2008)	Counselor.
Physique	Avengers: The Initiative #12 (June 2008)	Infirmary department head.

Other guest instructors and staff included: Ares, Ms. Marvel, and Wonder Man as part of the Mighty Avengers. Batroc the Leaper previously worked out of the Virginia training facility, and was set to be moved to Camp Hammond as a Martial arts instructor. He later returned to his life of crime as a mercenary. Gargoyle served as an Initiative instructor before retiring.

=== Camp Hammond recruits ===
There were an undetermined number of recruits at Camp Hammond before it closed; according to Henry Peter Gyrich and War Machine, there are over sixty super humans at Camp Hammond including staff. Recruits shown to be located at the camp include:

Name	First Shown	Notes
Cloud 9	Avengers: The Initiative #1 (June 2007)	Assigned to the Montana Initiative team, Freedom Force.
Hardball	Avengers: The Initiative #1 (June 2007)	Assigned to the Nevada Initiative team, the Heavy Hitters. Left to join Hydra. Subsequently rejoined
Komodo	Avengers: The Initiative #1 (June 2007)	Assigned to the Arizona Initiative team, the Desert Stars. Joined the Shadow Initiative in Avengers: The Initiative #20.
Trauma	Avengers: The Initiative #1 (June 2007)	Became a counselor following graduation.
Armory	Avengers: The Initiative #1 (June 2007)	Her Tactigon was confiscated and she was sent out of the Initiative after accidentally killing Michael Van Patrick.
MVP (Michael Van Patrick)	Avengers: The Initiative #1 (June 2007)	Accidentally killed by Armory.
Thor Girl	Avengers: The Initiative #1 (June 2007)	Assigned to the Georgia Initiative team. Revealed to be a Skrull impostor.
Bengal	Avengers: The Initiative #1 (June 2007)	Assigned to the Shadow Initiative.
Ultra Girl	Avengers: The Initiative #1 (June 2007)	Director of the Junior Guardsmen. Left to join Counter Force. Returned and assigned to the Georgia Initiative team. Rejoined the New Warriors in Avengers: The Initiative #23.
Rage	Avengers: The Initiative #1 (June 2007)	Left to join Counter Force.
Slapstick	Avengers: The Initiative #1 (June 2007)	Left to join Counter Force.
Debrii	Avengers: The Initiative #6 (Nov. 2007)	Left to join Counter Force.
Ant-Man	Avengers: The Initiative #8 (Feb. 2008)	Assigned to the Thunderbolts.
Crusader	Avengers: The Initiative #8 (Feb. 2008)	Revealed to be a Skrull, and shot through the head by 3-D Man.
Dragon Lord	Avengers: The Initiative #8 (Feb. 2008)	Killed by KIA.
Proton (Geldoff)	Avengers: The Initiative #8 (Feb. 2008)	Killed by Skrulls after being taken prisoner.
Geiger	Avengers: The Initiative #8 (Feb. 2008)	Assigned to the New Mexico Initiative team.
Red Nine	Avengers: The Initiative #8 (Feb. 2008)	Assigned to the Georgia Initiative team.
Melee	Avengers: The Initiative #8 (Feb. 2008)	Trained to be an instructor following graduation.
Diamondback	Avengers: The Initiative #8 (Feb. 2008)	Recruited by Norman Osborn after the closing of Camp Hammond.
Prodigy	Avengers: The Initiative #13 (July 2008)	Assigned to the Nevada Initiative team, the Heavy Hitters by Norman Osborn.
Sunstreak	Avengers: The Initiative #13 (July 2008)	Assigned to the Oregon Initiative team, The Force of Nature by Norman Osborn.
Annex	Avengers: The Initiative #13 (July 2008)	Assigned to the New Mexico Initiative team.
Batwing	Avengers: The Initiative #13 (July 2008)	Assigned to the Shadow Initiative.
Gorilla Girl	Avengers: The Initiative #13 (July 2008)	Left in Avengers: The Initiative #21.
Butterball	Avengers: The Initiative #13 (July 2008)	Not being cut out for the military applications of The Initiative, was sent home with a registration ID card.

=== Other Initiative trainees ===
- Stature:
- Rocket Racer:
- Alex Power:
- Puma: Left to continue activity as a villain
- Challenger: Assigned to the Montana Initiative team, Freedom Force.
- Think Tank: Assigned to the Montana Initiative team, Freedom Force.
- Equinox: Assigned to the Montana Initiative team, Freedom Force. Revealed to be a Skrull infiltrator, and was killed by Cloud 9.
- Spinner: Assigned to the Montana Initiative team, Freedom Force. Believed killed trying to destroy a Skrull weapon system. Revealed to be alive in Fear Itself.
- Shooting Star: Assigned to the Texas Initiative team, the Rangers.
- Blazing Skull: Assigned to the New Jersey Initiative team, the Defenders.
- Nonstop: Assigned to the Nevada Initiative team, the Heavy Hitters.
- Telemetry: Assigned to the Nevada Initiative team, the Heavy Hitters.
- Gravity: Assigned to the Nevada Initiative team, the Heavy Hitters. Transferred to the Great Lakes Initiative by Norman Osborn.
- Earth A Hulkling: Falsely joined The Initiative using his Earth-616 counterpart's identity, since returned home.
- Earth A Wiccan: Falsely joined The Initiative using his Earth-616 counterpart's identity, since returned home.

=== Camp H.A.M.M.E.R. staff ===
Name	First Shown	Notes
Norman Osborn	Avengers: The Initiative #23	Chief Administrator; Instructor: Public Relations.
Taskmaster	Avengers: The Initiative #24	Camp Director; Senior Instructor.
The Hood	Avengers: The Initiative #25	Chief Operating Officer.
Trauma	Avengers: The Initiative #25	Counselor.

Other staff included Ares and Ms. Marvel (Moonstone) as part of the Dark Avengers. Baron Von Blitzschlag and Physique also retained the positions they had at Camp Hammond under Osborn's administration.

=== Camp H.A.M.M.E.R. recruits ===
Recruits shown to be part of Norman Osborn's Initiative include:

Name	First Shown	Notes
Griffin	Avengers: The Initiative #25 (Aug. 2009)	
Living Laser	Avengers: The Initiative #25 (Aug. 2009)	
Razor Fist	Avengers: The Initiative #25 (Aug. 2009)	
Scorcher	Avengers: The Initiative #25 (Aug. 2009)	
Penance	Avengers: The Initiative #25 (Aug. 2009)	Former member of Norman Osborn's Thunderbolts.
Diamondback	Avengers: The Initiative #25 (Aug. 2009)	Assigned to the Delaware initiative team. Double agent with the Avengers Resistance.
Aqueduct	Avengers: The Initiative #26 (Sept. 2009)	Assigned to the Oregon Initiative team.
Skybreaker	Avengers: The Initiative #26 (Sept. 2009)	Assigned to the Oregon Initiative team.
Terraformer	Avengers: The Initiative #26 (Sept. 2009)	Assigned to the Oregon Initiative team.
Ironclad	Avengers: The Initiative #26 (Sept. 2009)	Assigned to the North Carolina Initiative team.
Vapor	Avengers: The Initiative #26 (Sept. 2009)	Assigned to the North Carolina Initiative team.
Vector	Avengers: The Initiative #26 (Sept. 2009)	Assigned to the North Carolina Initiative team.
X-Ray	Avengers: The Initiative #26 (Sept. 2009)	Assigned to the North Carolina Initiative team.
Asylum	Avengers: The Initiative #26 (Sept. 2009)	Assigned to the Maryland Initiative team.
Coronary	Avengers: The Initiative #26 (Sept. 2009)	Assigned to the Maryland Initiative team.
Impulse	Avengers: The Initiative #26 (Sept. 2009)	Assigned to the Maryland Initiative team.
Mathemanic	Avengers: The Initiative #26 (Sept. 2009)	Assigned to the Maryland Initiative team.
Pretty Persuasions	Avengers: The Initiative #26 (Sept. 2009)	Assigned to the Maryland Initiative team.
Asp	Avengers: The Initiative #26 (Sept. 2009)	Assigned to the Delaware initiative team.
Black Mamba	Avengers: The Initiative #26 (Sept. 2009)	Assigned to the Delaware initiative team.
Quicksand	Avengers: The Initiative #26 (Sept. 2009)	Assigned to the Delaware initiative team.
Skein	Avengers: The Initiative #26 (Sept. 2009)	Assigned to the Delaware initiative team.
Outback	Avengers: The Initiative #28 (Nov. 2009)	Assigned to the Nevada Initiative team, the Heavy Hitters.

=== Other Camp H.A.M.M.E.R. trainees ===
- Percy Grimes
- Barton Grimes
- Cutthroat
- Mandrill
- Vampiro: Joined the Initiative to get out of prison. Killed by The Hood.
- Man-Killer

=== Avengers Resistance ===
After Camp Hammond was shut down, Tigra and Gauntlet joined the New Warriors who had left the Initiative, and formed the Avengers Resistance, with the specific purpose of exposing the criminal deeds of Norman Osborn. Following Norman Osborn's arrest in the aftermath of the Siege of Asgard, the team disbanded.

Character	Joined in	Notes
Justice	Avengers: The Initiative #10 (Apr. 2008)	
Night Thrasher	Avengers: The Initiative #10 (Apr. 2008)	
Rage	Avengers: The Initiative #10 (Apr. 2008)	
Scarlet Spider (Michael)	Avengers: The Initiative #10 (Apr. 2008)	Killed by Ragnarok.
Scarlet Spider (Patrick)	Avengers: The Initiative #10 (Apr. 2008)	
Slapstick	Avengers: The Initiative #10 (Apr. 2008)	
Ultra Girl	Avengers: The Initiative #10 (Apr. 2008)	
Debrii	Avengers: The Initiative #10 (Apr. 2008)	Quit the team in Avengers: The Initiative #28.
Tigra	Avengers: The Initiative #25 (Aug. 2009)	
Gauntlet	Avengers: The Initiative #25 (Aug. 2009)	
Komodo	Avengers: The Initiative #29 (Dec. 2009)	Joined after having her powers removed by Taskmaster.
Diamondback	Avengers: The Initiative #30 (Jan. 2010)	Double agent with Norman Osborn's Initiative.

=== List of teams by state ===
State	Team Name	1st Appearance	Members
Alaska	Unnamed	Patsy Walker: Hellcat #1	Hellcat
Arizona	Desert Stars	Avengers: The Initiative #16	Two-Gun Kid (leader), Komodo, Johnny Cool, Supermax, Blacksmith (secretly a Skrull infiltrator)
Arkansas	Battalion	Avengers: The Initiative #19	Tigra, Razorback (was briefly replaced by a Skrull infiltrator)
California	The Order	Civil War #6	Member List
Colorado	Thunderbolts	Thunderbolts #110 (as Initiative team)	Member List
Connecticut	Camp Hammond Staff & Trainees	Avengers: The Initiative #1	Various
Delaware	The Women Warriors	Avengers: The Initiative #26	Asp, Black Mamba, Diamondback, Quicksand, Skein
Florida	The Command	Marvel Zombies vol. 3 #1	Jennifer Kale, Wundarr the Aquarian, Siege, Conquistador (was briefly replaced by a Skrull)
Georgia	Cavalry	Avengers: The Initiative #18	Stunt-Master, Crime-Buster, Red Nine, Thor Girl, Ultra Girl
Hawaii	Point Men	Avengers: The Initiative #14	Stingray, Devil-Slayer, Star Sign, Paydirt, Magnitude (revealed to be a Skrull infiltrator), Delroy Garrett (former)
Illinois	Spaceknights	Named in Civil War #6	Unknown
Iowa	Force Works	Named in Civil War #6	Cybermancer
Kansas	Harvesters	Marvel Zombies Supreme #2	Pioneer, Grain Belt, Topeka, Meadowlark, Sunflower
Kentucky	Action Pack	Avengers: The Initiative #7	Vox (leader), Prima Donna, Frog-Man (briefly replaced by a Skrull)
Maryland	Psionex	Avengers: The Initiative #26	Member List
Montana	Freedom Force	Avengers: The Initiative #12	Member List
Nebraska	Unnamed group	The Invincible Iron Man vol. 4 #24	Captain Ultra (Leader), Gadget (Deceased), Paragon (Cooper Roth) (Deceased)
Nevada	Heavy Hitters	Avengers: The Initiative #17	Hardball, Prodigy, Gravity, Nonstop, Telemetry, Outback
New Jersey	Defenders	The Last Defenders #1	Member List
New Mexico	The Mavericks	Avengers: The Initiative #16	Annex, Geiger, Jocasta, She-Thing (was revealed to be a Skrull infiltrator)
New York	Avengers (Initiative)	The Mighty Avengers #1	Member List
North Carolina	Unnamed group (formerly the U-Foes)	Avengers: The Initiative #35	Batwing, Butterball
Ohio	Agents from A.R.M.O.R.	Marvel Zombies 5 #2	Howard the Duck, Machine Man, Swift Cloud, Hurricane
Oregon	Force of Nature	Avengers: The Initiative #26	
Pennsylvania	The Liberteens	Avengers: The Initiative Annual #1	Member List
Texas	Rangers	Civil War #7 (as Initiative team)	Member List
Utah	The Called	Civil War #6	Unnamed Mormon superheroes.
Vermont	The Garrison	Penance Relentless #3	Fin, Man-Eater
Washington	Earth Force	Civil War: Front Line #12 (as Initiative team)	Earth Lord, Skyhawk, Wind Warrior
Wisconsin	Great Lakes Initiative	Deadpool/GLI Summer Fun Spectacular (as Initiative team)	Member List

== Details ==
- Cadets are trained in combat, search and rescue, power control, first aid, and superhuman ethics.
- The training that Initiative cadets undergo is structured like basic recruit training.
- Cadets are issued uniforms comprising palm gloves, traction boots and military fatigue cargo pants. A t-shirt with some kind of logo (often with the first letter of the cadet's codename) on it is provided if the cadet does not already have a costume. If the cadet has a secret identity, they are required to conceal it.
- While the "Avengers Assemble!" battle cry is used by instructors and cadets in battle and many instructors and cadets are former or current members, being a recruit does not automatically award one membership in the Avengers. Use of the Avengers name is informal and meant to act as an inspirational tool.

== Collected editions ==
Title	Material collected	Publication date	ISBN
Avengers: The Initiative Vol. 1: Basic Training	Avengers: The Initiative #1-6	March 26, 2008	978-0785125167
Avengers: The Initiative Vol. 2: Killed In Action	Avengers: The Initiative #7-13 and Annual #1	November 19, 2009	978-0785128618
Avengers: The Initiative, Vol. 3: Secret Invasion	Avengers: The Initiative #14-19	May 27, 2009	978-0785131670
Avengers: The Initiative, Vol. 4: Disassembled	Avengers: The Initiative #20-25, and Avengers: The Initiative Featuring Reptil	December 9, 2009	978-0785131687
Avengers: The Initiative - Dreams & Nightmares	Avengers: The Initiative #26-30	October 6, 2010	978-0785139058
Siege: Avengers - The Initiative	Avengers: The Initiative #31-35 and Avengers: The Initiative Special	December 15, 2010	978-0785148180
Avengers: The Initiative - The Complete Collection Vol. 1	Avengers: The Initiative #1-19 and Annual #1	March 28, 2017	978-1302904111
Avengers: The Initiative - The Complete Collection Vol. 2	Avengers: The Initiative #20-35; Avengers: The Initiative Special; Avengers: The Initiative Featuring Reptil	August 29, 2017	978-1302906870

== See also ==
- Omega Flight
