= Baron Von Blitzschlag =

- Baron Von Blitzschlag as depicted in Avengers: The Initiative #2 (June 2007). Art by Stefano Caselli.

Publication information
- Publisher: Marvel Comics
- First appearance: Avengers: The Initiative #1 (April 2007)
- Created by: Dan Slott (writer); Stefano Caselli (artist)

In-story information
- Alter ego: Werner Von Blitzschlag
- Species: Human mutate
- Team affiliations: Commission on Superhuman Activities; Avengers: The Initiative; Nazi Party
- Notable aliases: Doc
- Abilities: Genius-level intellect; Electric manipulation granting: Ability to turn into a sentient electrical form; Ability to enhance physical traits; Electrical absorption

Baron Werner Von Blitzschlag is a character appearing in American comic books published by Marvel Comics. Werner Von Blitzschlag holds the title of German-language title of "Freiherr" corresponding to "Baron" in English. His last name is German for "Lightning-Strike."

== Development ==
=== Concept and creation ===
Character creator Dan Slott describes Baron Von Blitzschlag as, "A Nazi supervillain that you've never seen. He's someone who had off panel run-ins with [1940s era] guys like the Whizzer, Miss America, and Thin Man. But no one really remembers him. The way he works in this book is that he's one of the guys in Hank Pym's lab in the Initiative. You read stuff like 'Civil War' and you see that they're making heroes like the new Champions. And that's one of the places he comes in. The Baron is a Nazi geneticist who is helping out the Initiative in the same way Wernher von Braun was helping out the NASA space program. As much as we hate the Nazis and they were awful human beings, we used guys who worked on the V-2 rockets to help us put men on the moon and the Russians were using them too. There's something like that going on in the Initiative but I can't say any more about it."

Originally, Baron Von Blitzschlag's role was going to be filled by pre-existing character Arnim Zola. This plan was changed due to Ed Brubaker's plans for Zola in Captain America, with Von Blitzschlag being created to fill Zola's role.

=== Publication history ===
Baron Von Blitzschlag was created by writer Dan Slott and artist Stefano Caselli, the character first appeared in Avengers: The Initiative #1 (April 2007).

== Fictional character biography ==
During World War II, Baron Werner Von Blitzschlag was a Nazi supervillain who fought an assortment of Golden Age superheroes.

Following the conclusion to Civil War, Baron Von Blitzschlag is recruited into The Initiative and works at Camp Hammond, seemingly taking the position as the head of scientific research. He sits in on training sessions and is particularly interested in the development of Trauma's abilities.

Von Blitzschlag creates several clones of Michael Van Patrick, three of which become the Scarlet Spiders. Blitzschlag becomes emotionally attached to his three 'sons', and shows distress when two of them are killed in combat and the third one rejects him. Von Blitzschlag is later wounded by KIA, one of MVP's clones, leaving him unable to walk and reliant on a life-supporting apparatus powered by his bioelectricity. When Thor's clone Ragnarok reawakens, he seemingly kills Von Blitzschlag with his hammer. Instead, Ragnarok's electricity make Von Blitzschlag even more powerful and able to stand, as electricity "is his blood". Von Blitzschlag also appears when Star-Lord and the Guardians of the Galaxy brief Gauntlet and Mister Fantastic about the conquest of Negative Zone Prison Alpha.

When the Avengers Resistance invades Camp H.A.M.M.E.R., Hardball and Cloud 9 walk in on a depowered Komodo holding Baron Von Blitzschlag at gunpoint and stop her from shooting him. Von Blitzschlag surrenders and gives the heroes a flash-drive containing records of Norman Osborn's actions in exchange for leniency.

== Powers and abilities ==
Baron Werner Von Blitzschlag has genius-level intellect. He later possessed the power to manipulate electricity, allowing him to absorb electricity, use it to enhance his physical traits, and turn into a sentient electrical form.

== In other media ==
Baron von Blitzschlag appears in The Avengers: Earth's Mightiest Heroes, voiced by Steve Blum.
