= Batwing (Marvel Comics) =

Fictional character in Marvel Comics

- Cover for Untold Tales of Spider-Man #2 (October 1995), the first appearance of Batwing. Art by Pat Olliffe and Al Vey.

Publication information
- Publisher: Marvel Comics
- First appearance: Untold Tales of Spider-Man #2 (October 1995)
- Created by: Kurt Busiek; Pat Olliffe

In-story information
- Alter ego: James "Jimmy" Santini
- Species: Human mutate
- Team affiliations: The Initiative; Avengers Academy
- Abilities: Superhuman speed Flight via bat wings Enhanced hearing Echolocation; Night vision Sharp claws and fangs

James "Jimmy" Santini is a character appearing in American comic books published by Marvel Comics. Created by writer Kurt Busiek and artist Pat Olliffe, the character first appeared in Untold Tales of Spider-Man #2 (October 1995). Santini is known under the codename Batwing. He mutated into a bat-like creature after surviving an attack by polluters while investigating illegal waste dumping. Rejected by his mother and pursued under a bounty, he is aided by Peter Parker / Spider-Man and later joins the Initiative and the Avengers Academy.

== Publication history ==
James Santini debuted in Untold Tales of Spider-Man #2 (October 1995), created by Kurt Busiek and Pat Olliffe. He subsequently appeared in several Marvel series, including Thunderbolts (2006), Avengers: The Initiative (2007), and Avengers Academy (2010).

== Fictional character biography ==
Young Jimmy Santini joined his father in investigating illegal toxic waste dumping in Carlsbad Caverns National Park when his father was either shot in the back by the polluters or fell to his death in the deep caverns (the full details were murky in Jimmy's diary). Jimmy was lost in the caverns and drank toxic water, causing him to mutate into a bat-like creature. After arriving in New York City, Jimmy lives under an old pier and begins stealing food to survive.

When New York City Councilman Randolph Cherryh is dining with his girlfriend, Batwing appears and steals some of his apples, humiliating Cherryh. Cherryh places a bounty on Batwing, which Peter Parker decides to take part on during his financial problems. Cherryh arranges for a party as part of a trap. When Batwing arrives, the police begin shooting, only for Peter Parker in his alias of Spider-Man to web up the guns and pursue Batwing. Batwing battles Spider-Man before fleeing to where he lived under the pier. When Spider-Man follows Batwing to the pier, he discovers that Batwing is just a scared kid who was stealing food to survive. Spider-Man reads some of his history before Jimmy encounters Cherryh, who had secretly followed him in his helicopter. Cherryh is about to kill Batwing when Spider-Man webs down his men. Batwing flees despite Spider-Man's offer to get Reed Richards or Hank Pym to help cure him. Cherryh vows to ruin Spider-Man's life before having his mouth webbed and himself being shoved into a garbage can.

Spider-Man later asks Dr. Curt Connors to use his expertise to help cure Jimmy. When an accident causes Connors to become the Lizard again, Batwing helps Spider-Man track him down and cure Connors. Connors and Jimmy leave New York for someplace quiet where Jimmy can be cured.

When Connors' cure fails, Batwing returns to New York and battles Spider-Man again. With his father dead and his mother rejecting him, Jimmy hopes for death. Spider-Man locates Jimmy's mother and tells her that Jimmy is still her son, regardless of his condition, and that she was wrong to reject him. As Batwing is about to be shot by the New York Police Department, Jimmy's mother intervenes and tells her son that she still loves him. Upon hearing this and knowing that he is loved, Jimmy reverts to his human form, and the police retreat. Jimmy goes home with his mother, finally receiving the love that he needs.

After the superhero Civil War, Batwing enters the Fifty State Initiative as one of the recruits at Camp Hammond along with Gorilla Girl, Prodigy, Butterball and others. He joins them so that they can help cure him of his bat form.

Batwing is later assigned to the Shadow Initiative. While the rest of the Initiative is busy with the Siege of Asgard, Penance evades the guards and convinces Batwing, Bengal, and Butterball into helping the Avengers Resistance. Batwing and Butterball later organize a new superteam for North Carolina, based in Morganton, to replace the incarcerated U-Foes.

During the Fear Itself storyline, Batwing appears at a meeting held by Prodigy regarding magical hammers that have crashed into the earth. He aids the team in rescuing survivors and appears during the battle against Thor Girl, who has regained her powers.

Batwing is part of the new class of students when the Avengers Academy moves to the former headquarters of the West Coast Avengers.

== Powers and abilities ==
James Santini possesses bat-like wings that enable high-speed flight and agility, along with sharp claws and teeth, enhanced hearing, night vision, and the ability to emit high-frequency sounds for echolocation. His elongated fingers support his wings for greater control, and he is lightly covered in patches of fur.
