= Bengal (character) =

Duc No Tranh Bengal
- Duc No Tranh / Bengal. Art by Jim Cheung.

Publication information
- Publisher: Marvel Comics
- First appearance: Daredevil #258 (September 1988)
- Created by: Fabian Nicieza; Ron Lim

In-story information
- Alter ego: Duc No Tranh
- Species: Human
- Team affiliations: Shadow Initiative; The Initiative
- Notable aliases: Bengal
- Abilities: Skilled archer and tracker; Enhanced sense of smell; Master martial artist; Exceptional athlete; Excellent acrobat

Bengal (Duc No Tranh) is a character appearing in American comic books published by Marvel Comics. Created by writer Fabian Nicieza and artist Ron Lim, the character first appeared in Daredevil #258 (September 1988). Originally introduced as a villain driven by revenge for the destruction of his village during the Vietnam War, Bengal later became part of a secretive shadow operation within the Initiative, following orders without question. However, during the Siege event, his moral code prevailed, leading him to side with the Avengers.

== Publication history ==
Bengal first appeared in Daredevil #258, and was created by Fabian Nicieza and Ron Lim.

== Fictional character biography ==
Duc No Tranh was a boy growing up in a Vietnamese village at the time of the Vietnam War. During the war, American soldiers, including William Talltrees, Willie Lincoln, and the future Reverend Michael Janes, massacre his village and parents. The boy tries to climb aboard the Americans' helicopter, but is kicked off by Janes despite the pleas of the other soldiers on board. Years later, the boy becomes the costumed Bengal and travels to America for revenge on the soldiers involved in the destruction of his village. Willie Lincoln seeks the protection of Daredevil, who defeats Bengal.

Bengal later attacks Janes and battles Silhouette and the New Warriors. After Punisher stops him, Bengal befriends the New Warriors and makes peace with Janes.

Bengal still feels the need to avenge atrocities stemming from the Vietnam War. He comes to believe that Gai No Don, an acquaintance of Night Thrasher, is Li Pan, a Vietnamese general responsible for thousands of innocent deaths. Bengal battles security officers until he reaches Gai. He is confronted by Night Thrasher and Silhouette, whom Gai has hired. He is told Gai is not Li Pan. Bengal leaps out a window and escapes. Bengal later attacks the Poison Memories gang, a long time New Warriors enemy. He believes they have information on Li Pan. Again, Night Thrasher fights him. He is temporarily subdued and urged to move on.

Following the "Civil War" storyline, Bengal appears as a member of the 50 States Initiative, training at Camp Hammond. Bengal is the leader of the Initiative's black-ops team created by Henry Peter Gyrich. Soon after, the Hulk returns from deep space with an army and battles many of Earth's heroes. Some of the Camp Hammond recruits are captured and kept imprisoned in Madison Square Garden. Bengal, Constrictor, Mutant Zero, and other operatives free the Hammond prisoners.

During the Secret Invasion storyline, Bengal discovers that Skrull forces have taken over Camp Hammond. At first, he makes sure that children and staff at the Camp Hammond daycare are placed safely in a bomb shelter. He then summons the rest of the Shadow Initiative to deal with them. They find and recruit Ant-Man and decide to assassinate Queen Veranke, but the attempt fails and they are taken captive. They are freed after the invasion force is destroyed.

During the "Siege" storyline, Penance convinces Batwing, Bengal, and Butterball to help the Avengers Resistance. After Norman Osborn is defeated, Bengal moves to Brooklyn and opens a martial arts gym.

Bengal is later revealed to have a son named Tigriss, who participates in the Challenge of the Jade Dragon tournament and battles Spider-Boy.

== Powers and abilities ==
Bengal is a highly skilled martial artist and hand-to-hand combatant, proficient in various fighting styles. He is especially adept at wielding the sai, initially using a modified version with spring-loaded outer blades. In addition to his expertise in close combat, he utilizes shuriken and demonstrated skill in archery, often using arrows to create zip lines for traversal. He is highly resourceful, observant, and skilled at gathering information. His physical attributes—including strength, speed, stamina, durability, agility, and reflexes—are at peak athletic levels.

== In other media ==
Bengal appears as a playable character in Lego Marvel's Avengers.
