= Dragon Lord (character) =

Dragon Lord is the name of several unrelated fictional characters appearing in American comic books published by Marvel Comics.

== Publication history ==
The first Dragon Lord appeared in Sub-Mariner #52-54 (August–October 1972), and was created by Bill Everett (artist)
Mike Friedrich (writer).

The Dragon Lord Yu-Ti first appeared in Marvel Premiere #15 (May 1974), and was created by Roy Thomas and Gil Kane. The character subsequently appears in Deadly Hands of Kung Fu #10 (March 1975), Marvel Premiere #22 (June 1975), Master of Kung Fu Annual #1 (1976), Deadly Hands of Kung Fu #21 (February 1976), Iron Fist #6-7 (August–September 1976), Marvel Team-Up #64 (December 1977), Power Man and Iron Fist #74-75 (October–November 1981), and Immortal Iron Fist #4-8 (May–October 2007), and #10-14 (December 2007-June 2008).

Tako Shamara first appeared in Marvel Spotlight (vol. 2) #5 (March, 1980), and was created by Marv Wolfman and Steve Ditko. In his first appearance the character battled a huge dragon from the past called a Wani, a monster that destroyed his ancestors' villages in 1582. The creature that Tako battled was intended to be Godzilla but since Marvel no longer had the rights to the character (which had lapsed the previous year) the creature was modified to a dragon called The Wani.

Ral Dorn, the Dragon Lord, appeared in Fantastic Four Annual #16 (1981), and was created by Ed Hannigan and Steve Ditko.

== History ==
=== Dragon Lord ===
Dragon Lord

Publication information
- Publisher: Marvel Comics
- First appearance: Sub-Mariner #52 (August 1972)
- Created by: Bill Everett (writer); Mike Friedrich (artist)

The Dragon Lord was a fanatic bent on avenging Japan's defeat in World War II. Although blind, he appears to be able to "see" mentally. He used Sunfire as an ally, but Namor later convinced Sunfire of Dragon Lord's intentions to conquer the world for his own benefit. The two heroes stopped Dragon Lord's plans and destroyed his base.

=== Nu-An ===
Nu-An is the Yu-Ti (a name given to the rulers of K'un-Lun) who also uses the alias of Dragon Lord as did his father Lord Tuan.

=== Tako Shamara ===
Dragon Lord
- Tako Shamara makes his first appearance battling the dragon Wani. From Marvel Spotlight (vol. 2) #5

Publication information
- Publisher: Marvel Comics
- First appearance: Marvel Spotlight (vol. 2) #5 (March, 1980)
- Created by: Marv Wolfman (writer); Steve Ditko (artist)

In-story information
- Alter ego: Tako Shamara
- Abilities: Summon and control dragons through elixirs

In his first appearance the character battled a huge dragon from the past called a Wani, a monster that destroyed his ancestors' villages in 1582.

Dragon Lord later appears in Camp Hammond as an official recruit for the Initiative, only to be killed when K.I.A. attacks the group of new trainees. The surviving trainees, along with Triathlon and the Taskmaster, present his ashes and a flag to Shamara's family at their Long Island home. Shamara's son states that he intends to honor his father by taking up his mantle.

=== Ral Dorn ===
Dragon Lord

Publication information
- Publisher: Marvel Comics
- First appearance: Fantastic Four Annual #16 (1981)
- Created by: Ed Hannigan (writer); Steve Ditko (artist)

In-story information
- Alter ego: Ral Dorn

Ral Dorn was a human of Earthly parentage who leads the Dragon Riders of the extradimensional world of Rammatpolen. The Dragon Riders use dragons as mounts in their journeys through time and space. Ral Dorn has used the Dragon Man as his own mount.

Ed Hannigan spoke of the character's creation stating,

"Shooter wanted to keep the name Dragon Lord, but he wanted a new character that wasn't a kung fu character. He asked me to create one."

== Powers and abilities ==
Nu-An is shown to have some degree of minimal combat skills. He does not appear to age due to him eating a fruit from off the Tree of Immortality.

The Tako Shamara version of the Dragon Lord could summon dragons and control them through elixirs created in his cauldron. He was mocked by Taskmaster for this flaw, who felt that such an ability would not be useful in combat due to its time-consuming nature.
