= James Santini =

James Santini may refer to:

- Batwing (Marvel Comics), Marvel character
- James David Santini, American politician
