= Rage (Marvel Comics) =

Marvel Comics character

- Rage. Art by Paco Medina.

Publication information
- Publisher: Marvel Comics
- First appearance: The Avengers #326 (November 1990)
- Created by: Larry Hama (writer); Paul Ryan (artist)

In-story information
- Alter ego: Elvin Daryl Haliday
- Species: Human
- Team affiliations: Counter Force; The Initiative; New Warriors; Avengers; Psionex
- Notable aliases: The O.G.
- Abilities: Skilled street fighter Superhuman strength, speed, stamina, durability and resistance to injury Ability to leap great distances

Rage (Elvin Haliday) is a fictional character appearing in American comic books published by Marvel Comics. He has been a member of the Avengers and the New Warriors, and appeared in the pages of The Avengers, New Warriors, Night Thrasher, and Avengers: The Initiative. In the second volume of Night Thrasher, Haliday was reintroduced as The O.G., the leader of a small gang.

== Creation ==
Rage's co-creator Larry Hama described the character's creation in a 2012 interview with Comic Book Resources. Rage being a teenager with a superpowered adult appearance was inspired by DC Comics' Captain Marvel, while his grandmother Edna was inspired by Spider-Man's Aunt May. Hama did not intend to make Rage African-American, but realized that the ethnicity fit his character and changed other aspects of Rage to make him work.

== Publication history ==
Elvin Haliday was created by Larry Hama and Paul Ryan and first appeared as Rage in The Avengers #326 (November 1990). In the series Night Thrasher (2024), Haliday assumes the identity of The O.G.

== Fictional character biography ==
Elvin Haliday was born in Brooklyn, New York. At age 13, he is exposed to toxic waste while hiding from bullies, which accelerates his growth and gives him superhuman physical abilities. Encouraged by his grandmother to use his newfound abilities for good, Elvin adopts a costume and the name Rage.

Soon after his transformation, Rage confronts the Avengers, demanding to be made a member. He scolds Captain America for the team's lack of black members. Rage leaves after a brief scuffle, but assists the Avengers in their next mission against L.D.50. Alongside the Avengers, he battles other-dimensional alien prisoners.

After racial tensions escalate due to the machinations of the Hate-Monger, Rage and the New Warriors battle the Sons of the Serpent. Captain America is ultimately able to calm the situation and forces the Hate-Monger to retreat. During the battle, the other Avengers learn that Rage is a teenager. Captain America ousts Rage from the main team, but allows him to remain as a trainee.

=== New Warriors ===
Rage helps the New Warriors and Darkhawk steal one of the Avengers' Quinjets for a mission to Cambodia to battle the Folding Circle. Soon afterward, he joins the New Warriors as a full member and is given a new costume.

During his time with the New Warriors, Rage's grandmother Edna Staples is killed by a street gang called the Poison Memories, bent on revenge against the team, leaving him an orphan. He dons a new costume, including a metal helmet. Andrew Chord, the legal guardian of his teammate Night Thrasher, becomes Rage's legal guardian as well. Rage is accused of murdering Kimeiko Ashu, the leader of the Poison Memories. He is ultimately cleared of all charges with the assistance of Night Thrasher.

After the New Warriors disband, Rage is offered to join a new version of the group, but refuses in favor of attending boarding school.

Soon after Nitro devastates Stamford, Connecticut, Rage and former teammate Justice learn that the former members of the New Warriors are being publicly hunted down. The two discover that former New Warriors member Carlton LaFroyge (Hindsight Lad), enraged at the events in Stamford, had publicly outed the identities of the New Warriors. Rage and Justice decide to side with Captain America during the Civil War and oppose the proposed Superhuman Registration Act.

=== The Initiative ===
Sometime later, Rage is seen on board a bus of new recruits arriving at Camp Hammond. During his time in the Initiative program, Rage is subjected to constant verbal abuse by Gauntlet regarding the New Warriors. After Gauntlet is found beaten nearly to death with a New Warriors symbol scrawled across his chest in his own blood, all former New Warriors members and associates on base are detained for questioning. During the investigation, Rage reveals that he had an altercation with Gauntlet the day before the assault and that Gauntlet was about to recommend removing him from the Initiative and nullifying his powers until he turns 18.

During the Dark Reign storyline, Rage quits the Initiative along with other New Warriors-associated cadets (Justice, Debrii, Slapstick, and the Scarlet Spiders) to form Counter Force. He later returns to Camp Hammond with the team, now calling themselves the New Warriors again.

In Captain America: Sam Wilson, Rage goes to Empire State University with Falcon (Joaquin Torres) to confront an anti-immigrant politician who is giving a speech at campus. They later face the Bombshells, a trio of armored protesters, and defeat them. While returning home, Rage encounters Man Mountain Marko and Speed Demon, who are robbing a pawn shop. After a brief fight, the villains escape and Rage is arrested by the Americops. When Captain America (Sam Wilson) offers him help, Rage turns it down, preferring to prove his innocence himself. Sam does so by releasing footage of the Americops beating Rage. Judge David Roderick deems the footage inadmissible and has Rage convicted. To get better proof of Rage's innocence, Sam captures Speed Demon, who confesses to his and Marko's robbery of the pawn shop. Rage is beaten by prisoners and sustains severe brain damage, with Claire Temple stating that he will not survive. In the Venomized storyline, Rage recovers and helps evacuate Manhattan during the Hive's invasion of Earth.

In the second volume of Night Thrasher, Rage assumes the identity of The O.G. and becomes the leader of a small gang. He is imprisoned in the Raft, but Night Thrasher and Silhouette break into the prison to free him, reasoning that Rage is only doing what he thinks is right. The O.G.'s gang members are later taken in and employed as local market workers, while The O.G. is sentenced to 10,000 hours of community service under Night Thrasher's supervision.

== Powers and abilities ==
Elvin's exposure to unknown biochemical radioactive wastes gave him superhuman strength, speed, stamina, durability and resistance to physical injury. Rage possesses basic street-fighting skills, and has received some combat training from Captain America and Night Thrasher.

Rage usually wears a costume of synthetic fabric and body armor, and formerly wore a helmet of unspecified material, all of which he designed for himself.

== Other versions ==
An alternate universe version of Rage appears in House of M as a member of the Wolfpack.

== In other media ==
Rage makes a non-speaking cameo appearance in the Fantastic Four episode "To Battle the Living Planet".

== Reception ==
Newsarama ranked Rage as the seventh worst Avengers member, describing him as having been "created at a time when the formula for creating Avengers was Name > Costume > Concept > Usefulness > Relevance, and the formula for creating black superheroes was Teenager > Drugs > Skateboard > Urban > Character Development".
