= Gravity (character) =

Greg Willis Gravity
- Gravity as depicted in Fear Itself: Youth in Revolt #4 (August 2011). Art by Giuseppe Camuncoli.

Publication information
- Publisher: Marvel Comics
- First appearance: Gravity #1 (August 2005)
- Created by: Sean McKeever (writer); Mike Norton (artist)

In-story information
- Alter ego: Gregory "Greg" Willis
- Species: Human mutate
- Team affiliations: Great Lakes Avengers; Young Avengers; Heavy Hitters; New Warriors
- Notable aliases: Protector of the Universe; Gravity
- Abilities: Gravity manipulation

Greg Willis is a superhero appearing in American comic books published by Marvel Comics. Created by writer Sean McKeever and artist Mike Norton, the character first appeared in Gravity #1 (August 2005). Willis is known under the codename Gravity. The character has been a member of the Young Allies, the Fifty State Initiative, and the Great Lakes Avengers at various points in his history.

== Development ==
=== Concept and creation ===
Sean McKeever and Mike Norton wanted to create their own character inspired by the college-aged Spider-Man from the 1980s they grew up with. They described the character as a modern take on the classic superhero struggles, inspired by McKeever's own Midwestern background and the balance of action and everyday life found in the 1980s Amazing Spider-Man. Gravity's journey as a rookie hero, learning from mistakes and trying to navigate both crime-fighting and personal challenges, was central to his story, with Norton emphasizing his inexperience despite great power. The character resonated with readers, earning comparisons to Spider-Man, and both creators continue to receive fan appreciation. They expressed a desire to explore Gravity's origin story and hope to return to the character someday. Additionally, McKeever recalled how Dwayne McDuffie, who included Gravity in Beyond!, later revived him in Fantastic Four, which deeply moved both McKeever and Norton.

Marvel Comics had considered making Greg Willis the new Captain Marvel at one point. After Gravity's death in the Beyond miniseries, McKeever was tapped to write a Captain Marvel series starring Willis as the titular hero, resurrected during the events of Civil War. However, these plans were eventually scrapped, and Gravity was revived in Fantastic Four instead. McKeever expressed uncertainty about why the Captain Marvel series was canceled, but noted that Gravity's intended return as Captain Marvel never came to fruition. The role of Captain Marvel eventually went to Carol Danvers in 2012, years after the cancellation of these plans.

=== Publication history ===
==== 2000s ====
Greg Willis debuted in Gravity #1 (August 2005), created by Sean McKeever and Mike Norton. His first appearance was in his own limited series: Gravity #1-5 (2005), later released as a digest-formatted graphic novel as part of the Marvel Next imprint aimed at younger readers. In the same year, Gravity was featured in Marvel Holiday Special (2005) in a minor role. The character's next appearance was in the crossover storyline Beyond! #1-6 (2006) which was followed up by related appearances in Fantastic Four #545-546 and #550 (2007) and Black Panther vol. 4 #27 (2007). Gravity then had minor appearances in Fantastic Four #556 (2008), Avengers: The Initiative #17-19 (2008–2009), Avengers: The Initiative Special #1 (2009), Fantastic Four #563 (2009), Avengers: The Initiative #25 (2009) and Avengers Academy #13 (2011).

==== 2010s ====
A solo storyline in Age of Heroes #2 (2010) provided the prologue to Gravity's next appearance as a member of the Young Allies in Young Allies #1-6 (2010–2011) then later in Onslaught Unleashed #1-4 (2011). Gravity was prominently featured in the "Fear Itself" tie-in series Youth in Revolt (2011).

== Fictional character biography ==
Greg Willis was born and raised in Sheboygan, Wisconsin. During the summer after his high school graduation, while on board his family's yacht, Greg is sucked into a mysterious black hole and gains the ability to manipulate gravity. Looking to take advantage of his new powers, Greg moves east to New York City to study licensing and merchandising at New York University, and becomes a marketable superhero known as Gravity.

The villain Black Death takes a special interest in Gravity, disguising himself as the hero Greenwich Guardian to further break his confidence and use him in a plot to destroy the university. After stopping Black Death, Gravity is congratulated by Spider-Man, filling him with confidence. Finally feeling accepted, Gravity begins a relationship with his friend Lauren and continues his superhero career. Gravity later revealed his double identity to Lauren.

=== Beyond ===
After defeating a villain called Brushfire, Gravity stumbles upon a mysterious structure in Central Park and is transported to an alien world where he meets Spider-Man, Hank Pym, Wasp, Venom, Kraven, Firebird, and the Hood. A mysterious voice claiming to be the Beyonder explains to the gathered heroes and villains that they must slay their enemies to win their reward. During their attempts to survive the hostile alien world, the group meet Michael Collins, who helps them survive and come to the realization that the Beyonder has seemingly brought them together to evaluate them and see who wins in a battle amongst themselves. Eventually, the group battles one another, and Pym emerges as the victor when he seemingly kills the other heroes and villains. He then deceives the Beyonder into revealing his true identity as the Stranger, and restores the rest of the group, who have been shrunk down using Pym Particles. An angered Stranger is about to destroy the group until Uatu appears. The presence of a Watcher unnerves the Stranger, who then allows the group to leave peacefully, and disappears. Without the Stranger's power, the planet begins to pull itself apart. Gravity uses his powers to hold the planet together and allows the rest of the group to escape. He uses the last of his power to join the group on the spaceship, but dies shortly afterwards.

=== Return and Initiative ===
When Gravity's grave is desecrated and his body is stolen, Michael Collins enlists the help of the new Fantastic Four (now consisting of Black Panther and Storm as well as the Human Torch and the Thing) to find his fallen comrade. Following a cosmic residue left behind at the graveyard, the team ventures into deep space to discover that Epoch has stolen Gravity's corpse and resurrected him to serve as the new Protector of the Universe. To protect Epoch from being consumed, Gravity empties his new cosmic-level powers into Galactus and returns to Earth to see his parents and Lauren once more. Later, when the Fantastic Four are fighting alongside Doctor Strange and the Silver Surfer to save Eternity from death, Uatu seeks out Gravity's help to act as a "scalpel" to cut out the infected portions of the universe, fulfilling his cosmic destiny. Uatu informs Gravity that his secret identity (which was publicly revealed after his death) has been magically restored.

Gravity later joins the Fifty State Initiative. After passing a leadership course, Gravity is made the leader of Nevada's Initiative team, the Heavy Hitters, where he is joined by Initiative graduates Hardball, Nonstop, and Telemetry.

The Heavy Hitters are one of the few teams not to be infiltrated by the Skrulls during their secret invasion of Earth. Gravity and the Heavy Hitters aid the rest of the Initiative to battle and defeat Skrulls posing as the Revolutionary, Equinox, Thor Girl, and Great Lakes Avengers member Grasshopper. During the battle with the Skrull Grasshopper, Flatman invites Gravity to join his home-state team, which he quickly rejects. The surviving members of the Initiative storm Camp Hammond and retake it from the Skrulls. When Hardball confesses to Komodo that he has been forced to become a Hydra double agent, Komodo enlists Gravity and the rest of the Heavy Hitters to help free him. However, the plan backfires when Hardball feels betrayed by Komodo and his team. He forcibly quits the Initiative and joins Hydra, swearing enmity to his former friends. After the Skrulls' secret invasion, when Norman Osborn gains control of the Initiative, Gravity is replaced as the leader of the Heavy Hitters with Prodigy. Gravity is transferred to Wisconsin as leader of the Great Lakes Avengers, much to his dismay.

=== Young Allies ===
With the fall of Osborn's Initiative, and the abolishment of the Superhuman Registration Act, Gravity quits the Great Lakes Avengers and considers giving up his position as a hero. While flying back to New York, Gravity attempts to save a young couple from a mysterious explosion. However, before he can get them to safety, the couple are killed by Warhead, a member of the anarchist terrorist group known as the Bastards of Evil. In retaliation, Gravity angrily beats the villain unconscious, and finds renewed reason to continue to be a hero.

Returning to his studies at New York University, Gravity finds himself with his friends Lauren and Frog once more. The return of Warhead and the Bastards of Evil, an anarchist group claiming to be the estranged children of supervillains, brings Gravity together with fellow hero and university student Firestar. However, their team-up is not enough to stop Warhead from detonating his powers, killing himself and many others around him at Ground Zero. Becoming obsessed, Gravity struggles to keep up with his double life. He manages to see the errors of his ways with the help of Frog and Firestar respectively.

=== Fear Itself ===
When Steve Rogers requests that Prodigy create a new Initiative of volunteers to combat the growing fear within the nation, Gravity is among the former Initiative members who answer the call. Accompanied by Firestar, Gravity is appointed as co-team leader of one of the sections. His former Heavy Hitters teammate Hardball, recognised as a hero once again due to his role in Camp H.A.M.M.E.R.'s downfall, taunts Gravity for his lack of leadership skills. When Hardball causes an explosion during a battle with Juggernaut, who was transformed into Kuurth: Breaker of Stone, in Las Vegas, Nevada, Gravity confronts him, blaming him for his carelessness. Komodo and Firestar quickly break it up. They later battle Thor Girl, when she regains her designate powers.

== Powers and abilities ==
Greg Willis has the ability to control gravitons, allowing him to manipulate gravity in various ways. His powers enable him to alter the gravity of himself and nearby objects. By controlling his own gravity, Willis is able to fly and simulate superhuman strength. Additionally, he can attract or repel the weight of objects around him by manipulating gravitational forces.

== Reception ==
Gary Walker of Comic Book Resources praised Greg Willis as a relatable and empathetic character, noting his early struggles and internal conflicts that made him endearing to readers. He highlighted Gravity's heroic actions, such as defeating the villain Black Death and sacrificing himself to save other heroes. Despite his self-doubt, Gravity's participation in major Marvel events like Secret Invasion and Spider-Island demonstrated his dedication to heroism, and his character's potential was evident, even if he was never fully embraced as a major hero. His story showcased personal growth and true bravery.

== Other versions ==
=== League of Losers ===
An alternate universe version of Gravity from Earth-6215 appears in the "League of Losers" storyline in Marvel Team-Up #15-18.

=== Marvel Apes ===
An alternate universe primate version of Gravity appears in Marvel Apes.

=== Marvel Zombies: Dead Days ===
A zombified alternate universe version of Gravity from Earth-2149 appears in Marvel Zombies: Dead Days.

=== What If? ===
Various alternative versions of Gravity make minor appearances in What If?.

== In other media ==
Greg Willis / Gravity makes non-speaking cameo appearances in Ultimate Spider-Man.

== Collected editions ==
Title	Material collected	Published date	ISBN
Gravity: Big-City Super Hero	Gravity #1-5	December 2005	978-0785117988
