= Geldoff =

- Geldoff I as depicted in Ultimate Spider-Man #42 (March 2003). Art by Mark Bagley.

Publication information
- Publisher: Marvel Comics
- First appearance: Geldoff I: Ultimate Spider-Man #40; (July 2003); Geldoff II: Avengers: The Initiative #8; (February 2008); Geldoff III (Geldhoff): Uncanny X-Men (vol. 3) #15.INH; (December 2013)
- Created by: Geldoff I: Brian Michael Bendis; Mark Bagley; Geldoff II: Dan Slott; Christos N. Gage; Geldoff III (Geldhoff): Brian Michael Bendis; Kris Anka

In-story information
- Alter ego: Geldoff
- Species: Human mutate
- Notable aliases: Proton; Geldhoff
- Abilities: Ability to generate and discharge explosive energy balls

Geldoff is the name of three fictional characters appearing in American comic books published by Marvel Comics. The first appeared in the Ultimate Marvel Universe's Ultimate Spider-Man #40 (July 2003) written by Brian Michael Bendis with art from Mark Bagley, and set in the alternate continuity of Earth-1610. The second Geldoff was introduced to the main continuity of Earth-616 by Dan Slott and Christos N. Gage in Avengers: The Initiative #8 (February 2008), where he was given the code name, Proton. The third Geldoff, named Geldhoff and also existing on Earth-616 (also created by Brian Michael Bendis, with Kris Anka) was introduced Uncanny X-Men (vol. 3) #15.INH (December 2013), part of the Inhumanity event series.

All three versions of Geldoff are depicted a Latverian orphan, who was adopted by an American couple and moved to New York, where he studied at Queens, before developing the power to generate and discharge explosive energy balls, all three in different ways.

== Fictional character biography ==
Geldoff is a Latverian orphan, a lost heir to the Von Doom family who was adopted by an American couple and became an exchange student in New York City. While drunk at a party, Geldoff destroys several cars with his powers. Aware of Geldoff's rampages, Spider-Man denounces his irresponsible behavior. When the police arrive, Spider-Man leaves, with Geldoff clinging to his back.

Spider-Man tries to convince Geldoff the error of his ways. When Spider-Man pauses to foil a robbery, Geldoff blows up a vehicle outside the shop, injuring the robbers and several civilians. Geldoff believes he is doing good and is surprised when Spider-Man attacks him. Geldoff threatens to use his powers on Spider-Man, but is stopped by the arrival of the X-Men.

Geldoff is taken back to the X-Mansion for examination. At the mansion, Professor Xavier telepathically sedates Geldoff. Recognizing that Cerebro does not register Geldoff as a human or a mutant, Xavier theorizes that he gained his powers from genetic experimentation, having been given the mutant gene during gestation and subsequently abandoned. Xavier plans to present Geldoff to scientific organizations and the United Nations as proof of illegal genetic research. Before Spider-Man leaves, Geldoff apologizes for threatening him.

== Powers and abilities ==
By focusing, Geldoff is able to generate and discharge explosive energy balls, sending them to targets within his line of sight. He appears to be resistant to his own powers.

== Other versions ==
Two alternate-universe versions of Geldoff were introduced in the Earth-616 continuity.

=== Proton Geldoff ===
Proton as depicted in Avengers: The Initiative #9 (March 2008). Art by Stefano Caselli.

Geldoff was introduced into Earth-616 (the core Marvel Universe) by writers Dan Slott and Christos N. Gage along with artist Stefano Caselli. This version is a Fifty State Initiative recruit from Latveria training at the Camp Hammond facility. Geldoff is seen using the codename Proton during a combat training exercise when KIA, a clone of Michael Van Patrick, attacks.

In Secret Invasion, Proton is killed while fighting the Skrull invasion of New York City. Secret Invasion writer Brian Michael Bendis commented on the death of Proton by saying that he had asked Dan Slott which character he could kill off, and stated that Slott had built characters for this exact purpose.

=== Inhuman Geldhoff ===
Another alternate version of Geldoff named Geldhoff (also created by Brian Michael Bendis) is introduced in Inhumanity. He is introduced as a Latverian teenager visiting the United States as part of a student exchange program who manifests dormant Inhuman abilities after being exposed to the mutagenic Terrigen Mist. After briefly battling the X-Men, he is kidnapped by Monica Rappaccini.

== See also ==
- List of Ultimate Spider-Man story arcs
- Ultimate Spider-Man
