= Devil-Slayer =

- Devil-Slayer in Avengers: The Initiative, by Stefano Caselli.

Publication information
- Publisher: Marvel Comics
- First appearance: Marvel Spotlight #33 (April 1977)
- Created by: David Anthony Kraft, Rich Buckler

In-story information
- Alter ego: Eric Simon Payne
- Team affiliations: Defenders; Agents of Fortune; Point Men; Revengers
- Notable aliases: Agent of Death, The Reaper of Souls, "Cape Man"
- Abilities: Telepathy; Telekinesis; Teleportation

Devil-Slayer (Eric Simon Payne) is a fictional character appearing in American comic books published by Marvel Comics. The character exists in Marvel's main shared universe, known as the Marvel Universe.

== Publication history ==
Devil-Slayer was created by David Anthony Kraft and Rich Buckler. According to Kraft, Devil-Slayer was a tweaked version of a character he and Buckler had created in Demon Hunter (1975) for Atlas/Seaboard Comics. On his first day back in the Marvel Comics offices after the collapse of Atlas/Seaboard, Kraft bumped into Buckler in the hall and the two discussed bringing back Demon Hunter. Kraft recounted, "I changed his costume colors, Rich changed his costume design a little bit, we changed his name, of course - but if you look at his backstory it's a direct continuation from the Atlas issue." The character first appeared in Marvel Spotlight #33 (April 1977). Plans for Devil-Slayer to star in additional issues of Marvel Spotlight were halted by the series's cancellation, with Devil-Slayer's debut being the final issue. However, shortly after that he was added to the lineup of the Defenders.

In September 2008, Marvel released a limited series under their MAX imprint titled Dead of Night Featuring Devil-Slayer. It starred Danny Sylva, the great-nephew of the original Devil-Slayer, and was written by Brian Keene and illustrated by Chris Samnee.

== Fictional character biography ==
Eric Payne was born in Queenstown, Illinois. He was a member of a demon cult called the Agents of Fortune, who helped him unlock the psionic potential of his brain and gave him a mystically created dimensional cloak. He later turned on the cult and, with the aid of the Defenders, he battled Vera Gemini and the Xenogesis and helped prevent the cult's mystical plans from being realized.

He assists the Defenders in confronting a cult leader named David. This man had been granted temporary mystical powers by a coalition of demons known as the Six-Fingered Hand. Despite the passing nature of his abilities, Eric's wife Cory chose to stay with the cult leader.

As the Defenders returned to Doctor Strange's home after this confrontation, they were called into action again by the Avengers. The town of Citrusville, Florida had vanished, into a gigantic hole resembling a six-fingered hand. Eric and the rest of the group confronted a possessed Man-Thing and then traveled through dimensional realms to find the source of the problem.

During Eric's time with the Defenders, he helped confront a host of demons, including Balthazar, who had possessed an Air Force commander. The Defenders almost died when Balthazar convinced innocent Air Force pilots that they were spies. Though his demon compatriots were eventually sucked back to their own realm, Balthazar somehow stayed on Earth.

Still in the form of the Air Force soldier, he targeted Devil-Slayer personally. Balthazar tricked Devil-Slayer into a bar full of disguised demons where Eric's drink was altered, thus removing his psychic powers. Despite this, Devil-Slayer held his own, using his magical accessories to battle the demons successfully. Balthazar and Eric were drawn into the Borders of the Land of the Dead, where stood many of his Defender allies, now seemingly dead. It was here that Balthazar was seemingly slain again.

Eric questions his tragic life, and reconciles with his wife, then turns himself in for his past crimes. He later helps war-torn Potega, but loses his shadow-cloak, and then rededicates himself as a hero. Eric is later remitted to an asylum, where he discovers a shard of the Nexus of All Realities that causes him to become Devil-Slayer again.

Nighthawk mentioned he had talked to Eric Payne and that he was willing to join a new team of Defenders. However, when Richmond suggested it to Initiative boss Tony Stark, he declined the offer. Shortly afterwards, Eric is seen as a member of the Hawaiian Initiative team, the Point Men, serving the team as their "Monster Hunter". When 3-D Man arrives in Hawaii, Devil-Slayer informs him that he has sensed portents of doom all day. When 3-D Man identifies team member Magnitude as a Skrull impostor, the Skrull attacks and severely wounds the other Point Men, Star Sign, and Paydirt. The Skrull is killed, and Devil-Slayer uses his Shadow Cloak to teleport 3-D Man to Camp Hammond before taking Star Sign and Paydirt to a hospital. Devil-Slayer later appears in Utah with the cyborg Jocasta to aid 3-D Man and the Skrull Kill Krew. He spends some time teleporting the Krew and their ever-increasing allies across the country to kill Skrulls who have infiltrated the Initiative teams. As forewarned, he runs out of power and faints, leaving the final few confrontations to the speedsters the Krew have recruited.

After Doctor Strange loses his position as Sorcerer Supreme, Devil-Slayer is one of the many magic users approached by the Eye of Agamotto as a potential replacement.

Devil-Slayer (wearing a new costume) is recruited by Wonder Man (whose ionic energy leaking powers were affecting his judgement) to join his Revengers. He and the Revengers are defeated by the three Avengers teams and remanded to the Raft. When he was interrogated, Devil-Slayer stated that he joined the Revengers to create a reality where the Avengers were held accountable for their actions.

== Powers and abilities ==
Eric Simon Payne is a trained soldier and hit man, proficient in nearly all forms of hand-to-hand weaponry and an above-average marksman.

As Devil-Slayer, Payne uses a mystical device called a shadow cloak. The cloak can elongate itself and respond to his mental commands, forming whips and grappling opponents and objects. The inside of the cloak served as a portal to other dimensions. By wrapping himself in folds of the cloak, Payne can teleport to and from other dimensions and could even teleport limited distances on Earth by entering and exiting at different locations. Time also runs differently inside the cloak, allowing Payne to place injured people in a form of stasis.

Payne had also developed certain psychic abilities. He possesses a sixth sense that can detect mystical influence on people or creatures, useful for tracking and finding demons. He also had some degree of telekinesis and telepathy, the latter of which he used to mask his costume with an illusion of civilian clothes. The nature and extent of Payne's powers remains unrevealed.

Payne could also reach into the folds of the cloak and draw out an endless supply of weapons from any time or place. He typically used melee weapons such as swords, axes or maces, but has also removed from it more modern weapons such as automatic rifles and even futuristic weapons such as a plasma rifle. On at least one occasion, he used a staff that conferred upon him a degree of invulnerability and generated energies that he could absorb to enhance his psychic abilities.
