= Crusader (Marvel Comics) =

Crusader is the name of two characters appearing in American comic books published by Marvel Comics. Two versions have made significant appearances while others are minor characters who have utilized the alias.

The first version first appeared in Thor #330 (April, 1983) and was created by writer Alan Zelenetz and penciller Bob Hall.

The second version is a Skrull superhero that first appeared in Marvel Team-Up vol. 3 #23 (Aug. 2006) and was created by Robert Kirkman and Andy Kuhn.

== Fictional character biography ==
=== Arthur Blackwood ===
Crusader
- Crusader. Art by Leinil Yu.

Publication information
- Publisher: Marvel Comics
- First appearance: Thor #330 (April 1983)
- Created by: Alan Zelenetz; Bob Hall

In-story information
- Alter ego: Arthur Charles Blackwood
- Place of origin: Decatur, Illinois
- Abilities: Master swordsman and jouster Superhuman strength, speed, stamina, agility, dexterity, reflexes/reactions and resistance to injury Wears mystical body armor Use of mystical sword and shield

Arthur Blackwood is a seminary student from Decatur, Illinois who believes that the church should be more active in fighting paganism and godlessness. Dismissed from the seminary for his beliefs and getting into an altercation with one of his superiors, Blackwood visits his family crypt to meditate on his life. There, he experiences a vision of all of his ancestors who devoted their lives to serving God. One of Blackwood's ancestors, who participated in the Crusades, gives him the combined power of all his ancestors and dubs him a knight. When Blackwood returns to reality, he discovers that a sword, shield, and knight's raiment have materialized nearby. Blackwood decides to take up the sword and use his power to destroy pagans and infidels as the Crusader.

In the storyline "Civil War", the Crusader forms a religious group of thugs. Crusader and his gang hijack a plane carrying money, from which they plot to attack the headquarters of several heroes. They are confronted by Wolverine, who gouges out Crusader's right eye.

==== Powers and abilities ====
Arthur Blackwood gained superhuman powers after experiencing a religious vision in which he was seemingly bequeathed the combined power of his ancestors who had served God. The Crusader's physical attributes, as well as the power of his sword and shield, are directly related to his will and belief. While he is confident, his strength, speed, stamina, agility, dexterity, reflexes, and resistance to injury are sufficient for him to stand toe-to-toe with the likes of Thor. However, if his faith wavers, his superhuman powers rapidly disappear. Upon transforming into the Crusader, he instantly summons his mystical body armor, sword, and shield. These items are strong enough to withstand repeated blows by Thor's hammer Mjolnir before shattering. As the Crusader, he is a master swordsman and jouster. Blackwood earned a master's degree, though his studies towards Doctorate of Divinity remain uncompleted.

=== Z'Reg ===
Crusader
- Crusader in his human form. Art by Harvey Tolibao.

Publication information
- Publisher: Marvel Comics
- First appearance: Marvel Team-Up vol. 3 #23 (Aug. 2006)
- Created by: Robert Kirkman; Andy Kuhn

In-story information
- Alter ego: Z'Reg
- Species: Skrull
- Place of origin: Skrull Empire
- Team affiliations: The Initiative
- Notable aliases: Aubrey Thompson
- Abilities: Shapeshifting; Reality manipulation via cosmic powered ring

Z'Reg is a Skrull operative who was sent to spy on the Avengers, but arrived on Earth after the Avengers had disbanded. Falling in love with the planet's customs and superheroes under the civilian identity of Aubrey Thompson, Z'Reg decides to become a superhero under the name Crusader.

Crusader soon becomes the mentor of Freedom Ring. After Freedom Ring is killed by Iron Maniac, Crusader takes the boy's reality-altering ring for himself. He subsequently disguises himself as a human to join the Fifty State Initiative.

KIA, a clone of Michael Van Patrick, attacks Camp Hammond and severs Crusader's hand. His hand is surgically reattached, but Crusader fears that medical examination will expose him as a Skrull. In response, he uses his ring to make himself appear human and his medical test results appear normal.

In the storyline Secret Invasion, the Initiative is infiltrated by Skrulls, causing Crusader to fear that he will be exposed as a Skrull despite his good intentions. Despite Crusader's efforts, 3-D Man realizes that he is a Skrull and shoots him through the head, apparently killing him.

==== Powers and abilities ====
Z'Reg is a Skrull with the ability to shapeshift into virtually any form that he chooses and replicate the powers of other heroes. Later, he takes Curtis Doyle's ring as an honor for his death. The ring was crafted from a fragment of a destroyed Cosmic Cube which allows the wearer to alter reality within a radius of roughly 15-foot (4.6 m) around him, giving him a 30-foot (9.1 m) sphere of reality he can alter.
