= Thor Girl =

- Tarene / Thor Girl. Art by Tom Raney.

Publication information
- Publisher: Marvel Comics
- First appearance: Thor vol. 2 #22 (April 2000)
- Created by: Dan Jurgens; John Romita Jr.

In-story information
- Alter ego: Tarene
- Species: Alien
- Team affiliations: The Initiative
- Notable aliases: The Designate; The Supreme; Thunder Girl; Thor Girl
- Abilities: Superhuman strength, stamina, durability, speed, agility, and reflexes; Cosmic energy manipulation; Regenerative healing factor; Immortality; Hammer granting: Weather manipulation; Dimensional travel; Energy blasts; Flight

Thor Girl (Tarene) is a superheroine appearing in American comic books published by Marvel Comics. Created by writer Dan Jurgens and artist John Romita Jr., the character first appeared in Thor vol. 2 #22 (April 2000). Tarene is the object of a prophecy stating that she will help life reach a new level of existence throughout the universe.

== Publication history ==
Tarene debuted in Thor vol. 2 #22 (April 2000), created by writer Dan Jurgens and artist John Romita Jr. She appeared in the 2011 Fear Itself: Youth in Revolt series.

== Fictional character biography ==
Tarene is an alien entity known as the Designate, who will help evolve sentient beings to the next level of existence. Her existence was prophesized billions of years prior by the sorcerer X'Hoss. In the present, Thanos (later retconned as a clone) obtains X'Hoss' knowledge and destroys Tarene's home planet.

Tarene transforms herself into an Asgardian goddess, taking the name "Thor Girl" and the human identity of Tara. In a later battle against Surtur, Thor Girl sacrifices nearly all of her cosmic powers to defeat him. Thor Girl knows that she will eventually regain her full power and become the Designate.

=== Civil War/The Initiative ===
Thor Girl is one of the heroes who register with the Superhuman Registration Act that was passed during the 2006–2007 "Civil War" storyline. Thor Girl interferes in a jewel theft undertaken by the Grey Gargoyle, a previous foe of hers, and dispatches him, preventing the jewel heist in the process. In return, the Grey Gargoyle undertakes a lawsuit with the assistance of Mallory Book at the Superhuman Law Offices of Goodman, Lieber, Kurtzberg & Holliway.

Thor Girl is one of the first recruits for the Camp Hammond training facility. The Initiative recruits are sent as crowd control in Manhattan with Thor Girl aiding mass evacuation when the city is attacked by the Hulk, who is seeking revenge on the Illuminati. However, Rage breaks ranks to try to help the Avengers in battle against the Hulk and his Warbound, and Thor Girl is among the trainees who sides with Rage. Easily defeated, Thor Girl and the others are imprisoned at Manhattan Square Gardens and controlled by obedience disks. The Initiative's black ops team, including Trauma, are sent in to free Thor Girl and her compatriots. Thor Girl and Ultra Girl are assigned to the Cavalry, Georgia's superhero team, after completing their Initiative training.

=== Secret Invasion ===
During the Secret Invasion storyline, the Skrull impersonating Dum Dum Dugan calls all the sleeper agents in the Initiative, causing Ultra Girl and Thor Girl to fight each other out of fear. When the Skrull Kill Krew arrives to the scene, 3-D Man confirms that Thor Girl is a Skrull, killing her with her own hammer with the help of Gravity. After the invasion is over, the real Thor Girl is shown in a support group meeting with others who had been replaced by Skrulls.

=== Fear Itself ===
During the Fear Itself storyline, Thor Girl joins the New Initiative under Prodigy's leadership. She is quite confused about why Odin took all of the Asgardians back to the Asgard Realm, and is still deciding as to whether she should join them. While saving some people in the city, she is attacked because she has a hammer similar to those which had been appearing all around Earth, and accidentally kills a police officer who shot at her by deflecting the bullets back into him. Due to a misunderstanding, Thor Girl is attacked by the other heroes, despite her attempts to explain that she was only acting in defense. During the battle, Thor Girl's designate powers return. Disappointed with humanity due to her recent experiences, Thor Girl leaves Earth.

== Powers and abilities ==
Tarene has the conventional physical attributes of Asgardian gods after turning into an Asgardian goddess. She possesses superhuman strength, stamina, durability, speed, agility, and reflexes. Her godly life-force enables faster recovery time. Tarene has a wide range of cosmic powers. She is effectively immortal and immune to all Earth-based diseases.

Additionally, Tarene wields a golden hammer which returns to her when thrown. She can use it to fly, fire energy beams, control the weather, and traverse dimensional barriers, such as from Earth to Asgard.

== Reception ==
=== Critical response ===
Screen Rant included Tarene in their "Marvel Comics: 15 Most Powerful Enchanted Hammer Users (Who Aren't Thor)" list. Comic Book Resources ranked Tarene 1st in their "Avengers: The 10 Most Powerful Recruits From The Fifty State Initiative" list, 9th in their "15 Craziest Versions Of Thor" list, and 19th in their "20 Strongest Versions Of Thor" list.

== Other versions ==
An alternate version of Tarene appears in one alternate future world. She tried to reach back in time to empower the alien Desak trying to locate a missing Thor.

== In other media ==
Tarene / Thor Girl appears as a playable character in Lego Marvel's Avengers, voiced by Kate Higgins.
