= Skrull Kill Krew =

Fictional comic book group

- Cover of Skrull Kill Krew #1 (September 1995)

Group publication information
- Publisher: Marvel Edge (Marvel Comics)
- First appearance: Skrull Kill Krew #1 (September 1995)
- Created by: Grant Morrison; Mark Millar; Brendan McCarthy; Steve Yeowell

In-story information
- Type of organization: Team
- Agent(s): Ryder; 3-D Man; Riot; Catwalk; Dice; Moonstomp

Skrull Kill Krew

Series publication information
- Format: Limited series
- Genre: Superhero
- Publication date: (vol. 1); September 1995 – January 1996 (vol. 2); June – December 2009
- Number of issues: (vol. 1); 5 (vol. 2); 5

Creative team
- Writer(s): (vol. 1); Grant Morrison; Mark Millar (vol. 2); Adam Felber
- Penciller(s): (vol. 1); Steve Yeowell (vol. 2); Mark Robinson
- Inker(s): (vol. 1); Chris Ivy (vol. 2); Mike Getty
- Letterer(s): (vol. 1); Richard Starkings; Comicraft (vol. 2); Joe Caramagna
- Colorist(s): (vol. 1); Chia-Chi Wang (vol. 2); Andres Mossa
- Creator(s): Grant Morrison; Mark Millar; Steve Yeowell
- Editor(s): (vol. 1); Tom Brevoort (vol. 2); Thomas Brennan; Joe Quesada; Stephen Wacker

Collected editions
- Skrull Kill Krew: ISBN 0-7851-2120-X
- Dark Reign: Skrull Kill Krew: ISBN 0-7851-3849-8
- Skrulls Must Die! The Complete Skrull Kill Krew: ISBN 0-7851-9407-X

The Skrull Kill Krew are a fictional group appearing in American comic books published by Marvel Comics. They first appeared in their own miniseries published in 1995. They were created by Grant Morrison, Mark Millar and Steve Yeowell.

The group are humans modified by eating Skrull-infected beef. Some of the team returned during the Skrulls' Secret Invasion, which led to another miniseries.

== Publication history ==
The team first appeared in their own eponymous series written by Grant Morrison and Mark Millar, published in 1995. It was one of Tom Brevoort's first projects and came about when Morrison and Millar faxed the Marvel offices looking for work:

As a low-ranking editor, I didn't really have many cards to play in terms of securing popular characters for any project I might come up with. So the best strategy was to come up with something new.

...

This was the period when the mad cow disease scares were taking place in the UK, so it was a short leap for Grant and Mark to hit on the notion that those Skrull cows had been slaughtered, their meat entered the food chain, and that those who wound up eating it developed Skrull-like abilities, which they would use to hunt down the secret Skrull infiltrators that were living among us. It was a very 2000 AD sort of an idea: part parody, part over-the-top action/adventure comic. Grant was also looking around for new paradigms onto which to paint the super hero team structure, and in this case the model would be a motorcycle gang. Believe me, for the Marvel of 1994, this was some pretty off-the-wall thinking.

The original idea for the team name was the Skrull Kill Kult, based on the band Thrill Kill Kult, but Marvel's editor-in-chief Tom DeFalco objected to the use of "Kult" because "he felt that it made the series seem like too much of an endorsement of murder cults". Brendan McCarthy designed the characters and Steve Yeowell was brought on board to provide the pencils, the same division of labor on Morrison's Zenith, because of "a lukewarm reception to Steve's initial visualizations".

The series was originally announced as an ongoing series. However, it was changed to a miniseries, because of wider problems in the American comic book market in the mid-1990s and changes at Marvel, with DeFalco leaving. There were four issues worth of scripts done at the time and Brevoort managed to argue for a fifth to close the miniseries.

They then made an appearance in Avengers: The Initiative #16 as one of the Secret Invasion tie-ins and writer Dan Slott announced at the 2008 Baltimore Comic-Con that they would be getting a new miniseries featuring the new line-up. It was a five-issue miniseries written by Adam Felber, and saw the original team brought back together to fight the descendants of the original Skrull-cows.

== Fictional team biography ==
The Fantastic Four, early in their career, defeated a group of Skrull spies. Reed Richards brainwashed them into becoming cows and retaining that form for life. The milk from these cows affected the inhabitants of a small dairy town named King's Crossing, giving them shapeshifting powers. The Fantastic Four, via a girl that Johnny Storm was dating at the time, ended up investigating the town and neutralizing the threat.

The cows are later shipped to a slaughterhouse and butchered as beef. When consumed, the meat transferred the Skrull's adaptable DNA code into their consumers' bodies. This caused a condition dubbed Skrullovoria-Induced Skrullophobia, which gave victims shapeshifting abilities similar to Skrulls and an intense fear or hatred of Skrulls. Only a small number of humans proved susceptible to this syndrome, and most did not survive the initial stages of infection. Several of the survivors were gathered together by a man known only as Ryder, who had himself contracted Skrullophobia, to act out their increasingly irrational impulses by killing Skrulls.

=== Secret Invasion ===
Ryder and Riot return to ferret out more Skrulls. The other three are still alive, their heads kept in jars, as their Skrull infestation has resulted in the loss of their bodies. They encounter 3-D Man in the New Mexico desert and save him from a Skrull posing as the 'She-Thing'. 3-D Man joins them in rooting out Blacksmith of the Desert Stars, another Skrull, and killing him as well. They are next seen helping Nevada's Fifty State Initiative team, the Heavy Hitters, deal with a Skrull posing as an unnamed team member. They found out that in every Initiative state team is one Skrull impostor and decided to kill them all. Komodo and her lover Hardball both join with the team as well. The Skrull Kill Krew thought they would not be able to track Skrulls through all the states on time, but then former Avenger Jocasta appeared with Devil-Slayer, who is a member of the Hawaiian Initiative team, the Point Men. Devil-Slayer has teleportation powers, thus allowing the group to speed up their plans. Most Skrull-killing incidents end with a few more ad-hoc recruits.

Later, Ryder reveals that he still has the heads of Moonstomp, Dice and Catwalk, who can also track down Skrulls. He gives the three heads to the speedsters Whiz Kid, Spinner, and Nonstop. The team splits up into six different squads, each one to search for the six remaining Skrull sleeper agents within the Initiative teams and destroy devices within each Initiative building that could assist the Skrulls in destroying the United States. Despite multiple failures (including the death of Spinner), the devices are never set off.

After the Skrulls are defeated, Moonstomp, Dice and Catwalk's heads all die, and Riot reverts to human form, dying as well. 3-D Man and Ryder then leave her behind and set out to find and kill any Skrulls that might still be on Earth.

Ryder is working alone, attacking nightclubs for Skrulls. Riot is revealed to have survived and is looking on Match.com for a woman. 3-D Man is not an active participant. It was later revealed that Ryder has obtained some means of reviving his former teammates via an unknown liquid. The miniseries' second issue ends with Moonstomp's head reanimating as his body regenerates. Ryder succeeds in reviving Moonstomp, Dice, and Catwalk. The reunited team then faces off against the descendants of the Skrulls that were hypnotized into being cows. Following the battle against the Skrulls, Moonstomp leaves the team.

It is later revealed that, in addition to cows, the Fantastic Four had transformed one of the original Skrull invaders into a duck. The duck was eaten by a young Chinese-American girl named Tara Tam, who gained superhuman abilities as a result. The members of the Skrull Kill Krew tried to recruit Tara as part of the group, but she turned them down out of fear over how her parents would react. Years later, Tara would become the partner of Howard the Duck.

== Membership ==
=== Current ===
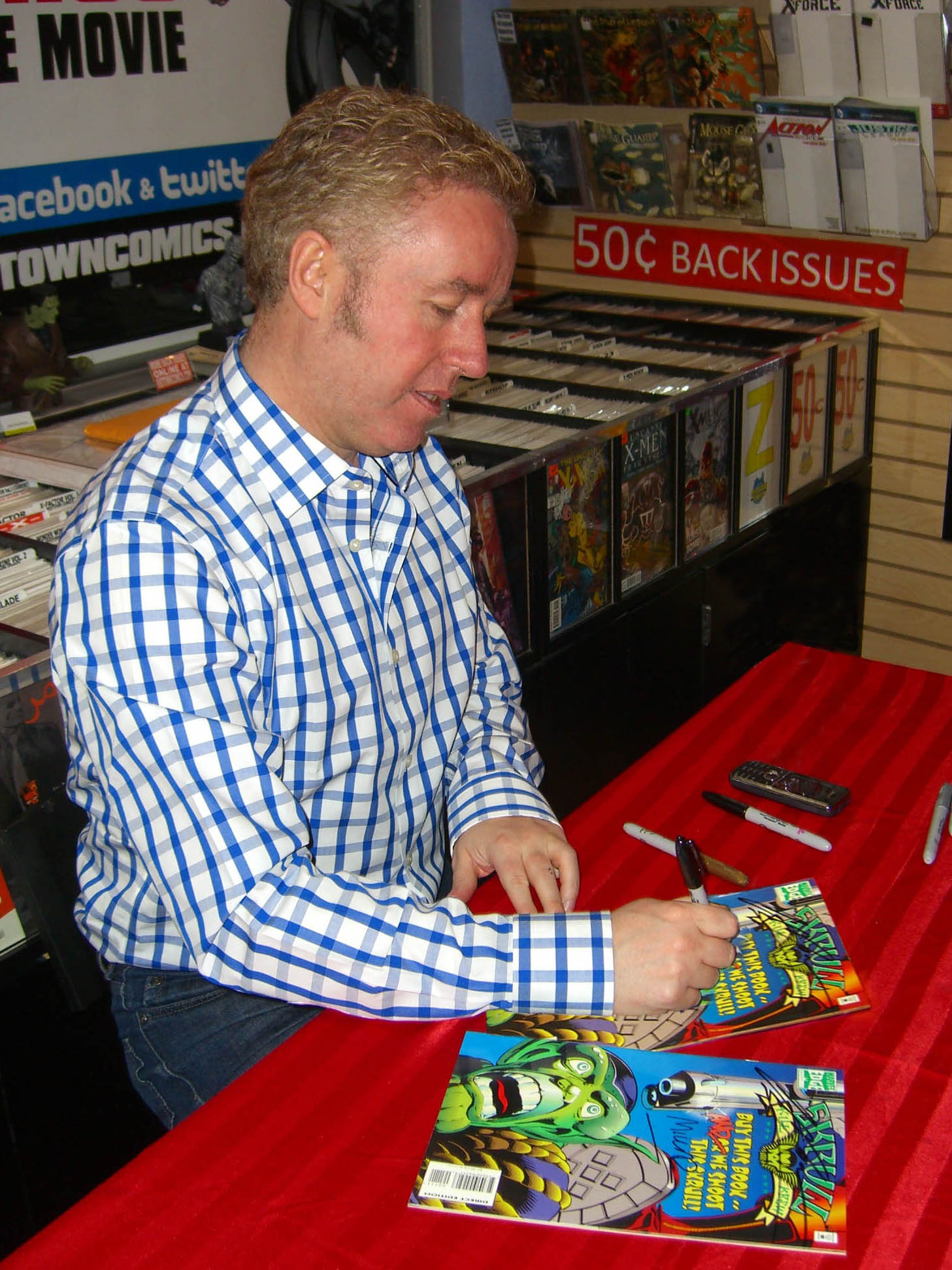
Writer Mark Millar signing copies of the book during an appearance at Midtown Comics in Manhattan

- Ryder - Founder and leader. In addition to shapeshifting, he can teleport, has enhanced strength and reflexes, and carries many firearms. He prefers to animate his hair into snake-like tentacles. It is implied that he may be one of the Skrulls who were turned into cows who ultimately was able to grant himself a human appearance, but losing his memory in the process and believing himself a regular human affected by Skrullovoria-Induced Skrullophobia.
- 3-D Man - An African American who inherited his powers from the first 3-D Man, a 1950s anti-Skrull hero. 3-D Man is able to perceive Skrulls in their true forms.
- Heidi Sladkin / Riot - Punk rocker. Turns into an armored insectoid form. In this form she has great strength and sharp spines.
- Kimberly Dee / Catwalk - Former fashion model who transforms into a feline/humanoid form. In this form, she has enhanced athletic abilities, claws and fangs.
- Rob Fortune / Dice - Former surfer. He can breathe underwater and transform his limbs into weapons, which project explosive blasts.

=== Former ===
- Moonstomp - British neo-Nazi skinhead. Hates Skrulls so much that he is willing to work with Ryder (a black man), even though he feels like he is compromising his values by doing so. He has some shapeshifting powers, but prefers to bash his foes with a normal claw hammer. During the series, his degenerative condition worsens, causing him to develop patches of dark skin, which displeases him immensely. He was let go, or rather beaten to a pulp, by the other members when he began to go on a killing spree.

== Collected editions ==
Title	Material collected	Published date	ISBN
Skrull Kill Krew	Skrull Kill Krew (vol. 1) #1-5	June 2006	978-0785121206
Dark Reign: Skrull Kill Krew	Skrull Kill Krew (vol. 2) #1-5, material from Dark Reign: New Nation	December 2009	978-0785138495
Skrulls Must Die! The Complete Skrull Kill Krew	Skrull Kill Krew (vol. 1) #1-5, Avengers: The Initiative #16-19, Skrull Kill Krew (vol. 2) #1-5, material from Dark Reign: New Nation	April 2015	978-0785194071

== In other media ==
In 2006 it was revealed that the series was considered for a TV series adaptation, but it never came to fruition.
