= Ragnarok (comics) =

Supervillain in Marvel Comics

- Ragnarok from the cover of Civil War #4 (September 2006). Art by Michael Turner.

Publication information
- Publisher: Marvel Comics
- First appearance: Civil War #3 (July 2006)
- Created by: Mark Millar; Steve Mcniven

In-story information
- Species: Cyborg Clone
- Team affiliations: Dark Avengers; Thunderbolts
- Notable aliases: Thor, Clor, Project Lightning
- Abilities: Superhuman strength, speed, agility, stamina, durability, reflexes and longevity; Master hand to hand combatant; Immunity to all Earthly diseases; Via high tech hammer: Flight; Energy absorption and projection; Lightning manipulation

Ragnarok is a supervillain appearing in American comic books published by Marvel Comics. A cyborg clone of the hero Thor, Ragnarok has a similar appearance and abilities but uses them in opposition to the established heroes.

== Publication history ==
Ragnarok first appeared in Civil War #3 (July 2006) and was created by Mark Millar and Steve Mcniven.

Ragnarok began appearing as a regular character in the Dark Avengers series, beginning with Dark Avengers #175.

== Fictional character biography ==
When Thor is missing in action and presumed dead, Tony Stark takes one of Thor's hairs, which he had retained from the first meeting of the Avengers. He helped Reed Richards and Hank Pym create a clone of Thor, who is enhanced with Stark Industries technology. During the superhero Civil War, the clone is sent to battle anti-registration heroes. After the clone kills Bill Foster, Reed Richards deactivates him with a vocal code and later operates on his brain to prevent such a mishap from happening again. The clone returns during the final battle between the pro- and anti-registration heroes, during which Hercules defeats him by ramming his own hammer into his skull.

The clone's remains are taken to Camp Hammond and stored in the laboratory for experimentation. During the "Secret Invasion" storyline, it is revealed that the Hank Pym, who helped create the cyborg clone, was actually the clone of a Skrull impostor named Criti Noll. Noll had placed a program into the cloned Thor's remains as a contingency in case of the invasion's failure. Unless a special code, which only Noll knew, was input every eighteen days, the clone would reawaken. Following Noll's death, the clone reawakens. Malfunctioning and believing himself to be Thor, the clone threatens Baron Von Blitzschlag into returning his hammer to him and sets out to destroy the Initiative. He takes on the name Ragnarok, which Von Blitzschlag had called him, declaring that he would "bring the end of all that is". Von Blitzschlag tells Ragnarok that the real Thor has returned and has formed a new Asgard floating above Broxton, Oklahoma. Disgusted by what he perceives as Asgard's "indignity", Ragnarok leaves Camp Hammond to confront Thor. Thor fights Ragnarok and easily destroys him.

Norman Osborn has A.I.M. rebuild Ragnarok and places him under his control. Ragnarok is severely injured in a fight with the New Avengers and nearly killed by Iron Fist. Ragnarok later appears alongside the former Dark Avengers as a member of the Thunderbolts.

Ragnarok and the Dark Avengers team are transported to the alternate universe of Earth-13584, where they are captured by that world's version of Iron Man. Moonstone and Ragnarok arrive at the site where this universe's version of Thor died and where Thor's hammer Mjolnir lies. Ragnarok acknowledges that he is just a copy of the real Thor and that he does not know who or what he is. He then grasps Mjolnir and is deemed worthy to wield it, gaining a new bald-headed look and goatee. Ragnarok and the Dark Avengers arrive at an A.I.M. base, where they find a portal that allows them to return to their universe.

== Powers and abilities ==
As a cyborg clone of Thor, Ragnarok possesses a portion of the powers and knowledge of the God of Thunder prior to Thor's acquisition of the Odinforce. This includes super-strength, extensive combat knowledge, godly stamina, high resistance to physical injury, immunity to all Earthly diseases, and superhuman agility and reflexes.

Ragnarok's hammer, though not the enchanted Mjolnir, is constructed of a vibranium and adamantium alloy. The hammer is able to absorb and discharge lightning, like the true Mjolnir, and has circuitry within its head, which allows Ragnarok to direct it mentally. However, unlike Mjolnir, it can be picked up or lifted by others.

During a visit to Earth-13584, Ragnarok acquires that universe's version of Mjolnir and is accepted as worthy to wield it.

== Reception ==
In 2022, Screen Rant included Ragnarok in their "10 Most Powerful Hercules Villains In Marvel Comics" list.

== Other versions ==
An alternate universe version of Ragnarok appears in the one-shot "What if Iron Man Lost the Civil War". This version was released prematurely due to an agent on board the Helicarrier detecting a device that Captain America would have used to disable Iron Man's armor. When Ragnarok attempts to kill Bill Foster, Iron Man blocks the blast. Ragnarok then attempts to kill Iron Man, but Captain America holds him off long enough for Iron Man's armor to repair itself. Iron Man and Captain America join forces to battle Ragnarok, inspiring every other hero in the pro/anti-registration conflict to work together.

== In other media ==
=== Video games ===
- Ragnarok appears in Marvel: Avengers Alliance as a member of Red Skull's Dark Avengers.
- Ragnarok appears as a playable character in Lego Marvel's Avengers.
- Ragnarok appears as a playable character in Lego Marvel Super Heroes 2.
- Ragnarok appears as a playable character in Marvel Puzzle Quest.

=== Merchandise ===
A figure of Ragnarok was released in Hasbro's 3.75" Marvel Universe Gigantic Battles line, packaged with a 12" Goliath figure. A 6" scale Marvel Legends version was also released as a Target exclusive.
