= Delroy Garrett =

- Delroy Garrett as the 3-D Man in Avengers World #15.

Publication information
- Publisher: Marvel Comics
- First appearance: The Avengers vol. 3 #8 (September 1998)
- Created by: Kurt Busiek (writer); George Pérez (artist)

In-story information
- Alter ego: Delroy Garrett, Jr.
- Species: Human mutate
- Team affiliations: Astonishing Avengers; Triune Understanding; Secret Avengers; Agents of Atlas; Skrull Kill Krew; The Initiative; Point Men; Avengers
- Notable aliases: Triathlon; 3-D Man
- Abilities: Superhuman strength and speed; Ability to see Skrulls in their original form; Regenerative healing factor

Delroy Garrett is a superhero appearing in American comic books published by Marvel Comics. Created by Kurt Busiek and George Pérez, the character first appeared in Avengers vol. 3 #8 (September 1998). The character has also been known as Triathlon and 3-D Man at various points in his history.

== Publication history ==
Delroy Garrett debuted in Avengers vol. 3 #8 (September 1998), created by writer Kurt Busiek and artist George Pérez. He appeared in the 2007 Avengers: The Initiative series, by writer Dan Slott and artist Stefano Caselli. He appeared in the 2010 Atlas series, by writer Jeff Parker. He appeared in the 2020 Atlantis Attacks series, by writer Greg Pak and artist Ario Anindito.

== Fictional character biography ==
Delroy Garrett is an Olympic track medalist whose career was derailed when it was found he used steroids. Dejected, Delroy joined the Triune Understanding to restore his faith. Triune leader Jonathan Tremont imbued Delroy with powers stolen from the former superhero 3-D Man. Delroy had no idea of the source of his new powers, thinking that the teachings of the Triune had simply unlocked his superhuman potential. Delroy became the costumed superhero Triathlon and the Triune's celebrity spokesman.

Garrett's first involvement with the Avengers came while he was using the identity of Triathlon; he assisted them in defeating arms dealer Moses Magnum. Soon after, Garrett also helped the Avengers battle Lord Templar and Pagan at the dedication ceremony of a new Triune Understanding building. The battle ended with Lord Templar and Pagan escaping. Jonathan Tremont publicly blamed the Avengers for the destruction, and then covertly set up a smear campaign against the team to suggest they were religiously intolerant and racist. Tremont then had the mercenary Taskmaster frame a number of Avengers for the destruction of an important Triune building. Tremont then publicly "forgave" the Avengers, which the team grudgingly went along with to avoid further bad publicity. It was during Tremont's media event at Avengers Mansion that the building was attacked by a terrorist. Triathlon aided the Avengers in defeating the terrorist. In the aftermath, the Avengers' government liaison Duane Freeman suggested that the team add Triathlon as a member to quell the bad publicity that the team had recently engendered. With some animosity on both sides, Triathlon was made a member of the Avengers when a new line-up was announced to the public.

At first, Triathlon, although a capable member, constantly complained and argued with his teammates, thinking that they were intolerant and included him on the team only because of the public image. But Warbird told him that he could either go around with a chip on his shoulder and never fit in or actually try to work with his teammates as people and take the chance they would be imperfect. Delroy saw that his teammates were good people and became an eager and willing team member, even refusing to attend Triune functions if it conflicted with his schedule with the Avengers.

During Kang the Conqueror's war on Earth, a being of immense power entered the Solar System. This was the "triple evil" which Tremont had supposedly founded the Triune Understanding to defeat. Powering up the Triune's spaceship, Tremont and the Avengers traveled to face the being. During the battle, Tremont's true reasoning became clear: he sought the power of the "triple evil" for his own. In the past, he had stolen the triangle power of 3-D Man, and resurrected his two dead brothers as Lord Templar and Pagan. He then formed the Triune Understanding to enable him to find the other triangle fragments of power. The "triple evil" contained the final power he sought. During the battle, Tremont killed his brothers and his followers by drawing all their power and life energy into himself, intending to take the power of the Triple Evil and use it to become a god to those on Earth, but he ultimately lost control of the immense power. Triathlon, though, was able to channel the power and defeated the "triple evil", realising that the power could only be controlled by one who strived for others rather than for themselves. With Triathlon now in control of the pyramid, the Avengers then returned to Earth and ultimately defeated Kang and the Scarlet Centurion in their bid to take over the planet. Following Kang's defeat, Triathlon dissolved the pyramid's remaining energies to prevent it being any further threat, subsequently sacrificing the last of his power to restore the 3-D Man and his brother to their independent forms. When the Avengers later reorganized under a United Nations charter, Triathlon left the team along with some other members.

Triathlon appears in JLA/Avengers, where he is taken over by Starro. Triathlon is defeated by the Rhino, but being a then-current member of the Avengers, he reappears among the Avengers at the end being transported away from Krona's base when the timestream gets realigned and the DC Universe and the Marvel Universes are separated.

During the Civil War storyline, Garrett re-emerged as a member of Captain America's Secret Avengers, declaring his stance against the Superhuman Registration Act. He was named among the missing in the wake of the final battle.

Following the Superhuman Registration Act's passage, Garrett was recruited in the Fifty State Initiative. Serving as a squad instructor, he assisted in the training of new recruits while training to become a team leader for one of the 50 states. Garrett took on a new alias, 3-D Man, and when his Initiative training was complete he was assigned to Hawaii.

During the Secret Invasion storyline, Delroy arrives in Hawaii and is greeted by Point Men team members Star Sign and Paydirt. He encounters Devil-Slayer on the way to the base, who states that he has sensed portents of doom all day. When he meets the final team member Magnitude, the goggles Delroy obtained from the original 3-D Man allow him to identify Magnitude as a Skrull impostor. The Skrull Magnitude (who has the powers of Banshee, Havok, Polaris, and Sunfire) attacks and severely wounds Star Sign and Paydirt, but Delroy kills the Skrull with a sword magically summoned by Devil-Slayer. Devil-Slayer uses his Shadow Cloak to teleport Delroy to Camp Hammond, where he announced to everyone assembled that the Initiative has been infiltrated by Skrulls. The Crusader, fearing that he will be exposed as a Skrull, uses the Cosmic Ring to make 3-D Man see every non-Skrull surrounding him as a Skrull. The Crusader persuades the 3-D Man to take a Quinjet and get help, but only because it would take him out of range of his ring's influence. Mid-flight, the Quinjet is affected by the virus the Skrulls used to infect all Starktech systems, and the 3-D Man crashes somewhere in New Mexico. There, he meets and joins the Skrull Kill Krew after they vanquish the Skrull posing as the She-Thing. He assists them when his goggles identify Blacksmith of the Desert Stars as a Skrull and kills him. Delroy's goggles also identify Equinox as a Skrull, who is then killed by Cloud 9. While in Philadelphia, the Revolutionary is revealed as a Skrull and defeated by Gravity and Hope. When they come across a fight between Thor Girl and Ultra Girl, Delroy's goggles identify Thor Girl as a Skrull. With help from Gravity, Delroy uses Thor Girl's own hammer to kill the Skrull impostor. When it came to a crowd uprising dealing with Skrulls in the form of civilians, Delroy's goggles were broken by a thrown rock, giving his allies a hard time finding out which of the civilians were Skrulls. During the struggle, Delroy discovers that he can see who is a Skrull without his goggles. This turns the tides against those Skrulls disguised as crowd members. When it came to the fight at Camp Hammond, Delroy kills a central infiltrator and his Skrull-detecting abilities detect the Crusader as a Skrull after the Crusader kills Criti Noll so Delroy shoots and apparently kills the Crusader.

Delroy leaves the Initiative, noting the hostility of Red Nine, Annex, Geiger, Batwing, and Prodigy over the Crusader's shooting, and joins Ryder to hunt for any Skrulls still hiding out on Earth.

Delroy approached the Agents of Atlas in helping investigate strange questions regarding his history and powers. He was later asked to join the team, an offer he accepted.

During the AXIS storyline, Delroy is among the heroes recruited by the inverted Doctor Doom to join his team of Avengers.

During the Secret Empire storyline, Garrett is shown to be among the superheroes on the run following Hydra's takeover of the United States. He was apprehended by Deadpool who was working as a member of Hydra's Avengers at the time.

Delroy and the Agents of Atlas are sent by Atlas' leader Jimmy Woo to a temple in Thailand to rescue Avenger X from General Nurong and his forces. During the mission, the group encounters Nurong's master, a dragon named Mr. Thong, who warns them of the upcoming Clash of Dragons.

During the Atlantis Attacks storyline, Delroy and his teammates are introduced to the New Agents of Atlas by Woo. Delroy, along with Brawn, the Uranian and M-11 are able keep the portal-city Pan's portals stable and release the Atlantean dragon Pan had previously captured to power itself, briefly easing tensions between the two nations.

== Powers and abilities ==
Delroy Garrett possesses superhuman attributes, such as superhuman strength and speed. He has the ability to identify Skrulls in disguise. He can recover from injuries faster than a regular human being.

== Reception ==
=== Critical response ===
Comic Book Resources ranked Delroy Garrett 8th in their "8 Fastest Avengers" list, 9th in their "Marvel Comics: 10 Most Powerful Members Of Agents Of Atlas" list, 10th in their "Marvel: 10 Best Star Athletes Who Became Superheroes" list, 20th in their "Marvel: The 20 Fastest Speedsters" list, and 24th in their "25 Fastest Characters In The Marvel Universe" list. Darren Franich of Entertainment Weekly ranked Delroy Garrett 53rd in their "Let's Rank Every Avenger Ever" list. Rob Bricken of Gizmodo ranked Delroy Garrett 65th in their "Every Member Of The Avengers" list. Matthew Perpetua and Daniel Kibblesmith of BuzzFeed ranked Delroy Garrett 82nd in their "84 Avengers Members Ranked From Worst To Best" list.
