= Komodo (comics) =

Komodo is the name of two fictional characters appearing in American comic books published by Marvel Comics. Komodo was created by Dan Slott and Stefano Caselli. The character's first appearance was in Avengers: The Initiative #1.

== Publication history ==
Komodo was created by writer Dan Slott and artist Stefano Caselli, and first appeared in Avengers: The Initiative #1 (June 2007). She appeared regularly in Avengers: The Initiative #16 (October 2008) through #22 (April 2009), and was one of the feature characters in the 2011 six-issue limited series Fear Itself: Youth in Revolt.

== Fictional character biography ==
=== New Men ===
The first Komodo is one of the New Men, creatures evolved by the High Evolutionary from normal animals. He accompanies the Ani-Men on a clean-up mission at the Jackal's laboratory and battles the Scarlet Spider. Later, the Cult of the Jackal infiltrates the High Evolutionary's citadel, and Komodo fights the cultist Caiman until the High Evolutionary brings the fight to an end.

=== Komodo (Melati Kusuma) ===
Komodo
- Cover art for Avengers: The Initiative #3. Art by Jim Cheung.

Publication information
- Publisher: Marvel Comics
- First appearance: Avengers: The Initiative #1
- Created by: Dan Slott; Stefano Caselli

In-story information
- Alter ego: Melati Kusuma
- Species: Human mutate
- Team affiliations: The Initiative; Desert Stars; Shadow Initiative
- Abilities: Genius chemist and geneticist Superhuman strength, agility, stamina and reflexes Regenerative healing factor Hardened scales Prehensile tail Razor sharp claws and teeth

The second Komodo, Melati Kusuma, is a former student of Curt Connors. After losing her legs in a car accident, Melati steals Connors' regenerative Lizard Formula and uses it on herself, gaining a lizard-like appearance and abilities. Connors registers Melati for the Fifty State Initiative and she is sent to Camp Hammond.

At the camp, Melati is the victim of a training accident; her arm is blown off by Armory, whose powers are out of control. The arm regenerates in moments. During a "field trip" to Texas to save the President from Hydra, she performs very well and is cleared to perform field work. She works with War Machine in an attempt to use S.P.I.N. (Super-Power-Inhibiting Nanobots) technology to take away Spider-Man's powers. Spider-Man calls Melati a "dollar-store version of the Lizard" and warns her that her powers would be taken away. Komodo begs War Machine not to have her powers removed as she considers her former human identity to be a nobody.

During World War Hulk, when a number of Komodo's teammates leave to battle the Hulk, Komodo chooses to follow orders and stay put. Komodo befriends fellow trainee Hardball, allowing him to see her human form.

When Komodo completes her Initiative training, she is assigned to Arizona as part of the Desert Stars team. In "Secret Invasion", a Skrull infiltrates the Desert Stars posing as team member Blacksmith. Komodo leaves with 3-D Man and the Skrull Kill Krew to find Skrull infiltrators on the other Initiative teams.

Komodo joins up with a new version of the Shadow Initiative to retake the Negative Zone prison where Hardball was incarcerated, as it had been conquered by aliens. During the battle, Komodo allows herself to be injured. The Shadow Initiative retakes the prison, albeit with the loss of several new members; the survivors realize that Norman Osborn intended for the team to be expendable.

When Hardball joins the Initiative, Komodo chooses to quit rather than be on the same team as him. She has her powers removed via S.P.I.N. technology, which leaves her crippled once more. In the aftermath of Siege, Cloud 9 and Hardball give Komodo a formula that neutralizes the S.P.I.N. technology and restores her powers.

== Powers and abilities ==
The first Komodo possesses a strong, scaly hide, enhanced strength, the ability to breathe flame, and a powerful tail which he can use in combat. While in Wundagore, he flew an Atomic Steed.

The second Komodo possesses an accelerated healing factor derived from the same serum created by Curt Connors that turned him into the Lizard. She possesses superhuman physical abilities, a healing factor that enables her to regrow limbs, and powerful claws. Unlike Connors, she maintains her human mind while in her lizard form and has the ability to control transformations between human and lizard forms. This is a result of her being able to perfect the formula to her DNA.

== In other media ==
The Melati Kusuma incarnation of Komodo appears as a playable character in Lego Marvel's Avengers.
