= Henry Peter Gyrich =

Fictional character appearing in Marvel Comics

Publication information
- Publisher: Marvel Comics
- First appearance: The Avengers #165 (November 1977)
- Created by: Jim Shooter (writer); John Byrne (penciller)

In-story information
- Species: Human
- Team affiliations: Avengers; S.W.O.R.D.; The Initiative; U.S. Superhuman Armed Forces Department; Commission on Superhuman Activities; Office of the Chief of Protocol; National Security Agency; National Security Council; Operation: Zero Tolerance; Project Wideawake; Thunderbolts
- Notable aliases: Secretary Gyrich, Bad News Pete

Henry Peter Gyrich (/ˈɡaɪrɪk/) is a fictional character appearing in American comic books published by Marvel Comics. He is a liaison of the United States government who is often opposed to the superhuman community.

The character was portrayed by Matthew Sharp in the live-action feature film X-Men (2000). In animation, the character has been voiced by Barry Flatman, Don Brown, and Jim Ward.

== Publication history ==
The character first appeared in The Avengers #165 (November 1977) and was created by writer Jim Shooter and penciller John Byrne.

== Fictional character biography ==
=== Liaison ===
Henry Gyrich is the first person to be given the title of US Government liaison to the Avengers by the National Security Agency later by the National Security Council. During his tenure, Gyrich revokes the Avengers' priority status after taking issue. The Avengers have to accept Gyrich's "suggestions" or have their Quinjets and other sensitive equipment confiscated. He limits the Avengers' active membership to seven members, forces the Falcon to join unwillingly to fill an affirmative action quota Gyrich sets, and installs various security measures for the team. Gyrich also takes part in a Senate investigation involving the Avengers which claims the team are threats to national security. When the investigation ends, the Senate committee gives the Avengers new guidelines and designates Raymond Sikorski as Gyrich's successor.

Gyrich is a member of the Commission on Superhuman Activities (CSA), the oversight body on superhuman activities in the United States; he is part of the team that forces Captain America to resign. Gyrich also takes part as a special consultant in Project Wideawake, a program dedicated to capturing mutants.

=== Political exploits ===
After Onslaught's events, Gyrich's involved in hunting the Hulk and harasses Rick Jones, Betty Banner, Thunderbolt Ross and Doc Samson while doing so. During this time, writer Peter David attempted to humanize the character with a backstory which touched upon his family life, revealing his father died of Alzheimer's disease and that Gyrich took a year off work to care for him.

Gyrich is promoted to be Valerie Cooper's successor as the CSA's head. He uses Commission resources and remolds the vigilante Jack Monroe into the assassin Scourge in an attempt to kill all of Earth's superhumans, but is stopped by the Thunderbolts. Gyrich is reassigned to the US State Department and becomes the Avengers' liaison to the United Nations. He leaves the position after the United Nations' relationship with the Avengers ends.

Following the Civil War storyline, Gyrich becomes the Secretary of the Superhuman Armed Forces. His base of operations is the superhuman training facility in Stamford, Connecticut. It is under his orders that Gauntlet is drafted as the facility's drill instructor, after Gauntlet saves him from an attack by Hydra in Iraq. Gyrich gives orders to cover up MVP's death, and secretly conspires with Baron Von Blitzschlag involving illegal cloning despite Hank Pym's objections. He makes arrangements for Danielle Moonstar to tutor Trauma. However, Gyrich fires Moonstar for training Trauma to use his ability to transform into the worst fears of others to help people with debilitating phobias instead of using these abilities as a weapon. Gyrich is removed from his position after getting into a heated argument with Iron Man.

Following the Secret Invasion storyline, Gyrich is the main antagonist for Kieron Gillen and Steven Sander's series S.W.O.R.D., where he joins the eponymous group alongside Abigail Brand. Gyrich kidnaps several aliens, including Noh-Varr, Adam X, Jazinda, Karolina Dean, and Hepzibah, and arrests Brand and Lockheed. Gyrich is berated by Norman Osborn and arrested by Sydren.

During the Civil War II storyline, Gyrich represents the United States as a member of Alpha Flight's board of governors. He also appears with Alpha Flight in The Immortal Hulk, where he enlists the U-Foes to go after the Hulk.

During the Krakoan Age, Gyrich initiates a plan to discredit the mutant nation Krakoa. He recruits Wiz Kid as a mole for Orchis and the Guardian as support with an assassination attempt on Shi'ar empress Xandra. However, Abigail Brand shoots Gyrich out of an airlock, sending him to die in space and making his death appear to be a suicide.

== Other versions ==
- An alternate universe version of Henry Peter Gyrich appears in Age of Apocalypse. Following a failed attempt to destroy Angel's club, Heaven, he loses his legs amidst "the offensive to blow the Seattle power core" and becomes the leader of a human resistance movement against Apocalypse.
- An alternate universe version of Henry Peter Gyrich appears in Mutant X #26. This version is a government liaison to the Avengers who displays animosity towards Captain America.
- An alternate universe version of Henry Peter Gyrich appears in Ultimate Spider-Man. This version works for an FBI strike team. Additionally, a clone who works for the CIA to establish oversight on Nick Fury and the Ultimates appears as well.
- An alternate universe version of Henry Peter Gyrich appears in What If...? (vol. 2) #30. Under the President's orders, he attempts to assassinate Mary Richards during her presidential campaign by disguising himself as Captain America, only to be thwarted by Richards and the Thing and confronted by the real Captain America.

== In other media ==
=== Television ===
- Henry Gyrich appears in X-Men: The Animated Series, voiced by Barry Flatman. This version displays a vendetta against the X-Men. Throughout the first season, he works with Bolivar Trask to oversee the Sentinels' production until Master Mold betrays the two. In the series finale "Graduation Day", Gyrich speaks at an anti-mutant summit and attacks Professor X with a sonic gun before being taken away by security.
  - Henry Gyrich appears in the first season of X-Men '97, voiced by Todd Haberkorn. He has been imprisoned in Ryker's Island, but he later breaks out of prison before he is killed by Bastion.
- Henry Gyrich appears in the Fantastic Four: World's Greatest Heroes episode "Imperious Rex", voiced by Don Brown.
- Henry Gyrich appears in The Avengers: Earth's Mightiest Heroes, voiced by Jim Ward. This version is the U.S. government supervisor of S.W.O.R.D.

=== Film ===
Henry Guyrich appears in X-Men (2000), portrayed by Matthew Sharp. This version is Senator Robert Kelly's assistant who is killed by the Brotherhood of Mutants and replaced by Mystique.
