= U-Foes =

Supervillain team

- Cover to Marvel Adventures: The Avengers by Sean Chen

Publication information
- Publisher: Marvel Comics
- First appearance: The Incredible Hulk #254 (December 1980)
- Created by: Bill Mantlo; Sal Buscema

In-story information
- Member(s): Ironclad; Vapor; Vector; X-Ray

The U-Foes is a supervillain team appearing in American comic books published by Marvel Comics, usually as enemies of the Hulk. The group consists of four members: Vector, the group's leader, who can repel matter telekinetically; Vapor, who can transform into any form of gaseous matter; X-Ray, who can generate and project radiation and fly; and Ironclad, who has a metallic body and can control his density.

== Publication history ==
The U-Foes first appeared in The Incredible Hulk (vol. 2) #254 (Dec. 1980) and were created by Bill Mantlo and Sal Buscema. Per The Incredible Hulk (vol. 2) #254's credits, editor Al Milgrom designed the costumes of the U-Foes, while editor-in-chief Jim Shooter helped with the names of the U-Foes.

As noted on the first page of that issue, the group's name was inspired by the 1979 Graham Parker song "Waiting for the UFOs".

== Fictional team biography ==
Simon Utrecht, a former politician and multi-millionaire, funds an operation to gain superpowers the same way the Fantastic Four had, by flying into space and being exposed to cosmic rays. He chooses three other members to join him: Ann Darnell, her younger brother Jimmy Darnell, and Mike Steel. What the group did not know was that they would be exposed to much higher amounts than the Fantastic Four and that it would most likely kill them. They successfully gain powers, but Bruce Banner brings their ship to safety before they can be killed. Banner transforms into the Hulk and a fight ensues, but the U-Foes lose due to their inexperience with their newly gained powers and inability to fight as a team. In the end, their own ongoing mutations incapacitate them, and the team is scattered as they lose control of their powers.

Some time later, as their powers stabilize, the U-Foes reunite with the goal of revenge and making a name for themselves in the public eye by killing the Hulk. Though they find the Hulk a more formidable foe, with the intelligence of Bruce Banner then in control of the Hulk, X-Ray discovers a way to keep Banner in his human form by generating 'anti-gamma rays'. The U-Foes imprison Banner at the former Gamma Base and hijack television broadcasts worldwide, intending to gain infamy by killing Banner in front of the world. However, Banner is freed by his allies Betty Ross, Rick Jones, and Bereet, and defeats the U-Foes as the Hulk. Ironically, the U-Foes' attempt to gain fame at the Hulk's expense instead reveals to the world that Banner is in control of the Hulk's power. This leads to a brief period of Banner/Hulk as a popular celebrity and superhero, which ends when the Mindless Hulk persona re-asserts itself.

After several defeats at the hands of the Hulk and his allies, each of the U-Foes are banished to another dimension. They manage to reunite and find their way back to Earth when the mutant Portal's powers manifest. The U-Foes attempt to murder Portal to keep him from opening another portal to banish them, but are defeated by the Avengers. They later attempt to kidnap Portal to exploit his mutant powers, and are defeated once again by Captain America, Darkhawk, and Daredevil.

Throughout the 1980s and 1990s, the team generally work alone, but occasionally work as hired hands for other villains. Working for the Leader, they attack the Pantheon, injuring dozens of civilians. Despite the handicap of an orphan girl who had gotten mixed up in the battle, the Hulk and the Pantheon soldiers subdue some of the U-Foes. The villains are tricked into hurting each other. During "Acts of Vengeance", the U-Foes face the West Coast Avengers with the help of Mole Man, but they are defeated.

During the "Civil War" storyline, the Superhuman Registration Act brings the U-Foes to the attention of the United States government. The U.S. sends the Thunderbolts after the U-Foes. After a battle in Portland, the U-Foes are arrested. Instead of due process, they are given the choice of joining the team or facing jail time.

During the "Dark Reign" storyline, the U-Foes are revealed by new Initiative leader Norman Osborn as the new Initiative team for the state of North Carolina. Osborn orders the U-Foes to attack the Heavy Hitters after they secede from the Initiative. They help the other Initiative teams to defeat and capture the Heavy Hitters' leader Prodigy.

The U-Foes play a role in the beginning of "Siege", when Osborn sends them to fight Volstagg. The resulting clash leads to Volstagg being falsely blamed for destroying Soldier Field and killing thousands, and giving Osborn the excuse to start a war with Asgard. With the help of other villains, they bring down Thor after he is attacked by Sentry. When Osborn is defeated, the whole team surrenders and is then incarcerated.

In The Immortal Hulk, Henry Peter Gyrich hires the U-Foes to go after Hulk in exchange for full pardons for their past crimes. When Hulk is hiding in New York City, the U-Foes attack him. The fight is briefly stopped when Vector accidentally sends Hulk flying to New Jersey. When the U-Foes catch up to Hulk, X-Ray attacks him with his anti-gamma rays, which inadvertently transform Hulk into a variation of Red Hulk. Hulk proceeds to badly injure Ironclad and blind Vector using Vapor's sulfuric gas. In a panic, Vector sends Hulk flying to Manhattan. Gyrich reprimands the U-Foes for letting Hulk escape.

== Members ==
=== Vector ===
- Further reading: Vector at the Comic Book DB (archived from the original); Vector at the Grand Comics Database

Vector (Simon Utrecht) is a businessman and politician who funded the U-Foes' space flight in search of power. He possesses flight and telekinesis that enables him to repel and attract matter. By focusing his power into blasts, Vector is capable of flaying skin and muscle and repelling the structure of reality itself.

=== Vapor ===
- Further reading: Vapor at the Comic Book DB (archived from the original); Vapor at the Grand Comics Database

Vapor (Ann Darnell) is an engineer and X-Ray's older sister who was hired to serve as a life-support manager on the space flight. She is able to transform into various forms of gas, primarily lethal poisons. Vapor can only return to her fully human state for brief periods, and is vulnerable to having her gaseous form scattered by strong winds or explosive force.

=== X-Ray ===
- Further reading: X-Ray at the Comic Book DB (archived from the original); X-Ray at the Grand Comics Database

X-Ray (James Darnell) is an engineer and Vapor's younger brother who was hired to serve as a fuel-propulsion engineer on the space flight. His body was transformed into a living energy field that is intangible and immune to most physical harm, although his powers cannot affect lead. X-Ray can expel various forms of heavy radiation in the form of potent blasts, shown capable of hurting even the Hulk, and severely weakening Thor.

=== Ironclad ===
- Further reading: Ironclad at the Comic Book DB (archived from the original); Ironclad at the Grand Comics Database

Ironclad (Michael Steel) is an engineer and pilot who was hired to pilot the space flight. His body was transformed into organic metal, which gives him superhuman strength, durability, and the ability to increase or decrease his own weight. Ironclad's form was initially composed of jagged folds of metal; however, after briefly losing control of his powers and sinking deep into the Earth's crust, he emerged with his body smoothed and polished by friction.

== Other versions ==
A possible future version of Vapor appears in the Maestro miniseries, where she is enlisted by the Maestro to kill Hercules. Once Vapor succeeds, the Maestro freezes her, shatters her, and orders his soldiers to bury the shards to prevent her from regenerating.

== In other media ==
=== Television ===
- The U-Foes appear in The Avengers: Earth's Mightiest Heroes, with Vector voiced by Cam Clarke and Vapor voiced by Colleen O'Shaughnessey while X-Ray and Ironclad have no dialogue.
- The U-Foes appear in a self-titled episode of Avengers Assemble, with Vector voiced by Glenn Steinbaum, Vapor by Catherine Taber, X-Ray by Jeremy Kent Jackson, and Ironclad by Eric Ladin. The space flight that turned this version of the group into the U-Foes was backed by Hydra and they took their group's name from their UFO-like spaceship.

=== Video games ===
- The U-Foes appear in The Incredible Hulk: The Pantheon Saga.
- The U-Foes appear as bosses in The Incredible Hulk, with Vector voiced by S. Scott Bullock, Vapor by Rachael MacFarlane, X-Ray by Keith Ferguson, and Ironclad by Mitch Lewis. The game's version of X-Ray has a skeletal appearance while Vector retains his normal human appearance. Furthermore, they originally intended to duplicate the accident behind the Hulk using atmospheric radiation instead of gamma. Additionally, Ironclad appears as an unlockable skin for the Hulk.
- The U-Foes appear as recurring bosses in Marvel Avengers Alliance.
- X-Ray appears as a playable character in Lego Marvel's Avengers.
