= Gorilla Girl =

Marvel Comics superhero

- Gorilla Girl in her gorilla form, as depicted in Avengers: The Initiative #13 (July 2008). Art by Steve Uy.

Publication information
- Publisher: Marvel Comics
- First appearance: Marvel Team-Up #91 (March 1980)
- Created by: Steven Grant; Pat Broderick

In-story information
- Alter ego: Fahnbullah Eddy
- Team affiliations: The Freaks; Initiative
- Notable aliases: Gorilla Woman
- Abilities: Ability to shapeshift into a super-strong and highly agile gorilla

Gorilla Girl (Fahnbullah Eddy) is a superhero appearing in American comic books published by Marvel Comics. Initially introduced in Marvel Team-Up, Gorilla Girl went on to make minor appearances as a trainee of the Initiative program. Gorilla Girl appeared in the series Marvel Apes alongside Gibbon and an alternate universe version of Speedball, both primate-themed characters.

== Publication history ==
Gorilla Girl first appeared in Marvel Team-Up #91 (March 1980), and was created by Steven Grant and Pat Broderick. She made her first full appearance years later in Marvel Tales #256, which reprinted the Marvel Team-Up story and added a new story featuring her and other circus freaks. She has since appeared in various comics as a member of the Freaks, the Initiative, and Counter Force. She has also crossed over with other Marvel universes, such as Marvel Apes and Marvel Zombies. In her earliest appearances, she was depicted as an adult woman, but in her later appearances, she is implied to be a teenager.

== Fictional character biography ==
Fahnbullah Eddy, originally known as Gorilla Woman, is first seen serving as a carnival attraction as one of the members of a group called the Freaks. She possesses the ability to transform into a gorilla, with the source of her powers never being revealed. In her first incarnation, Eddy's human form is an adult woman. In later appearances, she appears to be much younger and is implied to be a teenager.

After the events of "Civil War", Gorilla Girl is captured by the Thunderbolts. During her capture, she throws Penance down three flights of stairs, after which Penance beats her severely. She later registers with the Initiative and joins Camp Hammond as a trainee.

Gorilla Girl befriends the alternate universe simian version of Speedball, another Initiative recruit. She becomes involved in the plan of Norman Osborn to exploit the resources of her friend's home dimension. Gorilla Girl, Speedball, and Gibbon end up in the Marvel Zombies universe via a portal and are attacked by a horde of zombies. The heroes end up being saved by the heroes of the Marvel Apes universe, who have also crossed universes. Ape-X plans to destroy the portal, but Gorilla Girl attacks him to go in his place. Using the Wrencher's wrench, Gorilla Girl attacks the simian heroes and destroys the portal, setting time right.

== Powers and abilities ==
Fahnbullah Eddy can shapeshift into a gorilla but maintaining her human mind and speech capability.

== In other media ==
Gorilla Girl appears as a playable character in Lego Marvel's Avengers, voiced by Cherise Boothe.
