= Gauntlet (Joseph Green) =

- Gauntlet as depicted in Avengers: The Initiative #1 (June 2007). Art by Stefano Caselli.

Publication information
- Publisher: Marvel Comics
- First appearance: She-Hulk (vol. 2) #3 (January 2006)
- Created by: Dan Slott; Stefano Caselli; Eric Powell

In-story information
- Alter ego: Joseph Green
- Team affiliations: Avengers Resistance; The Initiative; United States Army; New Warriors; Force Works
- Abilities: Right hand controls large, robotic gauntlet. Allows for projection of energy "hand".

The Gauntlet (Joseph Green) is a superhero appearing in American comic books published by Marvel Comics.

== Publication history ==
Gauntlet made his first appearance in She-Hulk #100 and was created by Dan Slott, Stefano Caselli and Eric Powell. He was not referred to by name until the first issue of Avengers: The Initiative. His origin was revealed in the 2007 Avengers: The Initiative Annual.

== Fictional character biography ==
Two aliens of unknown origin–one fully armored, the other multi-limbed—were killed after entering Earth's atmosphere during a battle, with their weapons being scattered across Earth's surface. The US government tracks the crash site of two of the weapons to the Middle East, where Sergeant Joseph Green is dispatched to secure the area. On arrival, Green's unit is attacked by Hydra troopers. Green uses the right gauntlet of the alien's armor to defeat them, but is unable to remove the gauntlet. Some time later, Henry Peter Gyrich recruits Green to be a drill sergeant at Camp Hammond.

After the events of World War Hulk, Gauntlet is angered at the many cadets who disobeyed orders to confront the Hulk themselves. He is badly beaten by Slapstick and left with a "NW" (New Warriors) signature on his chest, daubed in his blood. The team had learned of a social movement, indicated by "NW" graffiti, of young people in general defiance of the current power structure. After Gauntlet is incapacitated, Taskmaster takes over his drill instructor duties.

During Gauntlet's coma, Gyrich attempts to equip KIA, a clone of Michael Van Patrick, with the Tactigon. After the weapon successfully bonds with KIA, he is flooded with memories of the original Michael Van Patrick's death, seeking vengeance on those involved. Arriving at Gauntlet's hospital room, KIA is surprised to find Gauntlet's bed empty. Gauntlet's gauntlet takes control of him, forcing him to acquire the sword element of the alien's armor. KIA's attacks cause the gauntlet to lose its control over Gauntlet, causing him to revert to normal.

Following the events of "Secret Invasion", Gauntlet is placed in charge of Camp Hammond. Many of the other instructors left, unwilling to place themselves under Norman Osborn's control. Hank Pym declines to be a part of the Initiative, leaving Gauntlet to reluctantly assume the position.

When Osborn threatens to take Gauntlet's arm, Gauntlet escapes and joins the Avengers Resistance. His wife pretends to be ashamed of him for abandoning his family, so that she will not be harassed when he is not there to protect her. As Osborn's regime ends following the Siege of Asgard, Gauntlet is sent to Afghanistan.

During the Iron Man 2020 event, Gauntlet joins Force Works. In the "Reckoning War" storyline, he is attacked by Cormorant, who removes his gauntlet as part of his plan to reassemble the Gauntlet Armor.
