= Teen Brigade =

Fictional comic book group

The Teen Brigade is the name of three teams appearing in American comic books published by Marvel Comics.

The first two teams were recruited by Rick Jones from young amateur radio enthusiasts to obtain and divulge strategic information about safety hazards, usually involving the Hulk. The first group was founded in The Incredible Hulk #6 (March 1963). In modern times, they have largely fallen into obscurity.

== Overview ==
The rationale for creating such teams was that with their help Rick Jones could reach the Hulk (and occasionally other people or events of interest) faster, possibly in time to help him avoid fights or other incidents that could bring the Hulk trouble.

The first Teen Brigade was formed by Rick in The Incredible Hulk #6 (March 1963), and they helped build a weapon for the Hulk to defeat the Metal Master. The group played a role in the origin of the Avengers in The Avengers #1, as their radio transmission brought the original Avengers (Thor, Iron Man, Wasp, and Ant-Man) together to fight the Hulk. The Avengers and the Fantastic Four were a part of keeping Hulk in check, as well as the Teen Brigade. In The Avengers #2 (November 1963), they called Giant-Man to help defeat a Space Phantom. They contacted the Avengers to notify them about the whereabouts of the Hulk in The Avengers #3 (January 1964). In The Avengers #4 (March 1964), the team helped Rick and Captain America track down a villain who turned the Avengers into stone. They later freed the Avengers after Kang the Conqueror captured them.

The second Teen Brigade was assembled when the Hulk was under the Corruptor's control. In a parallel to the Avengers' origin, the Corruptor's equipment interfered with a transmission meant for the Avengers and instead reached a handful of southwestern superheroes, leading to the creation of the Rangers.

The Teen Brigade was mentioned as an inspiration by Captain America when he decided to create an online network in stories published in the early 1990s.

A third incarnation of the Teen Brigade appears in the 2011 series Vengeance, consisting of Barnell Bohusk, Angel Salvadore, the In-Betweener, America Chavez, and the Ultimate Nullifier.
