= Texas Twister =

- Texas Twister as depicted in Fantastic Four #177 (December 1975). Art by George Pérez.

Publication information
- Publisher: Marvel Comics
- First appearance: Fantastic Four #177 (December 1976)
- Created by: Roy Thomas (writer); George Pérez (penciller)

In-story information
- Full name: Drew Daniels
- Team affiliations: The Rangers; Thunderbolts; S.H.I.E.L.D.
- Abilities: Superhuman reflexes Enhanced eyesight High degree of resistance to dizziness and motion sickness Wind manipulation Expert rodeo rider, lasso thrower, and sharpshooter

Texas Twister is a superhero appearing in American comic books published by Marvel Comics. The character was created by writer Roy Thomas and penciller George Pérez and first appeared in Fantastic Four #177 (December 1976). He was a S.H.I.E.L.D. Super-Agent and is a member of the Rangers, the American Southwest superhero team.

== Publication history ==
Texas Twister first appeared in Fantastic Four #177 (December 1976), and was created by writer Roy Thomas and penciller George Pérez. One year later, with writer Don Glut and penciller John Buscema, Roy Thomas further developed his creation in Captain America #217 (January 1978). Texas Twister became a member of S.H.I.E.L.D. Super-Agents. This team was also depicted in the next issue of Captain America written by Don Glut and drawn by Sal Buscema. Writers Roger Slifer and Len Wein used the cowboy character and made him an opponent of the Human Torch in Fantastic Four #192 (March 1978). The issue was drawn by his cocreator George Pérez. The S.H.I.E.L.D. Super-Agents reappeared in Captain America #228-229 (December 1978 - January 1979), written by Roger McKenzie and drawn by Sal Buscema. Texas Twister appeared in a flashback in the story "Aftermath" published in Captain America #231 (March 1979).

In the story "You Get What You Need!" published in The Incredible Hulk (vol. 2) #265 (November 1981), Bill Mantlo and Sal Buscema created the superhero team Rangers. In addition to Texas Twister, the team consists of western characters Shooting Star, Firebird, the Phantom Rider (Hamilton Slade, then called Night Rider), and the contemporary Red Wolf. Along many superheroes, Texas Twister appeared in the three-issue comic book limited series Marvel Super Hero Contest of Champions (June–August 1982). The series was written by Mark Gruenwald with art by John Romita, Jr. and Bob Layton. The Rangers appeared in The Incredible Hulk (vol. 2) #279 (January 1983) written by Bill Mantlo.

Texas Twister has been identified as one of the 142 registered superheroes who appear on the cover of the comic book Avengers: The Initiative #1 (June 2007). The character appeared in the issues 1, 2 and 19 of this series.

In 2012, writer Chris Yost chose the Texas team the Rangers to come into conflict with Houston's new superhero Scarlet Spider in the story "The Second Master" in Scarlet Spider #7-9. In an interview with Comic Book Resources, at a question about the antagonists in the story, Chris Yost answered "You'll also be seeing a well known super-hero group from the American southwest named -- wait for it -- The Rangers! Texas Twister! Shooting Star! Red Wolf! Living Lightning! Firebird! Even a new hero or two! And spoiler alert -- Scarlet Spider will fight them.".

Texas Twister has entries in the Official Handbook of the Marvel Universe #11, OHOTMU Deluxe Edition #13, the OHOTMU Master Edition, All-New OHOTMU Update #4 and has a partial entry in Civil War Files.

== Fictional character biography ==
Drew Daniels was born in Amarillo, Texas. He is working as a cattle hand at a ranch when a tornado and radiation from a nearby nuclear reactor affect him at the same time. The net effect was to give him the power to generate tornadoes at will. Calling himself Texas Twister, he answers a newspaper ad placed by the Wizard to fill a vacancy in the Frightful Four. When he discovers they would not pay him to join, Twister declined membership.

He instead accepts the offer to join the Super-Agent program being developed by S.H.I.E.L.D. When he tries out for the program, he spars with Captain America. He entered a cross-country car race with the Human Torch, and scouted him out for the program. He was later seen sparring with Captain America again; however, two of the four super-agent trainees, Blue Streak and the Vamp, turn out to be traitors, so the Texas Twister quits and the program was disbanded.

Twister decides to use his powers to earn a living and joined Cody's Rodeo Extravaganza as a rodeo performer. There he meets Shooting Star, who would become his partner both professionally and personally. Trying to garner publicity for themselves, Star and Twister answer a summons from Rick Jones, seeking the help of the Avengers in containing a rampage by the Hulk. The pair meet up with Firebird, Night Rider, and Red Wolf, and after they rescued Rick from the Corruptor, the five decided to continue to work together as the team of adventurers known as the Rangers. Texas Twister was abducted to take part in the original "Contest of Champions", but wound up being one of the heroes left behind in the arena to watch.

Shooting Star's identity was at some point taken over by a demon named Riglevio in the employ of Master Pandemonium, who believed Firebird to be one of the possessors of his fragmented soul. To keep the Rangers from meeting regularly and perhaps posing a threat to him before he had completed his study of Firebird, Pandemonium dispatches the demon to take Shooting Star's place. Firebird nevertheless believed the demon to be hiding among the Avengers' West Coast branch and with her guidance the Rangers confronted the heroes. This serves to bring the demon out of hiding. The demon claims that Shooting Star was a human guise it had taken long before, and that there never was a Victoria Star. The Avengers imprisoned the demon at their Compound and began an investigation of Master Pandemonium. For his own unrevealed reasons, the Texas Twister did not accompany them. Phantom Rider helped him try to summon a demon to help him get revenge, but instead they summoned Arkon who sought to attack the Avengers.

Soon, however, Texas Twister returns to the Avengers Compound at a time when Hawkeye was alone, demanding to see the captive demon. Twister declares his love for the demon, which turns back into Shooting Star. Texas Twister went on to explain that the demon had come to him months ago when Twister's powers seemed to be fading, making him afraid that he'd lose Shooting Star if their rodeo act broke up on account of his lost powers. The demon offered to augment the Twister's powers in exchange for his soul, and the Twister agreed, but after his powers were restored he begged to be spared. The demon then takes over Shooting Star instead. The demon proceeds to cast a spell that prevents Twister from telling anyone about this. The spell did not prevent Twister from researching the occult on his own; this is how he finds a way to break the demon's original spell. After exorcising the demon from Shooting Star, the demon then possesses Twister himself and battles Hawkeye and Shooting Star. Ultimately, Star threatens to kill the demon rather than allow the possession to continue, and the demon reluctantly imprisons itself in a statue. Texas Twister and Shooting Star are finally reunited.

The supervillain Graviton tried to take over the world and suspended many heroes in the air using his powers. Texas Twister, along with the rest of the Rangers, were among them. The Thunderbolts defeated Graviton and the heroes returned to the ground. Texas Twister later fought Southpaw in Texas.

During the Civil War storyline, Texas Twister was recruited by the Thunderbolts to help round up un-registered superheroes as a way of working off the public properties he accidentally destroyed when he was drunk. He was placed as leader of the Beta Squad of the Thunderbolts Army, covering the Los Angeles area.

Weeks after the conclusion to the Civil War event, Texas Twister was seen as a member of Texas' new government-sponsored superhero team, the revived Rangers, as part of the 50 States Initiative Program. Using a floating base called a 'Terrorcarrier', Hydra attacks Crawford, Texas, a vacation spot for President George W. Bush. He and his fellow Rangers join a large group of heroes in attacking the carrier. Twister is injured in the firefight. The carrier is destroyed and the President is unharmed.

During the Secret Invasion storyline, Texas Twister was with the Rangers when they, Delroy Garrett / 3-D Man, and Eric O'Grady / Ant-Man were fighting a Skrull that was posing as Lobo, Red Wolf's wolf. The Rangers come into conflict with Kaine in Houston, then they joined forces with him to battle a monster made of pure energy.

During the Secret Empire storyline, Texas Twister joins the Underground when Hydra takes over the United States.

== Powers and abilities ==
Thanks to bombardment by radioactive particles during a tornado, Texas Twister has the psychokinetic ability to accelerate air molecules to high velocity, thereby creating a tornado-like mass of swirling wind around him. Although he usually creates the tornado with himself at the center, he can create tornadoes up to 100 feet (30 m) away from his body. He can control the size of the tornado at will and can create a tornado 200 feet (61 m) in diameter with outer winds moving at speeds up to 225 mph (362 km/h). Such a wind swirling about his body is capable of lifting him off the ground and supporting him in midair. He has superhuman reflexes, and various abilities enabling him to withstand the rigors of motion inside a tornado, such as denser skin to prevent unwanted heat loss, friction burns, and particle abrasions, enhanced eyesight, and a high degree of resistance to dizziness and motion sickness.

Texas Twister is an expert rodeo rider, lasso thrower, and sharpshooter. He has also undergone S.H.I.E.L.D. unarmed combat training.

== In other media ==
Texas Twister makes a non-speaking cameo appearance in the Fantastic Four: World's Greatest Heroes episode "The Cure" as a failed applicant to the Fantastic Four.
