= Rangers (comics) =

Fictional comic book group

- The Rangers. Art by Steve McNiven.

Publication information
- Publisher: Marvel Comics
- First appearance: The Incredible Hulk (vol. 2) #265, (November 1981)
- Created by: Bill Mantlo (writer); Sal Buscema (penciller)

In-story information
- Base(s): Texas
- Member(s): Firebird; Living Lightning; Fifty-One; Red Wolf; Shooting Star; Texas Twister

The Rangers are a fictional superhero team appearing in American comic books published by Marvel Comics. The team first appeared in The Incredible Hulk (vol. 2) #265 (November 1981) and was created by writer Bill Mantlo and penciller Sal Buscema. The title page of The Incredible Hulk (vol. 2) #265 also credits Mark Gruenwald with co-creation of The Rangers.

Team members usually hail from Arizona, New Mexico, or Texas.

== Publication history ==
In the story "You Get What You Need!" published in Incredible Hulk (vol. 2) #265 (November 1981), writer Bill Mantlo, penciller Sal Buscema, and Mark Gruenwald created the superhero team Rangers. The team consists of western characters Firebird, Shooting Star, Texas Twister, the Phantom Rider (Hamilton Slade, then called Night Rider), and the contemporary Red Wolf.

The members of the team have been identified in the 142 registered superheroes who appear on the cover of the comic book Avengers: The Initiative #1 (June 2007).

== Fictional team biography ==
Incredible Hulk (vol. 2) #265, artist Al Milgrom

The Rangers began by accident. Rick Jones was being held captive by the villainous Corruptor, who had the Hulk under his influence. Rick sent a shortwave radio message to attempt to contact the Avengers. The message never reached the Avengers, but instead five individuals intercepted the message and responded: Shooting Star and Texas Twister, Firebird, the Phantom Rider, and the contemporary Red Wolf.

Although the five Southwestern adventurers were unable to stop the Hulk's rampage, they did enable him to defeat the Corruptor. At the battle's end, Texas Twister suggested that the five of them get together whenever a threat to the Southwest crops up. They agreed and took the collective name of the Rangers. However, because of the geographical separation among the members, they rarely acted as a team. Additionally, Shooting Star was revealed to be possessed by a demon at the next meeting of the team and the demon had acted against the team meeting.

Shooting Star's identity was at some point taken over by an unnamed demon in the employ of Master Pandemonium, who believed Firebird to be one of the possessors of his fragmented soul. To keep the Rangers from meeting regularly and perhaps posing a threat to him before he had completed his study of Firebird, Pandemonium dispatched the demon to take Shooting Star's place. Firebird nevertheless believed the demon to be hiding among the Avengers' West Coast branch and with her guidance the Rangers confronted the heroes, only to flush the demon in Shooting Star out of hiding. The demon claimed that Shooting Star was a human guise it had taken long before, that there never was a Victoria Star. The Avengers imprisoned the demon at their Compound and began an investigation of Master Pandemonium, but the Texas Twister, demonstrating a curious lack of concern, did not accompany them. Soon, however, Texas Twister returned to the Avengers Compound at a time when Hawkeye was alone, demanding to see the captive demon. Twister declared his love for the demon, which turned back into Shooting Star. Texas Twister went on to explain that the demon had come to him months ago when Twister's powers seemed to be fading, making him afraid that he would lose Shooting Star if their rodeo act broke up on account of his lost powers. The demon offered to augment the Twister's powers in exchange for his soul, and the Twister agreed, but after his powers were restored he begged to be spared, so the demon possessed Shooting Star instead, casting a spell that prevented Twister from telling anyone about this. Twister studied the occult until he found a means to expel the demon from Star. The demon then possessed Twister himself and battled Hawkeye and Shooting Star. Ultimately, Star threatened to kill the demon rather than allow the possession to continue, and the demon reluctantly imprisoned itself in a statue. Texas Twister and Shooting Star were reunited.

The Rangers next appear as a team towards the end of the Civil War storyline, in which it seems they have been reformed as the state superteam for Texas. The original five members are joined by Armadillo, a reformed supervillain, and Living Lightning, a former Avenger. Armadillo later quits and joins the Hood's crime syndicate, though it is possible he later rejoined the team after several of the villainous members of the team were recruited to pose as heroes in Taskmaster's Initiative. The Rangers next assist in protecting the President from Hydra's attack. There are injuries but no fatalities.

During the Secret Invasion storyline, the Rangers are seen battling a Skrull who had been impersonating Red Wolf's wolf Lobo. They come into conflict with Kaine alias Scarlet Spider in Houston, then they joined forces with him to battle a monster made of pure energy.

== Membership ==
=== Founding members ===
- Firebird – Bonita Juarez is a pyrokinetic and may be immortal.
- Phantom Rider – Hamilton Slade is the latest Phantom Rider.
- Red Wolf – William Talltrees imbued with the spiritual legacy of Owayodota.
- Shooting Star – Victoria Star uses a pair of specially designed "star shooters".
- Texas Twister – Drew Daniels has the psychokinetic ability to form tornadoes.

=== Post-Civil War recruits ===
- Armadillo – Antonio Rodriguez is a mutate given super strength and durability by Karl Malus.
- Living Lightning – Miguel Santos is an electrical manipulator.
- Fifty-One – Alien telepath.
