= Shooting Star (comics) =

- The Incredible Hulk (vol. 2) #265; Art by Sal Buscema

Publication information
- Publisher: Marvel Comics
- First appearance: The Incredible Hulk (vol. 2) #265 (November 1981)
- Created by: Bill Mantlo (writer); Sal Buscema (penciller)

In-story information
- Alter ego: Victoria Star
- Species: Human
- Team affiliations: The Rangers
- Partnerships: Texas Twister
- Abilities: Expert markswoman and rodeo rider; Wears specially-designed "star shooters" and boots which contain miniature gyroscopes

Shooting Star is a superhero appearing in American comic books published by Marvel Comics. Created by writer Bill Mantlo and penciller Sal Buscema, the character first appeared in Incredible Hulk (vol. 2) #265 (November 1981). She is a member of the Rangers, the American Southwest superhero team.

== Publication history ==
Writer Bill Mantlo and penciller Sal Buscema created the superheroine Shooting Star and the superhero team the Rangers, and both first appeared in the story "You Get What You Need!" published in Incredible Hulk (vol. 2) #265 (November 1981). In addition to their new character, the team consists of western characters Firebird, Texas Twister, the Phantom Rider (Hamilton Slade, then called Night Rider), and the contemporary Red Wolf. The next year, she appeared in the third issue of Marvel Super Hero Contest of Champions along with his colleague Texas Twister.

Shooting Star has been identified as one of the 142 registered superheroes who appear on the cover of the comic book Avengers: The Initiative #1. The character appeared in the issues #2 and #19 of this series.

In 2012, writer Chris Yost chose the Texas team the Rangers to come into conflict with Houston's new superhero Scarlet Spider in the story "The Second Master" in Scarlet Spider #7-9. In an interview with Comic Book Resources, at a question about the antagonists in the story, Chris Yost answered: "You'll also be seeing a well known super-hero group from the American southwest named -- wait for it -- The Rangers! Texas Twister! Shooting Star! Red Wolf! Living Lightning! Firebird! Even a new hero or two! And spoiler alert -- Scarlet Spider will fight them".

Shooting Star has entries in the Official Handbook of the Marvel Universe #10, OHOTMU Deluxe Edition #11 and Official Handbook of the Marvel Universe A To Z Update #2 (2010).

== Fictional character biography ==
=== Origins ===
Shooting Star was born Victoria Starwin, in El Paso, Texas. She is the daughter of Remington Starwin, a wealthy Texas oil baron and amateur rodeo performer. When she was a child, her father encouraged his daughter's aspirations to perform professionally in rodeos. He hired scientists to build for her a special six-shooter that shoots star-shaped paralysis pellets for her sharp-shooting act. At some point in her performing career, she met a rodeo performer and former superhuman adventurer, the Texas Twister, and the two formed a dual act. Her father then had scientists design a pair of jet-boots that enabled her to stabilize her flight when swept up in the Twister's cyclonic vortex.

=== Rangers ===
Shooting Star and Texas Twister were the star attractions at Cody's Rodeo Extravaganza when they intercepted a shortwave radio message sent by Rick Jones meant for the Avengers. Jones was being held captive by the villainous Corruptor, who had the Hulk under his influence. Shooting Star and Texas Twister went to answer the distress call and discovered that three other individuals had responded as well — Firebird, Phantom Rider, and Red Wolf. Although the five Southwestern adventurers were unable to stop the Hulk's rampage, they did enable him to defeat the Corruptor. At the battle's end, Texas Twister suggested that the five of them get together whenever a threat to the Southwest crops up. They agreed and took the collective name of the Rangers. However, because of the geographical separation among the members, the first incarnation of the Rangers did not last long.

Shooting Star's identity was at some point taken over by a demon named Riglevio in the employ of Master Pandemonium, who believed Firebird to be one of the possessors of his fragmented soul. To keep the Rangers from meeting regularly and perhaps posing a threat to him before he had completed his study of Firebird, Pandemonium dispatched the demon to take Shooting Star's place. Firebird nevertheless believed the demon to be hiding among the Avengers' West Coast branch and with her guidance the Rangers confronted the heroes, only to flush the demon in Shooting Star out of hiding. The demon claimed that Shooting Star was a human guise it had taken long before, that there never was a Victoria Star. The Avengers imprisoned the demon at their Compound and began an investigation of Master Pandemonium, but the Texas Twister, demonstrating a curious lack of concern, did not accompany them.

Soon, however, Texas Twister returned to the Avengers Compound at a time when Hawkeye was alone, demanding to see the captive demon. Twister declared his love for the demon, which turned back into Shooting Star. Texas Twister went on to explain that the demon had come to him months ago when Twister's powers seemed to be fading, making him afraid that he'd lose Shooting Star if their rodeo act broke up on account of his lost powers. The demon offered to augment the Twister's powers in exchange for his soul, and the Twister agreed, but after his powers were restored he begged to be spared, so the demon possessed Shooting Star instead, casting a spell that prevented Twister from telling anyone about this. Twister studied the occult until he found a means to expel the demon from Star. The demon then possessed Twister himself and battled Hawkeye and Shooting Star. Ultimately, Star threatened to kill the demon rather than allow the possession to continue, and the demon reluctantly imprisoned itself in a statue. Texas Twister and Shooting Star were reunited.

=== Initiative/Secret Invasion ===
After the "Civil War" event, as a registered hero, Victoria Starwin trained at Camp Hammond, before becoming a member of Texas' new government-sponsored superhero team, the Rangers. Using a floating base called a 'Terrorcarrier', Hydra attacks Crawford, Texas, a vacation spot for George W. Bush. Shooting Star is seen attempting to convince the President to leave his home and get to cover away from the Hydra attack, but he refuses, saying he has faith in the Initiative. The superheroine and her fellow Rangers join a large group of heroes in attacking the carrier which is destroyed and the President is unharmed.

Shooting Star later helps the Initiative repel the Skrull invasion. She begins to succumb to a lethal gas used by the Skrull impersonating Yellowjacket, but is saved by Whiz Kid and recovers.

The Rangers come into conflict with Kaine, the Scarlet Spider, in Houston, then they joined forces with him to battle a monster made of pure energy.

== Powers and abilities ==
Shooting Star has no known superhuman powers, although in her initial appearance she claimed to have "stellar powers." She is an expert markswoman and rodeo rider. Shooting Star wears a pair of specially designed "star shooters", which look like six-shooters but which actually shoot projectiles made of an unknown material, shaped like five-pointed stars. The stars paralyze living beings they hit, with one star capable of paralyzing a 6-foot-tall (1.8 m) man for approximately 30 minutes. She wears boots which contain miniature gyroscopes, which keep her oriented correctly as she rides the winds generated by Texas Twister.

== Reception ==
Deirdre Kaye of Scary Mommy called Shooting Star a "role model" and "truly heroic."

== Other versions ==
In Fantastic Four Big Town, Shooting Star is a blonde superhero created by Professor X and Hank Pym. Her real name is "Vicki" and she possesses flight and energy powers which manifest as glowing circles around her hands.
