= Red Wolf (comics) =

Publication information
- Publisher: Marvel Comics
- First appearance: (Talltrees); Avengers #80 (September 1970) (Wakely); Marvel Spotlight #1 (November 1971) (Thunderhead); Red Wolf #7 (May 1973) (Wildrun); Fantastic Four Annual #25 (October 1992)
- Created by: (Talltrees); Roy Thomas; John Buscema (Wakely-Thunderhead); Gardner Fox; Syd Shores (Wildrun); Mark Gruenwald; Herb Trimpe

In-story information
- Alter ego: Wildrun; Johnny Wakely; Thomas Thunderhead; William Talltrees
- Team affiliations: (Wildrun); The Anachronauts (Wakely); The Sensational Seven (Talltrees); The Rangers
- Notable aliases: (Talltrees); Owayodata
- Abilities: (Talltrees); Highly skilled hand-to-hand combatant Experienced wrestler Adept combat gymnast Superb archer Expert marksman with throwing weapons and tracker Skilled animal trainer Superhuman strength and sensory acuity

Red Wolf is a superhero identity used by several fictional characters appearing in American comic books published by Marvel Comics. Those who assume the identity are Native American heroes with mystical powers and a trusted wolf companion named Lobo.

== Publication history ==
Red Wolf is one of the first Native American superheroes introduced by Marvel Comics. The William Talltrees version of Red Wolf first appeared in the story "The Coming of Red Wolf!" published in Avengers #80 (cover-dated Sept. 1970), and was created by Roy Thomas and John Buscema. The character appeared also in the next issue.

Shortly afterward, Marvel editor-in-chief Stan Lee began prominently incorporating minorities and female characters into the Marvel lineup. According to Thomas, he and Lee both wanted Marvel to have a book with a Native American hero, but Lee didn't want it to be a modern-day character. "I guess he was trying to see if he could find a way to get a Western to sell, because everybody in the field wanted to write or draw a Western," Thomas speculated. For this reason, when Red Wolf was given the starring spot in the first issue of the tryout series Marvel Spotlight (cover-dated November 1971), the character in the Red Wolf identity was 19th Century Johnny Wakely instead of the previously introduced Will Talltrees.

Following his successful tryout in Marvel Spotlight, the character became the star of the nine-issue series Red Wolf (May 1972 – Sept. 1973). The stories delved into American Indian culture and were set in the Old West. These adventures featured Johnny Wakely in issues #1–6 and Thomas Thunderhead in #7–9, both Red Wolf predecessors of William Talltrees. The Wakely version appeared in subsequent comic books about the Old West. The Thunderhead version, who lives in the 1970s, was never used again.

In 1976, writer Jenny Blake Isabella made the Talltrees version and the superheroine Tigra a team in Marvel Chillers #3, 5 and 6. In the issue #7, Jim Shooter wrote a story where the two superheroes fought the Super Skrull. Years later, in the story "You Get What You Need!" published in The Incredible Hulk vol. 2, #265 (Nov. 1981), writer Bill Mantlo and penciller Sal Buscema created the superhero team the Rangers, consisting of Western characters Bonita Juarez / Firebird, Victoria Starvin / Shooting Star, Drew Daniels / Texas Twister, Hamilton Slade / Phantom Rider, then called Night Rider, and William Talltrees, the contemporary Red Wolf.

In Fantastic Four Annual #25 (Oct. 1992), writer Mark Gruenwald and penciller Herb Trimpe created the Anachronauts, Kang the Conqueror's personal guard. Among them, there was Wildrun, the first of the Red Wolves. The character appeared in subsequent comic books featuring the Anachronauts until his last appearance in Avengers Forever #3 (February 1999).

The Wakely version of Red Wolf appeared in 2000's Blaze of Glory: The Last Ride of the Western Heroes. John Ostrander, the creator of this comic book series, remade the character as a western vigilante. In 2006, Red Wolf received an entry in the Marvel Westerns: Outlaw Files (June 2006). The same year, writer Karl Kesel and penciller Carmine Di Giandomenico wrote a story on the Wakely version of Red Wolf in Mighty Marvel Western - Western Legends #1 (September 2006).

Johnny Wakely also appeared in 2010's Rawhide Kid: The Sensational Seven. The series includes a mix of actual, real world Western heroes and ones from Marvel continuity. In an interview with Comic Book Resources, writer Ron Zimmerman revealed that Red Wolf and his canine companion Lobo would get a bit of a reinvention in the series. He pointed to Red Wolf as his favorite character in the book, next to Rawhide Kid and expressed an interest in writing a spinoff title starring the character. The writer commented on Red Wolf: "I would liken him a little bit to Hank McCoy. He's incredibly well educated and very articulate. This isn't Tonto. This guy will hopefully read as funny, because he's nothing like any other Native American of that day - other than the fact that he's not crazy about white people. He's a little bit of a racist. But still, he's a hero."

In a 2011 interview, writer Jason Aaron revealed that in his original outline of Astonishing Spider-Man & Wolverine, the title characters would have been stranded in the 15th century where Spider-Man would have started the New World Avengers with Sasquatch, Red Wolf and an Aztec Ghost Rider.

The following year, writer Christopher Yost chose the Texas team the Rangers to come into conflict with Houston's new superhero Scarlet Spider in the story "The Second Master" in Scarlet Spider #7-9.

In 2015, a Red Wolf from an alternate universe of Earth-51920 appears in the series 1872. In this universe, the Marvel heroes lives in a Wild West environment, where Red Wolf became deputy of a town called Timely. After Secret Wars, this Red Wolf was placed in the mainstream Marvel Universe and has a difficult time remembering his past life. He becomes the deputy of a Santa Rosa Police Department, but later agrees to go with Clint Barton on a cross country trip to help those in need and to find out more about himself in the Occupy Avengers book. The 2015 relaunch was developed by S'Klallam artist Jeffrey Veregge.

== Fictional character biography ==
=== Wildrun ===
Wildrun is the Red Wolf of the 19th century in the Wild West. In order for the Cheyenne to have a place to live, he drove the Sioux away from the plains. Kang the Conqueror is the only man to have defeated him in battle. As a result, Wildrun swore loyalty to Kang and became a member of his personal guard, the Anachronauts. In Avengers Forever, Libra, who somehow knows Wildrun, described him as "the first of the Red Wolves."

=== Johnny Wakely ===
Johnny Wakely was the adopted name of a Cheyenne man who was raised from childhood by a white couple in the late 19th century. His adoptive parents were killed by Native Americans in retaliation for the U.S. Army cavalry's massacre of their own people. Some time later, a local land baron tried to buy the Wakely property; when Johnny refused to sell, the land baron's hired guns burned down the house. Trying to find his place in this world, Johnny joined the U.S. Cavalry at Fort Rango as a scout, but although accepted by the commanding officer found himself shunned and despised by the soldiers. While on a scouting mission to find a renegade Indian war party, Johnny's position was accidentally given away. Pursued by the warriors, Wakely stumbled into the burial place of a former warrior known as Red Wolf and was visited by the spirit of a Cheyenne god named Owayodata. He was given the ceremonial garb of the Red Wolf, and the coup stick, his totem of power, and became the first known recorded Red Wolf. Red Wolf used his new-found great skills and prowess to promote peace between the white and Native American peoples. He fought and defeated Ursa the Man Bear and Devil Rider.

Later, Johnny Wakely teamed up with Rawhide Kid, Kid Colt, Doc Holliday, Annie Oakley, Billy the Kid and The Two-Gun Kid to track the villainous Cristo Pike after Pike and his gang kidnap Wyatt and Morgan Earp.

=== Thomas Thunderhead ===
Thomas Thunderhead is the Red Wolf during pre-modern era, 1970s. He helped the police officer Jill Tomahawk. Together, they battled King Cycle and later Clayton Bickford. Red Wolf was also once assisted by Gabriel, Devil Hunter and Dragonfly.

=== William Talltrees ===
William Talltrees is a man born in modern times, born in Wolf Point, Montana. He was the son of Rebecca and Thomas Talltrees, a Cheyenne tribal leader, and grew up hearing tales of the legendary Red Wolf. William witnessed his father being intimidated into selling his property to corrupt businessman Cornelius van Lunt and his enforcer Jason Birch; that night, van Lunt's henchmen killed William's family. William swore vengeance, finding and donning the ceremonial garb of Red Wolf. Owayodata visited him and imbued the young man with his spiritual legacy, granting him superhuman powers. The new Red Wolf found a wolf cub that he named Lobo and trained to be his companion. Following the two criminals back to New York, he was able to gain vengeance on them with the aid of the Avengers.

Alongside Tigra, Red Wolf battled the Super-Skrull and the Rat Pack. Alongside the third Phantom Rider, Firebird, Texas Twister, and Shooting Star, he battled the Hulk, and rescued Rick Jones from the Corruptor. Red Wolf joined these other four heroes as part of the first incarnation of the short-lived superhero team, the Rangers. Alongside the Defenders, Red Wolf battled some trolls. Alongside the Rangers again, Red Wolf battled the West Coast Avengers while under the influence of the demon Riglevio possessing Shooting Star.

It was revealed that Will Talltrees was part of a squad of Marines during the Vietnam War, along with Willie Lincoln, Josh Cooper, Jim Rhodes and others named Fong and Janes. They were part of an attack on a village that resulted in the slaughter of the parents of Bengal. As an adult, Bengal resurfaced to take vengeance on those Marines, but has since turned away from his vendetta. Red Wolf suffered a crisis of faith caused by his defeat at the hands of the Bengal.

Some time later, Red Wolf adopted a new wolf cub. Alongside Doctor Strange and the Black Crow, Red Wolf stopped the Cheyenne pantheon from taking vengeance for the Cheyenne people. Red Wolf later battled false eco-terrorists in the employ of Roxxon Oil Company. They tried to destroy a Roxxon pipeline crossing a Canadian and an American Blackfeet Indian Reservation, as well as to assassinate Mellisa Sparrow Bear, an Indian negotiator.

Weeks after the conclusion to the "Civil War" storyline in 2007, Red Wolf was seen as a member of Texas's new government-sponsored superhero team, the revived Rangers, as part of the Fifty State Initiative Program.

During the 2008 "Secret Invasion" storyline, a Skrull poses as Lobo and attacks Delroy Garrett, Eric O'Grady / Ant-Man, and the Rangers.

== Powers and abilities ==
The wolf spirit Owayodata (a god of the Cheyenne pantheon) granted William Talltrees superhuman strength, and sensory acuity heightened to superhuman levels. He is also a highly skilled hand-to-hand combatant, an experienced wrestler, an adept combat gymnast, a superb archer, and an expert marksman with throwing weapons. He is an experienced tracker and animal trainer. His equipment includes a coup stick, a six-foot wooden staff that can be used as a bow or javelin, as well as a tomahawk, hunting knife, bow, and arrows.

Wildrun displayed no superhuman abilities, but presumably had the same enhanced senses and tracking skills as his successors. His weapons are a bow, dagger and spear. Sometimes, when he was a member of the Anachronauts, he used explosive arrows.

Thomas Thunderhead was able to cause his coup stick and his wolf companion Lobo to appear from nowhere, and Lobo also possessed the power of intangibility.

== Supporting cast ==
Except Wildrun, the three other characters have a wolf companion named Lobo in nearly all their adventures. In Marvel Super-Heroes #2 (1990), William Talltrees used a horse named Ranger.

== Other characters named Red Wolf ==
=== Apache Red Wolf ===
In Rawhide Kid #27 (April 1962), writer Stan Lee and artists Jack Kirby and Dick Ayers introduced an Apache warrior named Red Wolf. This character appeared in the issue's second story, "The Girl, the Gunman, and the Apaches!". Red Wolf and other Apaches attacked a covered wagon and brought back a blonde woman to their camp, and encountered her rescuer, the Rawhide Kid.

=== 24th Century Red Wolf ===
In the story "Red Wolf Stalks the Stars!" published in Hercules vol. 2, #2-4 (April–June 1984), written and pencilled by Bob Layton, the Greek-demigod superhero Hercules adventured with a character named Red Wolf (Rojahn Smythe) in an alternate reality during the 24th century. This Red Wolf has no known connection to the Native American superheroes. The character had come about, Layton later said, when Marvel editor-in-chief Jim Shooter declined to commission a Red Wolf miniseries by Layton, who explained "Red Wolf was another one of those forgotten characters I spoke about — like Hercules. I really wanted to do something fun with that character."

=== 1872 Red Wolf ===
An original, unnamed incarnation of Red Wolf appears in the "Secret Wars" storyline. This version is a Cheyenne from the Battleworld domain of the Valley of Doom, which is made from the remnants of Earth-51920. Following Steve Rogers' death, Red Wolf becomes the sheriff of the town of Timely.

== In other media ==
- The Johnny Wakely incarnation of Red Wolf appears in Lego Marvel Super Heroes 2, voiced by Colin McFarlane.
- Bowen Designs created a Red Wolf Mini-Bust, sculpted by Randy Bowen.
