= Corruptor =

Publication information
- Publisher: Marvel Comics
- First appearance: Nova #4 (Dec. 1976)
- Created by: Marv Wolfman and Sal Buscema

In-story information
- Alter ego: Jackson Day
- Abilities: Ability to release a victim's inhibitions Formerly: Superhuman strength Eye beams Teleportation

The Corruptor (Jackson Day) is a supervillain appearing in American comic books published by Marvel Comics. He has fought Thor and Nova (Richard Rider). His sweat glands release a chemical that overrides the social inhibition center of the brain. He first appeared in Nova #4 (December 1976), and was created by Marv Wolfman and Sal Buscema.

== Publication history ==
The Corruptor first appeared in Nova #4 (December 1976), and was created by Marv Wolfman and Sal Buscema.

The character subsequently appears in Nova #21 (Sept. 1978), The Incredible Hulk #264-265 (Oct.–Nov. 1981), Marvel Comics Presents #32 (Nov. 1989), Nova #10 (Oct. 1994), The Avengers #6 (July 1998), New Avengers #6 (April 2005), Spider-Man: Breakout #1-5 (June–Oct. 2005), The New Warriors #6 (Feb. 2006), Union Jack #1-3 (Nov. 2006-Jan. 2007), The Astonishing Spider-Man #1 (May 2007), New Avengers Annual #2 (Feb. 2008), and Secret Invasion #6 (Nov. 2008) and Wolverine, the Best There Is #1 (Feb. 2011).

The Corruptor received an entry in the original Official Handbook of the Marvel Universe #3, The Official Handbook of the Marvel Universe Deluxe Edition #3, and The All-New Official Handbook to The Marvel Universe A-Z Volume 2.

== Fictional character biography ==
Jackson Day was born in Smyrna, Delaware. An ordinary pharmaceutical factory worker, he was exposed to psychoactive chemicals from a fire, giving him blue skin and the ability to negate the inhibitions of others. Day was soon transferred to the Avengers Mansion for treatment. He escaped, abandoning his wife, and became the head of the criminal Inner Circle. With the Inner Circle, he recruited people in financial straits, supplying financial assistance requiring the victims to commit crimes on his behalf. Corruptor later abandoned the Circle.

Corruptor uses his powers on the Hulk, forcing his friend Rick Jones to summon the Avengers so that the Corruptor could corrupt them as well. Rick's SOS is intercepted by several Western-based heroes: Firebird, Phantom Rider, Red Wolf, Texas Twister, and Shooting Star. The plan is foiled, as the Hulk escapes Corruptor's control and defeats him. The western heroes decide to stay together and form the Rangers.

Some time later, Corruptor became a pawn of Imus Champion and had his powers amplified, allowing him to fully control minds. He uses this power to turn the Squadron Supreme against the Avengers shortly after they return from Counter-Earth.

Corruptor escapes to Japan, where he is confronted by Sunfire. Corruptor is detained in the Vault and eventually transferred to the Raft. He was one of the 46 villains to escape the Raft when Electro broke out Sauron.

Corruptor returns to Smyrna, Delaware, and begins an elaborate plan to take over the city. Using flowers grown from water distilled with his own sweat, he releases his chemical influence over the entire town, quickly setting himself up as its mayor. His scheme is uncovered and thwarted by the New Warriors.

Corruptor later joins the Hood's gang, intending to take advantage of the split in the superhero community caused by the Superhuman Registration Act.

== Powers and abilities ==
The Corruptor's sweat glands exude psychoactive drugs which enable him to, by touch, subvert the will of any individual. His touch releases his victim's inhibitions, so that, if not given specific instructions, the victim will revert to uncontrollable behavior. Early in his career, he demonstrated such powers as super-strength, eye-beams, and teleportation, which he lost in later appearances.
