= The Hood (Marvel Comics) =

Comic book supervillain in Marvel Comics

- The Hood as seen on the variant cover of Dark Reign: The Hood Vol. 1 #1 (May 2009). Art by Marko Djurdjevic

Publication information
- Publisher: Marvel Comics
- First appearance: As the Hood: The Hood #1 (July 2002); As Ghost Rider: Ghost Rider: Final Vengeance #2 (June 2024)
- Created by: Brian K. Vaughan; Kyle Hotz; Eric Powell

In-story information
- Alter ego: Parker Robbins
- Species: Human/demon hybrid
- Team affiliations: The Cabal; Hood's Gang; The Initiative; Illuminati; Thunderbolts
- Notable aliases: The Hood; Ghost Rider
- Abilities: Mysticism and occult knowledge; Criminal mastermind; Marksmanship; Skilled in hand-to-hand combatant; Formerly: Infinity Gems; Reality manipulation using the Norn Stones; Magical hooded cloak and boots for invisibility and air walking; Demon transformation

The Hood (Parker Robbins) is a supervillain appearing in American comic books published by Marvel Comics. Created by writer Brian K. Vaughan and artists Kyle Hotz and Eric Powell, the character first appeared in The Hood #1 (July 2002). Formerly a petty criminal, Parker Robbins acquires the hood and boots of a Nisanti demon he seemingly kills, which grant him superhuman abilities such as levitation and invisibility. As the Hood, he becomes a well-known figure in New York City's criminal underworld, in which he forms his own crime syndicate. He also briefly becomes the new Ghost Rider in the 2024 miniseries Ghost Rider: Final Vengeance. While typically portrayed as a villain, the Hood has also occasionally been depicted as an antihero.

The character has been adapted from the comics into several other forms of media, including television series and video games. Anthony Ramos portrayed Parker Robbins in the Marvel Cinematic Universe (MCU) series Ironheart (2025).

== Publication history ==
Created by writer Brian K. Vaughan and artists Kyle Hotz and Eric Powell, the Hood first appeared in a self-titled MAX limited series in 2002, which featured his origin as a character who possesses a cloak and boots stolen from a Nisanti demon, which grant him invisibility and limited levitation, respectively.

The Hood next appeared in the 2006 miniseries Beyond!, a miniseries set in outer space, which had the character shift towards a slightly more anti-heroic position, as opposed to a villainous one.

Brian Michael Bendis stated in a 2007 Newsarama interview that, within the pages of New Avengers, Parker Robbins would be getting similar treatment to Vito Corleone in The Godfather Part II. Bendis said that "... like the Sentry and Echo—the Hood is one of these excellent brand new creations that no one else was touching, and that's how they fall by the wayside."

Confirming the statement and having Parker return to his villainous roots, a 2007 New Avengers storyline had Parker rise to becoming "the 'Godfather' of all supervillains", mostly because the events of Civil War prevented any heroes from stopping him. Although the New Avengers defeated the Hood's new gang of supercriminals, he broke them out, only to be defeated once more.

Following 2008's Secret Invasion, the Hood has a more prominent role as part of the Cabal, and features in his own tie-in limited series, Dark Reign: The Hood, written by Jeff Parker. In 2024, Parker became the new Ghost Rider in the limited series Ghost Rider: Final Vengeance, before returning to the title of the Hood.

== Fictional character biography ==
=== Origin ===
Parker Robbins' father worked closely with the Kingpin and had a healthy relationship with his son while he was growing up. As a child, Parker witnessed a battle between Daredevil and Electro, which would have a profound effect on his young adulthood. After his father's death, Parker's mother entered a near-vegetative state and was hospitalized. Deeply troubled, Parker soon turned to a life of crime, and would lie to his mother about the jobs he had found during his visits. Parker's well-meaning nature was juxtaposed with his philandering and thieving ways, such as taking care of his pregnant girlfriend Sara while visiting a prostitute on the side.

One night, John King, Parker's cousin and best friend who is a recovering alcoholic and thief, tells him about a job at a warehouse said to be housing valuable goods. Taking the job, Parker accompanies John to the warehouse, where they stumble upon an abandoned mystic ritual, resulting in an encounter with a Nisanti demon. Parker shoots the demon, seemingly killing it, and steals its hooded cloak and boots, not wanting to leave empty-handed. After tossing his gun in a dumpster, Parker encounters a gang who want the boots he had stolen off an agent of Hydra before going to the warehouse. Throwing the boots at the gang, he flees and puts on the demon's boots, learning of their levitation powers.

Parker later shares his discovery with John and decides to try on the cloak as well, discovering it allows him to become invisible while holding his breath. After using his powers to commit petty robberies, Parker agrees to help John steal a shipment of blood diamonds. The diamonds belong to crime boss Dennis Golembuski (aka Golem) who hired Constrictor, Jack O'Lantern, Shocker and Madame Rapier to guard them. However, Parker overpowers them and steals half of the shipment. Parker gives the diamonds to the still-living enforcers to deliver to Golem, believing this will end the conflict between them. Elsewhere, the Golem receives the diamonds and the Hood's message, and he vows that nothing was ended between them.

=== Beyond! ===
Alongside Spider-Man, Venom, Gravity, Medusa, Hank Pym, the Wasp, Kraven the Hunter, and Firebird, the Hood is transported to the reconstructed Battleworld. While in transit, they are told that one victor will have a wish granted by the Beyonder, should the other combatants die. The Hood attempts to capitalize on this by using his invisibility to launch a sneak attack on the gathered heroes and villains, but is battered by Kraven. During the confusion of the Hood's attack, Venom manages to impale Spider-Man through the chest.

The Hood takes Spider-Man to the camp and forces him to reveal himself as a Space Phantom imposter. After battling the Space Phantom, the Hood accompanies the group into Limbo to wait for the Space Phantom to appear when he chooses his next target for impersonation. In Limbo, Venom destroys the portal on Battleworld, claiming victory. As Battleworld collapses, the group escapes, with Gravity sacrificing himself to save the others. Gravity is returned to life a short time later.

=== Hood's criminal empire ===
The Hood's crime syndicate. Art by Carlo Pagulayan.

The Hood begins his quest to become the Kingpin of all supervillains in New York by inviting a large contingent of villains to a meeting. He gives each of them $25,000 of seed money, partly to gain their confidence, and partly to buy their loyalty. To prove himself to the gathered supervillains, the Hood seeks out and viciously beats Tigra, threatening her mother's life as a warning.

At the after party, Chemistro informs the Hood of a plot by Owl to sell Deathlok, who he stole from S.H.I.E.L.D., to the highest bidder. As Owl has not gained permission from his new crime syndicate, the Hood decides to gatecrash the auction. He effortlessly ambushes and dispatches Owl, taking Deathlok for himself.

=== "Secret Invasion" ===
The "Secret Invasion" storyline revealed that Skrulls have been trying to infiltrate the Hood's organization. Skrulls disguised as S.H.I.E.L.D. agents try to replace Madame Masque, but is rescued by the Hood. During the surviving Skrull's interrogation, Doctor Demonicus convinces the Hood to use his power to scan the surrounding villains. It is discovered that Slug is a Skrull in disguise. The Hood shoots and kills him with the other villains wondering how long the Skrull had been impersonating Slug. Later by himself, the Hood discovers that his power comes from the mystical entity Dormammu.

The Hood is seen watching live coverage of the Skrull invasion on television in Brooklyn with Wizard, Madame Masque, the Blood Brothers, King and Bulldozer. He decides to gather everyone to fight the Skrulls, despite Chemistro's objections. When the battle is over, the villains all return to hiding. The Hood is later seen meeting with Namor, Doctor Doom, Emma Frost, Loki and Norman Osborn, forming the Cabal.

=== "Dark Reign" ===
The Cabal's first meeting is shown at the start of the 2008 "Dark Reign" storyline. Namor, Frost, Doctor Doom, Loki and the Hood discuss Osborn's plans for the new world order. When the Hood enters, Frost reads his mind only to make him angry. He threatens Frost with a gun, telling Frost to stay out of his head and that she does not know who she is messing with. In response, Frost telepathically forces him to put his own gun in his mouth, to Namor's amusement. Osborn offers the Cabal solidarity and the resources to accomplish their own agendas. In return, Osborn asks for their public support/registration, as well as cooperation fulfilling any request he may have of them.

After the Punisher tries to assassinate Osborn, Osborn asks the Hood to hunt the Punisher down. The Hood sends Grizzly to take down Punisher. After Grizzly is defeated, the Hood forces Microchip to help kill the Punisher. The Hood uses the powers of Dormammu to resurrect the villains who were killed by the Scourge of the Underworld to form a squad that will help him take down the Punisher. The Hood offers to resurrect Punisher's family in exchange for him surrendering, but he declines.

The Hood later starts a gang war with Mister Negative after he corrupts White Dragon (who has been sent to gather information about Negative's group) causing the Hood to kill White Dragon. The Hood's crime syndicate ends up fighting Spider-Man (who has been corrupted by Negative) and Negative's henchmen. After Spider-Man's attack on his headquarters, the Hood confronts Negative in his Chinatown headquarters. Mister Negative tries to corrupt the Hood to his side, but fails. Though he gains the upper hand, Negative escapes.

Dormammu empowers the Hood with enough magic to find and kill Doctor Strange, so that Hood can become the new Sorcerer Supreme. The Hood approaches Strange, while he is talking to Wiccan. As they fight, Strange tells the Hood that Dormammu's promises are empty, as are all other demons, but Hood ignores him and attacks them both. After Wiccan intervenes, Strange and Wiccan get away and Parker goes home. While there, he has a breakdown and tries to rip off his cloak but finds he cannot. Madame Masque appears, wanting to know what is going on. Masque promises to help him, removes her mask, and they kiss. Unknown to them, Dormammu watches from a mirror. Later on, Parker goes and attacks Daimon Hellstrom. He later fights Doctor Strange and the New Avengers until Brother Voodoo (who has become the new Sorcerer Supreme) arrives. Dormammu manifests through Parker, but is exorcised. Parker is left badly burned and stripped of his hood. In a hospital, Loki approaches him offering him a second chance, which he accepts.

Loki takes Hood and Madame Masque to Cuba and presents the Norn Stones to him, which brings back his powers. The Hood and Masque return and learn from King that Jonas Harrow and the rest of the gang have found about his deal with Osborn and made their own. Already, the Hood finds out that his gang has surrendered themselves to Osborn. When Harrow arrives, Hood kills him.

=== "Siege" ===
During the 2010 storyline "Siege", the Hood is present at the Cabal when Norman Osborn assembles them to discuss Asgard. After Doctor Doom demands that Osborn brings Namor to him, Osborn has Doom attacked by an unknown assailant. After the attack, Osborn examines the body to see that it is not Doom, but a small swarm of robotic insects inside a Doombot. The insects attack the Cabal. Under the suggestion of Loki, the Hood flees from the attack.

When visiting his brother Dwayne's grave, Donyell Taylor is conflicted if he should go with the deal Osborn and the Hood gave him to resurrect Dwayne. When Donyell arrives, the Hood gives him an opportunity to prove himself by killing Tigra. Instead, Donyell attacks the Hood and is joined by Tigra. The Hood receives a call from Osborn requesting his assistance in Asgard, so he leaves in a portal while the other villains continue fighting.

The Hood and his gang catch up with the New Avengers at Asgard and try to stop them. The Hood later tries to attack Balder, thinking him to be an easy target, only for Balder to fend him off. Loki ends up taking back the Norn Stones from the Hood to empower the New Avengers, Young Avengers, and Secret Warriors with the power to defeat the Void. While the Dark Avengers and those who assisted them are being arrested, the Hood manages to escape with Madame Masque's help. The Hood is pessimistic, knowing that his gang would simply sell him out. However, Masque refuses to let him go down. This causes Masque to seek out her father Count Nefaria to help the Hood. The New Avengers capture John King, and use him to track the Hood and Masque. After a battle with Nefaria, they capture the villains and bring all four of them to Maria Hill to place them under arrest.

=== Heroic Age ===
At some point in time, Parker Robbins escapes jail, and has an imposter replace him in his cell. Staying with his cousin, he is attacked by Striker, Hazmat, and Veil from Avengers Academy, in response to the tape of Hood's assault on Tigra being leaked online. This, along with other personal factors, gives him the desire to regain his power, and kill every one of the Avengers.

After acquiring the Power Gem and Reality Gem, Hood steals Space Gem from Iron Man, using it to teleport the Avengers away to an unknown location. He is faced by Thor and Red Hulk, who have the Time Gem. During the conflict, Red Hulk manages to steal the Power Gem from Hood. As Uatu the Watcher watches, Thor implores Hood to surrender, lest he kill himself. Hood declines the offer, and teleports to the ruins of the X-Mansion, where Charles Xavier is leading the Avengers to secure the Mind Gem. Effortlessly, Hood gets the Gem and engages in a mental battle with Xavier, emerging triumphant. Iron Man takes the Reality Gem and uses the Infinity Gauntlet to send Hood back to jail.

=== Modern adventures ===
After Zarathos separates from Johnny Blaze, he is drawn to the Hood and makes a deal with Mephisto. Hood then allied with a gang of vampires led by Hellmuth as part of a plan to take down the five families of Chicago. He and Hellmuth would later have a falling out after three of the family leaders are killed. After Sara and Breanne were turned into vampires by Hellmuth, he plotted to burn Chicago to the ground and encountered Johnny Blaze and his ally Zebadiah. When Mephisto appears, the Hood offers his soul in exchange for Mephisto returning to Sara and Breanne to normal. Mephisto complies and takes Hood to Hell.

Hood escapes from Hell, reunites with Deathwatch, and allies with the Darkholders in a bid to regain his power. The Darkholders begin collecting the pieces of Chthon that are scattered across the world and discover that one of the essences of Chthon is in the possession of Werewolf by Night. Hood shoots Werewolf by Night in the shoulder as Lilith summons the ghosts of fallen Darkholders to pursue him. Hood tells Werewolf by Night how to get rid of the Lilin before fleeing.

== Powers and abilities ==
=== Facilities ===
The Hood is talented with firearms and various methods of criminal enterprise. He has access to dual Hydra/A.I.M. technologies. Robbins seems to retain some knowledge of the occult, having re-established his magical abilities via contract with another demon.

He also retained a magical cloak, alongside some mystical abilities, such as teleportation and invisibility. He has the ability to channel magic through his guns, something he only does for focus; he told a team of heroes that the pistols were merely for show, at which point he made a gun-pointing gesture with his fingers and blew up a floor on his penthouse condo.

He had somehow reacquired access to the Norn Stones as well, having used one to resurrect Hammerhead after he was fatally shot through the skull using unknown weaponry.

=== Previous Dormammu-related powers ===
The mystical boots and hooded cloak Parker wears give him superhuman abilities. When wearing the boots, the Hood can walk on air. While wearing the hooded cloak and holding his breath, he becomes invisible.

Robbins also finds that he can use the hooded cloak to see past the illusion protecting Doctor Strange's headquarters. During the Skrull Invasion, it is revealed that Parker can detect Skrulls using an enhanced disguise that fools even the likes of Doctor Strange and Professor X.

Robbins has the ability to transform demonically when under duress, gaining physical strength and speed to match Wolverine in one-on-one combat. In this demon form, his voice changes and he can sprout spikes from his hands. At least once, this allows Robbins to fire electrical energy from his hands. According to Doctor Strange, Robbins' powers will eventually kill him as the Nisanti consumes his mind, body, and soul. It was revealed that the Hood's mystical powers come from Dormammu, which even enables him to resurrect the dead.

In one storyline, an exorcism appears to have removed the Hood from Robbins along with its mystical abilities.

=== Previous use of the Norn Stones ===
With Loki's help, the Hood acquired the Stones of Norn. The removal of these powers appears to cause harm to those who have been empowered. The Norn Stones also show the ability, similar to Thor's hammer, impossible to lift by anyone other than the chosen bearer. The Hood lost the powers of the Norn Stones when Loki retook possession of them to empower the heroes in their attack on the Sentry. According to Loki, they have the power to make him anything he wants to be. Parker has used them to beef up his weapons and gain powers to replicate those given by his possession by Dormammu. They have also been shown to power up anyone he desires.

=== Previous Infinity Gem powers ===
The Hood had demonstrated various abilities through use of the Infinity Gems. While observing the Hood's actions, Uatu the Watcher noted that the Hood's ability to use the Gems, while impressive, was still limited because he simply thought about using the Gems to enhance his own power rather than really thinking about what he could do with them, to the point of engaging his enemies in direct combat when he could simply will them out of existence.

== Reception ==
- In 2020, CBR.com ranked The Hood 3rd in their "Marvel: 10 Famous Villains From The 2000s To Bring Back" list.

== Other versions ==
=== House of M ===
An alternate reality version of the Hood appears in House of M: Masters of Evil. This version was empowered by a different demon instead of Dormammu and formed the Masters of Evil to defy Magneto. After Magneto and Sebastian Shaw expose the group's criminal pasts, half of the members leave while the Hood and most of the remaining members are killed by the Red Guard.

=== Secret Wars (2015) ===
An alternate reality version of the Hood appears in Secret Wars as a resident of the Warzone, a domain of Battleworld.

== Collected editions ==
Title	Material Collected	Publication Date	ISBN
The Hood: Blood from Stones	The Hood #1–6	August 1, 2007	0785128182
Dark Reign: The Hood	Dark Reign: The Hood #1–5	January 6, 2010	0785141634
Ghost Rider: Final Vengeance	Ghost Rider: Final Vengeance #1–6	November 12, 2024	1302957074

== In other media ==
=== Television ===
- The Hood appears in the Marvel Future Avengers episode "Infiltration Black Market Auction", voiced by Masakazu Nishida in the Japanese version and by Todd Haberkorn in the English dub.
- The Hood appears in TV series set in the Marvel Cinematic Universe (MCU):
  - An original American frontier-themed incarnation of the Hood appears in the What If...? episode "What If... 1872?" as a sentient hooded cloak that corrupts individuals, such as an unidentified man and Xu Xialing (voiced by Meng'er Zhang).
  - Parker Robbins / Hood appears in Ironheart, portrayed by Anthony Ramos. This version is the leader of a Chicago street gang who received his namesake from Mephisto following a botched robbery of his father Arthur's house.

=== Video games ===
- The Hood appears in Marvel: Avengers Alliance.
- The Hood appears in Marvel Heroes, voiced by Dave Boat.
- The Hood appears in Marvel Puzzle Quest.
- The Hood appears as a playable character in Marvel: Contest of Champions.
- The Hood appears in Marvel Snap.
- The Hood appears in Marvel: Future Fight.
- The Hood appears as a playable character in Marvel Rivals, voiced by Damian Priest.

=== Miscellaneous ===
The Hood appears in the Spider-Man 2 / Free Comic Book Day tie-in prequel comic. He gathers a group to help him commit robberies to raise enough money to buy the Lifeline Tablet, a relic rumored to hold power over life and death, so he can save his dying mother. Amidst interference from the Spider-Men, the Hood discovers the tablet is ineffective. After the Spider-Men allow him time to spend time with his mother before she dies, the Hood willingly turns himself in.
