= Living Lightning =

Marvel Comics superhero

Publication information
- Publisher: Marvel Comics
- First appearance: Avengers West Coast #63 (October 1990)
- Created by: Dann Thomas (co-writer); Roy Thomas (co-writer); Paul Ryan (artist)

In-story information
- Alter ego: Miguel Santos
- Team affiliations: Pacific Overlords; West Coast Avengers; Secret Avengers; Rangers
- Notable aliases: Lightning, Relampago Vivo
- Abilities: Skilled street fighter Flight at sub-light speeds Electrical manipulation

Living Lightning (Miguel Santos) is a fictional superhero appearing in American comic books published by Marvel Comics. He first appeared in Avengers West Coast #63, published in October, 1990. The character was created by writers Dann Thomas and Roy Thomas and artist Paul Ryan.

Miguel Santos started out trying to clear the name of his father, Carlos Santos, by investigating the Legion of the Living Lightning. During his investigations, a machine accidentally gave him electrical superpowers. Santos became a member of the Avengers West Coast and served with them during Operation: Galactic Storm. During the Civil War, Living Lightning sided with Captain America in opposing super hero registration. At the end of the Civil War, Living Lighting joined the Initiative, becoming a member of the Texas-based super-team, the Rangers.

== Creation ==
Thomas spoke on his personal blog on the creation of the character stating:

"I don't know if Miguel Santos, the Living Lightning was the first Hispanic super-hero at Marvel or not; that wasn't the idea when I came up with him, but he was certainly one of the first, at least. Having lived at that time in Los Angeles since mid-1976, I thought it was about time.

The name was taken from Stan Lee (who else?), who way back in the late-60s TALES TO ASTONISH had made up the Legion of the Living Lightning as one of the many "secret empire"-type groups running around in those days, drawn in that case by Marie Severin. Later, when writing THOR, I liked the phrase "living lightning" so much that I had him often refer to himself as the "lord of the living lightning." But eventually, I decided I wanted that name solidly affixed to a super-hero... an electrical echo of the Human Torch, of course. (Back when I was 10-12, something like that, I had written and drawn a few stories, or at least pages, about a similar hero I called Shockman, or occasionally Shockwave... I drew him, so far as I could, to LOOK like an electric version of the Torch. So this was just reviving that idea 40 or so years later.)

Dann and I worked him out, since, as a Los Angeleno, she had gone to school (and later worked with) numerous Hispanics. And our neighbor across the street was named Santos... so we took the last name from that. Dann spoke a little Spanish, and I had learned a tiny bit when gearing up for a month-long drive through Mexico in 1964... and we decided that, like some folks we'd both run into and read about in THE L.A. TIMES, he would speak mostly English, with some Spanish words tossed in for flavor. That was only one, and perhaps not perfect, way to approach LL's speech pattern, but we did the best we could. If others came up with more "authentic" speech patterns later, fine... that was up to them.

The first story with the Living Lightning (whom I tied in with the Legion of Living Lightning, partly to acknowledge the name's ultimate source) was drawn by Paul Ryan in AVENGERS WEST COAST #63... but, while Paul was a splendid artist, I was unhappy with the way LL looked in that story. I had wanted a real "crackle" to him... his human figure far less "contained" by his electrical aura than, say, the Torch's was by his flame aura. I wanted the electricity to look as if it were constantly seeking to escape the bonds of the human figure, so that as he flew his legs basically disappeared into a Mighty-Mouse-like trail of electrical crackle. That look was achieved perfectly with Canadian artist Dave Ross drew him, starting in AVENGERS WEST COAST #74."

== Publication history ==
Living Lightning first appeared in the story "When Lives the Lightning" in Avengers West Coast #63 (October, 1990), written by Dann Thomas and Roy Thomas, and illustrated by Paul Ryan. From 1991 to 1994, he began as an enemy of Avengers West Coast in Avengers West Coast #71–73 then became a member of the team and has made nineteen other appearances in this series with #74–80, #82, #84–90, #92, #96, #100, #102 and two in Avengers West Coast Annual #7–8.

In 1992, as an Avenger, he appeared in other titles of the crossover Operation: Galactic Storm with The Avengers #345, #347, Captain America #401, Quasar #33, Thor #445–446 and Wonder Man vol.2 #8–9.

During the same year, Miguel Santos played a role in the comic book limited series Infinity War with #1–3, 6 and several tie-ins. In 1993, he appeared in the sequel, Infinity Crusade with #1, #3–5 and the tie-in Web of Spider-Man with #104, #106.

In 1998, Living Lightning appeared in The Avengers #1–3.

In 2005, he made a brief appearance in GLA #2 written by Dan Slott, in which Living Lightning is revealed to be gay.

From 2006 to 2008, Miguel Santos played a role in the events of Civil War. He appeared in Civil War #4–6, The Amazing Spider-Man #537, Civil War: Battle Damage Report #1, Civil War: Front Line #11 and Civil War Chronicles #6. Living Lightning has been identified as one of the 142 registered superheroes who appear on the cover of the comic book Avengers: The Initiative #1. The character became a member of the Rangers and appeared in the issues #2 (July 2007) and #19 (January 2009) of this series.

In 2009, he made two appearances in the series Avengers Unconquered with the episodes #4 and #6. This series is a part of Marvel UK's 'Collectors' Edition' line. It is published by Panini Comics and reprints Marvel Comics from the United States.

In 2012, writer Chris Yost chose the Texas team the Rangers to come into conflict with Houston's new superhero Scarlet Spider in the story "The Second Master" in Scarlet Spider #7–9. In an interview with Comic Book Resources, at a question about the antagonists in the story, Chris Yost answered "You'll also be seeing a well known super-hero group from the American southwest named – wait for it – The Rangers! Texas Twister! Shooting Star! Red Wolf! Living Lightning! Firebird! Even a new hero or two! And spoiler alert – Scarlet Spider will fight them."

Living Lightning was featured as a main character during the 2018 storyline "No Surrender" in Avengers #675-690.

Living Lightning has also been depicted in two alternative universes with "What If the Avengers Lost Operation Galactic Storm?", What If...? #55–56 (1993) and with a brief appearance in "What if the Scarlet Witch Hadn't Acted Alone?", What If? Avengers Disassembled (2006).

The character has entries in The Official Handbook of the Marvel Universe: Master Edition #28 (1990), in The Official Handbook of the Marvel Universe: Avengers 2005 and also in The Marvel Encyclopedia (2006).

== Fictional character biography ==
Miguel Santos was born in East Los Angeles, California. Miguel's father, Carlos, was a member of an extremist group called the Legion of the Living Lightning. In a misguided attempt by the Legion to gain control of the Hulk, the group battled him. The Legion was thus destroyed, and Carlos was killed.

Hoping to salvage his father's name, high school student Miguel broke into the Legion's headquarters to learn more about their work. While exploring, Miguel unwittingly turned on one of the Legion's machines and was transformed into a being of living energy. Initially, a confused Miguel clashed with the West Coast Avengers and was apparently killed during the conflict. Miguel is later revealed to have survived and is captured by the villain Doctor Demonicus, then coerced to join the Pacific Overlords. After a brief, unwilling foray into crime, Miguel aids the Avengers West Coast, and then joins the team. He eventually decides to become an Avengers reservist while attending college.

The Great Lakes Avengers (GLA) invites Miguel Santos in order to recruit him in their team. During the meeting, he turns them down, explaining that he had attended thinking the team's acronym GLA referred to the Gay/Lesbian Alliance. With his explanation, he inadvertently reveals that he was gay to GLA member Flatman.

During the Civil War storyline, Miguel joins Captain America's Secret Avengers as one of twenty new members who oppose the Superhuman Registration Act. He works with the team out of a series of safe houses set up by Nick Fury. He is part of the final battle between the two main sides. After Captain America surrenders to the authorities, Living Lightning became an Initiative recruit, joining the Texas Rangers.

After the Dark Reign storyline, Living Lightning began doing private security work for the Avengers; notably protecting the family of Avengers Academy student Striker.

During the Avengers: No Surrender story arc, Living Lightning makes the Grandmaster back down and surrender the Avengers he had captured as part of the latest game through a daring bluff; by provoking the Grandmaster into a game of poker, Lightning raises the stakes of the game to have the loser have their accomplishments wiped from the memories of all who knew of them.

== Sexuality ==
Art from GLA #2, by Paul Pelletier.

During his tenure in the West Coast Avengers, Miguel dated women. Later, though, Miguel was approached by members of the Great Lakes Avengers, who hoped to recruit them for their team. When he heard the team's acronym (GLA), Miguel mistook them for the Gay/Lesbian Alliance and inadvertently revealed that he was gay to GLA member Flatman.

Writer Dan Slott commented in an interview about his decision to out Living Lightning: "He's gay. Get over it. Previous girlfriends? Beards. Or relationships that just didn't work—because Miguel hadn't come to terms yet with who he really is. Miguel is a gay superhero and a wonderful role model."

== Powers and abilities ==
Living Lightning gained superhuman powers when he absorbed energy from an experimental lightning weapon. Living Lightning has the ability to transform his body into electrical plasma, in which form he can fly at sub-light speed, generate electrical power as shocks or bolts, and surround himself with a protective electrical force field. He has the ability to control his body while composed of electrical plasma, at which time his mind exists only in astral form.

In his true form, Living Lightning is just that, a sentient electrical force with no mass. In this form, he can fly, reaching sub-light speeds, withstanding the vacuum of space, and is impervious to most physical and energy attacks. He also possesses the ability to fire and manipulate bursts of electricity and electrical fields of varying intensities in his solid form, however, he must wear a special containment suit to retain a solid form.

Miguel has knowledge of basic street-fighting techniques. He is bilingual in Spanish and English.
