= Armadillo (character) =

Marvel Comics fictional character

- Armadillo, as seen in Marvel Universe. Art by John Byrne.

Publication information
- Publisher: Marvel Comics
- First appearance: Captain America #308 (August 1985)
- Created by: Mark Gruenwald; Paul Neary

In-story information
- Alter ego: Antonio Rodriguez
- Species: Human mutate
- Place of origin: Earth-616
- Team affiliations: Unlimited Class Wrestling Federation; The Rangers; Vil-Anon; Sinister Sixteen; Hydra; Menagerie
- Notable aliases: Awesome Armadillo, 'Dillo, Mr. A, Tony
- Abilities: Skilled street fighter Superhuman strength, stamina and durability Hardened claws Armored hide

Armadillo (Antonio Rodriguez) is a supervillain appearing in American comic books published by Marvel Comics. Created by writer Mark Gruenwald and artist Paul Neary, he first appeared in Captain America #308 (August 1985). Armadillo is a superhuman with the appearance and abilities of an armadillo, including enhanced strength, durability, and the ability to curl into a ball.

Initially introduced as an antagonist, his transformation was the result of experimental procedures performed on him in the hopes of curing his girlfriend’s terminal illness, which ultimately led to his mutation. Over time, Armadillo transitioned from a reluctant villain to a recurring antihero, occasionally working with teams such as the Initiative and serving as a minor ally to established heroes.

The character has appeared in various Marvel media, including animated series and video games.

== Publication history ==
Created by Mark Gruenwald and Paul Neary, the character made his first appearance in Captain America #308 (August 1985).

Gruenwald recounted that Armadillo "is just a silly monster I wanted to throw in as kind of a joke on the old Marvel armadillo thing in the letters page".

== Fictional character biography ==
Antonio Rodriguez was born in San Antonio, Texas. Karl Malus subjected Rodriguez to genetic experiments that gave him the appearance and abilities of an armadillo. The Armadillo's original motivation during his criminal career was to get enough money to cure his girlfriend Maria Bonita of an unspecified terminal illness. After she is successfully cured, Maria abandons Armadillo because of his appearance. Since then, his motive has been to secure enough money to reverse the process which transformed him.

The Armadillo later joins the Unlimited Class Wrestling Federation. While on tour with the UCWF, he battles Captain America and Hawkeye atop the Empire State Building. He has apparently gone berserk after discovering his estranged wife Bonita with another man. As a result, Armadillo attempts to commit suicide by jumping off a building. He survives the fall, but is arrested.

Having fallen on hard times, Armadillo joins Constrictor and Jack O'Lantern in robbing an armored car. After being defeated by Hercules, Armadillo is incarcerated at the Raft. During a break-out initiated by Electro, Armadillo and Tiger Shark escape and hide out in Fairbury, Illinois until they are caught by the New Warriors. Afterwards, Armadillo joins Vil-Anon, a twelve-step group dedicated to helping individuals overcome their criminal tendencies.

Armadillo joins the Fifty State Initiative, as a member of Texas's superhero team, the Rangers. However, he is fired by the Rangers for unstated reasons. He is next seen doing lucha libre wrestling in Mexico for small cash, eventually being recruited by MODOK. After being one of the few villains who does not betray MODOK, Armadillo gains more money than initially promised. He happily departs with Puma and Nightshade (with whom he had developed a friendship, and shows a desire for them to remain as a team).

Daisy Schilling, Armadillo's girlfriend, leaves him because he was distant. Later, Daisy becomes a model in Texas and is engaged to Wyatt Taft. After learning of this, a drunk Armadillo attacks a Houston rodeo calling for her. Daisy reveals that she had always loved Armadillo and embraces him.

Following the Avengers vs. X-Men storyline, Armadillo is seen taking part in a prison riot. Following the riot, Boomerang and Owl hire Armadillo onto the Sinister Sixteen to distract Chameleon's forces while Boomerang steals from him.

Armadillo joins Hydra after Helmut Zemo promises to cure his condition in exchange for his allegiance. He takes part in Hydra's plot to sterilize the human race by using Inhuman blood, but betrays Zemo after Sam Wilson, the new Captain America, tells Armadillo that by serving Hydra, he would be trading his soul and humanity just to be cured.

During the "Gang War" storyline, Armadillo appears as a member of the Menagerie. Armadillo and Man-Bull battle Spider-Man and She-Hulk until Mary Jane Watson arrives and helps Spider-Man subdue Armadillo.

== Powers and abilities ==
Armadillo was genetically altered by Karl Malus, resulting in an armadillo-like appearance and enhanced strength, stamina and durability. His armored body provides resistance to gunfire and other form of physical injury, while his claws are capable of cutting through durable materials. He can also curl his body into a ball in a manner similar to an armadillo.

Armadillo is depicted as a skilled hand-to-hand combatant and had experience as a street fighter prior to undergoing his superhuman transformation.

== Reception ==
- In 2020, CBR.com ranked Armadillo 1st in their "Spider-Man: 10 Weirdest Animal Villains From The Comics That We'd Like To See In The MCU" list.

== In other media ==
- Armadillo appears in M.O.D.O.K., voiced by Dustin Ybarra. This version longs for his wife Irene even though they have been apart for eight years and he never formally proposed to her. Armadillo makes efforts to win Irene back, but ends up in a fight with her new husband Mandrill until MODOK breaks it up and convinces Armadillo to move on.
- Armadillo makes a cameo appearance in Spider-Man: Across the Spider-Verse.
