= Psyklop =

Marvel Comics fictional character

- Psyklop's first appearance in Avengers #88.

Publication information
- Publisher: Marvel Comics
- First appearance: Avengers #88 (May 1971)
- Created by: Harlan Ellison; Roy Thomas; Sal Buscema; Jim Mooney

In-story information
- Team affiliations: Dark Gods
- Abilities: Genius-level intellect Energy projection Hypnosis; Enhanced strength, speed, agility, durability, and endurance Powerful claws and fangs Double-jointed limbs

Psyklop is a supervillain appearing in American comic books published by Marvel Comics. Created by Harlan Ellison, Roy Thomas, Sal Buscema and Jim Mooney, the character first appeared in Avengers #88.

== Fictional character biography ==
Psyklop is the last survivor of an intelligent insectoid semi-humanoid race which evolved from insects and existed on Earth and dominated the planet in prehistoric times; during their time, Psyklop's race prospered, but they soon fell out of favor with their Dark Gods they worshiped, and were put into a state of hibernation.

Eons later, Psyklop is awakened by the Dark Gods, who charge him with finding a power source for them. If he did so, his race would be awakened and allowed to conquer the Earth. After covertly organizing a voodoo-based cult in New Orleans, Psyklop discovers that the Hulk possessed the power he needs to energize the Dark Gods, and captures the Hulk for study. Transporting the Hulk to his lair, Psyklop, explaining his origin and intentions to him, begins the process of shrinking the Hulk to a size where his molecular structure can be examined better. Psyklop loses track of the Hulk, accidentally sending him to a "micro-world", after being distracted by the Avengers and the Falcon, who have traced Psyklop to his base.

Psyklop, after searching for the Hulk, finds him in the sub-atomic world of K'ai. Still wanting to harness the power of the Hulk, Psyklop shrinks himself to capture him. Successfully obtaining the Hulk, Psyklop returns to his base with him, only to be violently pummeled. As the Hulk prepares to kill Psyklop, Psyklop is taken away by the Dark Gods, who abandon him on K'ai and left with no way to return to his regular size.

While on K'ai, Psyklop begins to form a plan, inspired by an incident caused by the Hulk, who had accidentally kicked K'ai while leaving the planet, causing chaotic earthquakes. Creating a large drilling device, Psyklop begins to create catastrophic earthquakes on K'ai, telling the planet's inhabitants he would only stop his destruction if they worship him as a god. The Hulk, wanting to face this "angry god" who threatened the inhabitants of K'ai, ventures to Psyklop's headquarters with Jarella to confront the god. After destroying a robotic sentinel at Psyklop's base, the Hulk is knocked unconscious by Psyklop, who blasts him with a large projectile weapon. Having had his weaponry destroyed, Psyklop resorts to using his hypnotic powers against the Hulk, managing to brainwash him. Psyklop then sends the Hulk out to attack the inhabitants of K'ai, who have begun to storm Psyklop's base. Unfortunately for Psyklop, the Hulk is returned to normal by three K'ai sorcerers. Psyklop panics and attempts to hypnotize the Hulk again, only to fail. Advancing on Psyklop, the Hulk smashes the ground hard enough to break the urn in which Psyklop kept the spirits he captured. Before he can react, Psyklop is consumed by the spirits freed from the urn.

== Powers and abilities ==
Psyklop is an inventive genius and has mastery of the advanced technology of his race. Psyklop has access to advanced technology, including a hand-held ray-blaster firing beams of concussive force, sonic displacer beams, Spasm-rays (able to disrupt the nervous systems of his victims) and teleporters. He wears body armor of unknown materials. Psyklop has also employed giant Lemurian slug creatures, teleportation rays, shrinking rays, giant robots, planetary view-scanners, a dreadnought-drill (capable of producing planet-wide earthquakes), and an essence-urn (capable of storing the life-forces of living beings).

Psyklop has a single compound eye, like all members of his race. He can fire energy blasts from his eye, and his eye allows him to instantaneously hypnotize a victim through beams of light from his single eye.

Psyklop has enhanced strength, speed, agility, endurance, and durability, and is an average hand-to-hand combatant. He has sharpened canine teeth, and clawed and double-jointed limbs.

== In other media ==
An illusory Psyklop appears in the Spider-Man and His Amazing Friends episode "The Prison Plot".
