= Beyond! =

Six-issue comic book limited series

- Cover to Beyond #1. Art by Scott Kolins.

Publication information
- Publisher: Marvel Comics
- Schedule: Monthly
- Format: Limited series
- Publication date: July 2006 - December 2006
- No. of issues: Six
- Main character(s): Hank Pym; Wasp; Gravity; Medusa; Firebird; Alyosha Kravinoff; Venom; The Hood; Deathlok; Space Phantom

Creative team
- Created by: Dwayne McDuffie; Scott Kolins
- Written by: Dwayne McDuffie
- Artist: Scott Kolins
- Penciller: Scott Kolins
- Inker: Scott Kolins
- Colorist: Paul Mounts

Beyond! was a six-issue comic book limited series published by Marvel Comics. It was written by Dwayne McDuffie and illustrated by Scott Kolins. The first issue of the series was released on July 6, 2006 and the final issue on December 6. It was edited by Tom Brevoort and lettered by Dave Lamphear.

== Synopsis ==
The series follows a group of mismatched superheroes and supervillains — Hank Pym, Wasp, Gravity, Medusa, Firebird, Alyosha Kravinoff, Venom (Mac Gargan), the Hood and a Space Phantom —who have been abducted by a cosmic entity, supposedly The Beyonder, to the alien Battleworld for unknown purposes. Deathlok was later introduced to the roster.

== Plot ==
A mysterious man buries three recently killed familiar aliens (Bi-Beast, a Skrull, and a Kree), the newest of many corpses in a huge graveyard. Meanwhile, on Earth, the fledgling hero Gravity defeats Brushfire in a quick fight, then examines a teleportation device that takes him to outer space. He awakens, meeting Spider-Man, Medusa, Firebird, Wasp, Venom (Mac Gargan, formerly the Scorpion), Hank Pym, Kraven the Hunter (Alyosha Kravinoff), and the Hood. Shortly after, a being, apparently the Beyonder, appears and claims that if they kill their enemies, they will have rewards in a nod to "Secret Wars". Venom promptly attacks Spider-Man, impaling him and demanding his reward. As Spider-Man apparently dies, he mistakes Medusa for Mary Jane Watson. She then retaliates, and after a quick argument with the others, uses her hair to whip Venom. The sonic booms hitting his body cause him potentially fatal damage, and when the others distract her, Venom runs away, destroying the ship's controls.

Gravity attempts to steer the ship, but is unable to control it and it crashes into the planet below. Medusa protects the others, using her hair like an airbag, but she is injured in the leg. Pym uses a shrunken medpack in his pocket and tends to her injury, when a mysterious man named Michael appears. Pym pulls out a shrunken Quinjet, and Michael says that flying is a bad idea. The group disembarks, only to be pursued by Dragon Man, who destroys the new jet. Michael then morphs, revealed to be Deathlok, while Spider-Man gets up, apparently undeceased.

Deathlok manages to overpower Dragon Man, with help from the remaining conscious heroes. Afterwards, Michael/Deathlok reveals that he has been here before, with a group consisting of Captain Marvel, Wonder Man, Darkhawk, Dracula, Terror, Coldblood, and Sleepwalker. Michael agreed to stay on the planet so the other heroes could return home. Meanwhile, Kraven manages to find Spider-Man, who is doing well despite massive body damage, and tells Kraven that he needs to slay the others, so that he wins. Kraven realizes this is not how Spider-Man would talk, and when the Hood shows up, and further damages the questionable hero, takes him to the group. "Spider-Man" reveals that he is really the Space Phantom.

The heroes battle Space Phantom, who uses his powers to become Xemnu. After a fight with the others, Pym defeats the Xemnu form and the Phantom becomes Northstar. Pym, who tagged the Phantom with a tracer, takes the others into Limbo. The real Northstar is there. Back on Battleworld, Venom destroys Pym's gateway to Limbo, stranding the group there and demanding for the Beyonder to give him his prize.

In Limbo, Firebird and Pym have a short romantic interlude, and when the Space Phantom comes back, the team threatens him. He teleports the entire group to Battleworld, where they defeat Venom. Suddenly, Pym seemingly uses a disintegration beam to destroy the entire group, and asks for his reward, and the Watcher appears. In truth, Pym has merely shrunk the group in order to draw out the "Beyonder".

Pym asks for three wishes: to return home; to learn the true identity of the "Beyonder", who is actually the Stranger; and for the Stranger to stop his experiment and never repeat it. Pym reveals that he only shrunk the group. The Stranger initially refuses to stop his experiment, but the Watcher's presence causes him to reconsider, and he leaves. Battleworld begins to break up, but Gravity temporarily holds together the world and sends the group to the teleporter, back to Earth, sacrificing his life. The entire group attends his funeral, including Mac Gargan. The Watcher states that he was there because Gravity's short career would inspire future events, and story captions state that Gravity's story is not over.

=== Aftermath ===
The story of Beyond! is continued in Fantastic Four #544, where Deathlok enlists the Fantastic Four to retrieve Gravity's corpse after he is stolen from his grave. After a discussion with the Watcher, the Fantastic Four discover that Gravity's body was stolen by Epoch. Epoch resurrects Gravity and appoints him the new protector of the universe following Quasar's death.

== Collected editions ==
- Beyond! Marvel Premier Hardcover, February 21, 2007. ISBN 978-0-7851-2624-9.
- Beyond! TPB, January 9, 2008
