= Marvel Spotlight =

Comic book anthology series

- Marvel Spotlight #1 (November 1971) featuring Red Wolf. Cover art by Neal Adams.

Publication information
- Publisher: Marvel Comics
- Format: Anthology
- Genre: Superhero
- Publication date: Volume 1 November 1971 – April 1977; Volume 2 July 1979 – March 1981
- No. of issues: Volume 1 33; Volume 2 11

Creative team
- Written by: Gardner Fox, Gary Friedrich, Archie Goodwin, Marv Wolfman
- Penciller(s): Sal Buscema, Steve Ditko, Mike Ploog, Syd Shores

Marvel Spotlight is a comic book anthology series published by Marvel Comics as a try-out book. It stood out from Marvel's other try-out books in that most of the featured characters made their first appearance in the series. The series originally ran for 33 issues from November 1971 to April 1977. A second volume ran for 11 issues from July 1979 to March 1981.

== Publication history ==
Marvel Spotlight was one of three tryout books proposed by Stan Lee after he transitioned from being Marvel Comics' writer and editor to its president and publisher, the others being Marvel Feature and Marvel Premiere. The advantage of such tryout books was that they allowed the publisher to assess a feature's popularity without the marketing investment required to launch a new series, and without the blow to the publisher's image with readers if the new series immediately failed.

The series began with a Red Wolf story. Editor Roy Thomas explained: "Stan [Lee] and I decided it'd be a good idea to have a book with an American Indian hero. ... Stan didn't want it as a modern-day character. I guess he was trying to see if he could find a way to get a Western to sell, because everybody in the field wanted to write or draw a Western". Following this successful try-out, Red Wolf was given his own series, as were Werewolf by Night, Ghost Rider, the Son of Satan, and Spider-Woman.

In addition to launching new series, Marvel Spotlight hosted some significant stories with established characters. Issue #31 provided a retroactive explanation for why Nick Fury (inextricably associated with World War II due to his starring role in Sgt. Fury and his Howling Commandos) remained so youthful, in the form of an experimental longevity serum. After a run of nearly six years, the series ended with Marvel Spotlight #33 (April 1977).

The series was revived in 1979, initially as simply a place to publish inventory stories from the recently cancelled Captain Marvel. However, once these leftover tales were exhausted, the series went on to feature other characters. Tako Shamara first appeared in Marvel Spotlight vol. 2 #5 (March 1980), in a story by Marv Wolfman and Steve Ditko. In his first appearance the character battled a huge dragon from the past called a Wani, a monster that destroyed his ancestors' villages in 1582. The creature that Tako battled was intended to be Godzilla but since Marvel no longer had the rights to the character, which lapsed the previous year, the creature was modified to a dragon called The Wani. Issue #8 featured the final Captain Marvel solo story before the character's death.

The second volume was cancelled after just 11 issues. In contrast to the original series, only one issue (#5) featured a new character, and none of them led to the featured character getting their own series. Jim Salicrup, who edited and/or did cover copy on most of the second volume, said that he was excited about reviving Marvel Spotlight, but that "it was probably a mistake to launch a new title with material from a recently canceled comic. I suspect that as an editor, I was hoping to give Captain Marvel another chance, but sometimes it's better to let things go. As a result, for the most part, the series seemed to exist just to burn off existing inventory".

In December 2005, the Marvel Spotlight title was used for a series of comic book–sized magazines, usually featuring profiles of and interviews with Marvel creators (one writer and one artist each issue), or spotlighting special Marvel projects such as Stephen King's The Dark Tower.

== Issues ==
=== Volume 1 (November 1971 – April 1977) ===
Issue	Featuring	Collected In
#1	Red Wolf (moved to own title)	
#2–4	Werewolf by Night (moved to own title)	Werewolf by Night Omnibus; Werewolf by Night Complete Collection Vol 1; Marvel Masterworks Werewolf by Night Vol. 1
#5–11	Ghost Rider (moved to own title)	Ghost Rider Epic Collection Vol 1; Marvel Masterworks Ghost Rider Vol. 1
#12-13	Son of Satan (moved to own title)	The Son of Satan Classic; Hellstrom: Evil Origins
#14–23	Son of Satan (moved to own title)	The Son of Satan Classic
#24	Son of Satan (moved to own title)	Marvel Horror Lives Again! Omnibus; The Son of Satan Classic
#25	Sinbad	
#26	Scarecrow	Marvel Horror Omnibus
#27	Sub-Mariner	Marvel Masterworks The Sub-Mariner Vol. 8; Namor, the Sub-Mariner Epic Collection Vol 5: Invasion of New York
#28–29	Moon Knight	Moon Knight Omnibus; Moon Knight Epic Collection Vol 1
#30	Warriors Three	Thor: The Warriors Three; Thor Epic Collection Vol 8; Marvel Masterworks The Mighty Thor Vol. 15; Thor Omnibus Vol 5
#31	Nick Fury: Agent of S.H.I.E.L.D.	Marvel Masterworks Nick Fury, Agent of S.H.I.E.L.D. Vol. 3; S.H.I.E.L.D.: The Complete Collection Omnibus
#32	Spider-Woman (moved to own title)	Marvel Masterworks Spider-Woman Vol 1; Spider-Woman Omnibus
#33	Deathlok and Devil-Slayer	Deathlok the Demolisher Complete Collection; Marvel Masterworks Deathlok Vol. 1

=== Volume 2 (July 1979 – March 1981) ===
Issue	Featuring	Collected In
#1–2	Captain Marvel	Marvel Premiere: The Death of Captain Marvel; Marvel Masterworks Captain Marvel Vol. 6; Guardians of the Galaxy Solo Classic Omnibus; The Death of Captain Marvel Omnibus
#3–4	Captain Marvel	Marvel Masterworks Captain Marvel Vol. 6; The Death of Captain Marvel Omnibus
#5	Dragon Lord	
#6–7	Star-Lord (origin)	Guardians of the Galaxy Solo Classic Omnibus
#8	Captain Marvel	Marvel Universe by Frank Miller Omnibus; The Death of Captain Marvel Omnibus
#9–11	Captain Universe	Captain Universe: Power Unimaginable

== Collected editions ==
- Essential Werewolf by Night Vol 1 includes Marvel Spotlight #2–4, 576 pages, October 2005, ISBN 978-0785118398
- Essential Ghost Rider Vol. 1 includes Marvel Spotlight #5–12, 560 pages, December 2006, ISBN 978-0785118381
- Essential Marvel Horror
  - Vol. 1 includes Marvel Spotlight #12–24, 648 pages, October 2006, ISBN 978-0785121961
  - Vol. 2 includes Marvel Spotlight #26, 616 pages, November 2008, ISBN 978-0785130673
- Essential Moon Knight Vol. 1 includes Marvel Spotlight #28–29, 560 pages, February 2006, ISBN 978-0785120926
- Siege Prelude includes Marvel Spotlight #30, 264 pages, January 2010, ISBN 978-0785143109
- Essential Spider-Woman Vol. 1 includes Marvel Spotlight #32, 576 pages, December 2005, ISBN 978-0785117933
- Marvel Masterworks: Deathlok Vol. 1 includes Marvel Spotlight #33, 368 pages, November 2009, ISBN 978-0785130505

== See also ==
- Marvel Premiere
