= Firebird (Marvel Comics) =

- Bonita Juarez / Firebird. Art by George Pérez.

Publication information
- Publisher: Marvel Comics
- First appearance: The Incredible Hulk vol. 2 #265 (August 1981)
- Created by: Bill Mantlo (writer); Sal Buscema (artist)

In-story information
- Alter ego: Bonita Juarez
- Species: Human mutate
- Team affiliations: Avengers West Coast; Secret Avengers; Rangers
- Notable aliases: La Espirita; Firebird
- Abilities: Immunity to poison, and radiation; Precognition; Pyrokinesis; Immortality; Flight

Firebird (Bonita Juarez) is a superhero character appearing in American comic books published by Marvel Comics. Created by writer Bill Mantlo and artist Sal Buscema, she first appeared in Incredible Hulk vol. 2 #265 (August 1981). At various points in her history, she has adopted the aliases of Pajaro Del Fuego, Firemaiden, and La Espirita. Firebird has associated with high-profile superheroes like Hank Pym and Hawkeye and been a member of the Rangers, the Avengers West Coast, and the Secret Avengers.

Firebird has been described by critics and commentators as one of Marvel's most notable and powerful female heroes, and a prominent Latina character.

== Publication history ==
Bonita Juarez debuted as part of the superhero team the Rangers in the story "You Get What You Need!" in Incredible Hulk vol. 2 #265 (August 1981), created by writer Bill Mantlo and artist Sal Buscema. She appeared in the 1985 West Coast Avengers series. She appeared in the 2009 Deadpool: Merc with a Mouth series. She appeared in the 2012 Scarlet Spider series.

== Fictional character biography ==
=== Origins ===
Bonita Juarez is a Mexican-American woman born in the fictional town of Buena Vista outside Albuquerque, New Mexico. A devout Roman Catholic and social worker, she was walking in the deserts outside her hometown when she came into contact with a radioactive meteorite fragment. The radiation altered her DNA and gave her the power to generate fire and fly. Believing her gifts came from God, she assumed the mythical bird's name and donned a costume.

As Firebird, she received a distress call from the Avengers and mistakenly battled the Hulk. She joined with other Southwestern heroes (forming a team called the Rangers) and fought the Corruptor, rescuing Rick Jones in the process, who had actually sent the signal.

=== West Coast Avengers ===
Firebird was alone when she fought against Master Pandemonium. Exhausted from her battle, she fell to the ground near the new Avengers Compound on the West Coast, where she was found by the Thing. She enlisted the aid of the Avengers in battling Master Pandemonium. She subsequently assisted the Avengers in several adventures, desperately seeking their invitation to join; however, their chairman Hawkeye remained oblivious, since he was trying to recruit the Thing.

Firebird accompanied the Avengers to the dimension of the Cat People. She battled her former teammate in the Rangers, the possessed Shooting Star, alongside the Avengers. She also faced Master Pandemonium again.

When Mockingbird discovered Firebird's desire to join, she tried coaxing her husband Hawkeye to invite her, but he continued holding out for the Thing (who did eventually decide to become a member, but ultimately backed out before making it official). Frustrated, Firebird left on a spiritual journey. Hawkeye later changed his mind, and the Avengers sought out Firebird but could not find her.

=== La Espirita ===
Firebird emerged from her retreat as the more religiously inspired La Espirita, arriving in the nick of time to stop Hank Pym's suicide attempt. With her help, Hank re-invented himself as the adventurer Doctor Pym and moved on from his past troubles. The two also shared a brief romance.

With Henry Pym and Moon Knight, Espirita rescued the Avengers who were trapped in the past. She later aided the Avengers against Dominus and Sunstroke. After joining the team on a few short adventures, she left to stand by Hank. Espirita later learns that she is seemingly immortal when the Collector fatally poisoned the other Avengers.

=== Firebird returns ===
Bonita was captured by a group of aliens from the planet Rus, who revealed that the meteorite that gave her powers was allegedly waste material from a discarded alien experiment of a pupil named Yoof. Accepting this revelation with humility, she nonetheless maintains faith in her powers being a gift from God, but more indirectly; she subsequently readopts the Firebird alias and returns to social work. She was later called in on various Avengers meetings, serving as a reservist when needed. At first, Bonita was not considered as an Avenger until she attended an all-membership meeting of the Avengers. After that she was called in on various Avengers events. She assisted Hellcat, Monica Rambeau, Moondragon, and Black Widow in subduing the Awesome Android, and encountered a small platoon of Atlanteans in Mexico getting help from a few Avengers. Firebird largely acts as a reserve member, preferring to spend her time as a social worker.

=== Rejoining Avengers ===
After the return of the main Avengers from the pocket universe created by Franklin Richards most of them were trapped in a curse created by Morgan Le Fay where she served in a guard called Queen's Vengeance under the name Firemaiden.

Her immunity to radiation later made her indispensable when a mysterious energy field engulfed a small Slavic country and turned everyone into zombies during the first blows of the Kang War. Firebird was one of the few individuals who could travel into the energy field without harm. Fellow Avenger Thor also surmised that Firebird may be immortal. When Captain America is briefly transformed into an energy zombie, Thor, briefly believing him dead, begins to fear that he has become too close to his mortal comrades despite his knowledge that he would outlive them when forced to face such vivid evidence of his allies' mortality, and contemplates leaving the Avengers after the war was over.

Although troubled by the implications of her own apparent immortality for her faith, Firebird helped him to see that the bonds between him and the Avengers were so valuable precisely because they wouldn't last forever and he shouldn't neglect them just because he would outlive them. In recognition of her advice, Thor toasted her when he arranged for Asgardian cooks to prepare a feast for the Avengers to celebrate Kang's defeat, commenting that she had taught a god a lesson by treating him as the fool he was.

=== Beyond! ===
Firebird reappears in the limited series Beyond! along with other Marvel characters. She is depicted in a somewhat more revealing costume that bares part of her midriff. She is also shown to have a romantic attraction to Henry Pym which manifests when she kisses him after he has an argument with the Wasp.

=== Civil War ===
After a vicious battle between Captain America's Secret Avengers and Iron Man's Pro-Registration forces during the Civil War, in which Bill Foster was killed by Ragnarok, Firebird, along with twenty other superheroes, joined the Secret Avengers in opposing the Superhuman Registration Act. Captain America's dialogue implies that the new members, including Firebird, are registered heroes who have nonetheless turned against Iron Man's forces because of the Bill Foster debacle. Weeks after the conclusion to the Civil War, Firebird is seen as one of the members of the revived Rangers, as part of the 50 States Initiative Program.

=== Secret Invasion ===
During the Secret Invasion storyline, Firebird was with the Rangers when they, Delroy Garrett / 3-D Man, and Eric O'Grady / Ant-Man were fighting a Skrull that was posing as Lobo, Red Wolf's wolf. The Rangers come into conflict with Kaine, alias Scarlet Spider in Houston, then they joined forces with him to battle a monster made of pure energy.

== Powers and abilities ==
Bonita Juarez acquired a range of superpowers due to bombardment by radiation from a meteorite containing energy waste from an alien's scientific equipment. She has the power of pyrokinesis, which enables her to mentally excite the atoms in an object until it spontaneously combusts. By using her powers to ignite the air around her, she can surround herself with an aura of flames that often takes the shape of a bird, and if she focuses her flames downwards in a tight stream, she can propel herself through the air like a rocket. She can channel her powers through her hands to seemingly project searing thermal blasts from her body (actually from her mind), capable of melting steel. She can fly by riding wind currents stirred up by the nimbus of fire with which she surrounds herself while flying. Although she can propel herself at superhuman speeds, she cannot breathe at those speeds without skin protection and an oxygen supply. Fatigue impairs her performance after approximately one hour of peak expenditure of power. She has also displayed a limited power of precognition, allowing her to have glimpses of the future.

Firebird also seems immune to most forms of radiation, poison, and even demonic possession, as well as the physical effects of her mental powers; she has also displayed the ability to survive in the vacuum of space. She may be immortal, but the precise details of this are unclear beyond the fact that she has twice survived apparently fatal attacks that only Thor—himself an immortal—could withstand.

== Reception ==
=== Critical response ===
Jason Wiese of CinemaBlend asserted, "Firebird is one of the most popular and important female Marvel superheroes of Latin origin." Deirdre Kaye of Scary Mommy called Firebird a "role model" and "truly heroic." Joseph Phillip Illidge of Comic Book Resources said, "Bonita may very well be the first mainstream Latina hero in American superhero comic books."

Isabelia Herrera of The New York Times included Firebird in their "5 Latinx Superheroes to Inspire Your New York Comic Con Look" list. Kara Hedash of The Mary Sue ranked Firebird 6th in their "7 Female Superheroes Who Should Join Marvel's Cinematic Universe" list, writing, "Bonita Juarez portrays Firebird and remains one of the most notable Latina superheroes." Pablo Valdivia of BuzzFeed ranked Firebird 7th in their "15 Incredible Latino Superheroes You Need To Know" list.

Screen Rant included Firebird in their "10 Iconic West Coast Avengers" list, in their "9 Strongest West Coast Avengers" list, and in their "10 Female Marvel Heroes That Should Come To The MCU" list. Anthony Avina of Comic Book Resources ranked Firebird 7th in their "10 Comic Characters We Hope To See Added To The MCU Avengers" list, 9th in their "13 Most Powerful Hispanic Heroes In Marvel Comics" list, and 11th in their "Marvel Comics: 15 Most Powerful Marvel Superheroes Who Control Fire" list.

== Other versions ==
- An alternate universe variant of Firebird from Earth-982 appears in A-Next #7.
- A zombified alternate universe variant of Firebird from Earth-2149 appears in Deadpool: Merc with a Mouth #11.
