= Deathlok =

Fictional character from Marvel Comics

Publication information
- Publisher: Marvel Comics
- First appearance: Astonishing Tales #25 (August 1974)
- Created by: Rich Buckler

In-story information
- Alter ego: Multiple characters
- Species: Human cyborg
- Team affiliations: S.H.I.E.L.D.; CIA; Wild Pack; Secret Defenders
- Notable aliases: Deathlok the Demolisher

Deathlok (also referred to as Deathlok the Demolisher) is the name of several fictional characters appearing in American comic books published by Marvel Comics. The first Deathlok, Luther Manning, appeared in Astonishing Tales #25 (Aug. 1974), created by Rich Buckler. At least five subsequent Marvel characters have used the "Deathlok" identity since then: Michael Collins, Jack Truman, Rebecca Ryker, Henry Hayes, and Jemma Simmons. A recurring theme among these characters is that a dead human has been reanimated with cybernetic technology. "Deathlok technology" has also been used thematically by Marvel writers in other stories.

The character has also appeared on television in animation and live action, with J. August Richards and Bill Paxton respectively portraying the original variations Mike Peterson and John Garrett in the television series Agents of S.H.I.E.L.D.

== Creation ==
Originally conceived as the main character in a novel, Rich Buckler got the opportunity to use the character within the comics medium. Development was put on a hold when Marvel Comics was negotiating for the comic book adaptation rights for the television series The Six Million Dollar Man, until Charlton Comics claimed the rights. Buckler then purchased a copy of the television series' source material Cyborg by Martin Caidin. Buckler stated, "So what I did was rethink part of it, and make sure things were the opposite...so while the Six Million Dollar Man was a good looking guy, I took that all away from Deathlok. I made him a monster and instead of being friends with technology he was enemies with it and then it developed from there. And it actually got deeper as a concept."

Buckler stated the character was an inversion of Captain America.

The original comic run makes numerous references to Mary Shelly's novel Frankenstein, a character whom Deathlok shares many parallels with.

== Publication history ==
Although initially announced as the new lead feature for Marvel's Worlds Unknown comic, under the title "Cyborg", the first Deathlok series ran in Astonishing Tales #25–28, 30–36 (cover-dated Aug. 1974–July 1976). This initial version of the character, Luther Manning, later guest-starred with Spider-Man in Marvel Team-Up #46 (June 1976), and the story from the cancelled Astonishing Tales comics was finished in Marvel Spotlight #33 (April 1977). Deathlok subsequently appeared with the Thing in Marvel Two-in-One #27 and 54. The Luther Manning Deathlok then appeared in Captain America #286–288 (Oct.-Dec. 1983).

A new Deathlok, Michael Collins, debuted in the miniseries Deathlok #1–4 (July–Oct. 1990, reprinted as Deathlok Special #1–4 the following year). This second Deathlok went on to a 34-issue series cover-dated July 1991 to April 1994, plus two summer Annuals in 1992 and 1993. The third Deathlok, S.H.I.E.L.D. espionage agent Jack Truman, debuted in an 11-issue miniseries (Sept. 1999–June 2000). Deathlok has also appeared in four issues of the miniseries Beyond!, and Michael Collins, in human form and not as Deathlok, appeared in Fantastic Four #544–545 (May–June 2007). Multiple unnamed Deathlok units appear in Black Panther vol. 4 #1–6. Possessing no human sentience, they were automatons created from corpses of soldiers killed in Iraq.

A new Deathlok named Henry Hayes debuted during the "Original Sin" event from Nathan Edmondson and Mike Perkins. While the character was considered to be an adaptation of the Marvel Cinematic Universe (MCU) portrayal of Deathlok, Mike Petersen, Edmondson stated that the coincidences were just "happy similarities" and that ultimately they tried to go for a total original concept. This Deathlok had his own ongoing series that began in October 2014.

A new Deathlok named Jemma Simmons, first appeared in S.H.I.E.L.D. vol. 3 #1 by Mark Waid and Carlos Pacheco, adapted from the MCU character of the same name, before becoming Deathlok in the sequel comic series Agents of S.H.I.E.L.D. #8, turned into one by Hayes to save her life.

== Fictional character biography ==
=== Luther Manning ===
Deathlok
- Cover of Astonishing Tales #25 (August 1974). Art by Rich Buckler and Klaus Janson

Publication information
- Publisher: Marvel Comics
- First appearance: Astonishing Tales #25 (August 1974)
- Created by: Rich Buckler

In-story information
- Alter ego: Luther Manning
- Species: Human cyborg
- Team affiliations: CIA
- Abilities: Cybernetic enhancements granting superhuman speed, strength, durability and reflexes Ability to repair bodily damage Ability to track multiple objects

Colonel Luther Manning is an American soldier from Detroit, Michigan, who, after being fatally injured, is reanimated as a cyborg by Simon Ryker in a post-apocalyptic future. He verbally communicates with his symbiotic computer, to which he refers as the abbreviated "'Puter". After escaping from Ryker's control, Manning battles the evil corporate and military regimes that have taken over the US, while simultaneously struggling to retain his humanity. He battles Ryker and the first Warwolf, and he encounters his wife and son for the first time after becoming a cyborg.

Deathlok battles the Devil-Slayer, but then battles demons alongside Devil-Slayer. He later becomes controlled by Mentallo and the Fixer and is sent to assassinate the President, but is stopped by the Thing and Nick Fury. After his capture he becomes catatonic, and is taken to England for treatment by the Thing. He is cured by Louis Kort, and Nick Fury takes him into custody. Deathlok is rebuilt by Roxxon as a robot and sent to sabotage Project Pegasus. The robot battles the Thing and Quasar, and self-destructs. The real Deathlok, now working for the Brand Corporation, battles Captain America and a time-traveling Luther Manning clone.

Deathlok eventually returns to his own time and overthrows the megalomaniac who had taken over the country. Manning remains in his near-future alternate reality, searching for a purpose in life and unable to disconnect himself from the machine bonded to him. Manning later returns to the present day, where he lives in solitude until he is apprehended by S.H.I.E.L.D.

=== John Kelly ===
Kelly first appeared as Deathlok in Marvel Comics Presents #62. This version of Deathlok was originally controlled by Kelly until its systems determined that Kelly's brain function was detrimental to its completion of the "First Run" program. The Deathlok unit then completed its mission. Kelly's brain was removed from the cyborg and disposed of. One of Simon Ryker's assistants took the brain presumably for use in the SIEGE unit. This version was made for the United States Army by Harlan Ryker, the CIA's Deathlok-program co-head and Ryker's brother, after studying Luther Manning's cyborg body. The Kelly Deathlok later became known as Siege.

=== Michael Collins ===
Deathlok

Publication information
- Publisher: Marvel Comics
- First appearance: Deathlok #1 (July 1990)
- Created by: Dwayne McDuffie; Gregory Wright; Jackson Guice

In-story information
- Alter ego: Michael Collins
- Species: Human cyborg
- Team affiliations: Wild Pack; Secret Defenders; S.H.I.E.L.D.
- Abilities: Cybernetic enhancements granting superhuman speed, strength, durability and reflexes Ability to repair bodily damage Ability to track multiple objects

Professor Michael Collins was born in Philadelphia, Pennsylvania. He was a pacifist working for the Roxxon cybernetics corporation Cybertek. Upon discovery of the Deathlok program, he is shot with a sedative by Harlan Ryker and his brain is transplanted into John Kelly's body. The machine is used against rebels fighting against Roxxon's influence in the fictional South American country of Estrella. Collins regains his consciousness during this mission and stops himself from killing a small child.

Although his brain was intended to serve only as a medium for the robot's programming, Collins is able to assert his will over it, installing a "no-killing parameter" into its programming. The computer is fully willing to listen to Collins, though he must take care to present his orders in a way that helps fulfill the mission and keep people from dying. Collins learns that his human body is still alive, and encounters Nick Fury and S.H.I.E.L.D.

In miniseries Beyond!, the cosmic being the Stranger (pretending to be the Beyonder) transports Collins to an alien planet, where he is forced to live for years until being rescued with the aid of several other heroes. However, his rescue requires the sacrifice of Greg Willis, the superhero known as Gravity. As an act of gratitude, Collins arranges Gravity's funeral.

=== Jack Truman/Larry Young ===
Deathlok

Publication information
- Publisher: Marvel Comics
- First appearance: As Jack Truman: Cable #59 (August 1998); As Deathlok: Deathlok #1 (September 1999)
- Created by: Joe Casey; José Ladrönn

In-story information
- Alter ego: Jack Truman; Larry Young
- Species: Human cyborg
- Team affiliations: S.H.I.E.L.D.
- Notable aliases: Agent 18 (Jack Truman)
- Abilities: Cybernetic enhancements granting superhuman speed, strength, durability and reflexes Ability to repair bodily damage Ability to track multiple objects

Jack Truman, also known as Agent 18, is an agent of the international espionage outfit S.H.I.E.L.D. who was transformed into a cyborg to battle the Red Skull. Through telepathic means, he swaps his consciousness with that of Larry Young, his rival and a former S.H.I.E.L.D. agent. Young is considered as a "potential recruit" for the Initiative program.

In the Vengeance mini-series, Truman is still trapped in Larry Young's body, while Young is unable to adapt to Truman's cyborg body. He is unable to function without appropriate maintenance, with his body seen rusting in a junk yard.

=== Project: Deathlok ===
During the "Dark Reign" storyline, a H.A.M.M.E.R. strike force consisting of corpses animated with crude bionics was sent to capture a super-soldier research center known as "The World". These models acted like traditional zombies, craving brains. Their mission was unsuccessful and as a result, the research group which produced them, called "Project: Deathlok", was scrapped.

=== Death Locket ===
In the Avengers Arena series, part of the Marvel NOW! event, a female teenage version of Deathlok dubbed Death Locket is introduced. She is revealed to be Rebecca Ryker, the daughter of Harlan Ryker. After being maimed in an explosion that killed her mother and brother, Rebecca was rebuilt using the Deathlok technology that her father developed. Arcade later kidnaps her alongside the students of the Avengers Academy and Braddock Academy and forces them to fight other teenage superhumans in his latest version of Murderworld.

=== Henry Hayes ===
Deathlok

Publication information
- Publisher: Marvel Comics
- First appearance: Original Sins #1 (June 2014)
- Created by: Nathan Edmondson; Mike Perkins

In-story information
- Alter ego: Henry Hayes
- Species: Human cyborg
- Team affiliations: United States Army; S.H.I.E.L.D.
- Abilities: Cybernetic enhancements granting superhuman speed, strength, durability and reflexes Ability to repair bodily damage Ability to track multiple objects

A new Deathlok debuted during the "Original Sin" storyline. Henry Hayes worked at Doctors Without Borders. During his duty, he lost a leg in a suicide bomber attack in Kandahar (or was brainwashed into thinking he did). Hayes was taken care of by the company Biotek, who provided him with a composite fiber prosthesis. Upon being placed under mind-control, Hayes became Deathlok, where he was used as an assassin, a soldier, a killer, a fighter, and an operative. He had participated in at least one armed conflict alongside organized troops, and assassinated countless people even in populated areas. Hayes was often memory-wiped and did not remember his assignments. While at MTA Metro-North station, he tried to engage discussion with another leg amputee and advised him to contact Biotek, as his own prosthesis forced the man to use crutches. This man left, seemingly displeased with the discussion. Immediately afterward, he met Seth Horne, an off-duty S.H.I.E.L.D. agent who was present when the Eye of the Watcher exploded, releasing a blast of energy which revealed deep secrets to anyone in its radius. To Horne, it revealed Hayes' true story. This level 4 agent wanted to congratulate him, stating that S.H.I.E.L.D. would wish to have him in their ranks. As Hayes really did not know what Horne was talking about, he threatened to call the authorities, forcing the agent to leave after a last congratulations. Immediately, Hayes was ordered to kill him as the announcement board of the station indicated the words "Whiskey David", triggering Hayes' Deathlok persona. After following Seth Horne into the restroom, Deathlok quickly executed him, left, took some medications, and returned to his civilian life.

=== Jemma Simmons ===
In the Agents of S.H.I.E.L.D. comic book, Jemma Simmons is transformed into a Deathlok by Henry Hayes to save her life after she is infected with an unknown substance and rendered comatose.

=== Deathloks of Lingares ===
During the "Iron Man 2020" event, Force Works encounters a group of Deathloks on the island of Lingares who overwhelm and capture them. War Machine is rescued by MODOK Superior, who is revealed to have created the Deathloks to help him gain control of Ultimo and transform into Ulti-MODOK. War Machine briefly transforms himself into a Deathlok to control the other Deathloks, who follow Ulti-MODOK into a lava-filled chasm.

== Powers and abilities ==
=== Manning ===
Col. Luther Manning's body was rebuilt into a cyborg body by Harlan Ryker. Deathlok's mechanical, cybernetic physiology granted him several superhuman powers including superhuman strength, stamina, agility, reflexes, and a computer augmented brain. The right arm and left half of his face are armored cybernetic implants. He wears a woven metal-mesh body suit of considerable durability. Deathlok also carried a helium-neon laser pistol designed by the U.S. Army of his time, and a throwing dagger. Manning was a military academy graduate, and a brilliant military strategist. He is a formidable hand-to-hand combatant, and proficient with knives, daggers, handguns, and laser pistols. He was later captured and upgraded by Earth-616's S.H.I.E.L.D. and given jet boots that allowed him to leap at great heights and his other abilities were perhaps enhanced to greater levels.

=== Collins ===
Michael Collins' human brain was transplanted into a cyborg body by a group of scientists at Cybertek. His cyborg body grants him the same powers as Manning, only with much greater strength, speed, and resistance to injury. He possesses a broad spectrum of visual and auditory powers. Deathlok has the ability to interface with virtually any computer system. He is also able to project his consciousness and sensory projections directly into the Net, making him capable of directly hacking computer systems far more efficiently than a traditional hacker. His body can also target (nearly infallibly) multiple objects and track them. He could scan the entire electromagnetic spectrum. He has learned to use internal nano-bots to repair and alter both his organic and inorganic parts, enabling him to appear as either a humanoid cyborg, or completely human. He also has a very sophisticated A.I., capable of quickly making complex strategies and evaluating their chance of success. If requested, the A.I. can take control of the body to perform these operations. Collins himself possesses no combat skills, but under computer-guided combat routines, he is an excellent hand-to-hand combatant with an extensive database of combat techniques and strategies.

Collins is an excellent computer programmer with an advanced degree in computer science and prosthetics, and helped construct the Deathlok body, along with other Cybertek scientists including William Hansen, Ben Jacobs, Stanley Cross, Dr. Hu, and Jim Dworman. After becoming Deathlok, Collins later modified his own systems. Like Manning, Collins wears a woven metal-mesh body suit of considerable durability. He carries a plasma pistol which draws its energy from his internal power source. Thus, the weapon can only be fired if in contact with the outlets in Deathlok's hand. Deathlok also possesses a collapsible plasma rifle capable of greater firepower with the same limitations, a supply of fragmentation plasma grenades, and a molybdenum steel knife. He wears a wrist bracelet that allows Deathlok to override similar cybernetic operating systems, and an adamantium/vibranium alloy shock dampening helmet. He sometimes uses a refitted Cybertek Dragonfly fighter with a range of several hundred miles.

== Other versions ==
=== Mutant X ===
An unidentified Deathlok appears in Mutant X as a member of the Avengers.

=== Deathlok-dominated future ===
An original incarnation of Deathlok, Ultron / Deathlok Prime, appears in Savage Avengers.

=== Abomination Deathlok ===
An original incarnation of Deathlok, Emil Blonsky / Abomination, from Earth-11045 appears in Uncanny Avengers as a member of Kang the Conqueror's Chronos Corps.

=== Ultimate Marvel ===
An alternate universe version of Luther Manning / Deathlok from Earth-1610 appears in Ultimate Spider-Man #70.

=== Deathlok Prime ===
An original, unnamed incarnation of Deathlok named Deathlok Prime appears in Uncanny X-Force and Wolverine and the X-Men.

=== X-Factor ===
An original incarnation of Deathlok, Steve Rogers, from Earth-22423 appears in X-Factor #231.

=== Amalgam ===
In the Amalgam Comics universe, Jason Todd was a young S.H.I.E.L.D. recruit mentored by Bruce Wayne and Moonwing. Despite his reckless nature, Dick chose Jason as his successor after temporarily leaving S.H.I.E.L.D. to attend college. Todd is caught in an explosion when the villain Hyena detonated a bomb intended to kill Bruce and Dark Claw. Todd was recovered by Hydra, who replaced his damaged body parts with robotic parts, transforming him into Deathlok.

=== Tomorrow Dies Today ===
An original incarnation of Deathlok from Earth-10511 appears in Weapon X.

== In other media ==
=== Television ===
- A team of Deathloks appear in the Black Panther episode "To the End".
- The Deathlok concept appears in Agents of S.H.I.E.L.D. as soldiers granted cybernetic abilities by Project Deathlok. The series' primary incarnation of Deathlok is Mike Peterson (portrayed by J. August Richards), who was enhanced with a variation of Extremis. After Phil Coulson's team manage to save his life and avert civilian casualties when he goes into a rampage, Peterson joins S.H.I.E.L.D. However, on a later mission, he is severely injured and captured by Project Centipede, a division of Hydra, and converted into a cyborg assassin. In the second season, Peterson is recaptured by Hydra, who remove his cybernetic parts.
  - In the episode "Ragtag", John Garrett is revealed to have been the first Deathlok.
- The Luther Manning incarnation of Deathlok appears in Hulk and the Agents of S.M.A.S.H., voiced by Mark Hildreth. This version is from a future where the Skrulls successfully invaded Earth, and was turned into a cyborg and sent back in time to change the timeline.

=== Film ===
In the early 1990s, a Deathlok film was at the script stage, with Randall Frakes as the screenwriter. Paramount Pictures bought the film rights in 2001, and hired Lee Tamahori to direct. Stu Zicherman and Raven Metzner were assigned as writers, while Avi Arad and Steven Paul would produce. In 2004, Paul McGuigan was being considered to replace Tamahori, while David Self provided rewrites. McGuigan later revealed that he was involved, but Marvel Studios put the film on a hiatus. He also praised Self's screenplay and that he envisioned Robert Downey Jr. for the villain role.

=== Video games ===
- The Michael Collins incarnation of Deathlok appears as an assist character in Spider-Man and Venom: Maximum Carnage.
- The MCU incarnation of Deathlok appears as a downloadable playable character in Lego Marvel's Avengers as part of the Agents of S.H.I.E.L.D. DLC pack.
- The Luther Manning incarnation of Deathlok appears as an unlockable playable character in Marvel Future Fight.
- The Henry Hayes incarnation of Deathlok appears as an unlockable playable character in Marvel Avengers Alliance 2.
- The Luther Manning incarnation of Deathlok appears in Marvel Snap.

=== Miscellaneous ===
Deathlok Prime appears in the Wolverine: Weapon X motion comic, voiced by Scott McNeil.

=== Merchandise ===
- In 1992, Toy Biz released a Deathlok action figure as part of its Marvel Super Heroes Cosmic Defenders line.
- In 1999, Toy Biz released a Spider-Man: Heroes Revenge box set featuring a Deathlok figure packaged alongside a Cyborg Spider-Man figure.
- A Marvel Legends action figure of Deathlok is part of the Galactus Series.
- In 2009, a new Deathlok figure was released alongside Iron Man 2020 in a Marvel Super Hero Squad two-pack.
- The Luther Manning incarnation of Deathlok is one of the figures in the Marvel Infinite Series, an extension of the Marvel Universe toyline.
- In 2018, Marvel Legends released another Deathlok figure as part of the Deadpool (Sasquach Build-a-Figure) Wave
- In 2019, Marvel Legends re-released the 2018 Deathlok figure, repainted to represent the character's appearance in Uncanny X-Force. This version is a Fan Channel exclusive and not part of any Build-A-Figure wave.

== In popular culture ==
- In an interview, artist George Pérez described Deathlok inspiring him during the creation of the DC Comics character Cyborg. "In the case of Cyborg I was inspired visually - and I think it is obvious from the head - by Deathlok... then I decided to make him more robotic than android by making more metallic parts of him, so that he wasn't quite as human... but the half-face metallic plate was obviously inspired by Deathlok by Rich Buckler."
- "Psychotron" by Megadeth (from the album Countdown to Extinction, 1992) was inspired by the Deathlok character.

== Collected editions ==
Title	Material collected	Pages	Publication Date	ISBN
Captain America: Deathlok Lives	Captain America #286–288	64	1993	0-7851-0019-9
Marvel Masterworks: Deathlok Volume 1	Astonishing Tales #25–28 and #30–36; Marvel Spotlight #33; Marvel Team-Up #46; Marvel Two-In-One #27 and #54; Captain America #286–288	352	November 2009	0-7851-3050-0
Deathlok the Demolisher: The Complete Collection	Astonishing Tales #25–28 and #30–36; Marvel Team-Up #46; Marvel Spotlight #33; Marvel Two-In-One #27 and #54; Captain America #286–288	368	October 2014	0-7851-9112-7
Deathlok: The Living Nightmare Of Michael Collins	Deathlok #1–4	216	June 2012	0-7851-5988-6
Deathlok: The Souls Of Cyber-Folk	Deathlok (vol. 2) #1–15 and Annual #1	400	January 2015	0-7851-9334-0
Deathlok: Rage Against The Machine	Deathlok (vol. 3) #1–11; Cable #58–62; Uncanny X-Men #371; X-Men (vol. 2) #91; X-Men Annual '99	456	February 2015	978-0-7851-9291-6
Deathlok: The Demolisher	Deathlok (vol. 4) #1–7	176	January 2011	0-7851-2828-X
Deathlok Vol. 1: Control. Alt. Delete.	Deathlok (vol. 5) #1–5; Original Sins #1	120	June 2015	0-7851-9278-6
Deathlok Vol. 2: Man Versus Machine	Deathlok (vol. 5) #6–10	112	October 2015	978-0785192794
