= Space Phantom =

Fictional comic book villain

Publication information
- Publisher: Marvel Comics
- First appearance: The Avengers vol. 1, #2 (November 1963)
- Created by: Stan Lee (writer); Jack Kirby (artist)

Characteristics
- Place of origin: Limbo
- Inherent abilities: Knowledge of sophisticated alien technology; Advanced knowledge of time and time travel; Shapeshifting

Space Phantom is the name of several characters who belong to a fictional species appearing in American comic books published by Marvel Comics. Created by writer Stan Lee and artist Jack Kirby, Space Phantom first appeared in The Avengers vol. 1 #2 (November 1963). A Space Phantom is a being who was transformed by staying in the Limbo dimension too long. They started as adversaries of the superhero team the Avengers.

== Publication history ==
The Space Phantoms debuted in The Avengers vol. 1 #2 (November 1963), and were created by Stan Lee and Jack Kirby. They appeared in the 1966 Thor series, and in the 1998 Avengers Forever series.

== Fictional character biography ==
The Space Phantoms were originally various beings who became trapped in Limbo, were transformed into monsters and rendered amnesiac by its effects, and were conditioned to become servants of Immortus. For many years, it was assumed that there was only one Space Phantom, but in the course of the Destiny War the Avengers discovered that there were multiple. During a journey back in time to 1873, a trio of Space Phantoms was caught impersonating the Gunhawks and the Black Rider. The Space Phantoms were previously said to have originated on the planet Phantus in the Phalbo system in the Milky Way Galaxy.

Immortus traps individuals who become lost in Limbo, and due to the nature of that plane, they begin to forget their former lives and change into misshapen beings. Immortus conditions these into servants who can perpetuate his schemes and manipulations of historical events. The Phantoms can assimilate anyone, even to the point of torture and escaping notice of even mind-readers.

The first Space Phantom is introduced in The Avengers #2, where he assumes the form of Giant-Man, Iron Man, and Hulk. During his battle with the Avengers, he first copies the Hulk, and battles Iron Man. He transforms into a flying insect to escape, but Iron Man continues to battle the Hulk. The Space Phantom attacks the Wasp in his insect form, and then transforms into Giant-Man. After fighting Iron Man, he takes Iron Man's form. The Space Phantom finally attempts to copy Thor and is returned to Limbo because his powers cannot affect Asgardians.

Since all Space Phantoms appear identical and can appear as any other creature, it can be difficult to determine which Space Phantom did what; the following activities have previously been attributed to the Space Phantom who first encountered the Avengers, but these may not have been the same Space Phantom. A Space Phantom allied with the Grim Reaper and impersonated Madame Hydra, and commanded a division of Hydra in that identity. The Space Phantom battled the Avengers, but was shunted back into Limbo when he attempted to mimic Rick Jones, who was then linked to Mar-Vell. A Space Phantom was compelled by Immortus to impersonate Mantis to deceive Kang. A Space Phantom attempted to trick Thor into freeing the planet Phantus from Limbo, and allied with Thor to save Phantus, which led to Thor losing Mjolnir's power over time. A Space Phantom once encountered Rom the Space Knight in Limbo. A Space Phantom later encountered the Avengers in Limbo. A Space Phantom was used as a pawn by the Young God Calculus in a scheme pitting Spider-Man against the Avengers.

The original Space Phantom is revealed to be disguised as Spider-Man in Beyond!.

Kurt Busiek used Space Phantoms and Immortus in Avengers Forever to explain a number of inconsistencies such as the Avengers crossover titled The Crossing.

== Powers and abilities ==
A Space Phantom can assume the form of virtually any single object or living creature at a time, trapping the real entity in Limbo until they switch forms. They have no difficulty imitating a number of people in rapid succession, nor does there appear to be a time limit on the period in which he can imitate someone. A Space Phantom appears to be unable to duplicate certain powerful beings who possess magical enchantments; when he attempts to duplicate such a being he is shunted into Limbo instead. While in the form of another creature, the Space Phantom gains all the abilities of that creature. It can even become an object that travels faster than light.

Additionally, a Space Phantom has knowledge of sophisticated alien technology far in advance of present-day Earth and advanced knowledge of time and time travel.

== In other media ==
- A Space Phantom appears in The Marvel Super Heroes, voiced by Gillie Fenwick.
- The Space Phantoms appear in The Super Hero Squad Show episode "Revenge of the Baby Sat!", voiced by Tom Kenny.
- The Space Phantoms appear in the Avengers Assemble episode "Ghost of a Chance", voiced by David Kaye, with duplicate forms voiced by Troy Baker, Travis Willingham, Roger Craig Smith, Laura Bailey, and Adrian Pasdar. This version of the species possess a black, gaseous appearance.
- A Space Phantom appears in Rocket & Groot, voiced by Kevin Michael Richardson.
