= Master Pandemonium =

- Master Pandemonium as depicted on the cover of The West Coast Avengers vol. 2 #9 (June 1986). Art by Al Milgrom and by Joe Sinnott.

Publication information
- Publisher: Marvel Comics
- First appearance: The West Coast Avengers vol. 2 #4 (January 1986)
- Created by: Steve Englehart; Al Milgrom

In-story information
- Alter ego: Martin Preston
- Species: Human mutate
- Abilities: Ability to summon demons and turn limbs into demons with fangs, claws, and wings; Knowledge of demon lore and certain rites of magic

Master Pandemonium (Martin Preston) is a supervillain appearing in American comic books published by Marvel Comics. Created by writer Steve Englehart and artist Al Milgrom, the character first appeared in The West Coast Avengers vol. 2 #4 (January 1986). Originally an actor, Preston made a pact with Mephisto to replace his lost arm, only to have all of his limbs replaced with demons.

== Publication history ==
Martin Preston debuted in The West Coast Avengers vol. 2 #4 (January 1986), created by writer Steve Englehart and artist Al Milgrom. He appeared in the Young Avengers Presents series.

== Fictional character biography ==
Martin Preston was born in Rutland, Vermont. He was originally an actor who lost an arm in a car crash, and made a pact with Mephisto to regain his limb. Mephisto instead replaces all of Preston's limbs with demonic grafts and gives him a hole in his chest in the shape of an inverted star.

Master Pandemonium is told that his soul has been split into five fragments and battles the West Coast Avengers while seeking to reclaim the fragments. Master Pandemonium abducts and absorbs Thomas and William, the "children" of the Vision and the Scarlet Witch, who are actually two of the soul fragments he sought. After Master Pandemonium gathers the fragments, Mephisto reveals that the fragments are actually portions of his own soul.

Young Avengers members Speed and Wiccan, the reincarnations of Scarlet Witch's children, encounter Master Pandemonium in their mother's former home in Leonia, New Jersey while searching for her. He has reverted to a more human look, and claims to be in hiding due to the belief that his schemes contributed to the Scarlet Witch's breakdown. After a brief battle, Wiccan and Speed determine that Master Pandemonium is not an active threat and leave peacefully.

== Powers and abilities ==
Master Pandemonium possesses the power to summon demons and turn limbs into demons, having fangs, claws, and wings. He is able to separate the demons from his body at will, leaving him without the corresponding limbs until they return to him. He also has a great knowledge of demonic lore and certain rites of magic.

== Reception ==
Darby Harn of Screen Rant called Martin Preston "one of the best Scarlet Witch comics characters."

== In other media ==
Master Pandemonium appears in M.O.D.O.K., voiced by Jordan Blum. This version is the host of the morning talk show Morning with Master Pandemonium.
