= Sal Buscema =

American comic book artist (1936–2026)

- Buscema in 1971
- Born: Silvio Buscema; January 26, 1936 New York City, U.S.
- Died: January 24, 2026 (aged 89) Gainesville, Virginia, U.S.
- Areas: Penciller, Inker
- Notable works: Captain America; The Defenders; The Incredible Hulk; Marvel Team-Up; Rom: Spaceknight; The Spectacular Spider-Man; Thor
- Awards: Inkpot Award 2003; Hero Initiative Lifetime Achievement Award 2013; Inkwell SPAMI Award 2013 & 2018; Inkwell Awards Stacey Aragon Special Recognition Award (SASRA); Inkwell Awards Joe Sinnott Hall of Fame Award (2021); Ringo Award (2022)

Silvio Buscema (/bjuːˈsɛmə/ bew-SEM-ə; Italian: [ˈsilvjo buʃˈʃɛːma]; January 26, 1936 – January 24, 2026) was an American comics artist, primarily for Marvel Comics, where he had a ten-year run as artist of The Incredible Hulk and an eight-year run as artist of The Spectacular Spider-Man. He was the younger brother of comics artist John Buscema.

== Early life, family and education ==
Born in Brooklyn, New York City, on January 26, 1936, to Sicilian parents, Silvio "Sal" Buscema was the youngest of four siblings. His father, who was born in Italy and died in 1973, was a barber. Sal's brothers were Alfred and John, a celebrated comic book artist, and his sister was Carol.

As a youth, Buscema was a fan of Hal Foster's Prince Valiant comic strip, of George Tuska's comic book art, and of commercial illustrators such has Robert Fawcett and Norman Rockwell. He acknowledged that his artist brother John was "greatly responsible for me pursuing drawing. ... John was definitely an inspiration".

John and Sal attended the High School of Music & Art; Sal graduated in 1955.

== Career ==
=== Early years ===
Buscema began working in the comic book industry as an inker in the early 1950s when his brother agreed to let him ink comics pages; this led to Sal helping John by doing occasional background art on Dell Comics series John was drawing.

After high school, Buscema found work at "a small, two-man advertising art studio in Manhattan" but was fired after three months of doing mostly production work. He went on to a larger commercial-art studio, where he was a gofer and a delivery person. He quit, then spent less than a year filling wedding-ring orders for the jewelry manufacturer J.R. Wood and Sons before being drafted into the peacetime U. S. Army in 1956. Classified as an "illustrator", he served with the Army Corps of Engineers stationed at Fort Belvoir in Virginia. He spent 21 months doing film strips and charts as training aids before being discharged. He attained the rank of specialist 3rd class, which he called "equivalent to corporal."

Buscema briefly returned to New York City to assist at a one-man art studio, but through a friend from the army, he secured a position at Creative Arts Studio in Washington, D.C. where he did illustrations for government agencies, including the Department of Agriculture and the Department of Defense. After living with his godparents for three months, Buscema and an Army buddy became roommates in Alexandria, Virginia.

In 1961, a call from his brother John brought Buscema to New York City to work with him at the advertising agency Alexander Chaite, Inc. After a year and a half, John returned to the comic book industry. Sal joined Mel Emde, a friend and colleague from Creative Arts Studio, who was opening his own company, Design Studio. Sal worked there until 1968.

=== Marvel Comics ===
In 1968, Buscema began working for Marvel Comics, where John was already established as a freelance artist. Buscema had spent "every night for about a year" teaching himself "how to produce a dynamic page" in the Marvel Comics storytelling style, enduring harsh critiques from John. Sal recalled in the late 2000s:

Once I got the hang of it I made up ... six sample pages of pencils [i.e. penciled, uninked art pages], which I regret, because I wanted to be an inker. I didn't want to pencil. My first few jobs for Marvel were inking jobs, but I did those while working for Design Center. I wanted to work full-time for Marvel, so it was out of necessity that I penciled. [Editor-in-chief Stan Lee] loved [the samples]. He asked me to come on up to New York, which I did, and I went through the most fantastic interview of my life. Stan was leaping on his chair and his desk, just to relate to me physically what he wanted on a comic-book page. It was fascinating and it was charming all at the same time. He made the sound effects, the whole nine yards. ... He demonstrated every other way you could possibly demonstrate what he wanted on those pages—the dynamics and so on.

The interview had come about after Buscema, at his brother's urging, had first written to Marvel production manager Sol Brodsky to introduce himself and his work. Brodsky had no assignments for him at the time, and Buscema "called him a couple of times just to bug him a little bit and let him know that I was still alive, and eventually the first job came through" in June 1968 — the 10-page Western feature "Gunhawk". "I think they just said, 'Sal, here's the plot, go to it,'" Buscema recalled in 2003. That story, "The Coming of Gunhawk", by writer Jerry Siegel and penciler Werner Roth, was published in the omnibus title Western Gunfighters #1 (cover-dated Aug. 1970). Sal's first published comics work had come before that: inking John Buscema's pencil art on four 39- to 40-page stories in the superhero comic The Silver Surfer #4–7 (Feb.–Aug. 1969); and inking Larry Lieber's pencils on the regular-sized, 20-page Western The Rawhide Kid #68 (Feb. 1969).

John Buscema specifically asked for his brother as inker on The Silver Surfer, at the time a high-profile project dear to writer-editor Lee, who gave the character an unprecedented for the time double-sized, 64-page (with ads and covers) solo series priced at 25 cents, more than twice the price of the standard 32-page, 12-cent comic. Sal Buscema recalled,

Joe Sinnott inked the first three Silver Surfer [issues]. John was not happy with the inking Joe was doing ... because Joe's style of inking was somewhat overpowering, and at the end it ... didn't look like John Buscema anymore.... John told [Stan], 'I don't want Joe inking my work. He's losing my penciling.' ... He said, 'I want my brother' ...[H]e knew that I knew how to ink his work. He was a little spotty on my first issue, but after that he was absolutely delighted with what I did.

Within a year, Buscema was penciling the superhero-team comic The Avengers, and for the next thirty years, he was one of the most prolific artists at the company. He recalled in the late 2000s, "At first I was very slow. If I knocked out six or eight pages a week I was happy. Then I started getting a little bit better, and I could probably do a couple of pages a day. But once I hit that five-year transitional period, I was like a machine. I could grind the stuff out. ... Everything just fell into place, and all of a sudden I found it very easy to do."

Buscema and writer Roy Thomas introduced the Squadron Sinister in The Avengers #69 (Oct. 1969) as a homage to the Justice League. The Thomas/Buscema team produced the last new story in The Uncanny X-Men before that series became all-reprints for several years, and created the super-villain Llyra in Sub-Mariner #32 (Dec. 1970). Buscema drew an Avengers story plotted by science fiction writer Harlan Ellison, which featured the debut of Psyklop. Writer Steve Englehart and Buscema launched Defenders as an ongoing series in August 1972 and introduced Valkyrie to the team in issue #4 (Feb. 1973). Buscema also worked with Englehart on Captain America; their 1972–1975 run on that title saw it become one of Marvel's top-sellers. The pair teamed on several issues of The Avengers as well and Englehart has described Buscema as being one of his "all-time favorites" and "a perfect comic book storyteller." With writer Steve Gerber, Buscema co-created Starhawk, adding the character to the roster of the future-based super-team, the Guardians of the Galaxy. (Note: Note that this version of the Guardians, created by Arnold Drake and Gene Colan in 1969, was a different team than that portrayed in the Marvel Cinematic Universe.) In 2010, Comics Bulletin ranked Buscema's collaboration with Gerber on The Defenders first on its list of the Top 10 1970s Marvels.

With writer Bill Mantlo, Buscema created the supporting character Jean DeWolff in Marvel Team-Up #48 (Aug. 1976). Mantlo, a frequent collaborator, later said that Buscema was a formative influence on his plotting. Buscema was the original artist on The Spectacular Spider-Man, which debuted in December 1976. He and Jim Shooter created Graviton in The Avengers #158 (April 1977). The Rom series was launched by Mantlo and Buscema in December 1979. The Mantlo/Buscema collaboration on The Incredible Hulk included the creation of the U-Foes and the Soviet Super-Soldiers. Buscema had a 10-year run on that Hulk series, which he described as "[p]robably one of the most enjoyable experiences of my career. The fact that the Hulk was my all-time favorite character might be a contributing factor. I never tired of the character. Every story was a new challenge." He became the artist on New Mutants, beginning with issue #4 (June 1983). Beginning in the late 1970s, Buscema generally inked his own work. In 1986, he began drawing Thor, working with writer Walt Simonson. In the late 1980s, he returned to inking others' work, again including that of his brother John Buscema on an Englehart-scripted run on Fantastic Four.

=== Later career ===
From 1988 through 1996, he penciled and mostly inked a 100-issue run on The Spectacular Spider-Man. This included such story arcs as the "Lobo Brothers Gang War" with Gerry Conway and "The Child Within", written by J. M. DeMatteis, featuring the death of Harry Osborn in #200 (May 1993). In a 2002 interview, DeMatteis said, "I really loved the two years on Spectacular Spider-Man that I wrote with Sal Buscema drawing. Talk about underrated! Sal is one of the best storytellers and a wonderful collaborator. I loved that run."

From 1997 to 1999, Buscema worked for rival DC Comics, including penciling Batman, Superman, and Superboy stories, and inking the Creeper, Wonder Woman, and other characters' stories. He recalled, "[T]he short time I worked for DC, they were giving me all these young guys that could hardly hold a pencil in their hands, and asking me to 'tweak it.' In cases like that I would definitely put a lot of myself into it and change whatever I felt needed to be changed."

Buscema then returned to Marvel, inking Pat Olliffe on Spider-Girl 1999, the summer annual of that series, and did work for both companies briefly before becoming the regular inker on The Incredible Hulk vol. 3, #11–20 (Feb.–Nov. 2000) and inking a smattering of other titles. In 2003, he described himself as "retired for three years ... and I'm still inking jobs for Marvel!" That same year he returned to comics full-time, inking Oliffe on Spider-Girl #55 (March 2003) and then launching into a long stint inking or doing finished art over pencil layouts by Ron Frenz from issues #59–100 (June 2003 – Sept. 2006). He continued to ink the series when it was relaunched as The Amazing Spider-Girl #1–30 (Dec. 2006 – May 2009). He inked Spider-Girl stories over Frenz's pencils in the omnibus title Web of Spider-Man vol. 2, #1–7 (Dec. 2009 – June 2010) and in the four-issue miniseries The Spectacular Spider-Girl vol. 2 (July–Oct. 2010) and the one-shot Spider-Girl: The End! #1 (Oct. 2010). In 2011, he was the inker, over Frenz, on the five-issue superhero miniseries Thunderstrike vol. 2.

He returned to DC Comics in 2011 with DC Retroactive: The Flash – The '70s and a Superman one-shot, Superman Beyond. In 2012, Buscema inked IDW Publishing's G.I. Joe Annual and the ongoing Dungeons and Dragons: Forgotten Realms series.

In 2017, he started inking long-time collaborator Ron Frenz on The Blue Baron, written by Darin Henry and published by the new company Sitcomics. Buscema collaborated with Tom DeFalco and Ron Frenz on The R.I.G.H.T. Project for Apex Comic Group. The one-shot comic book was crowdfunded via Indiegogo and sent to its backers in February 2022.

== Personal life and death ==
In February 1959, Buscema started dating Joan, a secretary at Creative Arts Studio in Washington, D.C., where he worked. They married in May 1960. Their first son, Joe, was born in 1968, followed by Tony and Mike.

Buscema acted in community theatre. He was recognized in 1987 with BRAPA (Blue Ridge Alliance of Performing Arts) for his portrayal of Tevye in Fiddler on the Roof in which he appeared at the Little Theatre of Alexandria, Virginia in 1998.

Buscema died in Gainesville, Virginia, on January 24, 2026, at the age of 89, two days before his 90th birthday.

== Awards ==
Buscema received the Inkpot Award in 2003 and the Hero Initiative Lifetime Achievement Award in September 2013 at the Baltimore Comic-Con. In 2013, Buscema received the Inkwell Awards' S.P.A.M.I. (Favorite Small Press and Mainstream-Independent) Award for his work on such titles as G.I. Joe Annual and Dungeons and Dragons: Forgotten Realms. In 2018, he was awarded the Inkwell Awards S.P.A.M.I. Award again, for his work on Rom. Buscema was awarded the Inkwell Awards Stacey Aragon Special Recognition Award (SASRA) in 2020. In 2021 Buscema was awarded the Inkwell Awards Joe Sinnott Hall of Fame Award for his inking career. In 2022, Sal Buscema won the Ringo Award as best inker for his work on Heroes Union #1.

== Bibliography ==
Comics work (interior art) includes:

=== Apex Comics Group ===
- The R.I.G.H.T. Project #1 (inker) (2022)

=== Big Bang ===
- National Guardians #1–2 (inker) (2012, 2015)

=== Binge Books (Sitcomics) ===
- The Blue Baron #1–3 (inker) (2017–2020)
- Heroes Union #1 (inker, with Chris Nye) (2021)

=== DC Comics ===
- Action Comics #759 (inker) (1999)
- The Adventures of Superman #572 (inker) (1999)
- The Adventures of Superman vol. 2 #2 (inker) (2013)
- Batman #553–555, 557–559, 1,000,000, Annual #24 (inker) (1998–2000)
- Batman 80-Page Giant #1 (inker); #2 (artist) (1998–1999)
- Batman and Superman: World's Finest #9 (inker) (1999)
- The Batman Chronicles #8, 13–14 (penciller); #16 (inker) (1997–1999)
- Batman: Day of Judgment #1 (inker) (1999)
- Batman/Scarecrow 3-D #1 (inker) (1998)
- Batman: Shadow of the Bat #89 (inker) (1999)
- Batman:Toyman #3 (inker) (1999)
- Catwoman #50 (inker) (1997)
- Creeper, vol. 3, #1–7, 9–11, 1,000,000 (inker); #8 (penciller) (1998)
- DC Comics Presents: Green Lantern #1 (inker) (2004)
- DC Retroactive: The Flash – The '70s #1 (inker) (2011)
- DC Universe Holiday Bash #1 (artist); #2 (inker) (1997–1998)
- Detective Comics #727–729, 733, 741 (inker); Annual #10 (penciller) (1998–2000)
- Green Arrow #122, 124, 129–130 (inker) (1997–1998)
- Legends of the DC Universe 80-Page Giant #1 (inker) (1998)
- Robin #46 (inker) (1997)
- Speed Force #1 (inker) (1997)
- Steel #47 (inker) (1998)
- Superboy, vol. 3, #37, 42–44 (penciller) (1997)
- Superman vol. 2 #149 (inker) (1999)
- Superman Beyond #0 (inker) (2011)
- Superman: The Man of Steel #65 (penciller); #94 (inker) (1997–1999)
- Wonder Woman Secret Files #1 (inker) (1998)
- Young Heroes in Love #17 (inker) (1998)

=== IDW Publishing ===
- Dungeons & Dragons: Forgotten Realms #1–2, 4–5 (inker) (2012)
- G.I. Joe: A Real American Hero #177, 182, Annual 2012 (inker) (2012)
- Rom: Dire Wraiths #1–3 side story (artist) (2020)

=== Marvel Comics ===
- Alpha Flight #33–34 (penciller) (1986)
- Amazing Adventures #6 (inker) (1971)
- Amazing Fantasy #15 (inker) (2006)
- Amazing Spider-Girl #1–30 (inker) (2006–2009)
- The Amazing Spider-Man #94–95 (inker); #154–155, 198–199, 266, 272 (penciller); #700 (inker); Annual #25 (artist) (1971–1991, 2013)
- The Amazing Spider-Man vol. 5 #54.LR (artist, four pages), #74 (artist, one page) (2021)
- The Amazing Spider-Man Family #1–2, 5–8 (inker) (2008–2009)
- The Amazing Spider-Man: Sins Rising Prelude #1 (artist, two pages) (2020)
- Astonishing Tales #10 (inker) (1972)
- The Avengers #68–72, 78, 86–92, 127–134, 156, 158–159, 169, 172–173, 193, 227 (penciller) (1969–1983)
- Balder the Brave #1–4 (artist) (1985–1986)
- Battlestar Galactica #8–9, 18 (penciller) (1979–1980)
- Black Knight #1 (inker) (2010)
- Buzz #1–3 (inker) (2000)
- Captain America #114–115 (inker); #146–163, 165–181, 185, 188, 218–223, 225–237, 284–285 (penciller) (1969–1983)
- Captain America, vol. 3, #50 (penciller, among others) (2002)
- Chamber of Darkness #6 (penciller) (1970)
- Conan the Barbarian #2–4, 6, 9–11, 13–15, 23, 25 (inker); #92 (penciller) (1970–1978)
- Daredevil #107 (inker); #139–140, 218, 238 (penciller) (1974–1986)
- Defenders #1–29, 31–41, 62–64, 119, 127, 148, Annual #1 (penciller) (1972–1985)
- Defenders vol. 2 #5, 7, 10–11 (inker) (2001)
- Doctor Strange vol. 2 #75 (penciller) (1986)
- Eternals vol. 2 #1–9 (penciller) (1985–1986)
- Fantastic Four #182–183, 190, 207–208 (penciller); #297–302 (inker); #313, Annual #13 (penciller) (1977–1988)
- Fantastic Four Roast (artist, among others) (1982)
- Ghost Rider #11 (penciller) (1975)
- Heroes for Hope #1 (inker, among others) (1985)
- Hulk Smash Avengers #1 (inker) (2012)
- The Incredible Hulk vol. 2 #124, 134–136 (inker); #194–203, 205–217, 219–221, 223–229, 231–240 (penciller); #241–243, 245–248, 250–273 (artist); #274–278, 280–309, Annual #5, 8 (penciller); Annual #14–15 (artist) (1970–1986)
- The Incredible Hulk vol. 3 #5 (artist); #8–20 (inker) (1999–2000)
- The Incredible Hulk vs. Quasimodo one-shot (penciller) (1983)
- The Immortal Iron Fist #4 (penciller, among others) (2007)
- Iron Man #129, 198, Annual #3 (penciller) (1979–1985)
- Iron Age #2 (inker) (2011)
- J2 #9 (inker) (1999)
- John Carter, Warlord of Mars Annual #1 (penciller) (1977)
- Journey into Mystery #512–513 (penciller) (1997)
- Kickers, Inc. #1 (inker) (1986)
- Kull the Conqueror vol. 2 #8 (penciller) (1985)
- Magik #4 (penciller) (1984)
- Marvel Comics Super Special (Kiss) #1 (penciller, among others) (1977)
- Marvel Feature #2 (inker) (1972)
- Marvel Graphic Novel: The Pitt (penciller) (1988)
- Marvel: Heroes & Legends #1 (penciller) (1996)
- Marvel Knights 4 #21 (inker) (2005)
- Marvel Holiday Special #1 (Thor), #4 (X-Men) (artist) (1991–1994)
- Marvel Premiere #6 (Doctor Strange) (inker), #49 (Falcon) (penciller) (1973–1979)
- Marvel Preview #19 (Kull the Conqueror) (penciller) (1979)
- Marvel Spotlight #20–24 (Son of Satan), #32 (Spider-Woman) (penciller) (1975–1977)
- Marvel Team-Up #20–22, 32–46, 48–52, 56–58, 82–85, 88, 130, 132–133, Annual #1–2 (penciller) (1974–1983)
- Marvel Treasury Edition #12 (Howard the Duck/The Defenders) (penciller) (1976)
- Marvel Two-in-One (Thing team-ups) #3–5, 7–8, 17, 19–20, 24, 42, Annual #1, 3 (penciller) (1974–1978)
- Master of Kung Fu #32, 41 (penciller) (1975–1976)
- Ms. Marvel #10–12 (penciller) (1977)
- My Love #1, 4, 6, 18 (inker) (1969–1972)
- New Avengers #8 (artist, with Steve McNiven) (2005)
- New Mutants #4–17, 54 (penciller) (1983–1987)
- Nova #3–14 (penciller) (1976–1977)
- Our Love Story #4 (inker); #15–16 (penciller) (1970–1972)
- Power Man #31 (penciller) (1976)
- Power Man and Iron Fist #53 (penciller) (1978)
- Pro Action Magazine #1 (promo) (artist) (1994)
- The Rampaging Hulk #3, 9 (penciller) (1977–1978)
- Rawhide Kid #68 (inker) (1968)
- Red Sonja #14 (penciller) (1979)
- Rom #1–17, 19 (artist); #18, 20–55, 57–58, Annual #2 (penciller) (1979–1984)
- Savage Sword of Conan #37, 39, 44, 116 (penciller) (1979–1985)
- Sensational Spider-Man: Self-Improvement #1 (inker) (2019)
- She-Hulk #9 (inker) (2006)
- Silver Surfer #4–7 (inker) (1969)
- Skull the Slayer #4–8 (penciller) (1976)
- The Spectacular Scarlet Spider #1–2 (penciller) (1995)
- The Spectacular Spider-Man #1–5, 7–10, 12–20, 38, 134, 155–159, 219–238, Annual #4, 14 (penciller); #135–154, 160–212, 215–218 (artist); #213 (inker) (1976–1996)
- Spider-Girl #1/2, #18, 50, 55, 59, 61–79, 81–100, Annual '99 (inker) (1999–2006)
- Spider-Girl: The End #1 (inker) (2010)
- Spider-Man: Funeral for an Octopus #3 (inker) (1995)
- Spider-Man Super Special #1 (inker) (1995)
- Spider-Man Team-Up #7 (penciller) (1997)
- Spider-Man Unlimited #11 (artist) (1996)
- Star Wars #93, 102 (penciller) (1985)
- Sub-Mariner #25–36 (penciller) (1970–1971)
- Superior Spider-Man Team-Up #11–12 (inker) (2014)
- Super-Villain Team-Up #2 (penciller) (1975)
- Tarzan #19–29, Annual #2–3 (penciller) (1978–1979)
- Thor #193–194 (inker), 214 (penciller), 217 (inker), 239–240, 355, 368–369, 371–379, 381–382, Annual #6 (penciller) (1971–1987)
- Thor: The Worthy #1 (inker) (2020)
- Thunderstrike vol. 2 #1–5 (inker) (2011)
- Web of Spider-Man #7, 12, 34 (penciller); Annual #6 (inker) (1985–1990)
- Web of Spider-Man vol. 2 #1–7 (Spider-Girl) (inker) (2009–2010)
- Western Gunfighters #1 (inker) (1970)
- What If? #12 (Hulk), #44 (Captain America) (penciller) (1978, 1984)
- What If... General Ross Had Become the Hulk? oneshot (inker) (2004)
- Wild Thing #0 (inker) (1999)
- X-Factor #22 (penciller) (1987)
- X-Men #66 (penciller) (1970)

== See also ==
- Characters created by Sal Buscema

== Notes ==
Preceded by John Romita Sr.	Captain America artist 1972–1975	Succeeded by Frank Robbins
Preceded by n/a	The Defenders artist 1972–1976	Succeeded by Keith Giffen
Preceded by Jim Mooney	Marvel Team-Up artist 1975–1977	Succeeded by John Byrne
Preceded by Herb Trimpe	The Incredible Hulk artist 1975–1985	Succeeded by Mike Mignola
Preceded by John Buscema	Nova artist 1976–1977	Succeeded by Carmine Infantino
Preceded by n/a	Peter Parker, The Spectacular Spider-Man artist 1976–1978	Succeeded by Jim Mooney
Preceded by John Buscema	Captain America artist 1978–1979	Succeeded by Fred Kida
Preceded by n/a	Rom artist 1979–1984	Succeeded by Steve Ditko
Preceded by Walt Simonson	Thor artist 1986–1987	Succeeded by Ron Frenz
Preceded by Cynthia Martin	The Spectacular Spider-Man artist 1988–1996	Succeeded by Luke Ross
Preceded by Al Williamson	Spider-Girl inker 2003–2006	Succeeded by n/a
