= Civil War (comics) =

2006–2007 Marvel Comics crossover storyline

- Cover to Civil War #7 (January 2007) by Steve McNiven
- Publisher: Marvel Comics
- Publication date: July 2006 – February 2007
Title(s)
The Amazing Spider-Man (vol. 1) #529–538
Black Panther (vol. 4) #17-25
Blade (vol. 4) #5
Cable & Deadpool #30–32
Captain America (vol. 5) #22–25
Civil War #1–7
Civil War: Choosing Sides #1
Civil War: Battle Damage Report #1
Civil War: Files #1
Civil War: Front Line #1–11
Civil War: Opening Shot
Civil War: The Confession #1
Civil War: The Initiative #1
Civil War: War Crimes #1
Civil War: The Return #1
Civil War: X-Men #1–4
Civil War: Young Avengers/Runaways #1–4
Daredevil #87
Fallen Son: The Death of Captain America #1–5
Fantastic Four (vol. 4) #536–543
Ghost Rider (vol. 6) #8–11
Heroes for Hire (vol. 1) #1–3
Incredible Hulk #100
Iron Man (vol. 4) #13-14
Iron Man / Captain America: Casualties of War #1
Moon Knight (vol. 5) #7–12
Ms. Marvel (vol. 2) #6–8
New Avengers: Illuminati Special #1
New X-Men #28
Punisher War Journal (vol. 2) #1–3
New Avengers #21–25
The Sensational Spider-Man (vol. 2) #28–34
She-Hulk (vol. 2) #8-9
Thunderbolts (vol. 3) #103–105 110
Winter Soldier: Winter Kills #1
Wolverine #42–48
X-Factor (vol. 3) #8–9
- Main character(s): Iron Man; Captain America; Spider-Man; New Avengers; Fantastic Four; Marvel Universe

Creative team
- Writer: Mark Millar
- Penciller: Steve McNiven
- Inker: Dexter Vines
- Letterer: Chris Eliopoulos
- Colorist: Morry Hollowell
- Editor(s): Molly Lazer, Aubrey Sitterson, Andy Schmidt and Tom Brevoort
- Civil War: ISBN 0-7851-2179-X

"Civil War" is a 2006–07 Marvel Comics crossover event. The storyline consists of an eponymous seven-issue limited series, written by Mark Millar and penciled by Steve McNiven, and various tie-in books. The storyline builds upon previous Marvel storylines, particularly "Avengers Disassembled", "House of M", and "Decimation". The series' tagline is "Whose Side Are You On?".

Civil War explores the conflict between freedom and security against a backdrop of real-life events and discussions, such as the U.S. government's increased surveillance of its citizens in response to the 9/11 attacks. The plot revolves around the U.S. government passing a Superhero Registration Act to ostensibly have super-powered individuals act under official regulation, akin to law enforcement. Superheroes opposing the act, led by Captain America, find themselves in conflict with its supporters, led by Iron Man. Spider-Man is caught in the middle, while the X-Men remain neutral for mutantkind's survival. The superheroes supporting the law, including Mister Fantastic and Ms. Marvel, become increasingly authoritarian.

The series polarized critics and fans, but was a commercial success. A sequel, Civil War II, debuted in June 2016. The 2016 Marvel Cinematic Universe film Captain America: Civil War loosely adapted the storyline.

== Publication history ==
The Superhero Registration Act introduced in Civil War requires any United States resident with superhuman abilities to register with the federal government as a "human weapon of mass destruction". They must also reveal their true identity to authorities, and undergo training. Those who register may work for S.H.I.E.L.D., earning a salary and benefits, like other American civil servants.

Mark Millar, writer for the story, has said:

I opted instead for making the superhero dilemma something a little different. People thought they were dangerous, but they did not want a ban. What they wanted was superheroes paid by the federal government like cops and open to the same kind of scrutiny. It was the perfect solution and nobody, as far as I'm aware, has done this before.

=== Delays ===
Marvel announced in August 2006 that some issues of the main Civil War series would be pushed back several months to accommodate artist Steve McNiven. The schedule had issue #4 being released one month late, in September, while issue #5 was released two months later, in November. Furthermore, various tie-in books, including the Civil War: Front Line miniseries, were delayed to avoid spoiling plot developments.

In late November 2006, Marvel announced another delay. Civil War #6, originally scheduled for December 20, was pushed back two weeks and released on January 4. Unlike the previous instance, only The Punisher War Journal #2 was delayed. In a final act of rescheduling, Civil War #7 was pushed back two weeks (from January 17 to January 31), and then pushed back again until February 21.

=== Behind the scenes ===
After the publication of Civil War #7, Mark Millar described the book to Newsarama as "a story where a guy wrapped in the American flag is in chains as the people swap freedom for security". Millar conceded a "certain amount of political allegory" but said its real focus was on superheroes fighting each other. Contrasting it with The Ultimates, Millar said Civil War was "accidentally political because I just cannot help myself".

== Plot ==
The New Warriors (Night Thrasher, Namorita, Speedball, and Microbe) battle a group of villains (Cobalt Man, Speedfreek, Coldheart, and Nitro) in Stamford, Connecticut, while filming a reality television show. The villains are much more powerful than them, but Speedball believes that defeating them will boost the show's ratings. The fight results in Nitro exploding, killing more than 600 people (including school children and every villain, crew member, and New Warrior present, minus Speedball). Numerous other superheroes appear in Stamford to search for survivors, some admonishing the New Warriors for their reckless decision.

Public opinion turns against superhumans, branding even inactive members of the New Warriors as "baby killers". Hindsight, desperate to distance himself from the team, releases the New Warriors' secret identities online, and several of them are attacked. She-Hulk forces Hindsight to shut down the site, and Hindsight is arrested by John Jameson. Angry civilians attack the Human Torch outside a club after he cuts the line and mocks one of his critics.

Guided by Iron Man, Congress passes the Superhuman Registration Act (SHRA), 6 U.S.C. § 558, requiring the registration of all persons with superhuman abilities with the U.S. government, and the enlistment and training of all aspiring superheroes. The law applies to those with naturally occurring superhuman abilities, humans using exotic technology (e.g. Iron Man), or anyone who wants to challenge superhumans. Enactment of the federal law leads to revisions of state criminal codes.

Characters within the Marvel Universe superhero community split into two groups. One advocates registration as a responsible obligation, and the other opposes it, arguing the act violates civil liberties and the protection secret identities provide. While arguing with Iron Man about the law, African American hero Luke Cage compares the mandatory registration to slavery. A number of villains also choose a side.

Captain America refuses to join a S.H.I.E.L.D. strike force hunting violators of the act, and is attacked by S.H.I.E.L.D.'s "Cape-Killers" before the act is passed. He subsequently becomes a fugitive, and forms an underground resistance movement calling itself the "Secret Avengers". This team includes Hercules, Falcon, Danny Rand (who is acting as Daredevil in Matt Murdock's place), Luke Cage, and the Young Avengers. Iron Man, Reed Richards, Hank Pym (actually a Skrull in disguise), and She-Hulk come down in favor of the act. Spider-Man unmasks at a press conference as a show of support for the act. Doctor Strange wants no part of the act and tells Iron Man and Mister Fantastic to never call on him again (the government subsequently declares Doctor Strange exempt).

The government-backed heroes track down unregistered superhumans and subsequently detain or register them. Captain America's Secret Avengers and Iron Man's Avengers end up fighting in Yancy Street. The Thing, who was only visiting his old neighborhood, gets roped into crowd control. However, when a young member of the Yancy Street Gang is killed in the ensuing violence, he leaves the country for France.

The Secret Avengers, responding to a false emergency, are lured into an ambush by the pro-registration forces. As the battle turns against them, a new weapon is brought into play: Project Lightning, a cyborg clone of Thor. Confronted by Bill Foster, "Thor" sends a bolt of lightning through his chest, killing him. With both sides stunned, Cap orders a retreat. Susan Storm shelters the re-grouping Secret Avengers under an energy shield, allowing their escape.

Foster's death shakes up both sides: Stature and Nighthawk surrender and register, while the Human Torch and Invisible Woman oppose the act. In turn, Pym drafts a sub-group of the Thunderbolts to the SRA's cause.

Spider-Man demands to see the Prison 42 in the Negative Zone. He concludes he's made a mistake in siding with Stark, and attempts to defect. Iron Man confronts Peter, however, yet after a brief battle, Spider-Man escapes. Against Tony's will, Peter is hunted down and badly beaten by the Jester and Jack O'Lantern of the new Thunderbolts. The Punisher saves Spider-Man by killing the two villains, and carries him to a Secret Avengers safe-house. After recuperating, Spider-Man joins Cap's forces, and publicly pledges to fight the Registration Act.

The Punisher seeks to join Captain America's forces. He explains Iron Man's decision to employ infamous mass murderers motivated the gun-wielding vigilante to come out of hiding, but also notes superhero registration has caused a huge drop in crime. Captain America reluctantly accepts Punisher's help.

As the Punisher makes his way through the Baxter Building to retrieve plans for the Negative Zone prison, Sue Richards travels to Atlantis to persuade Namor to join the Secret Avengers, although he refuses. Supervillains Goldbug and Plunderer arrive at the Secret Avengers' base to join Captain America's team, but the Punisher immediately kills them, leading Captain America to attack him and kick him out of the group.

While meditating, Doctor Strange speaks with Uatu the Watcher, who asks why Strange does not end the conflict with his immense power. Doctor Strange responds that the Sorcerer Supreme has no business in mankind's internal struggles, but promises to pray for an outcome with minimal bloodshed that will benefit mankind.

As the final battle begins, Cloak teleports the combatants to New York City, where Namor and an Atlantean army arrive to fight alongside the Secret Avengers. The Champions, the Thor clone, and Captain Marvel, meanwhile, reinforce Stark's team. Mister Fantastic saves Invisible Woman from a bullet fired by Taskmaster, and Hercules destroys the Thor clone. The Thing returns to protect the civilians. As Captain America is about to deliver a final blow to Iron Man, policemen, EMTs, and firefighters try to restrain him. Realizing how much damage the fight has already inflicted upon the very people he wishes to protect, Captain America surrenders, and orders his team to stand down.

=== Aftermath ===
At the end of the storyline, a number of changes to the status quo have occurred, including:

- The President of the United States grants general amnesty to all Superhuman Registration Act opponents who turn themselves in or register.
- Captain America, the act's chief critic, is arrested and subsequently assassinated by a brainwashed Sharon Carter.
- Spider-Man's identity, Peter Parker, is now public knowledge, causing J. Jonah Jameson to sue.
- An assassin hired by Wilson Fisk, alias the Kingpin, to kill Spider-Man fails, instead shooting "secondary target" Aunt May and leaving her in critical condition. An enraged Spider-Man dons a cloth version of his black suit and confronts Kingpin in prison, mercilessly beating him within an inch of his life. Spider-Man warns the Kingpin that Fisk will die if May does, and promises the other inmates he will come for them if they try to harm Spider-Man or his family.
- Tony Stark is appointed director of S.H.I.E.L.D., while Maria Hill is demoted to deputy director.
- The 50-State Initiative is set up to eventually place a superhero team in every state.
- The Mighty Avengers assemble as a new team.
- Some heroes choose to leave the country, rather than submit, leading to the third Omega Flight's formation in Canada. Firestar, conversely, retires, while several heroes still in the U.S. remain underground, including the New Avengers: Luke Cage, Spider-Man, Spider-Woman (actually the Skrull queen Veranke), Iron Fist, Doctor Strange, Ronin (actually a resurrected Clint Barton), Echo, and Wolverine.
- Goliath, Typeface, and Stilt-Man are killed during the conflict. Tom Foster continues his uncle's legacy, becoming the new Goliath.
- Mister Fantastic and Invisible Woman are replaced by Black Panther and Storm while Reed and Sue work on their marriage.
- The Skrull Khn'nr begins impersonating the long-dead Captain Marvel.
- Speedball's powers and sanity are drastically altered, and he becomes the new Penance, joining the Thunderbolts.
- A reconstituted version of the New Warriors emerges, bearing little resemblance to the original. Most of the previous Warriors become part of The Initiative Program.
- Nitro is revealed to have survived the explosion and escapes, but is pursued and later dismembered by Wolverine. He is then captured by Penance, who forces him to experience the pain he inflicted on Stamford.
- Nova (Richard Rider) returns to Earth after defeating and killing Annihilus. Now bonded with the Worldmind, Rider learns his former New Warriors teammates are dead, and is asked to join the Initiative by Iron Man. After battling Norman Osborn's Thunderbolts, he instead chooses to leave Earth for Kree space.
- In Spider-Man: One More Day, Mephisto heals Aunt May and restores Spider-Man's secret identity in exchange for Peter Parker and Mary Jane Watson's marriage being erased from history.
- Thor, enraged at Tony Stark for creating Ragnarok, proposes him to keep the new Asgard floating over Oklahoma as a separate location from United States boundary, as long as not to declare war against one another.

== Characters ==
"†" indicates that the character died during the storyline.

"∆" indicates that the character originally upheld the act, but defected and became a Secret Avenger.

"°" indicates that the character was a Secret Avenger, but defected and registered.

"+" indicates that the character either retired or relocated to Canada.

"×" indicates that the character was neutral, but later became a Secret Avenger.

Registered heroes and villains

- Black Widow
- Doc Samson
- Iron Man
- Mister Fantastic
- Ms. Marvel
- Phone Ranger
- She-Hulk
- Tigra
- Ragnarok
- Wasp
- Yellowjacket
- Wonder Man
- Bishop
- Micromax
- Sabra
- Penance
- Great Lakes Champions
- Sentry
- Hellcat
- Thor Girl
- Two-Gun Kid
- Arana
- John Jameson
- Stature°
- Nighthawk°
- S.H.I.E.L.D.
  - Maria Hill
  - Dum Dum Dugan
  - Agent 13
  - Agent Whitman
  - Gabe Jones
  - Cape-Killers
- Deadpool
- Blade
- Heroes for Hire
  - Misty Knight
  - Colleen Wing
  - Humbug
  - Shang-Chi
  - Tarantula
  - Black Cat
  - Paladin
  - Orka
- Thunderbolts
  - Atlas
  - Helmut Zemo
  - MACH-IV
  - Moonstone
  - Fixer
  - Songbird
  - Blizzard
  - Radioactive Man
  - Living Laser
- Noh-Varr

Detained and recruited heroes and villains / Thunderbolts army

See list of Thunderbolts members.

Unregistered heroes and villains / Secret Avengers

- Arachne∆
- Cable
- Luke Cage
- Captain America+
- Colossus×
- Cyclops×
- Havok×
- Diamondback
- Black Panther×
- Storm×
- Cloak and Dagger
- Spider-Woman
- Daredevil
- Iron Fist
- Falcon
- Wolverine×
- Goliath†
- Nick Fury
- Hercules
- Night Nurse
- Young Avengers
  - Hulkling
  - Wiccan
  - Patriot
  - Hawkeye
  - Speed
  - Vision
- Ultra Girl
- Triathlon
- Living Lightning
- Invisible Woman∆
- Human Torch∆
- Silhouette
- Firebird
- Machine Man
- Spider-Man∆
- Justice
- Stingray

Detained heroes and villains

- Battlestar
- Coldblood
- Jack Flag
- Ghost Rider
- Gladiatrix
- Lightbright
- N'Kantu, the Living Mummy
- Network
- Prodigy
- Prowler
- Shroud
- Solo
- Typeface
- Digitek
- Lectronn
- Silverclaw

Unregistered heroes

- Debrii
- Firestar+
- Jessica Jones+
- Magneto
- Quicksilver
- Rage
- Runaways
- Slapstick
- Thunderclap
- Timeslip
- Sersi
- Moon Knight
- Howard the Duck
- Winter Soldier

Neutral parties

- Doctor Strange
- Thing
- X-Men×
- Namor×
- Nova (Richard Rider)
- Thor

== Other versions ==
=== Amazing Spider-Man: Renew Your Vows ===
When the Super-Human Registration Act was proposed, Professor X and the Avengers argued that mutantkind and superpowered communities should police themselves. Cyclops thought it was preposterous for Professor X to appoint himself the representative of mutantkind, and his opposition to Xavier's proposal led Jean Grey to break up with him and marry Wolverine.

=== Contest of Champions ===
The 2015 Contest of Champions series featured an alternate version of Civil War that had everything go in Tony Stark's favor. Five years after the war, Stark becomes the President of the United States and leads the Mighty Avengers as the Iron Patriot. His team consists of Penance (Robbie Baldwin), Iron Spider (Natasha Romanoff), Captain Marvel (Carol Danvers), and the Thor clone known as Thunderstrike. Steve Rogers (no longer called Captain America) and his teammates have been arrested and buy time off their sentence by performing suicide missions as the Thunderbolts. Steve's team consists of Spider-Man (Peter Parker), Invisible Woman, the Punisher, and Bill Foster (who survived the Civil War in this reality).

President Stark and his Mighty Avengers are taken to Battleworld by Maestro and have their memories altered to think that they are on Earth and that the Renegade Champions already there are unregistered vigilantes. The Thunderbolts are sent to rescue them, but misunderstandings result in the deaths of Penance and Thunderstrike and all three teams start fighting each other. Stark kills Steve and reveals that he is in the possession of the Reality Gem, which he used to prevent the deaths of Goliath and Captain America, win the war, and rig the presidential election. He attempts to use it again to undo his killing of Steve, but it does not work since they were in another dimension. Maestro kills Stark and the Punisher, but is stopped by the intervention of Stick, the Sentry, and Nigel Higgins using the Iso-Sphere. The remaining five heroes from the Mighty Avengers and Thunderbolts stay behind on Battleworld with the Sentry and fight villains attempting to gather the Iso-Sphere as the Civil Warriors.

=== Earth-3490 ===
When Mister Fantastic was researching realities where the Civil War ended differently, he found one reality in which their version of Anthony Stark was a woman named Natasha Stark. The Civil War was avoided entirely in this reality due to Stark's marriage to Steve Rogers, with the two deterring each other's more aggressive behaviour and allowing Reed Richards to complete the Super Hero Registration Program.

=== Spider-Man: Life Story ===
In a reality where all the characters age naturally after Peter Parker becomes Spider-Man in 1962, the Superhuman Registration Act was passed shortly after the September 11 attacks in 2001 and lasted for years. As a result, most of the heroes are middle-aged and older. In 2006, Ben Reilly (who was publicly known as Peter Parker/Spider-Man) is murdered by Morlun, prompting the real Peter Parker to return to New York to reveal he's alive to draw Morlun out to him and prevent Stark from taking control of Parker Industries. When Peter refuses Stark's offer to register, he is attacked by the U.S. Avengers (consisting of Tony Stark/Iron Man, James Rhodes/War Machine, Carol Danvers/Captain Marvel, Natasha Romanoff/Black Widow, Jennifer Walters/She-Hulk, and Danny Rand/Iron Fist all wearing power armors) before he is assisted by the Anti-Registration Avengers (consisting of Steve Rogers/Captain America, Clint Barton/Hawkeye, Luke Cage, Tyrone Johnson/Cloak and Tandy Bowen/Dagger). Peter dons a new Spider-Man armor and defeats the U.S. Avengers with a device that exposes a fail-safe Tony placed inside all of their armors. After Tony is revealed to be a hologram and disappears, Spider-Man joins the Anti-Registration Avengers to follow his daughter's advice on leaving the world a better place for future generations. A decade later, it is revealed that Doctor Doom took over the planet as the heroes were too busy fighting each other (a reference to the 2015 Secret Wars). Peter becomes the new leader of the resistance after all the other heroes died or disappeared from the public.

=== Spider-Verse ===
During an attempt by the reality-displaced Superior Spider-Man (Otto Octavius's mind in Peter Parker's body) to reach back to his dimension as seen in the Spider-Verse storyline, he discovered an alternate dimension where Spider-Man was killed by Karn during the Civil War, prompting him to continue investigating the murders of Spider-Men throughout the multiverse.

=== What If? ===
In What If Civil War Ended Differently?, a stranger appears in front of Iron Man, who is visiting Captain America's grave at Arlington National Cemetery. Tony Stark is told of two alternate ways the Civil War could have concluded:

- The first is detailed in, "What if Captain America led all the heroes against the Registration Act?" In this reality, Tony Stark dies of the Extremis virus, leaving the U.S. government to choose Steve Rogers as the spokesperson for heroes, who, as in the regular universe, opposes the Registration Act. Though he manages to delay its passing, the Stamford disaster occurs as in Earth-616. Without Tony to provide a fairer path for registration, the government's response is more extreme. Government forces led by Henry Peter Gyrich destroy the resistance and many heroes are slain.

Faced with this vision, Tony believes that this proves that he was right to pursue his pro-registration course of action, but the stranger then reveals another possibility;

- The second is detailed in, "What if Iron Man lost the Civil War?" In this reality, Iron Man asks for Cap's help during the confrontation at the power plant instead of threatening him, admitting his doubts about his actions rather than trying to justify them, and thus Cap does not use the hidden weapon in his glove to disable Tony's armor. The heroes then unite to defeat the out-of-control Thor clone, Ragnarok, which is released when a S.H.I.E.L.D. agent detects the weapon and assumes that Cap is still planning to use it. The resulting goodwill convinces Captain America to help run the program as he is the only one the heroes will trust with their secret identities.

The stranger is revealed to be Uatu, Earth 616's Watcher. Upon learning of the possibility of this alternate reality, Tony is devastated and weeps for the bright future he helped prevent.

In What If: Annihilation by David Hine and Mico Suayan, the cosmic Annihilation War reaches Earth during the War. The heroes unite to neutralize it, and many die in the first clashes. Captain America and Iron Man, after a final reconciliation, sacrifice themselves alongside Nova to deflect the full Annihilation Wave.

In "What If... Captain America Was Revived in 2099?", without Captain America around in the 2000s, the Civil War was instead headed by Thor and Iron Man, and the conflict over the Superhuman Registration Act ended the Heroic Age, giving way towards corporations taking over America.

== Civil War in Secret Wars (2015) ==
The "Civil War" storyline is featured in the 2015 storyline "Secret Wars", a crossover storyline, which revisits previous Marvel Comics storylines in the form of isolated geographic locations on a planet called Battleworld. The "Civil War" area is referred to as the Warzone.

== Civil War II (2016) ==
A direct sequel to the original series debuted in June 2016, written by Brian Michael Bendis and drawn by David Marquez. Unlike the previous story and the film, the conflict in this storyline is not about issues of government registration; instead, a new Inhuman, Ulysses, emerges with the ability to see predictions about the future. This results in conflict emerging between heroes led by Iron Man and Captain Marvel respectively, Stark favoring self-determination and concerned about the prospects of coming to depend on the visions while Danvers feels that his visions represent a potentially valuable asset.

== Reception ==
At the time of its release, Civil War received mixed reviews. Comic Book Round Up gave the series an average rating of 6.5. According to a scholarly analysis presented at the 2007 Comic-Con International, this story's conflict is a natural outgrowth of what psychologist Erich Fromm called "the basic human dilemma", the conflicting desires for both security and freedom, and "character motivations on both sides arise from positive human qualities because Fromm's image of human nature is ultimately optimistic, holding that people on either side are struggling to find what is best for all". Over time, Civil War has become more well received. IGN ranked it as one of the greatest comic book events.

== Tie-ins ==
(This list is in read order)

=== Road to Civil War ===
- Amazing Spider-Man #529
- Amazing Spider-Man #530
- Amazing Spider-Man #531
- New Avengers: Illuminati Special #1
- Fantastic Four #536
- Fantastic Four #537

=== Civil War ===
- Civil War: Opening Shot Sketchbook
- Civil War #1
- Wolverine #42
- Wolverine #43
- Wolverine #44
- Wolverine #45
- She-Hulk (2nd series) #8
- X-Factor #8
- New Avengers #21
- New Avengers #22
- Civil War: Front Line #1
- Civil War #2
- Amazing Spider-Man #532
- Amazing Spider-Man #533
- Thunderbolts #103
- Civil War: Front Line #2
- Fantastic Four #538
- Fantastic Four #539
- Amazing Spider-Man #534
- Civil War: Young Avengers & Runaways #1
- Civil War: Young Avengers & Runaways #2
- Civil War: Young Avengers & Runaways #3
- Civil War: Young Avengers & Runaways #4
- Civil War: Front Line #3
- Ms. Marvel #6
- Ms. Marvel #7
- Ms. Marvel #8
- Thunderbolts #104
- Thunderbolts #105
- Civil War: War Crimes
- Black Panther #18
- Black Panther #19
- Black Panther #20
- Black Panther #21
- Black Panther #22
- Civil War: X-Men #1
- Heroes for Hire #1
- Civil War #3
- Civil War #4
- Civil War: X-Men #2
- Civil War: X-Men #3
- Civil War: X-Men #4
- Black Panther #23
- Iron Man Vol. 4 #13
- Cable & Deadpool #30
- Cable & Deadpool #31
- Cable & Deadpool #32
- Civil War: Front Line #4
- X-Factor #9
- Civil War: Front Line #5
- Heroes for Hire #2
- Heroes for Hire #3
- New Avengers #23
- Iron Man / Captain America: Casualties of War
- Civil War Files
- Wolverine #46
- Wolverine #47
- Captain America (5th series) #22
- Captain America (5th series) #23
- Captain America (5th series) #24
- Civil War: Front Line #6
- Civil War: Front Line #7
- Daredevil #87
- Civil War: Choosing Sides
- New Avengers #24
- Fantastic Four #540
- Amazing Spider-Man #535
- Civil War #5
- Amazing Spider-Man #536
- Punisher: War Journal #1
- Punisher: War Journal #2
- Punisher: War Journal #3
- Iron Man #14
- New Avengers #25
- Black Panther #24
- Civil War: Front Line #8
- Fantastic Four #541
- Fantastic Four #542
- Amazing Spider-Man #537
- Winter Soldier: Winter Kills
- Blade #5
- Civil War #6
- Civil War: The Return
- Civil War #7
- Black Panther #25
- Amazing Spider-Man #538
- Civil War: The Confession
- Civil War: The Initiative
- Civil War: Battle Damage Report
- Civil War Poster Book
- Fallen Son: The Death of Captain America
- Ghost Rider #8-11
- Marvel Spotlight: Civil War Aftermath
- Marvel Spotlight: Captain America Remembered

=== Related but not listed ===
- The 2006 Eternals relaunch has the Civil War play a fairly present background in the setting with Sprite appearing in pro-registration PSAs. In issue #3, Iron Man reminds Sersi to register. In issue #6, Iron Man and Hank Pym try to get the Eternals to register again, but they refuse. In the end, Zuras explains that the Eternals have no desire to meddle with humanity, and will stay out of their affairs, which Iron Man concedes as a fair compromise.
- New X-Men #28 and She-Hulk #9 are indirectly, but strongly involved.
- Marvel Comics Presents (vol. 2) #12 involves a patsy attempt to get Man-Thing to register with the government. The story was published late (October 2008 cover date), during Secret Invasion and the same month as Marvel Zombies 3, in which Man-Thing also appeared.
- The cover of Nextwave: Agents of H.A.T.E. #11 features a Civil War parody cover including a plaid background, the words "Not part of a Marvel Comics event", and Aaron Stack holding up a card reading "Mark Millar licks goats".
- Spider-Man and Power Pack #3 (March 2007) includes a parody entitled "Civil Wards", written by Marc Sumerak and illustrated by Chris Giarrusso.
- The final issue of Robert Kirkman's Marvel Team-Up opens with Peter Parker getting ready to travel to Washington with Iron Man.
- The third issue of the 2006 Union Jack miniseries also mentions Tony Stark and Peter Parker's trip to Washington.
- Incredible Hulk #100 includes a 12-page backup story dealing with Mister Fantastic's involvement with the Thor clone, and the repercussions of the Illuminati having exiled the Hulk into space during Planet Hulk.
- In Annihilation #4, the former Earth hero Nova is aware of the Civil War and is disappointed with the actions the heroes have taken, as they are not united against the threat of Annihilus.
- In Friendly Neighborhood Spider-Man #6-13, Spider-Man is seen wearing the new suit he got in The Road to Civil War.
- Friendly Neighborhood Spider-Man #14-16
- New X-Men #29-31
- Thunderbolts #106-108
- In Sensational Spider-Man #26-27, Spider-Man is seen wearing the new suit he got in The Road to Civil War.
- In Sensational Spider-Man #28-34, Spider-Man deals with the aftermath of revealing his identity.
- Captain America (5th ed.) #25 is subtitled Civil War Epilogue.
- Fantastic Four #543 is subtitled Civil War Epilogue.
- Moon Knight (5th ed.) #8 and #9 are direct Civil War tie ins.
- Civil War: Front Lines #9-11 are direct Civil War tie-ins.

== Collected editions ==
=== Oversized Hardcovers ===
Title	Years covered	Material collected	Pages	Released	ISBN
Civil War	2006-2007	Civil War #1–7; Marvel Spotlight: Civil War; Daily Bugle Civil War Newspaper Special; Civil War Script Book	512	12 Nov 2008	Steve McNiven cover: 978-0785121787
Civil War	2006-2007	Civil War #1–7; Marvel Spotlight: Civil War; Daily Bugle Civil War Newspaper Special; Civil War Script Book	512	12 Nov 2008	Michael Turner DM cover: 978-0785121787
Civil War	2006-2007	Civil War #1–7; Marvel Spotlight: Civil War; Daily Bugle Civil War Newspaper Special; Civil War Script Book	512	6 Apr 2016	Steve McNiven cover: 978-0785194484
Civil War	2006-2007	Civil War #1–7; Marvel Spotlight: Civil War; Daily Bugle Civil War Newspaper Special; Civil War Script Book	512	6 Apr 2016	Movie DM cover: 978-1302900199
Civil War: Avengers	2006-2007	New Avengers: Illuminati; New Avengers #21–25; Ms. Marvel #6–8; Iron Man/Captain America: Casualties of War; Iron Man #13–14; Winter Soldier: Winter Kills; Captain America #22–25; Civil War: The Confession; Civil War: The Initiative; Civil War Fallen Son Daily Bugle Special	552	12 Sep 2010	Adi Granov cover: 978-0785148807
Civil War: Fantastic Four	2006-2007	Fantastic Four #536–543; Black Panther #18–25; She-Hulk #8; Civil War: Young Avengers/Runaways #1–4	536	6 Oct 2010	Adi Granov cover: 978-0785148814
Civil War: Frontline	2006-2007	Civil War: Frontline #1–11; Civil War: Choosing Sides; Civil War: The Return	440	27 Oct 2010	John Watson cover: 978-0785149491
Civil War: Spider-Man	2006-2007	Amazing Spider-Man #529–538; Sensational Spider-Man #28–34; Friendly Neighborhood Spider-Man #11–16	544	1 Dec 2010	Ron Garney cover: 978-0785148821
Civil War: Underside	2006-2007	Thunderbolts #103–105; Moon Knight #7–12; Heroes For Hire #1–3; Civil War: War Crimes; Punisher War Journal #1–3; Ghost Rider #8–11	512	29 Dec 2010	David Finch cover: 978-0785148838
Civil War: X-Men	2006-2007	Wolverine #42–48; X-Factor #8–9; Cable & Deadpool #30–32; Civil War: X-Men #1–4; Blade #5; Civil War Files; Civil War: Battle Damage Report	520	2 Feb 2011	Humberto Ramos cover: 978-0785148845

=== Premiere Hardcovers ===
In 2016, to promote the release of the Captain America: Civil War movie, Marvel produced an 11-volume boxset, featuring: Civil War Prologue (304 pages), Civil War (256), Civil War: Avengers (392), Civil War: Fantastic Four (360), Civil War: Frontline (360), Civil War: Marvel Universe (408), Civil War: Spider-Man (472), Civil War: The Underside (352), Civil War: X-Men (408), Civil War: Aftermath (344), Civil War: Files (464), and a folded poster. The ISBN is 978-0785196945.

=== Trade paperbacks ===
Title	Material Collected	Pages	Released	ISBN
The Road to Civil War	New Avengers: Illuminati Amazing Spider-Man #529-531 Fantastic Four #536 & 537	160	February 21, 2007	978-0-7851-1974-6
Civil War	Civil War (2006) #1-7	208	April 11, 2007	978-0-7851-2179-4
Civil War: Front Line - Volume 1	Civil War: Front Line #1-6	208	May 2, 2007	978-0-7851-2312-5
Civil War: Front Line - Volume 2	Civil War: Front Line #7-11	160	May 23, 2007	978-0-7851-2469-6
Civil War: Front Line	Civil War: Front Line #1-11	360	April 7, 2016	978-0-7851-9565-8
Captain America: Civil War	Captain America #22-24 Winter Soldier: Winter Kills one-shot	112	January 1, 2007	978-0-7851-2798-7
Iron Man: Civil War	Iron Man #13-#14 Iron Man/Captain America: Casualties of War Civil War: The Confession	160	January 1, 2007	978-0-7851-2314-9
Civil War: Captain America/Iron Man	Captain America #22-24 Winter Soldier: Winter Kills one-shot Iron Man #13-#14 Iron Man/Captain America: Casualties of War Civil War: The Confession	224	March 31, 2016	978-0-7851-9563-4
The Amazing Spider-Man: Civil War	Amazing Spider-Man #532-538	168	May 2, 2007	978-0-7851-2237-1
Civil War: Peter Parker, Sensational Spider-Man	Sensational Spider-Man #28-34	168	January 1, 2007	978-0-7851-2189-3
Fantastic Four: Civil War	Fantastic Four #538-543	184	January 1, 2007	978-0-7851-2227-2
Civil War: Heroes For Hire	Heroes for Hire #1-5	120	January 1, 2007	978-0-7851-2362-0
Civil War: Thunderbolts	Thunderbolts #101-105	120	January 1, 2007	978-0-7851-1947-0
Civil War: Heroes for Hire/Thunderbolts	Heroes For Hire #1-5 Thunderbolts #101-105	240	January 1, 2016	978-0-7851-9566-5
Civil War: X-Men	Civil War: X-Men #1-4	112	May 9, 2007	978-0-7851-2313-2
Civil War: X-Men Universe	Cable & Deadpool #30-32 X-Factor #8-9	120	January 1, 2007	978-0-7851-2243-2
Civil War: X-Men	Civil War: X-Men #1-4 Cable & Deadpool #30-32 X-Factor #8-9	224	January 1, 2016	978-0-7851-9571-9
Civil War: Young Avengers & Runaways	Civil War: Young Avengers & Runaways #1-4	112	January 1, 2007	978-0-7851-2317-0
Black Panther: Civil War	Black Panther #19-25	168	January 1, 2007	978-0-7851-2235-7
Ms. Marvel, Vol 2: Civil War	Miss Marvel #6-10 & Special #1	136	January 1, 2007	978-0-7851-2305-7
New Avengers, Vol 5: Civil War	New Avengers #21-25	120	January 1, 2007	978-0-7851-2446-7
Punisher War Journal: Civil War	Punisher War Journal #1-4 Punisher War Journal #1 in B&W	144	September 5, 2007	978-0-7851-2315-6
Wolverine: Civil War	Collects Wolverine #42-48	168	January 1, 2007	978-0-7851-1980-7
Civil War: War Crimes	Civil War: War Crimes and Underworld #1-5	160	May 30, 2007	978-0-7851-2652-2
Civil War: Companion	Civil War Files Civil War: Battle Damage Report Marvel Spotlight: Mark Miller/Steve McNiven Marvel Spotlight: Civil War Aftermath Daily Bugle: Civil War Special Edition	216	June 13, 2007	978-0-7851-2576-1
Civil War: Marvel Universe	Civil War: The Initiative Civil War: Choosing Sides Civil War: The Return She-Hulk #8 What If?: Civil War	184	January 1, 2016	978-0-7851-9567-2
What If? Civil War	What If? Annihilation What If? Civil War What If? Planet Hulk What If? X-Men What If? Spider-Man vs. Wolverine	120	January 1, 2008	978-0-7851-3036-9

== In other media ==
=== Novels ===
Marvel adapted Civil War into a prose hardcover novel in July 2012 as the first of a series of four novels adapting some of Marvel's most significant fictional events. It was written by Stuart Moore, the writer of Namor: The First Mutant. The book expanded on the story and set the events during Barack Obama's first term in office, rather than George W. Bush's last term; Tony Stark makes reference to the Affordable Care Act when speaking to Spider-Man in the first chapter of the novel. The novel is set in the alternate timeline created by the controversial storyline "One More Day" and detailed in "One Moment in Time", as Spider-Man is depicted as never having married Mary Jane Watson, having never arrived on the day of their wedding. In the original comics version, Civil War was a lead-in to "One More Day", depicting May Parker's assassination on the orders of Wilson Fisk near the end of the main Civil War storyline. An illustrated version of the novel was released in 2016, with a cover from Steve Epting, and internal art from Steve McNiven. The ISBN is 978-0785195863.

=== Film ===
The 2016 film Captain America: Civil War was a cinematic treatment of the story, albeit focusing more on the issue of government control rather than public knowledge of secret identities: these matters were also being escalated by the interference and manipulation of Helmut Zemo as his plan for revenge against the Avengers' role in Ultron's assault and the deaths of Zemo's family. The movie version of Civil War also differs from the comic substantially; the United Nations enforces the above regulations, called the Sokovia Accords, rather than America alone, former Army General Thaddeus Ross as the United States Secretary of State is involved in the registration debacle instead of S.H.I.E.L.D. and Maria Hill as the former was dismantled in Captain America: The Winter Soldier and the latter's whereabouts are unknown at that point or is presumably in hiding with Nick Fury, and the fate of Bucky Barnes is a key element of the war after he is framed for the assassination of the Black Panther's father, the king of Wakanda. As in the comics, Captain America and Iron Man are the respective leaders of the anti-registration and pro-registration sides of the conflicts, with Cap's side including the Falcon, Bucky, Ant-Man, Hawkeye, and the Scarlet Witch, and Iron Man's side being Black Widow, War Machine, the Black Panther, Spider-Man, and the Vision. Stark and Rogers reconcile after realizing the truth of the king's assassination, but it is short-lived as Zemo reveals Barnes' role in Stark's parents' deaths, and that Rogers kept the truth from him. An enraged Stark attacks both Rogers and Barnes, and the fight culminates with Rogers abandoning his shield and identity and escaping with Barnes, becoming a fugitive in the process. The film concludes with Cap's side seeking asylum in Wakanda after the Black Panther recognizes that he was wrong to target Bucky. The latter is then put into cryogenic sleep. Black Widow goes on the run after betraying Stark's side to help Rogers find the instigator of their fight, and War Machine is left crippled after injuries sustained in the final battle.

Later in the 2018 film Avengers: Infinity War it was revealed that Hawkeye and Ant-Man made deals with Ross to be placed on house arrest, so they could be with their families. The impact of the Civil War is also heavily felt throughout the film as the Avengers' disunity and Rogers and Stark still being on bad terms, left them vulnerable to Thanos' invasion and the Blip.

=== Television ===
A different variation of the Civil War storyline closely resembling Civil War II as it features Iron Man and Captain Marvel in opposition to each other was adapted in the four-part season finale of Avengers: Ultron Revolution. In this version of the storyline, the Registration Act targets new Inhumans, and teams of Avengers come into conflict over the issue, as in other adaptations. It is revealed in Part 3, however, that the Inhuman Registration Act is actually part of a plan by Ultron (disguised as Truman Marsh) to begin the Ultron Revolution by manipulating humans and Inhumans into destroying each other, which is foiled by the combined efforts of the Avengers.

=== Video games ===
- The comic is adapted into Marvel: Ultimate Alliance 2. While the storyline remains relatively faithful to the original comic, it takes a different path halfway through the game, as the act is briefly suspended for the heroes to deal with a crisis involving the nanite network used to control supervillains manifesting a form of sentience. In the game, the player gets to choose whether to side with Pro or Anti-Registration- with Captain America, Luke Cage and Iron Fist 'locked' into Anti-Registration and Iron Man, Mister Fantastic and Songbird in Pro-Registration: which affects the story's progression, characters they interact with, and the story's ending. Spider-Man and Wolverine are however playable on both sides.
- In Marvel vs. Capcom 3: Fate of Two Worlds, Iron Man and Captain America reference the event if they are pitted against each other. The player also receives an achievement titled "Whose Side are You On?" if Iron Man defeats Captain America or vice versa in an online match.
- In Marvel: Contest of Champions, a special storyline featured elements of the Civil War, as the apparent death of the Collector causes Iron Man and Captain America to become divided over what action they should take with the Iso-Spheres that must be collected in the game. This storyline also introduces a special player in the form of the Civil Warrior, who is identified as a version of Steve Rogers who witnessed so much death in the final battle of the Civil War that he adopted some of Tony Stark's armor and dedicated himself to preventing such a catastrophe ever again.
