= Typeface (disambiguation) =

A typeface is a set of characters that share common design features.

Typeface may also refer to:

- Typeface (character), a Marvel Comics character
- Typeface (film), a 2009 American documentary film
