= Civil War: X-Men =

Four-issue comic book mini-series

Civil War X-Men
- Cover of the 1st issue

Publication information
- Publisher: Marvel Comics
- Format: Limited series
- Publication date: 2006
- No. of issues: 4
- Main character(s): Archangel; Beast; Bishop; Cyclops; Iceman

Creative team
- Written by: David Hine
- Penciller: Yanick Paquette
- Inker: Serge LaPointe
- Colorist: Stephane Peru

Civil War: X-Men is a four-issue comic book mini-series, published in 2006 by Marvel Comics. The series was written by David Hine, Fabian Nicieza, Peter David, and Dennis Calero. The illustration of the mini-series was done by Staz Johnson and Dennis Calero. Though published as part of the wider Civil War event, its plot is a continuation of the earlier X-Men: The 198 mini-series.

== Plot ==
Prior to the publication of Civil War: X-Men, the events of House of M reduced the mutant population to only 198 known mutants. Subsequently, the US government turned the Xavier Institute into a relocation camp patrolled by Sentinel Squad O*N*E*. The X-Men later declared official neutrality in the superhero civil war.

X-Force members Domino, Shatterstar, and Caliban free the mutants staying at the Xavier Institute. Cyclops declines to assist the Office of National Emergency (O*N*E), but Bishop wants mutants to police their own. The U.S. government gives Bishop permission to take Sabra and Micromax to find the escapees. The X-Men decide to sneak off the grounds to find the escapees before Bishop can arrest them.

General Lazer, head of the O*N*E, discovers Johnny Dee's power to control anyone whose DNA he can digest. Cyclops contacts Captain America, who reveals the Nevada bunker Domino has taken the escaped mutants to. Bishop learns that the President of the United States is considering full amnesty for the 198. As Cyclops' team is about to enter the bunker, Bishop and several Sentinels arrive and tell everyone to await the President's decision. Valerie Cooper stumbles onto Lazer and Dee's machinations, becomes head of the O*N*E, and calls a ceasefire. However, Lazer has already initiated a self-destruct sequence in the bunker the 198 are in.

The X-Men work with Bishop, Iron Man, and Ms. Marvel to save the 198 from the bunker. Johnny Dee kills Lazer before being imprisoned is locked away in prison. The 198 walk away intact and separate, while Bishop leaves the X-Men. He is later seen talking to Cooper, who tells him the O*N*E were given too much discretionary power at the expense of mutant civil rights and that the President has appointed an oversight committee to make changes. The first being that the Xavier Institute becomes a community for mutants, with residency being voluntary, and that the O*N*E would no longer be authorized to restrict their comings and goings. The second change is that the Sentinels would remain on the grounds, but for protection only. Cooper offers Bishop a job with the O*N*E, which he accepts.

== Collected editions ==
=== Trade paperbacks ===
Title	ISBN	Collects
Civil War: X-Men	ISBN 978-0-7851-9571-9	Civil War: X-Men (2006) #1–4, Cable & Deadpool #30–32, and X-Factor (2006) #8–9
