= Carmine Di Giandomenico =

Italian comics artist (born 1973)

Carmine Di Giandomenico (born 1973 in Teramo, Italy) is an Italian comics artist. In 1995 he drew the limited series Examen for publishers Phoenix. Then he drew an issue of Conan the Barbarian (1997) for Marvel Italia, written by Chuck Dixon.

In 1999, he headed in a new artistic direction with writer Alessandro Bilotta, and produced the limited series Le strabilianti vicende di Giulio Maraviglia-inventore, which won the Fumo di China prize. Still with Bilotta's storylines, he pursued in 2002 an experimental course with La Dottrina. He followed this with his first work as sole author Oudeis in 2004.

In 2005, Marvel published his limited series Vegas, and a What If... featuring Captain America. He followed that with work on the plot, script, and pencils of Daredevil: Battlin' Jack Murdock, co-wrote with Zeb Wells. His most well-known Marvel project is Spider-Man: Noir with author David Hine. He is also initially illustrating The Flash for DC.

Di Giandomenico has also created the story-boards for numerous films, for Martin Scorsese and Tsui Hark. He was the main artist for the 2012 series Punisher: War Zone.
