= Civil War: Front Line =

Comic book event

- Cover of the 1st issue

Publication information
- Publisher: Marvel Comics
- Format: Limited series
- Genre: Superhero
- Publication date: August 2006-2007
- No. of issues: 11

Civil War: Front Line is an 11-issue, limited series tie-in to Marvel Comics's Civil War event which started in August 2006.

Part of the story is told from the perspective of two reporters embedded in the opposite camps of the war. Ben Urich follows the stories on Iron Man's side with the pro-registration heroes, while Sally Floyd investigates the anti-registration faction headed by Captain America. Writer Paul Jenkins was given carte blanche to have the stories reflect the current political landscape in the United States.

The other half of the series is told from the perspective of Speedball of the New Warriors. It shows Speedball's struggles with survivor guilt, imprisonment, and relations to the victims of the Stamford disaster.

Each issue from #1 to #9 concludes with a short story comparing the events of Civil War to real historical conflicts. Each piece is accompanied by portions of a relevant text.

== Plot summary ==
Iron Man shows his support for the Superhuman Registration Act by agreeing to be interviewed by Ben Urich, while making the proposal for Sally Floyd to investigate the anti-registration faction, right after she has an awkward interview with Spider-Man. Afterwards, Peter Parker reveals his identity as Spider-Man on a press conference.

Floyd meets a group of unregistered heroes at a warehouse. They all wonder at the reasons for being persecuted. Later, Thunderclap is battling Bantam, the latter being pro-registration and determined to bring Thunderclap in. Bantam is knocked into a gas tank and killed in the following explosion. She-Hulk tries to help Robbie Baldwin aka Speedball negotiate a deal to get him out of jail. Baldwin does not want to formally admit fault in any way. Meanwhile, a pet store owner is revealed to be a member of an Atlantean sleeper cell.

Floyd meets the unregistered heroes again, but their meeting is cut short when Iron Man and his troops storm in to apprehend the heroes. Floyd manages to get away before being seen. Meanwhile, Urich is following a lead which turns out to be trap set by Norman Osborn, who threatens him. Baldwin is attacked in prison, which causes his dormant powers to reactivate. He is then visited by his mother, who cuts all ties with him.

Urich intends to quit his job at the Daily Bugle after his encounter with Osborn is doubted. He agrees to do one last assignment, accompanying the pro-reg heroes to a fight against Captain America's anti-registration group. Urich is shocked when Ragnarok kills Goliath, and is further disturbed by the use of super villains in the conflict. Baldwin agrees to speak at a public hearing, but is shot by a man in the crowd. The Atlantean sleeper agent meets up with several armed comrades, but does not noticed he is trailed by Wonder Man.

As Baldwin is taken away in an ambulance, his powers spontaneously manifest again as he goes into shock, blowing the ambulance's engine and causing it to crash. The police finds the Atlantean sleeper agents, all dead, along with an unconscious Wonder Man. After waking, he claims that Osborn is responsible.

Urich's technology expert friend Dan believes that Tony Stark may be manipulating the events of the Civil War to make money. Floyd is covertly escorted to the meeting place of Captain America's forces. A later peace conference with Atlanteans goes badly when Osborn attacks the visitors. He claims he was under control of an outside force.

Floyd meets up with Captain America to interview him and declares that he is misguided in his view of the Civil War. Urich and Peter Parker hack into the computers of Tony Stark's accounting firm to discover that Stark has used inside information to manipulate the stock market for personal gain. Reed Richards confirms that the nanites in Osborn's blood that were supposed to keep him in check were altered. Richards concludes that there is a traitor and Stark admits that there is and he has known it all along. Baldwin is used as a hostage during a prison break, but the plan fails when he regains his powers. Norman Osborn is interrogated by two homicide detectives but before they can get anything out of him, a shadowy figure arrives with a document that makes Osborn's case a matter of National Security.

Ben Urich resigns from the Daily Bugle because he knows they will not print what he has discovered. Meanwhile, Baldwin meets with a costume maker, who says he can see it used for no means less than torture. Baldwin reveals it is for himself and assumes the new identity of Penance.

During the final battle of the pro- and anti-registration forces, several people are killed. Some days later, Floyd and Urich decide to form a news outlet called 'Frontlines'. They meet with Iron Man, who they believe orchestrated much of the preceding events for the purposes of registration, because he believed the alternative would be far worse. Angered, Iron Man kicks them out of his office.

== Collected editions ==
Title	Material collected	Published date	ISBN
Civil War: Front Line Vol. 1	Civil War: Front Line #1-6	April 2007	978-0785123125
Civil War: Front Line Vol. 2	Civil War: Front Line #7-11	May 2007	978-0785124696
Civil War: Front Line (HC)	Civil War: Front Line #1-11, Civil War: Choosing Sides, Civil War: The Return	January 2011	978-0785149491
Civil War: Front Line (TPB)	Civil War: Front Line #1-11	April 2016	978-0785195658
