= Spider-Man Noir =

Marvel Comics superhero

Peter Parker; Spider-Man Noir
- Cover of Spider-Man: Noir #1 (February 2009) by Patrick Zircher

Publication information
- Publisher: Marvel Comics
- First appearance: Spider-Man: Noir #1 (February 2009)
- Created by: David Hine (co-writer); Fabrice Sapolsky (co-writer); Carmine Di Giandomenico (artist); Marko Djurdjević (costume design); – Based on Spider-Man, created by Stan Lee and Steve Ditko

In-story information
- Alter ego: Peter Benjamin Parker
- Species: Human mutate
- Place of origin: Earth-90214 (also called "Earth-Noir")
- Team affiliations: Web Warriors
- Abilities: Proportionate strength, speed and agility of a spider; organic webbing generation; skilled marksman and expert hand-to-hand combatant.

Spider-Man Noir (Peter Parker), often referred to as Spider-Noir, Spider-Man, or simply Noir, is a superhero appearing in American comic books published by Marvel Comics. Created by David Hine and Fabrice Sapolsky as part of the Marvel Noir universe (Earth-90214), this alternate version of Spider-Man is a reinterpretation of the character inspired by film noir who emerges in New York during the Great Depression.

While investigating a smuggling ring, Peter Parker is bitten by what seems to be a highly venomous spider housed inside a spider-god idol. Falling unconscious, Parker has a vision of the spider-god promising him power. He then awakes inside a cocoon and emerges from it, now possessing super-human abilities similar to a spider. As the feared vigilante "the Spider-Man," Parker wages a one-man war against the criminal underworld in New York City, partly to avenge the death of his uncle Ben Parker, killed at the hands of the cannibal Adrian Toomes, and his mentor Ben Urich, at the hands of the city's major crime lord, Norman Osborn. After Osborn's defeat, Spider-Man Noir continues his vigilante life for years and opposes the forces of Nazi Germany even before the United States enters World War II. In contrast to the Peter Parker of the mainstream Marvel continuity, Spider-Man Noir initially uses brutal and lethal force against his enemies and later struggles with the moral implications of this. In the 2025–2026 miniseries Spider-Man Noir – The Gwen Stacy Affair, a second Spider-Man Noir is introduced, stealing the powers of the original.

Since his conception, Spider-Man Noir has appeared in numerous media adaptations. The character's first appearance in other media was in the 2010 video game Spider-Man: Shattered Dimensions, where he was voiced by Christopher Daniel Barnes. In the 2012 animated series Ultimate Spider-Man, he was voiced by Milo Ventimiglia. Nicolas Cage voices the character in the animated film Spider-Man: Into the Spider-Verse (2018) and the upcoming Spider-Man: Beyond the Spider-Verse (2027), and portrays him in the live-action series Spider-Noir (2026). Cage's portrayal influenced later comic book characterizations of Spider-Man Noir.

== Publication history ==
=== Creation ===
In 2009, Marvel Comics created a line of Marvel Noir comics. Taking place in an alternate universe, these stories reinterpreted familiar Marvel Characters to better reflect a hardboiled-crime noir atmosphere, with most of the adventures taking place in the United States during the Great Depression era. The Marvel Noir version of Peter Parker was created by writers David Hine and Fabrice Sapolsky, and artists Carmine Di Giandomenico (who drew his first stories) and Marko Djurdjević (who designed his costume). Though he was not called "Spider-Man Noir" in the stories themselves, Marvel creators and comic fans use this nickname to distinguish him from the mainstream version of Spider-Man. The character has similarities to the Spider, a character from pulp-magazines that Stan Lee has cited as an inspiration for the original Spider-Man. In the television adaptation, the character takes on the name "the Spider".

=== 2000s ===
The Marvel Noir version of Peter Parker first appeared in Spider-Man: Noir #1 in February 2009, the first issue of a four-part miniseries. The character became popular enough to quickly earn a sequel mini-series later that same year, entitled Spider-Man Noir – Eyes Without a Face and produced by the same creative team, David Hine with Fabrice Sapolsky. This version of Spider-Man Noir was the first to add a fedora hat to his costume. The series address various political topics, such as socialist agitation during the Depression, American fascism, lynchings and racism in the New Deal period, as well as motifs from film noir such as the femme fatale. The villains of the story discuss the theories of Rudolf Kjellen, particularly biopolitics. The second miniseries alludes to Eyes Without a Face, a French horror film of 1960. The art style of the series is similar to Frank Miller's Elektra Lives Again.

=== 2010s and 2020s ===
The character went on to appear in the 2014 story event Spider-Verse, written by Dan Slott. After this, the hero featured in several multiverse crossover comics such as Secret Wars, the second Spider-Verse series, and Web Warriors. In 2018, Spider-Man Noir was seemingly killed in the Spider-Geddon storyline. After the adaptation of the character in December of that year in the theatrical movie Spider-Man: Into the Spider-Verse, Spider-Man Noir was resurrected in Spider-Verse vol. 3 #5 in 2020; his appearance, personality, and dialogue became more similar to his movie counterpart. An ongoing Spider-Man Noir monthly comic book series, subtitled Twilight in Babylon, began months later the same year, written by Margaret Stohl and with interior art by Juan Ferreyra.

Another ongoing Spider-Man Noir monthly comic book series, subtitled The Gwen Stacy Affair, was published from 2025 to 2026, written by Erik Larsen and with interior art by Andrea Broccardo.

== Character biography ==
=== Spider-Man Noir Volume 1 ===
On Earth-90214 in the winter of 1932, during the Great Depression, New York City is plagued by many criminal gangs. Daily Bugle photojournalist Ben Urich, known to some criminals as "the Spider," attends a public oration on the struggle of the common citizen by May Parker in Central Park and befriends her nephew Peter Parker. Unable to attend university due to lack of money, Peter shares that his Uncle Ben, a socialist activist who fought in World War I as a pilot, was recently murdered by criminals working for Norman Osborn, an industrialist believed to be the crime lord called Goblin. Peter recalls his Uncle Ben's words regarding the futility and unjust nature of World War I: "If those in power can't be trusted, it's the responsibility of the people to remove them." Peter works for Urich and in December 1932, he ventures to a warehouse of stolen antiques. One artifact — a spider idol — breaks open and releases a horde of spiders. One bites Peter, causing him to pass out and dream of a spider-god who claims it will give Peter power. The young man awakes in a black web cocoon and frees himself, discovering he now has spider-like powers.

Donning a mask, Peter confronts Norman Osborn and is shocked to discover Urich present. The photojournalist has been blackmailing Osborn with his information on the mob boss's activities in exchange for the Goblin fueling his drug habit. Inspired by Peter's determination to fight the Goblin no matter what, Urich decides to expose Osborn's crimes but is murdered. Meanwhile, Peter creates a costume using elements of his uncle's World War I-era airman uniform, becoming "the Spider-Man." Urich's former lover Felicia Hardy, owner of the Black Cat club, aids Peter's war on Osborn's criminal syndicate.

In January 1933, the Spider-Man kills Vulture to save May Parker, but she criticizes him for killing the Vulture instead of capturing him. After Osborn's gang is largely defeated, Spider-Man has the opportunity to kill the Goblin but decides true justice means the man must stand trial and the truth become public record. Kraven the Hunter, one of Osborn's other cronies who is dying, then attacks the Goblin, killing him. In the spring, Franklin D. Roosevelt becomes president, Adolf Hitler rises in power in Europe, May Parker continues being an activist for the common people, and Spider-Man Noir continues fighting crime and corruption.

=== Eyes Without a Face ===
Spider-Man Noir – Eyes Without a Face takes place roughly eight months after Spider-Man Noir. In September 1933, Peter continues to operate as a photojournalist and helps at May Parker's soup kitchen along with his friend Mary Jane Watson. Meanwhile, the masked Crime Master rises as the city's new crime boss. Peter develops a relationship with Felicia Hardy, but she insists she is not his girlfriend. Peter and his friend Joseph "Robbie" Robertson, a struggling reporter, investigate the Ellis Island lab of Otto Octavius and his assistant Curt Connors, who are conducting experiments in mind control for the US government. That night, Flint "Sandman" Marko delivers several people to Octavius's lab. Secretly working with the Friends of New Germany, Octavius intends to prove that "inferior" people can be controlled with brain surgery. Spider-Man tracks the Crime Master and is almost beaten to death by Marko, who is shot dead by police while the Crime Master escapes. Discovering she is connected to Spider-Man, the Crime Master attacks and disfigures Felicia Hardy, nearly killing her. Learning that Crime Master is delivering people of color to Octavius, Spider-Man goes to the lab on Ellis Island and finds Robbie, only to find the man has already undergone surgery on the frontal lobe, leaving him without memory or free will.

Octavius and Crime Master come to blows and the latter is killed. FBI agent Jean de Wolfe arrives and Octavius is arrested. Spider-Man is told Felicia, still recovering from serious injuries and her face now scarred, does not want to see him again. A month later, the government decides to deport Octavius rather than put him on trial publicly and risk he will reveal state secrets. The scientist arrives in Germany only to be humiliated when he realizes the Nazis and Heinrich Himmler believe his congenital disability makes him inferior and his work useless. As time passes, Felicia recovers from her injuries, but wears a mask to cover her scars.

=== Spider-Verse ===
The Spider-Verse storyline featured Spider heroes from various alternate realities being hunted by the vampiric Inheritors. The comic tie-in Edge of Spider-Verse #1 returns to Earth-90214 where it is now August, 1939. Peter has been operating as the Spider-Man for six years and finally attended university classes, while his girlfriend Mary Jane spent three years in Spain fighting with the Abraham Lincoln International Brigade. Wilson Fisk is a rising power in crime and sends illusionist Mysterio to kill the Spider-Man. Peter is then recruited by Superior Spider-Man to join a group of Spiders fighting against the Inheritors. Following an adventure in the Secret Wars crossover, Spider-Man Noir joins a team of six Spiders called the Web Warriors that regularly meets to combats threats to other dimensions, particularly those that no longer have a Spider hero of their own.

The inter-dimensional Web of Life and Destiny becomes unstable due to the technology the Web Warriors use to travel between worlds. This causes some realities to bleed into each other and Spider-Man Noir's world to suffer time anomalies. Eventually, the team rights it and new teammate Octavia Otto helps create a better method of traveling between worlds that will not destabilize the Web.

=== Spider-Geddon and Death ===
One night in 1940, Spider-Man Noir investigates a weapons sale between Herman Schultz and the Nazis. He fights alongside Felicia Hardy, now on speaking terms with him and operating as the masked vigilante White Widow. Spider-UK arrives and requests Spider-Man Noir on an important mission. The Web Warriors try to stop the Inheritors from using cloning technology to resurrect, but are too late. Spider-Man Noir attempts to kill the Inheritor called Morlun with a grenade, sacrificing himself in the process. The Inheritor survives and drains Spider-Man Noir's remaining life-force, killing him.

Later, Spider-Gwen travels to the Marvel Noir Earth to inform May Parker, Mary Jane, and Felicia Hardy how their version of Peter heroically died. Grieving, May is furious to find out her nephew was a vigilante, "a broken man," but Mary Jane and Felicia thank Gwen for giving them closure.

=== Resurrection ===
In Spider-Verse volume 3 #5 (2020), it is revealed that following his death in Spider-Geddon, Spider-Man Noir was resurrected in a web-cocoon on his native Earth-90214, having had a vision of the spider-god telling him his "service" was not finished. Now slightly more introspective and glib, this Peter Parker officially starts working as a private investigator, adopting a slightly new look and a more stereotypical 1930s dialect (similar to his film incarnation from Spider-Man: Into the Spider-Verse). Miles Morales appears and teams-up with Spider-Man Noir to retrieve the spider-god's idol from the Nazis so it can be used to repair the trans-dimensional Web of Life and Destiny. The two succeed in getting the idol back, but Miles warns that taking it away from the Marvel Noir Earth may also remove the spider-god's protection, meaning Parker's next death will be permanent. Spider-Man Noir says he is fine with this as death is supposed to be permanent for everyone and he neither wants nor deserves special treatment.

=== Twilight in Babylon ===
In Spider-Man Noir – Twilight in Babylon, in 1939, a month after his team-up with Miles Morales, people are starting to realize the Spider-Man is alive and back in action. Peter has re-established ties with Aunt May and Mary Jane Watson, who are both grateful that "a miracle" brought him back from death. Both support his life as a vigilante, but May advises he act more honorably than his instincts sometimes tell him to. As the new series opens, J. Jonah Jameson helps Peter gain access to police crime scenes so the young private eye can investigate a murder and in exchange provide the Daily Bugle with the exclusive story. Peter's investigation into the death of Holly Babson, a waitress at the Black Cat club, leads him to fly to Europe alongside Holly's sister and museum curator, Huma Bergmann, to look more into a cicada gemstone that Holly was holding on to when she died. The two are eventually accompanied by Harry Charles, a pilot who is secretly part of the Dora Milaje named Hu-Ri, and Checkpoint Red, a guide in Istanbul to help them on their journey to Babylon sent by Tony Stark. Throughout their travels, they are pursued by the Nazis and their powerful new weapon Electro. As they approach the temple where the cicada gemstone originated, Huma double-crosses them and reveals that she is the goddess Inanna, who lured them into Babylon and allied with the Nazis. She combines the cicada stone with the M'Kraan crystal to open a portal to the Underworld, which brings back some of Spider-Man's deceased enemies in the process. During the fight, Peter receives a vision from the spider-god Ereshkigal, who turns out to be Inanna's sister and took on the form of Holly Babson. With her help, Spider-Man destroys the cicada stone and the M'Kraan crystal, defeating Inanna and his undead foes in the process. He later returns to New York where Jameson credits Huma for stopping the Nazis in Babylon.

=== The Gwen Stacy Affair ===
In Spider-Man Noir – The Gwen Stacy Affair, after temporarily parting ways with Felicia, Peter is hired by Gwen Stacy to investigate the death of her father George Stacy, a mob enforcer Peter had recently killed while operating as Spider-Man. Peter has a sexual affair with Gwen before finding out that someone has stolen his powers and taken over as Spider-Man.

== Powers and abilities ==
This incarnation of Spider-Man from Earth-90214 has the same basic powers as his classic counterpart: enhanced strength, speed, reflexes, resiliency, and agility proportionate to that of a spider. While the mainstream Spider-Man uses mechanical web-shooters, Spider-Man Noir has the power to shoot organic webbing from his wrists. In his original two mini-series, Spider-Man Noir does not create web-lines, his dark webbing always manifesting as a spray or net. After his resurrection, his web control is fine enough that he regularly creates web-lines to swing on and web-based projectiles to stun opponents. Through his association with club owner Felicia Hardy, his vigilante activities, his associates at the Daily Bugle, and his occupation as a private investigator, he has a network of contacts throughout the city and several informants in the gangs.

=== Equipment ===
In contrast to the mainstream Peter Parker, this Spider-Man's costume is mainly normal clothing of the era matched with a mask. The outfit includes kevlar armor, making it resistant to bullets and explosions. The "costume" part of his outfit includes a mask made with the headgear and the aviator glasses used by his uncle during the Great War. After Spider-Geddon, Spider-Man Noir adopts a more traditional version of the Spider-Man mask colored black and white, though he keeps the goggles rather than relying on built-in lenses. He also begins wearing a fedora with his mask and a new gun belt decorated by a spider-symbol.

Spider-Man Noir regularly uses .45 caliber pistols. He is a skilled marksman, adept in the use of various firearms such as revolvers and the tommy gun. He is willing to kill enemies in certain cases, but largely prefers to only injure criminals. Despite his superhuman abilities, Spider-Man Noir still relies on wearing glasses as Peter Parker.

== In other media ==
=== Television ===
- Elements of Spider-Man Noir are incorporated into an alternate timeline incarnation of Spider-Man called Slinger who appears in the Avengers Assemble episode "Planet Doom", voiced by Drake Bell.
- Spider-Man Noir appears in Ultimate Spider-Man, voiced by Milo Ventimiglia. This version is more serious, brooding and melancholy towards his hero work, resulting in him severing ties with his versions of May Parker and Mary Jane Watson before the "prime" Spider-Man helps him realize the value of having allies.
- Spider-Man Noir is the titular main character of the live-action series Spider-Noir, portrayed by Nicolas Cage. This version gained superpowers after being bitten by a mutated half-spider prisoner while liberating soldiers from a German POW camp at the end of World War I. He subsequently changed his name to Ben Reilly (his original name is unspecified in the series) and became a superhero for ten years after returning to New York City. He eventually retired his Spider persona after a criminal he caught took revenge on him by killing his fiancée, Ruby Williams. Five years later, while working as a private detective, Reilly becomes a vigilante once more after getting caught in a criminal conspiracy with the city's crime boss, Silvermane, and striking up a romance with Cat Hardy.

=== Film ===
- Spider-Man Noir appears in Spider-Man: Into the Spider-Verse, voiced by Nicolas Cage. This version speaks in a stereotypical "Transatlantic" 1930s dialect similar to Humphrey Bogart, James Cagney and Edward G. Robinson, all of whom Cage based the character on. Due to his universe being entirely in black and white, Noir is also unfamiliar with colors. He arrives in Miles Morales' universe along with Spider-Ham and Peni Parker due to the Kingpin's machinations before joining his fellow Spider-People in foiling the Kingpin's plans and returning to their respective home dimensions.
  - Spider-Man Noir makes a non-speaking cameo appearance in Spider-Man: Across the Spider-Verse.
  - Spider-Man Noir will appear in Spider-Man: Beyond the Spider-Verse, with Cage reprising his role.

=== Video games ===
- Spider-Man Noir appears as a playable character in Spider-Man: Shattered Dimensions, voiced by Christopher Daniel Barnes. Madame Web improves his web-shooting capabilities and tasks him with retrieving fragments of the Tablet of Order and Chaos from his universe's versions of Hammerhead, the Vulture, and the Goblin before bringing him and three of his fellow Spider-Men together to fight Mysterio after he absorbs the restored Tablet and destroys reality.
- Spider-Man Noir appears as an unlockable playable character in Marvel Super Hero Squad Online, voiced by Yuri Lowenthal.
- Spider-Man Noir's suit was available as a GameStop pre-order exclusive alternate skin for Spider-Man in The Amazing Spider-Man 2.
- Spider-Man Noir's suit was available as an alternate skin for Spider-Man in Marvel Heroes.
- Spider-Man Noir appears as an unlockable playable character in Spider-Man Unlimited.
- Spider-Man Noir appears as an unlockable playable character in Marvel Avengers Alliance.
- Spider-Man Noir appears as an unlockable playable character in Lego Marvel Super Heroes 2.
- Spider-Man Noir's suit is available as an alternate skin for the titular character of Spider-Man (2018).
  - Spider-Man Noir's suit, based on the Spider-Man: Into the Spider-Verse incarnation, appears as an alternate skin for Peter Parker / Spider-Man in Spider-Man 2.
- Spider-Man Noir appears as an unlockable skin in Fortnite (2024).
- Spider-Man Noir appears in Marvel Snap.

=== Miscellaneous ===
An alternate universe variant of Homer Simpson, inspired by Spider-Man Noir, appears in The Simpsons episode "Treehouse of Horror XXXI", voiced by Dan Castellaneta.
