= Typeface (character) =

Publication information
- Publisher: Marvel Comics
- First appearance: Peter Parker: Spider-Man vol. 2 #23 (November 2000)
- Created by: Paul Jenkins; Mark Buckingham

In-story information
- Alter ego: Gordon Thomas
- Partnerships: Secret Avengers
- Notable aliases: Geordie, Captain A-Face, Sesame Street Pete, Shakespeare
- Abilities: Skilled and intelligent combatant

Typeface (Gordon Thomas) is a fictional character appearing in American comic books published by Marvel Comics. He first appeared in Peter Parker: Spider-Man vol. 2 #23 (November 2000), and was created by Paul Jenkins and Mark Buckingham.

== Fictional character biography ==
Gordon Thomas fought in an unknown war for the U.S. Army, during which his brother Joey was killed. Upon his return to America, Thomas's wife leaves him and takes their son with her.

Feeling outcast, Thomas becomes a signsmith (one who makes signs). He is happy for a time until George Finch buys the company he is working for, Ace Signs, resulting in Thomas being laid off. Thomas starts to hate everything that went wrong in his life and decides to become a super-villain, calling himself Typeface. He uses a grease pencil to write letters on his face, including a large, red "R" on his forehead, for "retribution". He begins committing vandalism throughout the city, and while attacking local thugs, he catches the attention of Spider-Man. Typeface uses his giant letters as weapons and manages to defeat Spider-Man.

Typeface later seeks revenge against George Finch, but is stopped by Spider-Man. Typeface wants to kill Spider-Man for intervening, but when he sees the webslinger being attacked by the Spider-Hybrid, he has a flashback to the words his brother Joey once gave him: "Just live, man." Typeface decides to help Spider-Man defeat the Spider-Hybrid, and renounces his desire to kill Finch. However, Finch decides to exact revenge on Typeface for humiliating him, and finds the remote to the bombs Thomas would have used to kill him. Finch sets them off and demolishes an entire building and for a time it was believed that Typeface died in the explosion.

=== Civil War ===
Returning in Marvel's Civil War: Front Line, Typeface has chosen to side against the Superhuman Registration Act, motivated by his brother's legacy. Iron Man and S.H.I.E.L.D. agents attack, capturing Typeface and many other members of the group. The prisoners are taken to a maximum security prison in the Negative Zone, where Typeface befriends Robbie Baldwin. After escaping the Negative Zone, Typeface is slammed into a bus by Venom and believed dead.

A recovered Typeface is later shown among the patrons of an underground casino that Spider-Man, Deadpool, and Saturn visit on Christmas.

== Reception ==
In 2020, CBR.com ranked Typeface 10th in their "Marvel: 10 Famous Villains From The 2000s To Bring Back" list.

== In other media ==
An alternate universe version of Typeface appears in Spider-Man: Across the Spider-Verse, voiced by an uncredited actor.
