= David Hine =

English comic book artist and writer

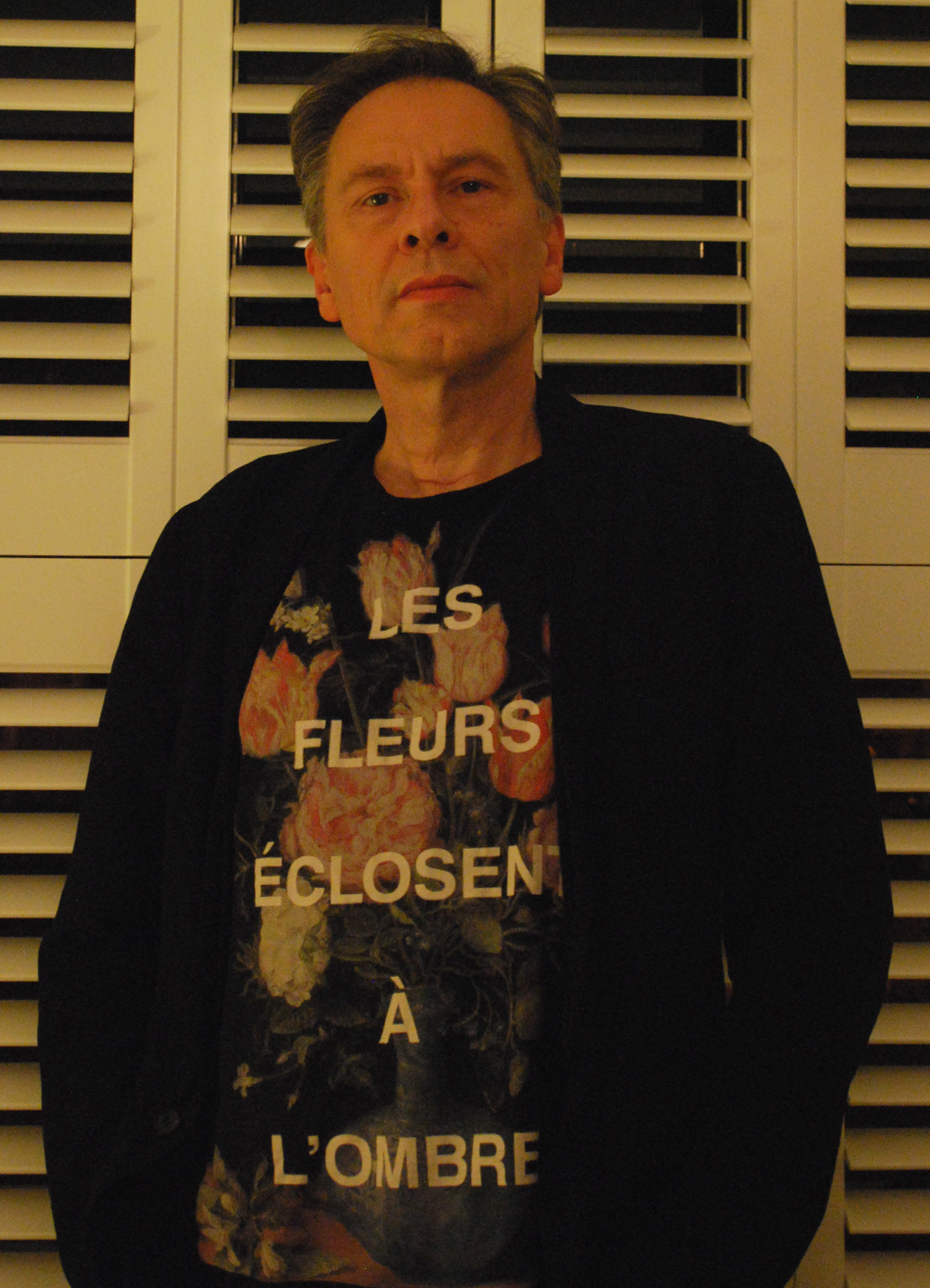
- Born: March 20, 1956 (age 70)
- Areas: Writer, Penciller, Inker
- Notable works: Strange Embrace; District X Spawn; Spider-Man Noir; The Bulletproof Coffin; The Darkness

David Hine (born 20 March 1956) is an English comic book writer and artist best known for co-creating the characters Spider-Man Noir and Nightrunner, lengthy runs on Image Comics superhero titles Spawn and The Darkness, as well as his creator-owned series Strange Embrace and The Bulletproof Coffin.

== Career ==
David Hine started out as an artist in the early 1980s, inking numerous titles for Marvel UK and illustrating short stories and serials for various anthologies, such as Sticky Fingers in Crisis and Tao de Moto in 2000 AD, both written by Myra Hancock. Hine's first major works were Mambo, the futuristic police series published in 2000 AD between 1994 and 1996, and the mini-series Strange Embrace, published by Atomeka in 1993, both of which he wrote and drew. Ten years after its initial publication, Strange Embrace was reprinted as a collected edition by Active Images, which attracted the attention of Marvel's then-Editor-in-Chief Joe Quesada and Spawn creator Todd McFarlane.

Hine at SDCC 2009

In 2004, Hine joined Marvel as the writer for an X-Men spin-off title District X, which he wrote for 14 issues and followed up with a few more X-Men-adjacent mini-series, such as Mutopia X, X-Men: The 198 and Civil War: X-Men. Hine's other notable work for Marvel includes the six-issue mini-series Silent War, drawn by Frazer Irving and featuring the Inhumans waging war against the United States, and the character Spider-Man Noir, which he co-created with Fabrice Sapolsky and artist Carmine Di Giandomenico for the Marvel Noir imprint.

Between 2005 and 2008, Hine also handled the writing duties on the long-running Image superhero horror series Spawn. Shortly before the end of his stint on Spawn, Hine debuted as a DC Comics writer with a one-shot focusing on Batman's villain Two-Face, drawn by Andy Clarke, and a four-issue storyline in the team-up series The Brave and the Bold, featuring Green Lantern, Green Arrow and The Phantom Stranger, drawn by Doug Braithwaite. Hine continued working on Batman-related titles and co-created the character Nightrunner, who first appeared in a two-part storyline running in Detective Comics Annual and Batman Annual and returned in the last issue of Batman and Robin before the series' relaunch as part of The New 52 publishing initiative. In 2010, Hine joined artist Moritat as the new writer on then-recently launched ongoing series starring Will Eisner's The Spirit.

Hine continued working with Image, publishing two creator-owned series, The Bulletproof Coffin with Shaky Kane and Storm Dogs with Doug Braithwaite, and taking over another of the publisher's long-running superhero horror series The Darkness. Hine has also contributed several arcs to Avatar's anthology series Crossed: Badlands, created a number of short- and long-form works with artist Mark Stafford and penned a three-chapter serial starring The Dark Judges for Judge Dredd Megazine.

In 2023, Hine returned to 2000 AD with Void Runners, a psychedelic sci-fi strip drawn by Boo Cook.

== Bibliography ==
=== UK publishers ===
- 2000 AD Annual '81: "The Man from 2000" (as artist, written by Oleh Stepaniuk, anthology, IPC Media, 1980)
- Knockabout:
  - Knockabout Comics (anthology):
    - "Dead End" (script and art, in #2, 1981)
    - "Riot" (as artist, written by Vikki Liogier, in #3, 1981)
    - "Final Daze" (script and art, in #6, 1983)
    - "The Weird Case of the Disappearing Tourists" (script and art, in #8, 1984)
  - Knockabout Trial Special: "The Adventures of Mike Macho" (script and art, anthology graphic novel, 64 pages, 1984, ISBN 0-86166-012-9)
- Warrior #25–26 + Spring Special: "Big Ben" (as inker — on Will Simpson; written by Dez Skinn, anthology, Quality Communications, 1984–1985; 1996)
- Willyprods/Small Time Ink:
  - Strip AIDS: "Mike Macho Plays It Safe" (script and art, 1-page strip in the anthology graphic novel, 56 pages, 1987, ISBN 0-9512522-0-8)
  - Heartbreak Hotel #3: "Catch the Wind" (script and art, adaptation of the eponymous song, anthology, 1988)
- Blast! #6: "Curse of the Transvestite" (with Colin de Suinn, anthology, John Brown Publishing, 1991)
- Strange Embrace #1–4 (script and art, Atomeka, 1993) collected as Strange Embrace (tpb, 208 pages, Active Images, 2003, ISBN 0-9740567-2-3)
  - A colourised version of the series (alongside some of Hine's short stories) was published by Image as Strange Embrace #1–8 (2007–2008)
  - The new edition was subsequently collected as Strange Embrace and Other Nightmares (hc, 240 pages, 2008, ISBN 1-58240-914-5)
- Rugrats (as inker, anthology, Panini UK):
  - "Waterland" (on Dave King; written by David Leach, in #3, 1996)
  - "Photo Session" (on Mike Hadley; written by Bambos Georgiou, in #6, 1996)
  - "The Case of the Maltese Reptar" (on Adrian Salmon; written by David Leach, in #9, 1996)
  - "Children's Zoo" (on Mike Hadley; co-written by Chris Dows and Colin Clayton, in #10, 1996)
  - "Tommy the Artist" (on Adrian Salmon; written by Bambos Georgiou, in #11, 1996)
  - "Little Baby Angelica" (on Mike Hadley; written by Ian Carney, in #13, 1997)
- SelfMadeHero:
  - The Lovecraft Anthology Volume 1: "The Colour Out of Space" (adaptation of the short story by H. P. Lovecraft; script by Hine, art by Mark Stafford, anthology graphic novel, 120 pages, 2011, ISBN 1-906-83828-3)
  - The Man Who Laughs (adaptation of the novel by Victor Hugo; script by Hine, art by Mark Stafford, graphic novel, 160 pages, Eye Classics, 2013, ISBN 1-9068-3858-5)
  - Lip Hook: A Tale of Rural Unease (with Mark Stafford, graphic novel, 160 pages, 2018, ISBN 1-910-59357-5)
- Aces Weekly #5: "Cowboys and Insects" (with Shaky Kane, digital anthology published by David Lloyd, 2012)
  - The story was first published in print by Floating World Comics as Cowboys and Insects (one-shot, 2016)
- Meanwhile... vol. 2 #1–10: "The Bad, Bad Place" (with Mark Stafford, anthology, Soaring Penguin, 2014–2021) collected as The Bad, Bad Place (hc, 120 pages, 2019, ISBN 1-9080-3027-5)
- Think of a City page 33 (script and art, Internet art project, 2015)
- Rebellion:
  - Judge Dredd Megazine #400–409, 424–433, 449–458: "The Dark Judges" (with Nick Percival, anthology, 2018–2023)
  - 2000 AD #2334–2335, 2337–2342, 2450–2459: "Void Runners" (with Boo Cook, anthology, 2023–2025)

==== Marvel UK ====
- Spider-Man and the Zoids (as inker for the Zoids co-feature):
  - on Geoff Senior (in #6, written by Ian Rimmer, 1986)
  - on Kev Hopgood (in #8–11, 15–17, 32–35, 40–42 and 44, written by Ian Rimmer, Steve Alan (#32–35) and Grant Morrison (#40–42 and 44), 1986–1987)
  - on Steve Yeowell (in #43 and 45–49, written by Grant Morrison, 1986–1987)
- The Transformers #75: "In the National Interest, Part 2" (as inker — on Will Simpson; written by Simon Furman, 1986)
- Action Force (as inker):
  - "Fast Feud!" (on Geoff Senior; written by Simon Furman, in Action Force #7, 1987)
  - "Gas Masque!" (on Brett Ewins; written by James Hill, in Action Force #23, 1987)
  - "Smooth Operators" (on Kev Hopgood; written by Dan Abnett, in Action Force Monthly #7, 1988)
- ThunderCats (as inker — on Martin Griffiths):
  - "Invasion, Part 1" (written by Ian Rimmer, in #11, 1987)
  - "Assault on the Onyx Pyramid" (written by James Hill, in #16–17, 1987)
- The Real Ghostbusters (as inker, anthology):
  - "The Ghost Under the Hood!" (on Anthony Williams; written by John Freeman, in #1, 1988)
  - "The Worst Ghost in the World" (on Anthony Williams; written by Ian Rimmer, in #10, 1988)
  - "Winston's Diary: Thursday, 1st September 1988" (on Martin Griffiths; illustrated prose story written by Dan Abnett, in #13, 1988)
  - "The Doomsday Mask!" (on Andy Lanning; written by John Carnell, in #14, 1988)
  - "Winston's Diary: Tuesday, 20th September 1988" (on John Geering; illustrated prose story written by John Freeman, in #15, 1988)
  - "Winston's Diary: Sunday, 2nd October 1988" (on Phil Elliott; illustrated prose story written by Ian Rimmer, in #17, 1988)
  - "Computergeist!" (on Brian Williamson; illustrated prose story written by John Carnell, in #18, 1988)
  - "The Spook from Outer Space!" (on Phil Gascoine; written by Ian Rimmer, in Annual '89, 1988)
  - "Haunted Melodies" (on Kev Hopgood; written by Sue Flaxman, in #25, 1988)
  - "The Boy Who Cried Ghoul!" (on Doug Braithwaite; illustrated prose story written by John Freeman, in #26, 1988)
- Doctor Who Magazine #136–138: "Claws of the Klathi" (as inker — on Kev Hopgood; written by Mike Collins, 1988)
- Death's Head #2–3 (as inker — on Bryan Hitch; written by Simon Furman, 1989)
- Strip #8: "Ephraim, Utah" (as inker — on Doug Braithwaite; written by Michael Bonner, anthology, 1990)
- Dark Angel #11–13 (as inker — on Salvador Larroca; written by Bernie Jaye, 1993)
- Warheads: Black Dawn #2: "Blood Sinful!" (as inker — on Charlie Adlard; written by Craig Huston, 1993)
- Marvel Frontier Comics Unlimited: "The Locked Room" (script and art, co-feature, 1994) collected in Marvel Frontier Comics: The Complete Collection (tpb, 416 pages, Marvel, 2016, ISBN 0-7851-9926-8)

==== Fleetway ====
- Crisis (anthology):
  - "Sticky Fingers" (as artist, written by Myra Hancock, in #15–21 and 23–27, 1989)
  - "Didn't You Love My Brother?" (as artist, written by Tony Allen, in #35, 1990)
  - "China in Crisis" (as artist, written by Tony Allen, in #42 and 45, 1990)
  - "Up on the Roof" (script and art, in #57, 1991) collected in Strange Embrace and Other Nightmares (hc, 240 pages, Image, 2008, ISBN 1-58240-914-5)
  - "Worms" (script and art, in #62, 1991) collected in Strange Embrace and Other Nightmares (hc, 240 pages, Image, 2008, ISBN 1-58240-914-5)
- Revolver: The Horror Special: "Martin" (script and art, co-feature, 1990) collected in Strange Embrace and Other Nightmares (hc, 240 pages, Image, 2008, ISBN 1-58240-914-5)
- The Comic Relief Comic (as artist, among other contributors, one-shot, 1991)
- 2000 AD (anthology):
  - Tao de Moto (as artist, written by Myra Hancock, in #723–740, 742–749 and Yearbook '92, 1991)
  - The Spider: "Vicious Games" (as inker — on John Higgins; written by Mark Millar, in Action Special, 1992)
  - Maniac 5: "War Journal" (as artist, written by Mark Millar, in Sci-Fi Special '93, 1993)
  - Mambo (script and art, in #889–896, 940–947 and 1014–1022, 1994–1996)
  - Tharg's Future Shocks: "Life Sentence" (script and art, in #893, 1994)
  - Judge Dredd: "Blowout" (as artist, written by John Wagner, in #949, 1995) collected in Judge Dredd: The Complete Case Files Volume 23 (tpb, 320 pages, Rebellion, 2014, ISBN 1-78108-252-9)
  - Vector 13 (Series 1): "Case Nine: Spear of Destiny" (as artist, written by Peter Hogan, in #959, 1995)

=== Marvel Comics ===
- The Sleeze Brothers #1 (as inker — on Andy Lanning; written by John Carnell, Epic, 1989) collected in The Sleeze Brothers File (tpb, 144 pages, 1990, ISBN 1-854-00242-2)
- District X:
  - X-Men Unlimited vol. 2 #2: "District X" (with Adi Granov, anthology, 2004) collected in Astonishing X-Men Companion (tpb, 168 pages, 2020, ISBN 1-302-92285-8)
  - District X (with David Yardin (#1–3 and 5), Lan Medina and Mike Perkins (#6), Marvel Knights, 2004–2005) collected as:
    - Mr. M (collects #1–6, tpb, 144 pages, 2005, ISBN 0-7851-1444-0)
    - Underground (collects #7–14 and the short story from X-Men Unlimited vol. 2 #2, tpb, 200 pages, 2005, ISBN 0-7851-1602-8)
  - Mutopia X #1–5 (with Lan Medina, 2005–2006)
    - Collected as House of M: Mutopia X (tpb, 120 pages, 2006, ISBN 0-7851-1811-X)
    - Collected in House of M: No More Mutants (hc, 352 pages, 2010, ISBN 0-7851-3883-8)
- Daredevil: Redemption #1–6 (with Michael Gaydos, Marvel Knights, 2005) collected as Daredevil: Redemption (tpb, 144 pages, 2005, ISBN 0-7851-1566-8)
- X-Men: Colossus — Bloodline #1–5 (with Jorge Lucas, 2005–2006) collected as X-Men: Colossus — Bloodline (tpb, 120 pages, 2006, ISBN 0-7851-1900-0)
- X-Men: Decimation Omnibus (hc, 1,072 pages, 2025, ISBN 1-3029-6024-5) includes:
  - Son of M #1–6 (with Roy Allan Martinez, 2006) also collected as Decimation: Son of M (tpb, 144 pages, 2006, ISBN 0-7851-1970-1)
  - X-Men: The 198 #1–5 (with Jim Muniz, 2006) also collected as Decimation: X-Men — The 198 (tpb, 168 pages, 2006, ISBN 0-7851-1994-9)
- Civil War: X-Men #1–4 (with Yanick Paquette and Aaron Lopresti (#3), 2006)
  - Collected as Civil War: X-Men (tpb, 112 pages, 2007, ISBN 0-7851-2313-X)
  - Collected in Civil War: X-Men (hc, 520 pages, 2011, ISBN 0-7851-4884-1)
- What If...? (series of one-shots):
  - What If...? (featuring X-Men: Deadly Genesis): "What If Xavier's Second Team Had Survived?" (with David Yardin, 2007) collected in What If: Event Horizon (tpb, 176 pages, 2007, ISBN 0-7851-2183-8)
  - What If... Annihilation Reached Earth? (with Mico Suayan and Rafael Kayanan, 2008) collected in What If: Civil War (tpb, 120 pages, 2008, ISBN 0-7851-3036-5)
- Silent War #1–6 (with Frazer Irving, 2007) collected as Silent War (tpb, 144 pages, 2007, ISBN 0-7851-2425-X)
- Spider-Man Noir (scripted by Hine from plots by Hine and Fabrice Sapolsky):
  - Spider-Man Noir: The Complete Collection (tpb, 264 pages, 2019, ISBN 1-3029-1958-X) collects:
    - Spider-Man Noir #1–4 (art by Carmine di Giandomenico, 2009) also collected as Spider-Man Noir (hc, 96 pages, 2009, ISBN 0-7851-3944-3; tpb, 2009, ISBN 0-78512-923-5)
    - Spider-Man Noir: Eyes without a Face #1–4 (art by Carmine Di Giandomenico, 2010) also collected as Spider-Man Noir: Eyes without a Face (hc, 112 pages, 2010, ISBN 0-7851-4444-7; tpb, 2010, ISBN 0-7851-4450-1)
    - Edge of Spider-Verse #1 (art by Richard Isanove, anthology, 2014) also collected in The Amazing Spider-Man: Edge of Spider-Verse (tpb, 112 pages, 2015, ISBN 0-785-19728-1)

=== DC Comics ===
- The Big Book of Weirdos: "Mad Jack Mytton" (as artist, written by Carl Posey, anthology graphic novel, 224 pages, Paradox Press, 1995, ISBN 1-5638-9180-8)
- Joker's Asylum: Two-Face (with Andy Clarke, one-shot, 2008) collected in Joker's Asylum Volume 1 (tpb, 128 pages, 2008, ISBN 1-4012-1955-1)
- The Brave and the Bold vol. 3 #19–22 (with Doug Braithwaite, 2009) collected in The Brave and the Bold: Without Sin (tpb, 144 pages, 2009, ISBN 1-4012-2286-2)
- Faces of Evil: Deathstroke (with Georges Jeanty, one-shot, 2009) collected in Teen Titans: Ravager — Fresh Hell (tpb, 144 pages, 2010, ISBN 1-4012-2919-0)
- Batman: Arkham Reborn (tpb, 144 pages, 2010, ISBN 1-4012-2708-2) collects:
  - Batman: Battle for the Cowl — Arkham Asylum (with Jeremy Haun, one-shot, 2009) also collected in Batman: Battle for the Cowl Companion (tpb, 128 pages, 2009, ISBN 1-4012-2495-4)
  - Arkham Reborn #1–3 (with Jeremy Haun, 2009–2010)
  - Detective Comics #864–865: "Beneath the Mask" (with Jeremy Haun, 2010)
- The Spirit vol. 7 #4–13, 15–16 (with Moritat and John Paul Leon (#16), First Wave, 2010–2011)
  - Issues #4–7 are collected in Will Eisner's The Spirit: Angel Smerti (tpb, 168 pages, 2011, ISBN 1-4012-3026-1)
  - Another collected edition was solicited for a 2011 release but subsequently cancelled: Will Eisner's The Spirit: The Clockwork Killer (tpb, 200 pages, ISBN 1-4012-3309-0)
- Azrael vol. 2 #10–18 (with Guillem March (#10–13) and Cliff Richards (#14–18), 2010–2011)
  - Issues #14–18 are collected in Batman: Gotham Shall Be Judged (tpb, 200 pages, 2012, ISBN 1-4012-3378-3)
  - A collected edition that would include issues #10–13 was solicited for a 2011 release but subsequently cancelled: Azrael: The Killer of Saints (tpb, 168 pages, ISBN 1-4012-2986-7)
- Detective Comics:
  - "Impostors" (with Scott McDaniel, in #867–870, 2010) collected as Batman: Impostors (tpb, 128 pages, 2011, ISBN 1-4012-3144-6)
  - "All the Rage, Part One of Two" (with Agustín Padilla, co-feature in Annual #12, 2011)
- Batman:
  - "All the Rage, Part Two of Two" (with Agustín Padilla and Andres Guinaldo, co-feature in Annual #26, 2011)
  - "Judgment on Gotham, Parts 1 and 4" (with Guillem March, in #708–709, 2011) collected in Batman: Gotham Shall Be Judged (tpb, 200 pages, 2012, ISBN 1-4012-3378-3)
- Batman and Robin #26: "Earthly Delights: Scenes from a Work in Progress" (with Greg Tocchini and Andrei Bressan, 2011)

=== Image Comics ===
- Spawn (with Philip Tan, Lan Medina (#165), Brian Haberlin, Bing Cansino (#174–175 and 180) and Mike Mayhew (#179), Todd McFarlane Productions, 2005–2008) collected as:
  - Issue #150 is co-written by Hine with Todd McFarlane and Brian Holguin; issues #180–184 are co-written by Hine and Todd McFarlane.
    - Origins Collection Book Twelve (includes #150–151, hc, 368 pages, 2023, ISBN 1-5343-9976-3)
    - Origins Collection Book Thirteen (collects #152–163, hc, 312 pages, 2023, ISBN 1-5343-9813-9)
    - Origins Collection Book Fourteen (collects #164–176, hc, 320 pages, 2024, ISBN 1-5343-9700-0)
    - Origins Collection Book Fifteen (includes #177–184, hc, 296 pages, 2024, ISBN 1-5343-8782-X)
    - Origins Collection Volume 25 (includes #150–153, tpb, 160 pages, 2023, ISBN 1-5343-9974-7)
    - Origins Collection Volume 26 (collects #154–160, tpb, 184 pages, 2023, ISBN 1-5343-9834-1)
    - Origins Collection Volume 27 (collects #161–166, tpb, 152 pages, 2023, ISBN 1-5343-9821-X)
    - Origins Collection Volume 28 (collects #167–172, tpb, 160 pages, 2024, ISBN 1-5343-9740-X)
    - Origins Collection Volume 29 (collects #173–178, tpb, 144 pages, 2024, ISBN 1-5343-2727-4)
    - Origins Collection Volume 30 (collects #179–184, tpb, 160 pages, 2025, ISBN 1-5343-2896-3)
- Elephantmen:
  - "The Last Thing I Remember" (as artist, written by Richard Starkings, co-feature in #6, 2007) collected in Elephantmen: Wounded Animals (hc, 168 pages, 2007, ISBN 1-58240-691-X; tpb, 2008, ISBN 1-58240-934-X)
  - "The Long and Ghastly Kitchen" (script and art, in #41, 2012) collected in Elephantmen: Earthly Desires (hc, 312 pages, 2013, ISBN 1-6070-6752-8; tpb, 2014, ISBN 1-60706-786-2)
- The Bulletproof Coffin (with Shaky Kane):
  - The Bulletproof Coffin #1–6 (2010) collected as The Bulletproof Coffin (tpb, 200 pages, 2011, ISBN 1-6070-6368-9)
  - The Bulletproof Coffin: Disinterred #1–6 (2012) collected as The Bulletproof Coffin: Disinterred (tpb, 200 pages, 2012, ISBN 1-6070-6583-5)
  - A Bulletproof Coffin One-Shot: The 1000 Yard Stare (one-shot, 2017)
- The Darkness (Top Cow):
  - The Darkness: Four Horsemen #1–4 (with Jeff Wamester, 2010–2011)
  - The Darkness (with Jeremy Haun and Laura Braga (co-feature in #114), 2012–2013) collected as:
    - The Darkness: Rebirth Volume 1 (collects #101–105, tpb, 144 pages, 2012, ISBN 1-6070-6585-1)
    - The Darkness: Rebirth Volume 2 (collects #106–110, tpb, 160 pages, 2013, ISBN 1-6070-6672-6)
    - Progeny Volume 1 (includes #111, tpb, 144 pages, 2013, ISBN 1-6070-6748-X)
    - The Darkness: Rebirth Volume 3 (collects #112–116, tpb, 160 pages, 2014, ISBN 1-6070-6806-0)
  - In 2013, Top Cow announced the 3-issue limited series Darkness Falls, to be written by Hine and drawn by Stjepan Šejić.
  - The limited series ended up being unpublished, and its intended storyline was condensed to two issues with art by a different artist:
    - Witchblade #180–181: "Darkness Falls: The Death of Jackie Estacado" (with Gabriel Riarte, 2015)
  - The two-issue storyline was later collected in Witchblade: Borne Again Volume 3 (tpb, 128 pages, 2015, ISBN 1-6321-5297-5)
- Storm Dogs (with Doug Braithwaite):
  - Liberty Annual '12: "Let Freedoms Grow" (anthology, 2012) also collected in CBLDF Presents: Liberty (hc, 216 pages, 2014, ISBN 1-6070-6937-7; tpb, 2016, ISBN 1-6070-6996-2)
  - Storm Dogs #1–6 (2012–2013) collected as Storm Dogs (tpb, 160 pages, 2013, ISBN 1-6070-6825-7)
- September Mourning #3–4 (with Tina Valentino, digital, Top Cow, 2018) collected in September Mourning: The Complete Collection (tpb, 128 pages, 2019, ISBN 1-534-31030-4)
  - Hine's involvement in the project was first announced in 2011, as the supposed writer for a tie-in webcomic to be drawn by Michael Broussard and serialized on the defunct MTV Geek website.
- Where We Live: A Benefit for the Survivors in Las Vegas: "The Long Flight" (co-written by Hine and Brian Haberlin, art by Haberlin, anthology graphic novel, 336 pages, 2018, ISBN 1-5343-0822-9)
- Shadowline:
  - Sonata (co-written by Hine and Brian Haberlin, art by Haberlin, 2019–2020) collected as:
    - Valley of the Gods (collects #1–6, tpb, 192 pages, 2019, ISBN 1-5343-1465-2)
    - The Citadel (collects #7–12, tpb, 184 pages, 2020, ISBN 1-5343-1617-5)
  - The Marked (co-written by Hine and Brian Haberlin, art by Haberlin):
    - The Marked (2019–2020) collected as:
      - Fresh Ink (collects #1–5, tpb, 176 pages, 2020, ISBN 1-534-31467-9)
      - Origins (collects #6–10, tpb, 160 pages, 2021, ISBN 1-5343-1673-6)
    - The Marked Halloween Special (co-written by Hine and Brian Haberlin, art by Haberlin, 2022)
  - Jules Verne's Lighthouse #1–5 (co-written by Hine and Brian Haberlin, art by Haberlin, 2021) collected as Jules Verne's Lighthouse (tpb, 144 pages, 2021, ISBN 1-5343-1993-X)
- Pete Townshend's Life House (adaptation of the rock opera by Pete Townshend co-written by Hine and James Harvey, art by Harvey, graphic novel, 172 pages, 2024, ISBN 1-5343-9760-4)

=== Other US publishers ===
- Renegade Romance #2: "True Romance" (script and art, anthology, Renegade Press, 1988)
- Brickman Begins! (script and art, untitled one-page strip created for the collected edition; tpb, 160 pages, Active Images, 2005, ISBN 0-9740-5678-2)
- Poison Candy Volume 1 (with Hans Steinbach, 192 pages, 2007, TokyoPop, ISBN 1-4278-0080-4)
  - Volume 2 was published in 2020 in eBook format.
- Days Missing #2: "September 12, 1815" (with Chris Burnham, Archaia Studios, 2009) collected in Days Missing (hc, 144 pages, 2010, ISBN 1-9323-8684-X)
- Radical:
  - FVZA: Federal Vampire and Zombie Agency #1–3 (with Roy Allan Martinez, 2009–2010) collected as FVZA: Federal Vampire and Zombie Agency (tpb, 144 pages, 2011, ISBN 1-9354-1705-3)
  - Ryder on the Storm #1–3 (with Wayne Nichols, 2010–2011)
  - Hollow Point #0 (with Elia Bonetti, 2010)
    - The story is written by Hine from a concept by Ron L. Brinkerhoff.
    - This release is a preview for an unpublished six-issue limited series of the same name.
- Avatar:
  - Crossed: Badlands (anthology):
    - "The Golden Road" (with Georges Duarte (#14) and Eduardo Vienna, in #14–18, 2012) collected in Crossed Volume 5 (hc, 240 pages, 2013, ISBN 1-5929-1186-2; tpb, 2013, ISBN 1-5929-1185-4)
    - "Gore Angels" (with German Erramouspe, in #40–43, 2013) collected in Crossed Volume 8 (tpb, 192 pages, 2014, ISBN 1-592-91222-2)
    - "Five Bloody Fingers" (with Nahuel Lopez, in #71–74, 2015) collected as Crossed Volume 13 (tpb, 144 pages, 2015, ISBN 1-5929-1260-5)
  - Night of the Living Dead: Aftermath (with German Erramouspe, Ernesto Chaparro (#7) and Tomas Aira, 2012–2013) collected as:
    - Volume 1 (collects #1–6, tpb, 160 pages, 2013, ISBN 1-5929-1205-2)
    - Volume 2 (collects #7–12, tpb, 160 pages, 2014, ISBN 1-5929-1224-9)
- Second Sight #1–6 (with Alberto Ponticelli, Aftershock, 2016) collected as Second Sight: The Evil That Men Do... (tpb, 144 pages, 2017, ISBN 1-9350-0290-2)
- The Broken Frontier Anthology: "Quin Returns" (with Mark Stafford, anthology graphic novel, 312 pages, A Wave Blue World, 2016, ISBN 0-9824-5394-9)
- Faster Than Light: Mission Log #1–2 (with Brian Haberlin, digital comics published by Anomaly Productions at experienceanomaly.com, 2016)
- Heavy Metal #298: "Bug House" (with Mark Stafford, anthology, Heavy Metal Media, 2020)
- Bulletproof Coffin: Giant! Cease to Exist (with Shaky Kane, graphic novel, 72 pages, Oni Press, 2027, ISBN 979-8894883953)

=== Cover illustrations ===
- The Transformers #76, 107, 128 (Marvel UK, 1986–1987)
- Action Force Winter Special (as inker — on Mike Collins, Marvel UK, 1987)
- ThunderCats #13–15 (as inker — on Kev Hopgood, Marvel UK, 1987)
- The Sleeze Brothers #6 (as inker — on Andy Lanning, Epic, 1989)
- 2000 AD #666, 678, 690, 842, Winter Special '93 (Fleetway, 1990–1993)
- Deadline #67 (Deadline Publications, 1994)

=== Other work ===
- The Real Ghostbusters #14 (illustration for a cut-out mask, Marvel UK, 1988)
- The Transformers Annual '89 (mini-poster featuring Megatron, Marvel UK, 1989)
- Crisis #4–6, 9–10: "New Statesmen" (chapter illustrations, Fleetway, 1988–1989)
- 2000 AD: "Star Scans" (full-page back cover illustrations, Fleetway):
  - "Judge Dredd" (in #651, 1989)
  - "Strontium Dog" (in #669, 1990)
- Elephantmen #25 (one-page illustration, Image, 2010)

Preceded by Todd McFarlane; Brian Holguin	Spawn writer 2005–2008	Succeeded by Todd McFarlane
Preceded by Greg Rucka	Detective Comics writer 2010	Succeeded by Scott Snyder
Preceded by Phil Hester	The Darkness writer 2012–2013	Succeeded by Marc Silvestri
