= Thunderclap (comics) =

Superhero published by marvel comics

- Thunderclap in Civil War Frontline #3, art by Ramon Bachs.

Publication information
- Publisher: Marvel Comics
- First appearance: Spider-Man Weekly #607 (October 1984)
- Created by: Mike Collins (writer); Barry Kitson (artist)

In-story information
- Alter ego: Stanley George Johnson
- Species: Human
- Team affiliations: None
- Abilities: Sonic boom projection via metal gloves Wears cowl which contains protective silicone cups and an electronic device

Thunderclap (Stanley George Johnson) is a fictional superhero appearing in American comic books published by Marvel Comics. The character was created by Marvel UK a division of Marvel Comics.

== Publication history ==
Thunderclap first appeared in Spider-Man Weekly #607 (October 1984), and was created by Mike Collins and Barry Kitson.

== Fictional character biography ==
Born in West Bromwich, England, Stanley George Johnson was a struggling electronics salesman until he decided to cannibalize together other people's technology to create a pair of hydraulically powered gloves that could create sonic booms. Soon, he left England for New York, New York and took the name Thunderclap.

Thunderclap's first appearance on the superhero scene comes when Spider-Man is trying to help police officers prevent a robber from escaping. As Spider-Man is about to stop the disaster, Thunderclap intervenes, slamming his hands together to create sonic booms that cause massive property damage while stopping the burglars. Spider-Man leaves after lecturing Thunderclap, and Thunderclap apologizes to the police for the damage he has caused. When the press arrive, however, Thunderclap introduces himself and blames Spider-Man for the property damage. Thunderclap is declared a true hero by the Daily Bugle.

=== Civil War ===
Years later, during the 2006 "Civil War" storyline, Thunderclap is seen battling the superhero Bantam. The fight, which is witnessed by Sally Floyd, is over Thunderclap's refusal to comply with the Superhuman Registration Act and Bantam's efforts to bring him in. The battle concludes when Thunderclap knocks Bantam into a gas truck, which explodes and kills him. Thunderclap tries to apologize but, feeling too ashamed, disappears into a nearby alley. Floyd, in a later issue of Frontline, wonders about the convenience of the gas truck being so close to the battle.

== Equipment ==
Thunderclap's piston-like metal gloves are connected to a hydraulic device in the back of his suit which uses potential and kinetic energy that allow the gloves to collide together faster than the speed of sound. The resulting sonic boom (approximately 2000 decibels) is released outwards in a destructive energy sphere which strikes any matter with which it comes into contact with tremendous impact.

The sonic boom also has the tendency to temporarily deafen and disorientate anyone in the immediate area. Thunderclap's cowl is outfitted with protective silicone cups on the sides and an electronic device which muffle the sound of his sonic booms while amplifying quieter sounds to higher decibel levels.
