= Aldrich Killian =

Marvel Comics supervillain

Publication information
- Publisher: Marvel Comics
- First appearance: Iron Man vol. 4 #1 (Jan. 2005)
- Created by: Warren Ellis; Adi Granov

In-story information
- Species: Human
- Team affiliations: FuturePharm Corporation
- Abilities: Genius-level intellect

Aldrich Killian is a supervillain appearing in American comic books published by Marvel Comics. The character first appeared in Iron Man vol. 4 #1 (Jan. 2005) and was created by Warren Ellis and Adi Granov.

Guy Pearce portrays Killian in the Marvel Cinematic Universe film Iron Man 3 (2013).

== Publication history ==
Created by Warren Ellis and Adi Granov, the character first appeared in Iron Man vol. 4 #1 (Jan. 2005).

== Fictional character biography ==
Aldrich Killian is a scientist working for the FuturePharm Corporation in Austin, Texas alongside Dr. Maya Hansen. Together, Killian and Hansen developed Extremis, a virus that completely rewrites the body's genetic code. Extremis makes entire organs more efficient and gives the subject healing abilities, with superhuman strength, speed, endurance, reflexes and the ability to project electricity and breathe fire. Killian steals a sample of Extremis and sells it to a terrorist group, with Mallen as a willing test subject. Days later, at FuturePharm's offices, Killian commits suicide; his suicide note informs Hansen that he stole the Extremis serum for an undisclosed purpose.

== In other media ==
=== Film ===
Aldrich Killian appears in Iron Man 3, portrayed by Guy Pearce. This version attempted to pitch his think tank, A.I.M., to Tony Stark years prior, but was snubbed by Stark and swore revenge. Over the years, Killian and co-conspirator Maya Hansen used A.I.M. to develop the Extremis virus. Killian mounts terrorist attacks as part of his revenge against Stark until he and his forces are killed by Stark, James Rhodes, and Pepper Potts.

=== Video games ===
- Aldrich Killian appears in Iron Man 3: The Official Game. Following the events of the film, A.I.M. transferred his subconscious into MODOK so he can continue his plans.
- The Iron Man 3 incarnation of Aldrich Killian appears as a boss and unlockable playable character in Lego Marvel Super Heroes and Lego Marvel's Avengers, voiced by Robin Atkin Downes and Greg Miller respectively.
