= Iron Man 2 =

2010 Marvel Studios film

- Theatrical release poster
- Directed by: Jon Favreau
- Screenplay by: Justin Theroux
- Based on: Iron Man by: Stan Lee; Don Heck; Larry Lieber; Jack Kirby
- Produced by: Kevin Feige
- Starring: Robert Downey Jr.; Gwyneth Paltrow; Don Cheadle; Scarlett Johansson; Sam Rockwell; Mickey Rourke; Samuel L. Jackson
- Cinematography: Matthew Libatique
- Edited by: Dan Lebental; Richard Pearson
- Music by: John Debney
- Production company: Marvel Studios
- Distributed by: Paramount Pictures (Note: In July 2013, the film's distribution rights were transferred from Paramount Pictures to Walt Disney Studios Motion Pictures following Disney's acquisition of Marvel Entertainment.)
- Release dates: April 26, 2010 (El Capitan Theatre); May 7, 2010 (United States)
- Running time: 125 minutes
- Country: United States
- Language: English
- Budget: $170 million
- Box office: $623.9 million

Iron Man 2 is a 2010 American superhero film based on the Marvel Comics character Iron Man. Produced by Marvel Studios and distributed by Paramount Pictures, it is the sequel to Iron Man (2008) and the third film in the Marvel Cinematic Universe (MCU). Directed by Jon Favreau and written by Justin Theroux, the film stars Robert Downey Jr. as Tony Stark / Iron Man alongside Gwyneth Paltrow, Don Cheadle, Scarlett Johansson, Sam Rockwell, Mickey Rourke, and Samuel L. Jackson. In the film, Stark rejects government demands to share his Iron Man suit technology, which is slowly killing him. Russian scientist Ivan Vanko (Rourke) creates his own version and plots revenge against the Stark family.

Development on a sequel to Iron Man began in May 2008 after the success of the first film. In July, Theroux was hired to write the script and Favreau was signed to return as director. Downey, Paltrow, and Jackson were set to reprise their roles from Iron Man, while Cheadle was brought in to replace Terrence Howard in the role of James Rhodes. In early 2009, Rourke, Rockwell, and Johansson filled out the supporting cast. Filming took place from April to July 2009, mostly in California as with the first film. A key sequence was filmed in Monaco. Unlike its predecessor, which mixed digital and practical effects, the sequel primarily relied on computer-generated imagery to create the Iron Man suits.

Iron Man 2 premiered at the El Capitan Theatre in Hollywood, Los Angeles, on April 26, 2010, and was released in the United States on May 7 as part of Phase One of the MCU. Critics praised Downey's performance but deemed the sequel to be inferior to the first film. It grossed over $623 million, making it the seventh-highest-grossing film of 2010, and was nominated for Best Visual Effects at the 83rd Academy Awards among other accolades. A sequel, Iron Man 3, was released in 2013.

== Plot ==
In Russia, the media covers Tony Stark's disclosure of his identity as Iron Man. Ivan Vanko, mourning the death of his father Anton Vanko—a former Stark Industries employee, sees this and builds the same miniature arc reactor as Stark's using old Stark Industries blueprints left behind by Anton.

Six months later, (Note: The 2023 book The Marvel Cinematic Universe: An Official Timeline places the film in early 2010, simultaneously with the events of the films The Incredible Hulk (2008) and Thor (2011).) Tony wants to continue the legacy of his father Howard, and re-institutes the Stark Expo in New York City's Flushing Meadows–Corona Park. He also resists pressure to turn over his armored suits to the government and Stark's rival, Justin Hammer. However, Stark learns that the palladium core in the arc reactor that keeps him alive and powers the armor is slowly poisoning him, and he is unable to find a substitute. Growing increasingly despondent about his impending death, and refusing to tell anyone about his condition, Stark appoints his assistant Pepper Potts as CEO of Stark Industries and promotes Stark employee "Natalie Rushman" to replace her as his assistant.

Stark competes in the Monaco Historic Grand Prix, where he is attacked in the middle of the race by Vanko, who wields electrified whips powered by his arc reactor. Stark dons his armor and defeats Vanko, but the armor is severely damaged. Vanko explains that he intended to prove to the world that Iron Man is not invincible. Impressed by Vanko's performance, Hammer fakes Vanko's death while breaking him out of prison and asks him to build a line of armored suits to upstage Stark. Vanko decides that unmanned drones are better to eliminate the human factor.

During his birthday party, Stark gets drunk while wearing the Iron Man suit. Annoyed by Tony's recklessness, Stark's best friend, U.S. Air Force Lieutenant Colonel James Rhodes, dons Stark's prototype armor and tries to restrain him. The fight ends in a stalemate, and Rhodes confiscates the prototype armor for the U.S. Air Force. Nick Fury, director of S.H.I.E.L.D., approaches Stark. Fury reveals that "Rushman" is S.H.I.E.L.D. agent Natasha Romanoff and that Fury personally knew Howard Stark, who was a founder of S.H.I.E.L.D. Fury explains that Vanko's father and Howard invented the arc reactor together, but Howard had Anton deported when the latter tried to sell it. The Soviets then sent Anton to the Gulag. Fury gives Stark some of his father's old material. In a diorama of the 1974 Stark Expo, Stark finds a diagram of the atomic structure of a new element. With the aid of his A.I., J.A.R.V.I.S., Stark determines it can replace his arc reactor's current palladium core, and successfully synthesizes it.

When Stark learns that Vanko is still alive, he goes to Hammer's exhibition at the expo. The armored drones are unveiled, with Rhodes – in a heavily weaponized version of the prototype armor, dubbed "War Machine" – as their leader. Just as Stark arrives to warn Rhodes, Vanko takes remote control of all the drones and Rhodes's armor and attacks Stark. Hammer is arrested for breaking Vanko out of prison while Romanoff and Stark's bodyguard Happy Hogan infiltrate Hammer's factory. Vanko escapes, but Romanoff gains access to Hammer Industries software and returns control of Rhodes's armor to him. Together, Stark and Rhodes defeat Vanko, who dies by suicide via blowing up his suit and the drones.

At a debriefing, Fury informs Stark that because of his difficult personality, S.H.I.E.L.D. intends to use him only as a consultant moving forward. Stark and Rhodes receive medals for their heroism. In a post-credits scene, S.H.I.E.L.D. agent Phil Coulson discovers a large hammer in New Mexico. (Note: This scene was directed by Kenneth Branagh during production on the film Thor (2011).)

== Cast ==
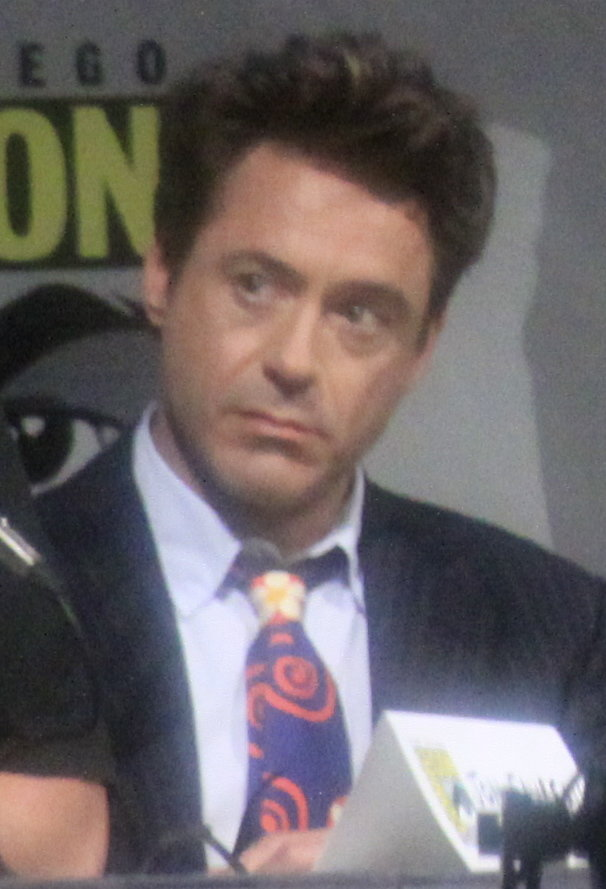
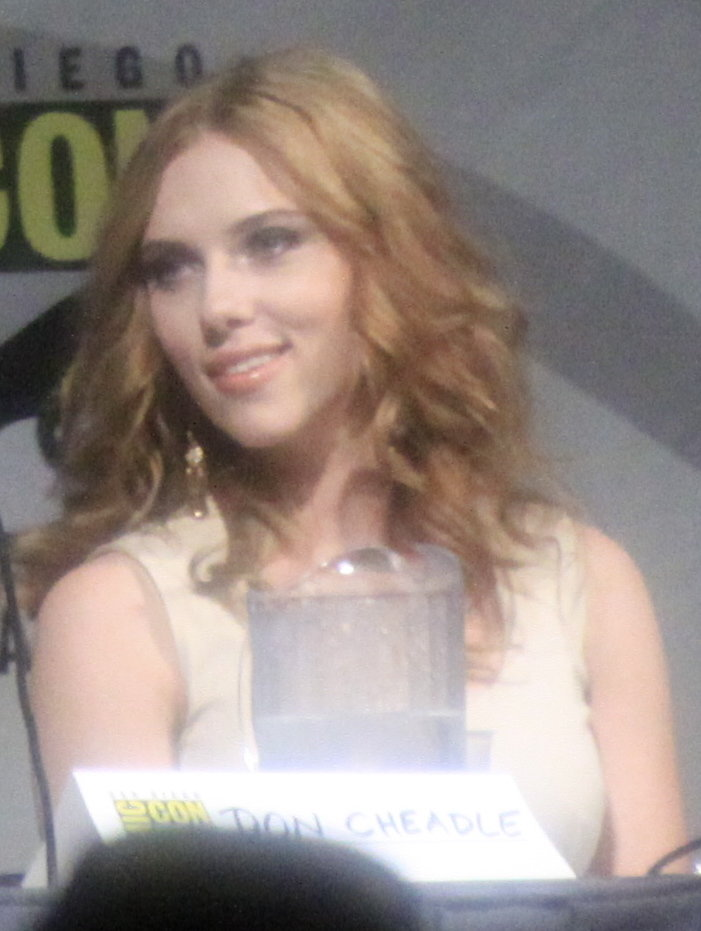
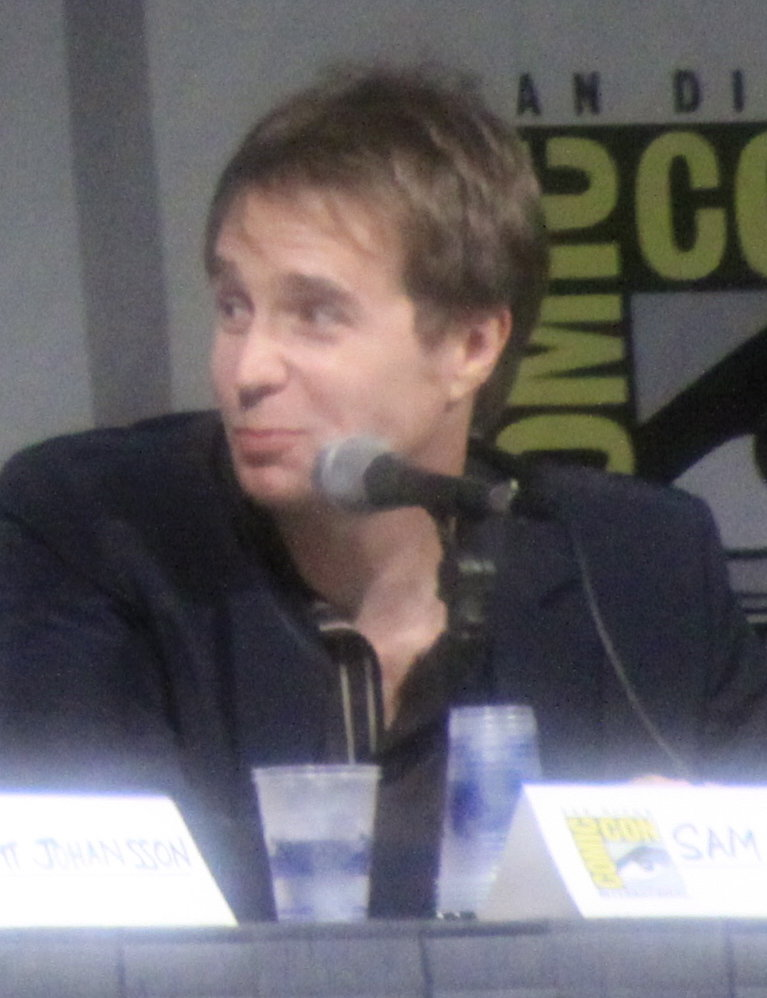
Downey, Johansson and Rockwell promoting the film at the 2009 San Diego Comic-Con
- Robert Downey Jr. as Tony Stark / Iron Man:
  A billionaire who escaped captivity in Afghanistan with a suit of armor he created, he now struggles to keep his technology out of the government's hands. Downey and Favreau, who had been handed a script and worked from it on the first movie, conceived part of the film's story themselves. On Stark being a hero, Downey said, "It's kind of heroic, but really kind of on his own behalf. So I think there's probably a bit of an imposter complex and no sooner has he said, 'I am Iron Man–' that he's now really wondering what that means. If you have all this cushion like he does and the public is on your side and you have immense wealth and power, I think he's way too insulated to be okay." Downey put on 20 pounds of muscle to reprise the role. Six-year-old Davin Ransom portrays Tony Stark as a child.
- Gwyneth Paltrow as Pepper Potts:
  Stark's closest friend, budding love interest, and business partner; Pepper is promoted to CEO of Stark Industries. On her character's promotion, Paltrow opined, "When we start Iron Man 2 Pepper and Tony are very much in the same vibe... as the movie progresses, Pepper is given more responsibility and she's promoted and it's nice to see her sort of grow up in that way. I think it really suits her, the job fits her really well." Paltrow expressed excitement about working with Johansson.
- Don Cheadle as James "Rhodey" Rhodes / War Machine:
  An officer in the U.S. Air Force and Tony Stark's close personal friend who later operates the War Machine armor. Cheadle replaces Terrence Howard from the first film. Cheadle had only a few hours to accept the role and did not even know what storyline Rhodes would undergo. He commented that he is a comic book fan, but had not previously participated in comics-themed films due to the scarcity of black superheroes. Cheadle said he thought Iron Man was a robot before the first film came out. On how he approached his character, Cheadle stated, "I go, what's the common denominator here? And the common denominator was really his friendship with Tony, and that's what we really tried to track in this one. How is their friendship impacted once Tony comes out and owns 'I am Iron Man'?". Cheadle said his suit was 23 kilograms (50 lb) of metal, and that he could not touch his face while wearing it. Cheadle signed a six-picture deal.
- Scarlett Johansson as Natasha Romanoff / Black Widow:
  An undercover spy for S.H.I.E.L.D. posing as Stark's new assistant. Johansson dyed her hair red before she landed the part, hoping that it would help convince Favreau that she was right for the role. On why she chose the role, Johansson said, "the Black Widow character resonated with me... [She] is a superhero, but she's also human. She's small, but she's strong... She is dark and has faced death so many times that she has a deep perspective on the value of life... It's hard not to admire her." She stated that she had "a bit of a freak-out moment" when she first saw the cat-suit and worked closely with the stunt team to learn how to fight in it in order to "sell it". During promotion for Black Widow (2021), Johansson said the character was hyper-sexualized in Iron Man 2, specifically referring to dialogue that described her as "a piece of something, like a possession", but at the time she felt this was "like a compliment". Though she was grateful to have been a part of the film, she was more grateful that the character's portrayal had evolved to convey a more positive message by the time of Black Widow.
- Sam Rockwell as Justin Hammer:
  A rival weapons manufacturer. Sam Rockwell was considered for the role of Tony Stark in the first film, and he accepted the role of Hammer without reading the script. He had never heard of the character before he was contacted about the part, and was unaware Hammer is an old Englishman in the comics. Rockwell said, "I worked with Jon Favreau on this film called Made (2001). And Justin Theroux, who wrote the script, is an old friend of mine, they sort of cooked up this idea and pitched it to Kevin Feige. What they did, they were maybe going to do one villain like they did with Jeff Bridges, but then they decided to split the villains. And really Mickey [Rourke] is the main [villain], but I come to his aid." Rockwell described his character as "plucky comic relief, but he's got a little bit of an edge".
- Mickey Rourke as Ivan Vanko / Whiplash:
  A Russian physicist and ex-convict who builds a pair of arc reactor-based electric whips to exact vengeance on the Stark family. The character is an amalgamation of Whiplash and Crimson Dynamo. Rourke visited Butyrka prison to research the role, and he suggested that half of the character's dialogue be in Russian. He also suggested the addition of tattoos, gold teeth and a fondness for a pet cockatoo, paying for the teeth and bird with his own money. One of Rourke's tattoos read "Loki", the name of one of his dogs that had died prior to filming, which Feige requested be digitally removed as it felt it would lead to confusion regarding the comics character Loki, who was set to appear in Thor (2011). Rourke explained that he did not want to play a "one-dimensional bad guy", and wanted to challenge the audience to see something redeemable in him. Not knowing anything about computers, Rourke described pretending to be tech-savvy as the hardest part of the role.
- Samuel L. Jackson as Nick Fury:
  Director of S.H.I.E.L.D.; Jackson signed a nine-film contract to play the character. On the subject of his character not seeing any action in the film, Jackson said, "We still haven't moved Nick Fury into the bad-ass zone. He's still just kind of a talker."

The director, Jon Favreau, reprises his role as Happy Hogan, Tony Stark's bodyguard and chauffeur, while Clark Gregg and Leslie Bibb reprise their roles as S.H.I.E.L.D. agent Phil Coulson and reporter Christine Everhart, respectively. John Slattery appears as Tony's father Howard Stark and Garry Shandling appears as United States Senator Stern, who wants Stark to give Iron Man's armor to the government. Favreau stated that Shandling's character was named after radio personality Howard Stern. Paul Bettany again voices Stark's computer, J.A.R.V.I.S. Olivia Munn originally appeared as an unnamed character who was subsequently cut from the film. Favreau then gave her the role of Chess Roberts, a reporter covering the Stark expo. Yevgeni Lazarev appears as Ivan Vanko's father, Anton Vanko, Kate Mara portrays a process server who summons Tony to the government hearing, and Stan Lee appears as himself (but is mistaken for Larry King).

Additionally, news anchor Christiane Amanpour, political commentator Bill O'Reilly, Tesla Motors CEO Elon Musk, and Oracle Corporation CEO Larry Ellison appear as themselves. Adam Goldstein, who also appears as himself, died before the film's release; the film is dedicated to his memory. Favreau's son Max appears as a child wearing an Iron Man mask whom Stark saves from a drone. In 2017, Spider-Man: Homecoming director Jon Watts said that he had suggested to Feige that they retroactively establish this child to be the introduction of a young Peter Parker / Spider-Man to the MCU, an idea that Feige agreed was plausible, and which then-Spider-Man actor Tom Holland also supported.

== Production ==
=== Development ===
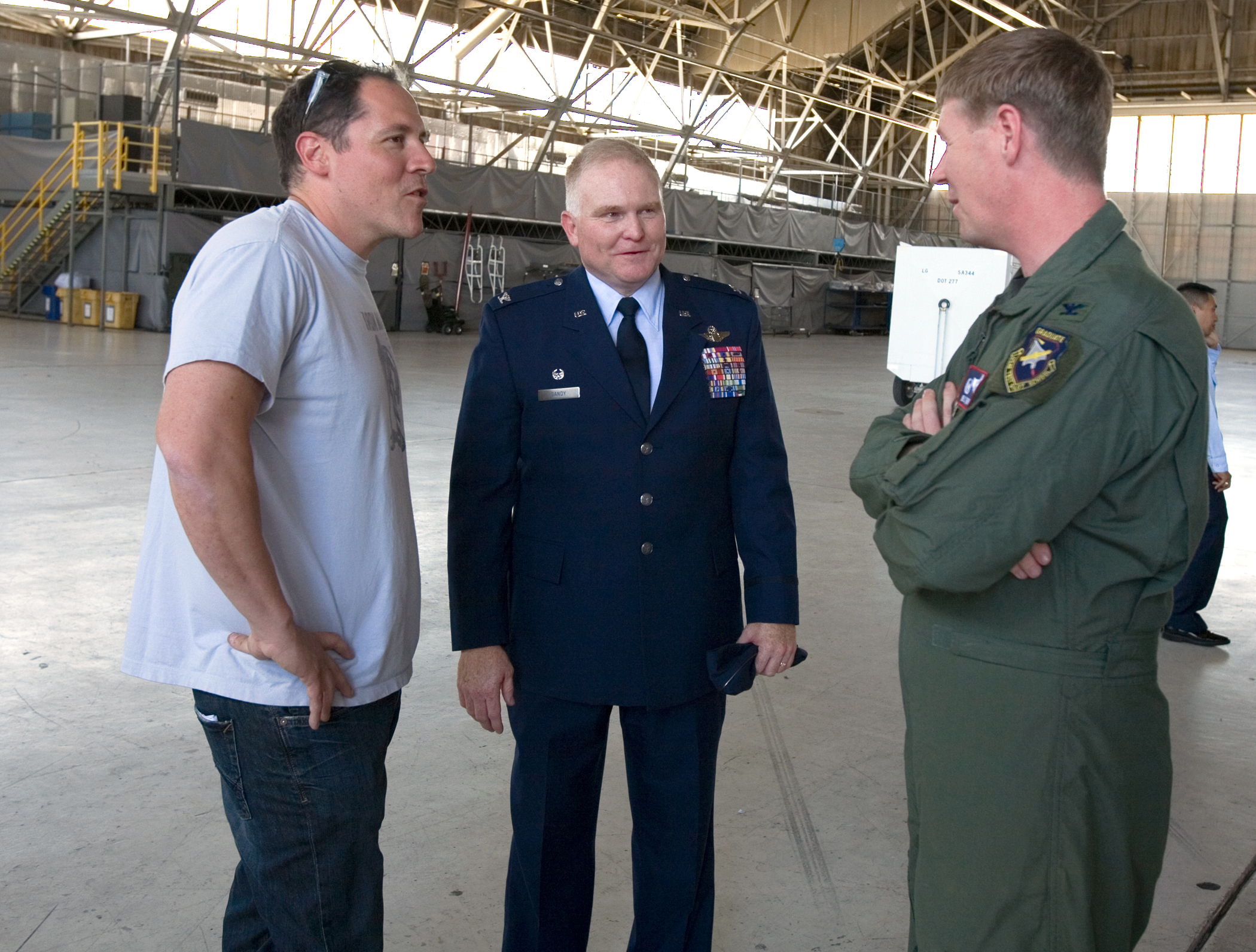
Jon Favreau meeting with members of the U.S. Air Force while filming at Edwards Air Force Base

Jon Favreau said it was originally his intent to create a film trilogy for Iron Man, with Obadiah Stane (Jeff Bridges) becoming Iron Monger during the sequels. After a meeting between Favreau and various comic book writers, including Mark Millar, Stane became the main villain in Iron Man. Millar argued that the Mandarin, whom Favreau originally intended to fill that role, was too fantastical. Favreau concurred, deciding, "I look at Mandarin more like how in Star Wars you had the Emperor, but Darth Vader is the guy you want to see fight. Then you work your way to the time when lightning bolts are shooting out of the fingers and all that stuff could happen. But you can't have what happened in Return of the Jedi (1983) happen in A New Hope (1977). You just can't do it". Favreau also discussed in interviews how the films' version of Mandarin "allows us to incorporate the whole pantheon of villains". He mentioned that S.H.I.E.L.D. would continue to have a major role.

During development, Favreau said the film would explore Stark's alcoholism, but it would not be "the 'Demon in a Bottle' version". While promoting the first film, Downey stated that Stark would probably develop a drinking problem as he is unable to cope with his age, the effects of revealing he is Iron Man, and Pepper getting a boyfriend. Downey later clarified that the film was not a strict adaptation of the "Demon in a Bottle" storyline from the comic book series, but was instead about the "interim space" between the origin and the "Demon" story arc. The storyline was ultimately downplayed for the film, as studio executives were concerned with how an alcoholic Iron Man would be perceived in marketing and affect merchandise sales. Shane Black gave some advice on the script, and suggested to Favreau and Downey that they model Stark on J. Robert Oppenheimer, who became depressed with being "the destroyer of worlds" after working on the Manhattan Project. An early version for the film's story involved Justin Hammer creating different villains in addition to Whiplash, like Ghost, but the idea was discarded. Ghost debuted in the MCU years later in Ant-Man and the Wasp (2018).

=== Pre-production ===
After the commercial success of Iron Man in May 2008, Marvel Studios began developing a sequel, with an intended release date of April 30, 2010. That July, Favreau signed on to direct following several months of negotiating, while Justin Theroux signed to write the script, which would be based on a story written by Favreau and Downey. Theroux co-wrote Tropic Thunder (2008), which Downey had starred in, and Downey recommended him to Marvel. Genndy Tartakovsky storyboarded the film, and Adi Granov returned to supervise the designs for Iron Man's armor.

In October 2008, Marvel Studios came to an agreement to film Iron Man 2, as well as their next three films, at Raleigh Studios in Manhattan Beach, California. A few days later, Don Cheadle was hired to replace Terrence Howard. On being replaced, Howard stated, "There was no explanation, apparently the contracts that we write and sign aren't worth the paper that they're printed on sometimes. Promises aren't kept, and good-faith negotiations aren't always held up." Entertainment Weekly stated Favreau did not enjoy working with Howard, often re-shooting and cutting his scenes; Howard's publicist said he had a good experience playing the part, while Marvel chose not to comment. As Favreau and Theroux chose to reduce the role, Marvel came to Howard to discuss lowering his salary—Howard was the first actor hired in Iron Man and was paid the largest salary. The publication stated they were unsure whether Howard's representatives left the project first or if Marvel chose to stop negotiating. Theroux denied the part of the report which claimed the size of the role had fluctuated. In November 2013, Howard stated that, going into the film, the studio offered him far less than was in his three-picture contract, claiming they told him the second will be successful, "with or without you," and, without mentioning him by name, said Downey "took the money that was supposed to go to me and pushed me out."

In January 2009, Rourke and Rockwell entered negotiations to play a pair of villains. A few days later, Rockwell confirmed he would take the role, and that his character would be Justin Hammer. Paul Bettany confirmed that he would be returning to voice J.A.R.V.I.S. Marvel entered into early talks with Emily Blunt to play the Black Widow, though she was unable to take the role due to a previous commitment to star in Gulliver's Travels (2010). Samuel L. Jackson confirmed that he had been in discussions to reprise the role of Nick Fury from the first film's post-credits scene, but that contract disputes were making a deal difficult. Jackson stated, "There was a huge kind of negotiation that broke down. I don't know. Maybe I won't be Nick Fury."

In February, Jackson and Marvel came to terms, and he was signed to play the character in up to nine films. Downey and Rourke discussed his part during a roundtable discussion with David Ansen at the 2009 Golden Globes, and Rourke met with Favreau and Theroux to discuss the role. Rourke almost dropped out because of Marvel's initial salary offer of $250,000, but the studio raised the offer, and in March, Rourke signed on. Later that same day, Scarlett Johansson signed on to play the Black Widow. Her deal included options for multiple films, including potentially The Avengers. Prior to her casting, Johansson had also researched other Marvel characters she could play, including the Blonde Phantom and the Wasp. In April, Garry Shandling, Clark Gregg, and Kate Mara joined the cast.

=== Filming ===
"This is one of the richest men in the world, so we can't buy our practicals from Home Depot. Everything had to be intelligent technology, and it had to look classic enough to have some shelf life – we didn't want it to look embarrassingly dated 10 years from now."

— Matthew Libatique, the film's cinematographer

Principal photography began April 6, 2009, at the Pasadena Masonic Temple, with the working title Rasputin. The bulk of the production took place at Raleigh Studios, though other locations were also used. Scenes were filmed at Edwards Air Force Base from May 11 through May 13. The location had also been used for Iron Man, and Favreau stated that he felt the "real military assets make the movie more authentic and the topography and the beauty of the desert and flightline open the movie up". The Historic Grand Prix of Monaco action sequence was shot in the parking lot of Downey Studios, with sets constructed in May and filming lasting through June. Permission to film in Monaco prior to the 2009 Monaco Grand Prix had initially been awarded, but was later retracted by Bernie Ecclestone. The filmmakers shipped one Rolls-Royce Phantom there and filmed a track sequence in which race cars were later digitally added. Tanner Foust took on the role of driving Stark's racing car. Also in June, it was reported that John Slattery had joined the film's cast as Howard Stark. Olivia Munn was also cast, in an unspecified role.

A massive green screen was constructed at the Sepulveda Dam to film a portion of the Stark Expo exterior, with the rest either shot at an area high school or added digitally. To construct the green screen, hundreds of shipping containers were stacked, covered in plywood and plaster, and then painted green. For the conclusion of that climactic scene, which the crew dubbed the "Japanese Garden" scene, a set was built inside Sony Studios in Los Angeles. Filming lasted 71 days, and the film's production officially wrapped on July 18, 2009. A post-credits scene depicting the discovery of a large hammer was filmed on the set of Thor (2011), and some of it was reused in the film. Jon Favreau revealed that the scene was filmed with anamorphic lenses to match Thor, and was directed by Kenneth Branagh, the director of Thor.

A large amount of improvisation was done on set during filming, notably from Downey, which necessitated Theroux to do "writing gymnastics" to create a cohesive narrative around the various ad-libs; this process caused Theroux's back to give out and become bedridden because of the stress and toll it took on him. The film's story eventually strayed from the intended adaptation of the "Demon in the Bottle" storyline. Speaking to the "Demon in the Bottle" elements in the film, Theroux noted how Stark is shown drinking and out of control, becoming a "self-destructive ticking clock", stating that his palladium illness served as a substitute metaphor for "a man who's running out of steam and needs his friends to step up". Additionally, the creatives did not want the film to become like Leaving Las Vegas (1995) had they faithfully adapted the storyline.

=== Post-production ===
In December 2009, the Walt Disney Company purchased Marvel Entertainment for $4 billion. Disney said future Marvel Studios films would be distributed by its own studio once the prior deal with Paramount expired. This meant the rest of production, marketing, and distribution for Iron Man 2 were all handled by Paramount. In January 2010, IMAX Corporation, Marvel, and Paramount announced that the film would receive a limited release on digital IMAX screens. It was not shot with IMAX cameras, so it was converted into the format using the IMAX DMR technology. The film underwent reshoots in February. Olivia Munn's original role was cut, but she was given a new role during the reshoots.

Robert Downey Jr. and Don Cheadle in their suits, before and after ILM's CGI enhancements

Janek Sirrs was the film's visual effects supervisor, and Industrial Light & Magic did the majority of the effects, as it did on the first film. ILM's visual effects supervisor on the film, Ben Snow, said their work on the film was "harder" than their work on the first, stating that Favreau asked more of them this time around. Snow described the process of digitally creating the suits:

On the first Iron Man, we tried to use the Legacy [Studios, Stan Winston's effects company] and Stan Winston suits as much as we could. For the second one, Jon [Favreau] was confident we could create the CG suits, and the action dictated using them. So, Legacy created what we called the "football suits" from the torso up with a chest plate and helmet. We'd usually put in some arm pieces, but not the whole arm. In the house fight sequence, where Robert Downey Jr. staggers around tipsy, we used some of the practical suit and extended it digitally. Same thing in the Randy's Donuts scene. But in the rest of the film, we used the CG suit entirely. And Double Negative did an all-digital suit for the Monaco chase.

ILM created 527 shots for the film, using programs such as Maya. Perception worked on over 125 shots for the film. They crafted gadgets, such as Tony Stark's transparent LG smartphone, and created the backdrops for the Stark Expo as well as the computer screen interfaces on the touch-screen coffee table and the holographic lab environment. In total, 11 visual effect studios worked on the film.

== Music ==
A soundtrack album featuring AC/DC was released by Columbia Records on April 19, 2010, in at least three different versions: basic, special and deluxe. The basic edition includes the CD; the special edition contains a 15-track CD, a 32-page booklet and a DVD featuring interviews, behind-the-scenes footage, and music videos; and the deluxe includes a reproduction of one of Iron Man's first comic book appearances. Only 2 songs on the soundtrack actually appear in the movie. Although not included on the soundtrack album the film includes songs by The Average White Band, The Clash, Queen, Daft Punk, 2Pac and Beastie Boys.

The film score was released commercially as Iron Man 2: Original Motion Picture Score on July 20, 2010, featuring 25 tracks. John Debney composed the score with Tom Morello, with composer Richard M. Sherman of the Sherman Brothers contributing the Stark Expo theme song, "Make Way for Tomorrow Today".

== Marketing ==
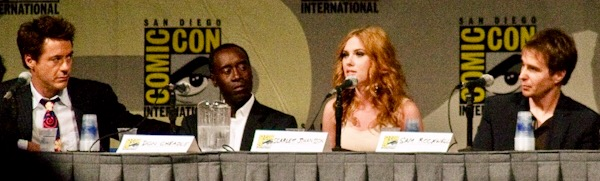
The cast of Iron Man 2 at the 2009 San Diego Comic-Con

At the 2009 San Diego Comic-Con, a five-minute trailer for the movie was shown. Actors portraying Stark Industries recruiters handed out business cards with an invitation to apply. A website for Stark Industries went online, with an attached graphic of a "napkin memo" from Stark to Potts announcing that Stark Industries no longer made weapons. Another section featured an online application. It was confirmed that the first theatrical trailer would premiere in front of Sherlock Holmes (another Robert Downey Jr. film). This trailer was released online on December 16, 2009. A new trailer was shown by Robert Downey Jr. on Jimmy Kimmel Live! on March 7 after the Academy Awards. Promotional partners included Symantec, Dr Pepper, Burger King, 7-Eleven, Audi, LG Electronics and Hershey.

Author Alexander C. Irvine adapted the script into a novel, also titled Iron Man 2, that was released in April 2010. Prior to the film release, Marvel Comics released a four-issue miniseries comic book titled Iron Man vs Whiplash, which introduced the film's version of Whiplash into the Marvel Universe. A three-issue prequel miniseries titled Iron Man 2: Public Identity was released in April.

An Iron Man 2 video game was released by Sega on May 4, 2010, in North America, written by The Invincible Iron Man scribe Matt Fraction. The Wii version was developed by High Voltage Software and all console versions were published by Sega, while Gameloft published the mobile game. The game's Comic-Con trailer showed that the Crimson Dynamo was set to appear as a villain. Cheadle and Jackson voice their respective characters in the games. The trailer revealed that A.I.M, Roxxon Energy Corporation, and Ultimo (depicted as a man named Kearson DeWitt in a large armor suit) are enemies in the game as well as revealing that the wearer of the Crimson Dynamo armor is General Valentin Shatalov. The game received "generally unfavorable" reviews, with a Metacritic score of 41% for both the PS3 and Xbox 360 versions.

== Release ==
=== Theatrical ===
Iron Man 2 premiered at the El Capitan Theatre in Hollywood, Los Angeles, on April 26, 2010. It was released in 6,764 theaters, including 48 IMAX theaters, across 54 countries between April 28 and May 7, before going into general release in the United States on May 7, 2010. In the United States, it opened in 4,380 theaters, 181 of which were IMAX. The international release date of the film was moved forward to increase interest ahead of the 2010 FIFA World Cup. Iron Man 2 is part of Phase One of the MCU.

=== Home media ===
On September 28, 2010, the film was released by Paramount Home Entertainment on DVD and Blu-ray. The film was also collected in a 10-disc box set titled "Marvel Cinematic Universe: Phase One – Avengers Assembled", which includes all of the Phase One films in the Marvel Cinematic Universe. It was released by Walt Disney Studios Home Entertainment on April 2, 2013.

== Reception ==
=== Box office ===
Iron Man 2 grossed $312.4 million in the United States and Canada, and $311.5 million in other territories, for a worldwide total of $623.9 million. It cost around $170 million to produce and around $150 million for marketing. Paramount Pictures collected 8% of the box office revenue while the remaining portion went to Disney.

Iron Man 2 earned $51 million on its opening day in the United States and Canada (including $7.5 million from Thursday previews), for a total weekend gross of $128 million, which was the fifth-highest opening weekend ever, at the time, behind The Dark Knight, Spider-Man 3, The Twilight Saga: New Moon, and Pirates of the Caribbean: Dead Man's Chest. It also had the highest opening for a 2010 movie and Paramount's highest opening weekend. The film yielded an average of $29,252 per theater. IMAX contributed $9.8 million, which was the highest opening weekend for a 2D IMAX film, surpassing Star Trek's previous record of $8.5 million. Iron Man 2 is the third-highest-grossing film of 2010 in the United States and Canada, behind Toy Story 3 and Alice in Wonderland.

Iron Man 2 launched in six European markets with number-one openings on Wednesday, April 28, 2010, for a total of $2.2 million. It earned $100.2 million its first five days from 53 foreign markets, for a strong average of $14,814 per site. IMAX Corporation reported grosses of $2.25 million, surpassing the previous record-holder for an IMAX 2D release, 2009's Transformers: Revenge of the Fallen ($2.1 million). It was the seventh-highest-grossing film of 2010 internationally, behind Toy Story 3, Alice in Wonderland, Harry Potter and the Deathly Hallows – Part 1, Inception, Shrek Forever After, and The Twilight Saga: Eclipse.

=== Critical response ===
On review aggregator Rotten Tomatoes, 72% of 299 critics gave Iron Man 2 a positive review, with an average score of 6.6/10. The critics consensus reads, "It isn't quite the breath of fresh air that Iron Man was, but this sequel comes close with solid performances and an action-packed plot." Metacritic, which uses a weighted average, assigned the film a score of 57 out of 100 based on 40 critics, indicating "mixed or average" reviews. Critics praised Downey's performance but deemed the sequel to be inferior to the first film. Audiences polled by CinemaScore gave the film an average grade of "A" on a scale of A+ to F, the same score as Iron Man.

Brian Lowry of Variety stated, "Iron Man 2 isn't as much fun as its predecessor, but by the time the smoke clears, it'll do". Anthony Lane of The New Yorker said, "To find a comic-book hero who doesn't agonize over his supergifts, and would defend his constitutional right to get a kick out of them, is frankly a relief". David Edelstein of New York Magazine wrote, "It doesn't come close to the emotional heft of those two rare 2s that outclassed their ones: Superman II and Spider-Man 2. But Iron Man 2 hums along quite nicely". Roger Ebert gave it 3 stars out of 4, stating, "Iron Man 2 is a polished, high-octane sequel, not as good as the original but building once again on a quirky performance by Robert Downey Jr". Frank Lovece of Film Journal International, a one-time Marvel Comics writer, said, "In a refreshing and unexpected turn, the sequel to Iron Man doesn't find a changed man. Inside the metal, imperfect humanity grows even more so, as thought-provoking questions of identity meet techno-fantasy made flesh."

Conversely, Kirk Honeycutt of The Hollywood Reporter stated, "Everything fun and terrific about Iron Man, a mere two years ago, has vanished with its sequel. In its place, Iron Man 2 has substituted noise, confusion, multiple villains, irrelevant stunts and misguided story lines."

=== Accolades ===
Accolades received by Iron Man 2
Award	Date of ceremony	Category	Recipient(s)	Result	Ref.
Academy Awards	February 27, 2011	Best Visual Effects	Janek Sirrs, Ben Snow, Ged Wright, and Dan Sudick	Nominated	
American Music Awards	November 21, 2010	Favorite Soundtrack	Iron Man 2	Nominated	
BET Awards	June 26, 2011	Best Actor	Don Cheadle	Nominated	
Golden Reel Awards	February 20, 2011	Best Sound Editing in Feature Film – Sound Effects & Foley	Frank E. Eulner, Christopher Boyes, James Likowski, Dennie Thorpe, Jana Vance, Ken Fischer, J.R. Grubbs, Scott Guitteau, Kyrsten Mate, Andrea Gard, Luke Dunn Gielmuda, and Robert Shoup	Nominated	
Hollywood Film Awards	October 25, 2010	Hollywood Visual Effects Award	Ben Snow and Janek Sirrs	Won	
Hollywood Post Alliance Awards	November 6, 2008	Outstanding Compositing – Feature Film	Jon Alexander, Patrick Brennan, Amy Shepard, and Jason Porter	Nominated	
MTV Movie Awards	June 5, 2011	Best Villain	Mickey Rourke	Nominated	
Nickelodeon Kids' Choice Awards	April 2, 2011	Favorite Buttkicker	Robert Downey Jr.	Nominated	
People's Choice Awards	January 5, 2011	Favorite Movie	Iron Man 2	Nominated	
People's Choice Awards	January 5, 2011	Favorite Action Movie	Iron Man 2	Won	
People's Choice Awards	January 5, 2011	Favorite Movie Actor	Robert Downey Jr.	Nominated	
People's Choice Awards	January 5, 2011	Favorite Action Star	Robert Downey Jr.	Nominated	
People's Choice Awards	January 5, 2011	Favorite On-Screen Team	Robert Downey Jr. and Don Cheadle	Nominated	
Satellite Awards	December 19, 2010	Best Sound	Christopher Boyes, Frank E. Eulner, and Lora Hirschberg	Nominated	
Satellite Awards	December 19, 2010	Best Visual Effects	Janek Sirrs, Ben Snow, and Ged Wright	Nominated	
Saturn Awards	June 23, 2011	Best Science Fiction Film	Iron Man 2	Nominated	
Saturn Awards	June 23, 2011	Best Actor	Robert Downey Jr.	Nominated	
Saturn Awards	June 23, 2011	Best Supporting Actress	Scarlett Johansson	Nominated	
Saturn Awards	June 23, 2011	Best Special Effects	Iron Man 2	Nominated	
Scream Awards	October 16, 2010	Ultimate Scream	Iron Man 2	Nominated	
Scream Awards	October 16, 2010	Best Science Fiction Movie	Iron Man 2	Nominated	
Scream Awards	October 16, 2010	Best Science Fiction Actress	Scarlett Johansson	Won	
Scream Awards	October 16, 2010	Best Science Fiction Actress	Gwyneth Paltrow	Nominated	
Scream Awards	October 16, 2010	Best Science Fiction Actor	Robert Downey Jr.	Nominated	
Scream Awards	October 16, 2010	Best Villain	Mickey Rourke	Won	
Scream Awards	October 16, 2010	Best Superhero	Robert Downey Jr.	Won	
Scream Awards	October 16, 2010	Best Supporting Actor	Don Cheadle	Nominated	
Scream Awards	October 16, 2010	Best Cameo	Stan Lee	Nominated	
Scream Awards	October 16, 2010	Best Ensemble	Iron Man 2	Nominated	
Scream Awards	October 16, 2010	Fight Scene of the Year	Final Battle: Iron Man and War Machine vs Whiplash and the Drones	Nominated	
Scream Awards	October 16, 2010	Best F/X	Iron Man 2	Nominated	
Scream Awards	October 16, 2010	Best Comic Book Movie	Iron Man 2	Nominated	
Teen Choice Awards	August 8, 2010	Choice Movie: Sci-Fi	Iron Man	Nominated	
Teen Choice Awards	August 8, 2010	Choice Movie Actor: Sci-Fi	Robert Downey Jr.	Nominated	
Teen Choice Awards	August 8, 2010	Choice Movie Actress: Sci-Fi	Scarlett Johansson	Nominated	
Teen Choice Awards	August 8, 2010	Choice Movie Actress: Sci-Fi	Gwyneth Paltrow	Nominated	
Teen Choice Awards	August 8, 2010	Choice Movie: Villain	Mickey Rourke	Nominated	
Teen Choice Awards	August 8, 2010	Choice Movie: Dance	Robert Downey Jr.	Nominated	
Teen Choice Awards	August 8, 2010	Choice Movie: Fight	Robert Downey Jr. and Don Cheadle vs. the Hammer Drones	Nominated	
Visual Effects Society Awards	February 1, 2011	Outstanding Visual Effects in a Visual Effects-Driven Feature Motion Picture	Ben Snow, Ged Wright, Janek Sirrs, and Susan Pickett	Nominated	
Visual Effects Society Awards	February 1, 2011	Outstanding Models in a Feature Motion Picture	Bruce Holcomb, Ron Woodall, John Goodson, and John Walker (for Hammer Military Drones)	Nominated	
Visual Effects Society Awards	February 1, 2011	Outstanding Created Environment in a Feature Motion Picture	Giles Hancock, Richard Bluff, Todd Vaziri, and Aaron McBride (for Stark Expo)	Nominated	

== Sequel ==
Iron Man 3 was released on May 3, 2013, by Disney following the company's acquisition of Marvel. Favreau opted not to direct the film but still reprised his role as Happy Hogan. Downey, Paltrow, and Cheadle also returned, with Shane Black taking over as director, from a screenplay by Drew Pearce. Also starring are Guy Pearce as Aldrich Killian and Ben Kingsley as Trevor Slattery, an actor who poses as the Mandarin.

== See also ==
- "What If... the World Lost Its Mightiest Heroes?", an episode of the MCU television series What If...? that reimagines some events of this film
- List of films featuring powered exoskeletons
- 3D human–computer interaction
