= Tony Stark (Marvel Cinematic Universe) =

Character in the Marvel Cinematic Universe

- Marvel Cinematic Universe character
- Robert Downey Jr. as Tony Stark in Avengers: Infinity War (2018)
- First appearance: Iron Man (2008)
- Last appearance: Avengers: Endgame (2019)
- Based on: Iron Man by: Stan Lee; Larry Lieber; Don Heck; Jack Kirby
- Adapted by: Mark Fergus Hawk Ostby; Art Marcum Matt Holloway
- Portrayed by: Robert Downey Jr.; Davin Ransom (young)
- Voiced by: Mick Wingert (Disney+ animated shows)

In-universe information
- Full name: Anthony Edward Stark
- Alias: Iron Man
- Occupation: Inventor; Industrialist; Benefactor and leader of the Avengers; Founder of the Maria Stark Foundation/September Foundation/Stark Relief Foundation; Co-founder of the Department of Damage Control; Consultant for the S.H.I.E.L.D.; CEO and Chairman of Stark Industries; Student of Massachusetts Institute of Technology; Student of Phillips Academy
- Affiliation: Avengers; Damage Control; S.H.I.E.L.D.; Stark Industries
- Weapon: Iron Man armor; Arc reactor; Hulkbuster armor; E.D.I.T.H. glasses
- Family: Howard Stark (father); Maria Stark (mother)
- Spouse: Pepper Potts
- Children: Morgan Stark (daughter)
- Origin: Manhattan, New York, United States
- Nationality: American
- Abilities: Genius-level intellect; Proficient scientist and engineer; Powered armor suit granting: Superhuman strength, speed, durability, agility, reflexes, and senses; Energy repulsor and missile projection; Regenerative life support; Supersonic flight

Anthony Edward Stark is a fictional character primarily portrayed by Robert Downey Jr. in the Marvel Cinematic Universe (MCU) media franchise—based on the Marvel Comics character of the same name—commonly known by his alias, Iron Man. Stark is initially depicted as an industrialist, genius inventor, and former playboy who is CEO of Stark Industries. Initially the chief weapons manufacturer for the U.S. military, he has a change of heart and redirects his technical knowledge into creating mechanized suits of armor, which he uses to defend Earth.

Stark becomes a founding member and eventual leader of the Avengers. Following his failed Ultron Program, the internal conflict within the Avengers due to the Sokovia Accords, and Thanos successfully erasing half of all life in the Blip, Stark retires, marries Pepper Potts, and they have a daughter named Morgan. However, Stark rejoins the Avengers on a final mission to undo Thanos' actions. He engineers a time travel device, and the Avengers successfully restore trillions of lives across the universe before Stark ultimately sacrifices his life to defeat Thanos and his army. He chooses Peter Parker as his successor.

Stark is one of the central figures of the MCU, having appeared in ten films. The character and Downey's performance have been credited with helping to cement the MCU as a multi-billion-dollar franchise, with Stark's evolution often considered the defining arc of the series. Alternate versions of Stark from within the MCU multiverse appears in various Disney+ animated series, voiced by Mick Wingert.

== Fictional character biography ==
=== Early life ===
Anthony Edward Stark (Tony) was born on May 29, 1970, in Manhattan, New York to Howard Stark, a famous genius inventor and businessman, and Maria Stark, a socialite and philanthropist. Growing up under the eye of family butler Edwin Jarvis, his life was characterized by a cold and affectionless relationship with his father. Seeing that his son could achieve great things, Howard tried to inspire him with constant talks about his own role in the creation of Captain America. This instead embittered Stark, who felt that his father was taking more pride in his creations than in his family. A brilliant and unique child prodigy, Stark attended the prestigious Phillips Academy in Andover before entering MIT at age 14 and graduating summa cum laude at 17.

On December 16, 1991, when Stark was 21, his parents went away to the Bahamas, but planned to stop at the Pentagon to deliver Super Soldier Serum Howard had redeveloped. Instead, both were killed in a car accident—later revealed to be an assassination carried out by the Winter Soldier, who was mind-controlled by Hydra to steal the serum. (Note: As depicted in Captain America: Civil War (2016)) As a result, Stark inherited his father's company, becoming CEO of Stark Industries. Over the years, he became well known as a weapons designer and inventor, and lived a playboy lifestyle. At a New Year's Eve party for the new millennium, he attended a conference in Bern where he met scientists Maya Hansen, inventor of the Extremis experimental regenerative treatment, and Aldrich Killian, rejecting an offer to work for Killian's Advanced Idea Mechanics. (Note: As depicted in Iron Man 3 (2013))

=== Becoming Iron Man ===
In 2010, Stark travels to war-torn Afghanistan with his friend and military liaison Lieutenant Colonel James Rhodes to demonstrate Stark's new "Jericho" missile. After the demonstration, the convoy is ambushed and Stark is critically wounded and imprisoned by a terrorist group, the Ten Rings. Fellow captive Ho Yinsen, a doctor, implants an electromagnet into Stark's chest to keep shrapnel shards from reaching his heart and killing him.

Stark and Yinsen secretly build a small, powerful electric generator called an arc reactor to power Stark's electromagnet and a suit of powered armor. When the Ten Rings discover the pair's treachery, they attack the workshop and Yinsen sacrifices himself to buy time while the suit is powered. The armored Stark battles his way out of the cave and finds Yinsen, dying shortly thereafter. Engraged, Stark then destroys the Ten Rings' weapons and flies away, crashing in the desert some distance away. Rescued by Rhodes, Stark returns home to announce that his company will no longer manufacture weapons. In his home workshop, Stark builds a sleeker, more powerful version of his improvised armor suit as well as a more powerful arc reactor.

Stark learns that Obadiah Stane has been engaged in arms trafficking to criminals worldwide, and is staging a coup to replace him as Stark Industries' CEO. Stark, in his new armor, flies to Afghanistan and saves a group of villagers under siege by terrorists using Stark weapons. Stane ambushes Stark at his home and takes the arc reactor from his chest, revealing that he was responsible for Stark's captivity. Stark manages to get to his original reactor to replace it and defeats Stane, who had created his own armored suit using the remnants of Stark's first suit. The next day, The Chronicles dubs Tony's alter-ego "The Iron Man" on their newspaper headline, which he likes and takes the moniker, feeling it is catchy and sounded great when saying, evoking an aura of him being invincible despite the inaccuracy (the suit is made of titanium gold instead of iron). At a press conference, Stark publicly admits to his identity as Iron Man.

=== Battling Vanko ===
Six months later in 2011, Stark's fame has grown, and he uses his Iron Man suit for peaceful means, resisting government pressure to sell his designs, while other inventors try to build their own power suits that imitate Stark's with no successes. He reinstitutes the Stark Expo to continue his father's legacy but discovers that the palladium core in the arc reactor that keeps Stark alive and powers the armor is slowly poisoning him. Growing increasingly reckless and despondent about his impending death, he appoints Pepper Potts CEO of Stark Industries.

Stark competes in the Monaco Historic Grand Prix and is attacked mid-race by Ivan Vanko, who wields electrified whips powered by a miniature arc reactor. Stark dons his Mark V armor and defeats Vanko, but the suit is severely damaged. At his birthday party, Stark gets drunk while wearing the Mark IV suit. Rhodes dons Stark's Mark II prototype armor and tries to restrain him. The fight ends in a stalemate, so Rhodes confiscates the Mark II for the U.S. Air Force.

Stark discovers a hidden message from his father, a diagram of the structure of a new element, which Stark successfully synthesizes and integrates into his arc reactor as a non-toxic replacement for palladium. At the Expo, Stark's rival Justin Hammer unveils Vanko's armored drones, led by Rhodes in a heavily weaponized version of the Mark II armor. Stark arrives in the newly-built Mark VI armor to warn Rhodes, but Vanko remotely takes control of both the drones and Rhodes' armor and attacks Iron Man. Stark and Rhodes together defeat Vanko and his drones. After narrowly saving Pepper Potts from a self-destructing drone, they start a relationship.

=== The Battle of New York ===
In 2012, when the Asgardian Loki arrives and begins menacing Earth, seizing the Tesseract from a S.H.I.E.L.D. facility, Fury activates the Avengers Initiative and Agent Phil Coulson visits Stark to have him review the research of Erik Selvig on the Tesseract. In Stuttgart, Steve Rogers and Loki fight briefly until Tony Stark appears in his Iron Man armor, resulting in Loki's surrender. While Loki is being escorted to S.H.I.E.L.D., Thor arrives and frees him, hoping to convince him to abandon his plan and return to Asgard. After a confrontation with Stark and Rogers, Thor agrees to take Loki to S.H.I.E.L.D.'s flying aircraft carrier, the Helicarrier.

The Avengers become divided, both over how to approach Loki and the revelation that S.H.I.E.L.D. plans to harness the Tesseract to develop weapons. Agents possessed by Loki attack the Helicarrier, disabling one of its engines in flight, which Stark and Rogers must work to restart. Loki escapes, and Stark and Rogers realize that for Loki, simply defeating them will not be enough; he needs to overpower them publicly to validate himself as ruler of Earth. Loki uses the Tesseract to open a wormhole in New York City above the Stark Tower to allow the Chitauri fleet in space to invade. Fury's superiors from the World Security Council attempt to end the invasion by launching a nuclear missile at Midtown Manhattan. Stark intercepts the missile, and in an apparent sacrifice of his own life, takes it through the wormhole toward the Chitauri fleet. The missile detonates, destroying the Chitauri mothership and disabling their forces on Earth. Stark's suit runs out of power, and he falls back through the wormhole but the Hulk saves him from crashing into the ground. Stark and the other Avengers capture Loki and Thor takes custody of him.

=== Pursuing the Mandarin ===
Stark develops PTSD from his experiences during the alien invasion, resulting in panic attacks. Restless, he builds several dozen Iron Man suits, creating friction with girlfriend Pepper Potts. Seven months after the invasion, Happy Hogan is badly injured in one of a string of bombings by a terrorist known only as the Mandarin, Stark issues a televised threat to him, who destroys Stark's Malibu home with helicopter gunships. Stark escapes in an Iron Man suit and crashes in rural Tennessee. His experimental armor lacks sufficient power to return to California, and the world believes him dead.

Stark traces the Mandarin to Miami and infiltrates his headquarters, where he discovers the Mandarin was just an actor named Trevor Slattery. Aldrich Killian reveals himself to be the real Mandarin and captures Stark. He escapes and reunites with Rhodes, discovering that Killian intends to attack U.S. President Ellis aboard Air Force One. Stark saves the surviving passengers and crew but cannot stop Killian from abducting Ellis and destroying Air Force One. Killian intends to kill Ellis on an oil platform on live television. On the platform, Stark goes to save Potts – who had been kidnapped and subjected to Extremis — as Rhodes saves the president. Stark summons his Iron Man suits, controlled remotely by J.A.R.V.I.S., to provide air support. Potts, having survived the Extremis procedure, kills Killian. Stark orders J.A.R.V.I.S. to remotely destroy all of the Iron Man suits as a sign of his devotion to Potts, and undergoes surgery to remove the shrapnel embedded near his heart. He pitches his obsolete chest arc reactor into the sea, musing that he will always be Iron Man.

=== Creating Ultron ===
In 2015, Stark and the Avengers raid a Hydra facility commanded by Wolfgang von Strucker, who has been experimenting on siblings Pietro and Wanda Maximoff using the scepter previously wielded by Loki. While the team fights outside, Stark enters the lab and finds the scepter, along with Chitauri artifacts from the Battle of New York. Wanda sneaks up behind him and uses her mind manipulation powers to give him a haunting vision: the death of all the Avengers except him. Stark awakens from the vision and retrieves Loki's scepter.

Returning to the Avengers Tower, Stark and Bruce Banner discover an artificial intelligence within the scepter's gem, and secretly decide to use it to complete Stark's "Ultron" global defense program. The unexpectedly sentient Ultron eliminates Stark's A.I. J.A.R.V.I.S. and attacks the Avengers. Escaping with the scepter, Ultron builds an army of robot drones, kills Strucker and recruits the Maximoffs, who hold Stark responsible for their parents' deaths by his company's weapons. The Avengers find and attack Ultron in Johannesburg, but Wanda subdues most of the team with personalized, disturbing visions, causing Banner to transform into the Hulk and rampage until Stark stops him with his anti-Hulk armor.

After hiding at Clint Barton's house, Nick Fury arrives and encourages Stark and the others to form a plan to stop Ultron, who is discovered to have forced the team's friend Dr. Helen Cho to perfect a new body for him. Rogers, Romanoff, and Barton find Ultron and retrieve the synthetic body, but Ultron captures Romanoff. Returning to Avengers Tower, the Avengers fight amongst themselves when Stark and Banner secretly upload J.A.R.V.I.S.—who is still operational after hiding from Ultron inside the Internet—into the synthetic body. Thor returns to help activate the body, explaining that the gem on its brow was part of his vision. This "Vision" and the Maximoffs, now on their side, accompany Stark and the Avengers to Sokovia, where Ultron has used the remaining vibranium to build a machine to lift part of the capital city skyward, intending to crash it into the ground to cause global extinction. One of Ultron's drones is able to activate the machine. The city plummets, but Stark and Thor overload the machine and shatter the landmass. The Avengers establish a new base in upstate New York, and Stark leaves the team.

=== Sokovia Accords and the aftermath ===
In 2016, U.S. Secretary of State Thaddeus Ross informs the Avengers that the United Nations (UN) is preparing to pass the Sokovia Accords, which will establish UN oversight of the team. The Avengers are divided: Stark supports oversight because of his role in Ultron's creation and Sokovia's devastation, while Rogers has more faith in their judgment than that of a government. Circumstances lead to Rogers and fellow super-soldier Bucky Barnes—framed for a terrorist attack—going rogue, along with Sam Wilson, Wanda Maximoff, Clint Barton, and Scott Lang. Stark assembles a team composed of Natasha Romanoff, T'Challa, James Rhodes, Vision, and Peter Parker to capture the renegades at Leipzig/Halle Airport. However, during the battle, Rogers and Barnes are able to escape and Rhodes is paralyzed. Stark learns that Barnes was framed and convinces Wilson to give him Rogers' destination. Without informing Ross, Stark goes to the Siberian Hydra facility and strikes a truce with Rogers and Barnes. They find that the other super soldiers have been killed by Helmut Zemo, who plays footage that reveals that Barnes killed Stark's parents. Stark turns on them, dismembering Barnes' robotic arm. After an intense fight, Rogers finally manages to disable Stark's Iron Man armor and departs with Barnes, leaving his shield behind. Stark returns to New York to work on exoskeletal leg braces to allow Rhodes to walk again. Steve Rogers sends a mobile phone to Stark to keep in contact if needed. When Ross calls informing him that Rogers has broken the others out of the Raft, Stark refuses to help.

Two months later, Peter Parker resumes his high school studies, with Stark telling him he is not yet ready to become a full Avenger. Stark rescues Parker from nearly drowning after an encounter with Adrian Toomes and warns Parker against further involvement with the criminals. When another weapon from Toomes malfunctions during a fight with Parker and tears the Staten Island Ferry in half, Stark helps Parker save the passengers before admonishing him for his recklessness and confiscating his suit. Parker realizes Toomes is planning to hijack a plane transporting weapons from Stark Tower to the team's new headquarters. After Parker thwarts the plan and saves Toomes from an explosion, Stark admits he was wrong about Parker and invites him to become an Avenger full-time, but Parker declines. Potts emerges from a packed press conference, called to make the announcement, and Stark decides to use the opportunity to instead propose to Potts. At the end of the film, he returns the suit to Peter.

=== Infinity War ===
In 2018, Stark and Potts are in a New York City park discussing having children, when Banner, who had disappeared after the Battle of Sokovia, crash-lands at the New York Sanctum. Banner relays a warning to Stephen Strange, Wong, and Stark that the mad Titan Thanos plans to use the Infinity Stones to kill half of all life in the universe. Ebony Maw and Cull Obsidian arrive to retrieve the Time Stone, prompting Strange, Stark, Wong, and Parker to confront them. Although Cull Obsidian is incapacitated, Strange is captured by Maw. Stark and Parker sneak aboard Maw's spaceship to rescue him.

After successfully freeing Strange and killing Maw, the trio proceed to Thanos' home planet Titan, where they meet members of the Guardians of the Galaxy. They form a plan to confront Thanos and remove the Infinity Gauntlet, but Thanos overpowers the group and stabs Stark in the abdomen. Strange surrenders the Time Stone in exchange for Thanos sparing Stark. Thanos takes the stone and departs for Earth, retrieves the final stone, and activates the Infinity Gauntlet. Stark and Nebula, stranded on Titan, watch as Parker and others are turned to dust.

=== Time Heist and sacrifice ===
Stark and Nebula are rescued from space by Carol Danvers and returned to Earth, where Stark chooses to retire and raise his daughter Morgan, with Potts. Later, he constructs a secret beach house lab in Mexico for Banner to merge his two identities and spent some time with him including making a tiki bar. In 2023, when Scott Lang hypothesizes a way to bring back the fallen, the Avengers approach Stark, who initially refuses, considering the idea dangerous. Despite this, he examines the matter privately, discovers time travel, and agrees to help. The Avengers reassemble and plan to retrieve the Infinity Stones from the past to undo Thanos' actions. Traveling to 2012, Stark fails to retrieve the Space Stone following the Battle of New York and instead goes further back to 1970 to steal it from a S.H.I.E.L.D. facility at Camp Leigh, where he has a meaningful conversation with a younger version of his father, Howard.

The Avengers successfully obtain all of the Infinity Stones before returning to the present. The Stones are incorporated into a Nano Gauntlet made by Stark, which Banner then uses to resurrect those that were disintegrated by Thanos. However, they are followed by an alternate version of Thanos and his army, who are summoned to 2023 by an alternate version of Nebula. During the ensuing battle, Thanos obtains Stark's gauntlet and the two of them wrestle for control of it. Thanos is able to overpower Stark before attempting another snap but discovers that Stark has transferred the Infinity Stones to his own armor. Stark activates the Gauntlet and uses it to disintegrate Thanos and all of his forces and save the universe, but fatally injures himself in the process. He dies surrounded by Rhodes, Parker, and Potts.

=== Legacy ===
Eight months later, as the world continues to mourn Stark, Parker receives glasses that can access Stark's artificial intelligence E.D.I.T.H., with a message that establishes him as Stark's chosen successor. Parker is however tricked by disgruntled former Stark Industries employee Quentin Beck into giving him the glasses, as Parker sees him as a more worthy successor. Beck, leading a team of other ex-Stark Industries employees such as William Ginter Riva, and angered at being fired by Stark, seeks to fill the vacancy left by Stark as Iron Man by using the software he developed for Stark, B.A.R.F., to augment illusions of creatures known as the Elementals, presenting himself as a hero known as Mysterio in "defeating" them. He uses Stark's glasses to conduct drone attacks in London, targeting Parker. Parker eventually foils Beck's plots and retakes the glasses, and he designs his own Spider-Man suit using technology from Stark Industries, in a similar manner to Stark designing his first Iron Man armor.

== Alternate versions ==
Several alternate versions of Stark appear in the MCU multiverse, most notably in the animated series What If...?, voiced by Mick Wingert.

=== Losing the Tesseract ===
In an alternate 2012, Stark and the Avengers are victorious over Loki during the Battle of New York, however a time-traveling Stark and Scott Lang from 2023 alter 2012-Stark's history when they attempt to steal the briefcase containing the Tesseract. As 2012-Stark and 2012-Thor argue with Alexander Pierce and S.H.I.E.L.D. agents over custody of Loki and the Tesseract, Lang, using his Ant-Man suit, shrinks down and enters into 2012-Stark's chest arc reactor, pulling a plug that gives him a cardiac dysrhythmia. 2012-Thor uses Mjolnir to restart the reactor, saving 2012-Stark's life. 2023-Stark obtains the briefcase but loses it when 2012-Hulk smashes through the elevator. The Tesseract falls out, and with 2012-Stark and Thor distracted, Loki picks it up and teleports away.

=== What If...? ===
- In an alternate 2010, Stark is seemingly killed by Romanoff after she injects him with a temporary antidote to his arc reactor poisoning. Fury later deduces the culprit as Hank Pym.
- In an alternate 2018, Stark is infected with a quantum virus and is turned into a zombie along with the Avengers in San Francisco. When Bruce Banner crash-lands in the New York Sanctum to warn the heroes of Thanos's arrival, a zombified Stark attacks him alongside Stephen Strange and Wong, but is quickly killed by Hope van Dyne.
- In an alternate 2008, Erik "Killmonger" Stevens prevents Stark from being kidnapped by the Ten Rings in Afghanistan. Stark returns to the United States, where Killmonger exposes Obadiah Stane's involvement in the ambush plot, and Stark names him the new COO of Stark Industries. Stark and Killmonger build a humanoid combat drone using the vibranium of N'Jobu's ring, but Killmonger betrays and kills Stark, setting off a war between the United States and Wakanda.
- In an alternate 2015, Ultron successfully uploads his consciousness into a new vibranium body, becoming powerful enough to kill Stark and most of the Avengers, eradicating all life on Earth.
- In another alternate timeline, Stark extracted a sample of Banner's blood for further studying. Justin Hammer learned of this, and attempts to raid the Avengers Tower during Christmas Eve to acquire the sample. However, Happy Hogan, who was assigned security details for the Christmas party, accidentally injects himself with the blood sample, causing him to slowly transform into a Hulk-like creature. Hogan attempts to contact Stark, who was busy handing out gifts to children as Santa Claus at the time and unable to answer properly. Stark later returns to Avengers Tower with the other Avengers, and attacks Hogan, not realizing that the latter had transformed. Afterwards, the team apprehends Hammer and returns to celebrate Christmas, though Stark avoids answering Hogan whether there was a way to restore him to normal.
- In an alternate 2012, Stark crash-lands on Sakaar after the Battle of New York. After defeating the Grandmaster in a battle race, Stark becomes a close ally of Gamora after the death of Thanos by her hands. When the Watcher is collecting heroes to fight a multiverse-breaking version of Ultron, he selects the Gamora of this world, but pointedly excludes Stark.
- In an alternate 2014 where Banner inadvertently created the Apex Hulk and the Gamma Beasts by bombarding himself with Gamma radiation, Stark and the Avengers built gigantic Hulkbuster mechs to fight back against the monsters, but were outnumbered and killed in battle.

=== Other versions ===
In an alternate 2016, Thaddeus Ross calls in Stark to help assist arresting Otto Octavius who planned to escape his laboratory.

== Concept and creation ==
Tony Stark first premiered as a comic book character, in Tales of Suspense #39 (cover dated March 1963), a collaboration among editor and story-plotter Stan Lee, scripter Larry Lieber, story-artist Don Heck, and cover-artist and character-designer Jack Kirby. Lee wanted to create the "quintessential capitalist", a character that would go against the spirit of the times and Marvel's readership. Lee based this playboy's looks and personality on Howard Hughes, as "one of the most colorful men of our time. He was an inventor, an adventurer, a multi-billionaire, a ladies' man and finally a nutcase." The character's original costume was a bulky gray armored suit, replaced by a golden version in the second story (issue #40, April 1963), and redesigned as sleeker, red-and-golden armor in issue #48 (Dec. 1963) by Steve Ditko. Lee and Kirby included Iron Man in The Avengers #1 (Sept. 1963) as a founding member of the superhero team. In the mid-2000s, with a number of movies having been made from other Marvel properties licensed to other studios, Kevin Feige realized that Marvel still owned the rights to the core members of the Avengers, which included Iron Man. Feige, a self-professed "fanboy", envisioned creating a shared universe just as creators Stan Lee and Jack Kirby had done with their comic books in the early 1960s.

Jon Favreau, who was selected to direct the first Iron Man film, felt Downey's past made him an appropriate choice for the part, and that the actor could make Stark a "likable asshole," but also depict an authentic emotional journey once he won over the audience. Ultimately however, Downey ended up being the choice the studio made for the first character in their ever-expansive cinematic universe. Favreau was also attracted to Downey from his performance in Kiss Kiss Bang Bang (2005), with Downey frequently conversing with that film's director, Shane Black, about the script and dialogue in Iron Man.

== Appearances ==
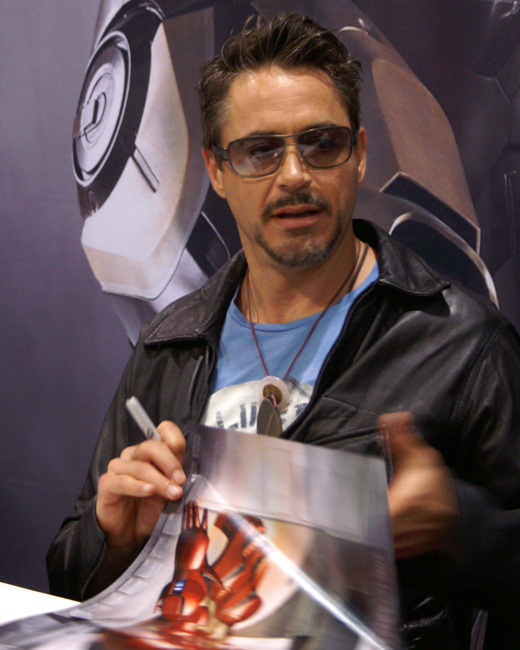
Robert Downey Jr. at Comic Con 2007, after being cast in Iron Man

Robert Downey Jr. has portrayed Tony Stark in the MCU over nine films as of 2024. He first appeared in Iron Man (2008), following with the sequel Iron Man 2 (2010). He made an uncredited cameo appearance in The Incredible Hulk (2008), and the Marvel One-Shot The Consultant (2011) through the use of archival footage. He then appeared in The Avengers (2012), Iron Man 3 (2013), Avengers: Age of Ultron (2015), Captain America: Civil War (2016), Spider-Man: Homecoming (2017), Avengers: Infinity War (2018), and Avengers: Endgame (2019).

Through the use of archival footage, Stark appeared in Spider-Man: Far From Home (2019) from Captain America: Civil War, and in "Glorious Purpose", the first episode of the Disney+ television series Loki (2021). In September 2019, Deadline Hollywood reported that Downey would appear in Black Widow (2021) in his MCU role as Stark; an early version of the script included the end scene from Captain America: Civil War between Stark and Natasha Romanoff. This was not in the final film, with director Cate Shortland stating that she and Kevin Feige decided against adding Stark or any other heroes to the film in order for Romanoff to stand on her own, and screenwriter Eric Pearson adding that it was determined that the scene did not add anything new to the story.

Alternate versions of Stark appear in the Disney+ animated series What If...? and Your Friendly Neighborhood Spider-Man, voiced by Mick Wingert; Wingert has previously provided the voice for Iron Man in multiple non-MCU video games and animated productions since 2015.

== Characterization ==
=== Appearance and personality ===
It's a fine line. If you're changing something... because you want to double-down on the spirit of who the character is? That's a change we'll make. Tony Stark not reading off the card and not sticking with the fixed story? Him just blurting out 'I am Iron Man?' That seems very much in keeping with who that character is.

— Marvel Studios President Kevin Feige on Stark revealing his alter-ego

Downey had an office next to Favreau during pre-production, which allowed him greater involvement in the screenwriting process, especially adding humor to the film. Downey explained, "What I usually hate about these [superhero] movies [is] when suddenly the guy that you were digging turns into Dudley Do-Right, and then you're supposed to buy into all his 'Let's go do some good!' That Eliot Ness-in-a-cape-type thing. What was really important to me was to not have him change so much that he's unrecognizable. When someone used to be a schmuck and they're not anymore, hopefully they still have a sense of humor." To prepare, Downey spent five days a week weight training and practiced martial arts to get into shape, which he said benefited him because "it's hard not to have a personality meltdown ... after about several hours in that suit. I'm calling up every therapeutic moment I can think of to just get through the day." The character's line "I am Iron Man", which revealed Stark's alter ego at the end of Iron Man, was improvised by Downey.

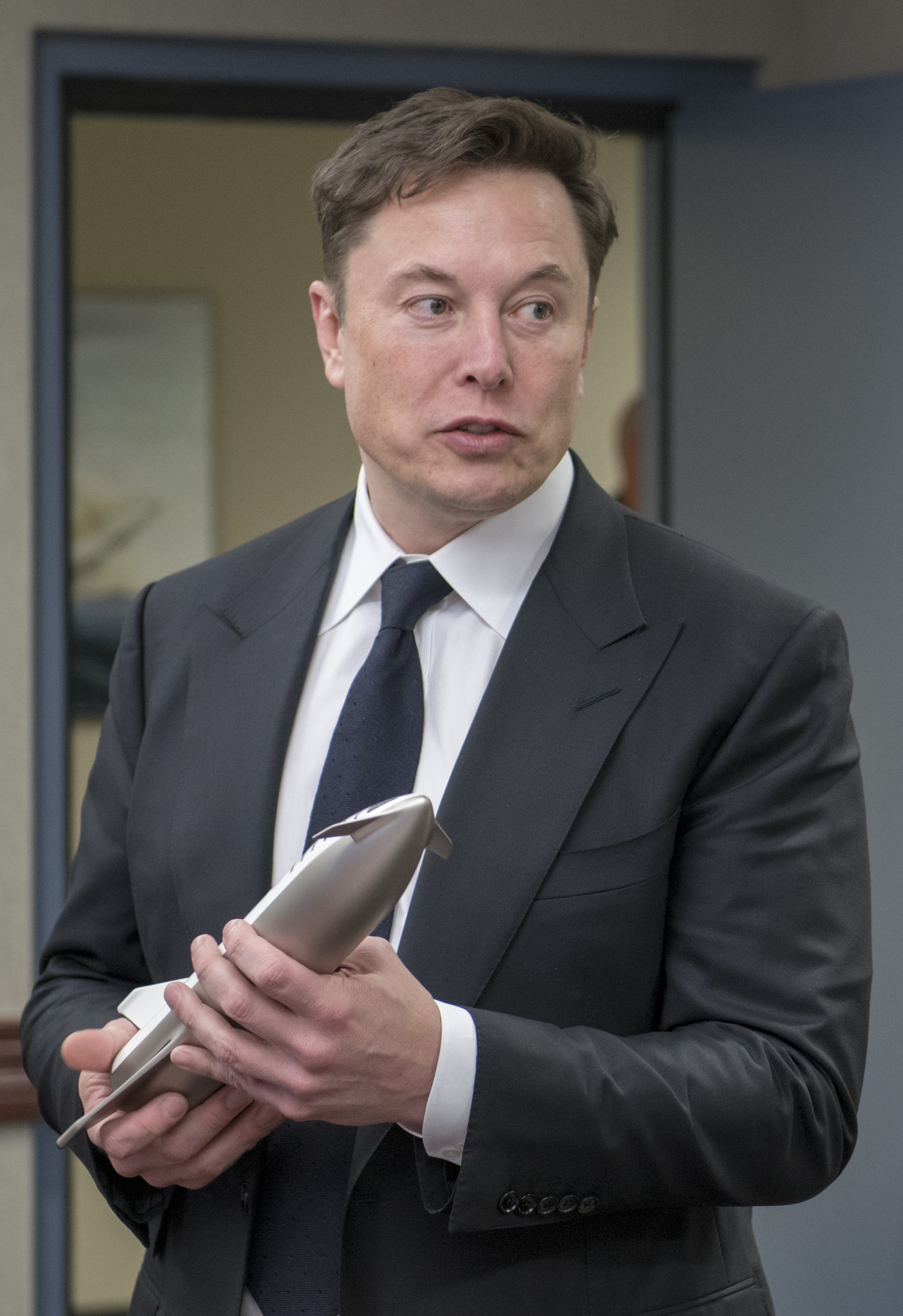
Business magnate and entrepreneur Elon Musk (above) was a key influence on the MCU's depiction of Tony Stark.

For the first film, Favreau and Downey had been handed an existing script and worked from it. In contrast, for Iron Man 2, the duo were given more freedom to conceive of the story for themselves, in which Stark struggles to keep his technology out of the hands of the government and rival weapons makers. On Stark being a hero, Downey said "It's kind of heroic, but really kind of on his own behalf. So I think there's probably a bit of an imposter complex and no sooner has he said, 'I am Iron Man –' that he's now really wondering what that means. If you have all this cushion like he does and the public is on your side and you have immense wealth and power, I think he's way too insulated to be okay."

Favreau has said that the filmmakers intentionally emphasized Stark's wit and improvisational speaking style, allowing Downey considerable freedom in dialogue delivery so that the character would feel more spontaneous and less conventional than earlier cinematic superheroes.

The Avengers introduced Stark's role as one of an ensemble of heroes who must come together to defend the Earth from an alien invasion led by the god Loki. Downey initially pushed director Joss Whedon to make Stark the lead of the 2012 Avengers film: "Well, I said, 'I need to be in the opening sequence. I don't know what you're thinking, but Tony needs to drive this thing.' He was like, 'Okay, let's try that.' We tried it and it didn't work, because this is a different sort of thing, the story and the idea and the theme is the theme, and everybody is just an arm of the octopus." About the character's evolution from previous films, Downey said, "In Iron Man, which was an origin story, he was his own epiphany and redemption of sorts. Iron Man 2 is all about not being an island, dealing with legacy issues and making space for others... In The Avengers, he's throwing it down with the others". At the climax of the film, Stark guides a nuclear missile through an interstellar portal to destroy the main alien vessel, demonstrating a willingness to sacrifice his life to save the Earth.

In Iron Man 3, Stark struggles to come to terms with his near-death experience in The Avengers, suffering from anxiety attacks. On making a third Iron Man film, Downey said, "My sense of it is that we need to leave it all on the field—whatever that means in the end. You can pick several different points of departure for that." On following up The Avengers, Downey said they "tried to be practical, in a post-Avengers world. What are his challenges now? What are some limitations that might be placed on him? And what sort of threat would have him, as usual, ignore those limitations?" Screenwriter Drew Pearce compared Stark in Iron Man 3 to an American James Bond for both being "heroes with a sense of danger to them, and unpredictability" even if Stark was a "free agent" instead of an authority figure like Bond. He also likened Tony to the protagonists of 1970s films such as The French Connection (1971), where "the idiosyncrasies of the heroes is what made them exciting."

In Avengers: Age of Ultron, Stark has become the benefactor of the Avengers. On how his character evolves after the events of Iron Man 3, Downey said, "I think he realizes that tweaking and making all the suits in the world—which is what he has been doing—still didn't work for that thing of his tour of duty that left him a little PTSD. So his focus is more on how can we make it so that there's no problem to begin with. That, you know, there's a bouncer at our planet's rope. That's the big idea." The events of Age of Ultron lead directly into the conflict of Captain America: Civil War, in which Stark leads a faction of Avengers in support of the regulation of individuals with superpowers. Anthony Russo said that Stark's egomania allowed the writers "to bring him to a point in his life where he was willing to submit to an authority, where he felt it was the right thing to do." Joe Russo added that because of the visions Stark saw in Age of Ultron, he now has a guilt complex which "drives him to make very specific decisions", calling his emotional arc "very complicated". Downey's personal trainer Eric Oram stated that the trick to pitting Rogers against Stark, "is to show Iron Man using the 'minimum force' necessary to win the fight". Marvel initially wanted Downey's part to be smaller, but "Downey wanted Stark to have a more substantial role in the film's plot." Variety noted that Downey would receive $40 million-plus backend for his participation, as well as an additional payout if the film outperformed Captain America: The Winter Soldier, as Marvel would attribute that success to Downey's presence.

In Spider-Man: Homecoming, Stark is Peter Parker's mentor and is the creator of the U.S. Department of Damage Control. Sony Pictures Motion Picture Group chairman Thomas Rothman noted that, beyond the commercial advantage of featuring Downey in the film, the inclusion of Stark was important due to the relationship established between him and Parker in Captain America: Civil War. Watts noted that after Stark's actions in Civil War, introducing Parker to life as an Avenger, there are "a lot of repercussions to that. Is it a first step towards Tony as some sort of mentor figure? Is he comfortable with that?" Co-writer Jonathan Goldstein compared Stark to Ethan Hawke's father character in Boyhood (2014).

Downey reprised the role in Avengers: Infinity War (2018) and Avengers: Endgame (2019). Iron Man 3 director Shane Black stated in March 2013 that "There has been a lot of discussion about it: 'Is this the last Iron Man for Robert [Downey Jr.]?' Something tells me that it will not be the case, and [he] will be seen in a fourth, or fifth." Marvel Studios president Kevin Feige said that the character of Stark would continue to be featured in the Marvel Cinematic Universe regardless of Downey's involvement. Also in March, Downey said he was open to extending his contract, stating he feels "there's a couple other things we've gotta do" with the character. In June 2013, when Downey signed on to return as Iron Man in Avengers: Age of Ultron, he also signed on for a third Avengers film. In a July 2014 interview during the filming of Avengers: Age of Ultron, Downey expressed his interest in continuing to play Iron Man. "It's down to Kevin [Feige] and Ike [Perlmutter, CEO of Marvel Entertainment] and Disney to come to us with what the proposal is, and that's on us to agree or disagree," Downey said. "When things are going great, there's a lot of agreement." He added, "It's that thing of: Why give up the belt when it feels like you can barely get jabbed?" In April 2016, Downey expressed openness to appearing in a potential fourth Iron Man film, saying "I could do one more." Downey's Marvel contract expired following Avengers: Endgame, where Stark dies.

Stark's fashion sense evolved over the course of the films, initially being described as "woefully basic... mostly saggy jeans, henleys and tank tops—with an occasional suit", but improving by the time of the first Avengers film, and becoming more sophisticated by Civil War, as Stark matured and accepted greater responsibility for the consequences of his actions. Downey expressed the desire for his wardrobe to reflect that "you still know he's Tony Stark, and you still know that he's the richest man in the world". Stark's clothing has been described as alternating between "a sweet suit with some shades" in his corporate look, "or a t-shirt, jeans, and an arc reactor" in his personal time. His fashion sense has been referred to as "part Mob boss and part Big Bang Theory cast member", and alternating "between boxy pinstripe suits and faux-ironic vintage tees".

=== Armor and special effects ===
Tony Stark's armor, as seen in Iron Man (2008)

Tony Stark has worn multiple different armors in his MCU appearances. For Iron Man, Stan Winston and his company built metal and rubber versions of the armors featured in the film, while Iron Man comic book artist Adi Granov designed the Mark III with illustrator Phil Saunders. Industrial Light & Magic (ILM) created the digital armors in the film, with The Orphanage and The Embassy doing additional work. To help with animating the more refined suits, information was sometimes captured by having Downey wear only the helmet, sleeves and chest of the costume over a motion capture suit.

For Iron Man 2, ILM again did the majority of the effects, as it did on the first film, with Double Negative also working on the film. In the filming of The Avengers, Weta Digital took over duties for animating Iron Man during the forest duel from ILM. For Iron Man 3, Digital Domain, Scanline VFX and Trixter each worked on separate shots featuring the Mark 42 armor, working with different digital models. The studios shared some of their files to ensure consistency between the shots. For the Mark 42 and Iron Patriot armors, Legacy Effects constructed partial suits that were worn on set.

== In other media ==
=== Theme parks ===
Tony Stark appears in his Iron Man armor in the attractions Iron Man Experience and Ant-Man and The Wasp: Nano Battle! at Hong Kong Disneyland, and Avengers Assemble: Flight Force at Walt Disney Studios Park.

==== Video games ====
Iron Man / Tony Stark appears in the action-adventure video games Iron Man, and Iron Man 2, loosely based on their respective films. The character also makes an appearance in the mobile phone game Iron Man 3: The Official Game, also loosely based on its film.

== Differences from the comics ==
The origin story of Iron Man has been updated for the films. In the comics, Stark becomes Iron Man following an experience in the Vietnam War, which is changed to the War in Afghanistan. Jarvis, in the comics, is the family butler, while in the films J.A.R.V.I.S. is an artificial intelligence created by Stark, though still inspired by the butler from Stark's childhood, Edwin Jarvis, who is revealed to have died by the time the first film takes place. Stark also proceeds through the early iterations of his armor to reach the now-familiar red and gold color scheme much more quickly. Stark's personality more closely resembles the Ultimate Comics version.

The AI version of J.A.R.V.I.S. is eventually uploaded by Stark to an artificial body and becomes Vision. In the films, Vision is created by Stark and Banner as a counter to Ultron. In the comics, however, Ultron is created by a different member of the Avengers, Hank Pym, and aspects of Pym's personality are integrated into this version of Ultron, such as a desire for peace. Another difference in the films is the romance between Stark and Pepper Potts. In the comics, Potts has unrequited feelings for Stark, and ultimately becomes involved with Stark's chauffeur and bodyguard, Happy Hogan.

A new approach not seen in comics is Stark's mentorial relationship with Peter Parker. In the Ultimate Comics, Stark and Parker do not go past the normal trainer-trainee relationship. In the MCU, Stark is also the creator of two iterations of Parker's Spider-Man suits, unlike in the comics where he only creates the Iron Spider Armor, while Parker creates other suits by himself. Stark is also shown to have a history with Parker's foes Vulture and Mysterio; both are depicted as having turned into villains due to unforeseen consequences of actions by Stark. While he does not end up facing them, his protégé does.

The Mandarin, a recurring Iron Man villain in the comics, turns out to be just an actor portraying the character, with the real criminal mastermind behind the acts claimed by "the Mandarin" being Aldrich Killian—a minor character in the comics. The Mandarin is revealed to be a real person in the Marvel One-Shot All Hail the King; this version is instead portrayed as the father and enemy of Shang-Chi in Shang-Chi and the Legend of the Ten Rings (2021).

== Reception and impact ==
Downey's portrayal of the character has been widely praised by fans and critics. Roger Ebert praised Downey's performance in Iron Man, stating "At the end of the day it's Robert Downey Jr. who powers the lift-off separating this from most other superhero movies". Frank Lovece of Film Journal International, a one-time Marvel Comics writer, commended that Iron Man 2 "doesn't find a changed man. Inside the metal, imperfect humanity grows even more so, as thought-provoking questions of identity meet techno-fantasy made flesh".

For The Avengers, Joe Morgenstern of The Wall Street Journal—despite complimenting Downey's performance—favored his work in Iron Man over his acting in The Avengers: "His Iron Man is certainly a team player, but Mr. Downey comes to the party with two insuperable superpowers: a character of established sophistication—the industrialist/inventor Tony Stark, a sharp-tongued man of the world—and his own quicksilver presence that finds its finest expression in self-irony". In his review of Avengers: Endgame, Morgenstern lauded both actor and character, praising "Robert Downey Jr.'s startlingly smart Tony Stark" who, along with Chris Evans' Captain America and Chris Hemsworth's Thor, contributed to that film's "feeling of family ... because the debuts of its most prominent members remain vivid to this day."

In 2015, Empire named Tony Stark the 13th greatest film character of all time. In 2019, following the releaseAvengers: Endgame which depicted Stark's death, a statue representing the character in his Iron Man armor was erected in Forte dei Marmi, Italy.

=== Accolades ===
Downey has received numerous nominations and awards for his portrayal of Tony Stark. He notably won the Saturn Award for Best Actor three times, making him a record four-time winner (he had previously won the award for 1993's Heart and Souls); it is also the record for most wins for portraying the same character, tied with Mark Hamill for playing Luke Skywalker.

Year	Film	Award	Category	Result	Ref(s)
2008	Iron Man	Teen Choice Awards	Choice Movie Actor: Action	Nominated	
2008	Iron Man	Scream Awards	Best Science Fiction Actor	Won	
2008	Iron Man	Scream Awards	Best Superhero	Nominated	
2009	Iron Man	People's Choice Awards	Favorite Male Action Star	Nominated	
2009	Iron Man	People's Choice Awards	Favorite Male Movie Star	Nominated	
2009	Iron Man	People's Choice Awards	Favorite Superhero	Nominated	
2009	Iron Man	Empire Awards	Best Actor	Nominated	
2009	Iron Man	MTV Movie Awards	Best Male Performance	Nominated	
2009	Iron Man	Saturn Awards	Best Actor	Won	
2010	Iron Man 2	Teen Choice Awards	Choice Movie Actor: Sci-Fi	Nominated	
2010	Iron Man 2	Teen Choice Awards	Choice Movie: Dance	Nominated	
2010	Iron Man 2	Teen Choice Awards	Choice Movie: Fight (with Don Cheadle)	Nominated	
2010	Iron Man 2	Scream Awards	Best Science Fiction Actor	Nominated	
2010	Iron Man 2	Scream Awards	Best Superhero	Won	
2011	Iron Man 2	People's Choice Awards	Favorite Movie Actor	Nominated	
2011	Iron Man 2	People's Choice Awards	Favorite Action Star	Nominated	
2011	Iron Man 2	People's Choice Awards	Favorite On-Screen Team (with Don Cheadle)	Nominated	
2011	Iron Man 2	Kids' Choice Awards	Favorite Buttkicker	Nominated	
2011	Iron Man 2	MTV Movie Awards	Biggest Badass Star	Nominated	
2011	Iron Man 2	Saturn Awards	Best Actor	Nominated	
2012	The Avengers	Teen Choice Awards	Choice Movie Actor: Sci-Fi/Fantasy	Nominated	
2012	The Avengers	Teen Choice Awards	Choice Summer Movie Star: Male	Nominated	
2013	The Avengers	People's Choice Awards	Favorite Movie Actor	Won	
2013	The Avengers	People's Choice Awards	Favorite Action Movie Star	Nominated	
2013	The Avengers	People's Choice Awards	Favorite Movie Superhero	Won	
2013	The Avengers	Critics' Choice Awards	Best Actor in an Action Movie	Nominated	
2013	The Avengers	Kids' Choice Awards	Favorite Male Buttkicker	Nominated	
2013	The Avengers	Empire Awards	Best Actor	Nominated	
2013	The Avengers	MTV Movie Awards	Best On-Screen Duo (with Mark Ruffalo)	Nominated	
2013	The Avengers	MTV Movie Awards	Best Fight (with cast)	Won	
2013	The Avengers	MTV Movie Awards	Best Hero	Nominated	
2013	Iron Man 3	Teen Choice Awards	Choice Movie Actor: Action	Won	
2013	Iron Man 3	Teen Choice Awards	Choice Movie Actor: Sci-Fi/Fantasy	Nominated	
2013	Iron Man 3	Teen Choice Awards	Choice Movie: Chemistry (with Don Cheadle)	Nominated	
2014	Iron Man 3	People's Choice Awards	Favorite Movie Actor	Nominated	
2014	Iron Man 3	People's Choice Awards	Favorite Movie Duo (with Gwyneth Paltrow)	Nominated	
2014	Iron Man 3	People's Choice Awards	Favorite Action Movie Star	Won	
2014	Iron Man 3	Critics' Choice Awards	Best Actor in an Action Movie	Nominated	
2014	Iron Man 3	Kids' Choice Awards	Favorite Male Buttkicker	Won	
2014	Iron Man 3	Kids' Choice Awards	Favorite Movie Actor	Nominated	
2014	Iron Man 3	MTV Movie Awards	Best Hero	Nominated	
2014	Iron Man 3	Saturn Awards	Best Actor	Won	
2015	Avengers: Age of Ultron	Teen Choice Awards	Choice Movie Actor: Sci-Fi/Fantasy	Nominated	
2016	Avengers: Age of Ultron	People's Choice Awards	Favorite Movie Actor	Nominated	
2016	Avengers: Age of Ultron	People's Choice Awards	Favorite Action Movie Actor	Nominated	
2016	Avengers: Age of Ultron	Kids' Choice Awards	Favorite Movie Actor	Nominated	
2016	Avengers: Age of Ultron	MTV Movie Awards	Best Fight (with Mark Ruffalo)	Nominated	
2016	Captain America: Civil War	Teen Choice Awards	Choice Movie Actor: Sci-Fi/Fantasy	Nominated	
2016	Captain America: Civil War	Teen Choice Awards	Choice Movie: Chemistry (with cast)	Nominated	
2017	Captain America: Civil War	People's Choice Awards	Favorite Movie Actor	Nominated	
2017	Captain America: Civil War	People's Choice Awards	Favorite Action Movie Actor	Won	
2017	Captain America: Civil War	Kids' Choice Awards	Favorite Movie Actor	Nominated	
2017	Captain America: Civil War	Kids' Choice Awards	Favorite Frenemies (with Chris Evans)	Nominated	
2017	Captain America: Civil War	Kids' Choice Awards	#Squad (with cast)	Nominated	
2018	Avengers: Infinity War	Teen Choice Awards	Choice Action Movie Actor	Won	
2018	Avengers: Infinity War	People's Choice Awards	Male Movie Star of 2018	Nominated	
2019	Avengers: Infinity War	Kids' Choice Awards	Favorite Superhero	Won	
2019	Avengers: Endgame	MTV Movie & TV Awards	Best Hero	Won	
2019	Avengers: Endgame	Teen Choice Awards	Choice Action Movie Actor	Won	
2019	Avengers: Endgame	Saturn Awards	Best Actor	Won	
2019	Avengers: Endgame	People's Choice Awards	Male Movie Star of 2019	Won	
2019	Avengers: Endgame	People's Choice Awards	Action Movie Star of 2019	Nominated	

== See also ==
- Characters of the Marvel Cinematic Universe
- Iron Man in other media
