= Iron Man's armor (Marvel Cinematic Universe) =

Iron Man's armor in the Marvel Cinematic Universe

- Marvel Cinematic Universe element
- The Mark III armor as featured in Iron Man (2008)
- First appearance: Iron Man; (2008)
- Based on: Iron Man's armor by: Don Heck; Jack Kirby
- Adapted by: Mark Fergus Hawk Ostby; Art Marcum Matt Holloway

In-universe information
- Owners: Tony Stark; James Rhodes (War Machine armor); Peter Parker (Iron Spider armor); Bruce Banner (Hulkbuster armor); Pepper Potts (Rescue armor)

Tony Stark has worn different versions of the Iron Man armor throughout the Marvel Cinematic Universe (MCU). He has also built armor for James Rhodes (which became the War Machine armor), the Iron Spider suit for Peter Parker, and Pepper Potts' Rescue armor.

The physical armor used in Iron Man (2008) was built by Stan Winston Studios, with the digital version and other visual effects created by Industrial Light & Magic. Further appearances of the armor in the MCU were mainly created through visual effects. Iron Man comic book artist Adi Granov designed the Mark III, with further armors also being inspired by the armors from the comics.

== Design and creation ==
The Hall of Armor display at the 2012 San Diego Comic-Con, featuring the Marks I-VII (back) and Mark XLII (front)

Iron Man (2008) director Jon Favreau wanted the film to be believable by showing the eventual construction of the Mark III suit in its three stages. Stan Winston and his company were hired to build metal and rubber versions of the armors. The Mark I design was intended to look like it was built from spare parts: particularly, the back is less armored than the front, as Tony Stark would use his resources to make a forward attack. It also foreshadows the design of Obadiah Stane's Iron Monger armor. A single 90-pound (41 kg) version was built and was designed to only have its top half worn at times. Stan Winston Studios built a 10-foot (3.0 m), 800-pound (360 kg) animatronic version of the Iron Monger suit. The animatronic required five operators for the arm, and was built on a gimbal to simulate walking. A scale model was used for the shots of it being made. The Mark II resembles an airplane prototype with visible flaps.

Iron Man comic book artist Adi Granov designed the Mark III with illustrator Phil Saunders. Granov's designs were the primary inspiration for the film's, and he came on board the film after he recognized his work on Jon Favreau's MySpace page. Saunders streamlined Granov's concept art, making it stealthier and less cartoonish in its proportions, and also designed the War Machine armor, but it was "cut from the script about halfway through pre-production." He explained that the War Machine armor "was going to be called the Mark IV armor and would have had weaponized swap-out parts that would be worn over the original Mark III armor," and that it "would have been worn by Tony Stark in the final battle sequence." Concerned with the transition between the computer-generated and practical costumes, Favreau hired Industrial Light & Magic (ILM) to create the bulk of the visual effects for the film after seeing Pirates of the Caribbean: At World's End (2007) and Transformers (2007). The Orphanage and The Embassy did additional work. To help with animating the more refined suits, information was sometimes captured by having Downey wear only the helmet, sleeves and chest of the costume over a motion capture suit.

For Iron Man 2 (2010), ILM again did the majority of the effects, as it did on the first film. ILM's visual effects supervisor on the film, Ben Snow, said their work on the film was "harder" than their work on the first, stating that Favreau asked more of them this time around. Snow described the process of digitally creating the suits:

On the first Iron Man, we tried to use the Legacy [Studios, Stan Winston's effects company] and Stan Winston suits as much as we could. For the second one, Jon [Favreau] was confident we could create the CG suits, and the action dictated using them. So, Legacy created what we called the "football suits" from the torso up with a chest plate and helmet. We'd usually put in some arm pieces, but not the whole arm. In the house fight sequence, where Robert Downey Jr. staggers around tipsy, we used some of the practical suit and extended it digitally. Same thing in the Randy's Donuts scene. But in the rest of the film, we used the CG suit entirely. And Double Negative did an all-digital suit for the Monaco chase.

Because of how form-fitting the Mark V suitcase suit was required to be, the production team researched some of the classic comics armors, since they were seen as essentially variations on muscle suits. One specific aspect of an earlier armor was the color scheme from the Silver Centurion armor. The Mark VI armor was designed by Granov and Saunders to be sleeker than the Mark III, while retaining many of the Mark III's qualities.

For The Avengers (2012), Saunders stated that "director Joss Whedon was looking for something that had the 'cool' factor of the suitcase suit" from Iron Man 2, but would be tough enough to survive the alien army from the film's climax. Saunders reworked concepts from the first two films into the Mark VII, a design with "big ammo packets on the arms and a backpack". The chest piece, which had been triangular in the Mark VI, was changed back to the classic circular shape of the Mark III. Weta Digital also took over duties for animating Iron Man during the forest duel from ILM. Guy Williams, Weta's visual effects supervisor, said, "We shared assets back and forth with ILM, but our pipelines are unique and it's hard for other assets to plug into it. But in this case, we got their models and we had to redo the texture spaces because the way we texture maps is different." Williams said the most difficult part was re-creating Iron Man's reflective metal surfaces.

For Iron Man 3 (2013), Chris Townsend served as visual effects supervisor. The film featured over 2,000 visual effects shots and was worked on by 17 studios: Weta Digital, Digital Domain, Scanline VFX, Trixter, Framestore, Luma Pictures, Fuel VFX, Cantina Creative, Cinesite, The Embassy Visual Effects, Lola, Capital T, Prologue, and Rise FX. Digital Domain, Scanline VFX, and Trixter each worked on separate shots that featured the Mark XLII armor, working with different digital models. The studios shared some of their files to ensure consistency between the shots. For the Mark XLII and Iron Patriot armors, Legacy Effects constructed partial suits that were worn on set. Townsend explained that "Invariably we'd shoot a soft-suit with Robert [Downey Jr.] then we'd also put tracking markers on his trousers. He would also wear lifts in his shoes or be up in a box so he'd be the correct height – Iron Man is 6'5".

The art department at Marvel worked closely with a team from Digital Domain, which created realistically-proportioned 3D versions of suits, including textures and lighting, from Marvel's 2D concept art. Those models were then used by Marvel and Weta Digital. The heads-up display features of the helmet were inspired by visualization techniques from MRI diagnostic pattern recognition and graph theory, particularly by the connectogram, a circular graph that maps all of the white-matter connections of the human brain.

Concept art released in March 2014 for Avengers: Age of Ultron (2015), revealed the inclusion of a "Hulkbuster"–like armor. Iron Man's armor in Spider-Man: Homecoming (2017), the Mark XLVII, is a recolored version of the Mark XLVI armor introduced in Captain America: Civil War (2016); this was done because Sony Pictures did not have the budget to create a new Iron Man suit. Feige requested the color scheme resemble the Ultimate Iron Man armor from the comics. For Avengers: Infinity War (2018), visual effects vendor Framestore created Iron Man's Mark 50 suit, based on the Bleeding Edge armor from the comics, which is made up of singular nanobots which move around his body to form a suit, and was developed alongside Marvel for about two years.

== List of armors ==
=== Main armor ===
Name	Introduced	Notes
Mark I	Iron Man	Created by Tony Stark and Ho Yinsen, the suit left the back and knees vulnerable. It had flamethrowers and a missile launcher, and was capable of one short burst of flight before it crashed. The armor was destroyed during Stark's escape in Afghanistan; he later rebuilt it but it was destroyed again in the attack on Stark's house in Iron Man 3.
Mark II	Iron Man	The Mark II armor improves flight capabilities, adds a heads-up-display and repulsors, and has a built in arc reactor. However, the suit experiences icing problems when flown at excessive altitude. The suit needs a special construction/removal apparatus to get in and out of. It was destroyed during the attack on Stark's house in Iron Man 3.
Mark III	Iron Man	The Mark III fixes the freezing problem by changing the suit to a gold-titanium alloy. It also adds wrist-mounted missiles, hip-mounted flare launchers and shoulder-mounted machine guns. This is the first armor to feature the classic red and gold color scheme. This armor is destroyed during the attack on Stark's house in Iron Man 3.
Mark IV	Iron Man 2	Not much is known about the Mark IV as it is briefly seen when Stark enters the Stark Expo 2010. However, it does have a manually removable helmet. This armor is destroyed during the attack on Stark's house in Iron Man 3.
Mark V	Iron Man 2	The Mark V is a travel, portable suit, also known as the "suitcase suit", that assembles around Stark's body. Not much else is known about the armor, such as if it has flight capabilities. The armor takes on a red and silver color scheme, similar to the Silver Centurion armor from the comics. This armor is destroyed during the attack on Stark's house in Iron Man 3.
Mark VI	Iron Man 2	This armor changes the arc reactor hole to a triangular shape instead of the traditional circular one. The armor also upgrades its artillery to include a grenade launcher in one arm, a missile launcher in a shoulder and metal-slicing super lasers in both arms (though this can only be used once). The color scheme is once again the classic red and gold. Stark uses this armor for much of The Avengers before switching to the Mark VII after the Mark VI suffers significant damage. This armor is destroyed during the attack on Stark's house in Iron Man 3.
Mark VII	The Avengers	The suit is able to assemble around Stark via a sensor bracelet worn by him, and brings back the circular arc reactor hole. The suit is not designed for deep space travel. The armor reappears briefly in Iron Man 3 before being destroyed during the attack on Stark's house.
Mark XLII	Iron Man 3	This suit is able to be summoned remotely by controlling each individual piece of the armor, through state-of-the-art chips in Stark's body, and features an inverse color scheme to the other main armors, with gold as the predominant color. Stark is able to operate the suit externally from a remote location. This armor is destroyed at the end of Iron Man 3, but it is rebuilt by the events of Spider-Man: Homecoming where it can be seen briefly.
Mark XLIII	Avengers: Age of Ultron	This suit is identical to the Mark XLII, but with an inverse red/gold color scheme. The Mark XLIII has an unmanned sentry mode that allows Stark to exit the suit and remain protected. It can also be augmented with the Mark XLIV "Veronica" modular add-on in order to take on the Hulk.
Mark XLV	Avengers: Age of Ultron	Featuring a predominantly red color scheme and a hexagonal-shaped arc reactor, Stark wears this suit during the Avengers' final confrontation with Ultron in Sokovia. Due to J.A.R.V.I.S. being uploaded to give birth to Vision, this suit was the first one to feature F.R.I.D.A.Y. as Stark's A.I. interface.
Mark XLVI	Captain America: Civil War	Visually similar to the Mark XLV with a pentagon-shaped arc reactor. The helmet is retractable and able to fold into the back of the suit. The suit uses hybrid nanotechnology, and is an homage to the character's Bleeding Edge armor from the comics.
Mark XLVII	Spider-Man: Homecoming	A predominately silver color scheme with the head, chest and extremities also featuring gold and red. The armor is visually similar to the one worn by Ultimate Iron Man in the comics. The armor is a repainted version of the Mark XLVI. Like the Mark XLII, the armor can be controlled remotely by Stark.
Mark L	Avengers: Infinity War	Known as the Bleeding Edge armor, it has rocket thrusters that allows Stark to travel in deep space. The suit has the ability to form around Stark out of his arc reactor using nanotechnology, which can regenerate itself if it sustains damage. Visually, this armor is based on the Model Prime armor from the comics. The mark number has been stylized as both decimal (50) and Roman numeral (L). The helmet is briefly seen in Avengers: Endgame when Stark uses it to record a goodbye message while trapped in outer space.
Mark LXXXV	Avengers: Endgame	This armor has a similar look to the Mark L, with gold upper sleeves, shoulder guards, and a slightly bulkier design. It retains the nanotechnology from the Mark L and has the ability to form an Infinity Gauntlet.
Sakaarian Armor (alternate timeline)	What If...? season 1 "What If... the Watcher Broke His Oath?"; What If...? season 2 "What If... Iron Man Crashed Into the Grandmaster?"	In an alternate 2012 universe where Stark crash-landed on Sakaar following the Chitauri invasion, Stark built this new armor after Mark VII was too damaged to operate. The suit can transform into a race car, which Stark drives to win a race with the Grandmaster.

=== Iron Legion ===
These armors were created before the beginning of Iron Man 3 by Stark, where they were introduced, to help in different types of situations he might encounter. They are first referred to as the "Iron Legion" in Iron Man 3 Prelude #2 (April 2013). The first Iron Legion is a set of 34 specialized armors built for various situations that he might encounter such. Built due to his insomnia, he eventually destroys them due to the friction they cause between him and Pepper Potts. They appeared in Iron Man 3 and consisted of armors Mark VIII through Mark XLI. The second Iron Legion is a set of drones built by Tony Stark in order to aid the Avengers. However, after the creation of the AI Ultron, it builds itself a body from a destroyed drone, and takes control of the rest.

=== Hulkbuster armor ===
Promotional image of the Mark XLIV

Name	Introduced	Notes
Mark XLIV	Avengers: Age of Ultron	A modular add-on known as the Hulkbuster armor, it was developed by Tony Stark and Bruce Banner, after they studied the Hulk's physical actions and strength levels in an effort to find a way to contain him and minimize the damage caused by his rages. Its codename is "Veronica", in a reference to Archie Comics. Banner is involved with Betty Ross, so Age of Ultron director Joss Whedon went for the two women that dispute Archie Andrews' affection - "the opposite of Betty is Veronica".
Mark XLVIII	Avengers: Infinity War	An update to the Mark XLIV modular add-on, and known as Hulkbuster 2.0, it features a sleeker, less blocky design, with additions of silver in its color scheme. Unlike the original Hulkbuster, it can apparently be used on its own without being "worn" over another armor, with Banner using the Hulkbuster during the battle for Wakanda against Thanos's forces when he finds himself unable to transform into the Hulk. Banner also briefly uses it at the beginning of Avengers: Endgame.

=== Related armors ===
==== War Machine armor ====
Promotional image of the War Machine Mark I

Name	Introduced	Notes
War Machine Mark I	Iron Man 2	Originally the Iron Man Mark II armor, this suit is confiscated by James Rhodes on behalf of the US Government and enhanced by Justin Hammer, who adds assault rifles on the wrists, a minigun on the right shoulder and a missile launcher on the left. The armor still retains repulsors in the chest and hands. In Iron Man 3 Prelude, Stark reclaims the Mark II armor from Rhodes and removes all the modifications done to it by Hammer.
War Machine Mark II / Iron Patriot	Iron Man 3	The second War Machine armor, given to Rhodes by Stark, has a rectangular-shaped chestplate protecting the arc reactor assembly. In Iron Man 3, Rhodes was asked by the president to take on the moniker, "Iron Patriot", and add a red, white, and blue color scheme to be used as the government's "American hero" symbol in response to the events in The Avengers. The armor reverts to the grey and silver color scheme in Avengers: Age of Ultron.
War Machine Mark III	Captain America: Civil War	The armor worn in Civil War appears similar to the others seen. It is damaged through friendly fire when Rhodes is struck by a Mind Stone beam fired by Vision, which disables the suit's flight capacity, and Rhodes falls to the ground, paralyzing him from the waist down on impact.
War Machine Mark IV	Avengers: Infinity War	This version of the armor includes an "exo-skeleton" worn on his legs and lower back when Rhodes is not wearing the full armor, allowing him to walk despite the spinal injuries sustained in Civil War.
War Machine Mark V	Avengers: Endgame	Known as the Cosmic Iron Patriot armor, it has a red, white, and blue color scheme similar to the Iron Patriot armor. It is bulkier than past War Machine armors, and was built with alien technology. The armor has two shoulder guns, turrets, and rocket launchers, with additional weaponry on the forearms.
War Machine Mark VI	Avengers: Endgame	The armor worn in Endgame appears similar to the others seen. Rhodes wore that armor during the Time Heist. The armor was damaged during Thanos' bombardment.

==== Non-Iron Man armors ====
Name	Introduced	Notes
Iron Monger	Iron Man	Suit created by Obadiah Stane, based on the designs Stark used to create the Mark I armor.
Whiplash Armor Mark II	Iron Man 2	Created by Ivan Vanko AKA Whiplash as part of his second attempt to kill Tony Stark as revenge for Tony's father, Howard, discrediting his father Anton. Based on Stark's Mark II armor.
Iron Spider	Spider-Man: Homecoming	A nanotech armor given to Peter Parker. This armor has enhanced web shooters, a parachute, life support systems, and four robotic spider legs coming out of the back.
Mark XLIX/Rescue	Avengers: Endgame	A blue and gold armor designed by Stark for Potts.
Hydra Stomper	What If...?	Introduced in the first episode, the Hydra Stomper is an armor made by Howard Stark and is piloted by a non-superpowered Steve Rogers in World War II. It shares a similar design with the Iron Man Mark I but has an energy repulser. The entire armor is powered by the Tesseract.
Ironheart Mark I	Black Panther: Wakanda Forever	Made by Riri Williams, who was inspired by Tony Stark, in her garage, Mark I is much bulkier than Stark's later suits, while having no helmet and leaving many exposed areas, such as the knees and waist. The suit's right hand has a repulsor and is three-fingered. The suit also has flight capability and an arc reactor on its chest, though it is more akin to a heart.
Ironheart Mark II	Black Panther: Wakanda Forever	Using Wakandan technology, Riri Williams creates a suit of powered armor to defend Wakanda in honor Queen Ramonda sacrificing her life to save Williams. Mark II covers the user's entire body, and is much more similar to Stark's armor than Mark I. The suit has energy rifles, repulsors, a similar creation to Shuri's panther gauntlets. Mark II also has a heads-up display and is able to travel underwater.
Ironheart Mark III	Ironheart	The third Ironheart armor made by Riri Williams following the Mark II's decommissioning by Wakandan authorities. The Mark III is made using MIT resources funded by Williams herself.
Ironheart Mark IV	Ironheart	The fourth Ironheart armor made by Riri Williams.
Ironheart Mark V	Ironheart	The fifth Ironheart armor made by Williams, the suit is made using parts from her car restoration project in Gary's garage. The armor has a red-black color scheme similar to the Mark II, and is powered by magic in order to counter Parker Robbins' dark magic.
Hydra Stomper Mark II	What If...?	Introduced in the first season finale's mid-credit scene, the second mark of the Hydra Stomper was replicated by the agents of the Red Room, who also brainwashed Steve Rogers into becoming their master assassin. It is similar to Mark I, but smaller and does not require the Tesseract as a power source.

==== Avengers Campus ====
Avengers Campus has an exclusive Iron Man armor for Disney Parks, known as the Mark 80.
