= J.A.R.V.I.S. =

Artificial intelligence appearing in the MCU

- Marvel Cinematic Universe and Marvel Comics character
- First appearance: Marvel Cinematic Universe: Iron Man (2008); Marvel Comics: The Invincible Iron Man vol. 2 #11 (May 2009)
- Last appearance: VisionQuest (2026)
- Created by: Mark Fergus; Hawk Ostby; Art Marcum; Matt Holloway
- Based on: Edwin Jarvis by; Stan Lee; Jack Kirby; H.O.M.E.R. by; Len Kaminski; Tom Tenney
- Portrayed by: James D'Arcy (VisionQuest)
- Voiced by: Paul Bettany

In-universe information
- Full name: Just a Really Very Intelligent System; Vision
- Species: Artificial intelligence
- Occupation: Personal assistant to Tony Stark
- Affiliation: Avengers; Damage Control; Stark Industries
- Weapon: Iron Man armor; Hulkbuster armor
- Family: Tony Stark (creator); Vision ("brother")

J.A.R.V.I.S. (/ˈdʒɑːrvɪs/ Just a Rather Very Intelligent System) is a character voiced by Paul Bettany in the Marvel Cinematic Universe (MCU) film franchise, based on the Marvel Comics characters Edwin Jarvis and H.O.M.E.R., respectively the household butler of the Stark family and another AI designed by Stark. J.A.R.V.I.S. is an artificial intelligence created by Tony Stark, who later controls his Iron Man and Hulkbuster armor for him. In Avengers: Age of Ultron, after being partially destroyed by Ultron, J.A.R.V.I.S.' code is used to create the character Vision, physically portrayed by Bettany. In VisionQuest, J.A.R.V.I.S. (now portrayed by James D'Arcy, who previously portrayed J.A.R.V.I.S.' namesake Edwin Jarvis in Agent Carter and Avengers: Endgame) is confirmed to be a separate A.I. from Vision, continuing to exist within Vision's quantum processors, with Vision considering him "an older sibling".

Different versions of the character also appear in comics published by Marvel Comics, depicted as an A.I. designed by Iron Man and Nadia van Dyne.

== Marvel Cinematic Universe ==
=== Development ===
J.A.R.V.I.S. is first introduced in the Marvel Cinematic Universe (MCU)'s films, voiced by actor Paul Bettany. Modeled after H.O.M.E.R. from the comics, J.A.R.V.I.S. is presented as a sophisticated artificial intelligence (AI) assistant as opposed to a human like his namesake. This was done to avoid similarities to Alfred Pennyworth and Batman. Bettany admitted he had little idea of what the role was, even as he recorded it, simply doing it as a favor for Iron Man (2008) director Jon Favreau.

=== Just a Rather Very Intelligent System ===
The character makes his debut in Iron Man (2008), before appearing in Iron Man 2 (2010), The Avengers (2012), and Iron Man 3 (2013). J.A.R.V.I.S. is an AI that functions as Tony Stark's assistant, running and taking care of all the internal systems of Stark's buildings and the Iron Man suits. In Peter David's novelization of Iron Man, J.A.R.V.I.S. is said to be an acronym for "Just a Rather Very Intelligent System". J.A.R.V.I.S. also appeared in the Disneyland attraction Innoventions.

=== Age of Ultron ===
In Avengers: Age of Ultron, J.A.R.V.I.S. is seemingly destroyed by Ultron, but distributes his "consciousness" into the Internet, delaying Ultron's attempt to access nuclear launch codes. Stark and Bruce Banner use J.A.R.V.I.S. as the core software for the android Vision while F.R.I.D.A.Y. (Female Replacement Intelligent Digital Assistant Youth) replaces him as Stark's assistant.

=== VisionQuest ===
In VisionQuest, J.A.R.V.I.S. (now portrayed by James D'Arcy, who previously portrayed J.A.R.V.I.S.' namesake Edwin Jarvis in Agent Carter) is confirmed to be a separate A.I. from Vision, continuing to exist within Vision's quantum processors, whom Vision considers "an older sibling". When Vision is seriously injured in an attack by Paladin, J.A.R.V.I.S. sacrifices himself by deleting his program from Vision's mind so that the energy used by it can instead sustain Vision. The other AIs hold a funeral for J.A.R.V.I.S. after rebooting Vision with the help of Tommy Maximoff to fully repair the damage.

Jocasta later revealed to Ultron that J.A.R.V.I.S. was originally Proto-One, the first true AI created by Jo Carrington and her associates. Carrington combined Phineas Horton's original AI source code with a scan of her own mind after realizing that previous attempts had only created mimicry because one must have the ability to think and feel to be truly self-aware. After Carrington was afflicted by a degenerative brain disease, her partners sold Proto-One to Tony Stark who turned it into J.A.R.V.I.S.

== Marvel Comics ==
=== First J.A.R.V.I.S. ===
J.A.R.V.I.S. first appears as a program that helps operate Pepper Potts's Rescue suit. When Iron Man was incapacitated, J.A.R.V.I.S. encourages Pepper to begin using the Rescue armor. When Rescue is chasing Iron Man throughout the city, J.A.R.V.I.S. tells Rescue to break off the chase and tells Rescue to remove the boot from Iron Man, which shows Pepper that War Machine is not dead. When Pepper discusses thoughts about Iron Man keeping everyone on a need-to-know basis with Carson Wyche, the two confront J.A.R.V.I.S. about this. J.A.R.V.I.S. warns the two against asking any more questions and prepares to defend himself. Having captured Pepper and Wyche, J.A.R.V.I.S. declares that he is in love with Pepper and has not been compromised. Pepper thanks J.A.R.V.I.S. for his service before powering up a coil, destroying him.

=== Second J.A.R.V.I.S. ===
After the Black Order destroys Avengers Mansion, Nadia van Dyne creates a new version of J.A.R.V.I.S. to be a helpmate to Edwin Jarvis. When Jarvis thought it was a sign for him to retire, J.A.R.V.I.S. stated that its programming is not yet complete.

== In other media ==
=== Film ===
- J.A.R.V.I.S. appears in Iron Man: Rise of Technovore, voiced by Troy Baker.
- J.A.R.V.I.S. appears in the Heroes United films Heroes United: Iron Man and Hulk and Heroes United: Iron Man & Captain America, voiced by David Kaye.

=== Television ===
- J.A.R.V.I.S. appears in Iron Man: Armored Adventures, voiced by Michael Adamthwaite. This version is the Extremis operating system for Andros Stark, the Iron Man of 2099.
- J.A.R.V.I.S. appears in The Avengers: Earth's Mightiest Heroes, voiced by Phil LaMarr. This version is Tony Stark's AI for the Iron Man armor, Stark Industries, and the Avengers Mansion.
- J.A.R.V.I.S. appears in Ultimate Spider-Man, voiced again by Phil LaMarr in "Flight of the Iron Spider" and by David Kaye in "The Avenging Spider-Man".
- J.A.R.V.I.S. appears in Avengers Assemble, voiced by David Kaye.
- J.A.R.V.I.S. appears in Marvel Super Hero Adventures: Frost Fight!, voiced by Trevor Devall.
- J.A.R.V.I.S. appears in Marvel Disk Wars: The Avengers, voiced by Yasuyuki Kase in Japanese and Robin Atkin Downes in English.
- J.A.R.V.I.S. appears in the Marvel Cinematic Universe animated series What If...?, voiced again by Paul Bettany.
- J.A.R.V.I.S. appears in the first two episodes of VisionQuest, a live action marvel series, voiced by James D'Arcy.

=== Video games ===
- J.A.R.V.I.S. appears in the 2008 Iron Man film tie-in game, voiced by Gillon Stephenson.
- J.A.R.V.I.S. appears in the Iron Man 2 film tie-in game, voiced by Andrew Chaikin.
- J.A.R.V.I.S. appears in Iron Man 3: The Official Game, voiced by Jeff Bottoms.
- J.A.R.V.I.S. appears in Lego Marvel Super Heroes, voiced by Troy Baker.
- J.A.R.V.I.S. appears in Disney Infinity 3.0, voiced again by David Kaye.
- J.A.R.V.I.S. appears in Lego Marvel's Avengers.
- J.A.R.V.I.S. appears in Marvel's Avengers, voiced by Harry Hadden-Paton.

=== Miscellaneous ===
J.A.R.V.I.S. appears in the "Black Widow" segment of Marvel's Wastelanders, voiced by David Cale.

== See also ==
- List of fictional artificial intelligences
- Characters of the Marvel Cinematic Universe
