= Pepper Potts (Marvel Cinematic Universe) =

Character in the Marvel Cinematic Universe

- Marvel Cinematic Universe character
- Gwyneth Paltrow as Pepper Potts in the 2008 film Iron Man
- First appearance: Iron Man (2008)
- Last appearance: Avengers: Endgame (2019)
- Based on: Pepper Potts by: Stan Lee; Robert Bernstein; Don Heck
- Adapted by: Mark Fergus Hawk Ostby; Art Marcum Matt Holloway
- Portrayed by: Gwyneth Paltrow

In-universe information
- Full name: Virginia Potts
- Alias: Rescue
- Occupation: CEO of Stark Industries; Personal assistant
- Affiliation: Stark Industries
- Spouse: Tony Stark †
- Children: Morgan Stark (daughter)
- Nationality: American

Virginia "Pepper" Potts is a fictional character in the Marvel Cinematic Universe based on the Marvel Comics character of the same name. Portrayed by Gwyneth Paltrow, she is depicted as Tony Stark's personal assistant and later his love interest, ultimately becoming his wife. In later installments in the MCU, Pepper takes over operation of his company, Stark Industries, as Stark moves on to focus on serving as Iron Man. In later films, Potts assists Stark and the Avengers with her own powered suit Rescue.

As of 2022, Potts has appeared in seven films, most recently in Avengers: Endgame (2019). Alternate versions of Potts also appear in the animated series What If...? (2021).

== Concept and creation ==
Virginia "Pepper" Potts first appeared in Tales of Suspense #45 (September 1963), which was written by Robert Bernstein with a story plot by Stan Lee and illustrated by Don Heck. Though she was named Pepper Potts from the start, Tony Stark addresses her as "Kitty" in one panel, which is thought to be a typo. Heck modeled Potts as Ann B. Davis' character of Schultzy from The Bob Cummings Show, and she was rendered with brown hair done up in a hairdo similar to Schultzy's. An unknown worker on the creative team or in editorial opined that the resemblance was too great, and in Tales of Suspense #50, Potts' look was altered to give her red hair and a different hairdo.

During early development around a film based on Iron Man at New Line Cinema, filmmakers juggled between using Pepper Potts or Bethany Cabe as Tony Stark's love interest before settling on Cabe. However, the film rights later reverted back to Marvel by 2005, and the fledgling Marvel Studios decided to redevelop the film from scratch as their first independent feature. Actress Gwyneth Paltrow was cast to play Pepper in Iron Man opposite Robert Downey Jr. as Tony Stark / Iron Man. She first received a call from director Jon Favreau and was eager to return to acting after taking care of her infant children, opting to work on an "inspiring film". She was unfamiliar with the Pepper Potts character, so she began reading Iron Man comics with pointers from Favreau and Marvel to prepare for the film, taking note of the character's attire, mannerisms, and hairstyles over the years.

== Characterization ==
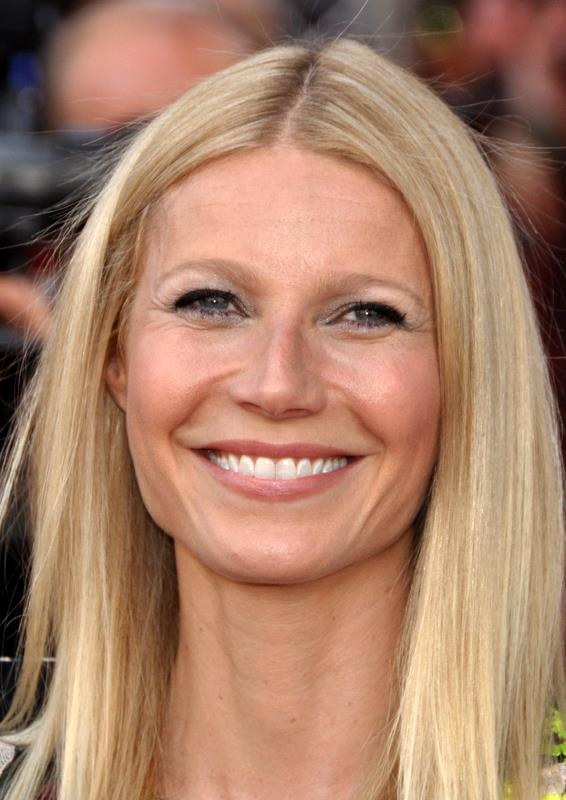
Gwyneth Paltrow at the French premiere of Iron Man 3 in 2013

In Iron Man (2008), Potts is Tony Stark's personal assistant and budding love interest. Paltrow asked Marvel to send her any comics they would consider relevant to her understanding of the character, whom she considered to be very smart, level-headed, and grounded. She said she liked "the fact that there's a sexuality that's not blatant." Favreau wanted Potts' and Stark's relationship to be reminiscent of a 1940s comedy, something which Paltrow considered to be fun in an "innocent yet sexy" way.

On her character's promotion to CEO of Stark Industries in Iron Man 2 (2010), Paltrow opined, "When we start Iron Man 2 Pepper and Tony are very much in the same vibe... as the movie progresses, Pepper is given more responsibility and she's promoted and it's nice to see her sort of grow up in that way. I think it really suits her, the job fits her really well."

Of Potts' relationship with Tony Stark in Iron Man 3 (2013), Paltrow said, "[She still] adores Tony, but she absolutely gets fed up with him. He gets caught in a feedback loop." Marvel Studios President Kevin Feige commented on Potts' role in the film: "The love triangle in this movie is really between Tony, Pepper and the suits. Tony, Pepper and his obsession with those suits, and the obsession with technology." Feige also stated the film uses the character to play with the damsel in distress trope, and posits the question, "Is Pepper in danger or is Pepper the savior?"

== Fictional character biography ==
=== Early career ===
Virginia Potts had worked her way up the corporate ladder after starting off as an accounting major and model before beginning to work office jobs, leading to encounters with Aldrich Killian, whose romantic interest she spurns repeatedly. (Note: As mentioned in Iron Man 3 (2013).) Potts eventually gets hired at Stark Industries as an administrative assistant. She later confronts CEO Tony Stark with one of her findings, and when security attempts to remove her, she counters by claiming she had pepper spray, impressing Stark. (Note: As established in the official novelization of Iron Man (2008).)

=== Assistant at Stark Industries ===
Potts later becomes Stark's personal assistant, earning the nickname "Pepper". She often runs errands for him at work and picks up after him while he lives a playboy lifestyle. She is devastated when Stark is abducted in Afghanistan during a business trip, but after he escapes and returns to the United States, Potts is among the first to greet him, tearfully embracing him. At Stark's request, Potts personally replaces the miniature arc reactor in his chest keeping shrapnel from piercing his heart, later saving the first reactor as a decoration for him with the insignia "Proof that Tony Stark has a heart".

As Potts and Stark begin to grow emotionally closer, she starts to worry for him as he begins to refocus from his original career in building weapons and missile technology to building armored suits powered by his reactor for the purpose of vigilante activity. Unwilling to see Stark get into further danger, Potts later offers her resignation, which Stark rejects, stating she is his "only friend" left at Stark Industries as he starts to question the motives of his colleagues such as Obadiah Stane. Potts relents and has a conversation with Stane to gauge whether Stark's suspicions are true, discovering that Stane had ordered the assassination attempt on Stark. When Stane steals Tony's reactor to power his Iron Monger suit and wreak havoc, he attacks Potts and several other Stark Industries personnel before they can report Stane to S.H.I.E.L.D. agent Phil Coulson. Tony locates his original, albeit depleted reactor, allowing him to survive and fight Stane, though he is outmatched due to his depleted power level. The fight carries Stark and Stane to the top of the Stark Industries building, and Stark instructs Potts to overload the large arc reactor powering the building. This unleashes a massive electrical surge that causes Stane and his armor to fall into the exploding reactor, killing him. The next day, at a press conference, Potts and other aides help Stark get ready and advise him to tell a fabricated story, but Stark publicly admits to being the superhero the press has dubbed "Iron Man".

=== Promotion to CEO and early romance with Tony Stark ===
Potts is later promoted to CEO of Stark Industries as Stark steps down and hires Natasha Rushman to replace her as his personal assistant. Potts helps him and the company deal with rival businessman Justin Hammer. As Stark discovers that the palladium reactor is slowly killing him, he starts to act recklessly, causing problems between him and Potts. Stark later encounters Nick Fury, who reveals Rushman is actually a S.H.I.E.L.D. agent named Natasha Romanoff, also known as Black Widow, and attempts to get him to join the Avengers after providing information from Stark's father, Howard, on a new, non-toxic element for his reactor.

Stark tries to apologize to Potts for his previous erratic behavior, but she brushes him aside as she helps him prepare for an expo, which sees Hammer create his own War Machine armor after James Rhodes takes Stark's Mark II armor for the U.S. military to be worked on by contractors. When Ivan Vanko attacks the expo, Potts and Happy Hogan confront Hammer after it is revealed he worked with Vanko. Stark and Rhodes team up and defeat Vanko, but the latter tries to destroy the expo by blowing himself up with explosives. Stark rescues Potts from the resulting explosions, and she discovers that Stark was dying until building his new, non-toxic arc reactor. Overcome with stress, Potts initially quits before she and Stark passionately kiss for the first time, revealing their feelings for each other.

Potts ultimately remains CEO of Stark Industries and starts dating Stark as the company completes a new skyscraper in New York City. As the couple puts finishing touches on the tower's electric supply during a romantic evening, Coulson interrupts them, reminding Stark of the Avengers initiative. Potts encourages Stark to help Coulson and S.H.I.E.L.D., cutting short their date while she leaves to oversee three more Stark Industries buildings. By the time Stark and the other Avengers have engaged in a battle with Loki and his Chitauri army, Stark tries to video call Potts as he redirects a missile launched by the U.S. Air Force to the Chitauri mothership, realizing he may not survive, but Potts does not pick up as she is preoccupied watching the news report. Stark survives the battle as the Avengers defeat and extradite Loki back to Asgard, and Potts and Stark start planning renovations to the battle-damaged Stark Tower.

=== Dealing with the "Mandarin" and Extremis ===
Months later, Aldrich Killian visits Stark Industries and pitches his company's serum Extremis, trying to get Potts and the company to join him or invest in his concept, but Potts declines. Returning home, Potts encounters Stark acting erratically, but he confides to her that he has been experiencing post traumatic stress disorder since the Battle of New York. After the "Mandarin" claims credit for an explosion at the Stark facility that injures Stark head of security Happy Hogan, Stark challenges the Mandarin to face him, after which the Stark mansion is attacked by armed helicopters while Pepper meets with Maya Hansen. Stark saves Pepper but falls into the ocean along with the rubble. Potts is initially devastated but is relieved to find out Tony survived the attack and escaped.

Hansen tells Potts that Killian intends to sell Extremis to the Mandarin. However, after they find refuge in a hotel, Hansen turns Potts over to Killian, who attempts to blackmail Stark into working with him to stabilize the serum by kidnapping and experimenting on Pepper, injecting her with it. After seeing Potts's pain, Hansen attempts to free her but is killed by Killian, who has already taken the Extremis serum. As Stark is forced to watch a video of Potts struggling, he manages to arrive at her holding area after rescuing the President of the United States. In the ensuing battle between Stark and Killian, Potts appears to fall to her death, but survives due to her newly-gained Extremis abilities. She ambushes Killian after he brushes off a missile attack from Stark and declares himself as the "true" Mandarin, helping Stark defeat and kill Killian. Afterward, Stark promises to spend more time with Pepper and cure her from the Extremis serum, discarding his arc reactor.

=== Hiatus and relationship issues ===
In 2015, Potts has increased her role in Stark Industries, she attended the annual NYC Tech convention to speak on behalf of Stark, and was therefore unable to attend the Avengers' party.

In 2016, Stark began devoting all of his time towards upkeeping the Avengers and at the Avengers Compound, Potts and Stark decided to take a break from their relationship. She cancels an appearance at a convention alongside Stark.

A few months later, Potts and Stark rekindled their relationship. Stark asks Potts to arrange a press conference in the Avengers Compound in upstate New York where they would announce Spider-Man, his new protégé, as the newest member of the Avengers. Parker respectfully declines the invitation and leaves. Stark then asks Hogan for a ring and proposes to her publicly at the press conference.

=== Marriage to Stark and The Blip ===
In 2018, while jogging in Central Park, Stark tells Potts about a dream he had where they had a child named Morgan after Pott's uncle. During the conversation, they are interrupted by the arrival of Stephen Strange and Bruce Banner, who warn them about Thanos' conquest. Later, Potts contacts Stark while he is aboard one of Thanos' ships. She pleads with Stark to get off the ship and come back to Earth until he loses Pott's signal.

Potts survives the Blip, Potts went to the Avengers Compound and along with the other-Avengers witnessed Carol Danvers' arrival, carrying the Benatar with nearly depleted Stark. Potts and the Avengers brought Stark inside where he collapses of exhaustion and malnourishment.

=== Birth of Morgan and Stark's death ===
Within the five years, Potts and Stark get married, and goes on to have a daughter named Morgan. In 2023, Romanoff, Steve Rogers and Scott Lang visit Stark to seek his help in building a time machine to undo the Blip, Potts encourages Stark to work on the problem. After securing the Infinity Stones, the Avengers undo the Blip, although an alternate version of Thanos arrives through the time machine and attacks the Avengers Compound. Potts joins the battle, arriving in her own armored suit to battle Thanos' army along with the revived heroes. Stark grabs the Stones and uses them to disintegrate Thanos and his army, but the strain of using the Stones kills him. Later, a funeral is held for Stark, with Potts, Morgan, Hogan, Rhodes, the remaining members of the Avengers and their allies in attendance.

Following Stark's death, Potts engages in philanthropy, donating money on behalf of Stark Industries to a fund for people displaced from their homes by the Blip. (Note: As mentioned in Spider-Man: Far From Home (2019).)

== Alternate versions ==
An alternate version of Potts appears in two episodes of the animated series, What If...?, voiced by Beth Hoyt.

=== Wakandan–American war ===
In an alternate 2010, Killmonger rescues Tony Stark, preventing his capture by the Ten Rings, but then betrays and murders Stark, and engineers an American invasion of Wakanda. Shuri realizes this deception and brings evidence of it to Potts, who then returns in the first season finale, "What If... the Watcher Broke His Oath?", where she helps Shuri and the Dora Milaje storm Killmonger's palace to capture him, only to find him gone, as Killmonger has been secretly recruited by the Watcher to help save the Multiverse.

== Reception ==
Paltrow's performance as Pepper Potts and Potts' character have been mostly praised by critics. Kirk Honeycutt of The Hollywood Reporter praised the writing of the character in Iron Man, writing "Alongside Gwyneth Paltrow's Pepper Potts, whose own svelte lines cannot be improved on". David Edelstein of New York Magazine crudely described the presence of the female leads in Iron Man 2 as "a gam-off between Gwyneth Paltrow and Scarlett Johansson in which Paltrow wins on length and then disappears in the glare of her opponent's headlights".

David Denby of The New Yorker gave a negative review, claiming "a slightly depressed, going-through-the-motions feel to the entire show ... Gwyneth Paltrow, widening her eyes and palpitating, can't do much with an antique role as Stark's girl Friday, who loves him but can't say so".

=== Accolades ===
Year	Film	Award	Category	Result	Ref(s)
2008	Iron Man	Teen Choice Awards	Choice Movie Actress: Action	Nominated	
2008	Iron Man	Scream Awards	Best Science Fiction Actress	Nominated	
2008	Iron Man	Saturn Awards	Best Actress	Nominated	
2010	Iron Man 2	Teen Choice Awards	Choice Movie Actress: Sci-Fi	Nominated	
2010	Iron Man 2	Scream Awards	Best Science Fiction Actress	Nominated	
2013	Iron Man 3	Teen Choice Awards	Choice Movie Actress: Action	Nominated	
2013	Iron Man 3	Teen Choice Awards	Choice Movie Actress: Sci-Fi/Fantasy	Nominated	
2014	Iron Man 3	Critics' Choice Movie Awards	Best Actress in an Action Movie	Nominated	
2014	Iron Man 3	People's Choice Awards	Favorite Movie Actress	Nominated	
2014	Iron Man 3	People's Choice Awards	Favorite Movie Duo (with Robert Downey Jr.)	Nominated	

== See also ==
- Characters of the Marvel Cinematic Universe
