= Edwin Jarvis =

Character in Marvel Comics

- Edwin Jarvis. Art by Jim Cheung.

Publication information
- Publisher: Marvel Comics
- First appearance: Tales of Suspense #59 (Nov. 1964)
- Created by: Stan Lee (writer); Jack Kirby (artist)

In-story information
- Full name: Edwin Jarvis
- Supporting character of: Iron Man
- Notable aliases: Crimson Cowl
- Abilities: Trained hand-to-hand combatant

Edwin Jarvis is a fictional character appearing in American comic books published by Marvel Comics. Jarvis is most often depicted as a supporting character in the titles Iron Man and The Avengers. He is the loyal household butler of the Stark family. Since the 1990s, the character has appeared heavily in media adaptations of Iron Man and Avengers stories.

In the Marvel Cinematic Universe, the character serves as the basis for an artificial intelligence known as J.A.R.V.I.S. voiced by Paul Bettany, while Edwin Jarvis himself was portrayed by James D'Arcy in the ABC television series Agent Carter (2015-2016), the film Avengers: Endgame (2019), and the Disney+ series What If...? (2024) and VisionQuest (2026).

== Publication history ==
Jarvis first appeared in Tales of Suspense #59 (Nov. 1964), and was created by Stan Lee and Jack Kirby. Jarvis received an entry in the Official Mightiest Heroes! from an Avengers backup story featuring Jarvis.

== Fictional character biography ==
=== Backstory ===
Edwin Jarvis served in the Royal Air Service during World War II and was its champion boxer three years running. He later moved to the United States, where he became manservant to Howard Stark and Maria Stark and watched over the Starks' mansion even after their deaths.

=== Avengers ===
When Iron Man (Tony Stark) calls the Avengers' first meeting and donates the Stark house as the Avengers Mansion headquarters, Jarvis serves the Avengers for many years thereafter, acting as a father figure to some of the newcomers.

Jarvis spent some time as the primary babysitter for Franklin Richards, the super-powered son of Mister Fantastic and the Invisible Woman, when the two Fantastic Four members were residing at the mansion. Jarvis once started a pen pal relationship with a young girl who would grow up to be the superhero Silverclaw; it was later revealed that the orphanage, aware of Silverclaw's abilities and Jarvis's ties to the Avengers, chose to assign him as Silverclaw's sponsor in the hope that his ties to the Avengers could be useful. Silverclaw has referred to Jarvis as an uncle, with Avengers such as Janet van Dyne noting that Silverclaw's ties to Jarvis made the girl practically family.

Jarvis has also been personally involved in many the Avengers' exploits, including being Ultron's brainwashed decoy as the Crimson Cowl, and leading the evacuation of a stalled subway train during a citywide disaster and battling a demonically possessed car. During an attack by the Masters of Evil, Jarvis is brutally beaten by Mister Hyde. Jarvis is left with a shattered knee and 90% loss of vision in his left eye, forcing him to wear an eyepatch for some time. However, he refuses to retire, believing instead that confronting his fears gave him more in common with the Avengers.

=== The New Avengers ===
When the New Avengers are formed, Jarvis is called back after taking a holiday "for the first time in years", having been informed that his services were once again needed. Jarvis seemingly struck up a relationship with May Parker, who had moved into Stark Tower with Peter Parker and Mary Jane Watson after her house burned down. In the 2008 storyline One More Day, Jarvis is given over $2,000,000 by Stark to pay for May's hospital bills after she is injured in an assassination attempt on Peter.

=== Secret Invasion ===
During the Secret Invasion storyline, Jarvis is secretly replaced by a Skrull agent. Jarvis later approaches Maria Hill on the destroyed S.H.I.E.L.D. Helicarrier in the middle of the ocean and tells her to surrender along with the S.H.I.E.L.D. crew. Hill uses a Life Model Decoy as a distraction while she escapes and detonates the S.H.I.E.L.D. Helicarrier. During the fight between Veranke and Criti Noll's forces against the heroes and villains, it is revealed that Jarvis has abducted Jessica Jones and Luke Cage's baby daughter Danielle. After the final battle, the real Jarvis is discovered alive, prompting Jones to discover that her baby had been taken by the Skrull impostor. Jarvis's Skrull impersonator is later killed by Bullseye while Cage rescues Danielle.

=== AXIS ===
During the AXIS storyline, when key members of the Avengers and the X-Men undergo a moral inversion, Jarvis and the Hulk try to stop the Avengers from killing the Red Skull, but are ignored and attacked. Jarvis is knocked aside while Hulk is inverted as well and becomes Kluh. However, Jarvis had anticipated a problem based on the Avengers' actions since the group's return from the island, and had already hidden Red Skull away until he could explain the situation to Steve Rogers.

=== All-New, All-Different Marvel ===
As part of the All-New, All-Different Marvel, Edwin Jarvis is welcomed to the new headquarters of the Avengers. When Jarvis wonders if his services are needed or not, Iron Man convinces him to help out the Avengers. Jarvis is present with the Avengers when they meet Nadia Pym, Hank Pym's daughter, who now sports a modified Wasp suit. After Nadia helps to stabilize Vision, Jarvis takes Nadia on a road trip to meet her extended family.

=== Contest of Champions ===
When the Earth and Moon are dragged into the Challenger's battle with the Grandmaster, Jarvis is almost killed saving a child from a crumbling building. Jarvis barely survives and is rendered comatose. After Beast and Nadia save his life, Jarvis reveals that he has no true memory of the existence of the heroine Voyager. This leads to the revelation that Voyager is the Grandmaster's daughter and had been manipulating the Avengers' members, creating the illusion that she was one of the original Avengers members.

=== Establishing the Jarvis Lounge ===
With help from Wasp, Edwin Jarvis renovates Vernon Van Dyne's old penthouse, which is renamed the Jarvis Lounge. The Jarvis Lounge becomes a VIP place for the Avengers as well as a base, a bar, and a lounge. At the Jarvis Lounge, Edwin Jarvis is visited by Toy Soldier, who seeks to join the Avengers.

== Abilities ==
Edwin Jarvis is skilled at self-defense and basic hand-to-hand combat. He was a former boxing champion of the Royal Air Force for three years and had received military combat training and personal tutelage in unarmed combat by Captain America. Although he is in good health and physical condition, past injuries inflicted by Mister Hyde may have hampered his fighting prowess.

== Reception ==
In 2012, Edwin Jarvis was ranked 25th in IGN's list of "The Top 50 Avengers".

== Other versions ==
=== Earth-14325 ===
On Earth-14325, Edwin Jarvis is a resentful butler who killed Howard Stark and his baby son Tony, then took the Iron Man armor and joined the Avengers as Iron Monger. After Earth-14325 is destroyed in an incursion, Iron Monger and the Avengers are saved by A.I.M. and transported to Earth-616. After a fight with the Avengers of Earth-616, A.I.M. offers to have the Avengers of Earth-14325 be sent to Earth-83292, where there are no Avengers for them to fight.

=== Marvel Adventures ===
An alternate universe version of Edwin Jarvis appears in the series "Marvel Adventures".

=== Marvel Apes ===
In the "Marvel Apes" reality, Edwin Jarvis is a chimpanzee who is the butler of Iron Mandrill.

=== Marvel Noir ===
An alternate universe version of Edwin Jarvis appears in the "Marvel Noir" reality.

=== Marvel Zombies ===
An alternate universe version of Edwin Jarvis appears in Marvel Zombies: Dead Days, where he is killed by the zombified Avengers.

=== MC2 ===
An alternate universe version of Edwin Jarvis appears in the MC2 universe, where he acts as a mentor to the young heroes.

=== Spider-Ham ===
In the "Spider-Ham" reality, Edwin Jarvis' counterpart is a walrus named Walvis.

=== Ultimate Marvel ===
The Ultimate Marvel version of Edwin Jarvis is different from his original version where he was older and was much more sarcastic and acerbic towards his employer Iron Man (Tony Stark). Jarvis was only Iron Man's personal butler. While Tony dated and became engaged to Natasha Romanov, Jarvis was shown to be continuously at odds with Romanov, who is later revealed to be a traitor and kills him.

== In other media ==
=== Television ===
- Edwin Jarvis appears in the "Captain America" segment of The Marvel Super Heroes, voiced by Vernon Chapman.
- Edwin Jarvis appears in The Avengers: United They Stand, voiced by Graham Harley.

=== Marvel Cinematic Universe ===
Edwin Jarvis appears in media set in the Marvel Cinematic Universe (MCU), portrayed by James D'Arcy.

- First appearing in the live-action TV series Agent Carter, this version is Howard Stark's butler, Peggy Carter's assistant on Strategic Scientific Reserve (SSR) missions, and the inspiration for the J.A.R.V.I.S. A.I.
- An alternate timeline variant of Jarvis makes a cameo appearance in the live-action film Avengers: Endgame (2019).
- An alternate universe variant of Jarvis appears in the animated series What If...? episode "What If... Agatha Went to Hollywood?", voiced by James D'Arcy.

=== Film ===
- Edwin Jarvis appears in Ultimate Avengers, voiced by Fred Tatasciore.
- Edwin Jarvis appears in Ultimate Avengers 2, voiced again by Fred Tatasciore.

=== Video games ===
- Edwin Jarvis appears in Marvel: Ultimate Alliance, voiced by Philip Proctor.
- Edwin Jarvis appears in Marvel Heroes, voiced by Enn Reitel.
