= The Embassy Visual Effects =

Canadian VFX company

The Embassy Visual Effects Inc.
- Company type: Private
- Industry: Visual effects
- Founded: 2002
- Headquarters: 177 West 7th Ave, Vancouver, British Columbia, Canada
- Number of locations: 2
- Website: theembassyvfx.com

The Embassy is a visual effects studio located in Vancouver, British Columbia, Canada. The Embassy is known for its photo-realistic visual effects work on commercials and more recently, features. The studio completed a number of visual effects shots for Marvel Studios, Iron Man and more recently contributed effects to the climactic sequence of the Peter Jackson produced film, District 9. The Embassy's visual effects work on District 9 was nominated for an Academy Award.

The Embassy is most famous for a series of commercials created for French automobile maker, Citroën. The commercials feature a computer generated car which transforms into a robot. The visual effects created for the first Citroën commercial were the subject of a promotional campaign by Apple Inc., promoting the use of its compositing software, Shake.

The Embassy has also worked on advertising campaigns for Nike, Mercedes-Benz, Chevrolet and GMC.
