= Iron Man 3: The Official Game =

2013 video game

Iron Man 3
- Developer: Gameloft
- Publisher: Gameloft
- Writer: Christos Gage
- Platforms: iOS, Android
- Release: April 25, 2013
- Genre: Endless runner
- Mode: Single-player

Iron Man 3: The Official Game is a mobile phone video game developed and published by Gameloft. The game was released on April 25, 2013, and is based on the film Iron Man 3. As of 2017 it is now discontinued and not supported by Gameloft. The game is an endless runner, where the player attempts to dodge objects to score points and complete the level and defeat villains from the Marvel Cinematic Universe (MCU). The game received mixed reviews, with critics praising the core premise, but criticizing the game's excessive in-app purchases and freemium-based time restrictions.

== Gameplay ==
The game plays as an endless runner, similar to the game Temple Run. The game is played both in 3D space behind the character, and while flying, without platforming elements.

The player controls Tony Stark in his Iron Man armor, maneuvering him through the game's various locations. Swiping the touchscreen moves the character, while tapping on characters results in shooting projectiles at enemies. For later devices with an orientation gyro, the game was updated to include gyro sensitivity features for moving Iron Man across the screen. This freed up player screen tapping to focus solely on offensive maneuvers. Levels are randomly generated and play out infinitely, until the player suffers enough damage to KO the character. Damage is suffered from flying human and droid enemies, from running into buildings and other obstacles, from crashing into jets, or from missile fire. A later space location added plasma missiles and asteroids to the list of obstacles to be avoided.

Missions, typically consisting of eliminating a certain number of enemies, or collecting a certain number of items, will reward the player with in-game currency to buy upgrades in weapons or armor. Alternatively, the player may choose to use real money to make in-app purchases. If armor incurs too much damage, the player must start over. There was originally a 30-second real time waiting period (longer for some more advanced armors) that would occur while Iron Man's "armor repaired itself". This restriction was removed in later updates of the game.

The game initially offered 18 variations of Iron Man's armor to customize the player character, with another two being added in an update. Further updates added even more armors, with the armors divided into categories based on their special moves. Several Iron Man villains appear in the game as well, particularly Crimson Dynamo and M.O.D.O.K.

== Plot ==
Following the events of Iron Man 3, Tony Stark discovers that A.I.M. is still around and still causing trouble. He wonders who could be running them with Killian gone. He soon discovers that the Crimson Dynamo, Living Laser, and Ezekiel Stane are controlling major operations within A.I.M. However, it proves to be M.O.D.O.K. that is the true mastermind behind A.I.M.'s latest attacks. After a few humiliating defeats, M.O.D.O.K. upgrades his body and makes copies of his consciousness to numerous networks, ensuring that he can always resurrect himself in a new body if ever destroyed in battle. Stane reveals his identity to Tony, and vows revenge for Tony's refusal to hand over Stark Industries willingly.

As time goes by, Tony rebuilds Rhodey's War Machine armors (including the Iron Patriot) so that he may have some assistance in taking out A.I.M. The ploy proves useful, as Stane kidnaps Pepper and reveals A.I.M.'s plan to take over Stark Industries' network. Tony succeeds in defeating Crimson Dynamo, Living Laser and Stane. Rhodey uses the diversion Tony provides by fighting Stane as an opportunity to rescue Pepper before she is electrocuted to death.

M.O.D.O.K., later attacks again, revealing himself to be Aldrich Killian's consciousness downloaded by A.I.M. and now obsessed with downloading his mind into newer bodies and networks. Tony defeats M.O.D.O.K., but he fails to stop him from downloading himself into the Stark Industries mainframe. Tony manages to physically destroy the Stark Industries network, trapping M.O.D.O.K. 3.0 in the old network and forcing M.O.D.O.K. and A.I.M. to destroyed. Fearing they will try again, Tony decides to declare the old Stark Industries network permanently defunct. He comes up with plans to develop a safer network that would prove a lot harder for A.I.M. to hack into, dubbing it "Stark Resilient".

== Development ==
The game was first announced by Gameloft in March 2013.

== Reception ==
Reception

Aggregate score
Aggregator	Score
Metacritic	58/100

Review scores
Publication	Score
Game Informer	6.5/10
TouchArcade	3/5

The game has received a rating of 58/100 from aggregator website Metacritic, based on 18 reviews, indicating mixed reviews. USA Today classified the game as "not bad -- but not excellent either", praising the core gameplay, but complaining that the in-app purchases were unfairly priced and burdened progression, and that characters did not accurately reflect their film counterparts. Game Informer echoed these sentiments, stating that they "appreciate how the random levels make each play-through feel different, and Tony's banter... but I would have enjoyed Iron Man 3 more if it didn't artificially limit my access to Iron Man's best gear in a cheap attempt to reach into my piggy bank. If you're a fan of endless runners and can put up with the game constantly asking you to post to Facebook or purchase more ISO-8, then you might find this a fun diversion while you wait in line to see Iron Man 3 in theaters."

Gamezebo praised the graphics, calling it one of the "best-looking iOS games to have come out in the past year", but criticized the original release's 30-second wait before starting a new game, calling it "a rather shady freemium gimmick". Digital Spy referred to it as "decent enough", recommending it mostly for Iron Man and comic book fans. Slide to Play referred to the game as initially fun, but that as the game progressed, "...certain obstacles feel ridiculously difficult to dodge– almost as though the game is tired of you playing". TouchArcade criticized the graphics, stating that, while nice, created input lag, even without much action present on the screen, and that it doesn't feel as finished as other Gameloft games. Technology Tell felt that the cost of the in-game purchases, and excessive wait time, would be a hurdle many would not be able to overlook.
