= Ultimo (Marvel Comics) =

Fictional giant robot

- Ultimo

Publication information
- Publisher: Marvel Comics
- First appearance: Cameo: Tales of Suspense #76 (April 1966); Full: Tales of Suspense #77 (May 1966)
- Created by: Stan Lee (writer); Gene Colan (artist)

In-story information
- Species: Robot
- Team affiliations: Mandarin's Minions
- Notable aliases: The Living Holocaust; Doomsday Machine
- Abilities: Superhuman strength, stamina, durability, and speed; Energy manipulation; Kinetic growth; Self-repair; Metal morphing

Ultimo (Note: /ˈʌltɪmoʊ/) is a character appearing in American comic books published by Marvel Comics. Created by writer Stan Lee and artist Gene Colan, the character first appeared in Tales of Suspense #76 (April 1966). Ultimo is a humanoid android, ranging in height from 25 to 60 feet, with immense destructive power. After crash-landing on Earth, Ultimo remains dormant for several years until the Mandarin discovers and reprograms him. Initially serving as a powerful weapon for the Mandarin, Ultimo has the ability to absorb unlimited energy and adapt to any environment. His strength is so formidable that it took the combined efforts of the Avengers and other heroes to defeat him.

== Publication history ==
Ultimo made his cameo appearance in Tales of Suspense #76 (April 1966), with his first full appearance in Tales of Suspense #77 (May 1966), created by writer Stan Lee and artist Gene Colan. He subsequently appeared in several Marvel series, including Iron Man (1968), Iron Man (1998), and Avengers: The Initiative (2007).

== Fictional character biography ==
=== Origin ===
Ultimo is a gigantic ancient android of unknown origin who is believed to have been created by an alien race as a doomsday device. Ultimo himself once confirmed that his "masters" had not contacted him in "thousands of years", suggesting that he was unaware of his culpability for their demise.

In the 1840s, Ultimo is traveling through space when he attacks the planet Rajak after perceiving it as a threat, ultimately killing all its people. The only survivors, a group of Rajakian merchants who were off planet at the time, lure Ultimo into an asteroid belt, disable him, and allow him to crash-land on Earth.

=== First appearance ===
The Mandarin later discovers Ultimo in a dormant volcano in China and reprograms him as a servant. Ultimo vanquishes a force of Chinese soldiers sent to dispatch the Mandarin and nearly destroys Iron Man, but is drawn back into the volcano. The volcano has been destabilized by his activity and erupts, swallowing the robot whole in a conflagration of red-hot lava. This proved not to be enough to destroy him, however.

Ultimo is then sent by the Mandarin to assist the Living Laser who was attacking Africa, and battled Thor and Hawkeye after emerging from a volcano. He was able to separate Thor from Mjolnir, but Hawkeye distracted him long enough for Blake to transform back to Thor, after which Ultimo was knocked into the volcano, which Thor closed. Ultimo was then sent by the Mandarin to attack the Yellow Claw and Loc Do, and battled Iron Man and Sunfire. Ultimo was next sent by the Mandarin to attack Washington, D.C. Ultimo fights both Iron Man and the rest of the Avengers, even on the Capitol Mall, before finally being dumped in yet another volcano. He is not heard from for years after that, until he's revealed to be the cause for a series of earth tremors in California. Over the years, he has drifted across the entire length of the continental plate, absorbing geothermal energy to power himself. The then-current version of Iron Man (the remote-controlled NTU-150) proves no match for Ultimo, and is torn to pieces — and the cybernetic backlash to the nervous system renders Tony Stark comatose.

=== Ultimo versus Iron Legion ===
Ultimo battled the "Iron Legion" which was led by War Machine (Jim Rhodes) and furthermore comprised Happy Hogan, Eddie March (in Iron Man's gray, original suit), Bethany Cabe, Mike O'Brien (in Iron Man's Silver Centurion suit) and Carl Walker (in Iron Man's "classic" armor); Tony was down and Rhodes had Abe Zimmer take Iron Man's old armors out of storage to be nominally functional again. Since Iron Man's armors would not function anywhere near capacity (having been stored for sentimental reasons only with the idea of never being used again), Rhodes decided on a change of plan against Ultimo. While Happy gets Carl and Eddie to the hospital, and Bethany and Mike head to the town of Futura to start evacuations, Bethany convinced Rhodes to allow them to buy time against Ultimo together. At this point, Tony came out of a coma and donned the new Modular Iron Man suit. He headed out to aid in the fight against Ultimo with a Full-Spectrum Scanalyzer and Railgun Launcher. Iron Man successfully took out Ultimo single-handedly, by causing lightning to strike the robot's "central nervous system". Iron Man's scans indicated that Ultimo is several thousand years old, and has the robot hauled off for study.

=== Ultimate Devastation ===
Years later, Ultimo is taken into the custody of Stark-Fujikawa which had bought the Stark company when Tony Stark was believed dead (after the events of "the Crossing"). Having performed extensive research on Ultimo, Stark-Fujikawa's engineers manage to access its control programs, and company intend to use the enormous energy reserves stored inside Ultimo to provide cheap electricity to the entire Western United States.

The ship built on top of the dormant doomsday device is attacked by Goldenblade and Sapper — ironically, representatives of the doomed Rajaki race, seeking to steal energy to resurrect those Rajaki that still survive as data patterns aboard the crashed vessel - who accidentally wake up Ultimo, and the robot immediately sets out to destroy the ship. The city of Spokane is on his route, and will be destroyed unless he is stopped. Goldenblade, Sapper, the superheroine Warbird, S.H.I.E.L.D. and the US army all work together with Iron Man to slow the giant down, while Iron Man attempts to use what data Stark-Fujikawa's engineers managed to obtain to break into Ultimo's core programming once more. Moments before the city is reached, Tony convinces the robot of being one of his "Masters" and orders him to shut down. Ultimo is dismantled and his systems "fried" by the transfer of his energy stores to the Rajaki vessel.

=== Initiative ===
Ultimo reappeared, apparently fully restored, facing the Mighty Avengers. However, he is deactivated by a single shot from the Tactigon.

=== Ultimo virus ===
Ultimo is converted into an "Ultimo virus" capable of bestowing enhanced strength, speed, regeneration and optic blast abilities to its victims, which included Dr. Glenda Sandoval (Rhodey's former love interest) and Ares. It is revealed that the virus was engineered from Ultimo himself by the Human Engineering Life Laboratories, which was acting on the commission of the Stark Solutions corporation, which had been contracted by H.A.M.M.E.R. to study Ultimo's potential as a weapon. Having destroyed Ultimo's body, War Machine sets out to destroy Ultimo's brain, which had been split up into three discrete units stored at separate locations. Two of the units are destroyed by War Machine's allies, but the third is ingested in the form of a crystalline liquid by Stark Solutions' CEO Morgan Stark. Morgan is transformed into a giant, humanoid Ultimo and gains the original Ultimo's programming to destroy all life, fighting War Machine. However, Ultimo's third component is destroyed when War Machine uses Ultimo's own weapons technology against the robot. Morgan self-destructs, scattering Ultimo's liquid body all over the landscape and merging with the plant life. Ultimo/Morgan plans to convert all vegetation on Earth into metal which would suffocate all life within two weeks. War Machine renders Ultimo docile by forcing Norman Osborn into showing memories of respective happiest moments. However, Osborn takes advantage of this to take Ultimo for himself, turning Ultimo into a floating liquid metal ball with a blank mind. Before Osborn can take possession of the robot, War Machine requests that Cybermancer "raise" Ultimo, instilling other values into it besides genocide.

=== Iron Man 2020 ===
During the "Iron Man 2020" storyline, Ultimo attacks the island of Lingares. His attack brings him into conflict with Force Works and a group of Deathloks. It was revealed that MODOK Superior was responsible for Ultimo's rampage and the creation of the Deathloks of Lingares, and manipulated Force Works into taking out Ultimo's head so that he can take control of its body.

== Powers and abilities ==
Ultimo is programmed for destruction, targeting specific beings such as Iron Man and the Rajaki, but ultimately destroying all life in his path. He has minimal capacity for independent thought and no emotions beyond hatred. While he can be reprogrammed to serve various purposes by those who can access his circuitry, his core function remains the same. Ultimo possesses vast strength (Class 100) and durability, allowing him to withstand almost any form of injury, excluding a direct nuclear explosion. His stamina is virtually limitless, and his speed, agility, and reflexes are enhanced to superhuman levels. He can also fire beams of concussive force and disintegrating energy from his eyes. His eye beams were even powerful enough to prevent Thor's hammer from returning to him.

== In other media ==
=== Television ===
- Ultimo appears in the "Iron Man" segment of The Marvel Super Heroes.
- Ultimo appears in Iron Man, voiced by Ed Gilbert.
- Ultimo makes a cameo appearance in the Fantastic Four episode "The Silver Surfer and the Return of Galactus".
- Ultimo appears in Iron Man: Armored Adventures. This version was created by the original Mandarin to guard one of his Makluan rings and test potential successors' courage, and can grow in size when attacked.
- Ultimo makes a cameo appearance in The Avengers: Earth's Mightiest Heroes episode "Iron Man is Born".
- Ultimo appears in the Avengers Assemble episode "Building the Perfect Weapon".

=== Video games ===
- Ultimo appears as a mini-boss in Marvel: Ultimate Alliance. This version serves the Mandarin.
- Ultimo appears in the Iron Man 2 film tie-in game, voiced by Andrew Chaikin. This version is a large battle suit created by A.I.M. operative Kearson DeWitt, who created it by stealing and modifying an old version of J.A.R.V.I.S. and combining it with his PROTEAN project.
- Ultimo appears in Marvel Pinball's Iron Man table as its wizard mode.
- Ultimo appears as a boss in Marvel Ultimate Alliance 3: The Black Order, voiced by Jim Meskimen. Prior to the game, Iron Man defeated Ultimo and wiped its mind before storing it in a warehouse in New Jersey. In the present, Ultron uses the Mind Stone to possess Ultimo and wreak havoc on New York City until they are defeated by Scott Lang / Giant-Man and the Vision.
- Ultimo appears in Marvel's Deadpool VR, voiced by Dolph Lundgren.

=== Miscellaneous ===
Ultimo appears in the Marvel Cinematic Universe comic Captain America: Road to War. This version was created by Hydra using technology recovered from Ultron's destroyed sentries.
