= Blizzard (Marvel Comics) =

Marvel Comics character

Blizzard is the name of several fictional characters appearing in American comic books published by Marvel Comics, who are primarily enemies of Iron Man.

The Donnie Gill incarnation has had the most appearances, appearing in several forms of animated media and video games as well as a live-action incarnation in the Marvel Cinematic Universe TV series Agents of S.H.I.E.L.D., portrayed by Dylan Minnette, though the Gregor Shapanka and Randy Macklin incarnations have also appeared in animation.

== Publication history ==
Created by Stan Lee and Don Heck, the Gregor Shapanka version of Blizzard appeared as Jack Frost in Tales of Suspense #45 (Sept. 1963), and as Blizzard beginning in Iron Man #86 (May 1976). He was killed off in The Amazing Spider-Man Annual #20 (Nov. 1986).

The Donnie Gill incarnation of Blizzard first appeared in Iron Man #223 (Oct. 1987) and was created by David Michelinie and Bob Layton.

The Randy Macklin incarnation of Blizzard first appeared in the Marvel Holiday Special #2 (Jan. 1993) and was created by Sholly Fisch and Tom Morgan.

== Fictional character biographies ==
=== Gregor Shapanka ===
Blizzard

Publication information
- Publisher: Marvel Comics
- First appearance: As Jack Frost: Tales of Suspense #45 (Sept. 1963); As Blizzard: Iron Man #86 (May 1976)
- Created by: Jack Frost: Stan Lee; Don Heck; Blizzard: Bill Mantlo; George Tuska

In-story information
- Full name: Gregor Shapanka
- Species: Human
- Notable aliases: Jack Frost
- Abilities: Micro-circuited suit grants: Cold manipulation and projection

Gregor Shapanka is a Hungarian scientist obsessed with immortality, and decides that the study of cryonics is the first step towards his goal. Shapanka takes a job at Stark Industries to fund his research and attempts to steal directly from Tony Stark. After being caught and fired by Stark for trying to steal from his secret vault, Gregor creates a suit containing cold-generating devices and is dubbed by the newspapers as "Jack Frost." He attempts to raid Stark Industries where he captures Pepper Potts and Happy Hogan, but is defeated by Iron Man.

Several years later, Gregor Shapanka escaped prison and attacked Stark's Long Island industrial complex using a new far more powerful cold-generating battle suit and calling himself Blizzard. This time, Blizzard was out to steal Stark's climatron device which could be used to alter weather patterns. Blizzard nearly froze Iron Man to death, but Iron Man was rescued by Potts. Iron Man caused Blizzard's battle suit to short-circuit and then captured him.

Gregor Shapanka obtains financing for recreating his cold-generating costume from multimillionaire Justin Hammer. Blizzard forms a partnership with two other clients of Hammer, Blacklash and Melter. The three attack a hotel casino in Atlantic City, only to be defeated by Iron Man and private bodyguard Bethany Cabe.

Shortly thereafter, Shapanka reconstructs his cold suit in prison. When Electro uses his electrical powers to break out of the adjoining cell, Shapanka is caught in the blast and the suit is fused to his body. Electro and Blizzard then join forces to take over the Daily Bugle, but are stopped by Spider-Man and Daredevil.

Blizzard's body gains the ability to generate intense cold without artificial means. Feeling alienated from humanity, Shapanka (again calling himself Jack Frost) comes to live in an ice palace he created within a mountain. The Hulk finds Jack Frost's new home and destroys the ice palace. Frost is seemingly killed in the collapse of his domain.

Gregor Shapanka reappears in the guise of Blizzard. Somehow, Blizzard had lost his power to generate cold and once again needed his battle suit to create low temperatures. Shapanka returns to crime and forms a gang to aid him. However, upon robbing a bank in New York City, Blizzard and his henchmen are defeated by Spider-Man and taken into police custody. Thanks to his lawyer, Blizzard is soon back at large and kidnaps Bobby Saunders (a boy whom he saw speaking with Spider-Man). Through Saunders, Blizzard intends to get revenge for his most recent defeat. Blizzard mistakes a villainous version of Iron Man from the year 2020 for the modern Iron Man and attempts to ambush him. The future Iron Man is on an urgent mission to find Bobby Saunders (who would grow up to be a terrorist in 2020) and kills Blizzard.

=== Donald Gill ===
Blizzard
- Blizzard. Art by Rick Leonardi

Publication information
- Publisher: Marvel Comics
- First appearance: Iron Man #223 (Oct. 1987)
- Created by: David Michelinie; Bob Layton

In-story information
- Full name: Donald "Donnie" Gill
- Species: Inhuman
- Team affiliations: Assassins Guild; Hammer Industries; Lethal Legion; Masters of Evil; Thunderbolts
- Abilities: Ice generation and projection; Superhuman strength, speed, and agility; Electricity manipulation

Born in Delaware, Donald "Donnie" Gill is a professional criminal who is hired by Justin Hammer following the death of Gregor Shapanka and given a cryogenic suit resembling Shapanka's. His first mission involves working with Beetle and Blacklash to capture Force, who had betrayed Hammer. However, Blizzard is clumsy and annoys his teammates with his amateurish mistakes (such as creating an ice wall blocking the path to their objective). After encasing Blacklash in ice, the trio flees as reinforcements arrive to protect Force.

The trio again tries to capture Force, who is protected by Iron Man. Force neutralizes the powers of the villains, who flee until their powers return. After returning to confront Force, Blizzard doggedly tries to blast Force again (despite warnings), and is electrocuted. Beetle and Blacklash abandon Blizzard and are arrested. Before Blizzard can be jailed, Rhino rescues him under Hammer's orders.

Hammer negotiates with Iron Man for Blizzard, forcing the latter to help him take down Ghost. Iron Man agrees, but Blizzard refuses to believe that Hammer betrayed him. After hearing a recording, Blizzard surrenders to Iron Man.

With the Avengers disbanded, Beetle (now known as MACH-IV) forms a new group of Thunderbolts. Like the original Thunderbolts, the group's members are former villains seeking redemption for their crimes as superheroes. Blizzard is one of the first members invited to join by MACH-IV. He ends up befriending fellow Thunderbolts member Speed Demon.

During the "Infinity" storyline, Blizzard is among the villains recruited by Spymaster to attack Stark Tower. During the briefing, Blizzard suddenly collapses. When Blizzard regains consciousness, he discovers that his skin has turned white. Blizzard had been exposed to the Terrigen Mists unleashed on Earth by Black Bolt. Unknowingly an Inhuman descendant, Blizzard experienced Terrigenesis, gaining the ability to manipulate electricity.

=== Mickey Quaid ===
While Donnie Gill was unavailable, Justin Hammer had a thug named Mickey Quaid become a substitute Blizzard to assist Afterburner, Beetle, Blacklash, Boomerang, and Spymaster in fighting Silver Sable and the Wild Pack.

=== Randy Macklin ===
Blizzard

Publication information
- Publisher: Marvel Comics
- First appearance: Marvel Holiday Special #2 (Jan. 1993)
- Created by: Sholly Fisch; Tom Morgan

In-story information
- Full name: Randall "Randy" Macklin
- Species: Human
- Abilities: Cryokinesis

Randall "Randy" Macklin, an ex-criminal, fails to find work following his release from prison and uses a spare Blizzard costume he was safeguarding for his friend Donnie Gill. Macklin is quickly defeated by Iron Man, who offers him a legitimate job at Stark Enterprises.

=== Jim ===
Blizzard

Publication information
- Publisher: Marvel Comics
- First appearance: The Invincible Iron Man #510 (Jan. 2012)
- Created by: Matt Fraction; Salvador Larroca

In-story information
- Full name: Jim
- Species: Human
- Team affiliations: Mandarin's operative
- Abilities: Ice generation and projection (via suit); Superhuman strength, speed, and agility

A man named Jim became the fourth Blizzard upon being granted cryokinesis by the Mandarin and Zeke Stane as part of their plans to revamp and upgrade Iron Man's enemies. His first mission is to freeze desalinization plants in Abu Dhabi, leaving the city without water. It is revealed that the Mandarin had a bomb placed in Jim's neck to ensure his compliance.

When Iron Man tries to persuade his enemies to turn against the Mandarin, Blizzard heeds the call as Iron Man deactivates the bombs on them. Blizzard works with Iron Man, Zeke Stane, Whirlwind, and the Living Laser to battle the Mandarin and his Titanomechs. During the battle, Blizzard is impaled by a Titanomech.

== Powers and abilities ==
All the Blizzards have similar powers, derived from their costumes. Micro-circuited cryogenic units make it possible to emit freezing rays, which lower the temperature of the surrounding air (or objects) and release ice as projectiles.

Donnie Gill's costume is upgraded by supervillains the Beetle and the Fixer. This enables even greater manipulation of cold, where Gill can encase people in snow and ice, create an ice barricade or generate "ice sleds" for transport. Following his Terrigenesis, Blizzard also developed electricity manipulation, where he can manipulate electrical currents and charge the energies in his body.

== Other versions ==
=== Earth-X ===
The Donnie Gill incarnation of Blizzard appears in Earth X, where he is killed by Norman Osborn.

=== House of M: Masters of Evil ===
The Donnie Gill incarnation of Blizzard appears in House of M as a member of Hood's Masters of Evil.

=== Power Pack ===
The Donnie Gill incarnation of Blizzard appears in Iron Man & Power Pack #2.

== In other media ==
=== Television ===
- Gregor Shapanka / Jack Frost appears in the "Iron Man" segment of The Marvel Super Heroes, voiced by Chris Wiggins.
- The Donnie Gill incarnation of Blizzard appears in Iron Man, primarily voiced by Chuck McCann and by Neil Ross in the episode "The Beast Within". This version is a servant of the Mandarin.
- The Donnie Gill incarnation of Blizzard appears in Iron Man: Armored Adventures, voiced by David Orth. This version is a cryogenics scientist and former employee of Stark Industries CEO Obadiah Stane who was left scarred and vowed revenge. Additionally, Gill wears a technological suit equipped with a freezing ray attached to his right arm. Throughout the first season, Gill attempts to exact revenge against Stane twice, only to be foiled by Iron Man each time. In the second season, Gill is hired by Justin Hammer to kill Iron Man. Following a string of failures, Gill is said to have been taken out by Hammer / Titanium Man.
- The Donnie Gill incarnation of Blizzard appears in The Avengers: Earth's Mightiest Heroes, voiced by Troy Baker. In the episode "Breakout", he escapes from the Vault and fights Iron Man. In the episode "The Man Who Stole Tomorrow", Gill is apprehended by the Avengers and remanded to Prison 42. In the episode "Assault on 42", Gill works with the Avengers to combat Annihilus, but is killed in the ensuing battle.
- The Donnie Gill incarnation of Blizzard makes non-speaking appearances in Ultimate Spider-Man.
- Donnie Gill appears in Agents of S.H.I.E.L.D., portrayed by Dylan Minnette. This version is initially a cadet at the S.H.I.E.L.D. Academy. He and his friend Seth Dormer build a weather device to impress industrialist Ian Quinn, which creates a super-storm that kills Dormer. Gill is taken into S.H.I.E.L.D. custody, but develops cryokinetic powers. As of the episode "Making Friends and Influencing People", Gill perfected his powers while he was incarcerated and was unknowingly brainwashed by Hydra before escaping during their attempted takeover of S.H.I.E.L.D. (Note: As depicted in Captain America: The Winter Soldier.) Jemma Simmons tries to apprehend him, but her superior Sunil Bakshi reactivates Gill's mind-control. Gill is shot by Skye and lost in the ocean, though his body is never recovered.
- The Donnie Gill incarnation of Blizzard appears in Marvel Disk Wars: The Avengers, voiced by Hideo Ishikawa in the original Japanese version and Patrick Seitz in the English dub.
- The Randy Macklin incarnation of Blizzard appears in the Spider-Man episode "Spider-Man on Ice", voiced by Trevor Devall. This version is a henchman of Hammerhead whose powers are derived from a cryogenic gauntlet.
- The Donnie Gill incarnation of Blizzard appears in the Marvel Future Avengers episode "The Mystery Mist", voiced again by Hideo Ishikawa in the original Japanese and by Kyle McCarley in the English dub.

=== Video games ===
- The Donnie Gill incarnation of Blizzard appears as a boss in The Invincible Iron Man.
- The Donnie Gill incarnation of Blizzard appears as a boss and playable character in Marvel Avengers Alliance.
- The Donnie Gill incarnation of Blizzard appears in Marvel Heroes, voiced by Michael Benyaer.
