= Kearson DeWitt =

Marvel supervillain

Kearson Z. DeWitt
- Kearson DeWitt as depicted in Iron Man #258 (July 1990). Art by John Romita Jr.

Publication information
- Publisher: Marvel Comics
- First appearance: Iron Man #258 (July 1990)
- Created by: John Byrne; John Romita, Jr.

In-story information
- Alter ego: Kearson DeWitt
- Species: Human
- Notable aliases: Overlord

Kearson DeWitt is a supervillain appearing in American comic books published by Marvel Comics, primarily as an enemy of Iron Man.

== Publication history ==
Kearson DeWitt first appeared in Iron Man #258 (July 1990) and was created by John Byrne and John Romita Jr.

== Fictional character biography ==
Kearson Z. DeWitt described his father as a brilliant engineer decades ahead of the time. Upon being ignored and ridiculed, DeWitt's father died penniless and heartbroken with only designs of unrealized potential. DeWitt suspects that Tony Stark stole as to blame for stealing his father's designs which were used to build Iron Man's suit. He vows revenge on Stark and Iron Man, unaware that they are the same person.

After Tony Stark is shot in the spine by Kathy Dare and paralyzed, DeWitt plots to plant a chip in his spine, which will allow him to control Stark's nervous system and movements. He meets with the Marrs twins (Desmond and Phoebe) of the Marrs Corporation, who agree to fund his project. The equipment he set up for the chip required human monitors, causing DeWitt to hire people to keep watch. DeWitt's team forces Stark to attack James Rhodes. However, Rhodes manages to land a lucky punch on Stark, knocking him unconscious. Rhodes ends up hiding Stark's body and straps him down so that DeWitt cannot detect him on camera footage. After recovering, Stark storms Marrs Corporation, destroying the equipment responsible for his troubles and scattering DeWitt's men. DeWitt dons his own suit of armor as Overlord and attacks Iron Man. Upon realizing that Tony Stark is Iron Man, DeWitt once again takes control of his nervous system. DeWitt and Iron Man damage each other's armor, causing them to crash to the ground. They continue fighting until Rhodes dons Iron Man's earlier suit and helps Iron Man defeat DeWitt. After DeWitt's helmet is removed, the nearby skyscraper collapses, burying him alive.

DeWitt is later revealed to have survived, but has been rendered unable to walk. He forms partnerships with A.I.M. and Professor Power to trade and sell armor: the Force Ten armor, the Iron Monger armor, and some of Stark Industries' designs. Iron Man, War Machine, and Darkhawk learn about the armor trading and investigate further, learning that Professor Power is involved.

Iron Man recruits the Avengers (Hawkeye, Living Lightning, Scarlet Witch, Spider-Woman, U.S. Agent, and Wonder Man), who split into two teams: one to attack Professor Power and A.I.M and one to defend Stark Industries. Iron Man assaults A.I.M. as DeWitt attacks with a remote-controlled version of the Overload armor. When Iron Man defeats Overload, DeWitt unleashes two more Overload armors, revealing his motives for hating Tony Stark as the battle continues. Iron Man destroys Overload's other armors with a plasma cannon. DeWitt, who is cybernetically connected to the machines, ignores the powerful neural feedback he is receiving and attempts to impose his will over the station's entire arsenal. He temporarily succeeds, but the feedback causes the base to explode. It is unknown if DeWitt survived.

== Powers and abilities ==
Kearson DeWitt controlled a massive suit of armor that he claimed was "virtually indestructible". While none of its arsenal was clearly revealed, the Overload armor seemed to have laser cannons, electric blasts, boot jets, and the ability to put a lot of power behind a swung punch. DeWitt later directed similar suits of Overload armor via remote control. Before his seeming death, DeWitt temporarily had the ability to control a vast arsenal via a neural link.

== In other media ==
Kearson DeWitt appears in the 2010 video game Iron Man 2, voiced by Doug Boyd. This version is an ex-employee of Stark Industries' Theoretical Weapons Division who worked on a prototype Arc Reactor and was secretly involved with the PROTEAN project until he was fired when the latter and its potential dangers came to light. Following this, DeWitt joined A.I.M. and forged an alliance with Valentin Shatalov and the Roxxon Energy Corporation to steal a copy of J.A.R.V.I.S. so they can advance and run their projects. After S.H.I.E.L.D. uncovers their operations, DeWitt merges his PROTEAN technology and the J.A.R.V.I.S. copy to create the Ultimo battle suit before merging himself with it to become a techno-organic hybrid and fight Iron Man, War Machine, and S.H.I.E.L.D.
