= Morgan Stark =

Marvel Comics character

Publication information
- Publisher: Marvel Comics
- First appearance: Tales of Suspense #68 (August 1965)
- Created by: Don Heck; Al Hartley

In-story information
- Alter ego: Morgan E. Stark
- Species: Human
- Team affiliations: Stark Solutions
- Partnerships: Count Nefaria, Ultimo
- Notable aliases: Brass

Morgan Stark is a character appearing in American comic books published by Marvel Comics. Morgan is the nephew of Howard Stark and the cousin of Iron Man (Tony Stark) who is jealous of Tony getting the Stark company fortune.

In the feature films of the Marvel Cinematic Universe, Morgan Stark is the daughter of Tony Stark and Pepper Potts, played by Lexi Rabe in Avengers: Endgame.

== Publication history ==
Morgan Stark first appeared in Tales of Suspense #68 (August 1965) and was created by Don Heck and Al Hartley.

== Fictional character biography ==
Morgan Stark is the cousin of Tony Stark, nephew of Howard Stark and Maria Stark, and son of Edward Stark. Morgan believed growing up that his uncle cheated his father out of the Stark company fortune; Edward actually asked Howard to be bought out because Edward did not want a part in the Stark family business to which Morgan has always tried to take Stark Industries from Tony, such as trying to convince him to sell Stark Industries.

After returning from Ireland, Happy Hogan resumes work at Stark Industries, and Tony gets a letter from his cousin asking for help. Tony does not realize is that Morgan is under Count Nefaria's employ, hoping to use Morgan in a plot to destroy Tony. Morgan uses a visio-projector to make his cousin hallucinate and think of seeing aliens. Morgan begins to make everyone doubt Tony's sanity, and causes Senator Hamilton Byrd (a skeptic) to accuse Tony deliberately of being a communist spy. Before Morgan can blast Iron Man with the visio-projector, real aliens from the planet Froma arrive to investigate Earth and attack Iron Man. Iron Man fights off the aliens and saves Morgan's life. Afterwards, Morgan is forced to tell everyone that Tony is sane, and Senator Byrd's demands are retracted. Morgan is taken back to Europe for Nefaria's punishment for failing.

Following attempts to obtain the Stark family industry for himself, Morgan seemingly dies in a staged car accident, as his would-be allies believe that he overstepped his boundaries. Morgan survives, but is left injured to the point where he must use a cane to help keep his left side mobile. Morgan hires a team of mercenaries called Stockpile (consisting of Joust, Unicorn, Calico, and Sunstreak) to seize control of Iron Man's armors and remotely controls the robot Brass to assist them. Iron Man and War Machine succeed in defeating the mercenaries. Fearing death, Morgan links with every suit currently stored in Iron Man's armory in an attempt to attempt to destroy Iron Man. Iron Man overrides Morgan's link, cutting his control and activating the self-destruct sequence.

In the storyline "Dark Reign", Morgan is revealed to have survived and poses as the CEO of Stark Solutions. Morgan inadvertently merges with the robot Ultimo, which is converted into a virus that gives victims enhanced strength, speed, regeneration, and optic blasts. Morgan is later ejected from Ultimo, which becomes a giant, floating ball of liquid metal.

== Other versions ==
An alternate universe version of Morgan Stark from Earth-1610 appears in Ultimate Marvel Team-Up. This version and Tony Stark were kidnapped by Guatemalan guerrilla terrorists, who kill Morgan when Tony refuses to cooperate.

== In other media ==
- Morgan Stark appears in the "Iron Man" segment episode "Dream Master" of The Marvel Super Heroes, voiced by Len Carlson.
- Morgan Stark appears in The Invincible Iron Man.
- Morgan Stark appears in Avengers: Endgame, portrayed by Lexi Rabe. This version is the daughter of Tony Stark and Pepper Potts. Additionally, an older version (portrayed by Katherine Langford) was meant to appear in a dream sequence that was cut from the film's final release.
