= Midas (comics) =

Midas is the name of two characters appearing in American comic books published by Marvel Comics.

== Publication history ==
The Mordecai Midas version of Midas first appeared in Iron Man #17 and was created by Archie Goodwin and George Tuska.

The Malcolm J. Meriwell version of Midas first appeared in Marvel Team-Up #30 and was created by Gerry Conway and Jim Mooney.

== Fictional character biography ==
=== Mordecai Midas ===
Midas

Publication information
- Publisher: Marvel Comics
- First appearance: Iron Man #17 (Sept. 1969)
- Created by: Archie Goodwin; George Tuska

In-story information
- Alter ego: Mordecai Midas

Mordecai Midas was born in Athens, Greece, and was once a starving child in Europe. He became a billionaire business magnate, determined to become the richest man by any means possible.

Midas rescues Whitney Frost from a sinking ship, gifts her a golden mask that she could use to hide her scarred face, and makes her his assistant. Midas sends Frost, as Madame Masque, on a mission to sabotage the workings of Stark Industries, hoping to kill Stark (and his alter ego, Iron Man) and receive the business after Tony's cousin Morgan Stark inherited it. Midas captures Iron Man, but Masque falls in love with Stark and frees him.

Much later, Midas takes control of Stark International. He battles Iron Man, Madame Masque, Guardsman, Jack of Hearts, Eddie March, Wraith, Jasper Sitwell, and Jean DeWolff. Midas learns Iron Man's secret identity, but is reduced to a mindless husk by the mental powers of Marianne Rodgers.

Iron Man travels to Greece to investigate the death of a private investigator who had been hired to find out who had been stealing gold shipments bound for Stark Enterprises. Iron Man comes across an undersea base containing Midas' Centurions. Midas joins the battle, having been turned into a living being of gold as an effect of his powers being turned inward by Marianne Rodgers' attack. Midas tries to escape on a vehicle piloted by one of his Centurions, but is accidentally thrown overboard and sinks to the seabed. Midas survives and vows revenge on Iron Man.

=== Malcolm J. Meriwell ===
Midas

Publication information
- Publisher: Marvel Comics
- First appearance: Marvel Team-Up #30 (Feb. 1975)
- Created by: Gerry Conway; Jim Mooney

In-story information
- Alter ego: Malcolm J. Meriwell
- Notable aliases: Midas the Golden Man

Malcolm J. Meriwell is convinced that his brother Harrison, a wealthy philanthropist was being tricked by charities and tries to persuade him to cease his spending activities. When Harrison refuses, Meriwell becomes determined to halt his brother's activities. Donning the alias of Midas and working out of Harrison's club, the Hot Spot, Meriwell gets kids addicted to his drugs in a plot to wipe out all black people in America. This attracts the attention of Sam Wilson and Glory Grant. Wilson enters the Hot Spot as Falcon at the same time as Spider-Man, and they confront Midas and his thugs. However, Midas escapes. Heading over to Meriwell's estate, Spider-Man and Falcon are ambushed by Midas' thugs, who capture them. After being freed by Midas' employees and encountering the brothers, Spider-Man and Falcon identify Meriwell as Midas. Spider-Man and Falcon easily subdue Meriwell by pulling the rug out from underneath him and sending Meriwell out the window.

== Powers and abilities ==
Mordecai Midas rides a special throne-shaped hovercraft containing various weaponry and devices, including two telescoping mechanical arms, a heat-seeking antenna, two small anti-personnel missiles, and high-intensity shock blasters. Midas wears powered glove units that paralyze the nervous system and emit liquid gold, giving the victim's skin a golden color. Midas also has access to the Flying Fortress, a gigantic hovercraft headquarters resembling an ancient Greek city, and a supersonic aircraft squadron armed with electric blasters. After Midas was struck by Marianne Rodgers' mental blast, his golden touch power was inverted, transforming his body into living gold.

Malcolm Meriwell uses a special drug spray that he used to get his victims addicted to his drugs.
