= Force (comics) =

Force is a character appearing in American comic books published by Marvel Comics. The first character known as Clayton "Clay" Wilson (legally changed to Carl Walker) character first appears in Prince Namor, the Savage Sub-Mariner #67 (Nov. 1972) and was created by Steve Gerber and Don Heck.

A version of Clay Wilson appeared in the Marvel Cinematic Universe series The Punisher, portrayed by Tim Guinee.

== Fictional character biography ==
=== Clayton Wilson ===
Force
- Force (left center, below Iron Man) as featured on the cover of Iron Man #224 (Nov. 1987). Art by Bob Layton.

Publication information
- Publisher: Marvel Comics
- First appearance: Prince Namor, the Savage Sub-Mariner #67 (Nov. 1972)
- Created by: Steve Gerber and Don Heck

In-story information
- Alter ego: Clayton Wilson
- Team affiliations: Iron Legion
- Notable aliases: Taylor, Carl Walker
- Abilities: Via suit: Enhanced strength Force field projection Flight

Clayton Wilson is a graduate student at Empire State University working as a research assistant to scientist Dr. Damon Walters, who develops a prototype device for creating a protective force field. Wilson steals the prototype force field generator, creates a battle-suit that incorporates it, and adopts the alias "Force". Force goes on a rampage through New York City until being defeated by Namor.

Force appears in the title Iron Man, having become a professional criminal, working for crime boss Justin Hammer in exchange for modifications to his suit. Force and a group of mercenaries hijack the yacht of industrialist Tony Stark (the alter ego of Iron Man) and take several hostages. Iron Man, however, tracks the yacht, defeats Force and his men and rescues the hostages.

Wilson eventually decides to reform. However, Hammer traps Wilson in his suit and threatens to kill him if he reneges on the agreement. Force flees and Hammer sends Beetle, Blacklash, and Blizzard to kill him. Iron Man aids Force in stopping the villains, then lies to the authorities and advises that Wilson was killed in battle to placate Hammer. Wilson is provided with a new identity and employment with Barstow Electronics, a subsidiary of Stark Industries.

Analysis of Force's armor reveals that elements of it were based on Stark's own designs. Stark brings in Wilson to quickly ask him where he acquired that technology, thus setting in motion the events of "Armor Wars" when he learns that Justin Hammer acquired some of Stark's plans thanks to a raid carried out by Spymaster.

=== Second Force ===
During the "Stark-Roxxon War" arc, Iron Man encounters a new version of Force in Caspen, Colorado. Force ambushes Iron Man outside an A.I.M. facility and denies that he is the Force who Iron Man knows. Their fight is broken up when Monica Rappaccini's scheduler comes out and invites Iron Man to a luncheon.

== Powers and abilities ==
Clayton Wilson is a graduate student in physics.

=== Equipment ===
Clayton Wilson designed and used a powered battle-suit incorporating the force field projector designed by Dr. Damon Walters. The suit also provides enhanced strength, flight and can generate an electric current that can be channelled through the force field when activated.

== In other media ==
- The Clayton Wilson incarnation of Force appears in the Iron Man: Armored Adventures episode "Armor Wars", voiced by an uncredited actor. This version is a member of Obadiah Stane's Guardsmen and a former Maggia enforcer.
- Clay Wilson appears in The Punisher, portrayed by Tim Guinee.
