= Bethany Cabe =

Supporting character in Marvel Comics

Publication information
- Publisher: Marvel Comics
- First appearance: Iron Man #117 (December 1978)
- Created by: David Michelinie; Bob Layton

In-story information
- Full name: Bethany Camilla Cabe van Tilburg
- Species: Human
- Place of origin: Earth-616
- Team affiliations: Cabe & McPherson Security Specialists; Stark Industries; Stark Resilient; Iron Legion
- Supporting character of: Iron Man
- Notable aliases: War Machine; Iron Woman; Beth
- Abilities: Skilled hand-to-hand combatant; Use of firearms

Bethany Cabe is a character appearing in American comic books published by Marvel Comics. Created by David Michelinie and Bob Layton, the character first appeared in Iron Man #117 (December 1978). Bethany Cabe is a supporting character and love interest of superhero Tony Stark / Iron Man. She has also been a member of the Iron Legion at various points in her history.

== Publication history ==
Bethany Cabe debuted in Iron Man #117 (December 1978), created by writer David Michelinie and artist Bob Layton. She later appeared in the 1968 Iron Man series. She appeared in the 1989 Official Handbook of the Marvel Universe Update '89 encyclopedic guide series, by Peter Sanderson. She appeared in the 2008 The All-New Iron Manual trade paperback. She appeared in the 2018 Tony Stark: Iron Man series, by Dan Slott.

== Fictional character biography ==
While attending a party for the Carnelian Embassy, Tony Stark tries to draw out an assassin, known under the codename Spymaster, who attempts to kill him. While there, Stark's attention is captured by the presence of Bethany Cabe, a redhead surrounded by potential suitors.

Cabe shortly afterwards becomes Stark's girlfriend, turning up on various missions including a covert operation involving Roxxon Oil. It is after this incident that she reveals to Stark that she is actually a bodyguard working for Cabe & McPherson Security Specialists, alongside her best friend Ling McPherson. Cabe later accompanies Stark to Atlantic City. He comes into conflict as Iron Man with the Melter, Blizzard, and Whiplash. During the battle, Iron Man is nearly overcome by the combined extreme temperatures from the Melter and Blizzard. However, Cabe steps in to save him, providing Iron Man with a temporary distraction. With her expert skills in hand-to-hand combat, Cabe makes short work of Whiplash. However, this battle begins a rift between Cabe and Stark's bodyguard, since Cabe believes that Iron Man should have been protecting Stark instead of engaging in the battle. The rift comes to a head when Iron Man's repulsor, under the control of Justin Hammer, blasts through the Carnelian ambassador, killing him instantly. With Iron Man wanted for murder, Cabe and Stark's relationship begins to cool.

Meanwhile, Stark begins to drink heavily and is on his first alcoholic binge. At Stark's darkest moment, Cabe returns and gives her love, support, and friendship, which is instrumental in helping Stark to overcome his addiction. It is also during this time that Bethany reveals that she was previously married to a German diplomat, Alexander Von Tilburg, who had a similar substance addiction with drugs. Cabe explains her regret and guilt at deserting Tilburg when he needed her the most, and how he appeared to die in a car accident. Cabe believes that if she had remained with him, Tilburg would still be alive today.

Once Stark is off the bottle, Bethany resumes her relationship with him and became his closest confidante. However, Stark chooses not to reveal that he is Iron Man at this time. Shortly afterwards, Iron Man comes into conflict with Madame Masque once again. Masque and Spymaster kidnap Cabe. Masque wants revenge on Stark and displays her jealousy at Cabe's intimate relationship with him. She reveals that Stark and Iron Man are one and the same, believing that this would surprise Cabe. However, Cabe explains that she already figured this secret out weeks before. Masque, in a fit of rage, attempts to gun down Cabe, but is overcome in the process. This incident heralds the start of the long-term enmity between Cabe and Masque.

After a trip to the Caribbean where Cabe and Stark finally seem to find happiness, Cabe arrives home to news that her husband is still alive and being held somewhere in East Germany. She is determined to rescue him, and becomes secretive and cagey towards Stark. Cabe eventually travels to Germany where she is captured and held prisoner at a high-tech installation known as "Der Hand Von Himmel," or "Heaven's Hand." (Note: The correct German denomination would be "[Die] Hand vom Himmel" = "[The] Hand from Heaven" oder "Himmelshand" = "Heaven's Hand".) Iron Man attempts to rescue her. But after assisting her to escape, he is captured and held prisoner at the installation. Iron Man battles the Living Laser in order to escape, but once he returns to the United States, Cabe informs him that she is returning to her husband. Therefore, her relationship with Stark is over.

Stark goes into another alcoholic binge shortly afterwards, which is far more severe this time. Years later, Cabe returns, looking for Stark's help. However, she is captured by Obadiah Stane, who uses mind transfer technology to switch Cabe's personality with that of Masque's. Now, in Cabe's body, Masque attempts to kill Stark. However, she is thwarted by Cabe in Masque's body. Stark manages to successfully transfer their personalities back to their rightful owners. Afterwards, Cabe decides to go back to Germany to officially end her relationship with Tilburg. However, Tilburg is killed via a drug overdose. Cabe does not return for some time.

Years later, after Stark's nervous system is manipulated, forcing him to fake his own death, the giant robot Ultimo begins attacking Los Angeles. Jim Rhodes, in the armored guise of War Machine recruits a handful of Stark's former friends and employees, in order to form a temporary group consisting solely of former incarnations of Iron Man known as the Iron Legion. Cabe is among those recruited. She wears the armor which Stark donned after the Armor Wars, and, along with War Machine and the other Iron Men, battles Ultimo. Cabe and Rhodes are the only Iron Men left standing before Stark returns to destroy their enemy. After the battle, Stark recruits Cabe as his new Head of Security at Stark Enterprises.

Bethany stays on as Head of Security purely in a platonic capacity. However, shortly before the Crossing incident, Tony Stark renews his relationship with Cabe once more. This relationship was not developed as Iron Man vol. 1 soon came to an end, and was not revived in subsequent volumes.

Cabe reappears as Rhodes' benefactor. During this she wears a War Machine Armor similar to his and assists Rhodes in his battles. After several attempts at his employee's lives, Stark hires her as head of security in his new company Stark Resilient.

At the behest of Stark, Cabe is rehired by Pepper Potts to beef up the security protocols for the fledgling startup Stark Resilient and its employees. Distrusting Cabe, Potts attempts to repeatedly undermine her position, lying about the lack of pay, to discourage her from taking the job, and withholding potential information about a mole within the company. Cabe retaliates by secretly capturing video of Pepper, dressed in her personal "Rescue" armor, crying during the Marvel-wide Fear Itself crossover event, then leaking the footage to shareholders.

Cabe later defends Stark Resilient against an attack by the mole, who is revealed to be Spymaster.

== Reception ==
=== Critical response ===
Nishid Motwani of Comic Book Resources called Bethany Cabe "beautiful, smart, and attractive."

== Other versions ==
=== Iron Man: The End ===
An alternate version of Bethany Cabe appears on Earth-9119. She and Tony Stark ultimately get married. In their old age, they retire to a Stark-designed space station orbiting Earth.

=== US War Machine ===
An alternate version of Bethany Cabe appears on Earth-112001. She is Tony Stark's bodyguard and lover, and is also a wearer of one of the Stark-designed armors.

== In other media ==
=== Film ===
- Bethany Cabe was rumored to appear in Iron Man 2, portrayed by Kate Mara. The actress later disputed the claim. Kate Mara portrayed a different character in the film.
