= Iron Man (video game) =

2008 video game

- North American cover art
- Developers: Artificial Mind & Movement; Secret Level, Inc. (PS3, Xbox 360) (Note: Additional work by Hypnos Entertainment.)
- Publisher: Sega
- Directors: Jeff Hattem; Marie-Jo Leroux; Mathieu Fecteau
- Producer: Michael McHale
- Designer: René-Martin Pauzé
- Programmer: David Horachek
- Artists: Olivier Nicolas; Éric Warin
- Writer: Susan O'Connor
- Composer: Mark Griskey
- Series: Iron Man
- Platforms: Nintendo DS, PlayStation 2, PlayStation 3, Wii, Xbox 360, PlayStation Portable, Microsoft Windows
- Release: Nintendo DS, PlayStation 2, PlayStation 3, Wii, Xbox 360: NA: May 2, 2008; EU: May 2, 2008; AU: May 8, 2008; PlayStation Portable: NA: May 2, 2008; EU: May 9, 2008; AU: May 15, 2008; Microsoft Windows: NA: May 6, 2008; AU: May 15, 2008; EU: May 16, 2008
- Genre: Action-adventure
- Mode: Single-player

Iron Man is an action-adventure video game based on the 2008 movie of the same name as well as the classic iterations of the character. It was released by Sega on May 2, 2008 to coincide with the release of the movie in cinemas for Nintendo DS, PlayStation 2, PlayStation 3, Wii, Xbox 360, PlayStation Portable, and Microsoft Windows.

The game features Advanced Idea Mechanics, the Maggia and the Ten Rings terrorist group. The supervillains in the game includes Blacklash, Controller, Titanium Man, Melter, and Iron Monger. Robert Downey Jr. (only as Tony Stark), Terrence Howard and Shaun Toub reprise their roles from the movie.

== Plot ==
During a business trip to Afghanistan to demonstrate Stark Industries' new weapon, Tony Stark is suddenly kidnapped by the terrorist group gang Ten Rings, ordering him to build a missile for them. Instead, he and fellow captive Yinsen secretly build a powered suit of armor. During this time, Yinsen also acts as Stark's mentor, showing him humility and telling him of the horrors his company has caused, making Stark reconsider his life. Armed with a flamethrower and missiles, Stark uses the armor to destroy the terrorists' weapons stockpile and escape their camp, but Yinsen is killed, and the armor is destroyed. Upon being picked up by the Air Force and returning to the United States, Stark declares that his company will no longer manufacture weapons, a move disapproved by his business partner Obadiah Stane.

With the help of his personal A.I. J.A.R.V.I.S., Stark develops an updated and more powerful version of his armor, adding Stark Industries' new repulsor technology and flight capability. While testing his new suit at Stark Industries, Tony uses it to fend off an attack by the Maggia crime family, who have been providing weapons for the Ten Rings. Using his new Mark III "Iron Man" armor, Stark destroys the Maggia's weapons stockpiles and an armored hovercraft. On the way home, he establishes contact with his friend Lieutenant Colonel James Rhodes and reveals his identity as Iron Man.

After these events, Tony returns to his place, where Pepper Potts realizes what he has been doing. Rhodes also agrees to assist Stark with these desires, informing him of a weapons transport in Afghanistan. Stark follows the transport, destroying the weapons, defeating the villain Blacklash, a former Stark Industries worker, in the process, before proceeding to the Maggia's compound to destroy the rest of the weapons, and after infiltrating the mansion, he confronts Madame Masque, who is killed when a wall falls on her. Stark soon destroys the Maggia's flying fortress, ending the threat.

Meanwhile, Stane secretly recovers the Mark I Iron Man armor in Afghanistan and starts working with the company Advanced Idea Mechanics (A.I.M.), Stark Industries' former top buyers, to create a power source. After A.I.M. attacks a nuclear facility in Russia, Iron Man foils them and also fights Boris Bullski, who created a titanium armor similar to Tony's. Stark then thwarts A.I.M.'s attack on a military ship in the Arctic, fighting and defeating the Controller.

After returning to Stark Industries, Tony fights off an attack by A.I.M. forces under the command of Titanium Man, who Stane sent to steal the Iron Man suit. After discovering Stane's involvement with A.I.M. and the Ten Rings, Tony is ambushed by Stane, who steals his arc reactor to create a power source for his armor. Rhodey rescues Stark and learns that A.I.M. has kidnapped Pepper to use her as bait. He saves Pepper from an A.I.M. facility and prevents the explosion of their reactor. Stark decides that A.I.M. is a bigger menace than Stane and decides to confront them first. He heads to their island and destroys their proton cannon before defeating the Melter and destroying A.I.M.'s space tether.

Stark then returns home and battles Stane, who has donned the "Iron Monger" suit. As the battle reaches the top of Stark Industries, Stark orders Pepper to overload the arc reactor at the building. The plan works, and Stane is killed. With all the villains gone, Tony Stark continues to help mankind as Iron Man.

== Reception ==
Reception

Aggregate score
Aggregator	Score
Metacritic	56/100 (DS) 47/100 (PS2); 45/100 (X360); 44/100 (PSP); 44/100 (Wii); 42/100 (PS3) 32/100 (PC)

Review score
Publication	Score
Official Xbox Magazine (US)	5.0/10

The Nintendo DS version received mixed reviews while the Wii, PS2 and PSP versions received generally unfavorable reviews on GameRankings and Metacritic. These versions suffer from gameplay, graphics and controls frustrations. The UK-based Official Nintendo Magazine rated the Wii version of Iron Man 15%.

The Xbox 360 version received an average score of 46% on GameRankings and Metacritic, and the PS3 version received an average score of 43%. These versions were critically panned for the same things as the other versions of the game, with Eurogamer awarding it 3/10 and IGN 3.8/10. It was awarded "Worst Game Everyone Played" by GameSpot in their 2008 video game awards.

== Sales ==
Iron Man sold 2.6 million copies as of March 2009.

== Sequel ==
A sequel game, Iron Man 2 was written by Iron Man comic book writer Matt Fraction, and was loosely based on the film Iron Man 2. The game was released on May 4, 2010.
