= Guardsman (character) =

Fictional comic book character

The Guardsman is the name of several characters appearing in American comic books published by Marvel Comics. The first incarnation of the Guardsman, Kevin O'Brien, first appeared in Iron Man #43 (November 1971). The second incarnation, Michael O'Brien, was introduced in Iron Man #97 (March 1977). The codename has also been used collectively for a squad of armored agents serving as security at the Vault, as well as for a unit deployed by Alchemax to hunt extraterrestrial threats.

== Publication history ==
The Guardsman debuted in Iron Man #43 (November 1971), created by writer Gerry Conway and artist George Tuska. Characters adopting the Guardsman codename subsequently appeared in several Marvel series, including The Vision and the Scarlet Witch (1985), King in Black: Planet of the Symbiotes (2021), Cult of Carnage: Misery (2023), and All-New Venom (2025).

== Fictional character biography ==
=== Kevin O'Brien ===
The first Guardsman is Kevin O'Brien. Created by writer Allyn Brodsky and Don Heck, the character first appeared in Iron Man #31 (November 1970).

Guardsman

Publication information
- Publisher: Marvel Comics
- First appearance: Iron Man #31 (November 1970)
- Created by: Allyn Brodsky (writer); Don Heck (artist)

In-story information
- Alter ego: Kevin O'Brien
- Species: Human
- Team affiliations: Stark Industries
- Abilities: Powered armor grants: Superhuman strength and durability; Repulsor rays; Flight

Kevin O'Brien was born in Chicago. He became an engineer and inventor working for the newly opened Lakani Island plant of Stark Industries who came to the attention of Tony Stark when he invented a stun-ray that managed to harmlessly disperse a crowd of violent protestors. Stark invited O'Brien to transfer to the main plant on Long Island, and he accepted. Despite a careless streak that once caused the laboratory he was working in to explode, he became a close friend of Stark and was soon appointed head of Stark Industries' research department.

On several occasions, O'Brien assisted Stark and the supposed bodyguard Iron Man, notably against the Spymaster and the assistants the Espionage Elite, saving Stark's life on more than one occasion. Stark then decided to reveal to O'Brien his secret identity of Iron Man, and to build for him a second suit of armor for use in the event of an emergency. That emergency would come a short time later, when Iron Man and girlfriend Marianne Rodgers were taken captive by the superhuman madman Mikas the Soulfather. Putting on the armor before being fully tested, O'Brien fell prey to a malfunction in the cybernetic circuitry controlling the armor which apparently stimulated the regions of the brain where rage and jealousy originate.

O'Brien found himself seized with a sudden attraction for Marianne and became extremely jealous of Stark's power, looks, and fortune. At the same time, Simon Gilbert, then Chairman of the Board of Stark Industries' stockholders, grew alarmed that Stark was moving out of munitions production and mapped strategies with the board to seize controlling interest in the firm from Stark as principal stockholder. Clad in armor and calling himself the "Guardsman", O'Brien offered to aid the board in their plot against Stark. As a show of support, he agreed to quell a protest rally outside the plant. Guardsman aimed his repulsor rays at the crowd, injuring four protestors. Sickened by what he did, O'Brien turned on the renegade board members, physically assaulting them. However, seeing Stark with Marianne caused him to once again become unbalanced, and he went outside to vent his rage on the growing crowd of protestors. Stark donned the Iron Man armor and engaged Guardsman in battle to prevent him from doing any more damage. Losing, Guardsman sought refuge in an experimental tank. In an attempt to stop him without hurting him, Iron Man's repulsor rays were trained on the vehicle and accidentally hit its fuel supply. The tank exploded, killing O'Brien.

=== Michael O'Brien ===
The second Guardsman is Michael O'Brien. Created by writer Len Wein and artist Herb Trimpe, the character debuted in Iron Man #82 (January 1976).

Guardsman

Publication information
- Publisher: Marvel Comics
- First appearance: Iron Man #82 (January 1976) (as the Guardsman) Iron Man #97
- Created by: Len Wein (writer); Herb Trimpe (artist)

In-story information
- Alter ego: Michael O'Brien
- Species: Human
- Team affiliations: Avengers; Iron Legion; Project: Pegasus; The Vault
- Abilities: Powered armor grants: Superhuman strength and durability; Repulsor rays; Flight

Michael O'Brien was also born in Chicago, Illinois. Some months after Kevin's death, when the details of the incident came to public light, Michael, a sergeant in the New York City Police Department, decided that the official investigation exonerating Iron Man's actions was a cover-up. Reopening the investigation without official sanction, O'Brien confronted Tony Stark, interrogated several employees, and declared his intention of proving that Stark was responsible for his brother's death.

O'Brien finally hired Harry Key, an unscrupulous private investigator, to get him inside the Long Island plant. There, O'Brien located the Guardsman armor and put it on, determined to use it to bring Iron Man to justice. However, the malfunction in the cybernetic circuitry that affected his brother's brain also affected his brain and he flew into a rage, seeking to kill Iron Man. Iron Man confronted his attack and finally convinced him that the armor was causing him to act insanely. O'Brien collapsed on rebelling against his own urge to kill Iron Man. Stark took O'Brien into custody rather than press criminal charges, hoping to convince the man of his innocence in Kevin's death. While Stark worked on a new set of armor, Sunfire attacked the plant. Stark was unable to put on his new armor since it had not yet cooled, and unable to find any of his spare suits of armor since a saboteur had stolen them. Hence, he was forced to put on the Guardsman armor to fight off Sunfire. O'Brien witnessed Stark's heroic attempts to save lives over a video monitor, aware that Stark was risking a major heart attack by the strenuous activity. Escaping his confinement, O'Brien decided that he was wrong about Stark and determined to help him by donning the now-cooled Iron Man armor. Thus clad, he was mistaken for the real Iron Man and kidnapped by the Mandarin. Stark discovered an old set of Iron Man armor that the saboteur had overlooked and went to China to rescue O'Brien. Upon rescuing him, Stark chose to reveal his true identity to O'Brien before he went off to battle the Mandarin. O'Brien flew back to New York, where he took custody of the Guardsman armor once more.

After Iron Man defeated the Mandarin, Stark fixed the malfunction in the Guardsman armor's circuitry so it was safe to wear. Michael O'Brien was determined to use the armor to vindicate both his brother's and his own senseless actions. Having quit the police force, O'Brien becomes the security director at Project Pegasus, a government energy research facility, after its previous director Wendell Vaughn quit.

=== Ozkar Waters ===
A new Guardsman, Ozkar Waters, appears during the King in Black tie-in miniseries Planet of the Symbiotes. He is a mercenary for Alchemax and father of Bren Waters (the new host of the Toxin symbiote).

=== Other known Guardsmen ===
==== Current members ====
- Harold "Harry" Bright - member of the Vault Retrieval Team
- James "Jim" Cunningham
- Marc Danson
- Paul Danvers
- Charles "Charlie" DeMulder
- Terence "Terry" Doocey
- Frank Ensign (Guardsman Prime) - helped transport the Wizard to prison; later aided Iron Man (Tony Stark)
- William "Billy" Fredricks - first appeared guarding the wounded Portal in the hospital and later seen at Goodman, Lieber, Kurtzberg & Book
- Sam Hanson
- Patrick Herbert - worked at the Vault, was tricked by Mainframe (Ian Wajler)
- Michael "Mike" Ivy - aided Guardsman Prime in the transportation of Wizard.
- Emilio Layton - member of the Vault Retrieval Team
- Conrad Mahlstedt
- Russ Mendoza
- Fred Miller
- Asher O'Brien
- Howard Samuels - mentally attacked by Mentallo, but survived the breakout
- Jaxson Schirra
- Gregory Smoot - was chosen to test U.S. Agent using the Iron Monger armor
- Tim Teller
- Jerry Tinsley
- Eliot Villagran

==== Former members ====
- Marty Delarosa - while off-duty, he met and flirted with Calypso who convinced him to sneak her into the Vault; once in, she killed him
- Larson Dzon - deceased
- Curtis Elkins (Sentry) - member of the Jury and former friend of Hugh Taylor
- Chris Fallon - deceased
- Walt Hanna - deceased
- Rick McLaurin - deceased
- Ravello Medina - deceased
- Corbin Rubinstein - deceased
- Chuck Scott - deceased
- Danny Stephens - worked at the Vault and was the first Guardsman taken hostage and killed by Venom (Eddie Brock)
- Pascal Tyler - killed Cinder, framing Luke Cage and Rhino
- Ernie Vancata
- Scott Washington (Hybrid) - also known as Guardsman 6, Washington became known as Hybrid after bonding with several symbiotes

== Powers and abilities ==
The Guardsman armor provides its wearer with enhanced strength, increased speed, offensive weaponry, and flight capabilities.

== Reception ==
Darby Harn of Screen Rant included Guardsman among the best Iron Man comic characters not yet adapted into the Marvel Cinematic Universe, noting that his "iconic" armor—originally designed by Tony Stark—ties him closely to Iron Man's mythos. Harn highlighted the character's long-standing rivalry with Stark, describing their fallout as an interesting aspect of Guardsman's history. While multiple individuals have taken on the Guardsman identity, Harn compared his backstory to that of Mysterio in the MCU and suggested the character could serve as an intriguing antagonist for Iron Man’s successors in live-action.

== In other media ==
=== Television ===
- The Guardsmen appear in the Iron Man episode "The Armor Wars, Part 2".
- Two separate depictions of Guardsman appear in Iron Man: Armored Adventures.
  - Michael O'Brien (voiced by Brian Drummond) is Stark International's security chief under Obadiah Stane. While he does not initially wear a powered suit of armor for most of his appearances, he eventually pilots the Crimson Dynamo suit in the episode "Seeing Red" and the Iron Monger mech in "Enter: Iron Monger." In the latter episode, O'Brien refuses to kill Iron Man while the hero was aiding a civilian and is subsequently fired by Stane for showing mercy. Near the end of the second season, he reappears as Howard Stark's bodyguard.
  - The Guardsmen appear in the episode "Armor Wars" as criminals and former Maggia enforcers, consisting of Force, Shockwave, and later Firepower, who were hired by Stane to become Stark International's commercial mascots and masquerade as superheroes by causing disasters to stop. Upon learning their armors are based on stolen specs for that of Iron Man's, Pepper Potts exposes the Guardsmen as criminals while Iron Man and War Machine defeat them.
- The Guardsmen appear in Avengers Assemble, voiced by Roger Craig Smith (in "Civil War, Part 3: The Drums of War"), David Kaye (in "Prison Break"), and Trevor Devall and Fred Tatasciore (in "Vibranium Curtain"). This version of the group serve as security for the Raft.

=== Merchandise ===
- In 1996, Toy Biz released a Vault Guardsman figure under the "Techno Wars" label as part of the Spider-Man toy-line.
- In 2018, Diamond Select Toys released a Vault Guardsman mini-figure in wave 30 of the Marvel Minimates toy-line.
- In 2010, Hasbro released a Vault Guardsman action figure as part of the Iron Man 2 film tie-in toy-line. In 2021, another Vault Guardsman action figure was released as part of the Marvel Legends action figure line.
