= Iron Legion =

Fictional set of armors

Publication information
- Publisher: Marvel Comics
- First appearance: Iron Man #300 (November, 1993)
- Created by: Len Kaminski; Kevin Hopgood

In-story information
- Base(s): Stark Enterprises Headquarters, Los Angeles, California
- Member(s): Happy Hogan; Michael O'Brien; Bethany Cabe; Eddie March; Clayton Wilson

The Iron Legion is a series of special armors designed by Iron Man appearing in American comic books published by Marvel Comics, worn by the superhero Iron Man as well as others.

The Iron Legion has appeared in various media adaptations, including television series, films, and video games.

== Fictional history ==
The first version was a temporary team consisting of Happy Hogan, Michael O'Brien, Bethany Cabe, Eddie March and Clayton Wilson, led by Iron Man and War Machine, to battle the giant robot Ultimo.

A second version is a team of human-driven mech suits used by Arno Stark.

== In other media ==
=== Television ===
The Iron Legion appears in Avengers Assemble. This version consists of Iron Man's various armors as well as the Iron Patriot.

=== Marvel Cinematic Universe ===
The Iron Legion appears in the Marvel Cinematic Universe (MCU):

- The first version appears in Iron Man 3 (2013) as a set of specialized armors built for various situations that Tony Stark may encounter and are remotely piloted by J.A.R.V.I.S. The Iron Legion is used by Stark against Aldrich Killian's Extremis enforcers and is eventually destroyed to avoid friction between him and Pepper Potts.
- The second version appears in Avengers: Age of Ultron (2015) as a set of drones.
- An alternate timeline iteration of Iron Legion appears in the What If...? episode "What If... Happy Hogan Saved Christmas?" (2023), where it is hijacked by Justin Hammer during his attack on Avengers Tower.

=== Video games ===
- The Iron Legion appears in Marvel: Avengers Alliance.
- The Iron Legion appears in Marvel Super Hero Squad Online.
- The Iron Legion appears in Lego Marvel Super Heroes 2, voiced by Parry Shen.
