= The Invincible Iron Man (video game) =

2002 video game

- Developer(s): Torus Games
- Publisher(s): Activision
- Director(s): Bill McIntosh
- Producer(s): Kevin McIntosh; Marc Turndorf; T.Q. Jefferson
- Designer(s): Jim Batt
- Programmer(s): Grant Davies
- Artist(s): Andrew McIntosh
- Composer(s): Ed Colman
- Platform(s): Game Boy Advance
- Release: NA: December 20, 2002
- Genre(s): Run and gun
- Mode(s): Single-player

The Invincible Iron Man is a 2002 run and gun video game published by Activision and developed by Torus Games for the Game Boy Advance. The game, played from a side-scrolling perspective, is based on the Marvel Comics superhero Iron Man, and is the character's first appearance on a handheld game console. Within the game's narrative, Iron Man must traverse through a series of levels and recover one of his stolen suits of armor while battling supervillains such as the Blizzard and Crimson Dynamo.

The Invincible Iron Man received mixed reviews from critics, who compared the gameplay to the Mega Man series. While they praised the visuals and generally found the gameplay to be solid, they faulted the game's lack of variety and length, and held middling opinions toward the audio.

== Gameplay ==
An example of gameplay from The Invincible Iron Man

The Invincible Iron Man is a side-scrolling run and gun game in which the player controls Iron Man, who is tasked with recovering one of his stolen suits of armor and tracking down the culprit. The game consists of eight levels, featuring four distinct environments divided into two levels each, and includes three bosses. Iron Man's primary offensive measure against enemies is a pair of repulsors built into his gauntlets, which are connected to an energy gauge displayed on the upper-hand side of the screen alongside his health bar. Normal repulsor shots slightly decrease the energy gauge, while shots that are charged before firing decrease a larger amount. Energy can be restored either automatically over time or by collecting small energy balls scattered across the level. Health can also be restored with designated power-ups. Special power orbs located in various areas allow Iron Man to fire a chest-mounted cannon or to detonate a bomb that clears all enemies on-screen. Aside from these weapons, Iron Man is capable of a shoulder tackle that he can combine with his jumping ability to fly short distances. Hidden within each level is a portrait that unlocks a piece of artwork.

== Plot ==
Tony Stark is alerted that his Iron Man armor has been stolen from Stark Enterprises. Tracking down his technology to the harbor, Stark dons another Iron Man armor to retrieve it. Battling armored soldiers upon his arrival, Stark comes across his cousin Morgan Stark, who the former defeats easily in a battle. Despite getting back his armor, Iron Man discovers that Morgan uploaded the armor's data systems, which would give the benefactors the ability to reverse engineer his designs and turn them against Stark.

Iron Man follows the transmission to the woods, where he encounters a robot army commissioned by an unknown mastermind. The Blizzard appears, and as Iron Man gains the advantage, the villain flees. Chasing the Blizzard to a wintry habitat, Iron Man fights his way through the Blizzard's defenses before encountering him again. The Blizzard explains that when Stark's technology is finally replicated, an unstoppable army will arise. As the two battle, Iron Man disables a chamber that regenerates the Blizzard's powers and neutralizes him. Iron Man discovers a back door to a tower, and enters it to uncover the culprit.

After Iron Man breaks through the tower's security, the Crimson Dynamo reveals himself as the one who orchestrated the theft. Now armed with Stark's armor calibrations, the Dynamo fights Iron Man to a standstill. However, Iron Man exploits a weakness within the Dynamo's armor by overloading it with his energy blasts, helping Iron Man secure the victory over the Dynamo. This results in the armor releasing energy, triggering explosions throughout the tower. Iron Man escapes, as the Dynamo is seemingly killed in the process. In its aftermath, Iron Man ponders if another such incident could have a different outcome.

== Development and release ==
The Invincible Iron Man was developed by Torus Games under the direction of Bill McIntosh, with Torus's Kevin McIntosh, Activision's Marc Turndorf, and Marvel's T.Q. Jefferson serving as producers. The game was designed by Jim Batt, programmed by Grant Davies, and features art by Andrew McIntosh. The music and sound effects were respectively created by Ed Colman and James Langford. The levels were designed by Craig Duturbure, Alex Hutchinson, and Van Ricketts. The Invincible Iron Man was announced by Activision on October 8, 2002, and shipped to North American retailers on December 20. It is the first handheld video game to feature Iron Man as a playable character.

== Reception ==
Reception

Aggregate score
Aggregator	Score
Metacritic	68/100

Review scores
Publication	Score
Eurogamer	5/10
GameSpot	7.3/10
GameZone	5.5/10
IGN	7/10
Nintendo Power	18/25

The Invincible Iron Man received "mixed or average" reviews according to Metacritic, with reviewers commonly comparing its gameplay to the Mega Man series. The reviewers of Nintendo Power enthusiastically compared the game to Turok: Evolution on the same console, and assessed that the graphics, audio and gameplay combined to create a satisfying experience. Frank Provo of GameSpot deemed it a relatively competent example of a comic book adaptation and "one of the few side-scrolling action games that's genuinely fun to play". He commented that the game bypassed the common action game faults of linear levels and unintelligent enemy AI, and though he acknowledged that the combat was repetitive, he determined that the effect was intentional, observing that the large amount of enemies required the player to choose which ones to fight or avoid. However, he was puzzled by the choice of boss characters, remarking that they "aren't exactly the A-list of Marvel Comics villains". Craig Harris of IGN described the game as a "fun romp" that was reminiscent of the many licensed action platformers released for the Genesis and Super NES. However, while he considered the gameplay to be solid with tight controls and decent collision detection, he felt that it lacked variety, elaborating that "there's no discovery; there's no extra weaponry and no special abilities beyond what [Iron Man] has at the beginning of the game". Provo and Harris faulted the game's short length, with Provo suggesting that the game was "five or six more levels away from being a vanguard of its genre".

Code Cowboy of GameZone felt that the game was too similar to Mega Man and other titles in the same genre, with few distinguishing features. While he considered the controls simple to master, he was aggravated by the swift appearance and firing speed of enemies and turrets, which led him to slowly creep across levels. However, he regarded the bosses as fun challenges. Tom Bramwell of Eurogamer, dismissing the title as a "rather limp platformer-with-guns", was confused by the positive critical responses from American reviewers (citing Provo's commentary in particular), summarizing the game as having "few options, functional presentation and only one obvious route to take". He was additionally disappointed by Iron Man's inability to aim his repulsors vertically or diagonally, arguing that such a limitation was "ridiculous" in light of the eight-directional shooting pioneered by Metroid and several other games.

Provo and Harris praised the game's visual presentation, singling out the detailed and multi-layered environments and the large, colorful, and smoothly animated character sprites. Code Cowboy, however, disliked the environments, describing them as cluttered and cumbersome. Bramwell also observed that the amount of environmental detail made background and foreground objects difficult to distinguish, although he too commended the detail and animation of Iron Man's sprite. While Provo deemed the audio to not be up to the same level as the visuals, he acknowledged that the sound effects were loud and the music was fitting without being annoying. Harris considered the music to be "nice", but felt that it looped and repeated too frequently. Code Cowboy found the music average, but spoke positively of the sound design. However, he expressed distaste toward Iron Man's grunting while leaping, likening it to "a Klingon with a migraine".
