= Force Works =

Marvel comics superhero team

- Cover to Force Works #1 (July 1994). Art by Tom Tenney.

Publication information
- Publisher: Marvel Comics
- Schedule: Monthly
- Format: Ongoing series
- Publication date: July 1994 – April 1996
- No. of issues: 22 plus 1 ashcan mini-comic
- Main character(s): Century; Cybermancer; Iron Man; Moonraker; Scarlet Witch; Spider-Woman (Julia Carpenter); U.S. Agent; War Machine; Wonder Man

Creative team
- Created by: Dan Abnett; Andy Lanning; Tom Tenney
- Written by: Dan Abnett (plots); Andy Lanning (scripts)
- Penciller(s): Tom Tenney (Ashcan; #1–4); Tod Smith (#5); Dave Taylor (#6–7); Staz Johnson (#8); Jim Calafiore (#9–12); Dave Ross (#13–14); Jim Cheung (#15–17); Yancey Labat (#18, 21); Hector Oliveira (#19–20); Andrew Wildman (#21–22)
- Inker(s): Michael Avon Oeming (Ashcan); Rey Garcia (#1–4, 6–7, 9–13, 15–22); Kevin Yates (#5); Don Hudson (#8); Mark McKenna (#14); Sandu Florea (#21); Sergio Cariello (#21)
- Letterer(s): Susan Crespi (Ashcan); Jack Morelli (#1–22)
- Colorist: Joe Rosas
- Editor(s): Tom DeFalco; Nelson Yomtov; Mike Marts

Force Works is the name of two superhero teams appearing in American comic books published by Marvel Comics.

== Publication history ==
The first version of Force Works appeared in the comic book Force Works #1 (July 1994), created by writers Dan Abnett and Andy Lanning and initially drawn by Tom Tenney. The team was formed from the remains of the West Coast Avengers, after leader Iron Man left the Avengers due to an internal dispute. Force Works maintained a different outlook than that of the Avengers, trying to preempt natural and man-made disasters.

The second version of Force Works was mentioned in Civil War #6.

== Fictional team biography ==
=== From the ashes of West Coast Avengers ===
Force Works began shortly after the West Coast Avengers disbanded. Tony Stark, otherwise known as the superhero Iron Man, sought to form a superhero group with a different philosophy than its predecessors (most notably the East Coast branch of the Avengers): they would not just stop disasters, but prevent them. The team was initially composed of Iron Man, U.S. Agent, Spider-Woman (Julia Carpenter), Scarlet Witch, and Wonder Man. By the end of their first mission, Wonder Man was thought dead at the hands of the invading Kree, and shortly thereafter the alien Century replaced him. The group used a combination of the Chaos Computer (a supercomputer that used incoming information to predict future events) and the Scarlet Witch's powers to attempt to prevent major world problems.

Force Works used a Stark Enterprises facility known as The Works as their base. The building was fully equipped for the team's use; it featured powerful security and stealth systems and incorporated nanotechnology that would repair the building if it were damaged. It was maintained by a Stark Industries staff, leaving Force Works to focus on its duties. The facility was also administered by an artificial intelligence system called P.L.A.T.O. (Piezo-electrical Logistic Analytical Tactical Operator). The Works also included living and training accommodations and could also produce hard-light holographs.

Although Force Works was officially led by the Scarlet Witch, Iron Man would often act insubordinately and make his own decisions during their missions. Later it was revealed that Iron Man was under the influence of the time-traveling villain Kang the Conqueror (even later revealed to be his future self Immortus in disguise). The team fought several battles, existed for just less than two years, and disbanded. Most of its members rejoined the Avengers or sank into obscurity.

Shortly after the disintegration of the group, Tony Stark died in his attempts to regain control of himself from "Kang" and was replaced by a younger, alternate-reality version of himself. The original Stark did not remain dead for long, due to the events that culminated in the "Heroes Reborn" storyline.

=== Force Works in the Fifty State Initiative ===
A new version of Force Works was mentioned as being active and sent to Iowa as a part of the Fifty State Initiative. Although no members were shown or even named. According to editor Tom Brevoort on a Newsarama interview it could be that the team consists of new super-heroes, some could be existing "Pro-reg" heroes and some could be established heroes "with an upgrade".

Force Works was again mentioned as a team when War Machine was sent into space to deal with attacking Skrulls. Investigating a Stark satellite, he discovered Cybermancer there, and it was implied by War Machine she was a member of Force Works.

== Members ==
- Iron Man
- Century
- Cybermancer
- Moonraker
- Scarlet Witch
- Spider-Woman
- U.S. Agent
- War Machine
- Wonder Man
- Solo
- Gauntlet
- Mockingbird
- Quake
- Maria Hill

== Collections ==
Title	Material collected	Date Released	ISBN
Avengers/Iron Man: Force Works	Force Works #1–15, Force Works: Ashcan Edition; Century: Distant Sons #1; material from Iron Man/Force Works Collectors' Preview	May 2016	978-1302900564
Iron Man/War Machine: Hands of the Mandarin	War Machine #8–10, Iron Man #310–312, Force Works #6–7 and material from Marvel Comics Presents #169–172	May 2013	978-0785184287
Avengers: The Crossing	Avengers #390–395, The Crossing #1, Timeslide #1; Iron Man #319–325; Force Works #16–22; War Machine #20–25; Age of Innocence: The Rebirth of Iron Man #1	May 2012	978-0785162032

== In other media ==
Force Works as depicted in Iron Man. From left to right: Spider-Woman, War Machine, Iron Man, Century, Hawkeye and Scarlet Witch.

Force Works appears in the first season of Iron Man (1994), consisting of Iron Man, War Machine, Spider-Woman, the Scarlet Witch, Hawkeye, and Century. Additionally, U.S. Agent appears in the eight-issue comic adaptation of the series.
