= Freak (Marvel Comics) =

The Freak is the name of three fictional characters appearing in American comic books published by Marvel Comics. Two are associated with Iron Man, while the most recent version appears in The Amazing Spider-Man:

- Happy Hogan first appears as the Freak in Tales of Suspense #74–76 (February–April 1966), by Stan Lee and Gene Colan. He appears as the Freak twice more in Iron Man #3 (July 1968) and #84-85 (March-April 1976).
- Eddie March first appears as the Freak in Iron Man #67 (April 1974), by Mike Friedrich and George Tuska.
- The third Freak first appears in The Amazing Spider-Man #552 and was created by Bob Gale and Phil Jimenez.
