= Robert Bernstein (comics) =

American writer (1919–1988)

- Bernstein (left) in 1965 with pianist Géza Anda (center) and Jerry Schoenbaum, head of MGM's classical music division.
- Born: May 23, 1919
- Died: December 19, 1988 (aged 69) Delray Beach, Florida, U.S.
- Area: Writer
- Pseudonym: R. Berns
- Notable works: Aquaman, Superboy, Superman's Girl Friend, Lois Lane, Superman's Pal Jimmy Olsen,
- Awards: Bill Finger Award for Excellence in Comic Book Writing, 2021 (posthumously)

Robert Bernstein (May 23, 1919 – December 19, 1988), sometimes credited as R. Berns, was an American comic book writer, playwright and concert impresario, notable as the founder of the Island Concert Hall recital series which ran for 15 years on Long Island.

== Comic books ==
As a writer, he is best known for his EC Comics tales and his Superman stories for DC Comics, where he also established the origin and mythos of Aquaman. With various artists, Bernstein co-created DC's Congorilla, Aqualad and Aquagirl, and also Archie Comics' the Jaguar.

Like most comics professionals of this time, Bernstein went largely uncredited, often receiving credit belatedly in modern-day reprints of his work. His first confirmable credit is the signed, six-page story "Ghouls' Gold" in publisher Lev Gleason's Crime Does Not Pay #43 (Jan. 1946). Other early work includes a five-page story in Spark Publications' Golden Lad #4, featuring the character Swift Arrow, plus text fillers for DC Comics and Fawcett Comics, and a 1947 Green Lantern story.

For Marvel Comics' 1950s iteration, Atlas Comics, Bernstein wrote for the war comics series War Comics, as well as several stories of the masked Western character Black Rider. Also during this decade, he wrote for DC's All-American Men of War, G.I. Combat, Our Army at War, Our Fighting Forces, and Star Spangled War Stories; psychological drama in EC's Psychoanalysis and Shock Illustrated; and superhero stories, working with artist Jack Kirby on at least one Green Arrow tale, in World's Finest Comics #99 (Feb. 1959).

With artist Howard Sherman, Bernstein adapted the long-running "Congo Bill" jungle-adventure feature into the body-switching superhero feature "Congorilla", beginning in Action Comics #248 (Jan. 1959).

=== Superman and Aquaman ===
Bernstein's first recorded Superman story is "The Oldest Man In Metropolis", in Action Comics #251 (April 1959). Later work includes the DC titles Superman's Girl Friend, Lois Lane, Superman's Pal Jimmy Olsen, Superboy (as well as the later Superboy feature in Adventure Comics), and features starring Green Arrow and Supergirl. With artist Ramona Fradon, he reintroduced the 1940s Golden Age superhero Aquaman in Adventure Comics #260 (May 1959) and scripted through at least #282 (March 1961), introducing major characters along the way. One of these, in Adventure Comics #269 (Feb. 1960), was the teen sidekick Aqualad, who decades later would become the adult hero Tempest. Bernstein and artist George Papp introduced the Phantom Zone and General Zod into the Superman mythos in Adventure Comics #283 (April 1961).

Later during this period historians and fans call the Silver Age of Comic Books, Bernstein scripted stories of the Archie Comics characters the Fly and the Jaguar, and, with plots by Marvel editor-in-chief Stan Lee, some of the earliest Iron Man and Thor stories, in Tales of Suspense and Journey into Mystery, respectively. Bernstein co-created Iron Man supporting characters Pepper Potts and Happy Hogan in Tales of Suspense #45 (Sept. 1963) with Stan Lee and Don Heck. He also scripted some Human Torch stories, plotted by penciler Jack Kirby, in Strange Tales. He used the pen name "R. Berns" for his Marvel work.

Bernstein adapted the radio drama character The Shadow for Archie Comics in 1964, and his last work for that character appeared in The Shadow #3 (Nov. 1964). Bernstein's last original DC story in the 1960s was "Olsen's Time-Trip to Save Krypton" in Superman's Pal Jimmy Olsen #101 (April 1967). Bernstein wrote one final comics story, "The Miracle of the Catacombs", which was published in DC's Weird War Tales #91 (Sept. 1980).

== Concert impresario and playwright ==
Bernstein founded the Island Concert Hall recital series which ran for 15 years on Long Island.

His presentations spanned three decades. In 1951, when he co-founded the Roslyn Music Group, presenting chamber music ensembles and soloists on Long Island, his concert career as an impresario was underway. Because Long Island had "an omnivorous appetite for the arts", as he phrased it, Bernstein launched the nonprofit Concert Hall subscription series in 1964, offering approximately 30 annual performances of classical, jazz, dance and theater, including Broadway road company shows and New York Philharmonic concerts. The events were staged at Long Island University's C. W. Post Center, the Nassau Coliseum and other Long Island auditoriums.

Bernstein's one-act plays received a posthumous performance in 1993 at the Arena Players Repertory Theater in East Farmingdale, Long Island.

== Personal life ==
Bernstein lived in Upper Brookville, New York, on Long Island. At age 69, he died of heart failure on December 19, 1988, at his Delray Beach, Florida, winter home, survived by his wife, Beverly, of Upper Brookville; his daughter, Alison, of Manhattan; and his sister, Louise Sandler, of Elkins Park, Pennsylvania.

== Awards ==
Robert Bernstein was a posthumous recipient of the Bill Finger Award for Excellence in Comic Book Writing in 2021.

Preceded by Bill Finger	Superman's Pal Jimmy Olsen writer 1959–1962	Succeeded by Edmond Hamilton
Preceded by Otto Binder	Superboy writer 1959–1962	Succeeded by Jerry Siegel
Preceded by Stan Lee	"Thor" feature in Journey into Mystery scripter 1963	Succeeded by Stan Lee
Preceded by Larry Lieber	"Iron Man" feature in Tales of Suspense scripter 1963	Succeeded by Stan Lee
