= Iron Monger =

Comic book character

- Obadiah Stane wearing the Iron Monger armor in Iron Man #200; Art by Mark Bright.

Publication information
- Publisher: Marvel Comics
- First appearance: Obadiah Stane: Iron Man #163 (Oct. 1982); Iron Monger: Iron Man #200 (Nov. 1985)
- Created by: Dennis O'Neil (writer); Luke McDonnell (artist)

In-story information
- Alter ego: Obadiah Stane
- Species: Human
- Place of origin: Earth-616
- Team affiliations: The Chessmen; Stane International; Stark Industries
- Partnerships: Madame Masque
- Notable aliases: Iron Man, King
- Abilities: Genius-level intellect Experienced businessman Master strategist Armored suit grants: Superhuman strength Superhuman durability Flight; Repulsors; Chest laser Computer control

Iron Monger is an alias used by multiple fictional characters, supervillains appearing in American comic books published by Marvel Comics. The most well-known version, Obadiah Stane, first appeared in Iron Man #163 (Oct. 1982), while the Iron Monger armor first appeared in Iron Man #200 (Nov. 1985).

Jeff Bridges portrayed Obadiah Stane in the 2008 Marvel Cinematic Universe film Iron Man, and Kiff VandenHeuvel voiced him in the animated series What If...?.

== Publication history ==
Created by writer Dennis O'Neil and artist Luke McDonnell, Obadiah Stane debuted in Iron Man #163 (Oct. 1982). The original Iron Monger armor makes its first appearance in Iron Man #200 (Nov. 1985), created by O'Neil and artist Mark Bright.

== Fictional character biography ==
=== Obadiah Stane ===
Obadiah Stane was the first Iron Monger. When he was a child, his father Zebediah Stane was a degenerate gambler and Obadiah's mother had already died. One day, his father, considering himself on a "lucky streak", played a game of Russian roulette, and shot himself in the head, which young Obadiah witnessed. This trauma caused Obadiah to go bald, and shaped his outlook on life. Stane became a ruthless manipulator who studied his adversaries to find weaknesses to exploit. Stane enjoys chess, and lives his life with the same kind of methodical logic that he uses in the game.

In adulthood, Obadiah ascends to the position of President and CEO of his own enterprise, Stane International, establishing himself as a prominent distributor of munitions. He also goes into business with Howard Stark. After Howard Stark's death in a car accident, Stane turns his sights on acquiring control of Stark International, now owned by Tony Stark.

Stark eventually learns that Stane is the mastermind behind a series of attacks on him, but is unable to confront him. Stane's assaults on Stark's business and friends push Stark to the edge, causing him to relapse into alcoholism. With S.H.I.E.L.D.'s help, Stane buys out Stark International, renaming it Stane International. Stark relinquishes Iron Man's armor to Jim Rhodes and disappears, becoming a homeless vagrant. Rhodes begins operating as Iron Man and ignores Stane's demands to relinquish Iron Man's armor. Rhodes eventually thwarts Stane in his attempt to take over Iron Man's battle suits.

Looking through Stark Enterprises' records, Stane discovers Stark's notes on Iron Man's armor. The notes are highly advanced but incomplete, so Stane assigns a team of scientists to decipher them. They eventually create the Iron Monger armor, which Stane considers "far superior to Stark's Iron Man armor".

While living on the streets, Stark befriends pregnant homeless woman Gertl Anders, who dies in childbirth. He promises to protect Anders's child and later overcomes his alcoholism. Stark joins Rhodes and the Erwin twins (Morley and Clytemnestra) in starting a new company in Silicon Valley, which is dubbed Circuits Maximus. Stark builds a new prototype armor resembling his original gray suit to test new designs.

Realizing that Stark is once again a potential threat, Stane orders the abduction of Bethany Cabe, and plans an attack to take out Iron Man. He sends an attack drone known as the Circuits Breaker to destroy Iron Man, which Rhodes and Stark are able to defeat. Stane further plots against Stark by switching the minds of Cabe and Madame Masque, and by abducting Stark's old friends (Happy Hogan, Pepper Potts and Bambi Arbogast). Stane eventually detonates a bomb planted inside the Circuits Maximus dome, killing Morley and wounding Rhodes and Clytemnestra.

Iron Man collects the newly completed Silver Centurion armor and flies to Long Island. Iron Man confronts Stane on Stane International's property and defeats Stane's agents. Stane dons the Iron Monger armor and confronts Iron Man personally. The Iron Monger proves to be more powerful than Iron Man's previous armor, but is unable to overpower the Silver Centurion model, which is able to absorb the heat it generates. Stane tries to defeat Iron Man by tricking him into entering a room where Hogan, Potts, and Arbogast are being held in suspended animation and will be electrocuted if Iron Man moves. Refusing to give in, Iron Man uses his armor's sensors to find the power source of Stane's trap and destroys it with his uni-beam, which requires no movement to fire.

With Stark's friends freed, Iron Man confronts Stane, who realizes that he cannot win. Stane reveals Gertl Anders's infant son, whom he had abducted from an orphanage, threatening to kill the baby unless Iron Man removes his helmet. Having detected interfering frequencies in the armor systems throughout the battle, Iron Man deduces that Stane is not experienced enough to pilot the Iron Monger armor without assistance from an external computer. Stark uses his armor's pulse bolts to destroy the building containing the computer, causing the Iron Monger armor to seize up. Defeated, Stane refuses to face the humiliation of being arrested, and instead uses his armor's repulsor beam to commit suicide.

Since his death, Stane has made sporadic appearances as a spirit. During the "Dark Reign" storyline, Stane appears as a member of Pluto's jury of the damned to decide the fate of Zeus. During the "Chaos War" storyline, Stane is among the residents of the underworld who defend it from Amatsu-Mikaboshi.

=== Simon Steele's employee ===
Industrialist Simon Steele constructs a second version of the Iron Monger armor and has an employee wear the Iron Monger in battle against Dominic Fortune.

=== Guardsmen operative ===
The original Iron Monger armor was obtained by the United States government after Stane's death. General Lewis Haywerth has one of the Guardsmen use the Iron Monger to test U.S. Agent's combat skills.

=== Joey Cosmatos's version ===
Joey Cosmatos, Tony Stark's former college classmate, builds a third version of the Iron Monger suit from Obadiah's plans. The Iron Monger battlesuit is worn by the criminal Slagmire, an operative of underworld boss Mr. Desmond.

=== Red Skull's agent ===
The Red Skull has one of his own agents use an Iron Monger suit in an assassination attempt against the Viper, but the Iron Monger battlesuit wearer is apparently killed by the Viper's men.

=== Cabal operatives ===
A group of renegade New York City Police Department officers calling themselves "the Cabal" commissions Stane International to design a suit of combat armor so they can hunt down and kill criminals like the Punisher. Various members of the Cabal wear the Savage Steel armor at different times, coming into conflict with Iron Man and Darkhawk.

=== Zeke Stane ===
Ezekiel "Zeke" Stane, Obadiah's son, gradually adapts his body to be a cyborg who regenerates injuries quickly, no longer needs to breathe, and generates as much energy as the Iron Man armor before constructing his own exoskeleton to help with excess heat and utilize more usable energy.

=== Justine Hammer ===
Justine Hammer utilized her own Iron Monger armor while working with Roxxon and A.I.M. in a conspiracy to take over Stark Unlimited.

== Powers and abilities ==
Obadiah Stane was a genius with an M.B.A. Described as a master of psychological warfare, a cunning business strategist, and a champion chess player. However, he his ego was his greatest vulnerability. As Iron Monger, he used the Circuits Breaker, a flying robotic weapon that fires air-to-surface missiles. He also used a device created by Dr. Theron Atlanta for exchanging the consciousness of two human subjects.

=== Iron Monger armor ===
The Iron Monger armor, manufactured by Stane International and code-named I-M Mark One, is an armored battle-suit of "omnium steel" (a fictional alloy), containing various offensive weaponry including a powered exoskeleton that amplifies the user's strength, repulsor rays fired from the gauntlets, and an intense laser beam housed in the battle-suit's chest unit. The suit provides the user with the ability of subsonic flight, thanks to magnetically powered turbine boot jets. Since the Iron Monger armor was based on a modified version of Tony Stark's Iron Man design, the Iron Monger's abilities are very similar to the original red and gold armor, but with increased power. The repulsors are more powerful and the Iron Monger is also larger than Iron Man's armor. It is presumably proportionally stronger as well. The Iron Monger (unlike the Iron Man armor) is also externally computer controlled. Stane attempted to use the remote control to compensate for his lack of experience in using the Iron Monger armor – a vulnerability Iron Man exploited in disabling.

== Other versions ==
=== Earth-14325 ===
On Earth-14325, this reality's Iron Monger is Edwin Jarvis.

=== Ultimate Marvel ===
An alternate universe version of Obadiah Stane appears in the Ultimate Marvel imprint. This version is the son of Loni Stane and Zebediah Stane, who divorced when he was young. As a teenager, Obadiah is enrolled in a special school at his mother's personal request. Shortly after their arrival, Obadiah murders a pair of students (Link and Dodge) and made it look like an accident, which hardens Tony Stark's resolve to punish Obadiah. Obadiah later attempts to murder Stark, but decides not to after Stark saves his life during a terrorist attack.

=== Ultimate Universe ===
An alternate universe version of Obadiah Stane appears in the Ultimate Universe imprint. This version is an African-American man who is the business partner of Howard Stark, running Stark/Stane, one of the North American Union's main corporations, alongside him. Both of them attend an international event of world leaders in The City at Latveria. When a clone army from the future attacks, Stane dons his armor to fight them until he is killed by a clone of Vision.

Stane is later revealed to have been a member of the Maker's Council, serving as the ruler of the technocratic Union. After Stane's death, Howard Stark is appointed in his place.

== In other media ==
=== Television ===
- Obadiah Stane appears in Iron Man: Armored Adventures, voiced by Mackenzie Gray. This version was Howard Stark's VP at Stark International. After the latter is presumed dead in a plane crash, Obadiah inherits the title of CEO as Tony Stark was not old enough to do so at the time. Throughout the series, Obadiah serves as an outspoken critic of Iron Man who wishes to possess Iron Man's armor for himself while supplying criminals with technology from Howard's vault of abandoned projects. Despite his negative traits, Obadiah has at times showed compassion, which he directs primarily towards his daughter Whitney Stane. Obadiah later creates the Iron Monger mecha, but loses his position at Stark International after Tony discovers evidence that he hired the Ghost to steal Iron Man's armor specs, among other crimes. Seeking revenge, Obadiah uses the Iron Monger to go on a rampage until Whitney talks him down. However, Justin Hammer's assistant hijacks the Iron Monger's controls to attack the city, causing Obadiah to fall from a great height and end up in a coma.
- Obadiah Stane appears in flashbacks in the Marvel Future Avengers episode "Secret Past of Iron Man", voiced by Yohei Azakami in Japanese and Benjamin Diskin in English. This version was defeated and imprisoned by Iron Man years before the events of the series, leading his son Ezekiel Stane to seek revenge.
- Obadiah Stane appears in Lego Marvel Avengers: Time Twisted, voiced by Brian Dobson.

=== Film ===
Obadiah Stane appears in a flashback in Iron Man: Rise of Technovore, voiced by Takaya Hashi in the Japanese version, and JB Blanc in the English dub.

=== Marvel Cinematic Universe ===
Jeff Bridges portrays Obadiah Stane in media set in the Marvel Cinematic Universe (MCU):

- Stane first appears in the film Iron Man (2008). This version is a business partner to Howard Stark and mentor to Tony Stark who secretly plans to gain full control of Stark Industries from Tony. To do so, he hires the Ten Rings, whom he secretly and illegally sells Stark Industries weapons to, in an unsuccessful attempt to kill him. After subsequent events result in Tony ceasing the manufacturing of weapons, Stane gets an injunction on behalf of the company's shareholders to take it over before increasing his weapon sales to the Ten Rings. Upon finding out about Tony's Iron Man suit from the Ten Rings, Stane takes the MK I suit the terrorists had salvaged and reverse-engineers his own powered suit of armor before stealing Tony's personal arc reactor to power it. However, Tony, having used a replacement arc reactor, confronts and eventually kills Stane with Pepper Potts's help.
- Stane appears in a flashback in the film Spider-Man: Far From Home (2019) via archival footage from Iron Man.
- Alternate timeline variants of Stane appear in the Disney+ animated series What If...?, voiced by Kiff VandenHeuvel.

=== Video games ===
- The Obadiah Stane incarnation of Iron Monger appears as the final boss of Iron Man (2008), voiced by Fred Tatasciore. This version joined forces with A.I.M. to complete the Iron Monger armor.
- The Obadiah Stane incarnation of Iron Monger appears as a playable character in Lego Marvel's Avengers.

=== Merchandise ===
- Three Iron Monger figures were released in the Iron Man film toy line by Hasbro, one of which features an "opening cockpit" that reveals Stane inside and another repainted to resemble the comics version.
- A figure of Iron Monger, based on his appearance in the Iron Man film, was released in wave 21 of the Marvel Minimates line, with a battle damaged version also released as a retailer exclusive.
- A figure of Iron Monger, based on his appearance in the Iron Man film, was released in the "Iron Monger Attacks" 4-pack from the Marvel Super Hero Squad line, packaged with two figures of Iron Man and one of War Machine. A second figure, based on his comic book appearance, was released in the "Armor Wars: Part I" 3-pack, packaged with Iron Man and War Machine.
- Two figures of Iron Monger were released in Hasbro's 3.75" Iron Man 2 film tie-in line. A figure based on his appearance in the Iron Man film was released in wave 1 and a figure based on the comic book armor was released in wave 4.
- Hot Toys released a 1:6 scale Iron Monger figure based on his appearance in the Iron Man film in their "Movie Masterpiece" line.
- Lego released "Iron Man: Iron Monger Mayhem", a set based on the Iron Man film.

=== Literature ===
An original incarnation of Iron Monger appears in the novel Spider-Man: Venom's Wrath. This version is Daniel, a teenager who is dressed in a "cheesy exoskeleton" and wields a laser weapon he calls a "hydrogel blast".
