= Freak (Eddie March) =

Fictional character

Publication information
- Publisher: Marvel Comics
- First appearance: As March: Iron Man #21 (January 1970); As Freak: Iron Man #67 (April 1974)
- Created by: Mike Friedrich; George Tuska

In-story information
- Alter ego: Edward "Eddie" March
- Species: Human
- Team affiliations: Iron Legion

The Freak (Edward "Eddie" March) is a fictional character associated with Iron Man appearing in American comic books published by Marvel Comics. He was introduced as a boxer who looked up to Tony Stark, and called himself "Iron Man" in the ring.

== Publication history ==
Eddie March is the second Marvel Comics character to use the Freak name. Like the first, Happy Hogan, Eddie March was another friend of Tony Stark. He wore Iron Man's armor in Iron Man #21 (January 1970), in a fight against Crimson Dynamo. He was the first African-American to wear Iron Man's armor.

March first appeared as Freak in Iron Man #67 (April 1974), by Mike Friedrich and George Tuska.

== Fictional character biography ==
While wearing the Iron Man armor, Eddie March is badly injured in a fight with Thor. Stark decides to use the Enervator on March in a desperate attempt to save him. Though Stark takes precautions to prevent the device from transforming March into a monstrous creature, March nonetheless becomes a second version of the Freak. Stark, as Iron Man, tries to subdue him while simultaneously protecting him from the police. He is able to knock out the Freak with a few nerve punches. Once unconscious, the Freak reverts to human form and Thor's alter ego, Donald Blake, operates on March to save his life. March has not transformed into the Freak since.
