= Stark Industries =

Corporation

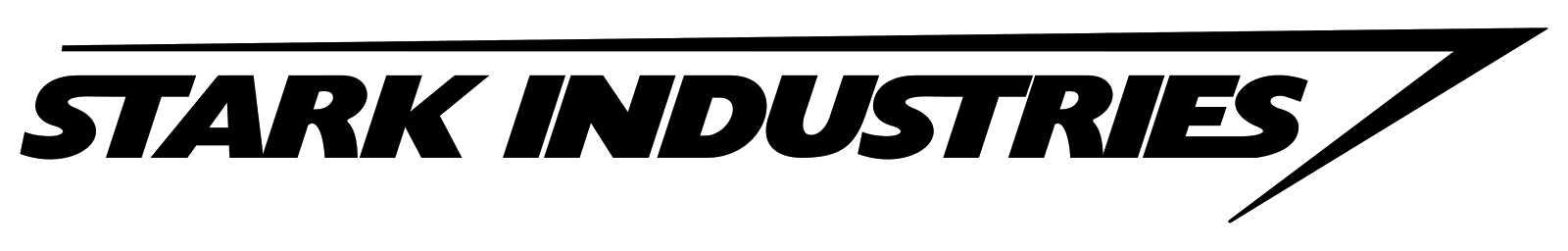
- Logo featured in the Marvel Cinematic Universe

Publication information
- Publisher: Marvel Comics
- First appearance: Tales of Suspense #39 (December 1962)
- Created by: Robert Bernstein; Stan Lee; Jack Kirby; David Michelinie (Accutech); Bob Layton (Accutech)

In-story information
- Type of business: Corporation
- Base(s): Malibu, California; New York City, New York
- Employee(s): James Rhodes; Pepper Potts; Obadiah Stane; Bethany Cabe; Madame Masque; Rumiko Fujikawa; Crimson Dynamo; Happy Hogan

Stark Industries, later also known as Stark International, Stark Innovations, Stark Enterprises and Stark Resilient, is a multi-national conglomerate appearing in American comic books published by Marvel Comics. Created by Frans Robert Bernstein, Stan Lee, and Jack Kirby, the company first appeared in Tales of Suspense #39 (December 1962). Stark Industries is depicted as being owned and run by businessman Tony Stark, who is also known as Iron Man, and was founded by Tony's father and namesake, Howard Stark, from whom he inherited the company.

In the Marvel Cinematic Universe, Stark Industries has a logo modeled after the defense contractor Lockheed Martin and is listed on the New York Stock Exchange as SIA. During the press conference scene, Stark is seen entering a building that resembles the entrance to Lockheed Martin's Skunk Works facility. An airplane similar to the Lockheed YF-22 stood as a statue in front of the Stark Industries facility, much like the prototypes on display at the Skunk Works facility in Palmdale, California.

== Publication history ==
Stark Industries first appeared in Tales of Suspense #40 (April 1963), created by Robert Bernstein, Stan Lee, and Jack Kirby. The company was first identified by name in issue #48.

== History ==
Stark Industries was founded in 1939 by Howard Stark, and then headed by his son Tony after Howard's death. Over the years, through bankruptcy, Tony's "death", Tony's return and hostile takeovers, the company has gone through many name changes including Stark International (later Stane International), Stark Enterprises, Stark/Fujikawa, and Stark Solutions.

=== Stark Industries ===
==== Functions ====
Stark Industries is primarily a technology and defense company. It manufactures the armor worn by Iron Man and War Machine, builds the Helicarriers used by S.H.I.E.L.D, and produces the Quinjets used by the Avengers.

==== Staff ====
- Tony Stark – Chairman of Stark Industries
- Obadiah Stane – Executive Officer (deceased)
- Happy Hogan – Former head of security
- Pepper Potts – CEO
- Dr. Gray Armond – Head Designer.
- Harmon Furmintz – Member of Stark Industries' biochemical division. He worked for Genetech and was born around 1918. He was a child prodigy and was recruited as candidate for Super Soldier Project, but was rejected due to having hemophilia. He attempted to gain the power of Terrax, but his body and mind were destroyed by Shafear.
- Jacob Fury (Scorpio) – Former research scientist.
- Sally McIntyre
- Eddie March – Former part of the Iron Legion.
- Kevin O'Brien
- Ralph Roberts
- Anton Vanko (Crimson Dynamo) — Former Head Scientist and Chief Developer (deceased)
- Arwyn Zurrow – Head of the Miami facilities.

==== Subsidiaries ====
- Project: Caribbean (staff unknown) – Stark Industries made an effort to start a plant in Haiti, however it was destroyed by Night Phantom.

=== Stark International ===
Originally Stark Industries, the name was changed when the company ceased manufacturing munitions, with Tony handing over the CEO position to Pepper Potts. The company was taken over by Obadiah Stane after a hostile takeover and renamed it Stane International.

==== Staff ====
- Tony Stark – Original Head
- James Rupert Rhodes – Pilot, later acting CEO
- Bambi Arbogast – An executive assistant.
- Yvette Avril – Worked for the French branch of Stark International and was brought to the US to become vice president of the Long Island facility. She unsuccessfully attempted to save the company when Tony Stark went on a major drinking binge and quit after takeover by Obadiah Stane.
- Bethany Cabe –
- Dianne Carruthers –
- Morley Erwin – Owned Circuits Maximus as well as working Stark International. He is the brother of Clytemnestra Erwin. He also assisted Jim Rhodes in learning to use the Iron Man armor. Erwin was killed when Obadiah Stane had the Circuits Maximus building bombed.
- Abe Klein – Director of engineering. – Tony Stark's old electrical engineering professor. Killed by Mordecai Midas.
- Scott Lang (Ant-Man)
- Kristine "Krissy" Longfellow – Secretary. She posed as Tony Stark's secretary to be close to him without involving him with a criminal.
- Harold Marks (Techno-Killer) – A research technician. He left to work for author James Spencer; built an armor to gain respect and vengeance from perceived lack of appreciation
- Vincent "Vic" Martinelli – A security guard. He was a former soldier and architect who worked for Williams Innovations before working at Stark International. He remained with Obadiah Stane after his hostile takeover due to difficulty in finding a new job.
- Artemus "Artie" Pithins – Director of public relations. He is currently a White House press secretary. Pithins quit Stark International after Obadiah Stane took over.
- Erica Sondheim – Medical director.
- Carl Walker
- Cherry Wood – A scientist. She studied Doctor Octopus' adamantium arms and dated Stark. She was taken hostage by Doctor Octopus.

=== Stane International ===
After driving Tony Stark back to alcoholism, Obadiah Stane wrested control of Stark International from James Rhodes after a hostile takeover and renamed the company after himself. Stane renewed the munitions manufacturing. However, after Stane was killed, the company was run by a mysterious cartel which was eventually bought out and reabsorbed by Stark Enterprises.

==== Staff ====
- Obadiah Stane – CEO of Stane International.
- Joel Arons – He was involved in a project that kidnapped Myron MacLain. He stole Captain America's proto-adamantium shield
- Joseph "Joe" Faulkner – General manager.
- Dr. Edward "Edwin" Earl Hawkins – Designed the Mass Acquisition Unit. He aided Giant Man (Bill Foster) in battling Doctor Nemesis.
- Karaguchi Inoyawa – Sought to rebuild Red Ronin for peaceful purposes.
- Joseph "Joe" Kilman – After being fired for unknown reasons, he sought revenge by trying to take control of Red Ronin
- Vic Martinelli
- Michael Craig Stockton (Doctor Nemesis) – Sought to coerce Edward Hawkins into creating a mass acquisition warhead.

=== Stark Enterprises ===
After regaining his personal fortune following Obadiah Stane's death, Tony established a new company, Stark Enterprises, in Los Angeles.

==== Staff ====
- Tony Stark – CEO and founder
- James Rhodes – Former CEO (when Stark was in suspended animation following his first "death"; quit upon Stark's revival); former pilot
- Rothvichet Poch – Former lawyer, vice-president and CEO. Alvarez defended Tony Stark in the trial of Kathy Dare.
- Bambi Arbogast - receptionist and former member of the US Department of Defense.
- Veronica Benning/Victoria Michelle – Tony Stark's physiotherapist.
- Bethany Cabe – Security chief and former bodyguard of Tony Stark.
- Diane Carruthers –
- Lee Clayton
- Ed Deal – Worked on the VLS-2980 Project.
- Phillip Grant – Computer hacker.
- Chester "Chet" Harrigan – Former chauffeur to Tony Stark.
- Bert Hindel – Former lawyer of Stark Enterprises. He was fired after he failed to clear up the Government civil suits brought on during the Armor Wars storyline. He also unsuccessfully defended Kathy Dare.
- Happy Hogan –
- Heuristically Operative-Matrix-Emulation Rostrum (H.O.M.E.R.) – An artificial intelligence working in Stark Industries.
- Sarah Jennings – Accounts & Marketing
- Kylie Normandy –
- Dr. Cal Oakley – Former employee of Cordco. Oakley assisted in rebuilding Tony Stark's nervous system following his being shot by Kathy Dare.
- Marcia Jessica "Marcy" Pearson – Former director of public relations and later vice-president. Rhodes fired her when she resented his being named Stark's successor as CEO.
- Garrison Quint – Chief of security.
- James Simpson – Security guard. He allowed Edgar Elliot to sabotage Tony Stark's experimental rocket.
- Dr. Erica Fredrika Sondheim – Medical director and former surgeon.
- Wayne Unnier
- Nick Walcek
- Atha Williams – Secretary
- Roderick Withers – Director of public relations.
- Abraham Paul "Abe" Zimmer – Research director and former member of the board of directors at Accutech. He was killed by Calico.

==== Subsidiaries ====
- Accutech – Research and development company, based in California, that was bought out as a subsidiary. The company produced and designed a Beta Particle Generator which was sabotaged by Ghost.
- Barstow Electronics – Subsidiary of Stark Enterprises based in California. It employed Carl Walker after Force's faked death.
- Cordco – Bought out by Stark Enterprises to force Dr. Cal Oakley to implant a biochip in Tony Stark's spine after he was shot by Kathy Dare.
- Stane International – It was reacquired by Stark from Justin Hammer, who owned SI following Obadiah Stane's death. The company reproduced Stark's original Guardsman armor for use at the Vault. Much of Stane's operations involved disreputable business practices, leading Stark to initiate a major clean-up effort after reacquiring the company.
- Hot Cup Coffee – Created by Stark using the pseudonym "The Boss".

=== Stark/Fujikawa ===
Created by a merger of Stark Enterprises and Fujikawa Industries following the apparent death of Iron Man.

==== Staff ====
- Kenjiro Fujikawa – CEO, founder of Fujikawa Industries, father of Rumiko
- Yu Kirin
- Rumiko Fujikawa – Rumiko is a businesswoman and the daughter of Kenjiro. She was killed by an Iron Man impostor named Clarence Ward.
- Morgan Stark – Cousin of Tony Stark. Became general manager of Stark-Fujikawa after Tony's "death".

==== Subsidiaries ====
- Fujikawa Industries – The previous version of this company helped form Stark-Fujikawa. A Japanese firm which took over Stark Enterprises following the apparent death of Tony Stark.
- Oracle Incorporated – Formed by Namor, the company was sold to Stark-Fujikawa. Formerly served as the headquarters of Heroes for Hire. After Tony Stark's "death", Bambi Arbogast seconded here.
- Parallel Conglomerate – Subsidiary of Oracle Inc. (which would make it a subsidiary of Stark-Fujikawa).
- Rand-Meachum – A company formed by Harold Meachum and Wendell Rand, became a subsidiary of Stark-Fujikawa.

=== Stark Solutions ===
The fifth company was run/owned by Tony Stark and was founded after his return from another dimension. It was shut down by Tony after he was defamed by Tiberius Stone who was subliminally influencing him.

==== Staff ====
- Tony Stark – CEO
- Happy Hogan
- Pepper Potts
- Svengoto Eriksson

=== Stark Industries/International ===
The sixth company owned/run by/founded by Tony Stark and was created after the closure of Stark Solutions. After the events of "The Five Nightmares" and "World Most Wanted" story arcs, Stark Industries went bankrupt and eventually closed down. It was also known as Stark International, both names formerly used in previous incarnations of the company. Its logo is the same as the S.I. Logo in the Iron Man film series.

==== Staff ====
- Tony Stark – CEO
- Joseph Jeremy "Joe" Arnold – One of the Security Department heads.
- David Beaumont – One of the Security Department heads.
- Arturos Benning – One of the Security Department heads
- F.R.I.D.A.Y.
- Happy Hogan – Tony Stark's bodyguard. Killed saving Stark from an assassination attempt
- Michael "Mike" Jochum – One of the Security Department heads.
- Kurt Kennison – One of the Security Department heads.
- Takeshis Kobayashi – Head of Research & Development.
- Archie Merchant – One of the Security Department heads.
- Pepper Potts
- Katherine Rennie – Tony Stark's personal secretary.
- James Rupert Rhodes (War Machine)
- Jack Rutledge – He was involved in the development of a Gamma Radiation Neutralizing Armor. He was later killed by Richard Cummings for covering up the death of Lisa Cummings.
- Ryan Zimm – One of the Security Department heads.
- Gallileo "Leo" Braithwaite
- Jan Kolins
- Svengoto Eriksson – Following closure of Stark Solution, he has been given principal data by Tony Stark and then individually reinvented the AI "Jarvis" and armoury of Iron Man suit. During the establishment of Stark Industries, he gave the research result to Tony. Tony admired him and said that the new suit is like giving Tony a "Regent".
- Martha Johns
- Geoff Douglat
- Dr Dave Allen
- Michael Cline – Supporter
- Horsars Marvel – Supporter

== Reception ==
=== Accolades ===
- In 2011, Forbes ranked Stark Industries 16th in their "25 Largest Fictional Companies" list.
- In 2016, Time ranked Stark Industries 3rd in their "18 Most Influential Fake Companies of All Time" list.
- In 2018, Sideshow ranked Stark Industries 1st in their "Top 10 Superhero Corporations" list.
- In 2019, CBR.com ranked Stark Industries 8th in their "Top 10 Fictional Marvel Companies" list.

== Other versions ==
=== Amalgam Comics ===
An alternate universe iteration of Stark Industries, Stark Aircraft, appears in the Amalgam Comics story Iron Lantern.

=== Marvel 2099 ===
An alternate universe iteration of Stark Industries, Stark-Fujikawa, appears in the Marvel 2099 imprint.

=== MC2 ===
An alternate universe iteration of Stark Industries, Stark Global Industries, appears in the MC2 imprint.

=== Ultimate Marvel ===
An alternate universe iteration of Stark Industries appears in the Ultimate Marvel imprint.

=== Ultimate Universe ===
In Earth-6160, a world preceded by alternate history due to the interference of the Maker, the company is known as Stark/Stane, jointly led by Howard Stark and Obadiah Stane.

=== What If? ===
In a What If story, the company is known as Stark Interplanetary and created the Irondroids.

== In other media ==
=== Television ===
- Stark Industries appears in Iron Man (1994). Julia Carpenter (the second Spider-Woman) is depicted as the head of Stark Industries' research and development.
- Stark Enterprises appears in Spider-Man: The Animated Series.
- A Stark Enterprises building appears in the X-Men: Evolution episode "On Angels' Wings".
- Stark International is featured in Iron Man: Armored Adventures. After Howard Stark is abducted by the Mandarin and presumed dead, Obadiah Stane becomes the CEO of Stark Industries. In the episode "Heavy Mettle", Stane is fired by the chairman of the board after Tony Stark and Roberta Rhodes show the board of directors footage of Stane making a deal with Ghost. In the episode "The Hammer Falls", Howard Stark returns and reclaims ownership of Stark International.
- Stark Industries appears in The Super Hero Squad Show.
- Stark Industries appears in The Avengers: Earth's Mightiest Heroes.
- Stark Industries' Japanese branch appears in Marvel Anime: Iron Man.
- A Stark Industries lab appears in Ultimate Spider-Man episode "Flight of the Iron Spider".
- A Stark Industries billboard appears in the X-Men '97 episode "Bright Eyes".

=== Video games ===
- A Stark Industries building appears in Spider-Man (2000).
- Stark Industries appears in The Punisher.
- A Stark Industries sign appears in the opening cutscene for Marvel vs. Capcom 3: Fate of Two Worlds.
- Stark Industries appears in Fortnite.

=== Theme parks ===
Stark Industries is featured in Marvel Super Hero Island at the Islands of Adventure theme park, part of Universal Orlando Resort.
