= Spymaster (character) =

Marvel supervillain

- The Sinclair Abbott incarnation of Spymaster as depicted in Iron Man: The Inevitable #2 (March 2006). Art by Frazer Irving.

Publication information
- Publisher: Marvel Comics
- First appearance: (Original); Iron Man #33 (January 1971) (Sharen); Iron Man #220 (July 1987) (Lemon); Iron Man #254 (March 1990) (Abbott); Iron Man: Inevitable #1 (February 2006)
- Created by: Allyn Brodsky; Don Heck; Stan Lee

In-story information
- Alter ego: Unknown; Mark Sharen; Nathan Lemon; Sinclair Abbott
- Species: Human
- Team affiliations: Espionage Elite; A.I.M. Maggia; Roxxon; S.H.I.E.L.D. Zodiac
- Partnerships: Justin Hammer
- Notable aliases: (First Spymaster): Cobalt Man, Iron Knight, Hogan Potts, Spare Parts Man, Golden Avenger, Shellhead, Ted Calloway, Jake Jordan, Tony Stark (Lemon): Number One, Santa Claus, Harmon Taylor
- Abilities: Exceptional strategist Excellent hand to hand combatant Extraordinary industrial spy and saboteur Master of disguise Superb actor Highly agile and skilled athlete Greatly skilled in the uses of virtually any kind of gun Access to cutting-edge technology Use of electronically amplified nun-chakas Wears bulletproof battlesuit that grants: Minimal protection from physical attacks Various pockets for holding weaponry

Spymaster is the name of several supervillains appearing in American comic books published by Marvel Comics, primarily as enemies of Iron Man. The first Spymaster debuted in Iron Man #33 (January 1971), and was created by Allyn Brodsky, Don Heck, and Stan Lee.

== Fictional character biography ==
=== Original Spymaster ===
The original Spymaster is a costumed freelance industrial spy, saboteur, and assassin who wields advanced weaponry. He and his team of assistants, the Espionage Elite, are hired by the criminal organization Zodiac to infiltrate Stark Industries and steal Tony Stark's secrets. Spymaster later aids Aquarius, Capricorn, and Sagittarius in an attempt to steal the Zodiac Key from Stark.

The original Spymaster returns in the Dark Reign storyline, where he has been living off the radar until he is found by Norman Osborn. Spymaster is hired to steal a treasured photograph of Tony Stark's parents, which Osborn burns.

=== Mark Sharen ===
A different Spymaster came into conflict with fellow Iron Man enemy Ghost. After Spymaster attempts to assassinate Ghost under orders from Roxxon, Iron Man arrives, causing the two villains to attempt an escape. Ghost offers Spymaster one of his intangibility devices and Spymaster uses the device to pass through a wall. Ghost removes the device from Spymaster's chest while he was still phasing through a wall, causing him to rematerialize partially inside the wall and die instantly. The series Official Handbook of the Marvel Universe reveals that the Spymaster who died is a separate individual named Mark Sharen.

=== Nathan Lemon ===
The second Spymaster, Nathan Lemon, is an accomplished student of the Taskmaster who assumes the Spymaster mantle after killing all other contenders in a battleground simulator. Lemon has the Espionage Elite spy in Tony Stark's office, which leads to them learning Stark's secret identity as Iron Man. Acting under orders from the Mandarin, the Elite ambush and beat Stark until Black Widow intervenes.

In the series Iron Man: Inevitable, Sinclair Abbott has Lemon's wife kill him, and then succeeds him as Spymaster.

=== Sinclair Abbott ===
Sinclair Abbot, a wealthy industrialist, is the latest person to hold the Spymaster mantle. He achieved this by having Nathan Lemon arrested, severely beaten in jail, and then killed by his wife. Abbot takes no direct actions against Iron Man, choosing to send Ghost against him.

During the Civil War storyline, the Spymaster is hired by World Islamic Peace Coalition chairman Karim Najeeb to kill Iron Man. Spymaster kills Tony Stark's chauffeur and attempts to use Happy Hogan as live bait to draw Iron Man, but Hogan attacks him. The two fall several stories to the ground, with Hogan sustaining severe injuries that he later dies from.

After being defeated and rendered powerless during an attempted assault on Stark Resilient, Spymaster commits "suicide by cop" and is shot by the police officers guarding him.

He is later revealed to be alive and battles Iron Man and Ironheart, who uses one of Mandarin's rings to banish him to the Darkforce Dimension.

== Powers and abilities ==
Each Spymaster has no superhuman abilities. However, each is an exceptional fighter and strategist. The first Spymaster was an excellent hand-to-hand combatant, with formal training in boxing and various martial arts. The second Spymaster is also an excellent hand-to-hand combatant, having been trained at the Taskmaster's Academy. Each is also an extraordinary industrial spy and saboteur, master of disguise, a superb actor, a highly agile and skilled athlete, and greatly skilled in the uses of virtually any kind of gun. Spymaster has access to cutting-edge technology for a number of espionage-related devices and weapons, both of his own design and those of Justin Hammer's. The original Spymaster used various special devices including, devices in his gloves and mask that projected concussive energy blasts, small and powerful hovering electromagnets, incendiary missiles, "razor-discs" that could pierce Iron Man's armor, devices that enabled him to absorb Iron Man's repulsor energy, stunguns, sleep inducing "somnu-gas", boot jets that allowed flight, and a device in his belt buckle that summoned an advanced model hovercraft that could operate automatically according to pre-programmed instructions. Both the first and second Spymasters have employed electronically amplified nun-chakas that can damage Iron Man's armor. The Spymaster wears bulletproof Kevlar body armor which provides some protection from physical attacks, and contains various pockets for holding weaponry.

== In other media ==
An unidentified Spymaster appears in The Incredible Hulk episode "Prisoner of the Monster".
