= Happy Hogan (character) =

Marvel Comics character

- Happy Hogan as depicted in All-New Iron Manual (July 2008). Art by Ron Lim.

Publication information
- Publisher: Marvel Comics
- First appearance: Tales of Suspense #45 (Sept. 1963)
- Created by: Stan Lee; Robert Bernstein; Don Heck

In-story information
- Full name: Harold Joseph "Happy" Hogan
- Species: Human (currently); Human mutate (formerly)
- Team affiliations: Stark Industries; Iron Legion
- Notable aliases: Freak; Citizen V
- Abilities: As Happy: Proficient bodyguard, hand-to-hand combatant, and driver; As Freak: Superhuman strength and durability; Radiation manipulation

Harold Joseph "Happy" Hogan is a character appearing in American comic books published by Marvel Comics. He is usually depicted as a supporting character in stories featuring Iron Man / Tony Stark, for whom he works as a chauffeur, bodyguard, and personal assistant. Happy is close friends with his employer, and is among the first people in the Marvel Universe to discover his identity as the armored superhero. He is also the father of the Teen Abomination, was married to Pepper Potts, and has occasionally been mutated into the giant, savage, nearly mindless, superhumanly strong humanoid known as the Freak. Hogan earned the ironic nickname "Happy" during his boxing days from his reluctance to smile.

Director Jon Favreau portrays Happy Hogan in the Marvel Cinematic Universe films Iron Man (2008), Iron Man 2 (2010), Iron Man 3 (2013), Spider-Man: Homecoming (2017), Avengers: Endgame, Spider-Man: Far From Home (both 2019), Spider-Man: No Way Home (2021) and Deadpool & Wolverine (2024). Favreau also voices alternate reality versions of the character in the Disney+ animated series What If...? (2021 and 2023).

== Publication history ==
Created by writers Stan Lee and Robert Bernstein and artist Don Heck, Happy Hogan first appeared in Tales of Suspense #45 (Sept. 1963).

== Character biography ==
A former boxer with a history of losing fights, Hogan rescues Tony Stark from a car accident, and Stark hires him as a chauffeur and personal assistant as a reward. Hogan later learns Stark's secret identity as Iron Man.

While ill, Happy is mutated into the Freak, a giant, savage humanoid creature, when doctors try to cure him using a cobalt ray machine powered by Stark's experimental "Enervator" device. The Freak breaks loose and goes on a rampage, escaping before Iron Man can arrive to stop him.

Iron Man leads the Freak back to his laboratory, but runs out of power and collapses. The Freak encounters Pepper Potts, who faints at the sight of him, and he carries her away. The police fire on him, causing him to drop Pepper. Iron Man saves Pepper, and leads the Freak to his lab again. He is restored to his normal self when Iron Man exposes him to the Enervator once again, though he is afflicted with temporary amnesia.

After Happy is injured while wearing the Iron Man armor, Stark uses the Enervator to save him, thinking that he has corrected the problems with the device. But again it transforms Happy into the Freak, who goes on another rampage. He exposes himself to cobalt radiation, causing him to glow with cobalt energy that will eventually reach critical mass and cause him to explode. The two battle, until Stark is able to use the Enervator to again revert Happy to normal, apparently for the last time.

He marries Pepper Potts in Tales of Suspense #91 (July 1967), but they later divorce. The two later remarry.

With the events of the 2006 "Civil War" storyline causing Tony Stark considerable moral, political and emotional problems, Happy Hogan continues to give him much needed advice. In an important moment of crisis, he says to Tony: "You, my friend, are the only cape in the bunch [of superheroes] that's both one of us [that is, human] and one of them. Who else can see both sides the way you do?" On the night of his anniversary with Pepper, Hogan is attacked by Spymaster, who is seeking to use Hogan as bait to draw out Iron Man. The Spymaster threatens to kill Hogan first, then Pepper. Angered, Hogan grabs him by the neck and they fall several stories. Hogan is left in a vegetative coma and eventually dies from his injuries.

After experiencing a moral inversion, Tony is confronted by a new, teenage version of Abomination when he relocates to San Francisco. While talking with Teen Abomination, Tony learns that he is Jamie Carlson, the son of former Stark Industries employee Katrina Carlson who was exposed to gamma radiation during an accident at the company. Initially planning to analyze and use Teen Abomination's powers for himself, Tony changes his mind when the analysis of the boy's DNA reveals that Happy Hogan was his father, leaving Tony resolving to heal the boy as Happy was one of the few people he ever respected.

In the series Iron Man (2026), Hogan is revealed to have survived and become Citizen V, intending to protect Tony Stark. A flashback reveals that Happy's body was exhumed from his grave and that he was revived by a mysterious person.

== Powers and abilities ==
Happy Hogan has skills in hand-to-hand combat like boxing. In addition, he is a skilled driver.

As the Freak, Happy possesses immense strength and durability. Freak has the ability to absorb cobalt energy and increase his power. In this form, he could discharge it from his hands into blasts. He can also release lethal radioactive levels to create nuclear explosions.

== Other versions ==
=== Amalgam Comics ===
Happy Kalmaku, a composite character based on Happy Hogan and DC Comics character Thomas Kalmaku, appears in the Amalgam Comics one-shot Iron Lantern.

=== Heroes Reborn ===
An alternate universe version of Happy Hogan from a pocket universe created by Franklin Richards appears in Heroes Reborn. This version is Tony Stark's public relations chief.

=== Marvel Zombies Return ===
An alternate universe version of Happy Hogan appears in Marvel Zombies Return. This version is an employee of Stark International. After investigating a disturbance in the building's basement, Hogan is attacked by the zombified Giant-Man, who bites him and converts him into a zombie. Hogan leads a zombie outbreak among Stark International's staff before being killed by James Rhodes.

=== Ultimate Marvel ===
An alternate universe version of Happy Hogan appears in the Ultimate Marvel imprint. This version has a supervisory position at the Ultimates' headquarters called the Triskelion.

=== What If... Loki Was Worthy? (Earth-TRN1364) ===
An alternate universe version of Happy Hogan appears in the novel What If... Loki Was Worthy? (written by Madeleine Roux). During a mischief orchestrated by Loki (which involved sabotaging the Destroyer with help from the dwarf Kvisa Röksdóttir) meant to humiliate Thor, Hogan is caught in a crossfire between Thor and the out-of-control Destroyer, and killed trying to stop the disaster. His death becomes a catalyst for Tony Stark, who is driven to revenge on Asgard, and rebuilds the remains of the Destroyer armor into the Iron Destroyer.

== In other media ==
=== Television ===
Happy Hogan as depicted in Iron Man: Armored Adventures

- Happy Hogan appears in the "Iron Man" segment of The Marvel Super Heroes, voiced by Tom Harvey.
- A teenage Happy Hogan appears in Iron Man: Armored Adventures, voiced by Alistair Abell. This version is a jock, a high school student, and a friend of Tony Stark.

=== Marvel Cinematic Universe ===
Happy Hogan appears in media set in the Marvel Cinematic Universe (MCU), portrayed by Jon Favreau. This version is Tony Stark's bodyguard, chauffeur, and later head of security, as well as a close friend of his and occasional ally of Peter Parker. Hogan appears in the live-action films Iron Man, Iron Man 2, Iron Man 3, Spider-Man: Homecoming, Avengers: Infinity War via a deleted scene, Avengers: Endgame, Spider-Man: Far From Home, Spider-Man: No Way Home, and Deadpool & Wolverine. Additionally, Favreau voices several alternate timeline variants of Hogan in the Disney+ animated series What If...?, such as one who was accidentally injected with a sample of Bruce Banner's blood, which causes him to mutate into the Freak while retaining his intelligence, and Sir Harold "The Happy" Hogan of a Renaissance-themed universe who can also transform into the Freak.

=== Video games ===
Happy Hogan, based on the MCU incarnation, appears as an unlockable playable character in Lego Marvel's Avengers, voiced by Chris Cox.
