= War Machine =

Marvel Comics fictional character

James "Rhodey" Rhodes War Machine
- War Machine on the textless variant cover of Secret Avengers #5 (September 2010). Art by Mike Deodato.

Publication information
- Publisher: Marvel Comics
- First appearance: James "Rhodey" Rhodes: Iron Man #118 (January 1979); As Iron Man: Iron Man #169 (April 1983); As War Machine: Iron Man #291 (April 1993); As Iron Patriot: Gambit #13 (May 2013)
- Created by: David Michelinie; John Byrne; Bob Layton

In-story information
- Alter ego: Col. James Rupert "Rhodey" Rhodes
- Species: Human
- Team affiliations: Avengers; The Crew; Force Works; Initiative; Iron Legion; Office of National Emergency; Secret Avengers; Secret Defenders; Stark Enterprises; United States Department of Defense; United States Marine Corps; West Coast Avengers
- Partnerships: Iron Man
- Notable aliases: Iron Man; Iron Patriot; Commander Rhodes; Hulk Machine; Iron Man 2.0; Rhodey; Shellshock; The Pilot; Kellen Focht
- Abilities: Experienced Marine trained in armed and unarmed combat; Aviator and aviation engineering; Utilizes powered armor suit

War Machine is a superhero appearing in American comic books published by Marvel Comics. Created by David Michelinie, John Byrne and Bob Layton as a supporting character for Iron Man, he first appeared in Iron Man #118 (1979) and became a superhero with the Iron Man armor in issue #169 (1983). War Machine has since been established as an independent superhero and appeared in multiple standalone series in addition to his appearances in Iron Man comics.

Col. James Rupert "Rhodey" Rhodes is a military veteran and pilot who began working for Tony Stark, eventually discovering that he was Iron Man and then taking Stark's place when he was incapacitated. Stark subsequently gave Rhodes the War Machine armor. The character is among the earliest African American superheroes in mainstream comics. His race, his military experience, and his sense of morality are often used to contrast him with Tony Stark and to analyze the themes of Iron Man stories through a different perspective. War Machine is the primary romantic interest of Carol Danvers, while many of his other supporting characters and villains overlap with those of Iron Man.

War Machine has been the main character of two War Machine volumes (1994–1996 and 2009–2010), as well as other stories including The Crew (2003), Iron Man 2.0 (2011), and Iron Patriot (2014). An adaptation of War Machine appears in the Marvel Cinematic Universe, portrayed by Terrence Howard in Iron Man (2008) and by Don Cheadle in subsequent appearances.

While he is more of a side character, he does sometimes have notable features such as in multiple Avengers movies, comics, and merchandise.

== Publication history ==
=== 20th century ===
James Rhodes was created by writer David Michelinie with artists John Byrne and Bob Layton. Rhodes first appeared in a single panel of Iron Man #118 (1979), introduced as a friend of Tony Stark, and he saw a recurring role as Stark's personal helicopter pilot. Many comic books and other works in popular culture had begun introducing duos of one white character and one Black character. Such a development had not occurred in Iron Man until Rhodes's introduction. One African American character, Eddie March, was introduced as Iron Man's successor in Iron Man #21 (1970), but this character was severely injured and written out of the series before being elevated as Iron Man's partner. Shortly after his first appearance, Rhodes assisted Iron Man in defeating Justin Hammer throughout issues published in 1979. He was established as a more prominent supporting character in Iron Man #144 (1981), which described his connection to Tony Stark and how they met during the Vietnam War. This depiction of Rhodes made him a central character in Iron Man's history and origin, elevating his importance.

When Denny O'Neil was the writer for Iron Man comics, he chose to write Stark out of the role entirely in favor of Rhodes. Rhodes was first portrayed using Iron Man armor in Iron Man #169 (1983), when he had to fight a villain in the stead of a drunk and defeated Tony Stark. A black superhero replacing a white one was almost unprecedented at the time, with DC Comics having only recently attempted a similar change with its character John Stewart, who was created by O'Neil. From this change, O'Neil created a story arc in which Stark relapsed into alcoholism and Rhodes reluctantly took up the armor and the title of Iron Man. The change saw mixed reactions from readers, as Rhodes's tenure as Iron Man emphasized his lack of experience or expertise regarding the Iron Man armor. For the duration of the story arc, the Iron Man series focused primarily on Rhodes, with Stark's recovery being relegated to a subplot. It also included the Secret Wars crossover event, which featured Rhodes as Iron Man rather than Stark. Stark resumed the role of Iron Man in Iron Man #200 (1985).

During Iron Man's 1988 Armor Wars story arc, Rhodes accompanies Iron Man in his mission to fight those who had acquired the Iron Man armor technology. Rhodes again served as a replacement for Stark beginning in Iron Man #284 (1992), while Stark was in suspended animation. He began using the War Machine armor at this time, continuing as Iron Man until Stark returned the following year in issue #289. Keeping the War Machine armor, Rhodes was established as a new superhero, War Machine. He subsequently appeared in Avengers West Coast beginning in issue #94 (1993), but the series ended shortly afterward. Iron Man writer Len Kaminski did not intend to give Rhodes the War Machine armor permanently, but editor Nel Yomtov insisted after it was well received.

War Machine was one of several characters to serve as grittier and more violent anti-hero versions of established characters during the 1990s. The character received his own series with the release of War Machine #1 (1994), written by Kaminski and Scott Benson and penciled by Gabriel Gecko. This series featured Deathlok and Cable as supporting characters, and it ran for twenty-five issues across two years. War Machine was introduced with a story relating to Africa and the continent's politics, reflecting Western interest in the subject following widespread reporting of the Somali, Rwandan, and Liberian civil wars. By issue #15 (1995), the focus shifted to speculative fiction involving aliens and time travel. Rhodes was given symbiotic alien armor during this series to differentiate him from Iron Man, but the change was short-lived. The series ended during a larger reorganization of Marvel amid financial problems. In the years following the end of War Machine, Rhodes became a minor character with only limited appearances.

=== 21st century ===
The short-lived 2003 series The Crew by Christopher Priest and Joe Bennett featured War Machine as a main character. This role saw him entirely separate from Iron Man for the first time, as he pawns off parts from his armor. He subsequently appeared in the Sentinel Squad ONE miniseries. As anti-terrorism became a prominent theme in fiction after the September 11 attacks, War Machine slowly became a more significant supporting character. Stark's central role in the Marvel Universe elevated War Machine, as did Rhodes's own military backstory. During the 2008 Secret Invasion event, writer Christos Gage wrote issues #33–35 of Iron Man: Director of S.H.I.E.L.D., in which War Machine replaced Iron Man as the main character.

As a follow up to the one-shot Dark Reign: New Nation, a new War Machine series was launched, written by Greg Pak and illustrated by Leonardo Manco. Running for one year, it followed a similar plot to the African story arc of War Machine's first series but instead took place in the Middle East, reflecting American interest in the region during the War in Afghanistan and the Iraq War. War Machine became more well known after the character was adapted to film, beginning in 2008. He had a significant presence in the comic series The Invincible Iron Man, which began the same year and ran until 2012. In this series, writer Matt Fraction had Rhodes join the military as War Machine. Rhodes's next solo series was Iron Man 2.0 (2011). Following this, Rhodes was reintroduced as the Iron Patriot, reflecting changes made to the film adaptation of the character. The political thriller series Iron Patriot ran in 2014, written by Ales Kot and illustrated by Garry Brown. As part of Marvel's 2016 event Civil War II, Rhodes's character was killed off to emphasize the story's stakes. The choice was controversial, both for the lack of narrative payoff and for the choice of killing one of Marvel's main non-white characters. The character was resurrected in The Invincible Iron Man #600 (2018).

== Characterization ==
=== Fictional character biography ===
James Rhodes grew up in South Philadelphia until he enlisted in the military. While serving in the Vietnam War, Rhodes encounters Iron Man, who had just built his first armor and escaped from his captors, and the two work together to reach safety at the U.S. embassy. As time went on and the Vietnam War no longer corresponded with Rhodes's age, the conflict was retroactively changed to a war in the fictional nation of Siancong. He eventually began working for Stark as a pilot, and the two became friends. When Stark's alcoholism prevents him from fighting the supervillain Magma, Rhodes takes the Iron Man armor and continues the fight. Stark's alcoholism grows worse, and Rhodes takes the armor to become Iron Man. As Iron Man, he resigns from the Avengers and destroys the other Iron Man armors to keep them from being taken by Obadiah Stane.

As Stark begins to recover, Rhodes accompanies him in a new business venture, and they begin sharing the role of Iron Man. Since the armor was not designed for Rhodes, he begins experiencing headaches and mood swings, eventually returning the role to Stark in its entirety. When Stark is believed to be dying, he appoints Rhodes as his successor. Rhodes becomes the CEO of Stark Industries, and he becomes the new Iron Man using the War Machine armor. He gives up the role when he discovers that Stark faked his death, but he keeps the War Machine armor on Stark's insistence. Becoming a new superhero, War Machine, Rhodes briefly joins the West Coast Avengers and then becomes a solo superhero after the team is disbanded. When human rights activist Vincent Cetewayo is kidnapped by his corrupt government in the fictional African country of Imaya, War Machine partners with Deathlok to stage an extralegal intervention and topple the government, despite protest from S.H.I.E.L.D. and the Avengers. In response, Stark disables the War Machine armor until he needs Rhodes's assistance to defeat the Mandarin. Rhodes retires from superhero work, and he briefly runs a salvage business until he finds himself investigating the death of his sister. He then works as a combat instructor for the Sentinel Squad.

When Rhodes is injured in a terrorist attack, he is augmented with cybernetic body parts, permanently turning him into War Machine. He travels to the fictional Middle Eastern country Aqiria, where he encounters a military contractor who tortures and experiments on prisoners. Rhodes takes action without authorization, and he is put on trial for committing war crimes. His cybernetic body is destroyed in the subsequent jailbreak, but a cloned version of his healthy body had been made and his mind is transferred into it. Rhodes later takes on a new title, Iron Patriot, wearing armor in the national colors of the United States. In this new role, he goes to New Orleans, where he assesses the environmental risk posed against the city. He also rejects any further alignment with the military, unless it is purely in the capacity of domestic action or rescue operations. Rhodes is killed in a fight against Thanos, triggering a schism within the superhero community. He is later resurrected by Stark, who had discovered that his body could be restored due to the various augmentations that he had undergone while using the Iron Man armor.

=== Personality and motivations ===
Rhodes is moralistic relative to Stark, divesting Stark Industries from nuclear technology as CEO over objections from the board and taking action against foreign nations without regard for legalities. He takes actions that he believes to be right even when others believe it to be ill-advised, and he believes in ideals of "freedom and love". He is willing to give the benefit of the doubt to other characters as opposed to Stark's brasher approach. This aspect of his character was emphasized in the 2014 series Iron Patriot, which contrasted his sense of moral duty with his responsibility to his family. Writer Christos Gage described War Machine as someone who prefers to lead soldiers into battle rather than deploy them.

When Rhodes first experienced the power of the Iron Man armor, he developed an addiction to it that mirrored Stark's addiction to alcohol that necessitated his replacement. As a superhero, Rhodes pledged to help anyone without regard for race, nationality, or beliefs. His opposition to discrimination also included discrimination against mutants. He believes that the role of superheroes goes beyond fighting supervillains and that they should also take action against global problems such as world hunger and oppressive governments.

=== Themes and motifs ===
War Machine is an African American superhero in a genre that historically presented white characters as the default without meaningfully portraying the lives or worldviews of racial minorities. Rhodes's origin, a black boy who left the ghetto to enlist in the military, reflected conservative sentiments in the late 1970s that African Americans should seek betterment through individual agency and that the military was a place where success was based on merit rather than race. His unsuccessful tenure as Iron Man similarly reflected the conservative belief that racial minorities were harmed by sudden increases in power. Conversely, his tenure as CEO of Stark Industries and his second tenure as Iron Man in 1992 reflected the increased acceptance of African Americans being depicted in popular culture. This depiction put him on a more equal ground to Stark, portraying Rhodes as a capable CEO and hero in his own right. When Rhodes became the main character of Iron Man, he faced many of the same obstacles as Stark, and many of the same themes were explored. Rhodes allowed these issues to be explored from a different perspective, of a character who diverged from the realism associated with Stark's Iron Man and whose views were influenced by his African American identity. In the 1990s, Rhodes was one of several African American characters whose comics incorporated imagery associated with African American culture. Unlike other black Marvel heroes such as Falcon and Cloak, Rhodes's race is not explicitly invoked as a defining aspect of his character or a common source of conflict.

Rhodes's relationship with Stark evokes ideas of control and agency. Stark has control over the armor that Rhodes wears, and this becomes even more apparent when Stark installs the armor through cybernetics as part of Rhodes's body. During Rhodes's earliest outings in the Iron Man armor, he was pretending to be Stark rather than acting independently with his own identity. This was somewhat addressed when Rhodes received his own standalone series, but the nature of the character inherently ties his identity to that of Iron Man. Their relationship also has a racial component, as Stark, the man in control of Rhodes's destiny, is white. Despite this, any possible racial conflict between the two is not addressed explicitly.

War Machine writer Len Kaminski intentionally challenged the violent imagery of a heavily armed character named War Machine by focusing on themes related to global human rights and liberal internationalism. He described the decision saying that "it could subvert some of the people who might be attracted to it for all the wrong reasons, and maybe [the writers will] get them thinking". Rhodes is contrasted with Stark in his sense of responsibility. His backstory as a soldier became relevant in the 2000s when the United States engaged in the controversial Iraq War, and the character was used to explore ideas relating to such wars.

== Powers and abilities ==
Rhodes becomes a superhero by using the War Machine armor. His first version of this armor, the "Variable Threat Response Battle Suit", was equipped with heavy weapons for more direct combat than the standard Iron Man armor. The armor uses a black and gray color scheme; it was originally going to be changed to blue and gold after its debut appearance, but the black and silver design was popular enough that it was retained. Following the destruction of the War Machine armor during a 1995 issue of War Machine, he adopts an extraterrestrial biological armor, the Eidolon Warwear. Stark builds a new War Machine armor directly into Rhodes's body after he sustains serious injuries. This was eventually replaced when Rhodes inhabited a healthy cloned body. As of 2010, Marvel Comics described his armor as giving him the power to lift 100 tons and to fly at Mach 2. Besides his armor, Rhodes's history in the military includes combat training and experience, as both a soldier and a pilot.

== Supporting characters ==
Rhodes was initially created as a supporting character for Tony Stark. They began as friends, but their relationship became more acrimonious as they adjusted to Rhodes's status as a superhero. After Rhodes was acclimated to using the War Machine armor, their shared experiences created a sense of trust between them, and Rhodes became one of Stark's closest allies. Rhodes has fought many of Stark's enemies, including Mandarin, Radioactive Man, and Thunderball. War Machine has adopted several of Stark's allies as his own supporting characters, including Suzi Endo and Bethany Cabe. He has also formed alliances with new partners, including Parnell Jacobs, Glenda Jacobs, and Jake Oh. Parnell Jacobs, established as a friend-turned-enemy of Rhodes, acquired War Machine armor and used it as a mercenary. He returned as a supporting character in volume two of War Machine when Rhodes called on him as an ally, given his experience with the War Machine armor. The title of War Machine has also been used by the Punisher, who acquired the armor in the limited series Punisher: War Machine.

Carol Danvers, the superhero Captain Marvel and a fellow military veteran, has been the primary romantic interest for Rhodes. The two had a relationship leading up to the Civil War II event and Rhodes's death. They reunited following his resurrection and Danvers's return to Earth, with a brief interruption when Danvers went to the future and realized that Rhodes's daughter was not hers. He has also had relationships with other characters, such as Stark Enterprises public relations director Marcy Pearson and Stark's ex-girlfriend Rae LaCoste. In the 2014 Iron Patriot series, Rhodes's father Terrence and his niece Lila are major supporting characters. The death of his sister Jeanette is a plot point in the 2003 series The Crew.

== Reception and legacy ==
Rhodes has historically taken a secondary role to Iron Man, though War Machine maintained independent popularity among comic book readers at times when Stark's Iron Man was relatively forgotten. War Machine's design fit closely with the aesthetic adopted by comic books in the 1990s. Portrayals of the character have been criticized for the subservient nature of Rhodes's black character to Stark's white character.

== In other media ==
War Machine has been featured as a character in the Marvel Cinematic Universe. This version of Rhodes begins as the military liaison to Stark Industries as well as Tony Stark's best friend, and he serves as the responsible character who acts as a foil to Stark's impulsiveness. He first appeared in the franchise's inaugural film, Iron Man (2008), played by Terrence Howard. Howard was replaced by Don Cheadle, who played the character in Iron Man 2 (2010), Iron Man 3 (2013), Avengers: Age of Ultron (2015), Captain America: Civil War (2016), Avengers: Infinity War (2018), Captain Marvel (2019), Avengers: Endgame (2019), The Falcon and the Winter Soldier (2021), What If...? (2021), and Secret Invasion (2023). Rhodes is set to have his own standalone film in the franchise, titled Armor Wars. Adaptations of War Machine have appeared in various animated television series either as a supporting character to Iron Man or in guest appearances on programs about other Marvel superheroes.
