= List of Iron Man supporting characters =

A collection of fictional characters appears in American comic books published by Marvel Comics featuring the superhero Iron Man as the main protagonist.

Since the introduction of Iron Man in Tales of Suspense #39 (1963), Iron Man has accumulated a diverse range of supporting characters. They are friends, employees of Tony Stark, and other superheroes. This is a list of them:

== Family ==
Iron Man family tree

Amanda Armstrong	Jude	Edwin Jarvis; Crimson Cowl	Maria Collins Stark (née Carbonell)	Howard Anthony Walter Stark
Freddie Stark
Carol Danvers; Ms. / Captain Marvel	James Rupert "Rhodey" Rhodes; War Machine / Iron Man / Iron Patriot	Sunset Bain; Madame Menace	Anthony E. "Tony" Stark; Iron Man	Virginia "Pepper" Potts; Hera / Rescue / Coast Guard	Arno Stark I Iron Man 2020; Dr. Gregory "Greg" Stark	Morgan Stark; Brass / Ultimo
Gary	Ronnie Williams	Demetrius "Riri" Williams, Sr.	Mark One; A.I. Tony Stark	F.R.I.D.A.Y. & J.A.R.V.I.S.	Richards family	Arno Stark II; Iron Man 2020
Sharon Williams	Riri Williams; Ironheart	Nathaniel "Nate" Richards; Iron Lad / Kang the Conqueror
N.A.T.A.L.I.E.

Character	First appearance	Description
Amanda Armstrong	International Iron Man #5 (Sept. 2016)	Amanda Armstrong is the biological mother of Tony Stark and a famous musician.
Arno Stark	Iron Man #12 (Sept. 2013)	Arno Stark is the brother of Tony Stark and birth son of Howard and Maria Stark.
Edwin Jarvis	Tales of Suspense #59 (Nov. 1964)	Jarvis is the loyal household butler to the Stark family. He also served the Avengers.
Howard Stark	Iron Man #28 (Aug. 1970)	Howard Stark is Tony Stark's father. He was CEO of Stark Industries and an inventor that built devices that have revolutionized the industrial world.
Maria Stark	Iron Man #104 (Nov. 1977)	Maria Stark is Tony Stark's mother. She is a socialite, philanthropist and married to Howard Stark
Morgan Stark	Tales of Suspense #68 (Aug. 1965)	Morgan Stark is the cousin of Tony Stark.
Mephisto	Avengers vol. 8 #31 (Feb. 2020)	The Howard Stark of Earth-411 sold Tony's soul to Mephisto.

== Family from other media ==
- Gregory Stark – Tony Stark's older twin brother in Ultimate Marvel Universe. He's part of the Avengers Project led by Nick Fury.
- Morgan Stark – Morgan Stark is the daughter of Tony Stark and Pepper Potts in the Marvel Cinematic Universe film Avengers: Endgame (2019). Lexi Rabe portrayed Morgan Stark.
- Andros Stark – Andros Stark is the grandson of Tony Stark in Iron Man: Armored Adventures. He went back in time from the year 2099 to protect the future.

== Supporting characters ==
- Abraham "Abe" Zimmer – Abe Zimmer was a senior member of Stark Enterprises board of directors and trustee of Tony Stark's corporate assets.
- Andy Bhang – Former Chief Robotics of Stark Unlimited, currently the owner of Bang Robotics.
- Bambina Arbogast – Bambina Arbogast is the former executive assistant to Tony Stark at Stark International.
- Bethany Cabe – Bethany Cabe is Tony Stark's former girlfriend and Chief of Security at Stark Unlimited. She possess gymnastic abilities and was highly trained in hand-to-hand combat.
- Doctor Shapiro – Doctor Shapiro is a hyper-intelligent cat working for Stark Unlimited, as an expert in superhuman biology.
- Eddie March – Eddie March is a boxer and friend to Tony Stark.
- F.R.I.D.A.Y. – An artificial intelligence that would appear as a hologram and act as Tony Stark's secretary.
- Guardsman – Kevin O'Brien was head of the research department at Stark Industries and a close friend of Tony Stark. However, after building the Guardsman armor, Kevin O'Brien became an adversary to Iron Man.
- Halcyon – A deaf mutant street racer and engineer with the power to control his heartbeat.
- Happy Hogan – Hired by Tony Stark as his chauffeur and personal assistant after Happy saves Tony's life.
- H.O.M.E.R. – Heuristically Operative Matrix Emulation Rostrum. An artificial intelligence in charge of all of Tony Stark's secret manufacturing projects.
- Ho Yinsen – A medical genius and pacifist. Plays a key role in Iron Man's origin story as a mentor and co-builder of his first armor.
- J.A.R.V.I.S. – The program that helps operate Pepper Potts's Rescue suit.
- Jocasta – Built by the robot Ultron, she aided the Avengers. Jocasta later became the Chief Robotics Ethicist at Stark Unlimited.
- Maria Hill – Becomes a core member of Stark's S.H.I.E.L.D. cabinet and assists Stark in dealing with a sudden rise in various terrorist groups.
- Michael O'Brien – Michael O'Brien was a police sergeant who believed Iron Man was responsible for his brother's death. After fighting Iron Man as the Guardsman, he discovered his mistake and eventually became an ally to Iron Man.
- Maya Hansen – A scientist who developed the Extremis virus along with Aldrich Killian. She is an old friend of Stark.
- Pepper Potts – Originally a member of Tony Stark's secretarial pool. She later becomes part of a love triangle with Tony Stark and Happy Hogan.
- Sal Kennedy – Sal Kennedy is a friend and mentor for Tony Stark and Maya Hansen.
- Toni Ho – Dr. Toni Ho is an engineer and daughter of Ho Yinsen who wore the Iron Patriot armor as a member of the U.S.Avengers.
- Riri Williams – Riri is a young girl who created her own version of the Iron Man Armour suit and is mentored by Tony Stark.
- War Machine – James Rhodes is a pilot who helped Iron Man flee from the Viet Cong soldiers after his escape from Wong-Chu's prison camp. He would later become Tony Stark's best friend and wear his own power armor.

== Love interests ==
- Amara Perera – Dr. Amara Perera is a brilliant biophysicist who developed a cure for the mutant gene that theoretically prevented Mutants from receiving their abilities. Amara was the girlfriend of Tony Stark, who would later leave him for Victor Von Doom.
- Black Widow - First introduced as a Russian spy and as a villain of Stark himself. She would later redeem herself joining the S.H.I.E.L.D. and later becoming a member of the Avengers.
- Cassandra Gillispie – Cassandra Gillespie was the daughter of a weapons manufacturer rival of Howard Stark. Cassandra and Tony Stark were seeing each other when he was studying at University of Cambridge. Years later, Tony Stark crossed paths with Cassandra when he was trying to find out about his true parentage.
- Madame Masque – Whitney Frost is an occasional love interest, enemy of Iron Man and the daughter of Count Nefaria. Her birth name is Giuletta Nefaria. Raised as a wealthy socialite, Whitney Frost wore a golden mask to cover up her disfigured face and continues to do so after her face was healed due to paranoia.
- Indries Moomji – Indries Moomji was the girlfriend of Tony Stark who was recruited by Obadiah Stane as the Queen in his group the Chessmen. She seduced Tony Stark and played a role leading to his downfall.
- Rumiko Fujikawa – Girlfriend of Tony Stark and daughter of Kenjiro Fujikawa, the man who had taken over Stark's company during his stay in the Heroes Reborn universe.
- Sunset Bain – Sunset Bain met Tony Stark when they were MIT undergraduate. She seduced him into revealing the security codes for Stark Industries and stole several prototypes. Shortly thereafter, Sunset founded Baintronics and broke it off with Tony Stark. She assumed the Madame Menace persona to make underground arms deals while Baintronics minted a spotless reputation.
- Wasp – Wasp (Janet Van Dyne) founded the Avengers with Iron Man and had a significant relationship with him twice.
- Patsy Walker/Hellcat - In Christopher Cantwell's run of Iron Man, Patsy serves as Tony's love interest. Tony even proposes to her, though she turns him down.
- Emma Frost - During the Fall of X storyline, Stark was called over by Emma Frost to put a stop to Sebastian Shaw's plans. However, in the middle of their business partnership, Stark and Frost fell in love and got married.

== Allies ==
- The Avengers
  - Captain America
  - Thor
  - Hank Pym
  - Wasp (Nadia Pym)
  - Hulk
  - Quicksilver
  - Scarlet Witch
  - Hawkeye
  - Black Panther
  - Black Widow (Natasha Romanova)
  - Falcon
  - Mar-Vell
  - Captain Marvel
  - Scott Lang
  - Vision
  - Hercules
  - Black Knight
  - Blade
  - Robbie Reyes
- S.H.I.E.L.D.
  - Nick Fury
  - Maria Hill
  - Jasper Sitwell
- West Coast Avengers
  - Hawkeye
  - Mockingbird
  - Wonder Man
  - Thing
  - Hank Pym
  - Moon Knight
  - Firebird
  - Wasp
  - Scarlet Witch
  - Vision
  - U.S. Agent
  - Human Torch
  - Quicksilver
  - Machine Man
  - Living Lightning
  - Spider-Woman
  - Darkhawk
- Mighty Avengers
  - Ms. Marvel
  - Wonder Man
  - Black Widow
  - Sentry
  - Ares
- New Avengers
  - Captain America
  - Luke Cage
  - Spider-Man
  - Wolverine
  - Sentry
  - Echo
  - Spider-Woman
  - Doctor Strange
  - Iron Fist
  - Ronin
- Fantastic Four / Future Foundation
  - Mister Fantastic (Reed Richards)
  - The Thing (Ben Grimm)
  - Invisible Woman (Susan Storm)
  - Human Torch (Johnny Storm)
  - Franklin Richards
  - Valeria Richards
- Illuminati
  - Mister Fantastic (Reed Richards)
  - Black Bolt
  - Doctor Strange
  - Black Panther
  - Professor X
  - Namor
  - Beast
- Guardians of the Galaxy
  - Star-Lord
  - Gamora
  - Rocket Raccoon
  - Drax the Destroyer
  - Groot
  - Mantis
  - Moondragon
- Force Works
  - War Machine
  - Century
  - Cybermancer
  - Moonraker
  - Scarlet Witch
  - Spider-Woman (Julia Carpenter)
  - U.S. Agent
  - Quake
  - Mockingbird
  - Wonder Man
- All-New All-Different Avengers
  - Falcon
  - Jane Foster
  - Kamala Khan
  - Nova (Sam Alexander)
  - Miles Morales

== See also ==
- List of Iron Man enemies
- List of Captain America enemies
