= Iron Man 2020 (event) =

2020 Marvel Comics Event

- Publisher: Marvel Comics
- Publication date: January – August 2020
- Main character(s): Iron Man; Arno Stark; War Machine; Pepper Potts; Jocasta; Machine Man; Sunset Bain; A.I. Army; Ironheart; Force Works

Creative team
- Writer: Dan Slott
- Artist: Pete Woods
- Penciller: Pete Woods
- Editor: Tom Brevoort

"Iron Man 2020" is a storyline published by Marvel Comics in 2020 which follows the character Arno Stark as he attempts to take over Stark Industries and the mantle of his estranged brother Tony Stark (Iron Man).

The crossover characters of two different brands meeting up in one storyline received mixed reviews from critics.

== Publication history ==
Marvel Comics released the teaser for the event at New York Comic Con in November 2019. It was also alluded to in December 2019's Incoming!

In the original checklist released for the event, 2020 Force Works was originally titled Force Works 2020, while 2020 Machine Man was previously named Machine Man 2020, and so on. Additionally, 2020 Wolverine was going to be called Weapon.EXE 2020.

The publication of this event was intended to span from January to June 2020, however, due to the COVID-19 pandemic, Diamond Comic Distributors suspended the distribution of new print titles between April 1 and May 27, which also caused digital releases by Marvel Entertainment to be postponed. The rescheduling of the postponed issues to new dates pushed the event's conclusion to August, and certain issues, namely 2020 Force Works #3 and 2020 Ironheart #1–2, were released exclusively in a digital format.

== Main plot ==
Arno Stark wakes up from a nightmare involving the Extinction Entity, a monstrous amalgamation of alien and machine. He dreams that the Extinction Entity is going to come to Earth in a matter of weeks and create an artificial intelligence (A.I.) army to consume humanity. After eating breakfast with duplicates of Howard Stark and Maria Stark, Arno suits up as Iron Man and saves a construction worker from a hostage situation involving several Nick Fury Life Model Decoys, which represent the A.I. army trying to liberate construction robots. Over different news outlets, the media wonders about the whereabouts of Tony Stark, who declared himself as nothing more than a simulation of the real, late Tony Stark. At the A.I. army's base, Machine Man is commanding the robots' moves when Arno appears, having planned for the A.I. army's leader to show himself. Machine Man activates the bomb, forcing Arno to fly it away so it explodes somewhere safe while he escapes. Machine Man reaches the Thirteenth Floor, a dimensional-shunted plane of existence made of solid light, and a haven for robotkind that humans cannot access or comprehend. Aaron meets with the leader of the A.I. army and creator of Thirteenth Floor: Tony Stark -- who is now going by the name Mark One, having embraced his nature as artificial intelligence. Also in the A.I. army are Albert, Awesome Android, H.E.R.B.I.E., Machinesmith, and Quasimodo.

The A.I. army continues its efforts to liberate artificial life forms by raiding places where robots are being subjugated. Iron Man intercepts an attack on a Futura Motors testing site by Quasimodo and H.E.R.B.I.E. and manages to recover an Un-Inhibitor allowing him to take control of all A.I.s. On the Thirteenth Floor, Mark One receives a transmission from a mole inside Baintronics -- codenamed Ghost in the Machine --revealing that Arno used the submission code on Jocasta, who received a new body, making her entirely compliant. Stark plans to upload the submission code to the internet to instantly infect robots. With only three hours before the code is transmitted to Stark Unlimited's satellite network, Mark One devises a heist on Bain Tower to tamper with the code before launch. Having discovered the secret behind the Thirteenth Floor, Arno shuts out the A.I. army, uses Jocasta to lure Machine Man away from the tower, infects Machinesmith with the submission code, and confronts Mark One.

H.E.R.B.I.E., Awesome Android, and Machinesmith escape from Bain Tower and call for help to every robot in New York City. Mark One is left to fight Iron Man and is defeated. Meanwhile, Sunset Bain confronts and fires Andy Bhang under the accusation of working as a mole inside Stark Unlimited and feeding Bethany Cabe information to relay to the A.I. army. Arno takes Mark One inside Bain Tower to meet Howard and Maria Stark and asks Tony to join him, but he refuses and dismisses his rationale as lunacy. The robotic mob assembled by Machine Man reaches Bain Tower, giving Mark a distraction which allows him to fly off and disable the transmission dish from which Arno intends to broadcast the obedience O.S. to subjugate every robot. Tony manages to stop the upload and make the antenna unusable. In retaliation, Arno fires all of his armor's firepower at Tony as he falls to the ground.

Tony Stark's remaining allies escape with his body as Arno attacks the robot protesters. Tony wakes up inside the Thirteenth Floor and is greeted by F.R.I.D.A.Y., who had plucked Tony's consciousness from his body during his fall. In the streets, Arno Stark tracks down Howard and Maria, who die from an illness inherited from Arno. When Sunset Bain objects to Arno creating new bodies for his parents and trying to control people, he reveals she is an A.I., a duplicate of the real Bain whom Arno replaced back when she solicited him to heal a scar on her face. He makes new bodies for Howard and Maria by recreating the Arsenal and Mistress bodies from the eScape. After learning of Arno's new plan, Dr. Shapiro (who is the actual mole) sneaks into a computer and warns F.R.I.D.A.Y. about it. When F.R.I.D.A.Y. relays that only Tony Stark can stop Arno, Tony insists that he is not the real Tony Stark, but is confronted by holographic manifestations of himself in different points of his life, until they all merge into him and he acknowledges that he has always been Tony.

As Arno Stark sets off to the Stark Space Station to install his mind-controlling device to enslave all of humanity, Tony Stark's allies assault the Stark Unlimited HQ, confronting Sunset Bain's duplicate and Arno's Iron Legion. Jocasta uploads a submission code to Bain and they place Tony's body inside a bio-pod that restores his body to normalcy, uploads his consciousness back into his body. Using the Thirteenth Floor's access mechanisms, Tony and his allies reach the Stark Space Station from one of the elevators within. Employing his new Virtual Armor, Tony defeats Arno in combat. When Arno prepares to activate his mind-controlling device, the Extinction Entity suddenly appears.

Arno ultimately defeats the Extinction Entity by willingly assimilating with it, causing it to explode. The entity is revealed to be a delusion caused by Arno's terminal disease, of which he would die by the end of 2020. Unable to stop Arno, Tony placed him in a simulation where he successfully stopped the entity. Afterwards, Jocasta uses the submission code to force Sunset Bain's duplicate to confess all of Baintronics' crimes, also claiming responsibility for tricking Tony into thinking he was an artificial intelligence and pulling the strings of the A.I. Army, putting an end to the robot revolution. Tony gives up Stark Unlimited to Bhang Robotics and he flies off in a new armor, reasserting himself as Iron Man.

== Issues involved ==
=== Main issues ===
- Iron Man 2020 (vol. 2) #1–6

=== Tie-In issues ===
- 2020 Force Works #1–3
- 2020 Iron Age #1
- 2020 Ironheart #1–2
- 2020 Machine Man #1–2
- 2020 Rescue #1–2
- 2020 iWolverine #1–2

== Critical reception ==
According to Comic Book Roundup, the entire crossover received an average score of 6.4 out of 10 based on 36 reviews. William Tucker from ButWhyTho Podcast stated "Iron Man 2020 #6 is an initially exciting end to a great event that eventually feels deflated. There is absolutely nothing wrong with the art, Woods has been incredible throughout, but the ending that Slott and Gage chose to round out an epic tale like this left me feeling cold. And while there were loads of enjoyable cameos, their involvement ultimately didn't seem important to the story as a whole. Which is disappointing, as the rest of the event really was a fun and exciting ride."

Anthony Wendel from MonkeysFightingRobots wrote "The 2020 event seems like it is taking some big risk, and it doesn't inspire a lot of confidence from the start. Iron Man 2020 #1 has set the stakes and shown some very intense players on both sides of the board. Sadly, if it doesn't unfold just the right way, many may feel cheated about defending the path characters are taking."

== Collected editions ==
Title	Material collected	Published date	ISBN
Iron Man 2020: Robot Revolution	Iron Man 2020 (vol. 2) #1–6	October 2020	978-1302920852
Iron Man 2020: Robot Revolution - Force Works	2020 Force Works #1-3, 2020 Machine Man #1-2, 2020 Iron Age #1	November 2020	978-1302925536
Iron Man 2020: Robot Revolution - iWolverine	2020 iWolverine #1–2, 2020 Ironheart #1–2, 2020 Rescue #1–2	November 2020	978-1302925543
Tony Stark: Iron Man by Dan Slott Omnibus	Iron Man 2020 (vol. 2) #1-6 and Tony Stark: Iron Man #1-19, Iron Man (vol. 2) #25	March 2021	978-1302928452
