= Iron Man's armor =

Fictional exoskeleton worn by Iron Man

- Variations of Iron Man's armors, art by Bob Layton

Publication information
- Publisher: Marvel Comics
- First appearance: Tales of Suspense #39 (March 1963)
- Created by: Don Heck; Jack Kirby; Steve Ditko

In story information
- Type: Weapon
- Element of stories featuring: Iron Man, The Avengers

Iron Man's armor is a fictional powered exoskeleton appearing in American comic books published by Marvel Comics. It is built and worn by billionaire Tony Stark when he assumes the identity of the superhero Iron Man. The first armor was created in-story by Stark and Ho Yinsen, and was designed by artist Jack Kirby, first appearing in Tales of Suspense #39 (March 1963).

In the fictional multiverse, the appearance of Stark's armor has changed over the years. Stark has modified or optimized the armor to adapt to specific situations. As various artists have depicted Iron Man and his armor, its appearance has changed over time.

== Overview ==
Stark's suits are each unique in design and purpose. They are made of incredibly strong, fictional materials bolstered by a force field. Every suit has a self-contained environment, assorted onboard weapons systems, enhanced strength, thruster-aided flight, and various communications arrays and sensors, such as radar and radio.

== Creation ==
While Tony Stark himself was designed by Don Heck, the designer of the character's first gray suit of armor in 1963 was Jack Kirby. It was recolored gold for the character's initial batch of adventures in Tales of Suspense, before being redesigned again by Steve Ditko later in the year – this was the first version to feature a red and gold/yellow scheme, which would come to be Iron Man's most recognizable look.

Bob Layton would redesign the character's armor several times during his stint on the book. In 2008 he recalled that editorial directions in 1981 were that going into outer space was "a big deal", and devised the first space-going Iron Man suit with this edict in mind. He later devised the 1985 red and silver/white "Silver Centurion" armor with input from Mark Gruenwald, who directed him to base it along samurai motifs. The 1994 "Modular" armor was designed by Tom Morgan. When writing the title, David Michelinie avoided overuse of stealth technology in the armor. His eventual successor Len Kaminski disagreed, and in 1994 decided the suit's abilities should be boosted drastically. He devised a component system of armor that could be customised according to various missions, and noted he didn't "like to play fast and loose" with the rules of science and technology. This "Modular" armor was designed by Tom Morgan, and was the first that could be converted into a "Hulkbuster" configuration.

In Invincible Iron Man #25 (2010), Stark creates a new armor in the aftermath of the "Stark: Disassembled" storyline. Created by writer Matt Fraction and artist Ryan Meinerding, this new armor is sleeker in appearance, and is featured in the 2010 crossover storyline the "Heroic Age". When writer Tom Taylor and artist Yildiray Cinar created the "Endo-Sym Armor" in 2014, they designed it to glow red/orange when Tony was angry.

== Fictional history ==
The first Iron Man armor was created by Stark with the help of Ho Yinsen in issue 39 of Tales of Suspense, which he used to escape captivity. After his escape, Stark created a new version with a wide array of improvements; it was colored gold in this second version. He would then change up the color scheme to a mixture of red and gold, which would become a staple of the armor's appearance throughout successive iterations, before briefly being changed to an armor colored red and silver in the 1980s, before returning to the red and gold color scheme during the Armor Wars storyline, with only the occasional change in color scheme for specific armors and storylines, after which he invariably returns to the "classic" red and gold colors.

=== Bleeding Edge Armor ===
After defeating Norman Osborn in 2010, Stark creates a new "Bleeding Edge" Iron Man suit to replace the Extremis version. Asked whether the Bleeding Edge is an upgrade to Extremis, Stark says, "Nah — this is what comes next." The new armor is a part of Stark's now-posthuman biology; it is stored inside Stark's body, "manifesting" itself when mentally commanded. The neurokinetic user-controlled morphologic nanoparticle bundles that form the suit reside in Stark's body, and form a fibrous wetweb of iron and platinum, that can be commanded to form any type of structure upon Stark's skin, such as large boxing gloves, or weapons, including large guns extending from his arms or a lightsaber-like energy sword with which Iron Man was able to harm one of the Worthy. The nano-machines can mimic the appearance of clothes, then dissociate to transform into the Iron Man armor as Stark wishes. The suit adds less than 25 pounds to Stark's body mass. It can stop a howitzer shell.

The armor and Stark's own transhuman body are powered by the high-yield arc reactor mounted in his chest. The reactor augments Stark's intelligence and enables superhuman multitasking and learning. Unlike earlier armors, this new armor does not appear to rely on motors and servos for motion. Instead, the nano-machines create a secondary artificial musculature over Stark's body, upon which additional rigid structures are assembled. This also enables the armor to self-repair and be almost invulnerable, as the armor is capable of transforming and healing itself as long as the power output from the arc reactor is not interrupted or terminated; when the armor is briefly apparently destroyed in a fight with an alternate version of the Scarlet Witch, it is restored to normal after only a matter of seconds (although it remains inactive long enough to require Spider-Man to rescue Stark from plummeting to the ground). In the 2012 "Ends of the Earth" storyline, Doctor Octopus disables the armor using technology derived from the armor of Iron Man 2020.

The suit's repulsor rays, which are located around the knuckles, chest, back, and legs of the armor, as well as in the traditional palms, also function as cameras or "eyeballs", which afford Stark a 360-degree panoramic view. Temporarily replacing the suit's primary composite—iron/platinum—with carbon nanotubes renders it immune to Magneto's powers when he and Iron Man fight over Utopia.

After Stark decides to retire as Iron Man, he undergoes a surgical procedure that expels the Bleeding Edge technology from his body, rendering the armor inert.

== List of armors ==
In 2008, Marvel issued a handbook called All-New Iron Manual, which issued model numbers to the various armor suits that had been seen in the comics up to that point. When the guide was printed in trade paperback alongside the Iron Manual, the numbering of the armors was revised so that the Model 14 listed in the original printing was now a sub-model of Model 13. Since then other guidebooks have named several newer models, although most armors featured since 2016 have not received official designations.

List of Iron Man armors
| Model | Debut | Name | Notes |
|---|---|---|---|
| Model 01 | Tales of Suspense #39 (1963) | | Build with the aid of Ho Yinsen in captivity |
| Model 01 Mark II | Tales of Suspense #40 (1963) | Golden Avenger | Revised version |
| Model 02 | Tales of Suspense #48 (1963) | | First to use red and gold color scheme; a lightweight suit devised to combat Mister Doll |
| Model 03 | Tales of Suspense #56 (1964) | | Also later piloted by Happy Hogan |
| Model 04 | Tales of Suspense #85 (1967) | | Created to rescue Happy Hogan from the Mandarin; also later piloted by James Rhodes |
| Model 05 | Iron Man #142 (1981) | Space Armor | Space capable, created to battle the Sunturion |
| Model 06 | Iron Man #218 (1987) | Hydro Armor | Subsea capable |
| Model 07 | Iron Man #152 (1981) | Stealth Armor | Created to infiltrate Heaven's Hand Fortress in East Germany |
| Model 08 | Iron Man #200 (1985) | Silver Centurion Armor | Created to defeat Obadiah Stane's Iron Monger armor |
| Model 09 | Iron Man #231 (1988) | | First used at the conclusion of the Armor Wars |
| Model 10 | Iron Man #278 (1992) | Space Armor | Used during Operation: Galactic Storm |
| Model 11 | Iron Man #281 (1992) | War Machine Armor | Later used by James Rhodes as War Machine |
| Model 12 | Iron Man #290 (1993) | Neuromimetic Telepresence Unit-150 | Operated by telepresence |
| Model 13 | Iron Man #300 (1994) | Modular Armor | Capable of converting into a Hulkbuster configuration |
| Model 14 | Iron Man #318 (1995) | Arctic Armor | |
| Model 15 | Iron Man #319 (1995) | | |
| Model YT1 | Iron Man #328 (1996) | | Created by a teenage version of Tony Stark from Earth-96020 |
| Model CE1 | Iron Man (vol. 2) #1 (1996) | Prometheum Armor | Created on Counter-Earth |
| Model 16 | Iron Man (vol. 3) #1 (1998) | Renaissance Armor | Created after Tony Stark's return from Counter-Earth |
| Model 17 | Fantastic Four (vol. 3) #15 (1999) | Experimental Safe Armor | Space capable |
| Model 18 | Iron Man: Bad Blood #4 (2000) | Outer Atmospheric Armor | Space capable |
| Model 19 | Iron Man (vol. 3) #42 (2001) | S.K.I.N. Armor | Flexible alloy shell |
| Model 20 | Iron Man (vol. 3) #50 (2002) | | |
| Model 21 | Black Panther (vol. 3) #44 (2002) | Stealth Armor | Created to combat the Black Panther |
| Model 22 | Iron Man (vol. 3) #64 (2003) | Thorbuster Armor | Created to combat Thor |
| Model 23 | Iron Man (vol. 3) #71 (2003) | Ablative Armor | |
| Model 24 | Iron Man (vol. 3) #73 (2003) | | Used when serving as the United States Secretary of Defense |
| Model 25 | Iron Man (vol. 3) #74 (2004) | | Replacement for Model 24 |
| Model 26 | The Incredible Hulk (vol. 3) #71 (2004) | Anti-Radiation Armor | Co-created with Bruce Banner |
| Model 27 | Iron Man (vol. 3) #83 (2004) | High Gravity Suit | Space capable |
| Model 28 | Iron Man: Hypervelocity #1 (2007) | | Used by the artificial intelligence Tony Stark 2.0 |
| Model 29 | Iron Man (vol. 4) #4 (2005) | Extremis Armor | Partly incorporated into Stark's body via an Extremis virus strain |
| Model 30 | Iron Man (vol. 4) #7 (2006) | Battle Argonaut | Only used by remote before its destruction |
| Model 31 | Iron Man (vol. 4) #7 (2006) | Hulkbuster Argonaut | Only used by remote before its destruction |
| Model 32 | Iron Man (vol. 4) #7 (2006) | Subterranean Argonaut | Only used by remote before its destruction |
| Model 33 | Iron Man (vol. 4) #7 (2006) | Submarine Argonaut | Only used by remote before its destruction |
| Model 34 | Iron Man (vol. 4) #7 (2006) | Stealth Argonaut | Only used by remote before its destruction |
| Model 35 | Wolverine (vol. 3) #45 (2006) | Hydro Armor | Stolen by Wolverine |
| Model 36 | World War Hulk #1 (2007) | Hulkbuster Armor | Created to combat the Hulk |
| Model 37 | Invincible Iron Man (vol. 2) #25 (2010) | Bleeding Edge Armor | |
| Model 38 | Avengers vs. X-Men #5 (2012) | Phoenix-Killer Armor | Created to combat the Phoenix Force |
| Model 39 | Invincible Iron Man #517 (2012) | | |
| Model 40 | Invincible Iron Man #523 (2012) | Black Armor | |
| Model 41 | Invincible Iron Man #527 (2012) | | Space capable |
| Model 42 | Iron Man (vol. 5) #1 (2012) | | |
| Model 43 | Iron Man (vol. 5) #3 (2012) | Stealth Armor | |
| Model 44 | Iron Man (vol. 5) #4 (2012) | Heavy Duty Armor | |
| Model 45 | Iron Man (vol. 5) #5 (2012) | Deep Space Armor | Used when a member of the Guardians of the Galaxy |
| Model 46 | Iron Man (vol. 5) #15 (2012) | | |
| Model 47 | Iron Man (vol. 5) #15 (2012) | | |
| Model 48 | Iron Man (vol.5) #24 (2014) | Cold Iron Armor | |
| Model 49 | Original Sin #3.1 (2014) | | |
| Model 50 | The Avengers (vol. 5) #32 (2014) | Endo-Sym Armor | Based on symbiote technology |
| Model 51 | Invincible Iron Man (vol. 3) #1 (2015) | Model-Prime Armor | |
| Model 52 | All-New, All-Different Avengers #1 (2015) | Hulkbuster Armor | |
| | Unbeatable Squirrel Girl Beats Up the Marvel Universe #1 (2016) | | Created to combat Squirrel Girl |
| | Spider-Man (vol. 2) #9 (2016) | | Created to combat Captain Marvel |
| | Hunt for Wolverine: Dead Ends #1 (2018) | | |
| | Tony Stark: Iron Man #1 (2018) | | |
| | Tony Stark: Iron Man #1 (2018) | Fin Fang Foombuster Armor | Created to combat Fin Fang Foom |
| | Tony Stark: Iron Man #1 (2018) | Nano Iron Man Armor | |
| | Tony Stark: Iron Man #2 (2018) | | |
| | Tony Stark: Iron Man #4 (2018) | | |
| | The Avengers (vol. 8) #5 (2018) | Godkiller Armor Mk. II | |
| | The Avengers (vol. 8) #9 (2018) | | Subsea capable |
| | Tony Stark: Iron Man #10 (2019) | Godbuster Armor | |
| | Tony Stark: Iron Man #14 (2019) | | |
| | Tony Stark: Iron Man #16 (2019) | Ultronbuster Armor | |
| | The Avengers (vol. 8) #31 (2020) | Ice Armor | |
| | Tony Stark: Iron Man #19 (2019) | | Created by Arno Stark |
| | Iron Man 2020 (vol. 2) #5 (2020) | Virtual Armor | |
| | Iron Man 2020 (vol. 2) #6 (2020) | | |
| Model 70 | Iron Man (vol. 6) #1 (2020) | | |
| | Hulk (vol. 5) #1 (2021) | Hulkbuster Armor | |
| | Thor (vol. 6) #25 (2021) | Hulkbuster Armor | |

== In other media ==
=== 1994 animated series ===
As noted above, Iron Man's Modular armor was his standard suit for his appearance in the 1990s Iron Man animated series, but with a slightly modified face plate to give it the traditional mouth-slit. The suit was redesigned in the second season of the series, most significantly by restoring the "mouthless" appearance of the armor.

The trademark of a changing armor remained a constant in the animated series, with the first season featuring the hydro-armor and deep space armor from the comics. The second season, however, was when the variant armors became a focal point of the series; the new modifications that Stark made to his suit allowed it to shapeshift into different forms with specialized capabilities that could be called upon for the assorted situations that he found himself in. The hydro-armor and space armors were incorporated into this mechanism, and more armors from the comics such as the stealth armor and the Hulkbuster armor were introduced. The series also introduced an array of original situational armor designs, including:

- Subterranean drill armor – Brown and gold, with an arm-mounted pneumatic drill for burrowing
- Inferno armor – Red and gold with pink highlights, this armor was resistant to extreme temperatures and outfitting with fire-extinguishing foam.
- Samurai armor – Never used in combat, this highly stylized armor was blue and gray
- Radiation armor – Blue and silver armor to shield against radioactive danger, capable of firing x-ray blasts
- Lava armor – Red and silver armor that can resist extreme heat.
- Magnetic armor – Purple and silver, with the ability to generate electromagnetic pulses, once used by a microscopically reduced Iron Man to fibrillate Hawkeye's heart
- Bio-energy armor – DNA-powered red and gold armor, used against the Mandarin's anti-technology field in the two-part series finale "Hands of the Mandarin"
- Hydro armor – Yellow with a glass-domed helmet, used for underwater situations
- Space armor – The space armor is equipped with a jet pack and designed for space travel.
- Stealth armor – Dark gray, used to stay silent and not traceable by radar
- Destroyer armor - A miniature destroyer used against Asgardians.

The toyline also featured two armors which did not appear in the series; an entirely silver Arctic armor and the Silver Centurion suit, dubbed Hologram armor.

=== Fantastic Four: World's Greatest Heroes ===
Several types of Iron Man armors were also featured in the Fantastic Four: World's Greatest Heroes episode "Shell Games". The armors that were featured were the Mark I Armor, Stealth Armor, Hulkbuster Armor, Arctic Armor, War Machine Armor, and Silver Centurion Armor.

=== Iron Man: Armored Adventures ===
Iron Man's original armor in Iron Man: Armored Adventures

In Iron Man: Armored Adventures, a teenage Stark initially creates the first armor completely on his own. It is similar to the film version of the Mark III armor, with a less complex design and more red. In addition to the traditional abilities of the armor (superhuman strength and durability, flight, repulsor rays, and the uni-beam), it is able to generate a force field around it, use magnetic manipulation, and has other various functions, including a remote command system to enable Rhodes to control it from a separate computer terminal if Stark cannot do so, a security system to prevent people from opening it when Stark is unconscious and a secondary wheeled transportation system that enables him to "skate" when the flight system is damaged. The first variation of the armor appears in "Cold War" when he created enhanced thermal gauntlets for his armor and used them to help him fight Blizzard.

New armors then appear in various episodes:

- Silver Centurion Armor: Red and silver, very similar to the original red and gold armor and its own comic counterpart in both appearance and abilities. Stark created it in the episode "Whip Lash", and used it in the same episode to fight the eponymous villain.
- Stealth Armor: Initially similar to the red and gold armor, but with a different chest plate and lights on the sides. The suit can become invisible and undetectable to cameras and sensors, including those used by Stark International. This function eventually burns up the power cells after a short period of time. The armor returned in "Panther's Prey" with a new design that is almost completely bluish-black with red lights on the sides.
- Hulkbuster Armor: A heavy-duty armor designed for maximum strength and endurance at the cost of reduced mobility. It has the ability to redirect energy that is shot at it and has powerful versions of the repulsors and uni-beam as well as missiles and shoulder-mounted Gatling laser blasters.
- Space Armor: A black and gold armor with extended life-support capabilities. It has an expanded propulsion system on the back (twin thrusters) for long-term flight and for flying into and maneuvering through outer space.
- Arctic Armor: A white and gold armor that contains additional systems that project thermal energy from Iron Man's gauntlets and uni-beam. It has greater life-support functions and is resistant to freezing temperatures.
- War Machine Armor: Whereas Stark created the Iron Man armor as a multi-environment suit for exploration and rescue, the War Machine armor was created for fighting. The War Machine is as fast as the Mark I Armor, but it has numerous weapons, more powerful and bulkier than the normal armor. Equipped with more powerful versions of the repulsors and uni-beam, the War Machine also sports three shoulder-mounted missile launchers as well as wrist-mounted machine guns and a shoulder-mounted Gatling laser rifle.
- Iron Man Mark II Armor: In season 2 of the series, Stark creates a more powerful suit of Iron Man armor. Its design possibly originated from the Extremis Armor from the comics and the first season's Silver Centurion Armor. In addition to the enhanced versions of all the systems from the Mark I Armor, it also has wrist-mounted flame blasters, shoulder-mounted missile launchers, sonic disrupters, and more powerful repulsors and uni-beam. Stark controls the Mark II using his Extremis abilities.
- Rescue Armor: Also known as the Stark Solutions X-51 Stealth Infiltrator Armor, the Rescue armor is a purple and white version of the Stealth Armor that was created by Stark for Pepper Potts.
- Hyperpulse Mark 9 Armor: A highly advanced Iron Man armor worn by Andros Stark of the year 2099, that looks like the Cosmic Armor from the comics. This armor uses time travel capabilities, ultra-repulsor blasts, runs on Extremis 16.5, and can create hard light holograms. Andros' AI for this armor is J.A.R.V.I.S.

=== The Avengers: Earth's Mightiest Heroes ===
In The Avengers: Earth's Mightiest Heroes series, Iron Man has several armors, some of which are modeled after the Marvel Cinematic Universe (MCU) depiction of the armor.

- Mark I Armor: The armor is based on the film version, but with full flight capability, repulsor rays, and unibeam.
- Mark II Armor
- Mark VI Armor
- Mark VII Armor: Iron Man's standard armor in the first season; Its design is identical to the Mark VI Armor.
- Mark IX Armor: Iron Man's main armor in the second season. The new suit is based on the Extremis armor and the Mark VI armor from Iron Man 2.
- Classic Armor
- Silver Centurion Armor
- Hulkbuster Armor: A headless exterior unit over Iron Man's standard armor.
- Hulkbuster Armor II: A bulky suit that resembles the mainstream Hulkbuster armor.
- Space Armor
- Arctic Armor
- Stealth Armor.
- Thorbuster Armor: This armor was built by Iron Man and Eitri using uru metal, making its repulsor rays similar to Mjolnir's lightning.

=== Marvel Anime ===
The Iron Man anime series features an Iron Man armor similar to the film's Mark III armor, except that in the anime the armor is only shown to be equipped with repulsor rays, the uni-beam, and mini-rockets. The plot of the series involves Stark traveling to Japan to build an ARC station and also to test a new armor: Iron Man Dio. Stark intends to mass-produce Dio and then retire as Iron Man. The Dio chest power core resembles the one on the Extremis Armor, but the armor is colored blue and silver.

=== The Invincible Iron Man ===
In the 2007 direct-to-DVD film The Invincible Iron Man, Tony Stark and James Rhodes create a gray and bulky suit of armor (similar to the original Iron Man armor that Stark and Yinsen created in the comics) to escape from a cave. After returning to the United States, Stark reveals that he had previously used his company's resources to create several multi-use armors that he had been keeping in storage until the time was right to reveal them to the public.

=== Iron Man: Rise of Technovore ===
In Iron Man: Rise of Technovore, Tony Stark's armor has additional thrusters on its back and feet and small, retractable wings on the shoulder pads. This armor also appears in Avengers Confidential: Black Widow & Punisher.

=== Ultimate Spider-Man ===
In the animated series Ultimate Spider-Man, the episode "The Iron Octopus" reveals several prior suits developed by Stark:

- Mark I Armor
- Mark II Armor
- Mark III Armor
- Hulkbuster Armor
- Classic Armor

=== Hulk and the Agents of S.M.A.S.H. ===
In the animated series Hulk and the Agents of S.M.A.S.H., the episode "Wheels of Fury" reveals several prior suits developed by Stark:

- War Machine Armor
- Mark I Armor
- Silver Centurion Armor
- Stealth Armor

=== Avengers Assemble ===
In the animated series Avengers Assemble, Iron Man's armor has smaller shoulder plates and a helmet modeled after the MCU depiction of the armor. In the fifth season, Iron Man's armor is depicted as sleeker, resembling an amalgamation of the Bleeding Edge and Model-Prime armor.

- Mark XLIX Armor
- Mark L Armor
- "Rubber Ducky" Armor: This armor is designed for underwater operation.
- Mark I Armor
- "Hulkbuster" Armor
- War Machine Armor
- Iron Patriot Armor
- Stealth Armor: A black and gold armor resembling Iron Man's Marvel NOW! armor.
- Undersea Armor II: A dark-colored armor resembling the Mark XXXVII "Hammerhead" from Iron Man 3.
- Iron Kid Armor: An armor used by Iron Man after he is temporarily de-aged to a child. It resembles a small version of his classic armor with the horned visor.
- Asgardian Buster Armor: An armor which resembles Stark's Uru Armor from the 2011 crossover event "Fear Itself".
- A red/gold armor that resembles the Mark VI from Iron Man 2.
- A red/gold armor that resembles the Marvel NOW! Space Armor MK III from the comics.
- Mark II: A metallic silver armor.
- "New Frontiers" Armor: A large armor resembling Iron Man's armor from the Ultimate Marvel imprint.
- New "Hulkbuster" Armor: An armor similar to the Mark XLIV from Avengers: Age of Ultron. Bruce Banner uses a version of the armor, repainted green and gray, after being drained of his gamma radiation and powers.
- Omega Armor: A black, red and gold armor originating from Kang the Conqueror's home timeline.
- "Marsha": A copper-colored truck that Iron Man modified to act as armor while he was hiding in No-Tech Land.
- "Secret Wars" Armor: Iron Man's main armor in the fourth season. It resembles an amalgamation of Iron Man's armors from Captain America: Civil War and Avengers: Infinity War, with heavy artillery, fully retractable helmet and a holographic assembly system.
- Mark 59A Armor: Similar to the main Iron Man armor in Season 5, but built with a titanium-reinforced hardshell and a modulating force bubble.
- Panther Buster Armor: A red and gold armor, much like his main one, but bulkier and taller with a different helmet, chestplate, and arc reactor, which comprises the central circular reactor and multiple, small light-up panels. The armor is equipped with a prototype triple pulse generator, a laser net and a pair of retractable blasters mounted on the back.

=== Iron Man and Hulk: Heroes United ===
In this direct-to-video team-up feature, Tony Stark displays three armors. His initial armor, the "Mark VI", is a slightly bulky hypervelocity armor with a circular uni beam lens. It is somewhat reminiscent of the cinematic Mark III, but with a less complex paint job and more gold color. It is first seen battling a Hulkbuster armor run by J.A.R.V.I.S. in a training exercise. This time, Stark does not wear the Hulkbuster, instead giving the torso armor and the gauntlets to Hulk for extra protection against Zzzax. Stark's final armor is the "Mark VII", an untested prototype that has better chances of defending against Zzzax. The armor resembles the cinematic Mark VI, with gray plating on the knees and arms, but with a pentagonal uni beam instead of a triangular one. The Mark VII is Iron Man's main and only armor in the follow-up animated film Iron Man and Captain America: Heroes United.

=== Marvel Disk Wars: The Avengers ===
In Marvel Disk Wars: The Avengers, Iron Man's armor is almost identical to the cinematic Mark VI, although the name of this model is not stated in the series. Its weaponry and abilities are the standards, with flight capabilities, repulsor rays, missiles, and the uni-beam. In episode 28, Iron Man gains the Build Up Plate, an extra piece of armor worn over his regular one, which grants him more firepower thanks to his Final Repulsor attack.

=== Marvel Future Avengers ===
The standard Iron Man armor featured in Marvel Future Avengers resembles the Mark XLVI from Captain America: Civil War. The suit has prehensile abilities, shown when Tony Stark is able to control a gauntlet individually and then the rest of the pieces form up on him, completing the whole armor. Two additional modular add-ons were shown during the series: the Hulkbuster armor, an add-on donned over his regular armor that looks exactly like the Mark XLIV Hulkbuster from Avengers: Age of Ultron, and the Booster Unit, an add-on with a pair of thrusters and multiple arc reactors on the chestplate and shoulders that enables Iron Man to reach extremely high speeds during flight. The main operating system of the armor is F.R.I.D.A.Y.

=== Marvel's Spider-Man ===
Two different armors appear in Spider-Man (2017): the Mark 49 and 50. The Mark 49 appears to be based on the other armors in the franchise. The Mark 50, however, is mainly red with a gold face mask and collarbone, with a prehensile system.

=== Film ===
Iron Man's armors feature prominently in several films set in the Marvel Cinematic Universe.
