= Sunset Bain =

Fictional comic book character

- Sunset Bain

Publication information
- Publisher: Marvel Comics
- First appearance: Machine Man #17 (October 1980)
- Created by: Tom DeFalco (writer); Steve Ditko (artist)

In-story information
- Alter ego: Sunset Bain
- Species: Human; A.I.
- Team affiliations: New Enforcers
- Notable aliases: Madame Menace
- Abilities: Genius-level intellect; Skilled inventor

Sunset Bain, also known as Madame Menace, is a character appearing in American comic books published by Marvel Comics. Created by writer Tom DeFalco and artist Steve Ditko, the character first appeared in Machine Man #17 (October 1980). Bain is both a rival and occasional love interest of the superhero Tony Stark / Iron Man. She is portrayed as a cunning and ruthless business magnate, serving as the founder and CEO of Baintronics, a powerful technology conglomerate specializing in artificial intelligence and robotics.

Bain attended the Massachusetts Institute of Technology concurrently with Stark, during which she seduced him into revealing the security codes for Stark Industries. Shortly thereafter, she infiltrated the company, stealing blueprints and prototypes that she later used to establish her own corporation. Bain and Stark clashed when he suspected she had used his stolen technology to construct a military vehicle, and their rivalry continued over time. Her primary objective is to dominate the technology market, both legally and illicitly.

== Publication history ==
Sunset Bain debuted in Machine Man #17 (October 1980), created by Tom DeFalco and Steve Ditko. She subsequently appeared in several Marvel series, including Iron Man Annual (1970), Ghost Rider (1973), Web of Spider-Man (1985), Solo Avengers (1987), Spider-Man (1990), Iron Man (1998), Taskmaster (2002), The Punisher War Journal (2006), Marvel Comics Presents (2007), Iron Man: Kiss & Kill (2010), Tony Stark: Iron Man (2018), the "Iron Man 2020" storyline (2020), and Iron Cat (2022). Bain received an entry in the All-New Official Handbook of the Marvel Universe A-Z #1 (2006).

== Fictional character biography ==
Sunset Bain got her start by seducing fellow MIT undergraduate Tony Stark into revealing the security codes for Stark Industries. Shortly thereafter, a force of masked men invaded and stole several prototypes. Within a year, Baintronics was founded and Sunset broke it off with Stark. While Baintronic maintained a spotless reputation, Sunset assumed the Madame Menace persona and sold high-tech weaponry to criminals via "a tremendously profitable underground seasonal "Sharper Villain" catalog of armaments."

When Machine Man lost an arm while fighting Baron Brimstone and the Satan Squad, Madame Menace bought it, obtaining a low price by threatening the seller "with one of her flesh-eating roaches." Her plans for reverse engineering the limb were interrupted when Machine Man came to claim it. Despite her electromagnets and sonic disrupter cannon, Machine Man prevailed, and Sunset had to blow up her yacht to escape. An accidental run-in with Alpha Flight members Aurora, Northstar and Sasquatch eventually persuaded her to set aside her Machine Man machinations for a while.

Having failed to decode the intricacies of Jocasta's A.I., Bain hires Tony Stark to investigate. As Stark was already employed otherwise, Bain hires War Machine to destroy his current employers. After Iron Man defeats Fin Fang Foom, Baintronics takes the contract for transporting Foom. Using this as an in, Bain asks Stark to work for her again. Growing suspicious, Stark accepts in order to learn more. Stark then frees Jocasta and persuades War Machine to stop working for Bain.

During the "Iron Man 2020" arc, Machinesmith informs Machine Man and Quasimodo that Arno Stark and Bain are using Baintronics to acquire a robotics factory and destroy it to prevent the A.I. Army from acquiring new members. Andrew Bhang informs Bain that the robots like animatronic mascots and room-bots are protesting on the streets. While stating that they are heading to Baintronics to tear it down, Bain realizes that Bhang is the A.I. Army's mole and has been feeding information to Bethany Cabe. Bain is later disintegrated by her A.I. counterpart, who dislikes "competition".

== Powers and abilities ==
Sunset Bain prefers to manipulate others into carrying out her schemes rather than engaging in direct combat herself. However, when necessary, she has access to an array of weapons of her own design, including devices such as a sonic disruptor. A genius-level inventor, Bain controls the resources of Baintronics and other affiliated companies, as well as a small contingent of uniformed mercenaries. She generally sells her inventions rather than using them personally.

== Other versions ==
=== Earth-8410 ===
An alternate version of Sunset Bain appears in Machine Man. In this cyberpunk storyline set in the year 2020, an older Bain remains the head of Baintronics, which has leveraged technology from Machine Man and Jocasta to become a dominant megacorporation. After a robot's error frees Machine Man, he battles Baintronics' forces, ultimately defeating Iron Man 2020 and Bain's other guards. Despite being forty years past her prime, Bain attacks Machine Man directly with a live power cable, but he overcomes her and extracts a promise that she will leave him and his allies alone.
