= Marvel Super Hero Squad Online =

2011 video game

- Promotional comic distributed as free handout during E3 2010. Cover motif is a pastiche of Secret Wars #1.
- Engine: Unity
- Platforms: Microsoft Windows, Mac OS X
- Release: April 29, 2011 (US Beta); November 4, 2011 (Europe Beta); November 1, 2012 (server merge)
- Genre: Massively multiplayer online role-playing game

Marvel Super Hero Squad Online was a massively multiplayer free-to-play online game for younger audiences based on the Marvel Super Hero Squad, developed by American video game companies the Amazing Society and Gazillion Entertainment. The open beta version of the game was released on April 29, 2011 (although a closed beta was released in early 2011). It was a freemium in-browser game that offered two types of microtransactions: To purchase in-game currency, or a monthly subscription that gave the player additional perks.

Players collected heroes to form their own Squad. They were able to choose a hero from their Squad to play in a number of games and activities. As they played, the heroes increased not only their power in combat, but unlocked animated emotes for use in the social game world zones. Many characters from the Marvel Universe appeared in Marvel Super Hero Squad Online in a traditional Super Hero Squad "super-deformed" style.

Marvel Super Hero Squad Online was the first MMO game developed in Gazillion's and Marvel's 10-year exclusive game publishing agreement. The second was Marvel Heroes.

Marvel Super Hero Squad Online was shut down on January 11, 2017. Gazillion Entertainment itself shut down on November 22, 2017.

== Gameplay ==
Marvel Super Hero Squad Online had alternate controls, in which with one click the player could move from one place to another, or use the arrow keys or the traditional WASD keys on a keyboard. When the player creates an account and enters the game, they are given four starting heroes: Cyclops, Ms. Marvel, Falcon, and the Thing. The object of the game was to unlock and collect other Marvel heroes so the player can form their own unique superhero team. As an MMORPG, the game is split into 5 primary types of gameplay:

- Zones: These were the games main overworlds for the player to select what they choose to do next. Players may of emoted or have chosen text options to interact with other players in real time using the Marvel heroes as their avatars. The zones included the Daily Bugle, the Baxter Building, and Asgard. A fourth zone titled Villainville was later made available. Certain characters (such as Falcon and Ms. Marvel) could fly, by clicking on blue or green circles on the ground. If the character was unable to fly, that character could have a double jump or a high/long jump.
- Missions: The main form of gameplay that had players choosing a hero and entering a beat 'em up style action-adventure stages, tasked with defeating hordes of enemies to reach the final boss. To attack, players clicked on the enemies or pressed a certain button to perform a special attack. Missions could have been completed solo or with other players, and were unlocked at the in-game shop.
- Headquarters: Each player is given a virtual Headquarters, where they could watch their collected heroes interact with the environment or feed them. The player could have purchased things such as furniture.
- Card Games: A collectible card game was made available to play in early August 2011. The object was to deplete one's opponent's card deck by attacking with their own cards. The opponent could have been either another player in real-time or an NPC. Each card had a uniquely designed illustration and affect, and upon drawing, was accompanied with an often humorous visual in an arena setting.
- Arcade: An arcade was developed where players could play as Deadpool, She-Hulk, Black Panther, Daredevil, Captain America, Thor, Doctor Strange and Jean Grey in selected mini-games. Two characters such as Deadpool and She-Hulk were featured in each mini-game.

The games in-game currency was separated into two compartments: Gold and fractals (originally, called "Silver"). Both gold and fractals could be used to buy other items heroes at the games in-game store, such as other Marvel heroes, the difference being that fractals could be earned over time or from in-game activities while gold had to be purchased with real money as microtransactions. The game made it an incentive to become a Junior SHIELD member, which was a monthly micropayment subscription that gave the player additional rewards.

An achievement system was released that allowed players to complete several challenges such as greeting other players, buying new heroes, beating missions or card game quests. Each challenge completed awarded the player fractals, and a new hero.

The game was released in Europe on November 4, 2011. On November 1, 2012, the European server was merged with the North American server and expanded to encompass more European countries.

=== Characters ===
There were 197 playable characters before January 11, 2017.

Playable characters
Abomination; Agent Coulson^{f}; Agent Venom^{a}; American Dream^{g}; Angel; Archangel; X-Force Archangel; Annihilus^{a}; Anti-Venom; Venom^{f}; Arachne; Beast; Beta Ray Bill^{f}; Black Cat; Black Panther; Black Widow; Avengers Black Widow^{a}; Blade; Cable; Captain America (Bucky Barnes); Winter Soldier^{f}; Captain America (Steve Rogers); Avengers Captain America^{a}; Captain America, Stealth Suit; Captain America, Super-Soldier^{g}; Captain Marvel; Carnage; Colossus^{g}; Cyclops; Astonishing Cyclops^{g}; First Appearance Cyclops; Daredevil^{g}; Armored Daredevil; Classic Daredevil; Shadowland Daredevil; Deadpool^{a}; Pirate Deadpool; X-Force Deadpool; Destroyer^{e}	Doctor Doom^{g}; Future Foundation Doctor Doom^{a}; Doctor Octopus^{f}; Superior Spider-Man; Doctor Strange; Dracula; Drax the Destroyer; Electro; Elektra^{g}; Pure Elektra^{g}; Emma Frost^{g}; Enchantress; Falcon; Falcon Exo-7; Firestar^{g}; Frankenstein; Gambit; Gamora; Ghost Rider; Classic Ghost Rider; Goliath; Green Goblin^{f}; Dark Iron Patriot; Groot; Guardian^{a}; Hank Pym; Ant-Man; Giant-Man; Havok; Hawkeye; Avengers Hawkeye^{a}	Hope Summers^{g}; Hulk; Avengers Hulk^{a}; Gladiator Hulk; Indestructible Hulk^{a}; Mr. Fix-It^{f}; Human Torch; Iceman; Impossible Man; Invisible Woman^{g}; Future Foundation Invisible Woman; Iron Fist; Iron Man (Tony Stark); Arctic Armor Iron Man^{g}; Avengers Iron Man^{a}; Hulkbuster Iron Man^{a}; Iron Man Midas; Iron Man MK I^{a}; Iron Man MK II; Iron Man MK XLII; Iron Man Silver Centurion; Stealth Armor Iron Man^{g}; Iron Man 2020; Iron Monger; Iron Patriot; Jean Grey; Dark Phoenix; Phoenix; White Phoenix^{a}; Juggernaut^{f}; Lizard; Loki^{a}; Avengers Loki; Luke Cage^{g}	Magneto; MODOK^{d}; Monkey King; Moon Knight; Morbius; Mister Fantastic; Future Foundation Mr. Fantastic; Ms. Marvel; Mysterio^{a}; Mystique; Nick Fury; Avengers Nick Fury^{a}; Nightcrawler; Swashbuckler Nightcrawler; Nighthawk; Nova (Richard Rider); Nova (Sam Alexander); Onslaught; Psylocke; X-Force Psylocke; Punisher^{g}; Thunderbolts Punisher; Quicksilver^{a}; Red Hulk; Red She-Hulk; Reptil; Rescue; Rocket Raccoon^{f}; Rogue^{g}; Avenging Rogue; Ronan the Accuser; Sabretooth^{f}; Sasquatch; Sandman; Scarlet Spider^{g}; Spider-Man (Ben Reilly); Scarlet Witch^{g}; Sentry^{g}; Shadowcat^{a}	She-Hulk; Silver Surfer; Dark Surfer; SP//DR; Spider-Girl^{g}; Black Suit Spider-Girl; Spider-Ham^{g}; Spider-Man (Peter Parker); Armored Spider-Man^{g}; Big Time Spider-Man; Black Suit Spider-Man^{a}; Bombastic Bag-Man^{g}; Spider-Man Earth-8351; Ends of the Earth Spider-Man^{a}; First Appearance Spider-Man; Future Foundation Spider-Man^{g}; Iron Spider^{b}; Spider-Man Noir^{g}; Spider-Man 2099; Spider-Woman (Gwen Stacy); Spider-Woman (Jessica Drew)^{g}; Squirrel Girl; Star-Lord^{a}; Storm; Mohawk Storm^{g}; Super-Skrull^{a}; Taskmaster; Thanos^{f}; Thing; Future Foundation Thing; Tuxedo Thing^{a}; Thor^{g}; Avengers Thor^{a}; Battle Armor Thor; Classic Thor^{g}; Ultimate Thor; Tigra; Titanium Man^{f}	Ultimate Spider-Man^{g}; Ultron^{f}; AU Ultron^{c}; Valkyrie^{g}; Vision; War Machine^{a}; War Machine MK II^{e}; Wasp^{g}; Werewolf by Night^{g}; Wolverine; Avenging Wolverine^{a}; Classic Wolverine^{g}; Samurai Wolverine; Street Clothes Wolverine^{g}; X-Force Wolverine; Wonder Man
Bosses
Abomination; Annihilus; Bullseye; Dark Surfer; Doctor Doom; Doctor Octopus	Dormammu; Dracula; Enchantress; Fin Fang Foom; Green Goblin; Impossible Man	Juggernaut; Kingpin; Lizard; Loki; Avengers Loki; Magneto	Malekith; MODOK; Mole Man; Mysterio; Mystique; Onslaught	Red Skull; Sabretooth; Super-Skrull; Surtur; Titanium Man; Ultron	Venom; Wendigo; Winter Soldier; Ymir

- ^a Only available to monthly subscribers.
- ^b Only available after purchasing a one-year subscription.
- ^c Only available after purchasing the $95.95 gold bundle.
- ^d Only available through the in-game achievement system.
- ^e Only available through the in-game crafting system.
- ^f Only available through an in-game Mystery Box purchase.
- ^g Rotation character. Only available periodically for a limited time.

== Reception ==
Commercially and critically, the game underperformed. Erik Dekker of the Dutch gaming website XGN gave the game a negative review, criticizing the frequent coercion of microtransactions, "puppet show" combat areas, and lack of depth to the overall gameplay. Other critics were divided on the presentation, voice acting, and overall appeal.
