= Recorder 451 =

Fictional Marvel Comics character

- Textless cover of Iron Man (vol. 5) #15 (September 2013). Art by Greg Land.

Publication information
- Publisher: Marvel Comics
- First appearance: Iron Man (vol. 5) #6 (February 2013)
- Created by: Kieron Gillen; Greg Land

In-story information
- Species: Rigellian Recorder
- Place of origin: Rigel-3
- Abilities: Genius-level intellect

Recorder 451 is a fictional character who appears in comic books published by Marvel Comics. 451 was a Rigellian Recorder who helped Howard and Maria Stark bring their son (which apparently was Tony Stark but was found to be Arno, with the revelation that Tony was adopted) to life after she almost loses him while pregnant; in exchange, he conducted experiments in the fetus, making it a future genius.

== Publication history ==
Recorder 451 first appeared in Iron Man (vol. 5) #6 (February 2013), and was created by writer Kieron Gillen and artist Greg Land.

Gillen initially intended to use Unit, an enemy of the X-Men, in the comic, but decided against it due to Unit being explicitly evil, while Recorder 451 is morally ambiguous. Gillen described 451 as "a creature of passion, which he tries the hardest to hide. He was a machine built to do exactly the opposite of what he's doing, so every single action is hard for him. His body screams that what he's doing is wrong." Additionally, Gillen described 451's motives as "[understanding] everything that he's doing is wrong but he believes in the end it will be a better world".

== Fictional character biography ==
Recorder 451 is a Rigellian Recorder who had a bug which caused him to retain the memories of what he witnessed after the moment in which his data was collected from him. After eons of observing the universe, he decides to act rather than observing. He discovers an alien race known as the Voldi, who are using a special artifact called the Heart of the Voldi to extract power from the Celestials without them noticing, and decides to steal the heart.

Recorder 451 manipulates Iron Man into traveling to the Voldi Tear, knowing that he is wanted by the Voldi for taking part in the assassination of the Phoenix Force, the Voldi's deity, during the conflict in Avengers vs. X-Men. When Tony Stark is taken captive, Recorder 451 informs him of an ancient Voldi ritual called "Shay-Tah-Run", a trial-by-combat. The event would draw enough attention for Recorder 451 to steal the Iron Man armor from the evidence vault and give it to Tony Stark in order to escape.

Recorder 451 uses the distraction caused by the Shay-Tah-Run to steal the Heart of the Voldi. This exposes the Voldi's existence to the Celestials, who arrive to slaughter them. Both Recorder 451 and Iron Man escape unharmed, but Tony Stark promises to make Recorder 451 pay for his crime.

Recorder 451 hires Death's Head to bring him Tony Stark to an abandoned Badoon ship, where Death's Head explains his history with 451. It is revealed that Recorder 451 came to Earth years ago to stop an alien race called the Greys from destroying humanity, but was captured. He managed to make one of the Greys free him with the help of Howard Stark, Jimmy Woo, Dum Dum Dugan, and Thunderbolt Ross as Howard was looking for a way to help his unborn child live.

After being freed, Recorder 451 reveals the Greys' intention to Howard Stark, and tells him he would need to insert someone in humanity to accelerate the human's technological growth for the moment they would need to face the Greys, and Howard Stark's unborn child was the perfect candidate. Recorder 451 genetically engineers the baby with Kree technology to make the baby someone who would uplift humanity, by modifying his thought process, in order to make him think differently and more practically, so he would focus in advanced weaponry construction.

Back in the present, Recorder 451 reveals that he needs Tony Stark to create a 25,000 feet-tall suit called the Godkiller Armor, which only he can pilot. Tony Stark is about to connect with the armor when Death's Head attacks it, enabling him to escape.

Recorder 451 battles Iron Man - who manages to access to his mobile armory and remotely control other armors - in order to force him pilot the Godkiller, but is unable to hack into his suits. After having his hacking unit destroyed by a laser, Recorder 451 is finally defeated by the Heavy Duty Armor.

After Tony Stark tells him that he is incapable of piloting the Godkiller, Recorder 451 orders the Godkiller to abort his mission, thus saving Earth. Recorder 451 realizes all his efforts and the beings he killed were in vain and decides to delete himself from existence. Tony hacks into Recorder 451's databases and obtains the access code, escaping the Godkiller just before it fades into another dimension.
