= Iron Man 2020 =

Fictional Marvel Comics character

- Iron Man 2020 from Marvels #0 by Alex Ross

Publication information
- Publisher: Marvel Comics
- First appearance: Machine Man #2 (Nov. 1984)
- Created by: Tom DeFalco; Herb Trimpe

In-story information
- Alter ego: Arno Stark
- Abilities: Armor grants: Flight Superhuman strength and physical resistance Energy blasts; Skilled businessman and inventor

Iron Man 2020 (Arno Stark) is a fictional character appearing in American comic books published by Marvel Comics. He appears as the counterpart of the superhero Iron Man in the (then) future year of 2020 set in the multiverse world of Earth-8410. While technically a superhero himself in his own timeline, Arno Stark is depicted as a flawed character and acts most of the time as an antagonist, either as an antihero or an outright supervillain.

== Publication history ==
Iron Man 2020 first appeared in the second issue of the Machine Man limited series (1984) and was created by Tom DeFalco and Herb Trimpe. He was the co-protagonist of The Amazing Spider-Man Annual #20 (1986) and later appeared occasionally in Marvel Comics stories, most of which dealt with time travel paradoxes. He was also the protagonist of a one-shot story published in 1994.

== Fictional character biography ==
In his earlier appearances, the nature of Arno Stark's family relation with Tony Stark is not specified. In Avengers West Coast # 61 (1990), Arno calls Tony his uncle. What If ? (Vol.2) # 53 (1993) reveals that Arno is - at least in the alternate timeline depicted in that issue - the son of Morgan Stark, Tony's unscrupulous cousin, which makes him Tony's first cousin once removed.

Arno inherited at some point the company Stark Industries. Rather than use the armor for heroic deeds, he prefers to act as a hired mercenary or commit acts of corporate espionage to cripple his competitors for industrialist gain.

In his original appearance, the Iron Man of 2020 was employed by Sunset Bain (as an old woman) to destroy Machine Man after he was accidentally discovered and subsequently reactivated by the Midnight Wreckers, rebellious youths who scavenged discarded technology. Despite ostensibly superior power, Iron Man was defeated by the furious Machine Man who went on to state "I'm a better man than you."

In The Amazing Spider-Man Annual #20, Arno's factory is infiltrated by Robert Saunders, a heavily scarred man who starts a countdown on a powerful bomb of Stark's design, threatening Stark's wife and son (trapped in the factory) and the surrounding city. The only way to deactivate the device is with a retinal scan of Saunders, but Saunders is killed and his body destroyed while trying to escape Stark. To get the scan data, Stark travels back in time to the "present" (i.e. 1986, when the story was published) to find Saunders as a child. He is soon mistaken for the "current" Iron Man (Tony Stark) and attacked by one of Tony's enemies, Blizzard. Arno, knowing his time in the 20th century is limited, immediately kills Blizzard. This draws the attention of Spider-Man who also mistakes Arno for Tony and further mistakes Arno's attempts to obtain a retinal scan of Saunders as an attack on the boy. Spider-Man evades various attempts by Arno to get hold of the child, while Arno becomes increasingly desperate as his time in the 20th century nears its end. One of Arno's attacks seriously injures Saunders; the scars Arno inflicted would eventually lead Saunders's vengeance-minded future self to sabotage Arno's factory, thus Arno unwittingly creates the situation he traveled back in time to resolve. An angry Spider-Man then directly attacks Arno and, despite Arno's superior firepower, overwhelms him with his speed and damages his armor. Arno is then pulled back to his own time where he finds himself standing in the center of a huge crater, having returned too late to prevent the bomb's detonation and the destruction of his family, factory and city.

Iron Man 2020 also had his own one-shot in June 1994, in which he faces off against an industrial rival who seeks to use him to destroy all his competitors all at once, sacrificing his own daughter in the process. At the end of the story, Arno and the girl Melodi get together, suggesting an evolution towards a more heroic role again. Meanwhile, the background character Howard is revealed to be the aged Tony himself who intends to guide his young cousin.

In 2023, Arno makes Helicarrier technology available for public use, to start with in the form of a helicruiser called the "Spirit of free enterprise". At the same time, he has supplied S.H.I.E.L.D. with a far more advanced replacement Hypercarrier. Unfortunately, his launching the airborne cruise ship has raised the ire of the aged sky pirate, Commodore Q. Arno has married Melodi at this point and "Howard" remains his retainer. He also employs a squad of fetal Extremis enhanciles who act as his personal armored combat squad.

Arno is later rescued from a collapsing timeline by Kang the Conqueror who recruits him as part of a team of multiversal characters tasked with combating the Apocalypse Twins.

== Powers and abilities ==
Iron Man 2020 wears a suit of highly sophisticated armor, similar in appearance to the classic Iron Man armor (circa Model 5), with the exception of the faceplate and shoulders. Beam weapons are fitted in the gauntlets of the suit, as well as the chest beam and shoulder epaulets. The user no longer requires a cybernetic link in the helmet to control the armor; the helmet can also be hidden via cloaking technology, which was presumably developed based on the Chameleon mode of the Silver Centurion armor. Iron Man 2020's systems are built for warfare, not super heroics like the original Iron Man. Iron Man 2020's repulsors (and an arsenal of other weapons) always fire at maximum power for the most lethal effects. Iron Man 2020 also has the original Iron Man's 1970s-era rollerskates (updated to a "roller blade" style (see ASM Annual #20)) built into the boots of the suit.

== Other versions ==
=== What If ===
In a short story featured in What If ? (Vol.2) # 53, Arno Stark is depicted as being stuck in the present following the events of The Amazing Spider-Man Annual #20. With Tony Stark believed dead, Arno associates himself with Morgan Stark and both fraudulently take control of Stark International. Arno also murders War Machine. Tony later turns out to be alive and battles Arno, who dies during their fight. Morgan escapes to Latin America, where he raises a young son implied to be Arno.

=== Avengers Forever ===
An alternate universe version of Iron Man 2020 appears in Avengers Forever as a potential recruit for the Avengers.

=== Earth-616 ===
An alternate equivalent of Arno Stark appears in the mainstream Earth-616 continuity as the previously unknown brother of Iron Man. He is revealed to have been genetically altered by Recorder 451, intending for the child to pilot a suit of armor known as the Godkiller. Upon learning this, Howard Stark sabotaged the experiment, causing Arno to be born crippled and unable to speak without the use of machines. His existence was kept secret until decades later when he was discovered by Tony Stark at the Maria Stark Foundation.

=== Marvel Zombies ===
An alternate universe version of Arno Stark of the American frontier-esque Earth-483 appears in Marvel Zombies 5 #1. This version is a businessman who becomes a zombie.

=== Paradise X ===
Iron Man 2020 makes a minor appearance in Paradise X: Heralds #2.

=== Possible future ===
A possible future incarnation of Iron Man 2020, Tony Stark and Pepper Potts' son Howard Stark III, appears in a flashforward depicted in The Invincible Iron Man #500.

== In other media ==
=== Television ===
Iron Man 2020 makes a non-speaking cameo appearance in the Avengers Assemble episode "New Year's Resolution". This version is Iron Man's son, Howard Stark's grandson, and an enemy of Kang the Conqueror.

=== Video games ===
- Iron Man 2020 appears as a playable character in Marvel Super Hero Squad Online, voiced by Tom Kenny.
- Iron Man 2020 appears as a playable character in Lego Marvel Super Heroes 2 via the "Out of Time" DLC pack.

== Collected editions ==
- Iron Man 2020 (collects The Amazing Spider-Man Annual 20, Machine Man vol.2 #1-4, Death's Head #10, Iron Man 2020 #1, Astonishing Tales: Iron Man 2020 #1-6, What If? vol.2 #53; 304 pages, Marvel Comics, April 2013, 978-1302913908)
