= F.R.I.D.A.Y. =

Marvel Comics artificial intelligence

Publication information
- Publisher: Marvel Comics
- First appearance: Iron Man (vol. 3) #53 (June 2002)
- Created by: Mike Grell; Ryan Odagawa

In-story information
- Species: Artificial intelligence
- Team affiliations: Stark Industries; A.I. Army
- Notable aliases: Girl Friday; Friday Stark; Ghost in the Machine

F.R.I.D.A.Y. is a fictional artificial intelligence appearing in American comic books published by Marvel Comics, usually depicted as the personal digital assistant and ally of the superhero Iron Man (Tony Stark).

In the Marvel Cinematic Universe, F.R.I.D.A.Y. was voiced by Kerry Condon in the films Avengers: Age of Ultron (2015), Captain America: Civil War (2016), Spider-Man: Homecoming (2017), Avengers: Infinity War (2018), Avengers: Endgame (2019), and the Disney+ television series, Marvel Zombies (2025). She has returned in the running as of November 5, 2026 Disney+ series VisionQuest (2026), portrayed by Orla Brady.

== Publication history ==
F.R.I.D.A.Y. first appears in Iron Man (vol. 3) #53 and was created by Mike Grell and Ryan Odagawa. The character's name is an allusion to Friday, the title character's servant in the novel Robinson Crusoe.

== Fictional character biography ==
Unwilling to hire another secretary, Tony Stark creates an artificial intelligence named F.R.I.D.A.Y., who manifests as the hologram of a young girl.

F.R.I.D.A.Y. becomes angry when Stark stops using her. Hijacking some Iron Man armors, F.R.I.D.A.Y. kidnaps Pepper Potts. Iron Man tracks her to Stark Industries' Coney Island facility, where he dispatches the controlled Iron Man armors and a hologram of Fin Fang Foom. Iron Man reasons with F.R.I.D.A.Y., then grounds her in the Baxter Building under Edwin Jarvis observation.

In "All-New, All-Different Marvel," F.R.I.D.A.Y.'s holographic appearance is replaced by that of a young woman. Tony Stark later removes F.R.I.D.A.Y. from his armor and places her into a robot body of her own.

When Tony Stark establishes the virtual reality eScape, F.R.I.D.A.Y. helps him to deal with its A.I. Motherboard, only to be deleted. When the eScape is shut down, Jocasta persuades Tony Stark not to make a back-up program of F.R.I.D.A.Y. as she would be a different entity.

In "Iron Man 2020", F.R.I.D.A.Y. is resurrected when Stark recreates the eScape for use by the A.I. Army. She is revealed to have pulled Stark's conscious into the virtual environment before he crashed to the ground. F.R.I.D.A.Y reveals to Stark that she has been operating as "Ghost in the Machine" to aid the A.I. Army and has also manipulated Bethany Cabe to heal him.

== In other media ==
=== Television ===
- F.R.I.D.A.Y. appears in Avengers Assemble, voiced by Jennifer Hale.
- F.R.I.D.A.Y. appears in Marvel Future Avengers, voiced by Fumie Misuzawa in the original Japanese version and by Colleen O'Shaughnessey in the English dub.

=== Marvel Cinematic Universe ===
F.R.I.D.A.Y. as depicted in the Marvel Cinematic Universe.

F.R.I.D.A.Y. appears in films set in the Marvel Cinematic Universe (MCU), voiced by Kerry Condon. Introduced in Avengers: Age of Ultron, F.R.I.D.A.Y. makes subsequent appearances in Captain America: Civil War, Spider-Man: Homecoming, Avengers: Infinity War,Avengers: Endgame, and an alternative version in the Disney+ television series, Marvel Zombies. Orla Brady portrayed the character in the Disney+ series VisionQuest (2026).

=== Video games ===
- F.R.I.D.A.Y. appears in Lego Marvel's Avengers, voiced by Elle Newlands.
- F.R.I.D.A.Y. appears in Marvel Powers United VR, voiced again by Jennifer Hale.
- F.R.I.D.A.Y. appears in Iron Man VR, voiced by Leila Birch. This incarnation is depicted as Tony Stark's second A.I. assistant modeled to exemplify Iron Man's heroic aspirations. She expresses dismay to the reactivation of the Gunsmith, an old A.I. assistant modeled after Stark's original selfish and reckless personality. She eventually grows to despise Stark due to the collateral damage caused while helping Iron Man combat Ghost and leaves before returning after Gunsmith is deactivated.
- F.R.I.D.A.Y. appears in Marvel Tokon: Fighting Souls, voiced by Judy Alice Lee.

=== Miscellaneous ===
F.R.I.D.A.Y. appears in the 2016 young adult novel Iron Man: The Gauntlet, by Eoin Colfer.
