= Arno Stark =

Comic book character

Arno Stark is the name of two characters appearing in American comic books published by Marvel Comics, both being relatives of Tony Stark, A.K.A. the superhero Iron Man. The first of these characters is best known as Iron Man 2020 and appears as a counterpart of Iron Man from the multiverse. The second appears in the mainstream Marvel Comics timeline and is himself associated with the Iron Man 2020 event.

== Publication history ==
Iron Man 2020 first appeared in Machine Man #2 (1984 miniseries), and was created by Tom DeFalco and Herb Trimpe.

The Earth-616 Arno Stark appeared unnamed in Iron Man #12 (September 2013) and named in Iron Man #17 (December 2013), and was created by Kieron Gillen and Dale Eaglesham.

== Fictional characters biographies ==
=== Iron Man 2020 ===
The first version of Arno Stark comes from the alternate universe of Earth-8410, set in the (then) future year of 2020. Though his family relation with Tony Stark is initially unspecified, he is later shown to be Tony's first cousin once removed.

Arno Stark first appeared in Machine Man (1984 limited series) #2, then in The Amazing Spider-Man Annual #20 (1986) and later in other stories dealing with time travel or paradoxes. He was the protagonist of a one-shot story published in 1994. He is generally depicted as an amoral, unscrupulous character or at least a flawed, unworthy successor to Tony Stark.

==== Powers and abilities ====
The Earth-8410 version of Arno Stark is a genius-level inventor, though as a superhero he is shown as lacking in tactical skills and moral compass.

=== Earth-616 version ===
Arno Stark

Publication information
- Publisher: Marvel Comics
- First appearance: Iron Man #12 (September 2013; unnamed Iron Man #17 (December 2013; named)
- Created by: Kieron Gillen; Dale Eaglesham

In-story information
- Alter ego: Arno Stark
- Species: Human
- Team affiliations: Iron Legion
- Notable aliases: Iron Man
- Abilities: Armor grants: Flight; Superhuman strength and physical resistance Energy blasts

An alternate equivalent of Arno Stark appears in the mainstream Earth-616 continuity as the previously unknown brother of Iron Man. He is revealed to have been genetically altered by Recorder 451, intending for the child to pilot a suit of armor known as the Godkiller. Upon learning this, Howard Stark sabotaged the experiment, causing Arno to be born crippled and unable to speak without the use of machines. His existence was kept secret until decades later when he was discovered by Tony Stark at the Maria Stark Foundation.

Arno later worked on a remake of the Extremis virus. This Extremis was used to cure Bruce Banner of his head injury. His technology advancements also allowed Arno to rewrite his own DNA and cure his body.

Arno later acquires Stark Unlimited through a merger with Baintronics. With the combined resources, he builds the Iron Man Armor Model 66 as his attempt to recreate the Godbuster Armor and becomes Iron Man.

During the "Iron Man 2020" storyline, Arno becomes convinced the Earth is being threatened by an alien called the Extinction Entity, in reality a delusion caused by his dormant disease, which will return and kill him in less than a year. Realizing he cannot cure Arno of his delusion, Tony traps him in a virtual reality where he defeats the Extinction Entity and becomes a beloved hero.

==== Powers and abilities ====
The Earth-616 version of Arno Stark has genius-level intellect and an enhanced biology. As Iron Man, he wielded the Iron Man Armor Model 66.

== Other versions ==
An alternate universe version of Arno Stark from the Battleworld domain of Technopolis appears in the Secret Wars tie-in "Armor Wars".

== In other media ==
The Earth-616 version of Arno Stark appears as a playable character in Marvel: Future Fight. Additionally, alternate costume designs based on Iron Man's Hulkbuster armor from Avengers: Age of Ultron and Bruce Banner's from Avengers: Infinity War appear as well.
