= Baron Brimstone =

Marvel Comics supervillain

- Baron Brimstone as depicted in Heroes for Hire (vol. 3) #2 (January 2011). Art by Brad Walker (penciler), Andrew Hennessy (inker), and Jay Ramos (colorist).

Publication information
- Publisher: Marvel Comics
- First appearance: Machine Man #16 (August 1980)
- Created by: Tom DeFalco (script); Steve Ditko (art)

In-story information
- Alter ego: Baron Walther Theodoric
- Species: Human
- Team affiliations: Satan Squad
- Abilities: Magic user; Wields a high-tech harness that enables him to teleport and manipulate energy

Baron Brimstone (Walther Theodoric) is a fictional character appearing in American comic books published by Marvel Comics.

== Publication history ==
Baron Brimstone first appeared in Machine Man #16 (August 1980), and was created by writer Tom DeFalco and artist Steve Ditko.

The character subsequently appears in Marvel Team-Up #99 (Nov. 1980), The Avengers #251 (Jan. 1985), and Fantastic Four #336 (Jan. 1990).

== Fictional character biography ==
Baron Brimstone is a criminal who appears to use a combination of magical powers and technological devices in committing thefts. In his first appearance, Baron Brimstone steals the Sol-Mac from the Chem-Solar Corporation to mass-produce it as a weapon and sell it to other criminals. The security at Chem-Solar and Machine Man are unable to prevent the theft. Baron Brimstone later organizes a meeting with non-Maggia affiliated criminals to recruit them into his Satan Squad. Duke Dawson, one of the assembled criminals, takes exception to Brimstone's leadership and met with Delmar Insurance agent Pamela Quinn. This results in Baron Brimstone sending his lieutenants "Snake" Marston and "Hammer" Harrison to bring her in for interrogation. When Machine Man tracks them and finds the Satan Squad's hideout, he rescues Quinn, and hands Baron Brimstone to the police.

While imprisoned on Ryker's Island, Brimstone escapes by hypnotizing a guard into freeing him and frees Sandman. He plots revenge on Machine Man before being defeated by him and Spider-Man.

Brimstone later robs a casino on the French Riviera. The Caribbean-based casino owners hire Paladin to bring him to justice. The Wasp assists in the Baron's defeat.

In Acts of Vengeance, Doctor Doom forces Brimstone, Armadillo, Man-Ape, Orka, Stilt-Man, and Whirlwind to attack the Fantastic Four at their court hearing. All the villains are defeated and taken into police custody.

Several years later, Brimstone is involved in the Demonica Soulcutters, an arms racket in Miami, before being defeated by the Heroes for Hire and sent to Hell where he had to deal with his unidentified employer.
