= Coldblood =

Marvel Comics fictional character

- Coldblood (left) and Havok (right), art by Paul Gulacy.

Publication information
- Publisher: Marvel Comics
- First appearance: Marvel Comics Presents #26 (Aug. 1989)
- Created by: Doug Moench; Paul Gulacy

In-story information
- Alter ego: Eric Savin
- Team affiliations: S.H.I.E.L.D. Roxxon Oil
- Notable aliases: Coldblood-7
- Abilities: Cyborg with artificial body parts Excellent hand to hand combatant Superb marksman

Coldblood-7 (Eric Savin) is a fictional character appearing in American comic books published by Marvel Comics. The character first appeared in Marvel Comics Presents #26 (Aug. 1989).

The character was portrayed by James Badge Dale in the Marvel Cinematic Universe film Iron Man 3 (2013).

== Fictional character biography ==
Eric Savin was a lieutenant colonel in the United States Army serving at Camp Killian. He had an investigation but ended up transferred before touching a freshly planted mine, which gravely injured him. Savin undergoes cybernetic surgery and is resurrected as the cyborg super-soldier Coldblood-7. Sustaining amnesia, Coldblood meets Gina Dyson, his surgeon, who he falls in love with. Coldblood battles the various robots of the project designer Mako, which he destroys before running away with Gina.

In later missions, Coldblood is hired by the Roxxon Oil Company and instructed to retrieve a stolen biochemical weapon from Jonathan Cayre's lab. Coldblood gains the help of the original Excalibur team and succeeded in his mission.

As an urban soldier cyborg, Coldblood operates as a freelance mercenary. He evaded capture by Mechadoom. Coldblood hunts down and battles fellow cyborg Deathlok (Michael Collins) in Paris. He then joins forces with Deathlok and Siege in defeating Harlan Ryker's cyber-warriors. Again later, he works together with Deathlok, Silver Sable, and the Wild Pack against the villain group ULTIMATUM.

Coldblood was seen together with Monica Rambeau, Wonder Man, Darkhawk, Dracula, Terror, Sleepwalker and Deathlok, who are all held hostage by the Beyonder.

In the 2006-2007 Civil War storyline, Coldblood is arrested after opposing the Superhuman Registration Act. He is seen being transported to Negative Zone Prison Alpha and suffers a psychotic break. After being freed from prison, Coldblood is seen among the anti-Registration heroes gathered by Captain America.

== Powers and abilities ==
Eric Savin was converted into the cyborg Coldblood by Dr. Gina Dyson following designs by Mako. This gave him superhuman strength, reflexes, speed, stamina, durability, and enhanced sensory systems. These include night vision, as he can see into the infrared. Coldblood can also interface with virtually any computer system, and, by mentally entering "cyberspace", to communicate with such systems. He has a wetware-grafted computer grafted to his organic brain, a plasti-steel-reinforced skeleton, an artificial heart, synthetic hemoglobin, and artificial right eye. His legs are clearly cybernetic, while his arms are composed of synthetic skin and muscle over a plasti-steel skeleton. The right half of his face is an armored cybernetic implant.

The exact limits of his strength are not known, but he is able to engage effectively in combat with Deathlok; an arguably much more advanced cyborg. His artificial muscles do eventually fatigue, but he can perform at full exertion for many hours without tiring. The organic portions of Coldblood's body still require food, drink, oxygen and sleep; however his artificial blood and organs grant him considerable resistance to diseases and radiation.

His in-built computer analyses his sensory input; tracks targets and is capable of seeing through illusions, detecting holograms and so forth. It requires a recharge of electricity every twelve months of active service. The portion of Coldblood's organic brain that accessed his personal memories was removed during his conversion into a cyborg.

Coldblood wears body armor and uses conventional firearms, including a .357 automatic gun implanted in his left hand. Project: Ultra-Tech also specially designed a high-speed automobile for him, with built-in guns. It can be either remote controlled by a device in Coldblood's left wrist, or automatically by his in-built computer. Coldblood is a skilled hand-to-hand combatant, highly trained in commando fighting and the use of conventional firearms.

== In other media ==
- Eric Savin appears in Iron Man 3, portrayed by James Badge Dale. This version is a former lieutenant colonel and Aldrich Killian's right-hand man who underwent the Extremis treatment to enhance his combat skills with various fire-based powers and a regenerative healing factor, and poses as the Iron Patriot.
- Eric Savin / Iron Patriot appears in Marvel Super Hero Squad Online, voiced by Steve Blum.
