= Pepper Potts =

Marvel Comics fictional character

- Pepper Potts / Rescue. Cover of The Invincible Iron Man Vol. 2 #29 (August 2010). Art by Stuart Immonen.

Publication information
- Publisher: Marvel Comics
- First appearance: As Pepper Potts: Tales of Suspense #45 (September 1963); As Rescue: The Invincible Iron Man #10 (May 2009)
- Created by: Pepper Potts: Stan Lee (writer); Robert Bernstein (writer); Don Heck (artist); Rescue: Matt Fraction (writer); Salvador Larroca (artist)

In-story information
- Full name: Virginia "Pepper" Potts
- Species: Human cyborg
- Team affiliations: Stark Industries; The Initiative; The Order; Avengers
- Supporting character of: Iron Man
- Notable aliases: Coast Guard; Iron Woman; Iron Man; Rescue; Hera
- Abilities: Stark-tech mag-field generator implanted in her chest granting: Enhanced strength, durability, and senses; Electromagnetic field sensing; Regenerative healing factor; Levitation; Armor granting: Superhuman strength and durability; Energy projection; Flight

Virginia "Pepper" Potts is a character appearing in American comic books published by Marvel Comics. Created by writers Stan Lee and Robert Bernstein, and designed by artist Don Heck, the character first appeared in Tales of Suspense #45 (September 1963). Pepper Potts is a supporting character and love interest of the superhero Tony Stark / Iron Man. The character has also been known as Hera and Rescue at various points in her history.

Since her original introduction in comics, the character has been featured in various other Marvel-licensed products, including video games, animated television series, and merchandise. Gwyneth Paltrow portrays Pepper Potts in the Marvel Cinematic Universe (MCU) films Iron Man (2008), Iron Man 2 (2010), The Avengers (2012), Iron Man 3 (2013), Spider-Man: Homecoming (2017), Avengers: Infinity War (2018), and Avengers: Endgame (2019). Beth Hoyt voices an alternate version of the character in the animated Disney+ series What If...? (2021).

== Development ==
=== Concept and creation ===
Don Heck modeled Pepper Potts as Ann B. Davis' character of Schultzy from The Bob Cummings Show. She is rendered with brown hair done up in a hairdo similar to Schultzy's. Someone on the creative team or in editorial came to feel that the resemblance was too great, and in Tales of Suspense #50, Potts' look was altered to give her red hair and a different hairdo. Though she was named Pepper Potts from the start, Tony Stark addresses her as "Kitty" in one panel, which is thought to be a typo.

=== Publication history ===
Virginia "Pepper" Potts debuted in Tales of Suspense #45 (September 1963), created by writer Stan Lee, writer Robert Bernstein, and artist Don Heck. She appeared in the 2020 Rescue comic book series.

== Fictional character biography ==
=== Early history ===
Potts is originally a member of a secretarial pool, and gets her job by fixing an accounting error made by Stark. She is depicted initially as being infatuated with Stark, and rejects the advances of Stark's chauffeur and assistant Happy Hogan, who debuted in the same issue, with acerbic remarks. As Stark's affection for her grows in the ensuing issues, she becomes part of a love triangle between the two men, and eventually falls in love with and marries Hogan, eloping with him in Tales of Suspense #91.

Pepper and Happy Hogan

Pepper and Happy eventually leave Stark Industries, settling in the Rocky Mountains and then finally in Cleveland, where they adopt children after being unable to conceive, and disappear from the main Iron Man storyline. After being kidnapped by Stark's rival Obadiah Stane, Pepper tells Tony to stay out of their lives. Pepper and Happy soon divorce after she has an affair with a former college boyfriend. After Tony Stark's return from the Heroes Reborn universe, Pepper and Happy join Tony at his new company, Stark Solutions, and once again become core characters. After some time, Happy and Pepper once again became involved and remarry, eventually considering conceiving a child to supplement their adopted children. Stark entrusts Pepper with a special remote that could shut him down. However, Pepper, tortured by the responsibility, is forced to return it, and the trauma causes her to miscarry. Stark is able to deal with the remote, but feels guilty that he has placed her in such danger.

After Happy sustains massive injuries in a fight with Spymaster during the 2006–2007 "Civil War" storyline, Pepper requests that Tony turn off Happy's life support.

=== The Order ===
After the events of the "Civil War" story line, Pepper joins the Fifty State Initiative as a member of The Order, a government sanctioned superhero team operating within California. She assumes the moniker of the Greek goddess Hera, and uses advanced computer-hardware and prosthetics to monitor and coordinate the team's missions. Upon the absorption of The Order into the Initiative, Tony Stark offers her a job on the special-projects team at Stark Enterprises, which she accepts.

=== 2008 – present ===
Pepper Potts resumes her activities as personal secretary of Tony Stark. When Pepper is caught in a terrorist explosion caused by Ezekiel "Zeke" Stane, she sustains multiple internal injuries, including shrapnel wounds, and rendered unable to withstand a prolonged surgery. In response, Tony embeds a strong magnet in her chest, essentially turning Pepper into a cyborg dependent on keeping her chest magnet engaged to stay alive, as he was once.

When Tony is blamed for the Skrull invasion of Earth that occurs in the 2008 storyline "Secret Invasion", S.H.I.E.L.D. is taken over by Norman Osborn, replaced with H.A.M.M.E.R., and Stark and Maria Hill are fired, along with all of S.H.I.E.L.D.'s employees. Tony realizes that Osborn is after the identities of superhumans that registered with the government following the passage of the Superhuman Registration Act that occurred during the "Civil War" storyline, which is stored in a database in his brain. Stark decides to go underground with Hill, and to wipe the knowledge in his own brain. Stark makes Pepper the new CEO of Stark Industries, trusting only her to shut down the company in his absence. Pepper discovers a secret room in Stark's office which contains a suit of armor that he made especially for her, which she uses under the name Rescue. Though Osborn has seized all Stark Industries facilities and equipment, Pepper states that all components of her armor are legal and that the design specifications are available to anyone. Despite Osborn threatening her loved ones with prison if she interferes with his search for Tony or attempts any more heroic actions, after being freed she endeavors to find Tony herself. They are reunited in Russia, and consummate a now-sexual relationship, but are subsequently captured and tortured by Madame Masque, who was assigned by Norman Osborn to track Stark down. Stark admits that he had loved Masque in the past, but when pressed to make a choice, with his own life on the line, Tony chooses Pepper. Pepper decides to engage Masque in a physical altercation to provide a distraction for Stark to escape.

During the 2009 "World's Most Wanted Storyline" (which ran concurrently with Marvel's company-wide storyline "Dark Reign"), Pepper, after defeating Masque, disguises herself as Masque, infiltrating H.A.M.M.E.R. while presenting the Rescue armor to Osborn as spoils of battle. Pepper reveals herself when she rescues Black Widow and Maria Hill from Osborn's imprisonment, while the Rescue suit uploads a virus into H.A.M.M.E.R.'s computers, taking control of the Helicarrier's armory of suits. They then retrieve the hard drive that Hill was assigned by Stark to get, escaping to give it to Captain America in order to restore Stark's mind. As part of "re-booting" Tony (in a vegetative state), the magnet in her chest is removed and placed into his.

Though Stark's memories are restored from a somewhat years-old backup, he no longer remembers the events of the "Civil War" nor his role in it, its aftermath or his affair with Pepper. Pepper survives the removal of her chest magnet, but demands that a new one similar to Tony's own chest repulsor be re-installed, which is done. Recovered, Stark also gifts Pepper with a new Rescue armor, complete with JARVIS.

During the 2011 "Stark Resilient" storyline, when Justine Hammer and Sasha Hammer use their own armored enforcer Detroit Steel to attempt to sabotage Stark Resilient (Tony's new company) and its design for a repulsor technology-powered vehicle, Pepper joins War Machine in helping Stark, during which Pepper experiences a near-death experience in which J.A.R.V.I.S., masquerading as Happy, gives Pepper a cryptic warning of the future.

In the 2012 storyline "The Future", Pepper returns to her civilian life following her destruction of J.A.R.V.I.S., the artificial intelligence that helped her control her Rescue armor, after its compromise led it to go rogue and attempt to kidnap her. She became engaged to Marc Kumar, a public relations and marketing consultant, but broke off the relationship after he briefly became a supervillain.

After Tony undergoes a moral inversion following a confrontation with the psychic Red Skull, Pepper attempts to oppose his efforts to release Extremis on a large scale with the aid of an A.I. back-up of Tony's mind he created eight years ago in the event of his mind being attacked in such a manner. Although the A.I. concludes that Tony's mind is irreversibly twisted, and is subsequently destroyed by Tony, Pepper states that she bought one of the largest media companies from under him which she will use to destroy his reputation by broadcasting his plans to the rest of the world. She then proclaims that any attempts he makes to create his 'perfect world' will have to be carried out with people fully aware that he is now nothing but a monster.

Following the "Civil War II" storyline, Pepper Potts confronted Riri Williams and her Tony Stark A.I. in an attempt to tell Riri the problems of being a superhero only for them to be attacked by Techno Golem and her Biohack Ninjas. As Riri flees, Pepper fights against Techno Golem and her Biohack Ninjas as Techno Golem tries to get answers from Pepper on how she knows Riri. After the Biohack Ninjas are defeated, Pepper states to Riri that they will talk again as she flies off in her Rescue armor. When Amanda Armstrong offers to have Riri let Tony Stark's labs be her base of operations, Riri is hesitant as Pepper encourages her.

In the series "Iron Man 2020", Tony Stark came to accept that he is an artificial construct of the real Tony and Pepper Potts is among the people who Tony did not return the calls to. Pepper Potts and Bethany Cabe came up with a way to rebuild Stark that involves the DNA samples of his parents. Pepper is introduced to an off the grid navigation artificial intelligence incorporated into the Rescue armor called H.A.P.P.Y. (Host Analogue Program Pre-Y2K), whose personality is modeled after Happy Hogan.

== Powers and abilities ==
=== Stark-tech mag-field generator ===
The Stark-tech mag-field generator implanted in Pepper's chest was not weapons-based like Stark's, but borrowed non-weaponized electromagnetic technology from Rand Industries, which caused a number of physical changes to her body. It cured her tinnitus, improving her hearing and her other senses. It allows her to sense electromagnetic fields, and manipulate them to levitate her body. It enhances her strength and durability, and allows her to recover more quickly from injuries.

=== Armor ===
Potts' Stark-tech armor suit, which is designated Mark 1616, but named Rescue by Potts, represents a hybrid of repulsor technology and portable electromagnetic super-field generators that give the suit flight, speed, strength, and magnetic-field manipulation. Its electromagnetic force fields are powerful enough to enable Rescue to stop a falling jet airliner without physical contact with it, and can also be used as an offensive weapon with other armored opponents. The suit's physical strength enables it to hold up a stilt mansion felled by an earthquake, and to rip the lower leg of the Black armor. The armor also features an artificial intelligence named J.A.R.V.I.S. that acts as a guide for Potts. During the 2012 storyline "The Future", when Potts is using the second version of the Rescue armor, she and Carson Wyche come to suspect that the Mandarin has hacked J.A.R.V.I.S. to spy on her, and when they attempt to troubleshoot the Rescue helmet, J.A.R.V.I.S. takes control of the armor, and takes Potts and Wyche hostage. J.A.R.V.I.S. is disabled by James Rhodes with an electromagnetic pulse from the Black armor. Potts eventually destroys J.A.R.V.I.S. by placing the Rescue helmet inside an MRI scanner, seeming to end her career as Rescue.

Subsequent comics depict Potts wearing new Rescue suits without clearly showing when she started using them. In the series Superior Iron Man, Potts uses a purple and white Rescue armor armed with sonic disruptors. After the Marvel universe was rebooted in the Secret Wars event, this version of the armor did not appear again. The red Rescue armor that Potts wears when she meets Riri Williams in The Invincible Iron Man (vol. 4) #3 (2017) is based on the Marvel Legends Rescue action figure released in 2015. The Iron Man 2020 event and its Rescue 2020 spin-off depict Potts using a blue Rescue armor based on the one from the film Avengers: Endgame.

== Reception ==
=== Critical response ===
Deirdre Kaye of Scary Mommy called Pepper Potts a "role model" and a "truly heroic" female character. Comic Book Resources ranked Pepper Potts 1st in their "10 Love Interests Of Iron Man" list, and 4th in their "15 Iron Man Armors Ranked Worst To Best (And 5 Who Wore The Armor Better)" list. The A.V. Club ranked Pepper Potts 85th in their "100 Best Marvel Characters" list.

== Other versions ==
=== Amalgam Comics ===
Pepper Ferris / Madame Sapphire, a fusion of Pepper Potts, Madame Masque, and DC Comics character Star Sapphire from Earth-9602, appears in the Amalgam Comics one-shot Iron Lantern.

=== Heroes Reborn ===
An alternate universe version of Pepper Potts from a pocket dimension created by Franklin Richards appears in Heroes Reborn.

=== Marvel Zombies ===
A zombified alternative universe version of Pepper Potts from Earth-91126 appears in Marvel Zombies Return #2.

=== Ultimate Marvel ===
An alternate universe version of Pepper Potts from Earth-1610 appears in the Ultimate Marvel universe.

=== The Invincible Iron Man ===
The Invincible Iron Man #500 shows a flashforward 40 years ahead. Her (and Tony's) son Howard Anthony Stark and granddaughter Virginia "Ginny" Stark are in an apocalyptic future where the Mandarin has conquered the world. An aged version of Tony Stark defeats the long-time foe with the help of Howard and Ginny Stark, but Howard and Tony Stark sacrifice themselves in the process. At the story's close, Ginny buries the two next to Pepper Potts' gravestone.

== In other media ==
=== Television ===
Pepper Potts as she appears in Iron Man: Armored Adventures.

- Pepper Potts appears in the "Iron Man" segments of The Marvel Super Heroes, voiced by Margaret Griffin.
- Pepper Potts does not appear in Iron Man as her role as Stark's assistant was instead taken by Julia Carpenter.
- Pepper Potts appears in Iron Man: Armored Adventures, voiced by Anna Cummer. This version is a teenager whose full name is Patricia "Pepper" Potts and is initially unaware of Iron Man's secret identity until she learns it after he saves her life. Later in the series, she eventually learns to use Iron Man's stealth armor, is given her own armor, and becomes Rescue.
- Pepper Potts appears in Mad, variously voiced by Tara Strong, Rachel Ramras, and Meredith Salenger.
- Pepper Potts appears in The Avengers: Earth's Mightiest Heroes, voiced by Dawn Olivieri.
- Pepper Potts appears in Marvel Anime: Iron Man, voiced by Hiroe Oka in the Japanese dub and by Cindy Robinson in the English dub.
- Pepper Potts appears in Lego Marvel Super Heroes: Maximum Overload, voiced by Grey DeLisle.
- Pepper Potts appears in Marvel Disk Wars: The Avengers, voiced by Fumie Mizusawa in the Japanese dub and Ali Hillis in the English dub.
- Pepper Potts appears in Lego Marvel Avengers: Time Twisted, voiced by Elyse Maloway.
- Pepper Potts appears in a promotional short for Iron Man and his Awesome Friends, voiced by an uncredited actress.

=== Film ===
- Pepper Potts appears in The Invincible Iron Man, voiced by Elisa Gabrielli.
- Pepper Potts appears in Iron Man: Rise of Technovore, voiced by Hiroe Oka in the Japanese version and Kate Higgins in the English dub.

=== Marvel Cinematic Universe ===
Gwyneth Paltrow as Pepper Potts in the 2008 film Iron Man

- Pepper Potts appears in media set in the Marvel Cinematic Universe, portrayed by Gwyneth Paltrow.
  - Introduced in the live-action film Iron Man (2008), this version is Tony Stark's personal assistant and friend who later becomes one of the first people to learn of his work as Iron Man and helps him defeat Obadiah Stane.
  - In Iron Man 2, Pepper Potts is named the new CEO of Stark Industries and meets her replacement "Natalie Rushman", who she initially distrusts. She also joins Happy Hogan in rescuing Stark from Ivan Vanko and has Justin Hammer arrested for attacking the Stark Expo.
  - Potts makes a minor appearance in The Avengers, in which she contributes to the construction of Stark Tower before they convert it into Avengers Tower.
  - In Iron Man 3, Potts is kidnapped by Aldrich Killian, who takes her hostage and injects her with the Extremis as part of his scheme to get revenge on Stark. She later uses her Extremis powers to kill Killian before Stark funds a surgery to cure her of Extremis.
  - Potts makes a cameo appearance in Spider-Man: Homecoming, in which she and Stark get engaged.
  - Potts makes a minor appearance in Avengers: Infinity War, in which she and Stark discuss having children before he is taken by Stephen Strange and Bruce Banner to save the universe from Thanos.
  - In Avengers: Endgame, Potts is reunited with Stark. Over the course of the following five years, they go on to get married, have a daughter named Morgan, and live at a lakeside cabin until Stark is recruited by the Avengers to undo the Blip. Potts, in her Rescue suit, later joins the Avengers in fighting an alternate timeline variant of Thanos and his army before Stark sacrifices himself to defeat them. Potts, Morgan, the Avengers, and their allies subsequently hold a funeral for him.
  - Alternate timeline incarnations of Pepper Potts appear in the animated Disney+ series What If...?, voiced by Beth Hoyt. In the episode "What If... Killmonger Rescued Tony Stark?," Potts suspects Stark Industries' new COO, Erik "Killmonger" Stevens, of killing James Rhodes and Stark before she is approached by Princess Shuri of Wakanda, who offers an alliance to expose Killmonger. In the episode "What If... the Watcher Broke His Oath?", Potts, Shuri, and the Dora Milaje storm Killmonger's throne room, only to find him gone as the Watcher recruited him to save the multiverse.

=== Video games ===
- Pepper Potts appears in the Iron Man film tie-in game, voiced by Meredith Monroe.
- Pepper Potts appears in the Iron Man 2 film tie-in game, voiced again by Meredith Monroe.
- Pepper Potts appears in Marvel Pinball, voiced by Tara Platt.
- Pepper Potts / Rescue makes a cameo appearance in Strider Hiryu's ending in Ultimate Marvel vs. Capcom 3.
- Pepper Potts / Rescue appears as a playable character in Marvel Super Hero Squad Online, voiced by Laura Bailey.
- Pepper Potts / Rescue appears as a playable character in Marvel Avengers Alliance.
- Pepper Potts appears in Marvel's The Avengers Iron Man Mark VII, voiced by Careth Eaton.
- Pepper Potts appears as a non-playable character in Marvel Heroes, voiced by Brett Walter.
- Pepper Potts / Rescue appears as a playable character in Lego Marvel Super Heroes, voiced again by Laura Bailey.
- Pepper Potts / Rescue appears in Lego Marvel's Avengers, voiced by Eliza Schneider.
- Pepper Potts appears in Marvel Avengers Academy. This version is initially depicted as Nick Fury's assistant. On March 20, 2016, Potts as Rescue was made obtainable for a limited time.
- Pepper Potts / Rescue appears as a playable character in Marvel Puzzle Quest.
- Pepper Potts / Rescue appears as a playable character in Marvel Strike Force.
- Rescue appears as a playable character in Marvel: Future Fight.
- Pepper Potts / Rescue appears in Iron Man VR, voiced by Jennifer Hale. This version is Tony Stark's former assistant who was recently promoted to CEO of Stark Industries.
- Pepper Potts / Rescue appears in Marvel Snap.

=== Miscellaneous ===
- Pepper Potts appears in Marvel Universe Live!.
- In 2019, Hot Toys released a Pepper Potts / Rescue action figure inspired by the Marvel Cinematic Universe (MCU) incarnation of the character.
