= Howard Stark =

American comic book character by Marvel

- Howard Stark as seen in S.H.I.E.L.D. (vol. 2) #1. Art by Dustin Weaver.

Publication information
- Publisher: Marvel Comics
- First appearance: Iron Man #28 (August 1970)
- Created by: Archie Goodwin (writer); Don Heck (artist)

In-story information
- Full name: Howard Anthony Walter Stark
- Species: Human
- Place of origin: Earth
- Team affiliations: Stark Industries; S.H.I.E.L.D; Control
- Supporting character of: Iron Man; Captain America
- Abilities: Genius-level intellect; Highly proficient scientist, engineer, and businessperson

Howard Stark is a character appearing in American comic books published by Marvel Comics. The character primarily appears in a supporting role in stories featuring Iron Man and stories featuring Captain America. He is the founder of Stark Industries and the father of Tony Stark (Iron Man).

Howard Stark has also appeared in several animated television series and films. Actors John Slattery and Dominic Cooper have portrayed the character throughout the Marvel Cinematic Universe (MCU) franchise.

== Publication history ==
Howard Stark was created by Archie Goodwin and designed by artist Don Heck. He made his first appearance in Iron Man #28 (August 1, 1970). He was loosely based on Howard Hughes, a film producer and aviator.

Described as a sarcastic scientist and ruthless businessman, Howard worked alongside his father on various projects, and later founded Stark Industries. He was an inventive mechanical engineering prodigy, constantly creating new technology and looking for ways to improve such technology. He designed and built weaponry and devices that have revolutionized the industrial world, such as various technologies used by S.H.I.E.L.D. and its allies. Howard later married to Maria Stark, and they had their child, Tony Stark. Howard's relationship with Tony was a difficult one. Howard's major weakness was his severe case of alcoholism, a problem Tony himself would inherit. In the comics, Howard and his wife died in a car crash, as the result of faulty brakes arranged by either business competitors Republic Oil & Gas or by V-Battalion. Howard's death inspired his son to take both business and engineering seriously as Iron Man.

== Fictional character biography ==
=== Original depiction ===
Howard Stark's first appearance in Iron Man #28 (August 1970)

Being the son of Howard Stark Sr., he was born in Richford, New York. An avid and brilliant inventor from a young age, Howard was a brilliant scientist throughout his life, becoming a power systems engineer. Stark and his father worked on various business projects with his skills in engineering, and later founded Stark Industries. In 1937, Howard Stark met with Dominic Fortune and Amanda MacLain, who told him about how Amanda's sister Andrea was using her connections in the mineral trade to secure rare metals vital to Stark Industries' development and also found out that the company was supplying arnaments to both the British government and Nazi Germany. A few days later, Howard found about the rare metal Vibranium that Fortune had found in Wakanda. He was later confronted by Fortune about his double-sided arms deals to both the Nazis and British which caused him to then shut down all illicit arms dealing contracts due to the dangerous nature they had. Throughout his young adulthood, Stark worked on various government projects dating back to the World War I and World War II era, like the Super Soldier experiment with John Crowe Ransom which came to completion thanks to Steve Rogers and the Arsenal robots hidden in his mansion's basement. During the 1950s, Stark was an agent of the secret science organization known as the Brotherhood of Shield (S.H.I.E.L.D), partnered with Nathaniel Richards.

Howard Stark married Maria Collins Carbonell and together they had a son named Arno and adopted Anthony "Tony" Stark. He constantly pushed Tony to be the best, telling his son that someone must have "iron in their backbone" to be successful. Behind his heroic facade, however, he was an alcoholic who had a strained relationship with his son. Stark was capable of devotion and respect towards machines, but he appeared to have little to no interest towards his son. Due to his power as a businessman, Stark was offered membership to the exclusive Hellfire Club, but he seemed uninterested in anything other than the lavish parties the club threw.

On the Ides of March (March 15), Howard and Maria were killed in a car accident. It has been hinted that the incident was arranged by the V-Battalion, but this has never been confirmed; earlier indications were that the accident was caused by Roxxon's predecessor Republic Oil as part of Simon Krieger's corporate sabotage. Tony ran his father's company, started a charity in his mother's name, and later went on to be Iron Man.

=== Duplicate of Howard Stark ===
Iron Man discovers digital engrams of Howard and Maria within the eScape and rescues them before the eScape shuts down. Howard and Maria are transferred into digital bodies and are instructed to not leave Bain Tower, which may cause them to die. They disregard orders and leave Bain Tower, causing them to suddenly stop moving. Arno is at his work station, working on reviving his parents by recreating their Arsenal and Motherboard bodies from the eScape. As Arno becomes delusional and unstable, he is subdued and trapped in a virtual world, which Arsenal and Motherboard download themselves into.

== Other versions ==
=== House of M ===
An alternate universe version of Howard Stark from Earth-58163 appears in House of M. This version survived past Tony Stark's youth and gave control of Stark Enterprises to Tony Stark when Tony turned sixteen. Although officially listed as retired, Howard collaborates with Tony to build an armor capable of taking on the Sentinels and powerful mutants. Howard secretly plots to attack Magneto, who ambushes and kills him.

=== Iron Inquisitor ===
An alternate universe version of Howard Stark from Earth-4111 appears in Avengers (vol. 8). This version is known as the Iron Inquisitor and is an enforcer of Mephisto, who made a deal with him to grant him power and immortality in exchange for killing Tony Stark.

=== Marvel Noir ===
An alternate universe version of Howard Stark appears in Marvel Noir. This version was brainwashed by Nazi agents and became his universe's version of Baron Zemo, building war machines to aid the Nazi Party. Stark is later killed when Iron Man destroys Baron Strucker's airship.

=== Marvel Adventures ===
An alternate universe version of Howard Stark appears in Marvel Adventures Iron Man. This version is the son of inventor Arno Stark and a business partner of Obadiah Stane. Howard later disappears and leaves his family for unknown reasons, leading the young Tony to take over Stark Industries after graduating.

=== Ultimate Marvel ===
Howard Stark in Ultimate Iron Man. Art by Andy Kubert.

An alternate universe version of Howard Stark from Earth-1610 appears in the Ultimate Marvel imprint. Besides being Tony Stark's father, Howard was also the father of Gregory Stark. He was later killed in a plane accident engineered by the Mandarin company.

=== Ultimate Universe ===
An alternate universe version of Howard Stark appears in the Ultimate Universe imprint. This version previously operated as Iron Man and is a business partner of Obadiah Stane. During an international event in the City, Stark and Stane are attacked by a clone army, which Stane being killed. Stark is enlisted to help recreate the Immortus Engine, as he is believed by the Maker to be its creator. They plot against the Maker by shutting down the temporal forcefield surrounding the City, allowing Kang the Conqueror's armies to invade. Howard shuts down the damper of the Engine and causes an explosion that engulfs Kang's armies and the Maker.

== In other media ==
=== Television ===
- Howard Stark appears in Iron Man (1994), voiced by Neil Ross in "The Origin of Iron Man" and by Peter Renaday in "Not Far From The Tree". In the former episode, Howard is seemingly killed following a plane accident. In the latter episode, it is revealed that A.I.M. captured and cloned him to take over Stark Industries. While the plan is foiled, the clone escapes and vows to return.
- Howard Stark appears in Iron Man: Armored Adventures, voiced by Fred Henderson. This version was presumed dead in a plane crash and secretly captured by the Mandarin, who sought his help in finding the Makluan rings. Near the end of the series, Iron Man rescues Howard, who assists him and his allies in thwarting a Makluan invasion.
- Howard Stark appears in the introduction sequence of Marvel Anime: Iron Man.
- Howard Stark appears in Avengers Assemble, voiced by Stephen Collins in the original airing of "Thanos Rising", Troy Baker in re-airings of the aforementioned episode, and Charlie Schlatter in "New Year's Resolution". This version is the creator of Arsenal and a friend of Peggy Carter.
- Howard Stark appears in Iron Man and His Awesome Friends, voiced by John Stamos.

=== Film ===
- Early screenplay drafts written by Alfred Gough, Miles Millar, and David Hayter for New Line Cinema's Iron Man (2008) pitted Iron Man against Howard, who would have served as the main antagonist, as War Machine.
- Howard Stark appears in The Invincible Iron Man, voiced by John McCook. This version is still alive, serves as the head of Stark International, and has a strained relationship with Tony Stark over Maria Stark's death until they eventually reconcile and agree to run the company equally.

=== Marvel Cinematic Universe ===
Dominic Cooper as Howard Stark in the film Captain America: The First Avenger

Howard Stark appears in media set in the Marvel Cinematic Universe, primarily portrayed by John Slattery and Dominic Cooper. This version contributed to the Arc Reactor's creation and co-founded S.H.I.E.L.D. before he was killed by Hydra, with his death being covered up as a car accident.

- Gerard Sanders portrays Howard in a brief memorial slideshow presentation in the beginning of the live-action film Iron Man (2008).
- Slattery first portrays Howard in the live-action film Iron Man 2 (2010), in which he uses a film reel to posthumously reconcile with his son Tony Stark and help perfect the Arc Reactor.
- Cooper first portrays a younger iteration of Howard in the live-action film Captain America: The First Avenger (2011). Amidst World War II, Howard takes part in the Strategic Scientific Reserve (SSR)'s Super Soldier Project before aiding Steve Rogers in his fight against Hydra. Following Rogers's apparent death, Howard recovers the Tesseract.
- Cooper reprises his role in the live-action Marvel One-Shot film Agent Carter, in which he recruits Peggy Carter to help him form S.H.I.E.L.D. in 1946.
- Cooper reprises his role in the live-action TV series Agent Carter. In the first season, Howard tasks Carter with stopping Leviathan after the terrorists framed him for selling his technology on the black market while he goes incognito and tasks his butler Edwin Jarvis with helping Carter and secretly reporting back to him. In the second season, Howard helps Carter combat Whitney Frost after she acquires Zero Matter powers.
- Slattery reprised the role for a cameo in a flashback in the live-action film Ant-Man (2015), in which he served as a superior of Hank Pym.
- Slattery again reprised the role in a flashback in the live-action film Captain America: Civil War (2016), in which his and Maria Stark's deaths are revealed to have been committed by Hydra's brainwashed enforcer, the Winter Soldier.
- Slattery portrays an alternate timeline variant of Howard in the live-action film Avengers: Endgame, in which he encounters a time-traveling Tony.
- Cooper and Slattery voice alternate timeline variants of Howard in the Disney+ animated series What If...?.

=== Video games ===
- Howard Stark, based on Dominic Cooper's portrayal, appears in Captain America: Super Soldier, voiced by Liam O'Brien.
- Howard Stark appears in Lego Marvel Super Heroes.
- Howard Stark appears in Marvel's Midnight Suns, voiced by Peter Lurie.
- Howard Stark will appear in Marvel 1943: Rise of Hydra, voiced by Joel Johnstone.
