= Extremis =

Comic book series from Iron Man

- Cover of Iron Man: Extremis vol. 1, hardcover collected edition, art by Adi Granov
- Publisher: Marvel Comics
- Publication date: January 2005 – April 2006
- Genre: Superhero

Creative team
- Writer: Warren Ellis
- Penciller: Adi Granov
- Inker: Adi Granov
- Letterer: Randy Gentile
- Colorist: Adi Granov
- Editor(s): Tom Brevoort; Molly Lazer; Andy Schmidt; Nicole Wiley
- Paperback: ISBN 0-7851-2258-3
- Hardback: ISBN 0-7851-1612-5

"Extremis" is a six-issue story arc from the comic book series Iron Man (vol. 4), published in issues one through six in 2005 and 2006 by Marvel Comics. It was written by Warren Ellis and illustrated by Adi Granov. Extremis elevates the status quo for Iron Man, increasing the power of his armor significantly.

Extremis received mostly positive reviews, and it is often listed as one of the best Iron Man stories. Elements of Extremis were adapted for the 2008 film Iron Man, and the Iron Man: Armored Adventures episode "Extremis," and the storyline serves as the primary source material for the 2013 film Iron Man 3.

== Production ==
Extremis was the second story arc after the "Avengers Disassembled" crossover event, not to be confused with "Stark: Disassembled", a later story in The Invincible Iron Man.

The story was meant as a sort of "new start" for the character—to redefine him from his origins as an arms dealer, to be the "test pilot for the future" Ellis intended him to be. The story rarely mentions any of Iron Man's past, and references to the rest of the Marvel universe are limited to brief, passing mentions of the Avengers and Fin Fang Foom. Warren Ellis admitted he had intentionally not read any Iron Man material besides the earliest issues.

This is similar for Adi Granov: "My first official introduction to the character occurred a year prior to Extremis. [...] Upon reading the script, I realized how realistic Warren's approach was to the story. [...] When illustrating the book I wanted my art to mirror the realism in Warren's writing [...] I felt that Warren wrote a story that's a sort of techno-thriller action story and I wanted the art to reflect this. [...] I saw Iron Man as not just a superhero in a suit; rather he is a pilot or weapon. To me, the Iron Man armor is more akin to a jet fighter than it is to an outfit.

The story, which lasts about three to four days in comic book time, takes place at an undefined time after the founding of the New Avengers and before the destruction of Stamford, Connecticut by Nitro (which led to the Marvel Civil War).

== Plot ==
Three men enter a disused slaughterhouse in Bastrop, Texas, where two of them inject a willing third, whom they call Mallen. This injection contains an experimental drug which makes him fall to the floor in immense pain. Mallen's compatriots flee the room, locking him in.

Miles underground in his Coney Island "garage", Tony Stark is awakened from sleep and several weeks of work, isolation, and diminished self care by his secretary's phone call, reminding him of a scheduled interview with a journalist. During the interview, it emerges that Stark deeply regrets that the world-changing, humanitarian improvements he had hoped to fund with his weapons sales have not yet materialized. Confronted by his regrets, Stark returns to the garage, takes stock of himself while realizing that the Iron Man is likely his key to a better future for both himself and humanity. Having canceled all appointments, Stark dons the newest version of the Iron Man armor and takes off into the sky.

At Futurepharm Corporation offices in Austin, Aldrich Killian commits suicide after typing and printing his confession. The note informs co-worker Maya Hansen that he has stolen and "loosed" the company's Extremis serum for a greater purpose. Hansen calls Stark, whom she met years prior.

Stark arrives in Texas in the middle of a teleconference with his board of directors, rejecting their requests that he resign as CEO of his company and take a head technician title instead. Stark argues that Stark Industries, having invented a revolutionary cell phone and connection method, no longer needs the government's funding. The conference ends at a crossroad. Arriving at Futurepharm, Stark learns that the intended receiver of the Extremis dose is currently unknown due to an inability to hack Killian's computer. Using Stark Industries's new prototype phone, Stark emails Killian's hard drive to be hacked by one of his employees, and, to distract Hansen, jets her and himself to San Diego to talk with their old friend and teacher, Sal Kennedy.

Meanwhile, the three men from the slaughterhouse arrive at the FBI field office. While Kennedy, now a futurist following nature and an idealistic way of life, harangues Stark and Hansen on their military work and thus-far-failed promise, Mallen sets the FBI office on fire. Hansen catches the story on the news, realizing that the terrorists are using Extremis. In flight back to Texas, Hansen tells Stark that Extremis is a military nanotechnology serum created in an attempt to recreate the Captain America Super-Soldier Serum.

Iron Man tracks the terrorists' van from above and tears it in half with a non-lethal repulsor ray. Mallen recovers, and after refusing to surrender peacefully, engages Iron Man in a brutal fight. Throughout the battle, it becomes obvious that Mallen's abilities far surpass the processing speed and durability of Iron Man's armor. Mallen flees, leaving Stark trapped beneath a burning car with his armor at zero power. Stark saves himself and the car's passengers by drawing from the flames' thermal energy to reactivate his armor.

Iron Man calls Hansen and has her people fly him to Futurepharm, where he privately reveals himself as Tony Stark to Hansen. Knowing the severity of his injuries, Stark realizes the only way for him to survive and defeat Mallen is to use Extremis himself. Hansen gives Stark a lower dose of the serum that will not alter his mind and body as it did for Mallen. Twenty-four hours later, Stark awakens with his armor integrated into his body.

Tapping into a satellite cluster, Iron Man finds Mallen heading towards Washington, intent on killing the president. Having the police evacuate the city, Iron Man confronts Mallen. Now superior to Mallen, Iron Man explains that he had to be the one to stop the terrorist, seeing Mallen as a perversion of himself: a man with power but no concern for or ability to see the future. In the end, Mallen refuses to listen, pins Stark to the ground, and violently declares, "There isn't any future. I'm gonna kill it!". Enraged by Mallen's refusal to give up, as well as his contempt for all life, Iron Man kills him.

Confronting Hansen at Futurepharm, Iron Man reveals that Hansen was clearly Killian's accomplice, due to the issue of needing two key cards entered at the same time as well as her extensive involvement with the formula. Hansen allows herself to be taken away, though she justifies her actions by comparing the Extremis serum to the atomic bomb, saying, "It had to be used once in anger so that it would never be used in anger again." Hansen then declares that Tony is no better than she is, to which Iron Man replies "No. But I'm trying to be... And tomorrow I'll be able to look myself in the mirror."

== The Extremis virus ==
Extremis is referred to as a "virus" throughout the story. The verbatim description offered by its inventor Maya Hansen, goes: "...Extremis is a super-soldier solution. It's a bio-electronics package, fitted into a few billion graphite nanotubes and suspended in a carrier fluid. A magic bullet, like the original super-soldier serum—all fitted into a single injection. It hacks the body's repair center—the part of the brain that keeps a complete blue print of the human body. When we're injured, we refer to that area of the brain to heal properly. Extremis rewrites the repair center. In the first stage, the body essentially becomes an open wound. The normal human blueprint is being replaced with the Extremis blueprint. The brain is being told the body is wrong. Extremis protocol dictates that the subject be placed on life support and intravenously fed nutrients at this point. For the next two or three days, the patient remains unconscious within a cocoon of scabs. (...) Extremis uses the nutrients and body mass to grow new organs. Better ones..."

Effects of the Extremis process, apart from the changes specific to Tony Stark, included: greatly accelerated healing; immensely-boosted immune system; generation of "new, improved organs" (Stark's cardiovascular and respiratory systems were greatly upgraded); and, the side effect of increased aggressiveness. Stark had the super-powers removed from the Extremis compiler, though, effectively 'exchanging' them for the ability to interface directly with machines and his own armor. But Mallen retained said super-powers, resulting in his high-level super-strength, super-speed, advanced invulnerability, and the abilities to breathe fire and project arcs of electricity from his hands, as well as being bullet-proof.

As well as the obvious physical changes, Extremis also affected Stark mentally, allowing him to process information extraordinarily quickly, on a subconscious level, to help him better cope with the direct technological link he now possessed to his armor (even as his standard thought processes remained at a human norm). As a result, his brain, taking in more information than he could consciously process, began to sublimate it into his unconscious mind, causing Stark to experience occasional hallucinations of particularly relevant information, manifesting as people whose deaths he felt personally responsible for, such as Captain America or Happy Hogan. These hallucinations served to make him aware of facts that he had noted subconsciously while not recognizing their relevance or existence on a conscious level, such as that a member of the Initiative had lied about his powers (he claimed to just have superhuman physical abilities when he actually manipulated gravity to create the appearance of superstrength, as otherwise he couldn't be given an IV while in hospital as he would have had invulnerable skin), or that Maya Hansen was actually alive after her death was faked. Doc Samson speculated that the hallucinations appeared because the excess information was filtered into the same place Stark subconsciously stored his guilt to stop himself facing it.

When the Mandarin attempts to release Extremis on a large scale as part of his plan to 'reshape' the human race, it is revealed that Maya's initial version of Extremis can only be successful when used on people who possess a rare genetic sequence, found in only 2.5% of the human population. This percentage includes Tony Stark and Maya Hansen, but does not include the Mandarin. Anyone without this sequence who is exposed to Extremis will be killed by it.

When industrialist Michael Hall attempts to create his own suits of armor based on the Carnage symbiote, Iron Man attempts to hack the suits, but Carnage is able to "hack" Iron Man in return by using the technological/biological interface elements of Extremis.

=== Legacy ===
During the 2010 "Stark: Disassembled" storyline, Tony Stark is forced to erase portions of his memory in order to prevent Norman Osborn from gaining access to the list of people registered under the Superhuman Registration Act. These actions resulted in his falling into a persistent vegetative state, in which his brain is unable to even regulate the autonomic functions of his body. During this period, Stark's colleagues play a recorded holographic message from Stark, which reveal that when the extraterrestrial Skrulls invaded Earth during the 2008 "Secret Invasion" storyline, they attacked Stark's Extremis, permanently shutting it down. Stark's mind is "rebooted" using information that he had saved when he first injected himself with Extremis, with the result that he loses all memory of the actions he had committed after receiving the Extremis upgrade, although he has spent time researching his activities between then and his restoration. Stark later discovers that his brain still has access to Extremis, which he began using again.

During the 2012 "Believe" story arc, Stark learns that Maya Hansen has been killed and various new versions of Extremis have been released onto the black market, prompting him to track them down and eliminate them.

When Bruce Banner is shot in the head by the Ancient Order of the Shield, Stark uses Extremis to heal the damage to Banner's brain and restore him to full mental health without any of the usual side effects or powers. During the "Original Sin" storyline, Banner learns that Stark had tampered with the original gamma bomb and was thus indirectly responsible for Banner's transformation into the Hulk. Banner uses Extremis to modify his usual transformation, creating a new Hulk persona known as Doc Green who retains Banner's intellect and the Hulk's strength.

During the 2014 "AXIS" storyline, Tony Stark is among those who experience a moral inversion due to the Scarlet Witch's spell. He experiences a new surge of his more negative traits such as his ego, irresponsibility, and alcoholism, culminating in him releasing a new version of Extremis onto San Francisco. This new version, known as the Extremis 3.0 app, could offer beauty, health or even immortality for free, but Stark subsequently ends the free trial mode and starts charging the app in a daily fee basis. This prompts Pepper Potts, Daredevil, and an artificial intelligence based on Stark's mind to stop him. Stark's plan is ended when Potts exposes his true feelings about the world after his inversion. Following the eight-month ellipsis after "Secret Wars", Stark returns to his normal self with no signs of his moral inversion personality.

== Reception ==
Extremis received favorable reviews, and is often listed as one of the best Iron Man stories.

== In other media ==
=== Marvel Cinematic Universe ===
Iron Man's armor and origin as depicted in the 2008 Marvel Cinematic Universe film Iron Man closely resemble those introduced in Extremis. Based on his work on the story arc, artist Adi Granov was brought on as a producer for the film, who went on to create the final designs for Iron Man's armor. "Extremis and Beyond" is included as a special feature on the DVD release.

The Extremis storyline serves as the primary source material for the 2013 film Iron Man 3, with characters Maya Hansen and Aldrich Killian being adapted and elements of characters like Mallen being incorporated into Eric Savin. Although the exact nature of Extremis is subtly changed, the key powers of enhanced strength and fire generation remain, although the enhanced soldiers are not as powerful as Mallen.

The Extremis serum appears in the TV series Agents of S.H.I.E.L.D., continuing plot threads from Iron Man 3. The pilot episode introduces Mike Peterson, a former factory worker who was injected by Hydra branch Project Centipede with an experimental serum derived in part from Extremis. In the episodes "T.A.H.I.T.I." and "Ragtag", Phil Coulson's team discover Centipede's research was meant to restore John Garrett's failing cybernetic implants. Raina combines the Centipede serum with the Kree-based GH-325 serum to stabilize Garrett at the cost of Garrett's sanity.

An Extremis soldier appears in the film Shang-Chi and the Legend of the Ten Rings as a participant in the Golden Daggers Club.

The Secret Invasion episode "Promises" reveals that Gravik's Skrull group has a sample of an unidentified Extremis patient.

=== Television ===
The Extremis mini-series was loosely adapted as an Iron Man: Armored Adventures episode of the same name. Mallen, an ex-agent of S.H.I.E.L.D. rather than a terrorist, injects himself with the formula after being fired by Nick Fury and badly injures Iron Man during their initial encounter. In response, Tony injects himself with a modified version of the Extremis formula, allowing him to fully interface with his armor, along with all other forms of technology. According to Andros Stark in the episode "Iron Man 2099", everyone has an upgraded version of Extremis by 2099 while he is running version 16.5 named J.A.R.V.I.S.

=== Video games ===
- Iron Man wears the Extremis suit in Marvel vs. Capcom 3: Fate of Two Worlds, as well as the follow-up Ultimate Marvel vs. Capcom 3.
- Iron Man wears the Extremis suit in Marvel: Ultimate Alliance 2 as his primary and first costume.
- The Extremis Suit appears as an optional suit in the Wii and DS versions of the Iron Man 2 video game.
- Extremis soldiers are featured in Iron Man 3: The Official Game.
- Extremis appears in Marvel: Avengers Alliance.
- Extremis soldiers appear in Lego Marvel Super Heroes.

=== Merchandise ===
- Hasbro released a 6-inch Marvel Legends Extremis figure and variant blue stealth version in 2012 and a 3.75 inch version in the Marvel Universe toyline. The MU version has been reissued in a comic pack.
- A 6-inch action figure of Iron Man featuring the Extremis armor was released in the first wave of the return of Marvel Legends in 2012 with a blue stealth variant. A re-release of the figure in darker colors was planned for the movie based toy line "Iron Man: Armored Avenger" before the line was cancelled.

=== Miscellaneous ===
In 2010, Marvel Knights Animation adapted Extremis into a motion comic with 3D cel-shading graphics. The six-part mini-series was released by Shout! Factory first on DVD and later coupled with Spider-Woman: Agent of S.W.O.R.D. on Blu-ray.

=== Novel ===
A novel adaption of Iron Man: Extremis, written and adapted by comic writer and editor Marie Javins, was released in May 2013 to tie-in with the release of the Iron Man 3 film as part of the Marvel Prose Novel series. A GraphicAudio dramatisation of the comic was adapted from this novelisation.
