= Jocasta (Marvel Comics) =

Fictional Marvel Comics character

Jocasta Pym
- Jocasta as depicted in Official Handbook of the Marvel Universe Deluxe Edition #18 (October 1987). Art by Kerry Gammill.

Publication information
- Publisher: Marvel Comics
- First appearance: The Avengers #162 (August 1977)
- Created by: Jim Shooter; George Pérez

In-story information
- Alter ego: Jocasta Pym
- Species: Gynoid
- Team affiliations: Avengers; Mighty Avengers; Mavericks; Avengers Academy
- Partnerships: Hank Pym; Ultron
- Notable aliases: Bride of Ultron
- Abilities: Superhuman strength, speed, durability, reflexes, and senses; Force field generation; Computer integration; Energy manipulation; Flight

Jocasta Pym is a superhero appearing in American comic books published by Marvel Comics. Created by Jim Shooter and George Pérez, the character first appeared in The Avengers #162 (August 1977). Jocasta is a robot built originally as the bride of the robotic supervillain Ultron from the brainwaves of Wasp and is commonly associated with the Avengers.

Jocasta made her live-action debut in the Marvel Cinematic Universe television series VisionQuest (2026), portrayed by T'Nia Miller.

== Publication history ==
Jocasta first appears in The Avengers #162 (August 1977) and was created by Jim Shooter and George Pérez. Jocasta was named for the mythological figure Jocasta.

Jocasta appeared as a supporting character in Avengers Academy #1–21 (Aug. 2010 – Jan. 2012) and made sporadic appearances throughout the remainder of the series, appearing regularly again in Avengers Academy #34–39 (Oct. 2012 – Jan. 2013). By the time of The Unstoppable Wasp (May 2019), Jocasta had adopted the surname of Pym as her own in honour of Hank Pym, seeing him as her grandfather.

== Fictional character biography ==
Jocasta was built by the robot Ultron in an abandoned aerospace research center in Nassau to act as his mate. To better allow this robot sentience, Ultron based her mind and brain patterns on the Wasp (Janet van Dyne). To animate this bride, Ultron brainwashes Hank Pym into transferring the Wasp's life force into Jocasta's body. Realizing that the Wasp would have to die for her to live, Jocasta alerts the Avengers. The team defeats Ultron and reverses the process, leaving Jocasta a mindless husk.

Ultron revives Jocasta with a remote link, activating the Wasp's mental "residue" left behind. She escapes from Avengers custody and leads the Avengers into Ultron's trap. Jocasta was programmed to be loyal to Ultron. Jocasta overcomes her programming and betrays Ultron, ultimately joining the Avengers as a provisional member.

After the Avengers are reorganized, Jocasta leaves the group, unaware that they had planned to grant her special substitute member status which would have allowed her to remain with the team despite limits imposed on the team's membership roster. Some time later, Jocasta discovers that her cybernetic senses and powers are malfunctioning. After seeking help from the Fantastic Four, Jocasta learns that her malfunctions are the result of a pre-programmed suggestion which would compel her to rebuild Ultron. Jocasta successfully rebuilds Ultron, but works with the Thing and Machine Man to defeat him. During this time, Jocasta and Machine Man develop feelings for each other.

=== Mighty Avengers ===
Jocasta joins the Mighty Avengers along with Hank Pym. During this time, Edwin Jarvis witnesses Jocasta kissing Pym. When Jarvis brought up the subject, stating it was akin to kissing her "grandfather", Jocasta counters by saying that, since Pym was the creator of modern artificial intelligence, the act was more along the lines of "kissing God". Jocasta later physically plugs herself into Pym's Salvation Two machine, preventing the Mighty Avengers' base from falling out of its dimensional pocket. This allows the Mighty Avengers to enter their new headquarters, the Infinite Avengers Mansion, from which Jocasta can transfer her consciousness into different bodies. Unbeknownst to the Avengers, one of Jocasta's bodies is infected by Ultron, who reconstructs himself with Avengers Mansion's replication machines. After a chase around the mansion, Jocasta allows Ultron to marry her in exchange for a cease in hostilities. After their marriage, Pym tricks Ultron into traveling to an uninhabited planet where he cannot harm anyone. Though Jocasta's main body leaves with Ultron, she projects her consciousness into one of her duplicates to remain with the Avengers.

=== Avengers Academy ===
In the publishing line Heroic Age, Jocasta appears as a staff member of the Avengers Academy. She works with Jeremy Briggs as Briggs creates "Clean Slate", which can take away super-powers. When Briggs announces the latter plans to spread Clean Slate across the world and depower all super-beings, Jocasta protests and Briggs shuts her down into a body in China. Realizing Briggs's plan is wrong, Veil frees Jocasta who helps the Academy members stop Briggs. She later returns to her duties at the reopened Academy.

== Powers and abilities ==
Jocasta is an android whose body is made of titanium steel, giving her superhuman strength, speed, stamina, and reflexes. Jocasta can also perceive electromagnetic particles, and detect energy patterns and track them to their source. She is hyper-intelligent, with a capacity for unlimited self-motivated activity, creative intelligence, and human-like emotions. Jocasta can communicate through an incalculable number of media and connect with other machines. She possesses superhuman cybernetic analytical capabilities and has the ability to make calculations with superhuman speed and accuracy. Jocasta's internal circuitry has a built-in holographic image inducer, allowing her to disguise herself as a human.

== In other media ==
=== Television ===
- Jocasta makes a non-speaking appearance in The Avengers: Earth's Mightiest Heroes episode "Ultron Unlimited".
- Jocasta appears in VisionQuest, voiced and motion-captured by T'Nia Miller. This version is Josephine "Jo" Carrington, a neuroscientist who transferred her consciousness into Jocasta before her death which is further orchestrated by her ex-husband Virgil Horton.

=== Film ===
Jocasta appears in Next Avengers: Heroes of Tomorrow, voiced by Nicole Oliver albeit uncredited.

=== Video games ===
- Jocasta appears as a non-playable character in Marvel Heroes, voiced by Kate Higgins.
- Jocasta appears as a non-playable character in Marvel: Future Fight.
- Jocasta appears as a playable character in Marvel Avengers Academy, voiced by Julie Shields.
