= Machine Man =

Fictional character appearing in Marvel Comics

- The two identities of X-51: Aaron Stack (foreground) and Machine Man (background). Art by Brandon Peterson.

Publication information
- Publisher: Marvel Comics
- First appearance: 2001: A Space Odyssey #8 (July 1977)
- Created by: Jack Kirby (writer/artist)

In-story information
- Full name: Aaron Stack
- Team affiliations: S.H.I.E.L.D. Secret Avengers; Nextwave; Avengers; West Coast Avengers; Heavy Metal; A.R.M.O.R. Operation: Lightning Storm; Ancient Order of the Shield; Mercs for Money; A.I. Army
- Notable aliases: X-51, Mister Machine
- Abilities: Superhuman strength, speed, stamina, durability, reflexes and accuracy; Telescoping arms and legs; Can fly by using anti-gravity disks; Various installed weapons

Machine Man (also known as Aaron Stack, Mister Machine and serial number Z2P45-9-X-51 or X-51 for short) is an android superhero appearing in American comic books published by Marvel Comics. The character was created by Jack Kirby for 2001: A Space Odyssey #8 (July 1977), a comic written and drawn by Kirby featuring concepts based on the eponymous 1968 Stanley Kubrick feature film and Arthur C. Clarke's 1968 novel. Shortly thereafter, Machine Man spun off into his own Kirby-created series. He is a robot, the only survivor of a series, raised as a human son of scientist Abel Stack, who was killed removing his auto-destruct mechanism, and further evolved to sentience by a Monolith.

== Publication history ==
=== Volume 1 ===
Machine Man originally appeared in the pages of 2001: A Space Odyssey #8 (July 1977), which was written and drawn by Jack Kirby, where he was called Mister Machine. He went on to appear in his own self-titled series in 1978.

This title featured Machine Man entering the mainstream Marvel Universe. Jack Kirby wrote and drew the first nine issues, which dealt with the title character's status as a fugitive from the military after the death of his creator, and his first interactions with mankind. The book was canceled at the end of 1978 with X-51 finally standing up to the military. Machine Man appeared next in a three issue story arc within the pages of The Incredible Hulk vol. 2 #235–237, battling the Hulk within the suburban setting of his human friend Peter Spaulding. By the end of the storyline, he incurred a complete system shutdown, leading to the events portrayed in his relaunched monthly series. The title was relaunched in issue #10 after a nine-month hiatus. Status quo in the book changed with Machine Man now living amongst humanity, and dealing with his own new-found emotions. Marv Wolfman came aboard as the new writer, partnered with artist Steve Ditko, which helped set a different tone from Kirby's previous stories. Issue #15 saw a new writer, Tom DeFalco, taking over the writing chores. The title lasted until issue #19, ending in Feb. 1980.

=== Volume 2 ===
In Oct. 1984–Jan. 1985, the Machine Man title was resurrected, in a four-issue miniseries written by Tom DeFalco with art by Herb Trimpe (breakdowns only, issues #1–3) and Barry Windsor-Smith (finishes only, issues #1–3 and full art for issue #4), with Windsor-Smith also coloring the entire miniseries and co-plotting issue #4 with DeFalco. This series turned out to be one of the most popular of all the Machine Man titles, tying with previous continuity, but with the action set in the distant cyberpunk future of 2020, starting with Machine Man's reassembly. The miniseries was first reprinted as a 96-page trade paperback in 1988 (ISBN 978-0-07-135458-5), with brand new cover art by Barry Windsor-Smith. The miniseries was republished again in 1994 as two double-size books, with the name Machine Man 2020. Characters from this alternate future have made appearances in other Marvel books, namely Arno Stark, the mercenary Iron Man 2020. In 2013, many of Arno Stark’s adventures were collected in the Iron Man 2020 TPB, which included all 4 issues of Machine Man volume 2.

=== Volume 3 ===
In 1999, Marvel brought the character back in the series X-51, The Machine Man in which Machine Man experiences a programming malfunction: he would uncontrollably attack any mutant he encountered. He was given a drastically more robotic look and his powers were vastly changed. The reason for both was that he had been reconstructed by Sentinel-based nanotechnology. The series lasted twelve issues; in the final one, he was 'recovered' by a Celestial, as the Celestials—revealed to be the power behind the Monoliths—had become interested in Machine Man.

== Fictional character biography ==
Aaron Stack

Machine Man, whose real name is Z2P45-9-X-51, is the last of a series of sentient robots created at the Broadhurst Center for the Advancement of Mechanized Research in Central City, California, by robotics expert Abel Stack for the US Army. The previous 50 experimental robots went mad as they achieved sentience and became psychotic due to a lack of identity. X-51 was the only survivor, as he was treated as a son by Stack and given a human face mask as well as being exposed to a monolith. After Stack died trying to protect him, X-51 assumed the human name Aaron Stack and escaped confinement, only to be relentlessly pursued by the army. While on the run, the newly christened Machine Man initiated contact with humanity in order to better understand it.

Machine Man assists the X-Men in battling Bastion and his Sentinels. As a consequence, he is infected by Sentinel programming, assuming a more robotic look and losing self-control whenever he is faced with a mutant. During this series, Machine Man is on the run from Sebastian Shaw, who wants his technology for himself. Because of his new programming, while seeking aid from the Avengers, he attacks Justice and Firestar. Because of his actions against Justice and Firestar, Machine Man's membership in the Avengers is revoked. At the end of the series X-51, Machine Man encounters one of the monoliths and disappears. He is summoned by the monolith's creators, the Celestials.

=== Nextwave: Agents of H.A.T.E. ===
Warren Ellis and Stuart Immonen's Nextwave series sees Machine Man join a team formed by the Highest Anti-Terrorism Effort, or H.A.T.E. (a subsidiary of the Beyond Corporation) to fight Unusual Weapons of Mass Destruction. Now preferring simply to be called Aaron, Machine Man is partnered with Monica Rambeau, Tabitha Smith, Elsa Bloodstone, and The Captain, and the team soon discovers that H.A.T.E. are funded by the Beyond Corporation, leading them to go rogue and carry out their mission on their own prerogative. It is revealed that, after being brought to space by the Celestials at the conclusion of his previous series, he was returned to Earth because the Celestials considered him to be a "complete and utter ☠☠☠☠". (Note: "☠☠☠☠" represents an unspecified, but extremely offensive, profanity throughout the Nextwave series.)

=== The Initiative ===
Aaron with his Monica Rambeau LMD. Art by Adriana Melo.

While trying to convince Captain America of the rightness of his position, Iron Man tells of the time Machine Man came to visit him. Machine Man was seeking to compare notes with Iron Man, thought to be a robot by Machine Man. Drunk, irate, and under stress from the machinations of Obadiah Stane, Iron Man attacks Machine Man and almost kills two of his own employees. At the last possible second, Machine Man pushes them out of the way. Iron Man uses this incident as the need for accountability in the superhero population. Machine Man reveals that Maria Hill offered him financial compensation to join the Initiative, enraging Ms. Marvel, who had supported it from the beginning, for free. In addition to financial compensation, S.H.I.E.L.D. provides Machine Man with a Life Model Decoy of Monica Rambeau.

=== Marvel Zombies 3 ===
After zombies invade the Earth-616, Machine Man and Jocasta go to the Marvel Zombies universe to retrieve a blood sample from an uninfected human. Unbeknownst to them, a zombie Morbius plans to use the blood to infect the Marvel Universe.

=== Working with Red Hulk ===
Under orders from Steve Rogers, Machine Man teams up with Red Hulk, who is tracking down Qatari rebel Dagan Shah. Machine Man and Red Hulk arrive in Sharzhad, where they find Shah in the disguise of Arabian Knight. Once the two are inside the palace, Shah sheds his disguise, reveals his true identity as the Sultan Magus, and imprisons them. After the real Arabian Knight is freed from his imprisonment, Red Hulk and Machine Man continue their fight with Magus until Reginald Fortean arrives and ends the fight. Fortean states to Red Hulk and Machine Man that Sharzhad has been recognized as a nation by the Arab League and states that they are trespassing.

=== Marvel NOW! (2016) ===
In Marvel NOW!, Machine Man appears as an employee of Umbral Dynamics. Machine Man later appears as a member of Domino's incarnation of the Mercs for Money.

During the "Iron Man 2020" storyline, Machine Man joins the A.I. Army.

During the "One World Under Doom" storyline, Machine Man is captured by Doctor Doom to work for him as his think tank. He alongside Thunderbolt Ross, Simon Ryker, and Deathlok escape from prison. They are soon confronted by a Doombot army as Doom demands their surrender. Ryker is attacked, but Ross, Deathlok, and Machine Man escape. Taking refuge in a house, Machine Man is rebuilt and recharged by Deathlok. Ross, Machine Man, and Deathlok arrive at the border of Latveria and meet with the U.S. Army, only to be arrested for treason.

== Powers and abilities ==
Machine Man was constructed by unnamed computer engineering specialists under Oliver Broadhurst at the Broadhurst Center for the Advancement of Mechanized Research; Abel Stack was his chief programmer. Machine Man's robotic materials, design, and construction (titanium alloy) provide him with a number of abilities, as does his adamantium composition. He possesses superhuman strength, speed, stamina, durability, and reflexes. He is an expert on his own construction and repair. Machine Man has superhuman visual acuity. He possesses an above normal intellect, with a capacity for unlimited self-motivated activity, creative intelligence, and human-like emotions. He has superhuman cybernetic analytical capabilities, including the ability to process information and make calculations with superhuman speed and accuracy.

Machine Man is primarily powered by solar energy and can also draw power from several different external-energy source if needed. Machine Man has the ability to telescope his arms and legs to a length of 100 feet (30 m). Machine Man's hands are equipped with variable-payload fingers, some routinely carried in his fingers, others stored in hidden recesses in his belt. His fingers contain a different variety of devices, including: gas chromatograph, laser interferometer, micro-pulse radar, audiometer, seismometer, gravity-wave detector, pulse-code modulator, standard-computer input/outputs, radio beacon, all-wave transceiver, laser-cutting torch/weapon, and projection of heat, cold, or electricity; one of his fingers has been shown to contain a bullet-firing mechanism that uses .357 Magnum ammunition. He has the ability of flight under his own power through the means of anti-gravity disks.

During the X-51 series, Machine Man had a few extra features thanks to nanotechnology within him at the time. This mainly included parts of himself being rebuilt if damaged, also causing many changes in his look from issue to issue. He also had a beam cannon on his chest. In Nextwave, he has become a living Swiss Army knife of sorts, containing various tools and weapons for a multitude of situations, both useful and esoteric. In the Point One event, as many other heroes, Machine Man was slightly revamped, gaining new powers and abilities. Now being a cross between the nano-technological being in the X-51 miniseries and the living Swiss Army knife of Nextwave, Machine Man is now suffused with nanites able to effortlessly change his appearance from his earliest, jump-suited look to the more-humanoid looks of Nextwave. Also, his nanotechnology allows him to transform and rebuild every piece of machinery he comes in contact with, such as building an anti-gravity vehicle out of a motorcycle.

== Collected editions ==
Title	Material Collected	Published Date	ISBN
Marvel Zombies 3	Marvel Zombies 3 #1-4	April 22, 2009	978-0-7851-3635-4
Machine Man by Kirby & Ditko: The Complete Collection	Machine Man (vol. 1) #1-19 and Incredible Hulk #235-237	August 9, 2016	978-0-7851-9577-1
Iron Man 2020: Robot Revolution – Force Works	2020 Machine Man #1-2 and 2020 Force Works #1-3, 2020 Iron Age #1	November 3, 2020	978-1-3029-2553-6

== Other versions ==
=== Earth X ===
An alternate universe version of Machine Man from Earth-9997 appears in "Earth X". This version was forced to become the new Watcher by Uatu, who was blinded by Black Bolt.

=== Marvel Zombies ===
An alternate universe version of Machine Man from Earth-2149 appears in "Marvel Zombies", where he is destroyed by the zombified Power Pack.

=== Queen's Vengeance ===
When Morgan le Fay restructured reality in Avengers (vol. 3), nearly all of the Avengers were transformed into members of the Queen's Vengeance, a sort of medieval-themed Avengers, with Machine Man becoming Sir MacHinery.

=== Ultimate Marvel ===
The Ultimate Marvel version of Machine Man is Danny Ketch who sacrificed his life during Galactus' assault on Earth via MODOK. Ketch's consciousness is later revealed to have survived inside a robotic body and is dubbed "Machine Man" by Phil Coulson. As Machine Man, Ketch joins the Future Foundation under Coulson.

== In other media ==
Machine Man appears in Spider-Man Unlimited, voiced by Dale Wilson. This version was intended to serve as an enforcer to the High Evolutionary alongside the other Machine Men, but was rejected due to being obsolete and set to be disassembled before Spider-Man saves him. Machine Man goes on to join a resistance against the High Evolutionary.
