= Maria Stark =

Marvel Comics fictional character

Publication information
- Publisher: Marvel Comics
- First appearance: Iron Man #104 (November 1977)
- Created by: Bill Mantlo (writer); George Tuska (artist)

In-story information
- Alter ego: Maria Collins Carbonell
- Species: Human
- Team affiliations: Stark Industries

Maria Collins Stark (née Carbonell) is a character appearing in American comic books published by Marvel Comics. She is Howard Stark's wife and Tony Stark's mother.

== Fictional character biography ==
Maria Stark was born into a wealthy family in Southampton, New York. In her adulthood, she became a socialite and philanthropist. She dated Obadiah Stane. While staying in Monaco during a flight scale, Maria escaped from her bodyguards at a casino, where she deliberately lost large sums of money at baccarat and was escorted from the premises. Howard Stark, who owned the casino, noticed her being forcefully escorted by her bodyguards and they followed her back to her hotel room. Maria and Howard formed an unlikely duo as they successfully took down the guards and escaped in a car.

Maria married Howard sometime later, and together they had their son Tony Stark. Maria was unsuccessful in preventing Tony from seeing Howard's alcoholism, something Tony would later face. Howard secretly programmed the Mistress AI that controlled the Arsenal robots with Maria's brain patterns.

On the Ides of March, Maria and Howard are killed in a car accident arranged by the Roxxon Oil Company. Tony takes control of his father's company and starts a charity in his mother's name, which finances various charities and renovation projects as well as the Avengers.

=== Duplicate of Maria Stark ===
Iron Man discovers digital engrams of Howard and Maria within the eScape and rescues them before the eScape shuts down. Howard and Maria are transferred into digital bodies and are instructed to not leave Bain Tower, which may cause them to die. They disregard orders and leave Bain Tower, causing them to suddenly stop moving. Arno Stark revives his parents by recreating their Arsenal and Motherboard bodies from the eScape. As Arno becomes delusional and unstable, he is subdued and trapped in a virtual world, which Arsenal and Motherboard download themselves into.

== Other versions ==
The Ultimate Marvel version of the character is renamed Maria Cerrera, the second wife of Howard Stark. Maria was a brilliant scientist who suffered a genetic accident while she was pregnant with her and Howard's child. After Maria died during childbirth, Howard uses a newly invented biological armor to save the life of their son named after Antonio Cerrera (Maria's brother) who died at a young age. These events were later retconned as an in-universe television series about Iron Man's life.

== In other media ==
- A version of Maria Stark, named Martha Stark, appears in the Iron Man episode "The Origin of Iron Man", voiced by Dimitra Arliss.
- Maria Stark appears in Captain America: Civil War, portrayed by Hope Davis. This version was killed by the Winter Soldier under Hydra orders, which was covered up and reported to be a car crash. Producer Kevin Feige revealed that another actress had been cast to appear as the character in Iron Man 3 in a flashback sequence that did not make the final cut.
