= List of Marvel Comics characters: J =

== Jackdaw ==
- Further reading: Jackdaw at the Comic Book DB (archived from the original)

Jackdaw is a character featured in the Marvel Comics universe. He was created by Dez Skinn, Steve Parkhouse, Paul Neary and John Stokes, and first appeared in The Incredible Hulk Weekly #57 (April 1980).

Jackdaw is an Otherworld elf and the sidekick of Captain Britain. Jackdaw had been mortally wounded earlier in his adventures, but was revived by Merlyn and given new powers and a new costume.

Jackdaw is torn in half by one of Fury's energy bolts and dies in Captain Britain's arms. Jackdaw expressed a belief that Merlyn would resurrect him again. Merlyn refuses to resurrect Jackdaw as it would have damaged his chances of resurrecting Captain Britain, who was also killed by Fury.

== Jackpot ==
Jackpot is the name of several characters appearing in American comic books published by Marvel Comics.

== Luke Jacobson ==
Luke Jacobson is a character appearing in American comic books published by Marvel Comics. The character, created by Martha Thomases and Tony Salmons, first appeared in Dakota North #1 (June 1986).

Luke Jacobson is a prominent fashion designer. When he was faced with sabotage, Jacobson enlisted the aid of Dakota North.

=== Luke Jacobson in other media ===
Luke Jacobson appears in She-Hulk: Attorney at Law, portrayed by Griffin Matthews. This version specializes in making outfits for superheroes.

== Jade Dragon ==
Jade Dragon is a character portrayed in the Marvel Comics universe. He was created by Jim Krueger, Alex Ross, and John Paul Leon, and first appeared in Earth X #2 (May 1999).

Little is known of Jade Dragon's history before his exposure to Terrigen Mist on Earth-9997. Once exposed to the mist, he mutated into a dragon-like form and became a slave to the Skull, who gained the ability to control the minds of others after exposure to the mist. The Skull intended to take over first New York City, then the world. Along with the Skull's other slaves, he was forced to fight a team of super-mutants led by Captain America; in the end, the Skull was killed and his slaves were freed. Jade Dragon would move on to work alongside Iron Maiden, Black Bolt, and the Iron Avengers.

== J. Jonah Jackal ==
J. Jonah Jackal is an anthropomorphic jackal and animal version of J. Jonah Jameson who is the boss of Spider-Ham.

=== J. Jonah Jackal in other media ===
J. Jonah Jackal appears in the Ultimate Spider-Man episode "The Spider-Verse", voiced by J.K. Simmons.

== Jagged Bow ==
Jagged Bow is a fictional character appearing in American comic books published by Marvel Comics. He first appeared in The Amazing Spider-Man #367 (October 1992) and was created by David Michelinie and Jerry Bingham.

Jagged Bow is a mercenary trained by the Taskmaster, who was under contract by the Red Skull to create a team of mercenaries who would be capable of defeating Spider-Man. He and his allies Death-Shield and Blood Spider are respectively patterned after the superheroes Hawkeye, Captain America, and Spider-Man.

== J. Jonah "Jay" Jameson Sr. ==
John (J.) Jonah "Jay" Jameson Sr. is a character appearing in American comic books published by Marvel Comics. He is the father of J. Jonah Jameson, and is also married to Peter Parker's Aunt May.

== Joan Jameson ==
Joan Jameson is a character appearing in American comic books published by Marvel Comics. She is the wife of J. Jonah Jameson in Marvel Comics. The character, created by Zeb Wells and Dean Haspiel, first appeared in The Amazing Spider-Man #190 (March 1979).

Joan was a high school classmate of Jameson and part of the school paper along with Steve "Tripod". While being accosted by some bullies, Jameson furiously tore into them scaring his tormentors and earning a reputation. This easily impressed Joan who fell in love with him. Joan spent some time with Jameson at his home after the school dance and met his step-father, David Burnoll, who was a raging alcoholic. Unintimidated by his behavior, Jameson took David's cigar and smoked one for the first time. He threw up afterwards and Joan admitted that his father was a jerk, something which Jameson said was "the most romantic thing [he] had ever heard". While Jameson was away in Korea for the Daily Bugle, Joan was killed by a masked mugger. This resulted in Jameson's ongoing anger issues as well as his hatred for masked individuals like Spider-Man.

=== Joan Jameson in other media ===
- Joan Jameson appears in Spider-Man 2, portrayed by Christine Estabrook.
- Joan Jameson appears in The Spectacular Spider-Man episode "Gangland", voiced by Jane Lynch.

== Abigail Jarvis ==
Abigail Jarvis is Edwin Jarvis's mother.

=== Alternate versions of Abigail Jarvis ===
The Ultimate Marvel version of "Mrs. Jarvis" is Gregory Stark's assistant.

=== Abigail Jarvis in other media ===
Ana Jarvis appears in Agent Carter, portrayed by Lotte Verbeek. This version is Edwin Jarvis' wife.

== Jarvis ==
Jarvis was created by Brian Michael Bendis and David Finch and first appeared in The New Avengers #3 (February 2005). He is an unnamed Skrull who impersonated Edwin Jarvis during the "Secret Invasion" storyline. After Veranke's defeat, Jarvis captures Danielle Cage and escapes. In the subsequent storyline "Dark Reign", Luke Cage enlists Norman Osborn's help to find Jarvis. Jarvis agrees to give up Danielle, but is killed by Bullseye.

== Jerry Jaxon ==
Jerome Jaxon was originally an executive vice president in charge of research and development for the Am-Can Petroleum Company. One of his subordinates at Am-Can, James Hudson, developed a powered exoskeleton designed for excavation, which Jaxon sought to weaponize for military purposes. Hudson refused; with the support of Jaxon's secretary Heather MacNeil, Hudson destroyed the plans and stole the prototype armor. Hudson revamped the armor into a battlesuit which he later used as leader of Alpha Flight, under the codename Guardian. Hudson's theft cripples Jaxon's career, leading him to be dismissed from Am-Can and his wife to leave him. Destitute, Jaxon attempts to commit suicide, leading him paraplegic.

Jaxon becomes the executive vice president of Roxxon, the parent company of Am-Can. Paired with Delphine Courtney, a robot disguised as a human woman, Jaxon plots revenge against Hudson by having Courtney recruit superhuman castoffs from the discontinued Department H program, forming Omega Flight. Jaxon takes control of the Box robot from Roger Bochs, as he wants to kill Guardian personally. Hudson uses his suit to overload the Box robot; the feedback to the control helmet kills Jaxon.

== Jazinda ==
Jazinda is a character appearing in Marvel Comics. She is the estranged daughter of Kl'rt, the Super-Skrull. Exiled from the Skrull empire under threat of death as a traitor, she currently resides and works on Earth as part of a freelance bounty hunting team, with She-Hulk. She is a member of the Lady Liberators.

== Abner Jenkins ==
Abner Jenkins, also known as Beetle, MACH-1, MACH-2, MACH-3, MACH-IV, MACH-V, MACH-VII and MACH-X, is a character appearing in American comic books published by Marvel Comics. Created by writer Stan Lee and artist Carl Burgos, he debuted in Strange Tales #123 (August 1964) as the original Beetle, a supervillain wielding winged armor who became frustrated with his ordinary job as an aircraft mechanic and deciding to turn to crime. Although in his first appearance he fought the Human Torch and the Thing of the Fantastic Four, later storylines established Jenkins as a recurring foe of Spider-Man, usually working as a henchman for various criminal organizations opposing the hero. Jenkins later formed his own criminal organization known as the Sinister Syndicate.

After abandoning his Beetle persona, Jenkins was recruited into the Thunderbolts—a supervillain team assembled by Helmut Zemo to pose as superheroes to gain access to the technology of the Fantastic Four and the Avengers, groups which had both seemingly died while fighting Onslaught. Jenkins became known as "MACH-1", using a modified version of his Beetle armor that was designed for faster flight and higher altitude. The Thunderbolts were introduced in Incredible Hulk #449 (January 1997), and although they originally went along with Zemo's plan, later storylines depicted them as disobeying him due to enjoying the attention and adulation they received as heroes. Seeking redemption, Jenkins was convinced to give himself over to authorities to serve out an outstanding prison sentence in exchange for the Thunderbolts being granted immunity. During his time in jail, Jenkins helped the authorities out, which led to him working for the government after his release from prison. He later began working at the Raft prison as head of security and re-joined the Thunderbolts, now a team of reformed criminals trying to earn time off their sentence by working for the government. In the storyline Secret Empire, Jenkins is killed when Zemo attacks the Thunderbolts.

=== Abner Jenkins in other media ===
==== Television ====
- Abner Jenkins as Beetle appears in the Spider-Man and His Amazing Friends episode "Origin of the Spider-Friends", voiced by Christopher Collins.
- Abner Jenkins as Beetle appears in the Iron Man episode "The Armor Wars", voiced by John Reilly.
- Abner Jenkins as Beetle makes a non-speaking cameo appearance in the Ultimate Spider-Man episode "Beetle Mania".
- Abner Jenkins as Beetle and MACH-IV appears in Avengers Assemble, voiced by Mark Hanson.
- Abner Jenkins as Beetle appears in Spider-Man (2017), voiced by Fred Tatasciore.

==== Video games ====
- Abner Jenkins as Beetle appears in Spider-Man (1995).
- Abner Jenkins as Beetle appears as a boss in Spider-Man: Lethal Foes.
- Abner Jenkins as Beetle appears as a non-player character (NPC) in Spider-Man 2: Enter Electro, voiced by Daran Norris.
- Abner Jenkins as MACH-V appears in Lego Marvel's Avengers via the "Thunderbolts" DLC pack.
- Abner Jenkins as Beetle appears as a boss in Marvel Cosmic Invasion, voiced by Josh Keaton.

==== Miscellaneous ====
The Old Man Logan incarnation of Abner Jenkins appears in the Marvel's Wastelanders: Hawkeye episode "Cards Up", voiced by Ron Canada.

==== Merchandise ====
- Abner Jenkins as Beetle received an action figure in the Spider-Man (1994) tie-in toyline.
- Abner Jenkins as MACH-I received a figure in Hasbro's Marvel Legends line.

== Jentorra ==
Jentorra is a character appearing in comic books related to Marvel Comics. She was created by Scott Reid and Miguel Munera, and first appeared in Realm of the Kings: Son of Hulk #1 (February 2010).

Jentorra is a native of the planet K'ai in the Microverse and the niece of its late princess Jarella. After Psyklop attacks K'ai, Jentorra attempts to summon the Hulk, but unintentionally summons his son, Hiro-Kala, who removes K'ai from the Microverse. Jentorra joins the Enigma Force to stop Hiro-Kala.

=== Jentorra in other media ===
Jentorra appears in Ant-Man and the Wasp: Quantumania, portrayed by Katy O'Brian. This version is the leader of a rebellion against Kang the Conqueror in the Quantum Realm.

== Jetstream ==
Jetstream

Publication information
- Publisher: Marvel Comics
- First appearance: The New Mutants #16 (June 1984)
- Created by: Chris Claremont (writer); Sal Buscema (artist)

In-story information
- Alter ego: Haroun ibn Sallah al-Rashid
- Species: Human Mutant
- Team affiliations: Hellions
- Abilities: Concentrates thermo-kinetic energy beneath his feet to aid him in jet-like propulsion; also has various technological components surgically inserted into his legs and back which help to focus his abilities and direct his flight path

Jetstream (Haroun ibn Sallah al-Rashid) is a Moroccan mutant character appearing in American comic books published by Marvel Comics. Created as a part of the group known as the Hellions, he exists in Marvel's main shared universe, known as the Marvel Universe. His first appearance was in The New Mutants #16.

Haroun ibn Sallah al-Rashid was born in the Rif Mountains in Morocco. As Jetstream, he was a student and operative of the White Queen and member of the original group of Hellions, the trainee group of mutants set up by the Hellfire Club to be a rival to the New Mutants. Haroun felt obligated to be part of the group; they gave him cybernetics to stop his powers from causing self-injury.

Jetstream and most of the Hellions were killed in an attack by Trevor Fitzroy, who uses them to fuel his powers. Jetstream resurfaces during the Krakoan Age, having presumably been resurrected by the Five.

=== Powers and abilities of Jetstream ===
Jetstream is a mutant who can release thermo-chemical energy from his body, rapidly propelling him through the air. He can also release energy from all of his limbs, thus traveling close to the speed of sound. Jetstream's body is resistant to his energy, but is not completely immune. To enable him to use his power, the Hellfire Club provided Jetstream with a Frost Industries bionic system. Among these systems was a foldable backpack which contained computerized scanning devices and aerial navigation, and rockets in his thighs to help contain, focus, and control his power. Jetstream is a fair hand-to-hand combatant, having been trained at the Massachusetts Academy.

== Jiang Li ==
Jiang Li

Publication information
- Publisher: Marvel Comics
- First appearance: Shang-Chi (vol. 2) #4 (September 2021)
- Created by: Gene Luen Yang; Dike Ruan

In-story information
- Species: Human
- Place of origin: Ta-Lo
- Team affiliations: Qilin Riders
- Abilities: Master archer; psionically link with qilin

Jiang Li is the hero Shang-Chi's mother who debuted in Shang-Chi (vol. 2) #4 (September 2021). The character was created by Gene Luen Yang and Dike Ruan, and is based on the Marvel Cinematic Universe (MCU) character Ying Li, portrayed by Fala Chen in the film Shang-Chi and the Legend of the Ten Rings (2021). As a Qilin Rider, Jiang Li is blessed by the Xian with the power of innate archery and to psionically link with qilin. Jiang Li can also extend her psionic abilities to other individuals, including humans and aliens. She is also proficient in martial arts.

In the early 1970s, writer Steve Englehart and artist Jim Starlin developed the character Shang-Chi, a master of kung fu and a previously unknown son of Dr. Fu Manchu. Shang-Chi's mother was a white American woman, per mandate by then editor-in-chief Roy Thomas. She was selected by Fu Manchu to be the mother of his progeny for her genetics.

The name Jiang Li was originally used for Shang-Chi's mother in Shang-Chi and the Legend of the Ten Rings, in which she is depicted as an Asian woman, although the name for the film character was ultimately changed to Ying Li. Following the film's release, Shang-Chi comic writer Gene Luen Yang incorporated several concepts introduced in the film into the Shang-Chi mythos, including the character Jiang Li as Shang-Chi's real mother, who was based on Shang-Chi's mother Ying Li, (Note: The character's name in the film was initially announced as Jiang Li, even used on licensed products, however, it was changed to Ying Li.) retconning Shang-Chi's white American mother and his mixed-race heritage; the heavenly realm Ta-Lo, which was previously introduced by writers Mark Gruenwald, Ralph Macchio and artist Keith Pollard in Thor #310 (1980); and the Ten Rings weapons. Refinery29 reviewer Leah Marilla Thomas praised the newer incarnation of the character for the "mythical (and devastatingly romantic) backstory", which makes her a "real character" as compared to the brief appearances in earlier comics.

=== Fictional character biography ===
Jiang Li was born into one of Ta-Lo's few communities of mortals known as the Qilin Riders who were appointed by the Xian as guardians of the gateway connecting Ta-Lo to Qilin Island in the East China Sea. While on patrol, Jiang Li rescued a shipwrecked Zheng Zu from pirates. Jiang Li nursed Zu back to health and the two fell in love. However, Jiang Li's father, Chieftain Xin, was outraged over her harboring an outsider and ordered her to return to Ta-Lo with Zu's head. Instead, Jiang Li and Zu fled to Zu's House of the Deadly Hand in Hunan, where Jiang Li discovered Zu's true identity as the leader of the Five Weapons Society, a criminal organization. Jiang Li attempted to leave him, but Zu pleaded with her to stay, promising to change his dark ways. True to his word, Zu rediscovered his own humanity from Jiang Li and the two married and had two children: Shang-Chi and Shi-Hua. However following an attack by Hydra against the House of the Deadly Hand, Zu became cold and distant towards his family, as he felt that his love for them made him weak. Out of loneliness, Jiang Li sent a letter to her father and a few weeks later was drawn to a confrontation between Xin and Zu in the latter's personal tower, where it was revealed that Zu had constructed a makeshift portal to Ta-Lo to steal the realm's sacred weapons to bolster the Society. While Zu fought his wife and father-in-law, Shang-Chi happened upon the scene, just as the portal's connection to Ta-Lo became disconnected and Jiang Li was accidentally pushed through to her presumed death.

Instead, Jiang Li was sent to the Negative Zone, where she used her psionic abilities to mentally link with the native mantid creatures, who protected and sheltered her. Jiang Li resided in the Negative Zone for many years, occasionally using her psionic abilities to reach out to her children. After Shang-Chi took over the Five Weapons Society following Zu's death and began reforming it as a heroic organization, he began receiving Jiang Li's messages through his dreams and travelled to the Negative Zone with his half-siblings to rescue her. While she recuperated at the New House of the Deadly Hand in Chinatown, Manhattan, she is secretly visited by her father. Despite claiming to being overjoyed to see her again, Xin is consumed by his rage towards Zu and his bloodline since his earlier confrontation with them and believes Shang-Chi to be as evil as his father, vowing to put an end to his grandson.

Due to being mentally linked to insects for many years, Jiang Li takes a while to recover her mental health but spends time with her son and his half-siblings. After she fully recovers, Jiang Li begins telling Shang-Chi their family history but the two are attacked by several enemies of the Society. Jiang Li uses her psionic abelites to realize that they are being led by Xin. Although Shang-Chi and the Society are able to defeat the would-be assassins, Jiang Li is taken hostage by them, forcing Shang-Chi to let them escape. Although Xin is outraged over their failure to kill Shang-Chi and for kidnapping his daughter, he allows his allies to escape with Jiang Li through a portal to Qilin Island and through the gateway to Ta-Lo. After failing to acquire Shang-Chi's corpse to complete his magic, Xin forcibly extracts Jiang Li's psionic energy to locate Shi-Hua for his ritual. Xin returns with Shi-Hua's severed right hand, which he uses to create taotie masks for himself and the Qilin Riders. Jiang Li escapes by psionically bonding with a nearby qilin and travels back to Earth to help the Society defend the House of the Deadly Hand from the mask empowered Riders. Jiang Li briefly faces off against her father, who is empowered by his own mask and several of the heavenly Ten Rings but helped by the arrival of Shang-Chi and his siblings. When Shang-Chi succumbs to his inner darkness to take the Ten Rings from Xin and defeats him and the Riders, he attempts to sever Xin's hand in retaliation for what he did to Shi-Hua but Jiang Li and his siblings talk him down, bringing him back to his senses. Jiang Li and Shang-Chi return to Ta-Lo for Xin to face justice and to return the Ten Rings to the Jade Emperor, who appoints Jiang Li as the new Chieftain of the Qilin Riders, which requires her to remain in Ta-Lo.

== Jimmy-6 ==
Jimmy-6

Publication information
- Publisher: Marvel Comics
- First appearance: Spider-Man #70 (May 1996)
- Created by: Howard Mackie (writer); John Romita Jr. (artist)

In-story information
- Alter ego: Giacomo "James" Fortunato
- Team affiliations: U.S. Army
- Abilities: Peak human strength.; Highly skilled hand-to-hand combatant, firearms user and helicopter pilot.

Giachomo "Jimmy-6" Fortunato is a character appearing in American comic books published by Marvel Comics. The character is featured in the Marvel Universe and is commonly associated with Spider-Man. He first appeared in Spider-Man #70 and was created by writer Howard Mackie and artist John Romita Jr.

When the Kingpin (Wilson Fisk) lost control of New York's underworld, crime lord Don Fortunato filled the power void. His son, Giachomo Fortunato, disapproved of his family's methods and tried to quit organized crime just as his father's plans were coming to fruition. Enraged, Don Fortunato demands his son's death. On the run, Jimmy-6 pushes Ben Reilly (a clone of Peter Parker) away from a barrage of bullets intended for him. As Spider-Man, Reilly returns the favor by rescuing Jimmy-6 from an assassination attempt. Although the wounded Jimmy-6 wants nothing to do with Spider-Man, he reluctantly accepts Reilly's offer to hide at his apartment.

Fortunato reveals he has kidnapped civilians from each of the territories of the attending crime lords. Jimmy-6 learns the civilians are to be executed as an example of what would happen in case of disobedience. Horrified, Jimmy pulls a gun on Fortunato, who disowns him. When the Kingpin returns to claim his criminal empire, Jimmy-6 challenges him and rejoins the Fortunato cartel, replacing his incapacitated father.

Composed almost entirely of muscle, Jimmy-6's massive frame grants him peak human strength and prevents most penetration wounds. He is a skilled strategist and electrical engineer, having designed the Fortunato estate's security systems. As a veteran of two tours of duty with the U.S. Army, he is an accomplished hand-to-hand combatant, firearms user, and helicopter pilot.

=== Jimmy-6 in other media ===
Jimmy-6 appears in Spider-Man: Turn Off the Dark, portrayed by Gideon Glick.

== Jitter ==
Jitter (Sofia Yong) is a character appearing in American comic books published by Marvel Comics.. Jitter first appeared in Uncanny X-Men (vol. 6) #1 (August 2024) and was created by Gail Simone and David Marquez.

A Singaporean mutant, Sofia Yong was harassed by her classmates for her powers. She traveled to the United States where she joined with the Outliers, a group of young mutants pursued by Hag. The group would go on to join Gambit's Louisiana team of X-Men as their students.

Jitter has the mutant ability to hyper-focus on any task for a minute, therefore gaining any necessary desired skill.

== Alana Jobson ==
Alana Jobson was the second character known as Jackpot in Marvel Comics. After Sara Ehret sold her the identity and went into hiding, Jobson started using a cocktail of enhancement drugs, including Mutant Growth Hormone to grant herself the powers of super-strength, stamina, and invulnerability associated with the Jackpot identity. In denial of her own sexuality, Jobson developed a crush on Spider-Man, whom she emulated. She later was revealed to be a lesbian who had unrevealed feelings for Ehret.

While fighting Commanda and Blindside, Jobson is pumped with the blindness serum used by Blindside to defeat his enemies. Spider-Man arrives and administers an antidote to Jobson, restoring her vision, but the serum's interaction with the drugs that gave her superhuman powers, results in a fatal side effect in Jobson, who dies shortly thereafter.

== Martha Johansson ==
Martha Johansson is a character appearing in American comic books published by Marvel Comics. The character was created by Grant Morrison and Ethan Van Sciver, and first appeared in New X-Men #118 (October 2011). She is a telepath, with the ability to communicate telepathically, astral project, negate powers and possess bodies.

Martha was a runaway who was captured by the U-Men and their founder Sublime had her brain removed from her body and preserved in a capsule while using her body for their own means. Sublime controls Martha through drugs and used her to telepathically subdue the two X-Men Cyclops and Emma Frost. Frost frees herself and Cyclops from Martha's psionic control, inadvertently allowing Martha to take revenge on Sublime. Quentin Quire invents a special hovering case to hold her brain, allowing a level of mobility for Martha as No-Girl.

During the Krakoan Age, Martha assists the X-Men in battling the Shadow King in the astral plane. She projects an astral body, which resembles her idealized self and has a transparent head that leaves her brain visible. After returning to Earth, Martha arranges for her brain to be transferred into a husk body identical to her astral body and takes on the name Cerebella.

=== Martha Johansson in other media ===
Martha Johansson makes a non-speaking appearance in the X-Men '97 episode "Danger.exe".

== Otis and Adina Johnson ==
Otis Johnson and Adina Johnson are the parents of Tyrone Johnson (the superhero known as Cloak) in Marvel Comics. The characters, created by Bill Mantlo and Rick Leonardi, made their sole appearance in Cloak and Dagger #4 (January 1984).

While their names have never been revealed in the comics, for the convenience of this section they will be referred to by their names in the TV series with their son renamed Otis Jr. Michael and Adina had four children, Tyrone, Otis Jr., Anna and an unnamed daughter. The Johnsons met with Tyrone's teacher when they discovered that despite Tyrone being a gifted basketball player, he had a stutter which worried the Johnsons. Beyond that not much is known about them, but it is assumed that they have been in grief due to Tyrone having run away which may have further affected them by the death of their daughter and imprisonment of Otis Johnson Jr.

=== The Johnsons in other media ===
Otis and Adina appear in Cloak & Dagger, portrayed by Miles Mussenden and Gloria Reuben respectively. These versions respectively work at an unspecified desk job and at Roxxon Gulf.

== Otis Johnson Jr. ==
Otis Johnson Jr. is the brother of Tyrone Johnson (the superhero known as Cloak) in Marvel Comics. The character, created by Bill Mantlo and June Brigman, made his sole appearance in Cloak and Dagger (vol. 2) #11 (March 1987).

Otis Jr. is the son of Otis Sr. and Adina Johnson. He is the younger brother of Tyrone and the older brother to Anna and an unnamed sister. Not much is known about him other than that he looked up to Tyrone, but after he ran away he and the family spiraled. Otis Jr. resorted to becoming a dope pusher and hooked his sister Anna who overdosed causing him to get arrested.

=== Otis Johnson Jr. in other media ===
A character based on Otis Johnson Jr named William "Billy" Johnson appears in Cloak & Dagger, portrayed by Marqus Clae. He was killed by Detective James Connors in the same incident where Tyrone gained his powers.

== Aikku Jokinen ==
Aikku Jokinen, also known as Pod and Enigma, is a superhero appearing in American comic books published by Marvel Comics. The character was created by writer Jonathan Hickman and artist Stefano Caselli, and first appeared in Avengers (vol. 5) #4 (March 2013).

Aikku was hiking and came across the armor of the being Ex Nihilo which proceeded to bond with Aikku, forming a cocoon that protected her. She was later found by the group Avengers Idea Mechanics where she finally hatched and flew to Australia to fight the Avengers only to be caught by A.I.M. again. The leader of A.I.M. turned out to be the superhero Sunspot who made Aikku (now going by the Pod name) a personal bodyguard and together joined the New Avengers. While being studied by Toni Ho, it is revealed that Aikku refuses to take the Pod armor off as it would effectively kill the Pod suit due to being a living sentient suit. The two are suddenly attacked by the New Revengers who fatally wound Pod. With no other choice, the Pod armor sacrificing itself and ejects Aikku, however Aikku is able to retain the undersuit from Pod. Afterwards, Ho helped Aikku get used to her new suit and the two admitted feelings to each other. Alongside Ho, Aikku (now taking the Enigma alias) joins the U.S.Avengers.

Aikku Jokinen's super-human suit that bonded to her allows flight, shield generation, invulnerability and the ability to adapt to its enemies attacks, and also includes a full arsenal such as laser beams and mines.

== Jolt ==
Jolt (Helen "Hallie" Takahama) is a superheroine appearing in American comic books published by Marvel Comics. Created by Kurt Busiek and Mark Bagley, the character has been depicted as a member of the Thunderbolts and Young Allies. She was a teenager when Onslaught attacked New York and killed her parents, leading her to be abducted by Arnim Zola and be subjected to experiments that gave her powers of heightened strength, speed and agility. After escaping, Helen went to Four Freedoms Plaza seeking the Fantastic Four, only to find the Thunderbolts were now living there. After they followed her into Zola's compound to rescue the other kidnapped children, she was accepted into the group, adopting the name Jolt. She died after being shot by Scourge, who had been coerced to eliminate all the Thunderbolts, and Techno took Jolt's body from the morgue hoping to investigate more on her biokinetic powers. His experiments, however, caused a regenerative effect that healed Jolt and brought her back to life. Jolt also got new powers, that allowed her to turn into pure biokinetic energy, enabling her to discharge energy blasts and fly.

=== Jolt in other media ===
Jolt appears in Lego Marvel's Avengers as part of the "Thunderbolts" DLC.

== Charlotte Jones ==
Charlotte Jones is a character in Marvel Comics, and a human ally of the X-Men. Created by Louise Simonson and Terry Shoemaker, she first appeared in X-Factor #51 (December 1989).

Jones was once a trauma nurse at a Brooklyn hospital. One night, a gang war caused the death of her police officer husband George and wounded her son Timmy. As a result of that night, Charlotte became a police officer herself.

Jones met Archangel while on the job, when he saved her from falling from a helicopter collision, and then again the next day from an ambush by a street gang. Jones and Archangel next were targeted by a group of psychic vampires known as the Ravens, but were freed and defeated them with the assistance of other mutant heroes. Jones and Archangel began to see each other socially, and the two fell in love.

Jones later clashed with Genoshan Magistrates who had come to the U.S. to reclaim escaped mutate Jennifer Ransome. During a firefight with the Magistrates, Jones' partner was killed. Following them into the sewers, she was saved by Forge, who provided her with an X-Men training costume.

Jones and Archangel would eventually end their relationship after Archangel rejoins the X-Men, but Jones still remained an ally. Later, after Jones had been promoted to Detective, she passes information to Cable about a troubled member of his X-Force team, Shatterstar.

== Alisa Jones ==
Alisa Jones is a character appearing in American comic books published by Marvel Comics.

The character was created by Brian Michael Bendis and Stuart Immonen, first appearing as a behind the scenes character in Alias #7 (March 2002), before making her full appearance in New Avengers #58 (October 2009), with her name being revealed in Jessica Jones (vol. 2) #10 (July 2017).

Alisa is the adoptive mother of Jessica Jones. She and her husband adopted her after a car accident killed her parents and brother, re-enrolling at Midtown High School. Alisa tried to maintain contact with her daughter upon Jessica growing up into an adult, but Jessica mostly ignored her calls.

Upon Jessica conceiving a child with her husband Luke Cage, and giving birth to a daughter, Danielle Cage, Alisa criticized Jessica because her granddaughter was born to and going to be raised by wanted criminals, and believed that their daughter should live a normal and safe life.

=== Alisa Jones in other media ===
Alisa Jones, hybridized with the unnamed Mrs. Campbell, appears in the television series Jessica Jones, portrayed by Miriam Shor in the first season and Janet McTeer in the second. This version, born Alisa Campbell, is Jessica Jones's biological mother, who also was experimented on by Karl Malus, a doctor at IGH, with him saving her life, giving her superhuman strength and powers while leaving her disfigured. Working for him and for IGH, her goal is to kill everyone who is threatening to expose IGH, making her come into conflict with her daughter. She is later killed by Trish Walker.

== Piranha Jones ==
Raymond "Piranha" Jones is a supervillain appearing in Marvel Comics, primarily as a foe of Luke Cage.

The character first appeared in Luke Cage, Power Man #30 (April 1976), created by writer Don McGregor and artists Rich Buckler, Arv Jones and Keith Pollard. Ray Jones grew up in poverty and lost all of his teeth by the age of 15, and had them replaced with long, sharpened steel spikes, for which he gained the nickname "Piranha". He became a criminal at an early age, and eventually allied with Dontrell "Cockroach" Hamilton.

=== Piranha Jones in other media ===
- Piranha Jones appears in The Avengers: Earth's Mightiest Heroes episode "To Steal an Ant Man". This version had his whole mandible replaced with a mechanical jaw and works for William Cross.
- Raymond "Piranha" Jones appeared in the second season of Luke Cage, portrayed by Chaz Lamar Shepherd. This version is the son of a prostitute employed by Harlem crime lord Maybelline "Mama Mabel" Stokes and childhood friend of Mariah Dillard who became a Wall Street broker and whose nickname is derived from his personal belief he is a "little fish [that] you don't see coming" in the cutthroat world of stock trading. While working with Dillard to help her transition from her criminal activities to insider trading, Bushmaster kidnaps Jones and forces him to bankrupt Dillard before executing him off-screen once he is done.

== Joseph ==
Joseph is a character appearing in American comic books published by Marvel Comics. Created by writer Scott Lobdell and artist Roger Cruz, he first appeared in The Uncanny X-Men #327 (December 1995). The original Joseph is a clone of the X-Men's nemesis Magneto, possessing his magnetic powers, though he was originally intended to be an amnesiac Magneto.

=== First Joseph ===
While Magneto was recuperating from Holocaust's attack on Avalon, his follower Astra secretly created an amnesiac clone of Magneto to kill him only to flee when Magneto avoids him. Joseph was discovered near a South American orphanage run by a nun known as Sister Maria. After several run-ins with "The Colonel", Joseph opted to leave the orphanage to protect the children. It was shortly after this that he encountered Rogue and saved her from the first wave of Bastion's "Operation Zero Tolerance". Rogue believed Joseph to be an amnesiac and mysteriously youthful Magneto. During this time, the X-Men first encountered the entity Onslaught. Believing Magneto to be responsible, the Avengers sought Joseph out and figured out that he was not responsible nor was he like Magneto. Out of guilt for what he believed were his past sins, Joseph joined the X-Men in their war against Onslaught.

When Magneto caused an electromagnetic pulse in Earth, Joseph sacrifices his life to stop Magneto's plot, which briefly depowered Magneto. After being resurrected by Astra, Joseph forms a version of the Brotherhood of Mutants alongside Astra and clones of Blob, Mastermind, Quicksilver, Scarlet Witch, and Toad.

=== 3K's Joseph ===
Astra creates another Joseph clone after she founds the organization 3K. Joseph refers to Astra as his mother and insists on being called Magneto.

== Josiah X ==
Josiah X is a character, the son of Isaiah Bradley, the black Captain America, and the uncle of Elijah Bradley, the Patriot. The character was created by Christopher Priest and Joe Bennett, and debuted in The Crew #1.

Josiah is a Nation of Islam minister. He replaced his last name Bradley with the letter "X". He has had many names including "Justice", the one he used as a hero. The "X" apparently symbolizes his allegiance to the Lost Tribe of Shabazz. Josiah runs a Nation of Islam Mission in the "Mog" (Little Mogadishu) in Brooklyn, New York.

As depicted in the series Truth: Red, White & Black, the World War II Super Soldier program of 1942 used African American test subjects in a beta phase. After a failed suicide mission to destroy the Super-Soldier efforts of the Nazis, Isaiah Bradley was court-martialed and imprisoned. While he was in prison, the government attempted to use his altered DNA to create another Super-Soldier. After 39 attempts they had a single success, which was Josiah. His surrogate mother smuggled him out from the government's watchful eye.

Josiah grew up alone in a Catholic orphanage outside of Boston. His powers revealed themselves when he lashed out at one of the orphanage nuns while in his early teens. Believing he had accidentally killed Sister Irenia, he fled. Under the assumed name of Josiah Smith, he entered the U.S. Army. After meeting his real parents, Josiah left the US and traveled abroad as a private military contractor and adventurer. It was in Africa that Josiah discovered the Islamic faith and decided to use it to find a purpose for his life.

Due to his unique genetic makeup, Josiah ages very slowly. Although he is well over fifty years old, he appears to be twenty-five. His genetic code was manipulated with great precision to compensate for the side effects of unrefined Super Soldier serum. Josiah is extremely strong (able to bench press over 1,100 pounds) and his body possesses phenomenal endurance. Because of his many years on the run from the U.S. government, Josiah has experience and training as both a soldier and mercenary. He also has decades of experience with a variety of martial arts styles, languages and weapons.

Josiah carries the scarred battle shield belonging to his father and predecessor Isaiah, similar to one used by Steve Rogers before receiving his vibranium-steel shield. It is an unpainted concave triangular metal shield with the Double V for Victory design. For protection he wears a loose chain mesh shirt over light padding. This mesh shirt is capable of blunting the impact of most small arms fire.

== Joystick ==
Joystick is a character created by Marvel Comics. She is the villainous alter ego of Janice Yanizeski. She debuted in The Amazing Scarlet Spider #2 (December 1995), designed by artist Mark Bagley.

Joystick is a participant of "The Great Game", a competition between costumed individuals sponsored by wealthy executives. When she is first introduced, she presents her "monitor" with the mask of fellow participant El Toro Negro. She is assigned a match in New York against Scarlet Spider. Joystick goes to the Daily Bugle looking for reporter Ken Ellis. She meets Phil Urich (without his costume). Scarlet Spider follows Ellis and is ambushed by Joystick. Urich (as Green Goblin) saves Ellis as Ben Reilly still fights the woman. Meanwhile, in Paris, El Toro Negro attacks Joystick's "monitor", seeking revenge against her.

Joystick attacks Ben Reilly when he invades a facility's installations. Soon after, when Ben stops an attempt on Jonah Jameson's life (courtesy of El Toro Negro), an all-out brawl happens between the three, Chance, and Cardiac. During a fierce melee battle, El Toro Negro unveils his role in the conspiracy to a beaten Joystick: he assumed the role of a rogue player in the game to divert attention to the hostile takeovers happening backstage. Joystick confesses that, despite the false pretenses of El Toro Negro's role, she still defeats him and takes his mask.

== Juice ==
Juice is the name of two characters appearing in American comic books published by Marvel Comics.

=== Hannah ===
Hannah (last name unknown) is an electrokinetic mutant and member of the Ghosts of Cyclops.

=== 3K version ===
Juice (real name unknown) is a former member of Orchis who was artificially given mutant abilities by 3K, gaining a liquid-based body. Juice goes on to join the 3K X-Men, training under Wyre.

== Jumbo Carnation ==
Jumbo Carnation is a character appearing in Marvel Comics, a mutant fashion guru who first appeared in New X-Men #134 (November 2002), created by writer Grant Morrison and artist Keron Grant.

Jumbo Carnation is a mutant fashion guru who possesses four arms and superhuman strength and durability. He was killed off shortly after his introduction, it is left unclear if the character died from a drug overdose or from a hate crime.

The character was later resurrected during the Krakoan Age where he is a designer for many Krakoan mutants and suggests the first Hellfire Gala.

== Justice ==
Justice is the name of several characters in Marvel Comics.

=== Justice Peace ===
Justice Peace is a cyborg agent of the Time Variance Authority.
