= The Crew (comics) =

Superhero comic book

- Cover to The Crew #6 (Dec. 2003), art by J. H. Williams III.

Publication information
- Publisher: Marvel Comics
- Schedule: Monthly
- Format: Ongoing series
- Publication date: July 2003 – January 2004; April 2017 – Nov. 2017
- No. of issues: (1st series) 7 (2nd series) 6
- Main characters: The Crew: Junta, Josiah X, Kasper Cole, War Machine; Black Panther and the Crew: Black Panther, Eden Fesi, Luke Cage, Misty Knight, Storm

Creative team
- Created by: Christopher Priest (writer); Joe Bennett (artist)
- Written by: Ta-Nehisi Coates
- Penciller: Butch Guice

The Crew, later Black Panther and the Crew, is a comic book series published by Marvel Comics featuring teams of superheroes primarily of African descent banding together in New York City to fight injustice.

The first series was published in 2003 and ran for seven issues. The series was written by Christopher Priest and illustrated by Joe Bennett. The second series, a revival known as Black Panther and the Crew, was published in 2017 and ran for six issues. It was written by Ta-Nehisi Coates and illustrated by Butch Guice.

== Publication history ==
=== 2003 series ===
According to writer Christopher Priest's pitch, The Crew was about four hardened heroes who had all lost their families and came together initially out of self-interest, but would soon discover their commonality of loss. The Crew consisted of orphans. These men were dedicated to their respective goals, but each had a hole in his center. The seven stories released prior to cancellation were introductory pieces. If the series had continued, it would have highlighted each man's personal evolution.

The first story arc, Big Trouble In Little Mogadishu, was focused on the origin of Josiah X, son of Isaiah Bradley from Truth: Red, White & Black. Writer Priest intended that Josiah would eventually lead the team.

=== 2017 series ===
After the success of his run on Black Panther, Coates launched the spin-off title Black Panther and the Crew, a revival of the 2003 series.

Coates originally wanted to use the same characters from the 2003 series, but found that a number of them weren't available. After selecting a new Crew, he ultimately added two female members — Misty Knight and Storm. Poet Yona Harvey also contributed to the series (as she did on another short-lived Black Panther spin-off, World of Wakanda). Black Panther and the Crew ran six issues before being canceled due to low sales.

== Plot ==
=== 2003 series ===
The Crew takes place in the No man's land between the streets of the fictional "Little Mogadishu" and those of the fictional exclusive gated community of "Princeton Walk" in Brooklyn, New York. Princeton Walk was developed by Grace & Tumbalt, a largely black-owned corporation, who cleaned up a section of Brooklyn and moved the criminal element and the poverty line residents out. Little Mogadishu is a side effect of the gentrification process so that displaced criminal and poverty elements are now concentrated in a war zone outside Princeton Walk's walls.

Jim Rhodes, formerly War Machine, comes to Little Mogadishu to look into the murder of his estranged sister. He delivers the men responsible for his sister's murder to the police, coming across the local Muslim preacher Josiah X along the way. However, this is not enough to satisfy Rhodey, and he sets his sights on the 66 Bridges leader, Triage. His covert, vigilante action and contact with Josiah puts him on Kasper Cole's radar, making Kasper suspicious of what a guy like Rhodey is doing in a place like the Mog. Rhodey hits Little Mogadishu like a force of nature, derailing the secret money train that delivered bribes in bulk to a large number of corrupt officials. This action draws in Junta, who wants to leverage his way back into the spy business. He finds himself drafted into Rhodey's plan along with Kasper Cole and eventually a reluctant Josiah X.

Together, the Crew blackmails a long list of corrupt officials to turn in evidence against 66 Bridges and Triage and then goes after Triage directly. As Triage is no lightweight, the situation gets messy and some of the Crew must decide between their self-interests and being heroes. For Josiah, the decision to do the right thing is simple and instant. Junta reluctantly turns Triage into the authorities, blowing his chance to use Triage to get back in with his former bosses. Kasper Cole keeps busy saving lives as the White Tiger, sacrificing his chance to get in on the big bust as Kasper Cole and further his police career.

The Crew apparently did not remain together after this event. Rhodey soon went back to being War Machine, and Josiah was said to have disappeared.

While many of the characters in The Crew were members of racial minorities, Priest chose not to center The Crew around race:

So I find myself having to say, more than what The Crew is, what The Crew is not. The Crew is not The Black Avengers. The Crew is not "A Ghetto Book". The Crew is not even remotely about race. Race is never even mentioned in The Crew. It is a complete non-issue.

— Christopher Priest

Nonetheless, critics have called Priest's The Crew, "The blackest superhero story that Marvel Comics ever published."

=== 2017 series ===
Black Panther and the Crew takes place in the context of All-New, All-Different Marvel. Following evidence of outside influences fueling dissent in Wakanda, T'Challa calls on Luke Cage, Misty Knight, Storm, and Eden Fesi. Luke Cage describes the group as "The Crew". The series is set in Harlem and the plot is set into motion by an episode of police brutality.

== Characters ==
=== Original Crew ===
- Junta — Daniel "Danny" Vincent, freelance intelligence agent and con man
- Justice — Josiah "Josiah X" Bradley, son of Isaiah Bradley, the black Captain America
- Kasper Cole — Kevin "Kasper" Cole, the White Tiger, is heir-in-waiting to the title of Black Panther
- War Machine — Jim Rhodes, former United States Marine and friend of Iron Man

=== Black Panther and the Crew ===
- Black Panther — T'Challa, King of Wakanda, member of The Avengers
- Eden Fesi — also known as Manifold; aboriginal Australian mutant with the ability to bend time and space, connecting one piece to another and allowing him to teleport
- Luke Cage — Hero for hire
- Misty Knight — former NYPD officer, now private investigator with bionic prosthetic arm
- Storm — Ororo Munroe, mutant and member of the X-Men

== See also ==
- Truth: Red, White & Black
