= Isaiah Bradley =

Marvel Comics superhero

- Isaiah Bradley on a promotional cover for Truth: Red, White & Black #1 (2003). Art by Joe Quesada.

Publication information
- Publisher: Marvel Comics
- First appearance: Truth: Red, White & Black #1 (Jan. 2003)
- Created by: Axel Alonso; Robert Morales; Kyle Baker

In-story information
- Alter ego: Isaiah Bradley
- Species: Human mutate
- Notable aliases: Captain America
- Abilities: Trained unarmed combatant Peak physical attributes Slowed aging Extraordinary immunity to disease Carries a convex triangular metal shield

Isaiah Bradley is one of the superheroes to hold the title of Captain America, appearing in American comic books published by Marvel Comics. The character is an early product of the United States' Super Soldier program (codenamed Project: Rebirth) during World War II.

Carl Lumbly portrays the character in the Marvel Cinematic Universe streaming television series The Falcon and the Winter Soldier (2021) and the film Captain America: Brave New World (2025).

== Publication history ==
The original concept for the character came from an offhand comment by Marvel Comics' publisher Bill Jemas. Editor Axel Alonso was taken by the idea "inherent of politics of wrapping a Black man in red, white, and blue" and "a larger story ... a metaphor of America itself"; he also immediately thought of the Tuskegee Study. He proceeded to pitch the idea to Robert Morales, who was brought in to write the story, created the supporting cast and the ending. Artist and writer Kyle Baker collaborated with Morales to illustrate the groundbreaking work. The idea of an African American Captain America made Morales laugh, but, once he heard the premise, he found it depressing. Morales originally envisioned the character as a scientist who experimented on himself, a reference to Silver Age scientist Bruce Banner; however, Marvel wanted a more explicit reference to the Tuskegee Syphilis Study. Morales was able to push through an ending in which Bradley suffered brain damage, a reference to Muhammad Ali that gave the character a tragic ending. Morales performed extensive research into the time period, which he balanced with editorial suggestions.

As depicted in the 2003 limited series Truth: Red, White & Black, the World War II Super Soldier program of 1942, operated by Reinstein (Dr. Wilfred Nagel, employing an alias previously used by Abraham Erskine), uses African American test subjects to re-create the Super Soldier Serum that had previously been used to turn Steve Rogers from a skinny, but patriotic, army reject into Captain America. The clandestine experimentation that empowers Isaiah is reminiscent of the Tuskegee Syphilis Study.

== Fictional character biography ==
Project: Rebirth begins as a collaboration between American, British, and German scientists led by Wilfred Nagel and Dr. Koch. When World War II begins, Koch takes over the German program and Nagel takes over the American program. Each attempts to recreate the super soldier serum which empowered Steve Rogers. Nagel's early attempts to refine the formula are tested on African-Americans. Three hundred of these soldiers are taken from Camp Cathcart and subjected to potentially fatal experiments at an undisclosed location, as seen in Truth: Red, White & Black. Only five subjects survive the original trials. In the name of secrecy, the camp's commander and hundreds of black soldiers at Camp Cathcart are executed, with their deaths being covered up as wartime casualties.

Due to field missions in Europe and internal strife, Bradley emerges the sole survivor of his test group. He steals a spare costume and a shield intended for Captain America before he engages in a suicide mission to destroy the Super Soldier efforts of the Nazis at the Schwarzebitte concentration camp. There, he is able to assassinate Koch, but is captured by German forces. Bradley is later rescued by German insurgents, only to be court-martialed and imprisoned at Leavenworth around 1943. In 1960, Bradley is pardoned by President Eisenhower and released.

=== Josiah X ===
While Isaiah is in prison, the government attempts to use his altered DNA to create another Super Soldier. After 39 attempts the result is a child named Josiah, Isaiah and Faith's genetic son. Josiah X, as he would later call himself, is born to a surrogate mother who smuggles him out of the government's clutches. The character was introduced in the short-lived comic book series The Crew, created by Christopher Priest and Joe Bennett and published in 2003.

Meanwhile, the long-term effects of the test serum severely damage Bradley's mind and body, similar in part to the effects of various steroids and Alzheimer's. In 2003, Steve Rogers learns the truth behind the Super Soldier program and attempts a reconciliation with the now-childlike Bradley.

=== Patriot ===
Isaiah is the grandfather of Elijah Bradley (aka Patriot of the Young Avengers). Elijah initially claims that his powers originated from a blood transfusion from Isaiah, whereby he gained the abilities of the super soldier serum. However, it is subsequently revealed that this is a lie, and Elijah really gains his powers artificially from the drug Mutant Growth Hormone. The Young Avengers convince him that he does not need superpowers to be a superhero and he becomes the head of the Young Avengers using his intelligence and natural athletic abilities. After Eli is critically injured in battle, he gets a blood transfusion from his grandfather, giving him similar powers.

== Powers and abilities ==
While Isaiah possesses no superhuman powers as such, the super soldier formula running through his veins means that, physically, he is the perfect human: all of his bodily functions have been enhanced to the peak of human efficiency, making his agility, dexterity, strength, speed, endurance, reaction time, coordination, and balance superior to those of an Olympic athlete. His body eliminates any excessive build-up of lactic acid and other fatigue poisons in his muscles, which grants him phenomenal endurance. He has an extraordinary immunity to disease, and his aging process is also slowed dramatically. Isaiah is trained in unarmed combat by the U.S. Army.

=== Equipment ===
Isaiah carries a convex triangular metal shield, useful for either defense or offense, which he decorated with the Double V campaign eagle crest, a symbol of a victory against the Axis as well as a victory against racial discrimination at home. For protection, he wears a loose chain mesh shirt over light padding; the shirt is capable of blunting the impact of most small arms fire.

== Other versions ==
In Captain America vol. 4 #28, the Bradley of an alternate Earth is Captain America and never marries. Later, he is elected President of the United States and serves two terms. He travels back in time, incidentally crossing to Earth-616, and brings the mainstream Captain America and Rebecca Quan forward into his own time to prevent his daughter Rebecca "Becky" Barnes from traveling to Earth-616.

== Captain America timeline ==
Clarifying the timeline for Isaiah Bradley and Steve Rogers—and who predates whom—Robert Morales states in his appendix to the Truth: Red, White & Black trade paperback collection (2004):

Truth was originally planned to be outside of the Marvel Universe's official continuity. The editorial decision to place it into continuity meant explaining Timely Comics' first publication of Joe Simon and Jack Kirby’s Captain America in 1940—a full year before Pearl Harbor and the true start of our story.

Truth co-creator Kyle Baker further clarified the respective timelines of Bradley and Rogers in an interview:

With Captain America, people get on my case for 'changing' Captain America. We got a lot of grief from the Captain America fans on that series until the fifth and sixth issues came out; when it turned out that we hadn't tinkered with the continuity. Before that, everybody was very upset, because our story started with Pearl Harbor, and everybody knows that the first issue of Captain America took place before Pearl. Somewhere in the middle of the series, it's revealed that Cap already existed, and we hadn't tinkered with the timeline, and suddenly, the book is okay.

== Reaction and analysis ==
Editor-in-chief Axel Alonso felt that critical reaction of some fans to the first image that Marvel released of the silhouette of an African American man in a Captain America costume was based on the prejudicial assumption that it tarnished Captain America's legacy. Alonso stated that by the time the entire series had been published, reaction was more positive, with "[o]ne high-profile reviewer even… admitting he'd unfairly pre-judged the series, that he now saw it was about building bridges between people, not burning them…."

Sharon Packer, in her 2010 book Superheroes and Superegos: Analyzing the Minds Behind the Masks, wrote that the events and characters of Truth: Red, White & Black convey important messages about race relations, conspiracy theories, and performance enhancement in sports.

== In other media ==
Isaiah Bradley appears in media set in the Marvel Cinematic Universe (MCU), portrayed by Carl Lumbly.

- First appearing in The Falcon and the Winter Soldier, this version is an aging, veteran super-soldier who was active in the Korean War and defeated the Winter Soldier, but was imprisoned for 30 years after his service and experimented on by the government and Hydra. All the while, his existence was kept secret. In the present, Bradley lives in Baltimore with his grandson Eli Bradley.
- Bradley appears in Captain America: Brave New World.

== Collected editions ==
Stories he has appeared in have been collected into graphic novels:

- Truth: Red, White & Black (collects Truth: Red, White & Black #1–7, by Robert Morales and Kyle Baker); published in 2004. Reprinted in 2009 as Captain America: Truth. A new trade paperback edition was released in 2022, retaining the Captain America: Truth title.
- Captain America: Homeland (collects Captain America vol. 4 #21–28, by Robert Morales, Chris Bachalo and Eddie Campbell); published in 2004.
