= Toni Ho =

Comic book superhero

- Toni Ho as depicted in Avengers #685 (March 2018). Art by Paco Medina (penciler), Juan Vlasco (inker), and Jesus Aburtov (colorist).

Publication information
- Publisher: Marvel Comics
- First appearance: New Avengers (vol. 4) #1 (December 2015); U.S.Avengers #1 (March 2017; as Iron Patriot)
- Created by: Al Ewing; Gerardo Sandoval

In-story information
- Team affiliations: U.S.Avengers; A.I.M. R.E.S.C.U.E. Daughters of Liberty
- Notable aliases: Iron Patriot; Rescue; Hekate-4
- Abilities: Via powered armored suit: Superhuman strength and durability; A cyberpathic link with a prior version of her powered armored suit; Supersonic flight; Energy blasts; Missiles; Regenerative life support (sometimes powered by solar power); Communications system via helmet

Dr. Toni Ho is a superhero appearing in American comic books published by Marvel Comics.

== Publication history ==
Toni Ho first appeared in New Avengers vol. 4 #1 (December 2015), and was created by writer Al Ewing and artist Gerardo Sandoval.

== Fictional character biography ==
Toni Ho is the daughter of Ho Yinsen, an engineer with three doctoral degrees who helped create Iron Man's armor.

Toni becomes a member of the Avengers Idea Mechanics after she is bought out by Roberto da Costa / Sunspot. She serves as Rescue who is part of a support team for the New Avengers. Toni also studies Aikku Jokinen, the sentient Pod suit's wearer. She took an interest in Aikku because of the Pod suit and also because she sympathizes with Aikku's personal reasons for not wanting to take Pod off. Toni falls in love with Aikku, who reciprocates her feelings. Consequently, when the two are attacked by the Maker, Toni defends Aikku and Pod—and when Pod ejects Aikku, Toni helps Aikku with the new under-suit Enigma.

Toni is a member of the U.S. Avengers as the Iron Patriot. After Sunspot leaves American Intelligence Mechanics, Toni succeeds, and allows the rogue A.I.M. cells to regain the terrorist acronym, since Toni has now had her organization rebranded as R.E.S.C.U.E.

Toni also uses her computer expertise to help Ironheart rescue Tony Stark, and appears as a member of the Daughters of Liberty while utilizing the alias of Hekate-4 to help Steve Rogers.

== Other versions ==
- An alternate version of the character, Antonia Yinsen, appears in the 2015 Secret Wars crossover event as someone in power in her father's place in Yinsen City.
- An alternate version of the character is shown having had a brief relationship with Rikki Barnes who had been reincarnated into her reality until they were both murdered by the Maker.

== In other media ==
=== Television ===
Toni Ho / Iron Patriot appears in the Avengers Assemble episode "Into the Future", voiced by Laura Bailey. This version is a resistance fighter from a future ruled by Kang the Conqueror.

=== Video games ===
Toni Ho / Rescue appears as a playable character in Marvel Puzzle Quest.
