= Robert Morales =

American comic book writer

- Born: February 3, 1958; New York City, U.S.
- Died: April 18, 2013 (aged 55); Brooklyn, New York
- Occupations: Comic book writer, journalist, and editor
- Writing career
- Notable works: Truth: Red, White, and Black; Captain America

Robert Morales (February 3, 1958 – April 18, 2013) was an American comic book writer, editor, and journalist known for creating Truth: Red, White & Black, which featured his original character Isaiah Bradley. In addition to creating comics for Marvel Comics, Morales was an editor at Vibe Magazine and Reflex magazine throughout the 1990s and 2000s.

== Life and career ==
Robert Morales was born in New York City on February 3, 1958. He was of Afro-Puerto Rican descent.

=== Journalism and editorial career ===
Morales wrote short review pieces for the Dossier section of Heavy Metal magazine in the period 1982 to 1985.

He was the executive editor of Reflex magazine in the early 1990s, where he brought author Neil Gaiman onto the editorial team as consulting editor.

He was senior editor for the music and entertainment magazine Vibe from 1994 to 2007. He was the editor and literary executor for science fiction author Samuel R. Delany, and assisted in the publication of Delany's graphic novel Bread & Wine: An Erotic Tale of New York. Delany reflected that Morales had originally introduced him to author Kathy Acker, with whom he later collaborated.

Over the course of his career as a journalist, Morales wrote for publications such as Publishers Weekly.

=== Comics ===
Morales was also a comic book writer, known mostly for his work on the Marvel Comics series Captain America. While working on Captain America, Morales was known for writing story-arcs which tackled ongoing political issues and topics.

Morales pitched the idea for a black Captain America at a meeting with Joe Quesada, Marvel's editor-in-chief. Morales later reflected that he was surprised that he was given the assignment, commenting that "I wrote a proposal that was so staggeringly depressing I was certain they’d turn it down. But they didn’t". The concept was developed into the hero Isaiah Bradley in the series Truth: Red, White & Black. Morales co-created the series with illustrator Kyle Baker, with whom he had previously worked on satirical cartoons for Vibe Magazine. Truth reimagined the origins of Captain America, by following the stories of four African-American soldiers used involuntarily as test subjects by the US government to develop Steve Rogers' super serum. The series explicitly linked the Captain American mythos with the real world history of unethical human experimentation in the United States, white supremacy and eugenics. Much of the series was informed by Morales' studies of African-American history at the Schomburg Center for Research in Black Culture.

The series faced Internet backlash ahead of its release from fans who worried that it would tarnish the legacy of fictional character Steve Rogers. Many critics, however, later recanted their criticism after the series was published. Morales rejected criticism that he made Captain America a party to racism, stating that "It's a book where every single person is complicit, one way or another".

The trade paperback version of Truth contained an afterword by Morales in which he clarified that myth, history and imagination, and provides sources for his story.

After writing Truth, Morales was brought on to write the main Captain America series, after the departure of Dave Gibbons. Morales wrote Captain America volume 4, issues #21–28 in 2004. In an attempt to humanize Steve Rogers, Morales' managed to split fans' opinions fairly resoundingly, with Morales eventually leaving the title ten issues short of his intended contract for the series.

== Death ==
Morales died in his home in Brooklyn on April 18, 2013.

== Selected bibliography ==
- Truth: Red, White & Black #1–7 (Jan.–July 2003)
- Captain America #21–28 (Feb. 2004–Aug. 2004)
