= Edgar T. Rouzeau =

American journalist (1905-1958)

Edgar T. Rouzeau (1904 or 1905 – August 9, 1958) was an American journalist and war correspondent. He worked for papers including the New York Herald Tribune and Pittsburgh Courier.

He wrote about the Double V campaign, Tuskegee Airmen, and Eusebia Cosme. In November 1938 he wrote about Kristallnacht. During World War II, he became the first African American accredited as a war correspondent. He covered African American members of the military in the war.
