= U.S.Avengers =

American comic book series

- Cover of U.S.Avengers #1 (January 2017). Art by Paco Medina, Juan Vlasco, and Jesús Aburtov.

Publication information
- Publisher: Marvel Comics
- Schedule: Monthly
- Format: Ongoing series
- Publication date: January 4, 2017– June 2018
- Main character(s): Citizen V Red Hulk; Squirrel Girl; Cannonball; Iron Patriot; Enigma

Creative team as of January 2017
- Created by: Al Ewing; Paco Medina
- Written by: Al Ewing
- Penciller: Paco Medina
- Inker: Juan Vlasco
- Colorist: Jesús Aburtov

U.S.Avengers is an American comic book series published by Marvel Comics as a part of the Marvel NOW! 2.0 comic book branding. Created by writer Al Ewing and artist Paco Medina, the series debuted in January 2017. It features a traditionally American patriotic-themed team of Avengers.

== Publication history ==
The first issue of U.S.Avengers was released on January 4, 2017. The second issue was released on January 18. The third issue was released on February 15. The fourth issue was released on March 15. The fifth issue was released on April 19. The sixth issue was released on May 17. The seventh issue was released on June 21.

== Roster ==
The U.S.Avengers team consists of Roberto "Bobby" Da Costa / Citizen V, Robert Maverick / Red Hulk, Doreen Green / Squirrel Girl, Samuel "Sam" Guthrie / Cannonball, Aikku Jokinen / Enigma and Toni Ho / Iron Patriot.

== Fictional team history ==
When Advanced Idea Mechanics merged with the U.S. military to form American Intelligence Mechanics, Sunspot, under the alias of Citizen V, formed the U.S.Avengers with Cannonball, Pod (under the alias of Enigma), Squirrel Girl, and Toni Ho / Iron Patriot as well as Robert Maverick, the second Red Hulk. Their first mission puts them against the Secret Empire, who plot to destroy the United States. Red Hulk crash-lands into the Secret Empire's floating volcanic island base, hard enough to destroy it. The Avengers are later approached by a future version of Danielle Cage as Captain America, who tells them that her nemesis, the Golden Skull, came to their timeline to steal all the wealth. In Miami, the team crash a charity gala, only to discover that the CEOs in attendance were kidnapped and replaced by robots. During the battle, the team manages to defeat and capture the Golden Skull. Danielle returns to her timeline with the Golden Skull as her prisoner.

Cannonball returns to Earth only to discover the Alpha Flight Space Program, the Guardians of the Galaxy, and the Ultimates' battle against the Chitauri. He joins the heroes in battle until one of the Chitauri dragons eats Quasar and explodes, leaving both him and Quasar to be presumed dead. When Roberto assembles the team, he is attacked by one of his scientists, who has allied with Hydra. Meanwhile, the team arrives in Washington D.C. to confront Hydra when Red Hulk begins to attack them due to being affected by mind-controlling nanomachines. When Pod and Squirrel Girl end up in Paris and are attacked by Hydra agents, they are saved by the Champions of Europe. Meanwhile, Cannonball is found by an alien, among the debris from the Chitauri battle, where it is revealed that he is still alive. Red Hulk and Iron Patriot are captured and imprisoned when they see a nearly dead Roberto in one of the cells. While adjusting to prison life, Toni manages to heal Roberto just in time, when Hydra soldiers show up at their cell. At the prison, Roberto defeats the guards and frees Red Hulk from the nanites controlling him, while Squirrel Girl, Enigma, and the Champions of Europe defeat the Hydra soldiers. In the aftermath of the event, Roberto resigns from A.I.M. and is visited by Smasher, who tells him that Cannonball is still alive.

Cannonball is brought to the planet Kral X and introduced to its inhabitants. After discovering the people's troublesome behavior, Cannonball tries to escape, but is defeated and captured. Awakening in a dungeon, Cannonball meets other prisoners including a teen named Bugface. In the dungeon, Bugface explains to Cannonball that they are Skrulls and that Kral X is a planet designed for those who are not fit to serve in the Skrull army. To make them happy, Kral X was designed to look like a 1950s American TV show, but when the show was cancelled and rebooted in modern times, the Skrull Ritchie neglected Bugface's suggestion to move with the times and sent him and other like-minded citizens to the dungeon to keep their lifestyles the way it is. After escaping the dungeon, Cannonball leads Bugface and the rebels against Ritchie until Smasher and the U.S.Avengers arrive to help. After sending Ritchie and his cohorts to jail, the U.S.Avengers head back home.

== Literary reception ==
=== Sales ===
According to Marvel Comics, Captain Britain's United Kingdom variant cover of U.S.Avengers #1 was the most pre-ordered variant cover out of 50.

According to Diamond Comic Distributors, U.S.Avengers #1 was the best selling comic book in January 2017. U.S.Avengers #2 was the 94th best selling comic book in January 2017. U.S.Avengers #3 was the 111th best selling comic book in January 2017. U.S.Avengers #4 was the 138th best selling comic book in March 2017.

=== Issue 1 ===
Jesse Schedeen of IGN gave U.S.Avengers #1 a grade of 8.2 out of 10, writing, "U.S.Avengers #1 doesn't break a lot of new ground when it comes to establishing a superhero team. But if the plot here is straightforward, the book still stands out thanks to a combination of lovable patriotic excess and its celebration of American ideals. Fans of Ewing and Medina's previous New Avengers comic should feel right at home despite the new status quo." Graeme McMillan of Wired included U.S.Avengers #1 in their "5 Comics You Absolutely Must Read This Month" list.

== Collected editions ==
Title	Material collected	Published date	ISBN
U.S.Avengers Vol. 1: American Intelligence Mechanics	U.S.Avengers #1–6	August 1, 2017	978-1302906412
U.S.Avengers Vol. 2: Cannonball Run	U.S.Avengers #7–12	February 13, 2018	978-1302906429
