= List of Marvel Comics characters: I =

== Icarus ==
Icarus (Joshua "Jay" Guthrie) is a mutant superhero. First appearing in Rom Annual #3 (September, 1984), the character was created by Bill Mantlo and William Johnson. Joshua was introduced as the son of Thomas and Lucinda Guthrie, and younger brother of Sam (Cannonball) and Paige (Husk).

When Jay's mutation develops, he hides it from his family. During a conflict with the Cabot family, Jay is briefly killed, causing his young lover Julia Cabot to kill herself. Jay's mutant abilities revive him shortly after. Jay joins the student body at the Xavier Institute, initially joining the Hellions before transferring to the New Mutants.

Jay is tricked by William Stryker into giving up his wings, having them cut off in exchange for his friends' safety. As a result, Jay loses his healing factor, which was tied to his wings. Stryker betrays him by planting and activating a bomb, killing many students. Stryker then shoots Jay, mortally wounding him. Ms. Marvel and Iron Man find Jay dead in Stryker's church.

Icarus is among the mutants who are resurrected by the Five following the foundation of Krakoa as a mutant nation.

=== Powers and abilities of Icarus ===
Icarus is believed to be descended from the Cheyarafim, an ancient subtype of mutants who resemble angels. He possesses red feathered, angel-like wings which allow flight and produce regenerative enzymes allowing him to recover from normally fatal injuries. He is capable of producing sonic frequency beyond the range of human capability as well as creating multiple sounds at once.

== Icemaster ==
The Icemaster (Bradley Kroon) is a supervillain created for one of a series of Hostess advertisements; his advertisement debuted in December 1979. He later entered the mainstream comics continuity as a member of a new incarnation of the Masters of Evil, where he was adapted by Kurt Busiek and Mark Bagley.

Although how he gained his powers and abilities is unknown, Bradley Kroon had plans to create the next ice age as the Icemaster. He had frozen much of New York until he encountered the Human Torch. The Human Torch defeats Icemaster by throwing Hostess Fruit Pies to him, inducing his surrender.

Icemaster later appears as a member of Crimson Cowl's Masters of Evil. Icemaster is defeated when Hawkeye tricks Scorcher into accidentally blasting him. Before that, Icemaster accidentally hits Man-Killer, one of his own teammates, with an ice blast.

== Idyll ==
Idyll is the name of two characters in Marvel Comics.

=== High Mutant Prophet Idyll ===
High Mutant Prophet Idyll was an Arakkii Omega-level mutant with powers of precognition and a member of the Great Ring of Arakko. He went blind after foreseeing Arakko's defeat at the hands of Annihilation. At some point, Idyll died of unknown causes.

=== Idyll the Future Seer ===
Idyll the Future Seer was an Arakkii Omega-level mutant and the daughter of High Mutant Prophet Idyll who shared her father's precognitive abilities and succeeded him on the Great Ring of Arakko. When Uranos attacks Arakko, Isca the Unbeaten, compelled by her powers, defects to the Eternals and kills Idyll.

== Iguana ==
Iguana is a character appearing in American comic books published by Marvel Comics. He first appeared in Spectacular Spider-Man #32 (July 1979), and was created by Bill Mantlo and Jim Mooney.

An accident that occurred while Dr. Curt Connors was experimenting with a bio-enervator machine upon an ordinary iguana endowed the iguana with part of Connors' life force and memories, as well as the personality and powers of Connors' alter-ego, the Lizard. Iguana became a humanoid reptile with superhuman strength, hypnotic powers, and the ability to mentally control other reptiles. Iguana hypnotized Connors to make him forget what happened. The Iguana would stalk the night, but returned to its normal form during the day and stayed in its cage.

In the storyline "Hunted", Iguana is abducted for Kraven the Hunter's "Great Hunt". He is killed by one of Arcade's Hunter-Bots during a test run of the robot.

=== Iguana in other media ===
Iguana appears in The Amazing Spider-Man.

== Ikthalon ==
Ikthalon is a demon who has clashed with Daimon Hellstrom. Ikthalon lives in a dimension known as the Ice World of Ikthalon. Ikthalon is an embodiment of man's tendency to resist change, and thus represents frozen stagnation.

== Impossible City ==
Impossible City (real name Camelot) is the name of a character/mobile headquarters appearing in American comic books published by Marvel Comics. Created by writer Jed MacKay and artist Carlos Villa, it first appeared in Avengers (vol. 9) #3 (July 2023).

The Impossible City was originally the sentient headquarters of an unidentified group of heroes, who imprisoned the Ashen Combine, a group of evil monsters, within it. After the heroes disappear under mysterious circumstances, the Ashen Combine escape their prison, enslave the Impossible City, and erase its memories. The Ashen Combine later arrives on Earth-616, where they battle the Avengers. The City communicates with Captain America and Black Panther, who free it from the Combine's control. Afterward, the Impossible City agrees to become the Avengers' new headquarters.

The Impossible City aids the Avengers in their search for the Missing Moment, an inaccessible moment in time. It is revealed that the Impossible City was originally named Camelot and was the headquarters of the Twilight Court, a group formed by Myrddin to find the Missing Moment. The Impossible City had its memories and identity erased by Ashen Combine member Meridian Diadem before Myrddin restores them.

== Ina ==
Ina is a leopard whose mother was killed by a guard at the Central Park Municipal Zoo. Shanna O'Hara takes Ina and their sibling Biri to Dahomey, Africa to release them into the wild. The leopards are killed when the sorcerer Raga-Shah transfers their life forces into the blood-beast Ghamola, which Shanna is forced to destroy.

== Infectia ==
Infectia is a mutant in the Marvel Comics universe. She first appeared in X-Factor #28, published May 1988, and was created by Louise and Walt Simonson.

Her mutant power allowed her to induce lethally unstable mutations in humans. She served as a minor adversary of the X-Force until she died of the Legacy Virus in X-Men (vol. 2) #27 (December 1993).

During the Krakoan Age, Infectia is resurrected and becomes a refugee in the "Embassy of Limbo" in New York.

== Infinity ==
Infinity is an abstract entity, who embodies space. Her brother is Eternity, who embodies time. Eternity and Infinity are two sides of the same coin, representing the universe.

=== Infinity in other media ===
Infinity appears in Silver Surfer, voiced by Elizabeth Sheperd.

== Ink ==
Ink is a superhero appearing in American comic books published by Marvel Comics.

Eric Gitter was a former criminal who was recruited into Young X-Men by Donald Pierce (who was posing as Cyclops). Ink is paid to deliver Blindfold and Danielle Moonstar to Pierce, though he refuses to kill them. After learning of Pierce's involvement, Ink appears to suffer a crisis of conscience and leads the Young X-Men and New Mutants to Pierce's hideout. They subdue Pierce, but not before Wolf Cub is killed, leaving Ink to deal with his own feelings of guilt over his involvement.

It is later revealed that Ink is not a mutant, surprising both him and the Young X-Men. Suspecting a connection to his powers, they investigated his tattoo artist Leon Nunez, who admitted to being a mutant capable of granting powers through his tattoos. Ink helped his teammates to defeat Y-Men by stripping their powers by using Phoenix powers from a Phoenix symbol.

Ink is not a mutant himself but gained superpowers through the mutant tattoo artist Leon Nunez, who possessed the ability to grant powers through his tattoos. Nunez experimented extensively on Ink, granting him abilities including super-strength, flight, healing, disease inducement, explosive force, and even Phoenix powers.

=== Ink in other media ===
Ink appears in X-Men: Days of Future Past, portrayed by Gregg Lowe. This version is a G.I. during the Vietnam War whom William Stryker attempts to capture for Bolivar Trask's experiments before Mystique rescues him.

== Shola Inkose ==
Shola Inkose (sometimes spelled Shola Inkosi) is a character appearing in American comic books published by Marvel Comics. He first appears in Mekanix #1 (October, 2002), created by Chris Claremont and Juan Bobillo. Shola Inkose is a mutant who possessed telekinetic abilities. He demonstrated a high level of control with his telekinesis, allowing him to manipulate granite and fine dust.

Shola was born in Genosha, which was devastated by Wild Sentinels sent by Cassandra Nova. His family was killed in the disaster and he was left with traumatic flashbacks to the event caused by his linking with a telepathic resident of Genosha. Following the attack, Genosha is labeled as a terrorist state due to Magneto's actions. Shola moves to the United States, where he attends the University of Chicago and assists Kitty Pryde and Karma against anti-mutant adversaries.

Shola was kidnapped by Genoshan Magistrates alongside Karima Shapandar but was later freed and joined the Genoshan Excalibur.

Shola is among the countless mutants who lose their powers during the Decimation. Quicksilver restores his abilities using the Terrigen Mist, a mutagen that grants the Inhumans their powers. However, the effect is temporary and Shola's abilities soon fade.

== Inventor ==
Inventor is the name of two characters appearing in American comic books published by Marvel Comics.

=== Thomas Edison clone ===
As the first villain of Ms. Marvel, he first appeared in Ms. Marvel Vol. 3 #5 and was created by Sana Amanat, Stephen Wacker, and G. Willow Wilson.

As part of a plot to solve the world's problems, Dr. Gregory Knox attempts to create a cyborg clone of Thomas Edison. However, the DNA sample is inadvertently mixed with a sample from Knox's pet cockatiel, giving the clone a bird-like appearance. As the Inventor, the clone uses Knox in a plan to capture humans to use them as a power source. In the Inventor's ensuing fight with Ms. Marvel, one of his robots falls apart, crushing him to death.

During the "Dark Web" storyline, the Inventor is resurrected after being exposed to Madelyne Pryor's magic. The Inventor visits Knox and learns that he created several other Inventors like him who were stabilized with bird DNA. The Inventor kills Knox and sets out to find the Inventors and recruit them in his revenge plot against Ms. Marvel. Ms. Marvel drives off the Inventors while Bruno Carrelli kills the Inventor with an electromagnetic pulse.

=== Gregory Knox ===
Dr. Gregory Knox is a scientist who intends to solve the world's problems by making cyborg clones of notable inventors and thinkers. He starts off by trying to create a clone of Thomas Edison, only for the DNA sample to be tainted by his pet cockatiel. Knox is used in Inventor's plot until the Inventor is killed fighting Ms. Marvel.

Following Inventor's death, Knox became the second Inventor, utilizing a cockatiel outfit and several bionic animals: an alligator, a frog, an iguana, a snake, and a tortoise. He and his animals are defeated by Ms. Marvel.

During the "Dark Web" storyline, Knox is revealed to have retired and is confronted by a resurrected Inventor. Before being killed by the Inventor, Knox states that he created several other Inventors like him, who were stabilized with bird DNA.

== Ion ==
Ion is a character appearing in American comic books published by Marvel Comics.

Voletta Todd was born in Augusta, Georgia. She was the niece of World War II superhero, the Blazing Skull. Voletta became a nuclear physicist and was transformed by an experiment gone wrong, caught in an explosion of electromagnetically charged gas, and transformed into a living cloud of ionized plasma and hydrogen gas. This condition has made her bitter, often leading to violent behavior. She battled Machine Man, the Human Torch, and the Thing, and was sealed in a cryogenic tube.

Some time later, she escaped and became a professional criminal. She later appeared among an army of female superhumans gathered by Superia as her Femizons. alongside the other female superhumans, she battled Captain America and Paladin.

== Jason Ionello ==
- Further reading: Jason Ionello at the Comic Book DB (archived from the original); Jason Ionello at the Grand Comics Database

Jason Ionello is a character in Marvel Comics. The character, created by Kurt Busiek and Pat Olliffe, first appeared in Untold Tales of Spider-Man #1 (September 1995).

Jason Ionello was a popular student at Midtown High School who would often pick on Peter Parker along with Flash Thompson, Liz Allan, Sally Avril and Tiny McKeever. Ironically, they all idolized Spider-Man, not knowing that was actually Peter. He eventually attempted to learn Spider-Man's identity to earn a $1000 reward. He enlisted Sally's help in this endeavor, but became jealous when she flirted with Spider-Man. Later, Jason ran a red light while trying to catch Spider-Man, but collided with another vehicle. Sally was killed, and Jason suffered mild head trauma. Jason was left feeling bitter and soon turned on Flash and his friends. Jason disguises himself as Spider-Man and starts committing vandalism and brandishing a gun in an attempt to damage Spider-Man's reputation. Liz and Flash discover his exploits and talk him out of it.

=== Jason Ionello in other media ===
- Jason Ionello makes non-speaking cameo appearances in The Spectacular Spider-Man as part of Flash Thompson's football clique.
- Jason Ionello appears in media set in the Marvel Cinematic Universe, portrayed by Jorge Lendeborg Jr.
  - In Spider-Man: Homecoming, he co-hosts Midtown School of Science and Technology's news station with Betty Brant.
  - In Spider-Man: Far From Home, it is revealed that Ionello was a victim of the Blip before being resurrected by Bruce Banner.
  - Ionello makes a cameo appearance in Spider-Man: No Way Home.

== Iron Mask ==
Iron Mask is a character created by Stan Lee and Jack Keller who appears in American comic books published by Marvel Comics, particularly its Old West-themed comic titles, mostly as a recurring enemy of Kid Colt.

Don Hertz is a blacksmith living during the 19th century Old West era who decided to embark on a life of crime. Creating a suit of iron torso armor and helmet, he commits several bank robberies, during which he acquires a reputation for being invulnerable. He is confronted by Kid Colt, who defeats Iron Mask after he targets his opponent's unarmored limbs. In prison, Hertz forges himself a new armor suit, this time one covering his arms and legs as well. He breaks out and attacks Kid Colt, who tricks Hertz into chasing him through a river, whose waters rust the armor's joints solid, enabling his defeat and recapture.

Hertz breaks out of jail again, but is apprehended by Kid Colt and Rawhide Kid, who make him fall into a pit of water, which forces him to either surrender or drown. During a later confrontation, Iron Mask teams up with three of Kid Colt's other enemies - Bennington Brown, Doctor Danger and Fat Man - to rob the town of Phoenix disguised as circus performers, but they are defeated by Kid Colt.

In 1876, after having been inspired by stories about the time-travelling warlord Kang's exploits in the Old West, Iron Mask assembles a gang of contemporary supervillains under his leadership. Their activities catch the attention of Rawhide Kid, Two-Gun Kid and Phantom Rider, who team up with the time-stranded West Coast Avengers to defeat the gang and deliver them to the authorities.

After getting out of jail, Iron Mask continues his criminal life as the leader of a gang of normal bandits. He and his men are brought into the modern era's Savage Land by Dog Logan, who was trying to teach Wolverine's mutant students how to fight. Confused, Iron Mask and his gang battle Dog and the young mutants until Dog realizes his mistake and sends them back to their original time.

Iron Mask is killed in 1887, and more than a century later a coffin containing his body and armor is found in the possession of the witch Calcabrina.

=== Powers and equipment ===
Iron Mask's trademark iron armor rendered him virtually invulnerable to the firearms of his time. He also had above-average strength and endurance, enabling him to wear his armor in the climate of the Wild West for extended periods of time.

== Iron Mouse ==
Iron Mouse (Tony Yarg) is a character appearing in American comic books published by Marvel Comics.

Iron Mouse is an anthropomorphic mouse and animal version of Iron Man from Spider-Ham's universe, Earth-8311.

=== Iron Mouse in other media ===
Iron Mouse appears in the Ultimate Spider-Man episode "The Spider-Verse" Pt. 2, voiced by Steven Weber.

== Iron Patriot ==
Iron Patriot

Publication information
- Publisher: Marvel Comics
- First appearance: Dark Avengers #1 (March 2009)
- Created by: Brian Michael Bendis (writer); Mike Deodato (artist)

In-story information
- Alter ego: Various
- Notable aliases: American Son; Iron Hulk
- Abilities: Superhuman strength and durability; Supersonic flight; Flamethrowers; Energy repulsor and missile projection; Regenerative life support

The Iron Patriot is an alias used by several characters appearing in American comic books published by Marvel Comics. The concept first appeared in Dark Avengers #1 (March 2009), and was created by Brian Michael Bendis and Mike Deodato. It is an American patriotism-themed exoskeleton meant to evoke Iron Man and Captain America.

=== First version ===
The original Iron Patriot armor is used by Norman Osborn during the Dark Reign storyline to exert his authority as "commander" of H.A.M.M.E.R. and the Dark Avengers while using Oscorp's resources. Osborn's activities as the Iron Patriot have been jeopardized various times, such as when the New Avengers led by Captain America used the Iron Patriot's tracking device on Luke Cage as a trick to destroy his own house. During the siege of Asgard, the Iron Patriot is disabled during Osborn's fight with Steve Rogers and Tony Stark of the Avengers which revealed warpaint which tried to contain his Green Goblin alter-ego.

The Iron Patriot armor has been programmed with a low-level A.I. seen during the Marvel NOW! event. At a weapons expo, the Iron Patriot ends up stolen by A.I.M. for the Scientist Supreme's plans which is almost interrupted by Nick Fury Jr. and Daisy Johnson. An army of Iron Patriot drones are controlled by Marvin Flumm in order to incriminate the United States in international attacks, such as a false-flag attack on Iran where the Hulk is sent in response. Phil Coulson of S.H.I.E.L.D. uses holographic communication to hack so the Iron Patriot drones can understand these programmed actions are wrong. The Iron Patriot drones are next seen during the Inhumanity storyline as support.

=== Second version ===
The second Iron Patriot armor is temporarily worn by Rhodey Rhodes during the Iron Patriot series. His father Terrence Rhodes also uses the Iron Patriot armor to help stop a conspiracy in which he sacrifices himself.

Different versions of the Iron Patriot armor is utilized by Toni Ho as a member of the U.S. Avengers; a standard version, and a heavy combat variation.

=== Other versions ===
- The American Son is a patriotic-themed exoskeleton used by Harry Osborn during the Dark Reign storyline, and later by Gabriel Stacy.
- Sarah Garza is an Inhuman who can generate powerful explosions of energy, with her Iron Patriot armor acting as a regulator. Garza was a rookie member of the Secret Avengers.
- The Iron Hulk is Robert Maverick / Red Hulk utilizing the heavy combat Iron Patriot armor.
- Grant Rogers, an alternate universe version of Steve Rogers who is loyal to Hydra, utilizes elements of Tony Stark's armor to control Hydra as the Hydra Supreme / Civil Warrior.

=== Iron Patriot in other media ===
- Norman Osborn / Iron Patriot and Harry Osborn / Patrioteer appear in Ultimate Spider-Man, voiced by Steven Weber and Matt Lanter respectively.
- The Iron Patriot armor appears in Avengers Assemble.
- The Iron Patriot armor appears in films set in the Marvel Cinematic Universe (MCU). The first version appears in Iron Man 3, in which it is primarily used by James Rhodes. Additionally, a heavy combat Iron Patriot armor appears in Avengers: Endgame.
- The Iron Patriot armor appears in Marvel Snap.
- The Iron Hulk appears in Marvel Contest of Champions as the Maestro.
- An Iron Hulk-inspired armor appears in Iron Man and His Awesome Friends, where it is used by Amadeus Cho.

== Isca the Unbeaten ==
Isca the Unbeaten

Publication information
- Publisher: Marvel Comics
- First appearance: X-Men (vol. 5) #12 (Nov. 2020)
- Created by: Jonathan Hickman (writer); Pepe Larraz (artist)

In-story information
- Full name: Isca
- Species: Human mutant
- Team affiliations: Swordbearers of Arakko; Great Ring of Arakko
- Partnerships: Genesis (sister); Tarn the Uncaring (lover)
- Abilities: Inability to lose

Isca the Unbeaten is a character appearing in American comic books published by Marvel Comics. Created by writer Jonathan Hickman and artist Pepe Larraz, she first appeared in X-Men (vol. 5) #12 (November 2020). She is a mutant whose powers prevent her from ever losing.

Isca is from the ancient island of Okkara and is the younger sister of Genesis. When Amenthi Daemons invade the island and split it into Krakoa and Arakko, Isca's powers compel her to defect to the Daemons. After Arakko is sealed away in Amenth to stymie the invasion, Isca continues to fight against her people for Amenth.

Isca is recruited to fight in the X of Swords tournament on behalf of Arakko. When the arrival of the X-Men, the Captain Britain Corps, and the Vescora turn the battle in Krakoa's favor, Isca's powers compel her to defect to the opposing side. At the battle's conclusion, Isca travels to Earth with the rest of the Arakkii mutants and claims a seat on Arakko's ruling body, the Great Ring of Arakko.

When the Eternals declare war on mutantkind and send Uranos to attack Arakko, Isca's powers compel her to defect to their side, resulting in her killing fellow Great Ring member Idyll. At the conflict's end, Isca reigns from the Great Ring and goes into self-imposed exile.

=== Powers and abilities of Isca the Unbeaten ===
Isca is an Omega-level mutant with the power to never lose. Her powers will give her the skills required to win, manipulate probabilities in her favor, or slightly alter her appearance. In larger conflicts, she will be compelled to switch to the side that is most likely to win. Her power will also make her win even if victory is unfavorable for her. Isca's powers cannot be negated and they do not make her immune to dying or being killed if her death would result in her victory.

Isca is also very long-lived, having been alive for over 10,000 years.

=== Isca the Unbeaten in other media ===
- Isca appears in Marvel Snap.
- Isca received a HeroClix figurine, as did her sword Mercy.

== Iso ==
Iso (Xiaoyi Chen) is an Inhuman character, created by Charles Soule and Ryan Stegman, who first appeared in Inhuman #4 (August 2014).

Xiaoyi is among the latent Inhumans who had their abilities activated after the detonation of the Terrigen Mist bomb, gaining the ability to manipulate pressure. Initially, she is sought by the military for use as a weapon. However, Xiaoyi is rescued by Reader, a fellow Inhuman, and leaves China with him.

=== Powers and abilities of Iso ===
Iso is an Inhuman with the ability to manipulate pressure. She is able to intensify pressure in a specific area, creating blasts of force. Iso is also able to decrease the blood flow in a person's body, which she threatened to use to kill Karnak by making his head explode.

=== Iso in other media ===
Iso appears in Avengers Assemble, voiced by Tania Gunadi.

== Isolationist ==
Isolationist (Josef Huber) is a character appearing in American comic books published by Marvel Comics. Created by Peter David and Joe Quesada, he first appeared in X-Factor #89 (February 1993).

Josef Huber is a human who possesses the ability to mimic the different mutant abilities with the side effect having his right eye glow when his powers are in use. Driven insane by his inability to control his telepathy, Huber isolates himself in an Antarctican cave somewhere in an attempt to control his powers.

Following the Decimation, Huber seeks to eradicate the 198 remaining mutants. He was also revealed to be the benefactor of X-Cell. During the fight with X-Factor, the Terrigen Crystal that Rictor held on to caused Isolationist to retreat back to his cave by copying Dust's abilities.

== Itsy Bitsy ==
Itsy Bitsy is a character appearing in American comic books published by Marvel Comics.

Introduced in the storyline of the same name, Itsy Bitsy is an unnamed woman (known by alias Susan Mary, i.e. "Mary Sue") who was experimented on by Patient Zero and mutated upon being injected with the genetic templates of Spider-Man and Deadpool. Transformed into a blue-skinned spider-like humanoid with eight eyes and six arms, she is given the codename Itsy Bitsy.
