= Special Forces (comics) =

Comic book series

Special Forces is a creator-owned comic book limited series written and drawn by Kyle Baker, and published by Image Comics. The series details the lives and deaths of a platoon of misfit soldiers who are for one reason or another unsuitable for service, but who have nonetheless been recruited to fight in the Iraq War; one of the main characters is autistic. It was inspired by a 2006 incident in which the US Army recruited an autistic teenager.

The protagonist is a woman who spent her teenage years in reform school before finally using up her "three strikes" and being given a choice between life in prison or military service. She turns out to be the only competent member of her platoon, other than the autistic soldier, whose rigid insistence on following written orders makes him almost unstoppable.

The New York Times reviewed the 2009 trade-paperback collection of the first four issues, calling it "the harshest, most serrated satire of the Iraq War yet published."

The title is a pun on "special needs".
