= Double V campaign =

Black American campaign to promote democracy

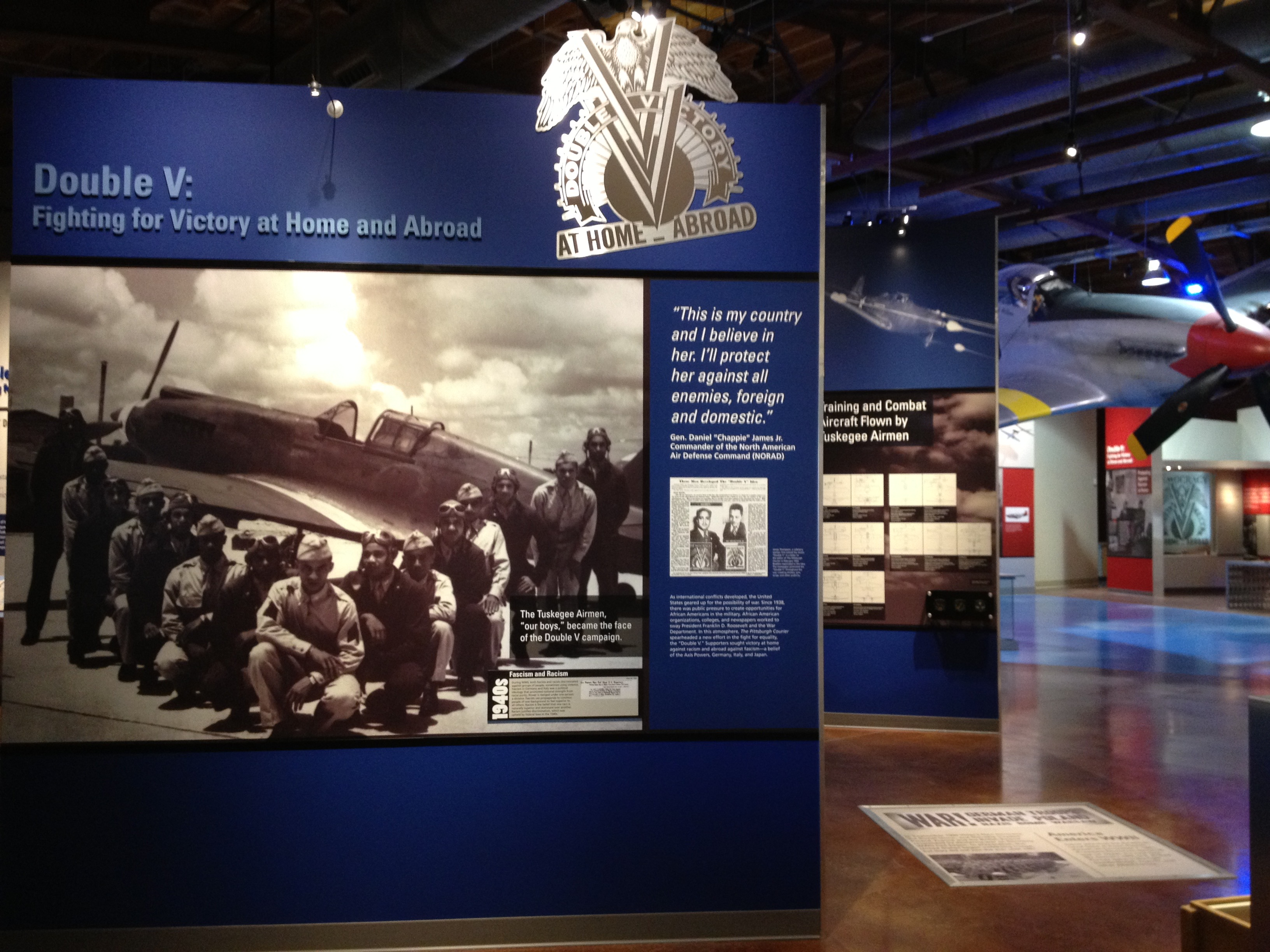
Exhibit on the campaign at the Harpers Ferry Center

The Double V campaign, initiated by the Pittsburgh Courier in February 1942, was a national effort to advocate for African American rights during World War II. The campaign promoted the idea of a "double victory": one abroad against fascism and the Axis powers, and at home against racism and discrimination.

Despite their service and sacrifices during the war, African Americans continued to face systemic inequalities, including discrimination in employment, segregation in military, and denial of civil rights. In response, the campaign sought to address the contradiction between fighting for democracy in overseas campaigns while being denied full citizenship at home.

The idea for the campaign originated from a letter written by James G. Thompson of Wichita, Kansas, published on January 31, 1942. In the letter, Thompson refers to the "V for victory" sign prominently displayed by countries fighting "for victory over aggression, slavery, and tyranny," but proposes the adoption of a second 'V' for African Americans fighting for freedom overseas and at home, "the first V for victory over our enemies from without, the second V for victory over our enemies from within." Pitched as "Democracy – Double Victory, At Home – Abroad," the campaign highlighted the risks Black soldiers and civilians took while participating in America's struggle against the Axis powers while being denied their rights as full American citizens back home.

== Aims of the Double V Campaign ==
From the perspective of victory abroad, the National Association for the Advancement of Colored People (NAACP) aimed to increase African American involvement in the war effort, which entailed inspiring Black men and women to contribute to World War II. With this increase in Black military presence, and thus, dedication to their country, the NAACP hoped to prove the value of their presence was reason enough to demand liberty at home. In an article titled "Black America Wars On Double Front For High Stakes" by Edgar T. Rouzeau in the Pittsburgh Courier on February 7, 1942, Rouzeau asserted that there were high stakes for Black Americans in the war, writing

"Where white America must fight on foreign soil for the salvation of the United States and for the preservation of "democracy," Black Americans must fight and die on these same battlefields, not merely for the salvation of America, not merely to secure the same degree of democracy for Black Americans that white Americans have long enjoyed, but to establish precedent for a world-wide principle of free association among men of all races, creeds and colors. That's the black man's stake."

The campaign lobbied for the US government to declare war on racial prejudice domestically, making up the second half of the Double V. This included lobbying for equal treatment in the military, federal legislation to stop allowing or enforcing poll taxes, criminalizing violence, such as lynching or mob induced, and new legislation for fair employment practices, especially in wartime industries. These demands were very relevant in the World War II era, given that many African Americans involved with the NAACP understood that the US's fight against Hitler's actions against Jews was an inherent contradiction since the government would do nothing about the oppression of Black Americans.

== Response to African Americans involvement in World War II ==
=== Response in the United States ===
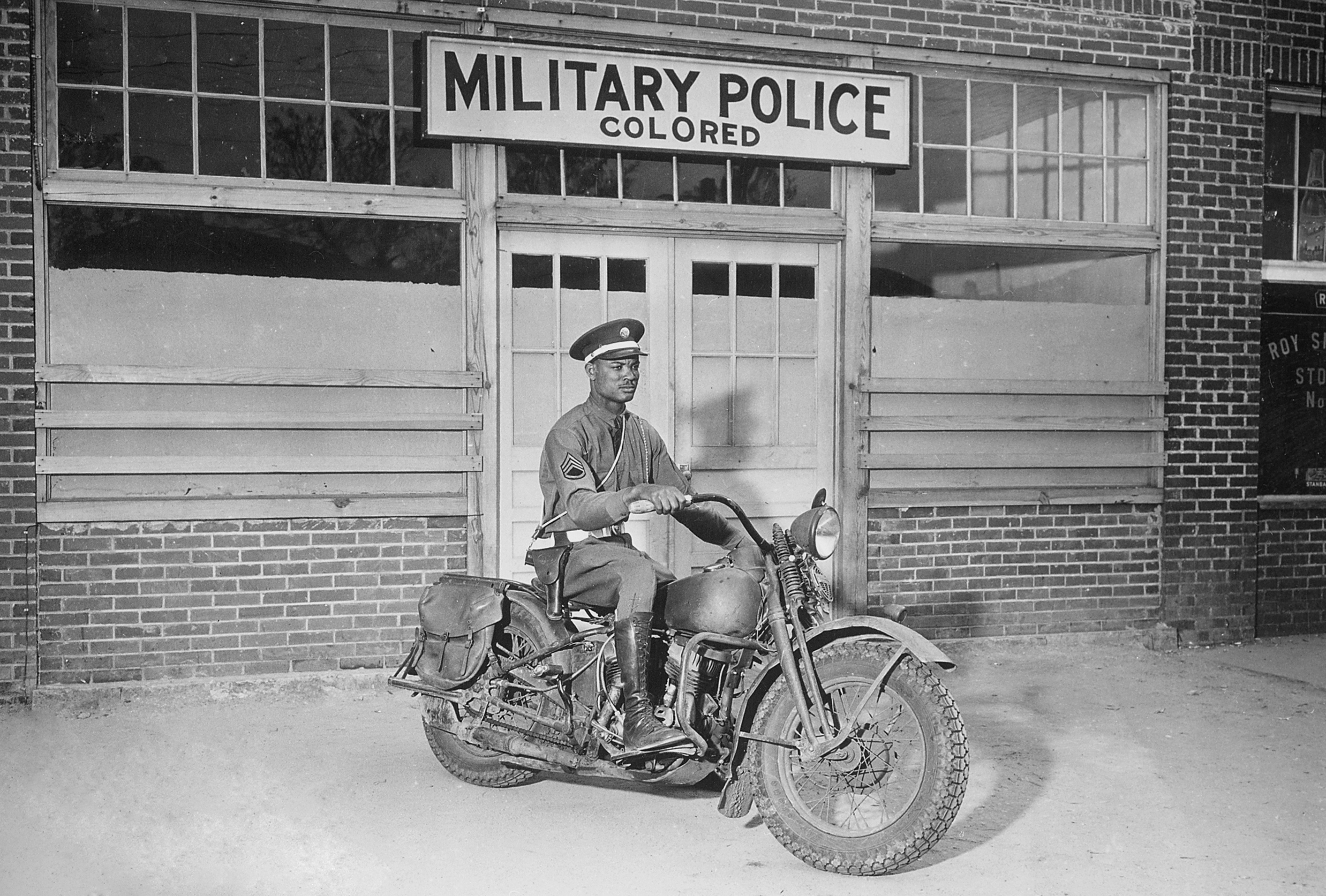
A Black military policeman in front of a "colored" entrance in Columbus, Georgia, 1942

African American soldiers who served abroad in the Second World War were subject to segregation within the U.S. armed forces, despite fighting on land that did not hold the same racist ideology as that which they experienced at home and during their service. Despite this discrimination still prevalent within the US, some concessions were made domestically in regard to the war effort. The Double V Campaign increased the demand for President Roosevelt issuing the Executive Order 8802 that banned employment discrimination in defense industries and civilian agencies of the federal government on grounds of race, creed or color. Racial violence against African Americans was especially common in military facilities in the South. From 1942 to 1943, due to the government's concern over racism in Europe while ignoring the problem of racism in America, riots broke out in Los Angeles, Beaumont, Detroit and Harlem. This reflected the frustration African Americans felt over Black soldiers enlisting or being drafted only to return and be treated as less than citizens. It was not until July 28, 1948, when President Harry S. Truman put forth Executive Order 9981, that the U.S. armed forces were racially integrated.

Domestically, official channels began to take notice of the growing disaffection amongst African Americans in relation to their involvement in World War II as well as the 'Double V Campaign', with an Office of War Information report being published in 1942 detailing the condition in America. Likewise, the FBI conducted their own investigation through its RACON (racial conditions in America) report, discovering that despite strong numbers of support in the war effort by African Americans, the discriminatory policies present at home as well as in the armed forces undermined US attempts to create a unified nation as well as highlighted the contradictions in American involvement in fighting against the oppression Nazi Germany, while displaying significant amounts of racism and xenophobia at home.

=== Response in Detroit ===
Upon the campaign's launch, African Americans in Detroit led efforts to advance the Double V Campaign in the United States. After the March on Washington Movement, headed by A. Philip Randolph, built momentum behind the Double V Campaign by staging large meetings and protests to win democratic freedoms for Black Americans during the war, communities in Detroit, Michigan, stepped up. Working closely with both the March on Washington Movement and the National Negro Congress, African Americans in Detroit learned and utilized mass demonstrations to advocate for changes in race relations, specifically within the Congress of Industrial Organizations and United Auto Workers. In addition to seeking out help from labor unions, Black employees at the Dodge manufacturing plants in Detroit protested against unfair upward mobility of unskilled White employees to higher-skilled and better-paying jobs within the war production industry than their Black counterparts. Protests, walkouts, and other production-stopping tactics against the Dodge-Chrysler industry proved successful when the Office of Production Management stepped in, which made way for Black employees to be promoted to skilled labor in tank and defense production at the Chrysler production plants. These wins within the CIO-UAW and Dodge were the first of many surrounding the upward mobility of Black people in the workforce and involvement in the war effort in Detroit. With the objective of the Double V Campaign in mind, Black Detroit went on to demand change within Packard Motor Company. The long and drawn-out fight for change at Packard led to a lot of political discontent regarding strategy, ideology, and race relations within both the workers' union and the Detroit area that eventually culminated in the 1943 Detroit race riot. Although this riot was the beginning of the end of the efforts in Detroit, the city was still able to make a lasting impact and contribution to the goals of the Double V Campaign, specifically by fighting for victory at home.

=== Response in Louisiana ===
Racial tensions at home were more and more evident, especially in the South. In Alexandria, Louisiana, tensions finally escalated into the 1942 Lee Street Riot. On January 10, 1942 police in Alexandria, Louisiana were notified of an African American soldier allegedly harassing a white woman. The white military police officer then pursued to assault the Black soldier and a riot ensued where police began shooting into the crowd and left 10 to 15 people dead with multiple others injured. The Riot was soon regarded as a reflection of the severity of racial tensions around the country (especially in the Jim Crow South). Despite receiving little contemporary coverage and remaining relatively unknown to in U.S. society, the Lee Street Riot (also referred to as the Lee Street Massacre) remains one of the bloodiest race riots during World War II and shed light on the severity of racial tensions in the United States. It also exacerbated the Double V Campaign's push for racial equality in not only in the U.S armed forces but in American society as well.

=== Response in Hawaii ===
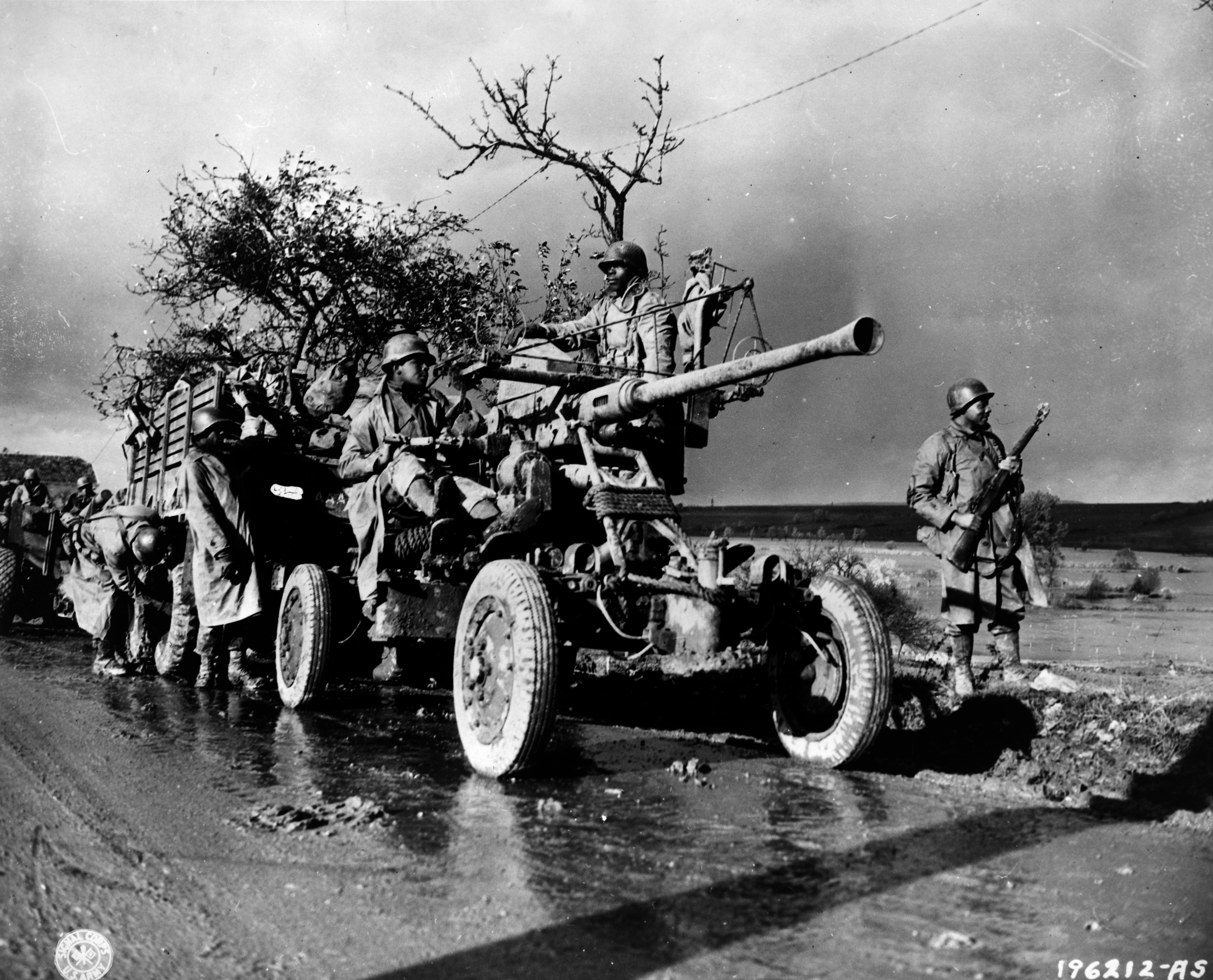
Black artillerymen in Belgium in November 1944. African-Americans volunteered in record numbers for World War II.

After the Japanese attack on the American naval base in Pearl Harbor, America sent in the 369th Division to defend the territory of Hawaii from air attacks. Response from Hawaiians toward the African American soldiers varied greatly. The territory was a volatile combination of racial tension and extreme state power, as it had not yet become a state, which wouldn't happen until 1959. Racially driven stereotypes regarding African Americans did exist on the island and included rumors spread by non-African American soldiers that Black soldiers had monkey tails. For example, many White soldiers refused to recognize higher-ranking Black officers. Although the stereotyping of Black Americans did occur, Hawaii did not have the ingrained segregation found within America at this time. There was no established place for African Americans as Jim Crow segregation laws within America had kept White and Black people in separate social spheres. The discrimination African Americans experienced within the military in Hawaii fueled their fight to see the "Double V" campaign succeed. However, their experience of life in a community that didn't have such established racial ideas demonstrated what a double victory could achieve.

== Role of the press ==
Due to the lack of coverage of Black issues in mainstream White newspapers, African Americans had to create their own press to share information relevant their communities. These newspapers and their influence increased during the war, as they provided critical war updates. The Black press emerged as a vibrant space for rhetorical expression and Black social, political, and cultural activity, which was its primary function. It reflected the frustrations of the Black community, which was often more radical than the press itself. The campaign first appeared in the Pittsburgh Courier, an African American newspaper, on February 7, 1942. The Pittsburgh Courier in particular helped to shed more light on the achievements of African Americans serving in the army and navy, as well as challenge the segregationist policies that existed in these branches. The newspaper claimed that public response to the campaign was overwhelming, receiving many letters and telegrams that expressed support, while the Double V symbol displayed in the Pittsburgh Courier appeared in several other Black newspapers until 1943. One particularly impactful story publish by the Courier in 1942 featured Doris Miller, an African American sailor who displayed heroism during the Attack on Pearl Harbor. While working as a cook aboard the USS West Virginia (BB-48), Miller helped carry wounded soldiers to safety during the attack, as well as manned a .50 caliber Browning anti-aircraft machine gun and fired on the Japanese planes until he ran out of ammunition. The black press thus used Miller's story to bring attention to the role of African Americans within the armed forces, and the Pittsburgh Courier's constant coverage eventually led the Navy and the FDR administration to recognize his contribution, awarding him the Navy Cross, setting a precedent for greater visibility of the role of African Americans in helping with the war effort. While the Pittsburgh Courier led the campaign nationally, women editors also played a pivotal role in amplifying it regionally; Charlotta Bass, publisher and editor of the California Eagle. The oldest Black newspaper on the West Coast, used her platform to editorialize against military segregation and connect the campaign's goals to the lived experiences of Black soldiers and civilians in Los Angeles. The NAACP’s own publication, The Crisis, was founded in 1910 by W. E. B. Du Bois and is widely recognized as the oldest Black-oriented magazine in the world. During the Double V campaign, the magazine served as a significant platform for wartime civil rights advocacy by advancing the NAACP’s demands for military desegregation and equal employment opportunities.

=== Circulation and content ===
The Pittsburgh Courier was the most highly circulated Black newspaper during the war, with a readership of around 350,000. Other Black newspapers followed suit and adopted the campaign, including the Chicago Defender and the Amsterdam Star-News. Since the Black press had been criticized for insufficient patriotism, they created the Double V Campaign as a means to counter this idea and promote patriotism among African Americans despite the hypocrisy of the US government. However, newspapers such as the Chicago Defender and Pittsburgh Courier also detailed discrimination and racism which African American troops were facing abroad during the war.

== Role of colleges and universities ==
A method used to push the Double V Campaign was higher education. To get African Americans prepared to contribute to the war effort, colleges and universities were used to teach the necessary skills for war. By 1942, 75 black colleges and universities participated in the National Defense Program in their own way or aspects. Almost 30 colleges had started to introduce new educational courses to teach black students on subjects such as electronics, welding, nursing, mechanical arts. Many schools also implemented federal programs such as the Engineering, Science and Management War Training (ESMWT). In total, nearly 80% of all black colleges and universities had refocused their curriculums to offer defense training in order to get more black soldiers involved the war. Despite the eagerness of new African American recruits, they would be turned away by employers in the South out of fear in case of possible strikes and violence. Many would be encouraged to take up roles on shipyards in the northern or western United States instead.

== Results of the Campaign ==
=== Double V's Advancements ===
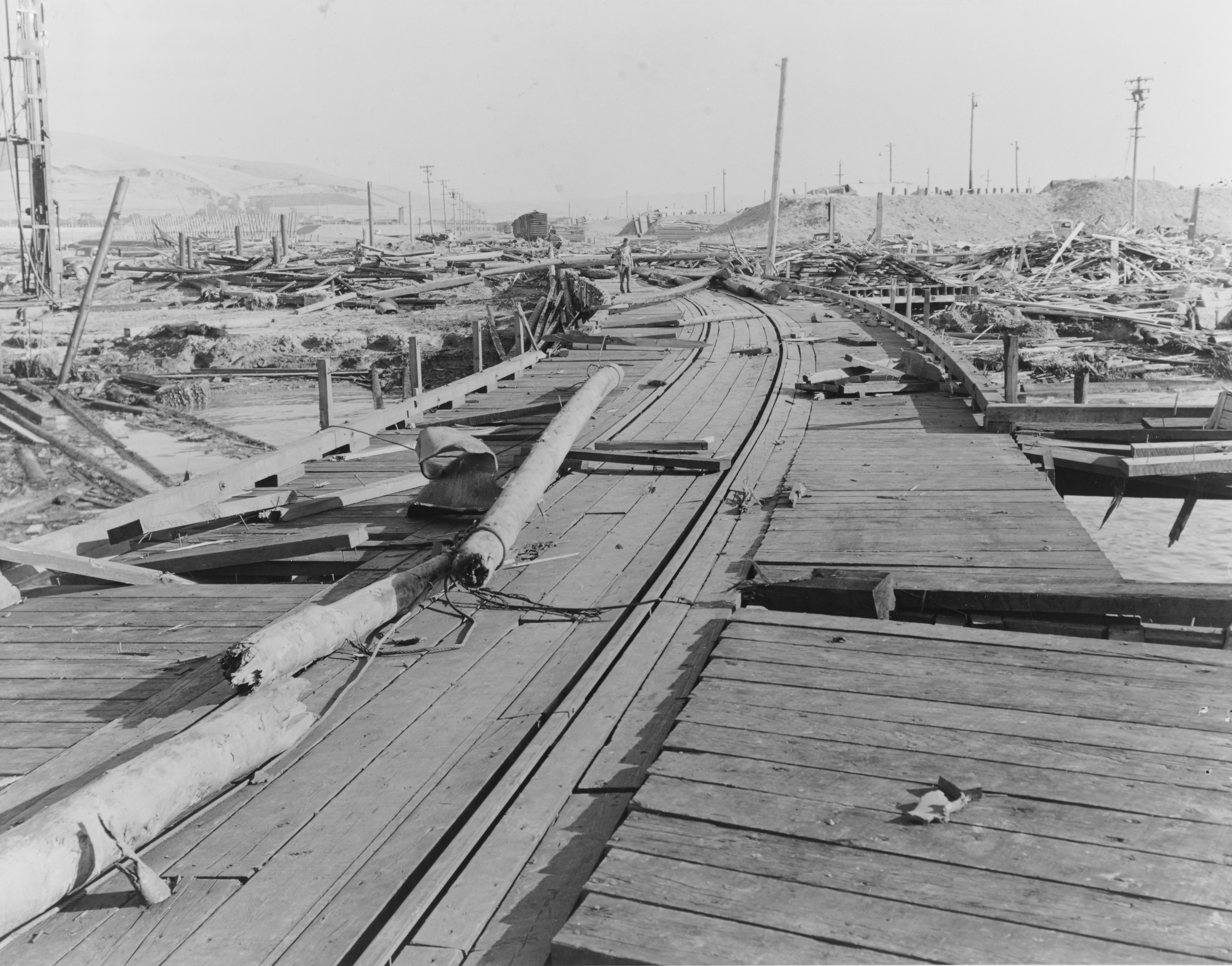
The Port Chicago disaster, which bolstered support for the campaign

The campaign had limited success. While it promoted patriotism and support for the war effort among African Americans, especially as the Allies won the war, it fostered a narrow appreciation for the complexity of African American wartime situations, and it did not address or impact the underlying structure of America's systems of institutional racism. The campaign was also not a unifying force as many White, Southern newspapers and journalists criticized the slogan and characterized it as a dangerous revolution. The government tried to get the Black press to cease its agitation in an effort for greater rights.

Among African Americans, the Double V campaign had a 91% approval rating and was supported by various institutions and organizations, such as North Carolina A&T State University and United Automobile Workers. Support for the campaign was bolstered by wartime events such as the Port Chicago disaster and the Agana race riot, which underscored the disparities Black soldiers faced. The campaign also played a role at home in encouraging defense industries to hire African American employees who left the South in large numbers for the urban North and West Coast during the Second Great Migration to help the nation's war effort.

The campaign aided in reshaping attitudes within the military regarding race, helping to legitimize the role African Americans played in the US war effort in the eyes of society at large. This came in the form of a report ("Attitudes of the Negro Soldier") issued by the Research Branch of the Special Service Division of the US armed forces, which made the suggestions that important military duties should be assigned to black soldiers while news of military achievements performed by black soldiers should receive greater coverage and recognition, all done in an effort to convey to US citizens the crucial role played by African Americans in winning the war.

=== Results of the press ===
The press had a vital role in creating and spreading the idea of Double V in an effort to get more readers and Black men to enroll in the Army and support the war effort, as it was not a "white man's war." If Black people did not support the war effort and help America win, it could be problematic to win equality back home. It was difficult to emphasize the importance of African American involvement in the war at a time when discrimination was apparent both in conscription and the wartime labor force. In addition, it was also a response to Franklin D. Roosevelt, who had encouraged five editors of the top Black newspapers in the United States to reduce the discontent and apathy of their readers toward the war.

=== The End of the Double V Campaign ===
By 1943, the campaign died down due to threats of legal action, pressure from the Roosevelt administration, government agencies, and an intensifying war led to the press placing a greater emphasis on fighting the war overseas rather than at home. The Pittsburgh Courier only mentioned the successes of the campaign from that point on. However, it is still considered to be a turning point within African American history which led to unity among the Black population in regard to achieving this double victory in the long run. The slogan and wartime protests marked a key development within Black protest movements and aided in laying the groundwork for the future Civil Rights Movement. Demands for change did not stop, as the NAACP still was calling for the end of segregation in the Army and Navy in 1944. Despite the efforts of many, including African American soldiers, the campaign had not fully achieved its goal as discrimination was still legal in America after the war. In this regard, the White House also failed to respond to progressive change within the African American population. However, the Double V Campaign helped lay the foundations for the later achievements and concessions made by the Civil rights movement as many of those Democrats elected to Congress between 1948 and 1958 were influenced by the increased wartime racial progressivism and were instrumental in challenging the Conservative coalition's dominance in Congress, thus providing the necessary conditions in which the Civil Rights Act of 1964 and the Voting Rights Act of 1965 were able to be passed.

== See also ==
- African-American newspapers
- American propaganda during World War II
- Civil Rights Movement
- Isaiah Bradley - fictional character from Marvel Comics uses shield with Double V campaign emblem
- Louis Austin
- Military history of African Americans
