= Kyle Baker =

American cartoonist, comic book writer and artist

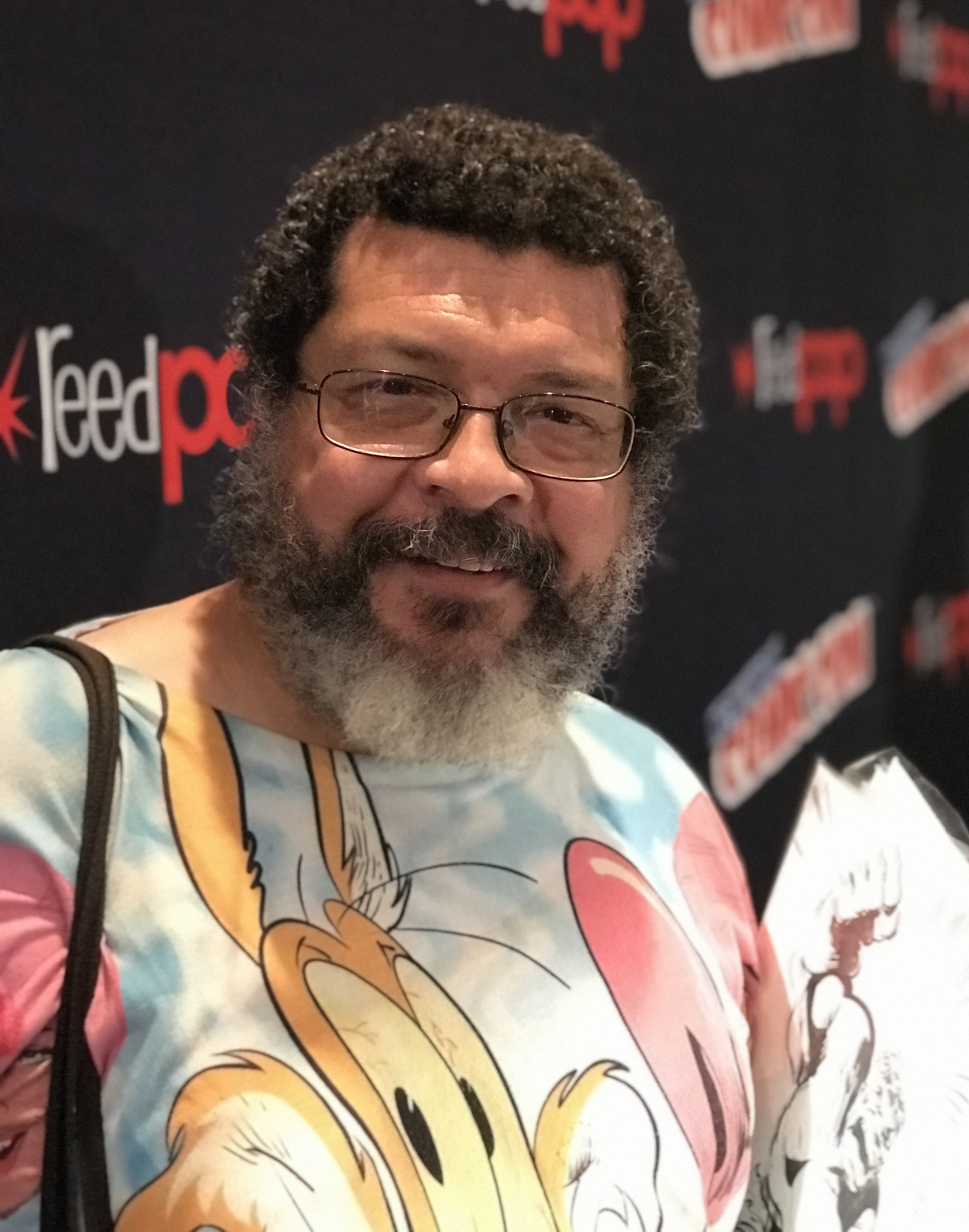
- Baker at the New York Comic Con
- Born: Kyle John Baker; 1965 (age 60–61) Queens, New York, U.S.
- Areas: Cartoonist, Writer, Penciller, Inker, Publisher, Letterer, Colourist
- Notable works: Why I Hate Saturn; Plastic Man; Nat Turner
- Awards: Eisner Awards (eight); Harvey Awards (five); Glyph Comics Awards (five); Inkpot Award

Kyle John Baker (born 1965) is an American cartoonist, comic book writer-artist, and animator known for his graphic novels and for a 2000s revival of the series Plastic Man.

Baker has won numerous Eisner Awards and Harvey Awards for his work in the comics field.

== Biography ==
=== Early life and career ===
Kyle Baker was born in Queens, New York City, the son of art director John M. Baker and high-school audiovisual-department manager Eleanor L. Baker. He has a brother and a sister, Edwin Baker and Cheryl Baker, and now, three daughters and a son - Lillian, Jacqueline and Madeleine Baker, and Isaac Baker. His parents had both attended Pratt Institute in Brooklyn, New York, and his father, who, Baker said, "worked in advertising [and] made junk mail", would "draw pictures for us and entertain us." Aside from this exposure to art, Baker has said, his early artistic influences included comic book artist Jack Kirby, caricaturist Jack Davis, and painter and magazine illustrator Norman Rockwell. He noted:

When I was a little boy I loved the funny papers. ... I used to read Pogo, Li'l Abner, Peanuts, Blondie and B.C. among others. I loved to draw Johnny Hart's B.C. characters and the Muppets. I made up my own cartoon characters and drew stories about them. I loved Mad magazine. I had paperback reprints of the early [Harvey] Kurtzman stories, illustrated by Wally Wood, Will Elder, and Jack Davis. I loved Disney movies. ... I would come home from the movies and practice drawing the characters. I drew little animated flip books on index cards. When I was 11, I had a Super-8 movie camera and I made animated cartoons. I remember making a 'King Kong' out of clay, and a drawing of a New York skyline, and I made a stop-motion film of King-Kong fighting model airplanes. In junior high school, I drew comic books and Xeroxed them at my dad's office. I sold the Xeroxes for five cents each. I think I made fifteen cents.

Other influences included the Charlton Comics artwork of Jim Aparo and Steve Ditko.

=== Breaking into comics ===
In his senior year of high school, Baker became an intern at Marvel Comics, making photocopies and filing fan mail. "I sort of fell into Marvel because I happened to know somebody there," he said. "But I always thought I was going to do funny stuff" rather than superhero comics. He became background assistant to Marvel inker Josef Rubinstein, and later also assisted Vince Colletta and Andy Mushynski. He cited Marvel artists Walt Simonson, Al Milgrom and Larry Hama and writer and editor-in-chief Jim Shooter as providing him art and storytelling advice. Part of his duties involved photocopying, and he would take copies of John Buscema penciling home on which to practice inking. While working for Marvel, Baker attended the School of Visual Arts, in Manhattan, studying graphic design and printmaking, but dropped out after two years. Through that connection, however, he began freelancing with famed graphic designer Milton Glaser, an SVA instructor, assisting him on a set of children's books.

Baker's first credited work at Marvel is penciling the half-page entry "Kid Commandos" in The Official Handbook of the Marvel Universe #13 (February1984). After a handful of inking assignments on issues of Transformers, The Avengers Annual #14 (1985) and elsewhere, Baker made his professional story-illustration debut as penciler and inker of the publisher Lodestone Comics' Codename: Danger #2 (October 1985), with a 23-page story written by Brian Marshall, Mike Harris, and Robert Loren Fleming. Cover penciling and more interior inking for Marvel and occasionally DC followed. His first story penciling for one of the two major comics companies was the three-issue Howard the Duck: The Movie (December 1986 - February 1987), adapting the 1986 film Howard the Duck, and which he self-inked.

During this time, Baker also attempted to sell humor spot illustrations, but was rejected by the major newspaper syndicates. Jim Salicrup, a Marvel editor, did commission him "to write a few one-panel gags about [the superhero team] the X-Men", titled "It's Genetic" and appearing in the Marvel-produced fan magazine Marvel Age.

=== First graphic novel ===
At the recommendation of freelance artist Ron Fontes, an editor at the Dolphin imprint of the publishing house Doubleday expressed interest in Baker's sample strips of the character Cowboy Wally, "and asked if I had any more. I lied and said I did." This led to the 128-page graphic novel Cowboy Wally. "The character of Noel was pretty much based on me," Baker said in 1999. "I lie all the time. The first part of the books is the collected strips, and the other three chapters were written for the book. "It didn't sell many copies," Baker said, "but at least it convinced DC [Comics] I should be allowed to draw, not just ink."

Baker went on to draw DC's 1980s comics revival of the pulp fiction hero The Shadow, beginning with The Shadow Annual #2 (1988), followed by the monthly series from issue #7 to the final issue, #19 (February 1988 - January 1989). He did assorted other DC work including Justice, Inc. In 1990, Baker and writer Len Wein produced three issues of Dick Tracy for The Walt Disney Company's Hollywood Comics, the first two issues containing original stories, the third an adaption the 1990 Dick Tracy film.

He began scripting comics around this time: Baker penciled and inked First Comics' Classics Illustrated #3 & 21 (February 1990 & March 1991), adapting, respectively, Through the Looking Glass and Cyrano de Bergerac. While Peter David scripted the latter, Baker himself wrote the adaptation of the Lewis Carroll work. "I'd never planned to become a writer," Baker said in 1999. "I wrote short gags, like the kind you see in the newspapers and Cowboy Wally, but not stories. I only learned to write stories because people kept paying me to write them. In the years 1991-1994, 90 percent of my income was from writing, and I received very few offers to draw. I figured I should learn to write."

=== Why I Hate Saturn, commercial illustration ===
Baker's Why I Hate Saturn, 1998 reprint edition

Baker achieved recognition and won an Eisner Award for his 1990 graphic novel Why I Hate Saturn, published by the DC Comics imprint Piranha Press. Baker said in 1999 of his breakthrough work:

I wrote Why I Hate Saturn at a time when comic books had stopped being fun for me. I was tired of being told how to draw and what to draw. And I was sick of begging people to let me work the way I wanted. Editors told me my stuff was 'underground' and 'alternative'. I decided that if I were going to work in a creatively oppressive atmosphere and not even be allowed to own my work, I might as well go to Hollywood and be oppressed for big money. Back in the eighties, DC and Marvel wouldn't let you own your characters, and Fantagraphics had no money. So when I finally got permission to do Why I Hate Saturn, a book I'd been trying years to sell, I decided to write it like a sitcom and send it to Hollywood. ... However, I don't have anything to do with the [then-proposed] Why I Hate Saturn movie. DC controls those rights. I don't own those characters, so it is of no interest to me.

Baker's cartoons and caricatures began appearing in BusinessWeek, Details, Entertainment Weekly, ESPN, Esquire, Guitar World, Mad, National Lampoon, New York, The New York Times, Rolling Stone, Spin, Us, Vibe, and The Village Voice. He spent three years illustrating the weekly strip "Bad Publicity" for New York magazine.

=== Animation ===
Baker's animation has appeared on BET and MTV, and in animated Looney Tunes projects, including the animated feature Looney Tunes: Back in Action. Baker was "guest art director" for Cartoon Network's Class of 3000, and storyboarded the Class of 3000 Christmas special.

in 1994, Baker directed an animated video featuring the hip hop singer KRS-One, called "Break The Chain". Marvel Comics had published Break the Chain as a comic book packaged with a read-along hip-hop audiocassette. That same year and next, he contributed to the four-issue Dark Horse Comics humor anthology Instant Piano (December 1994 - June 1995), including drawing the cover of the premiere. For another anthology, DC's Elseworlds 80-Page Giant #1 (August 1999), Baker drew, colored, lettered and with his wife, teacher Elizabeth Glass, whom he married July 18, 1998, wrote the 10-page parallel universe story "Letitia Lerner, Superman's Babysitter". It would win a "Best Short Story" Eisner Award despite DC destroying all copies intended for the North American market after deeming some of the content unsuitable, though copies were still distributed in Europe.

Baker said in 1999 he was writing a Christmas movie for Paramount Pictures, titled U Betta Watch Out, and was animating a TV-movie title Corey Q. Jeeters, I'm Telling on You.

At this point in his career, Baker stated in an interview, "Nobody tells me what to write or how to draw. Only an idiot would dare tell Kyle Baker how to make a good cartoon. Hollywood and the magazine world are full of idiots. They water my stuff down and make it unfunny."

He is credited with writing and storyboarding on the Phineas and Ferb television episodes "Candace Loses Her Head" and "Are You My Mummy?".

=== 2000s ===
Baker drew writer Robert Morales' Marvel Comics miniseries Truth #1-7 (January–July 2003), a Captain America storyline with parallels to the Tuskegee experiment. He also wrote and drew all but two issues (#7 and #12) of the 20-issue comedic adventure series Plastic Man vol. 4 (February 2004 - March 2006), starring the Golden Age of Comic Books superhero created by Jack Cole for Quality Comics. Baker contributed to the Dark Horse Comics series The Amazing Adventures of the Escapist, a spin-off of Michael Chabon's novel, The Amazing Adventures of Kavalier & Clay.

In 2006, his company, Kyle Baker Publishing, serialized a four-part comic book series about Nat Turner, and published the series The Bakers, based on his family life, in two anthologies, Cartoonist and Cartoonist Vol. 2: Now with More Bakers. He has also continued to provide comics material sporadically to Marvel, DC and Image Comics through at least 2010. In 2007 and 2008, Image Comics published Baker's six-issue Image Comics miniseries Special Forces, a teen-soldier military satire that criticizes the exhortation of felons and disabled Americans into military service. The New York Times reviewed the 2009 trade-paperback collection of the first four issues, calling it "the harshest, most serrated satire of the Iraq War yet published."

In 2008, Watson-Guptill published How to Draw Stupid and Other Essentials of Cartooning, Baker's art instruction book. That same year, Baker hosted the comics industry's Harvey Awards. In 2010, he became regular artist on Marvel Comics' mature-audience MAX-imprint series, Deadpool Max.

Most recently, he was inducted into the Eisner Hall of Fame at San Diego Comic Con on July 25, 2025.

== Bibliography ==
=== Early work ===
- Codename: Danger #2: "From the Halls of Montezuma ..." (a, with Robert Loren Fleming, Mike Harris and Brian Marshall, Lodestone, 1985)
- The Cowboy Wally Show (w/a, graphic novel, 128 pages, Doubleday, 1988, ISBN 0-385-24122-4)
- Asylum #2: "Death Disenchanted" (a, with Fred Schiller, New Comics Group, 1989)
- Dick Tracy #1-3 (a, with John Francis Moore and Len Wein, Walt Disney Company, 1990)
- Classics Illustrated (Berkley Publishing):
  - Lewis Carroll: Through the Looking-Glass (w/a, in #3, tpb, 48 pages, 1990, ISBN 0-425-12022-8)
  - Edmond Rostand: Cyrano De Bergerac (a, with Peter David, in #21, tpb, 48 pages, 1991, ISBN 0-425-12528-9)

=== Marvel Comics ===
- Marvel Super Special #41: "Howard the Duck: The Movie" (a, with Danny Fingeroth, 1986)
- Nightmask #11: "Nightmare in New Orleans" (a, with Roy and Dann Thomas, 1986)
- What The--?! #3-4: "Mutant Beach Party!" (a, with Kurt Busiek, 1988)
- Classic X-Men #38: "Strangers on a Lift" (a, with Ann Nocenti, 1989)
- Critical Mass #2: "St. George: A Knight without Armor" (a, with D. G. Chichester and Margaret Clark, Epic, 1990)
- Clive Barker's Hellraiser #7: "Clowning Around" (a, with D. G. Chichester, Epic, 1991)
- Damage Control #1: "The Sure Thing" (a, with Dwayne McDuffie, 1991)
- Epic Lite #1: "Al Space" (w/a, Epic, 1991)
- Break the Chain (a, with KRS-One, one-shot, Marvel Music, 1994)
- Truth: Red, White & Black #1-7 (a, with Robert Morales, 2003)
- Marvel Romance Redux: Restraining Orders are for Other Girls: "My Magical Centaur!" (w, with Don Heck, 2006)
- X-Men Fairy Tales #2: "The Friendship of the Tortoise and the Eagle" (a, with C. B. Cebulski, 2006)
- Deadpool:
  - Deadpool #900: "One Down" (a, with Charlie Huston, 2009)
  - Deadpool: Merc with a Mouth (a, with Victor Gischler):
    - Deadpool: Merc With a Mouth (hc, 328 pages, 2010, ISBN 0-7851-4534-6; tpb, 2011, ISBN 0-7851-4407-2) incl
  - Prelude to Deadpool Corps #5 (a, with Victor Gischler, 2010)
  - DeadpoolMAX (a, with David Lapham and Shawn Crystal, 2010–2012)

=== DC Comics ===
- The Shadow #8-19, Annual #2 (a, with Andrew Helfer, 1988–1989)
- Action Comics #610: "Phantom Stranger: Kenny and the Demon!" (a, with Paul Kupperberg, 1988)
- Justice, Inc. #1-2 (a, with Andrew Helfer, 1989)
- Why I Hate Saturn (w/a, graphic novel, 200 pages, Piranha Press, 1990, ISBN 0-930289-72-2)
- Justice League America #50: "Ktrrogarrx!" (w/a, 1991)
- Fast Forward #2: "Lester Fenton & the Walking Dead" (w/a, Piranha Press, 1992)
- Elseworlds 80 Page Giant: "Letitia Lerner, Superman's Babysitter" (w/a, with Liz Glass, 1999)
- Batman: Gotham Knights #11: "Snow Job!" (a, with Bob Kanigher, 2001)
- Just Imagine Stan Lee with John Buscema Creating Superman: "On the Street" (a, with Stan Lee and Michael Uslan, co-feature, 2001) collected in Just Imagine Stan Lee Creating the DC Universe Volume 1 (tpb, 216 pages, 2002, ISBN 1-56389-891-8)
- 9-11 Volume 2 (graphic novel, 224 pages, 2002, ISBN 1-56389-878-0):
  - "Still Life" (a, with Ed Brubaker)
  - "The Call" (a, with Eddie Berganza)
  - "What We Learned Today" (a, with Eddie Berganza)
- Plastic Man vol. 4, #1-6, 8-11, 13-20 (2004-2006) (w/a)
- The Spirit: #7 (2007); vol. 2, #2 (2010)
  - "N.I.M.B.Y" (a, with Harlan Ellison)
- Countdown #23: "The Origin of Mr. Mxyzptlk" (a, with Scott Beatty, co-feature, 2007)
- Wednesday Comics #1-12: "Hawkman" (w/a, 2009)
- MAD: "The All-Time Pantheon of Oddball Music Fans" (a, with Mike Snider, in #343, 1996)
- MAD: "Joey Buttafuoco's Guide to Chivalry" (a, with C. J. Burke, in #356, 1997)
- Gen^{13}: Carny Folk: "Sideshow on the Edge of Forever" (a, with John Arcudi, one-shot, Wildstorm, 2000)
- ABC Special: "Spectors from Projectors" (a, with Alan Moore, 2001)
- Tom Strong #13: "The Family Strong and the Tower at Time's End!" (a, with Alan Moore, Chris Sprouse, Russ Heath Jr. and Peter Poplaski, 2001)

==== Vertigo ====
- You are Here (w/a, graphic novel, 160 pages, 1998, ISBN 1-56389-442-4)
- V2K: I Die at Midnight (w/a, one-shot, 2000)
- King David (w/a, graphic novel, 104 pages, 2002, ISBN 1-56389-866-7)
- Undercover Genie (w/a, a collection of short strips and illustrations from non-comics publications, 128 pages, 2003, ISBN 1-4012-0104-0)
- House of Mystery #10: "Fig's Adventure in Stuffytown" (a, with Peter and Bethany Keele, 2010)
- Mystery in Space: "The Dream Pool" (a, with Kevin McCarthy, one-shot, 2012)

=== Kyle Baker Publishing ===
- The New Baker: "The Cartoon Issue" (w/a, one-shot, 2003)
- The Bakers: Do These Toys Belong Somewhere? (hc, 96 pages, 2006, ISBN 0-9747214-3-3) collects:
  - Cartoonist (w/a):
    - Volume 1 (tpb, 128 pages, 2004, ISBN 0-9747214-0-9)
    - Volume 2: Now with More Bakers (tpb, 128 pages, 2005, ISBN 0-9747214-1-7)
  - The Bakers (w/a, one-shot, 2005)
- Nat Turner #1-4 (w/a, 2005)

=== Other publishers ===
Dark Horse:

- The Residents: Freak Show: "Everyone Comes Here, Nobody Laughs When They Leave" (w/a, graphic novel, 80 pages, 1992, ISBN 1-56971-001-5)
- Instant Piano #1-4 (w/a, 1994–1995)
- Michael Chabon Presents: The Amazing Adventures of the Escapist #1: "Sequestered" (a, with Kevin McCarthy, 2004)
- The Bakers Meet Jingle Belle (a, with Paul Dini, one-shot, 2006)
- Creepy #8: "Loathsome Lore" (a, with Dan Braun, 2012)
- Birth of a Nation: A Comic Novel (a, with Reginald Hudlin and Aaron McGruder, graphic novel, 144 pages, Crown, 2004, ISBN 1-4000-4859-1)
- Bart Simpson's Treehouse of Horror #12: "Blood Curse of the Evil Fairies!" (w/a, Bongo, 2006)
- Goosebumps Volume 3: "The Horror at Camp Jellyjam" (w/a, graphic novel, 144 pages, Graphix, 2007, ISBN 0-439-85782-1)

Image:

- Special Forces #1-4 (w/a, 2007–2009)
- The Bakers: Babies and Kittens (w/a, hc, 96 pages, 2008, ISBN 1-58240-813-0)
- Rocketeer Adventures 2 #3: "Butchy Saves Betty" (w/a, IDW Publishing, 2012)

=== Covers only ===
- Web of Spider-Man #9 (Marvel, 1985)
- The Spectacular Spider-Man #112 (Marvel, 1986)
- Marvel Age #43, 83 (Marvel, 1986–1990)
- The Amazing Spider-Man #287 (Marvel, 1987)
- The Greatest Joker Stories Ever Told hc (DC Comics, 1988)
- Action Comics #603 (DC Comics, 1988)
- Critical Mass #1, 4 (Epic, 1990)
- Challengers of the Unknown #3 (DC Comics, 1991)
- Monster Menace #1 (Marvel, 1993)
- Marvel Tales #282 (Marvel, 1994)
- Doom Patrol #76-87 (Vertigo, 1994–1995)
- Dr. Strange vs. Dracula #1 (Marvel, 1994)
- Showcase '94 #4 (DC Comics, 1994)
- 2099 Unlimited #5-6 (Marvel, 1994)
- Gen^{13} #40 (Wildstorm, 1999)
- The Comics Journal #219 (Fantagraphics Books, 2000)
- Peter Parker: Spider-Man #42-43 (Marvel, 2002)
- Back Issue #8 (TwoMorrows, 2005)
- Tales from the Crypt #1 (Papercutz, 2007)

== Awards ==
- Eisner Award, Best Writer/Artist—Humor:
  - 1999 - Kyle Baker, You Are Here (DC Comics/Vertigo)
  - 2000 - Kyle Baker, I Die at Midnight (DC/Vertigo); "Letitia Lerner, Superman's Babysitter" in Elseworlds 80-Page Giant #1 (DC)
  - 2004 - Kyle Baker, Plastic Man (DC); The New Baker (Kyle Baker Publishing)
  - 2005 - Kyle Baker, Plastic Man (DC); Kyle Baker, Cartoonist (Kyle Baker Publishing)
  - 2006 - Kyle Baker, Plastic Man (DC); The Bakers (Kyle Baker Publishing)
- Eisner Award, Best Short Story:
  - 2000 - "Letitia Lerner, Superman's Babysitter" by Kyle Baker in Elseworlds 80-Page Giant (DC)
- Eisner Award, Best New Series:
  - 2004 - Plastic Man, by Kyle Baker (DC)
- Eisner Award, Best Title for Younger Readers/Best Comics Publication for a Younger Audience:
  - 2005 - Plastic Man, by Kyle Baker and Scott Morse (DC)
- Eisner Award, Best Reality-Based Work
  - 2006 - Nat Turner, by Kyle Baker (Kyle Baker Publishing)
  - 2014 - The Fifth Beatle: The Brian Epstein Story, with Vivek Tiwary and Andrew C. Robinson
- Eisner Award, Hall of Fame
  - 2025 - Voters' Choice
- Harvey Award, Best Graphic Album of Original Work:
  - 1991 - Why I Hate Saturn by Kyle Baker (Piranha Press)
  - 1999 - You Are Here by Kyle Baker (Paradox Press)
  - 2014 - The Fifth Beatle: The Brian Epstein Story, with Vivek Tiwary and Andrew C. Robinson (Dark Horse)
- Harvey Award, Best New Series:
  - 2005 - Plastic Man, by Kyle Baker (DC)
- Harvey Award, Special Award for Humor:
  - 2005 - Plastic Man, by Kyle Baker (DC)
  - 2006 - Plastic Man, by Kyle Baker (DC)
- Harvey Award, Best Graphic Album of Previously Published Work
  - 2009 - Nat Turner (Abram Books)
- 2006 Glyph Comics Awards
  - Story of the Year - Nat Turner, Kyle Baker, writer and artist
  - Best Artist: Kyle Baker, Nat Turner
  - Best Cover: Nat Turner #1, Kyle Baker, illustrator
- 2007 Glyph Comics Awards
  - Best Artist: Kyle Baker, The Bakers
- 2008 Glyph Comics Awards
  - Best Artist: Kyle Baker, Nat Turner: Revolution
