= Monica Rappaccini =

- Monica Rappaccini alongside A.I.M. troops as seen on the textless cover of Ant-Man & Wasp #3 (January 2011). Art by Salva Espin and Guru-eFX.

Publication information
- Publisher: Marvel Comics
- First appearance: Amazing Fantasy vol. 2 #7 (2005)
- Created by: Fred Van Lente; Leonard Kirk

In-story information
- Alter ego: Dr. Monica Rappacini
- Species: Human
- Team affiliations: H.A.M.M.E.R. J.A.N.U.S. A.I.M.
- Notable aliases: Doctor Rappaccini; Scientist Supreme
- Abilities: Engineering, biochemist, cybernetics, physics, and robotics expert; Genius-level intellect; Teleportation belt

Monica Rappaccini is a supervillain appearing in American comic books published by Marvel Comics. Created by Fred Van Lente and Leonard Kirk, the character first appeared in Amazing Fantasy vol. 2 #7 (2005). Rappaccini is a genius-level biochemist and the Scientist Supreme of the supervillain organization A.I.M.

== Publication history ==
Monica Rappaccini debuted in Amazing Fantasy vol. 2 #7 (2005), and was created by Fred Van Lente and Leonard Kirk. She appeared in the 2007 Super-Villain Team-Up MODOK's 11 series. She later appeared in the 2017 The Unstoppable Wasp series. She also appeared in the 2020 Ravencroft series, and the 2020–2021 miniseries M.O.D.O.K.: Head Games.

== Fictional character biography ==
Monica Rappaccini went to New Mexico's Desert State University to study and shared a brief relationship with physics student Bruce Banner while enrolled as a biochemistry student at the University of Padua. She used their relationship to exploit Banner's radiation expertise for her own research. Upon attaining her doctorate, Rappaccini quickly became a world-renowned innovator of antitoxins and antidotes for various environmental poisons and nearly won a Nobel Prize.

Recognizing the many environmental and political failings of Western civilization, Rappaccini decides that it is too corrupt to exist. She joins a series of terrorist organizations, such as the pan-European leftist group the Black Orchestra, and then Advanced Idea Mechanics (A.I.M.), where she had a brief relationship with fellow agent George Tarleton. Making poisons instead of curing them, Rappaccini's expertise with toxins allows her to rise quickly through A.I.M.'s ranks. She implanted her daughter and several other newborn children of A.I.M. members with memetic antibodies. She released them into the world as A.I.M. Waker agents with no knowledge of their heritage. They programmed to travel instinctively to the nearest A.I.M. biohaven when their antibodies activated at age 16. Her daughter was raised in Vermont by undercover A.I.M. agents as Carmilla Black.

Monica Rappaccini went underground for nearly two decades and studied potential power sources such as the sentient Uni-Power. She orchestrates attacks on capitalism, such as the dioxin-based gas attack on Hong Kong. When the A.I.M. Scientist Supreme is killed by MODOK, Rappaccini becomes the head of a splinter faction of A.I.M. independent from MODOK's control. Following his numerous defeats, Rappaccini's splinter group absorbs more cells into a sizable rival faction. She is made Scientist Supreme of this "true" version of A.I.M. She rarely does field work as A.I.M.'s leader, preferring to act through agents and proxies.

Rappaccini leads A.I.M. in attacking the United States Army Medical Research Institute for Infectious Diseases, but is thwarted by Carmilla Black who had since joined forces with S.H.I.E.L.D. as the costumed superheroine Scorpion. Rappaccini eludes capture and attempts to harness the malfunctioning Uni-Power, but her plans are thwarted by Scorpion and several superheroes who bonded with the Uni-Power.

Her A.I.M. faction is involved in an A.I.M. civil war against MODOK and Sean Madigan that draws in several of the Marvel superheroes, including Ms. Marvel. After Ms. Marvel thwarts a plan to turn MODOK into a bomb, Rappaccini reunites A.I.M. under her control.

Rappaccini infiltrates the supervillain group MODOK's 11 with A.I.M.'s new robot the Ultra-Adaptoid, which is impersonating the Chameleon. She attempts to prevent MODOK from obtaining a weapon called the Hypernova and using it to erase all life on Earth. She had a stated aim to stop A.I.M. from creating "inventions that turn around and try to destroy us." In the end, MODOK gains the Hypernova, and Rappaccini gave him $1 billion dollars in exchange for it - which, unknown to her, had been MODOK's plan all along, as he had already worked out that the Hypernova would grow unstable and explode. A.I.M.'s base is destroyed in the explosion and Rappaccini is presumed dead.

During the "Dark Reign" storyline, it is revealed that Rappaccini survived and came into conflict with Mockingbird and Ronin. She also hires Deadpool to retrieve a batch of baby M.O.D.O.C.'s enhanced to warp reality from H.A.M.M.E.R. headquarters.

During the Avengers vs. X-Men storyline, Noh-Varr locates a secret A.I.M. base where Rappaccini and the A.I.M. agents who escaped following Norman Osborn's defeat were hiding out. The Avengers raid the base and arrest Rappaccini and the other A.I.M. members.

She then escaped from prison and fought the new Wasp. Monica Rappaccini was later seen as a member of J.A.N.U.S.

During the "Stark-Roxxon War" storyline, Monica Rappaccini leads A.I.M. in collaborating with Roxxon, intending to acquire Stark Industries. When Iron Man arrives at A.I.M.'s facility in Caspen, Colorado and fought the second Force, Rappaccini sends her scheduler out to break up the fight and invite Iron Man to a luncheon. While trying to get Stark Industries to allow the merger to happen, Rappaccini states that she did not sanction Justine Hammer into attacking and rigging Iron Man's armors. In addition, she has enlisted the services of Doctor Druid who is working for her by choice. The merger deal falls through after Iron Man persuades the board members to change their votes in exchange for Belasco not claiming their souls.

== Powers and abilities ==
Monica Rappaccini is an expert in robotics, chemistry, physics, engineering, biotoxins, and biochemistry. Her inventions include the enhanced lymphatic system of the A.I.M. Waker agents that granted them total immunity to all biological, chemical and radiological weapons, memetic antibodies, synthetic microbes that attack the human psyche and trigger pre-coded memories and impulses, hallucinogenic drugs that deliver programmed hallucinations before being absorbed into the system; and many innovative weapons of mass destruction, from gas attacks to nanobacterial bombs.

Her A.I.M. uniform belt contains a phasing device that allows her to teleport. She keeps many different devices at hand, varying upon her situation and opponent. When facing a captured Hank Pym, she boasts that she kept 157 methods of containing him on hand.

== Reception ==
Melody MacReady of Screen Rant called Monica Rappaccini one of the "most ruthless villains of the Marvel Universe," writing, "Monica is manipulative, prejudiced, murderous, and proud of what she does; this was best shown when she was one of the best villains in the game Marvel's Avengers."

== Other versions ==
=== House of M ===
An alternate version of Monica Rappaccini from Earth-58163 appears in the "House of M" storyline. She works alongside Scorpion and the Hulk to overthrow Governor Exodus' fascist mutant government in Australia.

=== Death's Head 3.0 (Earth-6216) ===
An alternate version of Monica Rappaccini appears in the alternate future timeline in Death's Head 3.0. She created the Uni-Alias, an artificial version of Captain Universe's Uni-Power. Decades later, Rappaccini's granddaughter Varina Goddard becomes a senior Scientist in A.I.M. and utilizes the Uni-Alias as a power source for the robot Death's Head.

=== Ant-Man: Natural Enemy ===
An alternate version of Monica Rappaccini appears in Ant-Man: Natural Enemy. This version murdered animals when she was a child, especially ants.

== In other media ==
=== Television ===
- Monica Rappaccini / Scientist Supreme appears in Spider-Man, voiced by Grey DeLisle. This version oversees the organization's front at the Bilderberg Academy boarding school by posing as its headmistress.
- Monica Rappaccini / Scientist Supreme appears in M.O.D.O.K., voiced by Wendi McLendon-Covey. This version is an A.I.M. scientist and work rival of the titular character. Additionally, she has a teenage daughter named Carmilla who was the result of Monica creating a male clone named "Manica" and having him inseminate her. Introduced in the episode "If Bureaucracy Be Thy Death!", it is revealed that she once greatly admired MODOK and applied for A.I.M. to work together, but she developed a hatred for him after MODOK took credit for her killing a major yet unnamed member of the Avengers. Complicating this however, she later realizes that MODOK supports her endeavors and put her in a higher position so she can continue her work. After A.I.M. goes bankrupt and is bought out by GRUMBL, the latter promotes Monica to Scientist Supreme, but limits her work. By the end of the series, MODOK convinces her to leave A.I.M., though she decides to continue working for MODOK at his new company, A-I-M-2.

=== Video games ===
- Monica Rappaccini / Scientist Supreme appears in Marvel Powers United VR, voiced by Jennifer Hale.
- Monica Rappaccini / Scientist Supreme appears in Marvel Strike Force.
- Monica Rappaccini / Scientist Supreme appears in Marvel's Avengers, voiced by Jolene Andersen. This version is a senior executive of A.I.M. who assists Dr. George Tarleton in his efforts to control the growing Inhuman population and cares for him after he was mutated due to exposure to a Terrigen crystal. Upon discovering her injections were derived from Captain America's blood and accelerated his mutation instead, Tarleton injects Rappaccini with it and leaves her for dead. It is later revealed that Rappaccini survived after transplanting an Inhuman's duplication ability to herself off-screen. Following Tarleton's defeat by the Avengers, she takes over A.I.M. as Scientist Supreme and meets with the organization's board of directors, vowing to renew A.I.M. experiments and develop new technology.
  - In the DLC expansions "Taking A.I.M.", "Future Imperfect", "Cosmic Cube", "War for Wakanda", and "No Rest for the Wicked", Rappaccini leads A.I.M. in building a time gate and works with Nick Fury, Hawkeye, and her future self to avert a Kree invasion. She creates the Cosmic Cube to stop the aliens, but it freezes her and everyone around her in time while the rest of the world falls into chaos. Meanwhile, a clone of the present Rappaccini continues working on the Cosmic Cube until the Avengers and Hawkeye's future self intervene to stop her from destroying reality, with the latter sacrificing himself and killing Rappaccini to do so. Despite this, another clone of Rappaccini hires Ulysses Klaue and Crossbones to help her invade Wakanda for its vibranium and leading scientists. However, Klaue kills most of the scientists in pursuit of his own goals, prompting Rappaccini to cut ties with Klaue and lead A.I.M. in a separate attack on Wakanda. Due to the Avengers' work in dismantling A.I.M., Rappaccini revives Tarleton to preserve the organization, but he kidnaps her instead.
