= Yelena Belova =

Marvel Comics character

- Yelena Belova as depicted in Secret Avengers (2013) #5; Art by Luke Ross

Publication information
- Publisher: Marvel Comics
- First appearance: Design: Marvel Knights: Wave 2 Sketchbook #1 (January 1998); Character: Inhumans #5 (January 1999)
- Created by: Devin Grayson; J.G. Jones; Paul Jenkins; Jae Lee

In-story information
- Species: Human
- Place of origin: Moscow, Russia
- Team affiliations: Russian Federation; S.H.I.E.L.D.; Hydra / A.I.M.; Thunderbolts
- Notable aliases: Black Widow; Super-Adaptoid; White Widow
- Abilities: Expert marksman and mastery of various weapons; Master martial artist and hand-to-hand combatant; Expert gymnast, acrobat and aerialist

Yelena Belova (Russian: Еле́на Бело́ва) is a character appearing in American comic books published by Marvel Comics. Created by writer Devin Grayson and artist J. G. Jones, the character appeared as a sketch in Marvel Knights: Wave 2 Sketchbook #1 (January 1998) before debuting a year later in the second volume of Inhumans #5 (January 1999) by writer Paul Jenkins and artist Jae Lee.

Trained as an assassin in the Russian-based Red Room, Belova became the second modern-era character to use the Black Widow moniker, after Natasha Romanova. Originally sent to kill Romanova, the two became allies and have since worked together. Belova also became a version of Super-Adaptoid as a member of Hydra and A.I.M., before being freed and adopting the codename White Widow. Belova has been part of various teams and organisations including S.H.I.E.L.D. and the Thunderbolts.

Florence Pugh portrays the character in the Marvel Cinematic Universe (MCU) in the films Black Widow (2021), Thunderbolts* (2025) and Spider-Man: Brand New Day (2026), and the Disney+ television series Hawkeye (2021) and Marvel Zombies (2025). Pugh's version is depicted as the adopted sister of Natasha Romanoff / Black Widow, and the adopted daughter of Alexei Shostakov / Red Guardian and Melina Vostokoff.

== Publication history ==
Yelena Belova first appeared as a sketch in Marvel Knights: Wave 2 Sketchbook #1 (January 1998) by writer Devin Grayson and artist J.G. Jones. She debuted in Inhumans (Vol. 2) #5 (March 1999) by writer Paul Jenkins and artist Jae Lee. Belova starred in and was full introduced in the mini-series Black Widow (1999) by Grayson and Jones, as part of the Marvel Knights imprint. Belova was introduced as the second incarnation of the Black Widow after Natasha Romanova (Natasha Romanoff), her obsession turned rival.

Belova went on to star alongside Romanova and Daredevil in a second miniseries titled Black Widow (2001). The next year, she starred in her first solo three-issue miniseries, Black Widow: Pale Little Spider (2002) by writer Greg Rucka and artist Igor Kordey, under the mature audience Marvel MAX imprint,

== Fictional character biography ==
Yelena Belova was born in Moscow in Soviet times and later recruited into the Russian Federation (GRU). She was trained to be an assassin in the Red Room by the spymasters who trained Natasha Romanova, the first Black Widow later turned Avenger.

After the death of her trainer, she is activated and deployed to investigate his death. She tracks down and kills the killer, unaware that the task was a ploy to get Belova to assert herself as the new Black Widow. Believing herself the rightful successor to the title, Belova volunteers to eliminate Romanova. During their confrontation, Romanova calls Belova "little one", encourages her to explore her personal identity rather than blindly devote herself to her nation, and subjects her to a cruel manipulation to teach her the reality of the espionage industry. Belova remains loyal to the GRU but retires to Cuba, where she becomes a successful businesswoman and model.

Belova is recruited by the espionage agency S.H.I.E.L.D., and becomes involved in the agency's vibranium mining in the Savage Land. Shortly afterward, she barely survives an attack by Sauron, receiving severe burns and disfiguring injuries. She is later approached by a man working for the terrorist organization Hydra who offers her revenge against S.H.I.E.L.D. and the New Avengers. Belova is experimented on and genetically altered by Advanced Idea Mechanics (A.I.M.) scientists working for Hydra, who transform her into a version of the Super-Adaptoid. With this body, Belova gains the ability to copy the Avengers' powers. She is eventually defeated by a combination of Iron Man's armors and the Sentry's Void persona; in which the latter she absorbs along with the Sentry's powers. After her defeat, Hydra disables her with an implanted remote fail-safe mechanism.

Romanova assumes Belova's identity on behalf of Nick Fury and works with a vigilante group named the Vanguard. During the Dark Reign event, she joins Norman Osborn's Thunderbolts. Osborn reveals to Scourge that he has the real body of Belova in stasis, warning her that she could be his replacement on the team. Belova is later freed by A.I.M. and joins their High Council. S.H.I.E.L.D. soon targets A.I.M. and deploys agents Romanova, Hawkeye and Mockingbird to execute A.I.M. member Andrew Forson. Belova attacks Romanova but is later shot by an A.I.M. agent after being mistaken for Mockingbird.

After the events of Secret Empire, Belova was revived in a clone body and assumed the Black Widow identity once again in Romanova's honor (who she believes is dead). She travels around the world to destroy Hydra's remnants, attracting the attention of Hawkeye and the Winter Soldier. Belova later assumed the White Widow monika. She is recruited as a member of the Winter Soldier's Thunderbolts team to take down the Red Skull.

== Powers and abilities ==
Belova is a trained spy and assassin with extensive training in hand-to-hand combat, gymnastics and martial arts. She has often been described to be in "peak athletic condition".

As the Super-Adaptoid, Belova could mimic the abilities of other superheroes and absorb power from those around her.

== Reception ==
=== Listicles ===
List rankings for Yelena Belova
Publication	List	Rank	Ref.
Comic Book Resources	10 Most Powerful Russians In Comics	7	
Scary Mommy	195+ Heroic Marvel Female Characters	—N/a	
Screen Rant	10 Best Versions Of Black Widow From Marvel Comics	—N/a	
Screen Rant	The Red Room's Most Powerful Members	—N/a	

== In other media ==
=== Television ===
Yelena Belova appears in Avengers Assemble, voiced by Julie Nathanson. This version is the second incarnation of the Black Widow after Baron Strucker reactivated the Red Room program and the self-proclaimed rival of Natasha Romanoff. Belova later rechristens herself the Crimson Widow while acting as a Hydra agent.

=== Marvel Cinematic Universe ===
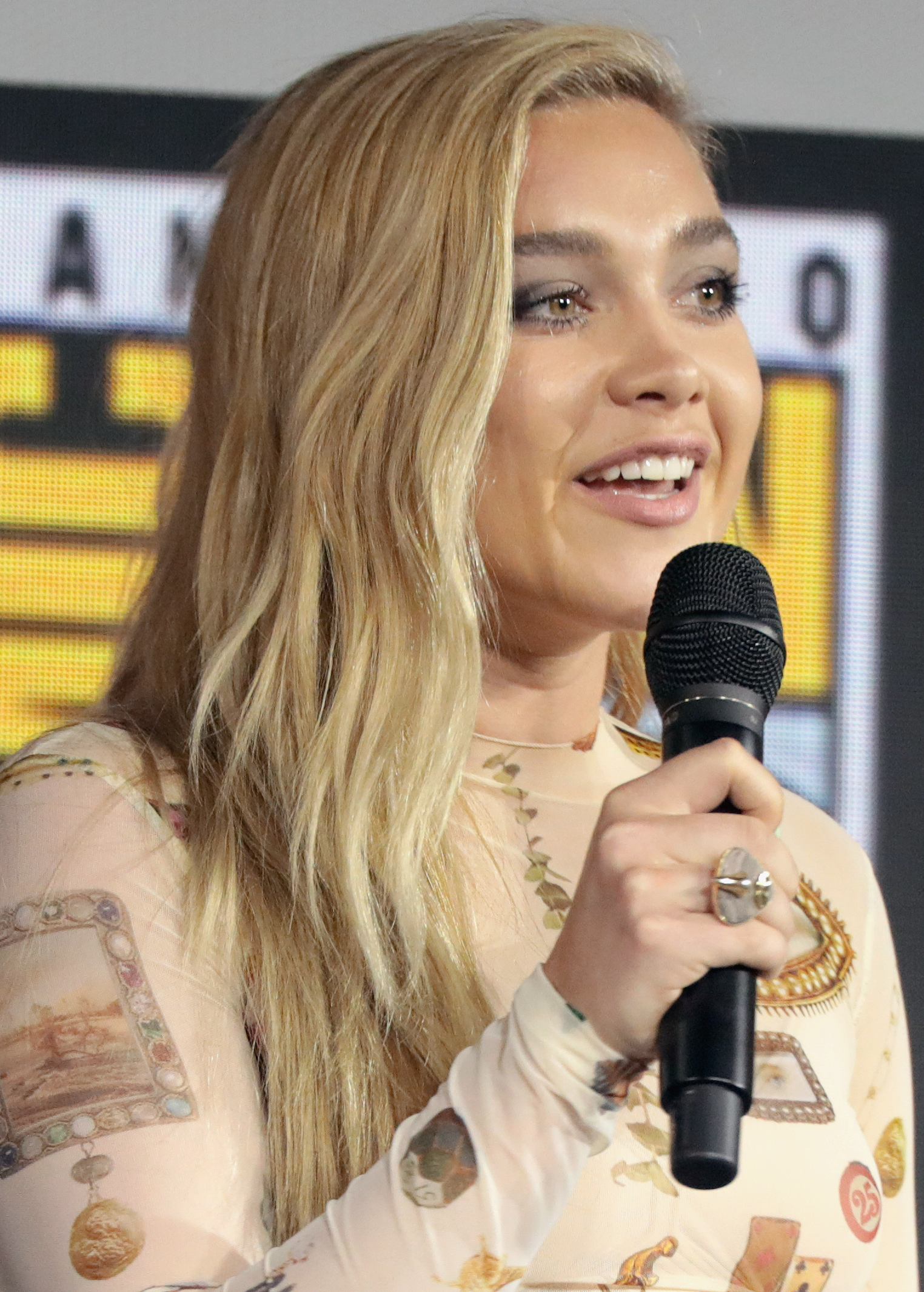
Florence Pugh promoting Black Widow at the 2019 San Diego Comic-Con

Yelena Belova appears in the Marvel Cinematic Universe (MCU), portrayed by Florence Pugh as an adult and Violet McGraw as a child. This version is an adopted sister to Natasha Romanoff, the adopted daughter of Alexei Shostakov and Melina Vostokoff, and was trained to be a Black Widow assassin in the Red Room. The character has appeared in the films Black Widow (2021),, Thunderbolts* (2025) and Spider-Man: Brand New Day (2026). She also appeared in the Disney+ miniseries Hawkeye (2021). Pugh voiced an alternate version of Belova in the Disney+ adult animated television series Marvel Zombies (2025). She is also slated to appear in the upcoming film Avengers: Doomsday (2026).

=== Video games ===
- Yelena Belova's Black Widow suit appears as an alternate skin for Natasha Romanoff / Black Widow in the PlayStation Portable version of Marvel Ultimate Alliance, Marvel Heroes, and Marvel Ultimate Alliance 3: The Black Order.
- Yelena Belova / Black Widow appears in The Punisher: No Mercy as an agent of S.H.I.E.L.D.
- Yelena Belova / Dark Widow appears as a miniboss in Marvel Avengers Alliance.
- Yelena Belova / Black Widow appears as a mini-boss and unlockable playable character in Marvel Puzzle Quest, with the MCU incarnation being added in a later update.
- Yelena Belova / Black Widow appears as a playable character in Marvel Contest of Champions as part of the Black Widow film tie-in update.
- Yelena Belova / Black Widow appears as a playable character in Marvel Future Fight as part of the Black Widow film tie-in update.

=== Miscellaneous ===
- Yelena Belova appears in Marvel Knights – Spider-Woman: Agent of S.W.O.R.D., voiced by JoEllen Anklam.
- Yelena Belova appears in Marvel Knights: Inhumans, voiced by Sarah Edmondson.
- Yelena Belova appears in New Avengers: Breakout, written by Alisa Kwitney. This version is Natasha Romanoff's former friend and roommate from the Red Room program who joins a rogue S.H.I.E.L.D. faction.
- A future incarnation of Yelena Belova appears in Marvel's Wastelanders, voiced by Eva Amurri. This version uses the alias of Samantha Sugarman.

== Collected editions ==
Title	Issues	Cover dates	Writer	Penciller	Description
Black Widow: The Itsy Bitsy Spider	#1–3	June – August 1999	Devin Grayson	J. G. Jones	The Marvel Knights limited series, titled "The Itsy Bitsy Spider", has Natasha question her claim to the role of Black Widow when she is challenged by the younger spy Yelena as both track down a biotoxin. Grayson and Jones first introduced Yelena in Inhumans #5 to use her in this series.
Black Widow	#1–3	January – March 2001	Devin Grayson and Greg Rucka	Scott Hampton	The second volume of Black Widow to feature Natasha and Yelena.
Black Widow: Pale Little Spider	#1–3	June – August 2002	Greg Rucka	Igor Kordey	Pale Little Spider, published under the adults-only Max imprint, was the first solo series featuring Yelena on her own.
Black Widow: The Things They Say About Her	#1–6	November 2005 – April 2006	Richard K. Morgan	Sean Phillips	In this series, Natasha goes into hiding as Nick Fury and Daredevil hunt her on behalf of S.H.I.E.L.D., with Yelena appearing as a supporting character.
Widowmakers: Red Guardian and Yelena Belova	#1	January 2021	Devin Grayson	Michele Bandini	A one-shot featuring Yelena and Red Guardian.
Wastelanders: Black Widow †	#1	March 2022	Steven S. DeKnight	Well-Bee	Five one-shot comics were published as an adaptation of the Marvel's Wastelanders podcast set in the post-apocalypse world of Old Man Logan. Wastelanders: Black Widow features an older version of Yelena.
White Widow: Welcome to Idylhaveven	#1–4	January – April 2024	Sarah Gailey	Alessandro Miracolo	A four-part limited series featuring Yelena.
