= Doomsday Man =

- The Doomsday Man on the cover of The Avengers (vol. 3) #17 (June 1999), art by Tom Smith and Jerry Ordway

Publication information
- Publisher: Marvel Comics
- First appearance: Silver Surfer #13 (February 1970)
- Created by: Stan Lee (writer); John Buscema (artist)

In-story information
- Species: Robot
- Place of origin: Earth
- Team affiliations: Advanced Idea Mechanics
- Partnerships: Destructor
- Abilities: Laser cannon Teleportation; Superhuman strength and durability

The Doomsday Man is a fictional character appearing in American comic books published by Marvel Comics. Primarily an enemy of Carol Danvers, the character exists within Marvel's main shared universe, known as the Marvel Universe. Created by writer Stan Lee and artist John Buscema, the character first appeared in Silver Surfer #13 (February 1970).

== Publication history ==
Doomsday Man was introduced in Silver Surfer #13 and reappeared in Ms. Marvel #3-4 in a two-part storyline that ended with it fusing with Professor Kerwin Korman, a villain who had previously appeared in Ms. Marvel #1-2 under the name the Destructor. The aggregate of Doomsday Man and Korman was subsequently featured in a story-arc that took place in The Avengers (vol. 3) #15-17 before making its final appearance to date in Ms. Marvel (vol. 2) #11-12.

== Fictional character biography ==
After the 1969 Apollo 11 Moon landing, the United States government commissions John Kronton to create an automaton that can assist mankind with exploring and colonizing other worlds. Carol Danvers is the overseer of the project. However, Danvers fears the robot's power, resulting in her arranging for it to be abandoned on a desolate island in the Pacific Ocean.

The robot (dubbed "Doomsday Man" by tabloids) activates and breaks free of its prison, taking with it a cobalt bomb. Learning of Doomsday Man's existence, the Silver Surfer attempts to destroy it and prevent the detonation of the cobalt bomb with the assistance of Doctor Kronton. Kronton reveals that he had secretly programmed Doomsday Man to awaken and threaten mankind, intending to stop it himself and fraudulently establish himself as a hero. The Surfer separates Doomsday Man from the cobalt bomb and attempts to trap it in a pit. When Kronton tries to help his creation climb back up to the surface, Doomsday Man swats him away, killing him. Doomsday Man loses its grip and falls deep underground, while the Surfer safely disposes of the cobalt bomb.

The Destructor on the cover of Ms. Marvel #4 (April 1977), art by Danny Cresp, Ed Hannigan and Frank Giacoia

A.I.M. acquires and gains control of Doomsday Man, which they attach to a rocket set for the Kennedy Space Center. Carol Danvers, now the superheroine Ms. Marvel, intercepts the projectile, causing it to crash land near the Florida cave where she had first become Ms. Marvel. Recommencing her battle with Doomsday Man, Ms. Marvel manages to deactivate it by attacking the weak point that had been secretly installed in the back of its head by Kronton. Ms. Marvel is then ambushed by Professor Kerwin Korman, a.k.a. the Destructor. Searching for the source of Ms. Marvel's powers, Korman stumbles onto and opens a spare energy core for the nearby Psyche-Magnitron, unleashing an explosive blast of radiation that launches Ms. Marvel out of the cave and fuses Korman with Doomsday Man.

A.I.M.'s leader, MODOK, eventually loses interest in Doomsday Man, which is abandoned beneath a warehouse in The Bronx. When the building is destroyed during an altercation involving A.I.M., the New Warriors, and the Avengers, Doomsday Man escapes. After concluding that Korman's usefulness as wetware is waning, it sets out to replace him with Ms. Marvel.

Doomsday Man captures Carol Danvers, who has since become Warbird, and states that it requires her to become complete. The Avengers, having tracked Warbird down, arrive and manage to damage Doomsday Man enough to incapacitate it and reveal the trapped Korman.

Doomsday Man is reacquired by A.I.M. and once again placed in storage after the organization fails to control the robot or replicate its fusion with Korman. After spending months in a vegetative state, Korman awakens, assumes control of Doomsday Man's body, and embarks on a rampage, intent on murdering Carol Danvers (who has since returned to the Ms. Marvel moniker).

When Korman severely injures Araña, Ms. Marvel batters Doomsday Man with a car, tears it open, and nearly kills the exposed Korman, relenting at the last minute when the suicidal Korman whispers, "Heh... thank... you". Emergency services are able to stabilize Korman, who is later revealed to have been intentionally awakened and given control of Doomsday Man by a rogue faction of A.I.M.

== Powers and abilities ==
As it was constructed to be able to withstand and function in every conceivable environment, Doomsday Man is nigh-invulnerable and superhumanly strong. It also has a laser cannon mounted on its right arm and a "photonic nullifier" in its mouth. A.I.M. provided Doomsday Man with further armaments, including tachyon blasters attached to its head and arm and the power to teleport itself and others.

Kerwin Korman merging with it increased Doomsday Man's mental faculties, giving it a human-like mind and personality, as well as the ability to improvise. Korman himself is a genius inventor and engineer and, like Carol Danvers, was mutated into a human-Kree hybrid via exposure to the radiation emitted by the Psyche-Magnitron.
