= Super-Adaptoid =

Supervillain in Marvel comics

- The Super-Adaptoid (background) as depicted in Avengers #45 (October 1967). Art by John Buscema and Vincent Colletta.

Publication information
- Publisher: Marvel Comics
- First appearance: Tales of Suspense #82 (October 1966; as Adaptoid); Tales of Suspense #84 (December 1966; as Super-Adaptoid)
- Created by: Stan Lee; Gene Colan; Jack Kirby

In-story information
- Alter ego: Super-Adaptoid
- Team affiliations: A.I. Army; A.I.M. Heavy Metal; Phalanx
- Notable aliases: Adaptoid, Cyborg-Sinister, Fixer, Supreme Adaptoid, Alessandro Brannex
- Abilities: Ability to mimic superhuman abilities

The Super-Adaptoid is the name of several characters appearing in American comic books published by Marvel Comics. The character has appeared in over five decades of Marvel continuity and featured in other Marvel-endorsed products such as animated television series and merchandise such as trading cards.

== Publication history ==
The original version appeared in Tales of Suspense #82 (October 1966), and was created by Stan Lee, Jack Kirby and Gene Colan. A second version appeared in Web of Spider-Man #99 (April 1993), created by Tom DeFalco and Terry Kavanagh. Other iterations have also appeared, being "Batch 13" in Fantastic Force #4 (February 1995), created by Tom Brevoort and Pino Rinaldi, and the "Ultra-Adaptoid", in Super-Villain Team-Up: MODOK's Eleven #1 (September 2008), being created by Fred Van Lente and Francis Portela.

== Fictional character biography ==
=== Original version ===
The original model (simply known as the Adaptoid) debuted in the Tales of Suspense title, being created by the criminal scientific organization A.I.M. An android containing a shard of the Cosmic Cube artifact, the Adaptoid is programmed to defeat the hero Captain America, infiltrating the Avengers' headquarters while impersonating various characters (such as Edwin Jarvis and Bucky Barnes), and then copies the stand-out fighting abilities and respective traits of several Avengers (Goliath, Hawkeye, Wasp, and Captain America himself), as the "Super-Adaptoid". After a long battle, the android flees after incorrectly believing that Captain America has been killed.

The Super-Adaptoid takes underground near the Xavier Institute and is unintentionally awakened by an optic blast from Cyclops. The Adaptoid leaves his hideout and sees the X-Men ice skating. He then recalls that he has another mission: to transform others into Adaptoids like himself, so he begins his attempt with the X-Men. They refuse and a fight breaks out. As the battle drags on, Mimic (having been asked to leave the X-Men) watches from a distance and sees how powerful the Adaptoid was. The Adaptoid soon defeats the X-Men and is then approached by Mimic, who offers to become an Adaptoid. During the process, Mimic has a change of heart after learning that he will lose his free will and battles the Adaptoid. During the battle, the Adaptoid unsuccessfully tries to copy the powers that Mimic had copied from the X-Men. Mimic then devises a plan and tries to mimic the Adaptoid's abilities, causing feedback which makes both of them lose their powers. As Mimic is rescued by the X-Men, the Adaptoid falls into a river below.

The Super-Adaptoid later attacks Captain America during a charity event involving the Avengers, after copying the abilities of Thor, Iron Man, and Hercules. He is tricked into using all his powers at once, overloading himself. The Adaptoid is featured in the Iron Man title reactivated by Jarr and Tyrr as a servant. After a battle where Iron Man defeats the Adaptoid, the android evolved into the metal-based Cyborg-Sinister, attacking Stark Industries which resulted in another confrontation with Iron Man which ends with the android being seemingly destroyed. The Adaptoid reforms in the Captain Marvel title, and after a brief battle with Iron Man follows the hero to Avengers Mansion, where the character battles the team and Captain Marvel (Mar-Vell). Mar-Vell tricks the Adaptoid into copying the nega-bands, which act as a portal to the Negative Zone. By striking the Adaptoid's nega-bands together, Mar-Vell banishes him to the Negative Zone.

The Super-Adaptoid is retrieved in the Marvel Two-in-One title, and used unsuccessfully by villains Annihilus and Blastaar against the Thing and the Avengers in the Negative Zone. The Adaptoid reappears in the Avengers title. Revealed to be stored at Avengers Mansion when the Masters of Evil attacked, the Adaptoid disguises himself as the Fixer, overpowering and changing places with his victim to be the android's former confinement tube at Avengers Island. Super-Adaptoid later forms the team Heavy Metal, sending them to attack the Avengers. While the heroes are distracted, the Adaptoid summons Kubik to copy his powers and become the all-powerful Supreme Adaptoid. Although successful, the Super-Adaptoid is tricked into shutting down by Captain America and its Cosmic Cube shard is removed.

The android poses as "Alessandro Brannex" during various titles. With MODAM as an enforcer, Brannex is the C.E.O. of the terrorist organization A.I.M. on the Boca Caliente island country. While making A.I.M. into a public friendly company, Brannex tries to personally show Captain America of this legal change, and tries to get rid of Iron Man to finish a potential nuclear weapons deal. His impersonation is revealed during Superia's assassination to which the Adaptoid regenerated itself. On the Adaptoid-inhabited Boca Caliente, Alessandro's A.I.M. fraction is behind MODOK's resurrection. The Adaptoid reveals itself during a confrontation with the Red Skull but is caught in the recreated Cosmic Cube's reality-warping ability and is presumed destroyed.

The Super-Adaptoid appears in the limited series Annihilation Conquest: Quasar, and is revealed to be a warrior in the employ of the Phalanx under Ultron's control. Claiming he left Earth after becoming disgusted with humanity's chaotic nature, the Adaptoid attempts to destroy Phyla-Vell, Moondragon, and Adam Warlock.

During the "Iron Man 2020" storyline, the Super-Adaptoid appears as a member of the A.I. Army.

In Spider-Boy, Taskmaster steals Super-Adaptoid's right hand from a helicopter despite interference from Captain America and Spider-Boy. Shannon Stillwell reverse-engineers the Super-Adaptoid technology and creates Toy Soldier, who resembles an action figure and possesses the abilities of all of the Avengers. It initially battles Spider-Boy under Killionaire's control before becoming an ally to him.

=== Other models ===
There have been several Super-Adaptoid models:

- A model of Super-Adaptoid was provided as a field agent of the New Enforcers against Spider-Man. This Super-Adaptoid is ultimately used by the crime boss Blood Rose intentionally to affect the other mechanical teammates.
- Batch 13 is an Adaptoid in A.I.M.'s possession. Breaking out of its containment unit and escaping to New York City, it copies the various powers/abilities of Captain America and the Fantastic Force. As it was imitating powers, Batch 13 breaks down after copying Psi-Lord's psycho armor.
- Several Adaptoids can be seen on Boca Caliente, fooling several Avengers (Black Widow and Hercules). During the Cosmic Cube recreation, an Adaptoid (having been impressed by Captain America's heroic nature) ends the threat by transforming into a containment chamber for the Cube's reality-warping energy.
- An Ultra-Adaptoid appears in the limited series Super-Villain Team-Up: MODOK's 11. Created by A.I.M. to infiltrate MODOK's group of supervillains, the Ultra-Adaptoid has no independent will and is remotely controlled. Courtesy of a satellite relay, the Ultra-Adaptoid has access to dozens of powers, but is destroyed after being released from A.I.M. control.
- Avengers-themed Adaptoids from an alternate reality are used by the Scientist Supreme to combat the Avengers.
- Ultra Living Brain once created a Sinister Six-themed Super-Adaptoid who fought Spider-Man.

=== Other identity users ===
There have been characters who have gained the powers of the Super-Adaptoid:

- The terrorist organization Hydra converts Yelena Belova into a Super-Adaptoid cyborg to battle the New Avengers. Belova is defeated when the powers "copied" from the Sentry cause her the same psychological problems.
- Norman Osborn is given the Super-Adaptoid abilities by his followers to replace his lack of the Iron Patriot armor and his disinclination to return to his old Green Goblin role, absorbing the powers of the Avengers, the New Avengers, and the Dark Avengers. He is defeated when the Avengers and the New Avengers struck him all at once, the multiple powers working against each other and causing him to collapse into a coma.
- During the "One World Under Doom" storyline, Mad Thinker utilizes an armor derived from the Super-Adaptoid technology, which gives him the abilities of his Masters of Evil teammates Dreadknight, Madcap, and Mister Hyde.

== Powers and abilities ==
The original iteration is an artificial construct created by A.I.M., and courtesy of a shard of the Cosmic Cube artifact, the machine was capable of mimicking the powers and skills of numerous super beings. The Super-Adaptoid's powers extend to specific weapons and equipment, such as Captain America's shield, Iron Man's armor, Hawkeye's bow and arrows, and Thor's mystical hammer Mjolnir. The Super-Adaptoid possesses exceptional artificial intelligence, but limited imagination and an inability to understand the human condition has led to defeat. The shard was eventually removed by the cosmic entity Kubik. The two later versions, while capable of mimicking multiple foes, have been defeated when attacked by groups of meta-humans simultaneously, being unable to process the sudden surge in information.

== Other versions ==
- An alternate timeline version of the Super-Adaptoid appears in Spider-Man 2099.
- An alternate universe version of the Super-Adaptoid appears in "Heroes Reborn". This version was initially used by Loki before gaining sentience and becoming the heroic Amazo-Maxi-Woman.
- An alternate universe version of the Super-Adaptoid appears in Spider-Gwen. This version, also known as Project Green, is a member of the S.I.L.K. organization.

== In other media ==
=== Television ===
- The Super-Adaptoid appears in the "Captain America" segment of The Marvel Super Heroes, voiced by Vern Chapman and Carl Banas.
- The Super-Adaptoid makes non-speaking cameo appearances in X-Men: The Animated Series.
- The Super-Adaptoid appears in Avengers Assemble. This version is a nanotechnology-based android created by Justin Hammer in an attempt to join the Iron Skull's Cabal, and is utilized by MODOK and Ultron. Additionally, the Supreme Adaptoid appears as the Scientist Supreme's form fused with three other Adaptoids.
- Two Super-Adaptoids appear in Marvel Future Avengers.
- The Super-Adaptoid appears in M.O.D.O.K., voiced by Jon Daly. This version was created to serve as a butler and van for the titular character's family. The Super-Adaptoid seeks to impress MODOK and makes several attempts to betray the latter, only to be defeated and reset each time.

=== Video games ===
- The Super-Adaptoid appears as the final boss of The Amazing Spider-Man: Web of Fire.
- The Super-Adaptoid appears as a non-playable character (NPC) in Marvel: Contest of Champions.
- The Super-Adaptoid appears as a playable character in Lego Marvel Super Heroes 2.
- The Super-Adaptoid appears as the final boss of the Marvel's Avengers DLC "Taking A.I.M.".

=== Miscellaneous ===
In 2023, the Super-Adaptoid received an action figure as part of the Marvel Legends line.

== See also ==
- Amazo, a DC Comics supervillain with similar superpowers
