= Marvel's Avengers (video game) =

2020 video game

- Developer: Crystal Dynamics (Note: Additional work by Eidos-Montréal, Crystal Northwest, Crystal Southwest, and Nixxes Software)
- Publishers: Square Enix (2020–2022); Crystal Dynamics (2022–2023)
- Directors: Morgan W. Gray; Shaun Escayg
- Designers: Michael Brinker; Philippe Therien
- Artists: Brenoch Adams; Josh Bapst
- Writers: Nicole Martinez; Shaun Escayg; John Stafford
- Composer: Bobby Tahouri
- Engine: Foundation Engine
- Platforms: PlayStation 4; Stadia; Windows; Xbox One; PlayStation 5; Xbox Series X/S
- Release: PS4, Stadia, Windows, Xbox One; 4 September 2020; PS5, Xbox Series X/S; 18 March 2021
- Genres: Action-adventure, beat 'em up
- Modes: Single-player, multiplayer

Marvel's Avengers is a 2020 action-adventure game developed by Crystal Dynamics and originally published by Square Enix. Based on the Marvel Comics superhero team the Avengers, the plot follows Inhuman teenager Kamala Khan, who gains superpowers during A-Day, a celebratory day for the Avengers, which ends in tragedy following a terrorist attack. Blamed for the disaster, the Avengers disband and allow science corporation A.I.M. to take their place. Five years later, when A.I.M. threatens to eliminate all Inhuman individuals, Kamala embarks on a quest to reassemble the Avengers to combat this new enemy.

Marvel's Avengers is played from a third-person perspective and has both single-player and multiplayer modes; it features an online co-op mode, allowing players to assemble a team of heroes of their own. The initial roster consisted of Khan / Ms. Marvel, Tony Stark / Iron Man, Steve Rogers / Captain America, Bruce Banner / Hulk, Thor, and Natasha Romanoff / Black Widow, with more characters being added in free post-launch updates, which also added story expansions and new regions to be explored. Each hero possesses a variety of costume customization features, as well as the capacity to upgrade their powers and abilities using a skill tree.

Marvel's Avengers was released for PlayStation 4, Stadia, Windows, and Xbox One on 4 September 2020. It was also released for PlayStation 5 and Xbox Series X/S on 18 March 2021 (with PlayStation 4 and Xbox One players able to upgrade for free). The game received mixed reviews upon release, with critics praising its story and combat, but criticizing its repetition, lack of substantial content, technical issues, and release model. Despite strong initial sales, Marvel's Avengers was a commercial disappointment, only selling 3 million copies. Support from Crystal Dynamics for the game ended in September 2023, with it being delisted from digital storefronts in the same month.

== Gameplay ==
Marvel's Avengers is a third-person, action-adventure game. It features an original story with single-player and co-operative gameplay. The game features a combat system chaining attacks, dodges, abilities, skills and elements during a combat phase. The game can be played offline through single-player or online with up to four people during certain aspects of the game. The game features customization options including abilities and costumes, which can be upgraded using a skill tree. Costumes have been sourced from "all corners of the Marvel universe" and can be earned in-game or bought separately as downloadable content. Players are able to receive free updates containing new regions and characters.

== Synopsis ==
=== Characters ===
Marvel's Avengers features a roster of characters from the Marvel Universe. The initial roster of playable heroes consists of:

- Natasha Romanoff / Black Widow (Laura Bailey),
- Steve Rogers / Captain America (Jeff Schine)
- Tony Stark / Iron Man (Nolan North)
- Bruce Banner / Hulk (Troy Baker / Darin De Paul)
- Kamala Khan / Ms. Marvel (Sandra Saad).
- Thor Odinson (Travis Willingham)

Following the game's initial release, more superheroes were made available via free downloadable content:

- Kate Bishop / Hawkeye II (Ashly Burch), added in December 2020
- Clint Barton / Hawkeye (Giacomo Gianniotti), added in March 2021
- T'Challa / Black Panther (Christopher Judge), added in August 2021
- Peter Parker / Spider-Man (Sean Chiplock), added in November 2021 for the PlayStation 4 & 5 versions,
- Jane Foster / The Mighty Thor (Zehra Fazal), added in June 2022
- Bucky Barnes / Winter Soldier (Scott Porter), added in November 2022

Opposing the Avengers is the corporation Advanced Idea Mechanics (A.I.M.). Within the game's narrative, superheroes have been outlawed while A.I.M. takes the Avengers' place in society as a peacekeeping force, promising to find a cure for what is dubbed the "Inhuman Disease". A.I.M. is headed by Monica Rappaccini (Jolene Andersen) and George Tarleton / MODOK (Usman Ally), who is severely mutated as a result of the events of A-Day. Other villains include Emil Blonsky / Abomination (Jamieson Price), Tony Masters / Taskmaster (Walter Gray IV), and Loki (Travis Willingham). The game's DLC missions introduce more villains, namely the Super-Adaptoid, Lyle Getz (Darin De Paul), Maestro (Darin De Paul), Ulysses Klaue / Klaw (Steve Blum), and Brock Rumlow / Crossbones (Fred Tatasciore).

Non-playable supporting characters in the game include Tony Stark's proprietary A.I. J.A.R.V.I.S. (Harry Hadden-Paton), Hank Pym (Danny Jacobs), Phil Sheldon (Walter Gray IV), Nick Fury (Charles Parnell), Maria Hill (Jennifer Hale), Dum Dum Dugan (Greg Baldwin), Jimmy Woo (Aleks Le), Dante Pertuz (Michael Johnston), Cerise (Cherry Thompson), Yusuf Khan (Brian George), Justin Hammer (Nicolas Roye), Lucky the Pizza Dog, Shuri (Erica Luttrell), Okoye (Debra Wilson), Zawavari (Dave Fennoy), Liz Allan (Elizabeth Grullon), and Mark Raxton (James Arnold Taylor).

=== Plot ===
==== Main story ====
11-year-old Kamala Khan attends a celebration event called "Avengers Day" which unveils the Avengers' second headquarters in San Francisco and their own Helicarrier called the Chimera. The ceremony is interrupted by a terrorist attack led by Taskmaster, which leads to the Chimera's Terrigen Crystal-powered core exploding and Steve Rogers' apparent death. San Francisco is destroyed and blanketed by Terrigen Mist in the aftermath, which causes numerous individuals, including Kamala, to involuntarily manifest superhuman powers as Inhumans. Blamed for the tragedy known as "A-Day", the Avengers disband and a company named A.I.M. rises to power.

Five years later at her home in Jersey City, Kamala discovers damaged video footage which seemingly implicate a scientist named George Tarleton in Rogers' death. She attempts to meet a contact from an anti-A.I.M. resistance movement known as "Tiny Dancer", but is captured by Tarleton and A.I.M.'s scientist Monica Rappaccini. Kamala escapes and travels to Utah to find the resistance's base of operations. Her search leads her to the Chimera's damaged remains in which she finds the Hulk who attacks her before reverting into Bruce Banner. She convinces him to assist her in proving the Avengers' innocence. Traveling to a former S.H.I.E.L.D. compound to retrieve J.A.R.V.I.S., the two are confronted by A.I.M. and one of their operatives, Emil Blonsky. Hulk defeats him before he and Kamala return to the Chimera to reactivate J.A.R.V.I.S. and set out to reunite the Avengers. While they find Tony Stark at his family estate, he bears a grudge against Banner because his testimony of A-Day incriminated the Avengers. Upon learning of Kamala's evidence, Stark agrees to join them and works to restore the Chimera.

During their search for parts to help Stark, Kamala and Banner stumble upon the Ant Hill, an Inhuman sanctuary and the resistance's headquarters run by Hank Pym. While assisting them, Kamala disobeys orders and attempts to raid an A.I.M. facility alone to save Inhuman prisoners, but is captured. While in custody, she learns Rappaccini's efforts to make an Inhuman cure are unsuccessful, leading Tarleton to prioritize the manufacturing of Adaptoid androids. Natasha Romanoff drops her cover within A.I.M. and infiltrates the facility. She captures Rappaccini, frees Kamala, and reveals her identity as "Tiny Dancer". Banner attempts to interrogate Rappaccini about the Adaptoid laboratory's whereabouts, but the latter resists before A.I.M. forces attack the Chimera and retrieve her. Witnessing the attack, Thor Odinson intervenes and re-joins the Avengers. J.A.R.V.I.S. restores the footage which shows Rogers ordering Tarleton to seal him inside so he can destroy the Chimera's reactor, apparently causing the explosion. Believing A-Day really was their fault, the Avengers disband again.

While reviewing the interrogation footage, Kamala realizes A.I.M.'s Adaptoid laboratory is located off-world in a satellite called Ambrosia. She relays this information to the Avengers and rallies them with a heartfelt speech. Stark upgrades his suit to achieve space travel and infiltrates the satellite where he discovers Rogers is alive and placed in suspended animation so Rappaccini could harvest his blood to power the Adaptoids and covertly accelerate Tarleton's mutation. Thor comes to their rescue and they return to the Chimera, where Rogers reveals that he destroyed the reactor because it was unearthing an unidentified object underneath the bay that threatened to destabilize the San Andreas Fault and destroy California. Meanwhile, Tarleton discovers that Rappaccini's serum, while seemingly keeping him alive, has deliberately induced his mutations and injects her with it in retaliation.

Reassembled, the Avengers deduce that Rappaccini hired Taskmaster to hijack the Chimera and steal the Terrigen Crystal, which unearthed the buried object in the bay. They learn that Tarleton, now calling himself "M.O.D.O.K.", plans to exterminate Inhumans around the world and commit suicide afterwards. The Avengers storm his fortress, but M.O.D.O.K. activates the object—a massive Kree Sentry—and overpowers them. Kamala unexpectedly grows to giant size, destroys the Kree Sentry, and sends M.O.D.O.K falling into the bay. After her recovery, Kamala returns home to her father Yusuf who allows her to discreetly join the Avengers.

In a mid-credits scene, Rappaccini becomes A.I.M.'s new leader, the Scientist Supreme, while the Kree Sentry's remains launches a pod into space. In a post-credits scene, Maria Hill rallies the Avengers to undermine A.I.M.'s activities.

==== Side stories ====
Throughout the story progression, six side missions can be unlocked.

- Kamala and Banner learn that Blonsky attempts to create a gamma army by transforming the people of a small town in Utah with gamma bombs around. While J.A.R.V.I.S. deactivates the gamma bomb timers, the Hulk defeats Blonsky, then sends him and his A.I.M. troops to the authorities.
- Romanoff leads a rescue ops to save the former A.I.M. scientist she befriended and is currently having trouble defecting to the resistance side safely. Once the scientists are rescued, Romanoff's second leading mission is to infiltrate A.I.M.'s icy underwater base which contains the data of those who were present in A-Day and are currently Inhumans like Kamala.
- Thor learns that an imposter assembled a cult of former A.I.M. agents known as "Woken" and is using them to create a synthetic Bifröst bridge. As the Avengers stop the unstable Bifröst, the fake Thor, who turns out to be his brother, Loki Laufeyson, escapes.
- Rogers leads an infiltration to an A.I.M. space station to broadcast the truth about A.I.M.'s true nature and confirmation of the Avengers' return, then raids A.I.M.'s bases at New Jersey alongside resistance and S.H.I.E.L.D. troops led by Pym and Hill.
- As Taskmaster has an ongoing contract with A.I.M. for five years, he collects data and uploads them to his contractor. However, as he is defeated by the Avengers, the last piece of data which Taskmaster was about to upload to A.I.M. has been destroyed by Hill, securing his arrest under S.H.I.E.L.D.'s custody.
- "Reigning Supreme" campaign's mission can only be unlocked after finishing the tasked side-missions. Once the campaign is cleared, a cutscene shows Kamala being officially made an Avenger.

=== Story expansions ===
==== Taking A.I.M. ====
After a series of tachyon storms occur across the world, the Avengers investigate and discover their relation to A.I.M.'s experiments. While investigating an A.I.M. facility, they encounter Kate Bishop, Clint Barton's protégé and ex-Avenger-in-training. Meeting with her at a S.H.I.E.L.D. outpost, the Avengers learn that Barton had been captured by A.I.M. while investigating Nick Fury's disappearance and its relation to the tachyon storms. Capturing A.I.M. scientist Lyle Getz, they interrogate him and learn that Rappaccini is attempting to master time travel. After Rogers offers her a chance to join the Avengers, Bishop leads the team on a raid, during which they discover Rappaccini is in contact with a future version of herself and that Barton apparently works with her.

Consulting Pym, the Avengers agree to travel back in time to rescue Barton and end Rappaccini's experiments before they tear reality apart. With help from the resistance, they construct their own time gate and go back to before Barton initially went through A.I.M.'s portal and rescue him, whereupon he reveals that he was attempting to contact Fury, who is with the future Rappaccini, and that they are working together to avert a future apocalypse. Agreeing to let Barton travel to the future, the Avengers return to the present to ensure he succeeds and takes control of Rappaccini's time gate after defeating a Super-Adaptoid created by her future self. Once Barton returns to the present, Bishop destroys the gateway and agrees to join the Avengers as a full-time member.

While debriefing the Avengers, Barton reveals that Rappaccini was trying to thwart a Kree invasion with Fury's help. After the latter realized the battle was a lost cause, he sent Barton to the past to prepare the Avengers for the invasion before it occurs. Before he can tell the Avengers more, Barton suddenly falls unconscious due to the effects of time travel.

==== Future Imperfect ====
Several weeks after falling into a coma, Barton dreams about his future self searching for Fury and coming across a time gate built by Pym. Hawkeye then suddenly awakens and formally rejoins the Avengers as they resume their mission to save the future. Barton goes to his home in Brooklyn to retrieve an essential package, only to find that most of his belongings have been stolen by the Watchdogs, A.I.M.'s hired terrorists, to lure Barton into a trap and capture him. The Avengers recover Barton's belongings before meeting with Pym at a S.H.I.E.L.D. outpost. Barton gives him a SIM card to analyze, discovering it contains information about tachyons' ability to alter time.

Pym modifies a Quinjet to travel through time so that the Avengers can go to the future and find Fury. Amidst their search, they encounter a group of S.H.I.E.L.D. agents besieged by A.I.M. robots and save them. Learning the robots serve someone called the "Supreme Leader", the Avengers avoid them as they make their way to another S.H.I.E.L.D. hideout. There, they try to put together the clues they collected to locate Fury, but are forced to fend off an attack by the future Taskmaster. After defeating his troops, the future Barton appears and offers to help the present-day Avengers change the future out of guilt for refusing to help when the Kree invasion occurred and inadvertently allowing the other Avengers to be killed. With his help, the Avengers learn Fury's last known location—Substation 99—and go there to investigate. However, they encounter Maestro, this timeline's Banner who was driven mad with power after absorbing excess radiation from the nuclear fallout that destroyed most of humanity. Maestro reveals that he knows about the Avengers' plan to alter the future and attempts to stop them, but is ultimately defeated.

Venturing further into Maestro's territory, future and present-day Barton find Fury, Rappaccini, numerous S.H.I.E.L.D. and A.I.M. agents, and Kree Sentries frozen in time by the Cosmic Cube, which Rappaccini built to help defeat the Kree. However, the cube trapped her and those around her in a time-bubble while the rest of the world collapsed into chaos. With no hope of rescuing Fury, future Barton asks his present-day self to never give up on the Avengers so that this future does not happen. Barton vows to do so, abandoning his retirement plans as he and the other Avengers return to the present.

==== Cosmic Cube ====
Following the Avengers' venture into the future, a model A.I.M. robot assembles the team for a briefing to stop Rappaccini from using the cube's unstable power on her "Project Omega", which would bring about the events that future Barton warned of. When Rappaccini's machine becomes more unstable, she uses the cube's power against the Avengers despite potentially threatening reality and Barton's warning. However, the future Barton arrives in the present and sacrifices himself to send him and Rappaccini into a void, leaving the cube behind. While mourning for the future Barton, the resistance, S.H.I.E.L.D., and the Avengers work to find the present Fury's whereabouts and properly use Project Omega to stop the impending Kree invasion. Later, the A.I.M. robot holds the cube while securing it, causing the latter to activate and affect another nearby robot.

==== War for Wakanda ====
Five years since the A-Day tragedy caused Wakanda to re-isolate from the world once again, T'Challa, the current king of his home country and the current Black Panther, leads his people into battle against invading A.I.M. forces and a private army led by Ulysses Klaue, a longtime enemy of the country whose father Fritz was killed trying to steal Wakanda's precious resource vibranium. After stopping an invasion led by Crossbones at Wakanda's shielded capital Birnin Zana, T'Challa and his sister Shuri work with the Avengers to investigate Klaue's connection to the emergence of corrupted Vibranium in Wakanda and around the world. T'Challa attempts to use Wakanda's Kimoyo network to locate Klaue, but the latter hijacks and damages it before capturing and killing Shuri's research team. T'Challa orders the Wakandans to evacuate to Birnin Zana before joining the Avengers in confronting Klaue at Azzuri's Temple, only for Klaue to destroy it.

Upon escaping and regrouping, the heroes learn Shuri intercepted a transmission between Klaue and another Rappaccini clone in which she reprimands Klaue for prioritizing seeking revenge for his father and destroying potentially valuable information in the temple before retracting A.I.M.'s support. In retaliation, Klaue and his army storm Wakanda's vibranium mound while A.I.M. attacks Birnin Zana. As the Avengers stop Klaue's army from corrupting the vibranium core, T'Challa fights Klaue in close combat, during which the latter falls into the vibranium chambers and transforms into a pure sound being. Now going by "Klaw", he and Crossbones overpower the heroes, forcing T'Challa and Shuri to redirect energy from Birnin Zana's shields to create a wavelength capable of weakening Klaw. Crossbones retreats while T'Challa and the Avengers defeat Klaw, who disintegrates. As Birnin Zana's shields are restored, T'Challa joins the Avengers in their fight against A.I.M. and passes the throne to Shuri, making her Queen-Regent of Wakanda.

==== Discordant Sound ====
Shuri discovers that Klaw survived his last encounter, even though weakened for the time being, and will always return many times to get revenge on Wakanda and the Avengers. With the help of Zawavari and Okoye, the Avengers immediately disperse Klaw and defend the Vibranium Mound.

==== With Great Power ====
While the Avengers continue their fight against A.I.M., Peter Parker and Liz Allan apply for internships with the company only to learn A.I.M. is torturing Inhumans to create weapons with help from Allan's family's company Allan Chemicals. Peter and Liz ask the Avengers for help with Peter becoming Spider-Man to help the heroes expose A.I.M., while Liz joins the resistance. It is revealed that Liz's half-brother Mark Raxton had been working undercover for his sister's sake to gather pieces of information for Spider-Man and the Avengers about A.I.M.'s dubious activities such as Spencer Smythe's downfall on siding with A.I.M. ever since the death of his son Alistair Smythe five years ago. With the evidence of A.I.M. and Smythe's crimes exposed and under investigation, Raxton uploads them to Daily Bugle and turns himself over to the authorities for testimony against A.I.M.. Shortly after gaining a new suit as a reserved Avengers member, Peter gets a phone call from Aunt May before he goes swinging across the city at night.

==== Return of Nick Fury ====
Following the Avengers' success in retrieving the Cosmic Cube from Rappaccini and preventing the Future Imperfect's timeline from happening, as well as their successful alliance with the Wakandan army, Fury resurfaces from the shadows and returns to lead S.H.I.E.L.D. once more.

==== The Mighty Jane Foster ====
While preparing their current missions in their home timeline, the Avengers unexpectedly encounters a female Thor, who is revealed to be Jane Foster from the alternate present timeline and was transported to the former's universe as the result of Rappaccini's tampering the tachyon affected her timeline as well.

She explains that in her timeline, the original Thor lost his left arm in presumably a previous battle instead and alternate Jane was diagnosed with cancer after A-Day, resulting in Thor retiring from his role and entrusting it to her to keep cancer in her on hold via Mjölnir after it chose her. Thus, the alternate Jane became part of the reassembled Avengers team in his stead. Because of Thor's action, his father Odin Borson goes mad due to outside forces and desecrates the Ten Realms into chaos. Before so, knowing that she will not be able to defeat Odin, she made a temporary truce with Loki, allowing him to kill Odin while he is off-guard on focusing his fight against Jane.

This outcome leads to Jane's involvement in the original universe when she and Loki were about to end a deal of their temporary alliance before the former is unexpectedly pulled by a tachyon anomaly that affected her universe. Jane of the prime universe, with whom she comes in contact, is revealed to be healthy because she was not present at A-Day.

==== No Rest for the Wicked ====
Kamala, Rogers, and Romanoff discover an unidentifiable energy reading at one of A.I.M.'s facilities. There, the Avengers discover a creature who turns out to be M.O.D.O.K., enclosed in a strange machine. They find out that due to their exploits against A.I.M., Rappaccini has become desperate to preserve it, and is now attempting to revive M.O.D.O.K. as a last-ditch effort to support A.I.M.

She attempts to fend off the Avengers once again, only to be defeated. But to their surprise, the real M.O.D.O.K. appears before her and transports himself and Rappaccini away before the Avengers can do anything. As the heroes return to their base, they are still doubting M.O.D.O.K.'s current situation while vowing to bring him and Rappaccini to justice.

==== The Winter Soldier ====
Having presumably died at the end of World War II during his time as Rogers' sidekick, Bucky Barnes was found and brainwashed by the Soviets' Red Room as a "Winter Soldier", who often put him on ice until new missions are given to him each year, particularly during a Cold War. Until the day during his time trained by Red Room, Barnes fell in love with Romanoff, who partially restored some of his humanity and memories. Unfortunately, when the Red Room caught them having a relationship "forbidden" to their rules, Barnes remains unfound, while Romanoff was eventually rescued by S.H.I.E.L.D., and became one of the founding members of the Avengers after Rogers was found on ice years later. Sometime later, Barnes eventually wakes up and escapes Red Room in the same year as A-Day occurred. For three years since Rogers' presumed death in A-Day, A.I.M., particularly Rappaccini acquired Red Room's assets to brainwash Barnes once more and experiment on him.

==== AIM Cloning Lab ====
Two years later after the Avengers re-assembled, and Rogers was found alive thanks to Kamala, the team is informed that M.O.D.O.K. is waiting for them at A.I.M.'s branch of the cloning lab, and learns that Rappaccini has escaped from his wrath once again. After being defeated by the Avengers, M.O.D.O.K. has learned the Kree's arrival is nearing, and shows them Barnes' exact location before he presumably dies. It is revealed that Barnes is also being put into similar station like how Rappaccini secretly did to Rogers in A.I.M.'s space station.

==== A Dark and Heavy Star ====
Thanks to M.O.D.O.K.'s presumed death that allows Avengers to find Barnes's exact location, Barnes is offered to join the Avengers to redeem himself, in exchange for helping him find a way to remove the brainwashing protocols from his head.

== Release ==
A teaser trailer was released on Marvel Entertainment's YouTube channel in January 2017 which announced the game. The game was under the working title The Avengers Project. More than two years later at E3 2019, Square Enix hosted a press conference that shared more details on the game, including a full trailer and release date. The 14-minute presentation showcased a trailer made from in-game footage, a brief description of the gameplay including characters, multiplayer and customization, and a preview of the actors behind the game. A playable demo was available to show floor attendees behind closed doors.

A closed beta was available for those who pre-ordered the game. This began 7 August and ran until 9 August for PlayStation 4. The closed beta came to Windows and Xbox One from 14 to 16 August, with an open beta for all PlayStation 4 users also being available during this weekend. A final open beta took place from 21 to 23 August for all launch platforms apart from Stadia.

Marvel's Avengers was originally set to release on PlayStation 4, Stadia, Windows, and Xbox One on 15 May 2020, but was pushed back to 4 September, to adjust and polish the game. The game was released in four editions; a Standard Edition, an Exclusive Digital Edition (only for PS4), a Deluxe Edition, and an Earth's Mightiest Edition, with the latter three editions being playable from 1 September, and the standard edition releasing on 4 September. The game released on the PlayStation 5 and Xbox Series X and Xbox Series S on 18 March 2021. PS4 and Xbox One players are entitled to a free upgrade.

Publishing rights for the Asian release of the game were handled by Bandai Namco Entertainment.

=== Post-release content ===
Following the initial release of the game, Crystal Dynamics developed several free downloadable content (DLC) packs adding new playable characters and missions that continue the game's story. In December of 2020, the first of these expansions was revealed to focus on Hawkeye (Kate Bishop). Later, in August, Spider-Man was announced as the second playable DLC character, exclusively to PlayStation. Crystal Dynamics studio head Scot Amos stated the exclusivity of Spider-Man came from Marvel and Sony's existing partnership, and clarified that he was meant to be the only console-exclusive character.

On 1 September, the third announced playable DLC character was Hawkeye (Kate Bishop). Kate's expansion, titled Operation: Kate Bishop – Taking A.I.M., was the first one to be released, on 8 December, after being delayed from its planned October release. The second expansion, Operation: Hawkeye – Future Imperfect, which patches Clint Barton as a playable character, was released on 18 March 2021. The third expansion, Operation: Black Panther – War for Wakanda, which added Black Panther to the game, was released on 17 August 2021. Hero Event: Spider-Man – With Great Power was released on 30 November 2021. Hero Event: The Mighty Thor was released on 28 June 2022, which adds Jane Foster version of Thor. Hero Event: Winter Soldier was released on 29 November 2022.

On 20 January 2023, Crystal Dynamics announced that all official support for Marvel's Avengers would end on 30 September and the game would be delisted from digital storefronts on 30 September 2023. Crystal Dynamics released the last content update on 31 March 2023.

=== Tie-in media and merchandise ===
==== Marvel's Avengers: Road to A-Day ====
Marvel Comics has published five tie-in prequel comics for the game in a collection called Marvel's Avengers: Road to A-Day. Each comic focuses on one of the five playable characters available at launch, excluding Ms. Marvel. The first comic to be released was Marvel's Avengers: Iron Man #1 on 11 December 2019, followed by Marvel's Avengers: Thor #1 on 8 January 2020, Marvel's Avengers: Hulk #1 on 5 February 2020, Marvel's Avengers: Captain America #1 on 18 March 2020, and concluding with Marvel's Avengers: Black Widow #1 on 25 March 2020.

==== Tie-in books ====
Titan Books published two tie-in books for the game on 1 September 2020. The first book, titled Marvel's Avengers: The Extinction Key was written by Greg Keyes, is a prequel focused on the events that take place prior to the A-Day, which also sets the game's events in motion. The novel follows the Avengers as they try to prevent an ancient organization called the Zodiac from acquiring an infinitely powerful weapon capable of warping the very fabric of time and space – the Zodiac Key. The Extinction Key also introduces the game's versions of Doctor Strange and Brother Voodoo, as well as specific members of S.H.I.E.L.D. The second book, Marvel's Avengers: The Art of the Game contains concept art, storyboards and artist commentary, an intimate study of the Avengers, plus a detailed view at the different environments and missions in the game.

==== Further merchandise ====
Funko released a set of Pop! Vinyl figurines based on the playable characters in the game that are available at launch, in addition to figures based on Taskmaster and Abomination. Black Widow received a glow-in-the-dark chase variant, with the stock of this variant being at a rate of one in every six Black Widow figures. Captain America, Thor, Iron Man, and Hulk also received alternate designs exclusive to certain retailers, with the first two being glow-in-the-dark variants. The designs for the characters were also loosely adapted for Lego Marvel Avengers sets releasing in 2020, though the events depicted are not from the game itself. There was also the release of several Hasbro figures to tie-in to the game. This includes 5-inch basic figures of Thor, Iron Man, Hulk, Taskmaster, Abomination, Captain America and Ms. Marvel as well as 6-inch Marvel Legends figures of Captain America, Iron Man, Ms. Marvel, Hulk and Abomination.

== Reception ==
=== Critical response ===
Reception

Aggregate scores
Aggregator	Score
Metacritic	PC: 68/100; PS4: 67/100; XONE: 66/100; PS5: 73/100
OpenCritic	39% recommend

Review scores
Publication	Score
Destructoid	6/10
Electronic Gaming Monthly	2/5
Game Informer	8.75/10
GameRevolution	3/5
GameSpot	7/10
GameStar	75/100
IGN	6/10
Shacknews	8/10
USgamer	2.5/5
VideoGamer.com	7/10

Marvel's Avengers received "mixed or average reviews" from critics, according to review aggregator website Metacritic. Fellow review aggregator OpenCritic assessed that the game received fair approval, being recommended by 39% of critics.

Destructoid summarized its 6/10 review by calling the game "Slightly above average or simply inoffensive. Fans of the genre should enjoy it a bit, but a fair few will be left unfulfilled." Shacknews praised the campaign and unique character abilities, but noted the "convoluted and uninspired" menus and bug issues. USgamer scored the game 2.5/5 stars and wrote: "If Marvel's Avengers was just the single-player story campaign, it would be amazing. There, Crystal Dynamics sells you on its version of the Avengers and introduces the charming and endearing Ms. Marvel to players everywhere. Combat has depth to it, and each hero truly feels distinct. Unfortunately, the endgame is where our heroes falter, with broken matchmaking, rough options in terms of progression, and endlessly reused environments and enemies."

Electronic Gaming Monthly said "Marvel's Avengers squanders the potential of what might have been a fun superhero romp by grafting on an annoying, overly repetitive games-as-a-service component. Playing as the cast of heroes offers decent thrills, and the campaign tells an enjoyable enough story, but odds are good you'll get bored long before you grind your way to the top." Game Informer gave the game an 8.75/10, writing: "Developer Crystal Dynamics delivers a powerful superhero showcase that taps into each Avenger's unique abilities to light up the battlefield in thrilling ways, but when the dust settles, it slows down to show a softer, human side that is every bit as engaging, placing a character you wouldn't expect in the central role." IGN gave the game 6/10, praising its combat, superhero flavor and campaign, but criticizing its technical issues, loot system and recycled, repetitive end-game.

=== Post-release ===
In the weeks following its launch, Avengers saw a large player drop due to audiences frustrated at the game's problems, such as bugs, repetitive gameplay, and lack of content in the base game. One update included a patch that fixed over a thousand player-reported issues in the game. Peter Morics of Screen Rant reported around 1,190 players on Steam during a weekend in November 2020 – a 96% decline since the game's debut. Gene Park of The Washington Post noted that only over a thousand players were playing Avengers on PC, which he described as "an early and worrying symptom of a dying live service game." The dwindling number of players, which Paul Tassi of Forbes observed as falling below 500 players at one point, have begun causing problems with matchmaking multiplayer games on PC.

Mike Fahey of Kotaku noted that players such as himself were growing bored with the game's repetitive features and lack of content, saying, "We need new content. New enemies. New game mechanics... The initial excitement over playing beloved superheroes has dulled, thanks to a lack of variety in late-game content". After receiving a statement from Crystal Dynamics, he advised players, "There are plenty of other games out there to play, and as much as I would love to engage my superhero fantasies on a daily basis, nonstop for weeks on end, it's not currently happening in Marvel's Avengers." Thomas Carroll of Comic Book Resources felt that the game had "plenty of bugs and crashes and a severe lack of content and customisation" alongside a large $60 price tag for a live-service game. He believed that Square Enix relied too much on the established Marvel brand in marketing, instead of "bothering to create a quality experience people would pay for once, then continue to pay for whenever new content was released." Paul Tassi enjoyed his initial experiences with the game, but over time grew frustrated over the game's bugs and underwhelming, grind-heavy loot system, concluding that it was "too broken to effectively play right now." Although Gene Park commended Crystal Dynamics for listening to feedback and implementing fixes, he felt the game's lack of content in the base game highlighted that it "didn't need to be a live service game, and it's become increasingly clear that it shouldn't have been in the first place."

In September 2021, Crystal Dynamics and Square Enix introduced XP boost, which can only be purchased through real-world money. XP boost allows players to gain more experience points for a short period of time, allowing them to level up faster. This move followed an update in March 2021, which altered the progression system to make the leveling-up process take significantly longer than it did when the game first launched. These changes drew ire from both the community and gaming journalists, especially as Square Enix had previously declared in 2019 that the game's microtransactions would only be redeemable for cosmetics and customization items and would not be used to create a pay-to-win system. Crystal Dynamics removed the XP boost from the in-game marketplace one month later, on 3 November.

==== Story expansions ====
The Kate Bishop expansion was praised for its gameplay, voice work, and story, but some felt the added content was lacking. Fahey stated, "It's not her powers and abilities that make Kate Bishop great in Marvel's Avengers. It's a combination of [whoever] is writing the game's hero banter and the voice acting of Ashly Burch. Burch is a sassy voice actor given incredibly sassy superhero banter and she just eats it up." Dave Trumbore of Collider felt it was a "too-short introductory outing" for Kate, whom he described as "[bringing] an energy on par with Kamala Khan's youthful spirit and Tony Stark's sharp wit to the team, though it's her tool kit of melee/ranged/teleporting skills that are a cut above on the battlefield." Tassi was "deeply impressed" by the update's expansion on the campaign, voice work, and satisfying gameplay as Kate, but noted that this would do little to expand the game's current player base unless a large-scale expansion were added.

=== Sales ===
The beta of Avengers was the most downloaded beta in PlayStation history. According to Square Enix, there were over 6 million beta players and more than 27 million hours playing in beta.

In the United Kingdom, Marvel's Avengers was the best-selling retail game during its first week on sale. In the United States, the game was the top-selling title for the month of September, and second-highest launch-month dollar sales of all-time for a superhero game behind Spider-Man. In Japan, the PlayStation 4 version sold 42,979 physical units within its first week on sale, making it the second-best-selling retail game of the week in the country. The game sold 3 million copies by November 2020.

Despite initial strong sales, Avengers failed to turn a profit for Square Enix, with the publisher reporting an estimated loss of $63 million for their latest fiscal period at the time. In November 2021, Square Enix president Yosuke Matsuda described the game as a commercial disappointment for the company. However, he affirmed that service games would be an important focus for the company in the future.

In March 2021, Avengers was the 9th best selling game on Xbox in the United States. As of June 2021, it was 9th in the top 10 best selling games of the last 12 months. Following the Black Panther expansion in September 2021, the game returned to the top 10 of the UK video game chart for two weeks. It was the 13th most downloaded game in the United States and Canada and the 16th in Europe on PlayStation 5 that same month.

=== Awards ===
At the Golden Joystick Awards in 2020, Sandra Saad won "best performer" for her role as Kamala Khan in Avengers.
