= M.O.D.O.K. (TV series) =

2021 stop-motion adult animated series

- Genre: Animated sitcom; Science fiction; Superhero
- Created by: Jordan Blum; Patton Oswalt
- Based on: MODOK by: Stan Lee; Jack Kirby
- Directed by: Eric Towner; Alex Kamer
- Voices of: Patton Oswalt; Aimee Garcia; Ben Schwartz; Melissa Fumero; Wendi McLendon-Covey; Beck Bennett; Jon Daly; Sam Richardson
- Composer: Daniel Rojas
- Country of origin: United States
- Original language: English
- No. of episodes: 10

Production
- Executive producers: Brett Cawley; Robert Maitia; Grant Gish; Joe Quesada; Karim Zreik; Jeph Loeb; Jordan Blum; Patton Oswalt
- Producers: Paula Haifley; Whitney Loveall
- Editors: Chris Rogers; Jessica Shobe
- Running time: 23–25 minutes
- Production companies: 10k; Multiverse Cowboy; Stoopid Buddy Stoodios; Marvel Television

Original release
- Network: Hulu
- Release: May 21, 2021

Related
- Hit-Monkey

Marvel's M.O.D.O.K., or simply M.O.D.O.K., is an American stop-motion adult animated television series created by Jordan Blum and Patton Oswalt for Hulu, based on the Marvel Comics character MODOK. The series is produced by Marvel Television, with Blum and Oswalt serving as showrunners.

Oswalt stars as M.O.D.O.K. (Mental/Mobile/Mechanized Organism Designed Only for Killing), a supervillain struggling to handle his company and family. Aimee Garcia, Ben Schwartz, Melissa Fumero, Wendi McLendon-Covey, Beck Bennett, Jon Daly, and Sam Richardson also star. M.O.D.O.K. was officially announced with a series order at Hulu in February 2019, as part of a group of series based on Marvel characters that were intended to lead to a crossover special titled The Offenders, with it being produced by Marvel Television. Oversight of the series was moved to Marvel Studios in December 2019 when Marvel Television was folded into that company. The cast was announced in January 2020, with writing and recording completed later. The stop-motion animation for the series is provided by Stoopid Buddy Stoodios.

M.O.D.O.K.'s ten episodes were released on May 21, 2021, preceded by a tie-in comic book by Blum and Oswald, titled M.O.D.O.K.: Head Games. Upon its debut, the show was well received by critics, with praise going to the animation, writing, references from other Marvel properties, and the voice acting, particularly Oswalt's. The series was canceled after one season in May 2022.

== Premise ==
After spending years failing to gain control of the world and to defeat the superheroes he challenged along the way, M.O.D.O.K. is removed from his company A.I.M. after it falls into bankruptcy and is sold to the rival evil corporation GRUMBL (Just Be Evil), and begins to deal with his taunting family while facing a mid-life crisis.

== Cast and characters ==
=== Main ===
- Patton Oswalt as George Tarleton / M.O.D.O.K.:
  A floating robotic engineered head who is the former leader of A.I.M. and is obsessed with having control and conquering the world. He dislikes superheroes and his rival supervillains, believing he should be superior to them, before facing a mid-life crisis with his suburban New Jersey family.
  - Oswalt also voices Anomaly: The younger college-aged M.O.D.O.K. who becomes displaced in time and threatens to wipe out his future self's family so that their plans for world conquest can be secured.
  - Oswalt later appears as himself through a Snapchat filter on M.O.D.O.K. in the season one finale.
- Aimee Garcia as Jodie Ramirez-Tarleton:
  M.O.D.O.K.'s Judeo–Mexican American wife who questions his role as the superior supervillain. She decides to pursue a new career after running a mom-blog, earning money to support their family before becoming villainous herself, gaining attention from a superhero, which was said to go "beyond expectations for typical sitcom wives". In episode 8, she uses the pen name Jodie Ramirez-Modok.
- Ben Schwartz as Louis "Lou" Tarleton:
  M.O.D.O.K.'s socially awkward 12-year-old son who is different from the rest of his family, and does not have a care in the world. He claims his name stands for Lanky Organism Undeniably Irresistible and Syphilitic; the last word that he chose, he admits that he thought sounded cool. The character wears a blue sweatshirt as a nod to Schwartz voicing characters associated with that color in Rise of the Teenage Mutant Ninja Turtles, DuckTales, and Sonic the Hedgehog.
  - Schwartz also voices Lou's robotic duplicate and adoptive twin brother, with the pair being treated as the same person and collectively known as "The Lous."
- Melissa Fumero as Melissa Tarleton:
  M.O.D.O.K.'s 17-year-old daughter who shares her father's appearance. She is the most popular girl at her high school and wants to gain her father's approval as a supervillain. She is also openly bisexual. She claims her name stands for Mental Entity Living to Induce Seriously Sinister Anarchy, but M.O.D.O.K. named her after Melissa Etheridge.
- Wendi McLendon-Covey as Monica Rappaccini / Scientist Supreme: M.O.D.O.K.'s workplace arch-nemesis whom he is forced to work with.
- Beck Bennett as Austin Van Der Sleet:
  M.O.D.O.K.'s new boss in his twenties who is from GRUMBL, a large tech company that invests in and takes control of A.I.M., He is also revealed to be in allegiance to Hexus, the Living Corporation.
- Jon Daly as Super-Adaptoid:
  A robot who has high ambitions as an artist and hates being enslaved as M.O.D.O.K.'s servant. It is revealed in "O, Were Blood Thicker Than Robot Juice!" that he has betrayed the family on multiple occasions, only for them to reset him. Despite this, the family sometimes forgets he exists.
- Sam Richardson as Garfield "Gary" Garoldson:
  M.O.D.O.K.'s one armed loyal henchman who is constantly optimistic. He has a husband named Big Mike who is a trucker.

=== Guest ===
- Jon Hamm as Tony Stark / Iron Man: A superhero and the owner of Stark Industries.
- Nathan Fillion as Simon Williams / Wonder Man: A superhero and the owner of Williams Innovations.
- Whoopi Goldberg as Marion Pouncy / Poundcakes: A wrestler with super-strength.
- Bill Hader as:
  - The Leader: A supervillain with a large cranium and genius intellect.
  - Angar the Screamer: A former rocker turned supervillain with enhanced vocal chords that produce sonic sound.
  - Drake Shannon / Orb: The usually quiet bartender of the Bar with No Name.
- Kevin Michael Richardson as:
  - Dr. Nathaniel Essex / Mister Sinister: A supervillain and an enemy of the X-Men who specializes in mutant genetics.
  - Jerome Beachman / Mandrill: A supervillain and former scientist who was mutated into a mandrill hybrid. He is dating Armadillo's ex-wife.
  - David Cannon / Whirlwind: A supervillain who wears armor that grants aerokinesis.
- Meredith Salenger as Madame Masque: A supervillainess who wears a golden mask to hide her disfigured face.
- Zara Mizrahi as Carmilla Rappaccini: Monica's cloned teenage daughter who does not care much for her mother's work.
- Dustin Ybarra as Armadillo: A supervillain with enhanced toughened skin and claws that allow him to dig anywhere.
- Chris Parnell as Alvin Healy / Tenpin: A bowling-themed member of the Death-Throws who is equipped with exploding bowling pins.
- Eddie Pepitone as Bruno Horgan / Melter: A supervillain with enhanced heat powers.
- Jonathan Kite as Tatterdemalion: A homeless supervillain who is antagonized by Wonder Man.
- Alan Tudyk as Arcade: A circus-themed supervillain and the owner of Murderworld who kidnaps M.O.D.O.K's family while working with the Anomaly.

== Episodes ==
No.	Title	Directed by	Written by	Original release date
1	"If This Be... M.O.D.O.K.!"	Eric Towner and Alex Kamer	Jordan Blum and Patton Oswalt	May 21, 2021
George Tarleton, a.k.a. MODOK, is the leader of A.I.M. who is constantly challenged by his subordinate Monica Rappaccini and lives in the suburbs with his lifestyle vlogging wife Jodie, his awkward son Lou, his popular teenage daughter Melissa, and the depressed and under-appreciated Super-Adaptoid. As MODOK declares success over stealing Iron Man's boot, he fails to acknowledge Jodie's achievements. He later discovers that A.I.M. is losing money and Austin Van Der Sleet, the head of rival tech company GRUMBL, offers to buy them. MODOK is reluctant, but Austin wins him over with a pitch, However, MODOK discovers too late that he has lost control of A.I.M. To prevent his agents from getting laid off, MODOK tries to stop Austin from signing them away, but ends up accidentally controlling Jodie while she is having a meeting with Austin about expanding her business. MODOK is too late to stop Austin, but convinces him to have his agents keep their jobs. At dinner afterwards, Jodie tells MODOK that she wants a divorce.
2	"The M.O.D.O.K. That Time Forgot!"	Eric Towner and Alex Kamer	Geoff Barbanell and Itai Grunfeld	May 21, 2021
As Jodie forces MODOK to move out, they find an album for Third Eye Blind, whose concert MODOK and Jodie failed to attend in their college years. MODOK and his A.I.M. subordinate Gary break into S.H.I.E.L.D. to steal a time machine so that MODOK can take Jodie back in time to the concert. She reluctantly agrees, but they arrive too early. MODOK's younger self sees his older counterpart and follows them into the future. MODOK and Jodie have fun at the concert, but she discovers him trying to kill a young Austin to reclaim his job. The younger MODOK, angered at his older self's ineptitude, fights him, causing the time machine's Chrono Crystal to shatter and become embedded in the younger MODOK's face, displacing him from time. MODOK and Jodie seek out a young Monica to fix the time machine, but instead realize that they are stuck and accidentally ruin Monica's future. After learning that they missed the concert because Jodie was pregnant, MODOK and Jodie watch themselves growing together as a family until they prevent themselves from time traveling, erasing their development and leaving MODOK and Super-Adaptoid to move out.
3	"Beware What from Portal Comes!"	Eric Towner and Alex Kamer	Brett Cawley and Robert Maitia	May 21, 2021
MODOK has the weekend with his kids while Jodie is set to promote her new book. Austin invites MODOK to a GRUMBL conference as a "guest of honor" and MODOK brings the kids. While Lou enjoys the hotel accommodations, Melissa voices her disapproval of the situation, so MODOK brings her to the party and reveals that he must impress GRUMBL's superiors. However, Austin humiliates him and Melissa deduces that Austin invited MODOK to make him look bad. She teaches her father to exploit other people's flaws so that he can control them psychologically. This works, but he refuses to "play the long game" and decides to summon the Brood so he can save the party. Instead, he accidentally summons Ciegrimites, who begin to party the guests to death. Using Melissa's tactics, MODOK manages to kill the Ciegrimites. Afterwards, MODOK discovers that Melissa simply wants his approval and promises her that she does not need to visit him all the time. Meanwhile, Austin collects MODOK's portal device and presents it to his superiors, revealed to be an unknown alien species.
4	"If Saturday Be... For the Boys!"	Eric Towner and Alex Kamer	Patton Oswalt	May 21, 2021
MODOK decides to drink his troubles away at a Soho bar, but discovers that he has lost his status with the other A-list villains, who challenge him to steal Captain America's shield to regain his membership. MODOK goes to the Bar with No Name and recruits D-list villains Armadillo, Poundcakes, Melter, Angar the Screamer, and Tenpin with the promise that they are stealing money. MODOK has Super-Adaptoid drive them, but they keep making various stops and MODOK begins to sympathize with the villains. After accidentally revealing his plan and getting Super-Adaptoid stolen by teens, MODOK reconciles the situation by buying the group meatloaf and plotting to steal the shield for the Bar With No Name instead, but they sleep in on the trip to Avengers Tower and Melter later dies of excitement. Meanwhile, Lou posts a YouTube video of him eating ten PayDays and Jodie takes him to A.I.M. to ask MODOK to remove the video, as it contradicts her book's claim that Lou has a nut allergy. However, Jodie gets drunk with Monica, who injects Lou with a serum to make him allergic to peanuts while he befriends Monica's daughter Carmilla. Super-Adaptoid is kidnapped by the younger MODOK.
5	"If Bureaucracy Be... Thy Death!"	Eric Towner and Alex Kamer	Cullen Crawford	May 21, 2021
In 2009, Monica excitedly joins A.I.M. under MODOK, but he steals credit for her killing a major Avenger. After attending Melter's funeral, MODOK becomes inspired to perfect his legacy at A.I.M. by firing a black hole gun at Avengers Tower to kill Iron Man, but has to go through various channels that will take three months. Meanwhile, Monica's research into manatee soldiers gets stalled as she has not taken any vacation days, so she works with MODOK to gain access to the black hole gun and deplete her vacations days. Their plan is successful, but Monica outs the plan to Austin to get revenge on MODOK. MODOK and Monica fight, leaving her victorious as Austin elects her the new Scientist Supreme and demotes MODOK. While being forced to work on GRUMBL approved projects however, she recalls how MODOK did believe in her work despite his behavior. As MODOK sulks in front of Avengers Tower, Monica's new position is revealed to be part of Austin's plan on behalf of Hexus, the Living Corporation.
6	"Tales from the Great Bar-Mitzvah War!"	Eric Towner and Alex Kamer	Lauren Sadja Otero	May 21, 2021
MODOK creates a trash portal to Asgard and accidentally kills Balder with a shredder. Jodie has MODOK look after Lou, who is insistent on performing magic tricks at his Bar Mitzvah. At Lou's Bar Mitzvah recital, MODOK becomes annoyed by his son's magic and discards his equipment into the portal, but Lou goes in after it. MODOK follows and witnesses Lou being kidnapped by Kobold Goblins, but damages his flight mechanism, forcing him to get goats to pull him. He finds his son, but the latter has become a success as a magician and kicks MODOK out when he does not appreciate him. Convincing Balder's warriors that Lou was responsible for the trash portal, MODOK uses them to go to war with the Goblins until he eventually admits to Lou that he is afraid Lou will be humiliated if he performs magic. Lou uses his magic to fake MODOK's death for the Goblins while MODOK happily accepts Lou's hobby. While speaking with the rabbi, MODOK realizes that Lou is pursuing magic to cope with the divorce. Meanwhile, Super-Adaptoid decides to work with the young MODOK.
7	"This Man... This Makeover!"	Eric Towner and Alex Kamer	Yolanda Carney	May 21, 2021
One month prior, Jodie is approached by a publisher who insists that she must gain new fame for her book to become popular. She later meets Wonder Man and begins a relationship with him, drastically increasing her publicity. A depressed MODOK encounters Jodie and Wonder Man, and is later invited to a party in Jodie's honor. At Gary's suggestion, MODOK approaches Melissa to give him a makeover in an effort to win Jodie back. At the party, Jodie deliberately provokes a fight between Wonder Man and MODOK for extra publicity, and kicks MODOK out. Meanwhile, Melissa and Lou use one of MODOK's inventions to become inebriated and bond over how their parents have changed. Wonder Man breaks up with Jodie after realizing she has been using him. Unbeknownst to MODOK and Jodie, the publisher was a disguised Super-Adaptoid acting on behalf of young MODOK, who hires Arcade to assist him further. MODOK reads Jodie's book and follows its advice to clean himself up. As he prepares to give Jodie the divorce papers, she tosses them and takes him back.
8	"O, Were Blood Thicker Than Robot Juice!"	Eric Towner and Alex Kamer	Brett Cawley and Robert Maitia	May 21, 2021
MODOK awakens to a very subservient family who are happy to have him back. In reality, young MODOK kidnapped his family and replaced them with robot doppelgangers to force them to watch present MODOK enjoying himself. The family is able to alert MODOK, who leaves a robot double in his place and tracks his family down, freeing them from their prison. However, when MODOK finds his family, they are paired with another group of doppelgangers, and the younger MODOK and his minions reveal themselves. Arcade welcomes them to his Murderworld, explaining that the family must kill their doppelgangers within a time limit or else they will all be killed. The family manages to discover the real MODOK, Jodie, and Melissa, but leave two Lous. Not wanting to kill either Lou, MODOK provokes young MODOK into disavowing Arcade, who storms off. Young MODOK damages his older self, but an angered Jodie rips young MODOK in half and Melissa uses his circuitry to fix present MODOK. Following this, the family, the extra Lou, and a reset Super-Adaptoid go to dinner.
9	"What Menace Doth the Mailman Deliver!"	Eric Towner and Alex Kamer	Geoff Barbanell and Itai Grunfeld	May 21, 2021
After visiting Melter's grave, MODOK decides to change for the better and become the perfect A.I.M. employee, confusing everyone around him. Seeking to corrupt Earth and steal its resources as they had done to worlds before, Hexus tells Austin to move up the launch of the GROME, a smart device with hypnotic capabilities, to accelerate their invasion. When Austin learns that Hexus plans to kill his dog Sherlock, he tries to stall the device's completion, but MODOK reveals that he can fix the flaws and is assigned to it. Monica becomes increasingly paranoid over MODOK's demeanor and believes he is plotting to overthrow her while Gary believes that Austin is to blame for MODOK's behavior and plots to kill him, damaging his relationship with his husband, Big Mike. After completing the device, MODOK unexpectedly meets with Iron Man and has him buy his and Monica's A.I.M. shares, thus allowing him to buy the company. Austin tries to warn MODOK about the GROME, but is killed by Gary. MODOK invites Monica and Gary to join his new company, A-I-M-2. Meanwhile, Hexus hires a new C.E.O. in Austin's place and plots revenge on MODOK.
10	"Days of Future M.O.D.O.K.s"	Eric Towner and Alex Kamer	Jordan Blum	May 21, 2021
As the Lous prepare for their Bar Mitzvah, MODOK and Jodie realize that they need to bring other kids to the party. MODOK has Melissa take him to the mall so that they can invite other kids through the guise of them auditioning for a show, but MODOK ruins it. As MODOK invites his friends to the party, the Lous admit that they simply want to dance with their father and he complies. Jodie tells MODOK that she is not ready to get back together, but wants to stay close. However, young MODOK arrives, having faked his death. Calling himself "The Anomaly", he attempts to kill MODOK's family, but MODOK fights back, causing Anomaly to accidentally freeze time. Using his newly acquired time traveling ability, Anomaly reveals he has seen multiple timelines where MODOK's life ends in failure except for one where his family dies, which drives him to become a better villain. Loving his family dearly, MODOK struggles to decide whether he should let them die, but Anomaly kills them. After killing the Avengers and building a utopia for himself, MODOK tortures Anomaly to death in a failed attempt to bring his family back.

== Production ==
=== Development ===
In February 2019, Marvel Television announced plans to develop an adult animated television series based on MODOK, with a series order at Hulu, along with ones based on Hit-Monkey, Tigra and Dazzler, and Howard the Duck, that were intended to lead up to a crossover special titled The Offenders. The series was created by Jordan Blum and Patton Oswalt, both of whom were expected to write for the series and executive produce alongside Jeph Loeb. Brett Crawley, Robert Maitia, Grant Gish, Joe Quesada, and Karim Zreik also executive produce. In December, Marvel Television was folded into Marvel Studios, which carried subsequent oversight of the series. The following month, Marvel decided not to move forward with Howard the Duck, Tigra & Dazzler, and The Offenders, with M.O.D.O.K. and Hit-Monkey continuing as planned.

Following Marvel Television's absorption into Marvel Studios, Blum stated that Kevin Feige was supportive of the show and told him to "keep going" with the concept. Blum was allowed to give the series its own multiverse designation and chose Earth-1226 in honor of his son's birthday. In April 2021, Blum revealed that a second season was planned. In January 2022, Hulu's head of content Craig Erwich stated that additional seasons of M.O.D.O.K. would be determined solely by the Marvel Studios team. In May 2022, Hulu canceled the series after one season.

=== Casting ===
The series' announcement revealed that Oswalt was set to voice M.O.D.O.K. In January 2020, the announcement of Aimee Garcia, Ben Schwartz, Melissa Fumero, Wendi McLendon-Covey, Beck Bennett, Jon Daly, and Sam Richardson as the series' cast was confirmed. By then, Craig Erwich, Hulu's Senior Vice President of Originals, revealed that "a few episodes of" the series had completed recording.

=== Writing ===
By October 2020, Oswalt confirmed that writing and audio recording for the series had concluded, under the working title Bighead. Oswalt stated that Marvel allowed him and the creative team to include a variety of popular and relatively unknown characters in the series, which include several superheroes and members of X-Men–related teams. Blum said that due to rights issues, the only characters they could not use were Stilt-Man, Paste-Pot Pete and Turner D. Century. Prior to the cancellation of The Offenders, Blum was brought on to overlook the other shows and had even thought up about what the crossover would have entailed. He added that not much had changed storywise when it was decided to make M.O.D.O.K. a standalone series.

=== Animation ===
Work on the stop-motion aspects of the series was revealed to have been completed by October 2020 with Stoopid Buddy Stoodios providing the visuals for the episodes, which had "every frame [packed] with crazy detail". During the series' New York Comic Con online panel later that month, Oswalt revealed that Stoopid Buddy Studios created "innovative technology" that used handheld-styled cinematography techniques for the stop-motion puppet designs of the characters and environment.

=== Music ===
Daniel Rojas serves as the composer for the series.

== Marketing ==
In September 2020, Hulu revealed the series' logo, and Entertainment Weekly released first look images for the series on October 9, 2020, ahead of a panel that was held during the virtual New York Comic Con later that day, where Blum and Oswalt presented two clips from the series and a behind-the-scenes B-roll.

To promote the series, Patton Oswalt and Jordan Blum co-wrote a miniseries for Marvel Comics titled M.O.D.O.K.: Head Games. The comic quickly establishes the existence of M.O.D.O.K.'s family from the Hulu series into the mainstream Marvel Universe, albeit as a trio of Super-Adaptoids that were copied from his hallucinations brought upon by a glitched program in his head.

== Release ==
M.O.D.O.K. premiered on Hulu on May 21, 2021, releasing all ten episodes simultaneously. On that same day, the first episode was released on the Star content hub of Disney+ with a subsequent weekly window.

== Reception ==
=== Viewership ===
Whip Media, which tracks global TV viewership habits for nearly 1 million global users of its TV Time app daily, reported that M.O.D.O.K. was the third most-anticipated new television series for May 2021. Market research company Parrot Analytics, which looks at consumer engagement in consumer research, streaming, downloads, and on social media, announced that M.O.D.O.K. had an audience demand multiplier of 4.6 as of May 29, 2021, meaning it was 4.6 times more in demand than the average television series.

=== Critical response ===
The review aggregator website Rotten Tomatoes reports an 88% approval rating with an average rating of 7.77/10 based on 34 critic reviews. The website's critical consensus reads: "Though its tendency toward too-muchness may test some viewers' patience, slick stop-motion, a killer voice cast, and a seemingly endless well of jokes make M.O.D.O.K. an entertainingly chaotic diversion." On Metacritic, it has a weighted average score of 71 out of 100 based on 8 critic reviews, indicating "generally favorable reviews".

Glen Weldon of NPR gave the series a positive review, comparing it to Robot Chicken and stating, "Marvel's M.O.D.O.K. was expressly created to cordon off one tiny, weird, backwater corner of the Marvel Universe, and go nuts. Which is exactly what it accomplishes, in a fun, if Robot Chicken-flavored, way." Daniel Fienberg of The Hollywood Reporter gave the series a more critical review, comparing it to both Robot Chicken and Harley Quinn, saying that it "falls short of Harley Quinn territory and lands smack-dab in the middle of Robot Chicken country," and finally stating that "The voices and pell-mell references are the biggest reason why a 10-episode weekend binge of Marvel's MODOK amounted to such easy, quickly digested entertainment. Whether or not you think the series wants to amount to more than that — and I feel like it really does, and perhaps someday could — depends on you."

Eric Francisco of Inverse gave the series a positive review, stating that "In its own tragicomic corner, outside the Marvel Cinematic Universe, M.O.D.O.K. shines as a nuanced portrait of a supervillain trying to have it all" and that "M.O.D.O.K. has strengths all its own, primarily as a too-real tragicomedy about a life gone awry and a marriage crumbling into dust," while adding that "it isn't as funny, vulgar, or insightful as Harley Quinn ... nor is it as boundary-expanding as WandaVision." Siddhant Adlakha of IGN gave the series an 8 out of 10 rating, stating that "Marvel's farcical M.O.D.O.K. series is a refreshing, mile-a-minute comic self-parody. Every line is a laugh, and Patton Oswalt is pitch-perfect as the iconic supervillain, whose Frankenstein origins are traded in for a streamlined saga of ego and ambition, blended with both a modern workplace comedy and a surprisingly moving family sitcom."

Collider included M.O.D.O.K in their "Best Comedy Shows on Hulu" list in September 2022. Entertainment Weekly included M.O.D.O.K in their "The best TV shows on Hulu" list of Summer 2022.

=== Accolades ===
M.O.D.O.K. was nominated for Best Animation TrailerByte for a Feature Film at the 2022 Golden Trailer Awards.
