= Advanced Idea Mechanics =

Fictional comic book villainous organization

A.I.M.

Publication information
- Publisher: Marvel Comics
- First appearance: Strange Tales #146 (July 1966)
- Created by: Stan Lee; Jack Kirby

In-story information
- Type of organization: Technology; Terrorist
- Leader(s): Monica Rappaccini; Andrew Forson; Baron Strucker; MODOK; Sunspot
- Agent(s): Allesandro Brannex; Doomsday Man; Head Case

A.I.M. (Advanced Idea Mechanics) is a fictional criminal organization appearing in American comic books published by Marvel Comics. Created by Stan Lee and Jack Kirby, it first appeared in Strange Tales #146 (July 1966). A.I.M. is generally depicted as a think tank of brilliant scientists dedicated to world domination through technological means. The organization started as the scientific division of Hydra founded by Baron Strucker, but has since become independent. Some of its most notable creations include the Cosmic Cube, the Super-Adaptoid, and MODOK, who has been depicted as a prominent member of A.I.M. and sometimes as the organization's leader.

Since its original introduction in comics, A.I.M. has been featured in various other Marvel-licensed products, including video games and television series. The organization made its live action debut in the Marvel Cinematic Universe film Iron Man 3 (2013), in which it was headed by Aldrich Killian.

== Publication history ==
A.I.M. troopers from Tales of Suspense #94. Art by Jack Kirby and Joe Sinnott.

A.I.M. debuted in Strange Tales #146 (July 1966), created by Stan Lee and Jack Kirby. It is revealed to be a branch of the organization known as THEM in Strange Tales #147 (August 1966). A large organization was mentioned in Strange Tales #142 (March 1966) and depicted in Tales of Suspense #78 (June 1966) a few months earlier. It is later revealed in Strange Tales #149 (October 1966) that THEM is also a parent organization to the Secret Empire and is a new incarnation of the previously dissolved Hydra.

== Organization ==
A.I.M. is described as an organization of scientists and their hirelings dedicated to the acquisition of power and overthrowing of all the world's governments through science and technology. Its leadership traditionally consists of the seven-member Board of Directors (formerly known as the Imperial Council) with a rotating chairperson. Under the Directors in the hierarchy are various division supervisors, and under them are the technicians and salesmen/dealers.

The organization supplies arms and technology to various terrorist and subversive organizations to foster a violent technological revolution and to generate profit. A.I.M. operatives are usually involved in research, development, manufacturing, and sales of technology. Members of A.I.M. are required to have at least a master's degree, if not a PhD, in an area of science, mathematics, or business.

A.I.M.'s reach is worldwide and it operates various front organizations such as Targo Corporation, International Data Integration and Control, Cadenza Industries, Koenig and Strey, Pacific Vista Laboratories, Allen's Department Store, and Omnitech. It has had a number of bases of operations, including a nuclear submarine in the Atlantic Ocean; bases in the Bronx, New York; Black Mesa, Colorado; West Caldwell, New Jersey; Asia, Canada, Europe, Haiti, India, Sudan and Boca Caliente (also known as A.I.M. Island), an island republic in the Caribbean.

== Equipment and technology ==
The greatest of A.I.M.'s major implements of deadly potential is the Cosmic Cube, a device capable of altering reality. However, A.I.M. does not realize that the cube is merely a containment device, in which the real power is an entity accidentally drawn into their dimension. The Cosmic Cube eventually evolves into Kubik.

Their second achievement is the Super-Adaptoid, an android capable of mimicking the appearance and superpowers of other beings, which is made possible by incorporating a sliver of the Cosmic Cube into its form. When Kubik recovers the sliver after defeating the Adaptoid, the android is rendered inanimate.

A.I.M.'s third major achievement is the creation of MODOK (Mental Organism Designed Only for Killing), an artificially mutated human with an enormous head accompanied by a massive computational brain and psionic abilities. MODOK is originally an A.I.M. scientist named George Tarleton, who is selected by A.I.M.'s leader at the time, the Scientist Supreme, to be the subject of the bionic and genetic experiments that turn him into MODOK. After his transformation, MODOK kills the Scientist Supreme and takes control of A.I.M., later taking advantage of the chaos within Hydra following Hydra Island's destruction and the deaths of Baron Strucker and most of Hydra's leading members to sever all of A.I.M.'s ties with Hydra. A.I.M. has remained independent ever since.

A.I.M. has made developments in fields such as advanced weaponry (plasma blasters, cryo-cannons, anti-charge bazookas, paralyzer rays, q-bombs, sonatrons), robots (synthoids, Adaptoids, robot duplicates, giant robots, etc.), cyborgs, artificial lifeforms, biological viruses (Omega Bacillus, Virus X), radio wave-transmitted "broadcast power," and mind control, cloaking, and teleportation technology. Its agents use a variety of submarines, hovercraft, jets, ships, and other vehicles. A.I.M. has also attempted to recreate versions of MODOK, including transforming Katherine Waynesboro into Ms. MODOK and creating SODAM.

A.I.M.'s leaders traditionally wear yellow three-piece business suits. Technical supervisors wear yellow jumpsuits, skull-caps, and goggles. The organization is known for the "beekeeper"-like outfits of its underlings since their first appearance.

== Fictional organization history ==
A.I.M.'s origins begin late in World War II with Baron Strucker's creation of Hydra. Under the code name THEM, he creates two Hydra branches called Advanced Idea Mechanics and the Secret Empire. A.I.M.'s purpose is to develop advanced weaponry for Hydra. It is close to developing and attaining nuclear weapons when Hydra Island is invaded by American and Japanese troops. Although Hydra suffers a major setback, it survives and grows in secret over the following decades.

A.I.M. has numerous encounters with various superheroes and supervillains and is the subject of ongoing undercover investigations by S.H.I.E.L.D. It is responsible for reviving the Red Skull from suspended animation. An A.I.M. android factory in a Florida swamp is raided by S.H.I.E.L.D., which also involves Count Bornag Royale due to a weapons deal negotiation. A.I.M. then raids S.H.I.E.L.D.'s New York City headquarters. As a result of these events, Royale is discredited, and A.I.M.'s headquarters are destroyed.

A.I.M. employs Batroc the Leaper to recover an explosive compound called Inferno 42 and dispatches a chemical android against Nick Fury and Captain America. A.I.M. also dispatches their special agent, the Cyborg, against Captain America. A.I.M. is involved in a skirmish with the Maggia and its "Big M". A.I.M. also captures Iron Man in an attempt to analyze and replicate his armor. MODOK and A.I.M. are responsible for transforming Betty Ross briefly into the creature Harpy. A.I.M. dispatches their special agent the Destructor to capture Ms. Marvel.

== Heroic offshoots ==
=== Avengers Idea Mechanics ===
During the Time Runs Out storyline, Sunspot reveals that he bought A.I.M and used their resources to investigate incursions threatening reality. Heroes working as part of Avengers Idea Mechanics include Hawkeye, Squirrel Girl, Songbird, Wiccan, Hulkling, White Tiger, Power Man, and Pod. Sunspot reveals he has fired much of higher management. Many heroes working in the primary Avengers team, such as Thor and Hyperion, work side by side with A.I.M. When they create a machine to propel individuals across the multiverse, some of the heroes who were helping A.I.M. offer themselves for a one-way trip to find the origin of the incursions threatening all reality.

Following the fight against Maker, Sunspot meets with the government and they make plans to merge Avengers Idea Mechanics with the U.S. government. At the same time, Avengers Idea Mechanics defeats A.I.M's splinter groups.

=== American Intelligence Mechanics ===
The merger between the U.S. government and Avengers Idea Mechanics results in the formation of American Intelligence Mechanics. Since Sunspot had turned the organization into a force for good, rogue cells exist fighting for A.I.M.'s original goals on behalf of their former leaders, Andrew Forson and Monica Rappaccini. To tackle the nuisances caused by these cells, Sunspot's successor Toni Ho lets them reclaim the organization's acronym, while rebranding her own organization into R.E.S.C.U.E.

== Splinter groups ==
These AIM splinter cells have appeared in various issues:

- Advanced Ideas in Destruction (AID)
  - Michael Friedman
- Radically Advanced Ideas in Destruction (RAID) – AIM-like company. Designed exoskeleton. Forced to help Captain America track the Cosmic Cube.
- Advanced Genocide Mechanics (AGM) – Located in the Congo. Led by MODOG (Mental Organism Designed Only for Genocide).

=== Fronts ===
- Adarco Corporation (Advanced Robotic Company) – Developed Annex and BREW technology.
  - Dr. Hillman Barto – Ally of Annex. Deceased.
  - Brace – A cyborg. Destroyed by Annex.
- Cadence Industries – Entertainment media company that collects the corpse of MODOK.
- IDIC (International Data Integration and Control)
  - Diadem (Lucieane D'Hiven)
  - Kenjiro Tanaka – Former S.H.I.E.L.D. agent who trained alongside Wendell Vaughn. Infiltrates IDIC and stays on as an employee after the break-up of SHIELD. Leaves to join Vaughn Securities and is promoted to partner and eventually CEO due to Vaughan spending less time on Earth.
- Koenig and Strey – Based in Manhattan.
- Omnitech
- Targo Corporation

== Members ==
=== Leaders ===
- Alessandro Brannex (Super-Adaptoid) – Android and chairman of the board.
- Monica Rappaccini – The Scientist Supreme of A.I.M. and mother of Carmilla Black.
- George Tarleton a.k.a. MODOK (Mental Organism Designed Only for Killing) – A former scientist working for A.I.M. who later became Scientist Supreme.

==== High Council of A.I.M. ====
- Andrew Forson – Supreme Leader of the High Council of A.I.M.
- Graviton – Minister of Science.
- Jude the Entropic Man – Minister of Health.
- Mentallo – Minister of Public Affairs.
- Superia – Minister of Education.
- Taskmaster – Minister of Defense (undercover for the Secret Avengers).
- Yelena Belova – Minister of State.

==== Former ====
- George Clinton – The former Scientist Supreme, Clinton was involved in the creation of MODOC/MODOK and the Cosmic Cube.
- Chet Madden – Former head of A.I.M.
- Dr. Lyle Getz – Former Scientist Supreme. Deceased.
- Headcase (Sean Madigan) – Long-lost son of MODOK.
- Maxwell Mordius – Deceased.
- Valdemar Tykkio – Scientist Supreme. Institutes a takeover of Boca Caliente. Brother of Yorgon Tykkio.
- Wolfgang von Strucker (Baron Strucker) – Nazi founder of Hydra.
- Alvin Tarleton – George Tarleton's father and a founding member of A.I.M. Alvin got George a job with A.I.M. as a custodian, then authorized his transformation into MODOK.

==== Members and agents ====
- AD-45 Riot-Bots
- Abu-Jamal Rodriguez
- Alexandre Copernicus
- Andrew Ritter
- Arthur Shaman – Hypnotist.
- B'Tumba – Wakandan, son of N'Baza, an old friend of T'Challa. Allies with A.I.M. to sell vibranium. Sacrifices his life to save T'Challa from A.I.M.
- Baron Samedi
- Bernard Worrell – Member of A.I.M.'s Blue Faction.
- Betty Sumitro
- Betty Swanson
- Brace
- Brendon Newton
- Cache – Artificial intelligence.
- Carl Alexis Lombardi
- Clete Billups
- Clytemnestra Erwin – Infiltrates Stark Enterprises to gain revenge on Tony Stark for causing the death of her brother Morley. Killed by an out-of-control A.I.M. missile.
- Commander Robert Cypher – Seeks technology to take control of nuclear missiles.
- Count Bornag Royale
- Cyborg – Hired assassin.
- David Garrett – Ally of A.I.M. Funds Gilbert Wiles to monitor his tracking of the Uni-Power. Slain by Lombardi after outliving his usefulness.
- Destructor (Kerwin Korman) – A former weapons-maker, Korman was connected to Doomsday Man by A.I.M. technicians and used as its power source. After being freed from Doomsday Man, Korman requires continued connection to its remnants for life support.
- Doctor Nemesis (Michael Craig Stockton)
- Doomsday Man – A virtually indestructible robot created to steal cobalt bombs and blackmail the United States. After being destroyed by Ms. Marvel, Doomsday Man was rebuilt by A.I.M.
- Dr. Cristiano Ryder – Poses as a S.H.I.E.L.D. agent to regain control of Android X-4.
- Dr. Ralph Rider – Brother of Charles Rider, uncle of Richard Rider and Robert Rider. Leading research scientist until killed by Photon (Jason Dean).
- Evelyn Necker – Earth-8410 liaison.
- Fixer (Paul Norbert Ebersol)
- Grizzly – A.I.M. agent R-1. Used by MODOK in a plot to capture atomic scientist Paul Fosgrave. Not to be confused with the Spider-Man enemy or Cable's deceased teammate.
- Harness (Erika Benson) – Mother of Piecemeal. Forced to locate and absorb the energy of Proteus. Wears an armored exo-skeleton.
- Harold Bainbridge – Agent that Mockingbird impersonates during the Secret Avengers' raid on A.I.M. Island.
- Highwayman – English criminal. Attempts to steal the Cognium Steel from Oracle INC., but is defeated by Iron Fist.
- Hyun Rahman
- Ian Fitzpatrick (Mr. Jinx)
- James Hendrickson
- Jason Rilker
- Jethro Prufrock – Father of George and Martha Prufock. Perennial right-wing Libertarian candidate for president and a staunch advocate of arms-stockpiling. Slain by a mutated George.
- Julia Black – Adoptive mother of Carmilla Black. Former ties to Symbionese Liberation Army. Deceased.
- Lifeform (George Prufrock) – Mutated into a progressively larger carnivorous creature by exposure to an experimental virus developed by his father, Jethro Prufock, at A.I.M.
- MODAM (Olinka Barankova) – Creation of A.I.M. whose name is an acronym for Mobile Organism Designed for Aggressive Maneuvers. Also operates under the names "Maria Pym" and SODAM (Specialized Organism Designed for Aggressive Maneuvers).
- Marc Planck
- Mentallo (Marvin Flumm)
- Njeri Damphousse – Currently still with A.I.M.
- Paul Allen – Infiltrates S.H.I.E.L.D. Current whereabouts are unknown.
- Peggy Park
- Professor Aaron Whyte
- Ramona Starr – Shoots Ka-Zar in the head and forces him to perform a mission for A.I.M. Also known as Ramona Courtland.
- Red Skull (Johann Schmidt)
- Seekers
- Solemne Brannex – Possibly the sister of Allesandro Brannex. Seeks aid from S.H.I.E.L.D. when A.I.M. obtains a Shi'ar vessel.
- Stryke
- Super-Adaptoid – A robot that can copy the appearance and superpowers of anyone.
- Timekeeper – Scientist and leader of an A.I.M. outpost in Venture Ridge, Wyoming.
- Timothy Black – Adoptive father of Carmilla Black. Former ties to Symbionese Liberation Army. Deceased.
- Victorius (Victor Conrad)
- Wakers – A.I.M. deep penetration agents under the leadership of Scorpion (Carmilla Black) and four others. Genetically engineered to resist chemical, biological, and nuclear weapons,
  - Lars Branco – Waker agent. Deceased.
- Warbot – A.I.M. weapon. Used by Arthur Shaman to capture the Hulk to use against Ms. Marvel. Destroyed by Ms. Marvel.
- Yorgon Tykkio – The brother of Valdemar Tykkio, Yorgon became a cyborg and led a revolt against his brother's rule. He is killed by Clytemnestra when she is attempting to flee from him.

==== Avengers/American Idea Mechanics members ====
- Roberto da Costa - Supreme Leader following his acquisition and buying out of A.I.M.'s faculties.
- Toni Ho - Scientist and engineer whose work emulates Stark's Iron Man designs. Becomes the second Rescue and later the third Iron Patriot.
- Red Hulk (Robert Maverick) - A general who uses a Hulk Plug-In to become a version of Red Hulk for one hour at a time.

== Reception ==
=== Critical response ===
Screen Rant included A.I.M. in their "Marvel: The 10 Most Powerful Henchmen In The Comics" list. Comic Book Resources ranked A.I.M. 7th in their "10 Most Powerful Secret Organizations In Marvel Comics" list, and 10th in their "10 Most Evil Teams In Marvel" list.

=== Impact ===
Both A.I.M. and Hydra first appeared in the 1960s as analogues for the threat of Communism, but are also associated with Nazism and resemble organizations fought by Captain America in World War II. Political science professor Matthew J. Costello has pointed out that this conflation of communism and Nazism removes ambiguity from the threat and thus from America's moral superiority in the comics. In contrast, in the post-9/11 context of Iron Man 3, Pepper says of Extremis' war profiteering, "That's exactly what [Stark Industries] used to do." Whereas immediately after 9/11 Captain America was concerned with Islamic terrorism, by 2005–2007 he was primarily engaged with homegrown terrorists: A.I.M. and A.I.D.

== Other versions ==
=== 2020 Death's Head Future ===
A future (2020) version of A.I.M is featured heavily in the Marvel UK limited series Death's Head II. This future organisation creates the cyborg Minion, which is later taken over by the personality of Death's Head.

=== Heroes Reborn ===
An alternate universe iteration of A.I.M. appears in Heroes Reborn, led by Baron Zemo and MODOK.

=== House of M ===
An alternate universe iteration of A.I.M. appears in House of M. This version is a resistance movement led by Monica Rappaccini against Exodus.

=== Marvel Adventures ===
An alternate universe iteration of A.I.M. appears in the Marvel Adventures continuity.

=== Ultimate Marvel ===
An alternate universe iteration of A.I.M. appears in the Ultimate Marvel imprint, with George Tarleton as a leading member.

=== Ultimate Universe ===
An alternate universe iteration of A.I.M. appears in the Ultimate Universe imprint.

== In other media ==
=== Television ===
- Though they go unnamed, a group of A.I.M. agents make a cameo in a flashback in the Spider-Man and His Amazing Friends episode "The X-Men Adventure".
- A.I.M. appears in Iron Man.
- A.I.M. appears in Iron Man: Armored Adventures, with the Scientist Supreme, the Controller and MODOC as prominent members.
- A.I.M. appears in The Avengers: Earth's Mightiest Heroes.
- A.I.M. appears in Marvel Anime: Wolverine, with Hideki Kurohagi and Shingen Yashida as prominent members.
- A.I.M. appears in Avengers Assemble.
- A.I.M. appears in Spider-Man, with Monica Rappaccini and MODOK as prominent members.
- A.I.M. appears in M.O.D.O.K. This version is entirely founded and led by MODOK, although he eventually causes the organization to go bankrupt and allows the rival company GRUMBL to buy it out. Throughout the series, MODOK schemes to reclaim his position as A.I.M.'s leader and eliminate GRUMBL CEO Austin Van Der Sleet, although these attempts continually end in failure and lead to him being demoted and replaced by Monica Rappaccini as Scientist Supreme. Meanwhile, Van Der Sleet uses A.I.M.'s resources and technology to further the plans of his superior Hexus. By the end of the first season, MODOK sells his A.I.M. shares to Iron Man, enabling him to buy out A.I.M. from GRUMBL, while MODOK, Rappaccini, and A.I.M. subordinate Gary establish A-I-M-2 independently.

=== Film ===
- A.I.M. appears in Iron Man: Rise of Technovore.
- A.I.M. appears in Iron Man 3. This version is a government-sanctioned, privately funded think-tank founded by Aldrich Killian.

=== Video games ===
- A.I.M. troopers and attack drones appear in the Omega Base level in Marvel Ultimate Alliance, with the former voiced by Steve Blum.
- A.I.M. appears in the 2008 Iron Man film tie-in game.
- A.I.M. appears in the PS2 and PSP versions of Spider-Man: Web of Shadows, having aligned themselves with Spencer Smythe.
- A.I.M. agents appear in Marvel Super Hero Squad, voiced by Travis Willingham, Nolan North, and Troy Baker.
- A.I.M. appears in the Iron Man 2 film tie-in game, with its agents voiced by Catherine Campion, Andrew Chaikin, Denny Delk, Eric Goldberg, Adam Harrington, and Roger L. Jackson.
- A.I.M. and their R.A.I.D. (Radically Advanced Ideas of Destruction) branch appear in Marvel Avengers Alliance.
- A.I.M. appears in Iron Man 3: The Official Game.
- A.I.M. appears in Marvel Heroes, where it is led by MODOK.
- A.I.M. appears in Lego Marvel Super Heroes, where it is led by MODOK.
- A.I.M., hybridized with Resident Evil's Umbrella Corporation to create "A.I.M.brella", appears as a stage in Marvel vs. Capcom: Infinite. Unlike other fused locations, which were created by Ultron Sigma merging the Marvel and Capcom dimensions, A.I.M.brella is the result of a company merger, as both A.I.M. and Umbrella are led by evil scientists who choose to pool their resources.
- A.I.M. agents appear in Lego Marvel Super Heroes 2.
- A.I.M. is referenced in Spider-Man, providing funding to Otto Octavius when the city rescinds his development grant.
- A.I.M. appears in Marvel's Avengers. This version is a powerful multinational corporation founded by Dr. George Tarleton after the events of "A-Day" to protect the world through science as opposed to "fallible" heroes. After Tarleton is apparently killed in battle with the Avengers, Monica Rappaccini assumes control of A.I.M.

=== Live performance ===
A.I.M. appears in Marvel Universe: LIVE!.

=== Miscellaneous ===
Members of A.I.M. appear in issue #5 of The Avengers: United They Stand comic book series.
