= MODOK =

Marvel Comics fictional character

- M.O.D.O.K., as he appeared on the cover of M.O.D.O.K.: Head Trip (November 2019). Art by Sal Buscema.

Publication information
- Publisher: Marvel Comics
- First appearance: Tales of Suspense #94 (October 1967)
- Created by: Stan Lee; Jack Kirby

In-story information
- Alter ego: George Tarleton
- Species: Human mutate-cyborg
- Team affiliations: A.I.M.; Headmen; Intelligencia; Agents of MODOK (Mercenary Organization Dedicated Only to Killing)
- Partnerships: Monica Rappaccini; Zero/One; Vincent Doonan; JOD1E
- Notable aliases: MODOC (Mobile Organism Designed Only for Computing); MODOK Superior; BRODOK (Bio-Robotic Organism Designed Overwhelmingly for Kissing); Ulti-MODOK
- Abilities: Superhuman intelligence; Psionic powers

MODOK (/ˈmoʊdɒk/ MOH-dok; also written as M.O.D.O.K.; an acronym for Mental/Mobile/Mechanized Organism Designed Only for Killing) is a fictional character appearing in American comic books published by Marvel Comics. Created by Stan Lee and Jack Kirby, the character first appeared in Tales of Suspense #93 (September 1967). The first MODOK is George Tarleton, a former employee of Advanced Idea Mechanics (A.I.M.), an arms-dealing organization specializing in futuristic weaponry, who undergoes substantial mutagenic medical experimentation originally designed to increase his intelligence. While successful, the experiments result in his developing an oversized head and a stunted body, causing the character's signature look and use of a hoverchair for mobility. After the experiments, he kills his creators and takes control of A.I.M. In Hulk (2010), Amadeus Cho returns Tarleton to his human form, after which a MODOK clone dubbed MODOK Superior is created to replace him.

Debuting in the Silver Age of Comic Books, MODOK has appeared in over four decades of Marvel continuity, and starred in the miniseries Super-Villain Team-Up: MODOK's 11 #1–5 (Sept.–Dec. 2008), the self-titled one-shot M.O.D.O.K.: Reign Delay #1 (Nov. 2009) and the miniseries M.O.D.O.K.: Head Games #1–4 (Dec. 2020–April 2021), the last of which was released as a promotion for the eponymous animated series M.O.D.O.K. (2021), in which MODOK (and his younger alternate self, the Anomaly) was voiced by Patton Oswalt.

A different depiction of the character made his live-action debut in the Marvel Cinematic Universe film Ant-Man and the Wasp: Quantumania (2023), portrayed by Corey Stoll as Darren Cross.

== Publication history ==
MODOK's debut in Tales of Suspense #94, art by Jack Kirby

MODOK first appeared in Tales of Suspense #93–94 (Sept.–Oct. 1967), and became a recurring foe for the superhero Captain America, where he was created by Stan Lee and Jack Kirby. Writer Mike Conroy stated "Inevitably, he (MODOK) returned to plague Captain America, whose physical perfection he so resented." MODOK reappeared in Captain America #117–120 (Sept.–Dec. 1969), 124 (April 1970) and 130–133 (Oct. 1970–Jan. 1971). The character also featured in a storyline in Sub-Mariner (vol. 2) #47–49 (March–May 1972), before becoming the major villain in an extended storyline in The Incredible Hulk (vol. 2) #167–170 (Sept.–Dec. 1973). MODOK also participated in "The War of the Super-Villains" storyline in Iron Man #74–75 (May–June 1975). MODOK had a series of encounters with the superheroine Ms. Marvel in Ms. Marvel #5 (May 1977), 7 (July 1977) and 9–10 (Sept.–Oct. 1977). Constant battles against the Marvel heroes followed, including Iron Man Annual #4 (Dec. 1977); Marvel Team-Up #104 (April 1981) and Marvel Two-in-One #81–82 (Nov.–Dec. 1981). Following a failed bid to use fellow Hulk foe the Abomination to achieve his ends in The Incredible Hulk (vol. 2) #287–290 (Sept.–Dec. 1983), MODOK is assassinated by the Serpent Society in Captain America #313 (Jan. 1986). The character's body makes a ghoulish return in Iron Man #205 (April 1986).

During the Taking A.I.M. storyline in Avengers #386–387 (May–June 1995), Captain America #440 (June 1995), The Avengers #388 (July 1995) and Captain America #441 (July 1995), MODOK is resurrected. More typical attempts to better the character's situation followed in Iron Man/Captain America Annual 1998; The Defenders (vol. 2) #9–10 (Nov.–Dec. 2001); Wolverine (vol. 2) #142–143 (Sept.– Oct. 1999); Captain America and the Falcon #9 (Jan. 2005) and Cable & Deadpool #11 (March 2005). The character then made three humorous appearances, in Wha...Huh? #1 (Sept. 2005); Marvel Holiday Special 2006 (Jan. 2007) and GLA-Xmas Special #1 (Feb. 2006). After appearing briefly in the mutant titles X-Men #200 (Aug. 2007) and The Uncanny X-Men #488 (Sept. 2007), MODOK was featured in Ms. Marvel (vol. 2) #14–17 (June–Sept. 2007) and appeared in two miniseries: Marvel 1985 #1–6 (July–Dec. 2008) and Super-Villain Team-Up: MODOK's 11 #1–5 (Aug.–Dec. 2008). MODOK also featured in The Incredible Hulk (vol. 2) #600 (Sept. 2009); Astonishing Tales (vol. 2) #2 (May 2009) and the one-shot issue M.O.D.O.K.: Reign Delay #1 (Nov. 2009).

MODOK later gained a counterpart and successor in MODOK Superior, who first appeared in Hulk (vol. 2) #29 and was created by Jeff Parker and Gabriel Hardman, who is depicted as the archenemy of Gwendolyn "Gwen" Poole in The Unbelievable Gwenpool #1–25 (June 2016–April 2018), West Coast Avengers (vol. 3) #4 (Feb. 2019), and M.O.D.O.K.: Head Games #1–4 (Dec. 2020–March 2021).

== Fictional character biography ==
=== George Tarleton ===
George Tarleton as the original MODOK, as he appeared during his debut in Tales of Suspense #94 (October 1967), art by Jack Kirby.

George Tarleton was a technician for the scientific criminal organization Advanced Idea Mechanics (A.I.M.), founded by his father, Alvin. He was born in Bangor, Maine. Having recently created the Cosmic Cube, the A.I.M. scientists used advanced mutagenics to alter Tarleton and created the super-intelligent man-mind originally named MODOC (an acronym for "Mental Organism Designed Only for Computing") to study and improve upon the object, alongside the JOD1E program. MODOC, however, becomes ambitious, kills his creators and takes control of A.I.M. Renaming himself MODOK (an acronym for "Mental Organism Designed Only for Killing"), he comes into conflict with the hero Captain America, who is intent on rescuing S.H.I.E.L.D. agent Sharon Carter from A.I.M. MODOK becomes a recurring foe for Captain America, battling the hero on three more occasions, with the third and last encounter revealing the villain's origin. MODOK also battles Namor the Sub-Mariner and Doctor Doom, with the latter intent on claiming the Cosmic Cube for himself. MODOK reappears and abducts Betty Ross, changing her into the Harpy with gamma radiation at a higher level than that which turned Bruce Banner into the Hulk in a bid to destroy the monster. MODOK then follows the Hulk and the Harpy to a floating aerie, where Banner cures Ross of her condition. MODOK and a team of A.I.M. agents arrive in time to kill the creature known as the Bi-Beast, the guardian of the aerie, but not before activating a self-destruct mechanism, forcing everyone on board to flee. MODOK also accepts the offer of the extra-dimensional mystic the Black Lama to participate in the latter's War of the Super-Villains, (Note: Chronicled in Iron Man #68–75 (Dec. 1974–June 1975), 77 (Aug. 1975) and 80–81 (Nov.–Dec. 1975). The remaining issues – #76 (July 1975), 78 (Sept. 1975) and 79 (Oct. 1975) – are all separate one-issue Iron Man stories that are completely unconnected to the main storyline, with issue #76 actually being a reprint of Iron Man #9 (Jan. 1969).) but fails to gain the prize – a golden globe that is supposed to give the winner of the war ultimate power – after being defeated by Iron Man.

A.I.M. becomes dissatisfied with the lack of scientific advancement under MODOK's leadership and MODOK's obsession with seeking revenge against metahumans, finally deposing him from power as a result. MODOK attempts to regain control of the organization and prove his worth by unleashing a nerve agent on New York City, which is prevented by Ms. Marvel and the Vision. MODOK next seeks revenge against Ms. Marvel, first attempting to mentally control the heroine and then hiring the Shi'ar assassin Deathbird to kill her; Ms. Marvel overcomes both of these obstacles and defeats both Deathbird and MODOK. MODOK's ambitions grow and he seeks world domination, but is thwarted by Iron Man and the superhero team the Champions. After an attempt to plunder the resources of the Savage Land and a battle with Ka-Zar and the Hulk, the character develops a new biological agent called Virus X. MODOK's attempts to test the agent on the homeless is prevented by the Thing, the Sub-Mariner and Captain America, although the villain escapes and the Thing almost dies when he is exposed to the virus.

Abandoned by A.I.M. for these failures, MODOK resurrects the Abomination, planning to use him against his former organization. The plan fails when the Abomination is revealed to be mentally unstable to the point of sheer cowardice whenever he even hears the Hulk's name mentioned, although during the course of the storyline MODOK transforms Katherine Waynesboro into Ms. MODOK, a female counterpart (the first) of himself. Horrified by MODOK's callous disregard for life, Waynesboro demands to be returned to human form and MODOK willingly complies. Wishing to disassociate themselves from MODOK for good, A.I.M. hires the Serpent Society to assassinate the villain. They succeed, with Death Adder striking the killing blow. The Serpent Society returns MODOK's corpse to A.I.M., with the organization using it as a supercomputer. A rogue A.I.M. agent remotely operates MODOK's corpse in a bid to destroy Iron Man, with the battle ending with the corpse's destruction. Although MODOK had died, A.I.M. temporarily replaced him with his more loyal, and in some ways more effective, second female counterpart MODAM.

During the Taking A.I.M. storyline, MODOK is resurrected solely because A.I.M. needs him to assist in the creation of another Cosmic Cube. In one of the attempts to create the Cube, MODAM is killed (or at least disappears). Eventually it is revealed that MODOK has actually been stranded in an alternate dimension, but manages to return to Earth with the unintended help of the supervillain team the Headmen. After attempting to steal a device that boosts mental power, MODOK agrees to aid the Headmen in their plans of conquest, but after taking control of A.I.M. once again he reneges on the agreement to avoid an encounter with the superhero non-team the Defenders. MODOK next clashes with the Canadian superhero team Alpha Flight before being captured by a group composed of U.S. Naval Intelligence and a drug cartel. MODOK is then lobotomized and employed to infiltrate spy satellites and manipulate the stock market, but he recovers from the lobotomy and exploits the situation to his own benefit until he is captured and taken into custody by S.H.I.E.L.D.

In GLX-Mas Special #1, MODOK and A.I.M. fought Dum Dum Dugan and his S.H.I.E.L.D. squad, but were defeated by Squirrel Girl and her squirrel sidekick Tippy-Toe. MODOK then seeks a sample of the cybernetic species the Phalanx, and after brief encounters with the mutant superhero team the X-Men, battles Ms. Marvel once again, with the heroine this time aided by fellow Avenger Wonder Man during an elaborate scheme by renegade A.I.M. branches to kill MODOK, with one of the rogue A.I.M. agents being MODOK's long-lost son, who seeks revenge for his abandonment. Employing an elaborate scheme and double-cross involving several supervillains, MODOK restores his personal wealth and power and re-establishes himself as the leader of A.I.M. once again. MODOK was then seen in Puerto Rico attempting to create an army of genetically enhanced monkeys called A.I.Monkeys to eliminate the recession in A.I.M., until he was defeated by Mister Fantastic, the Invisible Woman and the rookie Puerto Rican superhero known as El Vejigante. It is revealed that MODOK was involved in the creation of both the Red Hulk and the Red She-Hulk and is a member of the Intelligencia, a secret organization of genius-level supervillains.

During the "Fall of the Hulks" storyline, the Intelligencia captures some of the smartest men in the world and brought about the events that would lead up to the "World War Hulks" storyline. When several heroes are subjected by the Intelligencia to the Cathexis ray, which can transfer radiant energy from one subject to another, Amadeus Cho is affected as well. Cho gains the ability to warp reality within a 10-foot radius and restores MODOK to his human form, leaving him amnesiac.

=== MODOK Superior ===
M.O.D.O.K. Superior, as he appeared during his debut in Hulk (vol. 2) #29 (February 2011), art by Mark Robinson

Unknown to everyone, the doomsday plans left behind by MODOK actually serve as a distraction. The plans themselves are coordinated by a "cluster" of brains cloned from MODOK's own who act as one non-sentient supercomputer. This cluster is destroyed by the Red Hulk and the doomsday plans are stopped. However, one of the cloned brains, rather than being utilized as an organic computer, is allowed to develop naturally and then uploaded with MODOK's mind. This new MODOK calls himself MODOK Superior and prepares to make his own mark on the world independent of his predecessor. Cooperating with the Intelligencia once again, MODOK Superior and the Intelligencia attempt to study the body of a Spaceknight, which had crashed on Earth for unknown reasons. When the Avengers attempt to stop them, the body is revealed to be the latest vessel for the artificial consciousness of Ultron. In the battle with the Avengers, MODOK Superior takes on Thor, claiming he has the power of a god – and is immediately struck down as a result.

During the "Fear Itself" storyline, MODOK Superior reviews the attacks by Skadi and tells his followers that she is actually the Red Skull's daughter Sin, who has tapped into the powers of the Asgardians. He then views from his surveillance that the Red Hulk is fighting the Thing (in the form of Angrir: Breaker of Souls). When he learns that Zero/One and Black Fog are also after the Red Hulk, MODOK Superior plans to get to the Red Hulk first. MODOK Superior prevents the Black Fog from killing the Red Hulk. MODOK Superior becomes intangible to keep himself from getting attacked by Angrir (who shoots down Zero/One's Helicarrier). MODOK Superior encounters Zero/One and both of them declare a truce to help fight the soldiers of the Serpent. During that time, MODOK Superior starts to develop a crush on Zero/One.

In the prologue to the Avengers vs. X-Men storyline, MODOK Superior targets an ex-A.I.M. scientist named Dr. Udaku who was being escorted to the Pentagon by Wakandan forces. Before MODOK Superior could kill Udaku, the Scarlet Witch arrives and fights MODOK Superior, while smaller MODOK pawns surround the Scarlet Witch. In the nick of time, Ms. Marvel and Spider-Woman arrive and help to defeat MODOK Superior and A.I.M. MODOK Superior and a group of rogue A.I.M. agents work with S.H.I.E.L.D. to take down Andrew Forson, the then-current leader of A.I.M.

==== Agents of MODOK ====
After a brief retirement, MODOK Superior returned and organized a group of assassins called the Agents of MODOK (Mercenary Organization Dedicated Only to Killing) where they killed evil people. However, he made the mistake of recruiting Gwen Poole when she killed his top assassin and took credit for his kills. When he found out that she was not a superhuman and had no special training, he attempted to eliminate her, but she turned on him and sent him into outer space with an injured eye and damaged equipment. She then took over his organization for a brief time, but when her plans defeated a group of alien arms dealers and did not get them any money (having turned the client, an old Doombot who escaped from a fight in the past with Squirrel Girl, against them) the organization was disbanded and everyone went their separate ways. After reuniting, the organization faces off against MODOK Superior when he returns from outer space, who decides to flee rather than fight them.

MODOK Superior resurfaced in a new form during a confrontation with the newest incarnation of the West Coast Avengers (of which Gwen Poole is now a member), appearing as an attractive, long-haired man, calling himself BRODOK (Bio-Robotic Organism Designed Overwhelmingly for Kissing) and insisting that he was now reformed. The team eventually exposed his scheme to turn various citizens of Los Angeles into giant mindless monsters and defeated him, reverting him back to the traditional appearance that George Tarleton once had.

==== Family life ====
In the four-issue miniseries M.O.D.O.K.: Head Games, MODOK Superior begins to have vivid hallucinations of a family life with a human wife and son, named Jodie and Lou, and a similarly robot daughter named Melissa. Believing that he is malfunctioning, and his life threatened by Monica Rappaccini and the rest of A.I.M., MODOK Superior sets out to "fix" himself. After being briefly killed and resurrected by Gwen Poole, his search for answers leads him to his childhood home, where he is reunited with his father and A.I.M.'s true founder, Alvin Tarleton. Alvin reveals to MODOK Superior that he forced his son George to undergo the process of becoming the original MODOK against his will as, contrary to his origin, George was a rather inept employee at A.I.M. His wife Jodie was a manifestation of a program called JOD1E that was meant to sequester him. Now empowered with the knowledge of his true upbringing, MODOK Superior traps his father's consciousness inside his phone and uses the bodies of leftover Super-Adaptoids to create solidified and weaponized versions of his imaginary family.

== Powers, abilities, and equipment ==
George Tarleton was subjected to a mutagenic process that granted him hyper-intelligence, thus sacrificing his body in exchange for the world's most humungous brain. He possessed highly enhanced intuition, pattern solving, information storage/retrieval, and logical/philosophical structuring. His hunches were heightened to the degree that they were almost always correct. He could recall every moment with his perfect memory. However, his creativity remained at an average human level.

Courtesy of A.I.M. technology, MODOK wore a headband on his forehead that enabled him to focus his mental power into devastating energy beams variously known as "Brain-Beams" or "Mind-Beams". He had vast psionic abilities, allowing him to contact others through telepathy, mentally control individuals or large groups, and generate force fields strong enough to withstand minor nuclear explosions. A side effect of this mutation was also the enormous growth of Tarleton's head to the extent that his own body could no longer support its weight without assistance; thus, he relied on an exoskeleton and a hoverchair called the Doomsday Chair for support as well as movement. The Doomsday Chair was also equipped with destructive weapons, including missiles and lasers. Twice in his career, MODOK employed a large mechanical android body specially made so he could fit inside its head for greater mobility.

His internal organs also wore out quickly, necessitating the use of harvested clones which were utilized to sustain his life. As the leader of A.I.M., MODOK had advanced technology, vast resources, and a personal army at his disposal.

MODOK's successor, MODOK Superior, also has the same appearance, intellect, and powers as Tarleton did, but apparently none of his weaknesses.

== Reception ==
=== Accolades ===
- In 2014, IGN ranked MODOK 100th in their "Top 100 Comic Book Villains" list.
- In 2019, CBR.com ranked MODOK 18th in their "25 Smartest Characters In The Marvel Universe" list.
- In 2019, IGN ranked MODOK 25th in their "Top 25 Marvel Villains" list.
- In 2022, Screen Rant included MODOK in their "10 Smartest Marvel Telepaths" list.

== Related characters ==
=== MODOCs ===
Over the course of her two comic book series, Carol Danvers (Ms. Marvel) had several interactions with both A.I.M. and MODOK; among others, she was both saved from being disincorporated by 24 embryonic MODOCs who had been outfitted with reality-altering powers when working in unison and separated into two separate entities to fulfill her fondest wish. Also, reference was made by A.I.M. personnel to many actual MODOCs who functioned in the way that MODOK was originally supposed to have done (namely, as docile organic supercomputers).

=== MODOG ===
Iron Man has an encounter with MODOG (Mobile Organism Designed Only for Genocide) in The Invincible Iron Man (vol. 2) #2. Iron Man dispatches him easily, dumping him into outer space.

=== MODORD ===
A Dazzler-centered story, "Disco Highway", in issue #4 of the miniseries X-Men: Serve and Protect, released in February 2011, features a character named MODORD (Mental Organism Designed Only for Roller Derby).

=== MODOT ===
MODOT (Mobile Organism Designed Only for Talking), formerly Nobel Prize hopeful Dimitri Smirkov, appears in Howard the Duck (vol. 4) #1-4 (Nov. 2007-Feb. 2008) and, unlike his predecessor MODOK, can walk without the aid of a hoverchair. He had no designs of world conquest, but instead was only interested in making money; this may be because the branch of A.I.M. that created him did so specifically so he could talk the head office into increasing their budget. He ended up practically ruling the airwaves, influencing millions of viewers through 100 android hosts, anchormen and reporters, all controlled directly by him.

=== MODOK Junior ===
At least four versions of MODOK, apparently based around Elvis Presley, were created by the Beyond Corporation to defend their secret weapons factory, State 51. They were defeated by the Nextwave Squad. The following issue reveals that the Beyond Corporation is run by a disguised infant MODOK Junior, apparently conceived by a MODOK and a MODAM. This MODOK escapes the Nextwave Squad, but it is subsequently killed by its master, Devil Dinosaur.

== Other versions ==
Many alternate universe versions of MODOK have appeared throughout the character's publication history. In the Amalgam Comics universe, H.E.C.T.O.R. (Highly Evolved Creature Totally Oriented for Revenge) is a composite character based on MODOK and DC Comics character Hector Hammond. During the Secret Wars storyline, several alternate universe versions of MODOK appear as residents of the domains of Battleworld. In the series Spider-Gwen, Captain America fights against a MODOK-like character named MODAAK (Mental Organism Designed As America's King). Writer Jason Latour based this version of MODOK on then-U.S. Presidential candidate Donald Trump. The Ultimate Marvel version of MODOK features in the title Ultimate Vision, where he experiments with a Gah Lak Tus probe. He is initially a humanoid cyborg, but is eventually reduced to a disembodied head after being infected by Gah Lak Tus.

== In other media ==
=== Television ===
- MODOK appears in Iron Man (1994), voiced by Jim Cummings. This version was a scientist who married supermodel Alana Ulanova before his jealous superior, the Red Ghost, turned him into MODOK. Seeking a cure, MODOK joined and became subservient to the Mandarin.
- MODOC appears in Iron Man: Armored Adventures, voiced by Lee Tockar. This version was created by A.I.M.
- MODOK appears in The Super Hero Squad Show, voiced by Tom Kenny. This version is a member of Doctor Doom's Lethal Legion.
- MODOC appears in The Avengers: Earth's Mightiest Heroes, voiced by Wally Wingert. This version is a leading member of A.I.M.
- MODOK appears in Ultimate Spider-Man, voiced by Charlie Adler.
- MODOK appears in Avengers Assemble, voiced again by Charlie Adler. This version is the leader of A.I.M. and a founding member of the Cabal.
- MODOK appears in Phineas and Ferb: Mission Marvel, voiced again by Charlie Adler.
- MODOK appears in the Guardians of the Galaxy short "Star-Lord vs. MODOK", voiced again by Charlie Adler.
- MODOK appears in Marvel Disk Wars: The Avengers, voiced by Atsushi Imaruoka in the Japanese version and by Wally Wingert in the English version. This version is a member of the Masters of Evil.
- MODOK appears in Marvel Future Avengers, voiced again by Atsushi Imaruoka in the Japanese version and by Mick Wingert in the English version.
- MODOK appears in Spider-Man, voiced again by Charlie Adler. This version was created by A.I.M. using robotics technology and stolen mental projection devices.
- MODOK appears in a self-titled TV series, voiced by Patton Oswalt. This version has a family, consisting of wife Jodie Ramirez-Tarleton, son Louis "Lou" Tarleton, and daughter Melissa Tarleton, the last of whom shares his appearance. Additionally, a time-displaced college-aged version of MODOK called the Anomaly (also voiced by Oswalt) appears throughout the series.

=== Marvel Cinematic Universe ===
Multiple original incarnations of MODOK appear or were considered to appear in media set in the Marvel Cinematic Universe (MCU):

- MODOK was first considered to appear in Iron Man (2008) in a script written by Jeff Vintar and Stan Lee for 20th Century Fox before the film began redevelopment at Marvel Studios. MODOK was considered to appear during early development of Captain America: The Winter Soldier (2014), with Peter Dinklage considered for the role, but was cut from the final draft in favor of Alexander Pierce (portrayed by Robert Redford).
- MODOK appears in Iron Man 3: The Official Game, voiced by Nick Sullivan. This version is Aldrich Killian, who transferred his consciousness into MODOK before his death in Iron Man 3.
- In early 2017, Marvel Studios granted the production team of Agents of S.H.I.E.L.D. permission to use MODOK and introduced Anton Ivanov / the Superior (portrayed by Zach McGowan) in the series' fourth season with the intention of having him become MODOK in the fifth season until Marvel Studios retracted access to the character. As a prelude to his cancelled future role as MODOK, Ivanov was reduced to a disembodied brain in a vat and given control over Life Model Decoys Designed Only for Killing (L-MODDOKs) made in his image.
- The New Warriors pilot featured Keith David as an original character named Ernest Vigman, who would eventually become MODOK. However, the pilot did not go to a series.
- MODOK debuts in the film Ant-Man and the Wasp: Quantumania, portrayed by Corey Stoll. This version is Darren Cross, who shrank uncontrollably into the Quantum Realm following his defeat in the film Ant-Man (2015). The uneven nature of his shrinking resulted in him gaining an oversized head before he was outfitted with cybernetic implants by Kang the Conqueror, whom MODOK serves.

=== Video games ===
- MODOK appears as a boss in Marvel: Ultimate Alliance, voiced by Michael Gough. This version is a member of Doctor Doom's Masters of Evil.
- MODOK appears in Marvel Super Hero Squad, voiced again by Tom Kenny.
- MODOK appears in Marvel Super Hero Squad: The Infinity Gauntlet, voiced again by Tom Kenny.
- MODOK appears as a playable character in Marvel vs. Capcom 3: Fate of Two Worlds and Ultimate Marvel vs. Capcom 3, voiced again by Wally Wingert.
- MODOK appears as an unlockable playable character in Marvel Super Hero Squad Online, voiced again by Tom Kenny.
- MODOK appears as a boss in Marvel Super Hero Squad: Comic Combat, voiced again by Tom Kenny.
- MODOK appears as a boss in Marvel Avengers Alliance.
- MODOK appears as a boss in Marvel Heroes, voiced by Nick Jameson.
- MODOK appears as a boss and an unlockable playable character in Lego Marvel Super Heroes, voiced by Dave Boat.
- MODOK appears in Disney Infinity 2.0, voiced again by Charlie Adler.
- MODOK appears as an unlockable playable character in Marvel Future Fight.
- MODOK appears as an unlockable playable character in Lego Marvel's Avengers, voiced again by Charlie Adler. This version claims to have reformed as he now works as a janitor at S.H.I.E.L.D.'s headquarters. To reflect this, the "K" in his name now stands for "Kleaning", even though he knows this is grammatically incorrect.
- MODOK appears as an unlockable playable character in Marvel Avengers Academy, voiced by Mar Andersons.
- MODOK appears in Marvel vs. Capcom: Infinite, voiced again by Wally Wingert. This version is the leader of A.I.M.brella.
- MODOK appears as an unlockable playable character in Lego Marvel Super Heroes 2, voiced by Christopher Ragland.
- MODOK appears as an unlockable playable character in Marvel Contest of Champions.
- MODOK appears as a boss in Marvel Ultimate Alliance 3: The Black Order, voiced again by Wally Wingert.
- MODOK appears as an unlockable playable character in Marvel Puzzle Quest.
- MODOK appears as the final boss of Marvel's Avengers, voiced by Usman Ally. This version is the founder of A.I.M. who seeks to cleanse Earth of superpowered individuals and build a world protected by science.
- MODOK appears in Marvel Cosmic Invasion, voiced by Trevor Devall.

=== Merchandise ===
- Toy Biz produced a MODOK action figure for the 1994 Iron Man animated series tie-in toy line.
- In 2006, Toy Biz produced a "Build-A-Figure" MODOK figure for Wave 15 of their Marvel Legends toyline.
- In 2010, Hasbro produced a MODOK figure for its revised Super Hero Squad line, packaged with Iron Man.
- In 2014, LEGO released the "Hulk Lab Smash" set for its Marvel Super Heroes theme, which introduced MODOK as a new mini-figure. In 2020, a new brick-built variant of MODOK was released in the Avengers Helicarrier set.
- In 2011, Bowen Designs released a statue of MODOK that was designed and sculpted by the Kucharek brothers.
- In 2021, a new MODOK figure was released by Hasbro as part of a revival of the Marvel Legends toyline.

== Collected editions ==
Title	Material collected	Published date	ISBN
Super-Villain Team-Up: MODOK's 11	Super-Villain Team-Up: MODOK's 11 #1–5	February 20, 2008	978-0785119920
M.O.D.O.K.: Assassin	M.O.D.O.K.: Assassin #1–5	January 7, 2016	978-0785198765
M.O.D.O.K.: Head Trips	Captain America #133; Incredible Hulk #287–290; Iron Man Annual #4; Super-Villain Team-Up: MODOK's 11 #1–5; Fantastic Four in...Ataque del M.O.D.O.K.! #1; Marvel Adventures: The Avengers #9; M.O.D.O.K.: Assassin #1–5; material from Tales of Suspense #93–94	December 10, 2019	978-1302920746
M.O.D.O.K.: Head Games	M.O.D.O.K.: Head Games #1–4; M.O.D.O.K.: Reign Delay #1; Fall of the Hulks: M.O.D.O.K. #1	May 20, 2021	978-1302924904
