= Scientist Supreme =

Marvel Comics character

The Scientist Supreme is the name of several characters appearing in American comic books published by Marvel Comics.

== Description ==
The Scientist Supreme is often depicted as the leader of A.I.M. and can also be described as the scientific counterpart to Earth's Sorcerer Supreme.

== Known versions ==
=== Lyle Getz ===
Scientist Supreme

Publication information
- Publisher: Marvel Comics
- First appearance: Captain America #133 (January 1971)
- Created by: Stan Lee; Gene Colan

In-story information
- Alter ego: Lyle Getz
- Team affiliations: A.I.M.
- Abilities: Genius-level intellect

Lyle Getz was the first individual to use the Scientist Supreme alias within A.I.M. He spearheaded and supervised the experiment of MODOK, who later kills him.

=== George Clinton ===
Scientist Supreme

Publication information
- Publisher: Marvel Comics
- First appearance: Super-Villain Team Up #17 (June 1980)
- Created by: Jim Shooter; Peter Gillis

In-story information
- Alter ego: George Clinton
- Team affiliations: A.I.M.
- Abilities: Genius-level intellect

George Clinton was the third individual to use the Scientist Supreme persona within A.I.M. He provided the Red Skull, Arnim Zola and the Hate-Monger with a restored version of the Cosmic Cube, but has his mind drained as a power source for the Cosmic Cube.

=== Valdemar Tykkio ===
Scientist Supreme

Publication information
- Publisher: Marvel Comics
- First appearance: Iron Man #201 (December 1985)
- Created by: Jim Shooter; Denny O'Neil

In-story information
- Alter ego: Valdemar Tykkio
- Team affiliations: A.I.M.
- Abilities: Genius-level intellect

Valdemar Tykkio was the fourth individual to use the Scientist Supreme persona within A.I.M. Valdemar had occasional encounters with Iron Man while dealing with his brother Yorgon Tykkio trying to take his coveted position. Tykkio later had a deal with Hydra to eliminate Madame Masque, resulting in a confrontation with Iron Man and the Hulk.

=== Andrew Forson ===
Andrew Forson

Publication information
- Publisher: Marvel Comics
- First appearance: Fantastic Four #610 (November 2012)
- Created by: Jonathan Hickman; Ryan Stegman

In-story information
- Team affiliations: A.I.M. Cult of Entropy
- Abilities: Genius-level intellect

Andrew Forson is the seventh character within A.I.M. to use the Scientist Supreme title. The character first appeared in Fantastic Four #610 and was created by Jonathan Hickman and Ryan Stegman.

Forson was the Scientist Supreme of A.I.M. after the organization went public and established their base in Barbuda. Forson later appears as the Supreme Leader of the new High Council of A.I.M.

Forson finds Superia badly injured after an incident on A.I.M. Island regarding an escaped creature. An A.I.M. agent approaches Forson and Superia, showing the two a hologram of the creature beating the Avengers. Taking pride in this, Forson orders their translocator activated and to retrieve their "lost child".

Forson and A.I.M. use a device to accelerate the flow of time on A.I.M. Island, creating in a matter of hours for the real world year of progress and transforming A.I.M. into a technologically advanced empire.

== Other versions ==
An unnamed Scientist Supreme, referred to as #1983, appears in The Ultimates #14.

== In other media ==
=== Television ===
- The Lyle Getz incarnation of the Scientist Supreme appears in Iron Man: Armored Adventures, voiced by John Payne. In the episodes "Ready, A.I.M., Fire" and "Designed Only For Chaos", he assists his fellow A.I.M. operatives in building MODOC, who later kills him.
- The Valdemar Tykkio and Lyle Getz incarnations of the Scientist Supreme appear in The Avengers: Earth's Mightiest Heroes, respectively voiced by Nolan North and Kyle Hebert.
- The George Clinton incarnation of the Scientist Supreme appears in the Avengers Assemble episode "Adapting to Change", voiced by Jim Meskimen.
- The Monica Rappaccini incarnation of the Scientist Supreme appears in Spider-Man, voiced by Grey DeLisle.
- The Monica Rappaccini incarnation of the Scientist Supreme appears in M.O.D.O.K., voiced by Wendi McLendon-Covey.

=== Video games ===
- The Andrew Forson incarnation of the Scientist Supreme appears in Marvel Avengers Academy. This version is the headmaster of the A.I.M. Institute of Super-Technology in addition to being the leader of A.I.M.
- The Lyle Getz and Monica Rappaccini incarnations of the Scientist Supreme appear in Marvel's Avengers, voiced by Darin De Paul and Jolene Andersen respectively.
- The Monica Rappaccini incarnation of the Scientist Supreme appears in Marvel Powers United VR, voiced by Jennifer Hale.
- The Monica Rappaccini incarnation of the Scientist Supreme appears in Marvel Strike Force.

== See also ==
- Sorcerer Supreme - A magical counterpart of the Scientist Supreme.
