= List of Captain America enemies =

This is a list of Captain America's enemies.

== A ==
- Adolf Hitler: the leader of Nazi Germany "Mein Führer" who wanted to rule the world and kill all Jews and other minorities during World War II.
- Aleksander Lukin: Soviet strategist and mastermind.
- Americop: A former police officer turned ruthless vigilante.
- Ameridroid: A 20-foot-tall android built to resemble Captain America, controlled by the brain of former Nazi spy Lyle Dekker.
- Armadillo: A superpowered criminal with an armadillo's physiology.
- Arnim Zola: Nazi biochemist who became the first human genetic engineer in history.

== B ==
- Baron Blood: Lord John Falsworth, an English aristocrat, who sought out Count Dracula and was turned into a vampire by him.
- Baron Strucker: The founder of Hydra and longtime foe of both Captain America and Nick Fury's S.H.I.E.L.D.
- Baron Zemo: Heinrich Zemo was one of the elite Nazi scientists during World War II. After his death, his son Helmut Zemo took on the role and continued a heated rivalry with Captain America; he has teetered between heroism and villainy due to his association with the Thunderbolts, an ultimately reformed version of the Masters of Evil that took on false hero guises in the 1990s absence of the Fantastic Four, the Avengers and other high-profile heroes.
- Batroc the Leaper: A French mercenary and leader of his own brigade of criminals, Batroc's Brigade.
- Black Talon: A World War II era criminal mastermind and Nazi sympathizer.
- Blackwing: Costumed supervillain and the son of Silvermane, also a former member of the Skeleton Crew.
- Blistik: A tech-based vigilante who stood for "the quality of life" of the residents of New York City.
- Blue Streak: Former spy turn costumed operative of the subversive organization called The Corporation.

== C ==
- Cache: A supercomputer come to life with ultimate knowledge of any data that is in the internet universe.
- Constrictor is a character that went on to feature as a supervillain in Captain America #228-229, #231 (1978–1979)
- The Corporation: A business-like criminal organization, which employed numerous supervillains against heroes across the nation. Captain America did battle with many of their surrogates, including Blue Streak, Night Flyer, Ameridroid and Vamp/Animus.
- Crime Wave: A short-lived union of costumed supervillains (Eel, Plantman, Scarecrow, Porcupine and Viper) under the leadership of the Cowled Commander.
- Crossbones: The chief henchman of the Red Skull. Publicly responsible for the assassination of Steve Rogers in the aftermath of the superhero Civil War.
- Cutthroat: Costumed supervillain once associated with the Red Skull's Skeleton Crew. He is the brother of former Serpent Society member (and Captain America paramour) Diamondback.

== D ==
- Dead Ringer: A criminal who uses his power of necromimickry to take on the appearance and abilities of deceased individuals. Friend and former ally of Mike Farrell, the second Super-Patriot
- Death-Throws: A team of five costumed jugglers (Bombshell, Knickknack, Oddball, Ringleader & Tenpin) who used their skills to commit crime.
- Doctor Faustus: A psychiatrist and criminal mastermind, commonly allied with the Red Skull and Arnim Zola. His psychological manipulation of Sharon Carter led to her killing Steve Rogers.
- Dredmund the Druid: A master in the magical and mystical arts bent on Earth domination. Attained the power of the Moongem and for a short time became the Starwolf.
- Dr. Cedric Rawlings: A former mad scientist who developed rocket technology for the Nazis.

== E ==
- Everyman: Larry Ekler, a self-professed "defender of the common people". Later went by the name Zeitgeist.
- Exile

== F ==
- Flag-Smasher: A Swiss terrorist, determined to unite the Earth by destroying nationalities.

== G ==
- Golddiger: An athlete and martial artist. She later appears as a member of the Femizons.
- Grand Director: The leader of the neo-Nazi group the National Force.

== H ==
- Hate-Monger: A clone of Adolf Hitler.
- Heinz Kruger: The Nazi agent who murdered Abraham Erskine after the process that turned Steve Rogers into Captain America was completed.
  - Heinz Kruger appears in Captain America: The First Avenger, portrayed by Richard Armitage. This version is a Hydra agent who works undercover in Brooklyn as "Fred Clemson", a U.S. State Department representative, to assassinate Abraham Erskine.
- Hydra: A criminal and terrorist organization dedicated to the achievement of Earth domination through terrorist and subversive activities on various fronts, resulting in a fascist New World Order.

== J ==
- Jack O'Lantern: Former member of the Skeleton Crew. One of several individuals (mainly connected to Spider-Man) who used the Jack O'Lantern moniker.

== K ==
- Karl Stryker: A Nazi sympathizer who used a hydraulics-powered combat suit to combat Captain America. His son Viktor took revenge on Captain America soon after, but was killed in the process.
- King Cobra: Costumed supervillain, known for a phenomenal (mutated) mastery of his musculature in combat situations, member of the original Serpent Squad, and member of the Serpent Society. Also worked commonly alongside Mister Hyde against Captain America and other heroes.
- Kligger: Former leader of the Corporation, the criminal guise of Senator Eugene Stivak. Often accompanied by his aide Veda (who he personally killed when she eventually gave up her allegiance to the organization).
- Kingpin: A crime lord whom Captain America has fought many times.

== M ==
- Machinesmith: A master robot-maker (once a villain known as Starr Saxon) who became a living, cybernetic-system program (artificial consciousness), equipped to transmit itself into virtually any electronics system at will.
- Madame Hydra: Leader of Hydra. She is also known as the second Viper.
- Master Man: A Nazi super-soldier who, like Steve Rogers, was enhanced by a Nazi version of the American super-soldier serum.
- Minister Blood: Hypnotist agent of the Red Skull. Brother of Mother Night.
- Mister Hyde: Chemically enhanced supervillain. Worked commonly alongside King Cobra against superheroes, especially Captain America.
- MODAM (Mental Organism Designed for Aggressive Maneuvers): A female A.I.M. agent who, like MODOK, was originally a tech agent for the organization mutated for various offensive measures against their enemies.
- MODOK (Mental Organism Designed Only for Killing): A former A.I.M. tech transformed with advanced mutagenics into the organization's leader. Later disassociated itself from A.I.M. and works alongside other "genius-level" villains in the Marvel Universe.
- Mother Night: Ally of the Red Skull and Crossbones, former leader of the Sisters of Sin and former member of the Skeleton Crew. Sister of Minister Blood.

== N ==
- Nefarius: Affiliated with the Secret Empire under the name Moonstone, he planned to damage Cap's reputation by accusing him of vigilantism.
- Nightshade: Female mad scientist who uses biochemistry and robotics to commit her schemes.

== P ==
- Porcupine: A weapons designer clad in "porcupine-like" battle armor.
- Protocide: Clinton McIntyre, a brutally savage soldier who was accused of murdering his commanding officer while rebelling against orders. He was used as the first test subject of the Super Soldier Serum, but placed into stasis when the experiment failed. He is revived by A.I.M. who hope to use him against Captain America by playing upon his unstable mental state. His costume is dark red with a white five-point star across the chest and another smaller star over the left eye of his mask. He uses a white V-shaped shield with two red stripes running from the top to a blue field at the point containing a single white star. The shield is highly durable, able to withstand blasts of energy without damage, and Protocide can use the point as a stabbing weapon.

== R ==
- Red Guardian: Soviet equivalent to Captain America and a Cold War rival.
- Red Skull: Captain America's archenemy, a Nazi super-soldier and Hitler's successor.

== S ==
- Scourges of the Underworld: A cadre of supervillain killers who originally tackled, and were often confronted by, Captain America and his allies.
- Secret Empire: A terrorist organization, led by a series of individuals called Number One (one of whom was implied to be a high-level U.S. government official).
- Sensational Hydra: A Skrull infiltrator of Hydra who battled Captain America and the Avengers.
- Serpent Squad: A group of snake-themed supervillains.
- Serpent Society: A larger group of snake-themed supervillains.
- Sidewinder: The creator and original leader of the Serpent Society. The original Sidewinder, Seth Voelker, has since retired and reformed; he has been succeeded in the identity by at least two others.
- Sisters of Sin: A quasi-religious cult, created by the Red Skull, that promoted hatred and violence.
- Sin: Daughter of the Red Skull.
- Sleepers: A series of five doomsday robots designed and entombed by Nazi Germany to wreak havoc on society in future years.
- Selene: Selene Gallio is a mutant with an array of powers including telepathy and the ability to absorb the lifeforce from other beings.
- Superia: Leader of the Femizons, a group of female supervillains. Later a member of Norman Osborn's Dark Avengers.
- Super Patriot: John Walker was Captain America's replacement during the 1980s (when his removal from his hero role was orchestrated by the Red Skull). He was an unwitting rival to Steve Rogers, but nonetheless a hero in his own right, and ultimately, he became an ally to Captain America as the renamed U.S. Agent.
- Swine: Hector Santiago is the dictator of Rio De Muerte ("River of Death"), slavemaster and leader of a small private army.

== T ==
- Taskmaster: Costumed supervillain with the uncanny ability to replicate his enemies' fighting techniques. Also, a trainer of supervillains, employed by criminal organizations and other supervillains.
- The Man With No Face: Created by Zhang Chin and failed as an experiment in 1950. Villain to the new Captain America.
- Tumbler: A costumed criminal acrobat.

== U ==
- Ultimatum: A terrorist organization headed by Flag-Smasher.

== V ==
- Vamp: A former member of the Corporation, who briefly infiltrated S.H.I.E.L.D. as a super-powered hero. She possessed a monstrous alter ego called Animus.
- Vermin: Former geneticist mutated by Baron Zemo and Primus into a murderous rat-like creature.
- Viper: Costumed villain, brother of the original Eel.

== W ==
- Watchdogs: A racially motivated terrorist organization opposed to controversial subjects in American culture.
- Winter Soldier: Codename used for Cap's former WWII partner Bucky Barnes, who was thought to be dead, had actually survived and was transformed into a notorious, mysterious Soviet assassin who operated for decades. Ultimately overcame his Soviet reprogramming to become Cap's ally (and for a time the new Captain America) once again.

== Y ==
- Yellow Claw: Criminal mastermind of Communist China.

== See also ==
- List of Iron Man supporting characters
- List of Iron Man enemies
