= Arnim Zola =

Marvel Comics supervillain

- Arnim Zola as depicted in Captain America vol. 5 #42 (November 2008). Art by Steve Epting.

Publication information
- Publisher: Marvel Comics
- First appearance: Captain America and the Falcon #208 (April 1977)
- Created by: Jack Kirby

In-story information
- Species: Human mutate-cyborg
- Team affiliations: Hydra
- Partnerships: Red Skull
- Notable aliases: The Bio-Fanatic
- Abilities: Genius biochemist and scientist; Specially modified robot body grants: Superhuman strength and durability; ESP Box; Mind control; Mind ray; Mind transfer

Arnim Zola is a supervillain appearing in American comic books by Marvel Comics. He is a master of biochemistry and a recurring enemy of Captain America and the Avengers. The character first appeared in Captain America and the Falcon #208 (April 1977), and was created by writer/artist Jack Kirby. When introduced, Zola is a former Nazi scientist who experimented with genetic engineering during World War II. His skills as a geneticist drew the attention of the Red Skull, who recruited him into Hydra to aid their efforts to create super soldiers. One of his experiments led to the brain of Adolf Hitler being copied into a being later known as Hate-Monger. Later in life, Zola transferred his own mind into a sophisticated robot body which protected it by storing it in its chest and displaying a digital image of Zola's face on its chest plate. This robot body allowed Zola to survive until modern times, as whenever it was destroyed, Zola could simply upload his consciousness into a new body.

Zola has appeared in several forms of media outside of comics. He made his live-action debut in the television film Nick Fury: Agent of S.H.I.E.L.D. (1998), portrayed by Peter Haworth, and appears in media set in the Marvel Cinematic Universe (MCU), portrayed by Toby Jones. Additionally, Grant Moninger, Mark Hamill and Trevor Devall have voiced Zola in animation.

== Publication history ==
Arnim Zola was created by Jack Kirby, and he first appeared in Captain America and the Falcon #208 (April 1977).

== Fictional character biography ==
Arnim Zola was a Swiss biochemist during World War II who became one of the first human genetic engineers in history after finding papers and equipment used by the offshoot race of humanity known as the Deviants. He finds a ready home among the Nazi Party, who see his experiments as a means to ensure the existence of the Master Race.

One of his first accomplishments is the creation of a brain pattern imprinting device, which allows a person's mental essence to be projected into a cloned brain. Zola uses this machine on Adolf Hitler, creating the Hate-Monger. Zola was later approached by Baron Strucker into taking part in the establishment of Hydra.

The Red Skull also financed some of Zola's experiments, allowing him to create Primus, Doughboy, and Man-Fish. During one such experiment, Zola collects humans from the rubble of New York City after the devastation caused by Onslaught. Zola endows a teenager with superpowers, creating the hero known as Jolt, who is eventually stopped by the Thunderbolts. Zola also collected DNA samples of Captain America at the time when Red Skull's body began to age rapidly and used this template to create a new body for him.

In the aftermath of "Civil War", Zola joins the Red Skull in his newest attempt to kill Captain America, which succeeds. Afterwards, while Red Skull is busy with his plans to control America with a puppet government, Zola attempts to reverse-engineer a mysterious device given to him by Doctor Doom, as well as craft a device that will separate the Skull's consciousness from Aleksander Lukin. He manages to unlock the device's secrets and has a brainwashed Sharon Carter hooked up to it. However, she breaks off the connection as S.H.I.E.L.D. agents storm the base. Zola quickly transfers Red Skull out of Lukin but his body is destroyed by the Grand Director. Red Skull was then stuck in one of Zola's robot bodies.

In the "Dark Reign" storyline, Zola is located by Norman Osborn. He informs the current director of H.A.M.M.E.R. that Captain America is locked in space and time on the date of his supposed death. Doom's machine was meant to bring him back for an unknown purpose but because of Sharon, he has become unstuck in time, causing him to relive the events of World War II. By the time Zola rebuilds the machine in Castle Doom, Sharon Carter is brought to him so that he can transfer the Red Skull's mind into her body.

Captain America finds Zola hiding in an alternate dimension known as Dimension Z, where time moves at a faster rate than on Earth. There, Zola has built a massive fortress and an army of genetically altered soldiers with the intent of conquering Earth. In the initial assault, Cap rescues a genetically engineered infant boy (Zola's son Leopold). In the decade stranded in Dimension Z, Cap raises the boy as his son, Ian. The two take up with the peaceful Phrox, and eventually lead a rebellion to stop Zola's forces, now commanded by Zola's daughter Jet Black. Ian is later captured by Zola and brainwashed to accept him as his father again. He breaks out of his control, only to be shot by Sharon Carter. Sharon sacrifices herself to destroy Zola and his fortress, allowing Cap and a reformed Jet to return to Earth, where only seconds have passed since the former's arrival in Dimension Z.

During the "AXIS" storyline, Red Skull tells Arnim Zola that everything is in place on his end. Zola is confronted by Jet, who refuses to return to his side. Falcon sneak attacks Zola. Ian finds and frees Sharon Carter, only to learn that Zola has a bomb strong enough to destroy all of New York City. Falcon removes the telepathic antenna on Zola's body to stop him from controlling the bomb, but it only sets the bomb to activate. Falcon takes the bomb high into the sky above New York before it goes off. After the Unvengers are defeated, Zola flees with Jet.

Arnim Zola later appears as a member of Hydra's High Council when the Red Skull uses Kobik to rewrite history and make Captain America a Hydra sleeper agent.

=== Arnim Zola 4.2.3 ===
A flawed copy of Arnim Zola's consciousness later joins the Shadow Council and battles the Secret Avengers, who are investigating the group's operations.

== Powers and abilities ==
Arnim Zola has no natural superpowers, but is a scientific genius and biochemist specializing in genetics and cloning. His android body gives him the ability to control the minds of others, generate mental blasts, and transfer his consciousness into another body if destroyed.

== Other versions ==
=== Secret Wars ===
An alternate universe version of Arnim Zola from Earth-85826 appears in the Secret Wars tie-in series Hail Hydra. This version is the leader of Hydra.

=== Spider-Gwen ===
An alternate universe version of Arnim Zola from Earth-65 appears in Spider-Gwen.

=== Ultimate Marvel ===
An alternate universe version of Arnim Zola from Earth-1610 appears in Ultimates Annual #2. This version is an artificial intelligence based on the real Zola created by the O.S.S. Additionally, a character based on Zola named Arnim Zola III appears in Ultimate Mystery as a member of Roxxon's brain trust.

== In other media ==
=== Television ===
- Arnim Zola makes a non-speaking appearance in a flashback in The Super Hero Squad Show episode "Wrath of the Red Skull!".
- Arnim Zola appears in The Avengers: Earth's Mightiest Heroes, voiced by Grant Moninger. This version is a member of the Enchantress's Masters of Evil and a former inmate of the Big House.
- Arnim Zola appears in Ultimate Spider-Man, voiced by Mark Hamill.
- Arnim Zola appears in Avengers Assemble, voiced again by Mark Hamill. This version is a member of the Cabal.
- Arnim Zola appears in the Spider-Man episode "Spider-Island", voiced again by Mark Hamill.
- Arnim Zola appears in Marvel Future Avengers, voiced by Volcano Ota in the original Japanese version and Kirk Thornton in the English dub.
- Zola appears in Spidey and His Amazing Friends, voiced by Trevor Devall. This version is a robot with extendable limbs who can possess electronic devices and is assisted by three smaller robots called Hydrabots.

=== Film ===
Arnim Zola appears in Nick Fury: Agent of S.H.I.E.L.D., portrayed by Peter Haworth. This version is an elderly Hydra chemist who created the "Death's Head virus" and was recruited back into Hydra by Viper.

=== Marvel Cinematic Universe ===
Toby Jones as Arnim Zola in Captain America: The First Avenger.

Arnim Zola appears in media set in the Marvel Cinematic Universe (MCU), portrayed by Toby Jones. Following his first appearance in Captain America: The First Avenger, Zola appears in the Agent Carter episode "Valediction" and Captain America: The Winter Soldier. Additionally, alternate reality versions of Zola appear in What If...?.

=== Video games ===
- Arnim Zola appears as a boss in Iron Man and X-O Manowar in Heavy Metal, voiced by Tim Jones.
- Arnim Zola, based on the MCU incarnation, appears as a boss in Captain America: Super Soldier, voiced by André Sogliuzzo.
- Arnim Zola appears as a boss in Marvel Avengers Alliance.
- Arnim Zola appears as an unlockable playable character in Lego Marvel Super Heroes, voiced by Robin Atkin Downes.
- An amalgamated incarnation of Arnim Zola appears as an unlockable playable character in Lego Marvel's Avengers, voiced again by Mark Hamill. This version's human body is based on the MCU incarnation while his robot body is based on the original comics design.
- Arnim Zola appears as an unlockable playable character in Lego Marvel Super Heroes 2.
- Arnim Zola appears as a boss in Marvel Future Revolution.

=== Miscellaneous ===
Arnim Zola appears in Ant-Man and The Wasp: Nano Battle!, portrayed again by Toby Jones.
