= William Burnside (character) =

Marvel Comics character

- William Burnside, PhD, as he appeared prior to the surgical alterations on his features, in Captain America #155 (November 1972 Marvel Comics). Art by Sal Buscema and Frank McLaughlin.

Publication information
- Publisher: Marvel Comics
- First appearance: Captain America #153 (Sept. 1972). (Captain America stories from Young Men #24 (Dec. 1953) through to 1955 retroactively ascribed to the character)
- Created by: As Captain America: Steve Englehart; Sal Buscema; As The Grand Director: Roger McKenzie; Jim Shooter

In-story information
- Alter ego: William Burnside, PhD.; legally changed to Steven "Steve" Rogers
- Species: Human mutate
- Team affiliations: United States Government; National Force
- Notable aliases: Captain America
- Abilities: Trained boxer Superhuman strength Peak-level speed, agility, dexterity, reflexes, coordination, balance and endurance Access to various forms of advanced technology As Captain America: Wears a chain-mail costume Carries a bulletproof steel shield (Briefly): Use of an "atom-blaster" weapon

William Burnside, PhD, also known as the Captain America of the 1950s, Commie Smasher or Bad Cap, is a fictional character appearing in American comic books published by Marvel Comics.

He was created by writer Steve Englehart and artist Sal Buscema in Captain America #153–156 (Sept.–Dec. 1972) as an explanation for discrepancies in the fictional timeline for Marvel Comics. Captain America and Bucky were depicted in Young Men during the 1950s, but later official Marvel continuity established in The Avengers #4 from 1963 said Captain America disappeared near the end of World War II and was in suspended animation until the 1960s. The creation of Burnside allowed for the explanation, through retroactive continuity, that the 1950s Captain America was a different person from the original Captain America. Since this revelation, the Burnside character became a foil personality to his predecessor, serving as an example of what Captain America could have become and as a reactionary bigot driven violently insane by the same experimental procedure that created the original Captain America.

In a later storyline, Burnside was given a new white costume and the title The Grand Director by Buscema and writers Roger McKenzie and Jim Shooter, in Captain America #232 (April 1979), and altered to be a villain and leader of a group of white supremacists that included a brainwashed Sharon Carter. The character was killed off at the end of that storyline and not used again until Captain America vol. 5 #42, returning to being active as the Captain America of the 1950s separate from the then-current Captain America, James "Bucky" Barnes.

== Publication history ==
The apparent return of Captain America and Bucky, in Young Men #25 (Dec. 1953) by Stan Lee and John Romita, Sr.

A character with a complicated history, William Burnside's origin lies in discrepancies that crept up in the history of Captain America.

As a character, Captain America had been continuously published from 1941 until 1949. He was then revived unsuccessfully in 1953 in Young Men #24–28 (Dec. 1953– May 1954) by Stan Lee with Mort Lawrence and John Romita, Sr. These stories starred the original Captain America and Bucky in both their civilian and superhero guises, and were clearly set in the 1950s, with the character prominently battling communism and a communist Red Skull. The character also made appearances in Men's Adventures #27–28 (May–July 1954) and Captain America Comics #76–78 (May–Sept. 1954).

However, when Lee revived the Captain America concept a second time in 1964, he either ignored or forgot about the 1950s stories. When the character reappears in The Avengers #4 (March, 1964) Lee reveals that the original Captain America had fallen into a state of suspended animation after a battle he fought near the end of World War II in 1945.

The 1950s stories were thus considered outside of the official canon until Englehart's 1972 Captain America storyline. This attempted to resolve the discrepancy by revealing how an unnamed man, and his teenaged student, had assumed both the public and private identities of the original Captain America and Bucky. This was part of a government-sponsored program which planned to replace the lost heroes to combat the "red threat" (i.e., communism). However, as Englehart's 1972 story reveals, the treatment, which these individuals underwent to replicate the original Captain America and Bucky's abilities, was flawed (as the vital Vita-Ray radiological component was left out) and, as a side-effect, they developed psychotic symptoms. Consequently, the government placed them in suspended animation in the mid-1950s (only for an undisclosed jingoistic individual to revive them, decades later in contemporary times, to battle the original Captain America).

This complicated origin is the reason that some sources list Young Men #24 as this character's first appearance, when in fact this, and subsequent 1950s-published Captain America stories, was clearly created with the intention of depicting the original Captain America. Englehart's story was somewhat controversial; many praised it as accounting for a discrepancy in Marvel continuity in a way that expanded the Captain America cast, but a number of fans who had followed the 1950s Captain America adventures were dismayed by the revelation that their hero was just a well-meaning imposter.

A 1977 story, What If #4 (Aug. 1977), introduces two other, previous Captain Americas - William Naslund, appointed by Truman in 1945 to succeed the original Captain America, and Jeff Mace, who succeeds Naslund as Cap in the spring of 1946 after Naslund is killed in action. These versions of the character were created to resolve the discrepancy created by the Captain America stories which had been published between 1945–1949 in the newer, post-The Avengers #4 continuity. Though depicted in an issue of the What If? series, this story was explicitly noted as taking place as part of the formal canon.

The 1950s Captain America was known for a time as Captain America IV. In later years, yet earlier Captain Americas were introduced, obscuring their numbering, though most of these other, later-introduced Captains are not formally part of the recognized lineage (such as the Revolutionary War-era ancestor of Steve Rogers). Many recognize this character today with the specific terms 1950s Captain America, Captain America of the 1950s, or "Grand Director" to distinguish him from the World War II Steve Rogers. In 2010 the character's birth name ("William Burnside") was revealed in Captain America #602.

== Fictional character biography ==
The Captain America of the 1950s (later named William Burnside, PhD.), as he appeared on the cover of Captain America #154 (October 1972), serving as an opposite to the World War II's iteration's. Art by Sal Buscema.

Having idolized the original Captain America to the point of obsession, William Burnside focused his life in an intense analysis of American history. He attains a PhD in American History in the early 1950s, with a thesis on the life of Captain America. Soon after graduating, Burnside further researches the secret "Project: Rebirth" and discovers private Nazi files revealing the true identity of the original Captain America as well as the lost Super Soldier serum.

Returning to the United States with this information, Burnside legally changes his name to Steve Rogers, then approaches the FBI offering the Super Soldier serum as leverage to become the next Captain America, in hope of being used as a symbol during the Korean War. While Burnside undergoes surgery to assume the physical appearance and voice of Rogers, the situation in Korea changes. Feeling that introducing a symbol of national pride would be unwise in the political climate of the time, the FBI cancels the project.

The FBI set up Burnside, as "Steve Rogers", a teacher at the private preparatory Lee High School in Connecticut. While there, Burnside encounters an intense advocate in James "Jack" Monroe who shares his obsessive fascination with the original Captain America. When the communist Red Skull attacks the United Nations in an elaborate scheme, Burnside injects himself and Monroe with a sample of the unproven Super-Soldier serum and confronts the Red Skull as the new Cap and Bucky. However, without the vita-ray exposure the original Rogers received to activate and stabilize the serum, Burnside and Monroe undergo a dangerously flawed application. Although initially accepted in the roles of Captain America and Bucky, the formula they ingested eventually gives them psychotic symptoms. The two become unreliable and paranoid, attacking innocents simply for their race or for holding opinions that differ from their own. They are arrested and put into suspended animation by government agents.

Burnside and Monroe are reawakened decades later, and sent out to kill the original Captain and his partner Falcon, but are defeated and returned to their suspended animation. For his part, Rogers has the unsettling thought that he could have suffered his imposter's fate had circumstances been different.

Burnside is placed in the custody of psychologist Doctor Faustus for treatment. Faustus brainwashes him, setting him up as The Grand Director, the leader of a Neo-Nazi group called the National Force. However, when confronted by the original Captain America Burnside is horrified with the revelation of his manipulation of his former identity as Captain America. He curls into a fetal position, and pushes a button on his utility belt engulfing his body in flames.

=== Return ===
After the true Steve Rogers' death, Sharon Carter discovers that Faustus and the Red Skull have been keeping Burnside in suspended animation while he healed from his wounds, programming him to kill the current Captain America, James Barnes. After escaping Faustus, and helping to rescue Sharon Carter from Arnim Zola, Burnside travels the country and considers his place in modern society. He is unimpressed with the current United States' cultural view.

Eventually Burnside joins the terrorist group Watchdogs, and captures Barnes forcing him to wear his World War II Bucky uniform and become his new Bucky. Burnside's plan involves blowing up Hoover Dam to rally other groups like the Watchdogs behind him. Barnes shoots him at the edge of the dam when Burnside threatens to detonate the bomb.

Burnside becomes a crimefighting vigilante. However, his insanity makes him recklessly endanger innocent bystanders. The original Captain America intervenes and Burnside becomes disoriented and runs in front of a semi-truck. Rogers visits Burnside in hospital and tells him that he did a lot of good as Captain America before the serum destroyed his mind, and that Rogers does not hold him responsible. Rogers also explains that Burnside's death has been faked, that he has been given a military funeral with full honors, and that he is formally relieved of his duty and will be taken to a facility to repair his damaged mind, and give him a new identity.

== Powers and abilities ==
Prior to becoming Captain America, William Burnside has university graduate level intellect proficient in research and critical thinking. He has actual superhuman strength. His agility, dexterity, speed, reflexes, coordination, balance, and endurance are superior to those of any Olympic athlete, and his physiological functions operate at the peak of human efficiency. He is a trained boxer and a competent hand-to-hand combatant. As the 1950s Captain America, he wore a chain-mail costume (his 1950s version was distinguishable from the World War II Captain America's costume in that his 1950s costume torso stripes did not fully encircle the costume's waist) and carried a bulletproof steel shield which was destroyed. Following his first revival from suspended animation, he briefly used an "atom-blaster" weapon, presumably salvaged from a government lab. As a member of the National Force, he had access to various forms of advanced technology.

Burnside's current Captain America costume is an exact match to the first Rogers' primary current costume, complete with a new round shield that has survived blows from the "indestructible" round shield now used by Barnes. The exact composition of this new shield has not yet been revealed.

== Other versions ==
=== Heroes Reborn ===
A terrorist calling himself "Grand Director" appeared in the Heroes Reborn universe.

=== What If? ===
In What If? #44 (April 1984), in an alternative world where the Avengers did not find the frozen Steve Rogers, Burnside and Monroe (still as Captain America and Bucky) are revived in the 1970s by an over-zealous, anti-communist janitor at the government facility where they were put into suspended animation. Following their public re-appearance, they are conned by powerful subversive organizations—the Committee, the Secret Empire, and the Sons of the Serpent—into helping them to subjugate the United States to a brutal white supremacist and fascist tyranny. However, in 1983 the real Steve Rogers is recovered by a loyal submarine crew from the Arctic ice, and with the aid of its captain he joins an underground rebellion—consisting of Nick Fury, "Snap" Wilson and Spider-Man—and leads an assault on a national convention, where he defeats Burnside in a vicious duel and leads a chastised population back to its democratic roots.

== Reception ==
Neal Curtis wrote that this version of Captain America was "aggressive and racist". He also praises his story arc and its eventual resolution in canon (related to some retconning) as not just "a brilliant way to explain the gap in Captain America's story" but one about dangerous aspects of American national identity, tackling issues such as discrimination, "zealotry, violence, prejudice, and racist myths of belonging", and situates this in the critique of Nixon's presidential campaign, which he argues relied on these motives.
