= Sin (Marvel Comics) =

Character from Marvel Comics

Sinthea Shmidt Sin
- Cover art for Captain America vol. 5 #17 (April 2006); Art by Steve Epting.

Publication information
- Publisher: Marvel Comics
- First appearance: As Mother Superior: Captain America #290 (February 1984); As Red Skull: Captain America #612 (January 2011)
- Created by: J.M. DeMatteis (writer); Paul Neary (artist)

In-story information
- Alter ego: Sinthea Shmidt
- Species: Human mutate
- Team affiliations: Serpent Squad; Sisters of Sin; The Worthy; Hydra
- Partnerships: Crossbones
- Notable aliases: Mother Superior; Red Skull; Skadi; Sin
- Abilities: Expert hand to hand combatant and martial artist; Highly skilled markswoman; High-level intellect As Mother Superior: Teleportation; Intangibility; Telekinesis; Telepathy

Sin is a supervillain appearing in American comic books published by Marvel Comics. The character, created by J. M. DeMatteis writer and artist Paul Neary, first appeared in Captain America #290 (February 1984), as Sinthea Shmidt, the daughter of the Red Skull and an antagonist of the superhero Steve Rogers / Captain America.

== Publication history ==
Sinthea Shmidt debuted in Captain America #290 (February 1984), created by J.M. DeMatteis and Paul Neary. She appeared in the 2005 Captain America series, the 2011 Fear Itself storyline, the 2018 Captain America series, the 2017 Secret Empire series, and the 2021 United States of Captain America series.

== Fictional character biography ==
Sinthea Shmidt (left and middle) being aged into adulthood as Mother Superior (right). Art by Paul Neary.

Seeking an heir, the Red Skull (Johann Shmidt) fathered a daughter by raping a washerwoman. After the woman died in childbirth, the Red Skull sought to kill his child in disgust over her being female but relented when one of his followers, Sarah Scarbo, asked to raise the infant on his behalf. The Red Skull agreed and left the girl, now named "Sinthea Shmidt", with Scarbo to be raised and indoctrinated with Red Skull's views as she grew up. The Red Skull later returned when Sinthea reached adolescence; through genetic manipulation, Sinthea was artificially aged into her early thirties, keeping her teenage mind while also gaining superhuman abilities.

As Mother Superior, she was placed in command of a group called the Sisters of Sin, young orphan girls who were accelerated into adulthood and given psionic powers by the Red Skull after being indoctrinated by Sinthea. The Sisters of Sin would have many run-ins with Captain America (Steve Rogers) before Rodgers was able to reverse Red Skull's alterations, instantly reverting Sinthea and her followers into harmless children. (she would later claim she was de-aged to the wrong age - but whether this is true or not is unclear).

Later, Mother Night reformed the Sisters of Sin as their new leader, while the de-aged Sinthea herself adopted the name Sister Sin and continued to advance her father's schemes.

Sometime later, she was captured by S.H.I.E.L.D. and taken to their reeducation facility, where they reprogrammed her with false memories as the "normal" American girl Erica Holstein. After the Red Skull was seemingly assassinated by the Winter Soldier under Aleksander Lukin's orders, Crossbones broke into the facility, kidnapped her and tortured her to break the reprogramming. After he succeeded, she simply called herself "Sin" while she entered into a relationship with Crossbones and the two went on a killing spree. She later reunited with the Red Skull who was now inside Lukin's body, having since been restored to her adult form.

As the first part of the Red Skull's master plan, Sin disguised herself as a nurse after the Civil War while Crossbones sniped Captain America at the courthouse, even though it meant obeying her father and abandoning Crossbones to his fate. Sin then revealed to Sharon Carter that Carter was the one who had killed Captain America. Now the leader of a new incarnation of the Serpent Squad, Sin breaks Crossbones out of jail. He is later apprehended again and Sin wounded in an attempt to break into the Capitol Building. Sin is later sent to assassinate the Democratic and Republican presidential candidates, but is stopped by Captain America (Bucky Barnes). In Captain America: Reborn, Sin attempts to assist Norman Osborn to put her father in Steve Rogers's body; however, she is injured by her father's mechanical body's explosion and her face is scarred.

She is later visited in prison by Baron Helmut Zemo for information on Bucky Barnes. Sometime later, Master Man springs her from prison, prompting her to take her place as the new "Red Skull". She delivers a video to the media recorded three months before Barnes's trial, declaring that the reformed hero was not brainwashed, but was an accomplice and fully aware of these actions. She, along with Master Man, is later seen on Ellis Island, where she pretends to blow up the Statue of Liberty with Falcon and Black Widow bound and gagged inside, unless Barnes is delivered to her.

During the Fear Itself storyline, Sin, with Baron Zemo's help, unearths the Hammer of Skadi and becomes Skadi in order to free the Serpent, the god of fear, from his underwater prison. Sin vows to do what her father failed to do in taking over the world. She succeeds in her mission in freeing the Serpent and then prepares an army of Nazis to take over the D.C. Capital. During their battle in Washington, D.C., Skadi mortally wounds the current Captain America. In the final battle, Odin strips the Worthy of their hammers, causing Sin to lose Skadi's powers.

Learning of an alternate future where her father took over the world, Sin allies with Miss Sinister and Mysterio, along with the forces of "Neo-Hydra", with the goal of repeating the feat that led to that victory, in the form of Mysterio manipulating someone- Old Man Logan in the original version of events- into attacking other heroes. However, when Mysterio learns that the other villains plan to kill him once their efforts have succeeded, he turns on the other villains and betrays their location to a group of Avengers which forces Neo-Hydra to flee.

In Rügen, Sin attacks a group of archaeologists and steals from them the helmet of Erida, imbuing her with the power to manipulate hatred and rage. Captain America, Photon, Shang-Chi, and Wasp of the Avengers Emergency Response Squad arrive to confront Sin, who had been using her new powers to send the locals into a mindless rage while empowering herself with their generated hatred. Sin is eventually stopped when Photon strikes her helmet at lightspeed with Captain America's shield, causing her to disintegrate. Sin is later revealed to have survived and works with Hydra to attack the Arnie Roth Community Center.

== Powers and abilities ==
Sin appears to have no superhuman abilities but being trained by her father, the Red Skull, through which she is an expert hand-to-hand combatant and martial artist. She is also highly proficient in firearms and explosives, and has a high-level intellect.

As Mother Superior, Sin possessed a range of superhuman powers including telepathy, telekinesis, teleportation and intangibility. After she was de-aged, she apparently lost these powers completely - unlike the other "Sisters of Sin", whose powers were diminished but not eliminated upon de-aging. The reason for this discrepancy has never been revealed.

While wearing the mask of Erida, Sin gains the ability to manipulate rage and hatred within herself and others. In addition to manipulating others into mindless berserk rages, she can empower herself with their hatred as well as her own, giving her superhuman strength and durability. She can also generate flame like mystical energy blasts that strengthen in proportion to her rage and from those she absorbs from. Her hatred manipulation powers can be resisted by those who have a strong control over their emotions and can be nullified when her concentration is broken. Sin lost these powers when her mask was destroyed.

== Reception ==
Bob Chipman of The Escapist expressed interest in seeing Sinthea Shmidt in the sequel of Captain America: The First Avenger and Captain America: The Winter Soldier.

== In other media ==
=== Film ===
A character loosely based on Sin named Valentina de Santis appears in Captain America (1990), portrayed by Francesca Neri. This version is the Italian daughter and underboss of Tadzio de Santis / Red Skull.

=== Video games ===
- Sinthea Shmidt / Sin appears as a non-playable character in Marvel Avengers Alliance.
- Sinthea Shmidt / Sin appears as a non-playable character in Captain America: The Winter Soldier - The Official Game.
- Sinthea Shmidt / Sin appears as a playable character in Marvel: Future Fight.
- Sinthea Shmidt / Sin appears as a non-playable character in Marvel's Midnight Suns via DLC, voiced by Emily O'Brien. This version is the granddaughter of the Red Skull, and initially works for Hydra before betraying the group to join Dracula.

=== Miscellaneous ===
Sinthea Shmidt / Sin appears as a playable character in the Marvel: Crisis Protocol tabletop game. This version is the leader of the Cabal.
