= Hate-Monger =

Comic book character

Hate-Monger is the name of several characters appearing in American comic books published by Marvel Comics. The first Hate-Monger is a clone of Adolf Hitler created by Arnim Zola.

== Publication history ==
The original character first appeared in Fantastic Four #21 (December, 1963) and was created by Stan Lee and Jack Kirby.

== Fictional character biography ==
=== Adolf Hitler clone ===
Hate-Monger
- Cover to Fantastic Four #21 (December 1963). Art by Jack Kirby.

Publication information
- Publisher: Marvel Comics
- First appearance: Fantastic Four #21 (December, 1963)
- Created by: Stan Lee (writer); Jack Kirby (artist)

In-story information
- Alter ego: Clone of Adolf Hitler
- Species: Human clone
- Team affiliations: Nazi Germany
- Notable aliases: The Fuhrer, Nazi "X", Edmund Heidler, Adam Hauser
- Abilities: Skilled strategist and leader Good hand-to-hand combatant Armored exoskeleton battle-suit grants: Superhuman strength Via H-Ray: Ability to cause feelings of intense hatred, fear and dread and to consume fear After resurrection: Being of pure energy Shapeshifting; Regeneration; Ability to fire laser-like beams from his eyes

Hate-Monger first appeared in the small fictional nation of San Gusto in South America, and came to the attention of authorities when he took over with the use of storm troopers, hoping to upset the balance of power in South America. The Fantastic Four saw a hate rally in New York City and the Thing tried to wreck it, but the Fantastic Four were caught off guard by Hate-Monger's weapon - the Hate-Ray - which instilled hate for others, causing them to fight each other. As a result, the team disbanded and went their separate ways. Nick Fury, at the time a CIA agent, then managed to trick Mister Fantastic into traveling to San Gusto with him to fight Hate-Monger, knowing the other members would follow. Hate-Monger saw the plane leaving and used a device that traveled underground by the use of flames that carved out tunnels to quickly get to South America. Fury and Mister Fantastic fought off some of the rebels, and infiltrated Hate-Monger's headquarters after Mister Fantastic found a device sending out beams and found the source of the disturbance. However, Mister Fantastic was paralyzed with nerve gas and captured by Hate-Monger, who revealed he had been bouncing his ray off the Moon, which had been causing abnormal effects on the tides. Fury managed to cure Mister Fantastic after getting the cure for the ray and gas from Hate-Monger at gunpoint, though Hate-Monger stopped them from capturing him by lowering bulletproof glass. Mister Fantastic then gave the antidote to the other members, and together they got to the base to help Nick Fury. In the final confrontation, Hate-Monger is shot and killed by some of his own stormtroopers after accidentally hitting them with his H-Ray. Mister Fantastic removes Hate-Monger's mask and discovers that he is Adolf Hitler. It is later revealed that Hate-Monger was Hitler's mind transferred to a clone body by Arnim Zola.

Hate-Monger allies with the Red Skull, but they begin plotting against each other after obtaining the Cosmic Cube, which can only be wielded by one person. Hate-Monger decides to use his mind-transference powers to gain control of the Cube itself, only to realize that the Cube was an incomplete empty shell. Trapped within the Cube, Hate-Monger goes mad and eventually fades into nothingness.

Years later, the Red Skull revives Hate-Monger as a being of pure energy, able to project the H-Ray at will. Using his new abilities, Hate-Monger causes strikes and revolts in New York City under the guise of union representative Adam Hauser. Hate-Monger then steals a mind-amplification device from S.H.I.E.L.D., which allows him to incite violence and destruction all over the United States. Hate-Monger captures Captain America, Nick Fury, and Namor, and subjects Fury and Namor to the H-Ray. However, Captain America refuses to surrender. This failure infuriates Hate-Monger to such a degree that the mind-amplifier explodes, apparently destroying him.

=== National Force Hate-Monger ===
A new Hate-Monger appeared wearing a version of Captain America's uniform, and is seen murdering illegal immigrants, saying "America belongs to Americans". This Hate-Monger and his organization, a new iteration of the National Force, are taken down by the Punisher, who wore his own version of the Captain America uniform for the occasion.

=== Edmund Heidler ===
During the Heroic Age storyline, Steve Rogers discovered a clone of Hitler with no memory of his programming. This clone goes by the name of Edmund Heidler and is a painter. Rogers talks to him trying to find any evidence of his original protocol, but he does not receive anything other than a few racist comments. Leaving his art sale, Rogers returns to Sharon Carter who wants to flat-out kill him. She is stopped by Rogers, who tells her that he has not done anything wrong. After Rogers leaves, Heidler begins to subconsciously paint swastikas in his apartment.

=== Josh Glenn ===
A new Hate-Monger named Josh Glenn eventually emerges during the Fear Itself storyline. Originally an office worker who became frustrated by what he perceived as persecution at the hands of immigrants, Glenn took it upon himself to continue Hate-Monger's legacy after learning about the villain through conspiracy theory websites. Glenn's paranoid anti-immigrant attitude culminates in an attempt to steal firearms from a local pawn shop, which results in his capture by Black Panther. Following Glenn's release, the essence of the original Hate-Monger returns and enters his body, granting him the abilities of his predecessor. The new Hate-Monger then set out to enact his revenge on Black Panther, recruiting a new nationalist vigilante known as the American Panther as part of his scheme, but T'Challa was eventually able to drive Hate-Monger's spirit out of him.

Hate-Monger uses Hydra's time travel technology to try to alter history by assassinating Barack Obama in 1965, but is prevented from doing so by Nick Fury and Nick Fury Jr. Glenn as Hate-Monger would join the Hellfire Club on an assault on Krakoa.

=== Other characters named Hate-Monger ===
- Psycho-Man created an android called Hate-Monger, which was destroyed by the Scourge of the Underworld.
- An energy vampire who fed off hate adopted the name of Hate-Monger for a time, then changed his name to Animus.

== Powers and abilities ==
Hate-Monger was an ordinary man with no superhuman powers, created as the result of cloning and genetic engineering. Hate-Monger's brain has been "energized" by Arnim Zola's techniques, enabling him to project his consciousness into the brain of a body cloned from his own if his current body is dying. He used several such bodies, including one which possessed superhuman strength, but was mute.

Hate-Monger wears chain-mail body armor under his hood, tunic, and boots. He has sometimes worn an armored battle-suit containing an exoskeleton that amplifies his strength to superhuman levels. Scientists and technicians in Hate-Monger's employ, including Arnim Zola, have manufactured and supplied him with a number of other paraphernalia and contrivances. He is often armed with his handgun projecting the "Hate-ray" or "H-ray", high frequency microwave radiation that affects the centers of the human brain controlling emotions so as to stimulate and magnify the victims' feelings of dread, fear, and anger to unreasonable levels, including repressed or subconscious sentiments of this kind. The hate-ray can also transform feelings of love into equally strong or perhaps even stronger hatreds. He also had access to large-scale "Hate-ray" projectors, missiles armed with nuclear warheads, disease-carrying bacilli, and various advanced aircraft and spacecraft.

After his resurrection by the Cosmic Cube, Hate-Monger was now a being of pure energy that could take on any form he wished, and his H-Ray powers were now his own. He was able to regenerate from most wounds and could fire laser-like beams from his eyes.

Hate-Monger was also a cunning strategist and a charismatic leader, and able to incite fanatical loyalty to him through his rhetoric and persuasive personality. He is a good hand-to-hand combatant, and has apparently received some training in physical combat. He also had some talent in painting.

== In other media ==
Hate-Monger appears in Marvel Avengers Alliance.

== Reception ==
The Hate-Monger is discussed by C. Richard King and David J. Leonard in Beyond Hate: White Power and Popular Culture.

== See also ==
- Adolf Hitler in popular culture
