= National Force =

Fictional comic book organization

Publication information
- Publisher: Marvel Comics
- First appearance: Captain America #231 (Mar 1979)
- Created by: Roger McKenzie; Sal Buscema

In-story information
- Type of organization: Subversive
- Leader(s): Doctor Faustus; Hate-Monger
- Agent(s): 88; Sharon Carter; Grand Director

The National Force is a fictional organization appearing in American comic books published by Marvel Comics.

== Fictional history ==
The National Force was a neo-fascist organization created by Doctor Faustus.

Faustus was able to obtain possession of the fourth Captain America (William Burnside, although he legally changed his name to Steven Rogers) as well as his partner Bucky, heroes whose bodies were being kept in a state of suspended animation since the 1950s. Faustus took control of the mind of Burnside to try to use him in a plot against Steve Rogers, the original Captain America. Faustus brainwashed him into returning as "The Grand Director", the leader of the organization known as the National Force.

Sharon Carter was working as a liaison for S.H.I.E.L.D. to the NYPD, when she was investigating the National Force and then infiltrated the organization. When the National Force was fighting with criminals on the streets of Harlem, the National Guard arrived to end the battle. Sharon triggered a self-destruct device embedded in the National Force uniform she was wearing while she was subjected to a mind-altering gas. Rogers was shown a recording of her apparent suicide on videotape.

The Grand Director apparently committed suicide after the original Captain America and Daredevil defeated him in battle. He has since reappeared, having survived the suicide attempt. He was later shot by Captain America (Bucky Barnes) and fell off the Hoover Dam. No body was ever recovered.

A storyline from The Punisher War Journal from 2007 depicts the National Force as a terrorist syndicate with neo-Nazi ideology operating on the US-Mexico border led by the Hate-Monger. The Punisher infiltrated and destroyed this version of the National Force.

== Analysis ==
The National Force was presented as a racist organization in the comics that was a "caricature of anti-integrationist political groups" in the USA. It features elements of the Ku Klux Klan, National Socialist and white supremacy movements. The organization is portrayed as having high-ranking supporters, which "sets up the understanding that while everyday Americans may not be racist, the activities of the National Force advance the agenda of at least some elites". The presentation of the organization also connects elements of red-baiting and conservative opposition to integration from the 1950s to racism in 1979, when the National Force appeared in the comics.

According to King and Leonard, looking at the appearance in The Punisher War Journal, the racism of the National Force, undergirded by criminal acts, is depicted as clearly evil. They criticize that this presentation deflects the attention of the reader from "the less visible ways in which white racism operates today".

== Appendix ==
=== Further reading ===
- Budrow, Erin, ""Hail Hydra": Marvel's Captain America and White Nationalism in the United States" (2019). Summer Research. 344.
