= Doctor Faustus (character) =

Marvel Comics fictional character

- Doctor Faustus; Art by Mike Perkins

Publication information
- Publisher: Marvel Comics
- First appearance: Captain America #107 (Nov. 1968)
- Created by: Stan Lee; Jack Kirby

In-story information
- Alter ego: Johann Fennhoff
- Species: Human
- Team affiliations: Secret Empire; Corporation; National Force; S.H.I.E.L.D. Hydra
- Partnerships: Red Skull
- Notable aliases: Doctor Faustus, Master of Men's Minds, Edward Marlowe
- Abilities: Expert in psychological warfare Genius-level intellect Use of hologram projectors, hallucinogenic gas dispensers, androids and elaborate props Ability to modulate his voice in a highly persuasive manner

Doctor Faustus (Johann Fennhoff) is a supervillain appearing in American comic books published by Marvel Comics. The character is depicted usually as an adversary of Captain America. An Austrian psychiatrist and criminal mastermind who employs psychological manipulation on his enemies, the character was created by writer Stan Lee and artist Jack Kirby, and first appeared in Captain America #107 (November 1968).

Johann Fennhoff appeared in the first season of the Marvel Cinematic Universe TV series Agent Carter, portrayed by Ralph Brown.

== Publication history ==
Faustus is named after the character in Christopher Marlowe's Renaissance play The Tragical History of Doctor Faustus, about a man who sold his soul to Lucifer to gain infinite knowledge in exchange for 24 years of service to the devil Mephistophiles. This character predates the Christopher Marlowe play, in the legend built around the real-life Johann Georg Faust.

== Fictional character biography ==
Johann Fennhoff was born in Vienna, Austria. He became a psychiatrist and criminal mastermind. He has proclaimed himself the "Master of Men's Minds", and is known for the use of psychological methods of combat. His plots typically involve manipulating his foes into positions where they will, essentially, kill themselves.

In his first appearance, Faustus induced nightmares and hallucinations in Captain America (Steve Rogers) in an attempt to drive him insane. However, he was easily bested in a physical confrontation.

It was later revealed that Faustus had been treating the amnesiac Peggy Carter, and captured Sharon Carter and her parents in an attempt to destroy Captain America. Faustus, with the help of Karla Sofen, acquired stolen weapons from Stark International with which he planned to threaten New York City, and organized a private flight of American criminals; however this plan was thwarted by Captain America.

Faustus is the mastermind behind the neo-Nazi group National Force, directing them behind the scenes. He is responsible for the creation of the Grand Director to lead the National Force, as well as brainwashing Sharon Carter and attempting to make her commit suicide.

Faustus mentally conditions Everyman to be his operative, later known as Zeitgeist. He used his absorbascan to draw in psychic power from other people in an attempt to mentally defeat Mister Fantastic and prove his worth to the Secret Empire. Everyman battles Spider-Man and Mister Fantastic, but they defeat him. When Mister Fantastic seeks Everyman's backer, Faustus attempts to attack Mister Fantastic psychologically by using elaborate androids to create the illusion that Mister Fantastic has killed the rest of the Fantastic Four. Mister Fantastic sees through the ruse and causes Faustus to have a breakdown.

Faustus is responsible for manipulating Sharon Carter into assassinating Captain America following the 2006 storyline "Civil War". It is further revealed that the Captain America from the 1950s is alive and in Faustus's possession, recuperating slowly, and reconditioned to be an agent sent to attack the new Captain America (Bucky Barnes). The failure of this attack, and verbal abuse from the Red Skull and Arnim Zola, causes Faustus to withdraw from the project. Before this, he frees Sharon and gives crucial information about Red Skull's plans to S.H.I.E.L.D.

Rogers, Falcon and Black Widow are instrumental in exonerating Barnes when the latter is tried for the crimes committed as the Winter Soldier, in light of the mind control to which Barnes was subjected. This is done in part with Faustus's testimony in the trial, and a demonstration of his mind-control abilities, which he displays by manipulating the prosecuting lawyer into attacking the judge.

Faustus establishes a real estate development business based in Jersey City, New Jersey called Hope Yards Development Relocation Association, as a front for a Hydra cell. The cell's purpose is to implement Faustus's plan to market energy drinks and aerosol sprays laced with mind controlling nanomachines. The plot is foiled by Ms. Marvel, as is Faustus's subsequent attempt at getting one of his minions elected mayor of Jersey City.

During the Secret Empire storyline, Doctor Faustus is part of the Hydra High Council that the new Madame Hydra is collecting to assist Steve Rogers, who had become a Hydra sleeper agent after Red Skull and Kobik rewrote reality. After Hydra's global takeover, Faustus is assigned to convince Sharon Carter of loving Rogers regardless of this new allegiance. Sharon pretends to have been won over by Faustus, then attacks him. It is revealed that, after she was brainwashed and forced to shoot Captain America, Sharon trained herself to prevent Faustus from controlling her again.

== Powers and abilities ==
Doctor Faustus has no superhuman powers but has a genius intellect, and is extremely charismatic and can modulate his voice in a highly persuasive manner. He has a doctorate in psychiatry.

Faustus regularly employs hologram projectors, hallucinogenic gas dispensers, androids, and elaborate props. He also hires henchmen to impersonate various people as a part of his scheme to affect his victims' minds.

== Other versions ==
=== Earth-X ===
An alternate universe version of Doctor Faustus from Earth-9997 makes a cameo appearance in Paradise X #1 as a resident of the titular afterlife.

=== House of M ===
An alternate universe version of Doctor Faustus from Earth-58163 appears in New Thunderbolts #11. This version is an Army scientist.

=== Ultimate Marvel ===
An alternate universe version of Doctor Faustus from Earth-1610 appears in Ultimate Comics: Armor Wars #2. This version is an information broker based in Prague who was fused with MODOK after an accident with Reed Richards' dimensional portal.

== In other media ==
=== Television ===
- Doctor Faustus appears in the Spider-Man and His Amazing Friends episode "Pawns of the Kingpin", voiced by Dennis Marks. This version works for the Kingpin.
- Johann Fennhoff appears in the first season of the Marvel Cinematic Universe (MCU) series Agent Carter, portrayed by Ralph Brown. This version is a Russian operative of Leviathan from the late 1940s. Introduced under the alias of Viktor Ivchenko, he participates in Leviathan's plot to frame Howard Stark for selling his technology on the black market before eventually being defeated by Peggy Carter and arrested by the Strategic Scientific Reserve (SSR). Subsequently, his cellmate Arnim Zola recruits him into Hydra.
  - While Fenhoff does not appear in the MCU series Agents of S.H.I.E.L.D., present-day Hydra members Daniel Whitehall and Sunil Bakshi utilize a method of hypnosis named after him to hypnotize others to their cause.
- Doctor Faustus appears in the Avengers Assemble episode "New Year's Resolution", voiced by Mick Wingert.

=== Video games ===
Doctor Faustus appears in Marvel's Midnight Suns, voiced by Time Winters. This version is a member of Hydra who seeks to use a combination of magic and science to resurrect Lilith and bring her under Hydra's control. While he succeeds in the former, Crossbones kills him to keep the Midnight Suns and the Avengers from learning her plans.
