= Jack Monroe (character) =

Fictional superhero appearing in American comic books published by Marvel Comics

Publication information
- Publisher: Marvel Comics
- First appearance: As Bucky: Captain America #153 (September 1972); appearances in Captain America stories from Young Men #24 (Dec. 1953) through to 1955 retroactively ascribed to the character As Nomad: Captain America #282 (June 1982)
- Created by: Bucky: Don Rico (writer); John Romita Sr. (artist); Nomad: J. M. DeMatteis (writer); Mike Zeck (artist)

In-story information
- Alter ego: Jack Monroe
- Species: Human
- Team affiliations: Secret Defenders
- Partnerships: Captain America; Captain America/William Burnside
- Notable aliases: Bucky, Nomad, Scourge

Jack Monroe is a fictional superhero appearing in American comic books published by Marvel Comics. The character was originally introduced as the third sidekick under the Bucky identity, initially treated as the original Bucky Barnes before being retconned as a separate character, and later the most well-known incarnation of Nomad.

== Publication history ==
The character Jack Monroe has a complicated history, and his origin involves a complex series of retcons. Although the character's first real appearance is as "Bucky" in Captain America #153, the origin of the character, first revealed in Captain America #155 (again by Englehart and Buscema), identifies him as the "Bucky" that appeared in Captain America comics which were originally published in the 1950s.

When they were first published between 1953 and 1954 those Captain America stories, which were written by Don Rico and illustrated by Mort Lawrence and John Romita, Sr., starred Steve Rogers (the original Captain America) and Bucky and were clearly set in the 1950s, with the duo prominently battling communism and a communist Red Skull. However, when the character returned in Avengers #4 (March 1964), it is revealed that the original Captain America has been in a state of suspended animation since a battle he fought near the close of World War II, a battle in which the original Bucky perished.

The 1950s stories were thus considered outside of official canon until Englehart's 1972 Captain America storyline, which attempted to resolve the discrepancy by showing how a teenager (Monroe is simply referred to as "Bucky" throughout, the name "Jack Monroe" was introduced in later stories) and an unnamed man (later known as "The Grand Director") had assumed both the public and private identities of the original Captain America and Bucky as part of a government-sponsored program which planned to replace the lost heroes to combat the "red threat". Captain America #155 reveals that the two gained superpowers by injecting themselves with a "Super-Soldier Formula" that they find in old Nazi files. The formula initially grants them abilities similar to those of the original Captain America (Steve Rogers). However, the formula made no mention of the essential Vita-ray exposure portion of the treatment and the absence causes its effects to eventually give them psychotic symptoms, leading to their fight against communism degenerating into random attacks on anyone they deem insufficiently patriotic, including civil rights protesters. As a result, the two are arrested and put into suspended animation by government agents.

This complicated origin is the reason that some sources list Young Men #24 (December 1953; the first appearance of the communist-hunting Captain America and Bucky) as Monroe's first appearance, though the issue was originally intended to depict the original Bucky. A later story, What If #4, (August 1977), further complicates the Bucky history by introducing another "Bucky" (Fred Davis) that takes on the role in 1945, many years before Monroe assumes the title, which makes Monroe the third "Bucky" chronologically.

Monroe was mostly portrayed as essentially having the same powers as the first Captain America, Steve Rogers. This has long been a matter of contention in the comics as Monroe received his powers from the same sample of the Super-Soldier Serum that gave the 1950s Captain America superhuman strength. He became super strong but after being exposed to stabilizing rays (similar to the Vita-rays Steve Rogers received), his strength normalized to peak human.

In Captain America #153–156, "Bucky" and his partner are briefly reawakened decades after being put in suspended animation, but are subdued by Falcon and the original Captain America. In Captain America #232–236 (April–August 1979) — by writers Roger McKenzie, Jim Shooter and Michael Fleisher and artist Sal Buscema — "Captain America" is revived and brainwashed into becoming the fascistic "Grand Director", who shoots and apparently kills his former partner Bucky and later apparently commits suicide. Writer J. M. DeMatteis resurrected the "Bucky" character in Captain America #281 (May 1983), which is the first comic that names him as "Jack Monroe". That story reveals that the gun was loaded with blanks, and the cured Monroe is given the Nomad identity by Steve Rogers in Captain America #282 (June 1983). Nomad then becomes Captain America's partner for the next two years of published comics. DeMatteis' successor as writer of the series, Mark Gruenwald, had Nomad end the partnership in Captain America #309 (September 1985). Gruenwald said he did this "because Nomad made Cap seem old. Cap had to take the mentor relationship with Nomad, and he was coming off as everyone's favorite father figure rather than as the active vital superhero."

However, Gruenwald continued to feature the character in Captain America intermittently. He features in Captain America #324–325 (December 1986–January 1987), and after Steve Rogers is stripped of his Captain America identity, Nomad appears in a storyline which continues for over a year of Captain America stories (#336–350; December 1987–February 1989) where Nomad is one of Rogers's partners as he continues being a superhero under the identity of "The Captain". During this storyline Nomad is depicted as a tetchy and insolent character who takes an instant disliking to Demolition Man, a dislike which only increases when it becomes evident that Vagabond is attracted to him. Though not explicitly stated in the stories themselves, the Captain America letters pages explained that the formula which gave Nomad his powers was again causing him to become aggressive and mentally unstable.

The character next starred in the eight page story "Angel in the Snow" in Marvel Comics Presents #14 (March 1989), which was written by Fabian Nicieza, a writer who would go on to script most of the character's appearances in the following decade and a half. The story is followed up in a backup story in Captain America Annual #9 (1990), in which Monroe discards his spandex outfit and becomes an urban vigilante.

In 1990, Nomad starred in an eponymous four-issue miniseries, written by Nicieza and penciled by James Fry III (November 1990–February 1991). Captain America Annual #10 features a prologue to the upcoming Nomad ongoing series. Again written by Nicieza, the series lasted 25 issues (May 1992–May 1994) and featured artwork from several artists, most notably Pat Olliffe and S. Clarke Hawbaker. At one point in the series Monroe spends an extended period in Los Angeles, California and in one issue (#9; January 1993) Nicieza addresses the subject of the 1992 Los Angeles riots which had recently occurred when the story was first published. In an interview around this time, Nicieza commented, "There are times when I start burning out, getting sick of comics. And then, I'll start plotting or scripting an issue of Nomad, and by the time I'm done, I feel great. ... [Nomad is] about Jack Monroe trying to cope with a life that he doesn't have any control over, it's about America, and it's about life. Jack also uses so many detective cliches that it's a blast writing his dialogue — where else can I use, 'The french fries were wetter than a swimsuit calendar'?"

"Dead Man's Hand", a crossover with the Punisher War Journal and Daredevil series also being published at that time, sees Nomad teaming up with the Punisher and Daredevil against a coalition of criminal organizations. The title was also involved in the 1993 Infinity Crusade crossover, and in his own series, Nomad confronts an evil clone of Gambit. At the close of the Nomad ongoing series, the character was believed dead.

In Thunderbolts #49 (April 2001), it was revealed that Monroe was placed in suspended animation and was revived and temporarily brainwashed into being a new version of the Scourge character. Monroe is next shown by writer Ed Brubaker and artist Steve Epting in Captain America vol. 5 #3 (April 2005) being shot dead by a mysterious assailant, later revealed to be the original Bucky, now known as the Winter Soldier. Captain America vol. 5 #7 (July 2005) by Brubaker and artist John Paul Leon then reveals the events of the last few days of Monroe's life.

Subsequently Marvel published a Jack Monroe story in Thunderbolts From the Marvel Vault #1 (June 2011) written by Fabian Nicieza and illustrated by Derec Aucoin, which followed Monroe after his time as Scourge.

== Fictional character biography ==
Jack Monroe was born in Naugatuck, Connecticut. He became an adventurer and the partner of William Burnside who had assumed the identity of Steve Rogers in the 1950s. After operating together for some time as Bucky and Captain America, respectively, the two were placed in suspended animation. The two superheroes are reawakened decades later. In their delusional state, the man and teenager who were the 1950s Captain America and Bucky attempt to kill the original Captain America and Falcon. However, they are eventually captured and returned to a state of suspended animation.

Burnside is revived and brainwashed by the psychologist Doctor Faustus into becoming the Grand Director, leader of the National Force. Under Faustus' control, Burnside shoots and apparently kills Bucky. Faustus and Burnside are defeated by the original Captain America and Daredevil, after which Burnside commits suicide. It is later revealed that Faustus had loaded the gun with blanks as he intended to use Monroe in a later plot, which was never realized. Monroe was subsequently taken into S.H.I.E.L.D. custody and seemingly cured of his psychotic symptoms. Monroe then sought out Steve Rogers, and dons a Bucky costume to help him defeat Viper. Monroe is then given Rogers' former Nomad identity and battles Viper alongside Captain America.

Nomad is given a new costume and battles Slug, dismantling his criminal empire with Captain America's assistance. Monroe returns again after Steve Rogers is stripped of the Captain America identity by the Commission on Superhuman Activities. Rogers continues being a superhero under the identity of "The Captain" and, wearing a black version of his regular costume, he begins traveling the nation, fighting evil with a group of his former partners, including Nomad, Demolition Man, and Falcon. The group also includes Nomad's then-girlfriend, a neophyte adventurer known as Vagabond. During this storyline, Nomad is depicted as a tetchy and insolent character who takes an instant disliking to Demolition Man, the negativity increased by an apparent attraction between Vagabond and Demolition Man.

When a faction of the Serpent Society under the leadership of Viper attempts to poison the Washington, DC water supply, The Captain and his team intervene. During these events, Nomad, Vagabond, and Demolition Man are captured by the Commission and imprisoned. The former Serpent Society leader known as Sidewinder uses his teleportation ability to enter the jail and free Diamondback, a Society member who remained loyal to him. Sidewinder offers to free the other heroes imprisoned there, but Vagabond and Demolition Man decline, saying that they think it was wrong to flee the authorities. Nomad scoffs at this notion and decides to leave jail with Sidewinder and Diamondback. This incident ends his relationship with Vagabond. The Captain approaches Nomad for help, but finds Nomad in a bar, drunk. Upon finding out Rogers plans to give himself up to the Commission, Nomad refuses to help him and the two men part on bad terms.

Going solo again, Monroe becomes an urban vigilante. He kidnaps an infant girl from her drug addicted mother, naming the infant "Bucky". The Commission on Superhuman Activities begins to put Monroe under scrutiny. The Commission, allied with the military, sends Steve Rogers (now restored to the Captain America role) to try and subdue Nomad. In a subsequent firefight Nomad defeats Safilios and kills several drug dealers and government officials. Nomad begins to spend some time on the road, dealing with problems not usually the purview of superheroes, such as AIDS, homelessness, and hate crimes.

Nomad is eventually believed dead after a confrontation with his hometown's Nazi militia. (Monroe's father had been a Nazi sympathizer during World War II.) However, it was revealed that he was in fact placed in suspended animation. A bystander's body was used to replace his. Some time later, Henry Peter Gyrich revives Monroe and infuses his body with nanites that place Monroe under command, making Monroe a new version of the Scourge of the Underworld. Though Monroe was conscious and aware of his actions, he can neither resist Gyrich's orders nor reveal his true identity or details of his servitude to anyone. As Scourge, he battles the Thunderbolts, who eventually free him from Gyrich's control.

After returning to his original Nomad costume and identity, Monroe relapses into psychotic episodes and symptoms. At this time, Monroe had checked in on his former ward he called Bucky who had since been adopted. Jack is shot dead by an unknown assailant, who is later revealed to be the Winter Soldier, as he leaves a bar.

== Powers and abilities ==
While Jack Monroe's strength, endurance, reflexes, and agility were not beyond the limits of the human body, they were superior to that of any Olympic athlete who ever competed. As a result of not going through the Vita-Ray process, his transformation eventually drove him insane and gave him a form of cancer.

As Nomad, he wore a pair of stun-discs on each shoulder near the collarbone. These 6-inch (150 mm) tool-steel alloy discs could be thrown as projectile weapons.

Monroe has extensive experience in hand-to-hand combat, having received personal tutoring by Captain America. He is also an expert marksman.

As Scourge, he had access to an array of equipment based on devices confiscated from costumed criminals, created for the Scourge identity by the Commission on Superhuman Activities on Henry Peter Gyrich's orders. Such items seen in use by Monroe include versions of the Goblin glider, the Unicorn's energy-projecting headgear, and Stilt-Man's telescoping legs, as well as other unspecified weaponry. Certain items were installed in the Scourge costume, while others were miniaturized with Pym particles and stored in one of the costume's gauntlets; all of this equipment was accessible through voice-coded commands. Monroe was also able to use his gauntlet's store of Pym particles to alter his own size or that of other people and objects; however, his supply of the particles was not infinite, and exhausting that supply could force him to abandon much of his stored weaponry.

== Reception ==
Comic Book Resources placed him as one of the superheroes Marvel "wants you to forget".
