= Red Skull =

Supervillain appearing in Marvel Comics

- Timeless: Villains Variants cover of Captain America: Symbol of Truth #11 (March 2023). Art by Alex Ross.

Publication information
- Publisher: Marvel Comics (Note: Formerly Timely Comics and Atlas Comics)
- First appearance: Captain America Comics #1 (March 1941)
- Created by: France Herron; Jack Kirby; Joe Simon

In-story information
- Alter ego: Johann Shmidt; George Maxon; Albert Malik; Sinthea Shmidt
- Species: Human mutate (Note: In Marvel Comics, the term "mutate" is used as a noun to designate characters that received superpowers from an external source, as opposed to Marvel's mutants.)
- Place of origin: Germany
- Team affiliations: Nazi Germany (SS-Oberführer); Kronas Corporation; Exiles; U.L.T.I.M.A.T.U.M.; Skeleton Crew; Hydra
- Partnerships: Arnim Zola; Crossbones
- Notable aliases: Der Rote Schädel (German name, translation: "The Red Skull"); Senator Dell Rusk; Bettman P. Lyles; The Agent of a Thousand Faces (impersonated in Europe during World War II); The Man (head of the People's Militia); Cyrus Fenton; John Smith (the English version of his natural German name); Teacher; Tod March (president and founder of Galactic Pictures); Aleksander Lukin; The White Skull
- Abilities: Genius-level intellect; Master tactician and strategist; Skilled hand-to-hand combatant, marksman and swordsman

The Red Skull (Johann Schmidt) is a supervillain appearing in American comic books published by Marvel Comics. Created by France Herron, Jack Kirby, and Joe Simon, the character is best known as the archenemy of the superhero Captain America. Depicted as a Nazi agent and protégé of Adolf Hitler during World War II, he becomes a threat to his mentor and the world at large. Although he initially only wears a mask to give his face the appearance of a red skull, Shmidt suffers a horrific disfigurement decades later that causes his face to match his namesake. The character first appeared in Captain America Comics #1 (1941), in which his secret identity is revealed to be George Maxon, who is retroactively established as a decoy working for Shmidt, who would debut in Captain America Comics #7 (1941). Other individuals have also adopted the Red Skull persona, including Albert Malik and Sinthea Shmidt.

The Red Skull has been adapted in various media incarnations. Scott Paulin portrayed the character in the 1990 direct-to-video film Captain America. In the Marvel Cinematic Universe, Hugo Weaving portrayed the Red Skull in Captain America: The First Avenger (2011), and was then replaced by Ross Marquand in Avengers: Infinity War (2018) and Avengers: Endgame (2019). Peter Cullen, Steve Blum, Liam O'Brien and others have provided the character's voice in media ranging from animation to video games.

== Publication history ==
The original Red Skull was introduced in Timely Comics' Captain America Comics #1 (cover-dated March 1941) which was written and drawn by the team of Joe Simon and Jack Kirby. On separate occasions, both Kirby and Simon claimed to have had the original idea for the character, and at the 1970 San Diego Comic Con, Kirby said the Red Skull was created by France Herron. Simon later credited both Kirby and Herron with having a role in creating Red Skull.

=== Golden age ===
The Skull made limited appearances in the Golden Age of Captain America. His first story in Captain America Comics #1 follows the Red Skull as he takes out military personnel in attempts to sabotage United States military industry. In the issue, his identity is revealed as George Maxon of Maxon Aircraft, and dies at the end of the issue by rolling onto his own hypodermic needle in apparent suicide.

The Skull returns again in issue #3 of Captain America Comics having survived his own needle. He commandeers bank robberies in an effort to raise money to overthrow the US government, declaring, "Of course you realize the main item in overthrowing the government is money!" The Skull again assumedly dies at the end of the issue when Captain America returns a thrown bomb.

The Red Skull once again thwarts death by returning and planning crimes around music in Captain America Comics #7 (October 1941). Stories published decades later claimed this was the Nazi Johann Shmidt, and that the Red Skull appearing before that point was his pawn George Maxon. Marvel has since revealed Johann Shmidt's first appearance was also in Captain America Comics #1, and the two skulls worked together in the Golden Age.

The Red Skull made sporadic appearances in other Timely comic books in the forties. He appeared in Young Allies #1 and #4. appearing maskless in both issues, including when getting up from bed in issue #1 and while in a fighter jet with one other ally in #4. He was also to appear in All-Select Comics #2 (December 1943), Captain America Comics #37 (February 1944) and All Winners Comics #12 (April 1944) in various plots to overthrow the United States.

In the last issue of Captain America Comics in the forties, which had since been retitled Captain America's Weird Tales, Red Skull appears in a dream of Captain America, and they both battle in Hell for the damnation of each other's soul. This story was notable for including horror aspects in Captain America stories, as horror comics books became popular during this time period. Timely would end the run of Captain America after this issue to focus on mystery, humor, and horror.

After an absence from comics for five years, both Captain America and the Red Skull were brought back in 1954 in Young Men Comics #24, in a story entitled "Back From The Dead". Here the Red Skull, thinking Captain America was dead, has left politics and started a large criminal enterprise in the United States. In his next appearance, in issue #27, the Red Skull is once again left for dead from a truck crash.

=== Silver age ===
After an absence for more than a decade, the character of Red Skull returned in new stories starting with Tales of Suspense #65 (May 1965) in a Captain America World War II-period story run. Marvel resorted to retroactive continuity in recreating the identity of the Red Skull for the Silver age, explaining the real George "John" Maxon was killed and replaced with a lookalike who worked for the real Red Skull. In traveling to Germany to seek out the real Red Skull, Captain America finally meets Johann Shmidt face to face.

Red Skull was established as a contemporary villain in Tales of Suspense #79 (July 1966), with the explanation that he had been in suspended animation since World War II. He would continue to appear in this title after Tales of Suspense was renamed Captain America in 1968 with Marvel establishing the character as the archenemy of Captain America for a new age of readers.

=== Bronze age ===
During Jack Kirby's return to Marvel in 1976, the Red Skull would again appear in a run of Captain America during which Kirby both wrote and penciled stories of the characters he helped create. During this run, it is notable Red Skull was the only villain Kirby brought back, having distanced these new Captain America stories from the rest of the Marvel Universe. During this period, the Red Skull would also be used as an antagonist in the Invaders comic book series which focused on period stories from the forties.

For decades, the character's true face was hidden, but in Captain America #297 (September 1984) the Red Skull unmasks in front of Captain America and his face, albeit extremely aged, is fully revealed. In the next issue, the Red Skull retells his story with his face fully visible in his various ages. The Red Skull seemingly dies in issue #300 (December 1984) after a battle with Captain America and would disappear for five years. When the character is revealed to be alive in issue #350 (February 1989), in a story called "Resurrection", by Mark Gruenwald, the face of Johann Shmidt's original body is hidden again, but the Red Skull's face is fully visible, albeit in his cloned copy of Captain America's body.

The character's origin was more fully illustrated in the miniseries Red Skull: Incarnate, with Shmidt's face fully visible again.

== Fictional character biography ==
=== Johann Shmidt ===
Johann Shmidt was a Nazi general officer and confidant of Adolf Hitler. He is an enemy of Captain America, the Avengers, and the interests of the United States and the free world in general. He was physically augmented by having his mind placed into the body of a clone of Captain America, the pinnacle of human perfection. He has been seemingly killed in the past, only to return time and time again to plague the world with schemes of world domination and genocide.

Johann Shmidt was born in a village in Germany to Hermann Shmidt and Martha Shmidt. His mother died in childbirth, and his father blamed Johann for her death. Johann's father tried to drown the baby, only to be stopped by the attending doctor; he later committed suicide, leaving Johann an orphan. The doctor took Johann to an orphanage, where the child led a lonely existence. Johann ran away from the orphanage when he was 7 years old and lived on the streets as a beggar and thief. As he grew older, he worked at various menial jobs but spent most of his time in prison for crimes ranging from vagrancy to theft. The Skull's real name of Johann Shmidt was not revealed in his Golden Age and Silver Age appearances. As a young man, Shmidt was from time to time employed by a Jewish shopkeeper, whose daughter Esther was the only person who had treated Shmidt kindly up to that point. Seized with passion for Esther, Schmidt tried to force himself upon her, only for her to reject him. In unthinking fury, Shmidt murdered her. Shmidt fled the scene in terror but also felt ecstatic joy in committing his first murder. In killing Esther, he had given vent to the rage at the world that had been building up in him throughout his young life.

According to the official version of the story told by the Red Skull and the Nazis, Shmidt met Hitler while working as a bellhop in a hotel. This occurred during his late teens, around the same time that the Nazi Party gained power in Germany. Shmidt wound up serving Hitler's rooms at the hotel. By chance, Shmidt was present by bringing refreshments when the Führer was furiously scolding an officer for letting a spy escape, during which Hitler declared that he could create a better National Socialist out of the bellhop. Looking closely at the youth and sensing his dark inner nature, Hitler decided to act on his words and recruited Shmidt. In the miniseries Red Skull: Incarnate, it has been revealed that Shmidt actually engineered his meeting with the Führer with himself disguised as a bellhop, tricking his fellow orphan Dieter into trying to kill Hitler and then taking this opportunity to save Hitler's life.

Dissatisfied with the standard drill instruction his subordinates used to train Shmidt, Hitler took over personally, training Shmidt as his right-hand man after Heinrich Himmler. Upon completion, Hitler gave Shmidt a unique uniform with a grotesque red skull mask, and he emerged as the Red Skull (in literal German: Roter Totenkopf or Roter (Toten-)Schädel) for the first time. His role was the embodiment of Nazi intimidation, while Hitler could remain the popular leader of Germany. To that end, the Red Skull was appointed head of Nazi terrorist activities with an additional large role in external espionage and sabotage. He succeeded, wreaking havoc throughout Europe in the early stages of World War II. The propaganda effect was so great that the United States government decided to counter it by creating their own equivalent using the one recipient of the lost Project Rebirth: Steve Rogers, as the superhero/counterintelligence agent, Captain America.

In Europe during the war, the Red Skull took personal command of many military actions and personally supervised the takeovers and lootings of many cities and towns. The Red Skull also organized a Wolf Pack of U-boats which preyed upon shipping across the world, often under the Red Skull's personal command. At first, Hitler took great pride in the successes of his protégé and let the Red Skull have anything he wanted. Hitler thus financed the construction of secret bases for the Red Skull in various locations throughout the world, many of which were equipped with highly advanced experimental weapons and devices developed by Nazi scientists. The Red Skull was particularly interested in procuring technological weapons that could be used for the purposes of subversion and warfare. During the war he stole plans for the nullatron, a device that could control human minds, adapted a space-warping device developed by the cyborg scientist code-named Brain Drain, and commissioned Nazi scientists to develop a projector which could encircle and suspend sections of cities within spheres of energy. But while the Red Skull always admired Hitler for his ideological vision, he was never fully content with being Hitler's subordinate. The Red Skull kidnapped and killed many of Hitler's closest advisers and eventually rose to become the second-most-powerful man in Nazi Germany. Now Hitler could no longer effectively control the Red Skull and came to fear him, especially since the Red Skull had made no secret of his ambition to supplant Hitler someday. Captain America, often with teenage partner Bucky Barnes, fought and thwarted the Red Skull many times during the war. The heroes also fought the Red Skull when they were members of the Invaders. On one occasion the Red Skull captured, drugged, and brainwashed Captain America. He sent the hero to kill a high-ranking officer, but with Bucky's help Captain America broke free. The Red Skull later temporarily brainwashed three of the Invaders into serving him. The Red Skull and Captain America continued to engage in a series of skirmishes throughout the war.

After the renowned military officer Baron Wolfgang von Strucker had a falling-out with Hitler, the Red Skull sent Strucker to Japan to found an organization that would prepare the way for takeovers in the Far East under the Red Skull's leadership. In the Far East, Strucker joined a subversive organization that came to be known as Hydra, severed his ties with the Red Skull, became head of Hydra and made it into a major threat to world peace.

As World War II raged on, Hitler vowed that if he could not conquer the world, he would destroy it. To achieve this end, the Red Skull proposed the construction of five gigantic war machines, to be called the Sleepers, which would be hidden in various locations while they generated and stored the power they would need, and then be released at a future date, "Der Tag" ("The Day" in German), to destroy the Earth if the Allies won the war. Hitler enthusiastically instructed the Red Skull to construct the Sleepers, unaware that the Red Skull intended to use them to conquer the world himself if Nazi Germany fell. In the closing days of the war in Europe, Allied intelligence received reports of a Nazi doomsday plan, code-named "Der Tag", to be implemented after Hitler's defeat. However, the Allies had no idea what the plan entailed. The Red Skull sent a number of his subordinates who became known as the Exiles, and a large contingent of loyal German soldiers and their wives to a secret island base ("Exile Island"), where they would organize an army for use in the future.

Now that the German defeat was becoming a reality, the Red Skull was more determined than ever to obtain vengeance for his numerous personal defeats by Captain America and Bucky. The Red Skull assigned Baron Heinrich Zemo to go to England, and, under the cover of stealing an experimental Allied drone plane, to capture or kill Captain America and Bucky. However, the Red Skull was unaware that the Allies had just secretly parachuted Captain America into beleaguered Berlin to investigate "Der Tag". Finally, Captain America tracked the Red Skull down to his hidden bunker. The Red Skull was about to hurl an armed hand grenade at his nemesis when Captain America threw his shield at him. The grenade exploded, but the Red Skull was not killed, due to his body armor. He was, however, seriously hurt and partially buried in debris. Thinking he was dying, the Red Skull defiantly told Captain America that the Sleepers would avenge the Nazis' defeat. Then, suddenly, an Allied attack on Berlin began. An Allied plane dropped a blockbuster bomb on the bunker, causing a cave-in that Captain America barely escaped. Captain America was picked up by the Allies and returned to England only to fall into Zemo's trap, which led to Bucky's supposed death and Captain America's falling into suspended animation for decades. Support pillars that crisscrossed over the Red Skull when the bunker caved in saved him from being struck by tons of rubble when the bomb hit. The cave-in also released an experimental gas from canisters in the bunker which put the Red Skull into suspended animation, during which time his wounds slowly healed.

Johann Shmidt is eventually rescued and revived from suspended animation in modern times by the terrorist organization A.I.M. The Red Skull quickly subverts a cell to his own ambitions of world conquest and the death of Captain America. He steals the Cosmic Cube after taking control of its Keeper's mind with a device he planted while shaking hands, and reveals that he ordered Baron Zemo to steal the bomb plane that led to Bucky Barnes's death. He had a rivalry with Zemo, and hoped to set his two foes against each other. Captain America learns, from the dying pilot of a plane that had been following the Keeper's plane, that the Cosmic Cube had been used to destroy the plane. Shmidt tells another A.I.M. member of his plans after getting a mind control device on him, then causes him to shoot himself. He fights Captain America again for the first time in years after getting the Cosmic Cube on an island. He begins sending Captain America to another dimension when Captain America offers to become his servant. The Red Skull encases himself in a golden suit of armor, and talks of creating a new order of knights. Captain America gets close to him while the Red Skull prepares to knight him. Captain America tries to get the Cosmic Cube, and in the fight the island splits apart from the Cosmic Cube's power, and the Red Skull falls off a cliff while trying to get the Cosmic Cube. When Johann reappears, he and Albert Malik start to antagonize each other while both claiming the Red Skull identity. Finally Malik is the victim of an assassination organized by the Red Skull, through a rogue agent of the Scourges of the Underworld.

The gas that placed the Red Skull in suspended animation wears off and his body rapidly ages to his actual years. Now physically weak and feeble in his mid-80s, the Red Skull plans a final showdown with his archrival. Kidnapping Captain America's closest allies, he forces Captain America to surrender himself to a medical treatment that ages his body to its rightful age. The two men, their bodies now ancient, fight a battle to the death. When Captain America refuses to kill him, the Red Skull dies in Captain America's arms, cursing his enemy as his body shuts down.

Nazi geneticist Arnim Zola had obtained DNA samples of Captain America years earlier and arranged for the Red Skull's mind to be transplanted into a cloned body of Captain America at the moment of his death. Assuming the identity of "John Smith" (the English equivalent of his real name), the Red Skull decides to reinvent himself and his quest for absolute power as a means to celebrate his cheating death. The Red Skull abandons his longstanding beliefs in National Socialism and Hitler, on the belief that the Nazi philosophy made him look like a relic of the past, and turns towards American ideology. The Red Skull sees much potential in the American dream of capitalism and self-determination and sets about establishing his own foothold inside Washington, D.C., culminating in him gaining control over the Commission on Superhuman Activities, a government body in Washington that monitors and regulates superhero activities.

The Red Skull has the Commission remove Steve Rogers from the position of Captain America and replace him with jingoist John Walker. Although Walker attempts to live up to his predecessor's ideals, the Red Skull arranges for the murders of Walker's parents, driving him insane and into a downward spiral of murder as part of his plan to blacken the name of Captain America.

The Red Skull kills his chief pawn in the Commission right in front of Captain America. About to be exposed, the Red Skull tries to manipulate Walker into killing Rogers. When Rogers defeats Walker, the Red Skull appears to gloat at what he had done to Rogers, Walker, and the reputation of Captain America. However, Rogers remains openly dubious of his claims to be his dead archenemy. The Red Skull tries to kill Rogers with a cigarette holding a lethal dose of the dust of death (the Red Skull's favorite poison), but Walker hits him from behind with his shield. The Red Skull inhales the dust of death and his face takes on the appearance of a living red skull; his head loses its hair and its skin shrivels, clinging tightly to his skull, and taking on a red discoloration. The Red Skull survives the exposure due to the effects of the Super-Soldier Formula.

After this, the Red Skull masterminds a conflict between the United States and Symkaria. He joins the "Acts of Vengeance" conspiracy, but is attacked by the mutant terrorist Magneto, a Holocaust survivor who wants to punish him for his involvement in Hitler's regime. Magneto buries him alive with enough water to last a few months. The Red Skull remains imprisoned, close to death and beginning to see the error of his ways, until he is rescued by his henchman Crossbones. Feeling ready to die in peace, the Red Skull requests to be taken to his private estate's bed, and for Captain America to come see him. Upon seeing his archenemy's face, the Red Skull is surprised to feel a sudden burst of hatred that reignites his will to live.

The Red Skull proposes an alliance with the Kingpin to bring a new designer drug to New York, but the Kingpin refuses to ally with the Nazi and the two engage in a drug war. He then defeats the Red Skull in hand-to-hand combat, sparing his life on the condition that he never come near the Kingpin's territory again. After the Red Skull's agents allow Baron Strucker to be reborn, the grateful Strucker allows the Red Skull the use of Hydra resources.

The Red Skull's tenure in Washington comes to an end when he is captured by Hauptmann Deutschland, and taken to Germany to stand trial for crimes against humanity, stemming from his days as a Nazi agent. The Red Skull narrowly escapes and is rescued by Arnim Zola, and forced to fake his death and go into hiding in a Rocky Mountain compound. He recruits the Viper, a move that alienates his minions and is further rocked when his chief henchman Crossbones kidnaps Captain America's girlfriend Diamondback, resulting in Captain America finding the Red Skull's new lair. The Red Skull fires Crossbones and goes into hiding while the Viper, using funds she plied from the Red Skull as part of a scheme to use televisions across America to blind TV viewers, is defeated by Captain America.

The Red Skull discovers that he is facing the same permanent paralysis that Captain America was facing due to their exposure to the Super-Soldier Formula. When Superia offers Captain America a cure, Captain America refuses it because Superia said that Captain America would owe her. The Red Skull takes the cure and apparently kills Superia, then arranges for Captain America to be kidnapped by his remaining forces (including Sharon Carter, whom he found still alive and recruits), and given a blood transfusion that cures him.

Captain America's recovery segues into a reluctant team-up with the Red Skull; a Nazi cult that worshiped Hitler as a god had discovered a Cosmic Cube that contained Hitler's soul, put there by the Red Skull himself. The two try to stop the cult from fully powering Hitler's Cosmic Cube, but the Red Skull opts instead to send Captain America (against his will) into the cube to kill Hitler, imprisoning Captain America in the cube while he uses its power to conquer humanity. Captain America escapes and uses his shield to sever one of the Red Skull's arms, causing him to drop the Cube. The Cube becomes unstable, destroying the Red Skull.

Trapped in a hellish nightmare dimension and forced to serve as a bellhop to a world of non-European immigrants, the Red Skull's will ultimately is so great that he is able to escape his prison. As a result, the Red Skull now possesses limited reality-warping powers. The Red Skull is ambushed by Korvac, who steals his cosmic powers and banishes him back to Earth.

The Red Skull later manipulates his way into the position in the form of US Secretary of Defense Dell Rusk (an anagram of "Red Skull") to develop a biological weapon called "Project Bloodwash" he tested at Mount Rushmore. He is exposed and defeated by the Avengers, with Black Panther beating him so badly that he breaks the Red Skull's jaw in half.

The Red Skull is assassinated by the Winter Soldier under orders from the renegade former Soviet general Aleksander Lukin wanting to possess the new Cosmic Cube the Red Skull had manufactured. When the Red Skull is shot, he attempts to use the Cosmic Cube to switch bodies with Lukin to survive. As the Cosmic Cube is still weak, Red Skull only manages to transfer his mind into Lukin's body, resulting in them occupying the same body and battling for dominance.

In the immediate aftermath of the Civil War, the Red Skull puts his plans into action, arranging for Crossbones to shoot Captain America as he enters a courthouse in New York City; in the ensuing chaos, Carter, acting under Doctor Faustus's mental directive, assassinates Captain America. This is only the first phase of the Red Skull's plan. Upon the discovery of his identity as Lukin, the Red Skull fakes his death, and initiates the second phase of his plan: using the Kronas Corporation's vast holdings to economically cripple the United States, before having S.H.I.E.L.D. agents brainwashed by Doctor Faustus open fire on crowds of protesters in front of the White House. The Red Skull continues his assault by engineering a riot by placing Kronas security troops and drugged water in a protest on the Lincoln Memorial.

As Faustus has surreptitiously tampered with Sharon's programming, she is able to rebel, and before escaping shoots Lukin to death. This is not the end of the Red Skull, since Zola had seconds earlier transferred his mind to one of the spare robotic bodies, but after having his current form damaged by the impostor Captain America, he is unable to return to the Red Skull, trapping him in his robotic form.

It has been revealed that the Red Skull did not kill Steve Rogers, but trapped his body in a fixed position in space and time. He was planning on using Sharon Carter and a machine created by Doctor Doom to return his body back to their time, but since Sharon destroyed the machine, his body is now drifting through time and space. Apparently, it is presumed that the Red Skull intended to transfer his mind into Rogers' body. Norman Osborn decides to assist in completing his plan, as a figurehead of Captain America leading his team of Avengers would increase popularity with as the Iron Patriot. Sin and Crossbones find him and take him to Latveria to place the Red Skull's mind in a living body. The Red Skull, Sin and Crossbones land in Latveria and Doctor Doom confronts them, saying that he would kill them if he was not a man of his word. Doctor Doom and Zola complete the machine and, after Victoria Hand brings Sharon to them, they strap her in. They activate the machine and soon Steve's body returns. When Steve opens his eyes, they are shown to be red, signifying that the Red Skull is now in control. Rogers still resides in the body and during the Red Skull's invasion of Washington, D.C., he and Steve battle in the mind of Steve's body. Steve eventually forces the Red Skull out, placing him back into his robot body. To prevent him from escaping the immediate area, Sharon hits the Red Skull with Pym particles, making him grow to a massive size. While Rogers and the Avengers keep the Red Skull occupied with a team attack, he is destroyed by a missile barrage fired by Sharon on a hijacked A.I.M. battleship.

After being revived, Red Skull works to rebuild his empire. This led him into conflict with the Thunderbolts, who find him hiding out in Latveria. Red Skull is attacked by the Thunderbolts, which ends with Red Skull being killed by Doctor Doom. In the storyline "Avengers: Armageddon", Red Skull battles Captain America when he is sent to Hell. When Doom gains rulership of Hell, he releases the condemned souls of Hell, including Red Skull.

=== George John Maxon ===
Created by Joe Simon and Jack Kirby, George John Maxon appeared as Red Skull in Captain America Comics #1 and #3 (March–May 1941). He faces Captain America during two of the latter's early missions. Maxon is an American businessman and Nazi agent who leads a ring of spies and saboteurs and serves as a stand-in of Johann Schmidt (the true Red Skull). Maxon is thought killed during the second encounter, though he would reappear for one last encounter with Captain America.

=== Albert Malik ===
After the disappearance of Johann Schmidt in 1945, the reputation of the Red Skull was still formidable enough to prove useful. In 1953, Soviet Russian KGB agent Albert Malik set up his spy/criminal organization in Algeria and assumed the Red Skull identity (Russian: Красный Череп), pretending that he was the original, when he was actually serving Soviet interests, in Captain America Comics #61. During the 1950s, he faced the then-active version of Captain America, who was also pretending to be the original. While the Captain and Bucky (Jack Monroe) were placed into suspended animation when his flawed replicate of the Super-Soldier Formula seriously affected his and Bucky's minds, Malik continued his activities, and over time severed his links to the Soviet Union.

He was also responsible for the deaths of Richard and Mary Parker, the parents of Peter Parker, tipped off by the supercriminal Gustav Fiers to their spy status.

Malik was later killed by a Scourge of the Underworld, operating on behalf of the original Red Skull (Johann Schmidt) while disguised as a pilot.

=== Sinthea Shmidt ===
Sinthea "Sin" Shmidt is the daughter of Johann Shmidt. She briefly assumed the Red Skull moniker after being scarred like her father.

=== Clone of Johann Shmidt ===
Following the Avengers vs. X-Men storyline, the Red Skull mysteriously returns and assembles a team called the S-Men. The Red Skull's S-Men attack Rogue and the Scarlet Witch at Professor X's grave and steal Professor X's body. The Red Skull subsequently removes Professor X's brain in a plot to "eradicate the mutant menace". This Red Skull is revealed to be a clone of the original created by Arnim Zola in 1942 and held in cryogenic stasis in the event that Germany lost World War II. Fusing part of Professor X's brain with his own, the Red Skull brainwashes the Scarlet Witch as part of a plot to wipe out the world's mutant population. Using Professor X's telepathy, the Red Skull provokes ordinary citizens of New York into a mass assault against mutants.

During the AXIS storyline, the Red Skull is killed by Magneto, but returns as a giant called Red Onslaught. The Scarlet Witch attempts to cast a spell that will 'invert' the Red Skull and bring out the part of Professor X that still exists in his brain. However, the plan backfires when the resulting spell causes the moral inversion of all heroes and villains in the area. With the villains now the only hope to defeat the corrupted heroes, Captain America is forced to protect the Red Skull (now calling himself the White Skull) from the evil Avengers while Spider-Man works with the inverted villains to fight off the various corrupted heroes. Doctor Doom summons the spirit of Brother Voodoo to possess the Scarlet Witch and invert the spell, with Red Skull sacrificing his heroism and freedom to restore the heroes to normal. The Red Skull is taken away by Doctor Doom.

During the Avengers: Standoff! storyline, the Red Skull infiltrates the S.H.I.E.L.D. facility Pleasant Hill by disguising himself as a priest named Father Patrick. As Patrick, the Red Skull secretly instigates an uprising of the facility's brainwashed inmates by manipulating Baron Helmut Zemo and the Fixer into restoring them to normal. In the aftermath of the battle with the villains at Pleasant Hill, the Red Skull founds his own version of Hydra with Sin and Crossbones.

The Red Skull eventually mounts an assault on the Avengers, using previously planted commands to take control of the team, but Deadpool is able to resist him long enough to place Magneto's old helmet on Rogue's head, rendering Rogue immune to telepathy long enough to knock the Red Skull out and take him to be operated on by Beast. The fragment of Professor X's brain is extracted from the Red Skull, but although Rogers attempts to take custody of the fragment for his own ends, Rogue and Johnny Storm fly up and incinerate the brain fragment, leaving the Red Skull to be taken into 'custody' by Rogers. Although Red Skull is rescued by Sin, she and Crossbones subsequently betray the Red Skull to prove loyalty to Rogers, who kills Red Skull by pushing him over a cliff.

== Powers and abilities ==
Although he has no superhuman abilities, the Red Skull possesses a high intellect and inventive genius and is a highly gifted subversive strategist and political operative. At one point, the Red Skull's mind inhabited a body cloned from Captain America's DNA which possessed the mutagenic alterations induced by the Super-Soldier Formula. He was thus endowed with a body that was in perfect physical condition, with strength, speed, durability, agility, dexterity, reflexes, coordination, balance and physical endurance that exceeded that of an Olympic athlete. Despite the scar tissue covering his face and head, his senses were still above-average. He has been shown as a superb martial artist, though he was never on par with Captain America himself; he was originally trained by German athletes appointed by Hitler. He is heavily trained as a skilled marksman with various forms of handguns and well-versed in the use of firearms and explosives.

While sharing Alexander Lukin's body, he lost his superhuman abilities. Since then, he resides in one of the android bodies engineered by Arnim Zola, with enhanced endurance and resilience.

He typically armed himself with a trick cigarette that could fire a fatal poison gas—his trademark "dust of death"—toward his victim. The "dust of death" is a red powder which kills a victim within seconds of skin contact. The powder causes the skin of the victim's head to shrivel, tighten and take on a red discoloration, while causing all of his hair to fall out; hence the victim's head resembles a "red skull". He also carries a large arsenal of conventional and advanced firearms and explosives.

After fusing his own brain with that of Charles Xavier, the clone of the Red Skull gains powerful telepathic abilities. After being killed in a fight with Magneto, the Red Skull clone temporarily evolved into a psionic entity similar to Onslaught, vastly increasing his original powers while also giving him new ones, ranging from material astral projection, total control over his psionic state producing tendrils, changing size and such, energy projection in the form of optic blasts, on top of greatly enhanced control over his psychic abilities being able to affect minds the world over to initiate worldwide hate. After reverting to his original form, he later expressed frustration with this new power as it makes conquest too easy for him, realizing that he wants people to grovel before him of their own free will, rather than just making people mindlessly submit. The Red Skull eventually loses these abilities when he is captured by Rogue and taken to Beast, who performs surgery on the Red Skull to extract the elements of Xavier's brain from his own.

== Reception ==
=== Accolades ===
- In 2006, Wizard ranked the Red Skull 21st in their "Top 100 Greatest Villains Ever" list.
- In 2013, Complex ranked the Red Skull 16th in their "25 Greatest Comic Book Villains of All Time" list.
- In 2014, IGN ranked the Red Skull 14th in their "Top 100 Comic Book Vilains" list.
- In 2022, Newsarama ranked the Red Skull third in their "Best Marvel supervillains" list.
- In 2022, CBR.com ranked the Red Skull second in their "13 Most Important Marvel Villains" list and sixth in their "10 Most Charismatic Marvel Supervillains" list.

== Other versions ==
Various alternate universe versions of Red Skull have appeared throughout the character's publication history.

=== Amalgam Comics ===
Green Skull is a composite character based on Red Skull and DC Comics character Lex Luthor who appears in Amalgam Comics' DC vs. Marvel.

=== Earth-X ===
An alternate universe version of the Red Skull and his successor Ben Beckley / Skull from Earth-9997 appear in Earth X.

=== Heroes Reborn (1996) ===
In Heroes Reborn (1996), the Red Skull is the banker of Master Man's World Party.

=== Heroes Reborn (2021) ===
In Heroes Reborn (2021), Red Skull was possessed by a Symbiote and re-dubbed himself the Black Skull, becoming the leader of Hydra.

=== Old Man Logan ===
In Old Man Logan, Red Skull is the self-proclaimed President of the United States until he is killed by Old Man Logan.

=== Ultimate Marvel ===
In the Ultimate Marvel universe, Red Skull is the unnamed illegitimate son of Steve Rogers / Captain America and Gail Richards. After his father's presumed death during World War II, he is taken from his mother and raised in an army base. Around the age of 17, he kills over 200 men on the base and cuts off his own face in rejection of his father. As a final symbol of his rebellion against the system that created him, he assassinates President John F. Kennedy.

=== Ultimate Universe ===
In the Ultimate Universe imprint, John Walker is the Red Skull after being burned by Human Torch. There was also a gang named after the original Red Skull.

== In other media ==
=== Television ===
- The Johann Schmidt incarnation of the Red Skull appears in the "Captain America" segment of The Marvel Super Heroes, voiced by Paul Kligman.
- The Johann Schmidt incarnation of the Red Skull appears in Spider-Man (1981), voiced by Peter Cullen.
- The Johann Schmidt incarnation of the Red Skull appears in the Spider-Man and His Amazing Friends episode "Quest of the Red Skull", voiced again by Peter Cullen.
- The Johann Schmidt incarnation of the Red Skull appears in the X-Men: The Animated Series episode "Old Soldiers", voiced by Cedric Smith.
- The Johann Schmidt incarnation of the Red Skull appears in Spider-Man: The Animated Series, voiced by David Warner in the first appearance and later by Earl Boen. This version manipulated John "The Cat" Hardesky in a failed attempt at recreating Captain America's super-soldier serum before being trapped in suspended animation with the latter in the 1940s. In addition, he was also Chameleon's stepfather and Rheinholt Kragov's father.
- The Johann Schmidt incarnation of the Red Skull appears in The Super Hero Squad Show, voiced by Mark Hamill. This version was frozen in a block of ice before he is thawed out by Doctor Doom to help the Lethal Legion.
- The Johann Schmidt incarnation of the Red Skull, with elements of Aleksander Lukin, appears in The Avengers: Earth's Mightiest Heroes, voiced by Steve Blum. This version is a high-ranking commander of Hydra who is disfigured after being injected with an imperfect super-soldier serum by Hydra's leader, Baron Zemo, during World War II. Red Skull's plot to take control of Nordic mythological beasts leads to Captain America's suspended animation and Bucky Barnes' apparent demise. In the present day, Red Skull infiltrates the U.S. government as Dell Rusk, the Secretary of Defense and the leader of Code Red, which consists of the Falcon, Doc Samson, the Red Hulk, and the Winter Soldier. He releases a biological weapon in New York and frames the Avengers for it, sending Code Red to apprehend the superheroes. The Winter Soldier captures and presents Captain America to the Red Skull, but Captain America is able to defeat and publicly expose his old enemy. The Red Skull is remanded to the Avengers' Hydro Base until his Sleepers break him out. He combines the Sleepers into a giant robot to attack Washington D.C. before Captain America and the Winter Soldier work together to defeat the Red Skull and destroy his Sleepers.
- The Johann Schmidt incarnation of the Red Skull appears in Avengers Assemble, voiced by Liam O'Brien. In the first season, he captures Captain America in an attempt to switch bodies with him and extend his longevity. Though the Avengers reverse the process, the Red Skull steals Iron Man's armor and arc reactor and rechristens himself the Iron Skull before forming the Cabal. The Iron Skull later attempts to eliminate his allies until Iron Man reveals his intentions and turns the Cabal against him. Using the power of the Tesseract, the Iron Skull becomes the Cosmic Skull to destroy the Cabal and the Avengers, only to be defeated by both groups and separated from the Iron Skull armor. Despite this, he escapes with the Tesseract and attempts to ally with Thanos. In the second season, Thanos tortures the Red Skull before returning him to Earth to be placed in the Avengers' custody. After surviving the Winter Soldier's kidnapping attempt, the Red Skull escapes to Monster Island with the help of Dormammu's Mindless Ones and creates an impenetrable magic-based force field around it to protect himself from Thanos, but is expelled by Ant-Man and Fin Fang Foom. Following this, the Red Skull makes sporadic appearances in the fourth and fifth seasons.
- The Johann Schmidt incarnation of the Red Skull appears in Phineas and Ferb: Mission Marvel, voiced again by Liam O'Brien.
- The Johann Schmidt incarnation of the Red Skull appears in the Hulk and the Agents of S.M.A.S.H. episode "Days of Future Smash, Part 4: The Hydra Years", voiced again by Liam O'Brien. While traveling through time to stop the Leader, the Hulk encounters Captain America during World War II before both heroes learn of the Leader's plot to turn the Red Skull into the Green Skull via the Hulk's gamma energy. With the Hulk weakened, the Green Skull overpowers and forces Captain America to surrender. In the resulting alternate timeline, the Leader controls Hydra using a wheel-like device powered by the Green Skull. With the help of the Agents of S.M.A.S.H. and an older Captain America, the Hulk is freed and regains his stolen gamma energy from the Green Skull, turning the latter back into the Red Skull while the Leader escapes, restoring the timeline.
  - An alternate timeline dinosaur version of the Red Skull called the Red Skullasaurus appears in "Days of Future Smash, Part 5: The Tomorrow Smashers". The Leader summons it, among other paradoxical creatures, to help him fight the Agents of S.M.A.S.H. However, he is defeated and the creatures are returned to their respective timelines.
- The Johann Schmidt incarnation of the Red Skull appears in Lego Marvel Super Heroes: Maximum Overload, voiced by Chi McBride.
- The Johann Schmidt incarnation of the Red Skull appears in Marvel Disk Wars: The Avengers, voiced by Motomu Kiyokawa in the Japanese version and by Liam O'Brien in the English dub.
- The Johann Schmidt incarnation of the Red Skull appears in Marvel Future Avengers, voiced again by Motomu Kiyokawa in the Japanese version and by Liam O'Brien in the English dub.
- The Johann Schmidt incarnation of the Red Skull appears in Lego Marvel Avengers: Climate Conundrum, voiced by Alex Zahara.
- The Johann Schmidt incarnation of the Red Skull appears in Lego Marvel Avengers: Time Twisted, voiced again by Alex Zahara.
- The Johann Schmidt incarnation of the Red Skull appears in Lego Marvel Avengers: Code Red, voiced again by Liam O'Brien.
- The Johann Schmidt incarnation of the Red Skull appears in Lego Marvel Avengers: Strange Tails, voiced again by Liam O'Brien.

=== Film ===
- An original incarnation of the Red Skull appears in Captain America (1990), portrayed by Scott Paulin. This version is an Italian officer, later Mafioso, named Tadzio de Santis, a prodigy whose family was killed by Axis soldiers who subjected him to the super-soldier formula, leaving him deformed, before erasing his memory to make him loyal to the Axis Powers. While fighting Captain America, the Red Skull cuts off his hand to escape. Years later, he forms a criminal organization with his daughter Valentina de Santis and attempts to brainwash the President, only to be distracted by a recording of his family's death and slammed off a cliff by Captain America.
- The Johann Schmidt incarnation of the Red Skull appears in Heroes United: Iron Man and Captain America, voiced again by Liam O'Brien.

=== Marvel Cinematic Universe ===
The Johann Schmidt incarnation of the Red Skull appears in media set in the Marvel Cinematic Universe (MCU):

- He is introduced in the live-action film Captain America: The First Avenger, portrayed by Hugo Weaving. This version is the head of Hydra, which originally served as the Nazis' deep-science division. Schmidt ordered Dr. Abraham Erskine to use an experimental formula on him, which physically enhanced but permanently disfigured him. As a result, Adolf Hitler nicknamed Schmidt the "Red Skull" and exiled him. While leading an incursion into Norway in 1942, Schmidt recovers the Tesseract and has his chief scientist Arnim Zola develop advanced weapons powered by the object. Disillusioned with the Nazis, Schmidt breaks away from their regime and establishes Hydra as its own force against the Allies and Axis alike with aspirations of world dominion. However, Steve Rogers leads the Allies' fight against Hydra, forcing the group to retreat to their final base in the Alps. In 1945, Schmidt launches his plan to destroy populated cities across the United States, only to be defeated by Rogers and seemingly disintegrated by the Tesseract while attempting to use it.
- Schmidt returns in the live-action film Avengers: Infinity War, portrayed by Ross Marquand. Following the events of The First Avenger, he was transported to the planet Vormir and forced to serve as a "stonekeeper", guiding those who seek the Soul Stone as punishment for his use of the Tesseract. As the Soul Stone requires the sacrifice of a loved one, of which he had none, he was unable to claim it for himself. In 2018, Thanos and Gamora arrive on Vormir to claim the Soul Stone, which Schmidt directs them to. Directors Joe and Anthony Russo stated that, after Thanos claimed the Soul Stone, Schmidt was freed from his curse and permitted to leave Vormir and pursue his own desires.
- An alternate timeline version of Schmidt appears in the live-action film Avengers: Endgame, portrayed again by Marquand.
- Alternate timeline variants of Schmidt appear in the Disney+ animated series What If...?, voiced by Marquand.

=== Video games ===
- The Johann Schmidt incarnation of the Red Skull appears as a boss of Captain America and The Avengers.
- The Johann Schmidt incarnation of the Red Skull appears in the PlayStation 3 and Xbox 360 versions of Marvel Super Hero Squad: The Infinity Gauntlet, voiced again by Mark Hamill.
- The Johann Schmidt incarnation of the Red Skull, based on the MCU incarnation, appears in Captain America: Super Soldier, voiced by Keith Ferguson.
- The Johann Schmidt incarnation of the Red Skull appears as a non-playable character in Marvel Super Hero Squad: Comic Combat, voiced again by Mark Hamill.
- The Johann Schmidt incarnation of the Red Skull and his Dell Rusk alias appears in Marvel Avengers Alliance. This version is the leader of the Dark Avengers.
- The Johann Schmidt incarnation of the Red Skull appears in Lego Marvel Super Heroes, voiced again by Steve Blum.
- The Johann Schmidt incarnation of the Red Skull appears as a playable character in Lego Marvel's Avengers, voiced again by Liam O'Brien. This version sports the "Iron Skull" armor from Avengers Assemble.
- The Johann Schmidt incarnation of the Red Skull appears in Lego Marvel Super Heroes 2.
- The Johann Schmidt incarnation of the Red Skull appears as a boss in Marvel Ultimate Alliance 3: The Black Order, voiced again by Liam O'Brien.
- The Johann Schmidt incarnation of the Red Skull appears in Marvel Future Revolution, voiced again by Liam O'Brien.

=== Literature ===
- The Albert Malik incarnation of the Red Skull appears in the prologue of the novel Spider-Man: The Revenge of the Sinister Six.
- The Albert Malik incarnation of the Red Skull appears in the novel Spider-Man: The Secret of the Sinister Six.
- The Johann Schmidt incarnation of the Red Skull appears in the novel trilogy X-Men: The Chaos Engine. After acquiring the titular engine, a flawed version of the Cosmic Cube, he uses it to create a reality where the Nazis won World War II and established a galactic empire. However, he is opposed by a group of X-Men who were outside of reality when he made his changes and fight to restore the original reality with the help of a young lieutenant who joined the Red Skull, but became disillusioned with him. Following this, he is left drifting outside of reality, with residual energy he had absorbed from other Cosmic Cubes keeping him alive.

=== Miscellaneous ===
- The Johann Schmidt incarnation of the Red Skull appears in Marvel Universe Live!. This version sports the "Iron Skull" armor from Avengers Assemble.
- The Johann Schmidt incarnation of the Red Skull appears in Disneyland Paris' "Marvel Season of Super Heroes".

== Collected editions ==
| Title | Material collected | Published date | ISBN |
|---|---|---|---|
| Captain America vs. The Red Skull | Captain America Comics #1, Tales Of Suspense #79-81 and Captain America (vol. 1) #143, 226–227, 261–263, 370 and material from Captain America Annual #13, Captain America: Red, White & Blue #1 | May 2011 | 978-0785150961 |
| Red Skull: Incarnate | Red Skull (vol. 1) #1-5 | February 2012 | 978-0785152071 |
| Red Skull | Red Skull (vol. 2)#1-3, Captain America (vol. 1) #367, Captain America (vol. 2) #14 | March 2016 | 978-0785198468 |
