= Sharon Carter =

Agent 13
- Artwork from Captain America #29 (August 2007). Art by Steve Epting.

Publication information
- Publisher: Marvel Comics
- First appearance: Tales of Suspense #75 (March 1966)
- Created by: Stan Lee; Jack Kirby; Dick Ayers

In-story information
- Alter ego: Sharon Carter
- Species: Human
- Team affiliations: Daughters of Liberty; Secret Avengers; S.H.I.E.L.D. Avengers; Thunderbolts
- Partnerships: Captain America
- Notable aliases: The Most Dangerous Spy in the World; Agent 13; Gaea-1; Destroyer
- Abilities: Expert markswoman and mistress of various other weapons; Highly trained in espionage, weaponry, and computers; Skilled athlete and martial artist; Expert in hand to hand combat

Sharon Carter (also known as Agent 13) is a character appearing in American comic books published by Marvel Comics. Created by Stan Lee, Jack Kirby, and Dick Ayers, the character first appeared in Tales of Suspense #75 (March 1966). Sharon Carter is a secret agent and an ex-field agent of S.H.I.E.L.D. under Nick Fury. She is the main love interest of the superhero Captain America / Steve Rogers. Sharon Carter was originally the younger sister of Peggy Carter. She was later retconned as Peggy's grand-niece because of the unaging nature of comic book characters.

Emily VanCamp portrays Sharon Carter in the Marvel Cinematic Universe films Captain America: The Winter Soldier (2014) and Captain America: Civil War (2016) and the Disney+ series The Falcon and the Winter Soldier (2021), and voices alternate universe versions of the character in the animated series What If...? (2021).

== Publication history ==
Sharon Carter debuted in Tales of Suspense #75 (cover-date March 1966), created by writers Stan Lee, artist Jack Kirby, and artist Dick Ayers. She appeared in the 1964 Captain America series. She appeared in the 2010 Secret Avengers series. She appeared in the 2022 Captain America: Sentinel of Liberty series.

== Fictional character biography ==
Sharon was born in Richmond, Virginia, the daughter of two wealthy Virginians, Harrison and Amanda Carter. She grew up with the stories of her aunt Peggy Carter, who was a freedom fighter with the French Resistance during World War II.

Inspired by her aunt's adventures, Sharon joins the international security agency S.H.I.E.L.D., and is assigned the code name Agent 13. By this time, Steve Rogers, the patriotic hero known as Captain America, had been revived from suspended animation, and during one of Sharon's earliest missions, he comes to her aid when she is under attack by a mercenary known as Batroc the Leaper. The two of them cross paths often, teaming up on missions against A.I.M., Hydra, Red Skull, and many others.

Sharon and Rogers eventually fall in love, and she becomes one of the first to know his secret identity. The dangerous nature of Sharon's work strains their relationship, and Rogers wants Sharon to give up her life as a S.H.I.E.L.D. agent.

While working as a S.H.I.E.L.D. liaison with the New York Police Department, Sharon investigates and infiltrates a white supremacist terrorist organization known as the National Force. During one of the National Force's battles with street criminals in Harlem, the National Guard is sent in. Under the effects of a mind-altering gas, Sharon apparently activates a self-destruct device in her National Force uniform and dies. It is later revealed that Sharon's death was faked so she could go on a top secret mission for S.H.I.E.L.D., which wound up failing.

=== Return ===
Sharon is left behind in enemy territory, a captive of the dictator Tap-Kwai. Escaping, she spends several years working as a mercenary, until she encounters a group of Neo-Nazi extremists known as the Kubecult. Learning that they plan to use the Cosmic Cube to return Adolf Hitler to life, Sharon joins forces with the Red Skull to stop them.

At this point, Rogers is suffering health problems: the Super-Soldier serum that gave him his abilities is breaking down, and he has fallen into a coma. The Red Skull is currently occupying a cloned body of Rogers himself, and a transfusion of the Skull's blood, which contains an uncontaminated Super-Soldier formula, restores and revives Rogers. Rogers is shocked to find Sharon alive.

=== 21st century ===
In the absence of Nick Fury, Sharon serves a brief term as executive director of S.H.I.E.L.D. She returns to field work, reporting directly to the new executive director, Maria Hill, as a liaison officer specifically assigned to support and report on Captain America's activities. While investigating the whereabouts of Jack Monroe, she is abducted by the Winter Soldier (Bucky Barnes) and used as bait to lure Captain America into a trap set by General Aleksander Lukin. She and Captain America later resume their relationship while on a field mission investigating the activities of the Winter Soldier.

During the "Civil War" storyline, Sharon is initially a supporter of the Superhuman Registration Act, but she is averse to actually aiding in the capture of her lover, Captain America, who is the leader of the "Secret Avengers" opposed to the Act. At the same time, she is an unknowing pawn of the Red Skull and his associate Doctor Faustus. Under Faustus's influence, Sharon participates in the assassination of Steve Rogers. Sharon manages to free herself, killing Aleksander Lukin in the process.

Sharon Carter is featured in the storyline Captain America: Reborn, where she learns that she killed Captain America and plans to figure out a way to revive him. Unfortunately, Norman Osborn also plans to revive Captain America, so that he can complete the Red Skull's plan to transfer his consciousness into Captain America's body and have him lead the Avengers to increase his popularity. He frames Sharon as an accomplice in Captain America' murder and threatens to kill Bucky Barnes if she does not turn herself in, which she does. Red Skull plots to resurrect Captain America and take control of his body. He is thwarted by Captain America, who regains control of his body.

Sharon was a member of an Avengers team, and the Secret Avengers, in Ed Brubaker's series of the same name.

During the "Secret Empire" storyline, Sharon Carter is on the S.H.I.E.L.D. Helicarrier at the time when Captain America, whose history was rewritten by Red Skull's clone using the powers of Kobik to make him a Hydra sleeper agent, reveals his association with Hydra. The Hydra Helicarrier rams into the S.H.I.E.L.D. Helicarrier that Sharon is on as Doctor Faustus arrests her. Sharon pretends to be brainwashed by Faustus and incapacitates him by spiking his tea with a non-lethal toxin.

Sharon Carter later forms the Daughters of Liberty, who work to clear Captain America's name after he is framed for the death of Thunderbolt Ross.

== Powers and abilities ==
Sharon is a highly trained martial artist and extremely adept at various fighting techniques. She is highly trained in espionage, weapons, firearms and computers. After being brainwashed by Doctor Faustus into shooting Captain America, she spent some time training herself to resist similar brainwashing attempts in future, to the extent that she tricked Faustus into thinking he had brainwashed her again and attacked him while his guard was down.

== Reception ==
=== Critical response ===
Deirdre Kaye of Scary Mommy called Sharon Carter a "role model" and a "truly heroic" female character. Joe Anthony Myrick of Screen Rant called Sharon Carter a "popular ally to Captain America." Rob Clough of Looper described Sharon Carter as one of Captain America's "central love interests," writing, "She's a scrappy, clever, and tough agent who never backs down from Cap, despite his status as a living legend. Of all the women that Steve has dated, Sharon is one of the few to truly understand him."

Mark Waid asserted, "The reason she works so well with Cap is because she's a complete cynic and he's a complete idealist." Megan Nicole O'Brien of Comic Book Resources ranked Sharon Carter 1st in their "Every Member Of The Daughters Of Liberty" list, saying, "Sharon Carter aka Agent 13 may not have superpowers, but this does not make her any less heroic," while David Harth ranked her 5th in their "10 Best Directors Of S.H.I.E.L.D." list.

== Other versions ==
=== Earth X ===
An alternate universe version of Sharon Carter appears in Earth X #1, in which she falls victim to a squid-like alien called Hydra.

=== Marvel Mangaverse ===
An alternate universe version of Sharon Carter appears in Marvel Mangaverse. This version is the director of S.H.I.E.L.D.

=== Ultimate Marvel ===
Ultimate Sharon Carter

An alternate universe version of Sharon Carter from Earth-1610 appears in Ultimate Marvel. This version is a practicing Christian and a S.H.I.E.L.D. agent paired with Jimmy Woo who often comes into contact with Spider-Man and believes supervillains should be killed instead of imprisoned. In time, she becomes the acting director of S.H.I.E.L.D.

=== Marvel Future Fight ===
An alternate universe version of Sharon Carter, renamed Sharon Rogers, appears in the mobile game Marvel Future Fight. This version is the daughter of Peggy Carter and Steve Rogers who goes on to inherit the mantle of Captain America after he retires.

== In other media ==
=== Television ===
- Sharon Carter / Agent 13 appears in The Marvel Super Heroes, voiced by Vita Linder.

=== Film ===
A character based on Sharon Carter named Sharon Stewart appears in Captain America (1990), portrayed by Kim Gillingham. This version is a civilian and the daughter of Bernice "Bernie" Stewart. After the Red Skull's daughter Valentina de Santis kills her parents, Sharon accompanies Captain America to Italy to defeat the pair.

=== Marvel Cinematic Universe ===
Sharon Carter appears in media set in the Marvel Cinematic Universe (MCU), portrayed by Emily VanCamp. She appears in the live-action films Captain America: The Winter Soldier (2014) and Captain America: Civil War (2016) as well as the Disney+ miniseries The Falcon and the Winter Soldier (2021). Additionally, VanCamp voices alternate timeline variants of Carter in the Disney+ animated series What If...?.

=== Video games ===
- The Ultimate Marvel incarnation of Sharon Carter / Agent 13 appears in Ultimate Spider-Man, voiced by Jane Hajduk.
- Sharon Carter / Agent 13 appears as a playable character in Marvel: Avengers Alliance 2.
- Sharon Carter / Agent 13 appears in Marvel Heroes.
- Sharon Carter / Agent 13 appears as a playable character in Marvel: Future Fight.
- Sharon Carter / Agent 13 appears as a playable character in Lego Marvel's Avengers, voiced by Jennifer Hale.
- Sharon Carter / Agent 13 appears as a playable character in Marvel Avengers Academy, voiced by Linnea Sage.
- Sharon Carter / Agent 13 appears in Marvel Strike Force.
- Sharon Carter / Agent 13 appears in Marvel Snap.

=== Merchandise ===
The MCU incarnation of Sharon Carter received a figure in Hasbro's Marvel Legends line.
