= Aleksander Lukin =

Fictional comic book character

- Aleksander Lukin; Art by Steve Epting.

Publication information
- Publisher: Marvel Comics
- First appearance: Captain America vol. 5 #1 (January 2005)
- Created by: Ed Brubaker (writer); Steve Epting (artist)

In-story information
- Species: Human
- Team affiliations: Kronas Corporation; KGB; Power Elite
- Notable aliases: General Lukin, Red Skull
- Abilities: Strategic genius, political mastermind

Aleksander Lukin (Russian: Александр Лукин) is a fictional character appearing in American comic books published by Marvel Comics.

== Publication history ==
The character first appeared in Captain America vol. 5 #1 (January 2005), and was created by Ed Brubaker and Steve Epting. He serves as the main antagonist of the first Winter Soldier storyline.

== Fictional character biography ==
Aleksander Lukin was born in the Soviet village of Kronas in the late 1930s. His village is used as the Red Skull's base of operations during World War II. Soviet troops attempt to retake the town, assisted by the Western Allies' Invaders superhero team which include Captain America; Lukin's mother is killed during the battle. The Soviet forces' leader Vasily Karpov takes the orphaned Lukin in as his protege.

In the ensuing decades, Lukin becomes a military general and an important figure in the Soviet military and the KGB. After Karpov's death, Lukin acquires many of his mentor's special projects developed over the decades, including the Winter Soldier (Bucky Barnes). Five years later, the Red Skull recovers the reality-altering Cosmic Cube, only to be assassinated by the Winter Soldier on Lukin's orders. Before his death, the Red Skull uses the Cosmic Cube to transfer his mind into Lukin's body.

Lukin uses the Cosmic Cube to enrich his legitimate business front Kronas Corporation. But when, in a fit of rage, the Cosmic Cube harms one of his friends, Lukin has the Cosmic Cube sent away. After the Winter Soldier destroys the Cosmic Cube and regains his memories, Lukin and the Red Skull uneasily work together against their common foe Captain America, even as the Red Skull attempts to gain control of Lukin's body.

After being killed by Sharon Carter, Lukin is resurrected by his wife Alexa Lukin, with the help of Rasputin and Selene. The Lukins join the Power Elite. As a side effect of his revival, the fragment of Red Skull's mind within Lukin is also revived. Lukin's mind and body are eventually taken over as the Red Skull's body decoy out of a base in Argentina before he is killed by Bucky Barnes and the Thunderbolts.

== In other media ==
=== Film ===
Elements of Aleksander Lukin, namely his role as the Winter Soldier's handler, are incorporated into the Marvel Cinematic Universe's version of Alexander Pierce (portrayed by Robert Redford).

=== Video games ===
- The Kronas Corporation appears in Spider-Man: Web of Shadows.
- The Kronas Corporation appears in Lego Marvel Super Heroes.
