= Bucky Barnes =

Marvel Comics fictional character

- Bucky Barnes as Winter Soldier, with his World War II and Captain America incarnations in the background on the textless cover of Winter Soldier #1 (Feb. 2012). Art by Lee Bermejo.

Publication information
- Publisher: Marvel Comics
- First appearance: As Bucky: Captain America Comics #1 (March 1941); As Winter Soldier: Captain America #6 (May 2005); As Captain America: Captain America #34 (January 2008); As Revolution: Captain America: Sentinel of Liberty vol. 2 #6 (November 2022)
- Created by: Joe Simon; Jack Kirby

In-story information
- Alter ego: James Buchanan "Bucky" Barnes
- Species: Human mutate-cyborg
- Team affiliations: Avengers; New Avengers; All-Winners Squad; Invaders; Legion of the Unliving; Liberty Legion; Thunderbolts; U.S. Army; Young Allies
- Partnerships: Captain America; Falcon; Black Widow
- Notable aliases: The Winter Soldier; Captain America; Revolution
- Abilities: Infinity Formula granting: Enhanced strength, speed, agility, reflexes, stamina, vitality, and resiliency to injury; Cybernetic left arm granting : Enhanced reaction time; Superhuman strength; Holographic projector; Energy projection; EMP discharger; Master in the use of military weapons and throwing knives; Master hand-to-hand combatant and martial artist; Expert assassin and spy; Expert marksman; Polyglot

James Buchanan "Bucky" Barnes is a character appearing in American comic books published by Marvel Comics. Originally introduced as a sidekick to Captain America, the character was created by Joe Simon and Jack Kirby and first appeared in Captain America Comics #1 (cover-dated March 1941) (which was published by Marvel's predecessor, Timely Comics). Barnes' original costume (or one based on it) and the Bucky nickname have been used by other heroes in the Marvel Universe over the years.

The character is brought back from supposed death as the brainwashed assassin cyborg called the Winter Soldier (created by Ed Brubaker and Steve Epting) (Russian: Зимний Солдат, translit. Zimniy Soldát). The character's memories and personality are later restored, leading him to become a dark hero in search of redemption. He temporarily assumes the role of Captain America when Steve Rogers was presumed to be dead. During the 2011 crossover Fear Itself, Barnes is injected with the Infinity Formula, which increases his natural vitality and physical traits in a way similar to (but less powerful than) the super-soldier serum used on Captain America. After coming into contact with the shadowy Outer Circle, Barnes becomes the new Revolution, bringing down the organization from within.

Bucky Barnes has been adapted into various media outside comics, including animated series and video games. Sebastian Stan portrays the character across multiple entries in the Marvel Cinematic Universe, including Captain America: The First Avenger (2011), Captain America: The Winter Soldier (2014), Ant-Man (2015), Captain America: Civil War (2016), Black Panther (2018), Avengers: Infinity War (2018), Avengers: Endgame (2019), the miniseries The Falcon and the Winter Soldier (2021), the animated series What If...? (2021–2024), Captain America: Brave New World (2025), Thunderbolts* (2025) and the upcoming Avengers: Doomsday (2026).

== Publication history ==
When Joe Simon created his initial sketch of Captain America for Marvel Comics precursor Timely Comics in 1940, he included a young sidekick. "The boy companion was simply named Bucky, after my friend Bucky Pierson, a star on our high school basketball team", Simon said in his autobiography. Following the character's debut in Captain America Comics #1 (March 1941), Bucky Barnes appeared alongside the title star in virtually every story in that publication and other Timely series, and was additionally part of the all-kid team the Young Allies. In the post-war era, with the popularity of superheroes fading, Bucky appeared alongside team-leader Captain America in the two published adventures of Timely/Marvel's first superhero group, the All-Winners Squad, in All Winners Comics #19 and #21 (Fall–Winter 1946; there was no issue #20).

After Bucky was shot and seriously wounded in Captain America Comics #66 (April 1948), he was succeeded by Captain America's girlfriend Betsy Ross, who became the superhero Golden Girl. Bucky recovered and was briefly reunited with Captain America for an appearance in Captain America Comics #71 (March 1949), but otherwise did not appear for the rest of the run. Captain America Comics ended with #75 (Feb. 1950), by which time the series had been titled Captain America's Weird Tales for two issues, with the finale a horror/suspense anthology issue with no superheroes.

Captain America and Bucky were both briefly revived, along with fellow Timely stars the Human Torch and the Sub-Mariner, in the omnibus Young Men #24 (Dec. 1953), published by Marvel's 1950s iteration Atlas Comics. Bucky appeared alongside "Captain America, Commie Smasher!", as the hero was cover-billed, in stories published during the next year in Young Men and Men's Adventures, as well as in three issues of Captain America that continued the old numbering. Sales were poor, however, and the series was discontinued with Captain America #78 (Sept. 1954).

Retroactive continuity, beginning with The Avengers #4 (March 1964), established that the original Captain America and Bucky went missing near the end of World War II and were secretly replaced by then-U.S. President Harry S. Truman with successor heroes using those identities. This retroactively meant that the Bucky who operated with the All-Winners Squad and was later wounded before being replaced by Golden Girl was a different hero (which also explained how Bucky could still be in his mid-teens years after his earliest adventures). Later comics said this second Bucky was a teenager named Fred Davis, and it was established that he and Bucky Barnes had met and befriended each other before the end of World War II. The 1950s version of Bucky was retroactively said to be Jack Monroe, a college student who had been inspired by the exploits of the original Captain America and Bucky Barnes. In the 1980s, Jack Monroe adopted the identity Nomad (an alias Steve Rogers briefly used during the 1970s when he was disillusioned with the U.S. government and the role of Captain America).

The original Bucky regularly co-starred with Captain America in flashback World War II adventures presented in Tales of Suspense #63–71 (March–Nov. 1965). Some of these stories were adaptations of Bucky and Cap's original 1940s stories published by Timely Comics, revising details to establish new canon for the Marvel Universe. Afterward, Bucky Barnes only occasionally appeared in further flashback stories or in dreams and memories that haunted Steve Rogers, who felt guilty for not preventing his death. For a brief time, 1960s stories depicted Rick Jones as Captain America's new sidekick in the modern-day, briefly given the costume and name of Bucky. During the 1980s, Steve Rogers temporarily stepped down as Captain America and was replaced by John Walker, whose friend Lamar Hoskins then adopted the identity and name of Bucky. Lamar changed his name to Battlestar when it was pointed out that "buck" has been a slur used against black men in parts of America.

In 2005, series writer Ed Brubaker returned Bucky from his seeming death near the end of World War II in the story arc "The Winter Soldier". He additionally revealed that Barnes's official status as Captain America's sidekick was a cover-up, and that Barnes began as a 16-year-old operative trained to do things regular soldiers and the twenty-something Captain America normally would not do, such as conduct covert assassinations.

Bucky's death had been notable as one of the few comic book deaths that remained unreversed. An aphorism among comic book fans, known as the Bucky Clause, was that in comics, "No one stays dead except Bucky, Jason Todd and Uncle Ben". However, all three were brought back to life in their respective universes by 2006, though Uncle Ben's status was reverted in the same arc that brought him back to life.

Bucky's death has also been used to explain why the Marvel Universe has virtually no young sidekicks, as no responsible hero wants to endanger a minor in similar fashion. Stan Lee also disliked the plot device of kid sidekicks, saying in the 1970s that "one of my many pet peeves has always been the young teenage sidekick of the average superhero". Roger Stern and John Byrne had also considered bringing Bucky back, before deciding against it. However, in 1990, co-creator Jack Kirby, when asked if he had ever heard talk of resurrecting Bucky, answered: "Speaking completely for myself, I wouldn't mind bringing Bucky in; he represents teenagers, and there are always teenagers; he's a universal character".

A climactic scene of Bucky's return involves Captain America using the reality-altering Cosmic Cube to restore the Winter Soldier's memories. In a later interview, Brubaker clarified that Captain America did not "will" the Winter Soldier to have Bucky's memories and personality, he only used the Cube so the Winter Soldier could remember who he truly was. Therefore, there was no loophole where a later story could claim the Winter Soldier was actually a different character and only believed himself to be Bucky because of Cap.

Barnes became a regular character in the 2010–2013 Avengers series during his time acting as Captain America (when Steve Rogers was believed to be dead) from issue #1 (July 2010) through issue #7 (Jan. 2011), and in issue #12.1 (June 2011). During the 2011 Fear Itself crossover, Barnes is killed but then quickly restored to life by the Infinity Formula, the same chemical that gave Nick Fury enhanced vitality and physical traits, and which itself was a weaker form of the super-soldier serum. Now enhanced in a similar way to Steve Rogers and Fury, Bucky returned to the role of Winter Soldier, this time as a S.H.I.E.L.D. agent in an eponymous series that lasted 19 issues. The first 14 issues were written by Brubaker, with the last story arc written by Jason Latour. Since January 2014, Bucky has been part of the cast of James Robinson's All-New Invaders.

In October 2014, Barnes was the subject of a new series titled Bucky Barnes: The Winter Soldier. The series was written by Ales Kot with art by Marco Rudy. It ran for 11 issues before cancellation.

== Fictional character biography ==
=== Origin and World War II ===
Barnes as Bucky during World War II. Art by the character's co-creator Jack Kirby, from the first page of the comic book series Tales of Suspense #63 (March 1965).

James Buchanan "Bucky" Barnes Jr. is born in Shelbyville, Indiana in 1925. Barnes grows up as an Army brat alongside his younger sister Rebecca. Their mother Winnifred dies when both children are still young. In 1938, their father James Barnes Sr. is killed during a training exercise at U.S. Army Camp Lehigh in Virginia. Bucky and Becca are adopted by their father's colleague Major Samson. Becca is sent to boarding school, while Bucky remains at Camp Lehigh and becomes its unofficial mascot. By his teens, Bucky makes a side-career of smuggling goods into the camp for the soldiers. Engaging in exercises with the soldiers in training, Bucky shows a natural ability for marksmanship and physical combat.

Bucky meets and befriends Steve Rogers at Camp Lehigh in 1941. During this same time, newspapers and radio programs share news of a mysterious new hero called Captain America, a man who was turned into a super-soldier via a special serum and technology developed by Abraham Erskine. Bucky accidentally discovers Steve's secret identity after walking into his quarters; Steve decides to recruit Bucky as his partner, personally training him to become a fierce combatant. The two are members of the Invaders alongside Namor, the android Human Torch, and Toro.

When the Red Skull captures and hypnotizes the Invaders into serving the Nazis, only Bucky escapes. Bucky recruits help from Jeff Mace, a new masked hero called Patriot, and then broadcasts a call for help from America's crime-fighters so they can stop the Red Skull. Several answer, leading to the formation of the Liberty Legion under Bucky and Mace's leadership. The Red Skull then sends his hypnotized Invaders against the Liberty Legion. During this adventure, Bucky hides his true movements and plans by asking Fred Davis, a batboy for the New York Yankees, to temporarily wear his costume and impersonate him. The Invaders are freed from hypnotic control and return to the European theatre with Bucky, while the Liberty Legion remains as the "homefront" team in the United States. From that point on, both teams aid each other whenever necessary.

In the closing days of World War II in 1945, Bucky and Captain America find Heinrich Zemo trying to destroy an experimental Allied drone plane. When Zemo launches the plane with an armed explosive device on it, Bucky and Captain America jump aboard. Captain America falls off the plane and descends to the Arctic Circle below. Simultaneously, Bucky unsuccessfully tries to defuse the bomb, and it explodes in mid-air before reaching its intended target. With both Bucky and Steve vanishing from the public eye after the plane's explosion, they are assumed dead. In truth, Rogers is frozen alive by the freezing waters of the North Atlantic, the super-soldier serum in his system keeping him alive and in suspended animation.

Soon after the explosion, Bucky is found by USSR General Vasily Karpov and the crew of a Russian patrol submarine. Despite possessing no enhanced traits such as Captain America or any superhuman abilities, Bucky is still alive, his body partially preserved by the freezing waters, and is able to be revived. Along with the loss of his left arm, he has sustained brain damage and amnesia. Realizing that Bucky has retained his learned combat skills, expertise, and combat instincts, Karpov sends him to the secret Soviet agency Department X.

=== Winter Soldier ===
Department X scientists give Bucky Barnes a bionic arm to replace the one he lost. After undergoing hypnotic training, he is used as a secret assassin called the "Winter Soldier." In-between his various covert wetwork missions, he is kept in suspended animation for months and sometimes years at a time. As technology improves, the Winter Soldier's bionic arm is regularly updated. The Winter Soldier is later placed in the care of Karpov's protégé, Russian general Aleksander Lukin. At this point, he has aged little more than ten years since 1945 due to his repeated cryogenic stasis.

Eventually, Lukin sends the Winter Soldier to kill the Red Skull and Jack Monroe. The Skull survives his own assassination by placing his mind inside a damaged Cosmic Cube. On Lukin's orders, the Winter Soldier launches a terrorist attack on Philadelphia, Pennsylvania, killing hundreds and recharging the Cosmic Cube. Sharon Carter, S.H.I.E.L.D. agent and former lover of Steve Rogers, tells Captain America the Winter Soldier looks like Bucky Barnes. Later, S.H.I.E.L.D. director Nick Fury confirms the Winter Soldier's existence, and Steve sees evidence that the assassin is actually Bucky, still alive but brainwashed and unable to remember his true identity. After battling the Winter Soldier, Captain America uses the Cosmic Cube on him, restoring his mind and memories. Overwhelmed by guilt over his actions as an assassin, Barnes crushes the Cosmic Cube and escapes.

Shortly afterward, the Winter Soldier helps Captain America fend off a terrorist attack in London. He then asks Nick Fury for employment and new equipment. Soon after this, the Superhuman Registration Act (SHRA) demands that all superheroes become registered operatives of the government, unable to act without authorization, or be imprisoned without trial. This leads to a superhuman Civil War, with Steve Rogers defending unregistered heroes from being imprisoned by Tony Stark and those who believe in enforcing the SHRA despite the cost. This leads to the eventual surrender and arrest of Steve Rogers, in exchange for amnesty for any heroes who were against registration before but now choose to comply. The Winter Soldier helps Fury plan the escape of Steve Rogers. Before they can act, Rogers is seemingly assassinated by a hypnotized Sharon Carter.

=== The new Captain America ===
Bucky Barnes as Captain America. Art by Alex Ross.

Realizing Tony Stark will oversee the appointment of a new Captain America, the Winter Soldier steals Captain America's shield so that it cannot be handed down. The Red Skull has Doctor Faustus attempt to brainwash the Winter Soldier. After he fails, Barnes escapes and is captured by S.H.I.E.L.D., which is now led by Tony Stark. Tony reveals Steve Rogers left a letter asking him to watch over Barnes and requesting the Captain America legacy continue. Stark suggests Barnes become the new Captain America. Barnes agrees to do so only if Stark guarantees him complete autonomy, freeing him from the Superhuman Registration Act, and has S.H.I.E.L.D. telepaths seek out and eliminate any subliminal Department X commands still present in his mind. Barnes adopts a new Captain America uniform laced with adamantium. To compensate for the fact that he is not a super-soldier such as Steve, having not been treated with the super-soldier serum or Erskine's "vita-rays", he carries a pistol and a combat knife along with the shield.

A time travel incident transports sixteen-year-old Bucky Barnes and the Invaders from 1941 to the present-day, where they encounter the Mighty Avengers and the New Avengers. At one point, the teenage Barnes encounters his present self. Without revealing his true identity, Barnes attempts to change history by telling his younger self not to disarm the bomb on the experimental plane in 1945. The teenage Barnes ignores this, allowing his life turn out the way it should rather than risk causing unforeseen damage by changing history.

In the 2009 storyline "Captain America: Reborn", Barnes finds out Steve Rogers was not killed, but has been trapped in a fixed position of time and space. A machine intended to bring him back is damaged, causing Rogers to relive his own past. The Red Skull possesses Rogers and attacks Barnes, but is ultimately defeated, with Rogers regaining control of his body. In the aftermath, Rogers and Barnes simultaneously operate as Captain America. Following the Siege of Asgard, Rogers returns the shield to Barnes and retires his uniform officially, deciding to now operate as a maskless hero and leaving Barnes as the only active Captain America.

With Barnes' identity becoming public, he is put on trial for the crimes he committed as the Winter Soldier. He is found not guilty in an American court, but Russian officials take him away, holding him responsible for crimes against the state and claiming he killed two civilians. Sharon Carter and Black Widow discover Barnes' victims were not civilians but in fact connected to the Red Room, the same covert assassination program that created the Black Widow operatives. Barnes escapes imprisonment and returns to the United States, but believes he may be too tainted by the past to continue as Captain America.

=== Fear Itself and return as Winter Soldier ===
During the Fear Itself storyline, Bucky takes up the Captain America identity again, but is apparently killed in battle with the villain Sin (temporarily empowered by Asgardian forces as Skadi). Bucky is revived and restored by the Infinity Formula, the same chemical used on Nick Fury during World War II. This increases Bucky's vitality and physical abilities, though to a lesser degree than Steve Rogers. With the world believing the new Captain America to be dead, Bucky secretly returns to covert operations, now working for S.H.I.E.L.D. and the US military. Only Rogers, Nick Fury, and Black Widow know the Winter Soldier is back in operation.

During the Avengers: Standoff! storyline, Bucky and Steve Rogers learn S.H.I.E.L.D. never discarded a dangerous project involving Kobik, a girl empowered as a living Cosmic Cube. Their investigation leads them to the town of Pleasant Hill, where Steve Rogers is seemingly restored to his prime by Kobik. Bucky and the heroes do not realize that Rogers is actually his alternate universe counterpart, who was created by Kobik. He has been loyal to Hydra since World War II and secretly plans to use his influence to achieve worldwide domination.

During the Secret Empire storyline, Captain America, now Supreme Commander of Hydra, begins his final moves to take over the United States. Helmut Zemo uses Kobik to send Bucky Barnes back in time to World War II, attempting to kill him. However, Bucky returns to the present and defeats Captain America, restoring his original self.

== Powers and abilities ==
Trained by Steve Rogers (the original Captain America) and others in the lead-up to World War II, "Bucky" Barnes is proficient in hand-to-hand combat, martial arts, and the use of military weapons such as firearms and grenades. He occasionally used throwing knives and served as an advance scout. His years as the covert Soviet agent known as the Winter Soldier sharpened these skills further, making him a match for Rogers in combat and a trained assassin and spy. He is fluent in several languages, including English, Spanish, Portuguese, German, Russian, Latin, and Japanese. He also understands French.

Winter Soldier's left arm is a cybernetic prosthetic with superhuman strength and enhanced reaction time. The arm can function when not in contact with Barnes and can discharge an EMP causing electronics to either shut down or become useless.

As a result of gaining the Infinity Formula, Bucky Barnes has enhanced vitality. His general strength, resiliency to injury, speed, stamina, and agility are also greater than a normal human being of his size and physical build. None of his traits operate on superhuman levels (not counting the use of his cyborg arm) and he does not operate at the level of a super-soldier such as Steve Rogers.

As Captain America, he possesses the original, indestructible, vibranium-steel alloy shield used by his predecessor, as well as a Kevlar/Nomex blend shock-absorbing costume. He often carries several conventional weapons such as knives, guns, and grenades. His costume was designed by Alex Ross with input from Ed Brubaker, Steve Epting, and Tom Brevoort. Ross aimed to maintain the elements he saw as symbols of Captain America, such as the winged helmet and the "A" emblem, while updating the costume to make it feel modern. The artist drew inspiration from Rogers' appearance in the 1940s, integrating the shape of the original triangular shield in the form of the breastplate of Barnes' costume, and replacing the chain mail with chrome armor, which Barnes wears over a plain black outfit.

== Reception ==
=== Critical reception ===
IGN called Bucky Barnes one of the "most iconic superhero sidekicks of the Golden Age," writing "this troubled soldier now wields the mantle of his mentor and fights injustice as the new Captain America. Though that shield may be changing hands again, Bucky has long since cemented his place as one of the central players in the Marvel Universe." George Marston of Newsarama described Bucky Barnes as one of the "best superhero sidekicks of all time," asserting "How do you go from being a hackneyed character of a bygone age to being one of the most popular characters in modern comics? That's the story of Bucky Barnes, who in the past ten years has defied all expectations, following his unlikely return from death."

=== Accolades ===
- In 2011, IGN ranked Bucky Barnes 53rd in their "Top 100 Comic Book Heroes" list.
- In 2012, IGN ranked Bucky Barnes 8th in their "Top 50 Avengers" list.
- In 2015, BuzzFeed ranked Bucky Barnes 30th in their "84 Avengers Members Ranked From Worst To Best" list.
- In 2020, Comic Book Resources (CBR) ranked Bucky Barnes 4th in their "Marvel: Every Version Of Captain America" list and 6th in their "25 Best Anti-Heroes In Marvel Comics" list.
- In 2021, CBR ranked Bucky Barnes 4th in their "10 Strongest Marvel Sidekicks" list.
- In 2021, CBR ranked Bucky 7th in their "10 Smartest Marvel Sidekicks" list.
- In 2022, Collider included Bucky Barnes in their "10 Strongest Superhero Sidekicks in Marvel Comics" list.
- In 2022, Newsarama ranked Bucky Barnes 3rd in their "Best superhero sidekicks of all time" list.
- In 2022, CBR ranked Bucky Barnes 3rd in their "Thunderbolts' 10 Best Leaders" list and 5th in their "Marvel's 10 Best Infiltrators" list.

== Other versions ==
Several alternate universe versions of Bucky Barnes have appeared throughout the character's publication history. In the universe of Bullet Points, Barnes is a U.S. Army colonel. In House of M, Barnes is a government agent who is killed by Magneto after being sent to kill him. In Secret Wars, the Barnes of Earth-16832 was inspired by the heroism of Sam Wilson and joined the Super Soldier program with Steve Rogers. In the Ultimate Marvel universe, Barnes is a press photographer who is married to Gail Richards. In the Ultimate Universe imprint, Barnes is the leader of the Red Skull Gang, a neo-Nazi organization. He joined the group as part of an undercover operation at Nick Fury's insistence.

== In other media ==
=== Television ===
- Bucky Barnes appears in the "Captain America" segment of The Marvel Super Heroes, voiced by Carl Banas.
- Bucky Barnes/Winter Soldier appears in The Avengers: Earth's Mightiest Heroes, voiced by Scott Menville and Jon Curry respectively. Throughout World War II, Barnes assisted Captain America in combating Hydra until he sacrificed himself to save the former. In the present, Captain America unknowingly uses the Cosmic Cube to revive Barnes, who is captured by Hydra and becomes the Winter Soldier. Barnes works under the Red Skull until Captain America discovers what happened to Barnes and frees him of his brainwashing so they can defeat the Red Skull.
- Bucky Barnes appears in The Super Hero Squad Show episode "World War Witch!", voiced by Rod Keller. This version is a member of the Invaders.
- Bucky Barnes/Winter Soldier appears in Avengers Assemble, with the former voiced by Robbie Daymond and the latter voiced by Bob Bergen (in "Ghosts of the Past"), Roger Craig Smith (in "Spectrums"), and Matt Lanter (in "The Vibranium Curtain"). This version is a mercenary who was previously brainwashed by Heinrich Zemo.
- Bucky Barnes appears in Marvel Disk Wars: The Avengers, voiced by Daisuke Kishio in the original Japanese version.
- Bucky Barnes as the Winter Soldier appears in Marvel Future Avengers, voiced by Masayoshi Sugawara in Japanese and Yuri Lowenthal in English. This version is initially a member of the Masters of Evil before regaining his memories.
- Bucky Barnes as the Winter Soldier makes a non-speaking cameo appearance in the Spider-Man episode "Vengeance of Venom".

=== Film ===
The Ultimate Marvel incarnation of Bucky Barnes appears in Ultimate Avengers, voiced by James Arnold Taylor.

=== Marvel Cinematic Universe ===
Sebastian Stan portrays Bucky Barnes/Winter Soldier in media set in the Marvel Cinematic Universe (MCU) as part of a nine-picture deal with Marvel Studios. Barnes first appears in Captain America: The First Avenger before making subsequent appearances in the films Captain America: The Winter Soldier, Captain America: Civil War, Avengers: Infinity War, Avengers: Endgame, Captain America: Brave New World, and Thunderbolts*, as well as the Disney+ miniseries The Falcon and the Winter Soldier. Additionally, Stan voices alternate timeline variants of Barnes in the animated series What If...?, and will reprise the role in the upcoming film Avengers: Doomsday.

=== Video games ===
- Bucky Barnes as the Winter Soldier appears as a mini-boss in Marvel: Ultimate Alliance, voiced by Crispin Freeman. Due to the game being in development before the conclusion of the character's reintroduction in the comics, he appears as a member of Doctor Doom's Masters of Evil despite retaining his memories.
- Bucky Barnes as the Winter Soldier appears in the Wii, PS2 and PSP versions of Marvel: Ultimate Alliance 2.
- Bucky Barnes as the Winter Soldier appears in Marvel Super Hero Squad: The Infinity Gauntlet.
- Bucky Barnes, based on the MCU incarnation, appears in Captain America: Super Soldier, voiced by Sebastian Stan.
- Bucky Barnes as Captain America and the Winter Soldier appear as separate playable characters in Marvel Super Hero Squad Online, voiced by Mikey Kelley and Yuri Lowenthal respectively. Additionally, the Winter Soldier also appears as a boss.
- Bucky Barnes as the Winter Soldier and Captain America appear in Ultimate Marvel vs. Capcom 3 as a card in the "Heroes vs. Heralds Mode" and an alternate skin for Steve Rogers / Captain America respectively.
- Bucky Barnes as the Winter Soldier appears in Marvel Heroes, voiced by David Hayter.
- Bucky Barnes as the Winter Soldier appears as a DLC character in Lego Marvel Super Heroes, voiced by James Arnold Taylor.
- Bucky Barnes as the Winter Soldier appears in Captain America: The Winter Soldier - The Official Game, voiced again by Roger Craig Smith.
- Bucky Barnes as the Winter Soldier appears as a playable character in Marvel Avengers Alliance.
- Bucky Barnes as the Winter Soldier appears as a playable character in Marvel Contest of Champions.
- Bucky Barnes as the Winter Soldier appears as an assist character in Disney Infinity 2.0.
- Bucky Barnes as his original alias, his MCU incarnation, the Winter Soldier (original and MCU), and Captain America all appear as separate playable characters in Lego Marvel's Avengers, voiced by Scott Porter. He first appears in the story mode's third chapter, which is based on his role in Captain America: The First Avenger, while the Winter Soldier serves as the boss of the "Out of Insight" bonus level, which is based on his role in Captain America: The Winter Soldier.
- Bucky Barnes as the Winter Soldier appears as a playable character in Marvel: Future Fight. Additionally, Barnes as Captain America appears as an alternate costume.
- Bucky Barnes as the Winter Soldier appears in Marvel Avengers Academy, voiced again by Jon Curry.
- Bucky Barnes as the Winter Soldier appears as a playable character in Marvel Puzzle Quest.
- Bucky Barnes as the Winter Soldier appears as a DLC character in Marvel vs. Capcom: Infinite, voiced again by Scott Porter.
- Bucky Barnes as the Winter Soldier appears as a playable character in Lego Marvel Super Heroes 2.
- Bucky Barnes as the Winter Soldier appears as a non-playable character in Marvel Ultimate Alliance 3: The Black Order, voiced by Ray Chase.
- Bucky Barnes as the Winter Soldier appears in Marvel Dimension of Heroes, voiced again by Robbie Daymond.
- Bucky Barnes as the Winter Soldier appears as a downloadable playable character in Marvel's Avengers, voiced again by Scott Porter. This version woke up on A-Day before he was captured by Monica Rappaccini of A.I.M. and imprisoned in a space station for experimentation purposes. In the present, the Avengers eventually rescue him and offer him membership so they can undo his brainwashing.
- Bucky Barnes as the Winter Soldier appears in Marvel Snap.
- Bucky Barnes as the Winter Soldier appears as a playable character in Marvel Rivals.
