= Fenris (comics) =

Marvel Comics characters

- Andreas von Strucker / Swordsman and Songbird as depicted on the cover of Thunderbolts #113 (April 2007). Art by Billy Khoy and Richard Isanove.

Publication information
- Publisher: Marvel Comics
- First appearance: Uncanny X-Men #194 (June 1985; Andrea von Strucker and Andreas von Strucker); Uncanny X-Men #200 (December 1985; as Fenris); New Thunderbolts #2 (January 2005; Andreas von Strucker as the Swordsman); Thunderbolts #122 (September 2008; Andrea von Strucker's clone)
- Created by: Chris Claremont (writer); John Romita Jr. (artist)

In-story information
- Alter ego: Andrea von Strucker; Andreas von Strucker
- Species: Human mutants
- Team affiliations: Assembly of Evil; Thunderbolts
- Notable aliases: (Andreas): Swordsman; Baron Strucker
- Abilities: (Andrea): Disintegrative energy projection (Andreas): Concussive bolt projection Sword usage (Both): Skilled hand-to-hand combatant Force blasts and flight while in physical contact

Fenris (Andrea von Strucker and Andreas von Strucker) are two supervillain characters appearing in American comic books published by Marvel Comics. They are the German twin children of supervillain Baron Strucker of Hydra and the half-siblings of Werner von Strucker.

The two characters appear in The Gifted.

== Publication history ==
Created by Chris Claremont and John Romita Jr., the von Strucker twins first appeared in Uncanny X-Men #194 (June 1985) in their civilian identity and in Uncanny X-Men #200 (December 1985) as Fenris.

== Fictional character biography ==
Andrea and Andreas are the children of Hydra leader Wolfgang von Strucker. While the two are still in their mother's uterus, they are genetically modified by Arnim Zola. This gives them bio-energy powers which they can use when in physical contact with one another, usually when holding hands. Strucker indoctrinates his children in the beliefs of white supremacy, Nazism, and the Fourth Reich. In adulthood, the twins become the supervillains known as Fenris and lead the terrorist organization of the same name.

Like their father, they are white supremacists. The Strucker twins go up against Storm when Storm interrupts Andreas's attempted assault on a native woman in Africa. Andrea retaliates for Storm's humiliation of Andreas by shooting her in the head and leaving her to die. The Strucker twins despise Magneto for his role in their father's seeming death years after World War II. They conduct acts of terrorism and attack Magneto during the trial in Paris by the International Court of Justice for crimes against humanity. The X-Men foil their assassination attempt, but the twins escape.

Fenris later resurfaces as part of the Upstarts, who engage in a murderous campaign as part of a game organized by the Gamesmaster and Selene. The twins try to acquire Omega Red for the Upstarts, but fail. The twins attempt to kill Wolfsbane of the New Mutants, but are thwarted by Wolfsbane and X-Factor.

The twins join a conference of powerful criminal leaders who intend to divide up what is left of the Kingpin's fallen empire. Among the members of the conference are Slug, Hammerhead, Tombstone, and Werner von Strucker. The twins do not believe that Werner is actually their sibling. This and other arguments cause a fight to break out in the conference room. Fenris attempts to kill Hammerhead, who is rescued. Their sibling is later killed by their father attending the conference disguised as Werner's assistant. The twins resurface and are seen working with Baron Strucker. They fight Citizen V, who Andrea discovers is housing Helmut Zemo's mind. Zemo kills Andrea to keep her from telling anyone the truth.

After Andrea's death, Zemo has Purple Man brainwash Andreas into taking the alias of Swordsman. Purple Man has Andreas remove Andrea's skin and incorporate it into his sword, allowing it to channel their shared powers. Andreas breaks free of Purple Man's control and joins the Thunderbolts. Teammate and field leader Moonstone approaches Andreas with an offer: if he helps kill Songbird, Moonstone will be able to make a move to usurp Norman Osborn, the Thunderbolts' director.

Under the control of four imprisoned telepaths, Andreas takes over the title of Baron Strucker and shaves his head in his father's honor. He gains the loyalty of guards by paying them well and orders them to set off a bomb in the Zeus, the Thunderbolts' carrier, to initiate a lockdown. Andreas declares to one of his guards that Osborn will bring him back his sister or everyone in Thunderbolts Mountain will be killed. After most of his guards are killed, Strucker kills off the remaining attacking guards. He then encounters Venom declaring to eat Strucker. The two fight and Strucker runs Venom through with his sword. Osborn snaps and attacks Andreas, crucifying him to a wall with his daggers.

Andreas survives Osborn's attack and later learns that Andreas had Arnim Zola create a clone of his sister. Although Andreas has Andrea back, he wants to complete his Thunderbolts contract, leaving as a free man. To protect Andrea while on missions, Andreas skins his arm, giving the flesh to Andrea to hold and allowing her to use their shared powers. Andrea accompanies Andreas and the Thunderbolts during the battle against the Skrulls. After Moonstone incapacitates Andreas and attempts to make a deal with the Skrulls, Andrea attacks Moonstone, but is killed by Bullseye.

Andreas confronts Osborn with the revelation that he was not offered a slot on the Dark Avengers, as well as never planning on resurrecting Andrea or receiving a pardon. Osborn has a moment of insanity and stabs Andreas through the chest with his own sword, apparently killing him.

Through unspecified means, Andrea's clone and Andreas are resurrected and open "Club Fenris", a supervillain club in Manhattan. They are also residents of the mutant nation of Krakoa.

During the "Fall of X" storyline, Grant Rogers recruits Fenris to join the Mutant Liberation Front.

== Powers and abilities ==
As a result of genetic engineering with their X-Genes when they were still in utero, Fenris have powers, but only when they are in physical contact with each other.

Andreas can generate concussive force blasts while Andrea generates disintegrating beams.

As Swordsman, Andreas uses various hidden blades; his primary sword blade is sheathed in an adamantium alloy and can shoot a grappling hook-like projectile. His sword's hilt is wrapped with Andrea's skin to release bioelectric blasts of concussive force.

== Other versions ==
Several versions of the Fenris twins have appeared throughout the characters' publication history.

- In House of M, the Struckers are members of their father Baron Strucker's resistance against mutants and the Kree until they are killed in action.
- In Marvel Noir, Andreas von Strucker is an agent of Weapon X.
- In the Ultimate Marvel universe, the Struckers are able to generate heat rather than energy.

== In other media ==
=== Television ===
Fenris appears in The Gifted, with Andreas von Strucker portrayed by Paul Cooper (younger) and Carsten Norgaard (older) and Andrea von Strucker portrayed by Caitlin Mehner (younger) and Julia Farino (older). This version of the duo are mutant terrorists who were active in the late 1940s and early 1950s. Additionally, Andreas possesses telekinesis while Andrea has molecular forcefield creation, with the two being able to produce destructive light energy when in physical contact. Horrified by their actions, Andreas's son Otto runs away from them and manages to suppress the X-Gene after years of conducting research on his son Reed to prevent the threat from returning. However, Reed's children Lauren and Andy Strucker inherit Fenris' abilities.

=== Film ===
- Andrea von Strucker, as Viper, appears in Nick Fury: Agent of S.H.I.E.L.D., portrayed by Sandra Hess. This version is Werner von Strucker's half-sister.
- Fenris were originally slated to appear in Dark Phoenix as members of the Hellfire Club, but were ultimately cut from the film.

=== Video games ===
Andreas von Strucker as the Swordsman appears in the PSP version of Marvel: Ultimate Alliance.
