= One World Under Doom =

2025 comic by Marvel Comics

- Cover to One World Under Doom #1 featuring an assortment of characters bowing before Doctor Doom

Publication information
- Publisher: Marvel Comics
- Format: Limited series
- Genre: Superhero
- Publication date: February 12, – November 19, 2025
- No. of issues: 9
- Main character(s): Doctor Doom; Fantastic Four; X-Men; Avengers; Masters of Evil

Creative team
- Written by: Ryan North
- Penciller: R. B. Silva
- Colorist: David Curiel

One World Under Doom is a 2025 comic book event, focusing on the super villain Doctor Doom who brings about a new world order after gaining the title of the Sorcerer Supreme. It is written by Ryan North, with art by R.B. Silva.

== Publication history ==
Marvel advertises the comic book event as one of its biggest changes to its status quo since 2008's Dark Reign. Editor Tom Brevoort said that "One World Under Doom is the umbrella, impacting not just The Rise of Emperor Doom, but the entire Marvel Universe. To the Avengers, Spider-Man and more... Doom is going to impact every corner of the universe for 2025."

The main story is followed by tie-in comics such as Doom Academy by MacKenzie Cadenhead and Pasqual Ferry, among other series.

== Plot ==
=== Main plot ===
Six months following his ascension as Sorcerer Supreme, Doctor Doom announces that all the world is now the global country of United Latveria and that he is enacting a welfare state agenda in which he declares war illegal, mandates free universal healthcare, and offers free public education to all people of the world. In response, the Avengers meet to oppose Doom, believing that he is either influencing world leaders via mind control or has them replaced by robotic duplicates. Helmut Zemo attacks Latveria, but is killed personally by Doom and replaced with an obedient Doombot replica who surrenders Hydra to him. In addition, Doom claims a Tyrannosaurus version of himself from an alternate universe where dinosaurs never went extinct to serve as his steed. (Note: This unidentified reality was seen in Fantastic Four (vol. 7) #12.)

Doom's actions have since pleased some of the people of Earth. The Fantastic Four are not convinced and plan to confront him. Valeria Richards sneaks off to see Doom, who tells her that he plans to gain glory. The next day, Doom has world borders opened up so that all the nations can work together. The Fantastic Four confront Doom, where they find that he is defended by civilians who are prepared to go down for him. Before allowing the Fantastic Four to leave, Doom does what Mister Fantastic has failed to do by restoring the Thing to his human form. Scarlet Witch plans to lead every espionage agents and magic users as part of a plan to get close to the world leaders and uncover why they are supporting Doom, while Black Widow and the others serve as a distraction. Captain Marvel reveals that she is willing to accept help from the Masters of Evil: Arcade, Baron Mordo, Doctor Octopus, MODOK, Madelyne Pryor, and Mysterio.

When Mysterio questions Captain Marvel's battle plans, Scarlet Witch states that the fight with Doom will be a diversion so that Mysterio, Baron Mordo, and Madelyne Pryor can get into the minds of the world leaders. At the Latverian border, Captain America, Captain Marvel, Doctor Octopus, Iron Man, MODOK, Storm, and Vision draw out Doom. Elsewhere, Scarlet Witch, Pryor, and Mordo enter the minds of the world leaders. They inform the others that the world leaders are following Doom willingly and that he never controlled their minds. The Avengers are forced to leave Latveria to thwart a prison break at the Raft. Dormammu witnesses the events and claims that Doom is ignorant on his responsibilities.

The Fantastic Four, the X-Men, the Champions, Alpha Flight, and Doom's steed are transported into a collapsing pocket dimension by Dormammu. Doom confronts Dormammu as they engage in a magic battle. Using a Doombot as a distraction, Doom attacks Dormammu, who summons demons from a portal that Doom tries to close. To fight the demons, Doom copies the powers of Cyclops, Human Torch, and Wolverine. Doom sends the Doombots into the pocket dimension as they help him free the heroes.

The Avengers, the X-Men, Invisible Woman, Squirrel Girl, Spider-Man, Miles Morales, Brain Drain, and Doom's steed help Doom fight Dormammu. Scarlet Witch severs Dormammu's connection with the Dark Dimension and Invisible Woman punches him. Doom recovers the Eye of Agamotto and casts a spell to return Dormammu to the Dark Dimension. The next day, the Avengers, the X-Men, Invisible Woman, and Brain Drain help with rescue efforts at the United Nations. Everyone questions on if Doom has turned over a new leaf. Maria Hill appears, stating that Doom is hiding something big and that it will take all of them to get to it.

Outside of Latveria, Hill has Black Widow, Invisible Woman, and Scarlet Witch strike a weak spot in the dome. The group discovers a mix of blood magic, chaos magic, and time magic inside as a million souls are being harvested to empower Doom's magic. This information is transmitted to Mister Fantastic, who makes it public. Mister Fantastic becomes the Scientist Supreme, attacks Doom, and pulls him into the astral plane, only to be easily overpowered and knocked out of the astral plane.

Valeria decides to contact Doom in the mindscape and begs him to stop. Doom states that everything has a cost as he takes down Beta Ray Bill and ends his discussion with her while sending her out of the mindscape. Back in Latveria, Hill states that the Tyrannosaurus version of Doom has been taken down and that Mister Fantastic survived his battle with Doom. Storm and Human Torch attack Doom by combining their powers to create a fiery hurricane, but he retaliates and temporarily removes the powers of the mutants present. Doom alters time, making the preceding events a fixed moment in time that cannot be altered or prevented. He then detonates his armor, sending its shards flying throughout the battlefield. Valeria is mortally wounded by the shards and attempts to confront Doom, but dies before his eyes.

Doom is devastated over Valeria's sacrifice and takes her body to the Vishanti as he tries to get them to listen to him. After failing to convince the Vishanti to resurrect Valeria, Doom meets with Living Tribunal. The Tribunal agrees to resurrect Valeria after Doom states that he intends to pay the price for his actions. The news media covers the aftermath as some people still support Doom and blame the heroes for his defeat. Shortly afterward, Doom asks Mister Fantastic to take good care of "his world" and disintegrates. Mister Fantastic discovers Doom's will hidden in his mask, which leaves Latveria and his other possessions in the hands of whoever can take care of it.

=== Aftermath ===
The United States military retrieves Thunderbolt Ross, who was imprisoned during Doom's rule, to bring him back to the United States. Ross hears that Doctor Doom has "disappeared" and that the United States want their flag removed from Latveria. The Fantastic Four go through Doom's last will and testament, which names Valeria as his sole heir. After dealing with a group of Doombots, Ross is allowed to act as a consultant in dealing with the remaining weapons of mass destruction in Latveria. (Note: Ross's story is continued in the miniseries Dungeons of Doom.)

== Issues involved ==
=== Prelude issue ===
- Fantastic Four (vol. 7) #28

=== Main issues ===
Title	Issues	Writer(s)	Artist(s)	Colorist(s)	Premiere date	Finale date	Ref
One World Under Doom	#1–9	Ryan North	R. B. Silva	David Curiel	February 12, 2025	November 19, 2025	

=== Tie-in issues ===
Title / Issues	Writer(s)	Artist(s)	Premiere date	Finale date	Ref
Doom Academy #1–5	MacKenzie Cadenhead	Pasqual Ferry, João M.P. Lemos	February 19, 2025	June 25, 2025	
Storm (vol. 5) #5	Murewa Ayodele	Lucas Werneck	February 19, 2025		
Thunderbolts: Doomstrike #1–5	Collin Kelly and Jackson Lanzing	Tommaso Bianchi	February 19, 2025	May 21, 2025	
Weapon X-Men (vol. 2) #1	Joe Casey	ChrisCross	February 19, 2025		
X-Factor (vol. 5) #7	Mark Russell	Bob Quinn	February 19, 2025		
Fantastic Four (vol. 7) #29–33	Ryan North	Cory Smith	February 26, 2025	June 25, 2025	
Red Hulk #1–10	Benjamin Percy	Geoff Shaw	February 26, 2025	November 12, 2025	
Doctor Strange of Asgard #1–5	Derek Landy	Carlos Magno	March 5, 2025	July 9, 2025	
NYX (vol. 2) #9 (Note: "X-Manhunt" storyline)	Collin Kelly and Jackson Lanzing	Francesco Mortarino	March 5, 2025		
The Amazing Spider-Man (vol. 6) #69–70 (Note: "The 8 Deaths of Spider-Man" storyline.)	Joe Kelly	Ed McGuinness	March 12, 2025	March 26, 2025	
Iron Man (vol. 6) #6–10	Spencer Ackerman	Julius Ohta	March 12, 2025	July 23, 2025	
Doom's Division #1–5	Yoon Ha Lee	Minkyu Jung	March 26, 2025	July 23, 2025	
Superior Avengers #1–6	Steve Foxe	Luca Maresca	April 16, 2025	September 10, 2025	
The Avengers (vol. 9) #25–28	Jed MacKay	Valerio Schiti	April 23, 2025	July 2, 2025	
Avengers Academy: Marvel's Voices Infinity Comic #43–45	Anthony Oliveira	Carola Borelli	May 14, 2025	May 28, 2025	
Runaways (vol. 6) #1–5	Rainbow Rowell	Elena Casagrande	June 11, 2025	October 29, 2025	
Astonishing Avengers Infinity Comic #21–23	Steve Orlando	Andrés Genolet	July 10, 2025	July 24, 2025	
G.O.D.S.: One World Under Doom #1	Ryan North	Francesco Mortarino	July 30, 2025		
Fantastic Four (vol. 8) #2–3	Ryan North	Humberto Ramos	August 13, 2025	September 17, 2025	
Doomed 2099 #1	Frank Tieri	Delio Diaz, Frank Alpizar	August 27, 2025		

=== Aftermath issue ===
Title / Issues	Writer(s)	Artist(s)	Premiere date	Ref
The Will of Doom #1	Chip Zdarsky		December 24, 2025	

== Collected editions ==
Title	Issues collected	Format	Writers	Artists	Pages	Out	ISBN
Main series
One World Under Doom	One World Under Doom #1-9	TPB	Ryan North	R. B. Silva	216	Feb 10, 2026	978-1302958169
Tie-ins
Amazing Spider-Man: The 8 Deaths Of Spider-Man	Amazing Spider-Man (2022) #61-70	TPB	Joe Kelly	Ed McGuinness	304	Jul 22, 2025	978-1302961961
Avengers by Jed Mackay Vol. 5: Masters Of Evil	Avengers (2023) #25-30	TPB	Jed Mackay	Valerio Schiti, Andrea Broccardo, Farid Karami	144	Dec 23, 2025	978-1302960773
Doctor Strange Of Asgard	Doctor Strange Of Asgard #1-5	TPB	Derek Landy	Carlos Magno	120	Nov 4, 2025	978-1302964375
Doom Academy	Doom Academy #1-5	TPB	MacKenzie Cadenhead	Pasqual Ferry, Joao Lemos	128	Feb 17, 2026	978-1302961688
Doom's Division	Doom's Division #1-5	TPB	Yoon Ha Lee	Minkyu Jung	120	Feb 24, 2026	978-1302962845
Fantastic Four By Ryan North Vol. 6: Our World Under Doom	Fantastic Four (2022) #29-33, Giant-Size Fantastic Four (2024)	TPB	Ryan North, Fabian Nicieza	Joshua Cassara, Cory Smith, Creees Lee	136	Oct 21, 2025	978-1302960797
Iron Man Vol.2: The Insurgent Iron Man	Iron Man (2024) #6-10	TPB	Spencer Ackerman	Julius Ohta, Michael Dowling, Yasmine Putri	112	Dec 9, 2025	978-1302958824
Red Hulk Vol.1: Prisoner Of War	Red Hulk (2025) #1-5	TPB	Benjamin Percy	Geoff Shaw	120	Oct 21, 2025	978-1302959265
Red Hulk Vol.2	Red Hulk (2025) #6-10	TPB	Benjamin Percy	Geoff Shaw	112	Mar 10, 2026	978-1302962753
Runaways: Think Of The Children	Runaways (2025) #1-5	TPB	Rainbow Rowell	Elena Casagrande	120	Feb 10, 2026	978-1302963972
Superior Avengers	Superior Avengers (2025) #1-6	TPB	Steve Foxe	Kyle Hotz, Luca Maresca	144	Feb 24, 2026	978-1302960315
Thunderbolts: Doomstrike	Thunderbolts: Doomstrike #1-5	TPB	Collin Kelly, Jackson Lanzing	Tommaso Bianchi	120	Feb 17, 2026	978-1302962838
X-Factor by Mark Russell Vol. 2: Know Your Enemy	X-Factor (2024) #6-10	TPB	Mark Russell	Bob Quinn	112	Sep 2, 2025	978-1302960223

== Reception ==
Evan Valentine of ComicBook.com pointed that the idea of Doctor Doom having the title of Sorcerer Supreme had been teased for some time before being properly used in this comic. He praised that the comic raised the question among readers about whether Doom may not be actually in the right in the conflict. Valentine also praised that the Avengers did not have to fight him physically but also in front of public opinion, and that Doom (whose characterization includes a vast intellect) initially wins the resulting battle of wits. He also praised the bickering between Spider-Man and the Human Torch, and the absurdity of Doom riding a Tyrannosaurus version of himself.

Rich Johnston of Bleeding Cool opined that while NYX (vol. 2) #9 is officially part of the X-Manhunt crossover event, it is also an unofficial part of a second event storyline as the issue "does more for One World Under Doom than any of the other crossovers so far". He highlighted that the issue showcases New York City with Doom as its regent.
