= Werner von Strucker =

Fictional comic book character

- Werner von Strucker as depicted in Nomad (vol. 2) #4 (June 1992).

Publication information
- Publisher: Marvel Comics
- First appearance: Nick Fury, Agent of S.H.I.E.L.D. Vol. 2 #1 (September 1989)
- Created by: Bob Harras

In-story information
- Alter ego: Werner von Strucker
- Team affiliations: Hydra
- Notable aliases: Alexander Braun
- Abilities: Leadership skills Resource accessing

Werner von Strucker is a fictional character appearing in American comic books published by Marvel Comics. He is the son of Baron Strucker and the half-brother of the Fenris Twins.

Spencer Treat Clark portrayed Strucker in the Marvel Cinematic Universe television series Agents of S.H.I.E.L.D..

== Publication history ==
Werner von Strucker first appeared in Nick Fury, Agent of S.H.I.E.L.D. Vol. 2 #1 and was created by Bob Harras.

== Fictional character biography ==
Werner von Strucker is the oldest son of Baron Wolfgang von Strucker and the older half-brother of twins Fenris (Andrea von Strucker and Andreas von Strucker).

Werner briefly takes over Hydra while his father is presumed dead. He uses his influence to attempt to gain control of the Kingpin's territory after he falls from power.

The Punisher's associates Microchip and Mickey Fondozzi pose as Four and Eight, members of the Secret Empire, and infiltrate a meeting between Strucker and several other criminal organizations. The real Four and Eight do not attend the meeting, causing the Secret Empire to believe that they have betrayed them. They send Chainsaw to attack Strucker.

Werner survives the attack. He attends a later meeting of the criminal organizations, assisted by a man who he learns is his father Baron Strucker resurrected. The Fenris twins cause a violent battle at the meeting, believing Werner to be an unworthy successor to their father. After the meeting breaks up, Strucker kills Werner with the Death Spore virus.

== Powers and abilities ==
Werner von Strucker has expert leadership skills. He also has access to various financial and scientific resources.

== In other media ==
- Werner von Strucker appears in Nick Fury: Agent of S.H.I.E.L.D., portrayed by Scott Heindl.
- Werner von Strucker appears in Agents of S.H.I.E.L.D., portrayed by Spencer Treat Clark. This version is a member of Hydra who is also known as Alexander Braun. After Strucker fails to kill Andrew Garner, Grant Ward has him beaten, leaving him comatose. S.H.I.E.L.D. acquires Strucker, whose condition had gone from comatose to vegetative, so Phil Coulson can use the Theta Brain-Wave Frequency Machine on him to get information regarding the location of Gideon Malick. After recovering and being sprung from the asylum he was in, Strucker begins work on translating and rewriting his father's work for General Hale's Hydra branch. Ruby Hale later accidentally kills Strucker after being infused with Gravitonium.
