= Sandra Hess =

Swiss actress and model (born 1968)

- Born: 27 March 1968 (age 57); Zürich, Switzerland
- Occupation(s): Actress, model
- Years active: 1992–2012
- Spouse: Michael Trucco (m. 2009)
- Website: sandrahess.com (defunct)

Sandra Hess (born 27 March 1968) is a Swiss former actress and fashion model. She is best known for her role as Sonya Blade in the film Mortal Kombat Annihilation (1997), and Lieutenant Alexandra "Ice" Jensen on the television series Pensacola: Wings of Gold (1998–2000).

== Life and career ==
Hess began modeling and working on television commercials when she was 15. After completing high school, she entered the University of Zurich to study law but before completing her degree she came to the United States to build an acting career.

Once settled in Los Angeles, Hess started taking acting classes. Her first role was in the 1992 film Encino Man, playing a cavewoman to Brendan Fraser's caveman character. In 1997, she played the role of Sonya Blade in the film Mortal Kombat Annihilation, taking over the role played by Bridgette Wilson in the first film. In 1998, she portrayed Immortal bounty hunter Reagan Cole, a friend of Duncan MacLeod's, in the ninth episode of the sixth season of Highlander: The Series.

She also portrayed Andrea von Strucker / Viper in the TV movie Nick Fury: Agent of S.H.I.E.L.D. and Alexandra "Ice" Jensen in Pensacola: Wings of Gold. Her guest spots include the series Lois & Clark: The New Adventures of Superman, Sliders (Season 4 – Genesis), SeaQuest DSV, and CSI: Crime Scene Investigation.

In 2008, Hess starred as Sasha on General Hospital. In 2010, she had a guest role on Psych.

She married actor Michael Trucco in July 2009; they were wed in Mexico. She and Trucco both played the parts of lieutenants in the same unit of the Marines in the Pensacola: Wings of Gold series. Hess retired from acting in 2012.

== Filmography ==
Film
Year	Title	Role	Notes
1992	Encino Man	Cave Nug	
1993	The Big Gig	Sandy	Short film
1994	Endangered	Kate	
1996	Beastmaster III: The Eye of Braxus	Shada	TV film
1997	Nightwatch	Student	Uncredited
1997	Mortal Kombat Annihilation	Sonya Blade	
1998	Beach House	Alex	
1998	Nick Fury: Agent of S.H.I.E.L.D.	Andrea Von Strucker / Viper	TV film
2002	Face Value	Cat Nelson	
2004	Gargoyle: Wings of Darkness	CIA Agent Jennifer Wells	
2006	One Way	Dr. Evelin Sage	
2008	Remarkable Power	Cynthia West	

Television
Year	Title	Role	Notes
1994	Blue Skies	Tai	Episode: "A Kiss Is Just a Mess"
1995	seaQuest DSV	Dr. Karen Sommers	Episode: "Something in the Air"
1995	Lois & Clark: The New Adventures of Superman	Lisa Rockford	Episode: "Super Mann"
1996	Baywatch Nights	Nicki Schachter	Episode: "Takeover"
1996	High Tide	Mary McAdams	Episode: "Big Brother"
1998	Highlander: The Series	Reagan	Episode: "Deadly Exposure"
1998	Sliders	Marta	Episode: "Genesis"
1998–2000	Pensacola: Wings of Gold	Lieutenant Alexandra "Ice" Jensen	Main role; 44 episodes
2000	Titans	Margo Dupree	Episode: "Secrets & Thighs"
2001	18 Wheels of Justice	Katie Caldwell	Episodes: "Hot Cars, Fast Women" "Once a Thief"
2003	CSI: Crime Scene Investigation	Mandy Klinefeld	Episodes: "Assume Nothing" "All for Our Country"
2003	Threat Matrix	Simone Benoit	Episode: "Alpha-126"
2005	Commander in Chief	Patya Kharkova	Episode: "First Dance"
2006	The Young and the Restless	Kara Ludwig	5 episodes
2006	Shark	Whitney	Episode: "Déjà Vu All Over Again"
2006–2007	NCIS	Regine Smidt	Episodes: "Smoked" "Driven" "Blowback" "Trojan Horse"
2008	General Hospital	Sasha Donev	33 episodes
2010	Psych	Svetlana Progoyovic	Episode: "Think Tank"
2012	CSI: NY	Elizabeth Ferguson	Episode: "Who's There?"
