= NYX (2024 series) =

Comic book title

NYX (vol. 2)
- Cover of NYX (vol. 2) #1 by Sara Pichelli and Federico Blee.

Publication information
- Publisher: Marvel Comics
- Schedule: Monthly
- Format: Ongoing series
- Genre: Superhero
- Publication date: July 2024 – April 2025
- Main characters: Ms. Marvel; Wolverine; Anole; Prodigy; Sophie Cuckoo; Kiden Nixon; Synch; Hellion; Local

Creative team
- Written by: Collin Kelly and Jackson Lanzing
- Artists: Francesco Mortarino; Michael Shelfer; Enid Balam
- Letterer: Joe Sabino
- Colorist: Raúl Angulo
- Editor: Annalise Bissa

NYX is the second volume of the American superhero comic book series NYX by publisher Marvel Comics. The series focuses on former X-Men students (especially from Academy X era) and Kamala Khan as they adapt to life in New York City in the post-Krakoan Age when mutants are hated and feared even more due to the actions of Orchis. Laura Kinney (formerly X-23) was the only announced returning character from the original series; Kiden Nixon returned in the second half of the series.

The ongoing series is written by Collin Kelly and Jackson Lanzing with art by Francesco Mortarino. The first issue was released in July 2024 as part of the X-Men: From the Ashes publishing initiative which relaunches the X-Men line. The series ended with the release of issue #10 in April 2025.

== Publication history ==
The second volume of NYX was announced by Marvel Comics' editor-in-chief C.B. Cebulski and VP, executive editor Tom Brevoort during the "Future of Marvel Comics' X-Men and Digital Comics" panel at South by Southwest (SXSW) on March 14, 2024, as part of X-Men: From the Ashes relaunch. In April 2024, it was revealed that the series would focus on young mutants in New York City after the end of Krakoan Age, with only Laura Kinney returning from the original series. Collin Kelly and Jackson Lanzing were announced to be writers and Francesco Mortarino as artist.

Lanzing highlighted that the series influences include pulling Academy X plot lines and characters "forward in this new era" and the noir aspect of Mutant Town in "Peter David's latter-day X Factor". On picking their ensemble cast, Kelly stated "if you only get one chance to write X-Men, you should write the things that you love and care about" and for the writing pair that meant "not necessarily the classics, but finding those characters that exist in the corners who haven't had their full story told". Kelly has "always loved" Anole and "his journey of not only discovering how to be a lizard man but how to be queer within that space" and Lanzing commented that they're "longtime fans of" Prodigy who has to discover what's next after becoming a Cyclops-like figure which "didn't work" out. Lanzing emphasized how Kamala and Sophie contrast each other; Kelly stated that "if Sophie is our bright light, standing to blind everybody, and Kamala is this kind of honest truth, trying to find her way, then Laura knows exactly who she is, or at least she thinks so". Lanzing and Kelly also highlighted that the characters in the series are often burdened by iconography with Lanzing commenting that "the way we're reflecting that is every issue of NYX is titled by the name of the character that it's about – not their mutant name, their human name, because that's the world they're living in right now, and the world they have to start understanding how to operate inside".

Michael Shelfer and Enid Balam were artists for issues #6 and #7, respectively. Mortarino returns as the artist for issues #8–10. NYX (vol 2.) #9 is the second part of the eight-issue X-Manhunt crossover event series which was released in March 2025. Rich Johnston of Bleeding Cool commented that while NYX (vol 2.) #9 is not an "official crossover" for the One World Under Doom event, the issue recognizes it and showcases New York City with Doctor Doom as its regent.

The series ended with issue #10 in April 2025. Lanzing commented that they knew in advance NYX would end so they were able to include a finale for the characters, however, Kamala Khan's story would continue in Giant-Size X-Men (vol. 2) #1 (May 2025). Jonathan Jones of AIPT noted that "the exact reason for the cancellation is unclear, but the book's sales data and a stated desire by Senior X-Editor Tom Brevoort to shift attention away from stories on Krakoan aftermath are likely contributing factors".

== Main characters ==
The series is structured by having a different point of view character for each issue. (Note: Point of view character for each issue: Ms. Marvel – NYX (vol. 2) #1; Wolverine – NYX (vol. 2) #2; Anole – NYX (vol. 2) #3; Prodigy – NYX (vol. 2) #4; Sophie Cuckoo – NYX (vol. 2) #5; Kiden Nixon – NYX (vol. 2) #6; Synch – NYX (vol. 2) #7; Hellion – NYX (vol. 2) #8; Mojo - NYX (vol. 2) #9; Local - NYX (vol. 2) #10)

- Kamala Khan – A mutant/Inhuman hybrid also known as Ms. Marvel who commutes from Jersey City to the Lower East Side of Manhattan. She attends Empire State University (ESU) and is in the "Examinations of Post-Krakoan Diaspora" class.
- Laura Kinney – The former X-23 who now goes by the codename Wolverine; she is a hero in Brooklyn focused on "saving mutants" in the Bushwick area.
- Anole – A former X-Men student and proprietor of the Green Lagoon tiki bar on Krakoa who is now a bartender at a popular New York City bar.
- Prodigy (David Alleyne) – A former X-Men student who now works as a historian with a focus on mutant history. He is a professor at ESU, teaching the diaspora course that Kamala and Sophie are taking.
- Sophie Cuckoo – A former X-Men student attempting to find her way without her identical sisters. She attends ESU and is in the "Examinations of Post-Krakoan Diaspora" class.
- Kiden Nixon – One of Laura's oldest friends from their time in District X (New York City). Lost in the timestream, she was missing during the Krakoan Age and reappears in New York City during a Dazzler concert.
- Synch – A former X-Men student who once led the X-Men; since the fall of Krakoa, he has spent his time wandering before arriving in New York City.
- Hellion – A former X-Men student who went through Krakoa's Crucible resulting in his death and subsequent resurrection via the mutant resurrection protocols; this process restored his hands, which were previously lost in battle during the "Second Coming" storyline. He reappears in New York City as the villain known as the Krakoan.
- Local – A technopath mutant who works for Mr. Friend, a mutant corpse puppeted by Mojo. Mojo eventually assumes direct control of Local and adds Local to his puppet collection.

== Plot summary ==
=== Part 1 ===
Kamala Khan starts attending Empire State University and befriends Sophie Cuckoo who is also enrolled in the same "Examinations of Post-Krakoan Diaspora" class that is being taught by Prodigy. When they visit Anole at his bartending job, they clash with anti-mutant bigots, the Truthseekers. Kamala, as Ms. Marvel, investigates them but is warned off by Wolverine, who believes Kamala is inexperienced in dealing with anti-mutant violence. Kamala saves the Truthseekers from the mutant radical known as the Krakoan, who is later revealed to be Julian Keller. Julian, along with Empath and the other Stepford Cuckoos, forms a new Quiet Council aiming to turn New York into a haven for mutants.

Wolverine investigates a criminal organization led by Mr. Friend, who is revealed to be Mojo, and is injured in the ensuing confrontation. Meanwhile, after repelling a Truthseeker attack, Anole joins the Morlocks who have kept Krakoa's culture alive in their sewer hideout. Kamala uncovers the Krakoan's identity and confronts him, only to be betrayed by Sophie. Prodigy intervenes, rescuing Kamala and defeating Julian. Both Julian and Prodigy are arrested; although Prodigy is released from custody with his attorney's Jennifer Walters' help, he is fired from his teaching position and blacklisted.

The Truthseekers, secretly a front for the Purifiers, start protesting against the mutant presence while the New York City Council votes on a bill to relocate mutants into ghettos. A remorseful Sophie reconciles with Kamala and reveals Empath's involvement in escalating anti-mutant sentiment to accelerate a mutant revolution to take over the city. The mutants and their allies organize a counterprotest, with Sophie breaking the Cuckoos' control over the council and Ms. Marvel delivering a speech for peaceful coexistence where she reveals her mutant status. The council votes against the bill, and the Truthseekers are forced to stand down. The mutants celebrate their victory.

=== Part 2 ===
Kiden Nixon emerges from her timestream to help Laura and her friends prevent Mojo's lieutenant Local from hijacking a Dazzler concert. Prodigy establishes NYX, a community center for both mutants and humans where he continues teaching his curriculum. Believing Prodigy's idealistic approach will bring more harm to mutants, Synch challenges him to a Circle Perilous, an Arakko style duel that ends when an opponent dies or yields. Prodigy convinces him of his intentions and fights him to a stalemate. Meanwhile, Kamala discovers that her cousin Bilal has become an anti-mutant vigilante called the Truthseeker.

While en route to Graymalkin Prison, the prison convoy escorting Julian is ambushed by Wolverine, Sophie and Kiden to rescue him. Although Julian initially refuses to be rescued and is unrepentant for his actions as the Krakoan, he changes his mind after an emotional talk with Wolverine and leaves with the group.

During the events of both "X-Manhunt" and "One World Under Doom", Professor X visits NYX for help reclaiming the last seed of Krakoa from the recently crowned Emperor Doom. Only Ms. Marvel and Anole agree to accompany Xaiver in recovering the seed at the X-Men's abandoned Treehouse, where Doom's emissary Volta and Mojo are bartering for the seed with Fauna acting as Mojo's majordomo. Mojo kills Volta just as Xavier and the others are discovered. Xavier abandons Ms. Marvel and Anole to deal with Mojo alone as he recovers his true prize: his Cerebro helmet. Ms. Marvel and Anole manage to escape from Mojo with the seed. However, Mojo and Fauna reveal that they took a decoy while he possesses the real seed.

Using an unwitting Local as a conduit, Mojo uses the seed's powers to transform New York into Mojo City. Ms. Marvel, Sophie, Wolverine, Anole, Prodigy, Hellion, Synch and their allies rally together to break Mojo's influence over the city and defeat him. Although Local's body disappears, Sophie is able to sense his consciousness within the city. When Bilal confronts the mutants, Kamala reveals her identity to him; Bilal retreats but warns her not to tell her family. While the mutants celebrate, a despondent Kamala distances herself from her mutant friends.

== Reception ==
Jenna Anderson, for ComicBook.com, commented that "NYX #1 is a charming, albeit restrained, menagerie of Marvel's mutant adolescence" – "Francesco Mortarino's art exhibits the sense of liveliness that the script of NYX #1 demands [...]. Raul Angulo's color work bathes everything in vibrant blues and golds without ever losing a sense of realism. Joe Sabino's lettering is expressive". Anderson thought the relaunch could be received in various ways by fans of the first volume as "the dark and often-controversial themes of the previous runs are cast aside, in favor of the xenophobia and overall prejudice that the characters feel post-Krakoa". She opined that the script by Collin Kelly and Jackson Lanzing "does deliver some poignant moments", however, "these moments are only a brief part of the issue's lively storyline – a choice that both conveys the dizziness of being a young adult, and that leaves this particular issue feeling a little shallow". David Brooke of AIPT rated NYX #1 a 9 out of 10. Brooke viewed the first issue as "strong", although a bit focused on Ms. Marvel for a team book, and that the issue "allows its characters to emerge as fully dimensional individuals, serving as an antidote to readers who want more than just action scenes". Brooke opined that "the art by Francesco Mortarino is great, especially the character acting" where "these characters come off the page and feel quite real", and that "for how much dialogue is in this book, Mortarino does not miss". In contrast, Tim Rooney of The Beat gave NYX #1 a "skip" verdict as "structurally, NYX falters out of the gate" and that the book "wastes an exciting character" by burdening her with "a cast of mostly nobodies". Rooney viewed the script by Lanzing and Kelly as underwhelming "despite presenting some interesting ideas" and that while "its stated purpose is to explore how a culture finds community amidst diaspora", it ends up feeling "inauthentic". However, Rooney commented that Mortarino's art "is full of energy" and "elevated by colorist Raúl Angulo's bold, vibrant colors"; the art team makes the main characters seem "stylish and, critically, look like teens" where the only artistic weakness is "that everyone looks young" which "sometimes undermines the script".

Following the release of NYX #7, Chris Miller of Screen Rant commented that "what sets the NYX series apart from the other ongoing X-Men series, is its sense of scale" and its focus on community where the "goal of NYX, both the series and the community center, is to hyper-focus on the day-to-day lives of mutants who don't have the luxury of living in a mansion or a private island". Miller highlighted how it shows Xavier's dream in action with young mutants taking a different approach in accomplishing it and that this group is "quicker to bridge the peace between mutants and humans. They're embracing the better parts of Krakoan and Arakki society while allowing humanity to participate in the culture as well". In a joint review of NYX #9 for ComicsXF, Armaan Babu highlighted the "grounded but delightful vibes" of Mortarino's design work where "everyone's outfit is unique and even seems to say a little about them. It's a refreshing change from characters being either in costume or in something generic". On the issue also being part of the X-Manhunt event, Stephanie Burt opined "extra points for Kelly and Lanzing for pulling off a stunt that anyone writing long term for Marvel must master: They've integrated an editorially mandated crossover without completely derailing the plots, the characters or the ideas at the center of their own book". Jonathan Jones of AIPT similarly noted that NYX #9 "largely succeeds as a satisfying penultimate issue as well as the second part of a crossover". Rich Johnston of Bleeding Cool opined that the issue is part of multiple crossover events and "does more for One World Under Doom than any of the other crossovers so far".

On the cancellation of NYX, Jones commented that the series "has always been an underdog: from the unexpected title, cast composition, and nuanced core concepts, Marvel seemed to continually face difficulty in selling this book, even if it has been widely praised by those who took a chance on it". Jones highlighted that "to the best of their ability, the young heroes of NYX have revitalized the mutant community of New York City over the course of the From the Ashes era" which included the development of "a new Morlock sanctuary under the city" that maintained "Krakoan cultural practices to the best of their ability" along with the use of the NYX Community Center to distribute "material and academic resources for mutants and their allies".

== Awards ==
NYX was nominated for the 2025 GLAAD Media Award for Outstanding Comic Book.

== Collected editions ==
Title	Material collected	Published date	ISBN
NYX: What Comes Next Will Be Marvelous	NYX (2024) #1–5	March 11, 2025	ISBN 978-1-3029-5932-6
NYX: Mojo City	NYX (2024) #6–10	August 20, 2025	ISBN 978-1-3025-3340-3
