= Synch (character) =

- Synch as depicted in Generation X #6 (August 1995). Art by Chris Bachalo.

Publication information
- Publisher: Marvel Comics
- First appearance: X-Men #36 (September 1994)
- Created by: Scott Lobdell; Chris Bachalo; Fabian Nicieza

In-story information
- Alter ego: Everett Thomas
- Species: Human mutant
- Team affiliations: X-Men; Generation X
- Abilities: Power replication; Metabolize bio-energy signatures; Sense and track superpowered beings

Synch (Everett Thomas) is a mutant superhero appearing in American comic books published by Marvel Comics. Created by Scott Lobdell, he first appeared in X-Men #36 (September 1994). Synch was killed in Generation X #70 (December 2000), but resurrected during the Krakoan Age in 2019. In 2021, Synch joined the X-Men team roster in the relaunched flagship book X-Men (vol. 6) written by Gerry Duggan. He would remain on the team during the Reign of X, Destiny of X and Fall of X publishing phases and become the team leader in the final phase. The character also appeared in other related books such as the Immortal X-Men (2022) series and the Rise of the Powers of X (2024) miniseries.

== Publication history ==
Synch first appeared in X-Men (vol. 2) #36 (September 1994), part of the "Phalanx Covenant" event, and was created by writer Fabian Nicieza and artist Andy Kubert.

Synch was killed off in Generation X #70 (December 2000). At the start of the Krakoan Age, as part of the Dawn of X relaunch of all X-Men related titles, Synch was brought back via the mutant resurrection protocols in House of X (2019) #6. During Jonathan Hickman's X-Men (vol. 5) run in 2021, Synch goes on a mission into The Vault. Synch then appeared, debuting in the Hellfire Gala (2021) during the Reign of X relaunch, on the first team roster for Gerry Duggan's X-Men (vol. 6) run. He remained on the X-Men team through the rest of Duggan's run during the Destiny of X and Fall of X phases.

During X-Men: From the Ashes, Synch reappears as the narrator of NYX (vol. 2) #7.

== Fictional character biography ==
=== Generation X ===
X-Men #36. Art by Andy Kubert.

Everett Thomas was born in St. Louis, Missouri. He was first introduced when the mechanical collective race known as the Phalanx had assimilated the X-Men and attempted to wipe out what was to be the next generation of mutant heroes: Husk, Jubilee, Monet, Skin, and Blink, all of whom, with the exception of Blink, would eventually become members of Generation X. Synch synced with Banshee, who was in the area, to defend himself from the Phalanx. However, as a side effect, he shattered all the windows nearby, which drew the attention of the local police. Even as they surrounded him, a few officers had already been infected by the Phalanx and again tried to capture Everett. He was saved by Banshee and Sabretooth, and then quickly helped them prevent yet another Phalanx attack on the White Queen and Jubilee, who had helped locate Everett. The White Queen linked her mind with Everett's and Jubilee's, which allowed Everett to synch with Jubilee and use her powers to a degree she had been afraid to, defeating the Phalanx for the moment.

When Emma Frost's sister Adrienne Frost comes to America, she forces Emma to re-admit her back into the school. If not, Adrienne would release information to the parents of the human students that the Xavier School for Gifted Youngsters was a secret training ground for mutants. When Adrienne plants bombs around the school, Synch sacrifices himself to save the students.

=== Krakoan Age ===
Synch on the textless variant cover of X-Men (Vol. 6) #7 by artists Russell Dauterman and Matt Wilson

Synch is among the many mutants resurrected on Krakoa after it is established as a mutant nation. He is one of the earliest mutants resurrected because his powers allow him to stand in for any of the Five, the group behind the resurrections, if necessary. While physically he was fine, he struggled psychologically with reintegrating into a vastly changed world with peers who have moved on in life. Skin is brought back ahead of schedule to act as a companion for Synch and test if mutants from similar time periods should be brought back in clusters.

Synch assists in exploring the Vault, the base of the Children of the Vault, alongside Darwin and Wolverine (Laura Kinney). Darwin is captured and experimented upon by the Vault's artificial intelligence to create an evolved batch of the Children, forcing Laura to sacrifice herself to let Synch escape. Outside of the Vault, Synch telepathically contacts Xavier and passes on all of his knowledge before he is killed; he is then resurrected with his memories intact. With her status in doubt, Laura is resurrected by the Five, but without her memories of her time inside the Vault or the relationship she had developed with Synch.

During the Reign of X phase, at the inaugural Hellfire Gala X-Men elections, both Synch and Laura are selected to join the team. There are some awkward encounters between the two because Laura is aware of the missing memories and relationship Synch had with the original version of her; Synch decides to not use Jean Grey's abilities to share his Vault memories with Laura. At the next Hellfire Gala, Synch decides to stay on the X-Men team while Laura decides to leave the team. Meanwhile, Forge initiates a rescue mission to retrieve Darwin from the Vault. During the rescue mission, Forge and Caliban discover that Laura survived the mission and was kept alive by the Children of the Vault. Forge takes the original Laura back to Krakoa, where she is reunited with Synch. Afterwards, the two move into the X-Men's Treehouse in New York City and resume their relationship. This Laura, known as Talon, also joins the main X-Men team. During the Destiny of X phase, Synch is forced to take Hope Summers's place in the Five to resurrect her.

During the Fall of X phase, Synch and Talon would go on to lead the X-Men while they were part of the mutant resistance following the attack on Krakoa by Orchis. Together they successfully steal technology to nullify Orchis' poisoned medicine from the High Evolutionary, who retaliates and kills Talon. When Synch later teams up with Wolverine, they mourn Talon together.

=== Post-Krakoan Age ===
Synch spends time wandering before arriving in New York City at a community center for mutants called NYX which is run by Prodigy. Believing Prodigy's idealistic approach will bring more harm to mutants, Synch challenges him to a Circle Perilous, a duel that ends when an opponent dies or yields. Prodigy convinces Synch of his intentions and fights him to a stalemate so Synch relents.

== Powers and abilities ==
Synch's mutant power equips him with a bio-energetic aura that allows him to duplicate the effect of the powers of any superpowered being in or out of his vicinity and sometimes the power itself, essentially becoming "in synch" with that person (or more specifically, their bio-energetic aura). When Synch uses his powers, a multicolored aura appears around his body, created by the energies he is absorbing splitting the ambient light around him. Synch seemingly had greater mastery of his mutant abilities than his peers, often displaying more control over whatever powers he copied than that person. For example, he was also able to utilize Chamber's powers to fly, something Chamber was never able to do. It had been theorized that in time, Synch would have been able to permanently retain any powers he acquired. However, he is not always able to synch with purely physical abilities or abilities that exceed his physical makeup. In House of M, he was able to retain powers permanently as a junior member of S.H.I.E.L.D.

After Synch's resurrection in Dawn of X, Cecilia Reyes noted that Synch's power no longer has a dormant and active state but that his Synchronistic field constantly seeks live connection to other power sets. Also, while before he seemed limited to mimicking only other mutants, he was found to now be able to copy powers from non-mutant sources as well. Synch is now also able to recall powers he had previously copied, though utilizing them from memory puts a strain on his body and can cause him to age significantly.

== Relationships ==
=== Laura Kinney ===
During the Krakoan Age, Synch along with Laura and Darwin spent centuries in The Vault where Laura and Synch eventually developed a romantic relationship. Laura presumably dies after sacrificing herself to give Synch enough time to escape The Vault and reach Xavier. Laura was then revived by The Five without her memories of her time spent in The Vault with Synch. It is later revealed that the original Laura was kept alive by the Children of the Vault when Forge goes to rescue Darwin. Synch and Laura are reunited and move into the X-Men's Treehouse in New York City together. They join the X-Men roster with Laura now going by the codename Talon while Laura's younger duplicate, keeping the Wolverine codename, shifts to X-Force. When the High Evolutionary disintegrates Talon's body, Synch is initially able to support and communicate with a psychic imprint of Talon's mind. However, this occurs after the fall of Krakoa, so there is no way to physically resurrect this version of Laura. Laura convinces Synch to relinquish the strain on his powers and let her imprint go so that he can fight Nimrod. The characters were together for over 1,000 years in the Vault.

Alex Schlesinger, for Screen Rant in 2022, called their reunion "a truly heartwarming one, with the intense and ancient love between Everett and Laura on full display, but because this is happening in an X-Men comic fans of the couple shouldn't get too hopeful, as the future of this tragic romance is still yet to be revealed". Following the death of Talon's body in X-Men #30 (January 2024), Robert Wood of Screen Rant commented that "Synch and Laura's relationship has been filled with heartache and tragedy, and this final twist of the knife confirms things will get worse before they get better – if they ever do". Jonathan Jones of AIPT highlighted the "ominous" use of The Lovers tarot card in the issue as Laura only remains alive as an imprint within Synch's mind – "The Lovers is a card of choice, sacrifices made for or at the cost of relationships; a test that impacts the partners' ability to remain in sync". Jones, in his review of X-Men #31 for AIPT, felt the "emotional beats" of Laura and Synch's final conversation was a bit empty and that the creative team's focus was on addressing the problem of Talon's existence as a character. Jones opined that the arc of their relationship "has ended for the time being, and in the end, it served no one, developed no one, and has not left a lasting impact on the story moving forward. On top of that, the majority of their romance before and after the Vault took place off-panel, making it even harder for readers to find a reason to care"; however, Jones was more positive about artist Phil Noto's portrayal of the characters in the issue as "even if readers don't especially care about Talon and Synch's relationship, the emotional subtleties in their faces are worth a look through. Everett's heartbreak hits even harder as he rises stone-faced against Nimrod while syncing Storm's powers".

== Reception ==
In 2022, Entertainment Weekly ranked Synch 53rd in their "Let's rank every X-Man ever" list.

Charles Pulliam-Moore, for Gizmodo in 2020, highlighted the spotlight on Synch's emotional state following his resurrection as unlike characters such as Jean Grey, "Synch hasn't spent most of his life living and dying and living again. Thus [Cecilia Reyes] believes what is hitting him hardest is to see the ways in which his contemporaries left him behind and have often gone on to deal with their own brushes with death that they've been able to overcome. [...] Coming back this way has to feel bittersweet—not just because it's taken his friends this long to even try a resurrection, but because making up for all that lost time is the sort of feat that not even he could manage". He thought the "seemingly small details like this" are what makes "Dawn of X feel distinctly refreshing and fascinating". Screen Rant, CBR and ComicBook.com noted that Synch's resurrection and time spent replicating the powers of Omega-level mutants would lead to the character having a huge power jump in the Krakoan Age. Screen Rant highlighted that in Venom #14, Madelyne Pryor admits Synch "is the X-Men's 'most powerful member'". CBR commented that changes in Synch's replication powers along with focused training have "taken Synch to the next level when it comes to his powers, allowing him to reach Omega-level powers as long as he's used an Omega-level mutant's power". ComicBook.com commented that "evolving into an omega-level mutant would be a huge character development for Synch" and that "if Synch can truly master retaining different abilities he comes into close proximity with, then he has the potential to be one of the strongest mutants in the Marvel Universe".

Brandon Zachary, for CBR in 2021, commented that the Krakoan Age "has been a good one for plenty of underutilized mutant characters – but perhaps none more so than the roster of Generation X, who've increasingly been given bigger places within the mutant nation" such as Synch who has "been formally elected to the X-Men – where he's repeatedly proven his sheer potential". Rob Bricken of Gizmodo called Synch one of the "more unexpected members" to join the main X-Men team and wondered if Synch "has ever been an 'official' X-Man before". Jones, in his review of X-Men #34 for AIPT, opined that the penultimate issue reiterates how "this book remains the franchise's flagship title in name only, a feeling to which Synch ought to be able to sympathize with by now" and that while Synch is "the ostensible leader of the X-Men", his team is "either cleaning up loose ends or exiting the narrative altogether". He highlighted "a nice moment grieving" between Synch and Wolverine who "have their first proper team-up since the loss of Talon [in X-Men #31], and Everett and Laura remain very respectful about the wild circumstances around their relationship". Jamie Lovett of ComicBook.com similarly commented that "the issue does bring some closure to the Synch/Talon/Wolverine situation that has been at the heart of the book, but with even the considerable artistic talent involved struggling to make something out of what little the script has to offer, X-Men #34 feels like the tail-end of a story stretched too thin".

== Other versions ==
=== Age of Apocalypse ===
In the Age of Apocalypse, Synch was one of the many mutants killed in the war with Apocalypse. His death motivated Jubilee to join Gambit's band of mutant thieves, the X-Ternals.

=== Days of Future Past ===
In the Days of Future Past timeline, Everett became Jubilee's lover, and aided her along with the X-Men of that time to rebel against their oppressors.

=== House of M ===
In the House of M timeline, Synch is a member of a junior S.H.I.E.L.D. division called the Hellions until he is killed in battle.

=== Rise of the Powers of X ===
A future version of Synch appears in Rise of the Powers of X (January 2024), by writer Kieron Gillen and artist R.B. Silva. Set ten years in an alternate future where Orchis is victorious against mutantkind, Synch leads a small group of survivors and is known as the Professor. Synch has prematurely aged due to the strain of replicating powers by memory instead of limiting himself to replicating powers in his proximity. Tristan Benns of Screen Rant commented that "weakened by the containment of his tremendous powers, this timeline's variant Everett Thomas is confined to a hoverchair resembling Xavier's iconic chair from the Mutant Genesis era. Although this timeline is ultimately averted as part of Xavier's experiments with the Moira Engine, Synch's potential as Charles' replacement remains undeniable". Benns called him "a rising star" of the Krakoan Age "with his inclusion in the lineup for the flagship X-Team raising his profile to incredible new heights. As such, seeing Synch finally replace Professor X as leader of the X-Men would ultimately be the culmination of this tumultuous character arc".

== In other media ==
- Synch makes a cameo appearance in X2 in Yuriko's computer files.
- Synch appears in X-Men '97, voiced by Zeno Robinson.
