= Nick Fury: Agent of S.H.I.E.L.D. (film) =

1998 American television movie

- Release poster
- Based on: Nick Fury, Agent of S.H.I.E.L.D.
- Written by: David Goyer
- Directed by: Rod Hardy
- Starring: David Hasselhoff; Lisa Rinna; Sandra Hess; Neil Roberts; Garry Chalk; Tracy Waterhouse; Tom McBeath; Ron Canada
- Music by: Kevin Kiner
- Country of origin: United States
- Original language: English

Production
- Executive producers: Avi Arad; Matthew Edelman; Tarquin Gotch; Bob Lemchen; Stan Lee
- Producer: David Roessell
- Cinematography: James Bartle
- Editor: Drake Silliman
- Running time: 90 minutes
- Production companies: 20th Television; Marvel Entertainment Group
- Budget: $6 million

Original release
- Network: Fox
- Release: May 26, 1998

Nick Fury: Agent of S.H.I.E.L.D. (stylized as Nick Fury: Agent of SHIELD and Nick Fury: Agent of Shield) is a 1998 American television superhero film based on the Marvel Comics character Nick Fury. It was first broadcast on May 26, 1998, on Fox, intended to be a backdoor pilot for a possible new TV series. Written by David Goyer, and directed by Rod Hardy, the film had a $6 million production budget. It stars David Hasselhoff as Fury, a retired super spy who is approached to return to duty to take down the terrorist organization HYDRA, who threaten to attack Manhattan with a pathogen they have reconstituted known as the Death's Head virus. Lisa Rinna plays Contessa Valentina "Val" Allegra de Fontaine, and Sandra Hess plays Andrea von Strucker/Viper. It was released on DVD on September 30, 2008. The film was met with a largely negative reception.

== Plot ==
Agents of the terrorist organization HYDRA invade an S.H.I.E.L.D. facility, killing Clay Quartermain and reviving a cryogenically preserved Baron Wolfgang Von Strucker. Nick Fury, retired and living in an abandoned mine shaft in the Yukon, is approached by S.H.I.E.L.D. agents Alexander Pierce and Contessa Valentina Allegra De Fontaine to return to duty to take down Hydra, now led by the children of Von Strucker, an old enemy of his. Fury refuses to return until he learns of Quartermain's death. He then accompanies Pierce and De Fontaine to a S.H.I.E.L.D. Helicarrier, where he reunites with old friends Dum Dum Dugan and Gabriel Jones, is introduced to telepath Kate Neville, clashes with new S.H.I.E.L.D. Director General Jack Pincer is shown advanced technologies that S.H.I.E.L.D. is developing, including a Life Model Decoy of Fury.

Shown a recording of Quartermain's death, with the killer taunting Fury by name, and informed that the killer was Von Strucker's daughter, codenamed Viper, Fury deduces that Von Strucker's body was taken to harvest a pathogen known as the Death's Head Virus, developed by Arnim Zola to be Hitler's doomsday weapon. Viper calls a meeting of the remaining four Hydra lieutenants from Cairo, Osaka, Prague, and London. She executes the London lieutenant for questioning her authority. Fury learns that Zola is still alive and being kept in a S.H.I.E.L.D. safehouse in Berlin, and Fury and De Fontaine travel there. They rendezvous with local Interpol agent Gail Runciter and proceed to the safehouse, where an elderly Zola, in a wheelchair and requiring an oxygen mask, seemingly overpowers Kate Neville's telepathy with his evil visions of destruction. Runciter lures Fury away from the group and shocks him with a device before revealing herself to be Viper in disguise. She then kisses Fury with poisoned lipstick, leaving him unconscious, enabling Hydra to retake Zola. Fury learns he has 48 hours to live unless he can recover a sample of Viper's DNA from which to develop an antidote.

Hydra threatens to attack Manhattan with the virus, barring payment of US $1 billion, and as proof of their threat, the real Gail Runciter is found, dying from the virus. After Fury and his team brief the President of the United States, Pierce determines from a chip from a laptop sold in the Aleutian Islands that the Hydra base might be there. Fury has his people split into two teams, one led by de Fontaine heading to Manhattan to find the refrigerated truck they believe will be needed to deploy the virus, and the other with Fury leading Pierce and Neville to the Aleutian Islands. Upon arriving in the Aleutian Islands and confirming that a Hydra transmission has come from there, Fury's plane is shot down by heat-seeking missiles. In Manhattan, de Fontaine's team figures out that the refrigerator truck is disguised as a garbage truck, while Fury and his team, having bailed out of the airplane in time, infiltrate the Hydra base.

Fury realizes that it was too easy to get in, just before his team is captured and stripped of their weapons. Viper reveals to him that she will release the virus even if they are paid, and locks Fury and his team in a freezer. Fury reveals that in place of his missing left eye, he keeps an explosive with which they can escape. Reaching Viper's control room, Fury and Viper fight until she gets hold of a gun and shoots him. However, it turns out to be Fury's Life Model Decoy. Fury incapacitates Zola and captures Viper, and Neville uses her telepathy to draw the code to abort the detonation from Viper's mind. The Helicarrier arrives and captures the rest of Hydra's forces, but Viper escapes with the body of her father. Fury decides to return to S.H.I.E.L.D. to counter the new threat of Hydra, while Viper is shown to have restored her father, Baron Wolfgang Von Strucker, to life.

== Cast ==
David Hasselhoff as Nick Fury

- David Hasselhoff as S.H.I.E.L.D. Agent Colonel Nick Fury
- Lisa Rinna as S.H.I.E.L.D. Agent Contessa Valentina "Val" Allegra De Fontaine
- Sandra Hess as Andrea Von Strucker/Viper
- Neil Roberts as S.H.I.E.L.D. Agent Alexander Pierce
- Garry Chalk as S.H.I.E.L.D. Agent Timothy Aloysius "Dum-Dum" Dugan
- Tracy Waterhouse as S.H.I.E.L.D. Agent Kate Neville
- Tom McBeath as S.H.I.E.L.D. Director General Jack Pincer
- Ron Canada as S.H.I.E.L.D. Agent Gabriel Jones
- Adrian G. Griffiths as S.H.I.E.L.D. Agent Clay Quartermain
- Peter Haworth as Dr. Arnim Zola
- Campbell Lane as Baron Wolfgang Von Strucker
- Scott Heindl as Werner Von Strucker
- Mina E. Mina as H.Y.D.R.A. Cairo Lieutenant
- Stellina Rusich as Inspector Gail Runciter
- Rick Ravanello as S.H.I.E.L.D. Agent J. Vaughn
- Roger Cross as S.H.I.E.L.D. Agent #1
- Bill Croft as H.Y.D.R.A. Agent Garotte
- Terry David Mulligan as U.S. President

== Production ==
Plans to create a Nick Fury live action production were circulated as early as September 1986, but it was not until mid-May 1995 that Fox Broadcasting announced the acquisition from New World Entertainment of a Nick Fury series pilot, to be broadcast in 1996. The film was originally sold to Paramount Pictures, with Debra Hill and Lynda Obst as producers, Greg Pruss to write and Stephen Herek originally attached to direct. The teleplay was written by David S. Goyer several years before the film was made, and Goyer was not otherwise involved as he was working on the television series Sleepwalkers. Despite some misgivings within the studio, the producers cast David Hasselhoff in the lead role "to give SHIELD some recognizable star power". The production also markedly "respected and utilized the comic roots of the project", incorporating "a who's who of the Marvel spy scene" and retaining details such as Fury's eyepatch.

Goyer was not enthusiastic about the casting of David Hasselhoff, but in hindsight said, "Hasselhoff turned out to be the best thing in it. He got the joke. The script was meant to be very tongue in cheek, and Hasselhoff understood that. Goyer described the film overall as "pretty mediocre". Hasselhoff was reportedly signed for five additional Nick Fury television films, which did not materialize.

Shooting for the project occurred between May and June 1997 in Vancouver, British Columbia, Canada.

== Reception ==
Reception to the film was largely negative, with praises for its performances such as that of David Hasselhoff, but criticism for lack of execution and dialogue. In 2016 Neil Calloway called it a "schlocky throwaway TV movie" with "some fantastically tongue in cheek quoteable lines...but in all honesty the film has dated like only a bad TV movie shot in Vancouver in the late 1990s could". ScreenRant later described the film as having "mostly disappeared without a trace with mediocre reviews", and Looper included it on its list of the ten worst Marvel movies. The Encyclopedia of Superheroes on Film and Television found that "the production was hampered by weak, two-dimensional performances that bordered on hysteria and camp", and that Hasselhoff "just did not have the gravitas to pull off the role". Den of Geek described it as "a time filler that doesn't stray too far from Marvel's established SHIELD characters but didn't do anything terribly compelling with them either", concluding that it was "a one night wonder that wasn't very wondrous".

The initial television broadcast of the film came in fourth in the Nielsen ratings for that time slot, behind reruns on various other networks.

== Home media ==
Nick Fury: Agent of S.H.I.E.L.D. was released on DVD on September 30, 2008, exclusively at Best Buy stores.
