= Heinrich Zemo =

Baron Zemo
- Heinrich Zemo, the 12th Baron Zemo. Art by Steve Epting.

Publication information
- Publisher: Marvel Comics
- First appearance: Unnamed flashback cameo: The Avengers #4 (March 1964); Full appearance: The Avengers #6 (July 1964)
- Created by: Stan Lee; Jack Kirby

In-story information
- Full name: Dr. Heinrich Zemo
- Team affiliations: Nazi Party; Masters of Evil; Legion of the Unliving
- Abilities: Genius-level intellect; Proficient scientist and engineer; Skilled swordsman, marksman, and hand-to-hand combatant; Slowed aging

Baron Heinrich Zemo is a supervillain appearing in American comic books published by Marvel Comics. Created by Stan Lee and Jack Kirby, the character first made an unnamed cameo appearance in a flashback in The Avengers #4 (1964), before being fully introduced in The Avengers #6 (1964). He is commonly depicted as one of the greatest enemies of Captain America and the Avengers.

Dr. Heinrich Zemo is the 12th Baron Zemo, a high-ranking Nazi scientist during World War II, and the original founder and leader of the supervillain team the Masters of Evil. Zemo gained infamy for his inhumane experiments during the war and concealed his identity by wearing a purple mask, which later became grafted to his face by a chemical adhesive he developed to use against the Allies in a battle with Captain America. Zemo became obsessed with seeking revenge against Captain America, and one of their subsequent confrontations led to the death of Captain America's sidekick Bucky, although this was later reversed. Zemo scientifically enhanced his body and survived to the modern age to oppose Captain America and the Avengers until he was killed in battle, after which he is succeeded by his son Helmut Zemo.

The character has been adapted in various media incarnations, having most notably been voiced by Robin Atkin Downes in The Avengers: Earth's Mightiest Heroes animated series.

== Fictional character biography ==
Heinrich Zemo's original costume

Heinrich Zemo, the 12th Baron Zemo, was one of the top scientists in the Nazi Party. Zemo fought both Captain America and his allies the Howling Commandos during World War II. A brilliant and sadistic scientific genius, Zemo created many weapons of mass destruction for Hitler's army, including a large-scale death ray cannon, a disintegration pistol that was a miniaturized version of his death ray, and primitive androids of considerable strength and durability. Zemo's intelligence was only matched by his sadism, as he routinely tested his deadly weapons on innocent people, both prisoner and civilian, inside the Third Reich. This ultimately came to a head during an early encounter with the Howling Commandos, when Zemo decided to test an experimental death ray cannon on a nearby German town. The death ray killed hundreds of civilians, making Zemo a mass murderer. Though he arrogantly believed that he could frame the Allied Forces for his act of mass murder, Nick Fury and the Howling Commandos exposed Zemo's role in the town's destruction, resulting in Zemo becoming a reviled figure throughout Europe, even amongst his fellow Germans.

In an attempt to regain a level of anonymity, Zemo began wearing a reddish-pink hood over his face as he continued to build weapons for the Nazis. His activities ultimately drew the attention of Captain America, resulting in a confrontation just as Zemo was ready to unveil his newest scientific breakthrough: Adhesive X, an extremely strong adhesive that could not be dissolved or removed by any known process at the time; it was only after the war that Paste-Pot Pete found a way to neutralize it.

To ensure that the Nazis could not use Adhesive X against Allied troops, Captain America confronted Zemo in an attempt to destroy the limited supply. Captain America threw his shield at the vat to release the adhesive onto the ground. Zemo, however, was standing right next to the vat containing the chemical, which poured over his hooded face. The adhesive quickly seeped inside and permanently attached the hood to Zemo's face.

Though Zemo could still see through the eye holes of the hood, as well as hear, breathe, and speak through the thin fabric of the cloth, Zemo could no longer eat normally and had to be fed intravenously. Zemo quickly recovered, but having his hood permanently attached to his face drove him insane. Adopting a new costume, Zemo went from becoming a normal, if not infamous, Nazi scientist to become an active field agent for the Third Reich, leading German troops into combat and espionage missions.

At some point, Zemo battled and killed Citizen V (John Watkins), the leader of the V-Battalion freedom fighters.

When it became apparent that the Nazis would lose the war, the Red Skull sent Zemo to London to steal an experimental airplane. At this point the plane would do them no good, but Red Skull made sure that this knowledge was leaked to Captain America and young sidekick Bucky so as to ensure that Zemo would be caught, thus ridding him of his rival once and for all. Captain America would not learn of Zemo's scheme for several weeks, by which time he would defeat Red Skull for the final time during World War II, burying Red Skull alive in a state of suspended animation. By the time that Captain America learned of Zemo's plot, it was too late and both Captain America and Bucky were taken prisoner by Zemo. Zemo tied the two heroes to the experimental plane, which was now booby-trapped to explode, and launched them to their deaths. Captain America fell from the plane as it exploded, and Bucky was apparently killed. Captain America landed in the Arctic Ocean and was frozen in ice for decades before being recovered by the Avengers.

Believing that he had killed his rival at long last, Zemo fled to South America as Hitler and the Nazis fell and World War II ended. After the mask was permanently bonded to his face, Zemo abandoned his long-suffering wife and his son Helmut, toward whom he had become emotionally and physically abusive. With an army of mercenaries loyal to him, Zemo enslaved a tribe of natives and lived as a king as he tried desperately to find a solvent that would remove his mask. After decades passed, Captain America was revived by the Avengers. This causes Zemo to renew his rivalry with the Captain. Among his attempts included sending agents to take the place of participants of a hand-to-hand combat demonstration with Captain America to capture him. As Captain America learned that Zemo was behind this attack, he sent a taunting message on Zemo's minions' communicator to provoke the villain into becoming more carelessly aggressive against him and thus provide an opportunity for the superhero to deal with the villain directly.

To that end, Zemo formed the original Masters of Evil to serve as a villainous counterpart to the Avengers; the other founding members included the Black Knight, the Melter, and the Radioactive Man who were gathered by his pilot. He tried to have Adhesive X spread over New York, but the Teen Brigade seized Zemo's pilot, preventing him from speaking, then tied him up to stop him causing trouble. They switched the adhesive with remover made by Paste-Pot Pete. Zemo used his sceptre's hypno-ray on the Teen Brigade, placing them under his control. He then battled Captain America using combat skills he had gained, but Captain America began to beat him. The pilot freed himself from his bonds and shot at Captain America from behind. Captain America heard the sound and dodged the bullet, though his skull was grazed. Giant-Man was able to stop the pilot from killing Captain America, thus capturing him. Zemo was tricked into opening a container of tear gas while in his helicopter during his escape back to South America. He is later joined by the Enchantress and the Executioner, who Odin exiled to Earth. The Enchantress hypnotized Thor into attacking the Avengers, while the Executioner had disguised himself as a former ally of Zemo and lured Captain America to South America to fight Zemo. Iron Man broke Thor out of this trance and the Masters of Evil were sent to another dimension by Thor. Zemo later turned Simon Williams into Wonder Man with his ionic ray, and said that Wonder Man would die within a week unless given an antidote which Zemo possessed. Wonder Man was able to capture the Wasp and led the group into a trap where they were defeated. Wonder Man, however, sacrificed himself to save the Avengers.

In his final battle with Captain America, Zemo lured the Captain to his jungle fortress by kidnapping Rick Jones using an attractor ray. His Masters of Evil were broken out of prison and attacked the Avengers, forcing Captain America to go on alone. Zemo raised a glass cage containing Rick out of the ground as Captain America fired at his men, hoping Captain America would kill Rick, but the gunfire only broke open the cage. Zemo tried attacking with his men, but Captain America was able to use a rockslide caused by his shield to block them. In the ensuing battle, Captain America used his shield to deflect the sun's rays and cause Zemo to shoot blindly. His ray gun's shot hit a rock, starting an avalanche that killed him, and Captain America felt that Bucky's death had finally been avenged.

Zemo has largely remained dead since. However, he has appeared as a spirit and was temporarily resurrected as a member of the Legion of the Unliving. During Hercules' journey to the Underworld, Zemo is seen in Erebus, gambling to be resurrected. He is later seen as a member of Pluto's jury at Zeus' trial.

== Reception ==
In 2018, ComicBook.com ranked Baron Zemo 8th in their "8 Best Black Panther Villains" list.

== Other versions ==
- Baron Zemo appears in JLA/Avengers #4 as a brainwashed minion of Krona.
- Baron Zebro, a funny animal-themed alternate universe version of Baron Zemo from Earth-8311, appears in Peter Porker, the Spectacular Spider-Ham #16.
- An original incarnation of Baron Zemo, which was Howard Stark brainwashed, appears in the Marvel Noir universe.

== In other media ==
=== Television ===
Baron Heinrich Zemo in The Avengers: Earth's Mightiest Heroes

- Baron Heinrich Zemo appears in the "Captain America" segment of The Marvel Super Heroes, voiced by Gillie Fenwick.
- Baron Heinrich Zemo makes a non-speaking appearance in The Avengers: United They Stand episode "Command Decision".
- Baron Heinrich Zemo, with elements of Helmut Zemo, appears in The Avengers: Earth's Mightiest Heroes, voiced by Robin Atkin Downes. This version is the original leader of Hydra during WWII who is infected and disfigured by "Virus X", a chemical weapon he developed to wipe out the Allies, in an encounter with Captain America. Zemo enhances his body and survives to the present day with the help of a formula created by Arnim Zola and, after escaping from S.H.I.E.L.D.'s Raft prison, resurfaces to resume his feud with Captain America upon learning that he has been revived by the Avengers. Zemo is later recruited by the Enchantress to lead the Masters of Evil against the Avengers, but Zemo betrays the Enchantress to seize control of her and Loki's army for himself, culminating in a civil war between the villains that ends with Zemo's incarceration in Prison 42.
- Baron Heinrich Zemo appears in Marvel Disk Wars: The Avengers, voiced by Taketora in the Japanese version and again by Robin Atkin Downes in the English dub. This version is a member of the Masters of Evil.
- Baron Heinrich Zemo appears in Avengers Assemble, voiced by David Kaye (in "Saving Captain Rogers" and "T'Chanda") and Danny Jacobs (in "The House of Zemo"). This version is one of the leaders of Hydra and the head of the Shadow Council who created a variant of the super-soldier serum.

=== Video games ===
Baron Heinrich Zemo appears in Captain America: Super Soldier, voiced by Steve Blum. While he does not physically appear, his voice is heard in collectable diary entries, which reveal his family's history and his alliance with the Red Skull to awaken the Sleeper beneath Castle Zemo.
