= Valeria Richards =

Character

- Valeria Richards as depicted in Fantastic Four (vol. 8) #32 (May 2025). Art by Joshua Cassara.

Publication information
- Publisher: Marvel Comics
- First appearance: Fantastic Four (vol. 3) #15 (March 1999)
- Created by: Chris Claremont (writer); Salvador Larroca (artist)

In-story information
- Alter ego: Valeria Meghan Richards (née von Doom)
- Place of origin: Manhattan, New York
- Team affiliations: Fantastic Four; Future Foundation
- Notable aliases: Brainstorm; Marvel Girl; Val
- Abilities: Genius-level intelligence Superhuman strength Invulnerability; Invisibility; Time travel Force field generation Energy blasts Limited telekinesis Telepathy

Valeria Meghan Richards, originally von Doom, is a character appearing in American comic books published by Marvel Comics. The character is the daughter of Mister Fantastic (Reed Richards) and the Invisible Woman (Susan Storm-Richards) and goddaughter of Doctor Victor von Doom. She is the younger sister of Franklin Richards. Valeria made her first appearance under the code name Marvel Girl and is currently using the name Brainstorm.

== Publication history ==
Valeria von Doom first appeared in Fantastic Four (vol. 3) #15 (March 1999), during writer Chris Claremont and artist Salvador Larroca's run. While Chris Claremont intended to resolve the storyline, he never got the chance, as Rafael Marín, Carlos Pacheco, and Jeph Loeb took over Fantastic Four and brought Valeria back into the title, changing the character's origins. In the comics themselves, Roma professed to have cared for the girl, but the Official Handbook of the Marvel Universe states that Valeria was raised in an alternate future as the daughter of Doctor Doom and Sue Storm.

== Fictional character biography ==
Valeria Richards is introduced as the daughter of Invisible Woman and Doctor Doom of an alternate universe. Valeria materializes in the Fantastic Four's headquarters, claiming to be from the future, and is accepted into the group after an initial period of conflict.

Valeria is later revealed to be the second, unborn child of Reed and Sue Richards, whom Sue had seemingly miscarried years before. Under the guidance of Roma, Franklin Richards used his powers to save Valeria, taking her from her native reality and sending her "someplace else". There, she was raised by Invisible Woman, who had married a now heroic Doctor Doom after the death of her first husband.

As the FF battle the cosmic menace of Abraxas, Valeria is summoned by Roma and helps reconstitute Galactus to stop Abraxas. In the restructuring of reality that ensues, Valeria regresses to an unborn fetus, which is later reborn. Unknown to the Fantastic Four, Doom places a spell on Valeria, making her his familiar.

In the Secret Wars: The Runaways crossover, Valeria is the headmistress of the Victor von Doom Institute for Gifted Youths in Latveria. After the conclusion of Secret Wars, Valeria leaves to explore the multiverse with Franklin, Reed, and Sue, returning at an older age similar to her original appearance.

After becoming Sorcerer Supreme, Doctor Doom takes over Earth and comes into conflict with Earth's heroes. During this battle, Doom detonates his armor, inadvertently killing Valeria. Doom makes a deal with the Living Tribunal to resurrect Valeria at the cost of his life.

== Powers and abilities ==
Valeria possesses no superhuman abilities, but possesses remarkable intelligence that she claims surpasses her father's. This enabled her to solve a Rubik's Cube at a young age and create advanced technology, such as an artificially intelligent toy and a special belt that recreates her mother's force fields. The device also allows her to neutralize her brother's powers and travel through time. Valeria also used an armored costume that mixed elements of the Fantastic Four's uniform and Doctor Doom's armor. She could summon the armor, apparently through the metallic paint of Doom's mask on her fingernails.

In Marvel Knights 4, Johnny Storm encounters an alternate timeline version of Valeria who developed Sue's invisibility.

== Reception ==
In 2021, CBR.com ranked Valeria Richards / Brainstorm 2nd in their "Marvel: 10 Smartest Female Characters" list.

== Other versions ==
=== What If...? ===
Two alternate universe versions of Valeria Richards appear in What If...? (vol. 2) #30.

- In the first version, taking place on Earth-91111, the child is born under the name Susan Richards II, but is revealed as an energy-draining monster which kills the Fantastic Four and Doctor Doom before Franklin banishes her to the Negative Zone.
- In the second version, taking place on Earth-91112, Susan and her baby, who is named Mary after her grandmother, survive the childbirth process. As she ages, Mary gains healing powers and becomes a political activist. By order of the incumbent President, who sees her as a threat, Henry Peter Gyrich attempts to assassinate Mary, but she survives and eventually becomes President.

=== Marvel Zombies ===
An alternate universe version of Valeria Richards appears in Marvel Zombies: Dead Days #1. She and Franklin are killed by a zombified She-Hulk, driving Reed insane and leading him to infect himself and the Fantastic Four.

=== Doctor Strange and the Sorcerers Supreme ===
An alternate universe version of Valeria Richards appears in Doctor Strange and the Sorcerers Supreme. This version became Doctor Doom and an enemy of Sorcerer Supreme Billy Kaplan.

=== Old Woman Laura ===
An alternate universe version of Valeria Richards appears in All-New Wolverine #33.

=== Aliens vs Avengers ===
A future 45 year old version of Valeria appears in Aliens vs Avengers, a crossover comics with the Alien franchise. She is the splitting image of her mother but with her father's intellect, has been divorced twice and is the goddaughter of the aging Bruce Bunner/Hulk. The latter retrieves her from a critical mission which Valeria explains she had carried out on her own with the purpose of bio-engineering a virus that can destroy xenomorph eggs. However, she has a dark secret: during the mission she had used a technological replication of her mother's invisibility powers, but had stumbled loudly in the dark, with the noise attracting facehuggers to her presence in spite of her invisibility, leading her to becoming impregnated with a xenomorph embryo, which finally erupts inside a sealed lab and kills her. Bruce Banner then turns into the Hulk and avenges his goddaughter by killing the spawned xenomorph waiting within the lab.

== In other media ==
- Valeria Richards appears in the Mad episode "Fantastic Four Christmases", voiced by Rachel Ramras.
- Valeria Richards makes a non-speaking cameo appearance in Marvel: Ultimate Alliance 2.
- Valeria Richards appears in Marvel's Wastelanders, voiced by Rebecca Naomi Jones.
