= Baron Strucker =

Marvel Comics fictional character

- Baron Strucker, as he appeared on the cover of Nick Fury, Agent of S.H.I.E.L.D. #34 (April 1992). Art by M.C. Wyman

Publication information
- Publisher: Marvel Comics
- First appearance: Sgt. Fury and his Howling Commandos #5 (January 1964)
- Created by: Stan Lee (writer); Jack Kirby (artist)

In-story information
- Alter ego: Wolfgang von Strucker
- Species: Human mutate
- Team affiliations: Hydra; Power Elite
- Partnerships: Baron Helmut Zemo
- Notable aliases: Supreme Hydra
- Abilities: Skilled military strategist and spy; Master of disguise; Excellent actor; Exceptional hand to hand combatant, marksman and swordsman; High-level intellect; Enhanced strength and energy projection via Satan Claw; Healing factor and limited invulnerability via Death Spore virus in his blood; Repressed aging

Baron Wolfgang von Strucker (/ˈstrʌkər/) is a supervillain appearing in American comic books published by Marvel Comics. A former Nazi officer, he is the founder and the supreme leader of the Hydra terrorist organization, and the archenemy of Nick Fury and S.H.I.E.L.D. He has also come into conflict with the Avengers, and the interests of the United States, and is thus a fugitive. He has been physically augmented to be nearly ageless. While Strucker has been seemingly killed in the past, he returned to plague the world with schemes of world domination and genocide, time and time again.

The character has appeared in several media adaptations, including television series and video games. Strucker was portrayed by Campbell Lane in the 1998 TV film, Nick Fury: Agent of S.H.I.E.L.D., by Thomas Kretschmann in the Marvel Cinematic Universe films Captain America: The Winter Soldier (2014) and Avengers: Age of Ultron (2015), and by Joey Defore as a teenager in the television series Agents of S.H.I.E.L.D., also set in the Marvel Cinematic Universe.

== Publication history ==
Created by Stan Lee and Jack Kirby, the character first appeared in Sgt. Fury and his Howling Commandos #5 (1964).

== Fictional character biography ==
Born in the late 19th century to a Prussian noble family who had relocated to Strucker Castle in Bavaria following the Franco-Prussian War, Wolfgang von Strucker became a Heidelberg fencing champion. When Adolf Hitler rose to power in Germany in 1933, Baron Strucker joined the Nazi Party, becoming infamous in the following years.

=== World War II ===
At the beginning of World War II, Strucker is appointed wing commander of the Death's Head Squadron by Hitler. While vacationing in Berlin, Strucker witnesses Thor's attack on the Reich Chancellery, after which Strucker followed a bandaged man through a portal in space. Realizing he had traveled decades into the future, Strucker steals history books about the end of World War II. Doctor Doom, creator of the time machine, allows Strucker to return to the past, not believing that he could win the war even with the knowledge he had obtained.

Tiring of Strucker's failures, Hitler assigns Strucker to topple a resistance in the French town of Cherbeaux, or else destroy the town. Strucker rounds up the resistance to send them to camps to avoid having to destroy the town, but the Howling Commandos derail his train, freeing the captives. Hitler demands that Strucker destroy the town, and Strucker sets the explosives, but then came face-to-face with Fury, who had rigged an explosive powerful enough to kill Strucker. Caught in a stalemate, Strucker agrees to let the people of Cherbeaux evacuate so that he and Fury can battle again. For his actions, Strucker is marked for death by the Gestapo.

Strucker escapes via the Red Skull, Hitler's right-hand man, who sends him to Japan. In Japan, Strucker joins forces with the Hand and an underground subversive movement which later became Hydra. Strucker kills the Supreme Hydra, claiming his title and becoming the head of Hydra.

Avoiding prosecution for war crimes, Strucker is given a serum to slow his age so he can personally oversee Hydra's progress for decades to come. He finally reveals himself as Hydra's leader when he prepared to unleash the Death Spore bomb from Hydra Island. Invading the island, Nick Fury tricks Strucker's men into shooting their leader. In a panic, Strucker runs into a chamber where nuclear processes were taking place and is killed.

=== Resurrection ===
Hydra suffered without Strucker's leadership, and the Red Skull championed an effort to bring the Baron back, providing a distraction to occupy Fury's newly-rebuilt S.H.I.E.L.D. while Hydra scientists find Strucker's body and sacrifice themselves to revive him with the Death Spore.

=== Thunderbolts ===
Gorgon stages a coup within Hydra and kills Strucker. This Strucker is subsequently revealed to be a clone, as the real Strucker was rescued and kept in stasis before being freed by Swordsman (who turns out to be his son Andreas) and Helmut Zemo. Strucker agrees to work with Zemo in his grand plan to take over the world and left together.

=== Dark Reign ===
During the "Dark Reign" storyline, Strucker's longtime nemesis, Nick Fury, discovers that S.H.I.E.L.D. is, and always has been, controlled by Hydra. Strucker calls forth Hydra's leaders (Kraken, Viper, Madame Hydra, and Hive), and resurrects Gorgon for the purpose of "letting the world become aware of Hydra's true nature". However, Fury is interfering in Strucker's plans, so Strucker enlists the help of Norman Osborn to take care of his nemesis.

Along with Nick Fury, Baron Strucker is captured by Kraken. It was revealed that not only was Kraken really Nick Fury's presumably dead half-brother Jake Fury, but that S.H.I.E.L.D. had been controlling Hydra all along. Nick Fury proceeds to shoot Strucker in the head.

=== All-New, All-Different Marvel ===
Strucker eventually emerges alive minus an eye and replaced with a prosthetic lens. He is described as no longer being Hydra's leader, though shown to still be heavily involved in international subversive dealings.

After the defeat of the Secret Empire, Strucker is given praise as a national hero for leading the defeat of multiple Hydra splinter groups. He also appears as a member of the Power Elite.

== Powers and abilities ==
Baron Strucker is a consummate military strategist and spy. Possessing peak human physical conditioning, he is a skilled hand-to-hand combatant, swordsman, and marksman. In addition to carrying a sword and traditional firearms, he wears the Satan Claw on his right hand, a metal gauntlet that amplifies his strength and discharges electrical shocks. Strucker also uses serums developed by Hydra to retard his aging process, allowing him to maintain his physical prime despite his advanced age.

Exposure to his Death Spore has bonded Strucker's DNA with the Death Spore, enabling him to be revived after seemingly being killed by gunshot wounds and radiation poisoning. Strucker can now release the Death Spore virus from his body at will, killing his victims nearly instantly. If Strucker is killed, the Death Spore viruses will allegedly be set free from his body and risk infecting the entire Earth.

== In other media ==
=== Television ===
- Baron Strucker appears in The Avengers: Earth's Mightiest Heroes, voiced by Jim Ward. This version's youth is derived from the Satan Claw, which he uses to absorb life energy from others to rejuvenate himself.
- Baron Strucker appears in The Super Hero Squad Show, voiced by Rob Paulsen.
- Baron Strucker appears in Lego Marvel Super Heroes: Avengers Reassembled, voiced by J. P. Karliak.
- Baron Strucker appears in Avengers Assemble, voiced by Robin Atkin Downes.

=== Film ===
Baron Strucker appears in Nick Fury: Agent of S.H.I.E.L.D., portrayed by Campbell Lane.

=== Marvel Cinematic Universe ===
Baron Strucker appears in media set in the Marvel Cinematic Universe (MCU):

- Strucker first appears in a mid-credits scene of the film Captain America: The Winter Soldier, portrayed by Thomas Kretschmann. Based in a Sokovian compound, he leads a Hydra cell in conducting experiments to create superhumans using Loki's scepter, which results in Wanda and Pietro Maximoff acquiring powers.
- Strucker returns in the film Avengers: Age of Ultron. After the Avengers discover and raid his compound, Strucker is defeated by Steve Rogers and transferred to NATO's custody. Following this, Ultron kills Strucker.
- A young Strucker appears in the TV series Agents of S.H.I.E.L.D. episode "Rise and Shine", portrayed by Joey Defore. In his youth, he was predetermined to lead Hydra and attended Hydra Academy.

=== Video games ===
- Baron Strucker appears as a boss in Captain America: Super Soldier, voiced by Kai Wulff.
- Baron Strucker appears as a boss in Marvel Avengers Alliance.
- The MCU incarnation of Baron Strucker appears as a playable character in Lego Marvel's Avengers.
- Baron Strucker appears as a boss in Marvel: Avengers Alliance 2.

=== Miscellaneous ===
Baron Strucker appears in The Avengers: United They Stand #2.
