= Citizen V =

Superheroes appearing in American comic books published by Marvel Comics

- Helmut Zemo as Citizen V. Art by Mark Bagley.

Publication information
- Publisher: Marvel Comics
- First appearance: Daring Mystery Comics (January 1942)
- Created by: Ben Thompson

In-story information
- Alter ego: John Watkins
- Species: Human
- Team affiliations: V-Battalion; Thunderbolts
- Abilities: Master hand-to-hand combatant, martial artist, swordsman, and marksman; Master tactician and strategist

Citizen V is the codename of several superheroes appearing in American comic books published by Marvel Comics. The first Citizen V, John Watkins, was introduced in 1942, during the Golden Age of Comic Books. The fourth Citizen V, Helmut Zemo, is a supervillain who assumed the Citizen V identity as a member of the Thunderbolts. In addition, various other characters have held the Citizen V name, including Sunspot and Valentina Allegra de Fontaine.

== Publication history ==
The original incarnation (John Watkins) first appeared in Daring Mystery Comics (Jan 1942), during the Golden Age of Comic Books. However, the identity was revived in the modern day via Thunderbolts.

The "V" in the character's and group's name is the letter "V" - as opposed to the Roman numeral 5 - and is derived from the World War II-era slogan "V for Victory".

== Fictional character biography ==
=== John Watkins ===
The original version of Citizen V was John Watkins, an Englishman who assisted the resistance in Nazi-occupied France. He led a group of freedom fighters called the V-Battalion. He had a relationship with Paulette Brazee, and assisted Captain America before he was killed in action by Baron Heinrich Zemo.

=== Paulette Brazee ===
The second version of Citizen V was Paulette Brazee (also known as the She-Wolf), the French lover of John Watkins and mother of JJ Watkins. During the war, she was a spy sent to romance Baron Zemo who she betrayed and eventually discovered she was pregnant. When John and the majority of the V-Battalion were slaughtered by Zemo, the remaining survivors had Brazee smuggled to England. There, Brazee met a red-headed soldier whom she married.

After the V-Battalion was reconstituted in 1951, Brazee was given the Citizen V role. The V-Battalion began hunting down Nazi war criminals. In 1953, Brazee was sent on a mission to Argentina to find Nazi scientist Johann Weimer and bring the scientist to the V-Battalion so they could use the Nazi's skills for them. However, Brazee was murdered by one of the Everlasting, a group of gods who had frequent run-ins with the V-Battalion.

=== John Watkins Jr. ===
The third version of Citizen V is John "JJ" Watkins Jr., the alleged son of John Watkins Sr. and Paulette Brazee. Since his father died before he was born and his mother was often away on missions as Citizen V during his childhood, JJ was primarily raised by nannies employed by the V-Battalion. In 1971, JJ asked the Shadow King for help in researching the Everlasting. JJ died when his own son was two years old.

=== John Watkins III ===
John Watkins III was raised to be a version of Citizen V. Following an incident in the V-Battalion, Watkins was left comatose for five years. He was revived after Helmut Zemo's mind was placed in his body. After Zemo left his body, Watkins remained as Citizen V.
