= Hydra (comics) =

Fictional terrorist organization in Marvel comics

- Symbol of Hydra

Publication information
- Publisher: Marvel Comics
- First appearance: Strange Tales #135 (August 1965)
- Created by: Stan Lee (writer); Jack Kirby (artist)

In-story information
- Base(s): Various
- Owner(s): Currently: Viper; Formerly: Baron Strucker; Red Skull (clone); Captain America (Hydra)
- Employee(s): Current members: Baron Helmut Zemo; Arnim Zola; Former members: Hardball; Gorgon; Kingpin; Silvermane; Werner von Strucker; Bob, Agent of Hydra

Hydra (sometimes stylized as HYDRA) is a fictional terrorist organization appearing in American comic books published by Marvel Comics. Its name alludes to the mythical Lernaean Hydra, as does its motto: "Cut off one head, two more shall take its place," proclaiming the group's resilience and growing strength in the face of resistance. Hydra is taken over and turned into a neo-fascist international crime syndicate by Baron Wolfgang von Strucker. Hydra agents often wear distinctive green garb featuring a serpent motif. Hydra's plans for world domination are regularly foiled by Marvel Universe superheroes and the intelligence organization S.H.I.E.L.D.

Hydra has appeared in various media adaptations, including films, television series, and video games. It plays a major role in the Marvel Cinematic Universe.

== Publication history ==
Hydra agents, as depicted on a panel of Hail Hydra #1 (July 2015). Art by Roland Boschi.

Hydra first appeared in Strange Tales #135 (August 1965). In its original continuity, it was headed by nondescript businessman Arnold Brown, who was killed when S.H.I.E.L.D. apparently crushed the organization. Hydra soon returned, however, headed by Baron Wolfgang von Strucker, with the support of the Nazi Red Skull; Hydra's changing origin is one of Marvel's earliest retcons. After its initial defeat, some of its branches, such as its scientific branch A.I.M. (Advanced Idea Mechanics) and the Secret Empire, became independent.

Crypt of Shadows #5, published in 1973, reprinted a story from Menace #10 (1954), but with a change to a line of dialogue that erroneously implied that Hydra premiered in a 1954 issue. In the reprint, an agent of an unspecified enemy government is changed to identify himself as working for Hydra when he paid off a scientist named Dr. Nostrum for information about a cobalt bomb that turned people into monsters. Nostrum shot all the other scientists on his team after they were turned into monsters, then shot himself after his son put an image from a monster magazine on his mirror.

== Fictional organization history ==
Hail, Hydra! Immortal Hydra! We shall never be destroyed! Cut off a limb and two more shall take its place! We serve none but the Master—as the world shall soon serve us! Hail Hydra!

— The Hydra oath from Strange Tales #135 (Aug. 1965)

The earliest origins of Hydra began in the Ancient Egypt when Imhotep led an army to defeat the Brood. Part of Imhotep's organization went eastward to become a secret society of geniuses called the Brotherhood of the Spear, based on Imhotep's spear, while the other half became the Brotherhood of the Shield, based on Imhotep's shield. Over time, the Brotherhood of the Spear spread into all facets of human society, from science to magic to politics. As time wore on, the organization's name changed and it included the Cathari sect, as well as the Thule Society. The Nazi sub-group, funded by the Thule Society, is brought into the main Hydra fold after the end of World War II.

One of the Nazi members, Baron Wolfgang von Strucker, seizes control of Hydra and restructures it to be dedicated to world domination through terrorist and subversive activities on various fronts, resulting in a global neo-fascist New World Order. To this end, Strucker uses his personal fortune, based on his recovered hoard of Nazi plunder from World War II, and funds established by the original leaders of the Japanese secret society that became part of the old Hydra. After Strucker's death, Hydra broke into factions (such as A.I.M., the Secret Empire, THEM, etc.) that each adopted its own reorganized modus operandi. Eventually, this fragmentation would lead to a Hydra civil war, even after Strucker's resurrection.

After the events of "Secret Invasion", Nick Fury discovered that S.H.I.E.L.D. is under the control of Hydra, and apparently had been from the beginning. He also discovered a number of organizations under Hydra's alleged control, including the United States' FBI Science and Technology Branch, the NSA, and the U.S. Department of the Treasury, along with the Russian Main Intelligence Directorate and Foreign Intelligence Service, and the Canadian Security Intelligence Service.

Hardball, empowered by the Power Broker, is appointed as a double agent, acting both as an Initiative recruit and as a Hydra spy, with the role of gathering information about the Initiative and doing errands for Hydra in exchange for secrecy and the expensive health care needed by his brother, a former UCWF wrestler, who is crippled in the ring. Hardball, however, deeply hurt and shamed by the compromises Congressman Woodman forced him to endure and Komodo's attempt to bail him out of Hydra by telling his secrets to Gravity, kills Woodman in front of his subordinates. Hardball is appointed as the new Supreme Leader of Hydra. Hardball later surrenders and is imprisoned in the Negative Zone prison.

In the aftermath of the Secret Invasion and Strucker's second death, there followed a series of power struggles, which eventually leaves Hydra without a formal leader. The Red Skull, returning to his Nazi beliefs, starts building a new Hydra from the ground up. However, this brings him into conflict with Baron Zemo, who is attempting to control what remains of the old Hydra.

After the existence of Pleasant Hill, a top-secret community where Maria Hill incarcerated various supervillains (after brainwashing them to believe they were regular civilians via the Cosmic Cube Kobik), is exposed and subsequently shut down, the Red Skull's clone uses the subsequent backlash in the intelligence community to assemble a new version of Hydra. Although his efforts are still focused on rebuilding the organization, he had already scored a significant victory, after Kobik alters Steve Rogers' memories to make him believe that he has been a Hydra sleeper agent since childhood.

The storyline "Secret Empire" follows Rogers and Hydra as they take control of the United States, imprisoning mutants and Inhumans. Sam Wilson brings hope to the resistance with a plan to bring the real Captain America back by using the remaining Cosmic Cube. Kobik returns the real Captain America with his memories intact, though his Hydra counterpart remains as a separate being.

== Other versions ==
=== Amalgam Comics ===
An alternate universe iteration of Hydra appears in the Amalgam Comics series Super-Soldier, led by Lex Luthor / Green Skull.

=== Exiles ===
An alternate universe iteration of Hydra appears in Exiles #91-94, led by Sue Storm / Madame Hydra and Wolverine and consisting of Captain Hydra and Slaymaster.

=== Secret Wars (2015) ===
Two alternate universe iterations of Hydra from Battleworld appear during the "Secret Wars" storyline:

- The first iteration appears in the tie-in Hail Hydra, consisting of Arnim Zola, Grant Ward, Dum Dum Dugan, Nick Fury Jr., and Toad as well as Viper symbiotes. This version of the organization originates from the Battleworld domain of the Hydra Empire.
- The second iteration appears in the tie-in Hank Johnson: Agent of Hydra, consisting of Arnim Zola, Baron Strucker, Baron Heinrich Zemo, Hank Johnson, MODOK, Red Skull, and Viper. This version of the organization hail from the Battleworld domain of the Walled City of New York.

=== Ultimate Marvel ===
An alternate universe iteration of Hydra appears in the Ultimate Marvel imprint, consisting of Viper, Modi, Commander Crimson, and Abigail Brand. This version of the organization operates on a vague "anti-government" stance.

== In other media ==
=== Television ===
- Hydra appears in The Incredible Hulk episode "Enter: She-Hulk".
- Hydra appears in the X-Men: Evolution, led by Viper as the Supreme Hydra while Omega Red and Gauntlet appear as mercenaries aligned with them. This version of the organization created X-23 from Wolverine's DNA.
- Hydra appears in The Avengers: Earth's Mightiest Heroes. This version was originally led by Baron Heinrich Zemo during World War II, with the Red Skull acting as the group's field commander and Baron Strucker serving as the Skull's lieutenant. In the present day, Zemo and the Red Skull each strike off from Hydra, allowing Strucker to take over as leader with the Grim Reaper and Viper serving as his lieutenants.
- Hydra appears in Avengers Assemble, consisting of the Red Skull, Baron Strucker, Crossbones, the Crimson Widow, and Arnim Zola.
- Hydra appears in Ultimate Spider-Man, consisting of Arnim Zola, Crossbones, Baron Mordo, and Dr. Michael Morbius. This version of the organization backed Doctor Octopus's formation of a new iteration of the Sinister Six and created the Carnage symbiote and the Spider-Slayers.
- Hydra appears in Marvel Future Avengers, consisting of the Red Skull, Arnim Zola, and General Brushov. This version of the organization works in collaboration with Kang the Conqueror and the Masters of Evil and have kidnapped and genetically manipulated several children to turn them into loyal super-soldiers who believe the Avengers are villains. Three of the children, Makoto, Adi, and Chloe discover the truth and defect to the Avengers, while a fourth named Bruno is recruited by the Masters of Evil before later defecting as well.
- Hydra appears in the Spider-Man episode "Spider-Island", consisting of Arnim Zola and Crossbones.

=== Film ===
- Hydra appears in Nick Fury: Agent of S.H.I.E.L.D.
- Hydra appears in Ultimate Avengers 2.
- Hydra appears in Heroes United: Iron Man and Hulk, consisting of Dr. Cruler and Dr. Fump.
- Hydra appears in Heroes United: Iron Man & Captain America.

=== Video games ===
- Hydra appears in X-Men: The Official Game, led by Silver Samurai. This version of the group worked in collaboration with William Stryker Jr. to create Master Mold and the Sentinels.
- Hydra appears in Spider-Man: Web of Fire.
- A Hydra aerial base appears in Marvel vs. Capcom 3: Fate of Two Worlds via the S.H.I.E.L.D. stage.
- Hydra appears in Captain America: Super Soldier, led by the Red Skull and consisting of Baron Strucker, Arnim Zola, Madame Hydra, and Iron Cross.
- Hydra appears in Marvel: Avengers Alliance, consisting of Baron Helmut Zemo, Moonstone, Viper, and the Hydra Four.
- Hydra appears in Avengers Initiative.
- Hydra appears in Marvel Heroes.
- Hydra agents appear in Lego Marvel Super Heroes, consisting of the Red Skull, Arnim Zola, and an unnamed Hydra Agent.
- Hydra agents appear in Lego Marvel's Avengers, consisting of Baron Strucker, the Red Skull, Dr. List, Viper, Crossbones, and Arnim Zola.
- Hydra appears in Lego Marvel Super Heroes 2, consisting of the Red Skull, Baron Helmut Zemo, Arnim Zola, Captain America / Hydra Supreme, and the Hydra Four.

=== Miscellaneous ===
Hydra appears in Marvel Universe: LIVE!.

== See also ==
- SS-Totenkopfverbände – A real-life organization in Nazi Germany responsible for running concentration camps and death camps. This group also used a skull in its insignia.
