= Marvel's Wastelanders =

Podcast series

- Genre: Superhero fiction
- Language: English

Cast and voices
- Starring: Timothy Busfield; Stephen Lang; Susan Sarandon; Robert Patrick; Dylan Baker

Production
- Production: Marvel New Media; SiriusXM

Publication
- No. of episodes: 60
- Original release: 2021 – 2023

Related
- Website: www.marvel.com/digital-series/podcasts/marvels-wastelanders-old-man-star-lord

Marvel's Wastelanders is an interconnected series of six radio drama podcasts produced by Marvel New Media and SiriusXM in association with Wave Runner Studios and launched in June 2021. The series' podcasts are set in a variation of the Old Man Logan universe, a future timeline where the world's supervillains, led by Doctor Doom, Red Skull, and Baron Zemo, teamed up to kill almost all superheroes and establish a new world order. Those heroes who survived — including Wolverine, Hawkeye, and Black Widow — are largely in hiding or broken shells of their former selves. A series of events, beginning with the return to Earth of Star-Lord and Rocket Raccoon on a mission for The Collector, leads to a final assembling of heroes for one last mission.

The series was originally announced in May 2021 as four, 10-episode podcasts featuring separatedly on Star-Lord, Hawkeye, Black Widow, and Wolverine, along with a fifth team-up series. The first series, Marvel's Wastelanders: Old Man Star-Lord, launched in June 2021.

Originally, the series were to be styled as Old Man Star-Lord, Old Man Hawkeye, Old Man Wolverine, and Grey Widow, but in September 2021, in announcing the launch of Marvel's Wastelanders: Hawkeye, the "Old Man" styling was dropped. At the same time, an additional solo title in the series, Marvel's Wastelander's: Doom, was announced. Episodes were released first to Apple Podcasts subscribers with a general release a week later. In the credits of the final episode of Wastelanders: Doom, the team-up series featuring Star-Lord, Hawkeye, Black Widow, and Wolverine, as well as Doom, was teased with the final series in the Wastelanders "audio epic" launching in December 2022.

The series of podcasts have been noted for their writing and voice acting, as well as the well-known stars associated with the project, including series leads Timothy Busfield as Star-Lord, Stephen Lang as Hawkeye, Susan Sarandon as Black Widow, Robert Patrick as Wolverine, and Dylan Baker as Doom.

== Series installments ==
Title	Seasons	Episodes	Original airing	Director	Writer	Sound Design	Production company	Ref.
Marvel's Wastelanders: Star-Lord (Note: Originally released as Marvel's Wastelanders: Old Man Star-Lord.)	1	10	2021	Kimberly Senior	Benjamin Percy	Mark Henry Phillips	Marvel New Media/SiriusXM	
Marvel's Wastelanders: Hawkeye	1	10	2021	Rachel Chavkin	J. Holtham	One Thousand Birds	Marvel New Media/SiriusXM	
Marvel's Wastelanders: Black Widow	1	10	2022	Timothy Busfield	Alex Delyle	Daniel Brunelle	Marvel New Media/SiriusXM	
Marvel's Wastelanders: Wolverine	1	10	2022	Jenny Turner Hall	Jenny Turner Hall	Michael Odmark	Marvel New Media/SiriusXM	
Marvel's Wastelanders: Doom	1	10	2022	Jade King Carroll	Mark Waid and James Tae Kim	Mark Henry Phillips	Marvel New Media/SiriusXM	
Marvel's Wastelanders	1	10	2022–2023	Kimberly Senior	Nick Bernardone, J. Holtham and Mark Waid	One Thousand Birds	Marvel New Media/SiriusXM	

== Star-Lord ==
Star-Lord and Rocket Raccoon crash land in the American Midwest, a barren wasteland controlled by Doctor Doom, where they must find for The Collector an ancient cosmic relic, the Black Vortex. However, they soon encounter a number of challenges, including Kraven the Hunter, outlaw Ghost Riders, and Emma Frost. When released, the series was titled Marvel's Wastelanders: Old Man Star-Lord, but with the release of Marvel's Wastelanders: Hawkeye, it was retitled without the "Old Man" moniker.

=== Voice cast ===
The following do voice work in this podcast:

- Timothy Busfield as Peter Quill/Star-Lord
- Chris Elliott as Rocket Raccoon
- Patrick Page as Kraven the Hunter
- Vanessa Williams as Emma Frost
- Danny Glover as Red Crotter
- Nadine Malouf as Cora, Rigellian Recorder 3B02
- Dylan Baker as Doom and as Doombot
- Quincy Tyler Bernstine as The Collector
- Aasif Mandvi as Rattlesnake Pete
- Aime Donna Kelly as Francine
- Eric T. Miller as Brandon Best
- Michael Laurence as Sebastian Warn
- Elizabeth Francis as Joanna Forge
- Blake Morris as Hulk

=== Episodes ===
No.	Title	Original air date	Synopsis
1	"Chapter 1: Record of a Fallen World"	June 1, 2021	
2	"Chapter 2: The Wastelands"	June 1, 2021	
3	"Chapter 3: Blood Farmer"	June 8, 2021	
4	"Chapter 4: Deer on a Spear"	June 15, 2021	
5	"Chapter 5: Heaven and Hellfire"	June 22, 2021	
6	"Chapter 6: Trust Exercise"	June 29, 2021	
7	"Chapter 7: Catching Fire"	July 6, 2021	
8	"Chapter 8: Buried"	July 13, 2021	
9	"Chapter 9: Kraven's Hunt"	July 20, 2021	
10	"Chapter 10: Dawn and Doom"	July 27, 2021	

== Hawkeye ==
30 years after Baron Zemo, the Thunderbolts, and the other villains killed the Avengers and rid the world of heroes, a blind and broken Hawkeye relives the final battle nightly as part of the Brotherhood Traveling Circus, Carnival and Ringmaster's Road Show. When his 17-year-old daughter, Ash, shows up seeking his help avenging the death of her best friend, Hawkeye's own efforts to avenge his lost friends are complicated. For Rachel Chavkin, Hawkeye is the first podcast she has directed.

=== Voice cast ===
The following do voice work in this podcast:

- Stephen Lang as Clint Barton/Hawkeye
- Sasha Lane as Natasha "Ash" Morse/King Zemo III
- Jess Barbagallo as Max
- Michelle Hurd as Bobbi Morse/Mockingbird
- Bobby Moreno as Fred Dukes Jr.
- Joe Morton as Ringmaster
- Tracie Thoms as Kate Bishop/Hawkeye
- Lea DeLaria as Raven/Mystique
- Shuler Hensley as Pyro
- Ron Canada as Abner Jenkins/Beetle
- Reiko Aylesworth as Destiny
- Jim Conroy as Fred Dukes Sr./Blob
- Kristin C as Karla Sofen/Moonstone
- James Saito as King Zemo

=== Episodes ===
No.	Title	Original air date	Synopsis
1	"Chapter 1: Star Attraction"	October 4, 2021	
2	"Chapter 2: Cards Up"	October 5, 2021	
3	"Chapter 3: School's Out"	October 11, 2021	
4	"Chapter 4: Trick Shot"	October 18, 2021	
5	"Chapter 5: Leap of Faith"	October 25, 2021	
6	"Chapter 6: Straight to the Heart"	November 1, 2021	
7	"Chapter 7: Two Graves"	November 8, 2021	
8	"Chapter 8: Shot in the Back"	November 15, 2021	
9	"Chapter 9: Bullseye"	November 22, 2021	
10	"Chapter 10: Justice is Blind"	November 29, 2021	

== Black Widow ==
Originally announced as Marvel's Wastelanders: Grey Widow. The mysterious Helen Black moves into a New York City apartment building owned and monitored by S.H.I.E.L.D.

=== Voice cast ===
The following do voice work in this podcast:

- Susan Sarandon as Natasha Romanova/Black Widow/"Helen Black"
- Eva Amurri as Yelena Belova/Black Widow/"Samantha Sugarman"
- Michael Boxleitner as Marco Marmarato
- Nate Corddry as Jordan Temple
- Amber Gray as Judy Stark/"Judy Kratz"
- Melissa Gilbert as K.I.M.
- Chasten Harmon as Lisa Cartwright
- Michael Imperioli as Stanley Petronella
- Justin Kirk as Hank Hammond
- Alan Muraoka as Dr. Brian Mizuno
- Will Janowitz as Crispin Burge
- Morgan Fairchild as Tappy Burge
- David Cale as J.A.R.V.I.S.

=== Episodes ===
No.	Title	Original air date	Synopsis
1	"Chapter 1: Houston, We Have a Spider"	January 5, 2022	
2	"Chapter 2: You See More"	January 5, 2022	
3	"Chapter 3: Subtext"	January 17, 2022	
4	"Chapter 4: By the Way"	January 24, 2022	
5	"Chapter 5: I Thought About Letting Her Know"	January 31, 2022	
6	"Chapter 6: A Very Melancholy Answer"	February 7, 2022	
7	"Chapter 7: Temet Nosce"	February 14, 2022	
8	"Chapter 8: Bonus"	February 21, 2022	
9	"Chapter 9: The Entertainment"	February 28, 2022	
10	"Chapter 10: The Future is Mysterious"	March 7, 2022	

== Wolverine ==
Since the villains took over, Wolverine has wandered in a daze of survivor's guilt and self-loathing, but now he must help a young mutant in hiding reach safety. Jenny Turner Hall was originally hired just to direct Wolverine, but as the project got started her role expanded to being both writer and director for the series.

=== Voice cast ===
The following do voice work in this podcast:

- Robert Patrick as Wolverine
- Ashlie Atkinson as Kitty Pryde
- Rachel Crowl as Red Skull
- Isabella Ferreira as Sofia
- Jennifer Ikeda as Rachel Summers
- Justin H. Min as Justin
- Carl Tart as Kevin
- Clarke Peters as Professor X
- Daniel Sunjata as Cyclops
- Charlie Pollock as Billy
- Cherise Booth as Jean Grey
- Jere Burns as Crossbones
- Luther Creek as Sabretooth
- Craig Bierko as Captain America
- Michael Perilstein as Bucky Barnes
- Joel de la Fuente as Ogun

=== Episodes ===
No.	Title	Original air date	Synopsis
1	"Chapter 1: Professor Logan"	June 12, 2022	
2	"Chapter 2: Back to One"	June 12, 2022	
3	"Chapter 3: On My Own"	June 20, 2022	
4	"Chapter 4: Inakzeptabel"	June 27, 2022	
5	"Chapter 5: Trust Me"	July 4, 2022	
6	"Chapter 6: Land of the Free"	July 11, 2022	
7	"Chapter 7: Shock and Awe"	July 18, 2022	
8	"Chapter 8: The Other Side"	July 25, 2022	
9	"Chapter 9: Awfully Sentimental"	August 1, 2022	
10	"Chapter 10: All That You Leave Behind"	August 8, 2022	

== Doom ==
After being betrayed by the other villains on V-Day, Doom is free and has teamed up with Valeria Richards to seek revenge. The story immediately follows the end of Marvel's Wastelanders: Star-Lord.

=== Voice cast ===
The following do voice work in this podcast:

- Dylan Baker as Doom
- Danny Burstein as Hulk
- Keith David as Kingpin
- John Hawkes as Klaw
- Kristen Johnston as She-Hulk
- Elijah Jones as Johnny Claymore
- Rebecca Naomi Jones as Valeria Richards
- Hamish Linklater as Sandman
- Nadine Malouf as Cora, Rigellian Recorder 3B02
- Luke Kirby as Maximus the Mad
- Larry Yando as Mad Thinker
- Eric T. Miller as Brandon Best
- Steven Rishard as Doc Samson
- David Shih as Amadeus Cho

=== Episodes ===
No.	Title	Original air date	Synopsis
1	"Chapter 1: A Superhero Walks into a Bar"	September 12, 2022	
2	"Chapter 2: A Fantastic Four"	September 12, 2022	
3	"Chapter 3: Mask-less"	September 19, 2022	
4	"Chapter 4: Destructive Interference"	September 26, 2022	
5	"Chapter 5: Truth Serum"	October 3, 2022	
6	"Chapter 6: Thunder Sandstorm"	October 10, 2022	
7	"Chapter 7: King of the Negative Zone"	October 17, 2022	
8	"Chapter 8: Tee Off"	October 24, 2022	
9	"Chapter 9: Getting Angry"	October 31, 2022	
10	"Chapter 10: I Am a God"	November 7, 2022	

== Wastelanders ==
With the Wastelands in a state of chaos following President Red Skull's death, Hawkeye, Star-Lord, Black Widow, Wolverine, and Doom team up to stop Valeria Richards who now has the power of the Cosmic Cube.

=== Voice cast ===
The following do voice work in this podcast:

- Dylan Baker as Doom
- Timothy Busfield as Peter Quill/Star-Lord
- Stephen Lang as Clint Barton/Hawkeye
- Robert Patrick as Wolverine
- Susan Sarandon as Natasha Romanova/Black Widow
- Eva Amurri as Yelena Belova/Black Widow
- Craig Bierko as Captain America
- Cherise Boothe as Jean Grey
- Amber Gray as Judy Stark
- Daniel Jenkins as Super-Adaptoid
- Rebecca Naomi Jones as Valeria Richards
- Nadine Malouf as Cora, Rigellian Recorder 3B02
- Danny McCarthy as Iron Man
- James Vincent Meredith as Reed Richards/Mister Fantastic
- Jaden Michael as Franklin Richards
- Jeff Perry as Narrator
- Clarke Peters as Professor X
- James Saito as King Zemo
- Tracie Thoms as Kate Bishop/Hawkeye
- Larry Yando as Mad Thinker
- Thom Sesma as Lieutenant Hoffman
- Liz Sharpe as Private Jones
- Mary Hollis Inboden as Zelda
- Ramiz Monsef as Magneto
- David Cale as J.A.R.V.I.S.
- Gabe Ruiz as Human Torch
- Thom Sesma as The Thing
- Gina Daniels as Invisible Woman
- Richey Nash as Wrecker
- Ramiz Monsef as Groot
- Chris Elliott as Rocket Raccoon
- Joe Morton as Ringmaster
- Melissa Gilbert as Elevator Voice

=== Episodes ===
No.	Title	Original air date	Synopsis
1	"Chapter 1: Marching Towards the End of the World"	December 5, 2022	
2	"Chapter 2: Road to Nowhere"	December 5, 2022	
3	"Chapter 3: Heroes of Old"	December 12, 2022	
4	"Chapter 4: Marvels"	December 19, 2022	
5	"Chapter 5: The Old Familiar Places"	December 26, 2022	
6	"Chapter 6: Assembled"	January 2, 2023	
7	"Chapter 7: Fractured"	January 9, 2023	
8	"Chapter 8: Shattered"	January 16, 2023	
9	"Chapter 9: Crossfire"	January 23, 2023	
10	"Chapter 10: Ultimate Power"	January 30, 2023	

== Production ==
Marvel's Wastelanders: Star-Lord is the first scripted joint production from Marvel New Media and SiriusXM, and was described by Marvel New Media executive Stephen Wacker as "the tip of the iceberg" for the new Marvel Audio Universe. The Wastelanders podcasting project was originally planned to launch in 2020 as part of a new agreement with SiriusXM and its Pandora streaming service; however, in July 2020, SiriusXM acquired Marvel's previous scripted podcasting partner, Stitcher, in July 2020 in an effort to bolster its portfolio of podcasts. Stitcher and Marvel previously produced two seasons of the Wolverine podcast along with a Marvels podcast. Author Benjamin Percy, who scripted the Wolverine: The Long Night and Wolverine: The Lost Trail podcasts, was brought on board to script Wastelanders: Star-Lord.

== Beyond the Scenes ==
Starting with Marvel's Wastelanders: Hawkeye, additional behind-the-scenes bonus episodes featuring conversations with each podcast's actors and creative teams were released via the Apple Podcasts subscription service. Dubbed Beyond the Scenes, the episodes are hosted by Tamara Krinsky.

Series	Guests	Original air date	Ref.
Hawkeye	Stephen Lang & Tracie Thoms	November 22, 2021	
Hawkeye	Rachel Chavkin & J. Holtham	December 13, 2021	
Black Widow	Timothy Busfield & Nate Corddry	February 7, 2022	
Black Widow	Melissa Gilbert, Justin Kirk, & Michael Boxleitner	March 14, 2022	
Wolverine	Jenny Turner Hall & Robert Patrick	June 13, 2022	
Wolverine	Rachel Crowl & Ashlie Atkinson	July 11, 2022	
Doom	Dylan Baker & Rebecca Naomi Jones	September 12, 2022	
Doom	Mark Waid, James Tae Kim, & Jade King Carroll	October 10, 2022	
Wastelanders	Kimberly Senior & Timothy Busfield	December 5, 2022	
Wastelanders	Jenny Radelet Mast & Jackie! Zho	December 26, 2022	

== Reception ==
Marvel's Wastelanders: Star-Lord has been praised for its casting and writing. Mike Mack at Laughing Place called Busfield and Elliott's chemistry as Quill and Rocket "hilarious," but noted that Malouf as Cora "steals the show" by providing both explanations and comedy. Taylor Bauer at Comic Years credits Percy's experience with both Marvel Comics and writing audio dramas for successfully setting up the world of Marvel's Wastelanders in the first episode without making it feel like a "detail dump."

Writing in The Guardian, Graeme Virtue lauded Marvel for attracting "top-notch acting talent and developing its superhero canon into such interesting new formats." He noted that for Wastelanders: Hawkeye and Wolverine, "Their chief aural pleasures come from the lead performances, with Avatar baddie Stephen Lang performing every hard-luck Hawkeye line as if he is auditioning for Deadwood. Terminator 2's Robert Patrick gives Hugh Jackman a run for his money as an even more grizzled Wolverine." And he described Wastelanders: Black Widow as the "standout story," noting "why Black Widow wants to infiltrate this place is the central mystery but it fires up the surveillance department, sparking a witty workplace conflict that feels more like Office Space than Avengers: Infinity War."
