= Helmut Zemo =

Marvel Comics fictional character

Helmut J. Zemo Baron Zemo
- Helmut Zemo as depicted on the textless variant cover of Secret Empire #4 (June 2017). Art by Dan Mora and Edgar Delgado.

Publication information
- Publisher: Marvel Comics
- First appearance: As Phoenix: Captain America #168 (December 1973); As Baron Zemo: Cameo appearance: Captain America #275 (November 1982); Full appearance: Captain America #276 (December 1982); As Citizen V: The Incredible Hulk vol. 2 #449 (January 1997)
- Created by: Roy Thomas; Jenny Blake Isabella; Sal Buscema

In-story information
- Alter ego: Baron Helmut J. Zemo
- Species: Human
- Team affiliations: Commission on Superhuman Activities; Thunderbolts; Masters of Evil; Secret Empire; Hydra
- Notable aliases: Baron Zemo; Citizen V Phoenix; Iron Cross; Mark Evanier
- Abilities: Genius-level intellect; Slowed aging; Master hand-to-hand combatant, martial artist, swordsman, and marksman; Master tactician and strategist

Helmut Zemo is a character appearing in American comic books published by Marvel Comics. Created by Roy Thomas, Jenny Blake Isabella and Sal Buscema, the character first appeared in Captain America #168 (December 1973). Helmut Zemo is the son of Baron Heinrich Zemo and the thirteenth Baron Zemo in his family lineage. He is a recurring adversary of the Avengers, especially the superhero Steve Rogers / Captain America. The character has also been known as Citizen V at various points in his history.

Daniel Brühl portrays the character in the Marvel Cinematic Universe, appearing in the film Captain America: Civil War (2016) and the Disney+ series The Falcon and the Winter Soldier (2021).

== Fictional character biography ==
Helmut Zemo (the 13th Baron Zemo) is Heinrich Zemo's son, born in Leipzig, Germany. Helmut was originally an engineer until he became enraged when reading a report about the return of Captain America and his father's death. Helmut would ultimately follow in his father's footsteps, using his family's money and his own scientific know-how to recreate his father's work.

Helmut first appears under the alias of the Phoenix, and captures Captain America to get revenge upon him for the death of his father. He is presumed dead after falling into a vat of Adhesive X, an adhesive created by Heinrich. Helmut's face is scarred by Adhesive X, giving his face the appearance of molten wax.

Helmut's original Baron Zemo costume

Zemo forms a new incarnation of the Masters of Evil formed to strike at Captain America through the Avengers. The group invades and occupies Avengers Mansion and crippled Hercules and the Avengers' butler Edwin Jarvis. Zemo captures Captain America and the Black Knight. Zemo battled Captain America, but fell off the mansion roof.

Zemo hires Batroc the Leaper's Brigade and psychic detective Tristram Micawber to help him locate the five fragments of the Bloodstone in hopes of restoring his father to life. Fighting Captain America and Diamondback, Zemo's plan backfires, as he instead turns his father's corpse into a vessel for the demonic forces residing in the Bloodstone. The reanimated corpse is destroyed by Crossbones, and a distraught Zemo falls down an inactive volcano in Japan trying to retrieve it. Zemo survives the fall, though his right hand is severely burned.

Broken and beaten, Zemo is taken in by a scientist called the Baroness, who models herself after Heinrich Zemo. The two marry and began kidnapping abused, neglected children to serve as their children. Zemo's sanity returns and he creates a new mask to hide his disfigured face from his adopted children, whom he nurtures and swears to protect from being returned to their abusive foster homes. The couple's peaceful life is shattered when Captain America discovered their home, while searching for Superia. Zemo turns on the Baroness and Superia before turning his attention to dropping Captain America into a vat of Adhesive X. The plan fails and Zemo and the Baroness fall into the vat instead. The two were rescued by Captain America and Helmut bemoaned that like his father, his face now was permanently hidden by his mask. Captain America reveals that the Avengers had since found a way to dissolve Adhesive X and would use it on him.

Helmut Zemo as Citizen V. Art by Mark Bagley.

Zemo escapes prison, though the Baroness dies shortly after being sentenced to prison for her role in the abduction of the children they were raising. During this time, Zemo discovers that Goliath is imprisoned in the Microverse and forms a new version of Masters of Evil to free Goliath. But after rescuing Goliath, the Avengers and the Fantastic Four disappeared during the Onslaught crisis and were presumed dead. After overhearing Beetle and Goliath talk about who would replace the Avengers and the Fantastic Four, a distraught Zemo soon found a new purpose for his team: the Masters of Evil would take on new heroic identities as the Thunderbolts. Zemo would lead the group under the alias Citizen V and planned to have the Thunderbolts gain the world's trust in order to conquer it. The public took a liking to the team much more quickly than Zemo, or any of the other Thunderbolts, expected and soon most of them came to like the feeling of being heroes.

When the missing heroes return, Zemo has the Thunderbolts' true identities leaked, forcing them to flee with him into deep space to assist his plan to conquer the world through mind control. However, most of the Thunderbolts rebel and foil Zemo's plan. Zemo goes into hiding and plots revenge on his former teammates, who are now trying to win back the public's trust by being real heroes.

After another of Zemo's plans is foiled by Captain America and a new Citizen V (Dallas Riordan), Zemo is killed by the new Scourge of the Underworld. His mind ends up being transferred into the comatose body of John Watkins III. Now in possession of Watkins' body, Zemo retakes the Citizen V mantle, this time as a member of the V-Battalion. Zemo's mind is later transferred into the body of Iron Cross, his Counter-Earth counterpart.

In the series Avengers/Thunderbolts, Zemo attempts to take over Earth again — this time with the belief that he could save the world by taking it over. Zemo now seems to be motivated by a twisted altruism rather than his original selfish desires; he feels he has grown beyond his father in that regard. However, the Avengers foil Zemo's scheme. He goes into hiding after taking Moonstone's twin alien gems.

Following the Civil War storyline, Iron Man asks Zemo to begin recruiting villains to his cause, which Zemo had already been doing, unknown to Iron Man. However, he meets up with Captain America and informed him that he really had reformed. He shows Captain America his face, once again scarred, to remind him of his earlier sacrifice, and gives him a key that would allow him to escape from the super-human prison being constructed. He also gives Captain America all his old mementos, destroyed by Zemo, which he had gone back in time and recovered.

Zemo now believes his father's Nazi ideals to be untrue, and that the only way to become superior is through righteousness. After helping Captain America, he remarks that Heinrich Zemo would be displeased with his current actions. Zemo reveals that Songbird was going to betray him and he was going to sacrifice himself in their upcoming battle with the Squadron Sinister. He told her that he would not die, but that he would become superior through his sacrifice "by living forever".

Zemo saves the Wellspring of Power from the Grandmaster, planning to use it for his own ends. Believing that all of his visions are subject to the flow of time, and that nothing was set in stone, Zemo defeats the Grandmaster. He insists that he will use his power to help the world, despite the consequences of doing so. Songbird betrays Zemo and cracks his moonstones, sending him backwards in time.

The limited series Thunderbolts Presents: Zemo - Born Better (2007) explores the history of the Zemo family. Helmut, sucked into the vacuum, wakes up in medieval Germany (1503), witnessing Harbin Zemo's death and his succession, while in the present academic Wendell Volker and Reed Richards deduce that Helmut has traveled in time. Captured and taken prisoner as a leper, Helmut manages to inspire Harbin's twelve-year-old grandson Heller Zemo to kill his own father Hademar Zemo and become Baron Zemo. After battling his own father in the past, giving him the inspiration to take up the Zemo mantle, Helmut returns to the present and manages to convince Wendell not to kill him as well, instead taking what is discovered to be his cousin under his wing, as he sets out to do something new for the world.

Having spent his time on the sidelines, watching Norman Osborn's rise to power with the intent of waiting to see what Osborn would do with control over the Thunderbolts and later S.H.I.E.L.D., Zemo reappears following the events of the "Siege" storyline. A chance encounter at the Thunderbolts' former base in Colorado with Ghost leads to Zemo learning that Bucky Barnes has become Captain America.

Zemo recruits Jurgen Hauptmann, Fixer, and Beetle (Janice Lincoln), to expose the current Captain America's sins to the world. This includes drugging Bucky Barnes with nanites that cause Captain America to behave irrationally and attack police officers and leaking to the media, not only detailed files revealing Winter Soldier's actions. Zemo ultimately kidnaps Barnes and takes him to Heinrich's island, where Barnes had nearly died. There Zemo confesses that he did what he did, not out of a desire to finish the job his father started, but out of jealousy over how Captain America and his allies quickly forgave Barnes for his crimes, yet continue to scorn the reformed Helmut who had saved the world on numerous occasions. Zemo forces Bucky into a deathtrap, which he has modified to allow Barnes a chance to escape.

In Avengers Undercover, Zemo becomes the leader of the Shadow Council's Masters of Evil following the death of Max Fury.

Zemo becomes the new leader of Hydra and enters into conflict with Sam Wilson, the new Captain America. Using the toxic blood of an Inhuman boy named Lucas, Zemo plans to sterilize the human race and distribute a cure to only a small portion of those infected, thus forcibly solving the planet's problems with overpopulation and lack of resources.

During the Avengers: Standoff! storyline, Zemo appears as a prisoner of the S.H.I.E.L.D. gated community of Pleasant Hill under the identity of Jim after Kobik erases his memories. Phil, a fellow inmate, builds a device to restore his memories and uses it on himself and Jim to restore their true selves. Jim is restored to Zemo while Phil is revealed to have been a transformed Fixer. Zemo and Fixer restore the memories of the other inmates before leading a coordinated assault on a S.H.I.E.L.D. outpost. During the Avengers' fight with Zemo and his allies, Kobik teleports Zemo and Erik Selvig to the Himalayas.

After escaping the Himalayas, Zemo begins to form his "New Masters" group. He starts by recruiting Firebrand, Flying Tiger, and Plantman. They later encounter Steve Rogers, the original Captain America; Free Spirit; and Jack Flag. Zemo then tries to escape with Erik Selvig until Captain America enters his plane. Before he could kill Steve Rogers, Zemo is defeated by Flag. After Rogers pushes Flag out of the plane, he makes the plane crash into a building to kill Erik Selvig and Zemo. However, it is later revealed that Rogers kept Zemo in a cell. Rogers convinces Zemo that they are childhood friends, since Rogers's reality was rewritten by Kobik to believe he has been a Hydra double agent since childhood, and recruits him in his mission to kill the Red Skull. Zemo then starts to recruit all the supervillains who escaped from Pleasant Hill, forming the Army of Evil.

During the One World Under Doom storyline, Helmut Zemo opposes the policies of Sorcerer Supreme Doctor Doom and attempts to invade Latveria. However, he is killed and replaced with a Doombot replica that arrived with Hydra to surrender their allegiance to him. Doom states that he killed Zemo and Red Skull because of their connections with the Nazis and that the Nazis used Hydra to do their dirty work.

== Powers and abilities ==
Helmut Zemo has scientific expertise, marksmanship skills, and training in hand-to-hand combat. He is also depicted as a skilled strategist and leader.

His headband has built-in circuitry designed to disrupt psychic powers. Helmut Zemo carries various rifles and sometimes, a handheld spray gun for Adhesive X, a powerful bonding agent. Like his father, Helmut does not age. The Moonstones grant him a wide array of abilities, including gravity, light, or molecular manipulation, superhuman strength and durability, as well as flight.

== Reception ==
IGN ranked Helmut Zemo 40th in their Top 100 Comic Book Villains" list. David Harth of Comic Book Resources called Zemo one of the most important" and best Marvel villains owing to his "confounding schemes." Chase Magnett of ComicBook.com named Zemo one of the best Black Panther villains, calling him a "symbol of white supremacy." George Marston of Newsarama ranked Zemo as the 2nd best Captain America villains of all time.

== Other versions ==
=== Marvel Zombies ===
An alternate version of Helmut Zemo appears in the Marvel Zombies limited series. He is zombified and his Thunderbolts attack Thor before he receives aid from Nova.

=== MC2 ===
An alternate version of Helmut Zemo appears in the MC2 alternate universe. Red Skull and the Nazis had successfully conquered the Earth. This version is a scientific advisor to Red Skull's successor, Victor Von Doom and Reed Richards. After Doom is killed by Crimson Curse, Richards and Zemo fight to become his successor.

=== Ultimate Marvel ===
An alternate version of Helmut Zemo appears in the Ultimate Marvel imprint. This version is Loki's second-in-command Helmutt Zemo. After escaping The Room With No Doors, Loki murders Zemo.

=== Marvel MAX ===
An alternate version of Helmut Zemo appears in the Deadpool MAX series. He is an American white supremacist who claims to have descended from German nobility despite having come from a working-class home. He fosters a hatred of minorities due to his father having had an affair with a black woman as well as the irrational belief that Jewish doctors killed his mother with poisoned water. He finds a survivalist retreat dubbed "Whiteland" and plans to use sarin gas on his followers to incite a race war across the United States. However, his plans are foiled when Deadpool infiltrates the compound and accuses Zemo of possessing Jewish ancestry, which distracts Zemo's henchmen long enough for Deadpool to kill them and Zemo.

=== Old Man Logan ===
An alternate version of Helmut Zemo appears in the Old Man Logan universe. He is responsible for the deaths of most of the Avengers after turning the Thunderbolts against them. He only leaves Hawkeye alive out of spite for taking the Thunderbolts from him to begin with. Decades later, Hawkeye goes on a revenge killing spree against all the Thunderbolts for their betrayal. When he confronts Zemo in the Weapon X facility, he finds the villain in a wheelchair as Zemo had developed ALS while also working on recreating the Super Soldier Serum. While Hawkeye initially planned to leave Zemo humiliated in his condition, he instead decides to shoot dozens of arrows into Zemo using the last of his sight.

== In other media ==
=== Television ===
- Baron Helmut Zemo appears in The Avengers: United They Stand episode "Command Decision", voiced by Phillip Shepherd. This version is the leader of the Masters of Evil.
- Baron Helmut Zemo / Citizen V appears in Avengers Assemble, voiced by David Kaye. This version is a high-ranking operative of Hydra and leader of the Masters of Evil.
- Baron Helmut Zemo appears in the X-Men '97 episode "Tolerance is Extinction" Pt. 1, voiced by Rama Vallury.

=== Film ===
Baron Helmut Zemo appears in Avengers Confidential: Black Widow & Punisher, voiced by Eric Bauza.

==== Marvel Cinematic Universe ====
Helmut Zemo appears in media set in the Marvel Cinematic Universe (MCU), portrayed by Daniel Brühl. This version is a Baron of Sokovia and former special operations soldier who seeks revenge against the Avengers for the death of his family at the hands of Ultron, who was created by Tony Stark and Bruce Banner.

- Zemo first appears in the film Captain America: Civil War (2016).
- Zemo makes an additional appearance in the miniseries The Falcon and the Winter Soldier (2021).
- An alternate universe variant of Zemo appears in the Disney+ animated television series Marvel Zombies, voiced by Rama Vallury. Amidst a zombie apocalypse, this version reorganized the Raft as a sanctuary for survivors called the "City on the Sea", with John Walker serving as his second-in-command. Following a failed attempt to sacrifice Shang-Chi and Kamala Khan's survivor groups to a zombified Namor, Zemo joins Khan's group in traveling to New Asgard, where he is later killed by a zombie.

=== Video games ===
- Baron Helmut Zemo appears as a boss in the PlayStation, MS-DOS, Game Boy, and Game Gear versions of Iron Man and X-O Manowar in Heavy Metal.
- Baron Helmut Zemo appears as a boss in Marvel Avengers Alliance.
- Baron Helmut Zemo appears as a playable character in Marvel Contest of Champions.
- Baron Helmut Zemo appears as a playable character in Marvel Avengers Academy.
- Baron Helmut Zemo and Citizen V appear as separate downloadable playable characters in Lego Marvel's Avengers, voiced by Robin Atkin Downes. They are available via the "Masters of Evil" and "Thunderbolts" DLC packs respectively.
- Baron Helmut Zemo appears as a playable character in Lego Marvel Super Heroes 2, voiced by Tim Bentinck.
- Baron Helmut Zemo appears as a playable character in Marvel: Future Fight.
- Baron Helmut Zemo appears as a playable character in Marvel Strike Force.

=== Miscellaneous ===
Helmut Zemo appears in Marvel's Wastelanders: Hawkeye, voiced by James Saito. This version became King Zemo before dying a decade prior, leading to his teenage son Herman impersonating him.

=== Merchandise ===
- In 2013, Hasbro released an action figure of Helmut Zemo as part of the Marvel Legends action figure line.
- In 2021, Funko released a Funko Pop figure of Helmut Zemo inspired by the MCU incarnation of the character.
- In 2021, Hasbro released an action figure of Helmut Zemo inspired by the MCU incarnation of the character as part of the Marvel Legends action figure line.
