= The Winter Soldier (story arc) =

Marvel Comics story arc

- Cover of Captain America (vol. 5) #14, with art by Alex Schomburg and Steve Epting
- Publisher: Marvel Comics
- Publication date: September 2005 – April 2006
- Genre: Superhero
Title(s)
Captain America (vol. 5) #8–9, 11–14
- Main characters: Captain America; Winter Soldier

Creative team
- Writer: Ed Brubaker
- Pencillers: Steve Epting; Michael Lark
- Inkers: Steve Epting; Mike Perkins; Michael Lark
- Letterers: Chris Eliopoulos; Randy Gentile; Joe Caramagna
- Colorist: Frank D'Armata
- Editors: Tom Brevoort; Andy Schmidt; Molly Lazer; Aubrey Sitterson
- Complete Collection: ISBN 1302927337

"The Winter Soldier" is a story arc that ran from 2005 to 2006 in the fifth volume of Captain America, an American comic book series published by Marvel Comics. It was written by Ed Brubaker and drawn primarily by Steve Epting. The story follows Captain America as he discovers that his deceased former sidekick Bucky Barnes still lives as a brainwashed assassin known as the Winter Soldier.

In developing "The Winter Soldier", Brubaker drew inspiration from spy fiction, Cold War fiction, and the run of Captain America authored by Jim Steranko. Brubaker was particularly motivated by a desire to see Bucky Barnes return to active publication: the character was retroactively established in the 1960s as having died during World War II, and his extended absence from comics was for many decades a notable exception to the typically ephemeral nature of comic book deaths. While Bucky's revival was met with some initial hostility, "The Winter Soldier" was ultimately a critical and commercial success, and has been ranked by multiple outlets as the greatest Captain America story of all time. The story arc was loosely adapted into the 2014 film Captain America: The Winter Soldier.

== Plot ==
Nick Fury, director of the espionage agency S.H.I.E.L.D., briefs Captain America on the "Winter Soldier": an assassin active since the mid-twentieth century who seemingly does not age. Fury suspects that the Winter Soldier is a brainwashed Bucky Barnes, Captain America's former sidekick believed to have died during World War II. Fury further suspects that the Winter Soldier is linked to Aleksander Lukin, a Russian oligarch and former KGB general, and that Lukin is in possession of a Cosmic Cube, a powerful reality-warping object.

It transpires that the Winter Soldier is indeed Bucky, who survived apparent death after being recovered by the Soviets. He was clandestinely reprogrammed as an assassin, fitted with a bionic arm, and has remained active for decades by being cryogenically frozen between missions. Captain America tracks the energy signature from the Cosmic Cube to a facility in the Allegheny Mountains, where he faces the Winter Soldier. During the battle, Captain America seizes the Cube and uses it to dispel Bucky's brainwashing; anguished by the knowledge of the acts he has committed as the Winter Soldier, Bucky destroys the Cube and flees from the facility.

In an epilogue, it is revealed that Captain America's deceased adversary Red Skull lives in the mind of Lukin, having used the Cosmic Cube to transfer his consciousness into Lukin's body.

== Development ==
=== Context ===
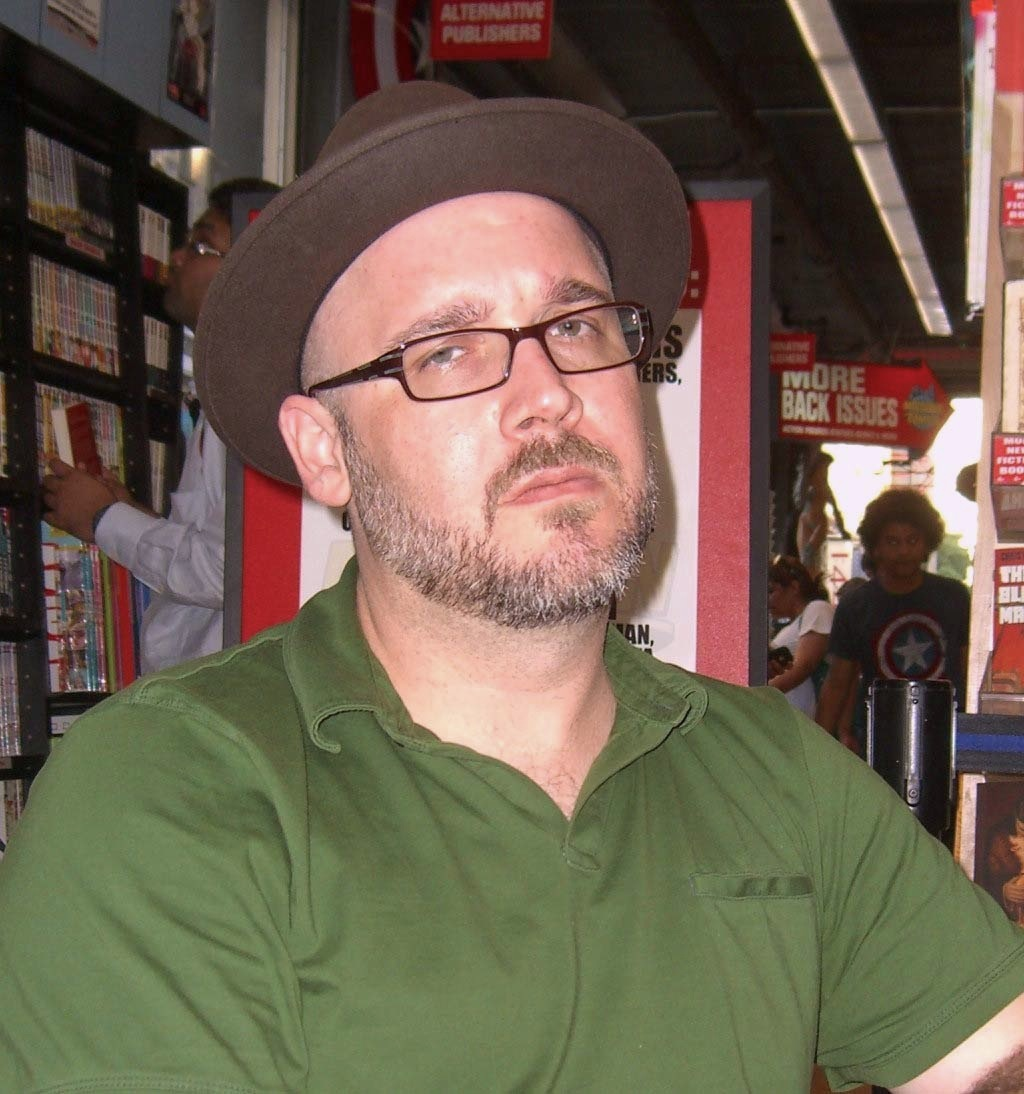
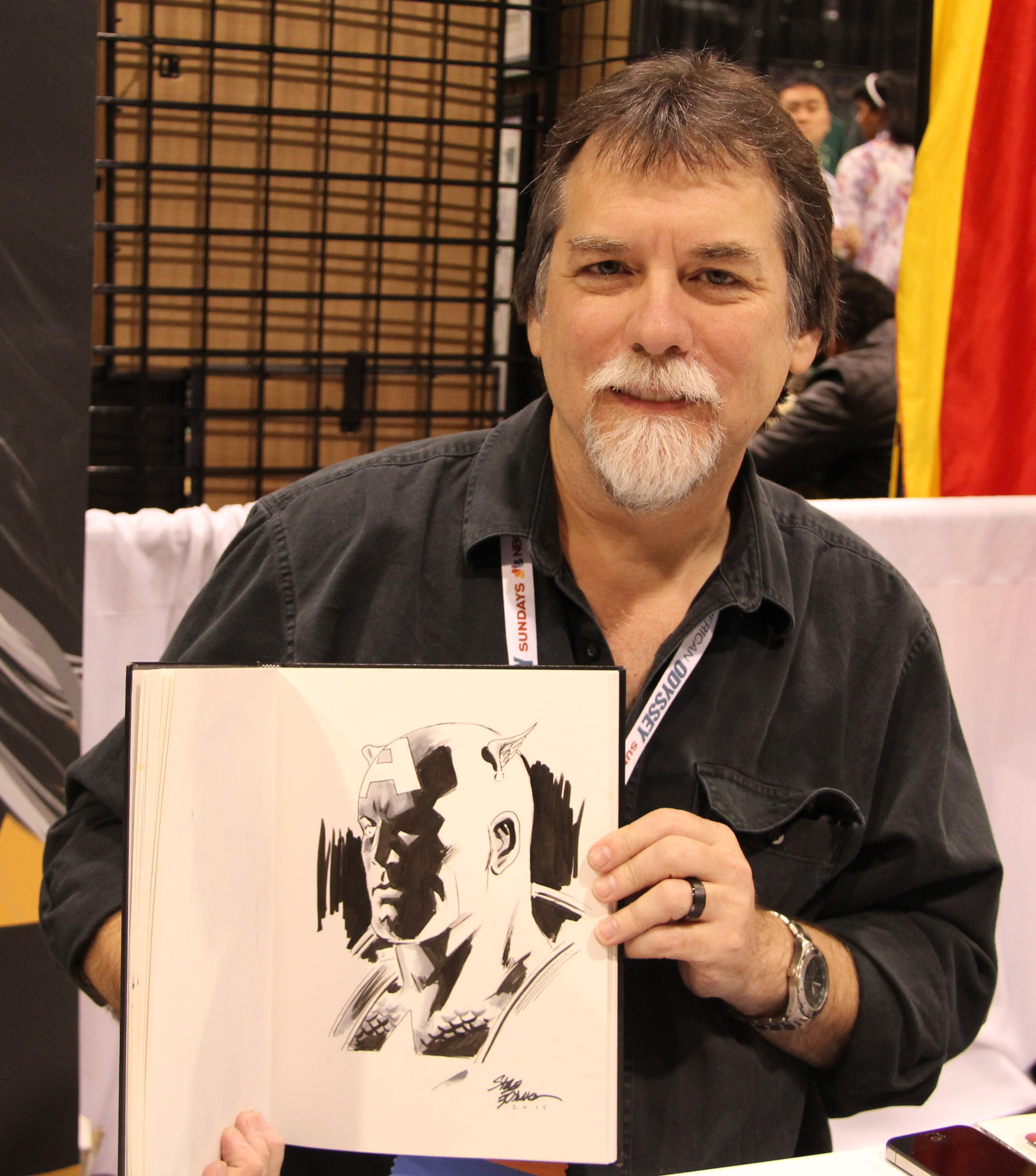
Ed Brubaker (top, pictured 2010) and Steve Epting (bottom, pictured 2015)

Bucky Barnes was introduced in 1941 as the teenaged sidekick to Captain America, and in 1964 was retroactively established as having died in the final days of World War II. The character remained deceased for many decades, contrasting the typically ephemeral nature of comic book deaths, where it is common for characters to die only briefly before returning to life through plot contrivances. Reportedly, Bucky was one of three deceased characters (Note: The others being Uncle Ben and Gwen Stacy, both supporting characters to Spider-Man.) whose revival was specifically forbidden by Marvel editorial.

In 2004, writer Ed Brubaker signed an exclusive contract with Marvel Comics following an extended period of exclusivity with DC Comics. He began writing a new volume of Captain America that same year, reorienting the series as an espionage thriller inspired by spy fiction and Cold War fiction. Brubaker had been a reader of Captain America since childhood, especially the brief run of issues authored by Jim Steranko, and sought to emulate Steranko's interpretation of Captain America functioning as a "sort of an operative [...] as some sort of cool Delta Force, special-mission kind of soldier". As a young reader, Brubaker was especially drawn to the character of Bucky. He stated that he first conceived of a story where Bucky was revealed to have been captured by Russian agents and re-introduced as a brainwashed villain around the age of 9 or 10:

I'd always been angry as a kid when I found out that Bucky dying was some huge retcon that they did because Stan Lee didn't want to have sidekicks. [Laughs.] So some part of me was always like, 'You know, if I ever get to write Captain America, I'm bringing Bucky back.'

=== Production ===
Brubaker broached the topic of reintroducing Bucky in his first conversation about his plans for Captain America with Marvel Comics editor-in-chief Joe Quesada. Though Quesada had long supported the idea of reviving Bucky, Captain America editor Tom Brevoort was strongly opposed, and had recently rejected a creative team who had proposed the idea. Brevoort gave Brubaker fourteen questions he was required to provide satisfactory answers to before he agreed to greenlight the story, including how Bucky survived his original presumed death and the cause of his amnesia. Brubaker reported that the questioning made "The Winter Soldier" a "much better and more intricate story", and resulted in a greater focus on the Soviet angle of the plot.

Beyond Brevoort's questioning, Brubaker stated that his concept for "The Winter Soldier" received generally little pushback from Marvel, and that the published story was effectively identical to his initial proposal. Certain elements not included in the proposal were integrated mid-production as the story developed, such as the inclusion of the Falcon as a supporting character and a subplot involving the re-introduction of the Red Skull's daughter Sin.

"Bucky's death was Stan Lee making Captain America more of the traditional Marvel hero. He needs a tragedy in his past, or he's not a Marvel character. But Stan was smart, because when he wrote the book, he always said when Bucky supposedly died, and talked about how his body was never found [...] He always left that thread dangling out there. And I always asked myself why."

— Ed Brubaker

In developing "The Winter Soldier", Brubaker stated that he sought to "tell a gripping Cap story that touched on some of the things I always loved" and wanted to avoid Captain America "giving speeches about what his costume means". He noted that to reverse Bucky's death meant "tak[ing] away Cap's biggest tragedy", and was thus conscious about replacing it with a new plot element that still reinforced the character as a "wistful man out of time, with the weight of the world on his shoulders".

In creating the Winter Soldier, Brubaker envisioned him as "a character in the classic Marvel model. Conflicted, a bit tortured, but a great guy at heart." Both the character's and story arc's name reference the Winter Soldier Investigation which sought to publicize war crimes committed by the United States during the Vietnam War, which itself was a reference to Thomas Paine's writings about "the summer soldier" in his pamphlet The American Crisis. Brubaker selected the name early in the pitch process, as it was a name "that could imply Russia's cold winters and the Cold War, that was also tied to atrocities in another war, and that connected all the way back to the American Revolution".

In addition to Brubaker, the creative team for "The Winter Soldier" included Steve Epting, who is credited as penciller for all but one of the issues that compose the story arc, which is drawn by Michael Lark. Epting, Lark, and Mike Perkins are alternately credited as inkers for the series; Chris Eliopoulos, Randy Gentile, and Joe Caramagna serve as letterers; and Frank D'Armata serves as colorist.

=== Releases ===
"The Winter Soldier" ran in the fifth volume of Captain America in issues 8 to 9, and issues 11 to 14. The story ran in issues cover dated from September 2005 to April 2006, with issue #8 released on November 17, 2004. The series has been anthologized several times, including as a trade paperback released in 2006, as part of the Marvel Graphic Novel Collection in 2012, as a Marvel Select hardcover in 2020, and under the Marvel Complete Collection line in 2020.

== Reception and legacy ==
"The Winter Soldier" was a critical and commercial success. The issue of Captain America featuring the reveal of Bucky as the Winter Soldier went to a second printing, and subsequent issues had "robust" sales. The story arc has placed on numerous best-of lists, with Comic Book Resources, Newsarama, and Screen Rant each ranking "The Winter Soldier" as the best Captain America story of all time.

Brubaker noted that the decision to revive Bucky was initially met with some hostility from readers, which he attributes in part to its proximity to a controversial storyline in The Amazing Spider-Man in which the long-deceased Gwen Stacy returns and has an affair with Norman Osborn. Reflecting on the storyline in 2011, Brubaker opined that in the intervening years the Winter Soldier had substantially increased in popularity to become "basically the most popular new Marvel character, probably since Deadpool".

Abraham Riesman of Vulture wrote that Bucky's return in "The Winter Soldier" was so successful that it "has become gospel". She argued that the storyline "resonated with people" due to its "heady brew" of themes, including classic espionage tropes, mental health, America's treatment of veterans, portrayals of violence in superhero comics, and "male bonding so powerful that it's regularly read as homoerotic". Critic Mark R. McDermott argued that Bucky's revival was "one of the more plausible comic book resurrections", but stated that he disliked the necessary loss of the aspect of "Bucky-as-martyr" as it had been an integral aspect of Captain America's character for many decades.

== In other media ==
"The Winter Soldier" was loosely adapted into the 2014 film Captain America: The Winter Soldier. Brubaker makes a non-speaking cameo appearance in the film, and in 2021 commented that he has earned more from the residuals for the cameo than he did from creating and writing the Winter Soldier.
