= Stucky (fandom) =

Depictions of a relationship between Captain America and the Winter Soldier

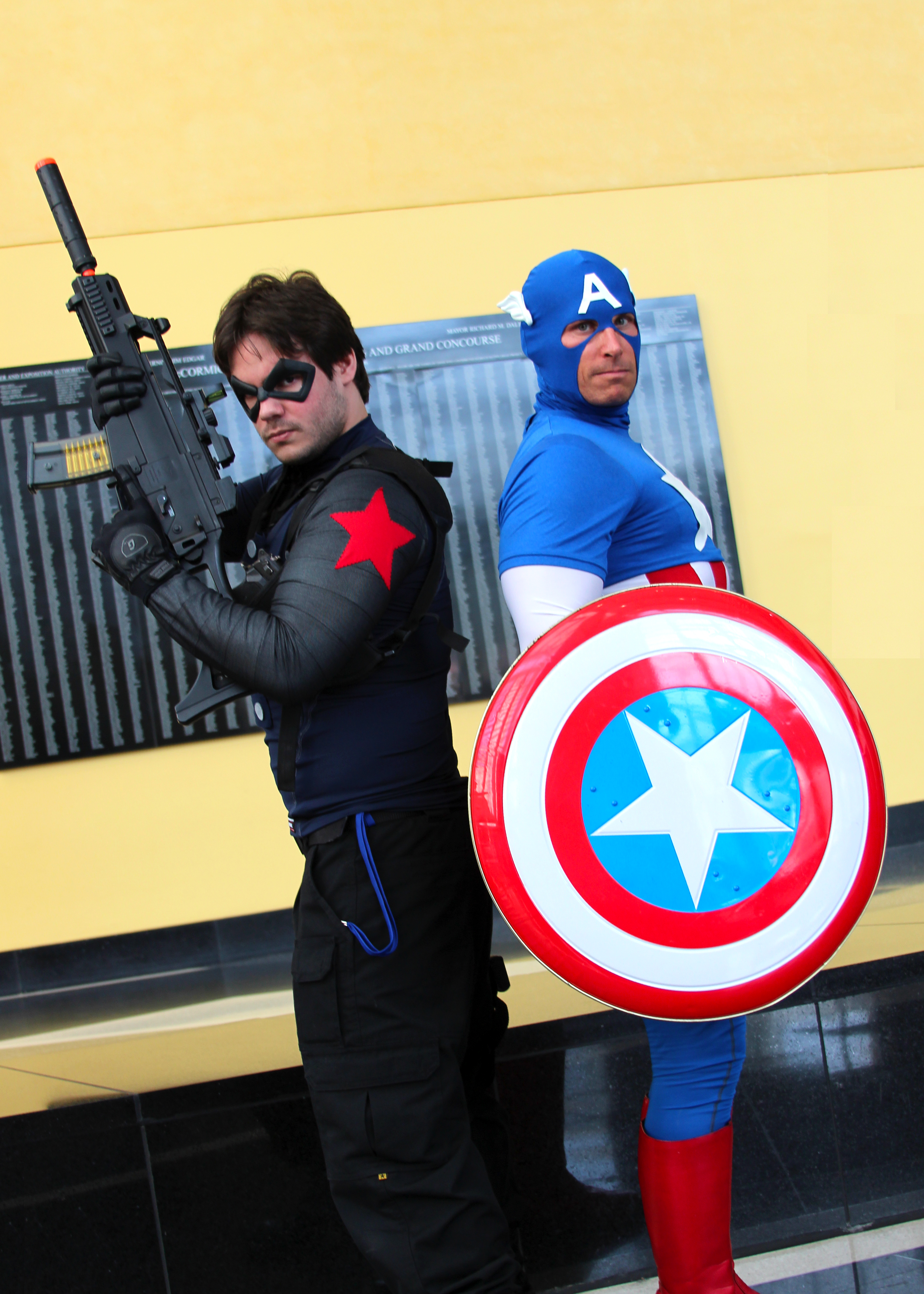
A duo cosplaying the two shipped characters.

In fandom, Stucky (also Steve/Bucky or Bucky/Steve (Note: The names Wintershield, Starbucks, and Barnes & Noble are also less commonly used.)) is the pairing of Steve Rogers (Captain America) and James Buchanan "Bucky" Barnes (the Winter Soldier), fictional characters who appear in comic books and related media produced by Marvel Comics. The pairing is a manifestation of shipping, a phenomenon in fandom wherein individuals create fan works that depict a romantic or sexual relationship between two characters whose relationship in the source material is typically neither romantic nor sexual; Stucky is an example of slash, a genre of fan works that focus on same-sex characters. In accordance with shipping naming conventions, Stucky is a portmanteau of "Steve" and "Bucky".

Though Rogers and Bucky have appeared in media dating to the 1940s, Stucky fan works grew substantially in popularity in the 2010s after the characters appeared in the Marvel Cinematic Universe (MCU). Several individuals associated with Marvel, including Winter Soldier co-creator Ed Brubaker, MCU director Joe Russo, and Rogers's and Bucky's respective actors Chris Evans and Sebastian Stan, have commented positively on Stucky and showed their openness to any interpretations of the relationship between the characters. Critics and commentators have used the popularity of Stucky in fandom to remark on a range of topics, including the lack of LGBT characters in superhero films and the nature of fandom on social media.

== Background ==
=== Marvel Comics ===
Steve Rogers and Bucky Barnes first appeared in Captain America Comics #1 (March 1941), which establishes Rogers as Captain America and Bucky as his teenaged sidekick. Bucky would be retroactively killed in 1964 in an Avengers comic which revealed he had died towards the end of WWII alongside the disappearance of Rogers and would not re-appear until Captain America (vol. 5) in 2005, where the character is brought back from his previous apparent death as the Winter Soldier, a brainwashed assassin. As a result of Bucky's extended absence from comics, and Rogers's initial characterization as an older fraternal figure to Bucky, the emergence of Stucky as a phenomenon in fandom is a relatively recent development. In early Marvel fandom communities focused on shipping (fan works that depict a romantic or sexual relationships between two characters whose relationship in the source material is typically neither romantic nor sexual, also known as a "ship") and slash fiction (shipping fan works featuring characters of the same sex), Rogers was most commonly depicted with Tony Stark / Iron Man in a pairing typically abbreviated as "Stony" or "Superhusbands".

While hero-and-sidekick relationships in comics have been interpreted as having a homoerotic subtext, (Note: The suggestion that hero-and-sidekick relationships in comics have a homoerotic subtext was originally made by Frederick Wertham in his 1954 book Seduction of the Innocent, which asserted that Batman and Robin's relationship promotes homosexuality and pederasty. The book was part of his campaign against comics, which he believed caused juvenile delinquency; his research has since been discredited.) in Marvel canon, the relationship between Rogers and Bucky is strictly platonic, and is not depicted as sexual or romantic. Rogers and Bucky are depicted in-canon as having a deep and meaningful personal bond, with some critics likening their relationship as wartime compatriots to Achilles and Patroclus.

=== Marvel Cinematic Universe ===
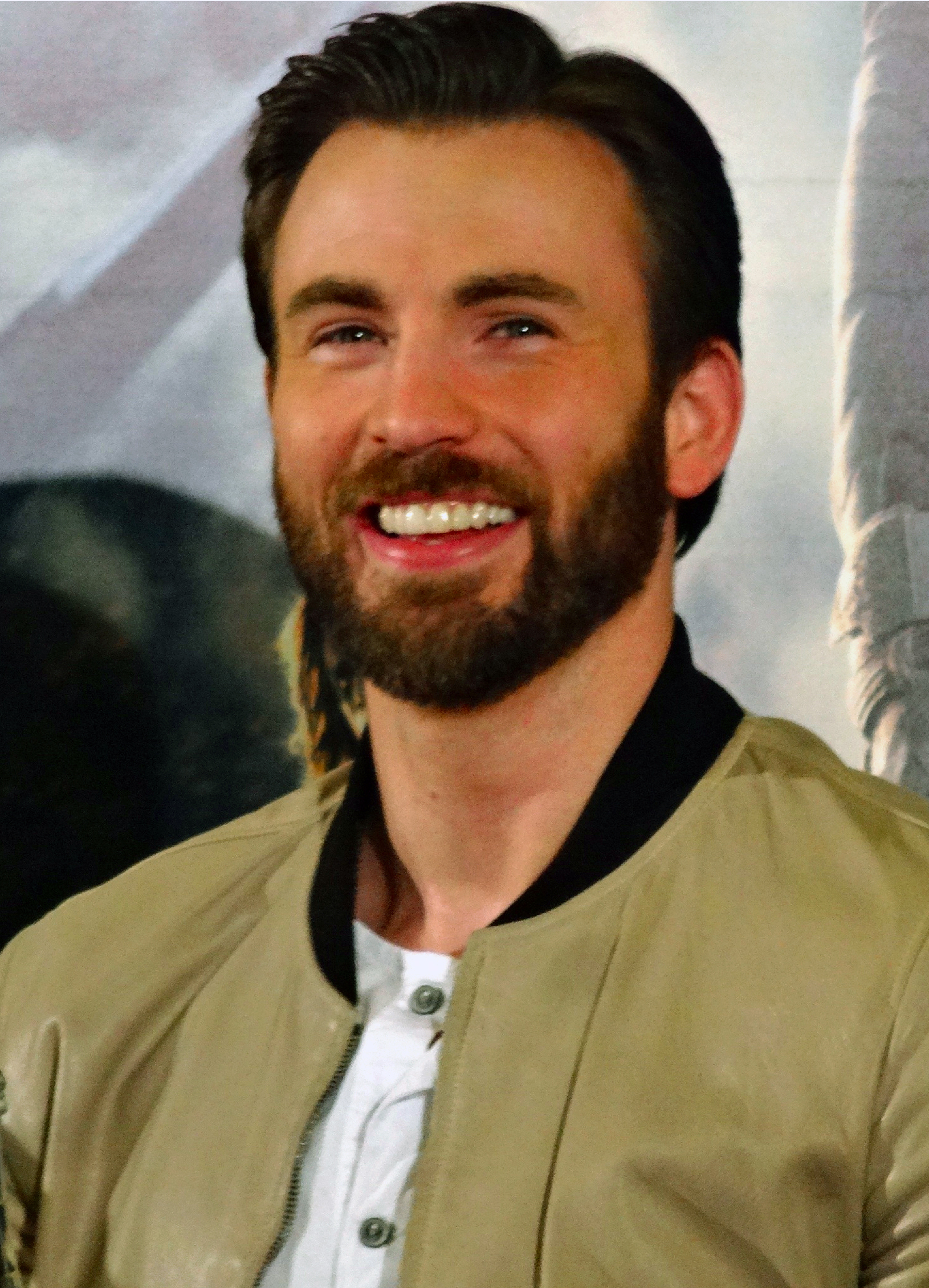
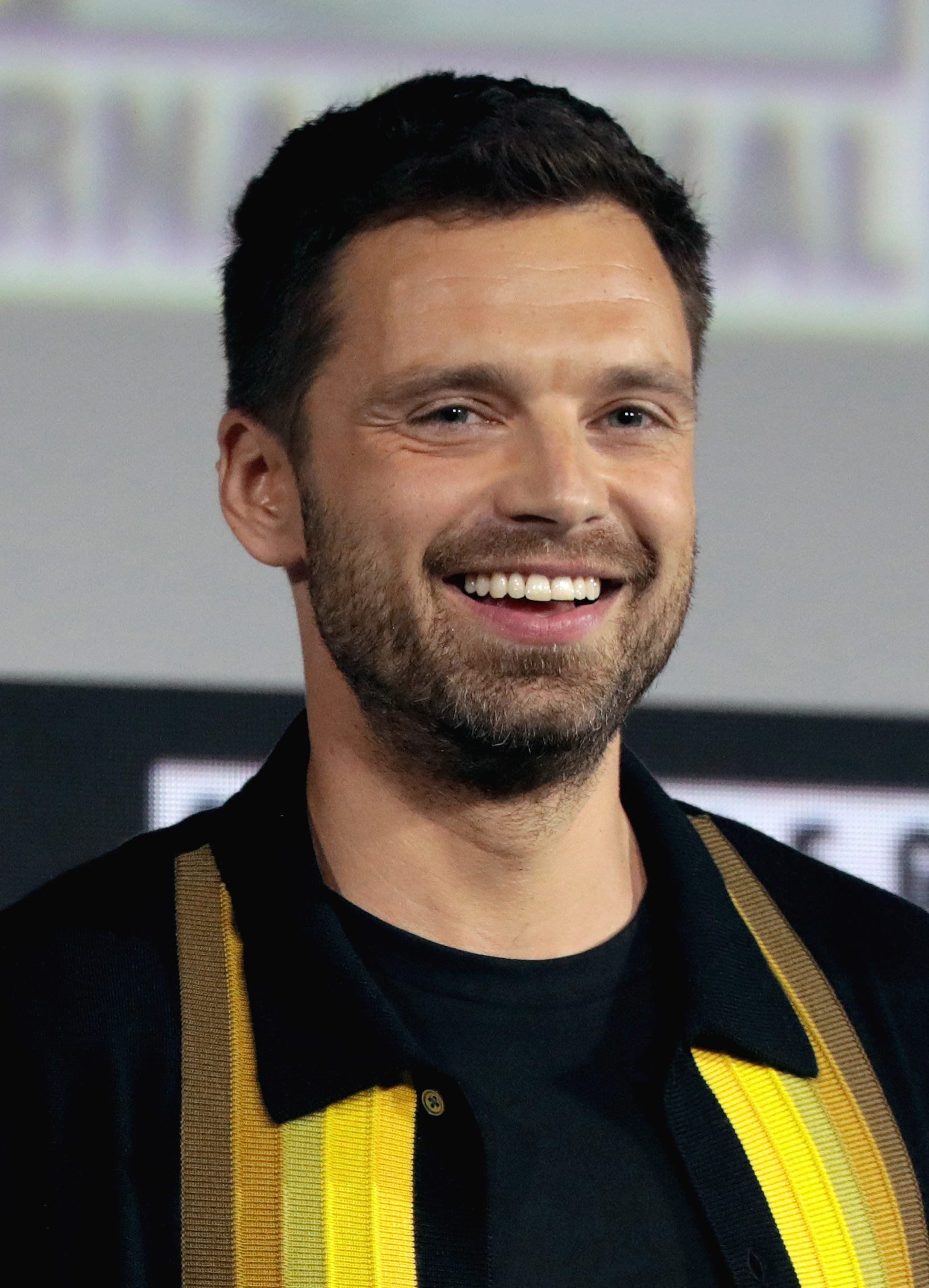
Actors Chris Evans (left) and Sebastian Stan (right), who portray Steve Rogers and Bucky Barnes, respectively, in the Marvel Cinematic Universe (MCU)

The popularity of Stucky as a ship in fandom rose substantially following the introduction of Rogers and Bucky to the Marvel Cinematic Universe (MCU) media franchise, where the characters have jointly appeared in five films – Captain America: The First Avenger (2011), Captain America: The Winter Soldier (2014), Captain America: Civil War (2016), Avengers: Infinity War (2018), and Avengers: Endgame (2019) – and the television series What If...? (2021). The MCU re-conceptualizes the nature of their relationship, presenting them as same-age lifelong best friends and establishes their bond as a key plot element and mutual character motivation. As a result, a shipping fandom developed in reaction to a supposed homoerotic subtext to Rogers's and Bucky's relationship. The ship name "Stucky", a portmanteau that blends the names "Steve" and "Bucky", became the name for the ship in accordance with shipping naming conventions.

Across the Captain America trilogy of films, Gavia Baker-Whitelaw of The Daily Dot notes that Steve continually "rebel[s] against authority for the sake of Bucky's wellbeing, escalating from disobeying orders in World War II to becoming an international fugitive in Civil War". The relationship serves as the driving plot to The Winter Soldier, where Bucky's memory of Steve causes him to overcome his conditioning as a brainwashed assassin; Bucky recalls his identity through Steve's declaration of "I'm with you till the end of the line", a phrase repeated by Rogers and Bucky throughout the series as an expression of kinship. Civil War again depicts their relationship as a central plot element, Rogers protecting Bucky after he is wrongly accused of committing a terrorist act, while also developing Sharon Carter as a love interest for Rogers. While Carter has an established history as a canonical love interest for Rogers in the comics, Joanna Robinson wrote in Vanity Fair that the depiction of Carter was the "one flaw in the otherwise great" film, arguing that the film's kiss between Steve and Sharon exists primarily to "put the nail in the coffin of speculation" around a homoerotic interpretation of Rogers's and Bucky's relationship. Rogers and Bucky appear in the next two films, Infinity War and Endgame, but less time is spent on their relationship. Robinson and other critics hypothesized that their interactions were minimized to build popularity for Sam Wilson / Falcon as he assumes the title of Captain America, (Note: As depicted in The Falcon and the Winter Soldier (2021).) and to emphasize the canonical love story between Rogers and Peggy Carter.

== Analysis and impact ==
Stucky as a phenomenon in fandom emerged from online communities that produce fan works. These online communities are typically mostly female, in contrast to the majority male mainstream comics fandom. Fan works featuring Stucky, which have been created in a wide range of media, including fan art, fanfiction, and fan videos, typically give prominence to emotional imagery and romantic subject material, as opposed to the action- and conflict-centered narratives of Marvel's comic and film source material. Stucky fan works thus "realize all the un-filmed narrative moments that fans want to see", with depictions of Rogers's and Bucky's domestic life in 1940s New York – largely unexplored in canonical source material – being a common trope in Stucky fan works. These works are often faithful to the real-world history of pre-war gay culture in New York City; Gay New York, a sociological text by LGBT historian George Chauncey, has been used by some fan creators to accurately depict aspects of this history, including real-life period-specific gay bars that existed in Rogers's canonical Brooklyn neighborhood.

Francesca Coppa argues that the Stucky fandom is the result of a "complex mix of objectification and identification with these characters", wherein the desire to see sexual or romantic scenarios involving Rogers and Bucky is based in part on sexual or romantic attraction to these characters that fans themselves possess. Coppa goes on to argue that Stucky represents not merely the objectification of two physically attractive male characters, but also the subjectification of Steve Rogers as character, "with fans writing stories that flesh out his politics, his relationships past and present, his religion, and his sexuality". In Captain America, Masculinity, and Violence: The Evolution of a National Icon, author J. Richard Stevens similarly argues that fans of Captain America use the character "to reconstruct and reconfigure cultural significance in their own lives", noting that "throughout the character's history, which contains messages from ultranationalist jingoism to a critique of the role of nationalism in the propagation of racism and terrorism, [Captain America's] narratives have provoked incredibly articulate responses." In the specific case of Stucky, Coppa notes that the unlikelihood of Marvel's acknowledging a queer reading of Rogers's and Bucky's relationship in canon "means that much fan energy is spent visualizing what a queer superhero relationship might look like". In this regard, Stucky as a phenomenon in shipping is notable in that it devotes significant focus to the characters' imagined gay or bisexual sexual identity, in contrast to slash fan works of the 1970s and 1980s that "distanc[ed] beloved characters from the stereotypes and even the identity of gayness", opting to instead depict the characters as "sharing a great, transcendent love that eliminated the boundaries of gender".

The popularity of Stucky in fandom has been widely commented on by mainstream pop culture and entertainment sources. In Tumblr's annual ranking of the most popular ships of the year (as measured by number of reblogs), Stucky first appeared in 2014 ranked 17th and peaked in 2016 as the 8th most popular ship on the platform. (Note: Stucky additionally placed 9th in 2015, 10th in 2018, 16th in 2019, 18th in 2020, 11th in 2021, 30th in 2022, and 73rd in 2023.) As of January 2026, over 70,000 Stucky fan works have been published on the fan work repository Archive of Our Own (AO3), making it both the most popular Marvel ship on the website and one of the most popular ships on the website overall. The 2018 novel Game Changer by Rachel Reid, later adapted into the 2025 television series Heated Rivalry, was first published in an adapted form as Stucky fanfiction on AO3.

=== #GiveCaptainAmericaABoyfriend ===
In May 2016, Twitter user Jess Salerno tweeted "#givecaptainamericaaboyfriend" in response to a similar internet campaign around the hashtag #GiveElsaAGirlfriend, which focused on Elsa from the 2013 film Frozen. The hashtag became a viral trending topic on Twitter, and was widely covered by the mainstream press. While the hashtag was ostensibly organized around fans who wished to see Stucky made canon, both it and #GiveElsaAGirlfriend were also broadly concerned with the lack of LGBT characters in media properties owned by Disney, of which Marvel is a subsidiary. The LGBT rights organization GLAAD commented that the hashtag was "a sign that audiences are eager for significant LGBT characters in their superhero movies".

The Hollywood Reporter cited #GiveCaptainAmericaABoyfriend as an example of how social media has altered the dynamic between creators and audiences, as the medium increases both visibility of fan discussions and the willingness of creators to respond to those discussions. The outlet further commented that #GiveCaptainAmericaABoyfriend "highlights demographic shifts that have yet to be reflected in the texts audiences are responding to", in reference to the popularity of Stucky relative to the lack of LGBT characters in superhero films.

== Response from Marvel ==
What's fascinating about the Cap-Bucky story as well is it's a love story. These are two guys who grew up together, and so they have that same emotional connection to each other as brothers would, and even more so because Bucky was all Steve had growing up.

— Joe Russo, Marvel Cinematic Universe director

Several individuals affiliated with Marvel have commented on Stucky, frequently in a context that affirms Rogers's and Bucky's canonical heterosexuality while offering support for the broader Stucky fandom.

Rogers's actor Chris Evans has commented positively on romantic interpretations on Rogers's relationship with Bucky, though he said that "it's just never been part of my approach to the character." When asked about Stucky in a separate interview with GQ, Bucky's actor Sebastian Stan similarly responded that "I think it's great. Movies are for people to relate to in whatever way they want," adding that "I don't think of the character that way, though. But there's no right or wrong answer." Evans has also remarked that Bucky is "one of the more precious relationships for Steve Rogers [...] it's one of the few relationships that he can identify as anything we would call home," which has been quoted by outlets in the context of their coverage of Stucky. An image from a fan photo op of Evans and Stan at Wizard World Philadelphia posing with cosplayers kissing while dressed as Rogers and Bucky went viral in 2016.

Joe Russo, who co-directed four of the five MCU films in which Rogers and Bucky jointly appear, has described their relationship as a love story but also indicated the kind of emotional connection to be that between brothers, later saying that "people have interpreted that relationship all kinds of ways, and it's great to see people argue about it, what that relationship means to them. We will never define it as filmmakers, explicitly, but however people want to interpret it, they can interpret it." Screenwriters Christopher Markus and Stephen McFeely, who jointly wrote the Captain America film trilogy, Infinity War, and Endgame, though describing the Rogers–Bucky relationship as platonic, likened it to a love story and described the characters as soulmates in the foreword of the trade paperback edition of the comic book series Captain America: White.

Other individuals who have remarked positively on Stucky include writers Ed Brubaker, who co-created the Winter Soldier with artist Steve Epting, and Mark Waid, who remarked in an interview with Marvel regarding his 2016 run on the comic book series Black Widow that both Black Widow and Bucky "have had a crush" on Steve Rogers. A scene in the 2019 comic book Gwenpool Strikes Back #3 in which Gwenpool (a character who is aware she is in a comic book) says that Rogers and Bucky "look good together" was interpreted by commentators as a humorous acknowledgement of the Stucky fandom by Marvel.

== See also ==
- Homosexuality in the Batman franchise
- LGBT themes in American mainstream comics
- LGBT themes in comics
