= Death of Captain America =

Death of Captain America may refer to:

- "The Death of Captain America", 2007 comic book storyline
- "The Strange Death of Captain America", 1969 comic book storyline
