= Two Americas (comics) =

- Cover for Captain America #602. Art by Gerald Parel.
- Publisher: Marvel Comics
- Publication date: March – June 2010
- Genre: Superhero
- Title(s): Captain America #602–605 (4 issues)
- Main character(s): Captain America; The Falcon; William Burnside

Creative team
- Writer: Ed Brubaker
- Penciller: Luke Ross
- Inker(s): Luke Ross; Butch Guice
- Letterer: Joe Caramagna
- Colorist: Dean V. White
- Editor(s): Tom Brevoort; Joe Quesada; Lauren Sankovitch
- Hardcover: ISBN 0-7851-4510-9

"Two Americas" is a four-issue Captain America story arc written by Ed Brubaker, drawn by Luke Ross and published by Marvel Comics. The story arc takes place in Captain America #602-605, in the fifth volume of the title.

== Plot synopsis ==
Captain America ("Bucky" Barnes) and the Falcon investigate intelligence reports from S.H.I.E.L.D. about an anti-government organization led by William Burnside, the Captain America of the 1950s. Burnside is revealed to be the new leader of the far right terrorist group 'Watchdogs'. The original Captain America, Steve Rogers, expresses his reluctance to operate alongside his colleague, and he decides to pass on the mantle while psychologically reflecting on the recent American civil war.

== Controversy ==
Captain America #602 drew controversy upon publication for the similarity between the protesters depicted in the comic and the Tea Party movement. Particularly drawing scorn was a panel of a protester holding a sign that read "Tea Bag the Libs Before They Tea Bag You!" Also drawing controversy were remarks made by the Falcon implying that the crowd is racist.

In his column on Comic Book Resources, Marvel Comics Editor-in-Chief Joe Quesada apologized for the sign, claiming that it was mistake added by the letterer at the last minute.

== Collected editions ==
The story has been collected into an individual volume:

- Captain America: Two Americas (collects Captain America #602-605 and Who Will Wield The Shield? one-shot, 128 pages, August 2010, ISBN 0-7851-4510-9)

== See also ==
- Ed Brubaker
