= Captain America: Reborn =

2009–10 comic book limited series

- Captain America: Reborn #1, Cover by Bryan Hitch

Publication information
- Publisher: Marvel Comics
- Format: Limited series
- Publication date: July 2009 – January 2010
- No. of issues: 6
- Main character(s): Captain America; Bucky Barnes; Sharon Carter; Black Widow; Red Skull; Norman Osborn; Sin; Crossbones

Creative team
- Written by: Ed Brubaker
- Penciller: Bryan Hitch
- Inker: Butch Guice

Captain America: Reborn is a six-issue (originally intended to be five issues) monthly comic book limited series published by Marvel Comics between July 2009 and January 2010. The series was written by Ed Brubaker, illustrated by Bryan Hitch, and inked by Butch Guice. The series reveals the truth regarding the death of the original Captain America, Steve Rogers, in the story arc "The Death of Captain America", and revives him in the contemporary Marvel Universe.

== Background ==
The series was announced April 2009, with the title of "Reborn". More information was released on June 15, two days before the release of Captain America #600 (which serves as the prelude to the limited edition series). The complete title was later announced as Captain America: Reborn.

== Plot ==
=== Captain America #600 ===
On the first anniversary of Captain America's death, citizens disputed about whether to honor him as a patriot or to hate him for being a traitor. Throughout the series, Sharon Carter is looking for the agent she gave the gun to that was used to kill Steve Rogers. Using a device from Nick Fury, Sharon tracks down the agent and hypnotizes him to make him reveal where he put the gun.

As Bucky reflects on what is happening to the country, Rikki Barnes tells Patriot that she wants to be Bucky's new partner. Patriot agrees to introduce the two, even though Bucky is not looking for a new partner, because Steve would have wanted it. Meanwhile, Crossbones and Sin escape from a H.A.M.M.E.R. holding facility in Colorado, and Red Skull returns still trapped in Aleksander Lukin's body. In Central Park, Falcon, Black Widow, Bucky, Luke Cage, Jessica Drew, and Clint Barton are without their costumes. All have a teleportation spell ready in case Norman Osborn and his Dark Avengers attempt to capture them. Osborn, Sentry, and Ms. Marvel manage to find the group while hovering over the park, Osborn decides not to attack them. Instead, Osborn appears in front of the crowd, and says that the gathering, thought to be illegal, was approved by H.A.M.M.E.R. Osborn declares that they will honor Captain America for who he was. The crowd shouts Captain America's name and it upsets the Avengers who were present. In the midst of this situation, Sharon appears before the Avengers and declares that there is still a way to save Steve.

=== Prelude ===
At the H.A.M.M.E.R. holding facility in Colorado, Sin is being questioned by H.A.M.M.E.R. agents about a second shooter in the murder of Captain America. They promise her freedom in exchange for the shooter. They figure that since Red Skull is dead, she does not need to be loyal to him anymore. Sin laughs at this, and tackles a H.A.M.M.E.R agent, and whispers something in his ear. She is about to escape when Bullseye captures her. Later, Bullseye and Osborn are talking with the agent Sin attacked, and he said that she whispered, "Why are you sure that he is dead?" Osborn declares that this is a problem, but the question is whether Sin was talking about her father or about Captain America.

=== Reborn ===
Sharon, Falcon, Vision, and Hank Pym are meeting at Hank's lab. While Bucky and Black Widow infiltrate a H.A.M.M.E.R. Helicarrier, Sharon explains to everyone how she shot Captain America. When they examine the gun, they discover that it is technology sponsored by Doctor Doom. As Arnim Zola explains to Osborn, the gun froze Steve in space and time rather than killing him. Sharon further explains she was captured by Red Skull and used as part of a device that would bring Steve back. Steve questions what is happening to him, but appears to be preparing to go along with the situation and fight the battles of World War II all over again.

Osborn approaches Sin and Crossbones about a mission. Captain America flashes to the point in time when he was subjected to the Super Soldier serum by Abraham Erskine. Meanwhile, Bucky and Black Widow have been apprehended by H.A.M.M.E.R. Agents. Osborn then tells Black Widow to seek out Sharon Carter and order her to turn herself in before the current Captain America is also killed.

Captain America flashes to another point in his life where the Inuit found his frozen body. He then flashes toward the Kree-Skrull War where he briefly talks with Vision. He gives Vision a message that Vision is commanded to forget until the time is right. Back in the present, Bucky is freed by Ant-Man and then rescued by Falcon who fights Ghost. Meanwhile, Sharon has turned herself in. At the same time, Sin and Crossbones locate Red Skull and take him to Latveria so that he could be given a living body.

When they arrive in Latveria, Zola has created a machine that will bring back Captain America. Captain America is now at the point in time where he and Rick Jones are fighting Hydra. Back in the present, Osborn holds a press conference about Sharon's surrender. At the Avengers Mansion, Mister Fantastic reveals to Pym that the gun used to shoot Captain America used tachyon particles which are linked to the nanoparticles in Sharon's blood. He also theorizes that Captain America's body is somehow out of sync with their reality, which was why Sharon is the key to bringing him back. Suddenly, Vision interrupts them - it seems that Mister Fantastic's last statement has triggered Captain America's message. Meanwhile, Sharon is brought into Latveria and hooked up to the device that she previously destroyed. The machine is connected to both Sharon and Red Skull, enabling the latter to possess Steve.

Aboard an A.I.M. transport ship, Sharon tries reaching out to Steve Rogers telling him to not let Red Skull win. Captain America responds by kicking her in the face. When Sharon argues that Osborn is pulling the strings, Captain America then says he will be meeting with the president to inform him of his return after he takes care of the Avengers who have been tailing him in stealth for the last hour.

Suddenly Vision phases through the transport ship's walls, but is quickly frozen by Sin using a new weapon. The Avenger's Quinjet is then shot down, crashing in Washington D.C.'s Reflecting Pool. The A.I.M. transport lands and a battle then ensues between the Avengers and the A.I.M. agents.

The real Steve Rogers, trapped inside his own mind, is in an alternate New York run by Red Skull. After being discovered by Nazi soldiers, Steve escapes down a dark alley where he finds Uncle Sam posters, refashioned to the image of Red Skull. Steve punches through the wall, where he catches Red Skull off guard, and the two fight.

Aboard the transport ship, Red Skull becomes disorientated from the mental attack of Steve Rogers. Captain America then informs Zola to release the Super MODOK Squadron. Bucky spots Captain America and Sin emerging from the transport. Sin charges towards Bucky, only to be knocked away by his shield. Red Skull battles Bucky at the Lincoln Memorial, but Steve regains control of his body and the Red Skull returns to his robot body. Sharon uses Pym's size-changing technology to enlarge Red Skull and prevent him from escaping, after which he is defeated by Vision.

=== Epilogue ===
The Captain America: Reborn series concludes with the one shot, Captain America: Who Will Wield the Shield? In Captain America's Brooklyn hideout, Bucky brainstorms ideas for a new costume. After Black Widow poses the question why there couldn't be two Captain Americas, Bucky states "there's only one Cap...and it's Steve Rogers." In another room, Sharon Carter expresses concerns about Steve not being able to sleep for the past four days. Steve explains that after the recent ordeal, he fears sleeping because he does not want to "skip away again." After not being able to devise a new costume, Black Widow convinces Bucky to don the flag and shield and "go out for one last hurrah." Steve leaves Sharon asleep as he too dons the flag and goes to the rooftop for some time to think. Steve sees Bucky and Black Widow leaving the loft on a motorcycle and follows them.

As Steve watches from the rooftop, Bucky and Black Widow confront Mister Hyde and other prisoners who had escaped from the Raft prison that morning. As Hyde is about to escape, Bucky spots Steve and throws the shield to him. Steve leaps from the building, grabs the shield, and dives into Hyde. Steve offers the shield back to Bucky who declines it. The two then take a stroll along the East River, where they discuss who will continue as Captain America. Steve expresses that he wants Bucky to continue as Captain America, even though Bucky explains he does not want to. Steve holds out the shield and asks Bucky to "do it for [him]." Bucky accepts. Back in the loft, Steve explains to Sharon that he couldn't tell Bucky the real reasons for letting him carry on as Captain America. After reliving the past and seeing the future, Steve fears Bucky would die if he did not continue as Captain America.

Steve visits the White House, where he meets Barack Obama and is granted a presidential pardon for the events of the Superhuman Registration Act. He then explains to Obama that he is not ready to carry the shield. Obama accepts, but states that he has a feeling that "this country's going to need to call on you for something much bigger...."

== Bibliography ==
- Captain America #600
- Captain America: Reborn Prologue (online comic)
- Captain America: Reborn #1–6
- Captain America: Who Will Wield the Shield?

== See also ==
- The Death of Captain America
- Fallen Son: The Death of Captain America
