= The Strange Death of Captain America =

Marvel Comics story arc

- Cover of Captain America #113
- Publisher: Marvel Comics
- Publication date: February – May 1969
- Genre: Superhero
Title(s)
Captain America #110, 111, 113
- Main characters: Captain America; Madame Hydra; Rick Jones

Creative team
- Writer: Jim Steranko
- Artist: Jim Steranko
- Inkers: Joe Sinnott (#110, 111); Tom Palmer (#113)
- Letterers: Sam Rosen (#110, 111); Artie Simek (#113)
- Editor: Stan Lee

"The Strange Death of Captain America" is a 1969 story arc written and illustrated by Jim Steranko published in Captain America, an American comic book series published by Marvel Comics. The story follows the superhero Captain America as he struggles with his lack of a secret identity, while taking on Rick Jones as his new sidekick and fending off the neo-fascist terrorist group Hydra under its new leader Madame Hydra.

Steranko began working at Marvel in the late 1960s, having gained a profile as a popular illustrator and comic book artist on the basis of his avant-garde and surrealist art style. In developing his run on Captain America, Steranko sought to reverse what he saw as deviations from the World War II-era story formulas that had initially generated acclaim and popularity for the character. His run is distinguished by its use of a cinematically influenced aesthetic, characterized by heavy use of answering shots, pan and tracking sequences, dramatic lighting, and reaction inserts.

"The Strange Death of Captain America" has been acclaimed by comics critics and creators. Despite its short length of only three issues and the later reversal of several of the changes made by Steranko to the character's status quo, it is regarded as highly influential in the editorial history of Captain America, with scholars considering the story arc as transitional point from the character's origins as a patriotic wartime hero towards stories that were more responsive to the changing political realities of the post-war era.

== Plot ==
At Avengers Mansion in New York City, the Hulk's sidekick Rick Jones finds the uniform of Bucky Barnes, the deceased sidekick of Captain America. Jones dons the uniform and asks Captain America to make him his new sidekick, a request he rejects. Suddenly, they are alerted that the neo-fascist terrorist group Hydra is attacking the city's water's supply. Captain America defeats the Hydra henchmen with assistance from Jones, and agrees to take Jones on as his new partner.

Later, Captain America is ambushed by Hydra assassins under the command of its new leader Madame Hydra while in the guise of Steve Rogers, his civilian identity; he reflects on how his lack of a secret identity exposes himself and his companions to danger. Shortly thereafter, Jones experiences a violent psychedelic hallucination after he picks up a letter from Hydra laced with a psychoactive gas intended for Captain America. In a confrontation between Captain America, Jones, and Hydra, Captain America is shot and falls into a river; only his shirt and a mask with Steve Rogers' facial features, both riddled with bullet holes, are recovered.

The revelations that Captain America is dead and that "Steve Rogers" was a false identity become public. A funeral held by the Avengers is attacked by Hydra, though Captain America suddenly appears to join the fight. In the ensuing confrontation, Hydra is beaten back and Madame Hydra dies. Captain America privately reveals to the Avengers that he is Steve Rogers, that his death was a ruse, and that as Captain America has returned while the public believes Steve Rogers to be dead, he once again has a secret identity.

== Development ==
=== Context ===
Captain America was revived as a standalone ongoing comic book in 1968, following a five-year period in which stories starring the title character were published in the anthology series Tales of Suspense. The revival was initially written and edited by Stan Lee with art by Captain America co-creator Jack Kirby, both of whom had authored stories featuring the character dating back to the 1940s. Many of the comics in Lee and Kirby's revival of Captain America were referential to the character's roots as a patriotic World War II-era superhero; stories featured, for example, an Adolf Hitler impersonator and the Nazi villain Red Skull as antagonists.

Jim Steranko began working for Marvel in the late 1960s, after previously working at Harvey Comics as writer and illustrator for the comic Spyman under editor and Captain America co-creator Joe Simon. His first work at Marvel was as inker for the ongoing feature "Nick Fury, Agent of S.H.I.E.L.D." in the anthology Strange Tales, which was also illustrated by Kirby; Steranko would later assume Kirby's role as illustrator for the series. By the time his run on Captain America began in 1969, Steranko had already achieved a high degree of acclaim and notability for his avant-garde art style, which draws inspiration from op art and artists associated with the surrealist movement such as Salvador Dalí.

=== Production ===
"To my viewpoint, Marvel didn't know what to do with [Captain America] and tried a number of scenarios, all of which were inappropriate and rejected by readers. By the time I got there, they had revealed his secret identity and put him in situations that made him interchangeable with any of the Marvel heroes. I restored the secret identity and hoped to maneuver him back into the patriotic forum for which he was created."

— Jim Steranko

After publishing Captain America #109 (January 1969), which features a retelling of Captain America's origin story, Kirby departed as the regular artist for the series. Steranko requested and was given authorship of Captain America by Lee in part to resolve a dispute between the two: Steranko had quit "Nick Fury, Agent of S.H.I.E.L.D." after Lee placed a fill-in issue in the middle of Steranko's run that Steranko felt had broken the series' continuity. Comics scholar Ben Saunders notes how Steranko's run on "Agent of S.H.I.E.L.D." had elevated that title from a "second-tier strip into a fan favourite", and that Lee "clearly hoped that Steranko would bring a fresh feel to Captain America's adventures, too".

Steranko sought to reestablish what he saw as "the formula that had made [Captain America] a cultural icon". To this end, he had three primary goals for his run: the first was to reestablish Captain America's secret identity, following his unmasking in Captain America #105 (1968). Steranko felt this decision had diminished "the universal mystique once surrounding" the character, and made him "something less than the quintessential symbol of patriotism". He also sought to resolve the character's ongoing guilt over the death of his wartime sidekick Bucky Barnes, and to introduce new villains who were more contemporary than the World War II-era adversaries the character continued to face. The former was resolved through the introduction of Rick Jones as the new Bucky – that the new Bucky would be Jones was a directive from Lee, according to Steranko – while the former was resolved through the addition of Hydra, who Steranko had previously used as villains in "Agent of S.H.I.E.L.D.", to Captain America's rogues' gallery.

An excerpt of Rick Jones' hallucination in Captain America #111, showcasing Steranko's surrealist art style

In developing the artwork for his run, Steranko traded the self-described "zap art style" he had used for "Agent of S.H.I.E.L.D." in favor of one he described as "more expressive and sophisticated, more worthy of [Captain America's] historical eminence". To this end, he developed a more cinematic aesthetic characterized by its use of answering shots, pan and tracking sequences, dramatic lighting, and reaction inserts. Steranko's art in general is highly referential, to both comics and other media: the climax of "The Strange Death of Captain America" is a reference to the story "Spy Ambush" from Captain America Comics #10 (1942), while Rick Jones' hallucination is influenced by Alfred Hitchcock's 1945 film Spellbound. Steranko used actor Burt Lancaster as reference for both the visual appearance and personality of Steve Rogers, stating that he drew the character as "a living powerhouse" by "layering muscle on top of muscle" to achieve anatomy that was "realistic, yet of ultrahuman proportion". Steranko also designed a new logo for the ongoing Captain America comic book.

Beyond Steranko, creative staff for "The Strange Death of Captain America" included Joe Sinnott and Tom Palmer as inkers, and Sam Rosen and Artie Simek as letterers. The centerspread in the run's final issue was penciled, inked, lettered, and colored by Steranko, and was the first time that Marvel had published a spread that had been fully illustrated and formatted in this manner by a single individual.

Credit for authorship of "The Strange Death of Captain America" has been the subject of dispute. According to the Grand Comics Database, Steranko stated in a 1970 interview published in Fantastic Fanzine that he plotted the issues while the dialogue was written by Lee. Steranko has subsequently downplayed Lee's involvement and expressed frustration over not receiving full authorship credit for "The Strange Death of Captain America", as this has impacted his royalty payments for reprints of the story arc. Brian Cronin of Comic Book Resources notes that Lee is not credited as a writer of any of the issues in Steranko's run, and that Steranko has stated that he was paid a full writing credit for his issues of Captain America; Cronin hypothesized that Lee's direct role in the story was likely limited to dialogue adjustments. In 2015, Steranko stated in a post on Twitter that Marvel was now crediting him as the sole author of "The Strange Death of Captain America".

=== Release ===
"The Strange Death of Captain America" was originally published in Captain America issues #110 (February 1969), #111 (March 1969), and #113 (May 1969); Captain America #112 (April 1969) is a fill-in issue written by Lee and illustrated by Kirby, as Steranko missed the publication deadline. (Note: Captain America #112 is a summary of Captain America's backstory, framed as a recollection by the superhero Iron Man as he reflects on Captain America's death. Kirby reportedly produced the penciled artwork for the issue's interior pages and cover in just two days.) The series has been anthologized several times, notably as a Marvel Masterworks edition published in 2006, and as part of the Captain America volume of the Penguin Classics Marvel Collection published in 2022.

== Reception ==
=== Critical response ===
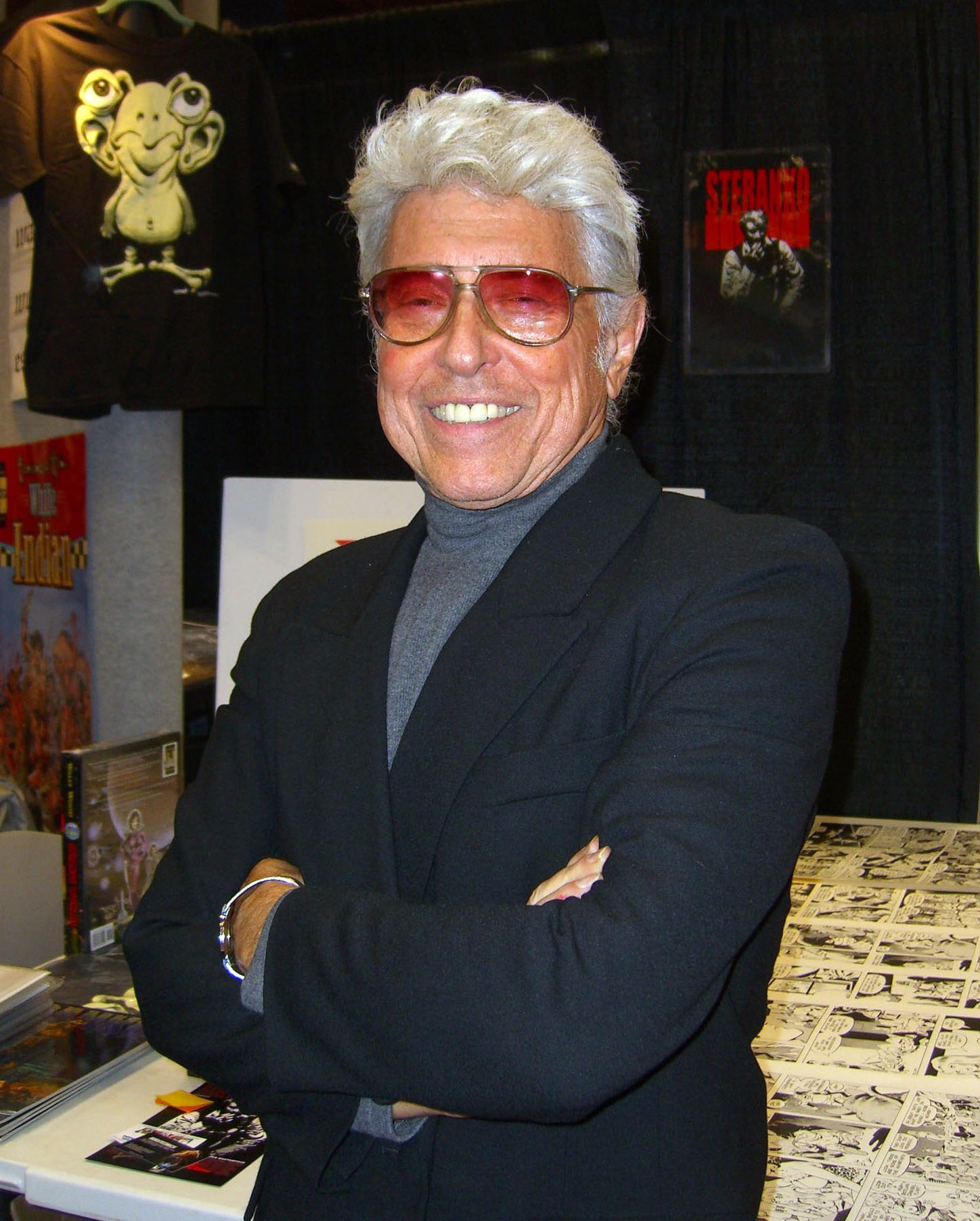
Jim Steranko in 2012

"The Strange Death of Captain America" has been acclaimed by comics critics and creators. In its commemoration of the story arc's fiftieth anniversary, the ArtCenter College of Design wrote that "many still consider [it] the greatest Captain America story ever told, for both its story and its art" and noted its reputation as "a tour-de-force of [Steranko's] verbal and visual storytelling skills and talents that branded him the Jimi Hendrix of Comics". Writer Ed Brubaker cited Steranko's run as an influence on his own run of Captain America, particularly his storyline "The Winter Soldier", and writer-producer Jeph Loeb described the run as "one of the things that helped define what it is that I do".

On its list of "The Ten Essential Captain America Stories", Comics Alliance ranked "The Strange Death of Captain America" first, commending its "psychedelic visuals" and calling its two-page spread artwork "some of the greatest in comics history". Screenrant listed Steranko's run second on its list of the "10 Best Captain America Runs of All Time", describing it as containing "perhaps the most important comics in Cap's history" and offering praise for its "vivid, boundary-breaking style, with inventive layouts and pop-art psychedelia".

=== Legacy ===
Lee would ultimately not maintain many of the changes introduced to Captain America by Steranko. Rick Jones departed Captain America to join up with Captain Mar-Vell in Captain Marvel #17 (October 1969), and Marvel's first African-American superhero Falcon was introduced as Captain America's new sidekick shortly thereafter; Madame Hydra would also be revived in Captain America #180 (December 1974) with the new name "Viper". Captain America's questioning of his place in the world as a 'man out of time' would quickly return as a recurring plot and thematic element of the series, contrasting Steranko's desire to position the character as a more iconoclastic and mythic figure.

Despite these reversals and the general brevity of Steranko's run, "The Strange Death of Captain America" is nevertheless regarded as highly influential in the editorial history of Captain America. Comics scholar Ben Saunders writes that its contemporary artwork belies its status as "an essentially nostalgic approach to the character and concept", representing "the last serious effort to revive the World War II formula that first established the character as a national icon–the last attempt to present Captain America as an uncomplicated symbol of the American fighting spirit, without qualms or misgivings, and mercifully free of psychological trauma". He writes that the ultimate abandonment of this formula "reflects less upon [Steranko] than it does upon the historical transformation of American society in the years since the war", and that subsequent changes such as the introduction of Falcon were a "recognition that American society was continuing to evolve, and that Captain America needed to evolve with it, if he hoped to survive".

Comics scholars Christopher Hayton and David Albright similarly argue that "The Strange Death of Captain America" was significant as a moment "of transition and uncertainty" for Captain America, as the character moved from his origins as a patriotic wartime hero to one who represented "the dichotomy that was developing in public consciousness between American ideals and American practice". Subsequent Captain America stories, such as "Secret Empire" (1974), would address this dichotomy directly.
