= Comic book death =

Term for a non-permanent character death

Cover to Uncanny X-Men #136 (August 1980, art by John Byrne), the penultimate issue of "The Dark Phoenix Saga". Jean Grey would sacrifice herself in the following issue, but Marvel later had the story retconned to allow Jean to appear in the new X-Factor series.

In the comic book fan community, the apparent death and subsequent return of a long-running character is often called a comic book death. A comic book death is generally not taken seriously by readers and is rarely permanent or meaningful other than for story or thematic purposes. The term is usually not applied to characters who have the ability to return from the dead as an established power or ability, such as Solomon Grundy or Ra's al Ghul.

== Context ==
Commenting on the impact and role of comic book character deaths, writer Geoff Johns said: "Death in superhero comics is cyclical in its nature, and that's for a lot of reasons, whether they are story reasons, copyright reasons, or fan reasons". The phenomenon of comic book death is particularly common for superhero characters. Writer Danny Fingeroth suggests that the nature of superheroes requires that they be both ageless and immortal.

A common expression regarding comic book death was once "No one stays dead except Bucky, Jason Todd, and Uncle Ben", referring to the seminal importance of those characters' deaths to the title character: Captain America's sidekick (retconned dead in 1964), Batman's second Robin (dead in 1988), and Spider-Man's uncle (dead since 1962), respectively. This long-held tenet was broken in 2005, when Jason Todd returned to life as the Red Hood and Bucky was retconned to have survived the accident that seemingly killed him, and brought back as the Winter Soldier who had remained in the shadows for decades. Uncle Ben also reappeared briefly thanks to Doctor Strange, as a way to reward to Peter Parker for helping stop Dormammu's revival, but he disappeared after speaking with Parker.

Because death in American super-hero comics is so often temporary, readers rarely take the death of a character seriously; when a character dies, readers feel very little sense of loss, and are simply left wondering how long it will be before they return to life.

== Notable examples ==
Although several comic book deaths are well-known, two of the best-known are the 1980 "death" of Jean Grey in Marvel's "Dark Phoenix Saga" and that of Superman in DC's highly publicized 1993 "Death of Superman" storyline. There is one major distinction between the two, however: whereas it was never intended that Superman's death be permanent, but rather that he would return to life at the conclusion of the story, Jean's passing was intended to be permanent, as the editor Jim Shooter felt that would be the only satisfactory outcome given that she had committed mass murder. Despite this, the story was retconned a few years later to facilitate Jean's return, with the rationale, that the Phoenix was never Jean Grey to begin with, but an exact duplicate of her while Jean was actually cocooned underwater at the floor of the body of water where Phoenix emerged until she was found and recovered by the Fantastic Four.

In 2007, the death of Captain America made real-world headlines when he met his apparent end, but Steve Rogers returned in Captain America: Reborn two years later in 2009.

Planters cited comic book deaths (particularly those adapted in the Marvel Cinematic Universe) as the inspiration for a storyline killing off its century-old mascot Mr. Peanut in January 2020 and having him reborn as a baby the next month.

An early prime time television version of this plot trope is in the 1970s original superhero series The Six Million Dollar Man after the 2-part episode "The Bionic Woman" produced spectacular ratings. With that unexpected success, the producers wanted to produce a spin-off series featuring the character despite the fact that Jaime Sommers was killed off on the operating table from bionic rejection at the story's conclusion. To do so, a story in the next season, "Return of the Bionic Woman"! was produced where Steve Austin discovers that Jaime had been placed in cryogenic freezing at another doctor's insistence after she was declared dead, which allowed her medical condition to be successfully treated enough to revive her, albeit without her memory of Steve Austin.

== In-universe acknowledgement ==
Sasquatch: Good guys do occasionally come back from the dead—though not as often as the bad guys...
Talisman: But that really only seems to happen to the big guns of the super hero biz—Captain America, the Sub-Mariner, people like them.

— Alpha Flight #23, June 1985

The Thing: But I thought you X-Men always come back from the dead!

— Fantastic Four #395, December 1994

She-Hulk: (Handling Charles Xavier's will) I know this is a delicate question and one I would not normally have to ask, but you are the X-Men and you don't do normal ... To the best of your knowledge, is Xavier really dead? I only ask because we both know that "dead" and "dead dead"...

— Uncanny X-Men vol. 3 #23 (September 2014)

Comic book characters themselves have made comments about the frequency of resurrections. Professor X has commented "in mutant heaven there are no pearly gates, but instead revolving doors". When Siryn was made aware of her father's death, she refused to mourn him, giddily claiming that since her father has died as an X-Man, he was likely going to be soon resurrected, shocking her friends. Her father is restored to life but is recruited by the Apocalypse Twins as part of their new Horsemen of Apocalypse.

Stating that he often pondered why superheroes return to life, Reed Richards said "it's almost proof of a higher power, of someone who needs us to live to stop what's coming. To fight the good fight". The obituary writer of the in-universe newspaper the Daily Bugle bemoaned to reporter Ben Urich about how many retractions he has had to write after each resurrection of a superhero or supervillain. In one issue of The Incredible Hercules, there is a betting game for then deceased superheroes to return to life.

== See also ==
- Soap opera, radio drama and television genre also known for such character deaths
- Retroactive continuity, related to comic book deaths
- Reset button technique, which likewise can reverse the death of a character
