= Fallen Son: The Death of Captain America =

Comic book series

- Cover art for Fallen Son: Death of Captain America – Captain America by John Romita Jr.

Publication information
- Publisher: Marvel Comics
- Format: Limited series
- Publication date: June 2007 – August 2007
- No. of issues: 5

Creative team
- Written by: Jeph Loeb
- Artist(s): Leinil Yu; Ed McGuinness; John Romita Jr. David Finch; John Cassaday

Fallen Son: The Death of Captain America is a 2007 comic book limited series dealing with various superheroes' reactions to the death of Captain America in the Marvel Comics universe after the Civil War.

The five-issue series is written by Jeph Loeb, with Leinil Yu, Ed McGuinness, John Romita Jr., David Finch, and John Cassaday each illustrating one of the issues.

== Background ==
J. Michael Straczynski conceived the premise for the series during a Marvel retreat in New York, and is credited for creating the initial concept. He suggested the structure of five issues, each based on Elisabeth Kübler-Ross' five stages of grief: denial, anger, bargaining, depression, and acceptance. Loeb lobbied hard to write the series, and succeeded, saying that he could draw upon his own experience of having lost his son Sam Loeb. In the Spring Preview issue of Wizard magazine, Loeb said:

When Straczynski [speaks] it's a little bit like the burning bush and the rest of us are Moses. He held up this yellow pad and said, 'It's the five stages of grief! Denial, anger, bargaining, depression, acceptance.' The theme of each issue is represented by a particular Marvel character and also ends with a transition phase leading into the following stage. Denial deals with Wolverine, Anger deals with the two Avengers teams (Mighty Avengers & New Avengers), Captain America himself is dealt with in Bargaining, Spider-Man is the focus of Depression and Iron Man comes under the spotlight in Acceptance.

== Plot ==
=== Issue #1 – Denial ===
Wolverine confronts the Winter Soldier about the improbability of Captain America dying from the gunshot wounds suffered at the court house; especially since both Captain America and Winter Soldier, the former Bucky, have both been thought to be dead at one time yet survived. Unable to get Winter Soldier to agree on a trip to S.H.I.E.L.D. Headquarters to see with their own eyes whether or not Cap is dead, Wolverine recruits the aid of Daredevil whose enhanced senses would enable him to sort out the truth from the deception. Using some enchantments created by Doctor Strange, the duo make their way into the main S.H.I.E.L.D. Helicarrier and to the holding cell of Crossbones, the man who made the first shot on Captain America. After a brief interrogation, Wolverine attempts to intimidate Crossbones into attacking him and therefore granting him an excuse to seek revenge but Daredevil refuses to allow it, stating that everything Crossbones told them was the truth.

As Daredevil departs, Wolverine makes his way to where S.H.I.E.L.D. is keeping Captain America's body to determine once and for all the truth of the matter, only to be confronted by Iron Man and Hank Pym. Wolverine looks inside the coffin and notices to his disgust that Cap's shield is missing; accusing Stark of planning to create a replacement. Although Pym attempts to detain him, Iron Man lets Wolverine go for the simple reason that he can tell the others that Steve Rogers, Captain America, is indeed dead. As he leaves, Wolverine warns Iron Man that if he learns that Stark had anything to do with Cap's death, he would kill him.

=== Issue #2 – Anger ===
As Wolverine and Daredevil infiltrate the S.H.I.E.L.D. Helicarrier, Iron Man contacts the Mighty Avengers who are en route to prevent the super-villain Tiger Shark from attacking a coastal missile base. Tiger Shark has stolen the so-called "Horn of Gabriel" from Atlantis, which can summon sea monsters to his side. During the fight, Tiger Shark boasts that he will finally gain the respect he deserves and a furious Ms. Marvel begins to savagely beat him until Namor arrives to calm the raging monsters. Condemning the brutality used by them against both Tiger Shark and the sea monsters as an outlet for their anger regarding Cap's death, Namor takes Tiger Shark into custody and reveals he learned there are missiles hidden in the coastline of Maine. As Namor warns the Mighty Avengers that he will retaliate if Atlantis is ever attacked, Ares asks Ms. Marvel if they won and if so then that was all that mattered.

Meanwhile, the Thing joins a poker game organized by the New Avengers along with Young Avengers Patriot and Hawkeye at the Sanctum Sanctorum. Tensions are running high and conversation soon turns to Cap's death and recent events caused by the Civil War. Sensing how close things are to boiling over, Patriot and Hawkeye leave the game to take out their frustration on some bad guys just as Wolverine returns from his quest aboard the S.H.I.E.L.D. Helicarrier. Wolverine informs the other Avengers that he saw Cap's body. Wolverine and Spider-Man get into a dispute, and The Thing separates them, then points out that fighting each other will not alleviate either of their pain regarding the loss of someone like Cap. Spider-Man leaves the game and Wolverine shadows him to make sure the webslinger gets home safe while the others decide to resume playing rather than discuss it any further.

=== Issue #3 – Bargaining ===
Clint Barton summons Tony Stark to the deserted old Avengers' Mansion and confronts him over the death of Steve Rogers. Stark then takes Barton into custody at the Helicarrier to confirm that he is, in fact, Clint Barton – back from the grave. Upon confirmation of his identity, Stark reveals Captain America's real shield and Barton has the chance to take the shield for a spin (literally) on the Helicarrier deck. When he proves he can handle it effectively, unlike others who have tried, Stark makes Barton an incredible offer: to restore Captain America to the people of the United States.

Stark takes Barton out on patrol and they discover Elijah Bradley and the new Hawkeye, Kate Bishop, defeating Firebrand. Stark confronts the duo about their violation of the Superhuman Registration Act to which Hawkeye replies by disabling Iron Man with an E.M.P. arrow. As Hawkeye and Patriot attempt to flee into the sewers, they find themselves approached by Barton as Captain America. Barton confronts Kate Bishop about her assumption of the Hawkeye mantle to which she claims that she did so to honor him but would never disgrace his memory by attempting to copy or replace him, as she and Patriot accuse Barton of trying to do with Captain America. As Stark's Iron Man armor reboots, Barton allows Patriot and Hawkeye to escape and he immediately returns the shield to Stark, realizing that Iron Man's desire to find a replacement Cap was more an attempt to alleviate Stark's own guilt over Rogers' death rather than the comfort of the American people. Barton promises to mail Stark back Rogers' costume and Iron Man vows to pursue Barton if he sides with the New Avengers. Barton does not reply, and Stark is left to stand alone in the rain.

=== Issue #4 – Depression ===
Spider-Man visits his Uncle Ben's grave, reflecting that while a true hero's legacy is judged by the lives he's saved, his will be judged by those he has lost; citing Uncle Ben, his parents, Harry Osborn, Gwen Stacy, her father, and now Captain America. He laments that although Uncle Ben told him that there would be 'days that would test him', he does not know if he can bear it anymore. Just then, his thoughts are interrupted by his spider-sense which alerts him to the presence of the Rhino. Believing that Rhino is somehow up to something, Spider-Man attacks him and in an attempt to defend himself, Rhino accidentally breaks his mother's headstone. As he reveals that he was only visiting his mother's grave, Spider-Man realizes his mistake but is too late to prevent Rhino from going into a rage. As Rhino proceeds to beat him to a pulp, Spider-Man recalls a time when he went against the Hulk and was nearly killed until Captain America came to his aid. Realizing he will not be saved this time, Spider-Man wills himself to his feet and defeats Rhino much in the same way Cap defeated the Hulk.

At that moment, Wolverine reveals himself and begrudgingly congratulates Spider-Man who brushes him off before heading to the Brooklyn Bridge where Gwen Stacy died. Wolverine follows him and an angry Spider-Man accuses him of being incapable of understanding what he's feeling. Wolverine then describes a condition like having a cannon shot through one's stomach, leaving a hole that has a tendency to reopen again and again, though the hole heals back faster each time it is reopened. Spider-Man asks if the pain ever goes away and Wolverine explains that you never 'get over' a death. You simply have to learn to live with the pain, and life will get better... someday.

=== Issue #5 – Acceptance ===
Captain America is given a funeral with full military honors (in a ceremony usually reserved for the president), and many thousands are in attendance, not to count the people watching on TV. Among the audience and speakers are Tony Stark, Sam Wilson, Hank Pym, Janet van Dyne, Ben Grimm, and a number of other heroes both old and modern, as well as their loved ones and the people Cap inspired. Tony is given the first opportunity to speak, but a wave of emotion renders him incapable of speaking anything besides "It wasn't supposed to be this way...". Sam then gets up and takes over, starting with a history of the names Cap was once called by, and pointing out that despite that, it was always Steve Rogers who really mattered. He speaks of how soldiers and heroes of yesteryear were inspired to be what they are simply by watching Cap in action. He asks them to stand up, and recounts the events that froze Cap and helped him survive to the modern day. He mentions—with emphasis on why he could not attend—how Namor was involved in bringing him back. Then he asks all those inspired by Cap's return to stand up as well, including heroes and those who supported the heroes. He references the New Avengers (not by name), who wanted to be there, but could not. At Doctor Strange's house, they are watching the funeral and discussing why they did not go; Spider-Man says it would have been worth the risk. Sam concludes by saying that with everyone in attendance proving they were inspired by Cap—since by this point literally everyone is standing—it should not be a sad day, but one of celebration of all the things Steve Rogers would have wanted.

Three days later, in the arctic, Iron Man, Wasp and Yellowjacket land in a S.H.I.E.L.D. ship with Rogers' casket. Tony mentions that the body in Arlington is not Cap's, but a decoy to please the public, and that this funeral would have been what Steve really wanted. The real body is here, and it will rest in the Arctic forever, the rationale being that he was preserved in peace here for decades until he could be revived, and so it was the best place for him to rest forever. Tony says a heartfelt good-bye, reflecting on their past together in the Avengers, and showing that despite their conflict during Civil War, he still cared for him. Namor appears, revealing that he too is touched by the death, and that as long as he rules the oceans, Steve Rogers will rest in peace. Janet then asks Tony whether everyone must now accept that the old era is finally over and a new one is beginning. The casket sinks slowly into nothingness without an answer.

== Other versions ==
=== What If? ===
An issue of Volume 7 What If? titled What If? Fallen Son asks "What if Iron Man died instead of Captain America?". It was released in December 2008. In this reality, Captain America never dies on the steps of the courthouse, and is tried as normal.

Shortly after a press conference detailing Steve Rogers' sentence, Tony Stark is attacked and killed by Tom Foster, blaming Stark for his uncle's death. This action seems to only help grow support of the Superhuman Registration Act, which leads Ms. Marvel to assault Luke Cage after he said he wished he could have gotten to Stark first.

With the superhero community, and the world, mourning the death of Tony Stark, the Skrulls descend towards an unsuspecting Earth to start their Invasion. As Uatu looks on at the Skrull ships headed towards Earth, he says "It wasn't supposed to be this way...".
