= The Death of Captain America =

Comic-book story arc published by Marvel Comics

- Cover of Captain America vol. 5, #25 (Apr 2007), art by Steve Epting
- Publisher: Marvel Comics
- Publication date: April 2007 – November 2008
- Genre: Superhero
- Title(s): Captain America vol. 5, #25–42
- Main character(s): Winter Soldier; Red Skull; Sharon Carter; Black Widow; Falcon; Tony Stark; Crossbones; Doctor Faustus; Arnim Zola; Grand Director; Sin

Creative team
- Writer: Ed Brubaker
- Artist(s): Steve Epting; Mike Perkins; Butch Guice; Roberto De La Torre; Luke Ross
- The Death of the Dream: ISBN 0-7851-2423-3
- The Burden of Dreams: ISBN 0785124241
- The Man Who Bought America: ISBN 0785129707

"The Death of Captain America", also known as "The Death of the Dream", is an eighteen-issue Captain America story arc written by Ed Brubaker with art by Steve Epting and published by Marvel Comics. The arc first appears in Captain America (vol. 5) #25–30. The first issue of the story arc, Captain America #25, was the highest selling comic for the month of its release. The story arc had wide-sweeping effects throughout the Marvel Universe and was accompanied by the miniseries Fallen Son: The Death of Captain America.

== Plot ==
Captain America's death. Art by Steve Epting.

In the aftermath of Civil War, Captain America is taken into S.H.I.E.L.D. custody, where he is assassinated by Crossbones and a brainwashed Sharon Carter per the order of the Red Skull. Overwhelmed with guilt, S.H.I.E.L.D. director Tony Stark and Black Widow hunt Captain America's murderers. Falcon, Captain America's old partner, follows his own leads to find the killers. Meanwhile, Bucky Barnes decides to kill Stark, blaming him for Captain America's death.

After receiving a letter written by Steve Rogers telling him that the Captain America legacy should continue, and look out for Bucky, Stark shows Bucky Barnes the letter and proposes to make him the new Captain America. Bucky agrees on the condition that he can be an independent agent who does not answer to Stark, S.H.I.E.L.D., or the Initiative. The Red Skull fakes the death of Aleksander Lukin, whose mind he inhabits, and begins using Kronas Corporation's vast holdings to economically cripple the United States before having S.H.I.E.L.D. agents brainwashed by Doctor Faustus open fire on protesters in front of the White House. The Red Skull continues his assault by engineering a riot via the placing of Kronas security troops and utilizing drugged water in a protest on the Lincoln Memorial. The Skull also kidnaps Sharon Carter, who now knows that she is pregnant with Steve Rogers' child.

All of the Red Skull's actions benefit his puppet politician, Gordon Wright, who quickly becomes a popular third-party presidential candidate. Once elected, Wright will lead the country into a police state secretly controlled by the Red Skull.

The Skull also plans to transfer his consciousness into Sharon's unborn child, apparently sired by Steve Rogers himself and potentially having inherited his Project Rebirth enhancements.

== Collected editions ==
The story arc is collected in three trade paperbacks and one Marvel Omnibus:

- Captain America: The Death of Captain America, Vol. 1 – The Death of the Dream (ISBN 0785124233)
- Captain America: The Death of Captain America, Vol. 2 – The Burden of Dreams (ISBN 0785124241)
- Captain America: The Death of Captain America, Vol. 3 – The Man Who Bought America (ISBN 0785129707)
- Captain America: The Death of Captain America Omnibus (ISBN 0785138064)

== Reception ==
Captain America #25 which depicted Steve Rogers' death was the highest selling comic of March 2007 with preorder sales of 290,514, double the sales of the Mighty Avengers #1 in the same period. The death of Captain America was reported in ABC News, by reporter Bryan Robinson.

== Novel ==
The storyline was adapted into a novel by comics writer Larry Hama in March 2014 to tie in the release of Captain America: The Winter Soldier and features Sharon Carter, Bucky Barnes, Black Widow, and Falcon as central characters.

== See also ==
- Fallen Son: The Death of Captain America
- Civil War
- Captain America: Reborn
