= Luke Ross =

Brazilian comic artist

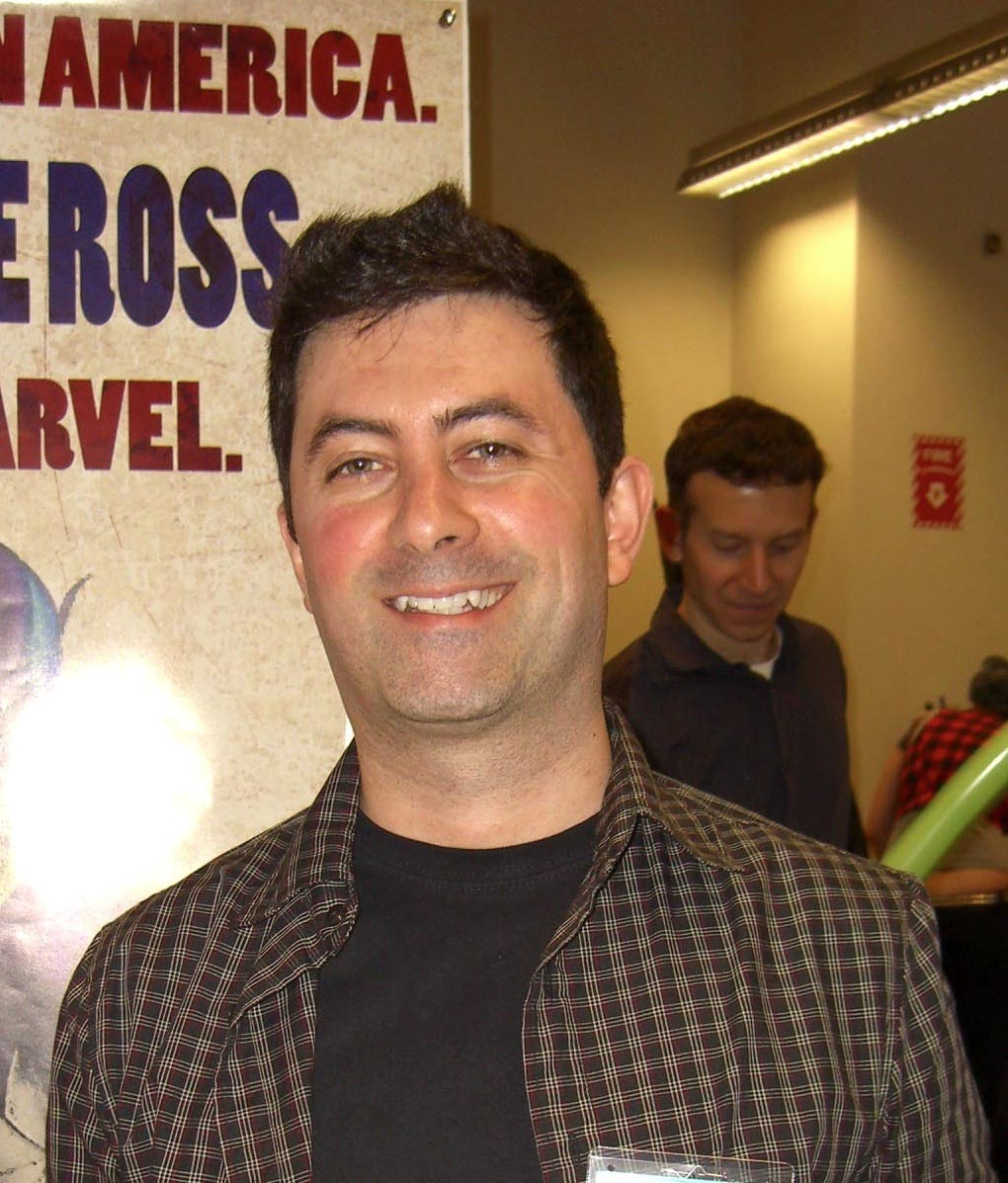
- Born: Luciano Queiroz; July 18, 1972 (age 54) São Paulo, Brazil
- Areas: Penciller, Inker, Colourist
- Notable works: Gen13; Spider-Man; Green Lantern; Indiana Jones; Captain America

Luke Ross (born Luciano Queiroz, 18 July 1972) is a comic artist known for his work on books such as Gen13, Spider-Man, Green Lantern, Indiana Jones and Captain America.
