= Captain America (vol. 5) =

2005–2009 comic book series

- Cover to Captain America (vol. 5) #25 ("The Death of Captain America: The Death of the Dream Part One"). Art by Steve Epting.

Publication information
- Publisher: Marvel Comics
- Schedule: Monthly
- Format: Ongoing series
- Genre: Superhero
- Publication date: January 2005 – July 2009
- No. of issues: 50
- Main character: Captain America

Creative team
- Written by: Ed Brubaker
- Artist(s): Steve Epting, Michael Lark, Mike Perkins, Butch Guice, Luke Ross
- Colorist: Frank D'Armata

Captain America (vol. 5) was an ongoing comic book series published from January 2005 to July 2009 by Marvel Comics. It starred the superhero Captain America, and was written by Ed Brubaker. It was the fifth Captain America series with this title to be published, following series that ran from 1968–1996, 1996–1997, 1998–2002, and 2002–2004. After its fiftieth issue (July 2009), the series was renumbered to match the numbering of all the volumes of the title (454, 13, 50, 32, and 50), and volume 1 resumed publication with issue #600, with Brubaker remaining as writer.

The series is notable for reviving Captain America's World War II partner Bucky Barnes as the Winter Soldier in issue #6, the presumed death of Steve Rogers in issue #25, and Bucky taking over the mantle of Captain America in issue #34.

== History ==
Captain America vol. 5 ran from Jan. 2005 – Aug. 2011. Beginning with the 600th overall issue (Aug. 2009), Captain America resumed its original numbering, as if the series numbering had continued uninterrupted after #454.

As part of the aftermath of Marvel Comics' company-crossover storyline "Civil War", Steve Rogers was ostensibly killed in Captain America vol. 5, #25 (March 2007). Series writer Ed Brubaker remarked, "What I found is that all the really hard-core left-wing fans want Cap to be standing out on and giving speeches on the street corner against the George W. Bush administration, and all the really right-wing fans all want him to be over in the streets of Baghdad, punching out Saddam Hussein." The character's co-creator, Joe Simon, said, "It's a hell of a time for him to go. We really need him now." Artist Alex Ross designed a slightly revised Captain America costume that former sidekick Bucky Barnes began to wear as the new Captain America in vol. 5, #34 (March 2008). As of 2007, an estimated 210 million copies of "Captain America" comic books had been sold in 75 countries.

The storyline of Rogers' return began in issue #600.

== Story arcs ==
- "Out of Time" (#1-6)
- "Interlude: The Lonesome Death of Jack Monroe" (#7)
- "The Winter Soldier" (#8-9 & 11-14)
- "House of M" (#10)
- "Red is the Darkest Color" (#15)
- "Collision Courses" (#16-17)
- "Twenty-First Century Blitz" (#18-21)
- "The Drums of War" (#22-24)
- "The Death of Captain America" (#25-42)
  - "Act One: The Death of the Dream" (#25-30)
  - "Act Two: The Burden of Dreams" (#31-36)
  - "Act Three: The Man Who Bought America" (#37-42)
- "Time's Arrow" (#43-45)
- "Old Friends and Enemies" (#46-48)
- "The Daughter of Time" (#49)
- "Days Gone By" (#50)

== One-shots ==
In addition to the regular series, two one-shot issues written by Ed Brubaker were published in coordination with ongoing stories.

- Captain America 65th Anniversary Special (May 2006) follows up issues 15-17.
- Winter Soldier: Winter Kills (February 2007) takes place at the same time as issues 22-24.

== Creators ==
=== Writer ===
- Ed Brubaker, #1-50

=== Artists ===
- Steve Epting, #1-6, #8, #11-14, #18-21, #25-34, #37-38, #40-42, and #46
- Michael Lark, #2-5, #9, and #12
- John Paul Leon, #7
- Lee Weeks, #10
- Mike Perkins, #15-17, #22-24, #26-30, and #36
- Jackson Guice, #35-36, #45, and #47-48
- Roberto de la Torre, #39
- Luke Ross, #42-45 and #48-50

== Collected editions ==
- Captain America: Winter Soldier Volume 1 (#1-7) ISBN 978-0785116516
- Captain America: Winter Soldier Volume 2 (#8-9 & 11-14) ISBN 978-0785119210
- House of M: World of M Featuring Wolverine (#10 and other House of M tie ins) ISBN 978-0785119227
- Captain America: Red Menace Volume 1 (#15-17 and Captain America 65th Anniversary Special) ISBN 978-0785123217
- Captain America: Red Menace Volume 2 (#18-21) ISBN 978-0785122258
- Civil War: Captain America (#22-24 and Winter Soldier: Winter Kills) ISBN 978-0785127987
- Captain America: The Death of Captain America Volume 1: The Death of the Dream (#25-30) ISBN 978-0785124238
- Captain America: The Death of Captain America Volume 2: The Burden of Dreams (#31-36) ISBN 978-0785128502
- Captain America: The Death of Captain America Volume 3: The Man Who Bought America (#37-42) ISBN 978-0785129714
- Captain America: The Man With No Face (#43-48) ISBN 978-0785131533
- Captain America: Road to Reborn (#49-50 and volume 1 #600-601) ISBN 978-0785141754
- Captain America: Two Americas (#602-605 and Captain America: Who Will Wield the Shield?) ISBN 978-0785145103
- Captain America: No Escape (#606-610) ISBN 978-0785145127
- Captain America: The Trial of Captain America (#611-615 & 615.1) ISBN 978-0785151197
- Captain America: Prisoner of War (#616-619) ISBN 978-0785151227

=== Ultimate Collections ===
- Captain America: Winter Soldier Ultimate Collection (#1-9 & 11-14) ISBN 978-0785143413
- Captain America: Red Menace Ultimate Collection (#15-21 and Captain America 65th Anniversary Special) ISBN 978-0785156178
- Captain America: The Death of Captain America Ultimate Collection (#22-42 and Winter Soldier: Winter Kills) ISBN 978-0785183792

=== Marvel Omnibus ===
- Captain America Omnibus Volume 1 (#1-25, Captain America 65th Anniversary Special, and Winter Soldier: Winter Kills) ISBN 9780785128663
- Captain America Omnibus Volume 2: The Death of Captain America (#25-42) ISBN 978-0785138068
- Captain America Omnibus Volume 3: Captain America Lives! (#43-50, volume 1 #600-601, and Captain America: Reborn #1-6) ISBN 978-0785145141
- Captain America Omnibus Volume 4: The Trial of Captain America ("Captain America: Who Will Wield The Shield? 1", volume 1 #602-610, Steve Rogers: Super Soldier #1-4, volume 1 # 611-619, 615.1, and Captain America (2011) #1-10) ISBN 978-0785192725
- Captain America Omnibus Volume 5: Return of the Winter Soldier (Captain America and Bucky #620-628, Fear Itself 7.1: Captain America, Winter Soldier #1-5, Captain America (2011) #11-19, Winter Soldier #6-14) ISBN 978-0785192718
