= Crossbones (character) =

Marvel Comics fictional character

Brock Rumlow Crossbones
- Crossbones as seen in Captain America and Crossbones #1. Art by Greg Tocchini.

Publication information
- Publisher: Marvel Comics
- First appearance: Cameo: Captain America #359 (October 1989); Full appearance: Captain America #360 (October 1989); Named: Captain America #362 (November 1989)
- Created by: Mark Gruenwald (writer); Kieron Dwyer (artist)

In-story information
- Alter ego: Brock Rumlow
- Team affiliations: Thunderbolts; Hydra; Skeleton Crew; Assassins Guild
- Partnerships: Red Skull; Sin
- Notable aliases: Bingo Brock; Frag; Mr. Bones
- Abilities: Skilled military tactician; Expert hand-to-hand combatant, martial artist and marksman; Enhanced strength, stamina, durability, and reflexes

Crossbones (Brock Rumlow) is a supervillain appearing in American comic books published by Marvel Comics.

In his comic book appearances, Crossbones is depicted as a mercenary who is often employed by other villains such as the Red Skull and Hydra. He serves as one of the most enduring adversaries of Captain America, and even played a part in his assassination in the aftermath of the superhero Civil War. A black-and-white skull mask and an insignia on his chest symbolic of his namesake serve as Crossbones' visual motif.

Crossbones has been adapted in various media incarnations, having been portrayed in live-action by Frank Grillo in the Marvel Cinematic Universe films Captain America: The Winter Soldier (2014), Captain America: Civil War (2016) and Avengers: Endgame (2019). Grillo also voiced alternate versions of the character in the Disney+ animated series What If...?

== Publication history ==
Created by Mark Gruenwald and Kieron Dwyer, the character first made a cameo appearance in Captain America #359 (October 1989), before he was fully introduced later that month in issue #360 and his name was revealed in issue #362 (November 1989).

== Fictional character biography ==
Young Brock Rumlow led the Savage Crims gang on New York City's Lower East Side. After he brutalized fifteen-year-old Rachel Leighton, two of her brothers assaulted Rumlow and he killed them. Rumlow fled, entering the Taskmaster's school for criminals, and within three years he became an instructor there under the name Bingo Brock.

As a mercenary, Rumlow enlisted with Albert Malik in Algeria, serving him as Frag until he was sent to invade Arnim Zola's Switzerland chateau. Ultimately the only team member to survive the assault, Rumlow met and impressed Red Skull, who accepted Brock’s services and codenamed him "Crossbones".

The Red Skull sends Crossbones to observe Helmut Zemo's progress acquiring the Bloodstone fragments and to obtain them. Crossbones stows away aboard Captain America's flagship and enters Zemo's ship to steal the Bloodstone fragments. Crossbones is forced to shatter the Bloodstone fragments when the Hellfire Helix uses it to take control of Heinrich Zemo's body; the destruction of the Bloodstone discorporates the Hellfire Helix. Knowing that his employer would be infuriated by the Bloodstone's loss, Crossbones kidnaps Rachel Leighton (now Diamondback). He challenges Captain America to retrieve Diamondback, but the Captain defeated him, although Diamondback escaped, and the Red Skull ordered Crossbones to desist and return to headquarters.

Crossbones assembles the Skeleton Crew from the Red Skull's henchmen and led them on a search for the Red Skull, who had been missing since Magneto imprisoned him in an underground bunker. Crossbones is fired for questioning the Red Skull's alliance with Viper. Desperate to regain his position as leader of the Skeleton Crew, Crossbones kidnaps Diamondback. The two are captured and imprisoned, with Red Skull rehiring Crossbones on a temporary basis.

At the start of the "Heroic Age" event, Crossbones joins the new Thunderbolts team formed in the aftermath of Norman Osborn's siege of Asgard. Government agents, working with Luke Cage, add Crossbones to the team knowing that he cannot be reformed, hoping that his extreme methods will alienate the other Thunderbolt members and push them towards rehabilitation. During the team's first mission, Crossbones was exposed to corrupted Terrigen Mist. Crossbones manifests the ability to fire a powerful, piercing beam of energy from his face, which is theorized to have originated from his exposure to the Mist. Crossbones is discharged from the Thunderbolts after killing a police officer and apparently loses his powers.

During the "Devil's Reign" storyline, Crossbones appears as a member of Mayor Wilson Fisk's Thunderbolts.

== Powers and abilities ==
An expert combatant trained in warfare, Crossbones is an accomplished military tactician, and is thus able to formulate strategies on the battlefield. He also has extensive training in martial arts, street-fighting, marksmanship, and various forms of hand-to-hand combat. He once served as a student at the Taskmaster's school for criminals before becoming an instructor there. Physically, Crossbones is tall and muscular, but athletic and dextrous. In addition, he is proficient in the use of various weapons, such as guns, bows, and throwing knives. One of Crossbones' primary weapons is the spring-loaded stiletto blade housed in his gauntlets. He also has experience with torture and brainwashing, having effectively "reprogrammed" Sin, and nearly so with Diamondback.

As a member of the Thunderbolts, Crossbones was exposed to corrupted Terrigen Mists during a mission, and shortly after manifested the ability to generate a circle of energy in front of his face which could fire energy beams capable of piercing and burning targets. The ability developed to the point where flames engulfed the entirety of his head while still allowing him to fire focused energy beams. Crossbones is not impervious to the flames he generates.

== Other versions ==
=== Heroes Reborn ===
An alternate universe version of Crossbones appears in Heroes Reborn as an enforcer for the Red Skull and Master Man's World Party.

=== House of M ===
An alternate universe version of Crossbones appears in House of M as a member of the Hood's Masters of Evil.

=== Marvel 2099 ===
In the unified Marvel 2099 reality of Earth-2099, Brock Rumlow has been long dead. He is reanimated as a cyborg zombie and begins working for the Cabal.

=== Ultimate Marvel ===
An alternate universe version of Crossbones appears in the Ultimate Marvel imprint. This version is a teenager and member of the Serpent Skulls gang.

== In other media ==
=== Television ===
- Crossbones appears in Avengers Assemble, voiced by Fred Tatasciore.
- Crossbones appears in Ultimate Spider-Man, voiced again by Fred Tatasciore.
- Crossbones appears in Spider-Man, voiced again by Fred Tatasciore.
- Crossbones appears in Marvel Disk Wars: The Avengers, voiced by Masato Obara in the Japanese version and by Wally Wingert in the English dub.
- Crossbones appears in Marvel Future Avengers, voiced again by Masato Obara in the Japanese version and again by Fred Tatasciore in the English dub.
- Crossbones appears in Lego Marvel Avengers: Loki in Training, voiced by Giles Panton.

=== Marvel Cinematic Universe ===
Frank Grillo as Brock Rumlow / Crossbones in Captain America: Civil War (2016)

Frank Grillo portrays Brock Rumlow / Crossbones in the Marvel Cinematic Universe (MCU).

- The character is introduced in Captain America: The Winter Soldier (2014) as the field commander of S.T.R.I.K.E.
- Rumlow returns in Captain America: Civil War (2016) as the mercenary Crossbones.
- An alternate timeline version of Rumlow appears in Avengers: Endgame (2019).
- Alternate timeline versions of Rumlow appear in the Disney+ animated series What If...?.

=== Video games ===
- Crossbones appears as a boss in Captain America and the Avengers.
- Crossbones appears as a playable character in Lego Marvel's Avengers, voiced by Darren O'Hare. Additionally, the MCU incarnation of Brock Rumlow is also playable, initially in his S.T.R.I.K.E. uniform before his Crossbones design was added later via DLC.
- Crossbones appears in Marvel Avengers Academy.
- Crossbones appears in Marvel Heroes.
- Crossbones appears in Marvel Contest of Champions.
- Crossbones appears as a playable character in Marvel Strike Force.
- Crossbones appears as a playable character in Marvel: Future Fight.
- Crossbones appears as a boss in Marvel's Avengers via the "War for Wakanda" DLC, voiced again by Fred Tatasciore.
- Crossbones appears in Marvel's Midnight Suns, voiced by Rick D. Wasserman.
