= Captain America =

Marvel Comics superhero

Steve Rogers Captain America
- Captain America by Joe Jusko, as seen on the variant cover for Captain America: Steve Rogers #11 (February 2017)

Publication information
- Publisher: Marvel Comics (Note: Formerly Timely Comics and Atlas Comics)
- First appearance: Captain America Comics #1 (December 20, 1940) (Note: Cover dated as March 1941)
- Created by: Joe Simon; Jack Kirby

In-story information
- Full name: Steven Rogers
- Species: Human mutate
- Place of origin: New York City
- Team affiliations: Avengers; All-Winners Squad; Invaders; S.H.I.E.L.D.; U.S. Army
- Partnerships: Bucky Barnes; Sam Wilson; Sharon Carter
- Notable aliases: Nomad, The Captain
- Abilities: Enhanced to peak human physical perfection by the Super-Soldier Serum; Master martial artist and hand-to-hand combatant; Master tactician and strategist; Wields a virtually indestructible shield

Captain America is a superhero created by Joe Simon and Jack Kirby who appears in American comic books published by Marvel Comics. The character first appeared in Captain America Comics #1, published on December 20, 1940, by Timely Publications, a corporate predecessor to Marvel. Captain America's civilian identity is Steven "Steve" Rogers, a frail man rejected by the United States Army for physical unfitness who is enhanced to the peak of human physical perfection by an experimental "super-soldier serum". Equipped with an American flag–inspired costume and a virtually indestructible shield, Captain America and his sidekick Bucky Barnes clashed frequently with the villainous Red Skull and other agents of the Axis powers amid World War II. In the war's final days, an accident left Captain America frozen in a state of suspended animation until he was revived in modern times. He resumes his exploits as a costumed hero and becomes a leader of the superhero team the Avengers, while frequently struggling as a "man out of time" to adjust to the new era.

The character quickly emerged as Timely's most popular and commercially successful creation of the Golden Age of Comic Books, though the popularity of superheroes declined in the post-war period and Captain America Comics was discontinued in 1950. The character saw a short-lived revival in 1953 before returning to comics in 1964 and has since remained in continuous publication. Captain America's creation as an explicitly anti-Nazi figure was a deliberately political undertaking, inspired by Simon and Kirby's strong opposition to Nazi Germany and its supporters in the United States. Political messages have subsequently remained a defining feature of Captain America stories, with writers regularly using the character to comment on the state of American society and government.

Having appeared in more than ten thousand stories, Captain America is one of the most popular and recognized Marvel Comics characters, and has been described as an icon of American popular culture. Though Captain America was not the first United States–themed superhero, he would become the most popular and enduring of the many patriotic American superheroes created during World War II. Captain America was the first Marvel character to appear in a medium outside of comic books, in the 1944 movie serial Captain America; the character has subsequently appeared in a variety of films and other media, including the Marvel Cinematic Universe, where he is portrayed by actor Chris Evans.

== Publication history ==
=== Creation and development ===
"It was a time of deep passion. Hitler was grabbing all of Europe, we had Nazis in America, Nazis holding mass meetings in Madison Square Garden. [...] Captain America was created in that atmosphere, he was a natural outgrowth of the passionate mood of the country."

— Jack Kirby

Accounts of Captain America's creation are not entirely consistent, (Note: Stan Lee's telling of Captain America's creation in his 1947 book Secrets Behind the Comics solely names Martin Goodman and does not explicitly name Joe Simon or Jack Kirby, an account that has been interpreted as attempting to deny Simon and Kirby credit for the character entirely.) but it is generally accepted that in 1940, Timely Comics publisher Martin Goodman responded to the growing popularity of superhero comics – particularly Superman at rival publisher National Comics Publications, the corporate predecessor to DC Comics – by asking editor Joe Simon to create a new patriotic wartime superhero to add to Timely's existing superhero line. According to Simon, he began to develop the character by determining who his nemesis could be and, noting that the most successful superheroes were defined by their relationship with a compelling villain, eventually settled on Adolf Hitler. He rationalized that Hitler was the "best villain of them all" as he was "hated by everyone in the free world", and that it would be a unique approach for a superhero to face a real-life adversary rather than a fictional one. According to Simon's recollections, he sought to have Jack Kirby be the primary artist on the series: the two developed a working relationship and friendship in the late 1930s after working together at Fox Feature Syndicate, and had previously developed characters for Timely together.

Captain America's development as an explicitly anti-Nazi character was intentionally political: though the United States had not yet entered the war, Goodman's superhero line had already taken a strong anti-Nazi stance, and Simon and Kirby were similarly opposed to the actions of Nazi Germany and its domestic supporters. Simon claimed that he worked out the details of the character, who was eventually named "Captain America", after he completed sketches in consultation with Goodman. Simon stated that he initially considered "Super American" for the hero's name, but felt there were already multiple comic book characters with "super" in their names. The hero's civilian name "Steve Rogers" was derived from the telegraphy term "roger", meaning "message received".

Goodman elected to launch Captain America with his own self-titled comic book, making him the first Timely character to debut with his own ongoing series without having first appeared in an anthology. Despite Simon's wishes to have Kirby as sole artist, Goodman wanted a team of artists on the series in order to rush the first issue to publication, expressing concern that Hitler might be killed before the first issue could reach the newsstands. Ultimately Kirby did serve as penciller, working from Simon's roughly sketched layouts of figures and backgrounds. Inking of Kirby's pencils has been attributed to Al Avison and Al Gabriele, although Simon himself says the book was inked by cartoonist Al Liederman. Simon additionally negotiated a 25 percent share of the profits for the comic: 15% for himself, and 10% for the artists.

=== Debut and early success (early 1940s) ===
Cover of Captain America Comics #1 (December 1940, cover dated March 1941). Art by Joe Simon and Jack Kirby.

Captain America Comics #1 was published on December 20, 1940, with a cover date of March 1941. While the front cover of the issue featured Captain America punching Hitler, the comic itself established the Red Skull as Captain America's primary adversary, and also introduced Bucky Barnes as Captain America's teenaged sidekick. Simon stated that he personally regarded Captain America's origin story, in which the frail Steve Rogers becomes a supersoldier after receiving an experimental serum, as "the weakest part of the character", and that he and Kirby "didn't put too much thought into the origin. We just wanted to get to the action." Kirby designed the series' action scenes with an emphasis on a sense of continuity across panels, saying that he "choreographed" the sequences as one would a ballet, with a focus on exaggerated character movement. Kirby's layouts in Captain America Comics are characterized by their distorted perspectives, irregularly shaped panels, and the heavy use of speed lines.

The first issue of Captain America Comics sold out in a matter of days, and the second issue's print run was set at over one million copies. Captain America quickly became Timely's most popular character, with the publisher creating an official Captain America fan club called the "Sentinels of Liberty". (Note: Members of the Sentinels of Liberty received a membership card and a metal Captain America badge in exchange for a ten cent membership fee, though badge distribution was later discontinued due to wartime salvage efforts; Timely instead began to match all ten cent donations made to US Department of War.) Circulation figures remained close to a million copies per month after the debut issue, which outstripped even the circulation of news magazines such as Time during the same period. Captain America Comics was additionally one of 189 periodicals that the US Department of War deemed appropriate to distribute to its soldiers without prior screening. The character would also make appearances in several of Timely's other comic titles, including All Winners Comics, Marvel Mystery Comics, U.S.A. Comics, and All Select Comics.

Though Captain America was not the first United States-themed superhero – a distinction that belongs to The Shield at MLJ Comics – he would become the most popular patriotic American superhero of those created during World War II. Captain America's popularity drew a complaint from MLJ that the character's triangular heater shield too closely resembled the chest symbol of The Shield. This prompted Goodman to direct Simon and Kirby to change the design beginning with Captain America Comics #2. The revised round shield went on to become an iconic element of the character; its use as a discus-like throwing weapon originated in a short prose story in Captain America Comics #3, written by Stan Lee in his professional debut as a writer. Timely's publication of Captain America Comics led the company to be targeted with threatening letters and phone calls from the German American Bund, an American Nazi organization. When members began loitering on the streets outside the company's office, police protection was posted and New York mayor Fiorello La Guardia personally contacted Simon and Kirby to guarantee the safety of the publisher's employees.

Simon wrote the first two issues of Captain America Comics before becoming the editor for the series; they were the only Captain America stories he would ever directly write. While Captain America generated acclaim and industry fame for Simon and Kirby, the pair believed that Goodman was withholding the promised percentage of profits for the series, prompting Simon to seek employment for himself and Kirby at National Comics Publications. When Goodman learned of Simon and Kirby's intentions, he effectively fired them from Timely Comics, telling them they were to leave the company after they completed work on Captain America Comics #10. The authorship of Captain America Comics was subsequently assumed by a variety of individuals, including Otto Binder, Bill Finger, and Manly Wade Wellman as writers, and Al Avison, Vince Alascia, and Syd Shores as pencilers.

=== Decline in popularity (mid-1940s and 1950s) ===
Superhero comics began to decline in popularity in the post-war period. This prompted a variety of attempts to reposition Captain America, including having the character fight gangsters rather than wartime enemies in Captain America Comics #42 (October 1944), having Steve Rogers become a high school teacher after getting out of the army beginning in Captain America Comics #59 (August 1946), and joining Timely's first superhero team, the All-Winners Squad, in All Winners Comics #19 (Fall 1946). The series nevertheless continued to face dwindling sales, and Captain America Comics ended with its 75th issue in February 1950. Horror comics were ascendant as a popular comic genre during this period; in keeping with the trend, the final two issues of Captain America Comics were published under the title Captain America's Weird Tales.

Timely's corporate successor Atlas Comics relaunched the character in 1953 in Young Men #24, where a new Captain America story appears alongside stories reviving two of Timely's other popular wartime heroes, the Human Torch and the Sub-Mariner. It was followed by a revival of Captain America Comics in 1954 drawn primarily by John Romita. In the spirit of the Cold War and McCarthyism, the character was billed as "Captain America, Commie Smasher" and faced enemies associated with the Soviet Union. The series was a commercial failure, and was cancelled after just three issues. Romita attributed the series' failure to the changing political climate, particularly the public opposition to the Korean War; the character subsequently fell out of active publication for nearly a decade, with Romita noting that "for a while, 'Captain America' was a dirty word".

=== Return to comics (1960s) ===
Cover of The Avengers #4 (March 1964). Art by Jack Kirby and George Roussos.

Captain America made his ostensible return in the anthology Strange Tales #114 (November 1963), published by Atlas' corporate successor Marvel Comics. In an 18-page story written by Lee and illustrated by Kirby, (Note: Kirby returned to the company as a freelancer in 1956.) Captain America apparently reemerges following years of retirement, only to be revealed as an impostor who is defeated by Human Torch of the Fantastic Four. A caption in the final panel indicates that the story was a "test" to gauge interest in a potential return for Captain America; the reader response to the story was enthusiastic and the character was formally reintroduced in The Avengers #4 (March 1964).

The Avengers #4 retroactively established that Captain America had fallen into the Atlantic Ocean in the final days of World War II, where he spent decades frozen in ice in a state of suspended animation before being found and recovered. (Note: This revised backstory did not acknowledge stories set in the post-war period that had featured the character. These depictions would later be retconned as individuals who were not Steve Rogers assuming the role of Captain America; the 1950s "Commie Smasher" incarnation of the character, for example, was retconned as the villainous William Burnside in the 1970s.) Captain America solo stories written by Lee with Kirby as the primary penciller were published in the anthology Tales of Suspense alongside solo stories focused on fellow Avengers member Iron Man beginning in November 1964; the character also appeared in one issue of Lee and Kirby's World War II-set Sgt. Fury and his Howling Commandos in December that same year. These runs introduced and retroactively established several new companions of Captain America, including Nick Fury, Peggy Carter, and Sharon Carter. To keep stories consistent across Marvel's universe, Lee replaced the Avengers lineup in The Avengers #16, leaving Captain America to lead Hawkeye, Quicksilver, and Scarlet Witch. For the same reason, Captain America's solo stories in Tales of Suspense focused exclusively on his time in World War II.

In 1966, Joe Simon sued Marvel Comics, asserting that he was legally entitled to renew the copyright on the character upon the expiration of the original 28-year term. The two parties settled out of court, with Simon agreeing to a statement that the character had been created under terms of employment by the publisher, and was therefore work for hire owned by the company.

Captain America's self-titled ongoing series was relaunched in April 1968, with Lee as writer and Kirby as penciller. In 1969, Jim Steranko drew and co-authored with Stan Lee a three-issue run of Captain America. Despite the brevity of Steranko's time on the series, his contributions significantly influenced how Captain America was represented in post-war comics, reestablishing the character's secret identity and introducing a more experimental art style to the series. After Steranko departed the series, John Romita Sr. and John Buscema filled in on individual issues until Gene Colan became the regular artist, with Lee continuing as scripter.

=== Political shifts (1970s) ===
"This was the '70s – prime anti-war years – and here was a guy with a flag on his chest who was supposed to represent what most people distrusted. No one knew what to do with him."

— Steve Englehart

In contrast to the character's enthusiastic participation in World War II, comics featuring Captain America rarely broached the topic of the Vietnam War, though the subject of Captain America's potential participation was frequently debated by readers in the letters to the editor section in Captain America. Marvel maintained a position of neutrality on Vietnam; in 1971, Stan Lee wrote in an editorial that an informal poll indicated that a majority of readers did not want Captain America to be involved in Vietnam, adding that he believed the character "simply doesn't lend himself to the John Wayne-type character he once was" and that he could not "see any of our characters taking on a role of super-patriotism in the world as it is today".

Captain America stories in the 1970s began to increasingly focus on domestic American political issues, such as poverty, racism, pollution, and political corruption. (Note: This shift was enabled by a change to the Comics Code Authority in 1971; the code had previously prohibited "respected institutions" from being "presented in such a way as to create disrespect for established authority", but was revised to permit depictions of illegal acts by these institutions so long as the individual responsible was made to "pay the legal price" and the act itself was "declared as an exceptional case".) Captain America #117 (September 1969) introduced The Falcon as the first African-American superhero in mainstream comic books and he later became Captain America's partner; the series was cover titled as Captain America and the Falcon beginning February 1971, a title it would maintain for the next seven and a half years. These political shifts were particularly manifested in comics created by writer Steve Englehart and artist Sal Buscema, who joined the series in 1972. In a 1974 storyline written by Englehart directly inspired by the Watergate scandal, Captain America is framed for murder by the fascistic Secret Empire, whose leader is ultimately revealed to be the president of the United States. The incident causes a disillusioned Steve Rogers to briefly drop the moniker of Captain America to become "Nomad, the man without a country", though he later vowed to "reclaim the ideals of America, which its leaders have trampled upon" and again assumed the role of Captain America. Englehart and Buscema's run was highly acclaimed, bringing Captain America from one of Marvel's lowest-selling titles to its top-selling comic, and the conflict between America as it idealizes itself to be and America in reality would recur frequently as a theme in Captain America comics in the subsequent decades.

In 1975, Roy Thomas created the comic book series The Invaders. Set during World War II, the comic focuses on a team composed of Timely's wartime-era superheroes, prominently including Captain America; Thomas, a fan of superhero stories from the Golden Age of Comic Books, drew inspiration for the series from Timely's All-Winners Squad. Jack Kirby returned to the character in the mid-'seventies, editing, writing and illustrating Captain America and the Falcon from 1975 to 1977. He was then followed by a number of writers and artists, including writers Roy Thomas, Donald F. Glut, Roger McKenzie, Steve Gerber and artist Sal Buscema; the series was also re-titled Captain America beginning with issue 223 in 1978.

=== Post-Vietnam and "Heroes Reborn" (1980s and 1990s) ===
Owing to the series' lack of a regular writer, Captain America editor Roger Stern and artist John Byrne authored the series from 1980 to 1981. Their run saw a storyline in which Captain America declines an offer to run for president of the United States. Following Stern and Byrne, Captain America was authored by writer J.M. DeMatteis and artist Mike Zeck from 1981 to 1984. Their run featured a year-long storyline in which Captain America faced a crisis of confidence in the face of what DeMatteis described as "Reagan Cold War rhetoric". The story was originally planned to culminate in Captain America #300 with Captain America renouncing violence to become a pacifist; when that ending was rejected by Marvel editor-in-chief Jim Shooter, DeMatteis resigned from Captain America in protest.

Writer Mark Gruenwald, editor of Captain America from 1982 to 1985, served as writer on the series from 1985 to 1995. Various artists illustrated the series over the course of Gruenwald's decade-long run, including Paul Neary from 1985 to 1987, and Kieron Dwyer from 1988 to 1990. In contrast to DeMatteis, Gruenwald placed less emphasis on Steve Rogers' life as a civilian, wishing to show "that Steve Rogers is Captain America first [...] he has no greater needs than being Captain America." Among the most significant storylines appearing in Gruenwald's run was "The Choice" in 1987, in which Steve Rogers renounces the identity of Captain America to briefly become simply "The Captain" after the United States government orders him to continue his superheroic activities directly under their control.

After Gruenwald departed the series, writer Mark Waid and artist Ron Garney began to author Captain America in 1995. Despite early acclaim, including the reintroduction of Captain America's love interest Sharon Carter, their run was terminated after ten issues as a result of Marvel's "Heroes Reborn" rebranding in 1996. The rebrand saw artists Jim Lee and Rob Liefeld, who had left the company in the early 1990s to establish Image Comics, return to Marvel to re-imagine several of the company's characters. Marvel faced various financial difficulties in the 1990s, culminating in the company filing for Chapter 11 bankruptcy protection in 1996, and "Heroes Reborn" was introduced as part of an effort to increase sales. As part of the rebrand, Liefeld illustrated and co-wrote with Jeph Loeb a run on Captain America that was ultimately cancelled after six issues. Marvel stated that the series was cancelled due to low sales, though Liefeld has contended that he was fired after he refused to take a lower pay rate amid Marvel's bankruptcy proceedings. Waid would return to Captain America in 1998, initially with Garney as artist and later with Andy Kubert.

In 1999, Joe Simon filed to claim the copyright to Captain America under a provision of the Copyright Act of 1976 that allows the original creators of works that have been sold to corporations to reclaim them after the original 56-year copyright term has expired. Marvel challenged the claim, arguing that Simon's 1966 settlement made the character ineligible for copyright transfer. Simon and Marvel settled out of court in 2003, in a deal that paid Simon royalties for merchandising and licensing of the character.

=== Modern era (2000s to present) ===
Writer and artist Dan Jurgens took over Captain America from Waid in 2000, positioning the character in a world he described as "more cynical [...] in terms of how we view our government, our politicians and people's motives in general". In the wake of the September 11 attacks, a new Captain America series written by John Ney Rieber with artwork by John Cassaday was published under the Marvel Knights imprint from 2002 to 2003. The series received criticism for its depiction of Captain America fighting terrorists modelled after Al-Qaeda, though Cassady contended that the aim of the series was to depict "the emotions this hero was going through" in the wake of 9/11, and the "guilt and anger a man in his position would feel".

In 2005, Marvel relaunched Captain America in a new volume written by Ed Brubaker and illustrated by Steve Epting. The run saw the publication of "The Winter Soldier", which reintroduced Captain America's previously deceased partner Bucky Barnes as a brainwashed cybernetic assassin. Contemporaneously, Captain America was a central character in the 2006 crossover storyline "Civil War", written by Mark Millar and penciled by Steve McNiven, which saw the character come into conflict with fellow Avengers member Iron Man over government efforts to regulate superheroes. The character was killed in the 2007 storyline "The Death of Captain America" written by Brubaker, which was accompanied by the miniseries Fallen Son: The Death of Captain America written by Jeph Loeb; the character was later revived in the 2009 limited series Captain America: Reborn. Brubaker's run on Captain America, which ran across various titles until 2012, was critically and commercially acclaimed; Captain America #25 (which contains the character's death) was the best-selling comic of 2007, and Brubaker won the Harvey Award for Best Writer for the series in 2006.

After Brubaker's run on Captain America ended in 2012, a new volume of the series written by Rick Remender was published as part of the Marvel Now rebranding initiative, which saw Sam Wilson assume the mantle of Captain America in 2014. This was followed by a run written by Nick Spencer beginning in 2016, in which Captain America was replaced by a version of himself later known as "Hydra Supreme", loyal to the villainous organization Hydra, culminating in the 2017 crossover event Secret Empire. As part of Marvel's Fresh Start rebrand in 2018, a new Captain America series written by Ta-Nehisi Coates with art by Leinil Francis Yu was published from 2018 to 2021. A volume of Captain America written by J. Michael Straczynski was published from September 2023 to December 2024, followed by a new volume written by Chip Zdarsky in July 2025.

== Characterization ==
=== Fictional character biography ===
As of 2015, Captain America has appeared in more than ten thousand stories, including over 5,000 comic books, books, trade publications and other media formats. The character's origin story has been retold and revised multiple times throughout his editorial history, though its broad details have remained generally consistent. Steven "Steve" Rogers was born in the 1920s to an impoverished family on the Lower East Side of New York City. The frail and infirm Rogers attempts to join the U.S. Army in order to fight in the Second World War, but is rejected after being deemed unfit for military service. His resolve is nevertheless noticed by the military, and he is recruited as the first test subject for "Project Rebirth", a secret government program that seeks to create super soldiers through the development of the "Super-Soldier Serum". Though the serum successfully enhances Rogers to the peak to human physical perfection, a Nazi spy posing as a military observer destroys the remaining supply of the serum and assassinates its inventor, foiling plans to produce additional super soldiers. Rogers is given a patriotic uniform and shield by the American government and becomes the costumed superhero Captain America. He goes on to fight the villainous Red Skull and other members of the Axis powers both domestically and abroad, alongside his sidekick Bucky Barnes and as a member of the Invaders. In the final days of the war, Rogers and Barnes seemingly perish after falling from an experimental drone plane into the northern Atlantic Ocean.

Rogers is found decades later by the superhero team the Avengers, the Super-Soldier Serum having allowed him to survive frozen in a block of ice in a state of suspended animation. Reawakened in modern times, Rogers resumes activities as a costumed hero, joining and later becoming leader of the Avengers. Many of his exploits involve missions undertaken for the Avengers or for S.H.I.E.L.D., an espionage and international law enforcement agency operated by his former war comrade Nick Fury. Through Fury, Rogers befriends Sharon Carter, a S.H.I.E.L.D. agent with whom he eventually begins a partnership and an on-again off-again romance. He meets and trains Sam Wilson, who becomes the superhero Falcon, and they establish an enduring friendship and partnership. After a conspiracy hatched by the Secret Empire to discredit Rogers is revealed to have been personally orchestrated by the President of the United States, a disillusioned Rogers abandons the mantle of Captain America and assumes the title of "Nomad", the "man without a country". He eventually re-assumes the title, and later declines an offer from the "New Populist Party" to run for president himself. He again abandons the mantle of Captain America to briefly assume the alias of "The Captain" when a government commission orders him to work directly for the U.S. government.

In the aftermath of the September 11 attacks, Rogers reveals his secret identity to the world. Following the disbanding of the Avengers, he discovers that Bucky is still alive, having been brainwashed by the Soviets to become the Winter Soldier. Later, in reaction to government efforts to regulate superheroes, Rogers becomes the leader of an underground anti-registration movement that clashes with a pro-registration faction led by fellow Avengers member Iron Man. After significant rancor, he voluntarily surrenders and submits to arrest. At his trial, he is shot and killed by Sharon Carter, whose actions are manipulated by the villainous Dr. Faustus; in his absence, a recovered Bucky assumes the title of Captain America. It is eventually revealed that Rogers did not die, but became displaced in space and time; he is ultimately able to return to the present. He resumes his exploits as a superhero, though his public identity is briefly supplanted by a sleeper agent from the terrorist organization Hydra.

=== Personality and motivations ===
"Rogers' transformation into Captain America is underwritten by the military. But, perhaps haunted by his own roots in powerlessness, he is a dissident just as likely to be feuding with his superiors in civilian and military governance as he is to be fighting with the supervillain Red Skull. [...] He is 'a man out of time,' a walking emblem of greatest-generation propaganda brought to life in this splintered postmodern time."

— Ta-Nehisi Coates

Steve Rogers' personality has shifted across his editorial history, a fact that media scholar J. Richard Stevens sees as a natural consequence of the character being written and re-interpreted by many writers over the span of multiple decades. However, Stevens identifies two aspects of the character's personality that have remained consistent across expressions: his "uncompromising purity" and "his ability to judge the character in others". Early Captain America stories typically paid little attention to Rogers' civilian identity; in his 1970 book The Steranko History of Comics, Jim Steranko notes that the character was often criticized for being two-dimensional as a result. He argues that this was an intentional device, writing that these critics "failed to grasp the true implication of his being. Steve Rogers never existed, except perhaps as an abstract device for the convenience of storytelling. Captain America was not an embodiment of human characteristics but a pure idea."

Following the character's return to comics in the 1960s, many stories gave increased focus to Rogers' civilian identity, particularly his struggles as a "man out of time" attempting to adjust to the modern era. Often, stories depict a brooding or melancholic Rogers as he faces both a physical struggle as Captain America, and an ideological struggle as Steve Rogers to reconcile his social values with modern times. The character is frequently conflicted by his World War II-era "good war" morality being challenged and made anachronistic by the compromising demands of the post-war era.

Prior to Bucky Barnes' return to comics in the 2000s, many Captain America stories centered on Rogers' sense of guilt over Barnes' death. Culture scholar Robert G. Weiner argues that these stories mirror the post-traumatic stress disorder and survivor guilt held by many war veterans, and that this trauma distinguishes the character from other well-known superheroes such as Batman and Spider-Man: while those characters became heroes because of a traumatic incident, Rogers carries on as a hero in spite of a traumatic incident, with Weiner asserting that this reinforces the nobility of the character.

=== Political themes ===
Though Marvel has historically trended away from making overt partisan statements in the post-war period, writers have nevertheless used Captain America to comment on the state of American society and government at particular moments in history. For example, the conspiracy storyline of "Secret Empire" reflected what writer Steve Englehart saw as broad disillusionment with American institutions in the wake of the Vietnam War and the Watergate scandal, the "Streets of Poison" storyline by Mark Gruenwald in the 1990s was intended to address anxieties around the drug trade and debates on the war on drugs, and "Civil War" by Mark Millar was widely interpreted as an allegory for the Patriot Act and post-9/11 debates on the balance between national security and civil liberties. While the ideological orientation of Captain America stories has shifted in response to changing social and political attitudes, Stevens notes how a central component of Captain America's mythology is that the character himself does not change: when the character's attitudes have shifted, it is consistently framed as an evolution or a new understanding of his previously held ideals. Stevens argues that the character's seeming paradoxical steadfastness is reflective of "the language of comics, where continuity is continually updated to fit the needs of the serialized present."

Despite his status as patriotic superhero, Captain America is rarely depicted as an overtly jingoistic figure. Stevens writes that the character's "patriotism is more focused on the universal rights of man as expressed through the American Dream" rather than "a position championing the specific cultural or political goals of the United States." Weiner similarly concurs that the character "embodies what America strives to be, not what it sometimes is". Dittmer agrees that while the character sees himself "as the living embodiment of the American Dream (rather than a tool of the state)", his status as a patriotic superhero nevertheless tethers him to American foreign policy and hegemony. He argues that Captain America tends to skew away from interventionist actions at moments where the United States is undertaking policies that its critics deem imperialist, specifically citing the character's non-participation in the Vietnam and Iraq wars, and argues that the character's inconsistent position on the use of deadly force across his editorial history "is perhaps a tacit acknowledgment of the violence, or the threat of violence, at the heart of American hegemony."

== Powers, abilities, and equipment ==
"Cap is one of the hardest hero characters to write, because the writer cannot use some exotic super-power to make his episodes seem colorful. [...] All he has to serve him are his extraordinary combat skills, his shield, and his unquenchable love for freedom and justice."

— Stan Lee

The Super-Soldier Serum with which he was injected greatly enhanced Captain America's strength, speed, agility, endurance, reflexes, reaction time, and natural self-healing ability. Additionally, he is a master tactician and field commander, and a master of numerous forms of martial arts. His primary fighting styles include boxing, judo, and his own unique acrobatic hand-to-hand combat style. The precise parameters of Captain America's physical prowess vary across stories due to editorial dictates and artistic license taken by authors; scripter Steve Englehart received editorial direction to give the character superhuman strength in the early 1970s, but the change did not remain permanent and was soon forgotten. Steve Rogers is also a skilled visual artist, having worked as a commercial illustrator prior to joining the military, and several storylines have depicted the character working as a freelance artist.

The basic design of Captain America's costume has remained largely consistent from its original incarnation in the 1940s. Designed by Joe Simon, the costume is based on the United States flag, with Simon likening the character's appearance to that of "a modern-day crusader": chain mail armor, and a helmet adorned with wings in reference to the Roman god Mercury. Steve Rogers has worn other costumes when he has adopted alternate superhero alter egos: as Nomad he wears a domino mask and a black and gold suit that is cut to expose his bare chest and stomach, and as The Captain he wears a modified version of the Captain America suit with a red, white, and black design.

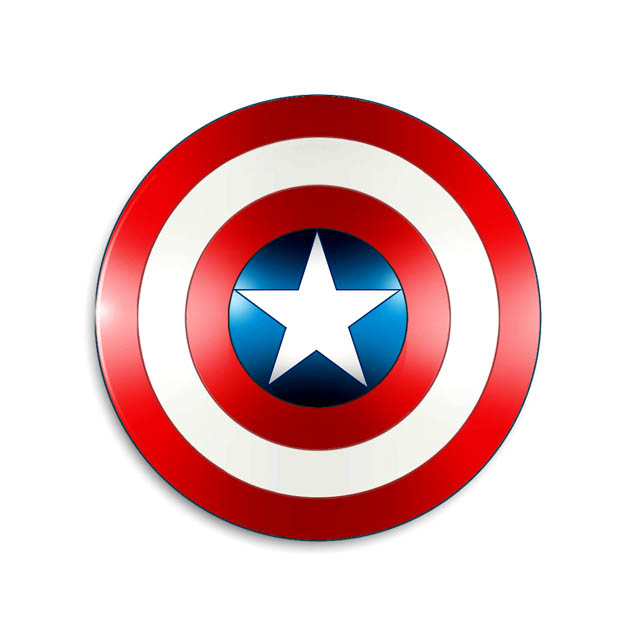
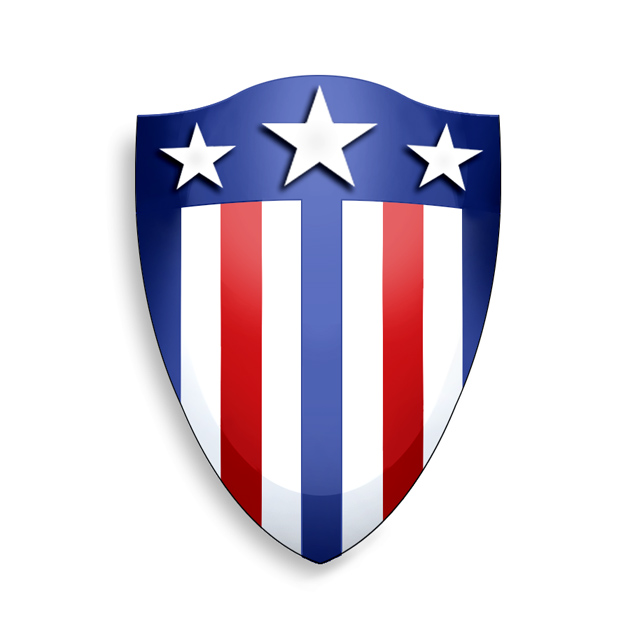
Variants of Captain America's shield

Captain America's shield is the character's primary piece of equipment. It is a round shield with a design featuring a white star on a blue circle surrounded by red and white rings. First appearing in Captain America Comics #1 as a triangular heater shield, beginning in Captain America Comics #2 it was changed to its current circular design due to a complaint from MLJ Comics that the original design too closely resembled the chest symbol of their superhero The Shield. The shield is depicted as constructed from an alloy of vibranium and adamantium, two highly resilient fictional metals appearing in Marvel comic books. It is portrayed as both a virtually indestructible defensive object and a highly aerodynamic offensive weapon: when thrown, it is capable of ricocheting off multiple surfaces and returning to the original thrower.

== Supporting cast ==
=== Sidekicks and partners ===
Captain America's first sidekick was Bucky Barnes, introduced in Captain America Comics #1 as the teenaged "mascot" of Steve Rogers' regiment. He is made Captain America's partner in that same issue after accidentally discovering the character's secret identity. Joe Simon described Bucky's creation as being largely motivated by a need to give Captain America "someone to talk to" and avoid the overuse of dialogue delivered through internal monologue, noting that "Bucky was brought in as a way of eliminating too many thought balloons." Bucky was retroactively established as having been killed in the same accident that left Captain America frozen in suspended animation; the character remained deceased for many decades, contrasting the typically ephemeral nature of comic book deaths, until he returned in 2005 as the Winter Soldier. Initially introduced as a brainwashed assassin and antagonist to Captain America, Bucky's memories and personality were later restored, and he was re-established as an ally to Steve Rogers. Rick Jones briefly assumed the role of Captain America's sidekick and the public identity of Bucky following Captain America's return to comics in the 1960s.

In 1969, Sam Wilson was introduced as the superhero Falcon and later became Captain America's sidekick, making the characters the first interracial superhero duo in American comic books. Possessing the power to communicate with birds, Wilson is initially depicted as a former social worker living in Harlem, though this identity is revealed to be the result of memories implanted by the Red Skull. He later receives a winged suit from the superhero Black Panther that enables him to fly. Other characters who have served as Rogers' sidekick include Golden Girl (Betsy Ross), Demolition Man (Dennis Dunphy), Jack Flag (Jack Harrison), and Free Spirit (Cathy Webster).

=== Enemies ===
Over the course of several decades, writers and artists have established a rogues' gallery of supervillains to face Captain America. The character's primary archenemy is the Red Skull, introduced from the character's origins as an apprentice to Adolf Hitler. Just as Red Skull represents Nazism, many of Captain America's villains represent specific ideologies or political formations: for example, the Serpent Society arguably represents labor unionism, and Flag-Smasher represents anti-nationalism. The political character of Captain America's enemies has shifted over time: the character fought enemies associated with communism during his brief revival in the 1950s before shifting back to Nazi antagonists in the mid-1960s, while comics since 9/11 have frequently depicted the character facing terrorist villains.

=== Romantic interests ===
Steve Rogers' first love interest was Betsy Ross, introduced in his World War II-era comics as a member of the Women's Army Corps who later became the costumed superhero Golden Girl. Peggy Carter, an American member of the French Resistance, was retroactively established in comics published in the 1960s as another of Rogers' wartime lovers. When Rogers is revived in the post-war era, he begins a partnership and on-again off-again relationship with S.H.I.E.L.D. agent Sharon Carter; introduced as Peggy's younger sister, she was later retconned as Peggy's grandniece to reflect Marvel's floating timeline. In comics published in the 1980s, Rogers dated and became engaged to his neighbor Bernie Rosenthal, though they ended their relationship amicably after Bernie left New York to attend law school. In the 1990s, Rogers had a romantic entanglement with the alternately villainous and antiheroic Diamondback, a member of the Serpent Society.

=== Alternate versions of Captain America ===
The title of "Captain America" has been used by other characters in the Marvel Universe in addition to Steve Rogers, including William Naslund, Jeffrey Mace, and William Burnside. John Walker, also known as U.S. Agent, was introduced as a villainous Captain America in 1988, and Isaiah Bradley was established in the 2003 limited series Truth: Red, White & Black as an African American man who acquired superpowers after being used as a test subject for the Super-Soldier Serum. Rogers' sidekicks Bucky Barnes and Sam Wilson have also alternately held the title of Captain America: Barnes in 2008 following Rogers' death in 2007, and Wilson during Marvel's 2012 rebranding campaign Marvel Now!, following Rogers’ loss of the Super Soldier serum. Within the multiverse of parallel universes that compose the Marvel Universe, there are many variations of Steve Rogers and Captain America; this includes Marvel's Ultimate Comics universe, which possesses its own version of Steve Rogers that is more overtly politically conservative.

== Cultural influence and legacy ==
"Over the years, Captain America's story has accurately reflected U.S. attitudes, as our country moved from the self-confidence of the early Cold War to the guilt-ridden angst of the 1970s to the revival of national pride that characterized the Reagan 1980s."

— Jacob Heilbrun, The Los Angeles Times

Captain America is one of the most popular and widely recognized Marvel Comics characters, and has been described as an icon of American popular culture. He is the most well-known and enduring of the United States-themed superheroes to emerge from the Second World War and inspired a proliferation of patriotic-themed superheroes in American comic books during the 1940s. This included the American Crusader, the Spirit of '76, Yank & Doodle, Captain Flag, and Captain Courageous, among numerous others. Though none would achieve Captain America's commercial success, the volume of Captain America imitators was such that three months after the character's debut, Timely published a statement indicating that "there is only one Captain America" and warning that they would take legal action against publishers that infringed on the character. After being dismissed from Timely, Joe Simon and Jack Kirby would themselves create a new patriotic superhero, the Fighting American, for Prize Comics in 1954; the character became the subject of a lawsuit from Marvel in the 1990s after Rob Liefeld attempted to revive the character following his own departure from Marvel.

When the character was killed in 2007, he was eulogized in numerous mainstream media outlets, including The New York Times and The Los Angeles Times, with the former describing him as a "national hero". In 2011, Captain America placed sixth on IGN's "Top 100 Comic Book Heroes of All Time", and second in their 2012 list of "The Top 50 Avengers". Gizmodo and Entertainment Weekly respectively ranked Captain America first and second in their 2015 rankings of Avengers characters. Empire ranked Captain America as the 21st greatest comic book character of all time.

In October 2026, the CGC graded 9.0 copy of 1941 Captain America #1 was sold for $716,750 at Heritage Auctions.

== In other media ==
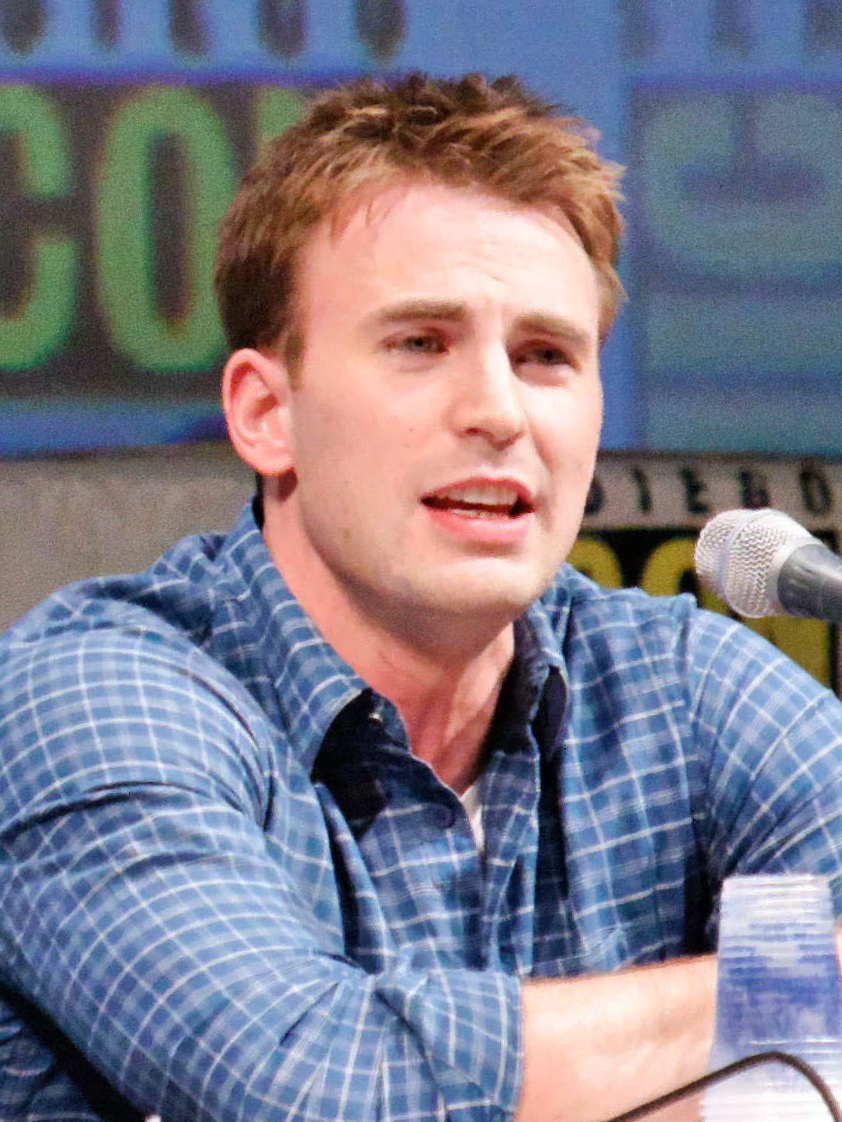
Chris Evans (pictured 2010) portrays Steve Rogers in the Marvel Cinematic Universe.

Captain America has appeared in a variety of adapted, spin-off, and licensed media, including films, cartoons, video games, toys, clothing, and books. The first appearance of Captain America in a medium outside of comic books was in the 1944 serial film Captain America, which was also the first piece of non-comics media to feature a Marvel Comics character. The character later appeared in two made-for-TV films in 1979, Captain America and Captain America II: Death Too Soon, and a self-titled feature-length film in 1990. A trilogy of Captain America films starring Chris Evans as the title character were produced as part of the Marvel Cinematic Universe (MCU) in the 2010s: Captain America: The First Avenger (2011), Captain America: The Winter Soldier (2014), and Captain America: Civil War (2016). The character also appeared in the ensemble films The Avengers (2012), Avengers: Age of Ultron (2015), Avengers: Infinity War (2018), and Avengers: Endgame (2019).

The first appearance of Captain America on television was in the 1966 Grantray-Lawrence Animation series The Marvel Super Heroes. The character would make minor appearances in several Marvel animated series in the subsequent decades, including Spider-Man and His Amazing Friends (1981–1983), X-Men: The Animated Series (1992–1997), and The Avengers: United They Stand (1999–2000). Buoyed by increased popularity from the character's appearances in the MCU, Captain America began appearing in television series in more prominent roles beginning in the 2010s, such as The Avengers: Earth's Mightiest Heroes (2010–2012). Captain America was featured in a novel entitled Captain America: The Great Gold Steal by Ted White, published in 1968, after having appeared a year earlier as one of the characters in a novel about the Avengers, called The Avengers Battle the Earth-Wrecker, written by veteran comic book writer and science fiction novelist Otto Binder.
