= List of Iron Man enemies =

Iron Man is a superhero appearing in comic books published by Marvel Comics. The character was created by Stan Lee, Larry Lieber, Don Heck, and Jack Kirby and first appeared in 1962.

== Rogues gallery ==
Included are villains who are predominantly associated with Iron Man or have a significant history with him. Villains who have only limited encounters with Iron Man are not included. Superheroes who have come into conflict with Iron Man are not included unless they began as villains.

Name	Alter ego	First appearance	Description
Adam Ware		Iron Man #1 (2026)	Adam Ware is a genius teacher that specialised in Education technologies who was captured by AIM and forced to demonstrate his skills to become the next Tony Stark. He later resurrects as A.I.M.’s new leader.
Arsenal		Iron Man #114 (1978)	Arsenal is a robot created by Iron Man's father Howard Stark during World War II.
Atom-Smasher	Kevin Leonardo	Iron Man #287 (1992)	Atom-Smasher is an environmentalist. His actions against Stark Industries' nuclear energy facilities convince James Rhodes, then the company's CEO, to divest from the project.
Black Knight	Nathan Garrett	Tales to Astonish #52 (1963)	Wears black, medieval-looking armor.
Black Lama	Jerald	Iron Man #53 (1972)	An extra-dimensional mystic who tried to incite a war amongst the supervillains.
Blizzard	Gregor Shapanka	Tales of Suspense #45 (1963)	Blizzard is a Hungarian scientist who studies cryogenics. He uses a cryogenic suit that allows him to project ice and waves of cold. Before he was Blizzard, Shapanka used the name Jack Frost. He is killed by Iron Man 2020.
Blizzard	Donnie Gill	Iron Man #233 (1987)	After Shapanka's death, Justin Hammer gave the criminal Donnie Gill a cryogenic suit, and Gill became the new Blizzard. Gill then works with the Masters of Evil and the Thunderbolts.
Blood Brothers	Gh'Ree and R'Hos	Iron Man #55 (1973)	The Blood Brothers are two alien brothers who consume blood. They possess super strength so long as they stand beside one another.
Boomerang	Frederick Myers	Tales to Astonish #81 (1966)	Boomerang is a former Major League Baseball player who becomes a boomerang-throwing villain for the Secret Empire.
Bruce Babbage		Invincible Iron Man Vol. 2 #25 (2010)	A military general in the U.S. Army who wanted to stop Tony Stark from being Iron Man and use his armor as a military weapon.
Cassandra Gillespie		International Iron Man #1 (2016)	Cassandra Gillespie is an international arms dealer and was a childhood love interest of Tony Stark when he was studying at the University of Cambridge.
Chemistro	Calvin Carr	Power Man and Iron Fist #93 (1983)	Able to transmute any substance into any other form of matter.
Coldblood	Eric Savin	Marvel Comics Presents #26 (1989)	Lieutenant Colonel going by the real name of Eric Savin. Resurrected as a cyborg after having cyberbenetic surgery.
Commander Kraken	Unknown	Sub-Mariner #27 (1970)	Commander Kraken is a pirate who uses a submarine to attack ships. Initially introduced as a villain of Namor, he later faces the Cat and then Iron Man. He briefly works for Hydra and is later killed by the Scourge of the Underworld.
Controller	Basil Sandhurst	Iron Man #12 (1969)	The Controller wears a powered armor that gives him superhuman strength, and he uses discs to control the minds of others. He also invents a method to sap mental energy from people to increase his own power.
Count Nefaria	Luchino Nefaria	The Avengers #13 (1965)	Count Nefaria is the wealthy head of the Maggia criminal organization and has encountered several superheroes in this capacity.
Crimson Cowl	Justine Hammer	Thunderbolts #3 (1997)	The daughter of Justin Hammer, later used the identity to lead a version of the Masters of Evil and bedevil the Thunderbolts.
Crimson Dynamo	Boris Turgenov	Tales of Suspense #52 (1964)	Turgenov was on the team that helped Anton Vanko invent the Crimson Dynamo armor. He and Black Widow are sent to the United States by the Soviet government to seize Vanko and the armor following Vanko's defection. Turgenov acquires the suit and defeats Iron Man, but Vanko sacrifices himself to kill Turgenov in an explosion.
Crimson Dynamo	Alex Nevsky	Iron Man #15 (1969)	Nevsky was on the team that helped Anton Vanko invent the Crimson Dynamo armor. While under suspicion for collaborating with Vanko after the latter's defection, Nevsky flees to the United States. He builds a new Crimson Dynamo armor and attacks Iron Man for leading Vanko to defect. He flees and takes refuge in Vietnam, but he is arrested, returned to Russia, and executed. The armor is then worn by several other people who do not use it to fight Iron Man.
Crusher	Caldwell Rozza	Tales of Suspense #91 (1967)	A South American scientist who created the "Crusher 1" Formula, which granted him superhuman strength, dense skin, and a weight of 1,000 lb (450 kg).
Detroit Steel	Doug Johnson III	Invincible Iron Man Vol. 2 #25 (2010)	The Detroit Steel armor is constructed by Justine Hammer and Sasha Hammer as a new version of the Iron Man armor. They hire Johnson to use it, but he is turned to stone during the "Fear Itself" storyline. He returns, but Sasha then kills him so she can use the armor.
Detroit Steel	Sasha Hammer	Invincible Iron Man Vol. 2 #1 (2008)	Sasha Hammer is the daughter of Justine Hammer and the Mandarin. She begins a romantic relationship with Zeke Stane, who augments her body with energy whips, durability, and the ability to fly. She takes the Detroit Steel armor following Johnson's apparent death, and she kills him when he returns.
Devastator	Gregori Larionov	Rom #44 (1983)	Larionov uses the Devastator armor, which was created by the Gremlin for the Soviet Union. He comes into conflict with Iron Man while working with Valentin Shatalov, the Crimson Dynamo. Before Larionov, the Devastator armor was originally used by Kirov Petrovna to battle the Hulk.
Doctor Doom	Victor Von Doom	The Fantastic Four #5 (1962)	Victor Von Doom is the monarch of Latveria with mastery of science and magic. While Doom has a longtime rivalry with Reed Richards and is the Fantastic Four’s nemesis, he shares a extensive history with Tony and Doom has even taken up the mantle of Infamous Iron Man.
Doctor Spectrum	Kenji Obatu	Avengers #69 (1969)	Ability to project and manipulate light energy in various colors, create light energy constructs of various shapes, sizes and colors.
Dreadknight	Bram Velsing	Iron Man #101 (1977)	After Bram Velsing betrays his master Doctor Doom, Doom fuses a helmet on his head. Dreadknight then fights Iron Man and Frankenstein's Monster.
Dreadnoughts		Strange Tales #154 (1967)	The Dreadnoughts are robotic soldiers. The original Dreadnought is invented by Hydra. More Dreadnoughts were created by the Maggia using stolen blueprints and by Zeke Stane for Mandarin's use.
Edwin Cord		Daredevil #167 (1980)	Edwin Cord is a military contractor who competes with Stark Industries. He equips the Raiders and Firepower to fight Iron Man, as well as The Jury to fight the Thunderbolts.
Endotherm	Thomas Wilkins	Iron Man #136 (1980)	A Stark employee who becomes paranoid at the thought of losing his job.
Feilong	Kelvin Heng	X-Men Vol. 6 #1 (2021)	A mutant-hating genius industrialist whose goal was to conquer Mars and later allied with Orchis.
Fin Fang Foom		Strange Tales #89 (1961)	Alien who resembles a giant fire-breathing dragon.
Firebrand	Gary Gilbert	Iron Man #27 (1970)	Firebrand presents a radical militant alternative to Iron Man's liberalism. After facing discrimination and seeing peaceful protests fail, he begins engaging in violent acts of protest. Firebrand uses flamethrowers in combat. His grievances are portrayed sympathetically and cause Iron Man to question the state of society that led to Firebrand's creation. Initially portrayed as a black nationalist, he is later reinvented as a more destructive anarchist fighting corporations. He is killed by the Scourge of the Underworld, revived by The Hood, and killed again by the Punisher.
Firebrand	Russell Broxtel	Web of Spider-Man #77 (1991)	Broxtel steals the Firebrand suit after Gilbert's death and becomes a villain for hire.
Firebrand	Richard Dennison	Iron Man Vol. 3 #4 (1998)	Dennison is an environmentalist who is injured and mutated while bombing an energy research program, turning him into a being of flaming energy.
Firepower	Jack Taggert	Iron Man #230 (1988)	Firepower is an armored riot control unit created by Edwin Cord and Justin Hammer with stolen Stark technology on behalf of Senator Boynton. When Iron Man begins hunting people who used his stolen technology, Cord hires Jack Taggert to use the armor. Iron Man fakes his death at the hands of Firepower, but he then returns to defeat Firepower and have him arrested.
Ghost	Unknown	Iron Man #219 (1987)	Ghost is a corporate spy and saboteur who develops a suit that renders him intangible. He wishes to destroy corporations and has been hired by several groups to do so.
Gladiator	Melvin Potter	Daredevil #18 (1966)	The Gladiator is a costume designer who attempts to rival superheroes by creating his own weaponized superhero costume.
Grey Gargoyle	Paul Pierre Duval	Journey Into Mystery #107 (1964)	Grey Gargoyle is a villain who invents a chemical that lets him turn objects to stone by touching them. He is first introduced as a Thor villain. Grey Gargoyle comes into conflict with Iron Man after he is empowered and mind controlled by Mokk during the "Fear Itself" storyline.
Guardsman	Kevin O'Brien	Iron Man #31 (1970; as O'Brien); Iron Man #43 (1971; as Guardsman)	Guardsman is a friend of Tony Stark who uses a green and blue armor. He becomes an enemy of Iron Man when he attacks a crowd that is protesting against Stark Industries. After O'Brien's brother steals the armor to get revenge, it is later revealed that the armor's malfunctioning circuits had caused the already unstable wearers to go insane.
Harrington Byrd		Tales of Suspense #46 (1963)	Harrington Byrd is a United States senator who targets Tony Stark and tries to investigate him.
Iron Man 2020	Arno Stark	Machine Man 2020 #2 (1978)	Arno Stark is a cousin of Tony Stark from an alternate dimension. He uses his own version of the Iron Man armor.
Iron Monger	Obadiah Stane	Iron Man #163 (1982)	Obadiah Stane is a business rival of Tony Stark who takes over Stark's company, leaving Stark impoverished and homeless. Stane creates his own armor using Stark's technology. When Iron Man defeats him, Stane uses the armor's weapons to commit suicide.
Iron Patriot	Norman Osborn	The Amazing Spider-Man #14 (1964; as Green Goblin); Dark Avengers #1 (2009; as Iron Patriot)	Norman Osborn, the Spider-Man villain Green Goblin, becomes the leader of H.A.M.M.E.R. and the Dark Avengers to combat Iron Man during the Dark Reign storyline. When Stark erases the registry of superhero secret identities to keep it from Osborn, Osborn declares him a fugitive. Stark and Osborn then fight, with Osborn wearing a modified Iron Man armor and calling himself the Iron Patriot.
Justin Hammer		Iron Man #120 (1979)	Justin Hammer is a business rival of Tony Stark. He works with criminals, providing them with equipment so they can fight Iron Man. He is the primary antagonist of the Armor Wars storyline.
Kang the Conqueror	Nathaniel Richards	The Avengers #8 (1964)	Kang is a villain of the Avengers who envies Iron Man's technological abilities. One of the most poorly received Iron Man stories features Kang brainwashing Iron Man and turning him evil.
Kearson DeWitt		Iron Man #258 (1990)	DeWitt is the son of a failed businessman. When he becomes jealous of Tony Stark, he builds his own armor and hacks Stark's bio-prosthetics to control his nervous system.
Korvac	Michael Korvac	Giant-Size Defenders #3 (1975)	Michael Korvac is a man from the 31st century. He is augmented by the Badoon so the lower half of his body is a computer, and he becomes more powerful when he absorbs the Power Cosmic.
Living Laser	Arthur Parks	The Avengers #34 (1966)	The Living Laser is a scientist who becomes living energy and projects holograms.
Madame Masque	Whitney Frost	Tales of Suspense #97 (1968)	Madame Masque is the daughter of the crime lord Count Nefaria. She was Tony Stark's love interest until she betrays him to protect her father in Iron Man #116–117 (1978). She then succeeded her father as leader of the Maggia. Madame Masque began wearing her gold mask because she had scars across her face.
Magma	Jonathan Darque	Marvel Team-Up #110 (1981)	Wears body armor and has a blast gun implanted in his right arm that was able to fire balls of lava.
Mallen		Iron Man Vol. 4 #1 (2005)	Mallen is the antagonist of the Extremis storyline, where he uses the Extremis virus to physically enhance himself. When Mallen defeats Iron Man, Stark uses the Extremis virus and biologically connects himself to the Iron Man armor's interface. Iron Man then kills Mallen.
Mandarin	Unknown	Tales of Suspense #50 (1964)	A brilliant technologist and mystic martial artist with tremendous wealth and organizational resources. He was trained obsessively almost from birth in science and combat, then became an explorer and found a spaceship full of alien technology. The Mandarin is regarded as Iron Man's archenemy.
Mandarin	Temugin	Iron Man Vol. 3 #53 (2002)	Temugin is the son of the Mandarin. When his father dies, Temugin takes the ten rings and becomes the new Mandarin so he can fight Iron Man to avenge his father. Though he eventually rids himself of the rings, his father is revived and reclaims them.
Mauler	Brendan Doyle	Iron Man #156 (1982)	Doyle is a mercenary who retrieves a stolen Mauler armor on the behalf of its creator, Edwin Cord. He then keeps the armor to use in his work as a mercenary. He gives up the armor when confronted by Iron Man, but he later acquires a new suit.
Melter	Bruno Horgan	Tales of Suspense #47 (1963)	Melter is a former weapons manufacturer who went out of business after his equipment failed safety inspections. He creates a melting beam to attack Stark Industries and then joins the Masters of Evil among other groups. He is later killed by the Scourge of the Underworld.
Midas	Mordecai Midas	Iron Man #17 (1969)	Midas is a Greek businessman who wishes to take over Stark Industries. He rescues Whitney Frost and gives her the identity of Madame Masque, but after working for him she betrays him in favor of Tony Stark. Midas gains a controlling share over Stark International, but his mind is destroyed by an accidental psychic attack from Marianne Rodgers. After recovering, he body turns to gold and he gains the ability to turn other things to gold.
Mister Doll	Nathan Dolly	Tales of Suspense #48 (1963)	A hooded man that uses a magical transforming doll (similar to a voodoo doll) which he stole from an African wise-man to attack Iron Man after he causes pain to millionaires to try to make them sign over their fortunes, and Tony Stark becomes his next target. His first appearance was in Tales of Suspense #48. He caused Tony to create a newer, slimmer suit. He is defeated when Iron Man uses a device to remodel the doll to Mr. Doll's semblance, meaning when he drops it, he is knocked unconscious.
MODOK	George Tarleton	Tales of Suspense #94 (1967)	MODOK is created by AIM as part of a human experiment. He later takes control of the organization.
Nikita Khrushchev		Tales to Astonish #35 (1962)	Nikita Khrushchev was the real-life premier of the Soviet Union. He was portrayed in Iron Man comics from 1963 to 1965 as the mastermind behind several villainous plots. In these appearances, he is depicted as viciously cruel and driven by rage.
Radioactive Man	Chen Lu	Journey Into Mystery #93 (1963)	Radioactive Man is first introduced as a villain for Thor. He comes into conflict with Iron Man as a minion of the Mandarin.
Red Barbarian	Andre Rostov	Tales of Suspense #42 (1963)	The Red Barbarian is a member of the Soviet Army. He is depicted as a caricature of Russians, where he is shown to be violent, angry, and gluttonous.
Scarecrow	Ebenezer Laughton	Tales of Suspense #51 (1964)	Scarecrow is a contortionist and a serial killer.
Shockwave	Lancaster Sneed	Master of Kung Fu #42 (1976)	A former MI-6 agent, who stole an exo-suit.
Slag	Theodore Slaght	Iron Man #314 (1995)	Dr. Ted Slaght is a scientist and former teacher of Tony Stark that works for Stark Enterprises. A terrible accident transforms him into a liquid metallic form called Slag and he wants revenge on Tony Stark for "betraying" him.
Spymaster	Unknown	Iron Man #33 (1971)	Spymaster is a criminal trained by Taskmaster. He is the leader of the Espionage Elite and he sometimes works as an agent of the Zodiac and Roxxon Oil. He steals the blueprints for the Iron Man armor and sells them to Justin Hammer. Spymaster is betrayed and killed while on a mission with Ghost, who makes him intangible and then solidifies him inside of a wall.
Spymaster	Nathan Lemon	Iron Man #254 (1990)	Lemon is one of several candidates hired by Justin Hammer and trained by Taskmaster to be the new Spymaster, and he is chosen after killing the others. He fights Iron Man several times and briefly learns his secret identity before having the memory erased. He is later captured and arrested.
Spymaster	Sinclair Abbot	Iron Man: Inevitable #1 (2006)	Abbot learns Iron Man's secret identity and order's Lemon's killing in prison so he can become the new Spymaster. On a mission to assassinate Tony Stark, he is ambushed by Stark's ally Happy Hogan, who is seemingly killed in their fight.
Stilt-Man	Wilbur Day	Daredevil #8 (1965)	A armored thief who wears a pair of hydraulic stilts.
Sunset Bain		Machine Man #17 (1980)	Is a genius in the field of cybernetics and the CEO of Baintronics, Inc. As Madam Menace she sold high-tech weaponry to criminals throughout the underground. She's a former love interest and business rival to Tony. Her human body was destroyed so she became AI.
Sunturion	Arthur Dearborn	Iron Man #143 (1981)	A normal human who undergoes a mutagenic modification process that converts him into microwave energy.
Super-Adaptoid		Tales of Suspense #82 (1966)	The Super-Adaptoid is created by AIM using a piece of the Cosmic Cube to kill Captain America.
Techno Golem	Tomoe	Invincible Iron Man Vol. 3 #7 (2016)	Operating as the Techno Golem, Tomoe is an Inhuman crime lord in Japan with the ability to control technology with nothing but her thoughts.
Technovore		Iron Man #294 (1993)	An organism which was the result of Cauwfield Chemical Co. clandestinely using nanotechnology on Stark's space station.
Termite	Neil Donaldson	Iron Man #189 (1984)	Termite is a mutant who can dissolve matter. He is hired by Obadiah Stane to sabotage Fetison Electronics, but he loses his powers when a mutant neutralizer is used on him.
Tiberius Stone		Iron Man Vol. 3 #37 (2001)	Tiberius Stone is Tony Stark's childhood friend and the son of a rival businessman. As an adult, he blames Stark for his family's failure, so he ruins Stark's reputation with false news stories and steals his girlfriend Rumiko Fujikawa.
Titanium Man	Boris Bullski	Tales of Suspense #69 (1965)	Titanium Man is a Soviet counterpart to Iron Man. When he is introduced, Bullski is a Soviet commissar. He uses a new version of Anton Vanko's Crimson Dynamo armor to fight Iron Man, where he is defeated by Vanko. Bullski then becomes the Titanium Man in a large suit of green armor and challenges Iron Man to a battle on behalf of the Soviet Union. Titanium Man's armor is significantly larger than Iron Man's.
Titanium Man	Kondrati Topolov	Incredible Hulk #163 (1973; as Gremlin); X-Men vs. Avengers #1 (1987; as Titanium Man)	Topolov, previously using the code name Gremlin, becomes the second Titanium Man.
Thanos		Iron Man #55 (1973)	The Mad Titan.
Udarnik		Iron Man: Fatal Frontier #1 (2013)	A Soviet robot that was stranded on the Moon since 1972. Udarnik possesses two personalities: Udarnik is programmed to build, while Shockworker is used in defense and attack.
Ultimo		Tales of Suspense #76 (1966)	Ultimo is an ancient alien robot that is discovered and utilized by the Mandarin.
Ultron		Avengers #54 (1968)	Ultron is a robot created by Hank Pym.
Unicorn	Milos Masaryk	Tales of Suspense #56 (1964)	The Unicorn begins as a villain working for the Soviet Union. He uses a helmet with a unicorn horn that fires energy blasts. The Unicorn denounces the Soviet Union to be an independent villain in Iron Man #4 (1968).
Vibro	Alton Vibereaux	Iron Man #186 (1984)	Vibro is a seismologist who gained the power to project vibrational force in an accident. His powers are based on his proximity to the San Andreas Fault, and he is powerless when lifted off of the ground.
VOR/TEX		Iron Man #307 (1994)	The Virtual ORganism/Turing EXperiment is a sentient computer program that installs itself inside of Iron Man and takes control of his body to destroy its creators. Tony Stark inflicted pain on VOR/TEX, causing it to delete itself out of fear.
Whiplash	Mark Scarlotti	Tales of Suspense #97 (1968)	Mark Scarlotti is a member of the Maggia when he invents a technological whip and becomes Whiplash. He uses the name Blacklash while working for Justin Hammer. He then retires, and he is killed by Iron Man's sentient armor after he returns as Whiplash.
Whiplash	Ivan Vanko; Anton Vanko	Iron Man vs. Whiplash #1 (2009)	Ivan Vanko became Whiplash to avenge his father, whom he falsely believes was killed by Iron Man.
Whirlwind	David Cannon	Tales to Astonish #50 (1963)	Whirlwind moves at superhuman speeds by spinning his body. Cannon is first introduced as a Giant-Man villain using the code name Human Top.
White Dragon	Unknown	Iron Man #39 (1971)	The first White Dragon was a talented inventor and scientist with a genius-level intellect. The second White Dragon is an expert martial artist.
Wong-Chu		Tales of Suspense #39 (1963)	Wong-Chu is a North Vietnamese communist general. He kidnaps Tony Stark in Vietnam, causing Stark to invent the Iron Man armor. He is the first villain Iron Man faced. It is later established that he was acting on behalf of the Mandarin.
Zeke Stane		The Order #8 (2008)	Zeke Stane is the son of Obadiah Stane, the Iron Man villain Iron Monger. He uses a biological armor with which he modifies his own body. He also develops a way to create powerful biological suicide bombs with Stark's technology and recruits minions to carry out acts of terrorism.

== Organizations ==
Name	First appearance	Description
Advanced Idea Mechanics	Strange Tales #146 (1966)	Advanced Idea Mechanics (AIM) is an organization of scientists who wish to increase their own power. They are the creators of another Iron Man villain, MODOK.
Ani-Men	Daredevil #10 (1965)	Initially introduced as enemies of Daredevil, the Ani-Men are a group of animal-themed criminals brought together by the Organizer. Two iterations of the Ani-Men come into conflict with Iron Man and the Avengers.
Chessmen	Iron Man #163 (1982)	The Chessmen are a chess-themed group of villains who work for Obadiah Stane, the Iron Monger.
Espionage Elite	Iron Man #33 (1970)	The Espionage Elite are the minions of Spymaster. Multiple incarnations of the Espionage Elite have been formed, each from a group of five international mercenaries.
Hydra	Strange Tales #135 (1965)	Hydra is a criminal organization that seeks world domination.
Maggia	Avengers #13 (1965)	
Raiders	Iron Man #145 (1981)	The Raiders were created by Edwin Cord as a demonstration to convince S.H.I.E.L.D. to hire him as a weapons developer. He later uses them to attack Iron Man.
Seekers	Iron Man #214 (1987)	The Seekers are three brothers (Chain, Grasp, and Sonic) who defected from AIM to build their own power armor and operate as independent villains. They later go on to fight other superheroes and support the Secret Empire. Grasp is then replaced by two new member (Fireball and Laserworks).
Ten Rings	Ironheart #2 (2019)	

== Reformed villains ==
Name	Alter ego	First appearance	Description
Beetle	Abner Jenkins	Strange Tales #123 (1964)	Beetle is a supervillain who attempts to steal company secrets from Tony Stark. He later becomes the superhero Mach-X with the Thunderbolts.
Black Widow	Natasha Romanova	Tales of Suspense #52 (1964)	Black Widow is introduced as a femme fatale agent working for the Soviet Union on a mission to steal Iron Man's technology. When she is forced by the Soviet government to become a supervillain, she defects to the United States where she becomes a superhero and joins S.H.I.E.L.D.
Crimson Dynamo	Anton Vanko	Tales of Suspense #46 (1963)	The Crimson Dynamo begins as an agent of the Soviet Union who invents his own version of the Iron Man armor. When he is surprised by Iron Man's mercy, he defects to the United States and begins working for Stark. In his loyalty to the United States, he sacrifices himself to defeat Boris Turgenov. Many villain versions succeeded Vanko however the longest modern incarnation of Crimson Dynamo is Dimitri Bukharin. He’s the leader and member of the Winter Guard
Fin Fang Foom		Strange Tales #89 (1961)	Fin Fang Foom is a Makluan alien shapeshifter who takes the form of a large reptilian monster. He seeks to take over the Earth until he reforms and converts to Buddhism.
Force	Clayton Wilson	Sub-Mariner #66 (1973)	Force becomes a villain by stealing a force field projector and incorporating it in a suit of armor. After a fight with Namor, he is hired by Justin Hammer to engage in illegal operations. He grows remorseful and helps Iron Man fight Justin Hammer, and in return he is hired by Stark Enterprises under a new name. He later helps Iron Man in several fights against supervillains.
Half-Face	Trung Tuan	Tales of Suspense #92 (1967)	Half-Face is a communist villain who faces Iron Man. He defects from the Communist Party after seeing Iron Man save a village.
Hawkeye	Clint Barton	Tales of Suspense #57 (1964)	Hawkeye decides to seek glory as a superhero, but he falls in love with Black Widow and agrees to help her in her villainous pursuits. He reforms after Black Widow does and joins the Avengers.

== See also ==
- List of Iron Man supporting characters
- List of Iron Man titles
- List of Captain America enemies
- List of X-Men enemies
