= Firepower (comics) =

Firepower is an alias used by two supervillains appearing in American comic books published by Marvel Comics.

The character has made minor appearances across several media, such as animated television and the live-action Marvel Cinematic Universe film Iron Man 3 in which he was portrayed by Ashley Hamilton.

== Fictional character biography ==
=== Jack Taggert ===
Firepower

Publication information
- Publisher: Marvel Comics
- First appearance: Iron Man #230 (May 1988)
- Created by: David Michelinie; Bob Layton; Mark Bright

In-story information
- Alter ego: Jack Taggert
- Species: Human
- Team affiliations: Edwin Cord; Mandarin's Minions
- Abilities: Skilled aviator Skilled combatant Skilled marksman Skilled tactician Armored suit grants: Particle cannon Heat beams Lasers; Mini-grenades; Surface-to-air missiles High energy, low radiation missile Flight; Superhuman durability Superhuman strength Superhuman reflexes

Jack Taggert helped create an experimental pilotable suit for Project: Firepower, which was meant to be used as a deterrent against opponents of the United States. During the "Armor Wars" storyline, Iron Man begins attacking armored villains and even government agents without provocation, resulting in the Firepower program being modified with the specific goal of stopping Iron Man. Iron Man, in his secret identity as Tony Stark, is invited to the first formal demonstration of the Firepower suit. As Iron Man, Stark attacks the Firepower armor, only to learn that it is immune to the negator pack he would have used to disable it. Stark retreats and allows his armor to be destroyed, faking his death.

Edwin Cord blackmails the military into allowing him to keep the Firepower armor, then has Jack Taggert use the armor to threaten Tony Stark and his workers. Finally having had enough of Firepower, Stark builds a new set of armor that allows him to stop it. In a desperate, last-ditch attempt to win, Taggert activates the Terminax, a low-power nuclear missile, to launch without a set target. However, Iron Man damages the launcher backpack that houses the missile, threatening everybody in the vicinity. Iron Man releases an electromagnetic pulse that temporarily disables his and Firepower's armor, allowing him to stop the Terminax once the armor reactivates. Iron Man then rips the Firepower armor apart, stunning Taggert into submission.

=== David Roberts ===
The second Firepower is David Roberts, a government official. He is tasked to deal with Atom-Smasher, an eco-terrorist who sought to make illegal dumping grounds on a property owned by Stane International. Firepower battles Atom Smasher until War Machine unleashes an EMP blast that renders his armor inoperable until it reboots. War Machine carries the suit out to the army detail outside of the Stane Facility and orders them off the property.

== Powers and abilities ==
Firepower’s armor provides him with a high degree of protection from energy and physical attacks. His strength, reflexes and endurance have all been enhanced by his armor and he can fly at sub-sonic speeds. The suit is also air conditioned to prevent discomfort for the operator. The Firepower armor contains a vast array of sensors and an impressive array of weapons including four back-mounted surface-to-air missiles (and additional missiles mounted on leg hardpoints), chest-mounted heat beam lasers, mini-grenades and arm-mounted concussive cannons. The armor can also fire a small tactical nuclear missile known as Terminax from a back-mounted launch tube. Described as a "two-ton tuxedo" by Jack Taggart, the suit was extremely large and its wearer had to be lifted into it with a special crane.

== Other versions ==
- An alternate universe version of Firepower makes a cameo appearance in Iron Man #284.
- An alternate universe version of Firepower appears in the Ultimate Marvel imprint. This version is a riot squad working for the London Metropolitan Police whose members use powered suits based on Iron Man's technology. After Iron Man and Justine Hammer expose Firepower to the British government, the group is recalled.

== In other media ==
=== Television ===
- Firepower appears in the Iron Man episode "The Armor Wars", voiced by Efrem Zimbalist Jr. This version is an automaton built by Justin Hammer.
- Firepower appears in the Iron Man: Armored Adventures episode "Armor Wars", voiced by an uncredited actor. This version is an unnamed criminal, former Maggia enforcer, and member of Obadiah Stane's Guardsmen.

=== Film ===
Jack Taggert appears in Iron Man 3, portrayed by Ashley Hamilton. This version is a soldier recruited by Aldrich Killian to participate in the Extremis program. At the TCL Chinese Theatre, Taggert meets with Eric Savin, who gives him a number of injections. Upon using one and overdosing, Taggert's Extremis virus malfunctions, which causes him to explode.

=== Video games ===
Firepower appears in Iron Man 2, voiced by Cedric Yarbrough. This version is a mercenary and ally of A.I.M.
