= Red Barbarian =

- Modern-era Red Barbarian

Publication information
- Publisher: Marvel Comics
- First appearance: Tales of Suspense #42 (June, 1963)
- Created by: Stan Lee; Robert Bernstein; Don Heck

In-story information
- Alter ego: Colonel Andre Rostov
- Partnerships: The Actor
- Notable aliases: Excellency; Warden
- Abilities: None

The Red Barbarian is a character appearing in American comic books published by Marvel Comics. The character is depicted as a villain and the alter ego of Colonel Andre Rostov. First appearing in Tales of Suspense #42 (June, 1963), the Red Barbarian was created by Stan Lee, Robert Bernstein and Don Heck.

== Fictional character biography ==
=== 1960s ===
Tales of Suspense #42 (June 1963): Red Barbarian debuts. Cover art by Don Heck.

The Red Barbarian was a Communist general in an unnamed country, known for his brutality. After an attempt to steal an atomic bomb prototype from Stark Industries is foiled by Iron Man, the Red Barbarian is approached by another Soviet agent known as the Actor who is superior in disguising himself. The duo scheme to steal the secret disintegrator ray blueprints of Tony Stark. The Actor is sent to impersonate Stark and get the plans. The Actor succeeds in doing so, through the means of changing from disguise to disguise, and even learns the secret identity of Iron Man. However, Iron Man manages to get back the classified papers from the Actor. Posing as the Actor, Iron Man meets with the Red Barbarian. When the actual Actor returns, the Red Barbarian thinks he is the imposter and shoots him before he can reveal Iron Man's secret identity.

=== 2010s ===
After a long period of absence, the Red Barbarian resurfaces as the warden of a gulag where Bucky Barnes is serving time for killing two Russian citizens. He is later seen living in the Bahamas until he is assassinated by Barnes.

== Other versions ==
An alternate universe version of the Red Barbarian appears in Iron Man and the Armor Wars, an adaptation of the "Armor Wars" storyline.
