= Sunturion =

Sunturion is the name of two fictional characters appearing in American comic books published by Marvel Comics.

== Publication history ==
The Arthur Dearborn incarnation of Sunturion first appeared in Iron Man #143 (February 1981) and was created by writers David Michelinie and Bob Layton, and penciler John Romita Jr.

The Mike Stone incarnation of Sunturion first appeared in Daredevil #224 (November 1985), and was created by writer Jim Owsley and penciller Dan Jurgens.

== Fictional character biography ==
=== Arthur Dearborn ===
Sunturion
- Sunturion as depicted in Iron Man #143 (February 1981); Art by Bob Layton.

Publication information
- Publisher: Marvel Comics
- First appearance: Iron Man #143 (February 1981)
- Created by: David Michelinie; John Romita Jr. Bob Layton

In-story information
- Alter ego: Arthur Dearborn
- Species: Human mutate
- Team affiliations: Roxxon Oil
- Abilities: Density control Microwave energy projection Force field generation Flight; Teleportation

The Roxxon Energy Corporation in conjunction with the Brand Corporation, their genetic research subsidiary, convert Roxxon employee Arthur Dearborn into an energy being dubbed Sunturion. He accepted being subjected to this process so that he could guard and maintain the satellite Star Well I, developed as a means of gaining clean energy; the station's main flaw was that the need to maintain a human crew would not make the process cost-effective, but by making Dearborn something other than human they were able to minimize the demands of an organic crew as Dearborn no longer needed to eat or drink and required only minimal creature comforts.

An accident on Star Well I kills the entire population of Allentown, Iowa, and Iron Man meets with Dearborn while investigating. The pair prevent a meteor shower from damaging Star Well I. After discovering that Star Well I is a Roxxon satellite, Iron Man locates and deactivates a self-destruct device when company director Jonas Hale learns of Iron Man's presence and attempts to destroy the satellite. Iron Man advises Sunturion that, despite his admiration for Dearborn's goals, the satellite is now evidence of Roxxon's criminal activities and must be confiscated. Sunturion attacks Iron Man as he disables the satellite, and during their battle Star Well I's core drifts into Earth's atmosphere. Sunturion sacrifices himself to boost Iron Man's deflector beam, allowing the satellite to fall harmlessly into the Gulf of Carpentaria.

Roxxon resurrects Dearborn to battle Stratosfire, a former Roxxon employee with abilities similar to his. Originally the corporate symbol for Roxxon (as Iron Man is for Stark International), Stratosfire turns against the company when a close friend is murdered for speaking with Tony Stark. Sunturion locates Stratosfire and activates her "Zed Control": a self-destruct device that dissipates her energy and reverts Dearborn to his human form.

After Kathy Dare shoots Tony Stark, paralyzing him, Dearborn serves as a witness at her trial. At the time, Stark is preparing to withdraw from public life and become Iron Man full-time, but the testimony of Dearborn and others convinces him that there is still value to being Tony Stark.

Dearborn regains his powers as Sunturion during an encounter with Spider-Man, who is attempting to prevent the theft of vibranium.

Dearborn learns that his energy form is dissipating and that he will soon die. After Roxxon refuses to help him to save resources, Dearborn attacks their facilities around the world. The Avengers stop Dearborn, who returns to Roxxon for treatment.

=== Mike Stone ===
Following Dearborn's apparent death, Roxxon develops armor in an unsuccessful attempt to resurrect him. The armor is lost at sea and found by truck driver Mike Stone, who uses it to take revenge on a former employer. However, Stone is killed after Daredevil damages his armor.

== Powers and abilities ==
Arthur Dearborn is a normal human who undergoes a mutagenic modification process that converts him into microwave energy. In this converted state Dearborn is capable of projecting microwave energy; creating force fields; teleportation; flight; and absorption of solar radiation to replenish his own energy.

The armor found by Mike Stone provides the wearer with abilities similar to those of Dearborn's energy form. To power itself, however, the armor converts the wearer into microwave energy.

== Other versions ==
An alternate timeline variant of Sunturion who joined the Avengers appears in What If? #38.

== In other media ==
- The Arthur Dearborn incarnation of Sunturion appears in the Iron Man episode "Cell of Iron", voiced by David Warner and Tom Kane respectively. This version suffers from a deadly disease that he eliminated through microwave radiation. However, the treatment's side effects cause him to transform into Sunturion and uncontrollably emit deadly radiation, with the Star Well space station being constructed to give him sanctuary. After A.I.M. targets the station, Iron Man intervenes to help Dearborn, who sacrifices himself to stop the Star Well from crashing into New York City.
- The Sunturion appears in the Iron Man: Armored Adventures episode "The Might of Doom". This version is a Makluan guardian created by the original Mandarin to guard one of his rings and test potential successors.
