= Edwin Cord =

Publication information
- Publisher: Marvel Comics
- First appearance: Daredevil #167 (November 1980)
- Created by: David Michelinie, Bob Layton, and John Romita Jr.

In-story information
- Alter ego: Edwin Cord

Edwin Cord is a fictional character appearing in American comic books published by Marvel Comics. Introduced as an enemy of Daredevil, Cord also fought Iron Man in the storyline Armor Wars.

== Publication history ==
Edwin Cord was created by David Michelinie and Frank Miller, and first appeared in Daredevil #167 (November 1980).

== Fictional character biography ==
Edwin Cord is a businessman and the head of Cord Conglomerate. He first appears as the target of Aaron Soames, who is using stolen Mauler armor from Cord Conglomerate and plans to get revenge on Cord after being deprived of his pension benefits. Soames is thwarted by Daredevil and is killed by Cord's men.

From his palatial estate on the East Coast, Cord devises plans to consistently undermine Iron Man. Tony Stark first encounters Cord at the Conclave of Electronics Engineers and Innovators in Dallas, Texas. Cord hires the Raiders to take on Iron Man. After the Raiders are defeated, Cord shows a film of the Raiders' exploits to S.H.I.E.L.D. in an attempt to obtain a weapons contract. S.H.I.E.L.D. is unimpressed by Cord's illegal means and has him arrested.

During the Armor Wars storyline, Cord is released from prison. He, Senator Boynton, and General Meade oversee Jack Taggert, who has begun using Cord's Firepower armor. Cord is approached by Boynton and Meade, who intend for him to hand over the Firepower armor. Cord refuses and has Taggert destroy Boynton and Meade's truck.

Over the next few days, Cord and Firepower aim to sabotage Stark Enterprises, blowing up a shipment of the company's subsidiary Acutech Research and Development. Cord and Firepower drive Stark Enterprises to the point where Tony Stark "can't afford to lose another account". Firepower gives Stark a message from Cord, stating that he destroyed Iron Man and now plans to destroy Stark's life.

== In other media ==
- Edwin Cord appears in Iron Man: Rise of Technovore, voiced by Liam O'Brien. This version is an agent of A.I.M. and a business partner of Ezekiel Stane.
- Edwin Cord was originally going to appear in Iron Man 3, but was replaced with Aldrich Killian.

== See also ==
- Ted Kord, a similar character in DC comics who succeeded Dan Garret as the Blue Beetle
