= Justin Hammer =

Marvel Comics fictional character

- Justin Hammer; Art by Ron Lim

Publication information
- Publisher: Marvel Comics
- First appearance: Iron Man #120 (March 1979)
- Created by: David Michelinie (writer); Bob Layton (writer); John Romita Jr. (artist)

In-story information
- Species: Human
- Place of origin: Surrey, England
- Team affiliations: Hammer Industries
- Abilities: Genius-level intellect Expert strategist

Justin Hammer is a fictional character appearing in American comic books published by Marvel Comics. The character is depicted as a villainous entrepreneur, head of Hammer Industries and a frequent adversary of the superhero Iron Man. He is the reason why many of Iron Man's supervillain enemies have access to extremely advanced technology and why these foes use their equipment for violent crimes instead of profiting by bringing the designs to market. These villains are his underworld mercenaries, secretly armed and contractually obliged to fulfill missions against Hammer's competitors and enemies, such as Tony Stark. He is also the father of Justine Hammer and the grandfather of Sasha Hammer.

Sam Rockwell portrays the character in the Marvel Cinematic Universe (MCU) film Iron Man 2 (2010), the Marvel One-Shot direct-to-video short film All Hail the King (2014), and the second season of the animated television series What If...? (2023).

== Publication history ==
Justin Hammer first appeared in Iron Man #120 (March 1979), and was created by David Michelinie, John Romita Jr., and Bob Layton. Layton himself recalled in a 2014 interview that he and Michelinie originally created Hammer as the cautionary tale of what kind of person Tony Stark might have become if he stayed on his path as a global war profiteer, as well as a tribute to actor Peter Cushing; in Layton's words, Stark and Hammer are essentially in the same line of work, but with diametrically opposed moral views.

== Fictional character biography ==
Justin Hammer was born in Surrey, England and later became a citizen of Monaco. A multi-billionaire businessman and rival of industrialist Tony Stark (Iron Man), Hammer later becomes a criminal financier through unethical methods while using his company Hammer Industries as a front. In exchange for fifty percent of the crime profits, he pays bail for costumed criminals and finances the development and replacement of their weaponry and equipment. If a mercenary under his employ violates their contract, Hammer sends an enforcement unit, usually led by Blacklash, to attack the rogue and confiscate their equipment.

At the start of the Demon in a Bottle storyline, Hammer invents the Hypersonic Scan Transmitter, which enables him to take control of Iron Man's armor. Angered that he had lost a lucrative bid to Stark International, Hammer forces Iron Man to kill an ambassador and set an army of superhuman criminals against him. Ultimately, Stark not only clears his name and destroys the control device, but finally learns that Hammer had been behind multiple attacks against him for years.

During the "Armor Wars" storyline, Hammer has Spymaster steal Iron Man's technology and sells it to a number of villains who wields powered armor, including Stilt-Man, the Raiders, the Mauler, Beetle, Crimson Dynamo, and Titanium Man. Iron Man sets about to disable the Stark-based technology in the suits in question, going so far as to also disable sanctioned technology in the armor of S.H.I.E.L.D.'s Mandroids and the Vault's Guardsmen, leading him into conflict with Captain America and the Avengers.

Years later, it was revealed that Hammer had obtained Stane International after Obadiah Stane's death, causing problems for Stark through his old company. With operatives of Hydra, Roxxon Oil, Moroboshi International, and the Trinational Commission, he tricks the Masters of Silence into attacking Stark Enterprises. Even when forced to sell his stock in Stane International to Stark for the sum of one dollar, Hammer had the last laugh when the shady dealings of Stane International pile up on Stark.

In the mini-series Bad Blood, Hammer is diagnosed with incurable cancer and resolves to destroy his nemesis before dying. However, he inadvertently places himself in cryogenic stasis during a battle with Iron Man and is lost in space.

== Powers and abilities ==
Justin Hammer is a normal, middle-aged man. He has a degree in commerce and business, and is an extremely efficient administrator with a genius-level intellect. He has access to various forms of advanced technology designed by his technicians.

== Other versions ==
=== Earth X ===
An alternate universe version of Justin Hammer appears in Earth X, where he is murdered by Norman Osborn.

=== Ultimate Marvel ===
An alternate universe version of Justin Hammer from Earth-1610 appears in the Ultimate Marvel universe. This version is an American named Justin Hammer Jr. who is the son of Justin Hammer Sr. and a rival of Norman Osborn. Hammer Jr. secretly funded superhuman testing violating the Superhuman Test Ban Treaty, contributing to the creation of Electro and Sandman. He later dies from a heart attack during Doctor Octopus' fight with Spider-Man.

== In other media ==
=== Television ===
- Justin Hammer appears in Iron Man (1994), voiced by Tony Steedman in the first season and Efrem Zimbalist Jr. in the second season. This version is an ally of the Mandarin who seeks to profit off of plans to defeat Iron Man.
- Justin Hammer appears in Iron Man: Armored Adventures, voiced by Michael Adamthwaite. This version is the 21-year-old owner of Hammer Multinational and primary operator of the "Titanium Man" armor. After inheriting his family's fortune and company, Hammer arrives in New York to buy Stark International, but fails to and resorts to criminal means.
- Justin Hammer appears in Avengers Assemble, voiced by Jason Spisak. This version is modeled after Sam Rockwell's portrayal from Iron Man 2 (see below) and is the designer of various technological innovations such as the Super-Adaptoid, Dreadnoughts and Mandroids. Throughout the series, he makes failed attempts to join the Cabal.
- Justin Hammer appears in Lego Marvel Avengers: Climate Conundrum, voiced by Bill Newton. This version operates the Detroit Steel armor.

=== Marvel Cinematic Universe ===
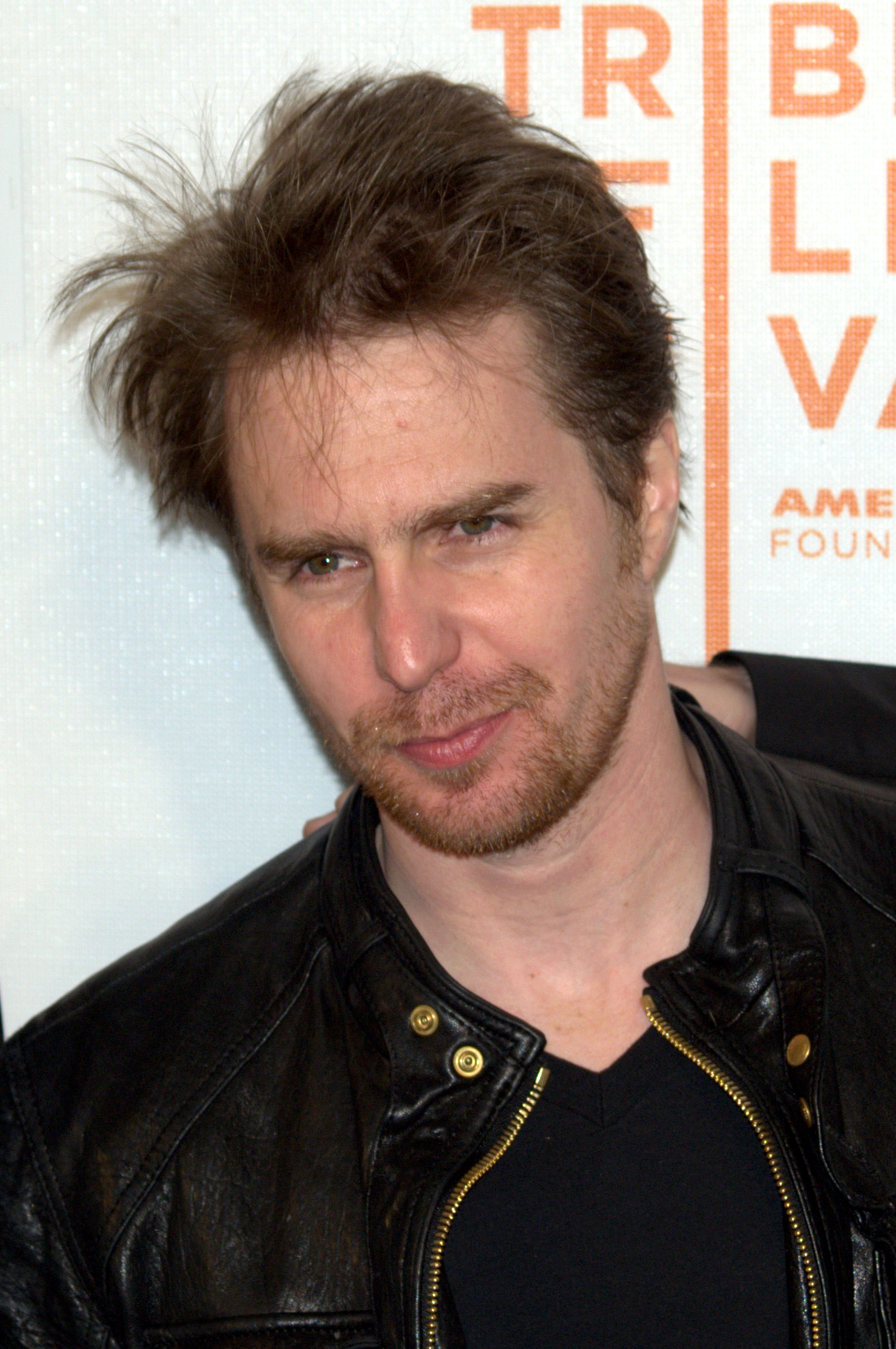
Sam Rockwell (pictured 2009) portrayed Hammer in the Marvel Cinematic Universe

Justin Hammer appears in media set in the Marvel Cinematic Universe (MCU), portrayed by Sam Rockwell:

- Early stages of Iron Man (2008) had Hammer appear as an ancillary villain operating under Howard Stark / War Machine.
- Hammer makes his first official appearance in Iron Man 2. This version is an American defense contractor and rival to Tony Stark who he appears closer to in age. Hammer attends Stark's Congress hearing to discuss selling Iron Man's armors, where Stark mocks him for his inability to recreate his technology. In his quest to best Stark, Hammer recruits Ivan Vanko to build armored suits for him after breaking the latter out of prison and modifies James Rhodes's stolen Iron Man armor into the War Machine armor. While displaying Vanko's creations at the Stark Expo, Vanko betrays Hammer to pursue his own revenge against Stark while Hammer is arrested for his involvement with Vanko.
- Hammer appears in the mid-credits scene of the Marvel One-Shot All Hail the King. Having been incarcerated at Seagate Prison, he has entered a same-sex relationship with a younger inmate and criticizes fellow inmate Trevor Slattery.
- An alternate timeline variant of Hammer appears in the What If...? episode "What If... Happy Hogan Saved Christmas?". After breaking out of prison, he mounts a siege on Avengers Tower with his henchmen Sergei and Rusty to steal Stark's technology and a sample of Bruce Banner's blood, but loses the latter to Happy Hogan who is accidentally injected with it transforms into a Hulk-like monster that Hammer dubs "Freak". Despite hijacking the Iron Man Hulkbuster armor, Hammer is defeated by Hogan who saved him from falling off of Stark Tower and is returned to prison.

=== Video games ===
- The MCU incarnation of Justin Hammer appears as a playable character in Lego Marvel's Avengers, voiced again by Jason Spisak.
- Justin Hammer appears in Marvel's Avengers, voiced by Nicolas Roye.
