= Endotherm (comics) =

Endotherm is a fictional character appearing in American comic books published by Marvel Comics. The character first appeared in Iron Man #136 (July 1980).

== Fictional character biography ==
Tom Wilkins worked as a security chief at Stark Industries for 30 years until he became Endotherm and tries to kill Tony Stark.
