= Raiders (comics) =

The Raiders
- The Raiders battle Iron Man on the cover of Iron Man #145 (Apr. 1981). Art by Bob Layton.

Publication information
- Publisher: Marvel Comics
- First appearance: Iron Man #145 (Apr. 1981)
- Created by: David Michelinie and Bob Layton

In-story information
- Alter ego: Unknown
- Team affiliations: Cord Conglomerate

The Raiders are a team of three fictional characters appearing in American comic books published by Marvel Comics. The Raiders first appear in Iron Man #145 (Apr. 1981), and was created by David Michelinie and Bob Layton.

== Publication history ==
=== American version ===
The American version of the Raiders are first featured in the title Iron Man, when they suddenly appear during a technology trade show and cause property damage until the arrival of the hero Iron Man. The trio skirmish with Iron Man for a moment, with one of the Raiders using acid to damage the hero's armor. During a second battle at a live boxing match, Iron Man defeats all three Raiders. The trio are revealed to be the employees of Edwin Cord, a corporate rival of Tony Stark (Iron Man's alter ego). Cord knew that Iron Man, as Stark's bodyguard, would follow to the trade show so Cord wanted to demonstrate the Raiders' capabilities for covert organisation S.H.I.E.L.D., but Cord is arrested by S.H.I.E.L.D. agents for irresponsible actions.

The Raiders reappear with upgraded suits, during the "Armor Wars" storyline in the title Iron Man. Stark discovers Iron Man's armor designs have been stolen and decides to retrieve or neutralize the technology, leading to a brief confrontation with the Raiders in which their suits are rendered defunct.

The Raiders were later part of an army of armor-wearing mercenaries hired to attack Stark Enterprises.

=== Chinese version ===
A Chinese version of the Raiders appear during The Invincible Iron Man as remote-controlled drones that confront Iron Man once again.

== Powers and abilities ==
Each of the Raiders' battlesuits provide the wearer with greater durability and flight, and offer varying weapons systems. "Raider 1" is equipped with wristbands that can generate bullets, acid and lasers, "Raider 2" is equipped with a net capable of syphoning energy and a protective shield that absorbs energy attacks, and "Raider 3" has two wrist weapons that project and amplify sonic waves in concentrated form.

== In other media ==
The Raiders appear in Iron Man: Rise of Technovore, with their leader voiced by Travis Willingham in the English dub.
