= Whiplash (Marvel Comics) =

Marvel Comics fictional character

Whiplash is the name of multiple supervillains appearing in American comic books published by Marvel Comics. They are commonly depicted as members of Iron Man's rogues gallery. Mickey Rourke portrayed Whiplash in the Marvel Cinematic Universe film Iron Man 2 (2010).

== Publication history ==
Mark Scarlotti first appeared as Whiplash in Tales of Suspense #97 (Jan. 1968). He was killed in battle in Iron Man vol. 4 #28 (May 2000).

Leeann Foreman debuted as Whiplash in Marvel Comics Presents #49 (May 1990).

During the Civil War storyline, two new villains called Whiplash and Blacklash appear in Thunderbolts #104 (Sept. 2006) and #107 (Dec. 2006).

Another female Whiplash appeared in Big Hero 6 #1 (Nov. 2008).

Anton Vanko first appeared in Iron Man vs. Whiplash #1–4 (Jan.–April 2010). He later appeared as a member of the Masters of Evil.

== Fictional character biography ==
=== Mark Scarlotti ===
Blacklash
- Blacklash as depicted on the cover of Tales of Suspense #97 (January 1968). Art by Gene Colan.

Publication information
- Publisher: Marvel Comics
- First appearance: (As Whiplash); Tales of Suspense #97 (Jan. 1968) (As Blacklash); Iron Man #146 (May 1981)
- Created by: Stan Lee (writer); Gene Colan (artist)

In-story information
- Alter ego: Marco Scarlotti
- Species: Human
- Team affiliations: Maggia; Death Squad; Sinister Syndicate
- Notable aliases: Blacklash
- Abilities: Wears a bulletproof costume Wields a pair of cybernetically-controlled titanium whips Carries a variety of devices in a weapons pouch

Marco "Mark" Scarlotti is originally a gifted electrical technician at Stark International's Cincinnati branch, but desires a life of luxury and becomes a professional criminal. With a costume and a sophisticated metal whip of his own design, Scarlotti becomes Whiplash, a weapons designer, special agent, and assassin for the criminal organization the Maggia. On behalf of the Maggia, Whiplash fights the hero Iron Man – secretly inventor Tony Stark and Scarlotti's former employer – and A.I.M. agents attacking a Maggia gambling ship.

Scarlotti is assigned to work undercover for the Maggia at Stark International's Cincinnati plant, and becomes Head of Research. As Whiplash, Scarlotti then has another inconclusive battle with Iron Man and flees the scene, quitting the Maggia. Whiplash, together with fellow supervillains Melter and Man-Bull, is recruited by the other-dimensional villain Black Lama to form a team named the Death Squad and fight Iron Man. The three villains enter a "War of the Super-Villains" to win the Black Lama's Golden Globe of Power, but are all defeated.

Whiplash later comes into the employ of criminal mastermind Justin Hammer. Following a series of battles with Iron Man and other heroes, Scarlotti is eventually diagnosed as manic-depressive by prison psychiatrists. He attempts to reform, but is rejected by his parents and residents of his home town. In response, Scarlotti assumes the identity of Blacklash.

Scarlotti decides to renounce his criminal identity and marries and has a child. A lack of money forces Scarlotti to assume his identity again, and he becomes the target of an assassin, who kills his wife when she returns to their apartment. Scarlotti finds and kills the assassin, then vows to permanently abandon the identity of Blacklash.

However, Scarlotti is hired by a rival of Stark and returns as Whiplash, with an upgraded costume and new weaponry. Several weeks later, Whiplash is killed by Iron Man's armor, which has gained sentience.

Some years later, Whiplash turned up alive and joins forces with his successor Anton Vanko to target Iron Man. Iron Man and Happy Hogan defeat Whiplash, who is remanded to the Vault.

=== Leeann Foreman ===
Whiplash

Publication information
- Publisher: Marvel Comics
- First appearance: Marvel Comics Presents #49 (May 1990)
- Created by: Erik Larsen

In-story information
- Alter ego: Leeann Foreman
- Species: Human mutant
- Team affiliations: Band of Baddies; Femme Fatales; Femizons
- Notable aliases: Snake Whip
- Abilities: Wears two gauntlets containing three spring-loaded retractable omnium steel whip-like cables Costume grants some protection from physical injuries

The second Whiplash is Leeann Foreman, a professional criminal born in Wilmington, Delaware. She is a mutant with unrevealed abilities and used adamantium wires connected to her gloves as whips. Whiplash and the Band of Baddies kidnap a mutant girl and her father to coerce them into joining the group. They force the daughter to knock out Spider-Man and Wolverine, but they quickly recover. The daughter then unleashed her powers, blowing up the warehouse they are in, and defeats all of the Baddies. During the explosion, Whiplash escapes.

Whiplash later joins the Femme Fatales and is hired by the Chameleon to lure Spider-Man into a trap by threatening a United Nations ambassador. Spider-Man defeated the Femme Fatales and saved the ambassador. Whiplash and the Femme Fatales are later recruited into the Femizons, an entirely female organization led by Superia.

During the "Hunt for Wolverine" storyline, Whiplash took the name of Snake Whip and is with the Femme Fatales when they assist Viper in attacking Kitty Pryde's group in Madripoor. She engaged Jubilee in battle before Kitty Pryde gets her and Domino away from the restaurant. After the rest of the Femme Fatales are defeated, Domino persuades Snake Whip to surrender and provide her with information in exchange for a lighter sentence.

=== Whiplash and Blacklash duo ===
Two villains, a woman who is the third Whiplash and a man who is the second Blacklash, appear during the outset of the Superhuman Civil War. Both are past associates of the Swordsman (Andreas von Strucker) and frequenters of BDSM events before becoming supervillains. The duo are forcibly recruited into the Thunderbolts.

=== Construct ===
This version of Whiplash is a personality construct created by Badgal. The construct is feminine and thus tends to possess females. Initially, Badgal used this construct to possess a random citizen, but later used it to possess Honey Lemon and later GoGo Tomago. When Big Hero 6 defeats Badgal, the construct ceases to exist.

=== Anton Vanko ===
Whiplash
- Whiplash (Anton Vanko). Art by Marko Djurdjevic.

Publication information
- Publisher: Marvel Comics
- First appearance: Iron Man vs. Whiplash #1 (January 2010)
- Created by: Marc Guggenheim (writer); Philipe Briones (artist)

In-story information
- Alter ego: Anton Vanko
- Species: Human
- Team affiliations: Assassins Guild; Masters of Evil
- Abilities: Skilled athlete Deep knowledge of robotics Suit of armor grants: Energy whips built into the wrists

Anton Vanko (Russian: Антон Ванко) is a young scientist from Volstok, a village in Russia. Volstok is attacked by someone wearing a stolen suit of Iron Man armor who murders a number of townspeople, including Vanko's father Igor, in an attempt to frame Tony Stark.

Vanko shoots the attacker before he flees, causing the chest plate on the armor to come off. Believing Stark to be the attacker, Vanko uses the chest plate to reverse-engineer a suit of armor equipped with energy whips, and vows to kill Stark to avenge his father.

After confronting Tony Stark, Vanko learns that Stark had been framed by a syndicate who destroyed Volstok to kill an activist who was creating sentiment against Russian prime minister Vladimir Putin. Despite learning of Iron Man's innocence, Vanko makes one final attempt to kill him, claiming that even though he did not destroy the village, his technology was still responsible. Vanko manages to escape, after which Stark is cleared of his charges and helps rebuild Volstok.

Whiplash is later recruited by Max Fury as a member of the Shadow Council's incarnation of the Masters of Evil.

During the "Devil's Reign" storyline, Whiplash appears as a member of Wilson Fisk's Thunderbolts after Fisk passes a law that forbids superhero activity.

Whiplash collaborates with his predecessor, Mark Scarlotti, in targeting Iron Man. Iron Man and Happy Hogan defeat Whiplash, who is remanded to the Vault.

=== Female Blacklash ===
In "All-New, All-Different Marvel", a female supervillain takes the name of Blacklash. The female Blacklash is hired by Power Broker through the Hench App to protect his unveiling of Hench App 2.0. She ends up fighting Ant-Man and Giant-Man (Raz Malhotra) when they confront Power Broker. Blacklash ends up escaping due to Giant-Man's inexperience.

== Powers and abilities ==
Mark Scarlotti, courtesy of Justin Hammer, wears a bulletproof costume and wields a pair of cybernetically controlled titanium whips that can extend to be swung fast enough to deflect bullets, or become rigid and be used as nunchaku or vaulting-poles. He also carries a variety of devices in a weapons pouch, including anti-gravity bolas and a necro-lash which releases electrical energy generated by his gauntlets. Scarlotti is a research engineer and weapons design specialist, with a college degree in engineering.

Leeann Foreman wears two gauntlets containing three spring-loaded retractable omnium steel whip-like cables on each of her arms. Each cable can extend a maximum length of about 25 feet and contains needle-sharp adamantium barbs on the tips. She wears a padded costume of synthetic stretch fabric laced with kevlar, leather shoulder padding, and steel breastplates and mask, which provides her some protection from physical damage.

The unnamed Whiplash and Blacklash have no apparent superhuman abilities, relying on advanced energized whips.

Anton Vanko possesses a suit of armor equipped with two energy whips built into the wrists. The whips are shown to be powerful enough to slash through a metal staircase, as well as deflect a barrage of gunfire. He is also a skilled athlete and possesses a deep understanding of robotics, enough that he was able to fashion his suit from a destroyed piece of Stark technology.

== Other versions ==
Several versions of Whiplash appear in the Ultimate Marvel imprint:

- Marc Scott, a loose adaptation of Marco Scarlotti, appears in Ultimate Iron Man. This version is a Texan businessman and rival of Tony Stark.
- Anton Vanko appears in Ultimate Spider-Man #150. This version is a terrorist who believes that he is on a "mission from God to kill Tony Stark".
- An unidentified female version of Whiplash appears as a member of the Femme Fatales.

== In other media ==
=== Television ===
- Mark Scarlotti / Blacklash appears in Iron Man (1994), voiced initially by James Avery and later by Dorian Harewood. This version is a servant of the Mandarin and competes with Dreadknight for the attention of Hypnotia.
- Whiplash appears in Iron Man: Armored Adventures, voiced by Peter Kelamis. This version is a cybernetic assassin who works for inventor/arms dealer Mr. Fix in the first season and Justin Hammer / Titanium Man in the second season until the latter destroys him off-screen under the belief that Whiplash was blackmailing him.
- The unnamed female incarnation of Whiplash makes a cameo appearance in The Avengers: Earth's Mightiest Heroes episode "Breakout". This version is an inmate of the Vault before it loses power, allowing her and the other inmates to escape.
- The Anton Vanko incarnation of Whiplash appears in Phineas and Ferb: Mission Marvel, voiced by Peter Stormare.
- The Anton Vanko incarnation of Whiplash appears in the Avengers Assemble episode "The Conqueror", voiced by Troy Baker. This version is an associate of A.I.M. who uses whips that incorporate Kang the Conqueror's futuristic technology.

=== Marvel Cinematic Universe ===
Individuals based on the various comics incarnations of Whiplash appear in media set in the Marvel Cinematic Universe (MCU):

- Ivan Antonovich Vanko, an original character that inspired the Anton Vanko incarnation of Whiplash, appears in the film Iron Man 2, portrayed by Mickey Rourke. A ruthless and physically strong technological genius bent on ruining Tony Stark as revenge for the latter's father Howard Stark discrediting his own father, Anton, Ivan builds an Arc Reactor to power a pair of electrified metal whips and manipulates Justin Hammer into providing him with additional weaponry in exchange for manufacturing Hammer Drones. Ivan has two confrontations with Stark, the first time while wearing a harness for his whips and the second with full body armor supplied by Hammer. Ivan is defeated by Iron Man and War Machine and tries unsuccessfully to use the drones and his armor's self-destruct function to take them with him.
- A character loosely based on Mark Scarlotti named Marcus Scarlotti appears in the Agents of S.H.I.E.L.D. television series episode "A Fractured House", portrayed by Falk Hentschel. He is a Hydra-aligned mercenary.

=== Video games ===
- The Mark Scarlotti incarnation of Whiplash appears as a boss in Iron Man (2008), voiced by Zach McGowan. This version is a fired Stark Industries worker who possesses rigid energy-charged whips and can generate a shield.
- The Anton Vanko incarnation of Whiplash appears as a boss in Marvel Avengers Alliance.
- The Anton Vanko incarnation of Whiplash appears in Lego Marvel Super Heroes, voiced by John DiMaggio.
- The MCU incarnation of Ivan Vanko / Whiplash appears as a playable character in Marvel: Future Fight.

=== Merchandise ===
- The MCU incarnation of Ivan Vanko / Whiplash and the Anton Vanko incarnation of Whiplash received figures in Hasbro's Iron Man 2 tie-in line.
- The MCU incarnation of Ivan Vanko / Whiplash received a figure in Marvel Super Hero Squad line's "Final Battle" three-pack alongside figures of Iron Man and a Hammer Drone.
- The MCU incarnation of Ivan Vanko / Whiplash received a figure in the Marvel Minimates line. Additionally, a battle damaged version was released as a Borders-exclusive.
- The MCU incarnation of Ivan Vanko / Whiplash received a figure from Hot Toys.
- An unidentified Whiplash received a figure in a Mega Bloks blind pack.
