= Iron Man (TV series) =

American animated television series from 1994–1996

- The title card for Season 1 of Iron Man
- Genre: Superhero
- Based on: Iron Man by: Stan Lee; Larry Lieber; Don Heck; Jack Kirby
- Voices of: Robert Hays; James Avery; Dorian Harewood; John Reilly; Ed Gilbert; Robert Ito; Jim Cummings; Katherine Moffat; Jennifer Darling; Casey Defranco; Jennifer Hale; James Warwick; Tom Kane
- Narrated by: George Johnson
- Theme music composer: Keith Emerson (season 1); William Kevin Anderson (season 2)
- Country of origin: United States
- Original language: English
- No. of seasons: 2
- No. of episodes: 26

Production
- Executive producers: Avi Arad; Stan Lee; Rick Ungar
- Producers: Glen Hill; Dennis Ho; Ted Tchoe
- Camera setup: Setup
- Running time: 26 minutes
- Production companies: Marvel Entertainment Group; Marvel Films; Rainbow Animation Korea; Koko Enterprises

Original release
- Network: Syndication (The Marvel Action Hour/Marvel Action Universe)
- Release: September 24, 1994 – February 24, 1996

Iron Man, also known as Iron Man: The Animated Series, is an American animated television series based on Marvel Comics' superhero, Iron Man. The series aired from 1994 to 1996 in syndication as part of The Marvel Action Hour, which packaged Iron Man with other animated series based on Marvel properties, the Fantastic Four and The Incredible Hulk, with one half-hour episode from each series airing back-to-back. The show was backed by a toy line that featured many armor variants. Off the heels of the release of the live-action Iron Man film in 2008, reruns began airing on the Jetix block on Toon Disney.

Although only lasting two seasons, Iron Man was the subject of a major overhaul between seasons when its production studio was changed. The result was a massively changed premise, tone, and general approach, which left the two seasons scarcely recognizable as being part of the same series.

== Series overview ==
=== First season ===
The first season of Iron Man involves Iron Man battling the Mandarin and his minions, who seek to steal his technology. The Mandarin's army consists of Dreadknight, Blizzard, Blacklash, Grey Gargoyle, Whirlwind, Living Laser, MODOK, Fin Fang Foom, Justin Hammer and series-original Hypnotia. To combat these villains, Iron Man had the help of his own team (based on Force Works), including Century, War Machine, Scarlet Witch, Hawkeye, and Spider-Woman.

The season consisted mostly of standalone stories, with two two-part episodes late towards the end. The episode "The Origin of Iron Man" recounts a modified and modernized version of Iron Man's comic book origin. This late-run recounting of the title character's origin is symptomatic of what is generally thought of as the season's greatest weakness – despite (or perhaps because of) having such a large cast of characters, very few of the show's heroes and villains were developed, leaving viewers unaware of their personal stories and powers. The show is generally held to have been at its best when telling characters' backstories.

Throughout the season, Mandarin secretly spies on Force Works. This culminates in "The Wedding of Iron Man", when Iron Man realizes that he has been spied on and that Mandarin has acquired enough information to potentially deduce his secret identity. Iron Man ultimately uses a robotic duplicate of himself to fool the Mandarin into believing that he is not Tony Stark.

In this first season, the theme music was composed by progressive rock musician Keith Emerson.

=== Second season ===
The second season had a new animation studio, Koko Enterprises; a new head writer, Tom Tataranowicz; and a new theme composed by William Kevin Anderson. The theme features the repeated refrain of "I am Iron Man!", while showing Tony Stark beating iron plates into shape with a blacksmith's hammer. Stark's longer hair style in the second season was based upon artist Mark Bright's depiction of the character from the late 1980s.

In the season premiere, "The Beast Within", Iron Man is forced to wear a cybernetic plate over his chest to keep him alive after being injured by a missile. Another major change was that Tony could change armors on the fly, represented as vocalizing the name of the specific armor, which would then appear in place of his usual suit in a ring of energy. In addition to the hydro, stealth and space armors, as seen in the comics, several new armors were invented for the series, specifically magnetic (able to generate electro-magnetic charges), radiation (used for situations involving contaminated areas), inferno (fire-fighting), subterranean (for drilling), and a samurai-themed armor that is not shown being used.

Another change was that Force Works was mostly written out of the series, parting ways with Stark after he deceives them in order to work in secret with the Mandarin when Fin Fang Foom was plotting to eliminate Earth. When Stark's counter plan against Justin Hammer, which includes faking his death without the knowledge of his teammates, leads to a disbanding of Force Works, Julia Carpenter and James Rhodes are the only ones who continue to work with Stark.

The Mandarin is given a significantly reduced role after losing his rings. His appearances are reduced to cameos in the cliffhangers at the end of the story, as he tried to retrieve each ring. Prior to finding his last two rings, the Mandarin claims his eighth ring from MODOK in the episode "Empowered". In the finale, the Mandarin, having regained all of his rings, unleashes a mist using the Heart of Darkness to render everything technological useless. Iron Man reunites with Force Works to stop him. In battle, Iron Man manages to reflect the power of Mandarin's rings, destroying them and leaving the Mandarin with amnesia.

=== The Incredible Hulk (1996 TV series) and Spider-Man (1994 TV series) crossovers ===
Robert Hays and Dorian Harewood reprise their respective roles of Iron Man and War Machine in The Incredible Hulk episode "Helping Hand, Iron Fist". War Machine originally stops Rick Jones from seeing Tony Stark, but relents after Rick explains that he needs Stark's help to find Bruce Banner. He later alerts Stark of the arrival of Thunderbolt Ross and a squad of Hulkbusters. War Machine fights some of the Hulkbusters alongside Iron Man.

Iron Man and War Machine make guest appearances in Spider-Man The Animated Series, with Iron Man voiced again by Robert Hays and War Machine voiced by James Avery. They first appear in the episodes "Venom Returns" and "Carnage", where they help Spider-Man battle Carnage. Iron Man later appears in the three-part episode "Secret Wars" in which the Beyonder engineers a war between good and evil. In the end, the heroes win and everyone is sent back to Earth without any memory of the events.

== Cast ==
=== Main ===
- Robert Hays – Iron Man / Tony Stark, Living Laser
- James Avery – War Machine / James Rhodes (season 1, episodes 1–5), Whirlwind (season 1, episodes 1–10), Blacklash (1994–1995)
- Ed Gilbert – Mandarin (season 1), Grey Gargoyle, Ultimo
- Robert Ito – Mandarin (season 2)
- Jim Cummings – MODOK, Century ("The Beast Within"), stand-in vocals for War Machine, Whirlwind, Grey Gargoyle, and Justin Hammer
- Dorian Harewood – War Machine / James Rhodes (season 1, episode 6 onwards), Whirlwind (season 1, episode 11 onwards), Blacklash (1995–1996), Stilt-Man
- John Reilly – Hawkeye / Clint Barton, Beetle
- Katherine Moffat – Scarlet Witch / Wanda Frank (season 1), Rachel Carpenter
- Linda Holdahl – Hypnotia (season 1)
- Jennifer Darling – Scarlet Witch (season 2), Hypnotia (season 2)
- Casey Defranco – Spider-Woman / Julia Carpenter (season 1)
- Jennifer Hale – Spider-Woman / Julia Carpenter (season 2), Ghost (shared)
- James Warwick – Century (season 1), Sam Jaggers, General Hirsch
- Tom Kane – H.O.M.E.R., Century ("Hands of the Mandarin"), Stingray, Ghost (shared), Sunturion

=== Recurring ===
- Philip Abbott – Nick Fury
- Neil Dickson – Dreadknight
- Linda Holdahl – Hypnotia (season 1)
- Chuck McCann – Blizzard
- Neil Ross – Fin Fang Foom, Wellington Yinsen, Howard Stark (season 1), Blizzard ("The Beast Within")
- Tony Steedman – Justin Hammer (season 1)
- Efrem Zimbalist Jr. – Justin Hammer (season 2), Firepower

=== Guests ===
- Dimitra Arliss – Martha Stark
- Sarah Douglas – Alana Ulanova
- Jeannie Elias – Veronica Benning
- Matt Frewer – Leader
- William Hootkins – Crimson Dynamo (first appearance)
- Jamie Horton – Controller, Ghost (shared)
- Julia Kato – Dr. Su-Yin
- Todd Louiso – The Hacker
- Gerard Maguire – Titanium Man
- Neal McDonough – Firebrand / Gary Gilbert
- Ron Perlman – Hulk / Bruce Banner
- Peter Renaday – Howard Stark (season 2)
- Stu Rosen – Crimson Dynamo (second appearance)
- Marla Rubinoff – Elastika
- W. Morgan Sheppard – Dum Dum Dugan
- Scott Valentine – Dark Aegis
- David Warner – Arthur Dearborn
- Lisa Zane – Madame Masque

== Episodes ==
=== Series overview ===
Season	Episodes	Originally released	
Season	Episodes	First released	Last released
1	13	September 24, 1994	December 17, 1994
2	13	September 23, 1995	February 24, 1996

=== Season 1 (1994) ===
No.	Title	Written by	Original release date
1	"And the Sea Shall Give Up Its Dead"	Ron Friedman	September 24, 1994
Hypnotia sinks a Russian nuclear submarine with all hands on board. A year later, the submarine surfaces near Scotland with its entire crew transformed into radioactive zombies loyal to the Mandarin. Introducing: Iron Man, Century, Hawkeye, Scarlet Witch, Spider-Woman, War Machine, Justin Hammer, Mandarin, MODOK, Blacklash, Blizzard, Dreadknight, Fin Fang Foom, Whirlwind, Grey Gargoyle, Hypnotia, Titanium Man.
2	"Rejoice! I Am Ultimo, Thy Deliverer"	Ted Pederson & Francis Moss (story by: Ron Friedman)	October 1, 1994
Mandarin, MODOK, and Justin Hammer revive an ancient and powerful robot named Ultimo. They develop a device to control it and send it on a mission to capture Iron Man. Introducing: Ultimo
3	"Data In, Chaos Out"	Written by Doug Booth (story by: Ron Friedman & Stan Lee)	October 8, 1994
The stock markets crash after a massive failure in a military early warning system. Mandarin and MODOK are using the crisis for profit and manage to brainwash War Machine into turning again Iron Man.
4	"Silence My Companion, Death My Destination"	Written by Steve Hayes (story by: Ron Friedman)	October 15, 1994
Madarin uses Julia Carpenter's daughter Rachel to lure Iron Man into a trap. In order to rescue her, Iron Man needs to overcome a serious power supply problem. Meanwhile, the military accepts a new tank design from Stark Enterprises. Introducing: Rachel Carpenter
5	"The Grim Reaper Wears a Teflon Coat"	Written by Doug Booth (story by: Ron Friedman & Stan Lee)	October 22, 1994
Stark Enterprises developed an advanced stealth jet called "the Grim Reaper" for the American military. When MODOK's minions steal the jet for the Mandarin, Iron Man must recover it.
6	"Enemy Without, Enemy Within"	Ron Friedman	October 29, 1994
When the Mandarin sends his men to steal an experiment boat developed by Stark Enterprises, the endangers the life of MODOK's wife, Alana Ulanova. MODOK approaches Iron Man in an attempt to protect her.
7	"The Origin of the Mandarin"	Ron Friedman	November 5, 1994
After the Mandarin attacks one of Star Enterprises oil drills, Spider-Woman discovered a mysterious black box which seems to reveal the Mandarin's life story. Introducing: Wellington Yinsen
8	"The Defection of Hawkeye"	Ron Friedman	November 12, 1994
The heroes of Force Works begin to suspect Hawkeye of being a traitor. This episode takes place after "Iron Man to the Second Power".
9	"Iron Man to the Second Power, Part 1"	Yale Rudoff	November 19, 1994
MODOK creates an Iron Man duplicate.
10	"Iron Man to the Second Power, Part 2"	Ron Friedman & Yale Rudoff	November 26, 1994
Force Works tries to locate the real Iron Man. Introducing: Living Laser
11	"The Origin of Iron Man, Part 1"	Ron Friedman	December 3, 1994
Iron Man's origin is presented as Tony Stark is captured and dons "Iron Man" suits. Introducing: Howard Stark
12	"The Origin of Iron Man, Part 2"	Ron Friedman	December 10, 1994
Tony Stark struggles to repair his armor while Mandarin's minions and Force Works fight to find him first.
13	"The Wedding of Iron Man"	Ron Friedman	December 17, 1994
Tony and Julia get married.

=== Season 2 (1995–96) ===
No. overall	No. in season	Title	Directed by	Written by	Original release date
14	1	"The Beast Within"	Richard Trueblood	Greg Johnson	September 23, 1995
Fin Fang Foom betrays the Mandarin and he and his dragon brethren try to kill the human race. In the end the dragons are killed and the Mandarin is presumed dead. Iron Man's team leave except for War Machine and Spider-Woman. The Mandarin survives and begins to reclaim his rings. Introducing: Nick Fury
15	2	"Fire and Rain"	Bob Arkwright	Len Wein	September 30, 1995
Iron Man and War Machine fight Firebrand, forcing War Machine to confront his aquaphobia. Introducing: Firebrand
16	3	"Cell of Iron"	Dan Thompson	Jan Strnad	October 7, 1995
Iron Man battles A.I.M. when they attack the Star Well satellite. Introducing: Sunturion, A.I.M.
17	4	"Not Far From the Tree"	Bob Arkwright	Francis Moss	October 14, 1995
Howard Stark suddenly reappears. But Tony's excitement is short lived, because A.I.M. and their chief enforcer Crimson Dynamo are determined to kill Howard. Introducing: Crimson Dynamo
18	5	"Beauty Knows No Pain"	Dan Thompson	Brooks Wachtel	October 21, 1995
Iron Man battles his old flame turned enemy Madame Masque, who is trying to unlock the power of Isis. Introducing: Madame Masque
19	6	"Iron Man, On the Inside"	Dan Thompson	Steve Cuden	November 4, 1995
When Ultimo severely injures Hawkeye, Iron Man must go inside Hawkeye to save him. But a miniature Ultimo is after Iron Man.
20	7	"Distant Boundaries"	Bob Arkwright	Greg Johnson	November 11, 1995
Iron Man heads to the distant planet Elysian.
21	8	"The Armor Wars, Part 1"	Dan Thompson	Len Uhley	November 18, 1995
After a battle with Crimson Dynamo Iron Man realizes someone is selling his technology. Soon Iron Man goes after every armored superhero or super villain, leaving S.H.I.E.L.D. hunting Tony down. Introducing: Beetle, Controller, Stingray, Firepower, Stilt-Man, Ghost
22	9	"The Armor Wars, Part 2"	Bob Arkwright	Len Uhley	November 25, 1995
Iron Man continues his efforts to disable all other armored warriors.
23	10	"Empowered"	Bob Arkwright	Greg Johnson	February 3, 1996
MODOK locates one of the Mandarin's missing power rings.
24	11	"Hulk Buster"	Bob Arkwright & Dan Thompson	Francis Moss, Ted Pederson and Greg Johnson	February 10, 1996
Iron Man and Bruce Banner work together to recover one of the Mandarin's rings.
25	12	"Hands of the Mandarin, Part 1"	Bob Arkwright	Douglas Booth	February 17, 1996
The Mandarin announces his intentions to take over the world.
26	13	"Hands of the Mandarin, Part 2"	Bob Arkwright & Dan Thompson	Douglas Booth	February 24, 1996
The Mandarin captures Iron Man and the rest of Force Works.

=== Crossovers ===
==== Incredible Hulk ====
Iron Man and War Machine (background) confront General Thunderbolt Ross on The Incredible Hulk.

No.	Title	Written by	Original release date
4	"Helping Hand, Iron Fist"	Stewart St. John	September 29, 1996
Bruce Banner goes to Tony Stark for a cure. But a blow to the head leaves Bruce, and Hulk, amnesiac.

==== Spider-Man ====
Iron Man joins forces with Spider-Man on Spidey's 1990s animated series.

No.	Title	Written by	Original release date
First crossover
37	"The Sins of the Fathers, Chapter X: "Venom Returns"	John Semper (Teleplay by: Stan Berkowitz, Len Wein, & John Semper)	November 2, 1996
38	"The Sins of the Fathers, Chapter XI: "Carnage""	John Semper (Teleplay by: Stan Berkowitz, James Krieg, & John Semper)	November 9, 1996
Second crossover
61	"Secret Wars, Chapter I: Arrival"	John Semper and Karen Milovich	November 7, 1997
62	"Secret Wars, Chapter II: The Gauntlet of the Red Skull"	Virginia Roth	November 14, 1997
63	"Secret Wars, Chapter III: Doom"	John Semper, Mark Hoffmeier, and Ernie Altbacker	November 21, 1997

- Tony Stark also had a cameo in "The Spot" episode of Spider-Man.
- Although he never spoke, Iron Man had a few cameos in a few of the Fantastic Four episodes, including the Season 2 episodes "To Battle the Living Planet" and "Doomsday".
  - He also cameos in "Tolerance is Extinction Part 3" of X-Men '97 where he is with Captain America at the White House and protects President Robert Kelly from the Prime Sentinels attacking.

== Home media ==
=== Europe ===
On October 8, 2007, Maximum Entertainment released a three-disc DVD set that contained all twenty-six episodes of the series. Maximum released all twenty-six episodes as separate three-disc sets in April 2008, with each disc also including two Iron Man segments from The Marvel Super Heroes. These discs also came bundled together as a boxset titled Iron Man: The Ultimate Super Hero. The third was also released separately as Iron Man: Special Edition. In April 2008, Maximum released a 5-disc boxset containing both complete series sets for this show and the one for The Marvel Super Heroes segments.

Clear Vision later took over European rights and released a 4-disc complete series set exclusively to their website on April 19, 2010. A six-disc set that was released on the same day bundled both series together.

=== Australia ===
Buena Vista Home Entertainment released the entire series on Region 4 DVD – which spans three separate volumes – on March 30, 2010

=== United States ===
Buena Vista Home Entertainment later released the series on Region 1 DVD on May 4, 2010. This complete series release was made to cash-in and coincide with the release of Iron Man 2, which opened in theaters a few days later, on May 7.

=== Streaming ===
The complete series is available to stream on Disney+ although all seasons are erroneously grouped under season 1, as of the service's launch on November 12, 2019.

== Comics ==
An eight-issue comic-book series based on the show was published by Marvel:

- Marvel Action Hour: Iron Man (November 1994 to June 1995).
