= Dreadnought (comics) =

- Nightstalkers #16 (February 1994): Cover art by Bill Wylie and Frank Turner.

Publication information
- Publisher: Marvel Comics
- First appearance: Strange Tales #154 (March 1967)
- Created by: Roy Thomas; Jim Steranko

In-story information
- Species: Robot
- Team affiliations: A.I. Army; Hydra; Maggia; New Enforcers
- Abilities: Superhuman strength and durability Flame-throwing gauntlets Projectile spikes on knuckles Electrifying touch Ability to cause radiation emission from eyes Freezing breath

Dreadnoughts are a type of fictional robot appearing in American comic books published by Marvel Comics. They are frequently employed by villainous organizations, with various models appearing. The robots first appeared in Strange Tales #154 (March 1967).

== Fictional character biography ==
The Dreadnought is a non-sentient robotic combat instrument originally created by Hydra for use in commando operations. The Dreadnought is first used to breach the S.H.I.E.L.D. Helicarrier in an attempt to assassinate Nick Fury.

The Dreadnought's design and specifications are sold to the Maggia cartel, who build the Silver Dreadnought for Madame Masque.

Some time later, Advanced Idea Mechanics design the Dreadnought 2000, which is stored at Target Technologies in Rutherford, New Jersey.

A rebuilt version is used years later during an attack on London, during which it battles Union Jack.

New models of Dreadnoughts are built by Zeke Stane and used by the Mandarin to attack the Three Gorges Dam.

In "Iron Man 2020", several Dreadnoughts appear as members of the A.I. Army.

== Powers and abilities ==
The original Dreadnought is made from a durable titanium alloy and is programmed to be a skilled hand-to-hand combatant. Its robotic materials, design and construction from a titanium steel alloy give the Dreadnought superhuman strength, stamina, durability, and reflexes. It has limited artificial intelligence, and no capacity for self-motivated activity. It is programmed for hand-to-hand combat in the style of an American boxer and for combat uses of its built-in weapons subsystems. Both major models' gauntlets have flamethrower nozzles, capable of firing a hydrazine-liquid oxygen mix. Its knuckles are studded with spikes which can be shot like rifle bullets. From the modules mounted like ears, the Dreadnought generates a powerful electrical charge which conducts throughout its body's frame and through conducting material. The Dreadnought's optical imaging sensor eyes are gamma ray particle beam projectors which can irradiate a target. The Dreadnought’s mouth is connected to a tank of Freon gas, which allows the Dreadnought a single-use attack of freezing breath.

The Dreadnought 2000 designed by A.I.M. has all the abilities of the previous models as well as the ability to generate water, acid, oil, adhesives, anesthetic gas, napalm, and beams capable of liquefying steel or solidifying gas.

== In other media ==
=== Television ===
- The Dreadnoughts appear in The Avengers: Earth's Mightiest Heroes as robotic drones built by Hydra.
- Several versions of the Dreadnoughts appear in Avengers Assemble; an older design is used by Hydra, a modern design is used by Justin Hammer and hijacked by Ultron, and an advanced design is utilized by Whitney Frost.

=== Video games ===
- The Dreadnoughts appear in Spider-Man: Web of Fire.
- The Dreadnoughts appear in Iron Man.
- The Dreadnoughts appear in Marvel Heroes.
