= Mauler (comics) =

Acronym used in comic books for Mobile Armored Utility Laser-guided E-beam, Revised

- The Brendan Doyle incarnation of Mauler as depicted in Iron Man #156 (March 1982). Art by Al Milgrom.

Publication information
- Publisher: Marvel Comics
- First appearance: Soames: Daredevil #167 (November 1980); Doyle: Iron Man #156 (March 1982)
- Created by: Soames: David Michelinie; Frank Miller; Doyle; David Michelinie; John Romita Jr.

In-story information
- Alter ego: Aaron Soames; Turk Barrett; Brendan Doyle; Unnamed criminal
- Species: Human
- Team affiliations: Cord Conglomerate
- Abilities: Armored suit grants: Superhuman strength Flight via turbines Heavy resistance to injury Internal life support systems Laser cannon on left arm Electric shock generator on right arm

Mauler (an acronym for Mobile Armored Utility Laser-guided E-beam, Revised) is an armored battle suit used by four fictional characters appearing in American comic books published by Marvel Comics.

== Publication history ==
The armor first appears in Daredevil #167 (Nov. 1980) and was created by David Michelinie and Frank Miller. The first character to use the armor received an entry in The Official Handbook of the Marvel Universe Deluxe Edition #18.

The second character to use the armor first appears in Iron Man #156 (March 1982) and was created by David Michelinie, John Romita Jr., and Pablo Marcos.

== Fictional character biography ==
=== Aaron Soames ===
Aaron Soames is an elderly former employee of Cord Conglomerate deprived of his pension benefits by a computer error. Soames steals the prototype Mauler armor in hopes of punishing Edwin Cord, who is indifferent to Soames' plight. Soames has two skirmishes with Daredevil before being killed by Cord's men.

=== Turk Barrett ===
The Mauler armor reappears when small-time criminal Turk Barrett steals the armor and attempts to kill Daredevil. Barrett is defeated in seconds by Daredevil.

=== Brendan Doyle ===
Mercenary Brendan Doyle is hired by Edwin Cord to steal the armor from Stark International (the company of Iron Man's alter ego Tony Stark) and destroy all records of the suit design and history. Doyle is prevented from reaching the records by former comrade Jim Rhodes, and decides to keep the suit.

After his 5-year-old son Danny is killed in a car accident, Doyle kidnaps a young boy named Bobby Morris under the delusion that he is Danny. Doyle is found by Hyperion, who convinces him to surrender.

=== Fourth user ===
Roderick Kingsley sells one of the Mauler armors to an unnamed criminal. This version of Mauler is seen on Kingsley's side when the Hobgoblin (Kingsley's butler Claude) attacks the Goblin Nation. After Hobgoblin is killed by Norman Osborn, Mauler is among the villains who defect to the Goblin Underground.

== Powers and abilities ==
The Mauler armor provides heavy protection from physical and energy-based attacks, boosts the wearer's strength and courtesy of turbines allows flight. In addition to internal life support systems, a laser cannon that doubles as an electron particle gun is mounted on the left arm. The right palm of the armor can also generate a high-frequency electric shock.

== In other media ==
The Brendan Doyle incarnation of Mauler appears in Iron Man 2, voiced by Steve Blum.
