= List of Marvel Comics characters: C =

== Caber ==
Caber is a character in Marvel Comics.

Caber is one of the Celtic gods of Avalon, a warrior god. Caber is a friend of Leir and usually accompanies him in battle.

== Danielle Jones-Cage ==
- Further reading: Danielle Jones-Cage at the Comic Book DB (archived from the original); Danielle Jones-Cage at the Grand Comics Database

Danielle "Dani" Jones-Cage is a character in American comic books published by Marvel Comics. The character was created by Brian Michael Bendis and Michael Gaydos, and first appears in The Pulse #13 (March 2006).

Danielle Cage is the daughter of Luke Cage and Jessica Jones who is named after Iron Fist (Danny Rand), Luke's best friend. Danielle was born with the assistance of Doctor Strange, after the hospital refused to assist Jessica with her delivery. After Danielle is kidnapped by a Skrull posing as Edwin Jarvis, Luke teams up with Norman Osborn to rescue her; Luke retrieves Danielle while Bullseye kills the fake Jarvis. Luke and Jessica eventually hire Squirrel Girl as a nanny for Danielle.

=== Other versions of Danielle Cage ===
In an alternate timeline, Danielle Cage inherits both of her parents' abilities and uses the title Captain America. In that timeline, she is mentored by Madame Natasha. She is taken from that timeline to battle Ultron and then a Doombot, and subsequently teams up with the modern day Avengers to battle Moridun, who has possessed Wiccan. She returns to the present to aid the U.S.Avengers in capturing her nemesis, the Golden Skull.

=== Danielle Cage in other media ===
Danielle appears in Daredevil: Born Again, portrayed by twins Annabelle and Isabella Ivlev.

== Caiera ==
- First appearance: The Incredible Hulk (vol. 3) #92 (April 2006)
- Created by: Greg Pak, Carlo Pagulayan
- Species: Sakaaran Shadow People
- Teams: Warbound
- Abilities: Endowed by the Old Power: Superhuman strength, agility, durability and stamina
- Aliases: Caiera the Oldstrong
- Further reading: Caiera at the Comic Book DB (archived from the original); Caiera at the Grand Comics Database

Caiera is a character in American comic books published by Marvel Comics. The character was introduced during the "Planet Hulk" storyline. She first appears in The Incredible Hulk Volume 3, #92 (April 2006) and was created by Greg Pak and Carlo Pagulayan.

Caiera was born on Sakaar to a tribe of Shadow People, the creators of the Old Power, and raised by their priests to be a shadow warrior. When she is 13, her village is attacked by the Spikes, a spore-like species who mutate the other villagers into monsters. Caiera, the only survivor, is rescued by the Red Prince, later known as the Red King, and becomes his lieutenant. When the Hulk arrives on Sakaar and gains public support as a gladiator, she protects the Red King from him. After learning that the Red King is the leader of the Spikes, Caiera turns against him and aids the Hulk in a coup. Hulk becomes the Green King and he marries Caiera. She becomes pregnant but dies in a warp core explosion, which destroys much of the planet. Posthumously, Caiera has two sons, Skaar and Hiro-Kala, who are born via the Old Power and spawn from beneath the surface of Sakaar. Caiera survives as an energy being, but is later killed by Galactus.

=== Caiera in other media ===
Caiera appears in Planet Hulk, voiced by Lisa Ann Beley.

== Lilia Calderu ==
Lilia Calderu is the Witch-Queen of the Gypsies, the descendant of Cagliostro, and half-niece of Baron Mordo. She and her coven were charged with guarding the Books of Cagliostro.

=== Lilia Calderu in other media ===
Lilia Calderu appears in Agatha All Along, portrayed by Patti LuPone. This version is a 450-year-old Sicilian witch who specialises in divination and a member of Agatha Harkness' coven. Blessed with foresight but in a fragmented manner, Lilia sees glimpses of the future in a disorganised sequence. In the fourth trial, after Harkness, Jennifer Kale, and Billy Maximoff escape, Lilia decides to stay behind as the Salem's Seven close in. She reverses The Tower card, causing the entire room to turn upside down, impaling the Seven and presumably herself. After this, she finally experiences her life in a linear matter, starting with her first lesson in divination.

== Calico ==
Calico (Becca Simon-Pinette) is a character appearing in American comic books published by Marvel Comics. Calico first appeared in Uncanny X-Men (Vol. 6) #1 (August, 2024) and was created by Gail Simone and David Marquez.

Calico is a wealthy American mutant from an affluent family. After discovering her mutant nature, she fled with her horse Ember and joined the Outliers, a group of young mutants pursued by Hag. The group would go on to join Gambit's Louisiana team of X-Men as their students.

Calico has the power of psychokinesis in connection with her pet horse, Ember. She has the ability to communicate and summon Ember, as well as generate psychic constructs to use as armor and offensive weaponry for both herself and Ember.

== Mrs. Campbell ==
Mrs. Campbell is a character in American comic books published by Marvel Comics. The character, created by Brian Michael Bendis and Michael Gaydos, appeared in Alias #22 (July 2003).

Mrs. Campbell is the mother of Jessica Campbell, who grows up to become Jessica Jones. While driving to Walt Disney World, Mrs. Campbell gets into an argument with her husband, causing them to become distracted and drive into a military convoy carrying hazardous chemicals. The car swerves off the road and lands in an embankment, killing everyone except her daughter, Jessica.

=== Mrs. Campbell in other media ===
Elements of Mrs. Campbell are incorporated into a variation of the unnamed Mrs. Jones named Alisa Jones (née Campbell) in Jessica Jones, portrayed by Miriam Shor in the first season and Janet McTeer in the second season. She either survived the car accident or, like Jessica, was revitalized, but either way was disfigured and gained superhuman strength from the subsequent treatments used to heal her body.

== Candra ==
Candra, also known as the Benefactress and the Red Death, is a character appearing in comic books published by Marvel Comics. The character was created by Howard Mackie and Lee Weeks, and first appeared in Gambit #1 (December 1993). She is the archenemy of Gambit. A member of the Externals, Candra is the hidden patron of the Assassins Guild and the Thieves Guild, bestowing great powers to those who serve her.

=== Candra in other media ===
- Candra, referred to as the X-Ternal, appears in the X-Men: The Animated Series episode "X-Ternally Yours", voiced by Shirley Douglas.
  - Candra appears in X-Men '97, voiced by Debra Wilson.

== Cannibal ==
Cannibal is a "psychic parasite" of unknown origins who can transfer his essence from one body to another. After it ended up in prison while in a male body, Cannibal was approached by Klaw who recruited Cannibal for his upcoming invasion of Wakanda so that they can kill Black Panther. In preparation, Cannibal visited a brothel and took control of a prostitute's body. While at Klaw's camp, Cannibal met fellow villain recruits Batroc the Leaper, Rhino, and Radioactive Man. It was successful in recruiting the Vatican Black Knight to Klaw's side. After the airplane that Black Panther was on was shot down by Klaw, Cannibal's host was dying and Cannibal transferred into Ambassador T'Shan's body.

Cannibal later possessed the body of a Wakandan guard named G'Mal who was friends with Shuri. When it found out that the Brother Voodoo he was fighting was a Skrull, Cannibal's host body started to die from the poison as Cannibal fought the Skrull Brother Voodoo in his mind. After the Skrull imposter is uncovered, he is killed with Cannibal still inside him.

=== Cannibal in other media ===
Cannibal appears in Black Panther, with its male body voiced by JB Blanc and its female body voiced by Vanessa Marshall.

== Captain Krakoa ==
Captain Krakoa is a powered exoskeleton and an alias used by several characters appearing in American comic books published by Marvel Comics. It was first adopted by Scott Summers in X-Men vol. 6 #6 (January 2022) by Gerry Duggan and Pepe Larraz. The suit and alias would later be acquired by Grant Rogers. Made out of Krakoa's plant-based architecture and technology, the Captain Krakoa suit possesses superhuman physical abilities, and can fly, repair itself, and grow vines for offensive and defensive purposes.

=== Scott Summers ===
The Captain Krakoa suit was originally designed by Forge for use by mutants with non-combative powers, and was used by Cyclops to keep Krakoa's Resurrection Protocols secret. After the Protocols are leaked to the public, Cyclops retires the mantle.

=== Grant Rogers ===
After he is resurrected by Orchis, Grant Rogers steals the suit and takes the Captain Krakoa mantle as part of Orchis' plot against mutants.

=== Moira IV.8 version ===
In an alternate timeline depicted in Rise of the Powers of X, Kamala Khan wields the Captain Krakoa suit.

== Captain Victoria ==
Captain Victoria is a Spartaxian and the illegitimate daughter of Emperor J'son, making her the half-sister of Star-Lord (Peter Quill). She first appeared in Legendary Star-Lord #3 (2014), and was created by Sam Humphries and Paco Medina. A high-ranking officer in the Spartax Royal Guard, she is loyal, disciplined, and initially follows J'son's imperial agenda. However, over time, she begins to question his leadership and forms a complicated relationship with her brother, marked by both rivalry and reluctant respect.

In the series Imperial, J'son and Victoria are attacked as part of a larger conspiracy targeting galactic leaders; J'son is killed and Victoria poisoned. Victoria's condition later stabilizes, with Peter Quill assuming the throne of Spartax until she recovers.

=== Captain Victoria in other media ===
Captain Victoria appears in Guardians of the Galaxy, voiced by Cree Summer.

== Rosalie Carbone ==
- Further reading: Rosalie Carbone at the Comic Book DB (archived from the original); Rosalie Carbone at the Grand Comics Database

Rosalie Carbone is a gangster in American comic books published by Marvel Comics. The character, created by Chuck Dixon and John Romita Jr., first appears in Punisher: War Zone #2 (April 1992).

Rosalie is the daughter of notorious gangster Julius Carbone. She falls in love with the Punisher while she is engaged to be married to the son of one of Julius' partners. The man she is supposed to marry and her father are killed by her uncle Sal, the supervillain Thorn. The Punisher rescues Rosalie and kills Sal. Rosalie forcibly takes over her family's business and puts a hit out on the Punisher; she fails and the Punisher spares her.

Rosalie faces off against Lynn Michaels – Lady Punisher – while trying to retrieve the Punisher's diary. However, a mercenary that Rosalie has hired blackmails her, threatening to reveal her affair with the Punisher. Carlos Cruz is sent by Microchip to kill her. She escapes with Bullseye's help, killing a rival mobster and a vigilante accompanying Cruz. She attempts to kill the Punisher again – leaving him with amnesia after an explosion – but is stopped by S.H.I.E.L.D. She attends the crime families' meeting and is outraged that the Geracis are partnering with the Punisher. An intense fight breaks out, ending with Rosalie being pushed off a roof by her high school friend Leslie Geraci.

=== Rosalie Carbone in other media ===
Rosalie Carbone appears in the Marvel Cinematic Universe series Luke Cage and Daredevil, portrayed by Annabella Sciorra.

== Cardinal ==
Cardinal

Publication information
- Publisher: Marvel Comics
- First appearance: New Warriors #28 (October 1992); As Harrier: Thunderbolts #67 (Aug. 2002)
- Created by: Fabian Nicieza (writer); Darick Robertson (artist)

In-story information
- Alter ego: Donald Joshua Clendenon
- Species: Human
- Team affiliations: Thunderbolts; Masters of Evil; United States Air Force
- Notable aliases: Harrier
- Abilities: Powered armor grants: Superhuman strength and physical resistance, Flight, Various offensive weaponry

Cardinal a.k.a. Harrier is a supervillain in American comic books published by Marvel Comics. Cardinal first appears in New Warriors #28 and was created by Fabian Nicieza and Darick Robertson. Cardinal has appeared in the pages of New Warriors, Night Thrasher, and Thunderbolts.

Donald Joshua Clendenon is a Vietnam War veteran. While on a mission in Rhodesia, he conceives a child named Valerie Barnhardt with fellow mercenary Amelia Barnhardt a.k.a. "Sprocket". Clendenon is outfitted with a powered suit of armor and takes the name Cardinal. The Air Force breaks Cardinal out of prison, and he and his team go after the New Warriors; they are defeated and sent back to prison.

While attempting to thwart a humanitarian mission in Bosnia and Herzegovina, Cardinal is injured and his armor damaged. Following the dissolution of Air Force, Clendenon repairs the Cardinal armor and becomes a mercenary.

In later appearances, Cardinal joins the Crimson Cowl's Masters of Evil and the Thunderbolts as Harrier.

Clendenon has no superhuman powers. As Cardinal, he wears a suit of powered armor which gives him increased strength, body armor, flight, and the ability to function underwater. The suit incorporates a number of offensive weapons, including energy blasters, grenade launchers, and a tar gun.

=== Cardinal in other media ===
Cardinal appears in The Avengers: United They Stand episode "Command Decision", voiced by Peter Wildman. This version is a member of Baron Helmut Zemo's Masters of Evil.

== John Carik ==
John Carik is a character in American comic books published by Marvel Comics. He features as a supporting character in the mid-1990s series Blade: The Vampire Hunter and was created by Ian Edginton and Douglas H. Wheatley. He was exclusively referred to in solicitations and the first issue as "Bible John"; however, that name is rarely used in other issues. He is one of the last of the Cathari, an order of warrior-scholars who have taken vows to combat the evil forces of the supernatural. Carik appears in every issue of Blade (July 1994 to April 1995) except for Issue #6. The series was cancelled after ten issues, leaving John Carik's story unfinished.

Carik was attacked by a supernatural being of an undisclosed nature, giving him precognition, and joined the Cathari after they contacted him. Carik is covered in sigils that he has carved into his flesh, which gives him protection from supernatural beings.

Blade begins with Carik having a vision of Dracula returning and destroying New York City, with Blade being the only one who can stop him. Carik escapes from the Nyman Psychiatric Clinic, warns Blade, and gives him a witch compass, a device for seeking out the supernatural.

=== John Carik in other media ===
Elements of John Carik are incorporated into the Blade franchise's incarnation of Abraham Whistler (portrayed by Kris Kristofferson).

== Luke Carlyle ==
Luke Carlyle is a character in American comic books published by Marvel Comics. He was created by J. Michael Straczynski and John Romita Jr., and first appears in The Amazing Spider-Man Volume 2, #43.

Luke Carlyle is a thief and con man who has worked his way up the corporate ladder. After the CEO discovers that he is a fraud, Carlyle kills him. Carlyle then hires Otto Octavius, with the promise of making him a legitimate researcher, and steals his mechanical appendages. He is defeated by Octavius and Spider-Man.

=== Luke Carlyle in other media ===
Luke Carlyle, under the alias of The Mad Bomber, appears in Spider-Man 3, voiced by Neil Ross. This version is a businessman who secretly uses his wealth to provide his gang, the H-Bombers, with equipment and weaponry. Carlyle seeks vengeance on J. Jonah Jameson and the Daily Bugle, whose incriminating headlines about Carlyle led to him losing control of his company.

== Carnivore ==
Carnivore is the name of several characters appearing in American comic books published by Marvel Comics.

=== Andreas Zorba ===
Andrea Zorba is a Greek aristocrat who encounters Black Panther while they are both searching for an artifact that grants eternal life. However, the artifact is destroyed as Zorbas and his allies, the Collectors, are fighting over it.

Zorba later discovers the Fearsome Fist of Farallah, which transforms him into a superhuman dubbed Carnivore. As Carnivore, Zorba possesses enhanced physical abilities and powerful claws and fangs. Zorba goes on to join the Exemplars, a group whose members were similarly empowered by divine artifacts.

=== Dick Chalker ===
Dick Chalker is a mutant who possesses a dinosaur-like appearance. He intended to kill every other mutant on Earth, but was killed after being struck by a car before he could start.

Chalker is resurrected by Charon and sent to battle X-Factor, but is killed by Jamie Madrox.

== Bruno Carrelli ==
Bruno Carrelli is a character appearing in Marvel Comics. He is best known as the close friend and confidant of Kamala Khan, the superhero known as Ms. Marvel. He first appeared in Ms. Marvel (vol. 3) #1 (2014). Bruno is a highly intelligent and tech-savvy teenager who often assists Kamala with her superhero activities. He is one of the first people to learn about her powers and supports her double life, while dealing with personal challenges, including a complicated relationship with Kamala and a serious injury that impacts his future.

=== Bruno Carrelli in other media ===
- Bruno Carrelli appears in Ms. Marvel, portrayed by Matt Lintz.
- Bruno Carrelli appears in the Marvel Rising motion comic, voiced by J. P. Karliak.

== Cat-Man ==
Cat-Man is the name of three characters in American comic books published by Marvel Comics.

=== Townshend Horgan ===
Along with Ape-Man, Bird-Man, and Frog-Man, Townshend Horgan is recruited by the Organizer to form the Ani-Men. Horgan has "feline agility" and thus wears a cat-like costume. The Organizer is Abner Jonas, a candidate for mayor of New York City; he sends the Ani-Men on missions to undermine the current administration. Daredevil defeats them and has them sent to prison.

Ape-Man, Bird-Man, and Cat-Man later rejoin the Ani-Men and work for Count Nefaria. Nefaria's scientists submit the Ani-Men to processes that gave them animalistic appearances. Nefaria sends the Ani-Men to kill Tony Stark; however, the Spymaster detonates a bomb in an attempt to kill Stark, accidentally killing the Ani-Men.

=== Sebastian Patane ===
Sebastian Patane is Horgan's successor, who serves Death-Stalker before being killed by him.

=== Ray ===
Ray (last name unknown) is the third person to operate as Cat-Man. He was introduced during the Secret Wars storyline. His first name was revealed during "The War of the Realms" storyline.

== Centennial ==
Centennial a.k.a. Rutherford B. Princeton III, is a superhero in Marvel Comics, notably Alpha Flight. He was created by Scott Lobdell and first appears in Alpha Flight Volume 3, #1 (2004). During Prohibition, Rutherford – a Canadian police officer – is sent to the United States to assist law enforcement there. At one point, his girlfriend Amelia Weatherly goes missing and is presumed dead. Rutherford "buries" her and moves on with his life. He later slips into a coma lasting nearly two decades. Sasquatch, an Alpha Flight member, recruits a new team of heroes, including Rutherford, who is roused from his coma. Rutherford helps rescue the original Alpha Flight and fights the Japanese team Big Hero 6. Later, they fight the criminal Manimator. During his last known adventure, he travels back in time. His teammate Nemesis reveals that she is Amelia. Their post-Alpha Flight adventures have not been shown. A vision in Alpha Flight Volume 3, #12 shows the two buried side by side.

== Centurious ==
Centurious is a supervillain appearing in American comic books published by Marvel Comics, debuting in Ghost Rider vol. 2 #74 (Nov. 1982) by J. M. DeMatteis and Bob Budiansky. In prehistoric times, Centurious was an Amerindian prince. When the demon Zarathos threatened his lover, he struck a deal with Mephisto to fight the demon, becoming a soulless immortal in the process. He spent the next centuries learning magic and living many lives. In modern times, he fought two incarnations of Ghost Rider. He later joined Hood's crime syndicate. His magic proficiency gave him various abilities, including telekinesis, elemental control, and the power to enhance his physical abilities.

== Century ==
Century is a superhero in American comic books published by Marvel Comics. The character was depicted as a member of the Force Works team in the series of the same name from 1994 to 1996. Century first appeared in Force Works #1 and was created by Dan Abnett, Andy Lanning, and Tom Tenney.

Century is an amalgamation of the minds of one hundred Hodomurians who was created to defeat Lore, a Nexus Being who destroyed the Hodomurians' homeworld. He possesses all their memories and instinctively uses the knowledge he needs. Century has a symbiotic rapport with his staff Parallax, which binds his personalities into a unified self.

Century attempts to track down Lore, but is captured by Broker and brainwashed. Century first encounters the superhero team Force Works when Scarlet Witch's magic brings him to Earth following a battle against the Kree. Century helps Iron Man to rescue the team from an unknown world ravaged by the Scatter. He soon joins Force Works on a full basis.

Century is later recruited by Wonder Man (whose ionic energy was affecting his judgement) to join his Revengers in a plot to defeat the Avengers. He was easily defeated by the New Avengers. While incarcerated at the Raft, Century and the rest of Wonder Man's followers are interrogated about their motivations for joining the Revengers. Century stated that he sided with Wonder Man out of sense of honor to him and recognition of the cycle of life.

=== Century in other media ===
Century appears in Iron Man, voiced by James Warwick in the first season, Jim Cummings in "The Beast Within", and Tom Kane in "Hands of the Mandarin". This version is a member of Force Works with the civilian identity Woody.

== Turner D. Century ==
Turner D. Century, born Clifford F. Michaels, is a minor supervillain who seeks to return American to its pre-World War I values. His father's employer Morgan Hardy had been responsible for rebuilding much of San Francisco after the 1906 San Francisco earthquake and was disturbed by the alleged degeneration of manners and mores in subsequent decades. After a failed movement that Hardy started to correct the social decline, he retreated with a young, recently orphaned Clifford as a surrogate son, whom he sheltered from the current world and taught to idealize earlier times.

Michaels developed a hatred of the social changes that had come about since the time-period he idealized, and many of his crimes involved striking out at things or people that represented these changes, including bars and music clubs, which brought him into conflict with Spider-Woman; Hardy died in a fire which consumed his and Century's underground retreat. Century comes to New York to eradicate all inhabitants under the age of 65, but was stopped by Spider-Man and Dominic Fortune.

Turner D. Century is killed by the assassin Scourge of the Underworld along with several other villains in the Bar with No Name. Long after his death, Turner D. Century and the victims of the Scourge are resurrected by the Hood to eliminate the Punisher.

=== Powers and abilities ===
Turner D. Century made use of a flying tandem bicycle, a flame-throwing umbrella and various other high-technological weapons in his crimes.

== Chaka ==
Chaka is a character in American comic books published by Marvel Comics. He was created by Chris Claremont and John Byrne, and first appears in Iron Fist #8 in October 1976.

Chaka (Robert Hao) learned martial arts from his older brother William. He eventually moves to New York and becomes the crime lord of the Chinatown-based criminal gang The Golden Tigers, while his brother William becomes a lawyer. In his battles, he uses electrified nunchucks. He also has the power to control others' minds, which is amplified by a mystic crystal.

== Cynthia Chalmers ==
Dr. Cynthia Chalmers is a character appearing in American comic books published by Marvel Comics. The character was created by Roy Thomas, Dann Thomas and Rich Buckler, and first appeared in Marvel Super-Heroes vol. 2 #6 (July 1991).

She was an archaeologist who has terminal cancer, resulting in a search for Sentinel technology where she's betrayed by her work crew and saved by the X-Men. Cynthia's cerebral transfer resulted in the Sentinel programming reasserted itself and her human body's death, trapping her mind inside the Sentinel until managing to seize control and flew herself into the Sun to prevent the Sentinel programming from harming anyone else.

== Challenger ==
Challenger

Publication information
- Publisher: Marvel Comics
- First appearance: Daring Mystery Comics #7 (April 1941)
- Created by: Ray Gill(?), George Klein(?)

In-story information
- Alter ego: William "Bill" Waring
- Species: Human
- Team affiliations: The Initiative; Freedom Force
- Abilities: Master martial artist, chemist, swordsman and weapons Skilled marksman, boxer and pilot Immunity to pain

The Challenger is the name of several characters in American comic books published by Marvel Comics. The William Waring version of Challenger appeared during the Golden Age of Comic Books in issues published by Timely Comics.

=== William Waring ===
==== Publication history ====
The Challenger is a weapons master. He challenges opponents to fight using a weapon of their choice. He travels the world and becomes an expert in 1,000 different weapons after underworld criminals kill his father. His expertise includes chemistry, "nerve control", and piloting aircraft. Comics artist and historian Jim Steranko has called the Challenger's background "one of the weakest stories ever told".

The Challenger first appeared in Daring Mystery Comics #7 (April 1941) from Marvel Comics predecessor Timely Comics, debuting in a two-page text story, "The Valley of Time", by writer Ray Gill, and in a 12-page comics story, "Meet the Challenger", by Mike Sekowsky and George Klein, under the pseudonym "Nick Karlton". Following this issue, Daring Mystery Comics took a nine-month hiatus, and the Challenger was moved to Mystic Comics.

In Mystic Comics, the Challenger appeared from October 1941 to August 1942 in issues #6–10. His stories were eight to nine pages and were illustrated by several artists, including Al Bare and Sekowsky. Stan Lee wrote "Horror Mansion", Mystic Comics #9, in May 1942.

The Challenger was not chosen to appear with his Timely compatriots in the 1976 Golden Age nostalgia team, the Liberty Legion. Legion creator Roy Thomas considered including the Challenger in the new team but decided against it, stating that his "gimmick" of challenging villains to fight him with a particular weapon was not conducive to a group, rather than solo, story.

==== Character biography ====
Former law student William "Bill" Waring, having traveled around the world to learn skills needed to avenge his father's murder for turning state's evidence over to the district attorney, dons a green costume with a full face mask to become the World War II superhero the Challenger. Through unexplained circumstances, the Challenger "bounced forward" in time to the present day, finding himself without assets, having been presumed dead, and inquiring of the law firm Goodman, Lieber, Kurtzberg & Holliway about reversing his will. The firm puts him in contact with the superhero Captain America, who had found himself in the future due to suspended animation, for advice and assistance. He later becomes part of the federal government's Fifty State Initiative of superhero teams, joining the Montana group, Freedom Force.

When the Avengers and the New Avengers are displaced to the World War II-era and collaborate with the Invaders, Peter Parker sports a green costume and takes up the alias of the Challenger when fighting the Red Skull and the Nazis.

==== Demon version ====
The demon version of the Challenger works as an agent of Mephisto, who sends him to drag the Ghost Rider to Hell. The Challenger appears when the Ghost Rider and Daimon Hellstrom are exorcising Legion from the body of Katy Milner, and challenges the Ghost Rider to a deadly race for the fate of Katy. He defeats the Ghost Rider, but is hit by the Ghost Rider's hellfire attack, causing the spell over Katy to be broken and revealing that she is the cursed form of Roxanne Simpson.

==== Powers and abilities ====
Challenger is a master of weapons, jiu-jitsu, chemistry, and swordsmanship. He is also a skilled marksman, boxer, and pilot. Through Indian nerve-control training, the Challenger can make himself immune to pain at will.

=== Elders of the Universe ===
The Elders of the Universe version of Challenger first appears in The Avengers #678 and was created by Mark Waid, Al Ewing, Jim Zub, and Pepe Larraz.

The Challenger challenges the Grandmaster upon his return from the void following the recreation of the multiverse at the end of the "Secret Wars" storyline. With Earth as the battleground, the Challenger reassembles the Black Order to battle the Lethal Legion. During the final round, the Challenger calls upon the resurrected Hulk, who destroys the Pyramoid in Voyager's possession. The Challenger apparently disintegrates the Grandmaster and makes plans to destroy Earth under the alias of Grandmaster Prime. He fights off Falcon, Hulk, Rogue, and Wonder Man until Voyager arrives with an army of Avengers and defeats him. Voyager imprisons the Challenger at the Far Shore, where he can observe the Avengers. She hopes that Challenger will eventually redeem himself.

This version of Challenger possesses the Power Primordial, which gives him super-strength, enhanced durability, immortality, energy manipulation, and the ability to resurrect the dead.

== Chance ==
Chance is the name of two characters appearing in American comic books published by Marvel Comics.

=== Nicholas Powell ===
Nicholas Powell, a wealthy, former professional gambler, decides to become a mercenary criminal-for-hire, known as Chance. Instead of requesting direct payment, he would bet his fee against anyone hiring him. If successful, he receives his fee; if not, he loses the "bet" and owes that amount to his contractor. Chance is described as choosing this method of payment to feel a thrill from risking his payment.

=== Fallen Angels ===
Chance is a 13-year-old South Korean girl who immigrates to the United States and runs away from a church that is mistreating her. The mutant criminal Vanisher recruits her to be part of the Fallen Angels, teenagers who work as thieves. There, she befriends the extraterrestrial mutant Ariel.

== Marlo Chandler ==
Marlo Chandler is a character appearing in American comic books published by Marvel Comics. Created by writer Peter David and artist Jeff Purves, the character first appeared in The Incredible Hulk (vol. 2) #347 (September 1988).

Introduced as a fitness instructor based in Las Vegas, Chandler was set up on a date with Joe Fixit, a local enforcer who was secretly the Hulk in his gray form. The two developed a brief romantic relationship before eventually parting ways. She subsequently became romantically involved with Rick Jones, one of the Hulk's longtime allies. Although the couple eventually divorced, they later reconciled on several occasions. At one point, Chandler was possessed by Death, granting her cosmic abilities and a connection to Death.

== Mr. Charles ==
Mr. Charles is a character appearing in American comic books published by Marvel Comics. The character was created by writer William Harms and artist Tom Grummett, and made his first appearance in AAFES #15 (June 2013).

=== Mr. Charles in other media ===
Mr. Charles appears in Daredevil: Born Again, portrayed by Matthew Lillard.

== Charon ==
Charon is the name of two characters appearing in American comic books published by Marvel Comics.

=== Mythological Charon ===
The mythological Charon first appeared in Captain America's Weird Tales #72.

=== Charlie Ronalds ===
Charlie Ronalds was orphaned at a young age after an unidentified mutant killed his parents, sparing him. He grows to resent mutants while in foster care. His sole friend is Guido Carosella, who he later learns is a mutant and attacks Guido. Guido inadvertently injures Charlie, leaving him with a limp. Charlie studies the occult arts and eventually makes a deal with the demon Cloot to gain superhuman abilities in exchange for the souls of the defeated X-Factor. Realizing that Charon has no intention of honoring his promise of souls, the Devil arrives and eats Charon.

=== Charon in other media ===
The mythological Charon appears in the Hulk and the Agents of S.M.A.S.H. episode "The Tale of Hercules", voiced by Fred Tatasciore.

== Chewie ==
- Further reading: Chewie at the Comic Book DB (archived from the original); Chewie at the Grand Comics Database

Chewbacca Sassy "Chewie" Danvers is an alien in American comic books published by Marvel Comics. The character, created by Brian Reed and Roberto De La Torre, first appears in Giant-Size Ms. Marvel #1 (April 2006). Her alien origin was invented by Kelly Sue DeConnick and David López for Captain Marvel Volume 8, #2 (June 2014).

Chewie is an ordinary-looking cat who was caught in a fight between Carol Danvers, then known as Ms. Marvel, and Sir Warren Traveler, inside a fiery building. Carol adopts the cat after she turns up at her apartment, and calls her Chewie, after Star Wars character Chewbacca. Chewie is later revealed to be a Flerken, a cat-like alien.

=== Chewie in other media ===
- Chewie, renamed Goose in reference to the Top Gun character Nick "Goose" Bradshaw, appears in the Marvel Cinematic Universe films Captain Marvel and The Marvels. She is portrayed by several cat actors: Archie, Reggie, Rizzo, and Gonzo in the former film, and Nemo and Tango in the latter.
  - In Captain Marvel, set in 1995, Goose is owned by Mar-Vell. She helps Carol Danvers and Nick Fury battle the Kree before being adopted by Danvers.
  - In The Marvels, Goose is now Danvers' pet and is seen living with her on her spaceship.
  - An alternate universe variant of Goose appears in the What If...? episode "What If... Peter Quill Attacked Earth's Mightiest Heroes?".

== Chimera ==
Chimera is the name of several characters that appear in various American comic books published by Marvel Comics.

=== Mutant version ===
Chimera is an interdimensional pirate who encounters Wolverine while obtaining information on him and his feral state. She assists the self-styled heir of Apocalypse, Genesis, with Wolverine's capture so that Genesis can make Wolverine his first Horseman. They attempt to re-bond the adamantium that had been removed from Wolverine's skeleton by Magneto, but they fail when Wolverine's body violently expels the metal, killing most of Genesis' followers, the Dark Riders. Dirtnap – one of the only Dark Riders to survive – team up with Chimera to get revenge on Wolverine. Chimera encounters Wolverine again when he and Venom are lured into a trap set by her and Dirtnap.

Chimera is next seen in Madripoor, killing drug runners. She is approached by the Red Queen to join her Sisterhood of Mutants. Later in Japan, Chimera and the Sisterhood dig up Kwannon's body and confront Domino, who is there on other business. Domino critically injures Chimera but she escapes with the rest of the Sisterhood and Kwannon's body. After the Red Queen heals her, the Sisterhood perform a spell involving Kwannon's body and a captive Betsy Braddock, returning her to her original body.

Chimera later appears as a member of a group of Marauders that are brainwashed to attack the X-Men. As part of the "All-New, All-Different Marvel", Chimera again appears as a member of the Marauders. She assists Aries, Azimuth, and Coda into pursuing Nightcrawler through the sewers to capture him and make him Mister Sinister's specimen.

=== Femizons version ===
An unidentified version of Chimera is a member of the Femizons. She is a shapeshifter who can grow wings, claws, and other parts.

=== Mythical chimera ===
The Chimera of Greek mythology appear in Marvel Comics. It is depicted as a speaking, fire-breathing monster with the heads of a lion and a goat, the front legs of a lion, the wings of a dragon, the hindquarters of a goat, and a snake-headed tail. The chimera is described as the offspring of Echidna, which was killed by Bellerophon. The Chimera is later restored to life by Hera to guard the caverns underneath New Olympus, joined by a Cyclops and skeleton warriors. The Chimera encounters the Agents of Atlas, but did not recognize them as Olympians and breathed fire at them, sparking a fight between the heroes and the minions of Hera. Gorilla-Man forces the chimera to set its second head ablaze, causing it to flail around until being knocked unconscious.

== Chipmunk Hunk ==
Chipmunk Hunk (Tomas Lara-Perez) is a character appearing in American comic books published by Marvel Comics. He is a friend, ally, and brief love interest to Squirrel Girl. The character, created by Ryan North and Erica Henderson, first appeared in The Unbeatable Squirrel Girl #1 (March 2015).

Tomas possesses chipmunk-like abilities and decided to use his powers for good, but was too embarrassed to showcase the chipmunk aspects of his powers, instead focusing solely on his enhanced strength and agility and going by the name Handsome Puncher. When he enrolled at Empire State University and met Doreen Green, the Squirrel Girl, he was inspired to finally embrace his chipmunk side and changed his name to Chipmunk Hunk.

Tomas and his friend Ken Shiga continue to support and aid Doreen in their superheroic activities, during which Tomas started dating someone, news which initially caused Doreen to act weird around him. When Doreen learned that he was dating Mary Mahjan, a girl she had previously befriended, Doreen no longer felt weird and accepted Tomas as a platonic friend.

=== Chipmunk Hunk in other media ===
Chipmunk Hunk appears in Lego Marvel Super Heroes 2.

== Chiyou ==
Chiyou is a character appearing in American comic books published by Marvel Comics, based on the Chinese mythological figure of the same name. The character was created by writer Shuizhu and artist Gunji, and made his first appearance in Warriors of Three Sovereigns #1 (May 2018).

Many years ago, Chiyou was the feared god of war who was defeated and sealed away along with his demonic army by the Yellow Emperor and the Three Sovereigns. In the present day, Chiyou's three seals have weakened, allowing his demonic minions to escape and to find a way revive their master, prompting Fu Xi's descendant Lin Lie to take up the fabled Sword of Fu Xi to stop Chiyou's release. However, Lie's older brother Lin Feng pledges himself to Chiyou and plans to revive him.

Imbued by Chiyou's magic, Feng destroys Chiyou's first two tombs in China while acquiring each tomb's spirit orb, and manages to reach the third in K'un-Lun. Despite finding all three orbs, Chiyou is too weak to be revived and instead chooses to bide his time to bolster his forces. Feng infuses Chiyou's magic with Shou-Lao's chi from his egg to empower members of his army and captured members of K'un-Lun's resistance with a tainted version of the Iron Fist, making them obedient to him and Chiyou. When Lie and his allies free the War Fists from Feng's thrall, Chiyou uses the three orbs to revive himself by using Feng's body as a vessel. Lie defeats Chiyou and Feng regains control over his body. Loki stabs Feng with the Sword of Chiyou, which seals Chiyou within itself.

== Choir ==
The Choir is a member of the UK superhero team The Union, representing Wales.

=== Irina Clayton ===
Choir (Irina Clayton) is a character appearing in X-Men comic books published by Marvel Comics. The character was created by Grant Morrison and Igor Kordej, first appearing in New X-Men #119 (November 2001).

Choir's mutation grants her three additional mouths located around her neck, allowing her voice to project in multiple directions simultaneously. As a student at the Xavier Institute for Higher Learning, Choir stood alongside Jean Grey in opposition to the U-Men. She had also been a member of Cyclops' Street team X-Men to battle against Xorn during his rampage through New York.

== Andrew Chord ==
Andrew Chord

Publication information
- Publisher: Marvel Comics
- First appearance: Thor #411 (Dec. 1989)
- Created by: Tom Defalco (writer) and Ron Frenz (artist)

In-story information
- Alter ego: Andrew Chord
- Team affiliations: New Warriors; United States Army

Andrew Chord is a character in American comic books published by Marvel Comics. He is African American. His first appearance was in Thor #411. Chord is the mentor of Night Thrasher and the New Warriors. He is also the father of Silhouette and Midnight's Fire, and the son-in-law of Warriors villain Tai.

Andrew Chord serves as an Army sergeant during the Vietnam War. His unit, known as the "Half Fulls", deploy to the Bolaven Plateau north of the Se Kong river in Cambodia, where they scout locations for an airfield. The unit comprises six soldiers, including Night Thrasher's father Daryl Taylor, Diego Cassaes a.k.a. the Left Hand, and the fathers of the members of the Folding Circle, encounter the Temple of the Dragon's Breath, where a seemingly English-speaking Cambodian geriatric named Tai restrains them via magic. Tai tells the soldiers of the history of her people and asks the soldiers to mate with six young women in her cult. The soldiers are led to believe that their children will one day rule the world. Five of the soldiers agree, including Chord; Daryl Taylor refuses because he is married.

Chord is married off to Tai's only daughter, Miyami, who he brings home to America. Miyami gives birth to their biracial children: Silhouette and Aaron (Midnight's Fire). Miyami fakes her and her children's death in a car crash to avoid their being used as Tai's pawns. She leaves her children to be raised in Manhattan's Chinatown and disappears. Chord, believing his wife and children are dead, becomes a mercenary and travels the world.

Chord was eventually killed off in the second Night Thrasher limited series.

Chord is an athletic man, but has no superhuman powers. He knows hand-to-hand combat, and has combat training and military experience. He is a good marksman with conventional firearms. Chord also designed the Night Thrasher's original battle-suit. He is skilled at piloting aircraft and operating computers.

== Chrell ==
Chrell is a character appearing in American comic books published by Marvel Comics.

The character, created by Christopher Yost and Takeshi Miyazawa, first appeared in Secret Invasion: Runaways/Young Avengers #1 (June 2008).

Chrell was a Skrull training instructor and commander, and a delegate of Veranke. Chrell is a Super-Skrull whose abilities are of the Fantastic Four (similar to Kl'rt) in order to deal with the Runaways and the Young Avengers to assassinate Hulkling, culminating in his suicide attack which is contained by Xavin.

=== Chrell in other media ===
Chrell appears in The Avengers: Earth's Mightiest Heroes, voiced by Jim Ward.

== Chrome ==
Chrome (Allen Marc Yuricic) is a character appearing in American comic books published by Marvel Comics.

Chrome is a mutant with quantum transmutation abilities who was among the first mutants who joined Magneto as one of his Acolytes and attacked Genosha before it was ruled by Magneto. He helped capture several members of the X-Men, and was one of the Acolytes given sanctuary by Magneto aboard Asteroid M. He later died when Asteroid M crashed, sacrificing himself by using his powers to coat the other members in Chrome.

=== Chrome in other media ===
Chrome appears in the X-Men: The Animated Series episode "Sanctuary" as a member of the Acolytes.

== Chthon ==
Chthon

Publication information
- Publisher: Marvel Comics
- First appearance: As Other: Marvel Chillers #1 (July 1975); As Chthon: Avengers #186 (May 1979)
- Created by: Marv Wolfman; Bill Mantlo; Yong Montano

In-story information
- Species: Elder God

Chthon is a character in American comic books published by Marvel Comics. The character, first appearing in Marvel Chillers (July 1975) and later named in Avengers #186 (May, 1979), was created by Marv Wolfman, Yong Montano, and Bill Mantlo. Chthon uses chaos magic and can warp reality.

Chthon is an evil Elder God who is the writer of the Darkhold and creator of the Dark Temple on Mount Wundagore. He also cursed Scarlet Witch with chaos magic when she was an infant. Chthon first attempts to possess Scarlet Witch after driving Modred the Mystic to kidnap the Avengers. Chthon faces Spider-Woman, Blade, and other characters.

He fails again to possess Scarlet Witch during "Dark Reign", when Chthon inhabited Quicksilver's body, after which he is imprisoned in the Darkhold itself by the Vision.

During the events of "Secret Empire", Chthon possesses Wanda and influences her to join Hydra's Avengers. With members of the Underground and Hydra's Avengers end up in his base, the Ultron/Hank Pym fusion managed to figure out that Scarlet Witch was possessed by Chthon while also mentioning that Vision is suffering from an A.I. virus, and Odinson working with Hydra to reclaim Mjolnir. Wanda is freed by Doctor Strange during the final battle against Hydra's forces.

=== Chthon in other media ===
- Chthon appears in The Super Hero Squad Show, voiced by Mark Hamill.
- A statue of Chthon appears in Doctor Strange in the Multiverse of Madness.
- Chthon appears in Marvel's Midnight Suns, voiced by Darin De Paul.

== Chtylok ==
Chtylok the Che-K'n Kau is a character in American comic books published by Marvel Comics. The character first appears in The Sensational Spider-Man #13 (Feb. 1997).

Chtylok is a 25-foot (7.6 m) tall chicken-like monster with razor-sharp talons, bovine-like legs and hooves, and a large, spiked, prehensile tail, that is capable of flight. It inhabits an area of the Antarctic, just outside the Savage Land. Millennia ago, the Fall People of the Savage Land worshiped the beast, until it went into hibernation.

The hole in the ozone layer has begun to cause the ice around the Savage Land to melt, which wakes Chtylok from its hibernation. It finds its way to the surface of Monster Island and follows several fleeing monsters to the Florida Keys, where it battles the Hulk.

== Caesar Cicero ==
Caesar Cicero is a character appearing in American comic books published by Marvel Comics. He first appeared in Amazing Spider-Man #168 (October 1976) and is primarily known as a member of Silvermane's faction of the Maggia, a criminal organization. Cicero serves as the group's legal counsel, providing advice and representation in legal matters, which allows the Maggia to maintain their criminal operations while evading legal consequences.

Cicero, also known by his nickname "Big C", is characterized by his intelligence and legal acumen. As a lawyer, he frequently uses his knowledge of the law to manipulate the judicial system in favor of the Maggia, helping the organization navigate the complexities of criminal defense. Despite not being a typical mob enforcer, Cicero is a formidable figure within the organization due to his strategic thinking and his ability to protect high-ranking members from prosecution.

=== Caesar Cicero in other media ===
Caesar Cicero appears in the Spider-Man episode "Wrath of the Sub-Mariner", voiced by Vic Perrin.

== Clash ==
Clash

Publication information
- Publisher: Marvel Comics
- First appearance: The Amazing Spider-Man (vol. 3) #1 (June 2014)
- Created by: Dan Slott; Ramon Perez

In-story information
- Alter ego: Clayton Cole
- Species: Human
- Team affiliations: Parker Industries
- Abilities: Genius-level intellect Use of sonic technology

Clash (Clayton Cole) is a supervillain in American comic books published by Marvel Comics. Clash first appears in The Amazing Spider-Man (vol. 3) #1 (June 2014) and was created by Dan Slott and Ramon Perez. The character has a brief criminal career, reforms and works for Parker Industries, and then returns to his criminal roots during the "Civil War II" storyline.

As a child, Clayton Cole witnessed Peter Parker wrestle Crusher Hogan under the alias Masked Marvel. He then begins to work on technology so that he can be like the "Masked Marvel", taking the name Clash. During his first foray as Clash, he comes into conflict with Spider-Man, is defeated, and sentenced to a youth detention center. Upon being released on parole, Clash works as a henchmen for Owl and other supervillains.

During the "Spider-Verse" storyline, Clash works for Doctor Minerva, but is convinced to turn against her. Upon recognizing him and seeing that he has gone straight, Spider-Man offers Clash a job at Parker Industries, which he accepts.

During the "Civil War II" storyline, the Inhuman Ulysses Cain has a vision of Clayton Cole becoming Clash again and attacking Spider-Man. Clayton later meets with Mendel Stromm, who recruits him to attack Norman Osborn and Harry Osborn. When Clash states that he was trying to protect Parker Industries from Stromm, Spider-Man stated that he caused harm with his technology, caused millions of dollars' worth of damages, and violated his parole. However, Clash does not agree with Spider-Man's proposal to discontinue his work on his sonic technology and decides to return to crime.

=== Clash in other media ===
- Clayton Cole appears in the Spider-Man episode "Osborn Academy", voiced by Yuri Lowenthal. This version is a teenager and best friend of Herman Schultz.
- Clayton Cole appears in The Amazing Spider-Man 2, voiced by an uncredited actor. This version is a street thug and close friend of Herman Schultz.

== Cloud ==
Cloud is a character appearing in American comic books published by Marvel Comics. The character first appeared in Defenders (Vol. 1) #123 (June, 1983), and was created by J.M. DeMatteis and Don Perlin. Cloud is a sentient nebula in human form and a former member of the Defenders.

Cloud was transformed from a nebula into a human form by the Cosmic Cube Kubik. Cloud came to Earth and left two teenagers in comas, assuming each of their forms before becoming amnesiac. The Secret Empire brainwashed Cloud into performing missions, but they soon encountered and joined the Defenders. Cloud later regained their memories and left Earth. Cloud reappeared in Doctor Strange's new Defenders, but stayed behind in the Fourth Cosmos.

Cloud assumed both male and female forms, pursuing romantic relationships with teammates Iceman and Moondragon.

== Cloud 9 ==
Cloud 9

Publication information
- Publisher: Marvel Comics
- First appearance: Avengers: The Initiative #1 (June 2007)
- Created by: Dan Slott; Stefano Caselli

In-story information
- Alter ego: Abigail "Abby" Boylen
- Species: Human Mutate
- Team affiliations: Freedom Force; The Initiative
- Abilities: Expert markswoman Ability to manipulate an unidentified cloud-like gas form on which she can fly

Cloud 9 (Abigail Boylen) is a teenage superheroine appearing in American comic books published by Marvel Comics. Cloud 9 was created by writer Dan Slott and artist Stefano Caselli. She first appears in Avengers: The Initiative #1 (June 2007), and appeared until the end of its publication (issue #35, May 2010). She is also one of the protagonists of the 2011, six-issue limited series "Fear Itself".

Could 9 first demonstrates her powers while flying on a cloud in Evanston, Illinois. She is spotted by the Initiative program and recruited into it by War Machine. Cloud 9 is depicted as shy and self-conscious about her body. During a uniform exchange, Cloud 9 accidentally enters the boys' showers and is found by fellow new hero MVP. When Cloud 9 trains with Armory, Armory accidentally shoots MVP when he tries to protect Cloud 9 from harm. Armory is grounded from being a superhero and expelled from the base.

When Cloud 9 completes her Initiative training, she is assigned to Freedom Force. When Equinox is revealed to be a Skrull infiltrator, Cloud 9 kills him. Initiative instructor Tigra expresses concern that Cloud 9 has developed a detached attitude towards killing. Tigra worries that Cloud 9 may face psychological trauma if she is forced to confront her feelings.

After Steve Rogers replaces Norman Osborn, Rogers offers Cloud 9 a spot as a trainer at Avengers Academy. She declines after he tells her that it is optional and that the Superhuman Registration Act has been abolished. She destroys her superhero registration card and removes her costume as she flies away, freed from the Act's requirements.

=== Cloud 9 in other media ===
Cloud 9 appears in Lego Marvel's Avengers, voiced by Laura Bailey.

== Clown ==
Clown is the name of several characters appearing in American comic books published by Marvel Comics.

=== Eliot Franklin ===
Eliot Franklin is a member of the Ringmaster's Circus of Crime who is themed after a clown. He and the other members of the Circus - the Human Cannonball, the Great Gambonnos, and Princess Python - later leave the Ringmaster's service and become independent criminals, collectively known as the Masters of Menace.

In the "Civil War" storyline, Clown is mutated into a bird-like form after being exposed to gamma radiation and joins the Gamma Corps under the name Griffin. Griffin and the members of Gamma Corps later have their powers removed by Doc Green, a new personality of the Hulk who believes gamma-powered superhumans to be a threat to humanity.

=== Second version ===
A second version of Clown appears in Brand New Day as a member of the Hood's crime syndicate. The Clown is later contacted by Zodiac and Death Reaper, who ask him to join them. Together, they attack the Human Torch, hijack the Red Ronin mecha to attack Times Square, and annoy Norman Osborn. Clown, along with Paste-Pot Pete, rob a bank during Red Ronin's rampage; during the robbery, Clown executes subdued security guards. Clown later joins Manslaughter Marsdale in killing H.A.M.M.E.R troops at an old S.H.I.E.L.D. barbershop base, as Zodiac reveals the stolen Zodiac Key to Agent Murphy. Clown is eventually revealed to be Eliot Franklin's half-brother.

=== Third version ===
A third, unnamed version of Clown appears as a member of the Circus of Crime in the "Spiral" storyline. In the Secret Empire storyline, the Clown joins the Army of Evil.

=== Clown in other media ===
- The Eliot Franklin incarnation of the Clown appears in The Marvel Super Heroes episode "Ringmaster" as a member of the Circus of Crime.
- An unnamed female incarnation of the Clown appears in Ironheart, portrayed by Sonia Denis. This version is a member of a Chicago street gang led by the Hood. Following the death of Stuart Clarke, Hood fires the members of his gang, including Clown.

== Coachwhip ==
Coachwhip (Beatrix Keener) is a character appearing in American comic books published by Marvel Comics.

Coachwhip is a member of the Serpent Society themed after her namesake who utilizes electrified whips.

== Coat of Arms ==
Coat of Arms (Lisa Molinari) is a character appearing in American comic books published by Marvel Comics. The character, created by Paul Cornell and Mark Brooks, made her first appearance in Dark Reign: Young Avengers #1 (May 2009).

Lisa Molinari spent time in juvenile detention, where she knew Tommy Shepherd the reincarnated son of Scarlet Witch and Vision. After being paroled, she struggled to adjust to ordinary life and find employment, believing she was destined for something greater. Shortly afterwards, Lisa discovered a mysterious coat displayed on a rack in an alleyway beneath graffiti asking whether superheroes were good. Upon taking the garment, she discovered that it allowed her to manifest four additional arms and fly. Rather than treating the Coat as a source of power, Lisa saw it as an opportunity to explore superheroism itself through her art.

She pursued a professional career in art and sourced materials from Cowley Fabrications, a company that produced art installations and equipment for superhumans. It was there that she met Norman Osborn, who initially admired her work and had purchased several of her pieces; however, their relationship soured when she showed him artworks inspired by his identity as the Green Goblin. Unbeknownst to Lisa, Osborn used the business card he gave her to monitor her activities.

Adopting the identity Coat of Arms, Lisa joined the Young Masters. Lisa conceived the team's activities as a form of living or performance art, using actual superheroics to explore the distinction between heroes and villains and the way those roles were perceived by others. Even the team's interventions in crimes became part of the larger artistic concept rather than being motivated solely by conventional heroism.

=== Coat of Arms in other media ===
Lisa Molinari appears in VisionQuest, portrayed by Lauren Morais. This version is a pickpocket and the best friend of Thomas Shepherd.

== Cobalt Man ==
Cobalt Man (Ralph Roberts) is a character in American comic books published by Marvel Comics. The character was created by writer Roy Thomas and penciller Werner Roth, and first appears in X-Men #31 (April 1967). He has been an antagonist to various superheroes.

An ex-employee of Stark Industries and the older brother of Ted Roberts, Roberts builds a weaponized suit armor powered by cobalt radiation. While giving a tour of his lab to Jean Grey (Ted's girlfriend at the time), he becomes unstable as a result of the radiation from his Cobalt Man armor. Cyclops, Marvel Girl, Beast, Iceman, and Angel defeat him.

Roberts develops a streamlined version of the Cobalt Man armor and attempts to destroy himself and Sydney, Australia, to show the world the dangers of radiation. The Hulk defeats Cobalt Man and he seemingly dies a safe distance from Earth. Cobalt Man is then forced to join Egghead's Emissaries of Evil. He fights the Hulk again, until the Defenders restore his sanity.

During the Civil War event, Cobalt Man is among the villains who battle the New Warriors in Stamford, Connecticut. He is killed when Nitro explodes.

Cobalt Man returns in the series Deadpool & the Mercs for Money.

=== Cobalt Man in other media ===
Cobalt Man appears in the Avengers Assemble episode "A Friend in Need". This version is a robot created by Ultron.

== Izzy Cohen ==
Izzy Cohen

Publication information
- Publisher: Marvel Comics
- First appearance: Sgt. Fury and the Howling Commandos #1 (May 1963)
- Created by: Stan Lee, Jack Kirby

In-story information
- Alter ego: Isadore Cohen
- Team affiliations: Howling Commandos; S.H.I.E.L.D.
- Abilities: Mechanical skills.

Isadore "Izzy" Cohen is a character in American comic books published by Marvel Comics. His first appearance was in Sgt. Fury and the Howling Commandos #1 (May 1963).

Cohen is an expert in mechanical devices, particularly automobiles. He uses grenades and machine guns in battle. Cohen fights Nazis alongside Nick Fury during World War II. Cohen features in dozens of adventures, such as in Sgt. Fury and the Howling Commandos #32, where he resists Nazi brainwashing and helps to destroy a weapons plant.

After the war, Cohen goes home to Brooklyn, settles down with his wife, and runs his father's mechanic shop. He has two sons and one daughter. He turns the family business into a string of car dealerships, which he eventually passes down to his sons.

Cohen signs up for a tour of duty in the Korean War, where he is promoted to sergeant. He also fights in the Vietnam War. In 1972, he is shot at a reunion, and in the 1980s, he confronts a Life Model Decoy (LMD) of the Nazi war criminal Baron von Strucker. He then serves in S.H.I.E.L.D. after it is nearly destroyed by an LMD.

=== Izzy Cohen in other media ===
- Izzy Cohen makes a non-speaking cameo appearance in the X-Men: The Animated Series episode "Old Soldiers".
- Izzy Cohen appears in a flashback depicted in The Super Hero Squad Show episode "Wrath of the Red Skull!".
- Izzy Cohen appears in a flashback depicted in The Avengers: Earth's Mightiest Heroes episode "Meet Captain America".

== Coldheart ==
Coldheart is a character appearing in American comic books published by Marvel Comics. She first appeared in Spider-Man #49 (August 1994) and was created by Howard Mackie and Tom Lyle.

Kateri Deseronto was once a government agent with the codename Coldheart. After her son's death during a battle between the Hobgoblin and Spider-Man, she was deemed mentally unfit for field duty. Her clearance was revoked and she was forcibly retired. Breaking into the government agency she worked for, Coldheart steals her costume, then fights her way out. Later, she waits in the shadows, listening to a police radio that says Spider-Man is confronting the Hobgoblin, who is attempting to kidnap his own son. As Spider-Man swings into action, Coldheart freezes his webline, sending him crashing through a table. This gives Hobgoblin enough time to escape with his son, Jay. Coldheart rushes at Spider-Man, but he easily evades her swords and kicks her in the face, letting him catch up with the Hobgoblin. She fights Hobgoblin on the roof of the building, but the Hobgoblin, realizing he is losing, throws a pumpkin bomb on the roof, sending his son flying. Spider-Man jumps after Jay, saving him, but when he looks up, Coldheart has a blade under his chin, freezing him. Jay begs her to leave Spider-Man alone, and Coldheart decides to pursue the Hobgoblin instead of killing Spider-Man.

Hiding in Stamford, Connecticut with Cobalt Man, Nitro, and Speedfreek, Coldhearwas eventually tracked down by the New Warriors. Seeing the need to neutralize the villains and gain good footage for their reality show, the Warriors attacked. During the battle, Nitro explodes, decimating Stamford and killing over six hundred civilians. Of the villains, only Nitro survives.

During the "Avengers: Standoff!" storyline, Coldheart appears alive as an inmate of Pleasant Hill, a gated community established by S.H.I.E.L.D.

== Walter Collins ==
- Further reading: Walter Collins at the Comic Book DB (archived from the original); Walter Collins at the Grand Comics Database

Walter Collins is a character appearing in American comic books published by Marvel Comics. He first appeared in Fantastic Four #111 (June 1971) and was created by Stan Lee and John Buscema.

Collins purchased the Baxter Building when the Fantastic Four were facing financial difficulties, becoming the building's landlord. Collins was initially happy with the decision, but came to regret it after many of the Four's adventures affected the building drastically.

Collins loses ownership of the Baxter Building to the Maggia group led by Top Man. After Top Man, Hammerhead, and Gimlet are defeated by the Fantastic Four, Collins regains ownership of the Baxter Building.

== Comet ==
Comet (Harris Moore) is a character appearing in American comic books published by Marvel Comics. He first appears in Nova #21 (September 1978), and was created by Marv Wolfman and John Buscema.

In the late 1950s, radiation from a gaseous entity resembling a tiny comet mutagenically alters Moore, giving him superhuman flying and electrical powers, which he uses as the Comet, a costumed crimefighter. Decades later, he goes to Xandar to aid its people in their war against the Skrulls as one of the Champions of Xandar. After his son Crimebuster dies, Comet chooses to remain on Xandar. Comet dies battling the forces of Nebula.

== Consultant ==
The Consultant is an unnamed man who served as a consultant for various villains like Armadillo, Boomerang, and Grizzly. At one point, he used the alias of "Hippo".

== Copycat ==
Copycat (Vanessa Carlysle) is a character appearing in American comic books published by Marvel Comics. Copycat first appeared in X-Force #19 (February 1993), but was retroactively established to have appeared earlier beginning with The New Mutants #98 (February 1991), where she impersonated Domino. She was created by Fabian Nicieza and Greg Capullo. Copycat is a shapeshifter with the ability to duplicate another being down to the cellular level, including superpowers and mental imprints. Copycat requires only knowledge to duplicate a person's appearance, but needs physical contact to duplicate anything else. She is also capable of turning into animals.

The daughter of Dorothy and the late Burt Carlysle, of New Brunswick, New Jersey, she is kicked out of her home and becomes a sex worker in Boston, where she meets and falls in love with mercenary Wade Wilson. Zoe Culloden, a time-traveling agent of Landau, Luckman, and Lake, saves Carlysle when she travels into the past to prevent Wilson's eventual self-destruction. That night, Wilson breaks up with Carlysle after learning that he has a terminal illness. Carlysle becomes a mercenary and works for Mr. Tolliver, an arms dealer.

=== Copycat in other media ===
- Copycat makes minor non-speaking appearances in X-Men: The Animated Series.
- Copycat makes minor non-speaking appearances in Wolverine and the X-Men.
- Vanessa Carlysle appears in the films Deadpool, Deadpool 2, and Deadpool & Wolverine, portrayed by Morena Baccarin. This version is not a mutant, a decision made by writers Rhett Reese and Paul Wernick to avoid confusing viewers, though they are open to exploring the idea in a future sequel. Additionally, she enters a relationship with, and later becomes engaged to, Wade Wilson.

== Gil Corazon ==
Gilberto "Gil" Corazon is a character appearing in American comic books published by Marvel Comics. The character, created by Fiona Avery and Mark Brooks, first appears in Amazing Fantasy Volume 2, #1 (August 2004).

He is Anya Corazon's father and Sofia Corazon's widower. He is an investigative reporter of Puerto Rican lineage. During an investigation of crime lord Jamie Jade, Sofia is killed in a fire, and Gil and Anya flee to New York. Gil eventually discovers that his daughter is the superheroine Araña (transl. Spider) a.k.a. Spider-Girl, with the help of Carol Danvers. When Anya is wounded, Gil files a restraining order on Ms. Marvel to keep Anya safe. Gil is also an acquaintance of the Fantastic Four.

Gil is later killed and the Red Hulk is framed as his killer by the Raven Society organization.

== Sofia Corazon ==
Sofia Corazon is a character appearing in American comic books published by Marvel Comics. The character, created by Fiona Avery and Mark Brooks, first appears in Amazing Fantasy Volume 2, #1 (August 2004).

She is Anya Corazon's mother of Mexican descent, and Gil Corazon's wife. Sofia is a member of the Spider Society, and is killed by crime lord Jamie Jade while Gil is investigating him. Sofia's ghost follows her daughter when she is Araña (transl. Spider) a.k.a. Spider-Girl, dissuading her from taking drastic actions. She also gives Araña's exoskeleton to Nina Smith.

== Tom Corsi ==
Tom Corsi

Publication information
- Publisher: Marvel Comics
- First appearance: The New Mutants #19 (1984)
- Created by: Chris Claremont; Bill Sienkiewicz

In-story information
- Alter ego: Thomas Corsi
- Team affiliations: Xavier Institute; Muir Island X-Men

Thomas "Tom" Corsi is a character appearing in American comic books published by Marvel Comics, most often appearing in X-Men stories. Corsi first appears in The New Mutants #19 (1984) and was created by Chris Claremont and Bill Sienkiewicz.

Tom Corsi is a police officer and member of the Westchester County Police Department. After the Demon Bear carries out an attack on Danielle Moonstar, the New Mutants bring her to the Mid-County Medical Center, where Corsi and Sharon Friedlander, an ER nurse, are kidnapped and possessed by the Demon Bear. The Demon Bear attempts to transform Corsi and Friedlander into his demonic slaves, but he is defeated by the New Mutants. Corsi and Sharon are returned to their human forms, but transformed to resemble Native Americans and enhanced in their abilities.

Corsi becomes a teacher at Massachusetts Academy, a school for mutants run by Emma Frost, where he teaches physical education to the Generation X group. When the school is closed down, he moves back to the Xavier Institute, where Elixir is a student in his class. After M-Day, Corsi and Moonstar are fired due to the loss of 90% of the student body.

== Fabian Cortez ==
Fabian Cortez is a character appearing in American comic books published by Marvel Comics. Created by writer Chris Claremont and artist Jim Lee, the character first appeared in X-Men #1 (October 1991). He is rumored to have been named after writer Fabian Nicieza, who Claremont had tensions with at the time.

A leading member of the Acolytes, Fabian Cortez is a mutant with the ability to augment the powers of other mutants, sometimes to their benefit, and sometimes to their detriment. He can increase a mutant's abilities, rejuvenating them after exhaustion, or seemingly enhancing their power. However, his manipulations often come with a price—Cortez can make mutants dependent on his "treatments", using this dependency to exert control over them. He can "supercharge" their powers to dangerous levels. Cortez is also capable of nullifying the powers of other mutants. In addition, Cortez can heal others by temporarily enhancing their natural healing factor.

=== Fabian Cortez in other media ===
- Fabian Cortez appears in X-Men: The Animated Series, voiced by Jeffrey Nicholls. This version initially serves as the leader of the Acolytes before becoming a follower of Apocalypse.
- Fabian Cortez appears as a boss in X-Men: Gamesmaster's Legacy.
- Fabian Cortez appears as a boss in X-Men 2: Clone Wars.

== Cosmar ==
Cosmar (Natashia Repina) was created by writer Ed Brisson and artist Flaviano Armentaro, first appearing in The New Mutants (vol. 4) #9 (May 2020).

Cosmar is a mutant from the fictional Central European country of Carnelia. She possesses the ability to warp reality around her, which first manifested in her dreams. Cosmar's powers grew out of control, killing her parents and warping her body into an inhuman form with purple skin and an enlarged yellow right eye. The New Mutants save Cosmar, stopping her powers from engulfing Carnelia. Cosmar is taken to Krakoa, where she is initially kept in containment to contain her powers.

On Krakoa, Cosmar befriends Anole, Rain Boy, and Martha Johansson, who all similarly feel disfigured by their powers. Eventually, Cosmar is allowed to receive treatment from Masque, who returns her body to normal proportions while retaining her skin and eye color.

== Cottonmouth ==
Cottonmouth is the name of two characters appearing in American comic books published by Marvel Comics.

== Delphine Courtney ==
Delphine Courtney

Publication information
- Publisher: Marvel Comics
- First appearance: Alpha Flight #8 (March 1984)
- Created by: John Byrne

In-story information
- Alter ego: MX39147
- Team affiliations: Omega Flight
- Notable aliases: James MacDonald Hudson/Guardian
- Abilities: super-strength, flight

Delphine Courtney is a character appearing in American comic books published by Marvel Comics. Delphine Courtney first appears in Alpha Flight #7 (February 1984) and was created by John Byrne. The character subsequently appears in Alpha Flight #11–13 (June–August 1984), Alpha Flight #22 (May 1985), and Alpha Flight #25–28 (August–November 1985). Delphine Courtney also appears as part of the "Omega Flight" entry in The Official Handbook of the Marvel Universe Deluxe Edition #9.

Delphine Courtney is a servitor robot, built by the Roxxon Energy Corporation to serve Jerry Jaxon. Courtney initially has a fully feminine human appearance, and is referred to by she/her pronouns by her creators. On Jaxon's behalf, Courtney recruits several superhumans that were former members of Gamma Flight and Beta Flight, the Canadian government's training teams, who were dismissed after the government closed Department H. She recruits them so that Jaxon can form a personal super-team, Omega Flight, and take revenge on James Hudson a.k.a. Guardian, the founder of Department H and leader of Alpha Flight. Courtney manipulates the recruits into seeking their own revenge on Alpha through an "influencer" device built into her systems. Courtney is unable to influence Roger Bochs, the inventor of the Box robot, who remains loyal to Hudson and the Flight program, forcing Jaxon to directly involve himself by taking control of Box.

Luring James and Heather Hudson to America with an offer of employment at Roxxon in New York City, Jaxon and Omega Flight ambush James while Heather is detained by Courtney. During an attempted escape, Heather damages Courtney's flesh-like facial covering, revealing that she is a robot. Although Omega Flight seemingly enacts revenge by apparently killing James, Courtney witnesses Jaxon's death from feedback caused by Box's destruction; Omega's remaining members are turned over to the police.

Escaping capture, Courtney frees Omega Flight from jail and employs the group in a new plot against Alpha Flight. Courtney's appearance is reconfigured to incorporate facsimiles of Guardian's battle-suit technology and infiltrates Alpha Flight posing as Guardian. Courtney lures the group into a second encounter with Omega Flight. Beyonder defeats Omega Flight, forcing Courtney and the team to flee. Their escape is blocked by Madison Jeffries, a former Flight trainee whom Courtney had not recruited because of his ability to control machines and his loyalty to James. Jeffries attacks using a construct created from an automobile, and Courtney uses one of the future duplicates of Omega Flight member Flashback as a human shield, resulting in Courtney's death.

Delphine Courtney possesses superhuman strength and has a high degree of resistance to physical damage. Courtney has better sight and hearing than a human being's, and possesses an "influencer" that can affect pre-existing psychological conditions in the human mind, allowing Courtney to manipulate individuals. Courtney could masquerade as either gender by altering its underlying structure and could also impersonate specific individuals. While impersonating James Hudson, Courtney also uses technology that can replicate the properties of his battle suits.

== Courier ==
Jacob Gavin Jr (known as Courier, and later Jacqueline Gavin) is a fictional mutant character in Marvel Comics. Courier first appeared in Deadpool: The Circle Chase #1 (June 1993), and was created by Fabian Nicieza and Joe Madureira. Courier is a mutant with the ability of endopathy, allowing complete control over their biological structure, with shapeshifting and healing abilities.

Courier travelled with Gambit back to the 19th-century, where they confronted Mister Sinister. Sinister imprisoned Courier, stripping them of their powers while they were in a female form and co-opting their abilities. Courier later regained their powers.

== June Covington ==
June Covington

Publication information
- Publisher: Marvel Comics
- First appearance: Osborn #1 (2011)
- Created by: Kelly Sue DeConnick; Emma Rios

In-story information
- Alter ego: Theresa June Covington
- Species: Human mutate
- Team affiliations: Dark Avengers
- Notable aliases: Toxie Doxie, Scarlet Witch
- Abilities: Antiseptic breath Bones that soften to diffuse impact Glands that distribute megadoses of Relaxin; Deliver neurotoxin via her razor sharp fingernails

June Covington a.k.a. Toxie Doxie is a character appearing in American comic books published by Marvel Comics. Covington first appears in the first issue of the 2011 Osborn limited series and was created by Kelly Sue DeConnick and Emma Rios. She began appearing as a regular character in the Dark Avengers series, beginning with Dark Avengers #175.

June Covington is introduced as a postgrad student who is bored with her life working at a university. She develops an interest in eliminating genetic imperfections and becomes a scientist. Eventually, after testing, she perfects her own genetics. After killing 18 people during a prayer meeting for special needs children, Covington is apprehended and incarcerated in a secret government base underwater. While imprisoned, she meets fellow inmates Norman Osborn, Ai Apaec, Kingmaker, and Carny Rives, with whom she plans to break out. After they secure an escape pod and make their way to the surface, Covington becomes Osborn's doctor.

Covington becomes a member of the second incarnation of Norman Osborn's Dark Avengers as the Scarlet Witch.

Covington has antiseptic breath, bones that soften to diffuse impact, and glands that distribute megadoses of Relaxin to allow her joints to dislocate with ease. She has a neurotoxin in her blood to which she is immune, and which she delivers using her razor-sharp fingernails. She also possesses surgically implanted gills.

=== June Covington in other media ===
June Covington makes a minor appearance in the novel New Avengers: Breakout as an escapee of the Raft.

== Cr'reee ==
Cr'reee is a character appearing in American comic books published by Marvel Comics. Cr'reee is mostly associated with the X-Men line of comics as a member of the intergalactic pirates, the Starjammers. Created by Chris Claremont and Dave Cockrum, the character first appeared in X-Men #104 (January 1977).

Cr'reee is a mammal-like alien and the pet of fellow Starjammers member Ch'od.

=== Cr'reee in other media ===
- Cr'reee makes non-speaking appearances in X-Men: The Animated Series as a member of the Starjammers.
- Marvel Legends created a figure of Cr'reee for the 2023 Ch'od Build-a-Figure wave.

== Crescent and Io ==
Crescent (Dan Bi) and Io are a characters appearing in American comic books publisher Marvel Comics. The characters first appeared in the video game Marvel Future Fight in 2018 alongside Luna Snow and made her comic book debut in War of the Realms: New Agents of Atlas #1 in 2019 alongside Luna Snow. was created by Greg Pak and Gang Hyuk Lim. In 2019, Crescent and Io made her debut in the comics.

Dan Bi is the daughter of an antique shop owner. The antique shop had not been faring well, leading to her parents splitting up. One day after Tae Kwon Do class, Dan Bi returned home to see her father's shop in ruins, her father nowhere to be found. Bounty hunters entered the building and hearing them, she hid under a bed, finding the mask that contained the bear spirit Io. Her father was running a black market for antiques and had been kidnapped. On the quest to search for her father, Dan Bi went after the buyer of an artefact, leading her to Jimmy Woo, who had bought the artefact with the intentions of recruiting her for the Agents of Atlas.

Crescent, along with Io, helped her fellow South Koreans as she fought against the forces of Fire Demons from the realm of Muspelheim. Crescent used the power of her mask to help dodge against the fire blasts coming from the demons, but flew away after she became overwhelmed by the number of them. After the Agents of Atlas showed up, Brawn who was among them was recognized as a criminal by White Fox so Crescent called upon Io and the both of them did an uppercut to Brawn which left him flying in the air.

Because of her young age and inexperience, Jimmy Woo sends Crescent to Mumbai to enroll in the Pan-Asian School for the Unusually Gifted.

== H. Warren Craddock ==
H. Warren Craddock is a character appearing in American comic books published by Marvel Comics. The character, created by Roy Thomas and Sal Buscema, first appeared in Avengers #92 (September 1971).

He is a politician who was subdued and impersonated by a Skrull Craddock in order to be involved with the Alien Activities Commission to manipulate public views on Captain Marvel, and utilize political tactics against the Avengers and Fantastic Four. After the Skrull posing as Craddock was exposed by Rick Jones and beaten to death by an angry mob caused from his anti-alien instigations, the real Craddock was located by Nick Fury.

=== Skrull imposter ===
A Skrull imposter of H. Warren Craddock was created by Stan Lee and Jack Kirby, and first appeared in Fantastic Four #2 (September 1961) . He was among a group who impersonated the Fantastic Four. Three were hypnotized into taking the forms of cows, with one of them escaping. The Skrull impersonated Craddock in order to be involved with the Alien Activities Commission to manipulate public views on Captain Marvel, and utilize political tactics against the Avengers and Fantastic Four. The Skrull posing as Craddock was exposed by Rick Jones's Destiny Force and beaten to death by an angry mob caused from his anti-alien instigations. The Avengers later learned of this trickery.

== Crime Master ==
The Crime Master (sometimes spelled Crime-Master) is a character appearing in American comic books published by Marvel Comics. The character is depicted as an example of the professional-criminal type, and an enemy of Spider-Man. Created and designed by artist and plotter Steve Ditko with writer and editor Stan Lee, he first appeared in The Amazing Spider-Man #26 (July 1965).

=== Nicholas Lewis Sr. ===
Nicholas "Lucky" Lewis was a masked criminal who attempted to organize all non-Maggia New York City crime gangs under his control. He was opposed by Spider-Man, Frederick Foswell, and especially his chief rival, the Green Goblin whose real name of Norman Osborn he had found out. The Crime-Master's attempt to build a criminal empire failed when Foswell informed the police about a large crime boss gathering the Crime-Master had organized. Seeking revenge on Foswell, he prepared to assassinate Spider-Man, J. Jonah Jameson, and Foswell at the Daily Bugle, but he was instead killed by the police waiting for him there upon Foswell's tip-off.

=== Nicholas Lewis Jr. ===
Nicholas Lewis Jr. is the son of the original Crime-Master. He met Janice Foswell, the daughter of the original Big Man, during his education period in Europe and they became engaged. After learning that both their fathers died due to alleged involvement by Spider-Man, Lewis decided to take up his father's identity as the Crime Master to avenge his death. Unknowingly, Janice also had the same idea and disguised herself as the new Big Man. Both met and joined up to battle Spider-Man, the Human Torch and the Sons of the Tiger; but when they got into an argument about who was in charge, Janice was fatally shot by Nick. When their identities were revealed, Nick broke down in tears and was subsequently left for the police. Since then, he has apparently remained in prison.

=== Bennett Brant ===
Bennett Brant is the brother of Betty Brant. He ended up in a gambling debt with gangster Blackie Gaxton to pay for his mother's medical bills. With the help of Doctor Octopus, Gaxton kidnapped Bennett and Betty as insurance against anyone who wanted to prevent him from leaving the country. Bennett was double-crossed by Gaxton who refused to free him of any debts. Blackie was fatally shot during a melee between Gaxton's gang, Doctor Octopus, and Spider-Man.

Many years later, a new Crime-Master appeared in the Venom series. He proved to be a shrewd planner, with substantial resources and many henchmen. His paths first crossed with Eugene "Flash" Thompson, the most recent host of the Venom symbiote, when Flash was sent to stop a mad scientist who had developed powerful Antarctic Vibranium bullets for the Crime-Master.

The Crime-Master subsequently organized his own team to destroy Venom, which he called the Savage Six. It consisted of himself, Jack-O-Lantern, Human Fly, Death Adder, Megatak, and Toxin. When Betty Brant was brought before the Crime-Master, she was shocked when the Crime Master revealed himself to be her own brother who invited Betty to join him in killing Venom. After his unmasking, Brant claimed that the Crime-Master identity went back centuries, and that the bearer of it was chosen by an enigmatic criminal empire. After Venom arrived at his hideout, Bennett almost killed him with a sonic pistol and a flamethrower, but he was shot and killed by Betty.

=== Impostor Crime Master ===
Venom later came across another Crime Master who was smuggling weapons into the city. Venom fights this Crime Master and notices that he is acting differently. At the same time, the Superior Spider-Man (Otto Octavius's mind in Spider-Man's body) gets a call from Spider-Island 2 about Venom and the Crime Master and proceeds to have a small army assemble outside the building in which they are fighting. The Superior Spider-Man breaks into the building just as the Crime Master takes off his mask. It is revealed that the man under the mask is an unnamed Maggia operative who had bought the Crime Master identity and gear from Hobgoblin.

During the Civil War II storyline, the Crime Master joins the Kingpin's organization and is killed by one of Fisk's enemies, who defaces his corpse with a sign that reads "It's Not Your City".

=== Inner Demons version ===
One of Mister Negative's Inner Demons impersonates the Hobgoblin's Crime Master to manipulate the Black Cat and the Enforcers into helping him break into Ryker's Island, where he tries to assassinate Hammerhead and Tombstone. The plan is foiled by Spider-Man and Wraith.

=== Fifth Crime Master ===
An unidentified Crime Master worked closely with Madame Masque as they both share the struggle of Kingpin's mayoral rule over New York City. He is among the crime bosses who are tasked by Wilson Fisk to target Boomerang, who is reported to have part of the Tablet of Life and Time.

== Crimebuster ==
Crimebuster is the name of three characters appearing in American comic books published by Marvel Comics. The first version first appeared in Nova #13 (September 1977), and was created by Marv Wolfman, Sal Buscema, and Joe Sinnott. The character subsequently appears in Fantastic Four #206 (May 1979), #208-209 (July–August 1979), and was killed in ROM #24 (November 1981).

=== Frank Moore ===
Frank Moore was born in Brooklyn, New York. Believing his father, the Comet, was killed by an assassin, Frank decides to follow in his footsteps and gain vengeance on the criminal underworld, fighting crime as the costumed Crimebuster. Later reunited with his father, Crimebuster joins the Champions of Xandar and aids them in their war against the Skrulls. Crimebuster is killed by a Skrull.

Crimebuster had no superhuman powers, but was a gifted athlete and a master of various weaponry. Among his devices were a rope gun and a single-seated hover vehicle.

=== Eugene Mason ===
Eugene Mason first appeared in Power Man and Iron Fist #105 (May 1984), and was created by Kurt Busiek and Richard Howell.

Mason was a criminal who encountered Power Man in Seagate Penitentiary. After escaping prison, Mason found Franke Moore's abandoned equipment and became the new Crime-Buster as a mercenary. He became a rival hero-for-hire to Power Man and Iron Fist for a short while. Mason is later killed by former Heroes for Hire secretary Jennifer Royce.

=== Third version ===
An unidentified third incarnation of Crimebuster appears in Avengers: The Initiative as a member of the Cavalry.

== Crimson Pirates ==
The Crimson Pirates are a supervillain group and minor recurring adversaries of the X-Men appearing in American comic books published by Marvel Comics. The team and its members were created by Chris Claremont and Adam Kubert, and first appear in Uncanny X-Men #384 (July 2000).

The Crimson Pirates are a team of superpowered mercenaries and slavehunters, mostly under the employ of the interdimensional slave trader Tullamore Voge. Its membership includes the following individuals:

- Killian, the red-hued leader of the Pirates who wears highly resilient armor equipped with energy blasters.
- Bloody Bess, a silver-haired human-like woman, and the team's telepath.
- Broadside, a huge, green-skinned male who acts as the team's heavy weapons specialist.
- the Sea Dogs, a group of identical green-skinned males who share a group empathy, enabling them to coordinate their actions, and act as the grunts of the team. With their constantly changing numbers shown, it is likely that there may be only one Sea Dog who is capable of self-multiplication.

The Crimson Pirates first came into conflict with the X-Men after their employer Tullamore Voge was captured by Gambit and the Russian authorities. The Pirates executed a prison break and temporarily captured several X-Men, who broke free and defeated the slavers. Later, Nightcrawler and Scorpion Boy were forced to battle the Pirates when they attempted to kidnap mutant prodigy Ziggy Karst, who was subsequently sheltered at the Jean Grey School for Higher Learning. During that fight, Nightcrawler and Bess developed an interest in each other.

Shortly afterwards, the Pirates accidentally released the Shadow King from his internment, who quickly possessed most of the team. Bess turned to Nightcrawler for help, and the Pirates were freed, but in return they kidnapped Scorpion Boy and Ziggy, who had been accidentally dragged along, and fatally wounded Nightcrawler, whereupon the infuritated Bess quit the team. The remaining Pirates took the two children to Voge's slave market, where they escaped, and as punishment for their failure, Voge promptly sold the Pirates themselves off as slaves. After a recovered Nightcrawler and Bess invaded the slave market and defeated Voge, Bess left to search for her former teammates' whereabouts.

== Augustine Cross ==
Augustine Cross

Publication information
- Publisher: Marvel Comics
- First appearance: Iron Man #145 (April 1981)
- Created by: David Michelinie; John Romita Jr.

In-story information
- Species: Human
- Team affiliations: Cross Technological Enterprises

Augustine Cross is a character appearing in American comic books published by Marvel Comics. The character, created by David Michelinie and John Romita Jr., first appears in Iron Man #145 (April 1981). He is Darren Cross's son and Crossfire's second cousin.

Cross takes over as the CEO of his family business, Cross Technological Enterprises, after his father's death. He attends the 24th annual Conclave of Electronics Engineers and Innovators, rubbing shoulders with various representatives of Stark Industries, S.H.I.E.L.D., Cord Conglomerate, and Roxxon. Cross is thought to be connected with the Raiders' attacks, for which Edwin Cord is actually responsible.

Cross kidnaps Erica Sondheim to transplant a new heart into his father's cryogenically preserved body. He enlists Crossfire's aid to kidnap Cassie Lang, believing that her Pym Particle-irradiated heart can sustain his father's condition. Ant-Man and Darren fight while Sondheim transplants another heart into Cassie, and Augustine arrives to save Darren, whose body shrinks as a result of the Pym Particles.

After Darren refuses to invest in Power Broker's Hench App, Augustine hires Machinesmith to hack into Power Broker's database so that the Cross family can steal an algorithm to create a Hench App knock-off, Lackey. Augustine goes into a coma when Ant-Man and Stinger fight Darren and Crossfire. His hospitalization leads his father to recruit Egghead and seek vengeance as Yellowjacket.

== Elijah Cross ==
Elijah Cross is a character appearing in American comic books published by Marvel Comics. He was created by Peter David and Khoi Pham, and first appeared in X-Factor vol. 3 #17 as a de-powered mutant, who lost his powers as a result of M-Day.

Elijah Cross is the leader of the terrorist group of former mutants called X-Cell, who believe mutants lost their powers as a result of a government conspiracy. Cross was to be apprehended by S.H.I.E.L.D. to face allegations of sending a government official a toy elephant that nearly choked him to death, but Rictor and Wolfsbane intervened, believing the agents to be the criminals in the altercation. Afterwards, Cross went to former mutant Quicksilver, asking him if he could return his powers to him using the Terrigen Crystals embedded in Quicksilver's skin. Cross regained his powers for a short time afterward and used them to fight X-Factor. In the middle of the fight, Cross exploded as a side effect of the Terrigen Mists.

Elijah Cross had the ability to increase his mass without being constrained by gravity, allowing him to move at speeds normal to a person of his regular body weight. He was depicted bowling through a small army of Jamie Madrox's clones.

== Crossfire ==
Crossfire (William Cross) is a character appearing in American comic books published by Marvel Comics. Crossfire first appears in Marvel Two-in-One #52 (1979) and was created by writer Steven Grant and artist Jim Craig.

William Cross was born in Madison, Wisconsin. He becomes an interrogation expert for the CIA. While building his own rogue covert operation group, he romances federal corrections officer Rozalyn Backus, with whom he develops ultrasonic brainwashing technology. Backus, unaware of Cross's illicit activities, becomes engaged to him, until Cross steals the technology and disappears, faking his own death and framing Backus for murder. After surviving an attempt on his life, which costs him his left eye and his left ear, he replaces them with cybernetic implants and becomes a prosperous high-tech freelancer known as "Crossfire".

Crossfire has no superhuman powers. He is a former CIA operative with expert marksman abilities, proficient unarmed combat skills, and extensive espionage training. He is also a master of brainwashing techniques, for which he has developed technology. Crossfire is an expert in the field of robotics and cybernetics, and has specialized knowledge of applied ultrasonics. Crossfire creates the "undertaker" machine, a brainwashing device which employs ultrasonic waves to stimulate rage in the emotion centers of his victims' brains. After an explosion causes Crossfire to lose his left eye and left ear, and sustain 85% loss of hearing in his right ear, he replaces his left eye with an infrared imaging device, which allows him to see in total darkness, and his left ear with an audio sensor that is more sensitive than the human ear. As a result of the loss of natural hearing in his right ear, Crossfire is unaffected by his own ultrasonic technology. His costume is made of Kevlar and has hidden compartments containing various weapons and devices. Crossfire uses twin handguns and a sniper rifle as his weapons of choice.

=== Crossfire in other media ===
- William Cross appears in The Avengers: Earth's Mightiest Heroes episode "To Steal an Ant-Man", voiced by Neil Ross. This version is a former criminal partner of Scott Lang.
- Crossfire appears in Lego Marvel Super Heroes 2 via the "Ant Man and the Wasp" DLC pack.
- Crossfire appears in Marvel Avengers Alliance 2.

== Crosta ==
Crosta is a character appearing in American comic books published by Marvel Comics. He first appears in Dark Reign: The Cabal #1 (April 2009), and was created by Kieron Gillen and Carmine Di Giandomenico.

Crosta is an Atlantean mutant with the ability to create shockwaves from his body, as well as Atlantean physiology. When his mutant powers emerged, he was ordered by Namor to attend the mutant school run by the X-Men in San Francisco. Crosta would go onto join the X-Men in Utopia, attend the Jean Grey School for Higher Learning, and relocate to Krakoa.

== Crule ==
Crule is a character appearing in American comic books published by Marvel Comics. He first appears in X-Force #12.

Crule is a member of a rare subspecies of mutant immortals called Externals. According to Gideon, during World War II he worked in a concentration camp, happily operating a gas chamber. He is an ancient berserker, dressing like a barbarian and old enough to remember deities Mitra and Ishtar who were primarily worshiped in the Hyborian Age. Crule is sent by Gideon to attack X-Force after they rescue Sunspot. Crule is blasted out of X-Force's ship by Rictor and falls a few thousand feet, which puts him in a body cast.

Crule is immortal, and is capable of resurrecting himself from death. He also shares a telepathic link with his fellow Externals. He has enhanced senses, strength, durability, and a healing factor. His body has natural weapons, including hair coiled into whip-like braids, fangs, and claws. Weapons in a spiked ball attached to the end of his braided hair, and gauntlet-covered claws.

== Cutthroat ==
Cutthroat is the name of several characters appearing in American comic books published by Marvel Comics.

=== Danny Leighton ===
Danny Leighton was born in Austin, Texas. As a young man, he is a member of the Savage Crims, a New York street gang. He becomes an assassin and is hired by Amos Jardine to kill Spider-Man in his first high-profile job, replacing Arcade. After Nightcrawler learns of the plan, Cutthroat battles him and Spider-Man; they defeat him with secret assistance from Arcade.

Many years later, he defeats Mangler and Lady Deathstrike in a fight to the death to be the Red Skull's new chief operative, replacing Crossbones. When Crossbones returns, Cutthroat fears that he will be replaced and plans to kill Crossbones in his sleep. However, Mother Night alerts Crossbones, allowing him to slit Cutthroat's throat. The Red Skull inspects Cutthroat's corpse, but Cutthorat lives through unknown circumstances. He becomes an inmate on the Raft, which he escapes with other convicts.

=== Hobgoblin's Cutthroat ===
Roderick Kingsley sells one of Cutthroat's old costumes to an unnamed criminal, who becomes the second Cutthroat.

== Cybelle ==
Cybelle is a character appearing in American comic books published by Marvel Comics. The character was created by Chris Claremont, John Romita Jr., and Bret Blevins, and made her first appearance in Uncanny X-Men #211 (August 1986), part of the "Mutant Massacre" storyline.

Cybelle is a mutant and a member of the Morlocks who can secrete acid from her skin. Cybelle was killed by Harpoon in her first appearance, but was resurrected long after her death on Krakoa. After Krakoa merged with the White Hot Room, she began an illegal mutant smuggling operation, but was stopped by Wolverine.

=== Cybelle in other media ===
Cybelle makes non-speaking appearances in X-Men: Evolution.

== Doctor Cyclobe ==
Doctor Cyclobe is a character appearing in American comic books published by Marvel Comics. The character primarily appears as an antagonist of Machine Man or in his capacity as the head of Baintronics security. The character, created by Tom DeFalco and Mike Hawthorne, first appears in Machine Man.

== Cyclone ==
Cyclone is the name of several characters appearing in American comic books published by Marvel Comics.

=== André Gerard ===
André Gerard was born in Lyon, France. Formerly an engineer working for NATO, Gerard had a falling out with his former employees, supposedly related to political decisions over implementing his research, based on the development of a weapon that generates high velocity tornado-like winds. Gerard takes his invention and uses it for his own criminal ends as Cyclone. Cyclone is broken out of prison by the Masked Marauder and employed by the Nefaria family as an enforcer. Cyclone is sent to kill Spider-Man and Moon Knight, but was defeated by Moon Knight. Concerned over the murder of several villains by the vigilante Scourge, Cyclone attends a meeting at the Bar with No Name to discuss measures against Scourge. However, Cyclone is shot to death by the Scourge, who is posing as a bartender.

=== Gregory Stevens ===
The second Cyclone, Gregory Stevens, is introduced in Marvel Comics Presents #97 (December 1992). At the Bar with No Name, Cyclone participates in a bar fight initiated by the Impossible Man posing as the Ace of Spades in a poker game. Cyclone assists several agents of Justin Hammer (Afterburner, Beetle, Blacklash, Blizzard, Boomerang, and Spymaster) in attacking Silver Sable and her Wild Pack. Cyclone throws rubble at Silver Sable's group, but retreats when Larry Arnold starts shooting at him. Stevens was reported to have been killed in a skiing accident.

=== Pierre Fresson ===
Pierre Fresson is a member of a European crime family who is given a recreation of the Cyclone suit. Not wishing to serve the European crime family any longer, he stole the suit and fled. Now freelance, he operated as an agent of Justin Hammer, before being recruited into Crimson Cowl's first incarnation of the Masters of Evil. Later, he attempted to steal Justin Hammer's will, before being soundly defeated by the Thunderbolts again. After it was revealed that Hammer had planted time bombs in his former agents, Cyclone was given the option to work with the Thunderbolts to rid themselves of the threat. At first, Fresson attempted to flee, but quickly surrendered and joined the Thunderbolts.

Cyclone battles a group of elite agents of S.H.I.E.L.D. before Hawkeye gives him the option of either remaining a Thunderbolt or being cut loose. Choosing the latter, Cyclone is turned over to S.H.I.E.L.D. as he is no longer a Thunderbolt and therefore a felon. Boomerang and Owl hire Cyclone onto the Sinister Sixteen, assembled to distract the Chameleon's forces while Boomerang steals from him. When the police arrive, Cyclone and most of the Sinister Sixteen surrender.

=== Cyclone in other media ===
A member of the Elementals modeled after Cyclone appears in Spider-Man: Far From Home. Identified as the Air Elemental, it is said to have power over wind and storms. Peter Parker later discovers that the Elementals are holographic illusions employed by Mysterio in a bid to acquire Tony Stark's technology and falsely establish Mysterio as a superhero.
