= Koi Boi =

Marvel Comics character

Publication information
- Publisher: Marvel Comics
- First appearance: April 2015
- First comic appearance: The Unbeatable Squirrel Girl #2
- Created by: Ryan North and Erica Henderson

In-story information
- Alter ego: Ken Shiga
- Species: Human
- Abilities: Enhanced swimming Marine zoopathy Size-shifting; Super-speed

Koi Boi is a fictional superhero who appears in the Marvel Comics, usually as an ally of the Squirrel Girl. He first appeared in the April 2015 edition of the comic series The Unbeatable Squirrel Girl, created by Ryan North and Erica Henderson.

== Publication history ==
Koi Boi appeared first in the second issue of The Unbeatable Squirrel Girl by Marvel Comics in April 2015. The character is created by Ryan North and Erica Henderson.

== Fictional character biography ==
Ken Shiga is the real name of Koi Boi, who is a student at the Empire State University, where he is friends with Squirrel Girl (Doreen Green) and Chipmunk Hunk (Tomas Lara-Perez). Ken balances his everyday life with superhero adventures. Koi Boi and Hunk help Squirrel Girl fight the Hippo, who robs banks to fund his daily food needs. Later, when Ratatoskr, a squirrel, attempts to subdue the humans, they join force again to take on it. Ratatoskr briefly corrupts and takes over the minds of humans to make them part of its army, before the team defeats it. Later, Koi Boi helps Squirrel Girl defeat the super villain Swarm.

== Powers and abilities ==
Koi Boi has the ability to talk to fish, as well as to breathe and move swiftly underwater. He has specialized cells similar to some of the fishes, which give him the ability to manipulate and navigate using the magnetic field of the Earth. He is able to vary his size, and can move at superhuman speeds.

== Gender identity ==
The gender identity of Koi Boi was not revealed in the comics and was first raised by columnist Elle Collins. Collins noted that in the ninth issue of the publication of Unbeatable Squirrel Girl, the character was seen wearing a binder when he transforms from Ken Shiga to his super hero costume, and raised the possibility that the character might be transgender. Comic book writer Magdalene Visaggio raised this publicly, and asked Erica Henderson for confirmation. While Henderson confirmed that the character was trans, she said that there were no plans to bring it out in the publication. Writer Mike McDermott also raised the possibility that the character was LGBTQ based on the spelling of the name "Boi".

== Critical reception ==
Elle Collins wrote a column for the digital media outlet Comics Alliance about the character. Collins praised the characterization of Koi Boi, who was a simple human being rather than an alien or a deity, which are common tropes used represent trans characters in the American comic book industry. While she wishes to see more trans superheroes in the comics, she was disappointed that the revelation of the character as transgender came through social media rather than in the series, hiding the reality of their identity. However, she did not blame Ryan North or Erica Henderson for the invisibility of the character's trans identity, but Marvel Comics' veiled censorship of trans and LGBTQ stories.

== In other media ==
Koi Boi appears as a playable character in Lego Marvel Super Heroes 2.
