= Brain Drain (character) =

- Brain Drain as depicted in The Invaders #2 (October 1975). Art by Frank Robbins.

Publication information
- Publisher: Marvel Comics
- First appearance: The Invaders #2 (October 1975)
- Created by: Roy Thomas; Frank Robbins

In-story information
- Alter ego: Werner Schmidt
- Team affiliations: Omega Flight
- Notable aliases: Brian Drayne
- Abilities: Brilliant scientist Mind control Robot body

Brain Drain (Werner Schmidt) is a character appearing in American comic books published by Marvel Comics. Introduced as a supervillain, he later became an ally of Squirrel Girl.

== Publication history ==
Brain Drain first appeared in The Invaders #2 (Oct. 1975) and was created by writer Roy Thomas and artist Frank Robbins. Initially introduced as an enemy of the Invaders, Brain Drain went on to appear as an antagonist in the series Alpha Flight and a supporting character in the series The Unbeatable Squirrel Girl.

== Fictional character biography ==
Werner Schmidt first appears as Brain Drain in the title Invaders, leading a group of beings claiming to be Teutonic gods against World War II superhero team the Invaders. Brain Drain recounts in flashback his origin to Captain America, explaining how a falling meteorite all but killed him. The "meteorite" was in fact a spaceship, with the four alien inhabitants saving Schmidt's brain and eyes and placing them in a robot body. With his brain waves heightened during the process, Schmidt dubs himself "Brain Drain" and taking mental control of the aliens - which he calls "Star Gods" - renames them after old German gods: Donar, Log, Froh, and Brunnhilde. When Brunnhilde is released, she taunts Brain Drain into committing suicide in a vat of chemicals. The Invaders escape as the aliens destroy themselves and the installation.

The title Alpha Flight reveals that Brain Drain's brain casing was lost in the snow below a mountain for decades, and is rescued after taking mental control of a nearby hiker. The character allies with the Master of the World, a perennial foe of the superhero team Alpha Flight. Joining the Master's team Omega Flight in a new robot body, Brain Drain and other villains battle the heroes on several occasions, before finally being defeated.

Brain Drain returns as an antagonist in The Unbeatable Squirrel Girl, but is quickly defeated due to his outdated technology and design flaws. Upon realizing that Brain Drain did not have a choice about his evil actions due to his programming, Squirrel Girl and her roommate Nancy Whitehead update his technology to modern standards. Upon awakening, he reveals that he intended to reform and was specifically seeking Squirrel Girl's help, after which he decides to audit computer science courses at Empire State University, under the human name Brian Drayne.

== Powers and abilities ==
Werner Schmidt is a brilliant scientist. After his brain was transplanted into a robot body by aliens, Brain Drain gained the power of mind control.

== In other media ==
Brain Drain appears in Marvel’s Squirrel Girl: The Unbeatable Radio Show, voiced by Peter Hermann.
