= Squirrel Girl =

Fictional character appearing in American comic books published by Marvel Comics

- Textless variant cover of Unbeatable Squirrel Girl #6. Art by Kamome Shirahama.

Publication information
- Publisher: Marvel Comics
- First appearance: Marvel Super-Heroes vol. 2 #8 (Winter 1991)
- Created by: Will Murray (writer); Steve Ditko (artist)

In-story information
- Alter ego: Doreen Allene Green
- Species: Human mutate
- Team affiliations: Great Lakes Avengers; Avengers Idea Mechanics; U.S.Avengers; Avengers
- Partnerships: Monkey Joe; Tippy-Toe; Wolverine
- Abilities: Squirrel powers granting: Superhuman agility, senses, and strength; Ability to communicate with squirrels; Regenerative healing factor; Retractable knuckle spikes; Razor-sharp claws; Prehensile tail; Night vision

Squirrel Girl (Doreen Allene Green) is a superheroine appearing in American comic books published by Marvel Comics. Created by writer Will Murray and writer-artist Steve Ditko, the character first appeared in Marvel Super-Heroes vol. 2 #8, a.k.a. Marvel Super-Heroes Winter Special (cover-dated Winter 1991). Murray created the character out of a desire to write lighthearted stories, in contrast to the heavily dramatic tales that were then the norm in mainstream comics.

Although distinct from the mutants of Marvel Comics, Doreen has a genetic anomaly which gives her the ability to communicate with squirrels. She has been a member of both the Avengers and the Great Lakes Avengers, and has been a supporting character in stories featuring Luke Cage and Jessica Jones. Doreen has also appeared in her own solo series, The Unbeatable Squirrel Girl, which has depicted her dividing her time between her superhero adventures and her work as a college student.

== Publication history ==
=== Creation and development ===
Squirrel Girl was created by writer Will Murray and artist Steve Ditko, making her debut in "The Coming of ... Squirrel Girl" in Marvel Super-Heroes vol. 2 #8, a.k.a. Marvel Super-Heroes Winter Special (cover-dated Winter 1991). She ambushes the superhero Iron Man, teams up with him, and, after Iron Man is captured, defeats the villainous Doctor Doom. The story also introduces her squirrel sidekick, Monkey Joe.

Murray has since described the character's genesis:

Actually I created Squirrel Girl in script form without any artist input. Tom Morgan was originally going to draw it, but when he dropped out, I requested Ditko and got him. Ditko did a great job in bringing my baby to life. He invented that knuckle spike. It wasn't in the script. I based Squirrel Girl ironically enough on a long–ago girlfriend who read comics and was into "critters"—wild animals of all types. Coincidentally, she was a big Ditko fan. I think I got the idea because I had a bunch of squirrels running around my roof and sometimes coming in through my open bedroom window and inspiration struck.

Murray attempted to pitch a follow-up story where Squirrel Girl tried to join the Fantastic Four, but it was turned down. Despite Marvel acknowledging the character's "coolness", Murray was told that she did not feel like a Marvel character and that they most likely would not use her again.

=== Later appearances ===
Squirrel Girl next appeared in Marvel Year-In-Review '92, where she made a one-panel appearance in the self-satirizing book's Marvel 2099 section, where "Squirrel Girl: 2099" was listed as one of "the 2099 books we've pretty much ruled out" as actual future titles. Later, she was slated to join the New Warriors, but writer Fabian Nicieza left Marvel before going through with his plan. In 1997, Fleer-Skybox released cards based on Marvel Superheroes, one of which was a more sexualized version of Squirrel Girl.

She did not appear again for nearly a decade. She was mentioned only once in comics during that time: In Deadpool #7, Deadpool's friend/maid/mother-figure/prisoner Blind Al mentions accidentally putting "bleach in with [Deadpool's] Squirrel Girl Underoos".

In 2005, comic writer Dan Slott wrote a four-issue miniseries for the superhero team the Great Lakes Avengers. Created in 1989, this team was made up of enthusiastic heroes with bizarre and nearly useless abilities. They had appeared only a handful of times over their 16-year history, serving as comic relief. As part of the team's series, roster changes were made and the Squirrel Girl character was revived and included on the team. The miniseries satirized comic book deaths, and it was announced that a team member would die in every issue. After Squirrel Girl made a fuss to ensure that Monkey Joe would be an official member of the team, he was killed in the third issue. Slott would also pen further appearances for her and the team in the Christmas-themed GLX-Mas Special and GLI/Deadpool Summer Fun Spectacular one-shots. Slott's stories satirized Squirrel Girl's unlikely victory over Doctor Doom from her debut appearance by depicting her as capable of defeating some of Marvel's other highest-ranking supervillains, including MODOK, the Mandarin, and Thanos, mostly in comedically unexplained, off-panel ways.

During 2006's "Civil War" company-wide story arc, Squirrel Girl and the rest of the team fought Deadpool in Cable & Deadpool #30. In 2007, she and the newly renamed "Great Lakes Initiative" again appeared alongside Deadpool in the Deadpool/GLI Summer Fun Spectacular one-shot.

In September 2010's release of the five-part story line I am an Avenger, Squirrel Girl appears in the first issue in the story "Welcome Home Squirrel Girl". The premise of the story was simply Squirrel Girl coming home to Manhattan.

Squirrel Girl appears as a supporting character sporadically in the 2010–2013 New Avengers series, from issue #7 (February 2011) through its final issue #34 (January 2013). She is not a member of the team, but works as a super-powered nanny for the daughter of Luke Cage and Jessica Jones while attending New York University.

=== The Unbeatable Squirrel Girl ===
On October 6, 2014, Marvel announced that Squirrel Girl would, for the first time, be starring in her own series, The Unbeatable Squirrel Girl, written by Ryan North and drawn by Erica Henderson. The series' first issue was released on January 7, 2015. The series' title alluded to the character's infeasible history of defeating high-level Marvel villains, and its central premise puts a twist on the idea, presenting Squirrel Girl as "unbeatable" because she always pursues non-violent solutions, befriending villains and helping them turn their lives around, rather than actually fighting them.

The Unbeatable Squirrel Girl ran for eight issues before being rebooted in October 2015 as part of the All-New, All-Different Marvel branding with Squirrel Girl being part of New Avengers. The Unbeatable Squirrel Girl continued as monthly publication until November 2019, for a total of 58 issues. Derek Charm took over art duties in May 2018.

Strong trade sales at school book fairs encouraged the team to develop an original graphic novel, The Unbeatable Squirrel Girl Beats Up the Marvel Universe!, released in October 2016. While Henderson told The Hollywood Reporter balancing the graphic novel and monthly series "was almost too much work", North expressed interest in another graphic novel, calling it "a fun challenge".

Starting in 2017, Squirrel Girl appeared in U.S.Avengers, a replacement title for The New Avengers.

Starting in January 2026, The Unbeatable Squirrel Girl received a Webtoon adaptation.

==== Podcast continuation ====
In April 2022, Marvel Entertainment and SiriusXM launched Marvel's Squirrel Girl: The Unbeatable Radio Show which is a six-episode podcast series that acts as a direct continuation of the comic series. It is written by North, directed by Giovanna Sardelli and stars Milana Vayntrub as Squirrel Girl; the series is produced by Radio Point. Additionally, North "wrote an all-new 'Squirrel Girl' vertical comic tie-in" which debuted on Marvel Unlimited.

== Fictional character biography ==
Squirrel Girl in her initial appearance

Doreen Allene Green was born to Dorian and Maureen Green in Canada. When she was 10 years old, Doreen discovered she could communicate with squirrels; she suffered a modification in her genes for unknown reasons that granted her squirrel-like abilities, which manifested predominantly as a prehensile tail. When her parents consulted a doctor, it was determined that Doreen was not a mutant, even though she believed so for a long time. She is first seen as Squirrel Girl ambushing Iron Man in a forest, hoping to impress the veteran hero and become his sidekick. The 14-year-old introduces herself and her pet squirrel Monkey Joe and displays her squirrel-themed abilities. After she rescues Iron Man from Doctor Doom with the help of a horde of squirrels, Iron Man says she is too young to fight crime, but that he will put in a good word for her to the Avengers when she is older.

Years later, having moved to New York City, Doreen joins the Great Lakes Avengers. Squirrel Girl introduces each issue of the team's miniseries, providing an opinion about the contents of the series. Her sidekick Monkey Joe also joins the team and comments upon the series as well. He is later killed by Leather Boy, a rejected GLA member who was disguised as Doctor Doom. Enraged by the death of her friend, Squirrel Girl demonstrates the true extent of her powers when she defeats the villain Maelstrom by overwhelming him with a literal army of squirrels. She finds a new squirrel companion during this battle, the only one of her squirrel army who survived. Doreen names her Tippy-Toe. After receiving a subpoena from the Avengers and discovering that her teammates are all mutants, the team renames themselves the "Great Lakes X-Men", complete with new costumes.

During the GLX-Mas Special, Squirrel Girl and Tippy-Toe single-handedly defeat the supervillains MODOK, Terrax, and Thanos. S.H.I.E.L.D. agent Dum Dum Dugan tries to recruit her, explaining that the organization had been watching her for some time. Doreen declines the offer, saying she is happy with the Great Lakes X-Men.

After helping the Thing defeat Bi-Beast, Squirrel Girl was invited to the annual Superheroes Poker Tournament and brought the team with her. In the end, Flatman won the tournament with a straight flush, beating the Thing's four fours. After being discouraged from using the names X-Men and Defenders by members of those teams present at the tournament, and since Flatman was the champion of the tournament, the team renamed themselves the Great Lakes Champions, despite protests from former Champions of Los Angeles member Hercules.

During the Civil War crossover storyline, Squirrel Girl and the Great Lakes Champions registered under the Superhuman Registration Act, as revealed when Deadpool attempted to apprehend them for violating the Act, only to be defeated and informed that they had already registered. Under the Registration Act, Squirrel Girl remains a member of the again-renamed Great Lakes Initiative.

Squirrel Girl and the GLI, along with Deadpool, are sent to save Dionysus after he fell from Mount Olympus and was captured by A.I.M., who planned to use his powers to cause mental instability in superheroes they consider a threat. After their victory, Squirrel Girl helps Dionysus back to Olympus and to his own bed to sleep it off. It is later revealed that she is a fan of the superhero team the New Warriors, especially Robbie Baldwin, the hero Speedball, on whom she has a crush, and the two eventually share a kiss. Squirrel Girl convinces Doctor Doom to let her use a time machine to prevent Speedball from becoming the guilt-plagued hero Penance. The device instead takes her into the year 2099, where she encounters an alternate, future version of Speedball, whom she unsuccessfully tries to have return with her to her present day. She also encounters a future version of Mister Immortal who convinces her to kick Deadpool out of the team, which she does after returning to her own time.

During the Secret Invasion storyline, the team confronted a Skrull disguised as Grasshopper, with help from Gravity and Catwalk. They later appeared to welcome Gravity as leader of the team, after he was transferred to Wisconsin by Norman Osborn.

After defeating Fin Fang Foom and finding little support from her teammates on the again renamed Great Lakes Avengers, whom she believes have her shoulder most of their work, she exits the group.

When Luke Cage and Jessica Jones seek a nanny for their daughter Danielle Cage, they hire Squirrel Girl. It is also revealed that Doreen had a brief relationship with Wolverine (then a member of the New Avengers), which did not end happily.

Doreen begins her college career at Empire State University, majoring in computer science. Upon arriving, she ends up fighting Kraven the Hunter, who was lashing out at the local squirrels including Tippy-Toe, whom he caught and was about to kill. She stops him by informing him of the existence of sea monsters like Giganto and challenges him to hunt them. Later, she discovers that Galactus is heading to Earth to devour it, and she steals Iron Man's armor and heads to the Moon with Tippy-Toe. On their way, they defeat Whiplash, who had attacked Squirrel Girl, mistaking her for Iron Man. She and Tippy-Toe surprisingly befriend Galactus instead of fighting him, and afterwards tell him of a planet that could sustain him even better than the Earth. This planet is devoid of intelligent life but rich in nuts, which Galactus has developed a new liking for. He then sends the two back home, and he leaves the Earth to live another day.

When she arrives back home, her roommate Nancy Whitehead tells her that she has figured out she is a superhero, but promises not to tell anyone, the two becoming good friends. Later, Squirrel Girl and other superheroes defeat Mysterion, who was attacking Liberty Island with an army of robot dinosaurs. Shortly thereafter, while attempting to stop Hippo from robbing a bank, she meets Chipmunk Hunk and Koi Boi, both of whom have the ability to speak to different animals. Nancy reveals their secret identities (Tomas Lara-Perez and Ken Shiga, respectively) to her, since she easily recognized them under their masks. They later encounter a monstrous Asgardian squirrel god, Ratatoskr, who had been causing mayhem on the city by trash-talking its citizens during their sleep, but is defeated with help from Loki and the current and former Thor.

During their second college year, Doreen and Nancy encounter Brain Drain and quickly defeat him due to his outdated technology and crucial design flaws. Upon realizing that he did not have a choice about his evil actions due to his programming, Doreen and Nancy update his technology to modern standards. When he awakens, Brain Drain reveals that he intended to reform and ends up enrolling at ESU to take computer science courses. Later, she and her classmates get sent back in time to the 1960s by fellow student Cody, who sent them away from the present time to curve his grade. Nancy, the only person who remembers Doreen's existence, goes back to rescue her along with a past version of Doctor Doom, who then learns that he will successfully take over the world thanks to a copy of Wikipedia on Nancy's phone. In the present day, Cody wakes up to a Doctor Doom dystopia and takes himself back to the 1960s with an older, future Doreen to help fight Doom. Doreen defeats Doom by repeatedly using Cody's time machine to send herself a day before the fight, creating a small army of Squirrel Girls that swarm Doom and force him to give up. Doreen and the students are sent back to the present, while future Doreen stays behind and continues to foil Doom's schemes.

Later, she gets jealous when her crush Chipmunk Hunk, starts dating a classmate named Mary. Nancy, Tippy-Toe, and Koi Boi help set her up an online dating profile, which leads to many unsuccessful dates, one of which ends with an encounter with the Mole Man, who is angered by how Doreen's earlier suggestions to Kraven has affected his home. Doreen apologizes to him and the two have a conversation about his situation, leading the Mole Man to proposing to Doreen on the spot and several subsequent schemes to get Doreen to go on a date with him. He threatens to bury a number of worldwide landmarks if she does not date him, and after Nancy is nearly kidnapped by him and being swarmed by the media, she goes to confront Mole Man only to find that Tricephalous is in love with him. Doreen lets the beast defeat her to woo Mole Man and get him off her back for good, and decides that dating is not right for her at the moment after seeing that Mary is a nice fit for Chipmunk Hunk.

Squirrel Girl also had an alternate version of herself due to time travel running around for decades interfering with Doctor Doom's plans. As a result, she released an A.I. Doombot that eventually becomes Gwenpool's nemesis, Vincent Doonan. They later reconcile and at Gwen's insistence he even lets Squirrel Girl examine him for her computer class. She then follows Gwenpool to Hell to rescue her brother Teddy Poole and they defeat Mephisto. While there though Gwen points out that in the Marvel universe the devil is very real and punchable, suggesting that heroes should do so all the time confusing Squirrel Girl. Running out of pages, Gwen then leaves, getting Teddy back to Earth to her and runs off to do other things before her comic comes to an end.

Another alternate version of Squirrel Girl is created when Doreen falls into a piece of technology which Tony Stark had obtained from the High Evolutionary; the clone is nicknamed Allene and is like Doreen in most every way except she is lacking in the restraint and empathy which largely defines Doreen's career as a superhero. Allene strives to create a world where squirrels are the dominant species, sending an army of squirrels into the cloning device to rid them of their restraint and imprisoning every superhero who stands in her way in the Negative Zone. When Doreen gives her last effort to appeal to Allene's humanity, Allene instead banishes Doreen to the moon, where a dying Doreen summons Thor's hammer Mjolnir, becoming Squirrel Thor. After freeing all the heroes from the Negative Zone, Doreen relinquishes Mjolnir and Allene willingly banishes herself and her squirrel army into the Negative Zone, where they shape it into the squirrel-centric utopia she had strived to create in the first place called "Squirreltopia 5000". Doreen and her friends would go on to visit Allene in the Negative Zone on later occasions.

Squirrel Girl later becomes a member of the U.S.Avengers. She later receives a wealthy benefactor in Melissa Morbeck, a woman who can talk to animals who gives Doreen a new "flying squirrel" suit. Morbeck is quickly revealed to be a supervillain, however, who uses technology to exert sadistic control over animals and unleashes an army of insects and wild animals on the city, disguising one of her animal minions as Doctor Doom. While Squirrel Girl, Chipmunk Hunk, and Koi Boi subdue the animal army, Nancy and Mary set off an electromagnetic pulse to disable Morbeck's control over the animals, leading to her arrest. Later stories see Squirrel Girl traveling to the Savage Land and outer space, where she clashes with Loki, Drax the Destroyer, and the Silver Surfer. After she returns home, a clash with a small-time livestreaming criminal inadvertently sends Doreen and Nancy into hypertime; the two girls quickly age into elderly women and become close as they find common interests. They eventually devise a means of reversing time, so they revert to teenagers and forget their lives together, but Doreen finds a note written by her future self to preserve the memory of the happiness they shared.

While visiting Allene in the Negative Zone, Squirrel Girl is summoned by Loki to help fight the Frost Giants in the War of the Realms. There she once again encounters Ratatoskr, with whom she clashes yet eventually forms an unlikely, if uneasy, alliance. Afterwards, Melissa Morbeck returns with an alliance of supervillains (including Doctor Doom, MODOK Superior, Leader, and Whiplash) to enact revenge on Squirrel Girl – kidnapping Brain Drain, stealing Iron Man's armor, attacking Doreen's apartment, and finally publicly leaking her secret identity. Several heroes and villains from across the Marvel universe come to Squirrel Girl's aid, including Kraven the Hunter, Ratatoskr, Rhino, Mole Man, Tony Stark, and eventually Galactus, who uses the Power Cosmic to teleport away Morbeck and her allies and return Stark his armor. Afterwards, Stark publicly broadcasts a video which celebrates Squirrel Girl's various achievements.

In the aftermath of the attack on her apartment and her leaked secret identity, Squirrel Girl briefly retires from active heroism and instead starts hosting an AM broadcast call-in show called "The Unbeatable Squirrel Girl Radio Show", where she answers questions regarding what it's like to be a superhero. She's joined by her friends Tippy-Toe, Nancy Whitehead, Koi Boi, Chipmunk Hunk, and Brain Drain.

When Toy Soldier arrives at the Jarvis Lounge asking Edwin Jarvis if he can join the Avengers, Squirrel Girl vouches for him. After Spider-Man receives a distress letter from Christina Xu with the location of Stillwell Farms, Squirrel Girl is among the superheroes who set out to rescue Spider-Boy and Christina. She partakes in the fight against Madame Monstrosity.

== Powers and abilities ==
During Squirrel Girl's first encounter with Iron Man, she provided a detailed demonstration of her powers and abilities: a furry, prehensile tail roughly 3–4 feet long, sizable buck teeth strong enough to chew through wood, and superhuman strength and agility that allows her to easily jump between trees. Her fingers have sharp claws that assist her with climbing, and she possesses retractable "knuckle spikes" roughly 2–3 inches long on each hand. Most importantly, she can communicate with and understand squirrels, but does not communicate with squirrels telepathically. Squirrels have also been depicted as understanding her when she speaks in English.

Later appearances have revealed additional abilities possessed by Squirrel Girl including heightened reflexes (which she dubs her "squirrelgility") and vision (her eyes have been seen to glow red in low-light situations) and she has also at times displayed an enhanced sense of smell. Squirrel Girl has also revealed that her lips taste like hazelnuts, though this attribute has since been retconned by Unbeatable Squirrel Girl writer Ryan North. She is also a superb hand-to-hand combatant capable of taking down Wolverine in a one-to-one no-claws fight.

Another ability showcased in The Unbeatable Squirrel Girl is Doreen's enhanced jaw strength. Due to her proportional squirrel abilities, she can bite with one million and eighty-five thousand pounds of pressure. This gives her the ability to bite through solid steel.

=== Equipment ===
Squirrel Girl carries a utility belt consisting of multiple pouches that contain nuts to give as snacks to her squirrel friends. These are known humorously as her "nut sacks". It was originally unknown whether the black markings around her eyes are the result of her mutation, or cosmetically applied to enhance her squirrel-themed appearance (though they did not appear to smear when she's crying). In The New Avengers Annual #1, she is shown in casual clothes lacking these markings.

Squirrel Girl is also shown carrying a full set of "Iron Man Vs. Series battle cards", which she uses to show Dum Dum Dugan how she knows him (she mentions Dugan has a "defense stat of 8"; her own is 6, although the rating system is left unclear). After MODOK is pointed out to her, she consults the supervillain's own card to confirm his abilities. The printing on the two cards shown (Dugan's and MODOK's) is actually gibberish. In her solo series The Unbeatable Squirrel Girl, she has a set of "Deadpool's guide to Super Villains" cards to help her identify villains and their possible weaknesses. The writing on these are legible, and tend to contain both valuable information as well as comedic jokes about her opponents. She only owns the super villain set, though some antiheroes such as Ant-Man still have cards in her collection.

In the GLX-Mas Special, she is shown flying a small gyrocopter called a "Squirrel-A-Gig" and mentions it was a gift from GLA teammate Big Bertha. This reappears in Deadpool/GLI Summer Fun Spectacular, used as a way of infiltrating Doctor Doom's castle. The first version was a standard gyrocopter, while it is later shown as a more stylized superhero helicopter (including squirrel-styled bodywork). Squirrel Girl is shown as being able to fly the craft expertly, including through the anti-aircraft defenses surrounding Castle Doom, crediting this to her "squirrelgility".

In The Unbeatable Squirrel Girl, she also temporarily obtains a set of armor based on pieces of Iron Man's modular armor that reshapes to fit her, including her tail. The same series also retcons her status as a mutant, noting that her powers are the result of an unspecified "something" relating to her RNA or DNA, and that she is "medically and legally distinct from being a mutant."

In the graphic novel The Unbeatable Squirrel Girl Beats Up the Marvel Universe, she is shown as being worthy of wielding Mjolnir, becoming Squirrel Thor when she does so.

== Known squirrels ==
Squirrel Girl is always accompanied by one or more squirrels. Two of these, Monkey Joe and later his successor Tippy-Toe, have been her constant companion. At her insistence, they have each been accepted as a full member of the Great Lakes Avengers.

In addition to Monkey Joe and Tippy-Toe, Squirrel Girl named several other squirrels in Great Lakes Avengers #4. Slippy Pete, Mr. Freckle, and Nutso are presumed dead after being sucked into the singularity created by Maelstrom.

== Other related characters ==
Prior to her first solo run, Squirrel Girl's supporting cast was mainly limited to her pet squirrels, while she herself would usually act as a supporting character to other heroes, most notably Iron Man, Danielle Cage, Spider-Man, and, of course, the Great Lakes Avengers. Since then, her personal life has been delved into with her racking up quite an impressive cast.

=== Supporting cast ===
- Dorian "Dor" Green: Doreen's father.
- Maureen Green: Doreen's mother.
- Nancy Whitehead: Doreen's college roommate and close confidante who occasionally aids her in battling supervillains. She has a habit of deducing people's identities easily.
- Tomas Lara-Perez / Chipmunk Hunk: A young man who developed chipmunk related powers and embraced his alter ego following an encounter with Doreen. Despite Doreen having a crush on him, he starts dating Mary Mahajan.
- Ken Shiga / Koi Boi: A fellow crime fighter with aquatic abilities and Tomas' partner. He is a trans man.
- Mary Mahajan: An engineering student and Squirrel Girl supporter who is dating Tomas.
- Werner Schmidt / Brain Drain: A former villain with outdated technology who is upgraded by Doreen and Nancy and decides to turn his life around for the better.
- G'illian Blax'zthor / Gillian Blythe: A Skrull girl who came to earth to get away from her war mongering kind.

=== Enemies ===
- Melissa Morbeck: A philanthropist who secretly wants to rule the world via control of animals. She essentially becomes Squirrel Girl's arch-nemesis and at one point steals one of Iron Man's suits, taking the name Iron Ring.
- Ratatoskr: The Asgardian creature of the same name who broke free from her job to cause havoc.
- Shannon Sugarbaker: A rich entitled cosplay fan girl who hunts anthropomorphic animals.
- Kraven the Hunter: Usually an enemy of Spider-Man, this famed hunter has crossed paths with Squirrel Girl numerous times; occasionally the two team up.
- Allene Green / Squirrel Girl: One of many numerous clones of Squirrel Girl created by High Evolutionary that Doreen initially befriended. She turns her back on humanity and attempts to make squirrels the dominant species.
- MODOK: A frequent enemy to many heroes in the Marvel Universe. Doreen faced him on occasion.
- EpicCrimez: A social media influencer who commits typical crimes.
- Ms. Quizzler: A one-off villain who is obsessed with riddles. She was ultimately coaxed out of villainy by Doreen.
- Doctor Doom: The arch-enemy of the Fantastic Four. He became an enemy of Doreen, following his humiliating defeat at her hands.

== Squirrel Girl's victories ==
Following her defeat of Doctor Doom, an ongoing joke depicts Squirrel Girl repeatedly attaining victory over various villains, some of whom are far more powerful than her. Typically, these victories occur off-panel, though some, like her battles with Deadpool, MODOK, and Wolverine are shown. Her victories often result from her opponent's overconfidence, weakness from an earlier fight, or creative use of her powers. For example, her defeat of Bi-Beast: while visiting squirrel friends in Central Park, Squirrel Girl came across the Thing fighting Bi-Beast. She told the squirrels to retrieve the smelliest garbage they could find and place it around the combatants, resulting in everyone having to hold their noses. Bi-Beast had two heads, and two noses, and had to use both hands to hold his noses, leaving himself defenseless, allowing the Thing to knock him out.

Squirrel Girl's defeat of Thanos is an ambiguous one. Uatu the Watcher was present at the battle and claimed Squirrel Girl defeated the genuine Thanos and not a clone or copy. However, the same writer responsible for that story would soon after write another tale in which Thanos claimed to have perfected a means of creating clones of himself that could fool even "the most cosmic of beings". Adding to the ambiguity is the fact that the reveal comes from the mind of a clone whose memory had been altered.

Squirrel Girl has also saved the world from Galactus, but she does not technically defeat him (though she tries to harm him when they first meet). Instead, she befriends Galactus and offers him an alternate means of sustaining his hunger; this act of kindness so moves Galactus that he later intervenes to save Squirrel Girl's life with his powers.

== Reception ==
=== Critical response ===
John Kelly of The Washington Post called Squirrel Girl the "latest hit comics character", writing, "Right now, the hottest superhero in the Marvel Comics universe is not male, does not wear a cape and was not bitten by a radioactive spider. The hottest Marvel superhero has a tail, an overbite and wears acorn earrings. She is called the Unbeatable Squirrel Girl." B. Alan Orange of MovieWeb asserted, "The character was actually created during a time when most comic tales were turning dark and tragic. She was an attempt to lighten the mood of that era. And recently, she has had a reemergence as one of the more popular characters." Dany Roth of Looper described Squirrel Girl as a "fan-favorite character", asserting, "Doreen Allene Green, aka Squirrel Girl, is one of the most beloved Marvel Comics characters that isn't presently in the Marvel Cinematic Universe." Rob Leane of Empire stated, "Big things come in small packages, with Squirrel Girl being a prime example. A younger hero who always exceeds the grown-ups' expectations? Surely this would be a big hit with children, and potentially their parents too – though remember kids, don't feed the grey ones."

Aubrey Sitterson of UGO Networks included Squirrel Girl in their "Women We're Ashamed to Be Attracted To" list, while Matt Patches included her in their "The D-List: Superheroes We Love, That Still Kind of Suck" list. Stacie Rook of Screen Rant included Squirrel Girl in their "10 Female Marvel Heroes That Should Come To The MCU" list. Chris McMullen of Space.com ranked Squirrel Girl 2nd in their "5 Marvel Characters Who Deserve Their Own Show" list. Chase Magnett of ComicBook.com ranked Squirrel Girl 6th in their "10 Greatest Steve Ditko Characters" list, writing, "Squirrel Girl has only recently hit her stride at Marvel Comics, becoming one of the most popular characters among young audiences. However, everything that is great about Squirrel Girl was present to some degree from the very start", while Cameron Bonomolo ranked her 10th in their "Steve Ditko's 10 Best Marvel Co-Creations" list.

Deirdre Kaye of Scary Mommy ranked Squirrel Girl 6th in their "Looking For A Role Model? These 195+ Marvel Female Characters Are Truly Heroic" list, writing, "Squirrel Girl may not be as widely known or wildly popular as Black Widow or Storm, but she's still earned her spot in this list of best Marvel female characters. One cool thing about Squirrel Girl is that she looks pretty average. She's the Hermione of the superhero world: shrugged off at first but probably a lot smarter and stronger than most of her cohorts. Yes, she has squirrel teeth and an actual tail. But, she still kicks butt and that's made her pretty popular with Marvel fans." Gavia Baker-Whitelaw of The Daily Dot ranked Squirrel Girl 13th in their "Top 33 Female Superheroes Of All Time" list, saying, "Squirrel Girl is officially the most powerful character in the Marvel universe. She's also unofficially one of the most fun superheroes", while describing her as a "cult favorite among Marvel fans".

Writer Brian Michael Bendis mentioned the popularity that Squirrel Girl has among writers as a factor in the unanimous decision to use her in the role of the nanny in "New Avengers". After announcing the character at the 2010 Comic-con panel, Bendis described the audience's reaction: "[it] was so loud, the applause went on for so long ... the place went nuts for a while." He described the applause as comparable to that received by Stan Lee when he entered the room. Co-creator Will Murray expressed interest in returning to the character: "I've been thinking of pitching Marvel a Squirrel Girl project. She's defeated most of the major Marvel super villains. It's time she met her match in The Ultimate Pistachio." Marvel's previous editor-in-chief Joe Quesada joked, "I've always wanted to do a Squirrel Girl miniseries or a Squirrel Girl event – 'Squirrel Girl Destroys Your Nuts!' ... I haven't been able to sell it yet, but I keep on trying."

== Other versions ==
=== Avengers vs. X-Men ===
Squirrel Girl makes an appearance in a bonus story of Avengers vs. X-Men: Versus #6. Here she is depicted competing against Pixie in a game resembling HeroClix where the toys are based on various superheroes. Thing walks in, stopping the game to reveal that the figurines actually belong to the Puppet Master and are made out of his mind-controlling clay. The next day, Squirrel Girl and Pixie read in the Daily Bugle that the clash between the Avengers and X-Men has occurred and have been mirroring the results from their game, implying that they were the cause of the feud.

=== Infinity Warps ===
Luneen Lafagreen / Moon Squirrel, a fusion of Squirrel Girl and Moon Girl created by the Infinity Gems, appears in Infinity Wars.

=== Marvel Universe vs. The Avengers ===
Squirrel Girl and Jessica Jones are killed by Luke Cage after he succumbs to the Survivor 118, a virus that causes those infected by it to become feral to the point of engaging in cannibalism.

=== Marvel Zombies ===
Several versions of Squirrel Girl appear in the different Marvel Zombies specials:

- A zombified Squirrel Girl along with her 'Squirrel-A-Gig' appear in Marvel Zombies: Evil Evolution.
- A zombie Squirrel Girl appears in the Marvel Zombies: Halloween special, where she – and other zombified superheroes – are hunting Kitty Pryde's son Peter until they are both saved by Mephisto.

=== Ultimate Universe ===
An alternate universe version of Squirrel Girl appears in The Ultimates. She was among the prisoners of H.A.N.D. until Wasp frees her.

== In other media ==
=== Television ===
Squirrel Girl as she appears in Fantastic Four: World's Greatest Heroes.

- Squirrel Girl makes a cameo appearance in the Fantastic Four: World's Greatest Heroes episode "The Cure", voiced by Rebecca Shoichet. She auditions to replace Ben Grimm on the Fantastic Four, only to be immediately rejected.
- Squirrel Girl appears in Ultimate Spider-Man, voiced by Misty Lee. This version is a member of the New Warriors and a student at the S.H.I.E.L.D. Academy.
- Squirrel Girl was meant to appear in New Warriors, portrayed by Milana Vayntrub, before the series was cancelled during production.
- Squirrel Girl appears in the Marvel Rising franchise, voiced by Milana Vayntrub. This version is the best friend of Ms. Marvel and a founding member of the Secret Warriors. She first appears in the film Marvel Rising: Secret Warriors and returns in a series of sequel shorts.
- Squirrel Girl appears in Spidey and His Amazing Friends, voiced by Emma Berman.

=== Video games ===
- Squirrel Girl appears in Pinball FX 2 via the Marvel's Women of Power DLC, voiced by Eden Riegel.
- Squirrel Girl appears as a playable character in Marvel Super Hero Squad Online, voiced by Tara Strong.
- Squirrel Girl appears as a playable character in Marvel Super Hero Squad: Comic Combat, voiced by Eden Riegel.
- Squirrel Girl appears as an unlockable character in Marvel: Avengers Alliance.
- Squirrel Girl appears as a playable character in Marvel Heroes, voiced again by Tara Strong.
- Squirrel Girl appears in Marvel Puzzle Quest.
- Squirrel Girl appears as a playable character in Lego Marvel Super Heroes, voiced again by Tara Strong.
- Squirrel Girl appears as a playable character in Lego Marvel Super Heroes 2, voiced by Caitlin Thorburn.
- Squirrel Girl appears as a playable character in Lego Marvel's Avengers, voiced again by Misty Lee.
- Squirrel Girl appears as a playable character in Marvel Contest of Champions.
- Squirrel Girl appears as a playable character in Marvel Future Fight.
- Squirrel Girl appears as a playable character in Marvel Strike Force.
- Squirrel Girl appears in Marvel Avengers Academy.
- Squirrel Girl appears in Marvel Snap.
- Squirrel Girl appears as a playable character in Marvel Rivals, voiced again by Milana Vayntrub.
- Squirrel Girl appears in Marvel Tokon: Fighting Souls, voiced by Sabrina Fest.

=== Miscellaneous ===
- Doreen Green makes a cameo appearance in Web Slingers: A Spider-Man Adventure as a rookie engineer of the Worldwide Engineering Brigade (WEB) program.
- Squirrel Girl appears in the young adult novel The Unbeatable Squirrel Girl: Squirrel Meets World, by Shannon & Dean Hale.
- Squirrel Girl appears in the young adult novel The Unbeatable Squirrel Girl: 2 Fuzzy, 2 Furious.
- Squirrel Girl appears in Squirrel Girl Goes to College: A Squirrel Girl Play, portrayed by Alyssa Buckner.
- Squirrel Girl appears in Marvel TL;DR, voiced by Kimlinh Tran.
- The Unbeatable Squirrel Girl appeared in Magic: The Gathering as a green legendary creature in the Marvel Super Heroes collaboration, featured as both a regular and borderless card.

=== Merchandise ===
The Marvel Rising incarnation of Squirrel Girl received a Target-exclusive doll as part of the franchise's tie-in toyline.

== Collected editions ==
=== Trade paperback ===
Title	Material Collected	Date Published	ISBN
The Unbeatable Squirrel Girl & The Great Lakes Avengers	G.L.A. #1–4, GLX-Mas Special, Thing (2006) #8, Cable & Deadpool #30, Deadpool/GLI Summer Fun Spectacular; material from Marvel Super-Heroes (1990) #8, I Heart Marvel: Masked Intentions, Age of Heroes #3, I am An Avenger #1	July 20, 2016	978-1302900663
Volume one
Squirrel Girl, vol. 1: Squirrel Power	The Unbeatable Squirrel Girl vol. 1 #1–4, plus material from Marvel Super-Heroes (1990) #8	February 19, 2020	978-0785197027
Squirrel Girl, vol. 2: Squirrel You Know It's True	The Unbeatable Squirrel Girl vol. 1 #5–8, plus material from GLX-Mas Special (2006) #1, The Thing (2006) #8, and Age of Heroes (2010) #3	November 25, 2015	978-0785197034
Volume two
Squirrel Girl, vol. 3: Squirrel, You Really Got Me Now	The Unbeatable Squirrel Girl vol. 2 #1–6, and Howard the Duck (2016) #6	May 25, 2016	978-0785196266
Squirrel Girl, vol. 4: I Kissed a Squirrel and I Liked It	The Unbeatable Squirrel Girl vol. 2 #7–11	November 23, 2016	978-0785196273
Squirrel Girl, vol. 5: Like I'm the Only Squirrel in the World	The Unbeatable Squirrel Girl vol. 2 #12–16	March 22, 2017	978-1302903282
Squirrel Girl, vol. 6: Who Run the World? Squirrels!	The Unbeatable Squirrel Girl vol. 2 #17–21	September 27, 2017	978-1302906641
Squirrel Girl, vol. 7: I've Been Waiting for a Squirrel Like You	The Unbeatable Squirrel Girl vol. 2 #22–26	February 28, 2018	978-1302906658
Squirrel Girl, vol. 8: My Best Friend's Squirrel	The Unbeatable Squirrel Girl vol. 2 #27–31, plus material from Not Brand Echh #14	June 20, 2018	978-1302910761
Squirrel Girl, vol. 9: Squirrels Fall Like Dominos	The Unbeatable Squirrel Girl vol. 2 #32–36	November 14, 2018	978-1302910778
Squirrel Girl, vol. 10: Life is Too Short, Squirrel	The Unbeatable Squirrel Girl vol. 2 #37–41	March 6, 2019	978-1302914479
Squirrel Girl, vol. 11: Call your Squirrelfriend	The Unbeatable Squirrel Girl vol. 2 #42–46	September 11, 2019	978-1302914486
Squirrel Girl, vol. 12: To All the Squirrels I've Loved Before	The Unbeatable Squirrel Girl vol. 2 #47–50	February 26, 2020	978-1302917241

Graphic Novel Trade Paperback

Title	Material Collected	Date Published	ISBN
Squirrel Girl: Powers of a Squirrel	The Unbeatable Squirrel Girl vol. 1 #1–8	December 18, 2019	978-1302921163
Squirrel Girl: Big Squirrels Don't Cry	The Unbeatable Squirrel Girl vol. 2 #1–11, Howard the Duck vol. 5 #6	April 15, 2020	978-1302921163
Squirrel Girl: Squirrels Just Want to Have Fun	The Unbeatable Squirrel Girl vol. 2 #12–22	September 7, 2021	978-1302929909

=== Hardcover ===
Title	Material Collected	Date Published	ISBN
Volume one
The Unbeatable Squirrel Girl, vol. 1	The Unbeatable Squirrel Girl vol. 1 #1–8, plus Marvel Super-Heroes #8, GLX-Mas Special, Thing #8, & Age of Heroes #3	November 2, 2016	978-1302902247
Volume two
The Unbeatable Squirrel Girl, vol. 2	The Unbeatable Squirrel Girl vol. 2 #1–11, Howard the Duck vol. 5 #6	May 3, 2017	978-1302903732
The Unbeatable Squirrel Girl, vol. 3	The Unbeatable Squirrel Girl vol. 2 #12–21	March 7, 2018	978-1302908447
The Unbeatable Squirrel Girl, vol. 4	The Unbeatable Squirrel Girl vol. 2 #22–31, material from A Year of Marvels: The Unbeatable and Not Brand Echh #14	January 23, 2019	978-1302915445
Omnibus
The Unbeatable Squirrel Girl Omnibus	The Unbeatable Squirrel Girl vol. 1 #1–8, The Unbeatable Squirrel Girl vol. 2 #1–50, The Unbeatable Squirrel Girl Beats Up the Marvel Universe, Howard the Duck #6, and material from A Year of Marvels: Unbeatable and Not Brand Echh #14	February 8, 2023	Erica Henderson Cover 978-1302950613, Arthur Adams DM Cover 978-1302950606

=== Original Graphic Novel ===
Title	Date Published	ISBN
The Unbeatable Squirrel Girl Beats Up the Marvel Universe	October 5, 2016	978-1302903039
