= The Unbeatable Squirrel Girl =

American comic book series

Publication information
- Publisher: Marvel Comics
- Schedule: Monthly
- Format: Ongoing series
- Genre: Superhero
- Publication date: Vol. 1: January–August 2015; Vol. 2: October 2015–November 2019
- No. of issues: Vol. 1: 8 Vol. 2: 50

Creative team
- Created by: Ryan North; Erica Henderson
- Written by: Ryan North
- Artist(s): Erica Henderson; Derek Charm
- Colorist: Rico Renzi

The Unbeatable Squirrel Girl is an American comic book series published by Marvel Comics featuring Squirrel Girl. The solo series debuted in January 2015 and ran for 8 issues, and was relaunched in October 2015 as part of Marvel's All-New, All-Different Marvel branding and was published through to November 2019 with 50 issues, for a total of 58. Both series were written by Ryan North. Art was by Erica Henderson from the start of the publication until issue #31, with Derek Charm taking over as artist for subsequent issues. Critics praised its comedy as well as the empowering portrayal of its heroine.

Milana Vayntrub was cast as a version of Squirrel Girl based on her The Unbeatable Squirrel Girl depiction in the live-action unaired Marvel Cinematic Universe (MCU) pilot New Warriors, before vocally reprising the role in the Marvel Rising media franchise (2018–2019) and the video game Marvel Rivals (2024). A podcast sequel to the comic book series, Marvel's Squirrel Girl: The Unbeatable Radio Show, launched in April 2022. It is written by North and stars Vayntrub.

== Publication history ==
Marvel registered a trademark for Squirrel Girl in July 2014, leading to speculation that the character would appear in a future film or television series, such as Agents of S.H.I.E.L.D. or Jessica Jones. In October, Entertainment Weekly revealed that Squirrel Girl would star in a solo series by writer Ryan North and artist Erica Henderson. Entertainment Weekly called it a "quietly bold move for Marvel", publishing "a female-centric comic that's intended to appeal equally to canon-heads and newcomers".

Starting in May 2015, the Secret Wars crossover storyline affected a number of Marvel comics and characters. Marvel announced in June 2015 that, after Secret Wars was complete, they would reboot their entire line as part of an All-New, All-Different Marvel rebranding. Though The Unbeatable Squirrel Girl was not part of the Secret Wars storyline, the series was set to be rebooted with Squirrel Girl joining an Avengers team. Marvel later named this team Avengers Idea Mechanics.

In April 2022, Marvel Entertainment and SiriusXM launched Marvel's Squirrel Girl: The Unbeatable Radio Show which is a six-episode podcast series that acts as a direct continuation of the comic series. It is written by North, directed by Giovanna Sardelli and stars Milana Vayntrub as Squirrel Girl; the series is produced by Radio Point. Additionally, North "wrote an all-new 'Squirrel Girl' vertical comic tie-in" which debuted on Marvel Unlimited.

In January 2026, The Unbeatable Squirrel Girl received a Webtoon adaptation.

== Plot ==
=== Volume 1 ===
Doreen Green, known as Squirrel Girl, is a human superhero with the proportional strength and speed of a squirrel, as well as the ability to speak with squirrels, like her sidekick, Tippy-Toe. While originally introduced as a mutant, she was later retconned to be "medically and legally distinct from being a mutant." She can also command an army of squirrels, which she typically uses to overwhelm her foes. As The Unbeatable Squirrel Girl begins, Squirrel Girl has left her home in the Avengers Mansion to major in computer science at Empire State University. While moving into her dormitory, she fights the villain Kraven the Hunter and convinces him to go after more dangerous prey. Later issues had Squirrel Girl facing Whiplash and Galactus. A romantic interest named Tomas is introduced, who later turns out to also be a hero named "Chipmunk Hunk" and also has animal-based powers. During a battle with Ratatoskr, Squirrel Girl teams up with Thor (Jane Foster), Odinson and Loki to defeat the Asgardian demon.

=== Volume 2 ===
Doreen and her dorm-mate Nancy move off campus into an apartment. During a lunch with her mom, Brain Drain attacks them, but it turns out there was a malfunction that they were able to fix and make him kind. They then dress him in human clothes and enroll him in Computer Science classes to allow him to upgrade his old WWII tech. The next morning Doreen is teleported into the 1960s. Nobody remembers Doreen except for Nancy. She finds a secret message from the past, so Nancy begins exploring ways to go into the past. She then meets Doctor Doom (from 1991 who was just defeated by Squirrel Girl and Iron Man in Marvel Super-Heroes Winter Special). Nancy tricks Doom to travel into the past and rescue Squirrel Girl. In the past, Doreen found several other ECU students also stuck in the past and creates a support group. Doom and Nancy meet them, but then Doom reveals he plans on killing Squirrel Girl and all the other super heroes before they gain any of their powers. Using her iPhone which still shows information from the future, Nancy verifies that Doom controls the future. The students track down Doom to Central Park and then teleports before them another student, Cory, and an elderly Doreen Green. It turns out Cory received a teleportation device from a crazy aunt, and since his Computer Science classes graded on a curve he teleported all the smarter students into the past. Nancy then adjusts the teleporter to go back randomly over the last several weeks and teleports Doreen multiple times, creating a Time Loop with dozens of Squirrel Girls, that all overwhelm Doctor Doom, not unlike his initial encounter Marvel Super-Heroes Winter Special, but with dozens of Squirrel Girls instead of Squirrels. Doom surrenders and returns all the Squirrel Girls to the correct time lines, except for the elderly Squirrel Girl, who becomes Cody's crazy aunt.

The next day Doreen notices somebody trying to catnap Nancy's cat, Mew. It was actually Howard the Duck investigating a missing cat case. Kraven then appears and abducts Howard. Doreen follows him to a billionaire madwoman named Shannon Sugarbaker, who is obsessed with cosplay. She has abducted human-like creatures, like Beast, Rocket Raccoon, the missing cat built into a cyborg, and a Squirrel that was fused with Wolverine's DNA and adamantium claws and was going to release them in a high stakes hunt. Kraven and Doreen join them, but Sharon has a superpowered Cosplay outfit with Angel's wings, Iron Man's repulsors, Hulk fists, and Thor's hammer. Doreen and Howard sneak back into the mansion and Howard finds his own superpowered costume and rescues the other abductees. Howard is glad that he closed his case and Kraven learns humility after being hunted for the first time. He vows to only hunt hunters in the future.

== Reception ==
Issue #1 was published on January 7, 2015, to positive reviews. The Unbeatable Squirrel Girl was praised for its comedy, and the character of Squirrel Girl was seen as empowering for being likable, smart, and having an average appearance unlike that of typical superheroes. The Guardian in particular applauded the cartoon-like artwork by Erica Henderson as unique in Marvel's publications. IGN regarded the series as "one of the best new debuts of recent memory". Reviews of issue #2 were positive, with PopMatters calling it a "breath of fresh air: funny, charming, quirky, strong, brave, unbeatable". Comic Book Resources write that issue #1 of the reboot was "silly as ever" and "consistently fun". Entertainment Weekly has said that Squirrel Girl will soon be "defending Earth from threats most cosmic". The series was nominated for an Eisner Award in both 2016 and 2017, winning in 2017 as the "Best Publication for Teens".

== Collected editions ==
=== Comic books ===
The series has been collected into trade paperbacks:

Title	Material collected	Publication date	ISBN
The Unbeatable Squirrel Girl Vol. 1: Squirrel Power	The Unbeatable Squirrel Girl (vol. 1) #1–5, Marvel Super-Heroes #8	1 September 2015	9780785197027
The Unbeatable Squirrel Girl Vol. 2: Squirrel You Know It's True	The Unbeatable Squirrel Girl (vol. 1) #6–8 and material from GLX-Mas Special #1, The Thing (vol. 2) #8, Age of Heroes #3	8 December 2015	9781302483012
The Unbeatable Squirrel Girl Vol. 3: Squirrel, You Really Got Me Now	The Unbeatable Squirrel Girl (vol. 2) #1–6, Howard the Duck (vol. 6) #6	14 June 2016	9781302486334
The Unbeatable Squirrel Girl Vol. 4: I Kissed a Squirrel and I Liked it	The Unbeatable Squirrel Girl (vol. 2) #7–11	6 December 2016	9780785196273
The Unbeatable Squirrel Girl Vol. 5: Like I'm the Only Squirrel in the World	The Unbeatable Squirrel Girl (vol. 2) #12–16	4 April 2017	9781302903282
The Unbeatable Squirrel Girl Vol. 6: Who Run the World? Squirrels	The Unbeatable Squirrel Girl (vol. 2) #17–21	10 October 2017	9781302906641
The Unbeatable Squirrel Girl Vol. 7: I've Been Waiting For a Squirrel Like You	The Unbeatable Squirrel Girl (vol. 2) #22-26 and material from A Year of Marvels: Unbeatable #1	13 March 2018	9781302906658
The Unbeatable Squirrel Girl Vol. 8: My Best Friend's Squirrel	The Unbeatable Squirrel Girl (vol. 2) #27-31 and material from Not Brand Echh #14	3 July 2018	9781302910761
The Unbeatable Squirrel Girl Vol. 9: Squirrels Fall Like Dominoes	The Unbeatable Squirrel Girl (vol. 2) #32-36	27 November 2018	9781302910778
The Unbeatable Squirrel Girl Vol. 10: Life is Too Short, Squirrel	The Unbeatable Squirrel Girl (vol. 2) #37-41	19 March 2019	9781302914479
The Unbeatable Squirrel Girl Vol. 11: Call Your Squirrelfriend	The Unbeatable Squirrel Girl (vol. 2) #42-46	24 September 2019	9781302914486
The Unbeatable Squirrel Girl Vol. 12: To All The Squirrels I've Loved Before	The Unbeatable Squirrel Girl (vol. 2) #47-50	10 March 2020	9781302917241

The series has been collected into three mid-size graphic novels:

Title	Material collected	Publication date	ISBN
The Unbeatable Squirrel Girl: Powers of a Squirrel	The Unbeatable Squirrel Girl (vol. 1) #1–8	January 7, 2020	9781302920456
The Unbeatable Squirrel Girl: Big Squirrels Don't Cry	The Unbeatable Squirrel Girl (vol. 2) #1–11, Howard the Duck (vol. 6) #6	June 25, 2020	9781302921163
The Unbeatable Squirrel Girl: Squirrels Just Wanna Have Fun	The Unbeatable Squirrel Girl (vol. 2) #12–22	September 7, 2021	9781302929909

The series has been collected into Hardcover:

Title	Material collected	Publication date	ISBN
The Unbeatable Squirrel Girl Vol. 1	The Unbeatable Squirrel Girl (vol. 1) #1–8, Marvel Super-Heroes #8, and material from GLX-Mas Special #1, The Thing (vol. 2) #8, Age of Heroes #3	15 November 2016	9781302902247
The Unbeatable Squirrel Girl Vol. 2	The Unbeatable Squirrel Girl (vol. 2) #1–11, Howard the Duck (vol. 6) #6	16 May 2017	9781302903732
The Unbeatable Squirrel Girl Vol. 3	The Unbeatable Squirrel Girl (vol. 2) #12–21	20 March 2018	9781302908447
The Unbeatable Squirrel Girl Vol. 4	The Unbeatable Squirrel Girl (vol. 2) #22–31, and material from A Year Of Marvels: Unbeatable #1, Not Brand Echh #14	5 February 2019	9781302915445
The Unbeatable Squirrel Girl Omnibus	The Unbeatable Squirrel Girl (vol. 1) #1-8, The Unbeatable Squirrel Girl (vol. 2) #1-50, The Unbeatable Squirrel Girl Beats Up the Marvel Universe, Howard the Duck (vol. 6) #6, and material from A Year of Marvels: Unbeatable #1, Not Brand Echh #14	7 February 2023	978-1302950613

=== Graphic novel ===
Squirrel Girl has also been featured in a graphic novel written by The Unbeatable Squirrel Girl's creative team released as an independent story.

Title	Pages	Publication date	ISBN
The Unbeatable Squirrel Girl Beats Up the Marvel Universe	120 pages	October 2016	9781302903039

=== Novels ===
Squirrel Girl has also been featured in two middle grade novels.

Title	Author	Publication date	ISBN
The Unbeatable Squirrel Girl: Squirrel Meets World	Shannon Hale & Dean Hale	February 7, 2017	9781484781548
The Unbeatable Squirrel Girl: 2 Fuzzy, 2 Furious	Shannon Hale & Dean Hale	March 6, 2018	978-1368011266

== In other media ==
- Milana Vayntrub was cast to star as Squirrel Girl in the live-action Marvel Cinematic Universe (MCU) pilot New Warriors, a partial adaptation of The Unbeatable Squirrel Girl; while this pilot was ultimately unaired, Vayntrub vocally reprised the role in the 2018 animated film Marvel Rising: Secret Warriors and subsequent 2018–2019 media franchise, appearing in every instalment.
- In 2018, Sony Pictures announced the development of a Kraven the Hunter film as part of the Sony's Spider-Man Universe (SSU) with Richard Wenk writing and eyeing Antoine Fuqua to direct, in which the character would be depicted as an antihero, a concept originating from The Unbeatable Squirrel Girl. In 2020, the studio hired J. C. Chandor to direct and Art Marcum and Matt Holloway to rewrite the script. In May 2021, it was confirmed that Aaron Taylor-Johnson would portray the character. The film was released on December 13, 2024, without Squirrel Girl.
- In 2019, a stage play adaptation of The Unbeatable Squirrel Girl produced by Concord Theatricals and titled Squirrel Girl Goes to College: A Squirrel Girl Play, began airing from Riverton High, with the title character portrayed by Alyssa Buckner.
