= Night Thrasher =

In comics, Night Thrasher may refer to:

- Night Thrasher (Dwayne Taylor), the first Night Thrasher, a fictional superhero appearing in books published by Marvel Comics
- Donyell Taylor, brother of Dwayne, the second Marvel Comics superhero to take on the identity of Night Thrasher
