= List of Lethal Legion members =

The Lethal Legion is a team of fictional characters that appear in comic books published by Marvel Comics.

The first version of the Legion appears in The Avengers #78 (Jul. 1970); the second version in Avengers #164 (Oct. 1977); the third version in West Coast Avengers vol. 2, #1 (Oct. 1985); the fourth version in Avengers West Coast #98 (Sep. 1993), and the final version in the limited series Dark Reign: Lethal Legion #1 (Aug. 2009). The teams were created by Roy Thomas and John Buscema; Jim Shooter and various artists; Steve Englehart and Al Milgrom; Roy Thomas and Tim Dzon; and Frank Tieri and various artists respectively.

== Grim Reaper's Lethal Legion ==
Avengers #78–79 (Jul.–Aug. 1970)

- Grim Reaper: Madman with a hand replaced by a scythe that harbours powerful technology.
- Living Laser: An inventor of highly advanced lasers.
- Man-Ape: One of Wakanda's greatest warriors who performed a forbidden ritual that gave him superhuman strength.
- Power Man (Erik Josten): Gained superhuman strength and durability due to an ionic ray.
- Swordsman (Jacques Duquesne): A master swordsman with different weapons in his sword.

== Count Nefaria's Lethal Legion ==
Avengers #164–166 (Oct.–Dec. 1977)

- Count Nefaria: A crime lord and one of the world's wealthiest men.
- Living Laser
- Power Man (Erik Josten)
- Whirlwind: A mutant who can rotate his body at superhuman speed.

== Grim Reaper's second Lethal Legion ==
West Coast Avengers vol. 2, #1–2 (Oct.–Nov. 1985)

- Grim Reaper
- Black Talon: A voodoo sorcerer who can create and control zombies.
- Goliath (Erik Josten): A man who can grow up to 60 ft.
- Man-Ape
- Nekra: A death-spirit.
- Ultron: A powerful and intelligent robot.

== Porcupine's Lethal Legion ==
Marvel Age Annual #1 (1985)

- Attuma: An Atlantean barbarian.
- Batroc the Leaper: A skilled French combatant.
- Beetle: An engineer who invented a battle suit that enables flight and has other functions.
- Black Tiger
- Kurr'fri: A member of the Saurians that Ms. Marvel had encountered.
- Gorilla-Man
- Piledriver
- Porcupine: A criminal with a battle suit based on a porcupine.
- Sabretooth: A beast-like mutant.
- Thundra: A super-strong woman.
- Trapster: A criminal skilled with adhesives.
- Unicorn
- Whirlwind
- Wrecker: A criminal with an enchanted crowbar giving him superhuman strength.

== Satannish's Lethal Legion ==
Avengers West Coast #98–100 (Sep.–Nov. 1993)

- Hangman (Jason Roland)
- Axe of Violence: A demonically-enhanced Lizzie Borden with an axe replacing one hand.
- Coldsteel: A demonically-enhanced Josef Stalin, now an 8 ft. giant with superhuman strength.
- Cyana: A demonically-enhanced Lucrezia Borgia with poisoned claws.
- Zyklon: A demonically-enhanced Heinrich Himmler who can belch deadly gas fumes from his mouth.

== Grim Reaper's third Lethal Legion ==
Dark Reign: Lethal Legion #1–3 (June–Aug. 2009)

- Grim Reaper
- Nekra
- Absorbing Man: A thug who was given a potion enabling him to absorb the properties of whatever he touched.
- Grey Gargoyle: A French chemist who can turn people to stone for an hour by touching them.
- Tiger Shark: A criminal with the DNA of a shark.
- Mister Hyde: A scientist who developed a formula that gives him superhuman strength.
- Wonder Man: Given superhuman strength and durability by an ionic ray.

== Grandmaster's Lethal Legion ==
Avengers #676 (Jan. 2018)

- Blood Brothers: Two Roclites.
- Captain Glory: A Kree who was a captain in the Kree Armada.
- Drall: An Endrionic gladiator.
- Mentacle: A Rigellian with four tentacles for legs who has psychic abilities.
- Metal Master: An Astran who admired the works of his predecessor.
- The Other: An unspecified alien.

== Count Nefaria's second Lethal Legion ==
Amazing Spider-Man Vol. 5 #41 (March 2020)

- Count Nefaria: Leader
- Grey Gargoyle
- Living Laser
- Whirlwind

== Hank Pym's Lethal Legion ==
Avengers Inc. #4-5 (December 2023-February 2024)

- Hank Pym: Leader
- Black Ant: A Life Model Decoy of Eric O'Grady.
- Ultron-12: He possessed the "Victor Shade" persona that was implanted into Whirlwind's body.
- Blizzard (Donnie Gill): A NuHuman with a suit that emit a freeze ray.
- Bullet: A covert agent of the United States government and mercenary.
- Cobra (Piet Voorhees): The nephew of King Cobra who has the same powers as him.
- Lodestone: A magnetic supervillain.
- Mortar: A former member of the Bastards of Evil with a liquid-stone body who is the alleged daughter of Grey Gargoyle.
- Oddball (Orville Bock): A supervillain with enhanced juggling and street-fighting skills.
- Piecemeal (Cyborg version): A cyborg created by scientists working for Red Skull.
- Speed Demon: A former Squadron Sinister member with super-speed.
- Sunstroke: A supervillain with solar-energy absorption.
- Supercharger: A supervillain who can absorb, store, and release great amounts of electrical energy.

== Other media ==
=== The Super Hero Squad Show version ===
The following are members of the Lethal Legion in The Super Hero Squad Show and its related media:

- Doctor Doom (leader)
- Abomination
- Absorbing Man
- AIM agents
- Baron Mordo
- Batroc the Leaper
- Blob
- Crimson Dynamo
- Doctor Octopus
- Doombots
- Dormammu
- Egghead
- Enchantress
- Fin Fang Foom
- Grogg
- Groot
- Impossible Man
- Juggernaut
- Klaw
- Loki
- Magneto
- Manoo
- Megataur
- Melter
- MODOK
- Mole Man
- Molecule Man
- Moloids
- Mystique
- Plantman
- Pyro
- Quasimodo
- Red Skull
- Ringmaster
- Sabertooth
- Screaming Mimi
- Sentinels
- Stilt-Man
- Super-Skrull
- Skurge
- Tiger Shark
- Titanium Man
- Toad
- Trapster
- Tricephalous
- Volcana
- Whiplash
- Whirlwind
- Wrecking Crew
  - Bulldozer
  - Piledriver
  - Thunderball
  - The Wrecker
- X the Unknowable
- Ymir
- Zzzax
