= List of Legion of the Unliving members =

The Legion of the Unliving is the name of five groups of fictional characters that appear in comic books published by Marvel Comics.

The five versions first appear in Avengers #131 (Jan. 1975); Avengers Annual #16 (Dec. 1987); Avengers West Coast #61 (Aug. 1990); Avengers #353 (Sep. 1992) and Avengers vol. 3, #10 (Nov. 1998) respectively. The groups were created by Steve Englehart and Sal Buscema; Tom DeFalco and various artists; Roy Thomas and Daniel Bulanadi; Len Kaminski and M.C. Wyman and Kurt Busiek and George Pérez.

== Membership ==
listed alphabetically, after leader

=== First Legion of the Unliving ===
Avengers #131 - 132 (Jan. - Feb. 1975); Giant-Size Avengers #3 (Feb. 1975)

- Heinrich Zemo - A Nazi scientist.
- Flying Dutchman's Ghost - Also referred to as the Captain of the Flying Dutchman.
- Frankenstein's Monster - A simulacrum created by Victor Frankenstein.
- Human Torch - A pyrokinetic android.
- Midnight - A martial artist. He is also known as Midnight Sun.
- Wonder Man - An ionic-powered superhero.

=== Second Legion of the Unliving ===
Avengers Annual #16 (Dec. 1987)

- Baron Blood - A vampire.
- Black Knight (Sir Percy) - A black knight from the medieval times.
- Bucky Barnes - The sidekick of Captain America (it was later revealed Bucky never actually died).
- Captain Marvel - A Kree superhero.
- Death Adder - A death adder-themed villain (later revived).
- Dracula - A vampire lord (at the time all vampires in the Marvel Universe had been destroyed).
- Drax the Destroyer - A human enhanced by Kronos. (later revived)
- Executioner - An Asgardian half-giant.
- Green Goblin (Bart Hamilton)
- Hyperion - This is the Squadron Sinister version.
- Korvac - A computer technician from Earth-691.
- Nighthawk - The CEO of Richmond Enterprises.
- Red Guardian (Alexei Shostakov) - A superhero who was around during World War II.
- Swordsman (Jacques Duquesne) - A sword-wielding villain turned Avenger.
- Terrax - A Herald of Galactus. (later revived)

=== Third Legion of the Unliving ===
Avengers West Coast #61 (Aug. 1990)

- Black Knight (Nathan Garrett) - A descendant of Sir Percy of Scandia and an enemy of Giant-Man who uses an arsenal of medieval weapons that employ modern technology (including a lance that fired bolts of energy) and genetically engineers and creates a winged horse called Aragorn.
- Grim Reaper - The criminal brother of Wonder Man.
- Iron Man 2020 - A counterpart of Iron Man from the year 2020 on Earth-8410.
- Left-Winger and Right-Winger - A wrestling duo. They were not actually dead but in comas.
- Oort the Living Comet - A super-fast character from the future who claims to be an enemy of Quicksilver.
- Swordsman (Jacques Duquesne)
- Toro - A pyrokinetic partner of the Human Torch android.

=== Fourth Legion of the Unliving ===
Avengers #353 (Sep. 1992)

- Amenhotep - An ancient vampire.
- Baron Heinrich Zemo
- Count Nefaria - A Maggia crimelord with ion-based abilities.
- Inferno - A steel-skinned supervillain who can generate heat.
- Nebulon - An Ul'lula'n.
- Necrodamus - A sorcerer.
- Red Guardian (Alexi Shostakov)
- Star Stalker - A mutant Vorm.

=== Fifth Legion of the Unliving ===
Avengers vol. 3, #10 (Nov. 1998)

- Captain Marvel
- Doctor Druid - A druid.
- Grim Reaper
- Hellcat - A cat-themed superhero.
- Mockingbird - This version is a Skrull imposter.
- Swordsman (Jacques Duquesne)
- Thunderstrike - A former host of Thor.
- Wonder Man

=== Sixth Legion of the Unliving ===
Avengers vol. 8 #12 (January 2019)

- Shadow Colonel - Leader. The Son of Dracula.
- Baroness Blood - The daughter of a Dracula loyalist who was turned into a vampire by Baron Blood.
- Carpathian - A bat-like vampire.
- Rat Bomber - A vampire with rodent control who owns rats that are strapped to sunburst grenades.
- Snowsnake - A 300 year old vampire from Japan with an elongating tongue who is an expert fencer.
  - Sarge - The pet hellhound of Snowsnake.

=== Seventh Legion of the Unliving ===
Moon Knight: City of the Dead #1 (September 2023)

- Anubis - Benefactor
- Jackal Knight - Leader
- Black Spectre (Carson Knowles) - An enemy of Moon Knight who previously died falling off a roof while fighting him.
- Chainsaw - The chainsaw-wielding masked leader of the Praetorian Brotherhood, a white supremacist biker gang that worked for Secret Empire. He previously perished in a warehouse collapse while fighting Moon Knight.
- Master Sniper - An assassin who wields an forearm-mounted pistol. He was previously killed in an avalanche caused by Moon Knight.
- Midnight - A cyborg who was previously killed when Moon Knight sent a clock hand into his head.
- Plasma - A former archaeologist-turned-cult leader with plasma blast abilities, who was previously killed in a subway crash while fighting Moon Knight.
- Taurus (Cornelius van Lunt) - The founder of the original Zodiac who wore a cattle-like suit. He previously died in an airplane crash when fighting Moon Knight.
