= Man-Ape =

- Artwork from Black Panther #49; Art by Sal Velluto.

Publication information
- Publisher: Marvel Comics
- First appearance: The Avengers #62 (March 1969)
- Created by: Roy Thomas; John Buscema

In-story information
- Alter ego: M'Baku
- Species: Human mutate
- Team affiliations: Lethal Legion; Masters of Evil; Villains for Hire
- Partnerships: Grim Reaper; Saboteur
- Notable aliases: White Gorilla
- Abilities: Superhuman strength, agility, stamina and durability; Expert hand to hand combatant

Man-Ape (M'Baku) is a supervillain appearing in American comic books published by Marvel Comics. Created by Roy Thomas and John Buscema, the character first appeared in The Avengers #62 (March 1969). Man-Ape is depicted as a frequent adversary of the superhero Black Panther.

Man-Ape has made scattered appearances on animated television series and video games. Winston Duke portrays a variation of the character in the Marvel Cinematic Universe films Black Panther (2018), Avengers: Infinity War (2018), Avengers: Endgame (2019), Black Panther: Wakanda Forever (2022), and the upcoming Avengers: Doomsday (2026).

== Publication history ==
Man-Ape first appeared in The Avengers #62 (March 1969). He was created by Roy Thomas and John Buscema. He appears again in The Avengers #78 (July 1970), West Coast Avengers #1 (September 1984), and The Vision and the Scarlet Witch vol. 2 #2 (November 1985).

== Fictional character biography ==
M'Baku was born in Wakanda. He became one of Wakanda's greatest warriors, second only to Black Panther. He plotted to usurp the throne of Wakanda with the help of the outlawed rival White Gorilla Cult and return Wakanda to a primitive state.

M'Baku becomes a renegade and gains superhuman powers by killing a white gorilla, bathing in its blood, and eating its flesh, taking the alias of Man-Ape. He battles Black Panther and is believed to be killed when the Panther Totem that he bound Black Panther to crumbled and buries him instead. He is revived by his aide N'Gamo and goes to America to battle the Avengers.

He allies himself with the original Lethal Legion made up of Grim Reaper, Living Laser, Power Man (Erik Josten), and Swordsman. He is the first member met by the Avengers. He attacks Captain America, but is beaten back by the rest of the Avengers. He then captures the Black Panther's girlfriend Monica Lynne, binding her hand and foot with metal clamps. Black Panther is lured into a trap and knocked out by an exploding dummy of Lynne. He is chained up and meets the other members. The Legion straps Black Panther and Lynne to chairs before leaving, though he is able to escape and contact the other members. The Legion is defeated by the Avengers after Vision overcomes Power Man and frees the other members. Black Panther banishes Man-Ape from Wakanda on order of execution if he returns.

Man-Ape is apparently killed by Morlun while defending his people from Morlun's attack. Before his apparent death, he sends an envoy to Wakanda to warn them of the approaching danger. Man-Ape later appears alive as a member of Purple Man's Villains for Hire.

== Powers and abilities ==
The Man-Ape gained superhuman powers by consuming the flesh of a sacred white gorilla and bathing in white gorilla blood, enchanting him through the mystical transference of the abilities of the rare Wakandan white gorilla. M'Baku's mystically augmented powers include superhuman strength, speed, agility, stamina and durability equal to that of the mystical Wakandan white gorilla.

He has extensive formal military training in hand-to-hand combat from the Wakandan Royal Militia.

== Reception ==
=== Accolades ===
- In 2018, ComicBook.com ranked Man-Ape 3rd in their "8 Best Black Panther Villains" list and included him in their "7 Great Villains for Black Panther 2" list.
- In 2020, Comic Book Resources (CBR) ranked Man-Ape 2nd in their "Marvel: Ranking Black Panther's Rogues Gallery" list.
- In 2022, Screen Rant included Man-Ape in their "15 Most Powerful Black Panther Villains" list.
- In 2022, CBR ranked Man-Ape 3rd in their "10 Most Iconic Black Panther Villains" list.

== In other media ==
=== Television ===
- Man-Ape appears in The Avengers: Earth's Mightiest Heroes, voiced by Kevin Michael Richardson.
- M'Baku appears in Avengers Assemble, voiced by Ike Amadi. This version is a member of the Shadow Council.

=== Film ===
M'Baku appears in films set in the Marvel Cinematic Universe (MCU), portrayed by Winston Duke. This version is the leader of the renegade Jabari Tribe, who shun Wakanda's technological society and have a religious reverence for gorillas. M'Baku is introduced in Black Panther (2018), and makes subsequent appearances in Avengers: Infinity War (2018), Avengers: Endgame (2019), and Black Panther: Wakanda Forever (2022). Duke will reprise his role as M'Baku in Avengers: Doomsday (2026).

=== Video games ===
- Man-Ape appears as a boss in Marvel: Ultimate Alliance 2, voiced by Emerson Franklin.
- Man-Ape appears as a boss in Marvel: Avengers Alliance. This version is the leader of the White Gorillas.
- Man-Ape appears as a boss in Marvel Heroes.
- Man-Ape appears as a playable character in the "Black Panther" DLC for Lego Marvel's Avengers.
- Man-Ape appears as a playable character in Lego Marvel Super Heroes 2, voiced by Alexis Rodney.
