= Absorbing Man =

Marvel Comics supervillain

- Absorbing Man as depicted in Journey into Mystery #122 (November 1965). Art by Jack Kirby.

Publication information
- Publisher: Marvel Comics
- First appearance: Journey into Mystery #114 (March 1965)
- Created by: Stan Lee; Jack Kirby

In-story information
- Full name: Carl Creel
- Species: Human mutate (Note: In Marvel comics, the term "mutate" is used as a noun to designate characters that received superpowers from an external source, as opposed to Marvel's mutants.)
- Team affiliations: Masters of Evil; They Who Wield Power; Astonishing Avengers; Legion Accursed; Lethal Legion; Worthy; Gamma Flight
- Partnerships: Titania
- Notable aliases: Absorbing Man; Lightningbolt; Greithoth; Rocky Davis; Red Dog; Harold
- Abilities: Matter absorption and replication; Ball and chain proficiency

Absorbing Man (Carl "Crusher" Creel) is a character appearing in American comic books published by Marvel Comics. Created by writer Stan Lee and writer-artist Jack Kirby, the character first appeared in Journey into Mystery #114 (March 1965) as an enemy of Thor before going on to menace other superheroes, including the Avengers, Daredevil, and Spider-Man. Carl Creel is a professional boxer and criminal who drinks a magic potion created by Loki, gaining the power to absorb and become any material he touches. Originally a supervillain, he eventually reformed to become an antihero.

Since his original introduction in comics, the character has been featured in various other Marvel-licensed products, including video games, animated television series, and merchandise such as trading cards. Carl Creel made his live-action debut in the Marvel Cinematic Universe (MCU) television series Agents of S.H.I.E.L.D., portrayed by Brian Patrick Wade.

== Publication history ==
The Absorbing Man debuted in Journey into Mystery #114 (March 1965), and was created by Stan Lee and Jack Kirby. He appeared in the 2017 Black Bolt series, written by Saladin Ahmed.

== Fictional character biography ==
Absorbing Man as depicted in Thor #376 (February 1987). Art by Walt Simonson.

Carl "Crusher" Creel was a boxer and jailed criminal who becomes the Absorbing Man when he drinks a liquid which the Asgardian god Loki laced with a mystical potion. Discovering that he could absorb the properties of anything he touched, Creel escapes prison by absorbing metal from the guards' bullets and goes on to battle Thor. When he escapes, he takes with him the ball and chain to which he was shackled, and uses the ball and chain as a weapon. Although he is only mortal, Creel's fantastic abilities make him a worthy opponent for Thor, who is later forced to end the battle due to Loki's kidnapping of Jane Foster. Creel then breaks into a house and attacks the occupants. Thor comes to the rescue and tricks Creel into changing his atomic structure into pure helium. Thor accomplishes this by using his hammer's powers to transform the ground's molecular makeup. As Creel is acquiring additional mass from direct contact with the Earth when this happens, he drifts harmlessly into the atmosphere.

A short time later, Loki retrieves Creel from space using Asgardian technology after he has knocked out an Asgardian warlock and sends Creel back to battle Thor. After Creel is nearly beaten due to Thor's fighting skill, Loki transports him to Asgard and reveals the true source of his "absorbing" powers. After being humbled by Loki, Creel agrees to act as his agent, and he is directed to take over the city. The Absorbing Man defeats the Asgardian legions without too much trouble and eventually confronts Odin himself. Creel absorbs Odin's attacks and then the properties of Asgard itself, hoping to rule the universe, and he towers over Odin as Loki arrives to gloat. Thor is ordered by Odin not to keep attacking. Loki and Creel are then beaten by trickery; once given Odin's Rod of Rulership the two quarrel over it, with the Absorbing Man trying to absorb the rod, and the two find that they cannot let go. Odin then advises them that his power lies not in a mere object, but deep within himself. The pair are then banished into outer space.

The Absorbing Man eventually returns on a comet and battles the Hulk. Bruce Banner had been sent to divert the comet, as it was feared it was radioactive, but the Absorbing Man leaped aboard and began absorbing the Hulk's strength. He tries to bury the Hulk under a mountain, but when the Hulk turns back to human form, the Absorbing Man is unable to support the great weight and is buried.

However, Creel goes on to battle many other heroes, such as the Avengers, Daredevil, Dazzler, the Hulk, and Spider-Man. He is one of the villains who participates in the Secret Wars, and also develops a romantic relationship with the super-strong villainess Titania. The pair also join the reformed fourth version of the Masters of Evil. Creel has several more battles with Thor (and the Eric Masterson Thor) and a skirmish with the cosmic hero Quasar. Although he assisted Crossbones in a plan to attack Captain America, when Absorbing Man learned that Crossbones intended to detonate a bomb in New York, he absorbed the properties of Captain America's shield to contain the blast, declaring that he was not a murderer.

The Absorbing Man escapes prison and allies with the Owl as an enforcer, but finds himself opposed by Spider-Man and new hero Ethan Edwards (later revealed to be a disguised Skrull). He is briefly trapped and converted into a new form of cocaine by one of the Owl's operatives when they become frustrated with his unprofessional approach, with the new drug briefly giving those who snort him a degree of his powers, but he reassembles himself and goes after the Owl for revenge. Spider-Man defeats Creel by tricking him into running a gauntlet where he absorbs multiple objects thrown at him, culminating in Creel absorbing two different chemicals that cause him to explode.

The Absorbing Man later battles and is apparently killed by the hero Sentry during the events of Civil War. However, he later appears at the funeral of Stilt-Man.

During the Dark Reign storyline, Creel joins a new version of the Lethal Legion led by the Grim Reaper. After a defeat, Creel escapes prison and absorbs a shard of the Cosmic Cube.

The Absorbing Man suffers a setback when villain Norman Osborn uses an enchanted sword—provided by Loki—to remove his absorbing powers completely. Creel regains his powers and storms Avengers Tower to recover his ball and chain. He is defeated by Avengers' coordinators Maria Hill, Sharon Carter, and Victoria Hand after absorbing the latter's cold.

During the "Fear Itself" storyline, Creel and Titania encounter two of the divine hammers that contain the essences of the Worthy, generals to Odin's brother and adversary, Cul Borson. Coming into contact with the hammers, Titania and Creel were transformed into Skirn: Breaker of Men and Greithoth: Breaker of Wills, respectively. They later went on a rampage depicted in a number of Fear Itself tie-in issues, most prominently Avengers Academy #15–19 and Iron Man 2.0 #5–6, as well as that storyline's core miniseries.

During the "AXIS" storyline, Absorbing Man appears as a member of Magneto's group during the fight against Red Onslaught. He is briefly converted to heroism when everyone on the island experiences a moral inversion as Doctor Doom and Scarlet Witch attempt to awaken Charles Xavier's brain in Red Skull. Absorbing Man later reverts to villainy when the inversion is undone.

During the "Avengers: Standoff!" storyline, Absorbing Man appears as an inmate of Pleasant Hill, a gated community established by S.H.I.E.L.D. Using Kobik, S.H.I.E.L.D. transformed Absorbing Man into a civilian named Harold. During his time as Harold, Absorbing Man ran an ice cream parlor and was in love with Sheriff Eva. When Helmut Zemo and Fixer restored the memories of the inmates, Absorbing Man joined in on their uprising with Whirlwind. Illuminati members Hood and Titania arrived at Pleasant Hill to retrieve Absorbing Man. Although he was shaken from having a S.H.I.E.L.D.-induced normal life, Absorbing Man sides with the Illuminati as they work to assemble the other inmates to get revenge on S.H.I.E.L.D.

In the "Secret Empire" storyline, Absorbing Man is recruited by Baron Helmut Zemo to join the Army of Evil.

After Absorbing Man was imprisoned for another crime, his lawyer convinced him to join the U.S. Hulk Operations as an alternative to getting incarcerated for life. He gets injected with a Bannerman Gene-Enhancement Package that turned him into a gamma mutate able to absorb gamma radiation, at the cost of turning his skin a bright red color. When Absorbing Man - under the alias of Red Dog - fought Hulk at Los Diablos Missile Base, an entity called the One Below All entered his body after he absorbed most of the Hulk's gamma energy. The One Below All taunted Red Dog's astral body before ripping his physical one in half. Absorbing Man, still controlled by The One Below All, continues fighting Hulk. Absorbing Man ran off when Jackie McGee, Walter Langkowski, and Puck showed up. When the One Below All successfully opened the door to the Below Place, the lowest point of Hell, the entirety of New Mexico gets transported there as Absorbing Man weeps. With the help of Puck, Creel was able to transfer the gamma energy he had absorbed back into Hulk, who used his thunder clap to disperse the One Below All's cloud form and transport New Mexico back to Earth. Creel has since been freed of the One Below All's influence, having transferred the gamma radiation back to the Hulk. He goes on to join Gamma Flight.

== Powers and abilities ==
Carl Creel has the ability to mimic the matter or strength of anything nearby or anyone he is near. Most commonly, the Absorbing Man uses his powers to duplicate the qualities of anything that he touches—solids, liquids, gases, or even energy sources. This transformation also extends to the items that Creel was wearing and carrying when Loki's magic potion took effect (for example, if Creel touches the metal titanium, his body, clothes, and wrecking ball takes on its appearance and properties). He can absorb sufficient mass from a large object (e.g., a building) to attain the same height. While in different alternate forms, he still maintains his intellect, capacity for speech, and full physical movement (although his first attempt at absorbing water temporarily cost Creel's sanity when he tried to keep himself from drifting apart in the ocean). His body was able to reform itself after being broken or damaged, especially a severed arm which Wolverine cuts off during the Secret Wars.

=== Equipment ===
Absorbing Man is also shown to wield a ball and chain when in battle.

== Reception ==
=== Critical response ===
Drew Atchison of Screen Rant included Absorbing Man their "Hulk's Main Comic Book Villains, Ranked Lamest To Coolest" list, writing, "Teaming up with the Inhuman king, Black Bolt, to siding with Gamma Flight to take on the Immortal Hulk, Carl's been through a lot and deserves to return to the MCU." Comic Book Resources ranked Absorbing Man 3rd in their "10 Strongest Marvel Henchmen" list, 4th in their "10 Villains Fans Hope To See In Marvel's She-Hulk Series" list, 4th in their "10 Best B-List Avengers Villains" list, 5th in their "Top 10 She-Hulk Villains" list, 5th in their "10 Strongest Marvel Human Villains" list, 6th in their "Age Of Apocalypse: The 30 Strongest Characters In Marvel's Coolest Alternate World" list, 7th in their "Hulk's 10 Most Powerful Villains" list, 8th in their "Marvel: 10 Villains Who Keep Getting Stronger" list, 9th in their "Thor: 10 Most Dangerous Villains He's Ever Fought" list, and 12th in their "Hulk's 20 Most Powerful Enemies" list.

== Other versions ==
=== Age of Apocalypse ===
An alternate universe version of Carl Creel from Earth-295 appears in Age of Apocalypse. This version works as a prison camp warden in Mexico.

=== Earth X ===
An alternate universe version of Carl Creel from Earth-9997 appears in Earth X.

=== House of M ===
An alternate universe version of Carl Creel from Earth-58163 appears in House of M. This version is a member of the Hood's Masters of Evil.

=== JLA/Avengers ===
Absorbing Man appears in JLA/Avengers as a brainwashed minion of Krona.

=== Marvel Apes ===
An alternate universe version of Absorbing Man from Earth-95019 appears in Marvel Apes. This version is a mandrill called Absorbing Mandrill and a member of the Master Brotherhood of Evil Apes.

=== Marvel Zombies ===
An alternate version of Carl Creel appears in the Marvel Zombies reality. Carl Creel is a zombie working for the zombie Kingpin. He battles the interloper Machine Man while in stone form. He is tricked into absorbing the weak physicality of the zombie Karnak and Machine Man swiftly destroys his head.

=== Old Man Logan ===
An alternate version of Carl Creel appears on Earth-807128 during the original Old Man Logan storyline. A group modeled after Absorbing Man called the Creel Gang appears as well.

== In other media ==
=== Television ===
- Absorbing Man appears in The Marvel Super Heroes, voiced by Tom Harvey.
- Carl Creel / Absorbing Man appears in The Incredible Hulk (1996) episode "They Call Me Mr. Fixit", voiced by Jim Cummings. This version is an enforcer for crime boss Miss Allure.
- Absorbing Man appears in The Avengers: United They Stand episode "Command Decision", voiced by Oliver Becker. This version is a member of Baron Helmut Zemo's Masters of Evil.
- Absorbing Man appears in The Avengers: Earth's Mightiest Heroes, voiced by Rick D. Wasserman. This version's powers are derived from gamma radiation.
- Absorbing Man appears in the Ultimate Spider-Man episode "Contest of Champions", voiced by Jonathan Adams.
- Absorbing Man appears in Avengers Assemble, initially voiced again by Jonathan Adams and subsequently by Gregg Berger.
- Absorbing Man appears in Hulk and the Agents of S.M.A.S.H., voiced again by Jonathan Adams.
- Carl Creel appears in television series set in the Marvel Cinematic Universe (MCU).
  - Creel primarily appears in Agents of S.H.I.E.L.D., portrayed by Brian Patrick Wade. He first appears in the second season episodes "Shadows" and "Heavy is the Head" as a Hydra operative. As of the third season episode "The Inside Man", Creel defected to the U.S. government and became Glenn Talbot's bodyguard. In the fifth season, Creel reluctantly rejoins Hydra in their plot to save the world from Thanos, only to be absorbed by Talbot via gravitonium.
  - Creel is mentioned in a flashback in the Daredevil episode "Cut Man", which is set in the 1990s while he was at the height of his boxing career. He is set to have a match with Jack Murdock, with the latter being expected to drop in the fifth round at Roscoe Sweeney's "suggestion". Instead, Jack chooses to set a better example for his son Matt and wins the fight off-screen via knockout. Series producer Jeph Loeb confirmed that this is the same Creel that appears in Agents of S.H.I.E.L.D. before gaining his abilities.
- Absorbing Man appears in Marvel Disk Wars: The Avengers, voiced by Yasuhiko Kawazu in the Japanese version and by John Eric Bentley in the English dub.
- Absorbing Man appears in the Spider-Man episode "Screwball Live", voiced again by Gregg Berger.
- Absorbing Man appears in Marvel Super Hero Adventures, voiced by Michael Dobson.
- Absorbing Man appears in Iron Man and His Awesome Friends, voiced by Talon Warburton. This version sports an arm device with a retractable ball and chain that also doubles as a claw. In addition, some properties he absorbs can grant him other abilities like bouncing from a pair of rubber boots, cryokinesis from an ice block, and magnetism manipulation from a magnetic invention.

=== Film ===
- The Absorbing Man was featured in several scrapped scripts for Hulk, with one seeing him being reimagined as computer engineer Robert Creel.

=== Video games ===
- Absorbing Man appears in The Incredible Hulk (1994).
- Absorbing Man appears as a boss in Marvel: Ultimate Alliance 2, voiced by John DiMaggio.
- Absorbing Man appears as a playable character in Lego Marvel Super Heroes, voiced again by John DiMaggio.
- Absorbing Man appears in Marvel Avengers Alliance.
- Absorbing Man appears in Marvel Contest of Champions.
- Absorbing Man appears as a playable character in Marvel: Future Fight.
- Absorbing Man appears as a playable character in Lego Marvel's Avengers.
- Absorbing Man appears as a playable character in Marvel Strike Force.
- Absorbing Man appears in Marvel Snap.
