= Marvel MaXimum Collection =

2026 video game

- Developer: Limited Run Games
- Publisher: Limited Run Games
- Engine: Carbon Engine
- Platforms: Nintendo Switch; PlayStation 5; Windows; Xbox Series X/S
- Release: March 27, 2026
- Modes: Single-player, multiplayer

Marvel MaXimum Collection is a 2026 video game compilation published by Limited Run Games. It includes six games based on Marvel Comics characters, originally released between 1990–1995. It was released for Nintendo Switch, PlayStation 5, Windows, and Xbox Series X/S in March 2026.

== Content ==
Marvel MaXimum Collection contains six different Marvel video games, many of which are available in multiple versions originally published for different consoles. All games support rewinding gameplay and save states, toggleable cheats, and optional visual filters. X-Men also supports online multiplayer with rollback netcode for up to six players. Other features include an in-game music player and a gallery of original game artwork, box art, manuals, and other print material.

Games in the collection
Title	NES	Arcade	Genesis	SNES	Game Boy	Game Gear
Silver Surfer	Yes	—N/a	—N/a	—N/a	—N/a	—N/a
Captain America and The Avengers	Yes	Yes	Yes	—N/a	—N/a	—N/a
X-Men	—N/a	Yes	—N/a	—N/a	—N/a	—N/a
Spider-Man and the X-Men in Arcade's Revenge	—N/a	—N/a	Yes	Yes	Yes	Yes
Spider-Man and Venom: Maximum Carnage	—N/a	—N/a	Yes	Yes	—N/a	—N/a
Venom/Spider-Man: Separation Anxiety	—N/a	—N/a	Yes	Yes	—N/a	—N/a

== Reception ==
Reception

Aggregate scores
Aggregator	Score
Metacritic	(PS5) 72/100 (NS) 69/100 (XSX) 75/100
OpenCritic	51% recommend (Note: Based on 36 reviews)

Review scores
Publication	Score
Game Informer	8/10
HobbyConsolas	68/100
Nintendo Life	7/10

Marvel MaXimum Collection received "mixed or average" reviews from critics, according to review aggregation website Metacritic, and 52% of critics recommended the game, according to OpenCritic.
