= Wonder Man =

Marvel Comics character

- Cover art of Avengers Two: Wonder Man and Beast—Marvel Tales #1 (January 2023) by Nick Bradshaw.

Publication information
- Publisher: Marvel Comics
- First appearance: The Avengers #9 (October 1964)
- Created by: Stan Lee (writer); Jack Kirby (artist); Don Heck (artist)

In-story information
- Alter ego: Simon Williams
- Species: Human mutate
- Team affiliations: Avengers; Williams Innovations; West Coast Avengers; Defenders; Force Works; S.H.I.E.L.D.; Lethal Legion; Masters of Evil; Legion of the Unliving; Revengers
- Notable aliases: Mr. Muscles; Hal Canutt
- Abilities: Superhuman strength, speed, agility, stamina and reflexes; Ionic-energy physiology; Enhanced vision and hearing; Electromagnetic manipulation; Ionic energy manipulation; Energy enhanced Strike; Virtual invulnerability; Self-sustenance; Power recycling; Size alteration; Healing factor; Shapeshifting; Teleportation; Immortality; Flight

Wonder Man (Simon Williams) is a character appearing in American comic books published by Marvel Comics. Created by writer Stan Lee and artists Don Heck and Jack Kirby, he first appeared in The Avengers #9 (October 1964). The character, who was initially introduced as a supervillain imbued with "ionic" energy, fought the Avengers, and, after a series of events, was reborn as a superhero, joining the team against which he originally fought.

Wonder Man has appeared in various media outside comics, including animated series and video games. The character made his live-action debut in the Disney+ original series Wonder Man (2026), set in the Marvel Cinematic Universe (MCU) and portrayed by Yahya Abdul-Mateen II.

== Publication history ==
Wonder Man debuted in the superhero-team title The Avengers #9 (cover-dated October 1964), and appeared to die in that issue. Four years later, The Avengers #58 (November 1968) revisited the events of #9, explaining that the Avengers had electronically saved Wonder Man's mind in a computer. Wonder Man was not seen again until The Avengers #102 (August 1972), where he made a cameo appearance in a comatose state. Wonder Man's body is revived by the villain Kang in The Avengers #131–132 (January–February 1975), and then again by the Black Talon in The Avengers #152 (October 1976), and finally by the Living Laser in The Avengers Annual #6 (1976). After this last encounter, Wonder Man finally recovers his faculties and joins the Avengers in a full-time capacity in The Avengers #160 (June 1977). Wonder Man and his fellow Avenger Beast were cast as friends, and lovers of nightlife, which would become a fan-favorite dynamic of The Avengers and continue to be used after the two characters left the series.

Marvel Comics' then-publisher Stan Lee said in 1978, "You know, years ago we brought out Wonder Man, and [DC Comics] sued us because they had Wonder Woman, and... I said okay, I'll discontinue Wonder Man. And all of a sudden they've got Power Girl [after Marvel had introduced Power Man]. Oh, boy. How unfair."

Wonder Man later appeared as a founding member of the spin-off West Coast Avengers first in a four-issue miniseries (September – December 1984), and continuing as one of the primary characters in the series' 102-issue run. After that team disbanded, he joined the team Force Works in a series that debuted with a July 1994 cover-date. After that team splintered, Wonder Man rejoined the Avengers in The Avengers (vol. 3) #4 (May 1998). After the collapse of the team in The Avengers #503 (December 2004), Wonder Man joined a new splinter group called the Mighty Avengers, co-starred in that team's series, which premiered with March 2007 cover-date.

Wonder Man starred in a self-titled graphic novel in 1986. He then starred in a 29-issue series, Wonder Man (September 1991 – February 1994), and then the three-issue miniseries Avengers Two: Wonder Man and the Beast (2000). In 2007, he starred in the five-issue miniseries Wonder Man: My Fair Super Hero.

Wonder Man appeared sporadically throughout the 2010–2013 Avengers series, but played an important role in the "End Times" storyline in issue #31 (December 2012) through its final issue #34 (January 2013).

Comic book writer Rick Remender revealed in an interview that Wonder Man would be a member of the Uncanny Avengers, starting with issue #5.

== Fictional character biography ==
Simon Williams is the son of rich industrialist Sanford Williams, owner of Williams Innovations. Simon inherits the munitions factory after his father's death, but the company's profits fall due to its biggest competitor Tony Stark and his company Stark Industries. On the advice of his brother Eric, Simon tries to embezzle funds from his company, but is caught and incarcerated. Simon, desperate and blaming Stark for his predicament, accepts an offer from Heinrich Zemo. Enchantress pays his bail, so Simon agrees to become a pawn in Zemo's plan to infiltrate the Avengers. As a result, Simon is transformed into an ion-powered superhuman. His powers are tested, and he is shown to have great superhuman strength and durability, even defeating the Executioner. Called Wonder Man by Zemo, he is sent to meet and join the Avengers, with instructions to betray them at a critical moment so that Zemo's Masters of Evil can destroy the Avengers. Zemo ensures Wonder Man's loyalty by advising him that as a result of the treatment his body now requires periodic doses of a serum to survive—a serum that only Zemo can provide. The Avengers are lured into a trap and captured. The plan fails when Wonder Man decides to save the Avengers and aid them against Zemo, apparently at the cost of his own life. Hank Pym records Wonder Man's brain patterns in the hope that he can eventually be revived. Unbeknownst to the Avengers, Wonder Man has entered a catatonic state rather than dying. Eric Williams becomes distraught over the apparent death of his sibling and, blaming the Avengers, assumes the identity of the Grim Reaper in an effort to destroy them.

Wonder Man remains in suspended animation for years, and it is during this period that Ultron, the evil robot creation of Hank Pym, steals his recorded brain patterns for use as a template for the synthezoid Vision. In addition, Wonder Man is briefly revived by Kang the Conqueror to battle the Avengers as part of his Legion of the Unliving, and later resurrected as a zombie by Black Talon and the Grim Reaper to attack the Avengers. Wonder Man is fully restored to life by the Living Laser and joins the Avengers in a full-time capacity. Wonder Man is later revealed to have become a being of ionic energy.

For several months after his resurrection, Wonder Man suffers from slight claustrophobia and a fear of dying in battle, as he did once before. He finally overcomes his fear of death during a battle with Korvac. Developing an interest in acting, Wonder Man stars in minor roles before moving to Hollywood, where fellow Avenger Hercules uses his contacts to establish Wonder Man's career. Wonder Man also works for a time as a stuntman, an ideal vocation since he is invulnerable to virtually all conventional weapons.

Wonder Man helps form the West Coast Avengers, and with his newfound confidence he becomes arrogant. He develops a serious rivalry with Iron Man, but sees the error of his ways after a brutal battle with the Abomination. Wonder Man eventually accepts Vision as his "brother", but there is a setback when Vision is dismantled and rebuilt as an emotionless machine by a global conglomerate. The Scarlet Witch—Vision's wife—asks Wonder Man to provide his brainwaves once again to rebuild the foundational personality matrix of the original Vision, but Wonder Man refuses, having feelings for her himself.

When Avengers West Coast disbands after a dispute, Wonder Man becomes a founding member of its successor group Force Works. However, he is disintegrated in an explosion during their first mission. Months later, the Scarlet Witch accidentally resurrects Wonder Man in an ionic form. Several months later, the Scarlet Witch is able to fully revive Wonder Man.

Wonder Man is blackmailed into working for S.H.I.E.L.D. during the Civil War storyline. Due to charges of misappropriation of funds in his non-profit organization, Wonder Man is pressured to work for the pro-registration side. In addition to capturing renegade vigilantes and criminals, Wonder Man creates televised messages to educate the public and yet-unregistered superhumans about the specifics of the Registration Act. Wonder Man later joins the Mighty Avengers.

Following the events of Secret Invasion, Norman Osborn creates a new team of Avengers, effectively forcing Wonder Man into retirement. He later appears on television, where he laments his tenure as an Avenger. He claims that his efforts were a waste of time, and that using violence to uphold justice has caused nothing but heartache and death. Wonder Man ends his speech by admitting that having Osborn in charge is exactly what the country deserves. Wonder Man joins the Lethal Legion, which is opposed to Osborn, to keep the group from hurting civilians.

During the Heroic Age storyline, Simon is approached by Captain America to join the new team of Avengers. Simon refuses stating that the Avengers have caused more problems than they have solved and implies as Captain America leaves that he will make sure his old allies realize the mistake they are making. Simon is also mentioned as having been in jail until Steve bailed him out. After learning that Captain America had disregarded his advice, Wonder Man attacks the new team causing some damage to their base before inexplicably disappearing. Thor and Iron Man later contact him to try to reason with him, but Simon refuses to listen to their arguments, stating that the dead heroes that have resulted from the Avengers working together should be a clear sign that the concept is doomed, departing as Thor and Iron Man try to argue that all heroes are aware of the risks when they begin. Iron Man notes that Simon is 'leaking' ionic energy, suggesting that his current mental condition may relate to his powers rather than being simply a matter of choice.

Wonder Man assembles the Revengers to stop the Avengers, believing they have done more harm than good. He blames them for Ultron's existence, the damage caused by Scarlet Witch and Hulk, the Civil War, and Osborn's Dark Avengers. His team defeats the New Avengers before moving on to attack Avengers Tower, stating that the tower will be destroyed unless the Avengers disband. The Avengers manage to defeat the Revengers, with Iron Man trapping Wonder Man in a prison designed to contain his energy. However, the Revengers' efforts have successfully spread doubt about the merits of the Avengers as a concept.

Wonder Man later escapes prison and visits Captain America, telling him that he regrets his past actions and is trying to redeem himself. Before he can accept help from the Avengers, Wonder Man is attacked by the Red Hulk. He manages to take him down and looks at Avengers Tower, claiming that he will "earn his way back".

At Wasp's urging, Simon joins the Avengers Unity Squad. During conversations with Wasp and Sunfire, he makes it clear has no intentions of fighting, and only wants to help use his PR skills to win over skeptical citizens. He and the Scarlet Witch rekindle their relationship. During a confrontation with the Celestial Executioner, Wonder Man allows Rogue to absorb him to give her the power to oppose the Celestial. Wonder Man's essence remains in Rogue after Scarlet Witch expels the other absorbed powers from her, leaving Rogue with Wonder Man's powers.

When the Avengers Unity Squad travels to Counter-Earth to find Quicksilver and Scarlet Witch, Rogue is captured by the High Evolutionary's right-hand man Master Scientist, who removes Wonder Man's consciousness from her body.

== Powers and abilities ==
Simon Williams gained his superhuman powers due to chemical and radiation treatments with "ionic" energy by Baron Zemo, giving him superhuman strength, speed, stamina, durability, agility, and reflexes. The process unexpectedly laced Pym Particles into the ion ray bombardment. While Zemo's initial aim was to use "ionic ray" supplemented treatments to make Wonder Man at least "the equal of any Avenger," his treatments surpassed his expectations and endowed Wonder Man with strength comparable to that of Thor. In Avengers: The Children's Crusade #3, Captain America described Wonder Man as having "Sentry-level" strength. Zemo's treatments also granted Wonder Man virtual invulnerability, immortality, enhanced physicality likened to greater stamina, agility, speed, and nearly instantaneous reflexes. Zemo outfitted Wonder Man with a rocket pack in his belt to achieve flight.

When the Scarlet Witch resurrected him during Kurt Busiek's tenure as head writer, Wonder Man was able to transform into a state of pure ionic energy at will and back again. Following his resurrection and metamorphosis, Wonder Man eventually learned he was capable of a great many feats he was not aware of beforehand. Due to his self-regenerating ionic energy, Simon has the ability to go without air, food, or water. His eyes also glow a bright red and he usually wears sunglasses to conceal the effect but has since realized he can normalize their appearance as well.

Before his "death" at the hands of the Kree, Wonder Man discovered new abilities. In his beginning years, Williams sometimes wore an ionic energy powered apparatus which allowed him simulated flight. Over the course of his career he would gain true flight without need of a thrust system, as well as energy projection. Other abilities begotten from manipulating his own ionic energies include emitting force or flame beams from his hands and eyes, alternating his physical shape in undiscovered ways, including changing his size (enabling him to grow taller than his adversary Goliath) and morphing his hand into a sickle or transforming into a more demonic semblance, and holding energy in his hand to increase the impact force of his physical blows. He can even give superpowers to non-powered individuals by imparting his ionic force unto them and can just as easily reabsorb it back into himself, which he may want to do as this somewhat weakens his superhuman abilities.

Since his resurrection, he has rarely used most of these powers but can still shift between human and energy states at will. It is later shown that Wonder Man continuously emits energy in his ionic form, allowing Iron Man to track him via his energy signature. In later appearances, he appears to have increased in strength and power, having also learned to teleport at will. Wonder Man has some limited effect on electromagnetic phenomena, allowing him to absorb radiological and ionic energy.

Williams is a skilled hand-to-hand combatant, having received training in unarmed combat from Captain America during his time with the Avengers. He holds a degree in electrical engineering and is an experienced actor and stuntman. Although his family's munitions company, Williams Innovations, collapsed financially, Williams later acquired substantial personal wealth through his film and television career.

== Reception ==
=== Accolades ===
- In 2012, IGN ranked Wonder Man 38th in their "The Top 50 Avengers" list.
- In 2015, Entertainment Weekly ranked Wonder-Man 78th in their "Let's rank every Avenger ever" list.
- In 2015, Gizmodo ranked Wonder Man 25th in their "Every Member Of The Avengers" list.
- In 2016, Screen Rant ranked Wonder Man 7th in their "20 Most Powerful Members Of The Avengers" list and 13th in their "15 Physically Strongest Superheroes" list.
- In 2017, Comic Book Resources (CBR) ranked Wonder Man 15th in their "The 15 Most Overpowered Avengers" list.
- In 2018, CBR ranked Wonder Man 12th in their "25 Most Powerful Avengers Ever" list.
- In 2021, CBR ranked Wonder Man 7th in their "Marvel: The 10 Strongest Male Avengers" list.
- In 2021, CBR ranked Wonder Man 7th in their "Marvel: 10 Characters Baron Zemo Created In The Comics" list.
- In 2022, Newsarama ranked Wonder Man 15th in their "Best Avengers members of all time" list.
- In 2022, Screen Rant ranked Wonder Man 4th in their "9 Strongest West Coast Avengers" list and included him in their "10 Most Powerful Avengers In Marvel Comics" list.
- In 2022, CBR ranked Wonder Man 9th in their "10 Most Iconic Avengers Who Aren't Iron Man, Captain America, Or Thor" list.

== Other versions ==
Many alternate universe versions of Wonder Man have appeared throughout the character's publication history.

- In Avengers Forever, Wonder Man is a member of a resistance against the Black Skull and goes on to join the Avengers.
- In Exiles, Wonder Man was transformed into a Hulk-like creature after being caught in the blast of a gamma bomb that Iron Man intended to use to kill the Hulk.
- In Guardians of the Galaxy, Wonder Man survives to the 31st century and joins the Guardians of the Galaxy, becoming known as Hollywood.
- In Heroes Reborn, Wonder Man is a member of the Enchantress's Lethal Legion.
- In the MC2 universe, Wonder Man is never revived after his initial death, with robotic copies of him being utilized instead.
- In the Ultimate Marvel universe, Wonder Man is a member of the West Coast Ultimates and a bodybuilder who acquired superhuman strength, but developed mental instability as a side effect.

== In other media ==
=== Television ===
Wonder Man as he appears in The Avengers: Earth's Mightiest Heroes.

- Wonder Man appears in The Avengers: United They Stand, voiced by Hamish McEwan. This version is a member of the Avengers.
- Wonder Man appears in The Avengers: Earth's Mightiest Heroes, voiced by Phil LaMarr. This version founded Williams Innovations before it was bought out by Tony Stark. Seeking revenge, Simon turns to his brother, the Grim Reaper, and A.I.M., who turn him into Wonder Man. He subsequently fights the Avengers before his body destabilizes, though the Enchantress restabilizes him and recruits him into the Masters of Evil. He battles the Avengers across several episodes before seemingly sacrificing himself to stop a Norn Stone's destruction. According to writer Christopher Yost, Wonder Man survived and would have reappeared had the series been renewed.
- Wonder Man appears in the M.O.D.O.K. episode "This Man... This Makeover!", voiced by Nathan Fillion. This version is an actor and self-proclaimed "pending Avenger".

=== Marvel Cinematic Universe ===
- Nathan Fillion was set to appear as Simon Williams on film posters set within the Marvel Cinematic Universe film Guardians of the Galaxy Vol. 2. Additionally, he released a picture from the film's set that depicted Williams as an actor portraying Arkon. Though his scenes were never filmed, director James Gunn acknowledged the character could return in future installments of the MCU franchise.
- Simon Williams appears in Wonder Man, portrayed by Yahya Abdul-Mateen II as an adult and Kameron J. Meadows as a child. This version is a Haitian-American aspiring Hollywood actor who strives to portray Wonder Man in the remake of an in-universe film of the same name, and has possessed his powers since childhood.

=== Video games ===
- Wonder Man appears in Captain America and the Avengers.
- Wonder Man appears as a boss in Marvel: Ultimate Alliance 2, voiced by Dave B. Mitchell. This version supports Iron Man in defending the Registration Acts.
- Wonder Man appears in Hawkeye's ending in Ultimate Marvel vs. Capcom 3 as a member of his West Coast Avengers.
- Wonder Man appears as a playable character in Marvel Super Hero Squad Online, voiced by Charlie Adler.
- Wonder Man appears as an unlockable character in Marvel Avengers Alliance.
- Wonder Man appears in Marvel Heroes.
- Wonder Man appears in Marvel Avengers Academy.
- Wonder Man appears in Lego Marvel Super Heroes 2.
- Wonder Man appears in Lego Marvel's Avengers as part of the "Classic Captain Marvel" DLC pack.

== Collected editions ==
Title	Material collected	Published date	ISBN
Avengers West Coast Epic Collection: How The West Was Won	Wonder Man (vol. 1) #1; West Coast Avengers (vol. 1) #1-4; Iron Man Annual #7; Avengers (vol. 1) #250; West Coast Avengers (vol. 2) #1-7; Vision and The Scarlet Witch #1-2	February 2021	978-1302928193
Avengers Epic Collection: Operation Galactic Storm	Wonder Man (vol. 2) #7-9; Avengers (vol. 1) #345-347; Avengers West Coast (vol. 2) #80-82; Quasar #32-34, Iron Man (vol. 1) #278-279; Thor (vol. 1) #445-446; Captain America (vol. 1) #401; material from Captain America (vol. 1) #398-400	May 2022	978-1302946869
Wonder Man: My Fair Super Hero	Wonder Man (vol. 3) #1-5	July 2007	978-0785119951
Wonder Man: The Early Years Omnibus	Avengers #9, 52, 131–132, 151–153, 157–160, 164–166, 181, 192–194, 197, 203, 207–208, 211, 239; Giant-Size Avengers #3; Marvel Team-Up #78, 136; Marvel Premiere #55; Marvel Two-in-One #78; Vision and the Scarlet Witch (1982) #3; Vision and the Scarlet Witch (1985) #2; West Coast Avengers (1984) #2; West Coast Avengers (1985) #1–2 and #25; Avengers West Coast #66–68; Wonder Man (1986) #1; material from: Avengers #201, Annual #6; Solo Avengers #13; Marvel Comics Presents #38–45; Marvel Super-Heroes#4; Avengers West Coast (1989) #65; Avengers Classic (2007) #9	12 Dec 2023	978-1302953522 (Arthur Adams cover); 978-1302953539 (Jack Kirby DM cover)
