= X-Men (1992 video game) =

1992 video game

- North American arcade flyer
- Developer: Konami
- Publisher: Konami
- Directors: C. Lee; Hideki Ohyama
- Producers: C. Lee; Masahiro Inoue
- Programmers: Hiroshi Matsuura; S. Yasuda
- Artists: K. Hattori; Captain OE; Yuji Asano; Mitsuhiro Nomi
- Composers: Seiichi Fukami; Yuji Takenouchi; Junya Nakano; Ayako Nishigaki
- Platform: Arcade
- Release: NA: March 1992; JP: June 1992
- Genre: Beat 'em up
- Modes: Single-player, multiplayer

X-Men (Note: Japanese: エックス・メン, Hepburn: Ekkusumen) is a 1992 beat 'em up video game developed and published by Konami for arcades. It is based on the Marvel Comics superhero team of the same name, while the in-game character designs are based on the 1989 television pilot, X-Men: Pryde of the X-Men. In the game, up to six players control the X-Men to defeat their archenemy, Magneto. The six-player version of the game utilizes two screens housed in a deluxe cabinet. It was one of the top five highest-grossing dedicated arcade games of 1992 in the United States, while the Amusement & Music Operators Association (AMOA) nominated it for the "most innovative new technology" award.

An arcade exclusive for many years, a home version of the game developed by Backbone Entertainment was released by Konami digitally on the PlayStation 3 and Xbox 360 in 2010, followed by mobile versions for iOS and Android devices, before being delisted in 2013. Other re-releases have included a 2021 home arcade machine from Arcade1Up, and as part of the Marvel MaXimum Collection in 2026.

== Plot ==
The player chooses one of six X-Men: Cyclops, Colossus, Wolverine, Storm, Nightcrawler or Dazzler. Their objective is to stop the villain Magneto from wreaking havoc on human civilization. They must fight through enemies from the comics such as an army of hundreds of Sentinels, mutant crocodiles, the Reavers, and supervillains such as Pyro, Blob, Wendigo, Nimrod, the White Queen, Juggernaut, the Living Monolith, and Mystique. Later, Magneto kidnaps Professor X and Kitty Pryde, prompting the heroes to go on a rescue mission. The heroes fight their way to Island M and ultimately to Magneto's base on Asteroid M, where the final battle takes place.

== Gameplay ==
The object of the game is to progress as far as possible while surviving attacks from Magneto and his minions. The character is controlled with a standard joystick, an attack button, a jump button, and a mutant power button. In addition to right and left, the character can move up and down the screen, which adds a three-dimensional element to the game. Every character is able to fight with punches, kicks, or other close combat attacks. Each character also has a unique mutant power which can be used to defeat multiple enemies on the screen at once. The use of a mutant power is very effective, but also costly since it causes a character to lose three health points. Normally, a character who drops below four health can no longer use any powers, but it is possible for them to obtain bonus powers, which can be stored like items. In the Japanese version, the power items are used up before the health, and there are also power-ups and health packs throughout the levels.

== Release ==
Depending on the machine, the maximum number of simultaneous players varies from two to six. The six-player version is particularly unusual because it has two contiguous screens (one screen in the usual place for an arcade game, the other in the cabinet below, reflected by a mirror one side of the screen) which created the effect of a single, "double-wide" screen set up, similar to Tecmo Bowl.

X-Men was re-released digitally to the PlayStation 3 and Xbox 360 by Backbone Entertainment with the original US and Japanese ROMs and was released on December 14 and 15, 2010 respectively by Konami. These versions feature drop-in local or online multiplayer for up to six players (only four local players possible on the XBLA version), as well as custom matchmaking and adjustable difficulty. Players can also choose between the US and Japanese versions of the game, the latter of which features power-ups and health packs. All of the voices were re-recorded by Bang Zoom! Entertainment due to licensing reasons, but the script retained the infamous lines from the original game, including "I am Magneto, master of magnet!" and "Welcome to die!". In the re-recorded script, only two voice actors were used for male and female characters (Kyle Hebert and Mela Lee, respectively). The game was delisted from both digital stores at the end of 2013.

Konami also released the game in the iTunes App Store to be played on iOS devices in 2011, as well as in the Android Market. The game remained largely identical to the original, with the addition of on-screen controls for smartphones. Three years later, the app was no longer available in the US iTunes App Store or the Android Market.

In 2021, Arcade1Up released a special Marvel themed cabinet that includes X-Men, Captain America and The Avengers, and Avengers in Galactic Storm.

The original arcade version was re-released in 2026 as part of the Marvel MaXimum Collection compilation, with support for online multiplayer using rollback netcode.

== Reception ==
In Japan, Game Machine listed X-Men as both the third most successful table arcade unit and seventh most successful upright arcade unit of August 1992. In the United States, X-Men was the top-grossing deluxe arcade cabinet on the RePlay charts from May to October 1992. It was one of the top five highest-grossing dedicated arcade games of 1992 in the United States, according to the Amusement & Music Operators Association (AMOA). At the 1992 AMOA Games Awards, it was nominated for the "most played video game (dedicated)" and "most innovative new technology" awards.

In Play Meter magazine, Jim Overman gave the arcade game a rating of 91% and a "gut feeling" score of 10 out of 10.

In 2004, X-Men was inducted into GameSpot's list of the greatest games of all time. In 2013, Arcade Sushi ranked X-Men 3rd on their "10 Best Retro Beat 'Em Ups". Nerdist.com included the game in its "Top Ten Most Iconic Marvel Video Games". In 2023, Time Extension included the game on their top 25 "Best Beat 'Em Ups of All Time" list.

IGN gave the HD port of the game a score of 7.5, saying "the game is incredibly simple and repetitive... And yet it works. It's simply a blast to play with friends". Many websites and reviewers such as Gouki.com stated that having unlimited continues without penalty for all modes has cheapened the classic experience, especially online play. Sinclair User magazine gave X-Men a score of 58/100, noting the arcade game's ability to have six players playing simultaneously, although stating "big game, big sprites, but unless you are a big fan of the Marvel comic, probably not big fun".

=== Colossus roar ===
An X-Men cabinet was donated to MAGFest, the Music and Gaming Festival, by attendee Charles Margolis in 2008. It was placed in a hub area and was extremely loud. In part due to the acoustics of the venue, the roar from Colossus' special move was heard frequently by attendees throughout the whole event. As a result, it has become a tradition at MAGFest for the audience to mimic the Colossus roar. Nobuo Uematsu led the crowd in a Colossus roar during a live performance there in 2012. The original cabinet is still present, with a memorial notice added after Margolis died from brain cancer in 2017.
