= Cotati (comics) =

Fictional alien race in Marvel Comics

Publication information
- Publisher: Marvel Comics
- First appearance: The Avengers #133 (March 1975)
- Created by: Steve Englehart and Sal Buscema

Characteristics
- Place of origin: Hala (former)

The Cotati (/koʊˈtɑːtiː/) are a fictional alien race appearing in American comic books published by Marvel Comics. They are a highly intelligent species of telepathic plants.

== Publication history ==
The Cotati first appeared in The Avengers #133 (March 1975), and were created by writer Steve Englehart and artist Sal Buscema.

== Fictional history ==
The Cotati are plant-like aliens who originate from the planet Hala in the Large Magellanic Cloud, the same planet as the Kree. They were once more humanoid in appearance, but eventually evolved to gain telepathic abilities while losing their mobility. As a result, the Cotati's legs, torso, and head merged into a single trunk-like body which is rooted to the ground and generally lacks facial features.

One million years prior, Hala was visited by the Skrull empire, who intended to annex the planet and offered its inhabitants their knowledge and technology in exchange for their loyalty and Hala's resources. To avoid any dissension regarding which of the two races would represent Hala to them, the Skrulls proposed a test of worthiness in which equal numbers of Kree and Cotati would be taken to different uninhabited worlds and left there with complete supplies for one year. At the end of that period, whichever group had done the most with themselves would be adjudged the most worthy. Both races agreed to these terms and the Skrulls transported 17 Cotati to a barren moon in an unspecified solar system. The Skrulls then transported 17 Kree to Earth's Moon and provided them with an artificial atmosphere and rudimentary technology. During this time, the Kree built a gargantuan city on Earth's Moon, which would later be known as the Blue Area of the Moon. The Skrulls who came to retrieve the Kree were extremely impressed and the Kree felt confident that they would be victorious. However, the Skrulls were more impressed by the Cotati terraforming their barren moon to be full of plant life. Enraged, the Kree killed most of the Cotati, then killed the Skrull delegation and took the Skrulls' technology.

Unbeknownst to the Kree, a new generation of Cotati were born from seeds dropped by the previous generation as they died. Centuries later, the Cotati made contact with a small number of Kree who were members of a secretive pacifist sect and formed an alliance with them. A century later, these pacifist Kree have become known as the Priests of Pama and keep the Cotati safe inside their temples.

The eldest of Earth's Cotati possessed and resurrected the Swordsman, becoming the father of the Celestial Messiah Sequoia.

During the Empyre storyline, the eldest of Earth's Cotati request the Avengers' help to avoid another Cotati massacre by the Kree/Skrull alliance. However, it is later revealed that the Cotati have abandoned their peaceful nature and aim to kill all animal life. This causes the Avengers and the Fantastic Four to work with the Kree and Skrulls to fight them. R'Kill intends to use the Pyre to annihilate the Cotati, which would cause the Sun to annihilate the Solar System. After R'Kill's plan is stopped, Franklin Richards brings the Cotati to an uninhabited planet where they can live safely.

== Known Cotati ==
- Ru'tuh-Baga – A Cotati who operated in Genosha.
- Qqoi – A Cotati science minister who worked for Ru'tuh-Baga.
- Shi Qaanth – A Cotati spellcaster who fought Captain America in Arlington and later attacked Mexico City.
- Sequoia – Also known as "Quoi", Sequoia is the Celestial Messiah and the child of Mantis and an Elder Cotati who possessed Swordsman's corpse.
- Swordsman – After being killed by Kang the Conqueror, the Swordsman was possessed by a Cotati. He is later killed by Black Panther.
- Trrunk – A Cotati priest at the Temple of Pama. He was killed by Va-Sohn.
- Veltri – A Cotati spellcaster who operated in the Savage Land.

== In other media ==
The Cotati are alluded to in the Marvel Cinematic Universe films Guardians of the Galaxy and Avengers: Infinity War.
