= Captain America and The Avengers =

1991 video game

Captain America and the Avengers
- Arcade flyer
- Developer: Data East (Note: SNES, Game Gear, and Game Boy versions developed by Realtime Associates; Genesis/Mega Drive version developed by ISCO and Opera House.)
- Publishers: Data East; Super NES, Game Gear, Game Boy; Mindscape
- Producers: Koji Jinbo; Iwao Horita
- Designer: Hidenobu Ito
- Programmers: Tac H.; Hiroshi Ōnuki; K. Miyazawa
- Artists: Masanori Tokoro; Sonomi Kiyota; Wataru Oguri; Atsushi Takahashi
- Composers: Tatsuya Kiuchi; Tomoyoshi Sato
- Platforms: Arcade, NES, Genesis/Mega Drive, Super NES, Game Gear, Game Boy
- Release: October 1991: Arcade October 1991 NES; NA: December 1991; PAL: 1991 Genesis/Mega Drive; NA: December 1992; EU: April 1993 Super NES; NA: September 1993; PAL: 1993 Game Gear 1993 Game Boy; NA: February 1994
- Genre: Beat 'em up
- Modes: Single-player, multiplayer

Captain America and the Avengers (Note: Japanese: キャプテンアメリカアンドジアベンジャーズ, Hepburn: Kyaputen Amerika ando ji Abenjāzu) is a 1991 beat 'em up video game developed and published by Data East for arcades. It features the Avengers team of Marvel Comics characters in a side-scrolling brawling and shooting adventure to defeat the evil Red Skull. The game received ports for the Sega Genesis/Mega Drive, Super Nintendo Entertainment System, Game Boy and Game Gear. A different Data East game was released for the Nintendo Entertainment System.

== Gameplay ==
The Red Skull has assembled an army of supervillains and other henchmen in a plot to take over the world. Along with battling generic enemies, players also face Klaw, the Living Laser, Whirlwind, a Sentinel, Wizard, the Grim Reaper, the Mandarin, Juggernaut, Ultron, The Controller, the assassin Crossbones and finally the Red Skull himself.

Players can choose to play as one of four members of the Avengers: Captain America, Iron Man, Hawkeye, and Vision. Each character can fight hand-to-hand, throw select items when on the ground, and use a ranged special attack, either a projectile weapon (Captain America's shield and Hawkeye's arrows) or an energy beam (Iron Man and Vision), known as that character's "Avenger Attack". During a jump, Captain America and Hawkeye can attack with a flying kick, while Iron Man and Vision instead attack by firing their energy beams at a 45-degree angle. Other Avengers, including the Wasp, Quicksilver, Wonder Man, and Namor the Sub-Mariner, may appear to help the players' characters.

Most game levels feature side-scrolling fighting, with free movement as in traditional arcade brawlers. Occasionally, players take flight for side-scrolling flying and shooting sequences; Iron Man and Vision fly on their own, while Captain America and Hawkeye use flying machines.

== Versions ==
Arcade screenshot

The original arcade game was sold in two forms. One version allowed four players to play simultaneously, with each player position controlling a specific character. An alternate version featured two-player gameplay, with players able to select from any of the available four characters.

== Ports and related releases ==
Data East released a home version of the game in North America for the Sega Genesis co-developed with ISCO and Opera House. This version was published in Europe by Sega for the Mega Drive. The game was later licensed to Mindscape, who released its own ports of the arcade game for the Super NES, Game Boy, and Game Gear. The versions published by Mindscape in 1993 were developed by Realtime Associates.

Data East also released a different NES game with the same title. The NES version is a side-scrolling action platform game. The only playable characters in this version are Captain America and Hawkeye; their mission is to save the Vision and Iron Man from Mandarin, then defeat the Red Skull. As with the Genesis/Mega Drive port, the NES game was developed in Japan but not released there.

Data East's third and final entry in their Captain America and The Avengers licensed video games was the 1995 Avengers in Galactic Storm, which was an arcade exclusive fighting game that became the first to feature assist characters and duplex desperation moves.

In 2021, Arcade1Up released the game in a special Marvel-themed cabinet that also featured Avengers in Galactic Storm and X-Men.

The arcade, Genesis, and NES versions were re-released as part of the compilation Marvel MaXimum Collection in 2026.

== Reception ==
Reception

Review scores
Publication	Score
AllGame	3.5/5 (ARC); 3.5/5 (NES)
Electronic Gaming Monthly	32/50 (Game Gear)
Game Players	6/10 (SNES)
GamePro	11.5/20 (Game Gear)

Award
Publication	Award
Sinclair User	Games Most Likely To Save The Universe

=== Arcade ===
In the United States, it topped the RePlay arcade earnings chart for upright arcade cabinets in November 1991. In Japan, it was the fourth most successful table arcade unit of December 1991, according to Game Machine.

The November 1991 issue of Sinclair User gave it the shared award for "Games Most Likely To Save The Universe" as one of the best superhero games, along with Spider-Man: The Video Game and Captain Commando.

=== Game Gear ===
In reviewing the Game Gear version, GamePro called the game "a forgettable scroller" with mediocre animation and sound. Electronic Gaming Monthly said it "fares well on this Game Gear version, even without the Two-player Simultaneous Play Option". [sic]

=== SNES ===
In 2018, Complex ranked the SNES version 85th on their "The Best Super Nintendo Games of All Time".
