= Metal Master (comics) =

Fictional character in the Marvel Universe

- Metal Master as seen in The Incredible Hulk #6.

Publication information
- Publisher: Marvel Comics
- First appearance: Molyb: The Incredible Hulk #6 (March 1963); Molyn: The Avengers #676 (January 2018)
- Created by: Stan Lee; Steve Ditko

In-story information
- Alter ego: Molyb; Molyn
- Species: Astran
- Place of origin: Astra
- Abilities: Metal manipulation; Spacecraft aptitude

Metal Master is the name of two fictional characters appearing in American comic books published by Marvel Comics.

== Publication history ==
The first Metal Master first appeared in The Incredible Hulk #6 (March 1963), and was created by Stan Lee and Steve Ditko. The character subsequently appears in Rampaging Hulk #3 (June 1977), ROM #30 (May 1982), and Maximum Security #2 (December 2000). Metal Master received an entry in the Official Handbook of the Marvel Universe A-Z #7 (2009).

The second Metal Master first appeared in Avengers #676 and was created by Mark Waid, Al Ewing, Jim Zub, and Pepe Larraz.

== Fictional character biography ==
=== Molyb ===
Metal Master is an Astran, a humanoid alien with the ability to manipulate metal. He was banished from his home planet of Astra for trying to conquer it. After arriving on Earth, the Metal Master attacks Gamma Base and defeats the Hulk when he refuses to join him. The Hulk returns with a plastic weapon; the Metal Master's powers cannot affect the gun, causing him to be caught off guard and easily defeated.

The Metal Master later returns to Earth, seeking large amounts of metals that the Astrans thrive on. There, he encounters the Spaceknight Rom and attempts to control his metal armor. Rom resists him, and the Metal Master is nearly driven mad by the thought of a metal that he cannot control.

Sometime later, the Conclave of Seven Planets sentences Metal Master to a deep space torture prison. He becomes acquaintances with his fellow cellmates Black Bolt, Absorbing Man, Blinky, and Raava. He and his fellow inmates escape after Absorbing Man seemingly sacrifices himself to help Black Bolt kill the torture prison's Jailer. After escaping, Metal Master decides to atone for his past crimes.

=== Molyn ===
A new incarnation of the Metal Master named Molyn, nicknamed the "All-New Metal Master", appears in the "No Surrender" arc as a member of the Grandmaster's Lethal Legion.

== Powers and abilities ==
The Metal Master can manipulate virtually all types of metal, enabling him to alter its shape and density and bring it to life. However, he is unable to control Plandarium, the metal alloy from which Spaceknight armor is made. He has additionally built starships with intermediate hyperdrive functions, but otherwise at Earth's technological level.

== In other media ==
The Molyb incarnation of Metal Master appears in The Marvel Super Heroes, voiced by Paul Kligman.
