= Legion of the Unliving =

Comic book superhero groups

- The first Legion of the Unliving appears on the cover of Avengers #131 (Jan. 1975), art by Sal Buscema.

Publication information
- Publisher: Marvel Comics
- First appearance: Avengers #131 (Jan. 1975)
- Created by: Steve Englehart; Sal Buscema

In-story information
- Base(s): Various
- Member(s): List of Legion of the Unliving members

The Legion of the Unliving are six groups of fictional characters appearing in American comic books published by Marvel Comics.

== Publication history ==
The original five versions first appear in Avengers #131 (Jan. 1975); Avengers Annual #16 (Dec. 1987); Avengers West Coast #61 (Aug. 1990); Avengers #353 (Sep. 1992) and Avengers vol. 3, #10 (Nov. 1998) respectively. The groups were created by Steve Englehart and Sal Buscema; Tom DeFalco and various artists; Roy Thomas and Daniel Bulanadi; Len Kaminski and Chris Eliopoulos and Kurt Busiek and George Pérez. A new version of the Legion was created by Jason Aaron in Avengers vol. 8, #12 (Jan. 2019).

== Fictional character biography ==
=== First Legion of the Unliving ===
The original Legion appears during the Celestial Madonna storyline in the titles Avengers and Giant-Size Avengers, having been summoned from time by the villain Kang the Conqueror (at the suggestion of his future self Immortus) to kill the superhero team. As the name implies, the members of the Legion were all characters established as being deceased in Marvel continuity, being pulled from time a moment before their deaths. Although partially successful in their mission (the original Human Torch kills Iron Man and the Vision is wounded), the Legion frees itself from Kang's control and aid the Avengers. Kang flees when confronted by the Thunder God Thor, with Immortus reviving Iron Man and healing the Vision and returning the Legion back to their respective eras. Only the Human Torch android is allowed to remain as it is revealed that the character is in fact the Vision, years before being modified by the robot Ultron.

=== Second Legion of the Unliving ===
The second version of the Legion is featured in an Avengers annual, in which the Elder of the Universe the Grandmaster, usurps the power of the entity Death. Intending to destroy the universe—via six bombs—and recreate it with his fellow Elders, the Grandmaster decides to eliminate opponents the Avengers (including the West Coast Avengers) by having fellow Elder the Collector take the heroes (and ally the Silver Surfer) to the Realm of Death to battle the Legion of the Unliving. A battle to the death follows, and when Thor observes fellow Asgardian the Executioner act dishonourably he realizes the Legion are in fact only copies of the original beings, minus their personalities. Almost all the Avengers are killed stopping the Legion and defusing the bombs, with only Captain America and Hawkeye surviving. The Grandmaster then proposes another competition and adds the fallen heroes to the Legion, until tricked by Hawkeye in a game of chance. Losing the game disorients the Grandmaster and Death is released, with the entity banishing all the Elders from its realm, restoring all heroes to life and then returning them to Earth.

=== Third Legion of the Unliving ===
The third version of the Legion appears in the title Avengers West Coast, and is created by Immortus. Seeking to use the Scarlet Witch as a nexus point from which to control all of time, Immortus summons the Legion to delay the pursuing Avengers, although they are almost totally defeated by the heroes. Immortus himself is judged by the entities the Time Keepers and forced to become the nexus himself.

=== Fourth Legion of the Unliving ===
A fourth version appears in the title Avengers, with the former villains' spirits summoned and placed in the bodies of dead civilians—effectively zombies—by Avengers foe the Grim Reaper (empowered by a demon called Lloigoroth) who mistakenly believes the Avengers had murdered him. When the Grim Reaper is confronted by the Vision and forced to accept that he actually committed suicide, the Legion rebel. Grim Reaper panics and is attacked and apparently consumed by Lloigoroth, with the Legion's spirits departing the corpses.

=== Fifth Legion of the Unliving ===
The fifth version of the Legion appears in the third volume of the title Avengers, with the returning spirit of the Grim Reaper corrupting his brother Wonder Man and using him to summon former Avengers who died in battle. The Scarlet Witch, however, uses her love for Wonder Man to free him from the limbo-like state his ionic form was in, thereby freeing him from the Reaper's control. Wonder Man is then able to restore the Reaper to a physical form. The humbled villain relinquishes control of the Legion, and the dead heroes speak to their comrades a final time before dying once again.

=== Sixth Legion of the Unliving ===
A new Legion is created by Xarus' Shadow Colonel alias in his vampire civil war, whose membership includes vampires like Carpathian, Baroness Blood, Rat Bomber, Snowsnake, and his hellhound Sarge. In addition, Xarus obtains a fragment of Man-Thing and uses it to grow a smaller version of him called Boy-Thing. Xarus is beheaded by Blade, who takes in Boy-Thing; while Sarge is defeated by Thor's hellhound Thori. The Legion of the Unliving flees to Chernobyl, where Dracula had set up his territory.

=== Seventh Legion of the Unliving ===
When working for Anubis, Randall Spector leads a new incarnation of the Legion of the Unliving as Jackal Knight. This line-up consists of Black Spectre, Chainsaw, Master Sniper, Midnight, Plasma, and Taurus, who are described to be victims of Moon Knight and were revived by the sorcery of Anubis. They target the soul of Khalil Nasser, who is the current host of Osiris. When the ghosts of Baron Blood (Kenneth Creighton), Cobra (James Landers), Crime-Master's Jack O'Lantern, Death Adder, Grim Reaper, and Kraven the Hunter invade Earth, Nasser sacrifices himself to free Osiris, who helps end Jackal Knight's plans. It is unknown what happened to the Legion of the Unliving afterwards.
