= Black Talon (comics) =

Marvel Comics fictional character

The Black Talon is the name of a number of supervillains appearing in American comic books published by Marvel Comics.

== Publication history ==
Pascal Horta first appeared in Captain America Comics #9 (1941) and was created by Otto Binder and Jack Kirby.

Desmond Drew first appeared in Strange Tales #173 (April 1974) and was created by Gene Colan and Len Wein.

The successor to Drew named Samuel David Barone wore the same costume as the original and was an ally of the Grim Reaper, operating in the New Orleans area. He first appeared in The Avengers #152 (Oct. 1976), created by Gerry Conway and John Buscema.

== Fictional character biography ==
=== Black Talon (Pascal Horta) ===
The first Black Talon was Pascal Horta, a painter who lost his hand in an auto accident. Undergoing experimental surgery, he was given the hand of an African-American serial killer, "Strangler Burns", who was put to death. The serial killer blood in his new hand overcame Horta's peaceful nature and drove him to commit murders.

=== Black Talon (Desmond Drew) ===
Black Talon

Publication information
- Publisher: Marvel Comics
- First appearance: Strange Tales #173 (April 1974)
- Created by: Gene Colan (artist); Len Wein (writer)

In-story information
- Alter ego: Desmond Drew
- Species: Human
- Partnerships: Mama Limbo
- Abilities: Voodoo magic manipulation that allows him to create and control zombies

The second Black Talon is a voodoo priest who can create and control zombies. He wears a costume which resembles a chicken, and has an upside-down cross painted on his chest. He was a millionaire and voodoo witch doctor, and posed as a "living loa" to carry out the plans of his mother, Mama Limbo. He battled and became an enemy of Brother Voodoo. He was later exposed as an impostor, and was beaten to death by his own cultists.

=== Black Talon (Samuel Barone) ===
Black Talon
- The third Black Talon (left) as depicted on the cover of She-Hulk #35 (January 1992). Art by John Byrne.

Publication information
- Publisher: Marvel Comics
- First appearance: The Avengers #152 (October 1976)
- Created by: Gerry Conway (writer); John Buscema (artist)

In-story information
- Alter ego: Samuel David Barone
- Species: Human
- Team affiliations: Lethal Legion; X-Humed; Masters of Evil
- Partnerships: Grim Reaper
- Abilities: Voodoo magic manipulation that allows him to create and control zombies

The third Black Talon is a professional criminal and cult leader. He resurrects Wonder Man as a zombie at the behest of the Grim Reaper and sends him to attack the Avengers. Black Talon battles the Avengers himself, and is defeated by the Scarlet Witch. He then joins the second Lethal Legion. With the Grim Reaper and Nekra, he battles the Vision and Scarlet Witch. Nekra learns some of Black Talon's voodoo magic, which she uses to resurrect the Grim Reaper after he is killed in battle.

When battling She-Hulk, Black Talon resurrects the mutants Changeling, Scaleface, Living Diamond, and Harry Leland, forming a group known as the X-Humed. He is unable to control all of them at once and Changeling breaks free of Black Talon's control long enough for She-Hulk to defeat him and the X-Humed.

Black Talon returns in Marvel Zombies 4, having retired from supervillainy and become a cocaine dealer. He later attacks Times Square, but is killed by the Punisher.

Black Talon later appears alive and joins the Shadow Council's incarnation of the Masters of Evil.

Black Talon later resurfaced in a small strip mall in New York where, during a Halloween walk-a-thon, he turns a group of dead senior citizens into zombies. He encounters Deadpool, who laughs when he sees an old photo of him due to the chicken head of his costume, which Talon removed. It is later revealed that Black Talon's attack on the mall was part of a plan to help his grandmother win the walk-a-thon, though his grandmother only wanted to win the race. During the battle, Black Talon's grandmother manages to convince him to stop, forcing him to retreat.

== Powers and abilities ==
Both Desmond Drew and Samuel Barone are voodoo cult leaders who gain their powers from the manipulation of the forces of voodoo magic. Each can create and control zombies of their creation, either vocally or telepathically. However, the Black Talon cannot communicate with his zombies telepathically when they are not in his immediate vicinity.

Each Black Talon's costume sports the trappings of various voodoo rituals, with razor-sharp taloned gloves and boots, and a ceremonial dagger.
