= Whirlwind (comics) =

Marvel Comics fictional character

- Whirlwind as he appears on the cover of Avengers #139 (Sep. 1975). Art by John Romita Sr.

Publication information
- Publisher: Marvel Comics
- First appearance: Tales to Astonish #50 (December 1963)
- Created by: Stan Lee (writer); Jack Kirby (artist)

In-story information
- Alter ego: David "Dave" Cannon
- Species: Human mutant
- Team affiliations: Assassins Guild; Defenders; Lethal Legion; Masters of Evil; Thunderbolts
- Notable aliases: Human Top
- Abilities: Ability to spin at subsonic speeds granting: Superhuman speed, agility, balance and reflexes Force field generation Tornado generation Wind jet stream Flight

Whirlwind (David Cannon) is a character appearing in American comic books published by Marvel Comics. Created by writer Stan Lee and artist Jack Kirby, the character first appeared in Tales To Astonish #50 (December 1963). David Cannon belongs to the subspecies of humans called mutants, who are born with superhuman abilities. He is a recurring antagonist of the superheroes Hank Pym and Janet van Dyne. He has also been known as the Human Top at various points in his history.

== Publication history ==
David Cannon / Whirlwind debuted in Tales To Astonish #50 (December 1963), created by writer Stan Lee and artist Jack Kirby. He appeared in the 2007 Invincible Iron Man series. He appeared in the 2021 Sinister War series. He appeared in the 2022 X-Men Annual one-shot. He appeared in the 2023 Wasp series. He appeared in the 2023 Avengers Inc. series.

== Fictional character biography ==
David Cannon was born in Kansas City, Missouri. After discovering his mutant power to move at great speeds at an early age, he turns to a life of crime. This eventually brings Cannon, using his first alias as the Human Top and pursuing his career as a jewel thief, into conflict with Giant-Man and the Wasp on several occasions. Defeated each time, Cannon then redesigns his costume and adopts the alias of "Whirlwind". He also adopts the identity of Charles Matthews, chauffeur of Janet van Dyne. Whirlwind joined the supervillain group the second Masters of Evil, and participated in a plot to destroy the Avengers. He joined the third Masters of Evil, and participated in a Vermont battle against the Avengers. With Batroc the Leaper and Porcupine, he went on a mission for the Red Skull.

Cannon continues with the Charles Matthews identity, first with the intent of robbing van Dyne, later with the intent of hitting on van Dyne. In the role of Charles, he pines for Janet, making advances when Hank Pym is presumed to be dead during the run in Marvel Feature. Charles is later fired for trying to embezzle Janet's money, and Hank finally discovers that Charles is Whirlwind later on in the series, forcing Whirlwind to abandon the identity.

Whirlwind is then employed by master villain Count Nefaria and joins the Lethal Legion. Nefaria temporarily amplifies the abilities of Whirlwind and super-powered team-mates Power Man and the Living Laser before sending them against the Avengers. The effect, however, is temporary and their combined abilities are drained by Nefaria subsequently defeated by the Avengers. Whirlwind joined the third Masters of Evil in a plan to destroy the Avengers, but caused their defeat by attacking prematurely. Whirlwind later upgrades his costume when joining a new version of the Masters of Evil formed by Baron Zemo. Whirlwind partnered with the Trapster, obtained a new battle armor and weapons from Tinkerer, and battled Captain America in an attempt to bolster his criminal reputation. He then partnered with Tiger Shark, traveled to San Francisco to steal an experimental "psycho-circuit", and battled the West Coast Avengers. Whirlwind also shows signs of an obsession with the Wasp, as he forces prostitutes to dress in the Wasp's past costumes and then assaults them.

Whirlwind and the Trapster end up fighting, due to a bounty placed on the former by the up-and-coming criminal mastermind Ricadonna. Trapster glues Whirlwind to the floor just at the start of his spin. He continues twirling, breaking many of his bones, including his spine. He makes a full recovery and is forced to join Baron Zemo's team of Thunderbolts. After leaving them, he gathered a group of villains together and tried to extort money from the Thunderbolts' new director Norman Osborn, but was beaten by Osborn and is now forced to work secretly. In Dark Reign: Zodiac, Cannon is shown as a mole for Zodiac, working as Norman's chauffeur.

During the "Avengers: Standoff!" storyline, Whirlwind appears as an inmate of Pleasant Hill, a gated community established by S.H.I.E.L.D. Using Kobik, S.H.I.E.L.D. transformed Whirlwind into a teenager named Scotty. When Baron Zemo and Fixer restore the inmates' memories, Whirlwind goes on a rampage with Absorbing Man. When the Hood and Titania arrive to retrieve Absorbing Man, Whirlwind and Absorbing Man side with the Hood's Illuminati.

In a lead-up to the "Sins Rising" arc, Count Nefaria forms a new version of the Lethal Legion with Grey Gargoyle, Living Laser, and Whirlwind in a plot to target the Catalyst. The Lethal Legion attack Empire State University and confront Spider-Man, but are attacked by Sin-Eater. Sin-Eater uses his gun to steal the powers and sins of the Lethal Legion's members. Following Sin-Eater's suicide, the Lethal Legion's members regain their sins.

Whirlwind is used by W.H.I.S.P.E.R. to attack Janet van Dyne and Nadia van Dyne. Upon his defeat by them, Whirlwind offers to name the person who hired him to Janet in exchange for protection. However, he is shot and killed by an unidentified intruder.

Whirlwind is resurrected after being possessed by the artificial intelligence Victor Shade. It is later revealed that Shade was created by an older man who claims to be Hank Pym and previously arranged for the deaths of Whirlwind and other inmates. Shade's body is hijacked by Ultron-12, who knocks out Pym and takes control of the Lethal Legion. Ultron-12 later abandons Whirlwind's body and forms a body for himself using nanomachines.

== Powers and abilities ==
David Cannon is a mutant with the ability to rapidly spin his body. This enables him to fly and generate powerful gusts of wind, and gives him superhuman speed and agility. He can create powerful air blasts which enable him to punch through brick walls, or aerial force screens capable of stopping firearm slugs. His physiology is adapted to resist the rotatory inertia created by his powers, which incidentally also bestows him with heightened resistance to physical damage.

Whirlwind habitually wears an aerodynamic costume of his own design to improve his spinning abilities. He was later outfitted by the Tinkerer with a chainmail suit for additional protection, a pair of wrist-mounted steel buzzsaw blades which, combined with his power, enable him to cut cleanly through steel plating with one swipe, and saw-like throwing blades.

== Reception ==
Adam Holmes of CinemaBlend included David Cannon in their "5 Marvel Villains We'd Love To See In Ant-Man And The Wasp" list.

== Other versions ==
=== Heroes Reborn ===
An alternate universe version of Whirlwind appears in Heroes Reborn.

=== JLA/Avengers ===
Whirlwind appears in JLA/Avengers #4 as a brainwashed minion of Krona.

=== Old Man Logan ===
An alternate universe version of Whirlwind appears in Old Man Logan.

== In other media ==
=== Television ===
- Whirlwind appears in Iron Man, initially voiced by James Avery and subsequently by Dorian Harewood. This version is a servant of the Mandarin.
- Whirlwind appears in The Avengers: United They Stand episode "Command Decision", voiced by Peter Windrem. This version is a member of Baron Helmut Zemo's Masters of Evil.
- Whirlwind makes a non-speaking cameo appearance in The Super Hero Squad Show episode "A Brat Walks Among Us!" as a member of Doctor Doom's Lethal Legion.
- Whirlwind appears in The Avengers: Earth's Mightiest Heroes, voiced by Troy Baker. In the episode "Assault on 42", Whirlwind is killed while helping the Avengers fight Annihilus.
- Whirlwind appears in Ultimate Spider-Man, voiced by Tom Kenny. This version is among the first villains Spider-Man faced and is on S.H.I.E.L.D.'s most wanted list.
- Whirlwind appears in the Avengers Assemble episode "Spectrums", voiced again by Tom Kenny.
- Whirlwind appears in the Spider-Man episode "The Cellar" as an inmate of the eponymous prison.
- Whirlwind appears in Marvel Disk Wars: The Avengers, voiced by Keith Silverstein in the English dub.
- Whirlwind appears in the Ant-Man episode "Not a Date".
- Whirlwind appears in the M.O.D.O.K. episode "Days of Future M.O.D.O.K.s", voiced by Kevin Michael Richardson.

=== Video games ===
- Whirlwind appears as the first boss of Captain America and The Avengers.
- Whirlwind appears in Marvel: Ultimate Alliance 2, voiced by Adam Jennings. This version is among several supervillains controlled with nanites and forced to help either the Anti-Registration or the Pro-Registration side.
- Whirlwind appears in Marvel: Avengers Alliance 2.
- Whirlwind appears as a boss and playable character in Lego Marvel's Avengers via the "Masters of Evil" DLC pack. This version is a member of the eponymous group.
