= Lethal Legion =

Marvel Comics supervillain team

The Lethal Legion is the name of seven teams of fictional characters appearing in American comic books published by Marvel Comics.

== Publication history ==
The first version of the Lethal Legion appeared in The Avengers #78 (July 1970).

The second version of the Lethal Legion appeared in The Avengers #164 (October 1977)

The third version in The West Coast Avengers (vol. 2) #1 (October 1985).

The fourth version appeared in Marvel Age Annual #1 (1985).

The fifth version of the Lethal Legion appeared in Avengers West Coast #98 (September 1993)

The sixth version of the Lethal Legion appeared in the limited series Dark Reign: Lethal Legion #1 (August 2009).

== Fictional history ==
=== Grim Reaper's Lethal Legion ===
Lethal Legion
- The original Lethal Legion on the cover of The Avengers #79 (August 1970); Art by John Buscema.

Publication information
- Publisher: Marvel Comics
- First appearance: The Avengers #78 (July 1970)
- Created by: Roy Thomas (Writer); John Buscema (Artist); Tom Palmer

In-story information
- Base(s): Various
- Member(s): Grim Reaper; Living Laser; Man-Ape; Power Man; Swordsman

The original Lethal Legion is formed by the villain Grim Reaper (the brother of Avenger Wonder Man) and consists of Man-Ape, Power Man, Living Laser, and Swordsman. Man-Ape attacks Captain America, but is beaten back by the Avengers. However, he captures Black Panther's girlfriend Monica, binding her hand and foot with metal clamps. Black Panther is lured into a trap by Man-Ape, and despite getting past him he is knocked out by an exploding dummy of Monica. Black Panther is chained and with Man-Ape, he meets the other members of the Lethal Legion.

Grim Reaper dispatches the Lethal Legion members to different locations to confront the Avengers. Power Man and Swordsman are sent to the water main below Avengers Mansion, Living Laser and Man-Ape are sent to the nearby power station, and Grim Reaper seemingly departs to Greenwich Village. Black Panther escapes and contacts the Avengers to warn them about the Lethal Legion's plot. Grim Reaper returns and uses the knockout gas in his scythe to knock out Black Panther. While the other members of the Lethal Legion defeat the Avengers, Vision defeats Power Man, who had been sent to capture him at Avengers Mansion. He disguises himself as Power Man and Power Man as him and takes him to the base. The Lethal Legion places the Avengers in an hourglass container and then fills it with deadly gas. When "Power Man" arrives with "Vision", Grim Reaper detects the brain patterns of Wonder Man and shattered the hourglass to save Vision's life, only to realize that the vision in the hourglass is actually Power Man. At that point, Vision aids the Avengers in defeating the Lethal Legion, who are handed over to the authorities.

=== Count Nefaria's Lethal Legion ===
Lethal Legion

Publication information
- Publisher: Marvel Comics
- First appearance: The Avengers #164 (October 1977)
- Created by: Jim Shooter; John Byrne

In-story information
- Base(s): Various
- Member(s): Count Nefaria; Living Laser; Power Man; Whirlwind

A second version, formed by European villain Count Nefaria reappears in the title, composed of Living Laser, Whirlwind and Power Man. He magnifies their powers, but is revealed to be a manipulative ploy to steal their magnified powers in a failed bid to destroy the Avengers. The depowered villains are sent to prison.

=== Grim Reaper's second Lethal Legion ===
Lethal Legion

Publication information
- Publisher: Marvel Comics
- First appearance: West Coast Avengers (vol. 2) #1 (October 1985).
- Created by: Steve Englehart; Al Milgrom

In-story information
- Base(s): Various
- Member(s): Black Talon (Barone); Goliath; Grim Reaper; Man-Ape; Nekra; Ultron-12

The Grim Reaper returns in the title West Coast Avengers, leading a third version against the superhero team consisting of Black Talon (Barone), Goliath, Man-Ape, Nekra, and Ultron-12. Grim Reaper has Ultron lead a squadron of robots to spring Goliath from a compound that he is imprisoned in. When Goliath is freed by Man-Ape, the three villains work together to take out the Avengers, with Ultron-12 stating that he has his own plans for Wonder Man. The three villains escape with an unconscious Hank Pym and Wonder Man. Hawkeye figures out that Grim Reaper is behind this.

The three villains meet up with Grim Reaper. Internal squabbling and personal agendas overtake the villains and they are defeated and scattered.

=== Porcupine's Lethal Legion ===
Lethal Legion

Publication information
- Publisher: Marvel Comics
- First appearance: Marvel Age #1 (1985)
- Created by: Kurt Busiek; James Fry; Keith Williams

In-story information
- Base(s): Various
- Member(s): Attuma; Batroc the Leaper; Black Tiger; Bulldozer; Gorilla-Man (Nagan); Kurr'fri; Piledriver; Porcupine; Sabretooth; Thundra; Trapster; Unicorn; Whirlwind; Wrecker

A fourth version appears in the title Marvel Age, led by Porcupine and consisted of Attuma, Batroc the Leaper, Bulldozer, Black Tiger, Kurr'fri, Gorilla-Man (Nagan), Piledriver, Sabretooth, Thundra, Trapster, Unicorn, Whirlwind, and Wrecker. The Lethal Legion track down and battle Captain America, who is aided by several other heroes. Their battle with the superheroes is witnessed by the Beyonder, with the outcome left unrevealed.

=== Satannish's Lethal Legion ===
Lethal Legion

Publication information
- Publisher: Marvel Comics
- First appearance: Avengers West Coast #98 (September 1993)
- Created by: Roy Thomas; David Dzon

In-story information
- Base(s): Various
- Member(s): Axe of Violence (Lizzie Borden); Coldsteel (Joseph Stalin); Cyana (Lucrezia Borgia); Hangman; Zyklon (Heinrich Himmler)

In the title Avengers West Coast, the demon Satannish founds a new Lethal Legion using the souls of four infamous historical killers found in Mephisto's section of Hell. They have been given powers along with Hangman and the group battle the renamed Avengers West Coast. The group consisted of Axe of Violence (Lizzie Borden), who has an axe replacing one hand; Coldsteel (Joseph Stalin), an eight-foot-tall giant with superhuman strength, Cyana (Lucrezia Borgia), who wields poisoned claws; and Zyklon (Heinrich Himmler), who can breathe deadly gas from his mouth. This incarnation eventually lose their powers and their souls are destroyed during the struggle between Mephisto and Satannish.

=== Grim Reaper's third Lethal Legion ===
Lethal Legion

Publication information
- Publisher: Marvel Comics
- First appearance: Dark Reign: Lethal Legion #1 (August 2009).
- Created by: Frank Tieri (writer), Mateus Santolouco (artist)

In-story information
- Base(s): Various
- Member(s): Absorbing Man; Grim Reaper; Mister Hyde; Nekra; Tiger Shark; Wonder Man

A new version of the Lethal Legion appears during the "Dark Reign" storyline in the three-issue limited series Dark Reign: Lethal Legion. The Grim Reaper (now aided by his brother Wonder Man) recruits villains to oppose criminal mastermind Norman Osborn.

Absorbing Man, Grey Gargoyle, Mister Hyde, and Tiger Shark later reformed the Lethal Legion and end up fighting the Avengers.

=== Challenger's Lethal Legion ===
Lethal Legion

Publication information
- Publisher: Marvel Comics
- First appearance: Avengers #676 (January 2018).

In-story information
- Base(s): Various
- Member(s): Blood Brothers; Captain Glory; Drall; Ferene the Other; Mentacle; Metal Master

An alien version of the Lethal Legion is formed by Grandmaster to go up against Challenger's Black Order. It consists of the Blood Brothers, Mentacle, Metal Master, Glah-Ree of the Kree, Captain Glory, Drall, and Ferene the Other. Each of its members were saved from their approaching deaths in exchange for serving Grandmaster.

After the contest is ended by the Avengers, the Lethal Legion regroup and flee to Knowhere. As they have nowhere to return to after each one's near-death experience, the Lethal Legion decides to stay together and see what they can accomplish.

=== Count Nefaria's second Lethal Legion ===
Lethal Legion

Publication information
- Publisher: Marvel Comics
- First appearance: The Amazing Spider-Man (vol. 5) #41 (March 2020)

In-story information
- Base(s): Various
- Member(s): Count Nefaria; Grey Gargoyle; Living Laser; Whirlwind

Count Nefaria forms another version of the Lethal Legion, consisting of Grey Gargoyle, Living Laser, and Whirlwind. The group raids a Project Pegasus facility to look for the Catalyst so that Nefaria can regain his powers.

At Empire State University, Curt Connors reveals the Catalyst to the crowd when the Lethal Legion attacks. While Grey Gargoyle and Whirlwind attack the people present, Living Laser helps Count Nefaria to operate the Catalyst. Spider-Man and Sin-Eater both attack the Lethal Legion, with Sin-Eater using his gun to take their powers. All four members are sent to Ravencroft.

=== Hank Pym's Lethal Legion ===
Lethal Legion

Publication information
- Publisher: Marvel Comics
- First appearance: Avengers Inc. #4 (December 2023)

In-story information
- Base(s): Various
- Member(s): Hank Pym; Black Ant; Blizzard; Bullet; Cobra; Lodestone; Mortar; Oddball; Piecemeal; Speed Demon; Sunstroke; Supercharger

After separating himself from Ultron, Hank Pym recreates his body and works with Black Ant to kill several villains (consisting of Blizzard, Bullet, Cobra, Lodestone, Mortar of the Bastards of Evil, Oddball, Piecemeal, Speed Demon, Sunstroke, and Supercharger) and resurrect them as part of the Lethal Legion to prepare for Ultron's return. When Ultron is defeated, the Lethal Legion leave with Pym to regroup in Sub-Atomica and prepare for Ultron's return.

== Other versions ==
=== Heroes Reborn ===
The Lethal Legion appear in Heroes Reborn, formed by the Enchantress and consisting of the Executioner, the Scarlet Witch, Ultron-5, and Wonder Man.

== In other media ==
=== Television ===
The Lethal Legion appears in The Super Hero Squad Show, founded and led by Doctor Doom and consisting of the Abomination, MODOK, Mole Man, Fin Fang Foom, Megataur, Tricephalous, Manoo, Klaw, Toad, Melter, the Wrecking Crew, Sabretooth, the Juggernaut, Pyro, Whirlwind, Zzzax, Egghead, the Ringmaster, Paste Pot Pete, Mystique, the Crimson Dynamo, and Batroc the Leaper. Additionally, Songbird worked undercover in the Lethal Legion as Screaming Mimi. Doom formed this version of the group to help him collect the Infinity Fractals and rebuild the Infinity Sword. In the second season, Molecule Man and Volcana join the Lethal Legion to help break Doom out of the Vault and combat Thanos and the Dark Surfer.

=== Video games ===
- The Lethal Legion appears in Marvel Super Hero Squad.
- The Lethal Legion appears in Lego Marvel Super Heroes, co-led by Doctor Doom, Loki, and Magneto.
- The Lethal Legion appears in Marvel's Guardians of the Galaxy, led by Captain Glory and consisting of the Blood Brothers. This version of the group are bounty hunters and associates of Lady Hellbender.
