= Living Laser =

Marvel Comics fictional character

The Living Laser
- The Living Laser (right) battles Iron Man on the cover of Iron Man #211 (Oct. 1986). Art by Alex Saviuk.

Publication information
- Publisher: Marvel Comics
- First appearance: The Avengers #34 (Nov. 1966)
- Created by: Stan Lee (writer); Don Heck (artist)

In-story information
- Alter ego: Arthur Parks
- Species: Human
- Team affiliations: Lethal Legion; Legion Accursed; Mandarin's Minions
- Abilities: Gifted research scientist; Genius level intellect; Miniature laser diode implants grant: Energy absorption and projection; Invisibility via light refraction; Illusion generation; Limited telepathy; Three-dimensional holographic image creation; Ability to achieve solidification and travel at light speeds

The Living Laser (Arthur Parks) is a supervillain appearing in American comic books published by Marvel Comics. Created by Stan Lee and Don Heck, the character made his first appearance in The Avengers #34 (November 1966). He would become a recurring enemy of Iron Man and plays a key role in the "Iron Man: The Inevitable" miniseries.

Arthur Parks started out as a scientist that invented small, wrist-mounted lasers and used them for criminal pursuits. At one point he was a member of the Lethal Legion and at another point he was poised to take over the world due to his possession of the Serpent Crown, but is foiled by the Avengers. Finally it appeared that the Living Laser had exploded in space, but in reality his body was transformed into photon form, making him an actual living laser.

== Publication history ==
The Living Laser debuted in The Avengers #34 (Nov. 1966) as Arthur Parks, a scientist who created wrist-mounted laser units and a costume. Writer Mike Conroy notes, "Arthur Parks was a scientist sufficiently proficient to design laser projectors small enough to wear on his wrists, quite the achievement in 1966."

Following his appearance in the following issue, the Living Laser resurfaced in Avengers King-Size Special #1 (Sept. 1967). After an appearance in Captain America #105 (Sept. 1968), the character was part of the first version of the Lethal Legion in The Avengers #78–79 (July–Aug. 1970). The Kree hero Mar-Vell encountered an android version of the Living Laser in Captain Marvel #35 (Nov. 1974). The real Laser reappeared in an extended storyline in The Avengers #151 (Sept. 1976); #153 (Nov. 1976) & The Avengers Annual #6 (1976).

After appearing as part of a second version of the Lethal Legion in The Avengers #164–166 (Nov. 1977–Jan. 1978), the character returned in Iron Man #152–153 (Nov.–Dec. 1981) and Iron Man #211 (Oct. 1986). Living Laser featured in the Acts of Vengeance storyline in Quasar #6 (Jan. 1990) and reappeared in a new photon form in Iron Man #259–263 (Aug.-Dec. 1990) before returning in Quasar #30 (Jan. 1992) and Iron Man #289 (Feb. 1993).

Further appearances included the limited series Super-Villain Team-Up: MODOK's 11 #1–5 (Sept. 2007–Jan. 2008) and New Avengers #35 (Oct. 2007). The character returned during the limited series Secret Invasion #1–8 (June 2008–Jan. 2009), and made sporadic appearances in New Avengers.

== Fictional character biography ==
As the "Living Laser", Arthur Parks becomes a mercenary and professional criminal. He develops an infatuation with the heroine Wasp, and after he kidnaps her, he is forced to battle the superhero team the Avengers. He captures Hawkeye and Captain America by placing them in a ring of lasers, but they were able to contact another member who helped them escape. The Living Laser encounters the Avengers again when he tried to conquer a small South American country, but is thwarted and incarcerated.

Living Laser, after breaking out of prison, reappears as part of a team formed by the Mandarin in an unsuccessful attempt to destroy the Avengers. As part of "Batroc's Brigade" (consisting of Living Laser, Swordsman, and Batroc the Leaper) he participated in a battle against Captain America. Living Laser reappears as part of the first version of the Lethal Legion gathered by the Grim Reaper in a failed revenge plot against the Avengers.

Living Laser acquires the Serpent Crown, and while controlling the living weapon Nuklo and a battalion of the US Army attempts to conquer the world, but is defeated by the Avengers. He is then employed, along with fellow villains Power Man and Whirlwind, by Count Nefaria, who temporarily amplifies their abilities and sends them against the Avengers as the second Lethal Legion. The effect, however, is temporary and their combined abilities are drained by Nefaria.

Discovering that the amplification caused a build-up of energy in his body that is reaching a critical, and potentially fatal, level, Living Laser seeks the aid of East German scientists, who offer to drain the excess energy and use it to power a network of weapons satellites. The plan, however, is stopped by Iron Man and in battle with the hero, Living Laser's energy levels build to critical mass. Although Living Laser begs for help, Iron Man has no choice but to hurl him into the atmosphere, where he detonates and apparently dies. Eventually revived, Living Laser battles Iron Man once again.

Living Laser reappears in a new photon form, posing as the deceased Titanium Man while taunting Iron Man. The villain is eventually defeated and banished to an alternate universe. He eventually escapes, and mounts a new attack on Stark Industries. James Rhodes—Stark's friend and employee, currently acting as CEO and operating as Iron Man while Stark is apparently dead—tricks Living Laser by offering him a position at the company before trapping him in a communication chamber, which disperses him across the Andromeda Galaxy.

In "Secret Empire", Living Laser is recruited by Helmut Zemo to join the Army of Evil. Living Laser, Batroc the Leaper, and Whirlwind attack a haggard, bearded man who identifies himself as Steve Rogers. He is assisted by people that appear to be Sam Wilson and a version of Bucky Barnes who never lost his arm.

In the "Sins Rising" storyline, Count Nefaria forms a new incarnation of the Lethal Legion with Living Laser, Grey Gargoyle, and Whirlwind in a plot to target the Catalyst. The Lethal Legion are attacked by Sin-Eater, who takes their powers and sins with his gun.

== Powers and abilities ==
A gifted research scientist with expertise in laser technology and a Ph.D. in physics, Arthur Parks began his criminal career using wrist-mounted laser projection units, and later implants miniature laser diodes into his skin which absorb energy. With the diode implants, Parks is capable of energy projection, light refraction for invisibility and illusion generation.

Parks's material body is eventually replaced by photons due to an overloading of the diode implants. By increasing the density of the photons comprising his form, Parks can achieve "solidity", project photons as energy beams, and create three-dimensional holographic images. The character also possesses limited telepathic abilities and can travel at light speed.

== Other versions ==
=== What If? ===
The alternate universe title What If features a story which the character reforms and works at Stark Industries, with three different outcomes being presented.

=== Heroes Reborn ===
An alternate universe version of Arthur Parks appears in "Heroes Reborn". This version is a businessman who was the head of Parks Fiberoptics until he lost his company to Tony Stark. Parks, now broken and desperate, uses his technology to attack Stark. Stark learns why Parks is attacking him and tries to convince him to stop his attack. Parks refuses to stand down, forcing Stark to kill him.

== In other media ==
=== Television ===
- The Living Laser appears in Iron Man, voiced by Robert Hays. This version is a servant of the Mandarin.
- Arthur Parks / The Living Laser appears in Iron Man: Armored Adventures, voiced by Louis Chirillo. This version is a former Maggia grunt whose powers are derived from a Stark International prototype teleportation vest. After being captured by S.H.I.E.L.D., Parks eventually reforms and leaves Earth to explore the universe.
- The Living Laser appears in The Avengers: Earth's Mightiest Heroes, voiced by Nolan North. This version is a member of the Masters of Evil.
- The Living Laser appears in the Ultimate Spider-Man episode "Flight of the Iron Spider", voiced by Keith Szarabajka. This version is a former Stark Industries employee.

=== Video games ===
- The Living Laser appears in Captain America and the Avengers.
- The Living Laser appears as a boss in Iron Man 3: The Official Game, voiced by Tom Wayland. This version is a mutation created by A.I.M., Aldrich Killian / MODOK, and Ezekiel Stane.
- The Living Laser appears as a boss in Marvel Heroes, voiced by Andrew Kishino.
- The Living Laser appears in Marvel: Avengers Alliance 2.
- Arthur Park / The Living Laser appears as a boss in Iron Man VR, voiced by Leonardo Nam. This version is a Korean-American former Stark Industries employee with a personal vendetta against Tony Stark. After dying under unknown circumstances, Parks is resurrected by Ghost, who provides him with laser armor technology to help her enact revenge against Stark.
