= Grim Reaper (Marvel Comics) =

Marvel Comics fictional character

Eric Williams Grim Reaper
- The Grim Reaper as depicted in The Avengers #160 (June 1977). Art by George Pérez.

Publication information
- Publisher: Marvel Comics
- First appearance: The Avengers #52 (May 1968)
- Created by: Roy Thomas (writer); John Buscema (artist)

In-story information
- Alter ego: Eric Williams
- Species: Human mutate / cyborg
- Team affiliations: Legion of the Unliving; Horsemen of Death; Lethal Legion; Sinister Six; Hydra; Maggia
- Partnerships: Space Phantom; Black Talon; Man-Ape; Goliath; Ultron; Nekra
- Notable aliases: Adopted Son of the Abyss; Left Hand of Darkness; Spawn of Perdition; Son of Darkness; Master of Death; The Reaper
- Abilities: Supernatural strength, stamina, and durability; Energy absorption and projection via scythe; Demon summoning; Illusion casting; Clairvoyance; Teleportation; Necromancy

Eric Williams is a character appearing in American comic books published by Marvel Comics. Created by Roy Thomas and John Buscema, the character first appeared in The Avengers #52 May (1968). Eric Williams is the brother of the superhero Simon Williams / Wonder Man. He is a supervillain and necromancer known under the codename Grim Reaper. The character is an adversary of the Avengers. He has also been a member of the Maggia, Lethal Legion, and Legion of the Unliving at various points in his history.

The character made his live-action debut in the Disney+ original series Wonder Man (2026), set in the Marvel Cinematic Universe (MCU) and portrayed by Demetrius Grosse.

== Publication history ==
=== 1960s ===
Eric Williams debuted in The Avengers #52 May (1968), created by Roy Thomas and John Buscema. He appeared in the 1982 Vision and the Scarlet Witch series, and the 1985 Web of Spider-Man series.

=== 2000s ===
Eric Williams appeared in the 2006 Civil War series, the 2009 Dark Reign: Lethal Legion series, the 2011 Chaos War: Dead Avengers series, the 2012 Uncanny Avengers series, and the 2019 Valkyrie: Jane Foster series.

== Fictional character biography ==
Eric Williams, the brother of Simon Williams, was born in Paterson, New Jersey. He was constantly neglected by his parents, who gave all of their attention to Simon and failed to curb his violent tendencies. Eric eventually becomes a thief and member of the Maggia and moves to Las Vegas, while Simon takes over the family business, Williams Innovations.

After his company is faced with bankruptcy, partly due to competition with Stark Industries, Simon works with Eric and Heinrich Zemo to get revenge and is transformed into Wonder Man. Simon later sacrifices himself to save the Avengers, and Eric becomes the Grim Reaper out of grief.

In his next appearance, the Grim Reaper confronts the Avengers with his original Lethal Legion, composed of the Living Laser, Power Man, Man-Ape, and the Swordsman. He later learns that the Vision was implanted with Simon's brain waves and refuses to harm him, leading to his defeat.

The Grim Reaper later allied with the Space Phantom and Hydra. He planned to transfer the Vision's mind to Wonder Man's body, thus "resurrecting" his brother. He battled the Avengers again and was defeated.

Behind the scenes, the Grim Reaper later had Wonder Man resurrected as a zombie by the Black Talon to attack the Avengers. Wonder Man was restored to true life as a result. Grim Reaper then captured the Avengers, and staged a trial to determine whether the Vision or Wonder Man was his true brother. He was defeated by Wonder Man.

Later, the Grim Reaper attempted to kill both the Vision and Wonder Man, but was defeated by Vision.

Later still, the Grim Reaper with Ultron, Nekra and other allies, captured the Avengers. Grim Reaper attempted a recreation of "Simon Williams" as a zombie. He was pursued by the Vision and Wonder Man in a cave, and died in a fall from the cave ledge. Grim Reaper was then resurrected by Nekra as a zombie, but he believed himself to be alive. The zombie battled Wonder Man and Magneto, but when he realized he was actually dead, he "died" again as a result.

Much later, Immortus resurrects the Grim Reaper as a member of his Legion of the Unliving. Grim Reaper battled Wonder Man, and "died" again of a broken neck. He was then resurrected by Nekra as a zombie again, this time under the condition that he absorb a human life-force every 24 hours. He killed Nekra as his first victim, and then battled Wonder Man before escaping. He battled Wonder Man and the Mandrill, and escaped again. The scythe was fused to his arm by Ultron, and he formed an alliance with Ultron.

The Grim Reaper was later restored to life by the Scarlet Witch's magic. When Ultron attempted to create a new "family" for himself, Grim Reaper was abducted as one of the six individuals that came closest to being Ultron's "family" - the others being Hank Pym, Wasp, Vision, Scarlet Witch, and Wonder Man. Ultron regarded Grim Reaper as the first human connection made apart from Pym, as well as the connections to Wonder Man and Vision. While Vision distracted Ultron, Eric was able to escape his bonds and free the other prisoners, although he subsequently fled, informing Vision that he only released the others to save himself rather than any more noble goal.

The Grim Reaper reappeared during the Secret War aftermath that had been organized by Nick Fury against Latveria. He was among the supervillains who had been supplied with enhanced technology by Latverian dictator Lucia von Bardas and sent to attack the heroes who had been involved in Fury's Secret War.

The Grim Reaper is one of the many villains who escaped from the Raft prison. Being at large for several months, the Grim Reaper was eventually tracked down by Captain America and Cable during the "Civil War" storyline. Captain America and Cable brought Grim Reaper down with the aid of their other friends. He was found bound to a pole along with the Vulture. He was once again put into custody by S.H.I.E.L.D.

During the Dark Reign storyline, the Grim Reaper forms a new incarnation of the Lethal Legion as part of a plan against Norman Osborn. The team is ultimately defeated by the Dark Avengers and H.A.M.M.E.R. agents and imprisoned in the Raft. While there, Grim Reaper is killed by an inmate loyal to Osborn.

During the Chaos War storyline, the Grim Reaper returns from the dead after Death leaves the underworld, and becomes a servant of Amatsu-Mikaboshi. He and Nekra fight the "Dead Avengers" (consisting of Captain Marvel, Deathcry, Doctor Druid, Swordsman, Vision, and Yellowjacket). He manages to kill most of them except for Swordsman and Yellowjacket. Grim Reaper and Nekra are killed when Vision self-destructs.

As part of the 2012-2013 "Marvel NOW!" relaunch, the Grim Reaper appears alive and attacks the Avengers Unity Squad's debut press conference, claiming that he is now unable to die. He is seemingly killed by Rogue after she absorbs Wonder Man's powers. He is restored to life by a Celestial Death Seed, and is recruited by the Apocalypse Twins as part of their new Horsemen of Death. He attacks Simon, defeating and capturing his brother. Grim Reaper destroys Earth and helps teleport all mutants to Planet X. After the Apocalypse Twins are defeated, Grim Reaper escapes with Daken.

He later returns to launch a surprise attack against the Vision's new synthezoid family. The Vision is not present at the time, and Grim Reaper is able to severely injure Viv, Vision's daughter. Vision's wife Virginia fights back, but accidentally kills Grim Reaper in the process, a fact she hides from her husband. After learning of what had happened, Vision decides to keep the events secret to protect his family from the legal consequences and possible backlash from the Avengers.

In the Damnation storyline, Grim Reaper is revived when Doctor Strange restores Las Vegas.

In The War of the Realms, Grim Reaper is approached by Mephisto, who offers him the chance to kill the Vision in return for becoming his new Valkyrie. When Jane Foster taking on the position complicates matters, Grim Reaper is sent to take a hero's soul into the afterlife to cement his claim to the name. He targets Doctor Strange, trapping his soul in a magic mirror. Jane takes him on as Valkyrie, and defeats him by taking him to Valhalla.

In the 2025 The Vision and the Scarlet Witch miniseries, it is revealed that Grim Reaper was cast out of Valhalla due to his pact with the Great Old Ones and was resurrected by Gargantos, granting him new powers in exchange for his service. Seeking revenge against Vision, Grim Reaper lures him and the Scarlet Witch into the Graverealm created by Gargantos and tries to sacrifice them, but is defeated. Displeased, Gargantos devours him, but Vision rescues him and the Scarlet Witch traps him in a magical prison.

== Powers and abilities ==
Eric Williams initially possessed a techno-scythe, which could create energy blasts. He could spin his scythe at rapid speeds, project plasma blasts, and fire electric stun shocks. Williams now wields an enchanted scythe capable of absorbing life energy from others. He later gained mystical abilities as well. His powers allow him to reanimate the dead, teleport himself or others, summon demons, create illusions, and perceive visual sensations. His physical strength, stamina, and durability were slightly heightened beyond the human body's natural limitations.

== Reception ==
Graeme McMillan of Newsarama described the relationship between Eric Williams and Simon Williams as one of the best sibling rivalries in comic books.

== Other versions ==
=== Earth X ===
An alternate universe version of the Grim Reaper from Earth-9997 appears in Earth X.

=== JLA/Avengers ===
The Grim Reaper appears in JLA/Avengers.

=== The Last Avengers Story ===
An alternate universe version of Grim Reaper, William Maximoff, from Earth-9511 appears in The Last Avengers Story.

== In other media ==
=== Television ===
- Eric Williams / Grim Reaper appears in The Avengers: United They Stand episode "The Sorceress' Apprentice", voiced by Allan Royal. This version wears full body armor and a helmet painted to resemble a skull.
- Grim Reaper appears in the Iron Man: Armored Adventures episode "Mandarin's Quest". This version is a Makluan guardian created by the original Mandarin to guard one of his rings and test potential successors by trapping them in nightmarish hallucinations.
- Eric Williams / Grim Reaper appears in The Avengers: Earth's Mightiest Heroes, voiced by Lance Henriksen. This version is a member of Hydra and lieutenant of Baron Strucker.
- Eric Williams / Grim Reaper appears in Avengers Assemble, voiced by Roger Craig Smith.
- Eric Williams appears in Wonder Man (2026), portrayed by Demetrius Grosse. This version is an insurance worker.

=== Film ===
Eric Williams / Grim Reaper makes a cameo appearance in Avengers Confidential: Black Widow & Punisher.

=== Video games ===
- Eric Williams / Grim Reaper appears as a boss in Captain America and the Avengers.
- Eric Williams / Grim Reaper appears as a mini-boss in Marvel: Ultimate Alliance 2, voiced by Rick D. Wasserman.
- Eric Williams / Grim Reaper appears as a boss in Marvel: Avengers Alliance.
- Eric Williams / Grim Reaper appears as a boss in Marvel Heroes, voiced by Robin Atkin Downes.
- Eric Williams / Grim Reaper appears as a playable character in Lego Marvel's Avengers.

=== Merchandise ===
In 2015, Hasbro released an Eric Williams / Grim Reaper action figure, as part of the Marvel Avengers Infinite Series from the Marvel Legends action figure line.
