= Swordsman (character) =

Marvel Comics fictional character

- Swordsman on the cover of The Avengers #19 (August 1965). Art by Don Heck, Jack Kirby, and Frank Giacoia.

Publication information
- Publisher: Marvel Comics
- First appearance: The Avengers #19 (August 1965)
- Created by: Stan Lee (writer); Don Heck (artist)

In-story information
- Alter ego: Jacques Duquesne
- Species: Human
- Team affiliations: Avengers; Emissaries of Evil; Legion of the Unliving; Lethal Legion; Circus of Crime
- Partnerships: Erik Josten (Power Man)
- Abilities: Uses a modified sword that projects various energy beams and gases; Carries various throwing knives and daggers; Highly skilled unarmed combatant; Phenomenal reflexes; Olympic-level athlete; Master swordsman; Cunning strategist

Swordsman (Jacques Duquesne) is a character appearing in American comic books published by Marvel Comics. Created by Stan Lee and Don Heck, the character first appeared in The Avengers #19 (August 1965). Although Swordsman was introduced as an enemy of Hawkeye and the Avengers, the character has since appeared as both a supervillain and a superhero.

A variation of the character, renamed Jack Duquesne ("Jack" is an anglicisation of "Jacques"), appears in the Marvel Cinematic Universe / Disney+ television series Hawkeye (2021) and Daredevil: Born Again (2025-2026). Jack Duquesne is portrayed by Tony Dalton.

== Publication history ==
Swordsman first appeared as a supervillain in The Avengers #19 (1965). He went on to appear in The Avengers #20, 30, 38, 65, 78 and 79 (1965–1970). Swordsman changed his ways and became a superhero in The Avengers #100 (1972) and later became a member of the Avengers in The Avengers #112–130 (1973–1974), Defenders #9–11 (1973), Captain Marvel #32–33 (1974), Fantastic Four #150 (1974), Giant-Size Avengers #2 (1974) and Avengers Spotlight #22 (1989). Later, the Cotati-possessed Swordsman appeared in The Avengers #134, 135, 157, 160 (1975–1977), Giant-Size Avengers #4 (1975) and West Coast Avengers (vol. 2) #39 (1988).

Swordsman has been a member of various supervillain groups, including the Lethal Legion in The Avengers #78–79 (1970) and Iron Man Annual #7 (1984), the Emissaries of Evil in Alpha Flight Special (vol. 2) #1 (1992), and the Legion of the Unliving in The Avengers Annual #16 (1987), Avengers West Coast #61 (1990) and Avengers (vol. 3) #10–11 (1998).

Introduced as a villainous counterpart to Hawkeye in the pages of The Avengers, Swordsman went on to appear in Hawkeye #1 (1983), Solo Avengers #2 (1988), Hawkeye (vol. 3) #3 (2004) and Hawkeye: Blindspot #1 (2011) as part of Hawkeye's origins. Swordsman also battled Captain America in Tales of Suspense #88 (1967) and Captain America #105 (1968).

The 2010–2011 crossover storyline Chaos War saw the return of Swordsman. He was one of the central characters in the tie-in series Chaos War: Dead Avengers (2010–2011). Swordsman also featured in Chaos War #2 & 4–5 (2010–2011) and Chaos War: Ares #1 (2010).

== Fictional character history ==
Jacques Duquesne grows up as a privileged youth in the fictional Southeast Asian nation of Siancong, then under French rule. Unlike his father and other European residents, Duquesne holds no prejudice against the Siancongese natives, and after performing an act of kindness for a native servant, he is invited to join a communist rebellion against French rule. As the costumed Swordsman, Duquesne, fancying himself a swashbuckling freedom fighter, helps liberate Siancong, only to learn that the rebel leader Wong Chu killed Duquesne's father. Devastated and disillusioned, Duquesne departs Siancong to seek adventure. Nothing else is known of Duquesne's early career, but he eventually joins the Carson Carnival of Traveling Wonders; although his swordplay makes him one of the carnival's star attractions, he gradually descends into gambling and drunkenness, his youthful idealism long behind him.

Eventually Duquesne, by now in his thirties or older, takes a young runaway named Clint Barton under his wing and teaches him how to use bladed weapons, while another performer, Trick Shot, teaches Barton archery, at which he proves to be a master. The young Clint stumbles upon Duquesne stealing money from the carnival's paymaster to pay a gambling debt. Clint attempts to turn his mentor over to the law, but is pursued by Duquesne and badly beaten. Before Duquesne can deliver the fatal blow, Trick Shot steps in to save the young boy. Duquesne then flees the carnival and adapts his swordsplay act to become a costumed supervillain.

Years later, Swordsman attempts to join the Avengers (whose members include Clint Barton, now known as the superhero Hawkeye) to take advantage of the benefits that go with an Avenger ID. He is refused entry into the team, largely due to Hawkeye's protests and the fact that he is wanted in different states, and threatens to kill Captain America after capturing him, but the rest manage to rescue him. After failing the first time around, he is accepted into the Avengers. However, he is secretly an agent of the Mandarin, who teleported him to his castle before the Avengers can capture him, and creates a pseudo-image of Iron Man to recommend Swordsman to the Avengers. The Mandarin also fits Swordsman's sword with extra powers, such as firing artificial lightning bolts, though he warns Swordsman that if they are ever pointed at him they will reverse. After joining the Avengers, Swordsman reveals his true intentions and betrays the team, planting a bomb on the control panels which can be activated by remote-control. He soon has a change of heart and betrays the Mandarin to save the Avengers. Despite his heroics, Swordsman leaves the Avengers, knowing that the Mandarin will now be against him. Swordsman goes on to join the Lethal Legion and battle the Avengers.

Swordsman briefly rejoins the Avengers in a war against Ares in Olympus. Later, he meets with Mantis, an ally of the Avengers, and then rejoins the Avengers after he secretly falls in love with her. He subsequently participates in the Avengers/Defenders war.

In his last mission, Duquesne aids the Avengers in the conflict that involves Kang's quest for the "Celestial Madonna". To facilitate his plans, Kang captures the Avengers, but leaves Swordsman behind, considering him useless. Humiliated, Swordsman tracks the captive Avengers to Kang's pyramid base in Gizeh, where he encounters Pharaoh Rama-Tut, Kang's alternate self. With Rama-Tut's help and the assistance of Hawkeye, Swordsman frees his fellow Avengers. It is later revealed that Mantis is in fact the "Celestial Madonna", who will mate with a Cotati and become the mother of the Celestial Messiah. After Kang's plans are foiled and he decides not to leave the Madonna to anyone else, Swordsman sacrifices himself to protect Mantis from Kang.

Mantis soon after marries the eldest of Earth's alien Cotati, who resurrects and possesses Swordsman's corpse. Mantis and Swordsman go on to have a son together called Sequoia, who becomes the Celestial Messiah. After battling the Avengers, the Cotati-possessed Swordsman crumbles to dust.

During the Chaos War storyline, Swordsman is among the deceased heroes released by Pluto to defend the Underworld from Amatsu-Mikaboshi. Returning to Earth, Swordsman joins a team of "dead" Avengers, led by Mar-Vell, who take it upon themselves to protect their unconscious teammates from the Grim Reaper.

In the "Empyre" storyline, the eldest of Earth's Cotati possesses Swordsman's body and allies with Sequoia. The two request the Avengers' help to avoid another Cotati massacre by the Kree/Skrull alliance. However, it quickly transpires that the Cotati are deceiving the Avengers and seek to exterminate all non-plant life, starting with humanity. The Cotati Swordsman is confronted by Black Panther, who destroys him.

== Powers and abilities ==
The Swordsman has no superhuman powers, but is an Olympic-level athlete and cunning strategist with phenomenal reflexes and highly adept at unarmed combat. The Swordsman is a master in the uses of bladed weapons, especially swords and knives.

=== Equipment ===
His main weapon is a sword modified by the super-villain Mandarin from Makluan technology. By pressing one of the buttons on the sword's hilt, the Swordsman can project a concussive force beam, a disintegrating ray, a large jet of flame, electrical energy in a form resembling lightning, or a stream of nerve gas that induced temporary unconsciousness. He also carries various throwing knives and daggers as needed.

== Reception ==
=== Critical reception ===
Sideshow asserted, "Jacques 'Jack' Duquesne, AKA the Swordsman, has led an interesting life both in the comics and on the screen, forging connections to important characters and pushing their heroic development." Rob Bricken of Gizmodo ranked Swordsman 4th in their "12 Marvel Villains Who Should Have Been in Thunderbolts" list. CBR.com ranked Swordsman 7th in their "10 Greatest Swordsmen & Women In DC & Marvel Comics" list, and 15th in their "15 Strongest Swordfighters In Marvel Comics" list.

== Other characters named Swordsman ==
=== Philip Javert ===
Philip Javert, a Swordsman from an alternate universe, is a member of the Gatherers. The Gatherers are brought together by Proctor (an alternate version of the Black Knight) to hunt down every Sersi throughout the multiverse. Proctor and the Gatherers travel to the mainstream Marvel Universe (Earth-616) to kill its version of Sersi. The Swordsman, along with fellow Gatherers member Magdalene, turns against Proctor and briefly joins the mainstream Avengers.

=== Swordswoman ===
A new heroine named Swordswoman appears as a member of the European superhero team known as Euroforce. She is later revealed to be Marjorie, Swordsman's illegitimate teenage daughter from Paris.

=== Villainous Swordsman ===
A new Swordsman later appears, wielding a vibranium alloy katana and claiming to have inherited the mantle of Jacques Duquesne. He attempts to extort money from the town of Sauga River by threatening to flood it, but is defeated by Captain America.

== Other versions ==
=== Heroes Reborn ===
An alternate universe version of the Swordsman appears in "Heroes Reborn". This version wields the Black Knight's Ebony Blade, possesses his Earth-616 counterpart's memories, and adopted the guise of Deadpool.

=== House of M ===
An alternate universe version of the Swordsman appears in House of M: Avengers. This version is a member of Shang-Chi's Dragons criminal organization before he is killed by Bullseye.

=== Marvel Zombies ===
A zombified Swordsman appears in Marvel Zombies.

== In other media ==
=== Television ===
- The Swordsman appears in the "Captain America" and "Avengers" segments of The Marvel Super Heroes, voiced by Ed McNamara.
- The Swordsman appears in The Avengers: United They Stand episode "Comes a Swordsman", voiced by Paul Essiembre. He assists Ringmaster and the Circus of Crime in a plot to steal mythrax bacteria. Despite encountering the Avengers, Swordsman escapes to deliver the bacteria to Zodiac, who subsequently kill him.
- Jacques "Jack" Duquesne / Swordsman appears in TV series set in the Marvel Cinematic Universe (MCU), portrayed by Tony Dalton.
  - The character first appeared in Hawkeye, in which he is a socialite and the former fiancé of Eleanor Bishop who is, until the events of the series, unconnected to Clint Barton.
  - Duquesne appears in Daredevil: Born Again, where he has adopted the Swordsman vigilante moniker. He fights alongside Daredevil against Wilson Fisk’s Anti-Vigilante Task Force (AVTF).

=== Video games ===
- Swordsman appears as a boss in the PSP version of Marvel: Ultimate Alliance.
- Swordsman appears as an unlockable playable character in Lego Marvel's Avengers.
