= Josten =

Josten is a German surname. Notable people with the surname include:

- Andrea Josten, finalist of Deutschland sucht den Superstar
- George Josten (born 1986), American soccer player
- Günther Josten (1921–2004), German Luftwaffe fighter ace
- Julia Josten (born 1978), German television presenter
- Kurt Josten (1912–1994), German-born historian of science and museum curator, largely based in England
- Otto Josten, founder of the Jostens Center in Florida, USA
- Werner Josten (1885–1963), German-born classical music composer based in the USA

== Fictional characters ==
- Conrad Josten, a fictional character in Smuggler comics
- Erik Josten, a former supervillain in the Marvel Comics
- Neil Josten, a fictional character in the All For The Game series

== See also ==
- Jostens, an American company providing school and college yearbooks
