= Firebrand (Marvel Comics) =

Fictional character in comics by Marvel Comics

- The Gary Gilbert incarnation of Firebrand as depicted in Iron Manual Mark 3 #1 (April 2010).

Publication information
- Publisher: Marvel Comics
- First appearance: Iron Man #27 (July 1970)
- Created by: Archie Goodwin (writer); Don Heck (artist)

In-story information
- Alter ego: Gary Gilbert; Russell Broxtel; Richard Dennison; Amanda; Erikson Hades
- Abilities: Powered armor grants: Superhuman strength Flight via flying jets Thermal blasts via flamethrowers Resistance to fire

Firebrand is the name of several supervillains appearing in American comic books published by Marvel Comics. The first and most prominent, Gary Gilbert, is an enforcer for corrupt industrialist Justin Hammer and a former activist who turned to violence after believing peaceful protest produced no results.

== Publication history ==
The Gary Gilbert incarnation of Firebrand first appeared in Iron Man #27 (July 1970), and was created by Archie Goodwin and Don Heck.

The Russell Broxtel incarnation of Firebrand first appeared in Web of Spider-Man #77 (April 1991), and was created by Goodwin and Heck.

The Richard Dennison incarnation of Firebrand first appeared in Iron Man (vol. 3) #4 (March 1998), and was created by Kurt Busiek and Sean Chen.

The Amanda incarnation of Firebrand first appeared in Invincible Iron Man #513 (February 2012), and was created by Matt Fraction and Salvador Larroca.

The sixth unnamed incarnation of Firebrand made his sole appearance in Deadpool (vol. 5) #27 (April 2014), and was created by Fabian Nicieza and Scott Hepburn.

The Erikson Hades incarnation of Firebrand first appeared in Great Lakes Avengers #1 (October 2016), and was created by Zac Gorman and Will Robson.

== Fictional character biography ==
=== Gary Gilbert ===
Gary Gilbert was born in Detroit, Michigan. A superpowered enforcer for corrupt industrialist Justin Hammer, as Firebrand he is a former radical activist saboteur who turns to violence after believing peaceful protest produced no results. Firebrand's "clenched fist" logo on his chest recalls the Black Power movement.

In his first appearance in Iron Man #27 (July 1970), Firebrand describes his experiences demonstrating for the civil rights movement in a speech to Iron Man:

"I'm just an all-American boy, Iron Man, one of those wide-eyed innocents who started out to make the world a better place. I sat in for Civil Rights, marched for peace, demonstrated on campus, and got chased by vicious dogs, spat on by bigots, beat on by "patriots", choked by tear gas, and blinded by mace until I finally caught on. This country doesn't want to be changed! The only way to build anything decent is to tear down what's here and start over."

While the story includes some positive messages about the civil rights movement, Firebrand is presented as a villain, because he sets himself outside of the existing political structure, and is willing to let innocents die to further his political and social aims. In his article "Everyday Heroism in Superhero Narratives", Michael Goodrum writes, "Having pursued tactics of accommodation without result, he turns to confrontation, asserting that there is nothing of value left in the system if it treats peaceful reformers with violence — essentially laying bare the coercive nature of power. It is Firebrand's absolutism that marks him as a villain in terms of the narrative."

Firebrand accidentally killed his own father. He also won the Black Lama's "War of the Supervillains". He then fell to alcoholism and gave up political activism only to work for other villains because he "needed the work". He later gave up his costumed identity and became a "supervillain agent", brokering employment for other costumed villains.

When news of the Scourge of the Underworld's initial wave of supervillain murders spread among the criminal community, Gilbert took it upon himself to gather several costumed criminals for a meeting to determine what should be done about this menace. The meeting, held at an abandoned tavern in Medina County, Ohio, known among the criminal underworld as "The Bar With No Name", turned out to be a massacre, as Scourge infiltrated the event disguised as a bartender; a few minutes into the meeting, Scourge slaughtered every criminal present, including Gilbert, with machine gun fire.

Firebrand was later among seventeen of the criminals murdered by the Scourge, who were resurrected by The Hood using the power of Dormammu as part of a squad assembled to eliminate the Punisher. After the Punisher is captured, he is present at the ritual where the Hood intends to resurrect the Punisher's family. Microchip shoots G. W. Bridge in the head, which activates the ritual using Bridge's life force to resurrect Microchip and Punisher's families. The Punisher refuses to accept this, and forces Firebrand to burn his family alive, and then Punisher shoots Firebrand in the back of the head.

=== Russ Broxtel ===
After Gilbert's death, a man named Russ Broxtel becomes Firebrand and joins the Force of Nature. With Force of Nature, he also battled Cloak and Dagger and the New Warriors. Firebrand was later hired by R.A.I.D and helped into London by Fasaud. The Arabian Knight confronted Firebrand who struck back with a wall of flame. Protected by his magic uniform, the Knight stopped Firebrand.

After Civil War, Firebrand returned to the United States. Donning a new suit, he attempted to rob a gas station. He was stopped by Young Avengers members Hawkeye and Patriot. Firebrand escaped and was later seen along with King Cobra, Mauler and Mister Hyde, who attacked Yellowjacket, Constrictor and other Initiative staff and trainees.

=== Richard L. "Rick" Dennison ===
Richard L. "Rick" Dennison was the third Firebrand. He was an anti-capitalist eco-terrorist who worked with a group called the Flaming Sword, and he fought Iron Man on several occasions. After he recovered, Firebrand returned with the Flaming Sword and kidnapped Osborn Chemical vice-president Charles Standish. He was then confronted by the Avengers and he was defeated. Firebrand later appeared as a member of the Shadow Council's incarnation of the Masters of Evil.

Baron Zemo later recruited Firebrand, Flying Tiger and Plantman to join his "New Masters". They later encounter Steve Rogers, the original Captain America, Free Spirit and Jack Flag. During the fight, Firebrand is defeated by Free Spirit.

=== Amanda ===
A female Firebrand was recruited by Mandarin and Zeke Stane in a plot to dispose of Iron Man. She is later hired along with Living Laser and Vibro by a Colombian drug lord to protect his bunker from Iron Man, who is after an Extremis virus sample; she ends up knocked unconscious by sleeping gas released from Iron Man's armor. During the Infinity storyline, Firebrand was among the villains enlisted by Spymaster to attack Stark Tower. In this appearance, her first name is revealed to be Amanda.

=== Unnamed Firebrand ===
An unnamed incarnation of Firebrand appears in Deadpool (vol. 5) #27 as a criminal who Deadpool targets and later kills.

=== Erikson Hades ===
Erikson Hades is the sixth Firebrand and one of several villains hired by councilman Dick Snerd to attack Detroit.

== Powers, abilities, and equipment ==
Each incarnation of Firebrand wields armor with wrist-mounted flamethrowers and jets that allow them to fly.

== In other media ==
- The Gary Gilbert incarnation of Firebrand appears in the Iron Man episode "Fire and Rain", voiced by Neal McDonough. This version is the son of late ex-Stark Industries employee Simon Gilbert, who had stolen money from Tony Stark and started a fire that killed himself, which Gary blamed Stark for. Calling himself Firebrand, Gary attacks power sources and demands a ransom of a million dollars before Iron Man stops him.
- The unnamed Firebrand appears in the Iron Man: Armored Adventures episode "World on Fire". This version is a fire spirit who was created by the original Mandarin to guard one of his rings and test potential successors.
