= Nightwatch (character) =

- Cover art for Nightwatch #1.

Publication information
- Publisher: Marvel Comics;
- First appearance: As Kevin Trench: Web of Spider-Man #97 (February 1993); As Nightwatch: Web of Spider-Man #99 (April 1993); As Nighteater: She-Hulk (vol. 3) #12 (February 2015)
- Created by: Terry Kavanagh (writer); Alex Saviuk (co-artist); Joe Rubinstein (co-artist)

In-story information
- Full name: Kevin Barry Trench
- Notable aliases: Warbringer; Trench
- Abilities: Enhanced strength, agility and reflexes Hand-to-hand combatant Flight via cape

Nightwatch, also known as Nighteater, is a fictional character appearing in American comic books published by Marvel Comics. He exists in Marvel's main shared universe, known as the Marvel Universe. His creation, appearance and abilities were inspired by the success of the character Spawn.

== Publication history ==
Kevin Trench, first appeared in Web of Spider-Man #97 (February 1993). Trench took on the Nightwatch identity two issues later, in Web of Spider-Man #99.

Most of his appearances came in the 1990s in various titles starring Spider-Man and in his own short-lived, self-titled key series. One of his more prominent roles was in the Maximum Carnage crossover, a fourteen-part miniseries that ran in the Spider-Man titles in 1993. The character returned in a 2014-2015 storyline in She-Hulk, in which he was retroactively revealed as originally being a supervillain known as Nighteater.

== Fictional character biography ==
=== Original appearances ===
Doctor Kevin Trench, upon witnessing a costumed man seemingly die battling terrorists, unmasks the body to learn that it is an older version of himself. Trench takes the suit and flees to a deserted island to prevent his future from coming to pass. However, the criminal Alfredo steals one of Trench's gloves after washing up on the island and recovering. After dealing with Alfredo, Trench decided that he cannot avoid his destiny, and decides to investigate the costume's origins.

As Nightwatch, Trench discovers that his ex-girlfriend was working for Morelle Pharmaceuticals on a nanotech project. Project head Phillip Morelle has been recklessly conducting nanotech experiments to make a replacement skin for his dying son Justin. Nightwatch fights his way onto Morelle's space station to confront him and is confronted by two assassins who Morelle has brought backwards in time. Morelle's time portal allows a future version of Justin Morelle to travel into the present. Future Justin, armed with a more advanced version of Nightwatch's suit, kills his father and reveals that the nanotechnology his father was developing produced a dangerously unstable energy matrix that in his timeline devastated North America, killing billions. Justin upgraded Nightwatch's armor and worked with him to destroy the space station before the disaster could happen. Justin successfully receives the nanotech skin as his father intended. Seeing his ex happy with her healed son, Nightwatch travels into the past to complete the time loop. This ensures his own death, but prevents Justin's future from becoming the true future.

=== She-Hulk Vol. 3 ===
The character reappears in the 2014-2015 run of She-Hulk as a civilian working in law alongside Jennifer Walters (She-Hulk). Trench is revealed to have survived his original previously established "death" and has been working in the past and maintaining a low profile. Trench spreads word of Walters's fledgling law practice, bringing an influx of new potential clients to her office.

Trench keeps Walters from investigating the "blue file": a lawsuit filed in a North Dakota county court which names She-Hulk and a small group of heroes and villains as defendants. However, nobody has any recollection of the plaintiff or the associated incident. It is later revealed In the years after leaving the island, Trench became the supervillain known as Nighteater. Eventually wishing to become a lower-level superhero for selfish reasons – desiring respect, money, power, and a comfortable and safe retirement – Trench hired Doctor Druid, Shocker, and Vibro to cast a spell that effectively "retconned" all memories and all existing documented history into believing that he had been a superhero for years. Walters eventually uncovers the truth behind Nighteater and brings him to justice.

== Powers and abilities ==
Nightwatch's costume boosts his strength and durability by triggering his adrenal glands, and can repair itself. His cape responds to his subconscious thoughts to move on its own to attack his foes as well as allowing him to glide on air. After he is boosted by the later-generation Morelle technology, the durability of the costume increases, the cape becomes more metallic, and he gains something closer to true flight in addition to increased speed and nanotech blades. These qualities were later applied to his trenchcoat.

== In other media ==
A Nightwatch film was claimed to be in development for Sony's Spider-Man Universe, with Spike Lee reportedly being considered to direct. Lee later denied his involvement with the film. Following the financial failures of Madame Web and Kraven the Hunter and the underperformance of Venom: The Last Dance, it was announced that Sony would cease making spin-off films that did not feature Spider-Man, most likely including the Nightwatch film.
