= Mandarin (character) =

Marvel Comics fictional character

- The Mandarin on the cover of The Invincible Iron Man #511 (Dec. 2011). Art by Salvador Larroca.

Publication information
- Publisher: Marvel Comics
- First appearance: Tales of Suspense #50 (Feb. 1964)
- Created by: Stan Lee; Don Heck

In-story information
- Species: Human
- Team affiliations: Avatars; Hand; Mandarin's Minions; Tong
- Notable aliases: Gene Kahn; Zhang Tong; Tem Borjigin
- Abilities: Genius-level intellect; Master martial artist and hand-to-hand combatant; Expert strategist and tactician; Wears 10 rings that grant various powers

Altered in-story information for adaptations to other media
- Alter ego: Arnold Brock – Iron Man: The Animated Series; Gene Khan / Temugin – Iron Man: Armored Adventures; Xu Wenwu – Marvel Cinematic Universe

The Mandarin is a supervillain appearing in American comic books published by Marvel Comics. He is the archenemy of Iron Man. The character was created by Stan Lee and designed by Don Heck, first appearing in Tales of Suspense #50 (Feb. 1964). The character is described as being born in China before the Communist revolution to a wealthy Chinese father and an English aristocratic mother, both of whom died when he was young. He is characterized as a megalomaniac, attempting to conquer the world on several occasions, yet also possessing a strong sense of honor. The Mandarin is portrayed as a genius scientist and a skilled martial artist. However, his primary sources of power are 10 rings that he adapted from the alien technology of a crashed spaceship. Each ring has a different power and is worn on a specific finger. Though his primary obsession is Iron Man, given his high status as a supervillain, he has also come into conflict with Thor, Hulk, Shang-Chi, and other superheroes in the Marvel Universe.

The Mandarin has appeared in several forms of media. In the Marvel Cinematic Universe (MCU) film, Iron Man 3 (2013), two characters lay claim to the title of The Mandarin: Trevor Slattery, a hired actor portrayed by Ben Kingsley, and Aldrich Killian, Slattery's superpowered benefactor portrayed by Guy Pearce. Later, Tony Leung portrayed Xu Wenwu, the "real" character that inspired Slattery and Killian's scheme, in Shang-Chi and the Legend of the Ten Rings (2021).

== Publication history ==
The Mandarin first appeared in Tales of Suspense #50 (Feb. 1964), written by Stan Lee and illustrated by Don Heck.

When discussing the character's creation, Heck stated "That was Stan Lee's character, really. He wanted him because he was thinking of [...] one of those old stories that they had years ago Fu Manchu and that's what he said to me. He said, 'I want a character like Fu Manchu.'"

== Fictional character biography ==
=== Origins ===
The Mandarin's late father was one of the wealthiest men in pre-revolutionary mainland China and a descendant of Genghis Khan, while his late mother was an English noblewoman. Their son was born in an unnamed village in mainland China before the Communist revolution. The boy's parents died soon after his birth, and he was raised by his paternal aunt, who was embittered against the world and raised him with much the same attitude. Every last bit of the family fortune was spent obsessively training the Mandarin in science and combat, with the result that he was penniless by adulthood. Without the means to pay their taxes, the Mandarin's estate and possessions were seized by the Chinese government.

Seeking the power to take revenge, the Mandarin explores the forbidden Valley of Spirits, where no one has dared to set foot for centuries. There he finds the starship and skeleton of Axonn-Karr, an intelligent dragon-like alien from the planet Maklu IV, who had come to Earth centuries ago and died. Over the following years, the Mandarin studies Makluan science until he masters it. He also learns how to use the ten rings that he found within the starship, which are apparently its propulsion source, among other things. The Mandarin then becomes a conqueror, and subjugates the villages around the Valley, and through his advanced science, rapidly becomes a power that not even the Chinese army can successfully challenge. He then embarks on a long series of attempts to achieve world domination. The Chinese, though fearing him, ask for his help, but he will not become subservient to them.

The Mandarin sees technology as the surest means to achieve his goals. Over the years, he frequently attempts to turn the weapons and computers of various nations against them. Among the Mandarin's earliest schemes is the sabotage and theft of American missiles and spy planes built by Tony Stark. To restore public confidence in his workmanship, Stark dons his Iron Man armor and flies to China to investigate. Iron Man soon became the Mandarin's principal obstacle against his plans for world domination. He often attempts to pit Iron Man against the Chinese government to defeat both.

The cover of Tales of Suspense #50 (Feb. 1964), the first appearance of the Mandarin, art by Jack Kirby

During three of their early confrontations, the Mandarin manages to take Iron Man (or his alter ego Tony Stark) captive, but fails to kill him. Similarly, Iron Man thwarts the Mandarin's various schemes, but is unable to bring him to justice. Some of the Mandarin's early technological achievements are the launching of a small orbiting satellite whose "death-ray" he aims at Stark Industries, and the building (later retconned as "the reprogramming, the refitting, and the recharging") of Ultimo, a 30-foot (9.1 m) humanoid android possessing vast destructive power. The Mandarin would employ Ultimo four times over the years, but it was always defeated by Iron Man.

The Mandarin's teleportation technology, derived from Makluan science, enables him to kidnap people at will or teleport himself out of threatening situations. He teleports the Swordsman to his castle just before the Avengers capture him, plotting to use him to destroy the Avengers and adding the technology to his sword to aid him, though the Swordsman betrays him and throws the bomb away. During his fifth encounter with Iron Man, the Mandarin teleports Happy Hogan, a friend and confidant of Iron Man, to his castle in China half a world away. Hogan is wearing the Iron Man armor at the time to help protect his employer's secret identity, and the Mandarin mistakes him for his foe. In rescuing Hogan, Iron Man physically bests the Mandarin in personal combat for the first time. Iron Man redirected the missiles that the Mandarin had launched so that they hit the Mandarin's castle, destroying it. The Mandarin escaped by means of his teleportation machinery and he materialized aboard his orbiting satellite. There, he constructs a gem-like device capable of broadcasting "hate-rays" toward Earth. The Mandarin, using his teleportation technology, assembles several former enemies of the Avengers to perform missions for him: the Living Laser, who attacks Asia with Ultimo, but is beaten by Thor and Hawkeye; the original Power Man and the Swordsman, who, with an army of mercenaries, attacked a South American country, but are beaten by Goliath, the Wasp, and Iron Man; Amora the Enchantress; and Skurge the Executioner, who lead an army of trolls in Africa, but are beaten by Hercules and the Scarlet Witch. The Avengers manage to thwart the Mandarin's scheme after getting to the satellite, despite being hit by his hate-rays that make each of them attack the person nearest to themselves. However, the Wasp is nearest to the Mandarin and her attack on him shuts off the rays. The Mandarin is sucked into space and the Avengers are able to destroy his satellite.

The Mandarin then establishes a base in China's Gobi Desert, and turns his attention to the Hulk for a time, hoping to make the dull-witted brute into an accomplice. Two attempts at controlling the Hulk proved futile. First he places a device on the Hulk's neck, hoping to use him to start a war which will allow the Mandarin to take over the world. However, Nick Fury foils this scheme. Next, the Mandarin allies himself with the American criminal the Sandman, who had just been beaten by the Hulk earlier. The Hulk destroys the Mandarin's desert base and the Mandarin sends the Sandman into a hot vat, turning him to glass. The glass later shatters, and the Sandman has to recover slowly in the Mandarin's satellite den. When the Mandarin next attacks Iron Man, he employs an android in the Hulk's likeness rather than the real Hulk. The Mandarin sets up a makeshift base of operations in the United States, and attempts to discredit Tony Stark publicly. Holding Iron Man captive for the fourth time, the Mandarin tries to learn if Iron Man is actually Stark, but Stark fools him with a rubber mask over his own features. His plans thwarted, the Mandarin tries to kill Stark's then-girlfriend, Janice Cord, but the Mandarin's betrothed Mei Ling saves her at the cost of her own life.

=== Forming the Avatars ===
The Mandarin later formed his version of the Avengers (or the Avatars of the Mandarin). He first sent them to attack Hong Kong where they were defeated by Force Works.

=== New bodies ===
Returning to China, the Mandarin seeks a means to increase his rings' power, and learns of the legendary Eye of Yin, a talisman of power created by an ancient group of Chinese sorcerers. The Mandarin manipulates the Royal Family of the Inhumans who, at the time, live in the nearby Himalayan Mountains of Tibet, into locating the idol for him. Yet before he can fully incorporate the Eye's power in his rings, Black Bolt, the ruler of the Inhumans, overpowers him, strips him of his rings, and hides them. Unable to find the rings, the Mandarin journeys back to the Valley of Spirits and the ruins of the Makluan starship, where he first acquired the rings. There he found a headband containing technology which enabled him to recover the rings. The Mandarin uses his newfound power to restore his castle to its original state. The Unicorn, another frequent opponent of Iron Man, seeks the Mandarin's aid in curing him of a progressive disease. The Mandarin and the Unicorn travel to the United States to attack their common enemy, Iron Man, but in the heat of battle, the Mandarin finds that the headband has somehow exchanged his consciousness with that of the Unicorn. The Mandarin is forced to flee, desperate to separate himself from the Unicorn's dying body.

When the Mandarin arrives at his castle in China, he finds that it has been taken over by the Yellow Claw, another master criminal and warlord of Chinese origin. The Mandarin is forced to flee to another laboratory to try to restore his mind to its rightful body, which he manages with the unwilling aid of the Japanese mutant Sunfire. In a subsequent battle with Iron Man, the Mandarin's interim headquarters is destroyed. The Mandarin then launches an attack on the Yellow Claw in an attempt to regain his own castle, but is fatally injured when the Yellow Claw robot he is battling explodes. In a battle between Iron Man and the Yellow Claw that follows, the Mandarin's castle is also destroyed for the second time. However, unknown to the Yellow Claw, as the Mandarin is dying, he uses the headband's mind-transferring capacities to transfer his consciousness into his 10 rings. When the rings are confiscated by the Yellow Claw's power-hungry servant Loc Do and activated by him, the Mandarin's consciousness enters his body, permanently driving out Loc Do's consciousness. Using his matter-rearranger ring, the Mandarin transforms Loc Do's body into a younger duplicate of his own original one.

The Mandarin returns to his castle, discovering that it has again been destroyed. After rebuilding it, the Mandarin attempts to capture Iron Man with his teleportation devices, but once again catches someone else clad in his armor. This time it is Michael O'Brien, later to become a friend of Stark's and the second man to wear the Guardsman's armor. Iron Man flies to O'Brien's rescue, clad in an older armor, saves O'Brien, thwarts the Mandarin's attempt to bomb the United States, and for a second time bests him in personal combat and then destroys his castle again. Perhaps due to the effect of the Mandarin's mental domination ring on him, Iron Man does not take the Mandarin into custody, but allows him to remain free.

The Mandarin later schemes to turn the Vibranium Mound of Wakanda into Type II Vibranium, which can destroy the molecular cohesion of metals. He also tries to destroy China's entire rice crop with radiation in an attempt to force a starving nation into war. In the second of these plots, the Mandarin encounters James Rhodes during Rhodes' custodianship of the Iron Man armor.

=== Heart of Darkness ===
When Stark tries to set up a branch of Stark Enterprises in Hong Kong, Iron Man and the Mandarin once again come into conflict. The Mandarin has taken the name of Zhang Tong, and had become a financial leader in Hong Kong. As Tong, he controls a number of government officials and industry leaders of Hong Kong. The Mandarin thwarts all of Stark's attempts to set up a business branch, even resorting to murder. The Mandarin now employs the Hand to do his dirty work. When on a mission, a Hand member is allowed to take one of the Mandarin's rings and use its powers. As a precaution, if the Hand member is to be captured, he will fanatically try to kill himself. If the Hand member is to be killed or knocked out, the ring will automatically teleport back to the Mandarin. The Mandarin's agents kidnap James Rhodes and several of Stark's other employees, forcing Iron Man into single combat in exchange for their lives. Iron Man defeats the Mandarin once again, and helps Stark's employees escape the Hand. The Mandarin's minions are left without their weapons when their master is knocked unconscious, causing his rings to teleport back to him automatically and leaving them unarmed and unable to stop Stark's employees from fleeing.

At one point, during a period in which the then thought-dead X-Men had disbanded, the mutant heroine Psylocke passes through the mystic portal known as the Siege Perilous. The portal relocates her to an Asian shore, leaving her an amnesiac. Matsu'o Tsurayaba finds her and believes he could save his brain-dead lover Kwannon by switching her mind with Psylocke. He makes an arrangement with the Mandarin to help him with the switch, since his rings will be able to facilitate it. Working with the otherdimensional sorceress Spiral, they are able to do this successfully. The Mandarin conditions Psylocke (now in Kwannon's body) to believe herself to be Lady Mandarin, the Mandarin's assassin. During this time, the Mandarin teams up with several other villains during the "Acts of Vengeance" storyline. He also confronted the Avengers. After completing several assignments for him, Psylocke is eventually rescued by her X-Men teammates Wolverine and Jubilee. The three then defeat the Mandarin, causing events which lead to the severing of the Mandarin's relationship with the Hand.

Sometime later, the Mandarin discovered that one of his rings is an elaborate counterfeit. One of his underlings had betrayed him, surrendering the ring to Chen Hsu, an ancient wizard who lived in San Francisco. Hsu, elfin in appearance but puissant in power, gives up the ring to the Mandarin, who collapses as soon as he put it on. Chen Hsu tends to him, removing the veil of confusion from his mind; soon, the Mandarin realizes that his memories had been fragmented because of the theft of the ring since the rings were still linked to his consciousness.

Next, Chen Hsu makes the Mandarin an offer that involves them traveling to the Valley of the Dragons. There, Chen Hsu uses a magic herb to awaken Fin Fang Foom, an ancient and powerful dragon. Under the control of Hsu, the dragon obeys the Mandarin, laying waste to an army sent by the Chinese government to stop him. Soon the Mandarin claims a third of China's territory, and the authorities sent out a call for help to Iron Man.

When Iron Man confronts the Mandarin and Fin Fang Foom, eight other dragons appear. It is revealed that many thousands of years ago, a number of aliens from the planet Kakaranathara, the fourth planet of the star Maklu, traveled to Earth to look for the conflict which was unknown in their culture and which they craved. The ship crashed, stranding them on Earth for thousands of years, after which the Mandarin found the ship and claimed their rings. Now, they demand them back, but he refuses them. Iron Man forcibly combines his power with the rings, and manages to destroy the Makluan dragons. The blast vaporizes the Mandarin's hands and renders him comatose.

For months, he lies in a state between life and death, in the care of a peasant woman who does not know who he is. Over time, his hands grow back, though they do so as reptilian claws, and the rings call to him again to reclaim them.

The Mandarin discovers the Heart of Darkness, an orb of apparently mystic energy; the alien Century believes it is an ancient artifact which acts as a "lens" to attract and focus all manner of dark power. The Mandarin uses its power to turn back time in China, and literally transforms it into a feudal nation again, one in which electronic equipment cannot not operate. Iron Man, with his team Force Works and ally War Machine defeat him, but not before the Mandarin discovers that Tony Stark is the man inside the Iron Man armor.

Iron Man infects the Mandarin with a techno-organic virus, and the Heart, seeing him infected with technology, rejects the Mandarin and implodes. Iron Man believes him dead, though in reality the Mandarin has been transported away and transformed by the last flare of the orb's magic into a janitor in the Hong Kong branch of Stark Enterprises.

Eventually, the Mandarin's memories return to him. The Mandarin believes that the feudalism of yesterday has merely been transformed into the capitalism of today, leading him to set into motion plans to create a giant flying fortress called the Dragon of Heaven, through which he can conquer Russia and eventually the world. During this time, Iron Man reappears after being believed dead in a battle against the psychic menace Onslaught. The Mandarin initiates a series of attacks on Iron Man, culminating in a battle with the Dragon of Heaven. Eventually it is revealed that the Mandarin's primary purpose is not to conquer Russia, but instead to test Iron Man himself, prove him worthy as a foe, and to justify the Mandarin's own thoughts on the feudal nature of capitalism. The Mandarin appears to die as the Dragon of Heaven explodes, but Iron Man is not convinced that his foe has truly met his end.

=== Temugin ===
Despite the uncertainty of his fate, it would be nearly 10 years before the Mandarin returned to the pages of Iron Man. In the interim, Iron Man faces the Mandarin's son, Temugin. Temugin has precious few memories of his father, and most of them involve his father taking him to the monastery where he was raised and trained by monks. Temugin is sensitive, spiritual, and extremely powerful because of his control of chi, the living force in all things.

One day, Temugin receives a package containing the severed hands of the Mandarin, bearing all 10 rings of power. Temugin knows that he is honor-bound to fulfill his father's wishes for him. He challenges Iron Man to avenge his father's death, and he proves a deadly adversary even without the rings.

After Tony Stark reveals a conspiracy for mass murder in his own ranks, Temugin appears to have forgiven Iron Man for the death of his father and to have turned to more lofty pursuits, but events indicate that the evil power of the rings has corrupted his soul.

Temugin had been named after his, and the Mandarin's, claimed ancestor Genghis Khan, whose birth name was Temujin (also spelled Temuchin, Temudjin, u also variates to ü).

Temugin is later contacted by the double-crossing Spot, who gives him a super-weapon that MODOK had been planning to steal. In this appearance, Temugin speaks of the Mandarin as "my late father", and bears the rings, one of which he uses to imprison the Spot in another dimension with nothing but money. In the following issue, the Puma tears off at least one of Temugin's hands, but despite this, he retained at least half of the rings—and possibly all of them, as Nightshade, who used the rings on his lost hand, is not seen with them at the end of the story.

Nevertheless, he later reappeared without the rings, and with a cybernetic arm, as a member of the Atlas Foundation, having been selected as a secondary candidate for the position of its ruler by the ancient dragon Mr. Lao. In this capacity he is a constant irritant to Jimmy Woo, the head of Atlas.

=== Revival ===
The Mandarin is revived in a subsequent Iron Man story arc, in which he is revealed to have been in a prison in central China for some time. It is revealed that he has lost his hands (most likely the hands that were sent to Temugin were, in fact, actually the Mandarin's), and that he has been living with no food or water for years, an ability that is likely due to his mastery of chi. Despite being handless and starved, he is able to kill several men armed with guns via his mastery of the martial arts. His rings have been returned to him and have been re-assimilated into his body by heating them and burning them into his spine.

After attacking Iron Man, via S.H.I.E.L.D.—with dozens of unwitting proxies in the form of extremist splinter groups, equipped by him with hyper-advanced biological weapons—he eventually resurfaces as Tem Borjigin (yet another name of Genghis Khan), now employing artificial hands.

=== Government infiltration ===
The Mandarin infiltrates the U.S. government via his role as CEO of Prometheus, a corporation specializing in bio-engineered weaponry. He appears to be using Tony Stark's former love interest Maya Hansen to produce an army of soldiers enhanced with Extremis, an artificial biotech virus created by Hansen that when introduced into a subject with a specific gene receptive to it (which only 2.5% of the population possess), grants that subject a super-boosted immune system and a greatly enhanced healing ability that can spontaneously generate new, improved organs, but which increases aggression and kills anyone injected with it who lacks the gene for it. The Mandarin is also financing and arming terrorists around the globe, and plans to unleash the Extremis virus on the public, expecting the 97.5% fatality ratio to cause a mass catastrophe of deaths. The Mandarin admits to Hansen that even he will die in the outbreak, but she and those with the gene to survive will become free from disease and effectively immortal. Though he has his Extremis virus disabled, Iron Man defeats the Mandarin while wearing the Silver Centurion armor by tearing five of the rings out of the Mandarin's spine, blasting him with those rings, his unibeam, and his repulsor rays at the same time and then freezing him as he is engulfed in a deadly concentrated Extremis virus. Iron Man then prevents the Extremis outbreak.

When the Mandarin's apparently frozen body is autopsied, all that is found is a blackened husk, not unlike an Extremis chrysalis.

=== Enter the Mandarin ===
In 2007, the Mandarin appeared in Iron Man: Enter the Mandarin, an expanded and modified retelling of his earliest appearances in Tales of Suspense. The series was written by Joe Casey and drawn by Eric Canete.

=== "Mandarin: The Story of My Life" ===
In The Invincible Iron Man vol. 4 Annual #1 by Matt Fraction, a new updated origin of the Mandarin is offered. Here, the Mandarin kidnaps a popular film director to tell his life's story. He relates the same story that he once told Iron Man in Tales of Suspense of his English noblewoman mother and his schooling at the finest boarding schools in the land. The director learns that much of what the Mandarin says is contradictory and false, and it is hinted that the Mandarin has used one of his own rings to make himself believe this tapestry of half-truths. The director discovers that the Mandarin was the son of an opium den prostitute who went on to become a powerful underworld figure before discovering the Ten Rings of Power in an alien craft, the pilot of which he brutally slew to obtain them. The Mandarin slaughtered the Red Chinese army officials for daring to cross him, while financing his operations with drug and gun smuggling, aided by the mercenary Raza. In this retelling, he is also said to have been at the camp in which Tony Stark constructed his Iron Man armor, though Stark is unaware of this fact.

Angered at the Mandarin holding his wife hostage, the director shoots the film as he wishes, not as the Mandarin dictates. The Mandarin denounces this telling of his past as lies and angrily destroys the theater in which it was being shown before having the director killed. Later, he regrets murdering the director, noting that he really did love his films.

=== "Stark Resilient" ===
At the conclusion of the 2010–2011 "Stark Resilient" storyline, it is revealed that the Mandarin is the father of Sasha Hammer, as she introduces her boyfriend Zeke Stane to her parents.

With help from Stane, Mandarin recruits Blizzard, Chemistro, Crimson Dynamo, Firebrand, Firepower, Living Laser, Melter, Mauler, Titanium Man, Vibro, and Whirlwind, and builds new Dreadnought robots in a plot to take out Iron Man.

=== "Long Way Down", "The Future", and death ===
In the 2012 storyline "The Long Way Down", it is revealed that the Mandarin has gained some measure of mental control over Tony Stark, apparently established around the time of the "World's Most Wanted" and "Stark Disassembled" story arcs, wherein Stark effectively wiped his own mind to safeguard critical S.H.I.E.L.D. data from Norman Osborn and H.A.M.M.E.R. How the Mandarin gained this control is as yet unrevealed, but it has been stated that he is "in [Stark's] head" and had been observing and influencing his actions since Stark's return to public life. Among these actions were implanted design ideas for "Titanomechs", huge squid-like war machines apparently capable of taking over the world (as seen in an alternate future in The Invincible Iron Man #500).

This led into the next storyline "The Future", in which the Mandarin kidnaps Stark and brings him to Mandarin City to develop 10 Titanomechs, which Mandarin plans to use as host bodies for each of his 10 rings, which he reveals are vessels for the souls of 10 alien beings. In truth, the Mandarin serves these beings and has planned all along to "resurrect" them in this fashion.

Tony forms an alliance with others that the Mandarin has imprisoned, including Ezekiel Stane, Whirlwind, Blizzard, and the Living Laser. In a rebellion against the Mandarin, Stark manages to alert his staff at Stark Resilient to find him and manages to destroy the Titanomechs. In the ensuing battle, the Mandarin is apparently killed by Stane, much to the dismay of Iron Man.

=== Rings of the Mandarin ===
In the Marvel NOW! relaunch of Iron Man by writer Kieron Gillen, the Mandarin's rings managed to escape from S.H.I.E.L.D.'s Weapon Vault Omega, the Mento-Intensifier Ring staying behind to create the illusion that the rings were still there. Each of the rings later started finding new hosts with the purpose of "saving Earth from Tony Stark", using persuasive language and mind control to bend them towards their cause against Iron Man. Each one of them has been codenamed, from Mandarin-One to Mandarin-Ten:

- The Matter-Rearranger Ring was taken by a Chinese gang warlord calling himself Lord Remaker. He commanded numerous triads which protected the city from anyone who wanted to interfere. However, he was stripped from his power when Tony Stark decided to rebuild the city into a futuristic utopia. Upon obtaining the "Remaker" ring, Lord Remaker became Mandarin-One.
- Colin Sixty was part of the clone output created by A.I.M. He was created specifically to be sold to Cortex Inc. As "C. Anderson Sixty", Colin Sixty was put under the charge of the regional direction of Cortex Inc.'s Lunar operations in Tranquility Gulch. When Tony Stark, the governor of Tranquility Gulch went on a quest to kick out major competitors in the exploitation of Phlogistone, he revealed Anderson Sixty's true nature to the press to discredit Cortex by having allied with A.I.M.. With his life ruined, Colin tried to kill Stark with a laser cutter; using his martial arts training, Stark disposed of Colin's weapon and maimed his hand in a tank of liquid nitrogen. He was found by Mandarin's Impact Ring and made Mandarin-Two.
- Alec Eiffel was a fascist who was chosen by Mandarin's Vortex Ring to be its host Mandarin-Three to help it and the other rings have revenge on Tony Stark.
- After reclaiming his kingdom Svartalfheim, Malekith the Accursed was approached by the Disintegration Beam Ring seeking a host, becoming Mandarin-Four. Malekith bent its will to his rather than letting it control his mind. Malekith begins a campaign to attack all other "Mandarins" and take their rings, desiring "the full set" before attacking Tony Stark. Though he is usually a foe of Thor and other magical beings, his opposition to Iron Man is rooted in the Dark Elves' traditional weakness towards iron.
- Victor Kohl is the black sheep of his family, being the only member of his family who did not go through Terrigenesis during the Inhumanity storyline. Victor was confronted by the Mandarin's Black Light Ring, which found him acceptable to be its wearer. With its power and still under the influence of alcohol, Victor attacked the Inhuman Nativity Center where Robert was apparently killed. Iron Man appeared to stop him and Victor had to flee after the Golden Avenger injured his shoulder with a laser. The ring teleported Victor to a safe place. While recovering, Victor underwent Terrigenesis, to his surprise. As soon as he resurfaced, Victor was found and confronted by Medusa. She showed to him the rest of the body of his father, which was destroyed during Victor's rampage in the Nativity Center. She also explained to Victor that he did not suffer from Terrigenesis, not because he did not have blood ties with his family, but because the level of exposure to the Terrigen Mists to activate the Terrigenesis in certain individuals can vary. She exiled Victor from the Inhumans for his actions. Victor blamed himself for what he did, but the ring managed to make him blame Tony Stark from not stopping him when he was rampaging drunk. The ring also suggested Victor's new nickname, the Exile. The Exile was also referred to as Mandarin-Five. He was later killed by Arno Stark.
- The White Light Ring approached Mole Man to help it and the other rings have revenge on Tony Stark, where he became Mandarin-Six.
- Abigail Burns is an English activist who believes the world needs to be saved from capitalism, corporate hegemony and the impotence of democracy for which among her activities she wrote columns. One night, the Fire Blast Ring approached her and decided she possessed the suitable will to become Mandarin-Seven and her mission was to "save the world from Tony Stark." Besides being referred to as Mandarin-Seven, Abigail calls herself "Red Peril".
- Marc Kumar was a freelancer P.R. and marketing expert who met Pepper Potts in Las Vegas, during Tony Stark's absence in space, while he was handling a drunk client at a party Pepper was attending. After dating for months, Marc proposed to Pepper in Scotland. From the stories Pepper told him about Stark, Marc came to the conclusion that he treated her badly, and grew resentful at Tony. He was approached by the Mento-Intensifier Ring to help get revenge on Tony Stark, where he became Mandarin-Eight.
- An unnamed Broadway director/composer/conductor was formerly in charge of a musical based on Iron Man's life called "The Man in the Iron Mask" which showed Tony Stark as a pervert. Under the orders of Stark himself, the director was replaced and he took it poorly. The Electro-Blast Ring latched onto an egotistical musical-theatre artist calling himself "The Lighting Conductor" and operated as Mandarin-Nine.
- The supervillain Endotherm was chosen by the Ice Blast Ring to become Mandarin-Ten and help to get revenge on Tony Stark. His ring was later stolen by Abigail Burns.

After Malekith beheaded Mandarin-One and Mandarin-Nine and cut off the hands of Mandarin-Six, the remaining six Mandarins joined forces to attack Malekith while Iron Man was mounting an assault on the Dark Elves. With Malekith defeated, the Mandarins initially contemplated continuing to work together due to Kumar's influence, but after Tony and Arno were able to use the four rings they had recovered already to form a 'Master Ring' that could control the others, as well as convincing the former Mandarin-Six to help them, most of the remaining Mandarins were defeated in a final assault; the only one to escape was Mole Man, who concluded that the rings had been more trouble than they were worth.

With all 10 rings now in custody, Iron Man realizes that Recorder 451's corpse had been transmitting an alien frequency that gave the rings sentience.

=== Killed by Punisher ===
Mandarin appears under the alias of Tem Borjigen when Baron Zemo selected him as the public face of the Hydra-occupied Bagalia in his plot to have the United Nations recognize Bagalia as an independent nation. As part of his revenge on Hydra for manipulating him during the "Secret Empire" storyline, the Punisher finds the Mandarin making a speech at the United Nations and kills him with a special bullet that can bypass the forcefield formed by Mandarin's rings.

== Powers and abilities ==
The Mandarin is a skilled athlete with substantial skill in the various martial arts. Through repeated practice, he has toughened all the striking surfaces of his body, especially his hands, which are covered with thick calluses. He is able to split Iron Man's magnetic-beam reinforced alloy armor with repeated blows. Additionally, he can survive years without food and water due to his martial arts ability, apparently sustaining himself purely via his mastery of chi; the precise degree of the Mandarin's martial arts powers has been the subject of multiple implied retcons by Marvel Comics.

The Mandarin is a scientific genius, skilled in various sciences and has made discoveries based on alien Makluan science.

The principal personal weapons of the Mandarin are the 10 rings which he wears on the fingers of both hands. The rings' operations cannot be explained by contemporary Earth science, but it is known that they served as near-limitless power sources for the warp-drive engines of the Makluan starship of Axonn-Karr. The Mandarin learned how to convert the rings to his personal uses and to make them respond to his mental commands. The fingers on which he wears each ring, and the known functions for which he uses each ring, are given below.

As of writer Kieron Gillen's tenure on Iron Man, new names have been revealed for some rings which the rings—apparently sentient—use to identify one another. The rings' sentience was later revealed to be a temporary power-up caused by contact with Recorder 451.

Digit	Left hand	Right hand
Little finger	Ice Blast/"Zero" The ring emits waves of intense cold and ice which can be used to trap opponents. The ring usually causes the moisture in the air in the path of its blast to turn to ice, and can lower an object's temperature to nearly absolute zero. The gem is shaped like multiple small cylindrical capsules, colored blue-white.	Black Light/"Nightbringer" The ring can create an area of total darkness that absorbs light in its vicinity. The gem is shaped like four black-blue dots, arranged in a square shape in groups of two.
Ring finger	Mento-Intensifier/"The Liar" The ring magnifies the wearer's own psionic energy, allowing them to manipulate the thoughts and actions of others. This ability is most frequently used to create illusions, capable of affecting all five senses. The gem is shaped like a blue diamond.	Disintegration Beam/"Spectral" The ring emits a beam of energy that destroys bonds between atoms and molecules, causing them to disintegrate. This ring needs twenty minutes to recharge after use. The gem is shaped like a golden square.
Middle finger	Electro-Blast/"Lightning" The ring emits blasts of electricity in amounts and intensities mentally determined by the wearer. The gem is shaped like an angled green line.	Vortex Beam/"Spin" The ring causes the air to move about at high speed in a vortex. The vortex can be used offensively, as a means of levitating objects, or as a means of propelling the wearer through the air. The gem is shaped like a simple blue circle.
Index finger	Flame Blast/"Incandescence" The ring emits infrared radiation or heat at intensities mentally determined by the wearer. The gem is shaped similarly to the ice blast ring, but with four capsules and a red color.	Impact Beam/"Influence" This ring can emit various forms of energy, most frequently that of fast neutrons with great concussive force. The ring can also project intense sonic vibrations and create magnetic waves to attract or repel objects. The gem is shaped like a star, colored purple (or red).
Thumb	White Light/"Daimonic" This ring can emit various forms of energy in the electromagnetic spectrum. It can generate intense light to blind opponents, use magnetic fields to levitate objects, use holograms to confuse opponents, and intensify the effects of gravity. The gem is shaped like two white circles, set in gold.	Matter Rearranger/"Remaker" This ring can rearrange the atoms and molecules of a substance, but is unable to transmute elements. The ring has been used to condense water vapor to liquid water, solidify gases, create lethal poison gas, turn men to stone or into a beetle, change a mountain into a rock monster, erupt stone hands from the floor, rearrange costumes, and transform a man's body into a younger duplicate of the Mandarin. The gem is shaped like a small purple circle.

Over the years through mental discipline achieved through meditation and long practice in use of the rings, the Mandarin has established a strong psionic link with his 10 rings, which was made many times stronger during the period in which his mind/spirit inhabited them. One result is that no one who wears the rings other than the Mandarin himself can command them without his permission. The Mandarin can now command the rings even when they are separated from him by vast distances. He can mentally monitor events taking place near a ring that has been separated from him. Continued exposure to the alien rings made his hands green and scaly. He can voluntarily give temporary control over a ring to his servants. If the servant dies or falls unconscious, the ring teleports back to the Mandarin. Conversely, if the Mandarin himself is knocked out, all the rings automatically return to him. On one occasion, this left the Mandarin's servants powerless to stop some of Tony Stark's employees that the Mandarin had kidnapped from escaping.

The Mandarin has also used a force-field generator, but this is not part of his standard weaponry.

He has also used a headband enabling him to transfer his mind into his rings or into another's body and a teleportation device hidden on his person, both examples of Makluan technology.

The Mandarin is a brilliant and brutal tactician and a gifted strategist. He also abides by a very strict code of honor. When he attempted to stop Stark Enterprises from establishing itself in Hong Kong, the Mandarin challenged Iron Man to a duel, stating that if he won, he would take control of Stark Enterprises' Hong Kong operations, and that he would cease hindering Stark's activities if he lost. When Iron Man defeated him in fair combat, he lived up to his end of the agreement. On another occasion, he killed one of his minions for attempting to drug him during a practice session, angry that one of his students would use such dishonorable tactics.

== Reception ==
In 2009, The Mandarin was ranked as IGN's 81st-greatest comic book villain of all time.

== Other versions ==
Various alternate versions of Mandarin have appeared throughout the character's publication history. In Heroes Reborn, Mandarin is a robotic minion of Doctor Doom. In Secret Wars, elements of the Mandarin are incorporated into an alternate version of Zheng Zu.

== In other media ==
=== Television ===
- The Mandarin appears in The Marvel Super Heroes, voiced by Henry Ramer.
- The Mandarin appears in Iron Man (1994), voiced by Ed Gilbert in the first season and Robert Ito in the second. This version is Arnold "Arno" Brock, an archaeologist who encountered a buried alien spaceship and forged the gems inside it into rings to harness their powers. After battling Iron Man and Force Works throughout the first season, the Mandarin loses his rings and spends most of the second season traveling the world to reclaim them. He eventually succeeds, but is defeated by Iron Man and rendered amnesiac before mountain bandits kill him and obtain his rings.
- Several characters based on the Mandarin appear in Iron Man: Armored Adventures, voiced by Vincent Tong. Users of the identity wield the Makluan Rings, which in addition to imbuing them with various powers, allow them to don samurai-like armor that grants superhuman strength and durability. Additionally, the original Mandarin (Genghis Khan) scattered them around the world years prior and employed Makluan Guardians to test potential successors.
  - The primary incarnation is Gene Khan, a descendant of the original Mandarin who is part Makluan due to genetic modifications he inherited from his ancestor. After obtaining the rings, he helps Iron Man and Earth's heroes repel a Makluan invasion before disappearing.
  - Xin "Shin" Zhang is Gene's stepfather and head of the Tong crime organization who initially claimed to be the "true Mandarin" before Gene imprisons him and disposes of him off-screen.
- The Mandarin appears in Lego Marvel Super Heroes: Maximum Overload, voiced by Barry Dennen.
- The Mandarin appears in Marvel Disk Wars: The Avengers, voiced by Taiten Kusunoki in Japanese and Jamieson Price in English.

=== Film ===
The Mandarin appears in The Invincible Iron Man, voiced by Fred Tatasciore. This version is an ancient ruler of a Chinese dynasty who was served by two dragons, Fin Fang Foom and Zhen Ji Xang, before being defeated and losing his rings, which were scattered around the world. In the present, his descendant Li-Mei gathers the rings and uses their power, allowing him to project his spirit through her. However, they are eventually defeated by Iron Man.

=== Marvel Cinematic Universe ===
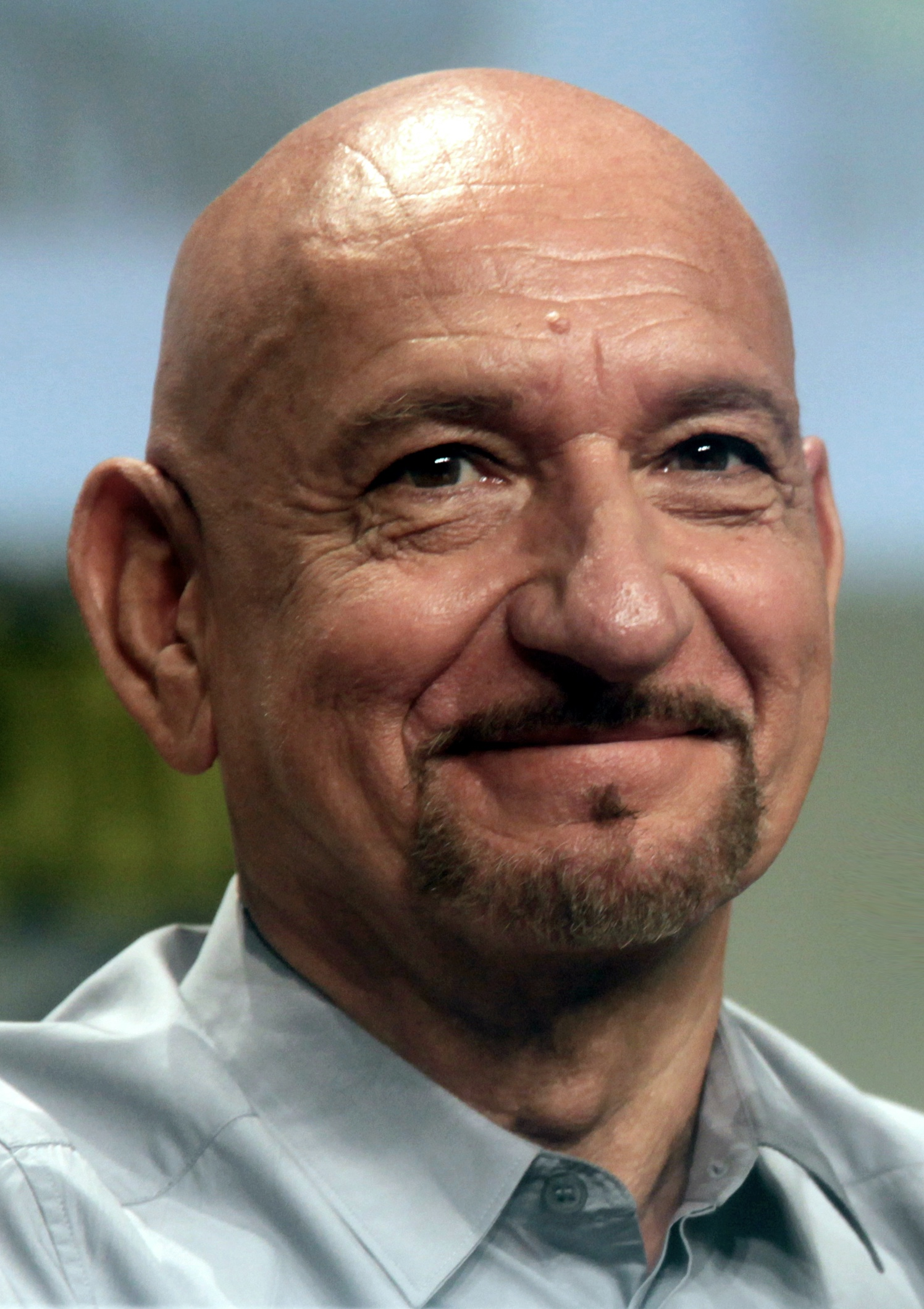
Ben Kingsley at the 2014 San Diego Comic-Con

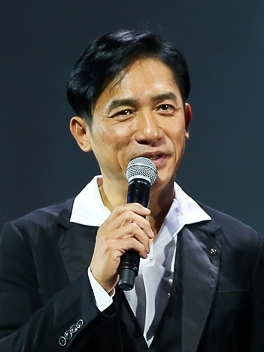
Tony Leung in 2016

Several variations of the Mandarin concept appear in media set in the Marvel Cinematic Universe (MCU):

- The Mandarin is indirectly referenced via a terrorist group called the Ten Rings in the live-action films Iron Man (2008), Iron Man 2 (2010), and Ant-Man (2015).
- The Mandarin appears in the live-action film Iron Man 3 (2013) as a terrorist persona portrayed by British actor Trevor Slattery (portrayed by Ben Kingsley), who serves as the idealized image of Aldrich Killian (portrayed by Guy Pearce) to mask his illegal activities involving the Extremis virus and Advanced Idea Mechanics. Killian also claims the name of The Mandarin for himself in the film.
  - Slattery also appears in the live-action Marvel One-Shot All Hail the King (2014), the film Shang-Chi and the Legend of the Ten Rings (see below), and the series Wonder Man (2026–present).
- The Mandarin himself appears in the live-action film Shang-Chi and the Legend of the Ten Rings (2021), portrayed by Tony Leung. This version is Xu Wenwu, the Ten Rings' leader and father of Shang-Chi and Xialing, who discovered the Ten Rings, a set of powerful iron rings, and used their power to become an immortal warlord. After acquiring the rings, he named his organization the Ten Rings. though he never used the Mandarin name for himself.
- Alternate timeline variants of Wenwu appear in the animated Disney+ series What If...? (2023) and Marvel Zombies (2025), voiced by Feodor Chin.

=== Video games ===
- The Mandarin appears as a boss in Captain America and the Avengers.
- The Mandarin appears as a boss in Marvel Ultimate Alliance, voiced by James Sie. This version was originally a member of Doctor Doom's Masters of Evil until he launched a failed rebellion against him and left the group. Loki later poses as the Mandarin to steal the Tome of Asarius from Atlantis.
- The Mandarin appears in Marvel Pinball.
- The Mandarin appears as a boss in Marvel Avengers Alliance.
- The Mandarin appears as a boss in Marvel Heroes, voiced again by Fred Tatasciore.
- The Mandarin appears as a boss and an unlockable playable character in Lego Marvel Super Heroes, voiced by John DiMaggio. He and Aldrich Killian lead Extremis soldiers in taking over Stark Tower. After Killian is defeated, the Mandarin hijacks Iron Man's Hulkbuster Armor to fight Iron Man and Captain America, but is defeated and arrested by S.H.I.E.L.D.
- The Mandarin appears as an unlockable playable character in Lego Marvel's Avengers.
- The Mandarin appears as an unlockable playable character in Marvel Avengers Academy.
- Wenwu appears as an unlockable playable character in Marvel Future Fight.
- Wenwu appears as an unlockable playable character in Marvel Super War, voiced by Aleks Le.

=== Merchandise ===
- The Mandarin received a figurine in the Classic Marvel Figurine Collection.
- The Mandarin received two figures, one in red and one in green, in Toy Biz's 6" Marvel Legends Face-Off line as part of two-packs with Iron Man and War Machine respectively.
- The Mandarin, based on his appearance in Iron Man (1994), received a figure in Toy Biz's Iron Man line.
- The Mandarin, based on the Iron Man: Armored Adventures incarnation, received a figure in Hasbro's 3.75" figure line.
- The Mandarin, under the name "Zhang Tong", received a figure in the Marvel Super Hero Squad line as part of The Danger of Dreadknight four-pack alongside two figures of Iron Man and one of Dreadknight.
- The Mandarin received a figure in the Marvel Minimates line.
- The Mandarin received a figure in Hasbro's 3.75" Iron Man 2 tie-in line. Additionally, a red version came out in a Marvel Universe comic pack with Iron Man's Silver Centurion armor.
- The Mandarin received mini-figures in two of Lego's Marvel Super Heroes sets, "Iron Man: Malibu Mansion Attack" and "Iron Man vs. the Mandarin: Ultimate Showdown".
- The Mandarin received a series of figurines in the HeroClix line.
- Xu Wenwu received mini-figures in Lego's "Escape from the Ten Rings" and "Battle at the Ancient Village" sets.
