= Captain Ultra =

Marvel Comics fictional character

- Captain Ultra

Publication information
- Publisher: Marvel Comics
- First appearance: Fantastic Four #177 (December 1976)
- Created by: Roy Thomas (writer); George Pérez (artist)

In-story information
- Alter ego: Griffin "Griff" Gogol
- Species: Human mutate
- Team affiliations: Revengers; Defenders; Initiative
- Notable aliases: Captain Ultra
- Abilities: Superhuman strength, speed, stamina, and durability; Super breath; Intangibility; Ultra-voice; Flight

Captain Ultra (Griffin Gogol) is a superhero appearing in American comic books published by Marvel Comics. Created by Roy Thomas, George Pérez, and Joe Sinnott, the character first appeared in Fantastic Four #177 (December 1976). Captain Ultra has been a member of the Revengers at various points in his history.

== Development ==
=== Concept and creation ===
Roy Thomas asserted, "Captain Ultra was a parody character that George Perez and I made up for FF #177, in our own spoof of DC's auditions for the Legion of Super-Heroes (it had that quasi-legion of rejected heroes, remember?). We deliberately gave him what I've always called a "church-window" costume... one that has a zillion design pieces, and nearly as many colors, with nothing to really focus the eye. But of course, since he was a virtual Superman, we had to give him a "Kryptonite," so we made it fire, as a sort of homage to the Martian Manhunter. The joke was that the Frightful Four, if they had let him join, would have been going up against the Fantastic Four--with its Human Torch--aided by a man who passed out in the presence of any kind of flame."

=== Publication history ===
Captain Ultra debuted in Fantastic Four #177 (December 1976), and was created by Roy Thomas, George Pérez, and Joe Sinnott.

== Fictional character biography ==
Griffin Gogol is a plumber who underwent psychological treatment and hypnosis to cure his smoking habits. Unbeknownst to him, his psychologist is an alien, and the hypnosis unlocks his innate superhuman abilities. Donning a clashing, colorful costume, Gogol became the superhero Captain Ultra. However, it is revealed he suffers from severe pyrophobia (fear of fire) as a side-effect.

Captain Ultra subsequently applies to join the Frightful Four. They eagerly accept him, but reject him after he faints in the presence of a match. Ultra also works with the Defenders in New York, but never considers joining them.

Soon after, he moves to Chicago. He has since had a minor career as a solo superhero, often teaming up with heroes like Thor to battle minor villains.

Ultra overcomes his pyrophobia after undergoing therapy with Doc Samson and becomes a comedian. His comedy career takes him across the country. Superheroics interfere with this, such as when the underground dirt creature Mud Pi kidnaps the citizens of Wash Basin, Texas. Captain Ultra manages to rescue them all.

Captain Ultra becomes the leader for the Nebraska team of the Initiative program, part of a government-controlled superhero program. After his teammates Paragon and Gadget are killed, Captain Ultra briefly fights Iron Man to protect the rest of his group. He is seen investigating the circumstances of Paragon and Gadget's deaths with Samson and Iron Man. During their investigation, it is revealed that there are two new Initiative recruits in the process of being fast-tracked to the Nebraska team, although Captain Ultra expresses irritation at the prospect of having to "babysit the punks".

Captain Ultra is recruited by Wonder Man to join his Revengers. During the Revengers' attack on Avengers Mansion, he is scared off when Doctor Strange uses an illusion spell to make him believe he is on fire. He and the rest of the Revengers are defeated by all three Avengers teams and remanded to the Raft. It is revealed that Captain Ultra joined the Revengers because he resents being disrespected despite having as much power as an Avenger.

== Powers and abilities ==
Captain Ultra acquired a range of superpowers through hypnosis by an alien. He possesses superhuman attributes, such as superhuman strength, speed, durability, and stamina. He also gained the psionic ability to become intangible at will, see through substances (X-ray vision), and the ability to project his breath forward with great concussive force — among others. Captain Ultra has the power of flight.

== Reception ==
=== Critical response ===
Daniel Jurlan of Comic Book Resources ranked Captain Ultra 4th in their "15 Obscure Marvel Characters Who Deserve Their Own Movie" list.

== In other media ==
- Captain Ultra appears in the Fantastic Four: World's Greatest Heroes episode "The Cure", voiced by Paul Dobson. This version is a failed applicant to the Fantastic Four.
- Captain Ultra appears in the Ultimate Spider-Man episode "Damage", voiced by Cam Clarke. This version is a spokesperson for Damage Control.
