= Goliath (Marvel Comics) =

Fictional superhero identity

Publication information
- Publisher: Marvel Comics
- First appearance: The Avengers #28 (May 1966)
- Created by: Stan Lee; Don Heck

In-story information
- Alter ego: Hank Pym; Clint Barton; Bill Foster; Erik Josten; Tom Foster
- Team affiliations: Avengers
- Abilities: Size-shifting from nearly microscopic to ~100 feet gigantic (both at extremes); Superhuman strength

Goliath is a superhero comic book identity in Marvel Comics.

== Character history ==
The Goliath identity has been used by various superheroes:

=== Henry Pym ===
Henry "Hank" Pym was the first to utilize the Goliath name.

=== Clint Barton ===
Clinton "Clint" Barton, better known as the superhero Hawkeye, used the Pym size-changing gas to adopt the Goliath powers and identity shortly after Hank Pym was Yellowjacket. He remained Goliath through the Kree-Skrull War, and briefly resumed the identity during "Operation: Galactic Storm".

=== Bill Foster ===
Dr. William "Bill" Foster was Pym's lab assistant who had an equally brief career as the Black Goliath and Giant-Man before retiring from superheroics. He later came out of retirement, donning a new costume as Goliath. In the Civil War storyline, Foster sided with Captain America's faction of outlaw Anti-Registration heroes, and was killed by Ragnarok.

=== Erik Josten ===
Erik Josten was originally known as the supervillain Power Man. After being defeated by Luke Cage – who was also known as Power Man at the time – he changed his codename to Smuggler and later Goliath. He adopted the superhero identity Atlas upon joining the Thunderbolts.

=== Criti Noll ===
The Skrull Criti Noll utilized the abilities of Goliath while impersonating Hank Pym for the Secret Invasion storyline.

=== Tom Foster ===
Tom Foster is Bill Foster's nephew. Created by Reginald Hudlin, Greg Pak and Koi Turnbull, he first appears in Black Panther (vol. 4) #23 (February 2007), and in World War Hulk: Aftersmash #1 (March 2008) as Goliath. According to Pak, Tom was created as a replacement for Bill Foster after the character was killed off.

After learning of Bill's death from Black Panther, Tom swore to continue his uncle's legacy by replicating the Pym Particles that gave him his powers. To this end, T'Challa swore to assist him in any way possible, once Tom finished his M.I.T. studies.

Tom sneaks into the Avengers Mansion's abandoned labs, locating a vial of Pym Particles, which he uses to gain superpowers as Goliath. Upon doing so, he finds and assaults Iron Man in retaliation for his uncle's death, but is interrupted by an internal struggle between the captured Warbound and does not continue the attack. He then assists Damage Control in repairing the city.

Goliath later joins a team of anti-heroes assembled by Wonder Man (whose judgement was impaired at the time) to defeat the Avengers. He and the group are defeated by the Avengers and remanded to the Raft.

=== Goliaths ===
The Ultimate Marvel universe features the Goliaths, a group of African-American men who have size-shifting powers and special jumpsuits that can grow with them. They are reserve members of S.H.I.E.L.D. alongside the Giant-Men and Giant-Women.

== In other media ==
=== Television ===
- The Hank Pym incarnation of Goliath makes a non-speaking appearance in the X-Men: The Animated Series episode "One Man's Worth (Part 1)".
- The Clint Barton incarnation of Goliath makes a cameo appearance in the Fantastic Four episode "To Battle the Living Planet".
- The Clint Barton and Erik Josten incarnations of Goliath appear in Avengers Assemble, voiced by Troy Baker and Jesse Burch respectively.
- The Bill Foster incarnation of Goliath appears in What If...?, voiced by Laurence Fishburne.

=== Video games ===
- The Erik Josten incarnation of Goliath appears in Iron Man and X-O Manowar in Heavy Metal.
- The Bill Foster incarnation of Goliath appears as a boss in Marvel: Ultimate Alliance 2, voiced by Emerson Brooks.
- The Bill Foster incarnation of Goliath appears as a playable character in Marvel Super Hero Squad Online.
- The Hank Pym incarnation of Goliath appears as an alternate skin for Hank Pym in Marvel: Future Fight.
- Bill Foster / Black Goliath appears as a playable character in Lego Marvel's Avengers, voiced by James C. Mathis III.
