= Paragon (Marvel Comics) =

Paragon is the name of two unrelated characters appearing in comic books published by Marvel Comics.

== Fictional character biography ==
=== Paragon (Cooper Roth) ===
Paragon

Publication information
- Publisher: Marvel Comics
- First appearance: The Invincible Iron Man #21 (August 2007)
- Created by: Marvel Comics

In-story information
- Alter ego: Cooper Roth
- Team affiliations: Fifty State Initiative
- Abilities: Flight; Density manipulation; Superhuman strength, durability, and speed

Paragon (Cooper Roth) is a member of the Initiative and part of Captain Ultra's team. After investigating an unsolved crime with teammate Gadget, Paragon encounters the supervillain Graviton, who injures him and kills Gadget. After an investigation uncovers evidence implicating Paragon in the death of Gadget, Iron Man confronts him. Soon afterward, it is revealed that Paragon was under the influence of the Mandarin, who manipulates him into believing that Graviton killed his mother. Paragon attempts to assassinate Graviton, who instead kills him.

==== Powers and abilities ====
Paragon is able to manipulate his own density, which gives him superhuman strength, durability, speed, and the capability of flight.
