= Revengers =

Fictional group in Marvel Comics canon

The Revengers is the name of four teams appearing in American comic books published by Marvel Comics.

== Publication history ==
The Revengers is a team of supervillains who were formed to fight A-Next in the MC2 series A-Next. They were created by Tom DeFalco and Ron Frenz.

The Revengers is also the name of the Avengers in Earth-665, the setting of Marvel's parody comic Not Brand Echh.

In September 2011, an Earth-616 version of the Revengers led by Wonder Man appears. They were created by Brian Michael Bendis.

== Fictional team history ==
=== MC2 ===
The Revengers

Publication information
- Publisher: Marvel Comics
- First appearance: A-Next #12 (July 1999)
- Created by: Tom DeFalco; Ron Frenz

In-story information
- Base(s): mobile

In a possible future depicted in Marvel Comics 2, wherein several Avengers were killed while on a mission and A-Next was formed to replace them, Hank Pym and the Wasp's children Hope Pym and Henry use their parents' technology to replicate their powers to oppose A-Next, with Hope becoming the Red Queen and Henry Big Man. Additionally, Hope creates the energy-based villain Ion Man and recruits supervillains Killerwatt and Sabreclaw to help them form the Revengers before she and Henry lead them in attacking surviving Avengers. However, A-Next's reserve members defeat the Revengers, with Henry turning himself in and helping defeat Hope.

As of Last Planet Standing, the Revengers have replaced Henry with Magneta and resumed their fight with A-Next until Galactus arrives to destroy Earth. Most of the Revengers escape, though Sabreclaw defects to A-Next to help them fight Galactus.

=== Cancerverse ===
In the Cancerverse, the Revengers originally existed as their reality's Avengers before they were corrupted by their version of Captain Marvel, who turned them into servants of the Many-Angled Ones. They are later destroyed by Thanos and Death.

=== Earth-616 ===
The Revengers

Publication information
- Publisher: Marvel Comics
- First appearance: New Avengers Annual #1 (Sept. 2011)
- Created by: Brian Michael Bendis

In-story information
- Member(s): Wonder Man; Anti-Venom; Atlas; Captain Ultra; Century; Demolition Man; Devil-Slayer; Ethan Edwards; Goliath V

In Earth-616, the Revengers exists as an antihero group formed and led by Wonder Man and consisting of Anti-Venom, Atlas, Captain Ultra, Century, Demolition Man, Devil-Slayer, Ethan Edwards, and Goliath. Due to his powers making him believe that the Avengers are not helping the world, Wonder Man forms the Revengers to stop them. In pursuit of his goal, he leads the group in attacking Avengers Mansion and Stark Tower and defeat the New Avengers. However, Iron Man traps Wonder Man in a stasis container before Thor teleports the Revengers to Citi Field to minimize casualties. There, the Avengers, New Avengers, and Secret Avengers defeat the Revengers, who are imprisoned in the Raft.

==== New Revengers ====
In New Avengers vol. 4, the Maker forms the New Revengers to battle the eponymous New Avengers, initially recruiting Asti the All-Seeing, Paibok, Vermin, White Tiger, alternate universe variants of Angar the Screamer and Skar, and O.M.N.I.T.R.O.C.U.S. Amidst a battle between A.I.M. and S.H.I.E.L.D., the Maker sends the New Revengers to attack the former and the New Avengers. However, Toni Ho kills Skar while A.I.M. and the New Avengers defeat most of the New Revengers, though the Maker escapes.

== Roster ==
=== MC2 version ===
- Ion Man - An ionic energy-powered villain created by the Red Queen who can fly and fire destructive energy blasts.
- Killerwatt - An electricity-powered enemy of Spider-Girl.
- Magneta - An obsessed fan of Magneto who possesses similar powers as him and abandoned her dreams of becoming a hero to help the Red Queen fight A-Next.
- Red Queen - The daughter of Hank Pym and the Wasp and the leader of the Revengers who used technology to copy her mother's electric blasts and wings.

==== Former members ====
- Sabreclaw - The sociopathic son of Wolverine and half-brother of Wild Thing who possesses a healing factor and sharp claws. After helping found the Revengers, he would later defect to A-Next.
- Big Man - The brother of Red Queen and son of Hank Pym and the Wasp who used technology to copy his father's size-shifting abilities. He helps found the Revengers to watch over the Red Queen before helping A-Next stop her.

=== Earth-616 version ===
- Wonder Man - The leader who possesses ionic energy-based powers.
- Anti-Venom - A symbiote-empowered vigilante who believes Wonder Man's claims about the Avengers.
- Atlas - A mercenary with size-shifting powers who joined the Revengers out of anger towards being denied membership into the Fifty State Initiative.
- Captain Ultra - A former plumber and member of the Fifty State Initiative who joined the Revengers out of resentment towards being disrespected despite his powers.
- Century - A Hodomurian who joins Wonder Man out of a sense of honor towards him and a desire to make amends for contributing to his death.
- Demolition Man - A former professional wrestler who joins the Revengers under the brain damage-induced belief that the Grandmaster tasked him with reclaiming the Infinity Gems from the Avengers.
- Devil-Slayer - A mystically-powered vigilante who joins the Revengers to create a reality where the Avengers are held accountable for their actions.
- Ethan Edwards - A Skrull who joined the Revengers to avenge his people's defeat during Secret Invasion.
- Goliath - The nephew of Bill Foster who also possesses size-shifting powers and joined the Revengers to seek revenge on Iron Man for contributing to his uncle's death.

=== New Revengers membership ===
- Maker - A version of Reed Richards from Earth-1610.
- White Tiger - Angela Del Toro with the Amulet of Power from Earth-41563.
- Paibok - A version of Paibok from Earth-39574.
- Asti the All-Seeing - servant of Dormammu.
- Skar - A version of Skar from Earth-61425.
- Angar the Screamer - A version of Angar from Earth-13167.
- Vermin - geneticist Transformed into a cannibalistic, humanoid rat.
- O.M.N.I.T.R.O.C.U.S (Organo-Mechanic Nexus-Iterated Techno-Radical Organizational Networked Intelligent Computer Unity System) - A flamboyant Earth-616 attempt at recreating the Earth-1610 artificial intelligence named City.

== In other media ==
- The Revengers appear in the Avengers Assemble episode "Ant-Man Makes It Big". This version of the group are in-universe parodies of the Avengers, star in the film Human Ant and the Revengers, and consist of the Human Ant, Iron Guy, Colonel America, the Bulk, Dark Spider, and the Viking King.
- A group loosely inspired by and named after the Revengers appear in the Marvel Cinematic Universe (MCU) film Thor: Ragnarok, led by Thor and consisting of Valkyrie, Bruce Banner / Hulk, Loki, Heimdall, Korg, and Miek. This version of the group was formed by Thor to help him escape Sakaar and return to Asgard to fight Hela before he disbands it.
- The MCU incarnation of the Revengers appear in the Loki episode "Glorious Purpose" via archival footage.
