= Ethan Edwards =

- Cover art for Marvel Knights Spider-Man #18. Art by Steve McNiven.

Publication information
- Publisher: Marvel Comics
- First appearance: Marvel Knights Spider-Man #13 (June 2005)
- Created by: Reginald Hudlin (writer); Billy Tan (artist)

In-story information
- Alter ego: Ethan T. Edwards
- Species: Skrull
- Team affiliations: Daily Bugle; Revengers
- Notable aliases: The Tiller, Moral Man, Virtue
- Abilities: Superhuman strength Flight; Energy projection Healing powers Shapeshifting; Invulnerability; Ability to see every frequency in the light spectrum

Ethan Edwards is a superhero appearing in American comic books published by Marvel Comics.

== Publication history ==
Ethan Edwards first appeared in Marvel Knights Spider-Man #13 and was created by Reginald Hudlin and Billy Tan.

== Fictional character biography ==
Ethan is a Skrull whose father created the Super-Skrull, and was sent to Earth to conquer it in the aftermath of the Skrull homeworld's destruction at the hands of Galactus. Shortly after arriving on Earth, he was discovered by a pair of farmers from Iowa, who decided that a miracle had occurred and that the child was given to them as a gift from God. Ethan is brought up with a strong moral background and is taught the value of hard work and humility. As an adult, Ethan begins working as a reporter at the Daily Bugle and battling crime as the superhero Moral Man. He soon comes into contact with fellow Bugle employee and New York City superhero Spider-Man.

Recognizing that he needs assistance in learning how to be a hero, Ethan approaches Peter for aid, with Peter reluctantly agreeing to take Ethan on as an 'apprentice'. To learn more about Ethan's powers, Spider-Man takes him to the Baxter Building, where Reed Richards of the Fantastic Four performs tests on Ethan to uncover the origin of his powers. Ethan is initially believed to be as strong as the Thing, but is overpowered by him in a later confrontation with the Fantastic Four.

After a fight, the press show up and Moral Man takes off to protect his identity, but the press manages to uncover his identity regardless. When the press surrounds him, Ethan returns to Iowa. The Fantastic Four later examine the ship Ethan arrived in when a bright yellow light comes out of it. It shines on Ethan, who begins speaking another language until the Thing smashes the ship into the atmosphere. When Ethan reawakens, he lashes out at the Fantastic Four, then begins to have a nervous breakdown before flying off, donning a new leather costume and brutally attacking Absorbing Man.

Back at the Daily Bugle, Ethan Edwards researches who and what the Skrull are, coming to think he is a "murderous Skrull". Confused and angry, he searches the Baxter Building for Reed Richards, but he is not home. When Spider-Man and the New Avengers arrive, a fight starts, but Aunt May tells Ethan that he is a good man. On Spider-Man's insistence, Ethan leaves to help others overseas.

Ethan later joins Wonder Man's team of Revengers under the name Virtue. He participates in the attack on the New Avengers. He and the rest of the Revengers are defeated by the Avengers. Ethan claims that he joined the team to avenge the Skrulls' defeat during the "Secret Invasion."

== Powers and abilities ==
Ethan Edwards' Skrull physiology allows him to shapeshift into virtually any form that he chooses. He also has superhuman strength, healing powers, energy projection, flight and the ability to see every frequency in the light spectrum, allowing him to see Sue Storm when she's invisible. He is also invulnerable, allowing him to withstand physical injuries. However, when battling the Thing, he was knocked unconscious.
