= Demolition Man (character) =

Marvel Comics superhero

Publication information
- Publisher: Marvel Comics
- First appearance: (As Dennis Dunphy); The Thing #28 (October 1985) (As Demolition-Man); Captain America #328 (April 1987)
- Created by: Mike Carlin (writer); Ron Wilson (artist)

In-story information
- Alter ego: Dennis Dunphy
- Species: Human mutate
- Team affiliations: Night People; Inuit Tribe; Unlimited Class Wrestling Federation; US Military (branch unknown); Revengers
- Partnerships: Captain America
- Notable aliases: Scourge of the Underworld; Demolition Dunphy; Demolition Man; D-Man
- Abilities: Superhuman strength, stamina and durability; Excellent hand to hand combatant; Skilled aircraft pilot

Dennis Dunphy is a character appearing in American comic books published by Marvel Comics. Created by writer Mike Carlin and artist Ron Wilson, the character first appeared in The Thing #28 (October 1985). Dunphy is a superhero known under the codenames D-Man, Demolition Man, and Scourge of the Underworld. He possesses superhuman strength, stamina, and durability, which he acquired through a drug provided by the Power Broker in an attempt to advance his football career.

Dunphy is primarily associated with Steve Rogers / Captain America, serving as Rogers' partner until he was presumed killed aboard an exploding Quinjet. He later resurfaced and sided with Captain America when he opposed the Superhuman Registration Act during the Civil War storyline.

Since his original introduction in comics, the character has been featured in various other Marvel-licensed products. Will Friedle voices the character in the Disney+ special LEGO Marvel Avengers: Mission Demolition (2024), while William McCullough portrays him in the Marvel Cinematic Universe film Captain America: Brave New World (2025).

== Development ==
=== Concept and creation ===
Captain America writer Mark Gruenwald explained his decision to make Demolition Man (or D-Man, as he was commonly referred to at the time) Captain America's newest partner, stating, "All of Cap's past partners – Bucky, Rick Jones, the Falcon and Nomad – have been less powerful than he is, so he was naturally the dominant figure in the partnership. But this new guy can lift ten tons, so he's no slouch in the power department and he's half a head taller than C.A., so there's a different kind of relationship with D-Man, as he's called."

=== Publication history ===
Dennis Dunphy debuted in The Thing #28 (October 1985), created by Mike Carlin and Ron Wilson. He first appeared as Demolition-Man in Captain America #328 (April 1987). He subsequently appeared in several Marvel series, including Captain America: The Legend (1996), Civil War: Battle Damage Report (2007), New Avengers (2010), and Marvel's Voices: Pride (2022).

== Fictional character biography ==
Dennis Dunphy was born in Lincoln, Nebraska. Dennis becomes an aspiring athlete who receives strength augmentation treatments offered by Power Broker, Inc. Finding himself too strong for normal sports, he becomes a professional wrestler and member of the Unlimited Class Wrestling Federation (UCWF). Dunphy later reveals his addiction to the Power Broker's drug to the Thing, and goes through a painful withdrawal when the Power Broker cuts off his drug supply.

After the fall of the UCWF, Dunphy becomes the Demolition Man and teams up with Captain America to investigate Power Broker, Inc. His costume is intentionally designed so the body of it is a duplicate of Daredevil's first costume, and the hood is a knock-off of Wolverine's. He successfully rescues Captain America from Karl Malus and helps Captain America catch him. Dunphy is captured by the Power Broker and is subjected to further treatments which augment his strength further but damage his heart. While under the influence of the stimulant, he goes mad and attacks Captain America. Dunphy suffers a heart attack, his second augmentation is reversed and he is hospitalized. Dunphy then takes a step back from superhero activity to take over Captain America's hotline.

Dunphy is arrested by the Commission on Superhuman Activities and held for questioning about Captain America's activities. After being released, he seeks out the Captain, discovering that not only had his team disbanded, but that the East Coast Avengers team had also just disbanded and that the Captain is seeking new members. The Captain asks Demolition Man to join the Avengers and they immediately leave on a mission at the request of Battlestar. Battlestar's partner is John Walker, Captain America's replacement, who was captured by Flag-Smasher and his group ULTIMATUM. While Battlestar and the Captain investigate ULTIMATUM's Arctic base, Demolition Man is left with their plane. During the fight, the Captain discovers that Flag-Smasher's base contains a doomsday weapon (an electromagnetic pulse generator), and he orders Dunphy to set the plane on course to crash into the base and then bail out. Demolition Man sets the course, but then sees an enemy agent land on the plane. Demolition Man elects to stay on the plane to ensure that it crashes. The plane explodes, apparently with Demolition Man in it, and Captain America is unable to find any trace of him.

Demolition Man survives the explosion, but suffers injuries that render him mute and in a stupor. During a backup story to "Operation: Galactic Storm", he is rescued by U.S. Agent and the Falcon and recovers under the Avengers' care.

During the Dark Reign storyline, D-Man is shown to be serving in the U.S. military in his civilian identity and covertly as Demolition Man. For a while, he inspires several of his fellow soldiers to operate covertly in costumes as well, but he puts a stop to it out of concern for their military careers.

Wonder Man recruits Demolition Man to join his Revengers. All three Avengers team defeat Demolition Man and the rest of the Revengers and they are remanded to the Raft. Demolition Man claims that the Grandmaster called him to reclaim the Infinity Gems from the Avengers and that the Avengers have not been returning his calls, leading him to be recruited into the Revengers.

A brainwashed Henry Peter Gyrich chooses Demolition Man to become the new Scourge of the Underworld. Captain America tracks down the new Scourge and the two engage in an intense fight. During the altercation, Captain America recognizes Demolition Man and pleads with him to stop fighting. Demolition Man accuses Captain America of making deals with villains and providing them with new lives instead of punishment, and he takes control of the brawl and Captain America's shield. As Demolition Man is about to strike the killing blow, Sharon Carter arrives and kills him.

During the Secret Wars storyline, Dennis is accidentally resurrected by a young sorcerer who mistakes the name "D-Man" for "demon". He visits Avengers Mansion and meets with Edwin Jarvis and Rage. Shortly afterward, Dennis is killed in the incursion between Earth-616 and Earth-1610.

After the eight-month ellipsis following Secret Wars, Demolition Man is seen as one of the partners of Sam Wilson (now the new Captain America). It is not explained how he returned, but Sam simply remarks "he's a survivor". As part of the All-New, All-Different Marvel publishing line, Dennis started working for Captain America as a pilot, mechanic, technician, and field backup. It is also revealed that he has a boyfriend, later revealed to be named Chris.

D-Man later founds a team and support group for young transgender mutants called "Super Trans".

== Powers and abilities ==
With his augmented physiology and regular exercise regimen, Dennis Dunphy possesses superhuman strength, capable of lifting up to 15 tons. He has undergone extensive training as a professional wrestler and later as a partner to Captain America. At one point, Dunphy's strength was pushed beyond what his heart could sustain, though it was later restored to its standard augmented levels. He is proficient in operating the Avengers Quinjet and is an experienced motorcycle rider. As D-Man, he was briefly infected by a modified symbiote, which granted him a yellow-and-brown symbiotic costume and further enhanced his strength. He was later infected by a Poison, which altered his appearance with a white exoskeleton and made him part of a hive mind. In a separate incident, D-Man was temporarily transformed into a dragon-like being capable of flight and breathing fire through a serum created by Doc Jaw.

== Other versions ==
- An alternate universe version of Demolition Man from Earth-18119 appears in Amazing Spider-Man: Renew Your Vows.
- A medieval-themed alternate universe version of Demolition Man created by Morgan le Fay appears in Avengers (vol. 3).

== Reception ==
Newsarama ranked Demolition Man as the ninth worst Avengers member, describing him as having "the power of pretty strong strength, constantly being confused for Wolverine and Daredevil, and as demonstrated in the first issue of Kurt Busiek and George Pérez's Avengers run smelling so awful that no one wants to get within 30 feet of him."

== In other media ==
- Demolition Man appears as a playable character in Lego Marvel's Avengers.
- Demolition Man appears in LEGO Marvel Avengers: Mission Demolition, voiced by Will Friedle. This version is a member of Damage Control and aspiring member of the Avengers.
- Dennis Dunphy appears in Captain America: Brave New World, portrayed by William McCullough. This version is a Navy SEAL commander and friend of Sam Wilson who is later killed by the Leader.
