= Paibok =

Marvel Comics fictional character

Publication information
- Publisher: Marvel Comics
- First appearance: Fantastic Four #358 (November 1991)
- Created by: Tom DeFalco; Paul Ryan; Danny Bulanadi

In-story information
- Species: Enhanced Skrull
- Team affiliations: Annihilation Wave; Fearsome Foursome; New Revengers
- Notable aliases: The Power Skrull; Paul Balk
- Abilities: Superhuman strength, stamina, durability, speed, and agility; Flight; Shapeshifting; Hypnotic gaze; Electric and ice projection; Metal mimicry

Paibok the Power Skrull is a supervillain appearing in American comic books published by Marvel Comics. He is a foe of the Fantastic Four.

== Publication history ==
Paibok's first appearance was in Fantastic Four #358 (November 1991); he was created by Tom DeFalco, Paul Ryan, and Danny Bulanadi.

== Fictional character biography ==
Paibok was born on the planet Tarnax IV, in the Tarnax System in the Andromeda Galaxy. His home planet was part of the Skrull Empire, but has since been destroyed. Paibok was trained at the Skrullian military academy, and became an espionage agent and captain in the Skrull armed forces.

=== Lyja and Alicia ===
The Skrull Empire seeks a way to defeat the Fantastic Four, who have handed them multiple defeats. Paibok suggests a subtle plan: replacing the Fantastic Four's associate Alicia Masters with Lyja, a Skrull spy and Paibok's former lover. Lyja successfully impersonates Alicia and the real Alicia is held prisoner by Paibok.

Eventually the Fantastic Four realize what had happened and come in search of Alicia. They confront Paibok on 'War World'. Paibok, now calling himself the "Power Skrull" after being augmented in a manner similar to the Super-Skrull, is prepared for the encounter and almost defeats the Fantastic Four and Lyja.

Lyja seemingly sacrifices her life to protect the Human Torch and the Thing finally defeats Paibok. He is left for dead, buried under fallen rubble.

=== The Fearsome Foursome ===
Paibok survives the battle and recovers Lyja's body. Seeking revenge on the Fantastic Four, he encounters Devos the Devastator, another alien who had clashed with them, and the two form an alliance. Devos is able to revive Lyja, and Paibok and Devos alter Lyja's genetic structure, granting her the power of flight and the ability to project lethal energy blasts. Together, the three travel to Earth to battle the Fantastic Four again.

Arriving on earth, the three attack the Human Torch in New York City, forcing him to attack them — a move which leads to his arrest for damage to the surroundings. A second attack aggravates the situation, leaving the Human Torch a fugitive from the police. Lyja later abandons Paibok and sides with the Fantastic Four. Undeterred, Paibok and Devos recruit new allies — Klaw and Huntara — and continue their attacks on the Fantastic Four, becoming known as the Fearsome Foursome. Eventually, they capture the Fantastic Four and return to the Skrull Throneworld to present them to the Empress.

Once on Throneworld, Paibok discovers that Devos is a wanted criminal and fugitive. Devos promptly summons his troops, takes personal command of his flagship (the Death Cruiser) and attempts to destroy Throneworld. The Empress blames Paibok for this and orders him killed. Paibok personally confronts Devos, with both being presumed dead when the ship is damaged and falls into subspace.

=== Freakshow ===
Paibok escapes from subspace and makes a deal with Centaurian scientists to enhance his powers. Still viewed as a traitor, he flees to Earth and assembles a band of Skrull renegades. Disguised as Paul Balk, the owner of a traveling freakshow, Paibok attempts to capture a young Watcher, which leads to him battling the Thing and a band of Kree. Paibok is captured by the Kree, who leave Earth shortly afterwards with him as their prisoner.

=== Earthfall ===
Paibok, Lunatik, and the Blood Brothers land in Alaska when the prison transport vessel Dredge 01 crashes on its way to the prison Kyln. Paibok takes command of the other survivors, intending to take control of the nearby town Coot's Bluff and use the population as slave labor — something which brought his renegades into conflict with the only other survivor of the crash, Drax the Destroyer.

Paibok and his allies defeat Drax, leaving him for dead. Drax recovers and hunts down Paibok's group, killing Lunatik and one of the Blood Brothers. Faced with death at the hands of a vengeful Drax, Paibok activates a distress beacon that he had secretly salvaged from the wreck, summoning another ship and allowing himself to be imprisoned.

=== Annihilation ===
Paibok later reappears fighting for Annihilus and his allies, as part of the Annihilation Wave. Following the death of Annihilus, the parasites injected into Paibok to force his obedience cease functioning. He briefly joins forces with Terrax and the Delinquent to kill Randau the Space Parasite, a being that had been slaughtering innocents. After the battle, which ends with the destruction of the planet by Terrax, he convinces the addled Delinquent to craft a spaceship. They return to what remains of the Skrull Empire.

=== All-New, All-Different Marvel ===
As part of All-New, All-Different Marvel, Paibok appears as a member of the Maker's New Revengers. After the Skrull and Kree empires end their war and form an alliance, Paibok becomes an ambassador to S.W.O.R.D.

== Powers and abilities ==
As a Skrull, Paibok possesses heightened physical malleability, an innate racial ability to shapeshift. He is a graduate from the Skrull military academy, as well as an expert in all forms of armed and unarmed combat. As the Power Skrull, Paibok has a set of additional powers due to bionic re-engineering. He also possesses immense physical abilities, supersonic flight, organic metal transformation, cryokinesis, electrokinesis, and hypnotism. Paibok wears body armor of unspecified materials.

== In other media ==
Paibok appears as a mini-boss in Marvel: Ultimate Alliance, voiced by Khary Payton.
