= Damage Control (comics) =

Fictional company appearing in Marvel Comics

- Damage Control #1 (May 1989). Art by Ernie Colón.

Publication information
- Publisher: Marvel Comics
- First appearance: Marvel Age Annual #4 (June 1988)
- Created by: Dwayne McDuffie (Writer); Ernie Colón (Artist)

In-story information
- Type of business: Construction
- Base(s): The Flatiron Building, New York City
- Owner(s): Anne Marie Hoag
- Employee(s): Lenny Ballinger; Robin Chapel; Albert Cleary; John Porter; Bart Rozum; Eugene Strasser; Ant-Man; Robbie Baldwin; Hercules; Walter Declun; Monstro; Tom Foster

Damage Control is a fictional construction company appearing in American comic books published by Marvel Comics. The company specializes in repairing the property damage caused by conflicts between superheroes and supervillains. Three Damage Control limited series have been published. Damage Control was created by writer Dwayne McDuffie and artist Ernie Colón, who worked on the first Damage Control series.

Damage Control has appeared in various media adaptations, including the Marvel Cinematic Universe (MCU) films Spider-Man: Homecoming (2017), Spider-Man: No Way Home (2021) and Spider-Man: Brand New Day (2026) and the MCU Disney+ television series Ms. Marvel (2022), She-Hulk: Attorney at Law (2022) and Wonder Man (2026).

== Publication history ==
Dwayne McDuffie, who co-created the concept with artist Ernie Colón and wrote Damage Control's initial stories, pitched Damage Control to Marvel as "a sitcom within the Marvel Universe".

Damage Control employees first appear in a five-page story, "The Sales Pitch", in 1988's Marvel Age Annual, and reappeared in 1989 in a serialized seven-page story published in the anthology comic Marvel Comics Presents #19. Subsequently, the employees of Damage Control have been the subject of three four-issue comic book limited series published between 1989 and 1991: Damage Control (May–August 1989) and Damage Control vol. 2 (December 1989 – February 1990, with two issues in December), both by writer McDuffie and penciler Colón, and vol. 3 (June–September 1991) by writer McDuffie and penciler and inker Kyle Baker.

Damage Control was featured in an entry in the Official Handbook of the Marvel Universe Update '89 #2.

Among its later appearances were those in the 2006 storyline "Civil War"; the series Irredeemable Ant-Man; and the first issue of World War Hulk Aftersmash: Damage Control, a three-issue limited series tying into the 2008 "World War Hulk" storyline.

== Fictional history ==
Damage Control was founded by Anne Marie Hoag and was originally owned by Tony Stark and Wilson Fisk, each owning half the stock of the company. However, Stark felt uneasy cooperating with Fisk, a notorious criminal. The company was headquartered in New York's Flatiron Building.

When Hoag was offered a job in government, she nominated Robin Chapel as her replacement. Stark and Fisk sold their stock in Damage Control: Stark because he did not want to be associated with Fisk and Fisk because he had no confidence in Robin's ability to lead the company. Another company, Carlton Co, took control of Damage Control and tried to make Damage Control more profitable, but in the process angered a lot of employees and nearly ruined Damage Control. Hoag convinced S.H.I.E.L.D. to invest in Damage Control and they loaned her the money to buy back the company. S.H.I.E.L.D. also found out that the sale of Damage Control had been a plot by Fisk to buy back the company for cheap. During the events of "Acts of Vengeance" (an event Fisk helped organize), massive damage was done to the city and Fisk made a large profit when Damage Control was hired to repair the damages.

The confrontation with the Kingpin causes unexpected results. The Damage Control staff find that a movie has been put out, a fictionalized version of their confrontation with the Kingpin. At the wrap party for the premiere, the Damage Control staff is summoned by the Silver Surfer to help deal with Edifice Rex, a former employee who gained cosmic powers. Several of the employees meet and discuss the problem with other cosmic entities, such as Galactus and Lord Chaos. Robin Chapel eventually solves this problem by firing Rex.

Hercules is seen working with Damage Control, on one occasion serving a community service sentence levied as punishment for a drunken rampage. Hercules becomes a full-fledged employee, forced to earn a living after the Constrictor sues him for injuries incurred in his apprehension.

The super-villain Nitro, who instigated the superhero civil war after destroying Stamford, reveals that Walter Declun provided him with Mutant Growth Hormone (MGH). Via Namor, Wolverine learns Declun that is the CEO of Damage Control. This leads Wolverine to Anne-Marie Hoag, Damage Control's president. Hoag had suspected Declun of illegal activities but did not have strong enough evidence to counter his ties with Washington, D.C., and the President. Wolverine confronts Declun, who empowers himself with MGH. During the fight Wolverine appears to kill Declun by stabbing him in the eyes. However, Declun survives the fight.

The company helped clean up New York City after the events of World War Hulk. Tom Foster, the nephew of Bill Foster and the new Goliath, joins the company, as do fellow superhumans Monstro and Visioneer. As a company, Damage Control secures all relevant resources and a makeshift superhero rescue force, as many people were left behind when New York was evacuated.

During the Spider-Island storyline, Damage Control is seen working with the superheroes to clean up the destruction caused by the Spider Queen. Damage Control provides clothing to many New Yorkers, who lost their clothing after being transformed into spider creatures. At least one Damage Control team was infiltrated by the Jackal, who wanted DNA from the spiders.

== Employees ==
=== Main characters ===
- Anne Marie Hoag: Founder, owner, and first director of Damage Control. She is good friends with then-S.H.I.E.L.D. director Nick Fury and convinced him that S.H.I.E.L.D. should loan her the money to buy Damage Control's stock.
- Hercules: Hercules previously did community service with Damage Control and became a regular employee for Damage Control after losing much of his wealth to a lawsuit from the villain Constrictor. Hercules works on construction and demolition.
- Robin Chapel: Traffic manager and Ms. Hoag's most trusted employee. She initially had a rivalry with John Porter, because he was hired to fill a position for which she had applied. Over time, the two became good friends, and by the time of the fourth series, they are romantically involved. Chapel is very capable and ambitious, but is a friendly person underneath her businesslike exterior. Temporarily thrown out by Walter Declun's manipulations, Chapel was later rehired as CEO of Damage Control.
- Albert Cleary: Comptroller, Cleary is a financial genius and always keeps a cool head, even when presenting bills to the likes of Doctor Doom. Cleary rejected a potential job from Doom, who respected his decision and allowed him to live.
- John Porter: Account executive, worked independently in "superhero insurance", but was offered a job by Ms. Hoag. He initially had a rivalry with Robin Chapel, but the two have become good friends and he has expressed a romantic interest in her. Porter has the ability to find peaceful, practical solutions to the most complicated problems.
- Bart Rozum: Former intern, offered a full-term contract as personal assistant to Robin Chapel. Infatuated with the receptionist Anne. He is named for Marvel Comics writer John Rozum. Rozum is a good friend of Robbie Baldwin, a former Damage Control employee.
- Eugene "Gene" Strausser: Technician, briefly became an armored supervillain when Damage Control's new board of directors fired him; with an ally, he even attacked She-Hulk. Was rehired when Ms. Hoag regained control. He served the required jail time for his misdeeds on a work-release basis, thanks to his "former boss", Nick Fury, pulling some strings on his behalf. Later, completely freed from his legal obligations to assist in the 'World War Hulk' damage.
- Trull the Unhuman: The essence of an alien in a steam shovel who became Damage Control's spokesperson.

==== Search and Rescue division ====
- Lenny Ballinger: Currently the leader of Damage Control's Search-and-Rescue division. He is a middle-aged man. Lenny's no-nonsense attitude has made him very popular with his crew. During a strike action, he even took their side in a strike against Carlton Co, who had offered him a large amount of money to do the opposite.
- Tom Foster / Goliath: Nephew of Bill Foster / Black Goliath. Joined Damage Control following World War Hulk.
- Frank Johnson / Monstro: A former firefighter who lived a nomadic life before joining the team.
- Abigail Dunton / Visioneer: She has low-level psychic abilities and assists in locating civilians trapped in rubble. She has a brief romantic relationship with Eric O'Grady.
- Eric O'Grady / Slaying Mantis: O'Grady was a member of the Search-And-Rescue team in the guise of Slaying Mantis. Damage Control had no knowledge that he was secretly Ant-Man.

=== Other employees ===
- Anne: Receptionist. A voluptuous, raven haired woman and the object of Bart's affection. She was initially an air-headed woman who spent her time talking to friends, but developed into a sarcastic, competent woman.
- Henry Ackerdson: Head of marketing. He was not very popular because of his idea that every employee should wear superhero costumes, but eventually accepted as part of the team.
- Robbie Baldwin / Speedball: Baldwin briefly worked as an intern for Damage Control.
- Walter Declun: A ruthless corporate raider who bought out controlling shares of Damage Control when it went public, he tried manipulating supervillains to increase property damage, and therefore Damage Control's workload and profits. Indirectly responsible for the Stamford Incident by giving Nitro a Mutant Growth Hormone. He ultimately had his shares bought out and was then immediately fired by Hoag (with Tony Stark's help) followed by Walter being impaled in the head by Wolverine's claws. In The Amazing Spider-Man Annual #1, it was revealed that Declun survived the attack. Declun has since resurfaced in the "Doomwar" limited series acting as a majordomo to Doctor Doom.
- Kirk Eden: Partner of Jim Palmetto. Assigned to the Bronx to report on any damage caused by the Ghost Rider.
- Gloria Clark: Personal liaison to Kid Kaiju following the events of Monsters Unleashed.
- Jay: Head of security.
- Marie Leahy: Account executive from Tokyo, Japan.
- Ray Lippert: Former representative of Carlton Co. who stayed with Damage Control after Carlton sold the company.
- Kathleen O'Meara: Vice-president, brief love interest for Ben Grimm.
- Jim Palmetto: Partner of Kirk Eden, assigned to the Bronx to report on any damage caused by the Ghost Rider.
- Vincent Patilio / Leap-Frog: Former super-villain who briefly was employed by Damage Control. Eugene Strausser made some improvements on the Leap-Frog suit.
- Rex Randolph / Edifice Rex: Former employee, who found an artifact that gave him cosmic powers. As the cosmic being Edifice Rex, Rex tried to clean up the universe by uncreating it, but was stopped by Robin Chapel, who fired him.
- Gus: A newly hired intern who kept getting moved from one job to the next. He had a habit of constantly eating, but never getting full. He gets fired due to the trouble he causes, only for Anne Marie Hoag to reveal that he is the son of Galactus and it was essential that he have a job.

== Other versions ==
In the Ultimate Marvel universe, Damage Control is also a construction and demolition company. The Ultimate version of the Wrecking Crew are employees of Damage Control, but quit the business to become villains.

== In other media ==
=== Film ===
In June 1999, Marvel Studios made a deal with Village Roadshow Pictures to develop a film based off Damage Control with Neal Moritz and Barry Levine producing. Levine's Brigade Entertainment was set to produce with a script written by Don Calame and Chris Conroy that was to also feature the Squadron Supreme in some capacity with hopes to make this Village Roadshow's answer to Men in Black. By March 2001, Marvel Studios executive Avi Arad revealed that the film had "fallen apart" at Village Roadshow.

=== Television ===
- Damage Control appears in The Super Hero Squad Show episode "Hulk Talk Smack!".
- Damage Control appears in the Ultimate Spider-Man episode "Damage". This version is led by Mac Porter, who is modeled after Damage Control creator Dwayne McDuffie.
- In October 2015, ABC ordered a pilot for the Marvel Television comedy series Damage Control, which was written, produced, and developed by Ben Karlin. The series had previously been implied by then ABC Entertainment president Paul Lee to have begun airing as early as the 2016–17 television season. However, since then, there have been no further announcements.
- Damage Control appears in LEGO Marvel Avengers: Mission Demolition, with Demolition Man as a member and Lenny Ballinger voiced by Kevin Michael Richardson.

=== Marvel Cinematic Universe ===
The U.S. Department of Damage Control (D.O.D.C.) appears in media set in the Marvel Cinematic Universe (MCU). This version is a government agency that was created as a joint venture between Stark Industries and the United States government following the Battle of New York.

=== Video games ===
- Damage Control workers appear in Lego Marvel Super Heroes.
- Damage Control workers appear in Lego Marvel's Avengers, with one such individual being a playable character, voiced by Nolan North.
- A Damage Control building appears in the Marvel's Spider-Man series.
- A virtual reality game called Avengers: Damage Control was released and hosted in select United States cities, Canada and Malaysia.

== Collected editions ==
Title	Material collected	Published date	ISBN
World War Hulk - Damage Control	World War Hulk Aftersmash: Damage Control #1-3, World War Hulk: Aftersmash	June 2008	978-0785123880
Damage Control: The Complete Collection	Damage Control (vol. 1) #1-4, Damage Control (vol. 2) #1-4, Damage Control (vol. 3) #1-4, World War Hulk Aftersmash: Damage Control #1-3, material from Marvel Age Annual #4, Marvel Comics Presents #19	October 2015	978-0785197904
