= Smuggler (character) =

Conrad Josten Smuggler

Publication information
- Publisher: Marvel Comics
- First appearance: Thunderbolts #16 (May 1998)
- Created by: Kurt Busiek; Mark Bagley

In-story information
- Alter ego: Conrad Josten
- Species: Human
- Team affiliations: Thunderbolts; Redeemers
- Notable aliases: Smuggler
- Abilities: Darkforce suit granting: Ability to create tendril-like grappling claws; Limb and extremities elongation; Portal generation

Conrad Josten is a superhero appearing in American comic books published by Marvel Comics. Created by writer Kurt Busiek and artist Mark Bagley, the character first appeared in Thunderbolts #16 (May 1998). Josten is known under the codename Smuggler. He wears a costume that grants him access to the Darkforce.

== Publication history ==
Conrad Josten debuted in Thunderbolts #16 (May 1998), created by Kurt Busiek and Mark Bagley. His first appeared as Smuggler was in issue #47 (February 2001).

== Fictional character biography ==
Conrad Josten is the youngest of the four Josten siblings, born to farmers living outside Madison, Wisconsin. Following the deaths of his siblings Carl and Lindy, Conrad's second oldest brother Erik becomes the supervillain Power Man. After Erik is arrested, the Josten family lose their farm, with Conrad's parents dying shortly afterwards from an illness. Conrad becomes estranged from Erik.

At the request of the Commission on Superhuman Activities, Conrad joins the Redeemers as Smuggler, utilizing a special suit that can harness the Darkforce. The group battles the Thunderbolts, with the Thunderbolts disbanding shortly afterward. The Redeemers assume control of the Thunderbolts' former base in Burton Canyon, Colorado.

Smuggler and the Redeemers are seemingly killed by Graviton. He survives by escaping into the Darkforce, but is trapped there. Helmut Zemo eventually discovered Smuggler's fate and gives an offer to Erik Josten to free him in exchange for killing Genis-Vell. Erik complies and Zemo frees Smuggler, who rejoins the Thunderbolts.

== Powers and abilities ==
The Smuggler wears a costume that enables him to manipulate energy from the Darkforce Dimension. He can reshape and elongate his body, conceal himself within shadows, and use them for teleportation. Furthermore, he is able to strangle victims using Darkforce energy drawn from their own shadows.
