= Atlas (Marvel Comics) =

Character name in US comics

Atlas is the name of different characters appearing in American comic books published by Marvel Comics. Erik Josten is the most notable of the known characters that used the name Atlas while another character is an adaptation of the Titan of the same name.

== Character history ==
=== Erik Josten ===
Erik Josten used the Atlas alias during his time as a member of the Thunderbolts.

=== Steve Rand ===
Steve Rand is an actor who is the star of a popular sword-and-sandals film. He was considered the most handsome actor in all of Hollywood. While working in the film Atlas and Bathsheba, Steve met his stunt double named Jimmy where Steve insisted on doing his own stunts like the one that involved him swinging over a flaming pit. Despite Jimmy's warnings, Steve went ahead with the stunt where it went horribly wrong where the accident disfigured him. Upon becoming delusional five years later, Steve Rand began to think he was Atlas and started targeting anyone that was involved in the production of Atlas and Bathsheba where he used the jawbone of a donkey to kill them. After killing five people, Atlas confronted the film's producer Simon Kolb. Upon unmasking himself to Kolb, Atlas killed him. Then he was attacked by Werewolf by Night and held his ground against him where he thought that Werewolf by Night was Jimmy and defeated him. After killing the leading lady for Atlas and Bathsheba, Atlas confronted the film's screenwriter Buck Cowan only to be confronted by Werewolf by Night where Atlas thought he was Jimmy. Their fight went from Hollywood Boulevard to Mann's Chinese Theatre. Before Atlas could kill Werewolf by Night, Buck used the gun Jack Russell gave him to shoot Atlas in the back causing him to fall face-first into the wet cement that an unidentified celebrity was going to put their hands in later on which led to Atlas' death.

=== Atlas (Titan) ===
Atlas is one of the Titans. He took a lesser goddess named Pleione as his wife. When it came to the Titanomachy, Atlas sided with his father Cronus in his fight against Zeus. While most of the Titans that were on Cronus' side were imprisoned in Tartarus, Atlas was condemned by Zeus to hold up the heavens. His location was at the Atlas Mountains in what would be Morocco. When Perseus neared his location after slaying Medusa, Atlas tried to warn Perseus to not take the apples of the Hesperides only for Perseus to use Medusa's head to turn him to stone. Atlas was restored to normal two generations later where he had his encounter with Hercules who asked for his help in obtaining the Golden Apples. While Atlas obtained the apples, he planned to leave Hercules to take over only for Hercules to trick Atlas into holding the clouds again.

The Axis Mundi that Atlas was positioned somehow shifted to Washington, D.C. as Atlas still held up the heavens. On September 18, 1793, Atlas appeared to George Washington when he made Washington, D.C. the capital of the United States of America. In the present, Artume freed Atlas from his fate using the Omphalus in exchange for revenge on Hercules. Using the Washington Monument, Atlas attacked Hercules only to be defeated by him and Namora.

=== Dallas Riordan ===
Erik Josten's ionic form later possessed Dallas Riordan which empowered her with the ionic energy, enabling her to operate as Atlas for a short time.
