= Julia Josten =

German television presenter

- Born: 4 December 1978 (age 47); Hamburg, Germany
- Occupation: Television presenter
- Years active: 2005–present
- Television: Sat.1 (2014–present)

Julia Josten (born 4 December 1978) is a German television presenter.

== Life and career ==
After graduating from high school with her Abitur in 1998, Julia Josten began her career as a business correspondent with a major in English and with Spanish as a secondary language.

She has been working as a television presenter since 2005. She began presenting trend and high society programs, and since 2009, she has been hosting news programs on ProSieben, N24, and n-tv. Since September 2014, she has co-hosted the entertainment program Gossip on Sat.1 with Florian Ambrosius.
