= Bill Foster (character) =

Superhero appearing in American comic books published by Marvel Comics

- Bill Foster as Black Goliath, appearing in Black Goliath #1 (Feb. 1976). Cover art by Rich Buckler.

Publication information
- Publisher: Marvel Comics
- First appearance: As Bill Foster: The Avengers #32 (September 1966); As Black Goliath: Luke Cage, Power Man #24 (April 1975); As Giant-Man: Marvel Two-in-One #55 (September 1979); As Goliath: The Thing (vol. 2) #1 (January 2006)
- Created by: Bill Foster: Stan Lee; Don Heck; Black Goliath: Jenny Blake Isabella; George Tuska

In-story information
- Alter ego: Dr. William Barrett "Bill" Foster
- Species: Human mutate
- Team affiliations: Centers for Disease Control; Project Pegasus; The Defenders; The Champions
- Notable aliases: Goliath; Black Goliath; Giant-Man; Rockwell Dodsworth
- Abilities: Brilliant biochemist; Mass manipulation; Superhuman strength and durability

Dr. William "Bill" Foster, also known as Black Goliath, Giant-Man and Goliath, is a superhero appearing in American comic books published by Marvel Comics. He is a professor with powers similar to Hank Pym's increasing size and mass to gigantic proportions. Foster was killed by Ragnarok during the 2006 event Civil War, with his nephew Tom Foster succeeding him as Goliath.

The character has made several video game appearances and appeared in the Marvel Cinematic Universe (MCU) film Ant-Man and the Wasp (2018), portrayed by Laurence Fishburne, who later voiced alternate versions of the character in the animated series What If...?.

== Creation ==
Isabella recounted the character's creation:

Bill Foster was Hank Pym's colleague at a time when Pym (aka Ant-Man, Giant-Man, and Goliath) was trapped at a giant size. They were working to reverse that condition. Later, Foster used their work to become a super-hero himself. I wanted to call him Giant-Man, but I was told Giant-Man had sold badly near the end of his run in Tales to Astonish. We went with Black Goliath to distinguish him from the Pym incarnation of Goliath, but I was never happy with that name.

== Publication history ==
Bill Foster was created by Stan Lee and Don Heck in The Avengers #32 (September 1966). His "Black Goliath" persona was created by Jenny Blake Isabella and George Tuska in Luke Cage, Power Man #24 (April 1975). Foster became the second Giant-Man in Marvel Two-in-One #55 (September 1979). He became yet the fourth Goliath in The Thing (vol. 2) #1 (January 2006).

He starred in the five-issue series Black Goliath in 1976.

Bill Foster has appeared in the pages of various comic books, including The Avengers, Power Man, Marvel Two-in-One, The Champions, The Defenders, Marvel Super-Heroes (vol. 3), Marvel Comics Presents, and Civil War.

Foster was killed by Ragnarok in the fourth issue of the series Civil War.

== Fictional character biography ==
=== Origin ===
Bill Foster was born in Watts, Los Angeles, California. After earning a Ph.D. in biochemistry from the California Institute of Technology (Caltech), Foster worked in the Plans and Research Division for Tony Stark's Baltimore factory. He is hired to be the biochemical laboratory assistant of Hank Pym. After Pym is stuck at the height of 10 feet (3.0 m), Foster helps at Stark's behest to find a cure to revert Pym's size to normal.

=== Black Goliath ===
Origin blurb from Black Goliath #1

BILL FOSTER — Dr. William Barrett Foster, DSc, PhD — a child of the GHETTO who has pulled himself up out of the Los Angeles slums to become director of one of the nation's most prestigious research labs. A man whose research has given him the power to instantaneously grow to a height of FIFTEEN FEET, with the strength of a TRUE GIANT. A man who has become... a HERO.

Bill Foster moves to the West Coast and acquires the formula to "Pym Particles", which give him the ability to grow in size like Pym. Taking the name "Black Goliath", he helps Power Man fight the Circus of Crime. He later battles the original Atom-Smasher, the second Vulcan, and Stilt-Man. The mercenary Warhawk kills Atom-Smasher and flees before Black Goliath can catch him.

Black Goliath later assists the Champions of Los Angeles in battling Stilt-Man, then joins the group part-time as a technical advisor. After the Champions disband, Black Goliath and a large group of other heroes attend a Defenders membership rally; this incarnation of the Defenders lasts only one mission before disbanding.

=== Giant-Man ===
==== The Project Pegasus Saga ====
Bill Foster joins the staff of Project Pegasus, an energy research facility, as a biochemical researcher. While there, he reveals his Black Goliath identity to the Thing, who works in Project Pegasus' security. While answering an emergency alarm, Foster decides to change his alias to the name "Giant-Man" at the Thing's suggestion. Alongside the Thing, Quasar, and the Aquarian, Giant-Man defends Project Pegasus against Nuklo, the Grapplers, Klaw, Solarr, and Nth Man.

After working at Project Pegasus for a short time, Foster reveals that he is dying from radiation poisoning he contracted in his earlier fight with Atom-Smasher. Foster is given a blood transfusion from Spider-Woman, which cures his radiation poisoning, but removes his powers and causes Spider-Woman to lose her immunity to radiation.

==== Evolutionary War ====
Bill Foster next appears in the storyline "The Evolutionary War", where he is working for the High Evolutionary in the Savage Land. After discovering the High Evolutionary's plans for a genetic bomb, Foster sends a distress message to the West Coast Avengers. Mockingbird, Tigra, and Moon Knight answer his summons and join him in destroying the base. Foster reveals that he had been suffering from cancer since his last appearance. He retakes an improved growth serum which adds cancer-free mass to his body, so he remains at giant size until he can receive further treatment.

=== Abandoning the hero role ===
Bill Foster soon gives up the Giant-Man identity, which Hank Pym subsequently takes back for himself. Shortly afterward, Erik Josten's ionic powers are disrupted in a battle against the West Coast Avengers. This causes an energy disruption which allows a race of extra-dimensional creatures, the Kosmosians, to attack Earth. Although the creatures are repelled, the energy disruption and effects on the Pym Particles affect all that have ever been exposed to them, except Pym himself, causing them to lose control of their powers.

=== Final return ===
Bill Foster regains his powers through unknown means. Under his Black Goliath identity, he appears briefly as part of an ad-hoc team of "urban" superheroes (Luke Cage, Iron Fist, Brother Voodoo, and Falcon).

Foster dons the Goliath identity without the "black" in the name and along with a new costume to first help the Thing deal with a supervillain (along with hitting up for a research grant). He later helps Spider-Man track down the Hulk, as Bruce Banner may be able to deal with Spider-Man's cellular degeneration.

=== Civil War ===
When the Civil War breaks out, Bill Foster as Goliath is seen as a member of Captain America's anti-registration Secret Avengers. During a battle between the Secret Avengers and Iron Man's pro-registration forces, Foster is killed by Ragnarok, a clone of Thor. Foster is buried in his giant form, with Iron Man paying for the thirty-eight burial plots required to accommodate his body. His death affects the war's balance of forces, leading several characters to switch sides, such as Spider-Man defecting to Captain America's side.

=== Legacy ===
Bill's nephew, M.I.T. student Tom Foster, informs the Black Panther of intending to follow in his uncle's footsteps by cracking the Pym Particle formula and being a hero. Tom publicly denounces Reed Richards and Iron Man because of his uncle's death. Tom later recreates and drinks his uncle's formula.

When Hercules ventures into the Underworld, Bill Foster is one of numerous deceased characters seen in Erebus: the place in between life and death where those who feel they still have business in the mortal world gamble and linger for their resurrection.

It is later revealed that Foster had worked with Hank on a virtual reality program where one could upload their consciousness and live on after death prior to his own death. The grieving Pym uploads Foster's mind into the program, in effect creating a virtual Utopia for him. A.I.M. later attempts to hijack the program, but Pym was able to defeat them with Eric O'Grady's help. O'Grady (disguised as Pym in the virtual world) converses briefly with Foster, who tells him to stop pushing loved ones away.

== Powers and abilities ==
Bill Foster's superpowers are a result of his biochemical formula containing Pym particles that he ingested. He has the ability to increase his size into gigantic levels by psionically drawing mass from an extra-dimensional source, while gaining immense strength and durability in this height. The extra mass returns to its source as he decreases in size. The process of height alteration is fatiguing, making Foster more vulnerable to harm, after successive changes.

Foster was capable of routinely growing to 15 feet (4.6 m) in height and could lift approximately five tons at that size. After regaining his powers during the "Evolutionary War", it does not provide precise quantification, but he can now grow to 25 feet (7.6 m) tall.

Bill Foster possesses a gifted intellect with an extensive knowledge of biochemistry.

== Other versions ==
=== Ant-Man Season One ===
An alternate universe version of Bill Foster appears in the graphic novel Ant-Man: Season One.

=== Contest of Champions ===
An alternate universe version of Bill Foster appears in Contest of Champions, where he is resurrected by Tony Stark using the Reality Gem following his death in Civil War.

=== Marvel Zombies ===
Two zombified versions of Bill Foster / Black Goliath appear in the series Marvel Zombies. The first version appears in Marvel Zombies vs. The Army of Darkness, where he is killed by Doctor Doom's forces. The second version appears in Marvel Zombies Return, where he is decapitated and his still-living head is used as part of a makeshift computer to allow dimensional travel.

=== MC2 ===
A possible future version of Bill Foster appears in A-Next, where his son John Foster becomes the hero Earth Sentry.

=== Spidey Super Stories ===
An alternate universe version of Bill Foster / Giant-Man appears in Spidey Super Stories. This version became Giant-Man following Hank Pym's retirement.

=== What If? ===
Two alternate universe versions of Bill Foster appear in the one-shot What If Civil War Ended Differently?. In "What If Captain America Led All the Heroes Against the Registration Act", Foster appears on Captain America's side. In "What If Iron Man Lost the Civil War", Foster survives Ragnarok's attack due to Iron Man's intervention.

== In other media ==
=== Marvel Cinematic Universe ===
Bill Foster appears in media set in the Marvel Cinematic Universe (MCU), primarily portrayed by Laurence Fishburne, while his son Langston portrays him in flashbacks. This version is a former member of S.H.I.E.L.D., Hank Pym's assistant on "Project Goliath", and Ava Starr's surrogate father after Elihas Starr's death.

- Introduced in the live-action film Ant-Man and the Wasp, Foster teaches quantum physics at UC Berkeley when he encounters Pym, Scott Lang, and Hope van Dyne. After Ava captures them, Foster explains his intent to cure Ava of her quantum instability by obtaining energy from the Quantum Realm. After Pym, Lang, and Hope escape, Foster and Ava steal Pym's lab, but their former captives retake it. After Janet van Dyne stabilizes Ava, Foster goes on the run with the latter.
- Alternate reality variants of Foster who became Goliath appears in the Disney+ animated series What If...?, voiced by Fishburne.

=== Television ===
Bill Foster appears in the Moon Girl and Devil Dinosaur episode "Devil on Her Shoulder", voiced again by Laurence Fishburne.

=== Video games ===
- Bill Foster as Goliath appears as a boss in Marvel: Ultimate Alliance 2, voiced by Emerson Brooks.
- Bill Foster as Goliath appears as a playable character in Marvel Super Hero Squad Online.
- Bill Foster as Black Goliath appears as a playable character in Lego Marvel's Avengers, voiced by James C. Mathis III.

=== Miscellaneous ===
Bill Foster appears in The Avengers: United They Stand #1.
