= Jesse Burch =

American actor

- Born: Jesse E. Johnson; September 2, 1970 (age 56); Fort Belvoir, Virginia, U.S.
- Occupation: Actor
- Years active: 1998–present

Jesse Burch (born Jesse E. Johnson; September 2, 1970) is an American actor.

== Filmography ==
=== Film ===
Year	Title	Role	Notes
2000	Love, Lust & Joy	Glen	
2003	The Making of Daniel Boone	Max	
2004	The Last Shot	Hollywood Boulevard Type	
2005	The Ring Two	Male Reporter	
2005	Undiscovered	Airline Rep	
2005	Shopgirl	Man at Gallery	Uncredited
2005	Flightplan	Row 19 Male Passenger	
2006	Young, Single & Angry	Greg	
2007	Evan Almighty	Ark Reporter	
2012	What to Expect When You're Expecting	Hutch Davidson	
2013	A Good Day to Die Hard	Smoker	
2016	Hulk: Where Monsters Dwell	Bruce Banner, Waiter	Voice, direct-to-video
2016	Kingsglaive: Final Fantasy XV	Kingsglaive	Voice
2017	The Last Word	Moderator	
TBA	500 Fireflies	Roscoe	

=== Television ===
Year	Title	Role	Notes
1998	For Your Love	Race Official	Episode: "The Games People Play"
1998	The Wayans Bros.	Bearded Man	Episode: "A Country Christmas"
1999	Time of Your Life	Delivery Guy	Episode: "The Time She Came to New York"
2001	The Guardian	Waiter	Episode: "Feeding Frenzy"
2003	The West Wing	Staffer Jay	Episode: "Guns Not Butter"
2003	A.U.S.A.	Ryder	Episode: "Pilot"
2003	The Practice	Randall Pyne	Episode: "Heroes and Villains"
2003	Carnivàle	Mackey	Episode: "Black Blizzard"
2003	Grounded for Life	Waiter	Episode: "Pay You Back with Interest"
2003	The District	Ronald Rasmussen	Episode: "Jupiter for Sale"
2003	Joan of Arcadia	Dave	Episode: "Death Be Not Whatever"
2004	Las Vegas	Lawyer #1	Episode: "Always Faithful"
2005	Judging Amy	Ruben Bauer	Episode: "Silent Era"
2005	The King of Queens	Judd	Episode: "Gorilla Warfare"
2005	CSI: Miami	Mort Shapiro	Episode: "Nothing to Lose"
2005	What I Like About You	Jim	Episode: "Pranks a Lot"
2005	Threshold	Darryl Brown	Episode: "The Order"
2006	Vanished	Cooper	2 episodes
2006	Drake & Josh	Officer Brenner	Episode: "The Wedding"
2007	The O.C.	Bookstore Guy	Episode: "The French Connection"
2007	The Singles Table	Brian	Episode: "Pilot"
2009	Nip/Tuck	Realtor	Episode: "Budi Sabri"
2009	The Mentalist	Agent Dyson	2 episodes
2010	Fake It Til You Make It	Kevin	Episode: "You Are What You Drive"
2010	Notes from the Underbelly	Kip	Episode: "The Weekend"
2010	Parenthood	Bob	Episode: "If This Boat Is a Rockin'"
2012	Harry's Law	Jude Drake	Episode: "Les Horribles"
2015	Black-ish	Keith	Episode: "Big Night, Big Fight"
2015–2018	Guardians of the Galaxy	Black Dwarf, Bruce Banner, Moragan, Ravager	Voice, 6 episodes
2016	Just Add Magic	Mr. Edmunds	Episode: "Just Add Jake"
2016	Avengers Assemble	Bruce Banner, Erik Josten	Voice, 7 episodes
2025	Fallout	Victor	Episode: "The Profligate"

=== Video games ===
Year	Title	Voice role
2006	The Lord of the Rings: The Battle for Middle-earth II	Tom Bombadil
2006	Tom Clancy's Splinter Cell: Essentials	Williams
2006	Full Spectrum Warrior: Ten Hammers	Voice
2006	Reservoir Dogs	Voice
2007	Command & Conquer 3: Tiberium Wars	Voice
2008	Command & Conquer 3: Kane's Wrath	Voice
2010	Fallout: New Vegas	Dr. Whitely, The Dad
2011	Dungeon Siege III	Phineas, additional voices
2012	Warhammer Online: Wrath of Heroes	Glowgob
2014	WildStar	Malvolio Portius
2015	Marvel: Future Fight	Black Dwarf
2017	Call of Duty: WWII	Voice
2019	Marvel Ultimate Alliance 3: The Black Order	Cull Obsidian
2023	Diablo IV	Male Necromancer
2024	Wayfinder	Brother Magan
