= Vibro (comics) =

Publication information
- Publisher: Marvel Comics
- First appearance: Iron Man #186 (September 1984)
- Created by: Denny O'Neil and Luke McDonnell

In-story information
- Alter ego: Alton Francis Vibreaux

Vibro is a supervillain appearing in American comic books published by Marvel Comics.

== Fictional character biography ==
Alton Vibreaux was born in Baton Rouge, Louisiana. Working as a seismologist and engineer, he fell into the San Andreas Fault during the testing of an experimental nuclear-powered apparatus, giving him superpowers and leaving him mentally unstable. He battles James Rhodes as Iron Man. He is later sent to the Vault, a prison for superpowered individuals. Alongside the Griffin, he attempts to escape, encountering the Falcon and Nomad. Vibro caused a massive earthquake in Los Angeles, and battled the Avengers West Coast, and later battled the original Iron Man again.

Vibro is killed and resurrected by the Hand, and joins an assault on the S.H.I.E.L.D. helicarrier. Mandarin and Zeke Stane later recruit him to help defeat Iron Man.

== Powers and abilities ==
Vibro has the ability to generate high-level seismic vibrations and fire them from his hands as vibratory or concussive force, enabling him to generate shockwaves and earthquakes. He can harness the energy of his vibratory force emissions for flight at subsonic speeds, and generate shields of vibratory force around himself. His powers decrease in magnitude as his distance from the San Andreas Fault increases. He also wears body armor of an unknown composition and synthetic stretch fabric. As Vibreaux, he has a Ph.D. in geological engineering.

Vibro is mentally unstable due to the traumatic accident that gave him his powers; he also suffered acute facial disfigurement and scalp damage.
