= Erik Josten =

Fictional character appearing in comic books published by Marvel Comics

- Erik Josten as Atlas seen on the cover of New Thunderbolts #12 (Nov. 2005). Art by Tom Grummett.

Publication information
- Publisher: Marvel Comics
- First appearance: As Power Man: The Avengers #21 (Oct. 1965); As Smuggler: Peter Parker, the Spectacular Spider-Man #49 (Dec. 1980); As Goliath: Iron Man Annual #7 (Oct. 1984); As Atlas: The Incredible Hulk vol. 2 #449 (Jan. 1997)
- Created by: Power Man: Stan Lee; Don Heck; Smuggler: Roger Stern; Jim Mooney; Atlas: Kurt Busiek; Mark Bagley

In-story information
- Alter ego: Erik Stephan Josten
- Species: Human mutate
- Team affiliations: Thunderbolts; Lethal Legion; Masters of Evil; Emissaries of Evil; Defenders; Revengers
- Partnerships: Swordsman
- Notable aliases: Power Man, Smuggler, Goliath, Atlas
- Abilities: Pym particle/Ionic-energy physiology: Superhuman strength, durability, agility, reflexes and stamina; Invulnerability; Size and mass manipulation; Mass transference; Dimensional shifting; Portal creation; Flight; Energy manipulation and transference; Ionic blasts; Immortality; Regenerative healing factor; Military training; Expert hand-to-hand combatant; Skilled marksman and tactician; Trained pilot

Erik Josten, also known as Power Man, Smuggler, Goliath and Atlas, is a fictional character appearing in American comic books published by Marvel Comics. The character has been a prominent member of both the Masters of Evil and the Thunderbolts.

== Publication history ==
Created by writer Stan Lee and artist Don Heck, the character first appeared in The Avengers #21 (Oct. 1965) as Power Man, in Peter Parker, the Spectacular Spider-Man #49 (Dec. 1980) as Smuggler, in Iron Man Annual #7 (October 1984) as Goliath, and in The Incredible Hulk vol. 2 #449 (Jan. 1997) as Atlas.

== Fictional character biography ==
Erik Josten's first appearance as Power Man from The Avengers #21 (Oct. 1965), art by Jack Kirby and Wally Wood.

Erik Josten was born in Milwaukee, Wisconsin. A former AWOL Marine turned mercenary, he is employed by Heinrich Zemo as head of his South American security/mercenary force. After Zemo's death, Josten is convinced by the Enchantress to undergo the same 'ionic-ray' treatment (from a machine invented by Zemo) as Simon Williams (Wonder Man), making Josten super-strong. Taking the name "Power Man", he becomes the Enchantress' partner and battles the Avengers at her request. He later fights the Avengers again as a member of the first Lethal Legion.

Eventually, Josten meets Luke Cage, a hero who for a time has assumed the name Power Man. The two fight over the right to use the name, and Cage wins. Josten then joins Count Nefaria's Lethal Legion under the promise that Nefaria would greatly increase Josten's powers. Nefaria complies, but later steals Josten's enhanced powers, which greatly reduces his strength.

Erik Josten's first appearance as Smuggler from Peter Parker, the Spectacular Spider-Man #49 (December 1980), art by Keith Pollard.

His strength fading, Josten changes his costume and becomes a smuggler, taking the unimaginative yet appropriate name of the "Smuggler". In his first and only appearance as Smuggler, he is defeated by Spider-Man.

Later, he gains the ability to grow to giant size from Karl Malus using a sample of Hank Pym's growth serum. He then takes on the name "Goliath", a name used previously by superheroes, and again changes his costume. He fights James Rhodes as Iron Man and the West Coast Avengers, who defeat him. Using his ability, he is sent by Doctor Doom to kill Spider-Man, but Goliath is defeated thanks to the hero's cosmic powers.

Erik Josten's first appearance as the super-sized villain Goliath from Iron Man Annual #7 (Oct. 1984); art by Luke McDonnell.

Josten joins a new fourth version of the Masters of Evil, founded by Helmut Zemo. During his time with this group, Josten is one of the villains who invades and captures Avengers Mansion and beats Hercules severely.

When Zemo later decides to disguise the Masters of Evil as a superhero team called the Thunderbolts, Josten creates the original identity (and costume) of "Atlas". During this time, he began dating the Thunderbolts' liaison Dallas Riordan. However, like most of the Thunderbolts, Atlas begins to enjoy public admiration, and eventually reforms to attempt to be a genuine superhero, even after the Thunderbolts' criminal past is publicly revealed.

After absorbing energy from Nefaria's "ionic bomb", Josten mutates into a gigantic ionic energy creature. He is dispersed by Scourge and apparently killed. Josten is later revaeled to have survived. Riordan absorbs Josten's ionic energy, leaving him powerless until Fixer gives him a new dose of Pym Particles.

During a battle against the Grandmaster, Josten temporarily surrenders his powers to Zemo and is left stuck in a giant form, too heavy even to move and communicate. Atlas is restored to normal size by scientists at Camp Hammond and registered as part of the Initiative, although his size-changing powers are considered too unreliable to place him on an Initiative team.

Atlas is later recruited by Wonder Man (whose ionic energy leaking problem was affecting his judgement) to join his Revengers. Atlas's reason for joining the Revengers was that his numerous requests to join the Initiative were denied.

During the Avengers: Standoff! storyline, Atlas appears as an inmate of Pleasant Hill, a gated community established by S.H.I.E.L.D. He has had his memories altered by Kobik, making him believe that he is a normal mailman. After regaining his memories, Atlas joins Winter Soldier's incarnation of the Thunderbolts to prevent S.H.I.E.L.D. from continuing the Kobik project.

In the Secret Empire storyline, Atlas, Moonstone, and Fixer return to the Masters of Evil after Helmut Zemo uses Kobik's abilities to send Winter Soldier back in time. After Kobik is shattered, Atlas assists in searching for her fragments for Zemo to revive her.

== Powers and abilities ==
Similarly to Wonder Man and Count Nefaria, Erik Josten is a virtually indestructible immortal made of "ionic energy", as a result of the application of mutagenic processes developed by Heinrich Zemo. He possesses superhuman dynamism regarding strength, coordination, stamina and durability. He is practically invulnerable even at normal size.

After losing his ionic powers to Nefaria, Josten would gain new abilities as a result of Karl Malus' experimentations, additionally gaining the power to increase his size and mass at will. Originally he was limited to convert his normal 6-foot (1.8 m) height to his maximum 60-foot (18 m), but he later learned to increase this limit when he was angry. His durability also increases with his height, and if his physical state were ever to be disrupted in any way, he would eventually physically reincorporate himself even from death if need be, giving him an expedient regenerative ability capable of reconstructing his body, if given enough time.

After Nefaria had consolidated his ionic energy to be predominant, Josten gained access to the fullest effect of his latent abilities. He is able to transform into pure ionic energy, fly, maintain his increased power while at normal height, and lacks the need for physical sustenance.

Josten is depicted as trained in armed and unarmed combat from his time in the military and as a mercenary. He is also portrayed as a skilled pilot able to fly most types of aircraft, and as a capable field tactician who prefers to follow rather than lead.

== Reception ==
- In 2021, CBR.com ranked Power Man 6th in their "Marvel: 10 Characters Baron Zemo Created In The Comics" list.

== Other versions ==
=== Amalgam Comics ===
Oliver Queen/Goliath, a composite character based on Erik Josten and DC Comics character Green Arrow, appears in the Amalgam Comics imprint.

=== JLA/Avengers ===
Erik Josten as Goliath appears in JLA/Avengers as a brainwashed minion of Krona.

=== Marvel Zombies ===
An alternate universe version of Erik Josten / Atlas makes a minor appearance in Marvel Zombies: Dead Days as a member of the Thunderbolts.

=== Marvel Adventures: The Avengers ===
An alternate universe version of Erik Josten / Goliath appears in Marvel Adventures: The Avengers #20. This version is Hank Pym's research assistant and possesses a grudge against Pym and a crush on Janet van Dyne/Giant Girl.

=== House of M ===
An alternate universe version of Erik Josten / Power Man appears in House of M.

=== Old Man Logan ===
An alternate universe version of Erik Josten / Atlas appears in Old Man Hawkeye. This version is a member of the Thunderbolts who betrayed Hawkeye and sided with Red Skull, resulting in the deaths of all of the other Avengers. Years later, Josten works as Atlas in a circus until Hawkeye hunts him down and challenges him to one final battle before killing him.

== In other media ==
=== Television ===
- Erik Josten / Power Man appears in The Marvel Super Heroes, voiced by Paul Kligman.
- Erik Josten as Goliath and Atlas appears in Avengers Assemble, voiced by Jesse Burch.

=== Video games ===
- Erik Josten / Goliath appears in Iron Man and X-O Manowar in Heavy Metal.
- Erik Josten / Atlas appears in Lego Marvel's Avengers as part of the "Thunderbolts" DLC pack.
