= List of Russian superheroes =

This is a list of comic book superheroes originating from Russia or the former Soviet Union.

== Bubble Comics ==
Bubble Comics is the biggest Russian comic book publisher and produces monthly non-franchised comic books.

- Danila the Demonslayer: A grim avenger who exterminates demons with the power of living tattoos made from Satan's blood.
- Major Grom (Igor Grom): A detective from Saint Petersburg known for his daring nature and uncompromising attitude towards criminals.
- Friar (Andrey Radov): The heir to an ancient generation and the owner of a powerful artefact – a cross inlaid with Power Gems.
- Red Fury: A thief recruited by agent Delta from the International Control Agency.
- Meteora (Alena Kunzetsov): A legendary space smuggler.
- Lilia Romanova: A teenager from Moscow who unveils the secrets of the "Bookwizard Order" whose members have been trying to hold the balance between the book world and reality.

== DC Comics ==
- Anatole: A former member of Red Trinity, a trio of speedsters modeled after the Flash. He is currently the owner of Kapitalist Kouriers, a courier company.
- Bebeck: A former member of Red Trinity who is currently an ally of the Flash and an employee of Kapitalist Kouriers.
- Bolshoi: A martial artist and dancer with superhuman agility and former member of the People's Heroes.
- Cassiopea: A former member of Red Trinity who is currently an ally of the Flash and an employee of Kapitalist Kouriers.
- Cossack: A member of the Batmen of Many Nations from the Kingdom Come timeline.
- Creote: An ally of the Birds of Prey.
- Fireball (Sonya Chuikov): A member of the Young Allies.
- Firebird (Serafina Arkadina): The leader of Soyuz, a group of teen heroes. She is the niece of Pozhar and possesses telepathic abilities.
- Fusion: Three men known only as One, Two, and Three who can combine their bodies into a single superior form.
- Hammer: A metahuman with super strength, a member of the People's Heroes, and the husband of Sickle.
- Molotov: A member of the People's Heroes who can detonate his body at will.
- Morozko (Igor Medviedenko): A member of Soyuz who can generate ice.
- Perun (lya Trepilov): A member of Soyuz who can generate electricity.
- Pozhar (Mikhail Arkadin): A Russian hero and former Rocket Red who was once bonded to Firestorm.
- Pravda: A member of the People's Heroes who possesses various mental abilities.
- Proletariat (Boris Dhomov): A Soviet supersoldier created during World War II.
- Red Star (Leonid Kovar): A member of the Teen Titans who can generate radiation.
- Red Son Superman: An alternate universe version of Superman who landed in Russia rather than Kansas and was raised as a Stalinist.
- Rocket Red Brigade: A group of armored soldiers dedicated to protecting the Russian Federation.
- Rusalka (Mashenka Medviedenko): A member of Soyuz who can generate water.
- Anya Savenlovich: A former Green Lantern.
- Sickle: A metahuman with super strength, a member of the People's Heroes, and the wife of Hammer.
- Snow Owl: A former KGB operative who joined the Hellenders and is able to generate intense cold.
- Stalnoivolk: A member of the Red Shadows who possesses superhuman strength and durability.
- Tundra: A member of the Global Guardians who can generate intense cold.
- Valentina Vostok: A former member of the Doom Patrol who can generate a radioactive 'soul-self'.
- Vikhor (Feodor Sorin): A member of Soyuz who can spin at high speeds, enabling him to generate wind and fly.

=== Wildstorm (ABC/Homage) ===
- Void (Adrianna Tereshkova): A member of WildC.A.T.S.
- Void (Nikola Hanssen): A member of WildC.A.T.S.
- Winter (Nikolas Kamarov): A member of Stormwatch.

== Marvel Comics ==
- Airstrike (Dmitri Bukharin): A member of the People's Protectorate and Winter Guard.
- Black Widow (Natasha Romanoff): A spy who is a member and former enemy of the Avengers.
- Black Widow (Yelena Belova): The second Black Widow and a member of the Thunderbolts.
- Blind Faith (Alexi Garnoff): A telepathic mutant and the leader of the Russian Exiles. He lost his powers during the Decimation.
- Bora: A mutant who could create intense cold. She lost her powers during the Decimation.
- Colossus (Piotr Rasputin): A member of the X-Men who can transform his body into organic steel.
- Concussion (Mikhail): A mutant and member of the Russian Exiles who can generate blasts of concussive force. He was killed by the assassin Firefox.
- Darkstar: A member of the Winter Guard and former member of the Soviet Super-Soldiers who can manipulate the Darkforce.
- Doctor Volkh (Vladimir Orekhov): A cosmonaut who gained an elastic body after being exposed to cosmic radiation. He is the leader of the Bogatyri, the Russian equivalent of the Fantastic Four.
- Epsilon Red (Ivanov): A genetically-engineered cosmonaut with psychic abilities.
- Fantasma: A member of the People's Protectorate who possesses various magical abilities.
- Gregor Smerdyakov: A mutant and resident of District X who gradually transforms into a tree while asleep.
- Iron Curtain (Simas Androvich): A mutant and member of the Russian Exiles who possesses superhuman strength and durability. He was killed by the assassin Firefox.
- Katyusha: A member of the First Line who the Black Fox convinced to defect to the United States.
- Magik (Illyana Rasputina): A member of the New Mutants and the X-Men who is Colossus' sister. She possesses various magical abilities, including the ability to travel to the realm of Limbo.
- Mentac: A mutant and member of the Russian Exiles who possesses superhuman intelligence. He was killed by the assassin Firefox.
- Mikhail Rasputin: A mutant who can manipulate matter and the older brother of Colossus and Magik. He is a former cosmonaut and has acted as both a superhero and supervillain.
- Mikula (Mikula Golubev): A mutant and member of the Bogatyri who possesses telepathy and telekinesis.
- Morning Star (Marya Meshkov): A member of the Bogatyri who can generate intense heat.
- Perun (Valeri Sovloyev): A member of the People's Protectorate and the avatar of his namesake.
- Red Guardian: The name of several Russian superheroes. The first and most prominent is Alexei Shostakov, the husband of Natasha Romanoff / Black Widow.
- Sibercat (Illich Lavrov): A cat-like mutant and member of the Winter Guard.
- Sputnik: A member of the People's Protectorate who was transformed into an android by alien technology.
- Stencil: A mutant and member of the Russian Exiles who can absorb the minds of others.
- Starlight (Tania Belinsky): A neurosurgeon who the Presence gave nuclear abilities.
- Steel Guardian (Josef Petkus): The fourth Red Guardian and a member of the Winter Guard.
- Svyatogor (Sasha Pokryshkin): A member of the Bogatyri who possesses superhuman strength.
- Synthesizer (Zoya Vasilievna and Arkady Tegai): Two mutates who can merge to become Synthesizer.
- Ursa Major (Mikhail Ursus): A mutant and member of the Winter Guard who can transform into a humanoid bear.
- Vanguard (Nikolai Krylenko): A member of the Winter Guard and the brother of Darkstar who can generate force fields.

=== Epic ===
- Molniya ("Lightning" from Wild Cards)

=== New Universe ===
- Stacey Inyushin: A member of Psi-Force with healing powers.
- Crasniye Solleetsi (Red Sun), a team of Russian paranormal.

== Other publishers ==
=== Fleetway / Rebellion ===
- Nikolai Dante: A thief and adventurer, bonded with a techno-organic device called a Weapons Crest.

=== Harvey ===
- Tanya: A member of War Nurse's Girl Commandos.

=== Image Comics ===
- Animus Prime (Bar Sinister)
- Maya Antares: A sorceress from world of the Red Star.
- Red Rush: An analogue of the Flash in the pages of Invincible and a member of the Guardians of the Globe. He was killed by Omni-Man.

=== Love and Rockets ===
- Comrade 7 (A heroine with a fan club)

=== UNForce ===
- Mother Russia (UNForce)

Mercury Comics

- Atomika (Russian, nuclear themed superman)

== Public domain ==
- Octobriana (from the comic "Octobriana and the Russian Underground")
- Gritsko Sraka (from the comic "The last Molfar")

== Film and television ==
- Black Lightning (Dmitry Maykov), from the eponymous 2009 Russian film.
- Ilioukhine (Seigi Choujin from Russia, Kinnikuman Nisei)
- Linka (Captain Planet and the Planeteers)
- Supercat (comics, J. Kaczyński)
- Molotov Cocktease (The Venture Bros.)
- The Warsman (Seigi Choujin from Russia, Kinnikuman)
- Guardians (2017 film)
- Cosmoball (2020 film)
- Major Grom: Plague Doctor (2021), a superhero film about a police major named Igor Grom, based on the comic strip Major Grom.
