= Radioactive Man (comics) =

Marvel Comics supervillain

- The Chen Lu incarnation of Radioactive Man as depicted in Thunderbolts: International Incident (April 2008). Art by Marko Djurdjević.

Publication information
- Publisher: Marvel Comics
- First appearance: (Chen); Journey into Mystery #93 (June 1963) (Stancheck); Black Panther (vol. 4) #3 (April 2005)
- Created by: Chen Lu: Stan Lee (writer); Jack Kirby (artist); Igor Stancheck: Reginald Hudlin (writer); John Romita Jr. (artist)

In-story information
- Alter ego: Chen Lu; Igor Stancheck
- Species: Human mutate
- Team affiliations: People's Defense Force; Masters of Evil; Thunderbolts; Titanic Three
- Notable aliases: The Radioactive Man; R-Man
- Abilities: Genius intelligence; Radiation absorption and manipulation; Superhuman strength and durability; Energy blasts; Hypnotism; Phasing negation; Radiological constructs; EMP generation; Thermokinesis; Underwater breathing; Disease inducement

Radioactive Man is the name of several supervillains appearing in American comic books published by Marvel Comics. The first incarnation of Radioactive Man, Chen Lu, first appeared in Journey into Mystery #93 (June 1963). He was best known as a founding member of the Avengers opponents the Masters of Evil. The second incarnation, Igor Stancheck, debuted in Black Panther (vol. 4) #3 (June 2005).

== Publication history ==
Chen Lu / Radioactive Man first appeared in Journey into Mystery #93 (June 1963), and was created by Stan Lee and Jack Kirby.

Igor Stancheck / Radioactive Man first appeared in Black Panther (vol. 4) #3 (June 2005) and was created by Reginald Hudlin and John Romita Jr.

== Fictional character biography ==
=== Chen Lu ===
Radioactive Man's debut story begins with Thor's alter ego Donald Blake providing medical care for Indian soldiers injured in clashes with Chinese soldiers in the Himalayas. Thor then defeats a Chinese armored column. Later in Beijing, Zhou Enlai suggests to Mao Zedong that Thor must be destroyed and Mao orders Chinese scientist Chen Lu to devise a way to defeat Thor or die trying. Chen exposes himself to small doses of radiation until he is able to endure a massive barrage, becoming a living "Radioactive Man". He plans to take over the world.

Chen travels to New York City on a submarine. There, he battles Thor whom he hypnotizes in Times Square. Eventually, Thor is able to recover and uses a tornado to send Chen to western China, where Chen detonates.

Radioactive Man becomes a recurring foe of the Avengers, being coerced by Baron Zemo to join the original Masters of Evil in a bid to destroy the Avengers. He is the first to confront the Avengers, and sticks Captain America and Giant-Man to the pavement with an adhesive, which Thor dodges. He is defeated by Giant-Man and Iron Man when they imprison him in lead coils. He is then deported back to China. The character reappears with the new Masters of Evil, organized by Ultron. The villains, however, are betrayed by the Black Knight. Radioactive Man and his teammates appear once again during a Halloween parade and are defeated by a coalition of superheroines called the Lady Liberators.

Chen escapes and travels to Vietnam, where he joins Soviet villains Titanium Man and Crimson Dynamo as part of a team called the Titanic Three. Acting as crime fighters in Vietnam, the trio is duped by a con man and petty thief called the Slasher and end up battling the Avengers until the deception is uncovered. After an encounter with Iron Man, the characters go their separate ways. After a humiliating defeat by Kang the Conqueror in Giant-Size Avengers, Chen joins another incarnation of the Masters of Evil - led by Egghead - but is defeated by Ant-Man and deported back to China.

Radioactive Man continued to feature in Iron Man, and is employed by Iron Man's arch-enemy Mandarin. Chen is employed in his civilian capacity as a physicist by Stane International (taken over by Obadiah Stane). Radioactive Man appears in the graphic novel Deathtrap: The Vault, among other supervillains attempting to escape from the Vault. Chen, however, aids the heroes in preventing a nuclear meltdown.

Chen attempts to reform and joins the Thunderbolts, a team composed almost entirely of reformed supervillains. During the "Civil War" storyline, the character aids heroes Reed Richards and Yellowjacket imposter in building a holding prison for dissenting superpowered beings, and also battles the anti-registration heroes. During an encounter with Grandmaster, Radioactive Man absorbs an excessive amount of radiation and is forced to wear a radiation suit at all times. The radiation eventually subsides, but Norman Osborn convinces him to retain the suit to distract the American public from his clearly Asian features and quell any lingering fears about his radioactivity.

As part of the Thunderbolts, Radioactive Man fought Spider-Man and Anti-Venom during the New Ways to Die storyline; during the fight, Radioactive Man had a portion of his radiation powers drained by Anti-Venom. He continued with the team however, going after Moon Knight. Radioactive Man is one of Songbird's strongest allies within the team, often supporting her when she opposes Osborn.

After the events of Secret Invasion, Osborn and Moonstone began the process of neutralizing the members of the Thunderbolts who oppose Osborn in his plan to exploit the invasion for his own personal agenda to gain more power. Osborn arranged for Chen to be deported back to China, leading to a bittersweet departure with Songbird.

Radioactive Man reappears in The Mighty Avengers as part of People's Defense Force, a Chinese superhuman team. The Radioactive Man demonstrates that at close proximity he can safely absorb the radiation of Inhuman Xerogen crystals and presumably safely absorb Terrigen Mist. However, the People's Defense Force is largely defeated by the Unspoken, a deposed former king of the Inhumans. The Unspoken is defeated in China by the Mighty Avengers.

Radioactive Man later released a Chinese dragon made of magic in the Federal Bank Reserve. While Captain America, Iron Man, the female Thor, and Vision fought the dragon, Spider-Man, Ms. Marvel, and Nova encounter Radioactive Man. The senior Avengers managed to destroy the dragon, but upon reuniting with their wards, they learn they let Radioactive Man escape. The young heroes explain they were forced to leave Radioactive Man alone as there was a man that needed to be rescued. The senior Avengers are proud of what the young heroes did as heroes are meant to protect people first and foremost and welcomes them to the team.

=== Igor Stancheck ===
Featured in the fourth volume of Black Panther, Igor Stancheck is a Russian mutate and is one of several mercenaries (including Rhino, Batroc, Cannibal, and the Vatican Black Knight) who invade Wakanda. The group makes an unsuccessful attempt to destroy the vibranium mound located at the heart of Black Panther's kingdom. During this, Shuri kills Stancheck using Black Knight's Ebony Blade.

== Powers and abilities ==
Chen Lu has the ability to manipulate various forms of radiation. His powers include heat, "hard" radiation (inflicting opponents with nausea, dizziness, and extreme disorientation), EMP emissions to deactivate all machinery, and a hypnotic light. He can absorb nuclear energies without harming his body and store those energies for personal use, such as physical amplification, wound healing, creating energy constructs (like force fields or golems with greater strength and resilience than his own), and nuclear transduction alongside the electromagnetic spectrum. Radioactive Man is capable of rendering ghosts solid in mere seconds, as well as breathing underwater. He can create "radiation pills" which infuse an individual with enough radioactivity to give them severe radiation sickness while spreading the contamination to a large population. Radioactive Man is also an expert in nuclear physics. In later appearances, he must wear a containment suit to prevent his radiation from harming others.

== Other versions ==
=== Avataars: Covenant of the Shield ===
Green Death, a character inspired by Radioactive Man from the pocket dimension Eurth, appears in Avataars: Covenant of the Shield.

=== Heroes Reborn ===
An alternate universe version of Chen Lu / Radioactive Man from a pocket dimension created by Franklin Richards appears in "Heroes Reborn" as a member of Loki's Masters of Evil.

=== House of M ===
An alternate universe version of Chen Lu / Radioactive Man from Earth-58163 appears in House of M.

=== Marvel 2099 ===
An unidentified alternate universe version of Radioactive Man from Earth-2099 appears in "Marvel 2099".

== In other media ==
=== Television ===
- The Chen Lu incarnation of Radioactive Man appears in The Marvel Super Heroes, voiced by Gillie Fenwick. This version is a member of Heinrich Zemo's Masters of Evil.
- The Igor Stancheck incarnation of Radioactive Man appears in Black Panther, voiced by Rick D. Wasserman.
- The Chen Lu incarnation of Radioactive Man makes non-speaking appearances in The Avengers: Earth's Mightiest Heroes.
- The Igor Stancheck incarnation of Radioactive Man appears in the Avengers Assemble episode "Secret Avengers", voiced by Roger Craig Smith. This version is a member of the Winter Guard.

=== Video games ===
- The Chen Lu incarnation of Radioactive Man appears as a mini-boss in Marvel: Ultimate Alliance, voiced by James Sie. This version is a member of Doctor Doom's Masters of Evil.
- The Chen Lu incarnation of Radioactive Man appears as a boss in Marvel: Ultimate Alliance 2, voiced by Don Luce.
- The Chen Lu incarnation of Radioactive Man appears as a playable character in Lego Marvel's Avengers.
- The Chen Lu incarnation of Radioactive Man appears in Marvel: Avengers Alliance 2.
