= Marvel Future Avengers =

Japanese superhero animated television series

- Key visual for the first season by character designer Takahiro Umehara. From the back row (left to right): Wasp, Hulk, Thor, Iron Man, Captain America, Adi, Makoto, and Chloe.

マーベル フューチャー・アベンジャーズ (Māberu Fu~yūchā Abenjāzu)
- Genre: Superhero
- Anime television series
- Directed by: Yūzō Satō
- Produced by: Satoshi Ochiai; Scott Dolph
- Written by: Ryū King
- Music by: Tetsuya Takahashi
- Studio: Madhouse
- Licensed by: Marvel Entertainment
- Original network: Dlife, Tokyo MX
- English network: SEA: Disney XD
- Original run: July 22, 2017 – January 20, 2018
- Episodes: 26
- Anime television series

Marvel Future Avengers Season 2
- Directed by: Yūzō Satō
- Produced by: Satoshi Ochiai; Scott Dolph
- Written by: Ryū King
- Music by: Tetsuya Takahashi
- Studio: Madhouse
- Licensed by: Marvel Entertainment
- Original network: Dlife, Tokyo MX
- English network: SEA: Disney XD
- Original run: July 30, 2018 – October 22, 2018
- Episodes: 13
- Other series
- Marvel Anime; Marvel Disk Wars: The Avengers
- icon

Marvel Future Avengers (Japanese: マーベル フューチャー・アベンジャーズ, Hepburn: Māberu Fu~yūchā Abenjāzu) is a Japanese superhero anime television series produced by Madhouse and Walt Disney Japan, based on the Marvel Comics universe. The series follows a group of teenagers with special powers, who are trained by the Avengers to become superheroes. The first season began airing on the Dlife satellite channel in July 2017 and ran for 26 episodes, followed by a 13 episode second season in 2018. The series was released internationally through Disney+ in February 2020.

== Premise ==
The series follows Makoto, Adi, and Chloe, three teenagers who have been raised by Hydra to believe that they are being trained to become superheroes and that the Avengers are villains. The three have been genetically modified by Hydra, resulting in each gaining the unique superhuman abilities of air manipulation, technology control, and shapeshifting respectively. After being sent on missions for Hydra, Adi and Chloe come to realize the organization's evil intentions and decide to defect. Makoto joins them, becoming the only one to escape, and he convinces the Avengers to help him liberate Adi and Chloe. Realizing the potential they have, the Avengers decide to take the three in and train them to become superheroes, dubbing the team the "Future Avengers". While training the new recruits, the Avengers also seek to learn more about the "Emerald Rain Project", a dangerous scheme being orchestrated by Hydra and the Masters of Evil, and what connection it has to Makoto. The matter becomes further complicated when Bruno, a teenage cyborg and Makoto's best friend, is manipulated into joining the Masters of Evil's ranks.

In the show's second season, exposure to Terrigen Mist leads to several humans developing superpowers. With anti-Inhuman sentiment on the rise and the Inhuman royal family claiming custody of the afflicted, the Avengers and Future Avengers, now including Bruno, must manage the fallout of the outbreak and attempt to broker peace between Earth and Attilan before they are forced to go to war.

== Voice cast ==
Role	Japanese voice actor	English dub actor
Makoto / Hurricane	Aki Kanada	Max Mittelman
Chloe / Charade	Juri Kimura	Jeannie Elias
Adi / Codec	Atsushi Tamaru	Xander Mobus
Bruno / Twister	Shinya Hamazoe	Todd Haberkorn
Tony Stark / Iron Man	Eiji Hanawa	Mick Wingert
Steve Rogers / Captain America	Kazuhiro Nakaya	Roger Craig Smith
Thor Odinson	Yasuyuki Kase	Patrick Seitz
Bruce Banner / Hulk	Kenichirou Matsuda	Fred Tatasciore
Janet Van Dyne / Wasp	Kaori Mizuhashi	Kari Wahlgren
F.R.I.D.A.Y.	Fumie Misuzawa	Colleen O'Shaughnessey

== Production ==
Marvel Future Avengers was first announced in February 2017 for broadcast on Disney's Dlife satellite channel the following summer. The series' premiere date, cast and staff were later confirmed the following May. Yūzō Satō, the director of Marvel Anime: Iron Man, was announced as the series director, with Takahiro Umehara providing the character designs. Ryū King, the lead writer on 2014's Marvel Disk Wars: The Avengers, returned to write Marvel Future Avengers; the Japanese Disk Wars voice cast also reprise their respective roles. In January 2018, a second season of the series was announced, which premiered in July of that same year. The anime was later announced for a western release via Disney+, with the first season added on February 28, 2020, and the second season on May 22, 2020.

== Episodes ==
Season	Episodes	Originally released	
Season	Episodes	First released	Last released
1	26	July 22, 2017	January 20, 2018
2	13	July 30, 2018	October 22, 2018

=== Season 1 ===
No. overall	No. in season	Dub Title (Note: English dub titles per Disney+.) / English translation Original Japanese title	Written by	Storyboards	Original release date
1	1	"Destroy the Avengers" / "Aim for the Avengers"; Transliteration: "Abenjāzu o Nerae" (Japanese: アベンジャーズを狙え)	Ryū King	Yūzō Satō	July 22, 2017
Makoto, Adi, Chloe, and Bruno are teenagers who have been genetically modified and manipulated by Hydra to believe the Avengers are villains. After being deployed in the field, Adi and Chloe are horrified by the crimes they are forced to commit and decide to escape. They convince Makoto to join them, who insists they do the same for Bruno, but are intercepted as they attempt to sneak out. Makoto manages to escape and flies to Avengers Tower, where Tony Stark is researching a Hydra initiative known as the "Emerald Rain Project". Despite his distrust of Stark, Makoto offers the location of Hydra's base in exchange for his friends' rescue. Stark agrees and departs with the Avengers for Hydra's base, detaining Makoto in the tower. At the base, Bruno reveals to the captive Adi and Chloe that he already knows Hydra is evil, and has sworn fealty to Red Skull.
2	2	"Avengers Assemble!" / "Red Skull of Despair"; Transliteration: "Zetsubō no Akai Dokuro" (Japanese: 絶望の赤いドクロ)	Ryū King	Yoshiaki Kawajiri	July 29, 2017
Makoto escapes Avengers Tower and flies towards Hydra's base. The Avengers quickly dispatch Hydra's foot soldiers. Red Skull appears, clad in nanomachine armor, and begins to overpower the Avengers. Makoto arrives, and after he and Iron Man realize the nanomachines must be being controlled remotely, the two go to shut them down while the others battle Red Skull. As they storm the facility, Makoto finds his friends and asks Bruno to join them; Bruno refuses, as Hydra are the only ones who can keep his mechanical body from shutting down. Iron Man hacks Hydra's systems, opening the cells and shutting down the nanomachines. The Avengers defeat Red Skull, but the base's self-destruct is activated with the teens still inside.
3	3	"The Red Skull Conspiracy" / "Red Skull Scramble"; Transliteration: "Reddo Sukaru Sōdatsusen" (Japanese: レッド・スカル争奪戦)	Ryū King	Yoshiaki Kawajiri	August 5, 2017
Iron Man rescues the teens from the exploding base, while Bruno is caught in the blast and Makoto manifests emerald wings. The Avengers begin to suspect Makoto is tied to the Emerald Rain Project. The team is assigned as security during Red Skull's transfer to the Raft, accompanied by Makoto. Before they can interrogate him, the transport is attacked by the Winter Soldier, who has orders to eliminate Red Skull. The Avengers are able to drive him off with Makoto's help. Afterwards, Makoto demands to join the team, wanting to become a hero to honor Bruno's memory. Seeing the teens' resolve, and hoping to learn more about the Emerald Rain Project, the Avengers decide to train them to become heroes.
4	4	"Future Avengers: Assemble!" / "Makoto's Rebellion!?"; Transliteration: "Makoto-tachi no Hanran!?" (Japanese: マコトたちの反乱!?)	Ryū King	Yūzō Satō	August 12, 2017
The Avengers pursue leads on the Emerald Rain Project and Winter Soldier, who is accosted by the Masters of Evil for his failure. Makoto, believing the Avengers are not taking their training seriously, convinces Chloe and Adi to sneak out and look for opportunities to practice their heroics around New York City. The three end up entertaining a group of local school children. When Avengers Tower comes under attack by Ares, the trainees stay to protect the kids, while their teacher, revealed to be Captain Marvel, leaves to confront the threat. When the school begins to fall apart, Makoto's Emerald powers manifest, allowing him to keep the kids safe. Iron Man, Hulk, and Captain Marvel defeat Ares, but Winter Soldier retrieves him before he can be captured. Later, Stark gives the trainees his new Visco gauntlets, capable of deploying their own weapons and battle armor, and Makoto dubs them the "Future Avengers".
5	5	"Iron Fist" / "Unexplored City K'un-L'un"; Transliteration: "Hikyō Toshi Kun Run" (Japanese: 秘境都市クン・ルン)	Mitsutaka Hirota	Yoshiaki Kawajiri	August 19, 2017
Thor and the Future Avengers are invited by Iron Fist to the hidden city of K'un-L'un, as its elders have important information for the Avengers. While waiting to meet with the elders, Thor requests Iron Fist train the Future Avengers. He accepts, and has the three undergo a rigorous training regimen, using various chores to build their strength and refine their techniques. The elders tell Thor of a vision they received of cursed rain from green clouds and a light not yet strong enough to repel them, which Thor believes refers to the Emerald Rain Project and the Future Avengers. Enchantress infiltrates the city and animates its statues to attack. Using the lessons they learned, the Future Avengers help Thor and Iron Fist destroy the statues as Enchantress makes her escape.
6	6	"Secret Past of Iron Man" / "Hero Qualification"; Transliteration: "Hīrō no Shikaku" (Japanese: ヒーローの資格)	Fumi Tsubota	Yoshiaki Kawajiri	August 26, 2017
Adi continues to have difficulty coping with the atrocities he committed for Hydra, believing himself unworthy of being a hero. Ezekiel Stane issues a challenge to Iron Man, seeking to avenge his father, the Iron Monger. The Future Avengers learn of Stark's previous history in weapons development, upsetting Adi. Stane threatens to destroy the city with several unmanned Iron Monger suits, forcing Stark to accept his challenge while the Avengers protect civilians, with Adi rescuing a trapped girl. During the battle, Iron Man admits his guilt over his past mistakes, but refuses to let them define him, and defeats Stane. After the battle, Stark and Captain America reassure Adi that his past doesn't prevent him from becoming a hero.
7	7	"Here Comes Deadpool!" / "I'm Here! Deadpool"; Transliteration: "Kitaze! Deddopūru" (Japanese: 来たぜ！デッドプール)	Hiroshi Aoyama	Tohru Ishida	September 2, 2017
While the Avengers investigate reports of black market superweapons, the Future Avengers are left behind on standby. Makoto's complaining is interrupted by the sudden arrival of Deadpool, who gave the Avengers false information to lure them away from the tower. Learning that he plans to steal the blueprints for Iron Man's new armor, the Future Avengers attempt to stop him, to no avail. Deadpool retrieves the blueprints and summons his client, Crossbones, to the tower. Learning that Crossbones' promise to get Deadpool his own anime was a lie, Deadpool turns on him and protects the Future Avengers long enough for the Avengers to return and take Crossbones down.
8	8	"Super Soldier: Steve Rogers" / "Cap's Distant Past"; Transliteration: "Kyappu no Tōi Kako" (Japanese: キャップの遠い過去)	Ryū King	Junichi Sakata	September 9, 2017
Captain America interrupts the team preparing him a surprise birthday party, and tells the Future Avengers about his origins. Makoto's Emerald powers manifest again, as he receives a vision of Bruno alive on Hydra's island. There, the Masters of Evil have revived him using Red Skull's nanomachines, and the Leader explains they are the ones behind the Emerald Rain Project, which Bruno and Makoto were test subjects for. The Avengers fly to the island to investigate and engage the Masters of Evil. Bruno's awakening powers cause Makoto's to manifest as well, and he flies after them. During the battle, Captain America discovers Winter Soldier is his old friend Bucky Barnes, and Bruno begins fighting for the Masters, wanting to prove himself stronger than Makoto. He and Makoto engage each other, and their powers resonating causes Makoto's to spiral out of control, causing a massive explosion while the Masters escape.
9	9	"Who is the Winter Soldier?" / "Winter Soldier's Identity"; Transliteration: "W Sorujā no Shōtai" (Japanese: W・ソルジャーの正体)	Ryū King	Kenichi Kawamura	September 16, 2017
The Avengers are presumed dead in the explosion. In their absence, Captain Marvel, Hawkeye and Black Widow are dispatched to stop an attack by the Masters of Evil, who have kidnapped a team of scientists to complete the Emerald Rain Project. The heroes are overwhelmed and captured, and the Leader reveals the Emerald Rain Project is a plan to create a crystal from refined vibranium that creates new superhumans whose powers can be controlled. The Avengers suddenly arrive, having survived thanks to Captain Marvel absorbing the energy of Makoto's explosion and releasing it to fake their demise and deceive the Masters. With their schemes exposed, the Masters retreat, but Winter Soldier stays behind and has a confrontation with Captain America. Overwhelmed by his memories conflicting with his reprogramming, Winter Soldier escapes, but Captain America refuses to give up on his friend.
10	10	"Black Panther" / "Black Panther Protecting the Kingdom"; Transliteration: "Ōkoku o Mamorishi Kuro Hyō" (Japanese: 王国を守りし黒ヒョウ)	Fumi Tsubota	Hiroshi Aoyama	September 23, 2017
Knowing the Masters of Evil are gathering vibranium, Stark contacts Black Panther to investigate, but the king refuses to allow any outsiders into Wakanda. Stark convinces Black Panther to let the two meet in person. Chloe secretly stows away on the jet and disguises herself as a Wakandan guard upon arrival. Her cover is blown during Stark and Black Panther's meeting, and she calls out Black Panther on his selfishness before being imprisoned. Impressed by Chloe's bravery and loyalty, Black Panther releases her. Black Panther and Iron Man investigate reports of an intruder in a vibranium processing facility, and Adi analyzes the cameras to find footage of Klaw. Black Panther pursues him, and though Klaw at first has the upper hand, Chloe and Iron Man arrive to help defeat him. Black Panther thanks them and promises an alliance between the Avengers and Wakanda.
11	11	"The Rampaging Hulk" / "Hulk's Mysterious Rampage"; Transliteration: "Nazo no Haruku Bōsō" (Japanese: 謎のハルク暴走)	Mitsutaka Hirota	Yoshiaki Kawajiri	September 30, 2017
During an attack by the Green Goblin, Hulk is exposed to a mind-altering gas that sends him into an uncontrollable rage. Tony equips his Hulkbuster armor to subdue Hulk while the others pursue Goblin, aided by the arrival of Spider-Man. Goblin escapes, and in his civilian identity as Norman Osborn, he uses the destruction to gain support for a Superhero Regulation bill. Hulk blames himself and decides to leave the team for everyone's protection. A week later, as the bill is about to be voted on, Makoto and Wasp travel to a forest in Canada, where Hulk is currently isolating. Hulk still refuses to return, so they opt to stay with him. The bill subsequently passes into law, and Adi and Chloe are attacked by Goblin, escaping with Spider-Man's help.
12	12	"Spider-Man to the Rescue" / "Hero Regulation Law Passed"; Transliteration: "Hīrō Kiseihō Kaketsu" (Japanese: ヒーロー規制法可決)	Mitsutaka Hirota	Yoshiaki Kawajiri	October 7, 2017
Osborn celebrates the law's passage, as it will hinder heroes' ability to stop him from causing chaos as the Green Goblin. Stark's armors are confiscated by the government, while the Avengers' political ally Councilman Reiner seeks the law's repeal. Several opponents of the law find themselves caught in unexplained accidents. Suspecting Osborn is working with the Goblin, Adi, Chloe, and Spider-Man decide to investigate Osborn. Reiner finds himself attacked by the Green Goblin, but is rescued by the heroes. After gathering sufficient evidence, they interrupt a press conference with Osborn at Oscorp Tower and expose him as the Green Goblin. In the forest, Makoto, Hulk, and Wasp work together to extinguish a forest fire. Reassured of his own heroism, and learning of Osborn's deception, Hulk agrees to return home and stop him.
13	13	"Green Goblin VS. The Hulk" / "Green Monster VS Green Giant"; Transliteration: "Midori no Kaibutsu VS Midori no Kyojin" (Japanese: 緑の怪物VS緑の巨人)	Toshimitsu Takeuchi	Yoshiaki Kawajiri	October 14, 2017
With the truth revealed, Osborn retreats to his office, pursued by Spider-Man. Osborn hijacks the Hulkbuster armor and begins attacking the city. Spider-Man struggles to defend the civilians, while Stark is unable to remotely take control of the armor. Hulk arrives in time to help Spider-Man, and engages the Hulkbuster in battle. Goblin attempts to use the mind-altering gas on Hulk again, but Hulk resists its effects. Hulk and Makoto force Goblin underground into an abandoned subway tunnel, and Adi electrocutes the Hulkbuster using the third rail, stunning it and allowing Stark to hack in and force Goblin to eject. Goblin attempts to escape, but is caught by Spider-Man. In the aftermath, Osborn is imprisoned, the Superhero Regulation law is repealed, and Hulk is hailed as a hero.
14	14	"The Flight of the Falcon" / "Unstoppable Ultra High-Speed Flight"; Transliteration: "Tomarenai Chō Kōsoku Hikō" (Japanese: 止まれない超高速飛行)	Toshimitsu Takeuchi	Hiroshi Aoyama	October 21, 2017
While taking his new booster pack for a test flight, followed by the Avengers in the Avenjet, Iron Man loses control of its systems. The Leader announces he has hacked the booster pack, which will overload and explode. Adi uses his powers to pause the detonation, but admits it will still explode if Iron Man slows down. Makoto is sent to fly after Iron Man and destroy the booster's control module. His attempt is hindered when Bruno appears and attacks him, but he is saved by the arrival of Falcon. With Falcon's encouragement, Makoto uses his Emerald power to catch up to Iron Man while Bruno is called back to base. Adi's power gives out, but Makoto manages to disarm the booster just before it explodes. Returning to Avengers Tower, the Avengers grant the Future Avengers their own codenames. Makoto and Adi are dubbed "Hurricane" and "Codec", but Chloe declines, wanting to earn her codename first.
15	15	"Ms. Marvel" / "Another Transforming Girl"; Transliteration: "Mō Ichi Nin no Henshin Shōjo" (Japanese: もう一人の変身少女)	Fumi Tsubota	Kenichi Kawamura	October 28, 2017
A doppelgänger of Captain Marvel with stretching powers is seen preventing crimes around New Jersey. With the Avengers busy, the Future Avengers decide to investigate the imposter, and they bait the fake Captain Marvel into an encounter. Chloe discovers the fake's true identity as Kamala Khan, who gained powers from an unknown mist and sought to be like her idol Captain Marvel, and the two become friends. Kamala's hometown is later attacked by a pack of alligators. She and Chloe investigate and discover the alligators are being controlled by the Inventor. The Inventor sends the enormous "Big Alligator" to attack them, which rampages through town, but Makoto and Adi arrive to help. Seeing a family in trouble, Kamala sheds her disguise and saves them, creating her own hero identity as Ms. Marvel. She and Chloe take down Big Alligator and the Inventor with help from the arriving Captain Marvel, who commends Ms. Marvel for her bravery and gives Chloe the codename "Charade".
16	16	"Operation Rescue Winter Soldier" / "Winter Soldier Rescue Battle"; Transliteration: "W Sorujā Kyūshutsusen" (Japanese: W・ソルジャー救出戦)	Ryū King	Junichi Sakata	November 4, 2017
After failing to stop the Masters of Evil from stealing a supply of vibranium, the Avengers learn from a radio transmission that the Masters and Hydra are holding Winter Soldier in Russia for further reprogramming. Encouraged by Makoto, Captain America decides to go alone. Upon arriving, Captain America finds Hydra's hidden lab, where Bucky is resisting Arnim Zola's brainwashing. Captain America frees Bucky, and the two take down Zola's henchmen. The Winter Guard arrive and assist before knocking Captain America out. When he regains consciousness, Red Guardian explains that the Winter Soldier is a wanted criminal and that they are using Captain America as bait to lure him. Bucky surrenders himself in exchange for Captain America's release, and the two share a heartfelt goodbye.
17	17	"Finding Hydra's Comrades" / "Find Hydra's Collaborators"; Transliteration: "Hidora no Kyōryokusha o Sagase" (Japanese: ヒドラの協力者を探せ)	Ryū King	Yoshiaki Kawajiri	November 11, 2017
As he is being transported, Captain America is fired upon by the Russian military, and escapes into the wilderness. The Winter Guard search for a list of active Hydra agents, but find themselves under surprise attack. Realizing their superior General Brushov is an undercover Hydra agent, Red Guardian flees with Darkstar. They are rescued by Captain America, who insists they need Winter Soldier's help. As they are surrounded by Arnim Zola's tank platoon, Bucky arrives to assist them, revealing he was released by Hydra in a vain attempt to win his loyalty. Captain America obtains the list from Zola, and Crimson Dynamo and Ursa Major reveal they have also survived. Brushov holds a conference claiming the Winter Guard were killed by Hydra, planning to replace them with more Winter Soldiers, but the Winter Guard and Avengers arrive and expose him, defeating his supersoldiers. Later, Bucky declines to come home with Captain America, deciding he still needs to atone for his actions.
18	18	"It's Deadpool, Again" / "See You Again Deadpool"; Transliteration: "Mata Kayo Deddopūru" (Japanese: またかよデッドプール)	Mitsutaka Hirota	Hiroshi Kōjina	November 18, 2017
The Leader hires Deadpool to abduct Makoto, and he makes several failed attempts to infiltrate Avengers Tower. Makoto finds Deadpool and lets him in, then sneaks out with him while the Avengers are in a meeting, hoping to figure out what he's up to. The Avengers try to follow, but are led astray by a decoy. Deadpool eventually drops his friendly act and takes Makoto to the Leader. To help the Avengers find him, Makoto uses surveillance cameras on the street to send them directions. Upon arrival, the Leader absorbs some of Makoto's Emerald power into a vibranium crystal, creating an Emerald Crystal, but they are interrupted by the Avengers' arrival. The Leader hires Deadpool to fight them, but Captain America causes the Leader to drop the crystal, which is caught by Deadpool. Its power transforms him into the nonviolent Zenpool, and he returns the crystal to the Leader before departing, to everyone's confusion.
19	19	"Can You Believe in Loki" / "Do You Believe in Loki!?"; Transliteration: "Roki o Shinjiru no Ka!?" (Japanese: ロキを信じるのか！？)	Toshimitsu Takeuchi	Yoshiaki Kawajiri	November 25, 2017
In Asgard, the imprisoned Loki informs Thor that the Masters of Evil have gained the ability to teleport, which he claims he can block with his magic. At Odin's request, Thor allows Loki to join the Avengers in defending several vibranium-based weapons found at an Antarctic Hydra base, though they all remain distrustful of him. Makoto has a heart-to-heart with Loki and encourages him to make peace with his brother. The Masters of Evil arrive to take the weapons, but upon opening the containers, they discover them all to be empty. The Avengers reveal that they had Black Panther release false information about the weapons stockpile to lure the Masters. Loki blocks the Masters' teleportation, forcing them into a confrontation.
20	20	"The Bond of Brothers" / "Bonds of 'Brothers'"; Transliteration: ""Kyōdai" no Kizuna" (Japanese: 『兄弟』の絆)	Toshimitsu Takeuchi	Makoto Fuchigami	December 2, 2017
The Future Avengers take on Bruno, while the Avengers and the Masters of Evil continue their battle. Out of options, the Leader infuses Ares and Enchantress with the Emerald Crystal's power, supercharging their abilities. Thor and Loki chase the escaping Leader while the others battle Ares and Enchantress. Enchantress and Ares are overwhelmed by the Emerald power and collapse. Makoto defeats Bruno, but refuses to finish him, reminding Bruno of their friendship. Overwhelmed by emotion, Bruno's Emerald power subsides and he passes out. The Leader attempts to trap Loki and Thor in their memories to turn them against each other, but Thor resists thanks to brotherly bond with Loki. However, Loki betrays Thor, revealing he is in league with the Leader and needed to steal some of Mjolnir's power for the Emerald Rain Project, and they escape.
21	21	"Conqueror Kang" / "The Worst Conqueror"; Transliteration: "Sai Kyō no Seifukusha" (Japanese: 最凶の征服者)	Ryū King	Kei Togawa	December 9, 2017
Loki and the Leader infuse a mass of Emerald Crystals with Mjolnir's power. Loki betrays the Leader and attempts to take the Crystal for himself, but is stopped by the true leader of the Masters of Evil, Kang the Conqueror. A giant Kang descends to New York and announces his plan: The Emerald Rain Project's purpose is to reverse-engineer the Terrigen Crystal that empowers the Inhumans, who oppose him in the future. With vibranium being over-mined in 3000 AD, he traveled back in time to collect samples with the Masters' aid. He now plans to use it to release emerald rain onto the city, which will kill most of the population while the survivors will gain superpowers and be under his control. The Avengers and Captain Marvel launch an attack on Kang, while the Future Avengers work to rescue civilians. The Avengers are unable to damage Kang, and he defeats them. Bruno wakes and informs Makoto that the Crystal is aboard Kang's Time Fortress Throne in space.
22	22	"The Darkest Hour" / "Absolute Fortress"; Transliteration: "Zettai Yōsai" (Japanese: 絶対要塞)	Fumi Tsubota	Yoshiaki Kawajiri	December 16, 2017
Adi uses his powers to hack into the satellites around Earth and locate Kang's ship. The Avengers attempt to stop Kang once more, joined by Black Widow, Hawkeye, and Falcon, but prove ineffective. The Future Avengers take the Avenjet to the ship's location, leaving Bruno behind to recover, and land aboard. As they enter, Kang leads them to the Crystals where he is waiting for them, revealing the giant on Earth is an illusion. Though he attempts to convince them that his rule will grant humanity salvation, the Future Avengers refute him and attempt in vain to fight back. Kang's attempt to finish them is blocked by Bruno, who stowed away on the ship. Bruno and Makoto combine their powers, knocking Kang into the Crystals and dispersing his illusion on Earth. With the city safe for the moment, the Avengers rush to the ship and rescue the Future Avengers. As the Future Avengers return to Earth, they overhear Kang using his powers to send the Avengers into the past.
23	23	"Out of Time" / "Makoto's Time Travel"; Transliteration: "Toki o Kakeru Makoto" (Japanese: 時をかけるマコト)	Mitsutaka Hirota	Yūzō Satō	December 23, 2017
Hawkeye brings the Future Avengers and Bruno to the Sanctum Sanctorum, where Doctor Strange agrees to send Makoto to 6th-century England to retrieve the time-displaced Avengers. When he arrives, Makoto finds the Avengers, but several monsters created by Morgan le Fay attack them before being driven off by Merlin's magic. Merlin explains that King Arthur was injured in battle, and has requested the Avengers stay to protect the kingdom from le Fay while he recovers. Makoto successfully draws Arthur's magic sword, the Ebony Blade, which responds to Makoto's Emerald power, and begins training in its use. The Avengers build an armored train that they use to storm le Fay's stronghold. Makoto uses the Ebony Blade to overcome le Fay's magic and defeat her. With the kingdom safe, Makoto and the Avengers return to the present.
24	24	"Operation Barrier Breakthrough" / "Barrier Breakthrough Strategy!"; Transliteration: "Baria Toppa Sakusen!" (Japanese: バリア突破作戦！)	Ryū King	Junichi Sakata	January 6, 2018
Falcon attempts to launch an assault on Kang's ship, but is repelled by an impenetrable energy shield. Makoto and Bruno speculate that the barrier and their Emerald powers are similar, and that they could pierce through. Loki escape's Kang's prison and contacts them, confirming their theory, and offers to help. Bruno attempts to attack the barrier alone to make up for his past, but Makoto insists on joining him. Loki drains the power from the Crystals, weakening the barrier, but is found and subdued by Kang. Makoto and Bruno charge their Emerald power and fly to the ship, attacking the barrier. Their attempt fails, but the other heroes arrive to encourage them. Makoto combines his and Bruno's powers to create a massive explosion.
25	25	"The Final Fateful Battle" / "The Fated Final Battle"; Transliteration: "Unmei no Saishū Kessen!" (Japanese: 運命の最終決戦！)	Ryū King	Yoshiaki Kawajiri	January 13, 2018
Makoto's attack breaks through the barrier, and the heroes storm Kang's ship. Kang uses a time portal to bring his troops from the future. Adi takes control of the Hulkbuster armor, and the Future Avengers stay behind to repel Kang's forces while the Avengers go after Kang. Doctor Strange uses his portals to transport more heroes from Earth to help the Future Avengers. Kang traps the Avengers in an illusion of the ruined future Earth and nearly defeats them, but Wasp plants a device on Kang's throne so Iron Man can hack into it. The other heroes defeat Kang's troops and head for the Crystal room, while the Future Avengers discover the imprisoned Loki and are attacked by a giant robot. Iron Man realizes Kang's future technology is based on his own base code and successfully hacks it, removing Kang's defenses.
26	26	"The Future Avengers" / "The Future Avengers"; Transliteration: "Mirai no Abenjāzu" (Japanese: 未来のアベンジャーズ)	Ryū King	Yoshiaki Kawajiri	January 20, 2018
The Future Avengers release Loki and destroy Kang's robot. With his technology disabled, Kang is overwhelmed by the Avengers, and Hulk destroys the Emerald Crystals. Kang attempts to teleport away, but is blocked by Loki as he and the others arrive. Kang reveals the ship is set to self-destruct, and it begins to plummet towards the planet. Iron Man attempts to shut down the self-destruct sequence while the others evacuate. He successfully programs the ship to teleport back to the future moments before impact, and uses Kang's teleporter to reach the Avenjet. Kang swears vengeance moments before being caught in the explosion. Later, as New York rebuilds, Loki sneaks away and the Leader attempts to assassinate Makoto and Bruno, but is stopped by the Winter Soldier. The Inhumans Medusa and Lockjaw report to their king, Black Bolt, about the destruction of the Emerald Crystal. With his friendship with Makoto reaffirmed, Bruno is welcomed into the Future Avengers under the codename "Twister".

=== Season 2 ===
No. overall	No. in season	Dub Title / English translation Original Japanese title	Written by	Storyboards	Original release date
27	1	"Visco's Rebellion" / "Visco's Rebellion!?"; Transliteration: "Visuko no Hanran!?" (Japanese: ヴィスコの反乱！？)	Ryū King	Akira Mano	July 30, 2018
In this clip show, while the Avengers sleep, Makoto's Visco AI gains access to restricted files, causing it to evolve. Now able to physically interact with objects, Visco decides to upgrade itself to keep Makoto safe from harm. As a result, Visco becomes a giant and absorbs Makoto, harnessing his Emerald power, and begins rampaging through the city. The Avengers attempt to stop Visco, but each one is defeated in short order. Realizing Visco has been infected by the research data he collected on Kang, Iron Man attempts to shut Visco down. Visco blasts Iron Man, but he is saved by the manifestation of F.R.I.D.A.Y., who claims to have similarly evolved. F.R.I.D.A.Y. destroys Visco and herself from within using a virus. In his grief, Tony suddenly wakes up and realizes the whole experience was a dream.
28	2	"Infiltration Black Market Auction" / "Infiltrate! Dark Auction"; Transliteration: "Sennyū! Yami Ōkushon" (Japanese: 潜入！闇オークション)	Mitsutaka Hirota	Kenichi Shimizu	August 6, 2018
Chloe, Wasp, and Black Widow infiltrate the Star Bright cruise liner, where several villains are holding a black market auction, on a tip that the destructive "Stone of Infinite Power" is one of the items up for bidding. They find the ship guarded by B.A.D. Girls, Inc., defeating and disguising themselves as the villains. The three split up to search, careful not to alarm any of the other passengers, but discover the stone is already gone from the hold and will need to be obtained during the auction. A guard finds the defeated BAD Girls Inc., blowing the Avengers' cover, and they realize all the passengers are villains. The heroes take down the villains, spotting the stone in the middle of the battle. The Hood attempts to escape with it, but Wasp snatches it from him, and the villains are taken into custody. Later, Thor confirms the object is an Infinity Stone stolen from Asgard and takes it back, while the others enjoy the rest of the cruise.
29	3	"Here Comes Hawkeye" / "With Nyan? Hawkeye"; Transliteration: "Nyanto? Hōkuai" (Japanese: ニャンと？ホークアイ)	Toshimitsu Takeuchi	Junichi Sakata	August 13, 2018
While returning from a jog, Hawkeye finds an injured kitten encased in metal armor on his doorstep. He calls Adi, and the two do their best to nurse the cat back to health. As Hawkeye isn't good with animals, Adi agrees to help out, on the condition that Hawkeye train him. Hawkeye accepts, and the two take care of the kitten while training together, eventually naming him Slingshot. Adi has Slinghot's armor analyzed, and creates new armor for him that resembles Iron Man's. Seeing a news report about a black van abducting animals, Slingshot flies into a rage and takes off. Realizing Slingshot and the incidents are connected, Hawkeye and Adi track him and give chase. They find Slingshot in a sewer, where the Inventor has been taking the stolen animals for experimentation to turn them into weapons. The Inventor deploys a giant armored rat, but Hawkeye, Adi and Slingshot work together to defeat it and capture the Inventor.
30	4	"The Boy Who Draws Monsters" / "The Boy Drawing a Monster Picture"; Transliteration: "Kaijū no e o Egaku Shōnen" (Japanese: 怪獣の絵を描く少年)	Toshimitsu Takeuchi	Yoshiaki Kawajiri	August 20, 2018
Makoto meets and befriends Kei Kawade, nicknamed "Kid Kaiju" for his love of drawing kaiju. The future Avengers witness a kaiju attack in the city and attempt to stop it. A second kaiju appears and begins fighting the first one, and Makoto realizes the newcomer is the same kaiju from Kei's sketchbook. The attacking kaiju retreats, while Kei's kaiju disappears. The Avengers receive more reports of kaiju attacking various power facilities and draining their energy. Realizing Kei was sighted near multiple kaiju incidents, the Avengers decide to investigate, though Makoto asserts Kei's innocence and goes looking on his own. Makoto eventually finds Kei, but the Avengers interrupt them, believing Kei is responsible for the incidents. Kei opens his sketchbook, releasing the kaiju Slizzik in an attempt to escape. The Avengers attack Slizzik, leading Kei to release Scragg, Mekara, Aegis and Hi-Vo to protect them. Makoto convinces the kaiju to stand down, preventing a battle with the Avengers.
31	5	"The Great Kaiju Showdown" / "Great Monster Battle!"; Transliteration: "Kaijū Dai Kessen!" (Japanese: 怪獣大決戦！)	Toshimitsu Takeuchi	Yoshiaki Kawajiri	August 27, 2018
The kaiju properly introduce themselves to the Avengers, explaining that Kei unexpectedly gained the power to bring his drawings to life years ago, forcing him to live in hiding due to others misunderstanding his kaiju. The Avengers apologize for their misjudgment, and decide to focus on the evil kaiju, which are found to be of alien origin. The alien kaiju attack a nearby power plant. The Avengers leave to stop them, but Kei and his kaiju insist on helping. The two groups work together to take down the aliens, only for their leader, the Leviathan, to arrive and absorb the collected energy into itself. To prove kaiju can be good, Kei's kaiju battle the Leviathan alone, but neither they nor the Avengers can defeat it. Inspired by Makoto, Kei combines all his kaiju into a new beast, Smasher, that shares all their powers. Smasher overpowers the Leviathan, and Iron Man strikes its weak spot, destroying it. In the aftermath, Stark gives Kei and his kaiju a private island to live in peace.
32	6	"The Mystery Mist" / "Mystery Mist and Talented People"; Transliteration: "Nazo no Misuto to Nōryokusha" (Japanese: 謎のミストと能力者)	Mitsutaka Hirota	Makoto Fuchigami; Yūzō Satō	September 3, 2018
The Avengers investigate a glacier appearing in the harbor, finding new villain Blizzard attacking members of his former gang for betraying him. Blizzard escapes, and the Avengers learn he obtained his powers from the same mist as Kamala. Believing there is a connection, Chloe invites Kamala to Avengers Tower, where Stark has F.R.I.D.A.Y. discreetly analyze a strand of her hair. While Chloe returns Kamala home for curfew, the others respond to another attack by Blizzard. The heroes manage to trap Blizzard in his own ice, but are interrupted when MODOK appears. He attacks them and allows Blizzard to escape, leading the Avengers to suspect A.I.M. to be behind the mist. F.R.I.D.A.Y.'s analysis reveals Kamala's genes were mutated by the mist and she is no longer human, and Stark decides to have Chloe keep an eye on her.
33	7	"The Hunt for A.I.M." / "Find the Evil Organization AIM"; Transliteration: "Aku no Soshiki AIM o Sagase" (Japanese: 悪の組織AIMを探せ)	Ryū King	Junichi Sakata	September 10, 2018
Chloe poses as a student at Kamala's school to watch over her, enjoying the opportunity to experience normal student life. Reports of people manifesting powers due to the mist increase across the world, with some abusing them while others struggle to cope with the changes. A group of Avengers infiltrate A.I.M.'s lab, finding they have kidnapped several of the afflicted. MODOK deploys the Super-Adaptoid to stop them, which defeats the Avengers by copying their abilities, and they are captured. The others search for the captives, with Makoto tracking Bruno to A.I.M's Antarctic base by sensing his Emerald power. Ariana, a popular student who bullies Kamala, releases footage online exposing Kamala's secret identity, but the other students come to her defense. Ariana is exposed to the mist, granting her electric powers. Dubbing herself Kaboom, she attacks Kamala at her home, forcing Kamala to reveal her secret to her parents to protect them.
34	8	"The Super-Adaptoid Strikes" / "Replication!? Power of Justice"; Transliteration: "Fukusei!? Seigi no Pawā" (Japanese: 複製！？正義のパワー)	Mitsutaka Hirota	Kenichi Kawamura	September 17, 2018
MODOK reveals to the captive Avengers that A.I.M. did not create the mist, having kidnapped the afflicted to study its effects. The other Avengers arrive and confront the Super Adaptoid while Makoto and Chloe free the prisoners. MODOK reveals a second Adaptoid, forcing Makoto and Bruno to use their Emerald powers. The Adaptoids attempt to copy their abilities, but the Emerald power overwhelms and destroys them, along with A.I.M.'s base. The Avengers return the afflicted to New York, but learn that Blizzard attacked the city while they were away, leading the World Security Council to treat all the afflicted as dangerous and begin detaining them, including Kamala. The Avengers' opinions are split on whether to hand over the afflicted. Chloe tries to sneak Kamala out of police custody, but they are found and cornered by government agents. The Avengers' attempt to rescue her is waylaid by MODOK, who attacks with more Adaptoids, but the Inhuman royal family appear and destroy them.
35	9	"Arrival of the Inhumans" / "Inhumans Visit"; Transliteration: "Inhyūmanzu Sanjō" (Japanese: インヒューマンズ参上)	Ryū King	Kenichi Shimizu	September 24, 2018
The Inhumans offer to help rescue Chloe and Kamala, with Lockjaw teleporting them all to their location. The Inhumans declare they will be taking custody of Kamala and the Future Avengers, forcing the Avengers into a fight when they resist. Medusa eventually tells Chloe and Kamala that they will come when the two are ready, and the Inhumans teleport away. Later, as tensions rise between the afflicted and the government, Stark and Captain America debate the WSC's decision with Councilman Reiner. Reiner agrees to release the afflicted on the condition that Kamala be detained, believing the symbolism of her arrest will assuage the WSC. Kamala overhears and turns herself in. Makoto is contacted by the Inhuman Crystal, who offers him asylum in the lunar city of Attilan; he declines, but other afflicted agree to do so. The Avengers learn that Kamala has been sent to the Raft; Black Bolt breaks in and frees her, returning her to Avengers Tower. Disappointed by the Avengers' response to the crisis, Chloe leaves for Attilan with Kamala and Black Bolt.
36	10	"Lunar City Attilan" / "The City on the Moon Attilan"; Transliteration: "Getsumen Toshi Atiran" (Japanese: 月面都市アティラン)	Mitsutaka Hirota	Junichi Sakata	October 1, 2018
Chloe and Kamala adapt to life on Attilan. On Earth, the Avengers search for clues as to who is spreading the mist while Stark continues to negotiate with the WSC. Visco is upgraded so that the Future Avengers can communicate with Chloe. As time passes, Kamala and Chloe realize how badly they miss their friends and family, as do the other afflicted. Chloe agrees to arrange a meeting between the Avengers and Black Bolt so that they might find the mist's source and the afflicted can return to Earth. Stark, Captain America, Black Bolt, and Medusa meet in a remote wasteland on Earth, but they are ambushed by the WSC's forces, who injure Medusa. Believing they have been betrayed, Black Bolt swears vengeance and escapes with Medusa. Black Bolt's brother Maximus, secretly responsible for the ambush and the mist spreading, declares war on Earth and warns the Inhumans will attack in 48 hours.
37	11	"The Rage of Black Bolt" / "Showdown! Black Bolt"; Transliteration: "Taiketsu! Burakku Boruto" (Japanese: 対決！ブラックボルト)	Ryū King	Yoshiaki Kawajiri	October 8, 2018
Maximus plots to reveal evidence of the Avengers' innocence after Black Bolt destroys them so that he will be judged as unfit to rule. The afflicted are persecuted by the Inhumans, but Crystal allows the afflicted to stay at the palace. Kamala begs Crystal to help her and Chloe stop the war, but she remains reluctant. The Avengers train and upgrade their equipment to prepare for the impending attack. The Inhuman royal family land on Earth, and the Avengers attempt to negotiate for peace once more, but Black Bolt refuses. The Avengers engage the Inhumans, but Makoto and Black Bolt both hold back during a clash. Realizing their shared desire for peace is genuine, Black Bolt stands down. Maximus forcibly teleports Lockjaw away, preventing the royals' return, and imprisons him with Kamala and Chloe before announcing that Black Bolt was killed by the Avengers to ensure the invasion continues. As Maximus's armada launches, Medusa wakes and informs Crystal that Black Bolt is alive. Crystal finds Chloe and Kamala and asks them for help stopping Maximus.
38	12	"The Maximus Armada" / "Advance! Maximus Armada"; Transliteration: "Shingun! Makushimasu Kantai" (Japanese: 進軍！マクシマス艦隊)	Ryū King	Yoshiaki Kawajiri	October 15, 2018
Chloe and Kamala inform Crystal of Maximus's plot, and she releases them. Realizing Maximus's treachery, the Avengers and Inhuman royals defend Avengers Tower against the Armada's missile assault. Crystal has Chloe and Kamala impersonate Black Bolt and Medusa to fool the Inhumans, halting the attack. Maximus's guards storm the throne room and Kamala accidentally undoes her disguise while fighting them off. The real Medusa arrives and reveals the truth. The Inhumans on Attilan and the Armada hear Black Bolt's voice, confirming Medusa's words and causing them to turn back. Black Bolt destroys Maximus's flagship, but Maximus and his loyalists continue in escape pods and enter Earth's atmosphere.
39	13	"The Avengers: Last Stand" / "At the End of the Battle"; Transliteration: "Tatakai no Hate ni" (Japanese: 戦いの果てに)	Ryū King	Yūzō Satō	October 22, 2018
Aided by the other heroes, the Avengers and Inhumans intercept Maximus's forces as they land at Avengers Tower. Lockjaw breaks the seal on his teleportation, and he transports Chloe, Kamala, and Crystal to Earth to help. Working together, the heroes take down the invaders. Maximus uses his psychic powers to pit Makoto and Bruno against each other, but they overcome it and finish him together. Later, the afflicted return from Attilan, and a ceremony is held to formalize mankind's alliance with the Inhumans. Maximus infiltrates the ceremony, planning to release Terrigen mist into the audience, but he is prevented by Loki, who hands him over to Black Bolt to repay his debt to the Avengers. The Future Avengers are promoted to full-fledged Avengers members, and they all leave together to stop a prison break at the Raft.

== Reception ==
Melissa Camacho of Common Sense Media gave Marvel Future Avengers a grade of 3 out of 5 stars, complimented the depiction of positive messages and role models, citing the opposition between good and evil as a major theme, writing, "Fun youthful Avenger anime series has fantasy violence." Gab Hernandez of Screen Rant included Marvel Future Avengers in their "10 Best Superhero Anime Based On Marvel" list.

Kristy Ambrose of Game Rant ranked Marvel Future Avengers 9th in their "16 Best Superhero Anime" list, asserting, "This is a fun superhero anime to watch just for the visuals no matter what." Sage Ashford of Comic Book Resources ranked Marvel Future Avengers 9th in their "10 Best Anime Based On Properties That Didn't Originate In Japan" list, saying, "Fans of the Marvel Universe will find tons to love here, as each episode has a different set of Marvel characters making an appearance."

== In other media ==
A Marvel Future Avengers manga series by Teruaki Mizuno ran from April 2017 to February 2018 in Shogakukan's CoroCoro Comic Special magazine. The Future Avengers also starred in backup stories printed in the Future Fight Firsts comic miniseries, published by Marvel Comics in October 2019.

== See also ==
- Marvel Anime
- Marvel Disk Wars: The Avengers
