= Darkstar (Marvel Comics) =

Laynia Petrovna Krylova Darkstar
- The Laynia Petrovna version of Darkstar

Publication information
- Publisher: Marvel Comics
- First appearance: The Champions #7 (August 1976)
- Created by: Jenny Blake Isabella (writer); George Tuska (artist)

In-story information
- Alter ego: Laynia Petrovna Krylova
- Species: Human mutant
- Team affiliations: X-Corporation; Soviet Super-Soldiers; Winter Guard; Siberforce; Champions of Los Angeles; Exiles (Earth-616); KGB
- Partnerships: Vanguard; Titanium Man; Crimson Dynamo; Griffin
- Notable aliases: Tyomnaya Zvyezda (Russian translation of codename); Formerly "Great Beast"
- Abilities: Darkforce manipulation granting: Energy constructs projection; Teleportation; Flight; Skilled hand-to-hand combatant

Darkstar is the name of three characters appearing in American comic books published by Marvel Comics. Created by Jenny Blake Isabella and George Tuska, the Laynia Petrovna Krylova version of Darkstar first appeared in The Champions #7 (August 1976).

Darkstar is a Russian mutant, a subspecies of humans born with superhuman abilities. Darkstar can manipulate the Darkforce, an extradimensional energy form. She has been depicted as a member of various super-teams in her career, including X-Corporation and Champions of Los Angeles.

== Publication history ==
Darkstar (Laynia Petrovna) first appeared in The Champions #7 (Aug. 1976), and was created by Jenny Blake Isabella and George Tuska.

She became a regular character in Champions for the remainder of the series' brief run, though she never joined the titular supergroup. A memo from series writer Bill Mantlo revealed that he intended for her to be a "floating" member who would come and go from the book as the occasion called for.

Sasha Roerich first appeared in Hulk (Vol. 2) #1 (January, 2008), making nine appearances before dying in Hulk: Winter Guard #1 (December, 2009). Sasha was overtaken by Reena Stanicoff, debuting in the issue of her death. She appeared in five issues before dying in Darkstar and the Winter Guard #3 (August, 2010).

== Fictional character biography ==
=== Laynia Petrovna ===
Laynia Petrovna and her twin brother Nikolai Krylenko are born in Minsk. After growing up, she becomes a special operative, working for the Soviet government.

Darkstar is a member of a Soviet super-team recruited to bring Black Widow back to the USSR. However, she decides to switch sides and then fights alongside the Champions. She helps the Champions on a few more missions before returning to Russia.

Darkstar becomes a member of the Soviet Super-Soldiers with her brother Vanguard (Nikolai Krylenko) and the Crimson Dynamo (Dmitri Bukharin). The Soviet Super-Soldiers battle Iron Man and Jack of Hearts on the Moon but wind up helping them against renegade Rigellians led by Commander Arcturus.

Later, Darkstar and Vanguard are sent along with new Soviet Super-Soldier Ursa Major by the KGB to defeat Presence. They learned that Sergei is their father and that Professor Phobos has exploited the Super-Soldiers. Darkstar helps free Sergei and Tania Belinsky's Red Guardian, and defeats Phobos.

Darkstar, Vanguard, and Ursa Major defect to the United States seeking political asylum. They arrive at Avengers Island to ask for Captain America's help. They are beaten nearly to death by the Supreme Soviets, who had disguised themselves as members of the Avengers. The comatose subconscious minds of the Super-Soldiers form a "Great Beast" that follows the Supreme Soviets back to the USSR and tries to kill them. Captain America convinces the Great Beast to back off, leading to the recovery of the Super-Soldiers.

When the Supreme Soviets (who changed their name to People's Protectorate) are rechristened the Winter Guard, Darkstar is recruited back into the team. When the team disbanded, Darkstar and Vanguard join the Russian mutant team Siberforce.

Darkstar joins the Paris branch of X-Corporation in France, in which she is possessed by Weapon XII, a creation of the Weapon Plus project, and subsequently killed by Fantomex. She is temporarily resurrected through the Transmode Virus to serve in Selene's army of deceased mutants during their assault on Utopia.

A Dire Wraith who assumed the form of Darkstar's successor Reena Stanicoff is overwhelmed and taken over by Darkforce energy. Petrovna seizes control of the creature and resurrects herself. She reunites with her brother Vanguard and returns to active duty alongside her brother and Ursa Major.

=== Sasha Roerich ===
A new, red-haired Darkstar named Sasha Roerich who is genetically modeled to resemble Petrovna first appears as a member of the Winter Guard. After being altered again by Presence, she is transformed into a tentacled Darkforce beast, which is killed by Red Guardian.

=== Reena Stanicoff ===
With Sasha's death, Reena Stanicoff takes over the role. She is killed during an attack on Winter Guard headquarters by a Dire Wraith who assumes her form.

== Powers and abilities ==
The Laynia Petrovna version of Darkstar is a mutant who has the psionic power to access the extradimensional energy of the Darkforce Dimension, which grants her several superhuman abilities. She is connected to the dimension by splitting her consciousness between her physical body and its Darkforce representation, both symbiotically linked. She can utilize the Darkforce for various purposes, such as causing Darkforce to behave like either matter or energy. Furthermore, she can project Darkforce as simple, mentally-controlled solid objects, possessing the density of steel, such as pincers, rings, columns, and spheres, or as a beam of concussive force. If Darkstar is rendered unconscious, any Darkforce constructs of her making immediately dissipate. Darkstar can teleport herself and up to three others by opening a portal into the Darkforce Dimension and traveling through it; the maximum distance she can teleport has never been revealed. Because crossing the Darkforce Dimension disorients her sense of direction, and the light of Earth blinds her for several seconds upon reemergence, traveling in this manner is risky. Darkstar can levitate herself and fly at subsonic speeds by generating a virtually invisible portal into the Darkforce Dimension along the contours of her body without passing through it, then balancing the attractive force of the dimension against that of the Earth's gravity. Darkstar is a skilled hand-to-hand combatant, having been trained by the KGB and Black Widow. She is fluent in both Russian and English.

The Sasha Roerich and Reena Stanicoff version of Darkstar also possess Darkforce manipulation abilities.

=== Equipment ===
While the original Darkstar's costume was designed by the Soviet government and was made of a synthetic stretch fabric insulated against the cold, the other two Darkstar costumes are composed of Darkforce material.

== Reception ==
=== Critical reception ===
Deirdre Kaye of Scary Mommy called Darkstar a "role model" and "truly heroic." Bradley Prom of Screen Rant included Darkstar in their "10 Best Black Widow Comics Characters Not Yet In The MCU" list. Kara Hedash of The Mary Sue ranked Darkstar 5th in their "7 Female Superheroes Who Should Join Marvel’s Cinematic Universe" list. CBR.com ranked Darkstar 5th in their "Black Widow: 10 Most Powerful Russians In Comics", 9th in "Marvel: 10 Famous Heroes From The 70s That Have Been Forgotten", and 4th in "15 Strongest Mutants Who Refuse to Join the X-Men, Ranked".

== In other media ==
=== Television ===
- The Laynia Petrovna incarnation of Darkstar appears in the X-Men: The Animated Series episode "Red Dawn", voiced by Elizabeth Rukavina. This version can manipulate energy instead of the Darkforce.
  - The Laynia Petrovna incarnation of Darkstar makes a non-speaking cameo appearance in the X-Men '97 episode "Tolerance is Extinction – Part 3". By this time, she has joined the Winter Guard.
- The Laynia Petrovna incarnation of Darkstar appears in the Avengers Assemble episode "Secret Avengers", voiced by Laura Bailey. This version is a member of the Winter Guard.
- Darkstar appears in Marvel Future Avengers, voiced by Eri Saito in the Japanese version and by Kari Wahlgren in the English dub. This version is a member of the Winter Guard.

=== Video games ===
- The Laynia Petrovna incarnation of Darkstar appears as a playable character in Lego Marvel Super Heroes 2.

=== Other ===
Marvel Legends released a Darkstar figure in the Ursa Major BAF wave.
