= Titanic Three =

Fictional comic book group

Publication information
- Publisher: Marvel Comics
- First appearance: Avengers #130
- Created by: Steve Englehart (writer); Sal Buscema (artist)

In-story information
- Member(s): Titanium Man; Radioactive Man; Crimson Dynamo

The Titanic Three is a fictional team appearing in American comic books published by Marvel Comics. The team consisted of 3 supervillains: Titanium Man, Radioactive Man and Crimson Dynamo. While the Radioactive Man was a Chinese super-villain, the other members of the team were from the Soviet Union. Thus the team was one of the several reflections of the Cold War in the Marvel Universe.

== Fictional team history ==
Acting as free-agent crime fighters in Vietnam, the trio were duped by a con man and petty thief called the Slasher. They battled four Avengers: Thor, Iron Man, the Vision, and Hawkeye. Once the deception was revealed, the battle ended. After a humiliating defeat by Kang the Conqueror, the group finally disbanded when the Crimson Dynamo decided to leave to fight Iron Man.
