= Devastator (comics) =

Marvel comic book characters

Publication information
- Publisher: Marvel Comics
- First appearance: (Petrovna): The Incredible Hulk vol. 2 #186 (April 1975) (Larionov): Rom #44 (July 1983)
- Created by: (Petrovna): Len Wein and Herb Trimpe (Larionov): Bill Mantlo and Sal Buscema

In-story information
- Alter ego: Kirov Petrovna; Gregori Larionov
- Species: Human
- Team affiliations: Soviet Super-Soldiers
- Notable aliases: (Petrovna): Peter Kirkman

Devastator is a name used by three fictional characters appearing in American comic books published by Marvel Comics.

== Fictional character biography ==
=== Devastator (Kirov Petrovna) ===
The first Devastator is Kirov Petrovna, a Soviet officer and spy who utilizes a suit of power armor designed by the Gremlin. As Devastator, Petrovna infiltrates the Hulkbuster base in New Mexico and attempts to destroy it. During an ensuing battle with the Hulk, Devastator is killed when the Hulk redirects his energy back into his suit, incinerating him.

=== Devastator (Gregori Larionov) ===
The second Devastator is Gregori Larionov, a Soviet officer who utilizes a version of the Devastator suit re-built by Soviet scientists using Gremlin's notes. After Gremlin defects to the United States, Larionov and the Soviet Super-Troopers are sent to kill him. Devastator is defeated by Gremlin, Rom, and Starshine, and his satellite power source is destroyed.

=== Unnamed Devastator ===
In Avengers World, a third, unnamed Devastator appears as a member of S.P.E.A.R.'s Ascendants.

== Powers and abilities ==
The Devastator power armor was designed by the Gremlin. This full body armor is equipped with electronic devices which absorb microwave energy and can convert it for use as blasts of heat or concussive force. Its solar powered boot jets enable the wearer to fly at just under Mach 1, with range limited only by available light and the suit's three-hour battery reserve. The gauntlets contain microwave projectors that generate devastating force blasts. Because the battle-suit draws power from microwave energy beamed down from a satellite located in geosynchronous orbit, the suit's wearer must maintain a line-of-sight position relative to the satellite to avoid sudden power cut-off. The satellite itself was protected by ECMs which rendered it invisible to conventional modes of detection.

The second Devastator also possesses extensive hand-to-hand combat training, while the original possessed limited hand-to-hand combat training.
