= Winter Guard =

Fictional comic book group

- Textless cover of Darkstar and the Winter Guard #1 (June 2010). Art by Clayton Henry

Publication information
- Publisher: Marvel Comics
- First appearance: Iron Man (vol. 2) #9 (October 1998)
- Created by: Kurt Busiek; Sean Chen

In-story information
- Member(s): Crimson Dynamo; Darkstar; Red Guardian; Ursa Major; Fantasia; Powersurge; Sibercat; Sputnik; Vanguard; Red Widow

The Winter Guard (Russian: Зимняя Гвардия, romanized: Zimnyaya Gvardiya) is a fictional team of Russian superheroes appearing in American comic books published by Marvel Comics.

The Winter Guard are noted for being "Russia's answer to the Avengers". Several members of the group formerly belonged to the Soviet Super-Soldiers, the People's Protectorate, and the Supreme Soviets. Unlike those teams, which were often adversarial towards other costumed superheroes, the Winter Guard is much more heroic and representative in nature.

Unlike other superhero teams, the Winter Guard currently has a rotating pool of candidates to fill one of three roles on the team: Darkstar, Crimson Dynamo, and Red Guardian.

== Publication history ==
The Winter Guard first appeared during the Kurt Busiek run of Iron Man in (vol. 2) #9 (October 1998), where they had several guest appearances. They would later appear in Busiek's stint on the Avengers.

The team made infrequent appearances in the Marvel Universe before being featured in Jeph Loeb's Hulk (vol. 2). The Winter Guard soon appeared in She-Hulk and War Machine: Weapon of S.H.I.E.L.D..

David Gallaher brought the team back in Hulk: Winter Guard which first appeared as a Marvel Digital Comic and was later reprinted as a comic book. Gallaher returned to writing the team with a three-issue limited series called Darkstar and the Winter Guard in 2010.

== Fictional team history ==
The Winter Guard were originally known as the Soviet Super Soldiers and appeared in various comics from the mid-1970s. That name lost meaning following the collapse of the Soviet Union in 1992. The Winter Guard made their debut with that name in Iron Man (vol. 3) #9, and fought alongside the Avengers during the "Maximum Security" and "Kang Dynasty" events.

Whilst investigating the murder of the Abomination, Doc Samson, She-Hulk, and Thunderbolt Ross encounter the revitalized Winter Guard, consisting of Ursa Major, Red Guardian, Darkstar, and Crimson Dynamo. The Winter Guard are apparently killed by the Intelligencia, but are later revealed to have survived.

The Winter Guard is later reassembled with Ursa Major, Crimson Dynamo, Red Guardian, Darkstar, Vostok, Perun, Chernobog, and Red Widow.

== Members ==
Current members

- Ursa Major (Mikhail Ursus) – A mutant who can transform into a humanoid bear.
- Crimson Dynamo (Dmitri Bukharin) – Russia's answer to the Iron Man armor. Bukharin is the current leader of the Winter Guard.
- Darkstar (Laynia Petrovna) – A mutant who can manipulate the Darkforce.
- Red Guardian (Nikolai Krylenko) – Also known as Vanguard, Krylenko formerly led the Winter Guard as Red Guardian. He is Darkstar's brother and possesses the mutant ability to generate force fields.
- Vostok – A robot who can manipulate other machines. Also known as Sputnik.
- Chernobog - The Slavic god of chaos and the night.
- Perun - The Slavic god of thunder and lightning.
- Red Widow - The product of the same Red Room as Black Widow, Red Widow is the team's contact with the Russian government and has been known to overrule Crimson Dynamo's leadership on this basis.

=== Previous members ===
- Darkstar (Sasha Roerich) – A short-lived replacement for Darkstar who was given her powers.
- Darkstar (Reena Stancioff) – The third Darkstar, who was killed by a Dire Wraith.
- Steel Guardian (Josef Petkus) – Russia's counterpart to Captain America.
- Fantasma – A sorceress and illusion-caster. Also known as Fantasia. She is later revealed to be a Dire Wraith.
- Powersurge (Illarion Ramskov) – A nuclear-fueled giant who sacrificed his life to destroy the Russian supervillain Presence.
- Sibercat (Illich Lavrov) – A feline mutant.
- Crimson Dynamo (Galina Nemirovsky) – The thirteenth Crimson Dynamo and a graduate of the Federal Dynamo program.
- Crimson Dynamo (Boris Vadim)

== Collected editions ==
Title	Material collected	Published date	ISBN
Darkstar and the Winter Guard	Darkstar and the Winter Guard #1–3, Hulk: Winter Guard #1, X-Men Unlimited #28	November 2010	978-0785148678
Winter Guard: Operation Snowblind	Winter Guard #1-4, Widowmakers: Red Guardian and Yelena Belova #1	January 2022	978-1302928759

== In other media ==
=== Television ===
- The Winter Guard appears in the Avengers Assemble episode "Secret Avengers", consisting of Red Guardian, Darkstar, Crimson Dynamo, Ursa Major, and Radioactive Man. This version of the group work for Central Command, S.H.I.E.L.D.'s Russian counterpart.
- The Winter Guard appears in Marvel Future Avengers, consisting of Red Guardian, Darkstar, Crimson Dynamo, and Ursa Major.
- The Winter Guard appears in the X-Men '97 episode "Tolerance is Extinction – Part 3", consisting of Darkstar, Crimson Dynamo, and Omega Red.

=== Video games ===
- The Winter Guard appear as playable characters in Lego Marvel Super Heroes 2.
- The Winter Guard appears in Marvel Strike Force, consisting of Alexei Shostakov / Red Guardian, Darkstar, Ursa Major, Omega Red, and Yelena Belova.

=== Miscellaneous ===
- The Winter Guard appears in The Avengers: Earth's Mightiest Heroes #2, consisting of Vanguard, Darkstar, Ursa Major, and Titanium Man.
- The Winter Guard appears in X-Men '92, consisting of Ursa Major, Omega Red, Darkstar, Vostok, and Red Guardian.
