= Crimson Dynamo =

Comic book characters

Crimson Dynamo (Russian: Багровое Динамо, Bagrovoe Dinamo; also Красное Динамо (Krasnoe Dinamo)) is the name of several characters appearing in American comic books published by Marvel Comics who have all been powered armor–wearing Russian or Soviet agents who have clashed with the superhero Iron Man over the course of his heroic career.

== Publication history ==
The Anton Vanko incarnation of Crimson Dynamo first appeared in Tales of Suspense #46 (October 1963), and was created by writer Stan Lee and artist Don Heck.

The Boris Turgenov incarnation of Crimson Dynamo first appeared in Tales of Suspense #52 (April 1964), and was created by Stan Lee, Don Heck, and Don Rico.

The Alex Nevsky incarnation of Crimson Dynamo first appeared in Iron Man #15 (July 1969), and was created by Archie Goodwin and George Tuska.

The Yuri Petrovich incarnation of Crimson Dynamo first appeared in The Champions #7 (August 1976), and was created by George Tuska and Tony Isabella.

The Dimitri Bukharin incarnation of Crimson Dynamo first appeared in Iron Man #109 (April 1978), and was created by writer Bill Mantlo and artist Carmine Infantino.

The Valentin Shatalov incarnation of Crimson Dynamo first appeared in Iron Man #255 (April 1990), and was created by Glenn Herdling, Fabian Nicieza, and Herb Trimpe.

The seventh Crimson Dynamo first appeared in Captain America (vol. 3) #42 (April 2001), and was created by Dan Jurgens.

The Gennady Gavrilov incarnation of Crimson Dynamo first appeared in Crimson Dynamo #1 (October 2003), and was created by John Jackson Miller and Steve Ellis.

The ninth Crimson Dynamo first appeared in Secret War #3 (October 2004), and was created by Brian Michael Bendis and Gabriele Dell'Otto.

The tenth Crimson Dynamo first appeared in Iron Man (vol. 4) #7 (June 2006), and was created by Daniel Knauf, Charles Knauf, and Patrick Zircher.

The Boris Vadim incarnation of Crimson Dynamo first appeared in Hulk (vol. 2) #1 (March 2008), and was created by Jeph Loeb and Ed McGuinness.

The Galina Nemirovsky incarnation of Crimson Dynamo first appeared in Hulk: Winter Guard #1 (February 2010), and was created by Steve Ellis and David Gallaher.

== Fictional character biography ==
=== Anton Vanko ===
Crimson Dynamo
- Anton Vanko as the original Crimson Dynamo; Art by Don Heck.

Publication information
- Publisher: Marvel Comics
- First appearance: Tales of Suspense #46 (October 1963)
- Created by: Stan Lee; Don Heck

In-story information
- Alter ego: Anton Vanko
- Species: Human
- Place of origin: Earth-616
- Notable aliases: Ivan Vanko
- Abilities: Armored suit grants: Superhuman strength and durability Flight via boot jets Hand-blasters; Small missiles on the back shoulder area Computer and radio transmitter and receiver

Anton Vanko (Russian: Анто́н Ва́нко, Armenian: Անտոն Վանկո), the first Crimson Dynamo, was also the armor's creator. A Soviet scientist of Armenian birth with a Ph.D. in physics, Vanko was one of the world's foremost experts on electricity. At the behest of the USSR, Vanko built a powered exoskeleton capable of performing incredible feats. He also designed the Unicorn's helmet and instructed the Russian agent in its use.

As the Crimson Dynamo, Vanko was sent by the Soviet Government to sabotage Stark Industries and defeat his American counterpart Iron Man in battle. Vanko's armor allowed him to generate and control electricity in all of its forms, such as firing devastating bolts of lightning and flying using electromagnetic propulsion. Unlike Iron Man, who at the time had to regularly charge the chest plate powering his suit (and keeping him alive), the Crimson Dynamo was powered by a self-sustaining generator.

After losing to Iron Man, Vanko defected to the United States out of fear that his superiors would kill him for failing. Vanko began to work for Tony Stark as one of his chief scientists. Eventually, the two became friends and Vanko developed pride and admiration for his new home. Unfortunately, soon the Soviets came for Vanko, just as he predicted. The KGB sent their top agent Black Widow as well as Boris Turgenev to apprehend him. Vanko died saving Iron Man by firing an unstable, experimental laser pistol at Turgenev, killing himself in the process.

=== Boris Turgenov ===
Boris Turgenov, the second Crimson Dynamo, had a very short career as a supervillain. Turgenov came to the United States with the Black Widow to kill Anton Vanko, Tony Stark and Iron Man (at the time Stark kept his identity secret, with Iron Man posing as his most trusted bodyguard - Turgenov believed them to be separate people and planned to kill both). Turgenov almost carried out his mission, virtually defeating Iron Man with the stolen Crimson Dynamo suit. He was killed when Vanko sacrificed his own life for the cause of freedom by firing an experimental and unstable laser pistol at Boris. Both Vanko's heroic sacrifice and Turgenov's death were revisited in the Iron Man miniseries Enter the Mandarin, where it is revealed that Temugin (the Mandarin's son) witnessed the event.

=== Alex Nevsky ===
Crimson Dynamo
- Alex Nevsky as the third Crimson Dynamo

Publication information
- Publisher: Marvel Comics
- First appearance: Iron Man #15 (July 1969)
- Created by: Archie Goodwin; George Tuska

In-story information
- Alter ego: Alex Nevsky
- Species: Human
- Place of origin: Earth-616
- Team affiliations: Titanic Three
- Notable aliases: Alex Niven
- Abilities: Armored suit grants: Superhuman strength Flight; Invulnerability; Electric and laser blasts Smokescreen; Backpack rocket launcher

Alex Nevsky was Vanko's protege, as a scientific genius. However, his career was ruined when the Soviet government discredited Vanko after he fled to the West. Sent into exile for his association with the turncoat, Nevsky grew to hate the Soviet Union, as well as Iron Man, for besting Vanko. Nevsky sought vengeance against Tony Stark, whom Nevsky felt exploited Vanko under the American capitalist system (not knowing that Stark and Iron Man are the same person). Disguised as a new scientist Alex Niven, who was behind Cord Industries, he planned to help the struggling competitor beat out Stark Industries in the marketplace. From there, Nevsky used Crimson Dynamo armor and bested Iron Man. Finally, he worked towards undermining Tony Stark by romancing Janice Cord, Stark's girlfriend at the time and a relative of Cord Industries's CEO Edwin Cord.

After he donned the Crimson Dynamo armor in public, his old Soviet masters sent the Titanium Man to kill him. When Titanium Man killed Janice, Nevsky blamed Iron Man for the tragedy and swore to avenge her. Although he held Titanium Man just as responsible for Janice's death, Nevsky was forced by circumstance to partner with him and Radioactive Man in Vietnam, where all three Communist-aligned fugitives formed the Titanic Three. After defecting to Vietnam, Nevsky made a final attempt to kill Iron Man and was once again unsuccessful. As a result, he was found and assassinated by the KGB and they confiscated his armor for their own purposes.

"The Beginning of the End,"—Nevsky's original story arc in Iron Man #17-23—is considered one of the best Iron Man stories and, alongside Tony Stark's origin in Tales of Suspense #39, the best Iron Man story of the Silver Age of Comics.

=== Yuri Petrovich ===
Yuri Petrovich, the fourth Crimson Dynamo, first appeared in The Champions #7 (Aug. 1976) as the son of Ivan Petrovich - a friend of the Black Widow (now reformed). When Western agents (presumably Americans) failed to convince Ivan to defect to the West, they assassinated Yuri's mother; in the chaos that followed, Ivan and Yuri each believed the other dead. Yuri was brought to the West, where Soviet agents posing as Westerners indoctrinated him to hate the West. When Black Widow and Ivan defected to the United States, Yuri was "rescued" by the Soviets, returned to Russia, and trained as a KGB assassin. He was given the Crimson Dynamo armor and sent to kill the Black Widow and Ivan. Yuri and his allies (his girlfriend Darkstar, the Griffin, Rampage, and the original Titanium Man) fought the Black Widow and her teammates, the Champions. When Yuri learned of the true nature of his "Western" captors, he went berserk. Darkstar teamed up with the Champions to subdue Yuri, and after he and his other allies were defeated, Yuri was returned to Russia, convicted by the Soviet government, and exiled to a Siberian labor camp.

=== Dmitri Bukharin ===
Dmitri Bukharin as the fifth Crimson Dynamo

Dmitri Bukharin, the fifth Crimson Dynamo, was given Yuri Petrovich's armor by his masters in the KGB. He joined the Soviet Super-Soldiers, but was expelled after his teammates decided to sever their connections to the Soviet government. Afterward, he received a new, redesigned suit of armor. He later joined the Supreme Soviets, a group of superhumans who were loyal to the Soviet government; the group became the People's Protectorate after the USSR dissolved. When the new government confiscated his armor, he was given another suit and adopted the codename Airstrike. By the events of Dark Reign, however, he had returned to the identity and armor of the Crimson Dynamo, albeit as an ally of Iron Man instead of an enemy. He is currently a member of the Winter Guard, a Russian counterpart of the Avengers.

Bukharin's tenure is the longest of anyone in the Crimson Dynamo's publication history and occurred during such seminal Iron Man storylines as "Demon in a Bottle", "Doomquest", and "Armor Wars".

=== Valentin Shatalov ===
Crimson Dynamo
- Valentin Shatalov as the sixth Crimson Dynamo

Publication information
- Publisher: Marvel Comics
- First appearance: Iron Man ##255 (April 1990)
- Created by: Glenn Herdling; Fabian Nicieza; Herb Trimpe

In-story information
- Full name: Valentin Shatalov
- Species: Human
- Place of origin: Earth-616
- Team affiliations: Remont 4 Lethal Legion
- Abilities: Armored suit grants: Superhuman strength Invulnerability; Flight; Electric and laser blasters Electrical shock when touching or grappling with an opponent Gatling gun contained in right arm Missiles; A 'fusioncaster' chest beam

Valentin Shatalov, a Colonel-General in the Soviet Army and a KGB agent, is the sixth Crimson Dynamo. He used his rank to obtain the Crimson Dynamo armor from Dmitri Bukharin for his own use. He was the founder of Remont-4, a group of Russian superhumans who sought to return the Soviet Union to Stalinism. Shatalov and his allies (the cyborg Firefox and the original Unicorn among others) recruited the original Titanium Man to their cause. The Remont-4 fought the Soviet Super Soldiers and a group of Russian mutant exiles in addition to plaguing Iron Man.

In Shatalov's first appearance as the Crimson Dynamo, he was in a training session with Devastator in Russia at the same time Iron Man had encountered an out-of-control mutant dubbing himself Freak Quincy in Los Angeles. Quincy's out-of-control powers tapped into Devastator's satellite uplink from the other side of the world, and he managed to switch the minds of Stark and Shatalov. His unfamiliarity with the Iron Man armor resulted in Shatalov firing pulse bolts that destroyed Quincy's arms, although the mutant survived. After Stark and Shatalov struggled to maintain each other's identities, Shatalov was able to get the hospitalized Quincy to recreate the transmission that switched their minds. Out of respect for Stark, Shatalov did not reveal Stark's identity.

Sometime after the fall of the Soviet Union, Shatalov received an upgraded Crimson Dynamo armor. Less bulky than Bukharin's model and with silver accents, this was the first Crimson Dynamo armor that was not completely crimson. Shatalov later met Tony Stark in person, when the latter traveled to Russia to oversee the opening of the first Stark Enterprises branch in the country, and revealed to Stark that he had kept his identity as Iron Man a secret. Stark's trip to Russia was interrupted by the rampage of the Titanium Man, Boris Bullski, who still could not accept the new Russia, and saw Stark's presence in his homeland as an affront to everything he believed the U.S.S.R. stood for. As the Titanium Man fought Iron Man, Black Widow, and Crimson Dynamo, Shatalov's leg was broken. He begged Iron Man not to finish the fight with Bullski, as he felt having the American Avenger take down a former Soviet hero would be too damaging to his country's morale. Stark volunteered to wear the Dynamo armor in Shatalov's place, and with radio assistance from Shatalov and the Widow, fought Bullski. When Bullski refused to surrender, Shatalov overrode Stark's control of the Dynamo armor, firing a blast that killed Bullski. Shatalov took the fall with his superiors, who had wanted to recover Bullski alive, and he was relieved of his duties as the Crimson Dynamo.

=== Other Crimson Dynamos ===
Like many of Iron Man's Cold War-era villains, the Crimson Dynamo fell into a degree of obscurity after the dissolution of the Soviet Union. Since Shatalov, there have been seven people to bear the Crimson Dynamo mantle, almost all of them anonymous, short-lived, or otherwise unremarkable foes.

==== Crimson Dynamo VII ====
The seventh Crimson Dynamo was defeated by Nick Fury and Captain America. He wore Dmitri Bukharin's former armor, though his skill piloting it was minimal. This character is often named Gregar Valski on fan web sites, but that name has never appeared in any Marvel comic.

==== Gennady Gavrilov ====
Crimson Dynamo
- Gennady Gavrilov as the eighth Crimson Dynamo

Publication information
- Publisher: Marvel Comics
- First appearance: Crimson Dynamo #1 (October 2003)
- Created by: John Jackson Miller; Steve Ellis

In-story information
- Full name: Gennady Dmitreivich Gavrilov
- Species: Human
- Place of origin: Earth-616
- Notable aliases: Trouble Magnet, Iron Gennady, Gyena, Kulakh42
- Abilities: Armored suit

In Marvel Epic's six-issue 2003 series Crimson Dynamo, Russian collegiate Gennady Gavrilov becomes the eighth Crimson Dynamo after he finds the helmet of a "Beta unit" designed by Anton Vanko based on but improved over the original, with its very own recharging satellite in orbit. Believing the helmet to be a sophisticated gaming system, Gavrilov caused the dormant armor to awaken and make its way towards the helmet, inadvertently leaving a trail of destruction. He would eventually, if briefly, wear the entire armor in a standoff with the Russian military. He kept the armor afterward.

==== Ninth Crimson Dynamo ====
The ninth Crimson Dynamo appeared in the Secret War miniseries as a member of Lucia von Bardas's army of villains which she gathered to defeat the Avengers. This Crimson Dynamo's armor was created by the Tinkerer.

==== Tenth Crimson Dynamo ====
The tenth Crimson Dynamo is introduced in Iron Man (vol. 4) #7 (June 2006), where he is apprehended by Iron Man after attempting to rob a bank. It was later revealed that this armor had been bought on the black market and that the designs for Crimson Dynamo-based technology have been for sale for a while. This Crimson Dynamo was later slain by the Punisher.

==== Eleventh Crimson Dynamo ====
The eleventh Crimson Dynamo was a member of the "Alpha Gen Soviet Super-Soldiers", a group of Russian superhumans put into cryogenic stasis after the Cold War ended. During a fight between the Order and the Infernal Man, Order member Corona set off an enormous explosion which awakened the Super-Soldiers. This Crimson Dynamo was apparently destroyed by Order members Supernaut and Aralune.

==== Boris Vadim ====
Boris Vadim, the twelfth Crimson Dynamo, first appears in the premiere issue of Hulk vol. 2 (March 2008). A S.H.I.E.L.D.-sanctioned team consisting of Iron Man, Doc Samson and She-Hulk encounters the Winter Guard, a Russian superhero team of which Vadim is a member, while investigating the apparent murder of the Abomination in Russia. Vadim later flees to the United States seeking political asylum, joining the Red Hulk's mercenary group. Some time later, Vadim was killed by a mutated Igor Drenkov.

==== Galina Nemirovsky ====
Galina Nemirovsky replaced Boris Vadim to become the thirteenth Crimson Dynamo. She is considered by her Russian masters to be one of the best Crimson Dynamo pilots ever and was a graduate of their "Federal Dynamo" program. As Dynamo, Galina battled the Presence, the Dire Wraiths, Warlord Krang, Iron Man, and the Remont Six. Galina was apparently recruited by Mandarin and Zeke Stane to join Iron Man's other villains in a plot to take down Iron Man. Mandarin and Zeke Stane gave Galina a new Crimson Dynamo armor.

== Powers and abilities ==
The Crimson Dynamo wears an armored battle suit that serves as an exoskeleton, providing the wearer with superhuman strength and durability. The suit's outer layer was composed of a carborundum matrix alloy, and is equipped with hand-blasters that can fire high-frequency electrical bolts, small missiles contained in the back shoulder area of the battle-suit, computers and radio transmitter and receiver and boot jets that allow flight. Subsequent versions of the battle-suit have featured upgrades of various kinds, by the Gremlin and other Russian scientists. As the Crimson Dynamo, Valentin Shatalov's version of the armor was equipped with a powerful chest-mounted fusion-caster weapon.

== Other versions ==
=== Civil War: House of M ===
An alternate universe version of Yuri Petrovich / Crimson Dynamo from Earth-58163 appears in House of M as a member of the Soviet Super-Soldiers.

=== Heroes Reborn ===
An alternate universe version of Anton Vanko / Crimson Dynamo from a pocket dimension created by Franklin Richards appears in Heroes Reborn as a member of Loki's Masters of Evil.

=== Marvel Zombies ===
An unidentified alternate universe version of Crimson Dynamo from Earth-2149 appears in Marvel Zombies 2.

=== Ultimate Marvel ===
Two characters based on the Crimson Dynamo from Earth-1610 appear in the Ultimate Marvel universe: Alex Su, a Chinese member of the Liberators who was fused with his armor under unspecified circumstances and controls an army of drones; and an alternate version of Valentin Shatalov who is a government agent and the first Crimson Dynamo.

=== Ultimate Universe ===
An alternate universe version of Dimitri Bukharin / Crimson Dynamo appears in the Ultimate Universe imprint. This version was brainwashed by Directorate X and forced to hunt down the Opposition. Following the fall of the Eurasian Republic, Bukharin escapes, only to be killed by Ursa Major.

== In other media ==
=== Television ===
- The Anton Vanko and Boris Tyrgenev incarnations of the Crimson Dynamo appear in the "Iron Man" segment of The Marvel Super Heroes, voiced by Tom Harvey.
- The Yuri Petrovich incarnation of the Crimson Dynamo appears in Iron Man, voiced by William Hootkins in "Not Far from the Tree" and by Stu Rosen in "The Armor Wars". This version is a former KGB agent whose armor is made from Stark Industries technology. In the episode "Not Far from the Tree", Petrovich works with A.I.M. and a clone of Howard Stark to kill Tony Stark and take control of Stark Industries, only to be defeated by Iron Man. In "The Armor Wars", Petrovich breaks off from A.I.M. in an unsuccessful attempt to restore the Soviet Union with other former KGB agents by destroying a nuclear power plant, giving his life to do so.
- Three variations of the Crimson Dynamo appear in Iron Man: Armored Adventures.
  - In the episode "Iron Man vs. the Crimson Dynamo", the Crimson Dynamo suit is introduced as a spacewalk suit created by Project Pegasus to fix space stations and piloted by Ivan Vanko (voiced by Mark Oliver). Two years prior to the series, a station Ivan was testing the suit at was destroyed by solar flares, causing Project Pegasus to abandon him in space, but he was kept alive via a solar-powered IV drip. After crashing in New York, Ivan goes on an insanity-induced rampage, intent on destroying Project Pegasus, though Iron Man intervenes long enough for Pepper Potts to find and bring Ivan's wife and son to him. Seeing them, Ivan surrenders and allows himself to be taken in for medical treatment.
  - In "Seeing Red", Obadiah Stane acquires the Crimson Dynamo suit from Project Pegasus to redesign and upgrade it so his head of security Michael O'Brien (voiced by Brian Drummond) can pilot it. While O'Brien defeats Iron Man in the latter's regular armor, the former is defeated by Iron Man.
  - In "Enter: Iron Monger", the titular mecha destroys an automated copy of the Crimson Dynamo suit during a test run.
- The Valentin Shatalov incarnation of the Crimson Dynamo appears in The Super Hero Squad Show episode "Tales of Suspense!", voiced by Jess Harnell. This version is a member of Doctor Doom's Lethal Legion.
- The Ivan Vanko incarnation of the Crimson Dynamo appears in The Avengers: Earth's Mightiest Heroes, voiced by Chris Cox. This version is a member of the Masters of Evil.
- The Crimson Dynamo, based on the Iron Man 2 incarnation of Ivan Vanko, appears in the Avengers Assemble episode "Secret Avengers", voiced by Fred Tatasciore. This version is a member of the Winter Guard.
- The Anton Vanko incarnation of the Crimson Dynamo appears in Marvel Disk Wars: The Avengers, voiced by Tetsu Inada in the original Japanese version and by Wally Wingert in the English dub.
- The Galina Nemirovsky incarnation of the Crimson Dynamo appears in the Spider-Man episode "The Rise of Doc Ock", voiced by Laura Bailey. This version lost her family to mobsters who took her land and her family's life in Russia.
- The Dimitri Bucharin incarnation of the Crimson Dynamo appears in Marvel Future Avengers, voiced by Tetsu Inada in the original Japanese version and by Yuri Lowenthal in the English dub. This version is a member of the Winter Guard.
- The Valentin Shatalov incarnation of the Crimson Dynamo makes a non-speaking cameo appearance in the X-Men '97 episode "Tolerance is Extinction" Pt. 3.

=== Marvel Cinematic Universe ===
Anton Vanko appears in media set in the Marvel Cinematic Universe (MCU):

- Anton appears in Iron Man 2, portrayed by Yevgeni Lazarev. The father of Ivan Vanko, this version was a Russian physicist who worked alongside Howard Stark in the 1960s to invent the Arc Reactor. However, Anton was deported to the Soviet Union after stealing patents and selling them on the black market. Anton's death results in Ivan seeking revenge on Tony Stark.
- A young Anton appears in Agent Carter, portrayed by Costa Ronin.

=== Video games ===
- The Valentin Shatalov incarnation of the Crimson Dynamo appears as the final boss of The Invincible Iron Man.
- The Valentin Shatalov incarnation of the Crimson Dynamo appears as a mini-boss in Marvel: Ultimate Alliance, voiced by Robin Atkin Downes. This version is a member of Doctor Doom's Masters of Evil.
- The Valentin Shatalov incarnation of the Crimson Dynamo appears in Marvel Super Hero Squad, voiced by Jess Harnell.
- The Valentin Shatalov incarnation of the Crimson Dynamo appears in Iron Man 2, voiced by Dimitri Diatchenko. This version is an ally of A.I.M. and Roxxon. After receiving powered armor to defeat Iron Man, the Crimson Dynamo is killed by Iron Man and War Machine.
- The Boris Turgenev incarnation of the Crimson Dynamo appears as a boss in Marvel Avengers Alliance.
- The Crimson Dynamo appears as a boss in Iron Man 3: The Official Game, voiced by Jeff Bottoms.
- The Dmitri Bukharin incarnation of the Crimson Dynamo appears as a playable character in Lego Marvel's Avengers.
- The Dmitri Bukharin incarnation of the Crimson Dynamo appears as a playable character in Lego Marvel Super Heroes 2. This version is a member of the Winter Guard.
- The Anton Vanko incarnation of the Crimson Dynamo appears in Marvel Avengers Alliance 2.
- The Galina Nemirovsky incarnation of the Crimson Dynamo appears in Marvel Avengers Academy.

=== Miscellaneous ===
The Alex Nevsky incarnation of the Crimson Dynamo is referenced in Paul McCartney and Wings's song "Magneto and Titanium Man".

=== Merchandise ===
- The Dimitri Bucharin incarnation of the Crimson Dynamo received a figurine in The Classic Marvel Figurine Collection.
- The Ivan Vanko incarnation of the Crimson Dynamo, based on his Iron Man: Armored Adventures appearance, received a figure in Hasbro's tie-in toy line.
- The Valentin Shatalov incarnation of the Crimson Dynamo, based on his Iron Man animated series appearance, received a figure.
- The Valentin Shatalov incarnation of the Crimson Dynamo received two figures in the Marvel Super Hero Squad, with the first being released in the "Iron Man Face Off" four-pack alongside figures of Iron Man, War Machine, and Titanium Man; the second released in the "Crimson Dynamo Attacks" four-pack alongside two figures of Iron Man and one of War Machine; and the Dimitri Bukharin incarnation being released in the "Armor Wars: Part II" three-pack alongside figures of Iron Man and Titanium Man.
- The Dimitri Bukharin incarnation of the Crimson Dynamo received a figure in wave 36 of the Marvel Minimates line.
- The Dimitri Bucharin incarnation of the Crimson Dynamo received a figure in wave 1 of Hasbro's Iron Man 2 film tie-in line.
- The Valentin Shatalov incarnation of the Crimson Dynamo will receive a figure in wave 2 of Hasbro's Iron Man: The Armored Avenger Legends Series line.
- The Dimitri Bukharin incarnation of the Crimson Dynamo will receive a figure in the Marvel Select Line.
