= Red Guardian =

Marvel Comics character

- The Alexei Shostakov incarnation of Red Guardian as depicted in The Avengers #43 (August 1967). Art by John Buscema and George Roussos.

Publication information
- Publisher: Marvel Comics
- First appearance: Alexei Shostakov: The Avengers #43 (August 1967); Dr. Tania Belinsky: The Defenders #35 (May 1976); Nikolai Krylenko: Original character: Iron Man #109 (April 1978); As Red Guardian: Darkstar and the Winter Guard #2 (July 2010); Josef Petkus: Captain America #352 (April 1989); Aleksey Lebedev: Namor, The Sub-Mariner Annual #1 (June 1991); Captain Russia: Ultimate Nightmare #4 (December 2004); Krassno Granitsky: Maverick #10 (June 1998]]); Colonel Abdul al-Rahma: The Ultimates 2 #7 (July 2005); Anton: Hulk (vol. 2) #1 (January 2008)
- Created by: Alexei Shostakov: Roy Thomas; John Buscema; Tania Belinsky: Steve Gerber; Sal Buscema; Nikolai Krylenko: Bill Mantlo (original character); Carmine Infantino (original character); David Gallaher (as Red Guardian); Steve Ellis (as Red Guardian); Josef Petkus: Mark Gruenwald; Kieron Dwyer; Aleksey Lebedev: Dana Moreshead; Mike Thomas; Phil Hester; Captain Russia: Warren Ellis; Trevor Hairsine; Krassno Granitsky: Jorge Gonzales; Leo Fernandez; Colonel Abdul al-Rahma: Mark Millar; Bryan Hitch; Anton: Jeph Loeb; Ed McGuinness

In-story information
- Alter ego: Alexei Shostakov (Алексей Шостаков); Dr. Tania Belinsky; Josef Petkus; Aleksey Lebedev; Krassno Granitsky; Abdul al-Rahma; Anton; Nikolai Krylenko; Alexei Shostakov L.M.D.
- Species: Human; Krylenko: Human mutate; Anton: Life Model Decoy
- Team affiliations: Winter Guard; Soviet Super-Soldiers; KGB; (Shostakov) Thunderbolts
- Notable aliases: Ronin; Steel Guardian; Vanguard
- Abilities: Highly skilled athlete; Master hand to hand combatant; Expert pilot; Use of "belt-buckle" disc

The Red Guardian (Russian: Красный страж, Krasnyy Strazh) is the name of several fictional characters appearing in American comic books published by Marvel Comics: Aleksey Lebedev, Alexei Shostakov, Tania Belinsky, Josef Petkus, Krassno Granitsky, Anton Ivanov, and Nikolai Krylenko, as well as a villainous Life Model Decoy of Shostakov. The Red Guardian is an identity created as the Soviet equivalent to Captain America, although its use has continued in post-Soviet Russia. In the Ultimate Marvel continuity, the Red Guardian is adapted as two separate characters: Captain Russia and Colonel Abdul al-Rahma.

Characters based on the Red Guardian have made scattered appearances in animated media and video games; Anton Ivanov and Alexei Shostakov feature in the Marvel Cinematic Universe (MCU) franchise, portrayed by Zach McGowan and David Harbour, respectively.

== Fictional character biography ==
=== Aleksey Lebedev ===
Aleksey Lebedev (Russian: Алексей Лебедев), the Golden Age version of the Red Guardian, first appeared in Namor, The Sub-Mariner Annual #1 (June 1991) as a retcon of the history of the Red Guardian identity, establishing a version who appeared prior to the version first seen in 1967, created by writers Dana Moreshead and Mike Thomas, and artist Phil Hester. Very little is known of him, but he fought alongside Captain America (William Naslund) and the Sub-Mariner at the Potsdam Conference, in July 1945. Lebedev was apparently killed during the purges of the 1950s, opposing the brutal experiments that would later create his successor.

=== Alexei Shostakov ===
Alexei Andreevich Shostakov was born in Moscow, and was the husband of Natasha Romanova. Both he and Romanova were agents of the Soviets: Romanova as the Black Widow, while Shostakov became a test pilot and KGB agent. He was trained as a Soviet counterpart to Captain America known as Red Guardian.

During the Cold War, the KGB faked Shostakov's death and trained him in secret, keeping his survival a secret from Romanova. While Romanova became disillusioned with the KGB and defected to the United States, Red Guardian remained loyal and became more ruthless and vindictive. Red Guardian has also been a member of the Thunderbolts.

=== Tania Belinsky ===
Tania Belinsky, a neurosurgeon from the USSR later known as Starlight, initially assumes the Red Guardian identity and joins the Defenders. Created by Steve Gerber and Sal Buscema, she first appeared in The Defenders #35 (May 1976).

=== Josef Petkus ===
Josef Petkus is the fourth Red Guardian, first appearing in Captain America #352 (April 1989), and was created by writer Mark Gruenwald and artist Kieron Dwyer. The character subsequently appears in The Avengers #319–324 (July–October 1990), The Incredible Hulk #393 (May 1992), and Soviet Super-Soldiers #1 (November 1992). Petkus later appeared as the Steel Guardian in Iron Man (vol. 2) #9 (October 1998) and was included in the "Supreme Soviets" entry in the Official Handbook of the Marvel Universe Update '89 #7.

Josef Petkus is a special operative for the intelligence agencies of the Soviet Union and a member of the militant Supreme Soviets. Alongside the Supreme Soviets, he attacks the Soviet Super-Soldiers for defecting from the Soviet Union. Alongside Captain America, he later battled a bear-like creature made of Darkforce. The Supreme Soviets are later rebranded as a post-Soviet Russian super-team called the Winter Guard. Petkus later joins a Winter Guard splinter group called the People's Protectorate, now calling himself the "Steel Guardian". He and his team search for the timelord Immortus, hoping to find a way to resurrect Vanguard's sister Lanyia. They agree to fight off Dire Wraiths invading Immortus' realm in exchange for this favor; Petkus is killed in the ensuing battle.

=== Krassno Granitsky ===
Krassno Granitsky, the fifth Red Guardian, appeared in Maverick #10 (June 1998), and was created by writer Jorge Gonzales and artist Leo Fernandez. Granitsky teamed up with the mercenary superhero Maverick to battle a crime lord. He also appears in Ed Brubaker's Captain America, where he is executed by Aleksander Lukin.

=== Anton ===
Anton, the sixth Red Guardian, first appears in Jeph Loeb's Hulk series as a member of the Winter Guard. Anton claims to be an engineer and a former pilot of the Crimson Dynamo armor, and is later revealed to be a human who transferred his mind into a Life Model Decoy. He is decapitated by a Dire Wraith, although his head survives and is kept in storage.

=== Nikolai Krylenko ===
Nikolai Krylenko (also known as Vanguard) is the seventh version of the Red Guardian, and leads the Winter Guard. Created by Bill Mantlo and Carmine Infantino for Iron Man #109 (April 1978), he was redeveloped as the Red Guardian by David Gallaher and Steve Ellis from Darkstar and the Winter Guard #2 (July 2010) onward.

== Powers and abilities ==
None of the Red Guardian's various identity users have been revealed to possess superhuman powers or abilities, with the exception of Tania Belinsky after her mutation by the Presence, Ultimate Marvel versions, Krylenko, the seventh Red Guardian, and adaptations of the character to the Marvel Cinematic Universe (MCU). All are highly skilled athletes. Shostakov was an expert pilot, a master hand-to-hand combatant, and was trained in espionage techniques by the KGB.

All the Guardians but Tania have used a steel shield similar to that used by Captain America. Alexei and Tania used a "belt-buckle" disc, a hurling weapon which magnetically returned to the wearer's hand when thrown, and was a part of their costume's belt buckle. The fourth Red Guardian, Josef Petkus, often employed an energized sword as a secondary weapon alongside his shield. The sixth Red Guardian was an LMD named Anton Ivanov, whose powers are cybernetic based. His falsified backstory was that he was an expert engineer and former Crimson Dynamo pilot; his real strength lies in his moderate degree of enhanced cybernetic physicality.

Nikolai Krylenko/Vanguard is a mutant who possesses a full-body force field that repels electromagnetic and kinetic energy. He is able to direct his field through the technically advanced vibranium shield supplied to him by the Executive Security Committee. He also directs this force against the earth itself to achieve flight. Nikolai wears a more advanced suit than previous Red Guardians, which is lined with circuitry that works in conjunction with the compact computer on his shield, not only enabling the guided flight and return through their digital connection, but the amplification of his energy field.

== Other versions ==
=== Bullet Points ===
An alternate universe version of Alexei Shostakov / Red Guardian makes a minor appearance in Bullet Points #5 as one of many heroes who battle Galactus.

=== Civil War: House of M ===
An unidentified alternate universe version of Red Guardian appears in Civil War: House of M #2 as a member of the Soviet Super Soldiers.

=== Exiles ===
An alternate universe version of Alexei Shostakov / Red Guardian appears in Exiles #84.

=== Ultimate Marvel ===
Two original incarnations of Red Guardian from Earth-1610 appear in the Ultimate Marvel imprint:

==== Captain Russia ====
Captain Russia is a Russian super-soldier based on Alexei Shostakov who possesses superhuman strength and durability and wields a makeshift shield created partially from human remains. Captain Russia battles Captain America, who kills him by stabbing him through the chest.

==== Colonel Abdul al-Rahman ====
- Further reading: Colonel at the Comic Book DB (archived from the original); Colonel at the Grand Comics Database

Colonel Abdul al-Rahman is an Azerbaijani teenager and the leader of the Liberators who was transformed into a super-soldier by Russian scientists and wields a lightsaber-like weapon. As a member of the Liberators, al-Rahman operates as the Colonel. He is later killed by Captain America and Hulk.

=== Ultimate Universe ===
An alternate universe version of Alexei Shostakov, simply known as Guardian, appears in Ultimate Wolverine as a member of the Opposition, a resistance against the Rasputin family.

== In other media ==
=== Television ===
- The Nikolai Krylenko incarnation of the Red Guardian appears in the Avengers Assemble episode "Secret Avengers", voiced by Troy Baker. This version is a member of the Winter Guard.
- The Nikolai Krylenko incarnation of the Red Guardian appears in Marvel Future Avengers, voiced by Satoshi Mikami in the original Japanese version and by Fred Tatasciore in the English dub. This version is a member of the Winter Guard.
- The Alexei Shostakov incarnation of the Red Guardian appears in Lego Marvel Avengers: Code Red, voiced by Trevor Devall.

=== Marvel Cinematic Universe ===
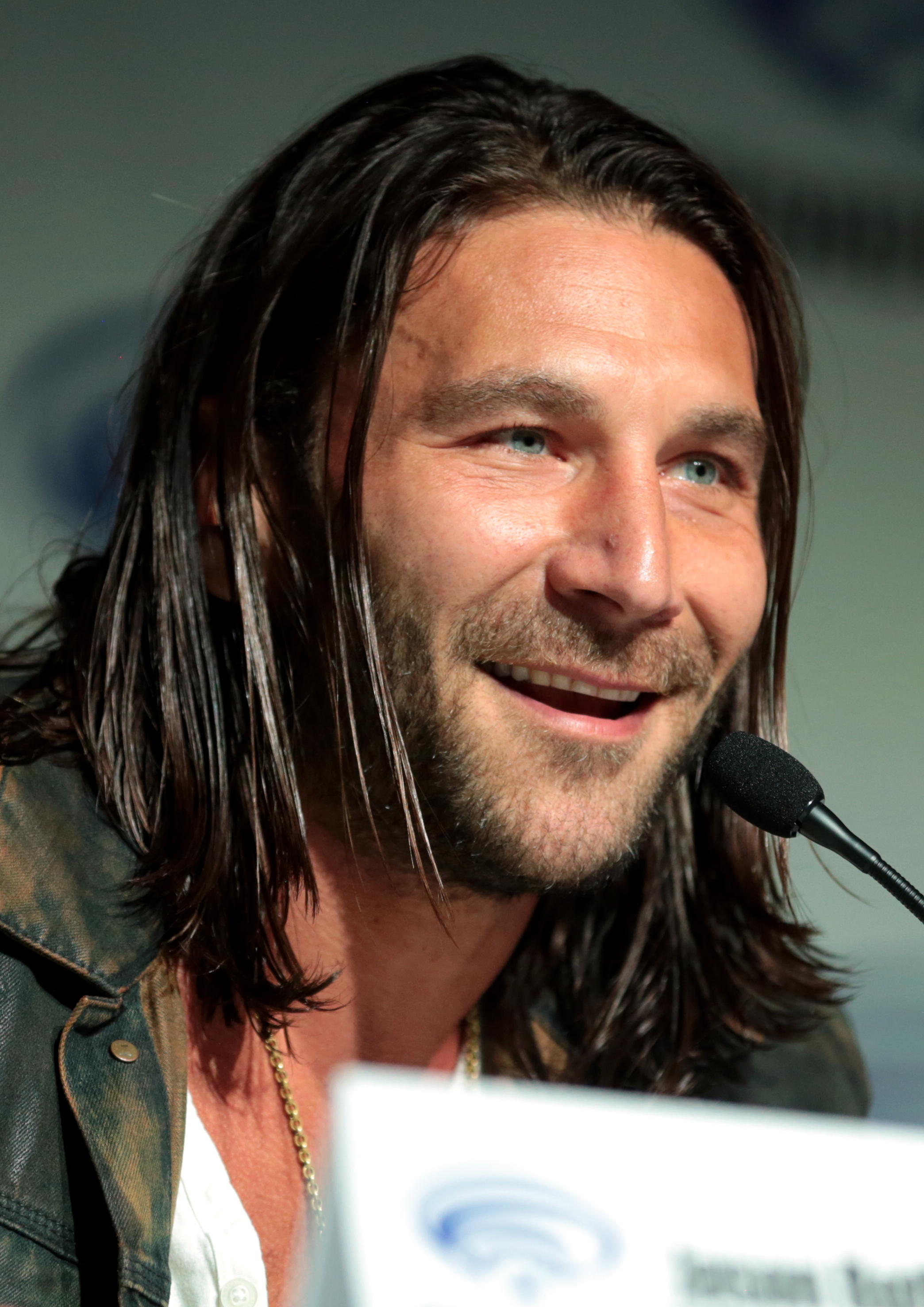
Zach McGowan promoting the fifth season of Agents of S.H.I.E.L.D. at the 2018 WonderCon.

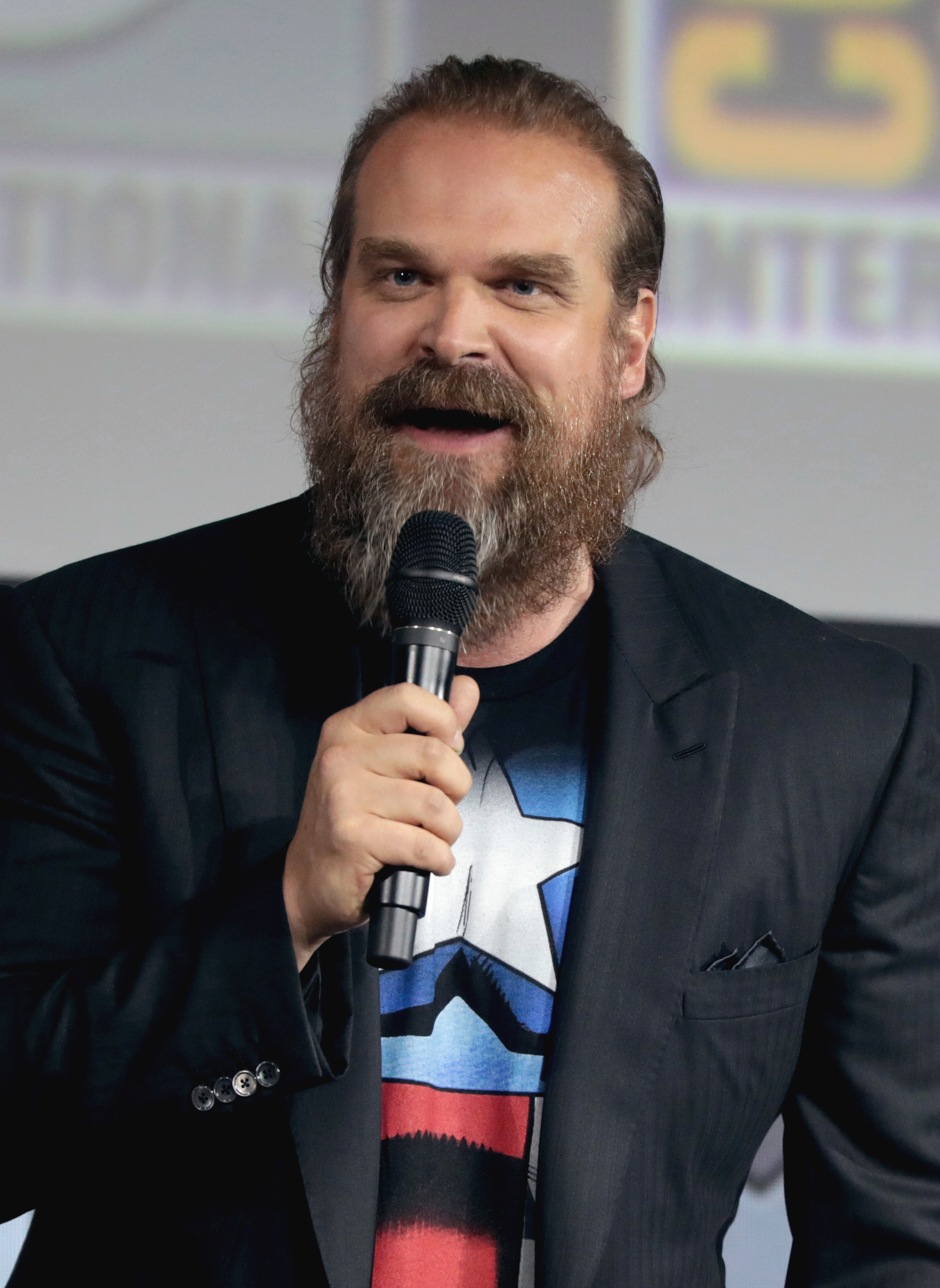
David Harbour promoting Black Widow at the 2019 San Diego Comic-Con.

Characters based on the Red Guardian appear in media set in the Marvel Cinematic Universe (MCU):

- Anton Ivanov appears in Agents of S.H.I.E.L.D. (2016–2018), portrayed by Zach McGowan. This version is a reclusive Russian industrialist known as "The Superior" who believes Inhumans to be monsters. He works with the Watchdogs, their benefactor Ellen Nadeer, and later Holden Radcliffe to fight S.H.I.E.L.D. until he is crippled by Daisy Johnson. Following this, Ivanov is decapitated by AIDA, who keeps him alive as a brain in a vat and gives him a series of Life-Model Decoys Designed Only for Killing (L-MODOKs) to remotely control. Ivanov was intended to become MODOK, but Marvel Studios retracted access to the character for use in New Warriors (2018) and Ant-Man and the Wasp: Quantumania (2023).
- The Alexei Shostakov incarnation of the Red Guardian appears in Black Widow (2021), portrayed by David Harbour. This version is the adoptive father of Natasha Romanoff and Yelena Belova. Harbour said Shostakov has "tons of cracks all over him. And he's not the heroic, noble man that [people] want him to be. He both comically and tragically has a lot of flaws". For Harbour's portrayal, he and Black Widow director Cate Shortland discussed Ricky Gervais' performance in The Office and Philip Seymour Hoffman's in The Savages, "comedy that comes out of real domestic need".
  - In Black Widow, years prior to the film's main events, Shostakov allies with General Dreykov of the Red Room, who sends him on an undercover mission to the United States alongside Melina Vostokoff, Romanoff, and Belova. After concluding the mission however, Dreykov has Shostakov incarcerated in the Seventh Circle Prison. In the present, Romanoff and Belova free Shostakov to help them and Vostokoff destroy the Red Room.
  - Alternate timeline versions of Shostakov appear in the third season of What If...? (2024), voiced by Harbour.
  - Shostakov appears in Thunderbolts* (2025). Having lost contact with Belova a year prior, Shostakov started a limousine service before helping her and others found the titular team, which is later rebranded as the New Avengers by Valentina Allegra de Fontaine.
  - An alternate universe version of Shostakov appears in Marvel Zombies (2025). He is a survivor of the zombie apocalypse who ends up joining Kamala Khan and Blade Knight in their quest for a ship to take them to space, although Shostakov becomes devastated with the loss of Melina and Yelena to the zombies. In the third episode, he inadvertently consumes zombie remains disguised by Wanda Maximoff, for which Shostakov ends up becoming a zombie.
  - Harbour will reprise his role as Shostakov in Avengers: Doomsday (2026).

=== Video games ===
- The Alexei Shostakov incarnation of the Red Guardian appears in Lego Marvel Super Heroes 2.
- The MCU incarnation of Alexei Shostakov / Red Guardian appears as a playable character in Marvel: Future Fight as part of the Black Widow film tie-in update.
- The MCU incarnation of Alexei Shostakov / Red Guardian appears as a playable character in Marvel Puzzle Quest.
- The MCU incarnation of Alexei Shostakov / Red Guardian appears as a playable character in Marvel Strike Force.
