= Soviet Super-Soldiers =

Fictional comic book group

- Soviet Super Soldiers #1 (November 1992); Cover art by Angel Medina and Jeff Albrecht

Publication information
- Publisher: Marvel Comics
- First appearance: The Incredible Hulk vol. 2 #258 (April 1981)
- Created by: Bill Mantlo; Sal Buscema

In-story information
- Member(s): List: Blind Faith Crimson Dynamo Darkstar Devastator Fantasia Gremlin Perun Red Guardian Sibercat Sputnik Stencil Ursa Major Vanguard

The Soviet Super-Soldiers (Russian: Советкие Суперсолдаты, romanized: Sovetskiye Supersoldaty) are a fictional team of super heroes appearing in American comic books published by Marvel Comics. The team first appeared in The Incredible Hulk vol. 2 #258 (April 1981). The team's storylines are a reflection of the American public's understanding of US/Soviet relations during the Cold War era.

== Fictional team history ==
The Soviet Super-Soldiers were a superteam that was brought together by the Soviet government of Russia to be the counterpart of American teams such as the Avengers and the Fantastic Four. Professor Phobos founded this government program to locate and train superhuman beings in service of the state. The school's first student was Mikhail Ursus, who became known as Ursa Major. He was soon followed by siblings Laynia Petrovna and Nikolai Krylenko, who became known as Darkstar and Vanguard, respectively. These three mutants joined with Dmitri Bukharin, the fifth Crimson Dynamo, to form the initial lineup of the Soviet Super-Soldiers.

The Super-Soldiers played an active role as a pawn in a competition between Grandmaster and Death. The Soviet government sent the Super-Soldiers to Khystym to battle the Gremlin, and then fought Rom and Starshine. Allied with Rom and Starshine, the Soviet Super-Soldiers fought the Dire Wraiths. The team became allies of the Gremlin, and took over the Dire Wraith base in Khystym as the new Soviet Super-Soldiers headquarters. The Soviet Super-Soldiers later agreed to bring Magneto to justice. They fought the Avengers, and expelled the Crimson Dynamo as he was still loyal to the KGB. The Gremlin joined the team for a time while wearing the Titanium Man armor, but he was killed in action by (Tony Stark) Iron Man.

The three mutants Vanguard, Darkstar, and Ursa Major later decided to sever their ties with the Soviet government, and arrived at Avengers Island, and asked Captain America to help them seek political asylum in America. However, the three were beaten nearly to death, captured and returned to the Soviet states by the government-sponsored Supreme Soviets, who had been joined by the Crimson Dynamo. The comatose subconscious minds of the injured Vanguard, Darkstar, and Ursa Major formed a "Great Beast" that attempted to drain the life energies of the Supreme Soviets. Captain America stopped the Beast, and Vanguard, Darkstar, and Ursa Major regained consciousness and began recovering from their injuries.

Eventually, the team took on new members Blind Faith, Stencil, Sibercat and added former members of the Supreme Soviets: the third Red Guardian, Fantasia, Perun, Sputnik and the returning Crimson Dynamo. This team became known as the Winter Guard not long afterwards.

== See also ==
- Guardians, Russian super hero film from 2017
