= Gremlin (comics) =

Fictional character appearing in Marvel Comics

- Kondrati Topolov as Titanium Man in Iron Man #229 (April 1988)

Publication information
- Publisher: Marvel Comics
- First appearance: Incredible Hulk #163 (May 1973)
- Created by: Steve Englehart; Herb Trimpe

In-story information
- Alter ego: Kondrati Yurivich Topolov
- Species: Human mutant
- Team affiliations: Soviet Super-Soldiers; Assembly; Hydra
- Notable aliases: Titanium Man; Titan
- Abilities: Superhuman intelligence; Use of advanced devices and weapons; Armored suit grants: Superhuman strength; Damage resistance; Flight; Energy blasts and constructs

The Gremlin (Kondrati Topolov) is a fictional character appearing in American comic books published by Marvel Comics. He first appeared in The Incredible Hulk #163 (May 1973).

== Concept and creation ==
Co-creator Steve Englehart recounted, "I’ve always treated the entire run of a book, up to the point that I took it over, as worthy of respect. So I was always interested in where series started out, and how they developed in their early days. The Gargoyle had indeed been in Hulk #1, so I thought it would be fun to connect to him—but I had to make something interesting for my time, not just wave at the past. I thought, ‘Gargoyle + Kremlin = Gremlin’."

== Fictional character biography ==
Kondrati Topolov is the son of Russian scientist Yuri Topolov, also known as the Gargoyle, and inherited his grotesque appearance and superhuman intelligence. However, he was born disfigured, unlike his father, who was mutated over time due to exposure to radioactive materials. Yuri was cured by a captured Bruce Banner using gamma rays and died killing other Soviets in an explosion.

A brilliant scientist like his father, Kondrati created the high-tech gear used by the Soviet Super-Troopers (the immediate precursor to the Soviet Super-Soldiers), and for a time wore the Titanium Man armor. He created Droog, an intelligent Triceratops-like creature capable of speech, through genetic engineering. As the Gremlin, he first clashed with the Hulk at the Gremlin's secret base in the Arctic. Gremlin's men then captured General "Thunderbolt" Ross.

The Hulk and Thunderbolt Ross invade the Gremlin's Bitterfrost base in Siberia to rescue Glenn Talbot. Gremlin and Droog contend with the Hulk, but Bitterfrost was destroyed by S.H.I.E.L.D. Later, the Gremlin helps defeat the alien Dire Wraiths and officially joins the Soviet Super-Soldiers.

Topolov next appears as the second Titanium Man, wearing a new version he had originally created for Boris Bullski. With the other Soviet Super-Soldiers, he contends with the X-Men and the Avengers in an attempt to capture Magneto.

During the "Armor Wars" storyline, Gremlin battles Iron Man using the Titanium Man armor. Iron Man manages to defeat the Crimson Dynamo in the fight but is unable to stop Gremlin, who destroys Iron Man's negator pack. When Iron Man attempts to escape, his booster jets ignite Gremlin's armor. The armor explodes, apparently burning Gremlin to death.

Gremlin later appears alive, having ejected from his armor prior to its destruction and worked with Hydra to kidnap and brainwash several children, including Spider-Woman's son Gerry. He blends in with Assembly by operating an armor called Titan. When Spider-Woman defeats the Gremlin at Alcatraz, he activates Titan's self-destruct sequence, causing the armor to explode. It is unknown if he survived.

== Powers and abilities ==
The Gremlin is a mutant who has inherited the immense intelligence of his father, the Gargoyle. He had completed doctoral programs in various sciences and attained mastery over many areas of technology.

=== Equipment ===
Kondrati Topolov wore the Titanium Man battlesuit that granted him tremendous strength, physical resistance, hypersonic flight, and the ability to utilize energy as weapons.

His Titan armor resembles an armored version of the Hulk and possesses super-strength.

== Other characters named Gremlin ==
- An unrelated character named Gremlin appears in Sub-Mariner #61 as an agent of Doctor Hydro and a member of the Hydro-Men who wields mind-controlling disks.
- An unrelated character named Gremlin appears in Avengers Icons: The Vision as a synthezoid and enemy of the Vision.

== In other media ==
The Gremlin makes a non-speaking cameo appearance in the X-Men: The Animated Series episode "Beyond Good and Evil (Part 4): End and Beginning" as one of Apocalypse's prisoners.
