= Starlight (Marvel Comics) =

Marvel Comics superhero

- Starlight as Red Guardian

Publication information
- Publisher: Marvel Comics
- First appearance: (As Red Guardian); The Defenders #35 (May 1976) (As Starlight); Quasar #19 (Feb 1991)
- Created by: Steve Gerber (writer); Sal Buscema (artist)

In-story information
- Alter ego: Tania Belinsky (Belinskaya)
- Team affiliations: Defenders
- Partnerships: Presence
- Notable aliases: Red Guardian; Zvezda Syvet ("Starlight" in Russian)
- Abilities: Highly skilled athlete Skilled neurosurgeon Gifted intellect Superhuman strength, stamina and durability Supersonic flight via nuclear energy generation Radiation projection As Red Guardian: Use of "belt-buckle" disc

Starlight (Russian: Звездный Свет, romanized: Zvezdnyy Svet) is a superhero appearing in American comic books published by Marvel Comics.

== Publication history ==
Created by Steve Gerber and Sal Buscema, she first appeared in The Defenders #35 (May 1976).

== Fictional character biography ==
Tania Belinskya was born in Leningrad, in the former Soviet Union. Belinskya became a young neurosurgeon, and after her dissident father Andrei had been sent to Siberia, she adopted a costume and persona similar to the original Red Guardian's, and fought crime and protected dissidents in an attempt to reform Soviet society. She left the USSR at the request of Doctor Strange to perform a brain transplant. She decided to stay in America and join the Defenders as an adventurer.

Belinskya is brought to the lab complex of Sergei Krylov, alias the "Presence", a scientific genius who had become one of the most influential men in the Soviet government. Krylov mentally dominates Belinskya, transforming her into a super-powered thrall with nuclear powers. After regaining their freedom, Belinskya takes the name Starlight and returns to Earth. However, she continues to work with the Presence, who threatened to abandon her if she did not serve as his henchwoman and lover.

At some point, after the Kang War, Starlight reduces her radioactivity enough to reintegrate within society without fear of causing death to those around her. She later joins up with other Russian heroes to form the Protectorate, serving Immortus as palace guards against the Dire Wraiths. During this time, she falls in love with her teammate Vanguard. When the team manages to banish the Dire Wraith queen back to Limbo, Starlight is sucked in along with her.

== Powers and abilities ==
As a result of mutation from cobalt radiation, Starlight has superhuman strength, stamina, and durability. She can generate nuclear energy for flight at supersonic speeds, and can project radiation blasts. Starlight gives off low levels of nuclear radiation at all times, putting humans who associate with her at risk.

Starlight is known for having a PhD in medicine and performing neurosurgery. She also has experience in hand-to-hand combat and is an athlete.
