= Ursa Major (character) =

- Art from X-Men 198 Files 0.N.E.

Publication information
- Publisher: Marvel Comics
- First appearance: The Incredible Hulk (vol. 2) #258 (April 1981)
- Created by: Bill Mantlo (writer); Sal Buscema (artist)

In-story information
- Alter ego: Mikhail Uriokovitch Ursus
- Species: Human mutant
- Team affiliations: Winter Guard; Soviet Super-Soldiers; Siberforce
- Notable aliases: Большая Медведица (Bolsaja Medvedica, "Great Bear"), Major Ursus
- Abilities: Bear transformation Superhuman strength, stamina, senses and resistance to injury Non-retractable claws

Ursa Major (Russian: Большая Медведица, romanized: Bol'shaya Medveditsa, Mikhail Uriokovitch Ursus) is a fictional character, a mutant appearing in American comic books published by Marvel Comics. The character has been depicted as a member of the Soviet Super-Soldiers.

The character appeared in the live-action Marvel Cinematic Universe film Black Widow (2021), portrayed by Olivier Richters.

== Publication history ==
Ursa Major first appeared in The Incredible Hulk (vol. 2) #258 (April 1981), and was created by writer Bill Mantlo and artist Sal Buscema.

== Fictional character biography ==
Born in Blagoveshchensk, Mikhail Ursus is one of the first known Soviet mutants to survive past childhood, due to the government killing mutants when their powers first manifested. This is because he was abandoned at a young age and grew up in the forest.

Ursus, Darkstar, and Vanguard, Piotr Phobos' best-trained students, become founding members of the Soviet Super-Soldiers, a team of government agents. After discovering Phobos' plan to spread radiation across the Soviet Union to create more mutants whose powers he could eventually siphon, the Super-Soldiers turn against him and bring him before the government to stand trial. Although the Super-Soldiers remain together as a team, they refuse to unquestioningly serve the state again. Ursa Major is one of the few mutants in the world to retain their powers after Decimation, when most mutants lost their powers.

In the storyline "Secret Empire", Ursa Major appears as a member of the Black Widow Ops Program, which cloned Black Widow following her death at the hands of Captain America's Hydra Supreme counterpart. He bribes Epsilon Red to let him add her current memories while secretly disposing of the bad programming.

== Powers and abilities ==
Ursa Major has the mutant ability to transform into a large anthropomorphic bear. While in this form, Ursa Major retains his human intelligence and capability of speech, though his personality does become more feral and he begins to lose control over his human intelligence if he remains in his transformed state for several hours consecutively. Ursa Major was trained by the Soviet military, and trained in the use of his powers by Professor Phobos, being a graduate of Phobos's mutant training school.

While transformed, Ursa Major possesses superhuman strength, stamina and resistance to physical injury to a much greater degree than an actual bear of similar size possesses. His strength is sufficient to allow him to engage in a one-on-one battle with the Hulk and survive. His senses are also heightened to a superhuman degree, particularly his sense of smell, which he can use to track a target by scent. Also, like a real bear, Ursa Major possesses non-retractable claws. These claws are relatively blunt, as they are with an actual bear, but can be used as effective weapons when coupled with his great strength.

== Other versions ==
=== Civil War: House of M ===
An alternate universe version of Ursa Major appears in Civil War: House of M #2.

=== Marvel Zombies ===
A zombified alternate universe version of Ursa Major appears in Marvel Zombies.

=== Ultimate Universe ===
An alternate universe version of Ursa Major appears in Ultimate Wolverine #13. This version was experimented on and brainwashed by Directorate X. After encountering Ursa Major and realizing the extent of his brainwashing, Wolverine decides to kill him.

== In other media ==
=== Television ===
- Ursa Major makes a non-speaking appearance in the Avengers Assemble episode "Secret Avengers" as a member of the Winter Guard.
- Ursa Major appears in Marvel Future Avengers, voiced by Kenji Nomura in Japanese and JB Blanc in English. This version is a member of the Winter Guard.

=== Film ===
Ursa Major appears in Black Widow, portrayed by Olivier Richters. This version is an inmate of the Seventh Circle prison.

=== Video games ===
Ursa Major appears in Lego Marvel Super Heroes 2 as a member of the Soviet Super-Soldiers.
