= List of monthly Zuda contestants =

This is a complete and up to date list of every creative team that has competed in Zuda Comics, DC Comics' webcomic imprint, thus far.

== Instant winners ==
- Bayou by Jeremy Love
- The Night Owls by Peter Timony and Bobby Timony
- Street-Code by Dean Haspiel
- The Imaginary Boys by Carlos López Bermúdez
- I Rule The Night by Kevin Colden
- Bottle of Awesome by Andy Belanger and Ian Herring
- La Morté Sisters by Tony Trov, Johnny Zito & Christine Larsen

== 2007 competitions ==
=== November 2007 ===
The first set of contestants was announced on Newsarama:

- Alpha Monkey by Bobbie Rubio and Howard M. Shum
- This American Strife by J. Longo
- Battlefield Babysitter by Matthew Humphreys
- Black Swan by Mulele Jarvis
- Dead in the Now by Corey Lewis
- The Dead Seas by Pop Mhan
- The Enders by Tim Smith III
- High Moon by David Gallaher and Steve Ellis (winner)
- Leprenomicon by Greg DelCurla and Fernando Ruiz
- Raining Cats and Dogs by Sho Murase

=== December 2007 ===
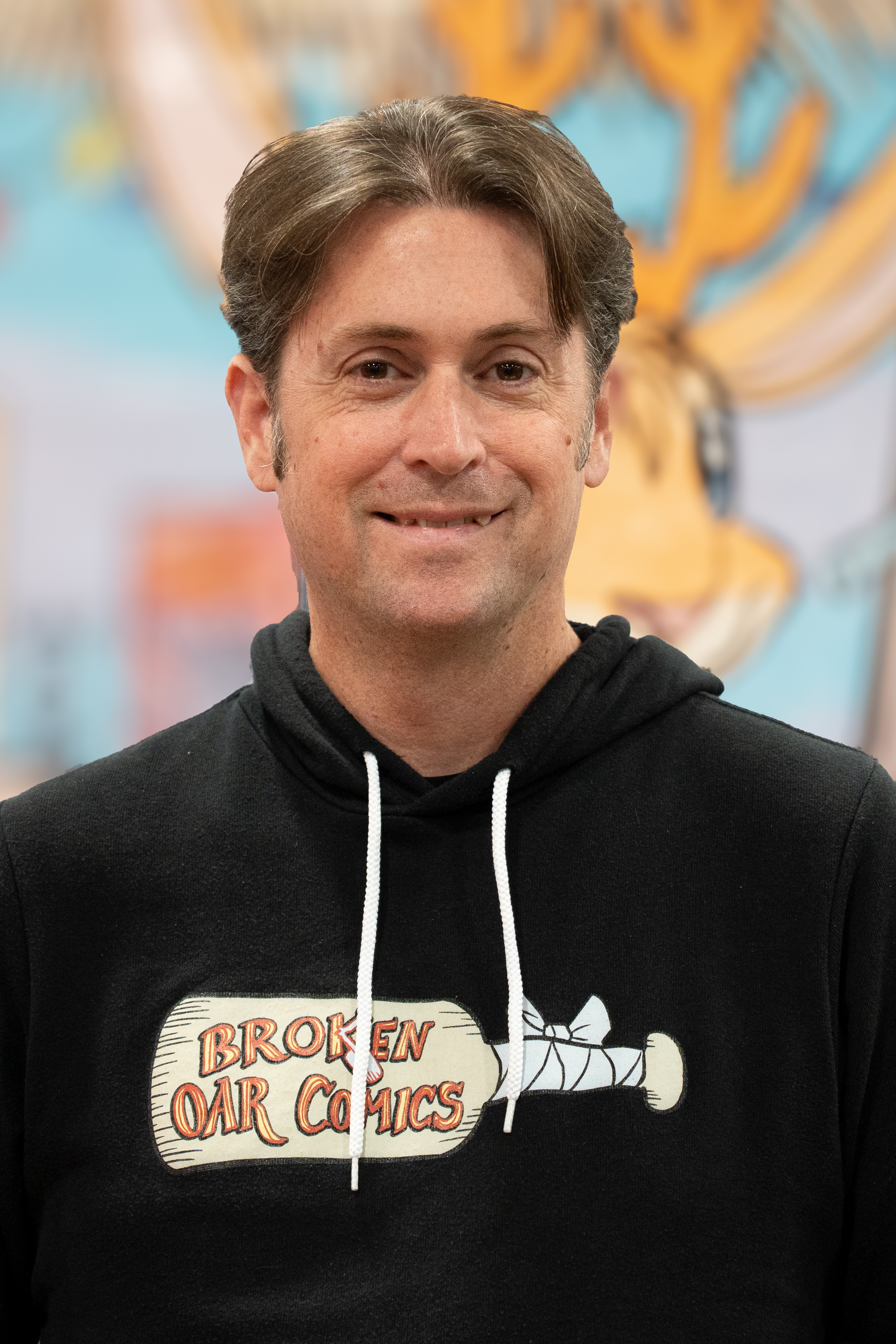
Nicholas Doan at Comic Con Oakland 2026

- Adventures of Maxy J Millionaire by Paul Maybury
- Araknid Kid by Josh Alves
- Avast Ye by Kevin Cygan and Daniel H. Irving
- Development Hell by Carlos Ruiz
- Frankie by Manny Trembley
- Ponbiki Z by Alberto Rios
- Pray for Death by Nicholas Doan and Daniele Serra (winner)
- The Crooked Man by Gabriel Hardman and Corinna Sara Bechko
- The Mundane Overrated Misadventures of Spudman by Rory McConville
- Word of Power by Marc Sylvanus

== 2008 competitions ==
=== January 2008 ===
As announced on Newsarama:

- A Spelunker's Guide to the City by Gary Epting
- Untrue Tales by Sam Little
- Urbis Faerie by Robert Burke Richardson, Martin Morazzo, Carolina Cesare, Robt Snyder
- Supertron by Sheldon Vella (winner)
- Thomas: Agent of Chaos by L. Jamal Walton (writer/letterer), Mike Imboden (writer) and Steve Musgrave (artist)
- Pieces of Eden by Seth Sherwood (writer/colorist) and Diego Tripodi (artist)
- The Legend of the Fool King by Alexander Kanaris-Sotiriou
- Demons in the Closet by John Zakour (writer) and Amy Watson (artist)
- Danetropolis by David Daneman
- Absurdity At Its Best by Victor Bonilla

=== February 2008 ===
As announced on Newsarama:

- Everyone Laughs at the Crocodile Man by Steve Steiner
- Joe Comics by Chachi & Gabe Hernandez
- Mountains of Dusk by Mani Magalhaes
- The Passenger by Alexandre Vidal
- Reno by Dan Thompson
- Road by Eddie Sharam (winner)
- Starfish by Miguel Angel Sanchez
- Strangle/Switch by Kevin Colden
- Teachers by Gabe Ostley
- Will Wrestle: For Science by Jim Dedieu, Geoff Beaulieu, & Alex Donnard

=== March 2008 ===
As announced on Newsarama:

- Among the Silver Stars by Chris Wichtendahl & Ariel Iacci
- The Black Cherry Bombshells by Johnny Zito, Tony Trov, Sacha Borisich & Alex Bruno (winner)
- Day of Prey by Ramon Cavalcante
- Laura’s Bazaar by Axel Medellin
- The Litterbox Chronicles by Wes Molebash
- Little Inventor by Igor Noronha
- Rojo Fernandez: Son of Wind by Gabriel Bautista
- Sam & Lilah by Jim Dougan & Hyeondo Park
- Tiempo by Mario Espinoza
- Yuletide by Tony Tobin

=== April 2008 ===
- Agent Happydeath by Spencer Platt
- Suckerpunch by Russel Paul Daff
- Feuerkind by Steven Michael Robert Wilbur
- Streetpunx by Leon Govender
- Punchboys by Ahmad Rashad Doucet
- Super Seed by Tyler James Vogel
- Melody by Ilias Kyriazis (winner)
- The Erebus Effect by Henry Espiritu, Ravuth Vann

=== May 2008 ===
- Action, Ohio by Neil Kleid
- E by Kerry P. Talbott
- Hannibal Goes to Rome by Brendan McGinley and Mauro Vargas
- Celadore by Canaan Grall (winner)
- Children of Bighand by Rudy Dean Guara
- Golden by Troy Bowen
- Colonel McTaggart by Steve Steiner
- The Mean Model by Charlie Podrebarac
- Robodeath by Azurek Studios

=== June 2008 ===
- Dual by Michael Walton (winner)
- Cursed Planet by R.G. Llarena
- Sam P.I. by John Zakour
- Mister Crimson by Seth M. Sherwood and Diego Tripodi
- Love, Lust, and a Giant Turtle by Neil Holan
- Psychopath: A Love Story by Matthew Petz
- Mime by Manny Trembly
- S. Type by Alexander Diochon
- Red Ice by Scott O. Brown
- Sharks+Shrinks by Gary Epting

=== July 2008: Zuda Invitational ===
- Joe Comics by Gabe Hernandez and Chachi Hernandez
- Dead in the Now by Corey Lewis
- The Mundane Overrated Misadventures of Spudman by Rory McConville
- Re-Evolution by Gustavo Higuera (winner)
- The Crooked Man by Gabriel Hardman and Corinna Sara Bechko
- Teachers by Gabriel Mark Ostley
- Araknid Kid by Josh Alves
- Brave Ulysses by Adam C. Moore
- Untrue Tales by Sam Little
- Reno by Daniel J. Thompson

=== August 2008 ===
- Gulch by Matt White and Gabe White (winner)
- Furiku Buredu by Jim Dedieu
- Vic Boone by Shawn Aldridge and Jeff Winstead
- The Harvest War by Kevin Manklow and Andrew Egan
- Junk by Justin Jordan and Sami Makkonen
- Shock Effect by John Lang and Ian Daffern
- To The Red Country by Philip Willey
- The Adventures of Rocki Gilbraltar by Brendon Fraim and Brian Fraim
- Rhandom Escape by Matthew Daniel Loux
- The Stuffed Animal Sagas by Tom Kelley

=== September 2008 ===
- Unconscious Life by Anthony Peruzzo
- Blood Hunter by Loren Meyer (winner)
- Problems by Alexander Diochon
- Middle-Aged Monster by Steve Steiner
- My Daddy's a Super-Villain by Scott O. Brown and Jamie Roberts
- Dash Steel: Freelance Adventurer by William Orr
- My Pet Human by Harry Pujols
- The Fighting Stranger by Adam J. Monetta
- Janggar: Son of the Steppe by Steve Bialik
- Hopeless Youth by Jesse Hanna

=== October 2008 ===
Guest judges: Bobby Timony and Peter Timony

- Mathema by Amy Pearson
- Hammer Sound by Evan Bryce and Doug Wagner
- Azure by Daniel Govar (winner)
- Alone by Daniel Furman
- Terrestrial by BW Swartz
- World of Chi: Chronicles by Lewis Walker
- Path Nine by Dan Pevar
- Azurius Pluma by Gabriel Bautista Jr.
- Skullgoyle by Dan Taylor
- Ladybug Murders by Paul Salvi

=== November 2008 ===
- Daily Comic by Chuck Harrison
- Extracurricular Activities by Rory McConville (winner)
- Screaming Eagles by Michael San Giacomo
- Baby Monsters by Steve Broom
- Blood Covenant: Revelations by Lucky Herman Tjandra
- Hijos de P by Amancay Nicolas Nahuelpan Bustamante
- Marshall by Andres Barrero and Felipe Martinez
- Planet X by Trey Causey
- Rumors of War by Justin Jordan and John Bivens
- Work is Not in Progress by Diego Borriello

=== December 2008 ===
- A Single Soul by Nancy Leslie and Daniel Furman
- Aeon of the Dead (now Devil's Wake) by Dean Hsieh (winner)
- Angus Frump Kills Christmas by Steve Bialik
- Bleed by Adam Atherton and Luiza Dragonescu
- Caztar by Luc Poets
- Hellbreak by Radek Smektala and Janusz Ordon
- Non-Exertus 12 by Spencer Platt
- Juliette: Worst Vampire Ever by Cedric Poulat
- The Accountants by Rob Osbourne
- Tri-Boro Tales by Keith Miller and Chuck Collins

== 2009 competitions ==
=== January 2009 ===
- Lasers Dragons and Lies by John Zakour and John Dallaire
- Legacy of the Wanderer by Mark Cecere and Randy Humphries
- Lifespan by Shannon Cronin and Christopher Steininger
- Love the Dango! by Amber D. Stone
- Maladroits by Glen Walker
- Project: WarHawk by Dan Thompson
- Safe Inside by Zerocalcare (winner)
- Sea Dogs of Mars by Christopher John Beck and Keri Woodward
- The Devil's Cross by Antonio Vazquez Galvez and Ana Belen Nuñez Villalta
- We Make Clouds by Michael Farah and J. Longo

=== February 2009 ===
- Azz's Inferno by Thane Benson
- Doctor Immortalis by Jason D and Michael Nelsen of 50 Foot Robot Studios
- Fire and Water by Federica Manfredi
- Gravedust by Jeff Mason
- Indie by Jericho Vilar
- Ninjas from Ibiza: Clubbin' to Death by Francesco Biagini
- Operation: Nazi U by Kevin Dzuban
- Part-Time Magic by Greg Kinman
- Splitting Atoms by Siddharth Kotian
- The Hammer by Sam Little, Gabe Ostley, Rob Berry, and Steve Steiner (winner)

=== March 2009 ===
- Children of Armageddon by Chris Meeks
- Deadly by James Fosdike (winner)
- Doorman Bill by Diego Flavio Tripodi
- Dracula vs. Santa by Melissa DeJesus and Ed Power
- Kharon: Scourge of Atlantis by Jim Shelley and Pierre Villeneuve
- Lani, The Leopard Queen by Geof Isherwood
- Maintaining Bohemia by Buster Moody and Harold Sipe
- Panda Force by Sean Causley
- The Dirty Mile by James Smith III
- The Rejects by Nate Frisoli and Walter Ostlie

=== April 2009 ===
- Cancer Troop 4 by Gabriel Bautista
- Earthbuilders by Axel Medellin Machain (winner)
- Intergalactic Law: Grey Squad by Lisa Fary & John Dallaire
- Mecha-Simian by Rich Lovatt
- Myth by Michael Loniewski
- Pirate Eye by Robert Gervais
- Spy6teen by Tim Simmons
- The Kind You Don't Bring Home to Mother by Ryan Estrada
- The Rise and Fall of the Penguin by Harry Pujols

=== May 2009 ===
- Amber Hale, Supermodel by Daren Strange, Lewis Walker & Josh Howard
- Beertown B'hoys by Steve Bialik
- Clandestino by Amancay Nicolas Nahuelpan Bustamante
- Cubicles by Walter Christopher Ostlie
- Flowing Wells by Andrew Dimitt
- Freak City by Mackenzie Michael Schubert
- Gone Zombie by Stephen Thor
- Lily of the Valley by Adam Atherton & Luiza Dragonescu (winner)
- OPSEC by James Alexander Bott & Dean
- Sides by Alexander Diochon

=== June 2009 ===
- Fallen Hunter by Wai Kwong Chan
- Kogoshii by Danny Donovan and Gigi
- Quick by Thane Frederick Benson
- Scarecrow Spookshow by Aidan Casserly
- Sidewise by Dwight L. MacPherson and Igor Noronha (winner)
- Sketch Me, Deadly by David Gerard Miley
- Small Lives by Marco Palombelli
- The Corpse Carries A Gun by Matthew Petz
- The Last Werewolf by SEDNA-STUDIO
- The Urban Adventures of Melvin Blank by Bill Williams and Thom Zahler

=== July 2009 ===
- 9th Year by Alberto Lanzillotti & Manuel Bracchi
- Assignment by Anthony Peruzzo & Justin Jordan
- Bloody Pulp by Jeff McComsey & Jorge Vega
- Children's Games by Erik Valdez y Alanis
- Interrogation Control Element by Tyler James, Damian Couceiro, Paul John Little & Steve D Forbes
- Metropolitan Siege by Eric & Chris Zawadzki
- RockStar by Aluísio Cervelle Santos (winner)
- The Adventures of Mr. Simian by John Bivens
- The Ares Imperative by Steve Ekstrom, Mikael Bergkvist & Jesse Turnbull
- Vigilante Granny by Don Kunkel, Rian Miller & CPWilsonIII

=== August 2009 ===
- A Stinking Corpse by Daniel Furman
- Absolute Magnitude by Robert Burke Richardson, Martin Morazzo & chinadoll (winner)
- Antique Books by Scott Boyce
- Arctic by 00ghost00
- Bow & Arrow Detective Agency by George Gousis & Antonis Vavagiannis
- Cards Kill by Jason Chiu & Leah Liu Robekka Art Studio
- If You See The Hills by Sal Field
- Octane Jungle by Morgan Luthi & Mike L. Kinshella
- Physikon by Alexander Drummond Diochon
- Rogue Royal by Chris Garret

=== September 2009 ===
- Goldilock by Adam Lucas (winner)
- Zamir by Pablo Zych
- WheelJack Union by Mike Odum
- The Symptoms by William Sliney & Dave Hendrick
- Marked by Fernando Pinto
- Revenge of the Homicidal Pumpkins by Shannon Cronin, Iwan Nazif & Lisa Moore
- Incarna by David Gunawan
- Tessyleia 2.0 by Marc Borstel
- Mystery Jungle by Diego Cordoba
- My T-Shirt Fairy Tale by Adrian Ramos

=== October 2009 ===
- Pluck by Gabe White, John Amor & Matt White (winner)
- Where Evils Dare by Tony Lee & Stefano Martino
- Doc Monster by David Flora
- Evil Ain't Easy by Seth Wolfshorndl
- Impure Blood by Nathan Lueth & Nadja Baer
- ShockPopTerror! by Jean-Michel Ringuet
- A Polar Nightmare by Amancay Nicolas Nahuelpan Bustamante
- Old Cthulhu's On The Rise by Daniel Tollin
- Fly Me From The Moon by Gabriel Bautista
- Blitz by Ted Dawson

=== November 2009 ===
- In Maps & Legends by Niki Smith and Michael Jasper (winner)
- Children of the Sewer by Benito Gallego
- Peabody & D'Gorath by Mark D. Penman
- Model Student by Joe Bowen
- Little Earth People by Christopher Lewis and Joe Pekar
- Brother of Bronze Hammer by Andrew Alexander
- Slam McCracken by Greg Woronchak
- Big Ups: A Space Adventure by Christina Boyce and Justin King
- Molly and the Amazing Door Tree by Mark Murphy
- Witch Phase by Bryan Golden

=== December 2009 ===
- One Hit Knock Out by Maximo V. Lorenzo (winner)
- Villain by Gregory Smallwood
- Unseen Tribe by Luciano Vecchio
- The House Always Wins by Josh Hechinger and John Bivens
- SubSuelo by Alfredo Rodríguez and Gabriel Rodríguez
- Ayanna by Wai Kwong Chan
- Mark Wolfchild by Li Shi Peng and David LeVack
- Daemon's Sphere by Andrew Hartmann and Gill Saxon
- Goop Jr. by Mike Robinson
- Jason and the Argonauts Redux by Barry Keegan

== 2010 competitions ==
=== January 2010 ===
- Beyond The Borderlands by Brian McLachlan
- Candy From Strangers by Jim Rodgers and Byron Jackson
- Iron Sam by David Dumeer
- NewBot by Chuck Harrison
- Pavlov's Dream by Shari Chankhamma and Bicyclefish
- Phantom Sword by Nick Edwards
- Road Monster by Nicolás Raúl Sánchez Brondo and Diego Cortés
- The Thunderchickens by William Dean Blankenship Jr. and Chad Boudreau
- War Of The Fallen by Quinton J. Bedwell
- War Of The Woods by Matthew Petz
