= South Fellini =

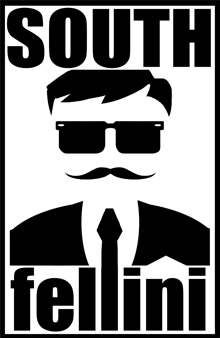
- Genre: Science, fiction, Horror, Pop-Culture
- Founded: 2005
- Founder: Tony Trov & Johnny Zito
- Headquarters: Philadelphia PA, USA
- Website: SouthFellini.com

South Fellini is an American media and apparel studio established by Tony Trov and Johnny Zito in 2005.

== History ==
=== Founding ===
Trov and Zito began to collaborate while attending Temple University. South Fellini became the umbrella name for all creative projects made by the duo since 2005.

=== Comic books ===
In 2008, South Fellini won a comic book competition with their Girl Gang VS Zombie series Black Cherry Bombshells at Zuda Comics, a digital imprint of DC Comics. Zuda Comics also purchased their second series about South Philadelphia vampires titled LaMorte Sisters. Continuing their time in the comic book industry, a self published book titled Carnivale Robotique was released for Indie Skip Week. Their series Moon Girl was the first series published by Comixology and was printed to a graphic novel by Red 5 Comics.

=== Films ===
Following their time in the comic book industry, the duo wrote and directed two feature-length horror comedies that were distributed by Gravitas Ventures. In 2013 Alpha Girls: A Satanic Sorority Slasher was released. Following the success of the film, American Exorcist was released in 2018.

=== Lifestyle brand ===
South Fellini opened their first brick and mortar shop on East Passyunk Avenue, South Philadelphia, in 2016. In 2019 South Fellini grabbed headlines for dressing Bryce Harper of the Philadelphia Phillies on his first home game in Philadelphia. Later that year, South Fellini was in the news again for opening a second location in Fashion District Philadelphia that featured the mannequin prop from the 1987 film Mannequin. In 2021 a Free Blockbuster was launched at the Passyunk Avenue shop location along with a Free Comic Library in 2025.

=== Return to arts and media ===
During COVID-19 lockdown, South Fellini returned to producing media content, starting with podcast dedicated to Philadelphia history, titled Legends of Philadelphia.

In 2022, they began releasing an ongoing project of short animated cartoons titled Wild Jawns on Instagram and YouTube. The cartoon was inspired by their art installation collaboration with street artist Kid Hazo.

In 2023, they began releasing a monthly multimedia hauntology project called Hoagiewave, which featured lost Philadelphia media with original music by Trov. The music was released as an album on Spotify, Apple Music, and cassette.

== Comics ==
DC Entertainment:

- Black Cherry Bombshells (2008–2011)
- La Morté Sisters (2009–2011)

Comixology

- Carnivale De Robotique (2010)

Red 5 Comics

- Moon Girl (2011–2013)

Image Comics

- D.O.G.S. of Mars (2012)

== Films ==
- Fiesta Day – Ford Fiesta short film series
- Alpha Girls – 2013
- American Exorcist – 2018
- Hoagiewave – 2024

== Awards ==
- "Outstanding Achievement in Local Comic Art" – 2011 Philadelphia Geek Awards
- "Feature Length Indie Film of the Year" – 2012 Philadelphia Geek Awards nomination
- "Makers of the Year" – 2016 Philadelphia Geek Awards
- "Best of Philly" – 2018 Philadelphia Magazine
