= Domo TV =

- Series intertitle
- Genre: Children's animation Stop motion
- Based on: Domo by Tsuneo Gōda
- Directed by: Tsuneo Gōda
- Countries of origin: United States; Japan
- Original languages: English; Japanese (Note: The show itself contains no spoken dialogue, but there are localised title cards for each episode and the theme song is recorded in two language versions: Japanese for Japan, and English for most other markets.)
- No. of seasons: 1
- No. of episodes: 26

Production
- Executive producer: Nina Hahn
- Producers: Jules Borkent; Debbie MacDonald; Noriko Matsumoto; Adina Pitt
- Cinematography: Kan Sugiki
- Running time: 2 minutes
- Production companies: Nickelodeon Productions; NHK Enterprises; Dwarf; TYO Inc. Media International Corporation; Big Tent Entertainment

Original release
- Network: Nicktoons (U.S.); NHK General TV, BS Hi (Japan); Nickelodeon (international)
- Release: October 27, 2008 – February 2009

Domo TV is a stop-motion animated children's short television series produced by NHK Enterprises and Nickelodeon's Nicktoons network. The series consists of 26 two-minute episodes that were aired on Nicktoons in the United States and on Nickelodeon networks internationally. It was the Nickelodeon brand's first anime project and the second series after Kappa Mikey to be branded as a Nicktoons Network original program.

== Source material ==
The series is based on Domo, a Japanese mascot character who had previously appeared in many interstitial sketches for television channels owned by NHK.

== Premise ==
The series follows Domo and his friends—Mr. Usaji the rabbit, Tashanna the weasel, and two bats named Maya and Mario—on simple adventures devoid of dialogue. Each episode is about two minutes long and is entirely animated in stop motion. Nickelodeon made creative changes to the existing world of Domo for Domo TV, such as new locations and an updated rock-inspired theme song.

== Production ==
Advertised as a "venture into anime production" for Nickelodeon, Domo TV was first announced at the 2006 Tokyo International Anime Fair and began airing in 2008. A new short was aired every week in the United States for six months. After this time period, production of new episodes stopped. The final shorts aired in early 2009, followed by a series of advertisements for 7-Eleven featuring Domo that were also broadcast on Nickelodeon. The entire series was released on DVD later that year.

== Characters ==
- Domo is a brown monster with an ambiguous expression who enjoys watching television and listening to rock music. He hatched from an egg and lives in a cave.
- Mr. Usaji is a wise rabbit with gray fur who lives with Domo and wears eyeglasses. He normally tries to provide Domo with advice.
- Tashanna is a yellow weasel who is an aspiring fashion model. She is obsessed with modern technology.
- Maya and Mario are two bats (a mother and a son, respectively) who live on the ceiling of Domo's cave.

== Production ==
The series is based upon NHK's official mascot Domo, who serves as the main character. Production on Domo TV commenced in spring 2006 as part of Nickelodeon's "first venture into anime production." The trade magazine ICv2 noted in 2006 that the success of anime-inspired series on Nickelodeon—particularly Avatar: The Last Airbender—likely influenced the network's decision to develop a true anime. At the time, Nickelodeon and Viacom's then-Senior Vice President Steve Grieder was planning to establish Viacom International as a global platform for international animation, including Japanese works. The program was initially announced by Grieder at the 2006 Tokyo International Anime Fair as a way to "create Domo for U.S. audiences." Television director Tsuneo Gōda created the show.

The characters in Domo TV are animated in stop motion with some computer-generated imagery. The Tokyo-based animation studio Dwarf Incorporated built and animated the props used for each character.

== Merchandise ==
Play Along Toys distributed a line of plush toys, action figures, and playsets to coincide with the U.S. debut of Domo TV. Domo was also used in Target Halloween promotions during the show's run. On July 1, 2009, it was confirmed by TYO Animations that all 26 episodes would be released on DVD. They were made available as part of a three-disc box set that also included every Domo television spot that had been produced to that date.

== Release ==
In August 2007, it was announced that Domo TV would premiere on Nickelodeon in the United States in autumn of that year. The American release was pushed back multiple times, with Viacom Media Networks postponing the premiere to 2008. The first channels to launch Domo TV were Nickelodeon's international networks in Europe, Latin America, Australia, and New Zealand. Beginning in October 2008, the program was aired on Nicktoons in the United States. A new short was aired every week for six months. The New York-based company Big Tent Entertainment, which had previously collaborated with Nickelodeon on Miffy and Friends, handled marketing Domo TV outside of Asia. After the series finished airing, Domo programs (including the television spots that the title character originated in) had been shown in over 170 regions. The series itself had been translated into 17 different languages for various Nick outlets.

Nickelodeon also broadcast a three-part commercial advertising Domo TV products at 7-Eleven in October 2009.

=== International broadcast ===
Country/Region	Channel
United States	Nicktoons Network
Canada	Nickelodeon
United Kingdom	Nicktoons Network
Japan	NHK
Argentina; Brazil; Chile; Colombia; Mexico; Peru	Nickelodeon
Australia	Nickelodeon
Egypt; Iraq; Kuwait; Saudi Arabia; Syria; United Arab Emirates	Nickelodeon
New Zealand	Nickelodeon
Philippines	ABS-CBN

== Reception ==
Rob Walker of The New York Times deemed the show "cute" and "kid-friendly," but also felt that it was created solely for Domo's "crossover into licensed merchandise." Adweek reported in 2009 that the Domo character "is best known [in the U.S.] for his video shorts on Nickelodeon." The Star Tribune's Tom Horgen stated that the Nickelodeon deal contributed to Domo's mainstream success as a mascot. The July 2015 issue of Time Out listed "the internet and Nickelodeon" as the outlets that led to Domo's international recognition.
