= Tony Trov =

American filmmaker (born 1983)

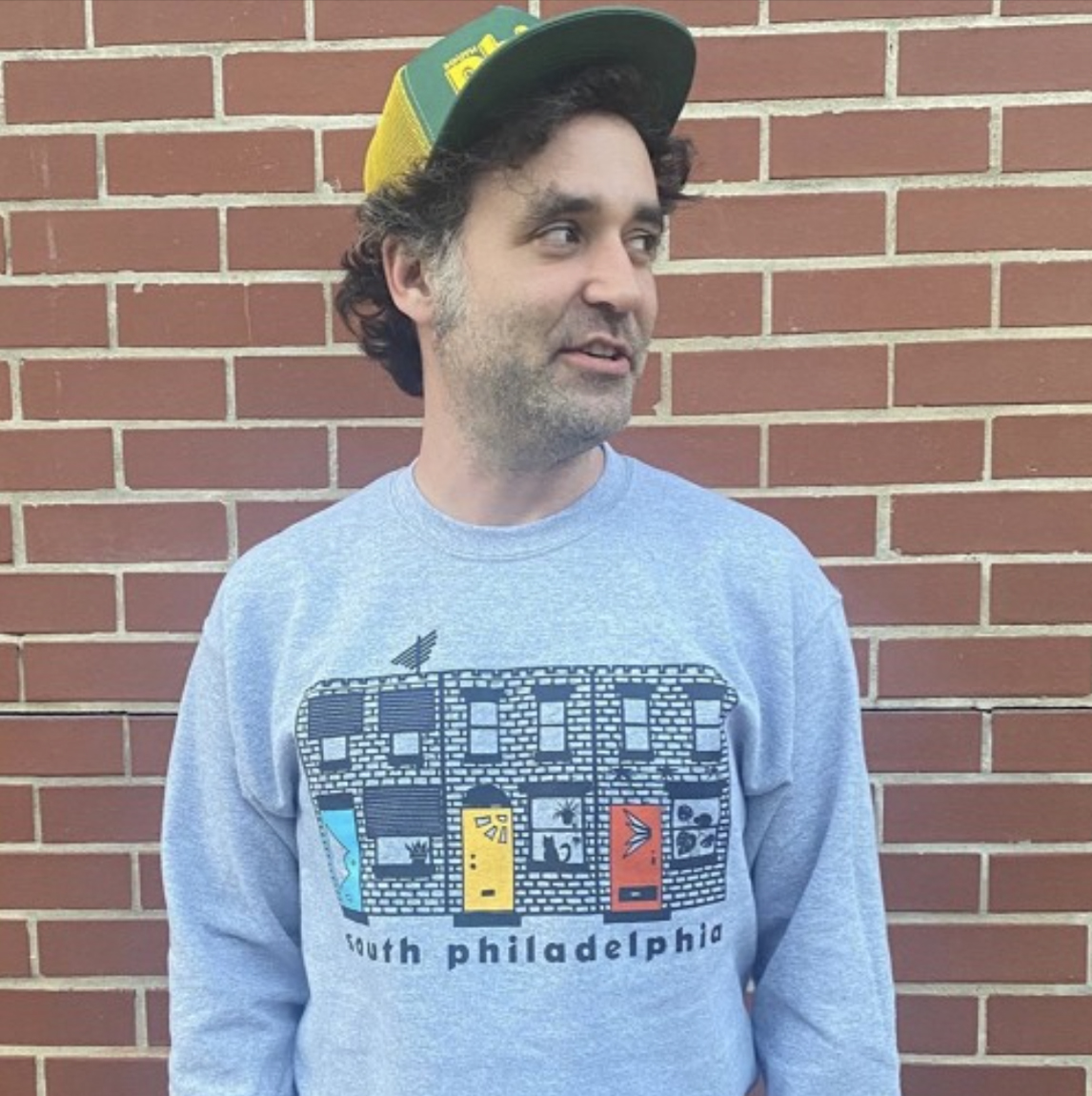
- Trov in Philadelphia, Pennsylvania
- Awards: Philadelphia Geek Award

Tony Trov (born Anthony Trovarello, 1983) is an American filmmaker, comic book creator and musician best known as a co-creator of Philadelphia studio South Fellini.

== Early life ==
Trov is a native of Philadelphia, Pennsylvania and graduated from Girard Academic Music Program in 2001. Afterwards, he attended Temple University, obtaining a degree in mass media.

== Career ==
Trov's career started with film and television productions in the art department. Most notably TLC's Trading Spaces and several Bollywood films.

In 2008, along with co-writer Johnny Zito, he won the March Zuda Comics competition with The Black Cherry Bombshells. The duo's sophomore effort, La Morté Sisters, was also purchased by Zuda Comics in 2009. Both comics were nominated for Harvey Awards in the Best Online Comic Category; 2009 and 2011 respectively.

When Zuda Comics dissolved in 2010, The Black Cherry Bombshells and La Morté Sisters were migrated to the DC Online imprint along with several other popular titles.

In 2009 Trov and Zito teamed with Comixology to digitally distribute a mini-series based on their self-published comic Carnivale De Robotique. Trov and Zito's digital comic based on the public domain character Moon Girl was digitally distributed through Comixology before being printed by Red5 Comics in spring of 2011.

In 2010 they began digitally distributing the space-horror comic D.O.G.S. of Mars through Comixology, followed by a print edition by Image Comics. The comic has also been optioned as a film by High Treason Pictures.

Their production company, South Fellini, released their first feature film, Alpha Girls in 2013 through Gravitas Ventures. In 2015, production began on a second feature film, American Exorcist.

Trov also has performed with different music acts on bass guitar. He is a founder and songwriter of Fat City Reprise and performed with The Swimmers in 2008. In 2011, he began performing with psychedelic band Southwork on tenor saxophone.

== Tofani door preservation ==
Trov has been a leading advocate for the preservation of the Tofani door, decorative mid-century entryways found primarily on South Philadelphia rowhomes. Recognizing their cultural and architectural value, Trov began collecting original Tofani doors, salvaging them from demolition sites and discarded renovation projects. Through his South Fellini brand, he has promoted their legacy in visual art, podcasts, apparel, and public installations. In 2024, he donated a preserved door to the Atwater Kent Collection, helping to enshrine its significance in Philadelphia's design history.

== Films ==
- Alpha Girls – 2013
- American Exorcist – 2018

== Comics ==
DC Entertainment:

- The Black Cherry Bombshells (2008- 2011)
- La Morté Sisters (2009- 2011)

Comixology

- Carnivale De Robotique (2010)

Red 5 Comics

- Moon Girl (2011- 2013)

Image Comics

- D.O.G.S. of Mars (2012)

== Music ==
- Live at Grape Street Pub - 2004 - Fat City Reprise - Bass
- Arise - 2012 Southwork - Tenor Saxophone
- Seasons Passing EP - 2013 Southwork - Tenor Saxophone
- Wear Your Heart Out - 2014 Southwork - Tenor Saxophone
- South Fellini Presents: HOAGIEWAVE - 2023 Tony Trov - Written, Performed and Produced
- "If You Give Me Seven Fishes” - 2023, Tony Trov and Johnny Zito
- South Fellini Presents: Orpheus and The Divine Lorraine Cosmic Peril - 2024, Joanna and Tony Trov
- South Fellini Presents: Scrapple Confidential - 2026, Tony Trov
