= Alpha Girls =

Alpha Girls: A Satanic Sorority Slasher
- Directed by: Tony Trov and Johnny Zito
- Produced by: South Fellini
- Starring: Nikki Bell; Falon Joslyn; Beverly Rivera; Nicole Cinaglia; Kara Zhang; Norm Schultz
- Cinematography: Rory Hanrahan
- Edited by: Andrew Geller
- Music by: Southwork
- Distributed by: Gravitas Ventures
- Release date: September 1, 2013
- Running time: 86 minutes
- Country: United States

Alpha Girls is a 2013 comedy horror film directed by Tony Trov and Johnny Zito and starring Falon Joslyn, Nikki Bell and featuring Ron Jeremy and Schoolly D.

== Premise ==
Hoping to make a fresh start, Morgan (Falon Joslyn) comes to a new school and the sorority she's heard about all of her life, Alpha Beta. While her initial greetings from Sorority President Veronica (Nikki Bell) are less than warm, Morgan finds her place in the new pledge class and a kindred spirit in Cassidy (Beverly Rivera). However the rushes learn that Alpha Beta isn't as squeaky clean as they think and Alpha House is tainted by a malevolence from another world. Morgan must find a way to save herself and her friends from the oncoming darkness.

== Production ==
Production took place on location during the hottest summer ever recorded in Philadelphia, Pennsylvania.

== Reception ==
HorrorNews.net and Ain't It Cool News both reviewed the film favorably, the former stating that "The film could have quickly taken the exploitation route and for a moment I thought it would, instead it surprised me by being smart, quick witted, and a completely entertaining horror comedy."

Alpha Girls won the "Feature Length Indie Film of the Year" category of the 2012 Philadelphia Geek Awards
