= American Exorcist =

- Directed by: Tony Trov; Johnny Zito
- Starring: Bill Moseley; Falon Joslyn
- Cinematography: Matt Joffe
- Music by: Mike Vivas
- Production company: South Fellini
- Distributed by: Gravitas Ventures
- Release date: October 26, 2018
- Running time: 90 minutes
- Country: United States
- Language: English

American Exorcist is a 2018 American independent horror film directed by Tony Trov and Johnny Zito and starring Bill Moseley and Falon Joslyn. It was released in October 2018.

== Plot summary ==
American Exorcist is about a paranormal investigator, trapped in a haunted high rise on Christmas Eve. She is horrified once confronted with the reality of the supernatural and risks life and limb to escape the stranded 11th floor.

== Cast ==
- Bill Moseley as Mr. Snowfeather
- Falon Joslyn as Georgette DuBois
- Jeff Orens as Budd Elwood
- Alison Crozier as René DuBois
- John McKeever as Frederic

== Production ==
Production took place in an abandoned government building in Philadelphia, Pennsylvania, in the winter of 2015. Influenced by Italian horror, the crew experimented with many practical special effects.
