= The Night Owls (webcomic) =

Webcomic

- Author(s): Peter and Bobby Timony
- Website: http://www.zudacomics.com/the_night_owls/
- Current status/schedule: Twice weekly, every Tuesday and Thursday
- Launch date: 2007-12-13
- Publisher: Zuda Comics
- Genre(s): Historical, comedy, horror
- Rating: Suitable for young children

The Night Owls is an American supernatural comedy webcomic created by brothers Peter and Bobby Timony. Written by Peter Timony and illustrated by Bobby Timony, the series was originally published by Zuda Comics, the digital-comics imprint of DC Comics, from December 2007 through December 2009. It was selected as Zuda's second "Instant Winner", receiving a publishing contract without participating in the imprint's monthly reader-voting competition.

Set in New York City during the 1920s, the series follows a group of detectives investigating supernatural crimes. Combining elements of occult detective fiction, horror, fantasy, and comedy, the webcomic alternates between standalone humorous episodes and longer serialized adventures.

The series was collected in a 192-page graphic novel, The Night Owls, Volume 1, published by DC Comics on March 24, 2010.

== Publication history ==
The Night Owls was created by twin brothers Peter and Bobby Timony, with Peter serving as writer and Bobby providing the artwork. The series was selected by Zuda Comics as an "Instant Winner" in December 2007, following Jeremy Love's Bayou, the imprint's first such selection.

Unlike Zuda's monthly competition winners, Instant Winners were selected directly by the imprint's editorial staff and awarded publishing contracts without participating in a public vote.

The webcomic debuted in December 2007 and was published twice weekly, with new installments appearing on Tuesdays and Thursdays. Its original serialization concluded in December 2009.

In March 2010, DC Comics published The Night Owls, Volume 1, collecting the webcomic's original installments. The 192-page collection featured writing by Peter Timony and artwork by Bobby Timony.

== Premise and format ==
Set in 1920s New York City, The Night Owls follows three investigators specializing in supernatural mysteries: Professor Ernest Baxter, an expert in the occult; Mindy Markus, an adventurous young flapper; and Roscoe, a wisecracking gargoyle.

The characters investigate crimes and unusual occurrences involving ghosts, vampires, monsters, and figures drawn from folklore. The stories combine supernatural mysteries with the humor and visual conventions of early twentieth-century adventure serials.

The series alternates between self-contained comic strips and extended storylines, with recurring characters and developing relationships connecting individual adventures.

Its visual presentation draws on early newspaper comic strips, particularly their horizontal panel arrangements and decorative banners. Much of the artwork uses warm sepia coloring to evoke its historical setting, with occasional departures into full color.

== Reception ==
The Night Owls received positive reviews for its combination of supernatural mystery, comedy, historical atmosphere, and visual storytelling. Critics particularly praised the Timony brothers' character development, use of serialized and standalone narratives, and adaptation of traditional newspaper comic-strip conventions to digital publishing.

In an October 2008 review, comics critic Sean Kleefeld described The Night Owls as one of the strongest publications to emerge from Zuda Comics. Kleefeld praised Peter Timony's accessible storytelling, the integration of continuing subplots with self-contained episodes, and Bobby Timony's consistent character designs and period-appropriate artwork. He particularly commended the series' use of Zuda's horizontal digital format, arguing that its readable lettering, pacing, and page composition demonstrated an understanding of the differences between digital comics and conventional print publications. Kleefeld considered it one of the best comics produced through the Zuda initiative.

Following the publication of The Night Owls, Volume 1 in 2010, Johanna Draper Carlson of Comics Worth Reading praised the series' imaginative treatment of supernatural detective fiction and its combination of short humorous episodes with developing storylines. Carlson highlighted Mindy Markus as a particularly engaging character and commended Bobby Timony's confident linework, expressive character designs, and use of sepia coloring to evoke the 1920s. Although she observed that some panels lacked detailed backgrounds, she considered the artwork effective and praised the collected edition for allowing the longer narrative to develop without interruptions between installments.

Reviewing the graphic novel for Under the Radar in April 2010, Jeremy Nisen gave it a score of 7 out of 10. Nisen praised the Timony brothers' humor, character interactions, and gradual introduction of a larger narrative connecting the initially episodic stories. He singled out Roscoe the Gargoyle's comic role and the developing mystery surrounding Professor Ernest Baxter. Nisen criticized the collected edition's cover design and considered some of its humor excessive, but concluded that the series was an entertaining work whose development had benefited from DC's Zuda publishing initiative.

In July 2010, Comicsgirl praised the series' playful combination of horror, fantasy, romance, crime fiction, and slapstick comedy. The review highlighted the contrast between Peter Timony's lighthearted writing and Bobby Timony's retro-inspired artwork, noting that the characters' distinct personalities and the sepia-toned presentation contributed to the comic's period atmosphere. The reviewer particularly praised the series' unpredictability and willingness to explore different storytelling genres.

In an August 2012 retrospective on digital-first comics, Matt White of Publishers Weekly identified The Night Owls alongside High Moon and Bayou as three of Zuda's most popular titles to receive subsequent print publication. The article examined Zuda's role as an early experiment in digital-first comics publishing and its contribution to DC Comics' later digital distribution initiatives.

== Characters ==
- Professor Ernest Baxter is a bookwormish and kind of shy fellow who uses his vast knowledge of the supernatural world to try to help people.
- Mindy Markus is a feisty flapper with a modern "liberated" outlook on life who is not afraid to get into a scrap with the forces of evil.
- Roscoe the Gargoyle is a gargoyle from Coney Island with an insatiable appetite; he provides additional comic relief with his flippant and lighthearted approach to things.
- Detective Bill McRory is an honest cop who occasionally seeks help from the Night Owls on cases involving the supernatural.
- Mr. You is a faceless man who steals the faces of others.
- Mable the Gargoyle is Roscoe's sister who, when first introduced, looks inexplicably like a gorgeous blonde human.
- Filthy the Rat is The Professor's underworld informant. Filthy is a rat who is a "Were-Human": by the light of the full moon, he turns into a tiny human.
- Helaku is an Apache girl who met Professor Baxter when he was younger. Baxter helped the tribe defeat a giant monster named Big Owl.
- Ikshu is Helaku's older brother. He went to prison for bootlegging where he met Mr. You, who stole his face and escaped.

== Print ==
Bayou and High Moon were the first two Zuda titles to be published as graphic novels, in June and October 2009, respectively by DC Comics. "Night Owls" was the third title to be released from the imprint and was released on March 30, 2010.

== Awards and nominations ==
The Night Owls received three Harvey Award nominations in 2009, including Best New Series, Best Online Comics Work, and Best New Talent for Bobby Timony. The series also received recognition from the Lulu Awards and Cybils Awards.

Year	Award	Category	Work or recipient	Result
2009	Harvey Award	Best New Series	The Night Owls — Peter and Bobby Timony	Nominated
2009	Harvey Award	Best Online Comics Work	The Night Owls — Peter and Bobby Timony	Nominated
2009	Harvey Award	Best New Talent	Bobby Timony — The Night Owls	Nominated
2010	Lulu Award	Best Female Character	Mindy Markus — The Night Owls	Nominated
2010	Cybils Award	Graphic Novels — Young Adult	The Night Owls, Volume 1 — Peter and Bobby Timony	Finalist
