= Maximo V. Lorenzo =

American cartoonist

- Born: Maximo Vitaly Lorenzo; June 4, 1982 (age 44) Maracaibo, Venezuela
- Areas: Cartoonist, Writer, Penciller, Artist, Inker, Colourist

Maximo Vitaly Lorenzo (born June 4, 1982 in Maracaibo, Venezuela), is an American artist for comic books and illustrations.

== Biography ==
Lorenzo started his comic book career in 2004, winning a placement for writing and illustrating "Hellbender" for Tokyopop's Rising Stars of Manga Issue 4 competition. Immediately after he attended the "Joe Kubert School" of comic books and cartooning for two years. In 2006 he received freelance work to illustrate Tokyopop's property Bombos Versus Everything a 182-page graphic novel of the shonen genre, originally written by Andy Helms. Between 2006-2007, while working on Bombos VS. Everything, he worked as a caricature and portrait artist for Kaman's Art Shoppes. In the summer of 2008 Maximo V. Lorenzo completed art and writing for an 8-page story "Avocado Allegrando" to be included in Popgun 3 a comics anthology by Image Comics. In the fall of 2008 he was hired to work on Ghostbusters: Ghost Busted a Ghostbusters comic anthology. Maximo V. Lorenzo's contributions were, art for "Theater of Pain" written by Matt Yamashita, Ink and tone work for "Worm in the apple" and "Ghost Busted" story by Nathan Johnson, art by Micheal Shelfer. During Domo Kun's special 7-11 campaign, Maximo was featured in a short 7-11 version of the Domo Kun comic in October 2009. At the end of 2009 he competed in and won DC Comics's Zuda Comics competition with his entry "One Hit Knock Out".

== Bibliography ==
=== Tokyopop ===
- RSOM4: "Hellbender" (2004, tpb, ISBN 1-59182-538-5)
- Bombos VS. Everything (with Andy Helms, August 2007, ISBN 978-1-59816-698-9)
- Ghostbusters: Ghostbusted (2008)
- Domokun (2009)

=== Image Comics ===
- Popgun Volume 3: "Avocado Allegrando" (2009, ISBN 1-58240-974-9) (Eisner Award Winning)
- Popgun Volume 4: "Avocado Allegrando" (2010)

=== DC Comics ===
- "ONE HIT KNOCK OUT" (Zuda Comics, 2009)

=== UDON ===
- "MEGAMAN TRIBUTE" (UDON, 2011), ISBN 1926778308

=== WEBCOMICS ===
- "ONE HIT KNOCK OUT" (Webcomic, 2012)
