= Domo (NHK) =

Mascot of Japanese NHK TV network

- First appearance: December 22, 1998
- Created by: Tsuneo Gōda
- Voiced by: Shizuo Yamakawa; Tesshō Genda

In-universe information
- Species: Monster
- Gender: Male

Domo (どーも くん, Dōmo-kun) is the official mascot of Japanese public broadcaster NHK, appearing in several 30-second stop-motion interstitial sketches, which are shown as station identification in between the channel's programming. The character is a furry monster that is boxy and brown and often has his big mouth wide open.

== Origin ==
Domo-kun first appeared in short stop-motion sketches on December 22, 1998, to mark the 10th anniversary of NHK's satellite broadcasting. The name "Domo" was acquired during the second episode of his show, in which NHK then-newsreader Shizuo Yamakawa said "dōmo, konnichiwa" (どーも、こんにちは), which is a greeting that can be translated as "Well, hello there!", but which can also be interpreted as "Hello, Domo", and thus is a convenient pun (dajare). The kun suffix on "Domo-kun", the name used to describe the character in the Japanese versions, is a Japanese honorific often used with young males.

== Development ==
Tsuneo Gōda, a stop motion animator and character designer, created Domo for NHK in 1998 and directed a stop motion animated TV series based on the character in 2008. Gōda says that by using stop motion one can "create a work filled with feeling".

== Characters ==
Domo, the main character, is a brown, furry monster with a large, sawtoothed mouth that is locked wide open. His favorite food is nikujaga, a Japanese meat and potato stew. According to a Tokyopop press release of the Domo comic book, Domo "communicates sotto voce with a verve that only his friends can understand." Domo can only say his name. Clint Bickham, the writer of the Domo comic book, said that to him Domo's expression is "a sort of cheery wonderment. Like when a kid wakes to a room full of presents on Christmas day." While Domo's face has variants, to Bickham most of his expressions have "an underlying sense of fascination." Domo is known to pass gas repeatedly and sweat when nervous or upset. Variants of Domo-kun in different styles and outfits have been introduced by NHK, including One Domo-kun, a fluffy white and gray variant of Domo-kun with floppy ears, released in 2025 to celebrate the release of NHK One.

Domo lives in a cave with Mr. Usaji, known in Japanese-language versions as Usajii (うさじい), a portmanteau of the words usagi (うさぎ), (rabbit), and ojii-san (お爺さん), old man or grandpa. Mr. Usaji is a wise old rabbit who has lived in a cave for decades, loves to watch television and drink astringent green tea. Mr. Usaji is not into any "new" materials, and does not own a telephone. In terms of fashion, Mr. Usaji focuses on materials instead of shapes. Mr. Usaji's favorite food is carrots, and his least favorite food is "something that is meaningless."

Also in the cave live two bats, a mother named Maya (Shinobu (しのぶ) in the Japanese version) and her child Mario (Morio (もりお) in the Japanese version). Maya suffers from alcoholism; her favorite foods are seasonal while her least favorite food is alcohol. Mario's favorite food is Japanese-style tomato spaghetti, while his least favorite food is shiitake mushrooms.

The other main character in the shorts is a weasel girl named Tashanna (Tā-chan (たーちゃん) in the Japanese version). Tashanna, 17 years old, is a weasel who aspires to be a fashion stylist or model in Tokyo and is always using technology (televisions, mobile phones, and cameras). In English Tashanna has a "weaselly accent" (いたちなまり, itachi namari) (bear in mind weasels in Japan are not associated with underhandedness) and ends her sentences with "y"s. In the Japanese version, she ends her sentences with "chi" (ち). She has not had a boyfriend in ten years and she is seeking a platonic boyfriend. She has a passion for bidding in auctions, but she gives up by the end. Tashanna's favorite food is apricot and mint tarts, and her least favorite food is sea urchin. The Japanese name originates from the word "multichannel" (多チャンネル, tachanneru) of digital broadcasting.

Bear Boy (Kogumagorō (こぐまゴロー)), also known as A Little Bear (くまのこ, Kuma no ko; literally "A bear cub"), is a Moon Bear and one of Domo's friends from the neighborhood; the timid cub enjoys playing baseball.

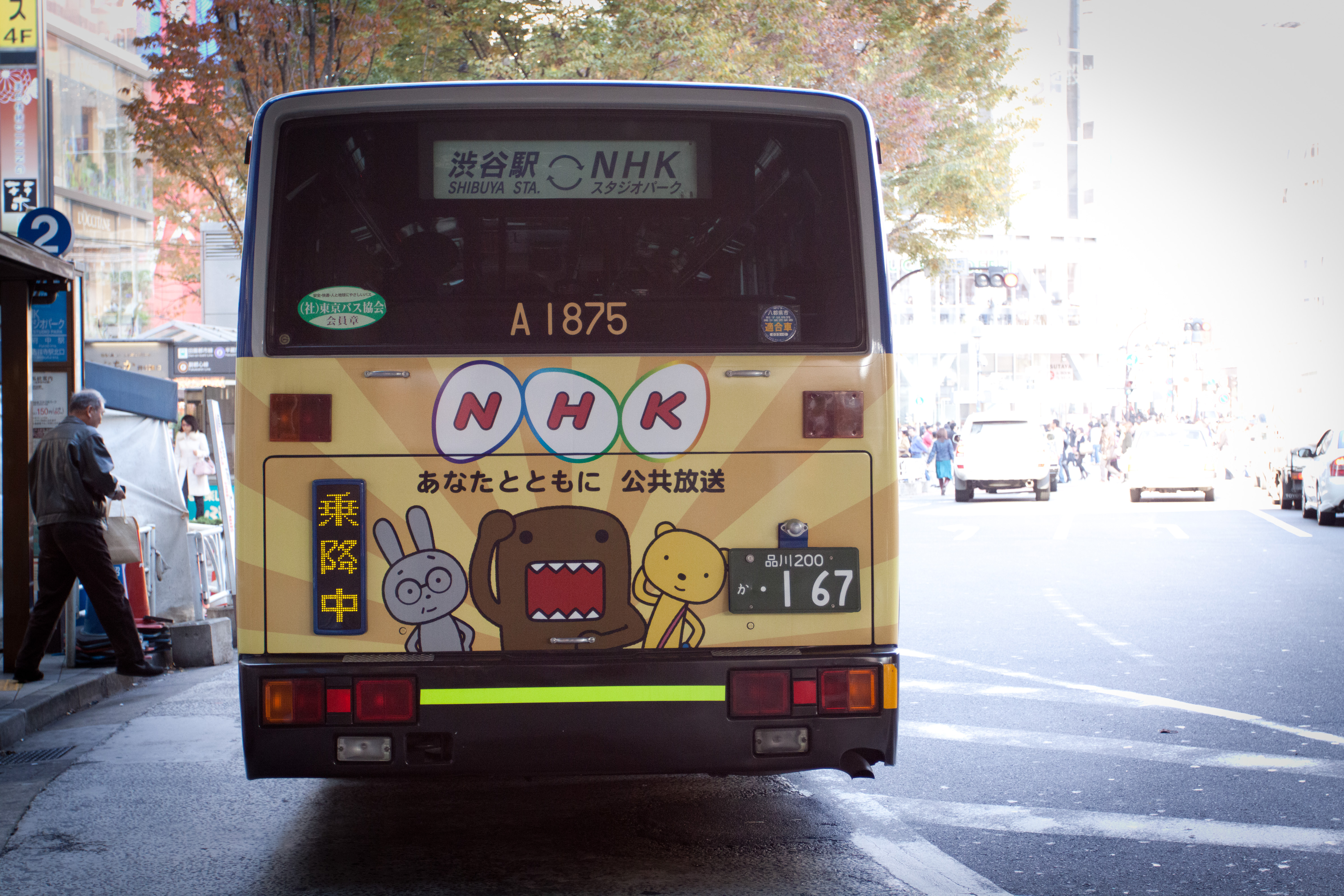
Domo (middle) and friends on a bus advertisement for NHK

Hee (Flower One (花一, Hanaichi)) and Haw (Flower Two (花二, Hanaji)) are pixie twins from a flower. Domo is the only individual who can see them.

The Fox Trio consists of Esther (Esuko (エスコ)), Brother Fox (あにきち, Aniki-chi), and Fox Boy (Konjirō (コンジロー)). Esther, the youngest member, enjoys producing crocodile tears, plotting schemes, and causing havoc. Brother Fox, the eldest member, dutifully cares for his youngest siblings and feels upset when referred to as "short-legged" (短足, tansoku). Fox Boy, having a quiet demeanor, converses with Domo and Bear Boy and prefers to read.

Hungry Bear (はらぺこぐま, Harapekoguma), a large and powerful brown bear, feels too hungry to take advantage of his strength.

The Ghost (Hyūtarou (ヒュ～たろう)) randomly appears and disappears.

== In other media ==
- A stop-motion children's television series based on the character, titled Domo TV, was co-produced by Nickelodeon and NHK. It was first announced in 2006 and premiered in October 2008 on Nicktoons Network. It continued to air until February 2009. Later that year, Nickelodeon also aired a series of 7-Eleven advertisements featuring Domo. Domo TV was released to DVD on July 1, 2009, along with every Domo commercial that had been produced to that date.
- Tokyopop published an original English-language manga based on the character titled Domo: The Manga in the United States and Canada. Clint Bickham created the stories and crafted the dialog; Bickham said that he did "pretty much everything short of drawing it." The stories were drawn by Priscilla Hamby (aka Rem), Lindsay Cibos, Jared Hodges, Sonia Leong, Maximo V. Lorenzo (in the special 7-11 edition only) and Erie Horita. Bickham decided to use a series of short stories instead of one long story to "recreate the feel of the original series," "so hopefully, reading a story from the manga will feel the same as watching an episode of the show." Bickham said that writing the stories became entertaining when he "got into the Domo mindset." The writer said that Domo's thoughts do not need to be expressed in words as they are "always very simple and innocent." Bickham added that sometimes other characters speak for him. Bickham said that the Domo: the Manga stories "are driven by situations instead of dialogue." To prepare for writing the series, Bickham watched each episode multiple times; Bickham intended to "get a feel for the characters so that the jump from stop-motion to manga would be as seamless as possible." He added that "more than anything, I had to have fun doing it. I don't think you can create a good Domo story without fun."
- On February 5, 2014, Domo celebrated its 15th anniversary with Domo Hollywood e Iku! (Domo Goes to Hollywood!), a television special which was premiered on March 28, 2014.
- In September 2015, the first music compilation based on Domo, Domo Loves Chiptune, was released on iTunes, Amazon, and all major music streaming services. The compilation features top artists in the Chiptune genre such Anamanaguchi and Disasterpeace. A Domo Loves Christmas compilation was released in November 2015.
- Domo became well known outside Japan through a mock public service announcement that circulated on the Internet depicting Domos chasing a kitten with the words stating: "Every time you masturbate... God kills a kitten." An article from ICv2 stated: "This phony PSA is quite out of character with Domo's image in Japan."
- Domo has 5 video games on the DSiWare on the Nintendo DSi Shop application for the Nintendo DSi. The 5 games are Crash-Course Domo, Hard-Hat Domo, Rock-n-Roll Domo, Pro-Putt Domo, and White-Water Domo. The Game Boy Advance game Domo-kun no Fushigi Terebi also features Domo-kun. On Facebook, Domo is featured in the social game Planet Domo.
- On June 13, 2026, a permanent Domo-themed character cafe named the Domo Cafe opened in Buena Park, California.
