= Neozoic =

Publication information
- Publisher: Red 5 Comics

Creative team
- Written by: Paul Ens
- Penciller: J. Korim
- Letterer: Troy Peteri
- Colorist: Jessie Lam

Neozoic is a science fiction/fantasy comic book published by Red 5 Comics. It is written by Paul Ens, who worked on Star Wars: Evasive Action. The art is done by J. Korim and Jessie Lam. The setting is in a different universe where dinosaurs did not become extinct and humans never became the dominant species.

The series has eight issues and they have all been gathered into one 216 page trade paper back as of May 2009. An eight-page comic ("Feeding Time") was put out in May 2010 for Red 5's Free Comic Book Day. In April 2013 part one of a four-part limited series, Neozoic: Trader's Gambit, was published.

== Premise ==
The story is set in an alternate universe where, 65 million years ago, debris from a space battle near Jupiter hit the asteroid that was supposed to wipe out the dinosaurs, causing a slight change in its trajectory. Instead of hitting Earth it crashed into the Moon, knocking off a large portion of its mass. As a result, dinosaurs continue to thrive and evolve, greatly reducing the degree to which mammals - including humans - gain dominance over the planet.

The protagonist in the alternate present is a young woman named Lilli Murko, an excellent hand-to-hand combatant who uses a sword and dagger to fight. She works for a group of dinosaur slayers known as the Predator Defense League, or PDL.

== Reception ==
Daniel Crown of IGN stated that "the artwork is fantastic and the world Ens creates is emphatic and fun" and gave the comic a score of 7.8 out 10.

== Collected editions ==
- Neozoic (2009)
- Neozoic: Trader's Gambit (2013)
