= Johnny Zito =

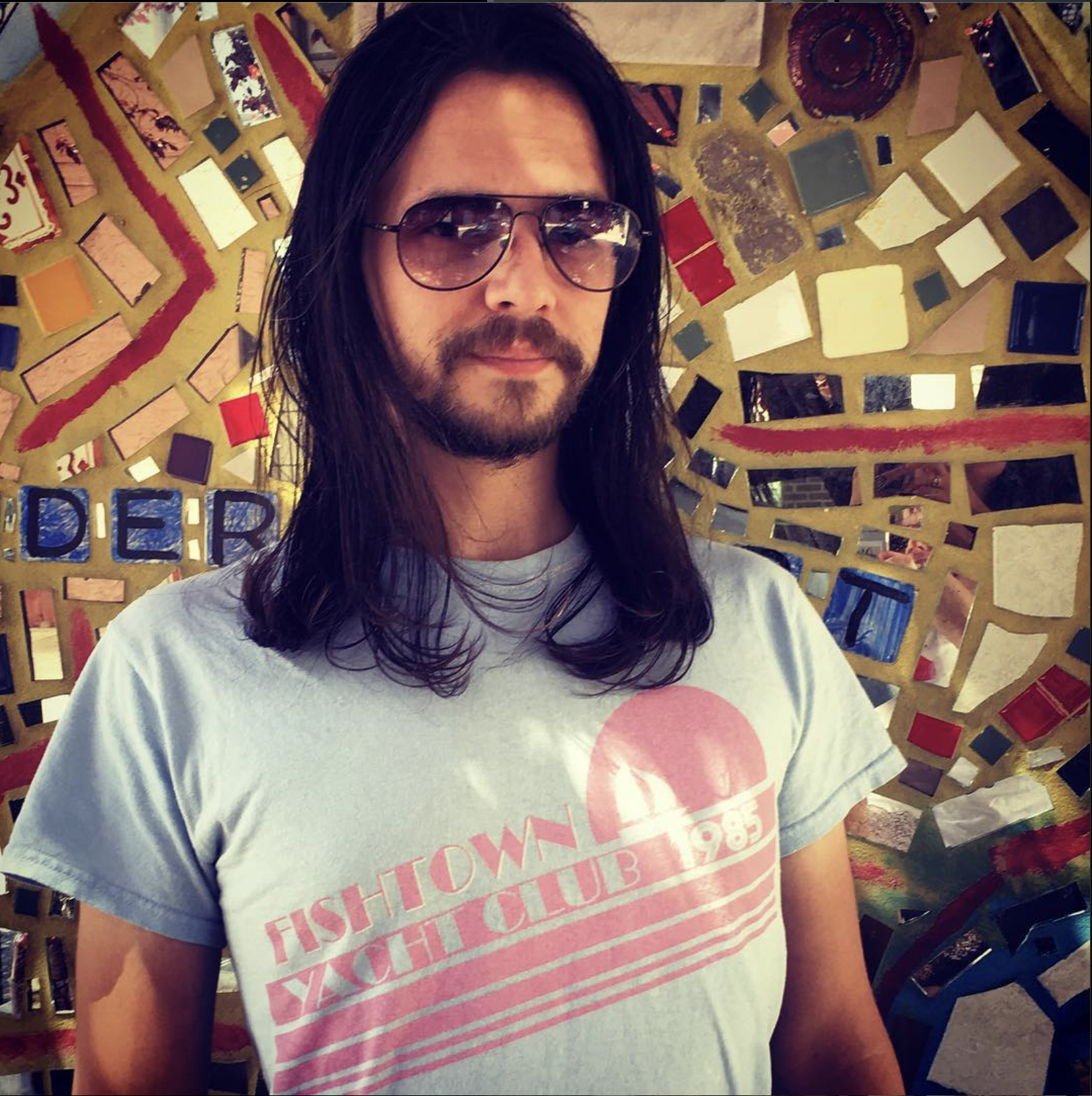
- Awards: Philadelphia Geek Award

Johnny Zito (born John-Paul Zito 1982) is a writer, film maker and artist best known for as a co-creator of Philadelphia studio South Fellini.

== Early life ==
Johnny Zito is a native of Philadelphia and graduated from Saint Joseph's Preparatory School in 2000. Afterwards, he attended Temple University obtaining degrees in Film, New Media and Theology.

== Career ==
Zito's early career began in print with political cartoons. Most notably for Review Publishing.

In 2008, along with co-writer Tony Trov, he won the March Zuda Comics competition with The Black Cherry Bombshells. The duo's sophomore effort, La Morté Sisters, was also purchased by Zuda Comics in 2009. Both comics were nominated for Harvey Awards in the Best Online Comic Category; 2009 and 2011 respectively.

When Zuda Comics dissolved in 2010, The Black Cherry Bombshells and La Morté Sisters were migrated to the DC Online imprint along with several other popular titles.

In 2009, Zito and Trov teamed with Comixology to digitally distribute a mini-series based on their self-published comic Carnivale De Robotique. Zito and Trov's webcomic based on the public domain character Moon Girl was digitally distributed through Comixology before being printed by Red 5 Comics in Spring of 2011. In 2010 they began digitally distributing a space-horror webcomic D.O.G.S. of Mars through Comixology. This webcomic was adapted in graphic novel form by Image Comics in 2011, and has been optioned as a film by High Treason Pictures.

Zito and Trov's production company, South Fellini, released their first feature film, Alpha Girls, in 2013 through Gravitas Ventures. In 2015, production began on a second feature film, American Exorcist. Zito has also designed T-shirts for Shirt.Woot, CBS, and Philadelphia's CheeseSteak Tees.

== Comics ==
DC Entertainment:

- The Black Cherry Bombshells (2008- 2011)
- La Morté Sisters (2009- 2011)

Comixology

- Carnivale De Robotique (2010)

Red 5 Comics

- Moon Girl (2011- 2013)

Image Comics

- D.O.G.S. of Mars (2012)

== Films ==
- Alpha Girls – 2013
- American Exorcist – 2018

== Awards ==
- 2009:
  - Harvey Award Nominee - Best Online Comics Work for The Black Cherry Bombshells
  - 48 Hour Film Project - Best Editing, Best Special Effects for The Kingpin of Pain
  - Finalist Set In Philadelphia Screenplay Film.org for La Morté Sisters
  - CBS Star Trek T-Shirt Design Competition - First place design;
