= John Dallaire =

American artist

John Dallaire is an American artist best known for work on the serialized comic The Black Cherry Bombshells on Zuda Comics. He has also done art for Lasers Dragons and Lies with John Zakour and Intergalactic Law: Grey Squad with Lisa Fary on Zuda as well as Intergalactic Law on Pink Raygun where he is the art director.
