= ComiXology =

Online comic distribution platform

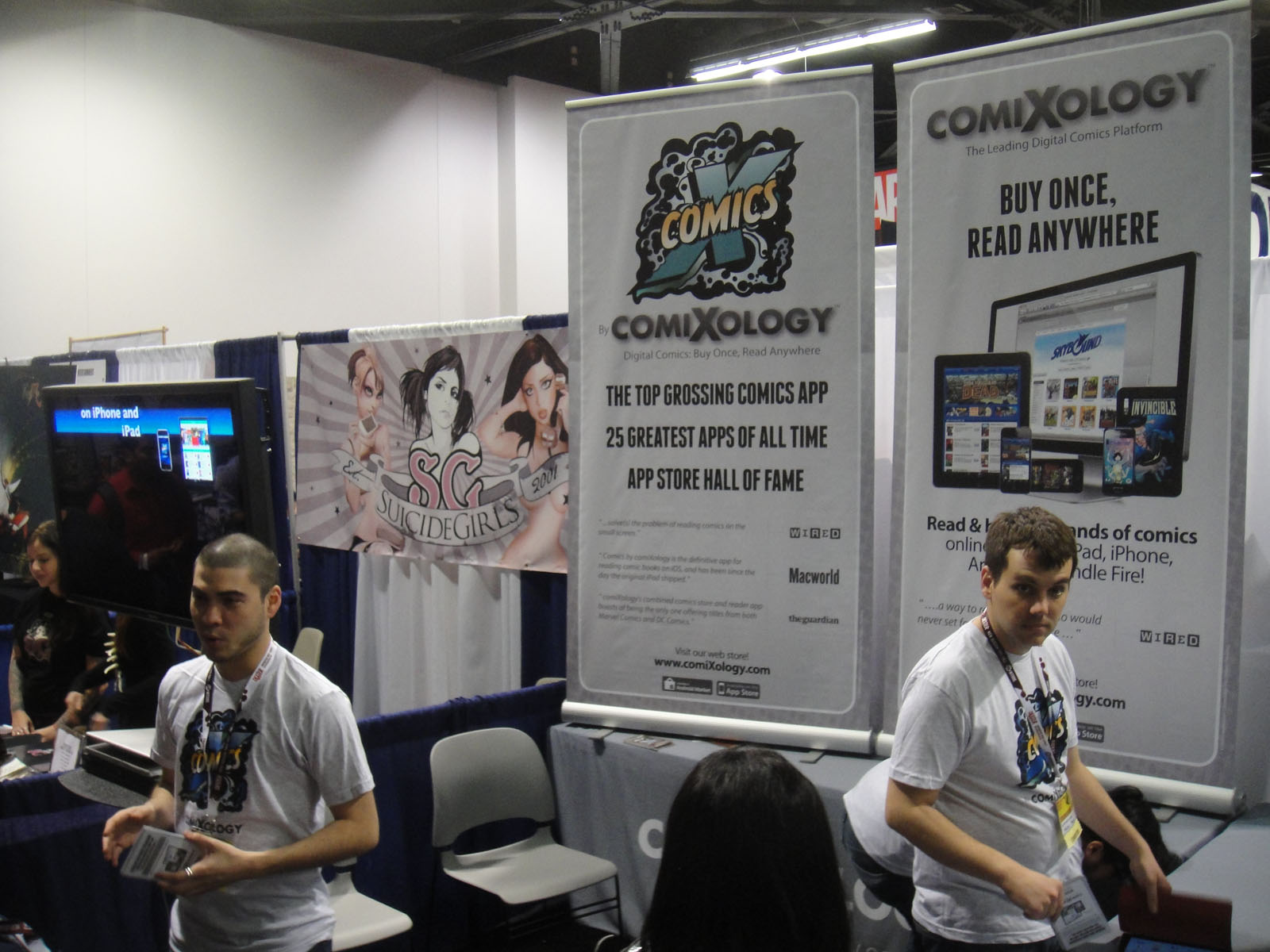
- A ComiXology booth at a convention in 2012
- Type: Subsidiary
- Founded: July 2007; 19 years ago
- Founder: David Steinberger, John Roberts, Peter Jaffe
- Defunct: December 4, 2023; 2 years ago
- Fate: Absorbed into Amazon Kindle
- Headquarters: New York City, U.S.
- Products: Digital comics distribution
- Parent: Amazon.com
- Website: www.amazon.com/kindle-dbs/comics-store/home

Iconology Inc., d/b/a ComiXology (styled comiXology), was a cloud-based digital distribution platform for comics owned by Amazon, with over 200 million comic downloads as of September 2013. At its height it offered a selection of more than 100,000 comic books, graphic novels, and manga across Android, iOS, Kindle Fire, Windows 10, and the Internet. In 2023, the ComiXology app was officially retired and the material was made available exclusively on the Amazon Kindle app.

ComiXology's digital platform with Guided View reading technology is used in the company's own branded applications, and is the engine used by most major comic book publishers in the United States, including Marvel Comics and DC Comics for their privately branded digital services. With the release of the third generation iPad and its Retina Display, ComiXology released a high-definition comic format dubbed CMX-HD. The company also provides tools for brick-and-mortar comic book retailers to participate in digital comic sales.

== Products ==
- ComiXology.com was launched July 2007 as an online community for comic book fans; the website allows readers to identify upcoming releases and develop pull lists (individual pre-orders) from local brick-and-mortar comic shops. The website displays weekly listings of new titles that can be viewed by issue: displaying cover art, credits, description, price, page count, and other information; the site also includes weekly columns, blogs, news, and podcasts. Users can rate and comment on individual comic books. As of July 24, 2014, ComiXology offers DRM-free downloads (in PDF and CBZ formats) for the comics available from selected publishers on its online store.
- Pull List (launched December 2008), a mobile comic bookstore locater providing readers with a digital Pull List tool, allowing fans to pre-order comics for pick up from local stores through the app. This app has been replaced by the Comics by comiXology app and the web app has the retail store locator included.
- Retailer Tools (launched February 2009), a suite for brick-and-mortar comic book retailers to optimize their presence online.
- Comics by ComiXology (launched July 2009), a digital comic book reader and store for mobile devices, including iOS (launched April 2010), Android, Windows 8 (via the Windows Store), and the Internet (web reader launched June 2010), that allows users to access their digital comic collection across multiple devices.

== History ==
The company was founded in 2007 by CEO David Steinberger, CTO John D. Roberts, and Peter Jaffe. Subsequent to winning the business plan competition at New York University, the company received seed financing from Kit McQuiston, New York Angels and Rose Tech Ventures.

In April 2014, Amazon acquired Comixology for an undisclosed sum, which The Motley Fool argued was an attempt to control the comic book market after Amazon Publishing's Jet City Comics imprint failed to achieve major market share after its July 2013 launch.

In May 2016, the company launched ComiXology Unlimited, a subscription service that gives digital access to thousands of comics to read from most major publishers for a monthly fee of $5.99. The service offers more than four thousand issues to its subscribers and launched on May 24, 2016, with available content updated on a monthly basis. According to the company, the service offers the widest subscription selection of digital comics in the world. ComiXology Unlimited contains a selection of titles from Image Comics, Dark Horse, IDW Publishing, BOOM! Studios, Dynamite Entertainment, Kodansha Comics, Oni Press, Valiant Entertainment, Archie Comics, Fantagraphics Books, Humanoids, Action Lab Entertainment, Aspen Comics, Magnetic Press, Zenescope Entertainment and more. ComiXology Unlimited is currently limited to the U.S.

ComiXology's Guided View technology allows readers to read through comics in full screen or from panel-to-panel, mimicking the natural movement of the eye as though readers were experiencing reading a print comic book.

In June 2018, the company announced ComiXology Originals, an initiative to publish creator-owned titles.

During 2021 Amazon.com was to close the ComiXology website in a move to integrate ComiXology into Amazon Kindle, but was delayed to 2022, due to community feedback. During February 2022, the ComiXology website updated their FAQ on their website with new information to indicate the coming changes which were brought about on February 17, 2022, to which ComiXology is only available on Amazon.com or through their update to the ComiXology app that was done two days earlier on February 15, 2022.

On December 4, 2023, the ComiXology app was officially retired, and all of the material was made available on mobile devices exclusively on the Amazon Kindle app.

== Content relationships ==
- ComiXology holds exclusive digital distribution rights to Youngblood and Armageddon Now from Rob Liefeld, original co-founder of Image Comics.
- ComiXology's first original digital title, Box 13, has been acquired by Red 5 Comics for print distribution. ComiXology also commissioned a sequel to the comic, titled The Pandora Project. Both Box 13 titles were created by the Harvey Award-winning team behind the Zuda Comics title High Moon - David Gallaher and Steve Ellis
- Moon Girl is an original comic published by ComiXology, based on a public domain comics character. The creative team on Moon Girl is Tony Trov, Johnny Zito, and Rahzzah.

=== ComiXology Originals ===
In 2018, ComiXology launched the ComiXology Originals banner with four titles; Savage Game, Superfreaks, Elephantmen 2261, and Ask For Mercy. New titles would follow in 2018 with the launches of Goliath Girls, Grave Danger, Hit Reblog: Comics That Caught Fire, Teenage Wasteland, The Dark, Delver and The Stone King. In March 2019 they launched Stone Star and picked up the second volume of the previously independent series The Pride. In the buildup to San Diego Comic-Con 2019 they announced Promethee 13:13 and a second season of Ask for Mercy, while at the show itself they announced a second season of Delver and new series Adora and the Distance and Afterlift. In September 2019 they launched four brand new titles with Breaklands, Field Tripping, The Black Ghost and Quarter Killer. In November 2019 they launched the original graphic novel Liebestrasse on the platform. In July 2021, writer Scott Snyder announced an eight-title digital first deal with ComiXology Originals. The first three, We Have Demons, Clear, and Night of the Ghoul, were all launched in October 2021.

== Controversies ==
In March 2013 during SXSW, an issue arose when Marvel Comics attempted to distribute over 700 comics for free via ComiXology for the Marvel #1 promotion. The ComiXology servers were unable to keep up with user demand, preventing users from obtaining the promotional comics, as well as from reading comics they had purchased. This led to a formal apology and the promotions being delayed. Soon afterward, the promotion was offered again and was reported to have "worked flawlessly". In the aftermath of the ensuing difficulties some users have raised concerns regarding access to their files should the platform ever shut down. To respond to this concern, in July 2014 selected publishers allow for DRM-free downloads of their comics.

On April 9, 2013, writer Brian K. Vaughan issued a statement on Fiona Staples's blog that Apple Inc. had prohibited the sale of Saga #12 through iOS. This statement was quickly reported by the media, the impetus for the "ban" was speculated to be in response to two panels that depicted oral sex between men in a small, inset image violated Apple's restrictions on sexual content. The issue was available through the ComiXology and Image Comics digital comics website stores. The ban was criticized by artists and writers, who pointed to similarly explicit content in previous issues and in other works sold through iTunes. William Gibson and others suggested that the restriction could have occurred specifically because the drawings at issue involved gay sex. A day later, Comixology announced that it had been they, not Apple, who had chosen not to make the issue available, based on their interpretation of Apple's rules, and that after receiving clarification from Apple, the issue would be sold on iOS devices. Brian K. Vaughan then issued a statement apologizing for the miscommunication.

After Amazon's purchase of ComiXology, the company removed the option of purchasing comics inside the iOS app. This change resulted in immediate internet backlash from the comic book reader community, criticizing Amazon's acquisition of the distributor. This change to ComiXology's structure has made readers concerned about the future of digital comic distribution.

On February 17, 2022, Amazon replaced the original ComiXology website using Amazon's native online storefront, as well as updating the app, and closing ComiXology's Submit program in favor of Kindle Direct Publishing, which is also used to self-publish eBooks on Amazon Kindle. The new changes on publishing have also led to concerns about the lower amount of royalties, as well as requiring publishers to manually format their works in order to make them available on the new website.

== Reception ==
In September 2011, ComiXology's Comics application was the highest-grossing application in the App Store, and together with the branded applications for other comics publishers, accounted for a majority of the five top-grossing iPhone Book apps.

Having consistently ranked as one of the top-grossing iPad apps in iTunes, ComiXology was called the "iTunes of comics" by The New York Times in May 2012. In 2011, comiXology ranked as number 10 in the top 20 grossing iPad apps for the year and also powered two other apps in the top 20 — Marvel and DC. In 2012, comiXology was ranked as the number 3 top grossing iPad app — the only app from 2011 to stay on the top ten list. After Apple reported annual iPad rankings in late 2013, it was revealed that ComiXology's Comics application had been the top non-game iPad app for three years running.

Press reception for the launch of ComiXology Unlimited was mostly positive, with journalists and bloggers focusing on the low price point, the 30-day free trial and the diverse collection of independent comics, graphic novels, and manga available at launch. Some critics pointed out, however, that only some trades in the series are available in the program, undermining the "unlimited" aspect of the subscription.

After Comixology became integrated under Amazon's native store front as well with the new app to replace its original store and reader in February 2022, it received massive negative criticism by both readers and its creators. Many criticized the new storefront as well as using the Kindle app as to read comic books which were considered unreadable by many readers.
