= Joshua Starnes =

American film critic (born 1976)

- Born: September 2, 1976 (age 48); United States
- Occupation: Film critic

Joshua Starnes (born September 2, 1976) is an American animation writer, comic book publisher film critic for ComingSoon.net and president of the Houston Film Critics Society.

== Career ==
Starnes was introduced to film criticism by his father while a high school student in Houston, Texas and began writing regularly for ComingSoon.net, a subsidiary of CraveOnline, in 2004 where he shares reviewing duties with Edward Douglas and Scott Chitwood. In 2009 he became vice president of the Houston Film Critics Society, and in 2012 he became president.

In 2015 he joined Red 5 Comics as co-publisher, expanding its line and partnering with King Features and Armory Films to develop new properties. He is the author of the graphic novels Spook with Lisandro Estherren and The Box with Raymond Estrada.

He is the co-writer for Kulipari: Dream Walker, starring Mark Hamill.
