= Every time you masturbate... God kills a kitten =

Internet meme created in 2002

The image

"Every time you masturbate... God kills a kitten" is the caption of an image created by a user on the Fark website in 2002 that quickly became an internet meme. The image features a kitten being chased by two Domo, the animated mascot of Japanese public broadcaster NHK, and has the tagline "Please, think of the kittens", which is a play on the phrase "think of the children".

== Origin ==
The phrase originally appeared as the headline "Fact: Every Time You Masturbate, God Kills a Kitten. How Many More Have to Die?" with a kitten photo on the cover of The Gonzo, a satirical publication produced by students at Georgetown University, in 1996.

The phrase later appeared in the form that brought it viral fame: as a caption of an image created by a member of the Fark website in 2002, which features a kitten being chased by two Domo mascots.

According to a 2007 New York Times Magazine article on Domo-kun, "Any major exhibition on the history of clowning around on the Internet would have to include [this image]". The article also described the meme itself as "resembling a public-service ad, with text that is sophomoric, funny and not worth printing here," adding "it has been referenced and forwarded so many times." A 2006 article from ICv2 stated, "Domo is probably best known outside Japan for his unauthorized appearance in a faux public service announcement that intones 'Every time you masturbate...God kills a kitten.' Needless to say this phony PSA is quite out of character with Domo's image in Japan."

== Cultural references ==
In 2003, actor Dudley Sutton produced a one-man comic show, Killing Kittens, at the Edinburgh Festival Fringe, based on the Internet phrase.

XXXchurch.com used the retouched kitten image in a 2005 e-mail campaign. Westwinds Community Church held events which included presentations by Craig Gross, the founder of XXXchurch.com, which soon became the target of criticism from the church's community. Fox News quoted Jay Porter, an individual who used to attend the church; Porter stated "'God kills a kitten every time you masturbate' is not an advisable message to direct at children".

In 2006, The Independent published an article which briefly referenced a "sex club called Killing Kittens", a name inspired by the phrase. Later, in 2014, The Guardian reported about Emma Sayle, the founder of Killing Kittens, detailing it as a company which organizes sex parties for young models and actors. When asked about the name of her company, she stated, "it's cyber-slang – every time someone masturbates, God kills a kitten. It's about pleasuring yourself, so it fits quite nicely with our brand."

In the English version of the 2004 videogame Phoenix Wright: Ace Attorney – Trials and Tribulations, the protagonist says: "I've gotta think of the kittens" while solving the final case of the game.

When appearing in the media, the phrase is sometimes varied. For example, in 2003, Daily Show correspondent Samantha Bee maintained a screensaver that showed kittens chased by vengeful ninjas, and the cut line, "Every time you masturbate, a ninja chops the head off a kitten."

== See also ==
- Lolcat
- Viral email
