= Fat City Reprise =

US musical group

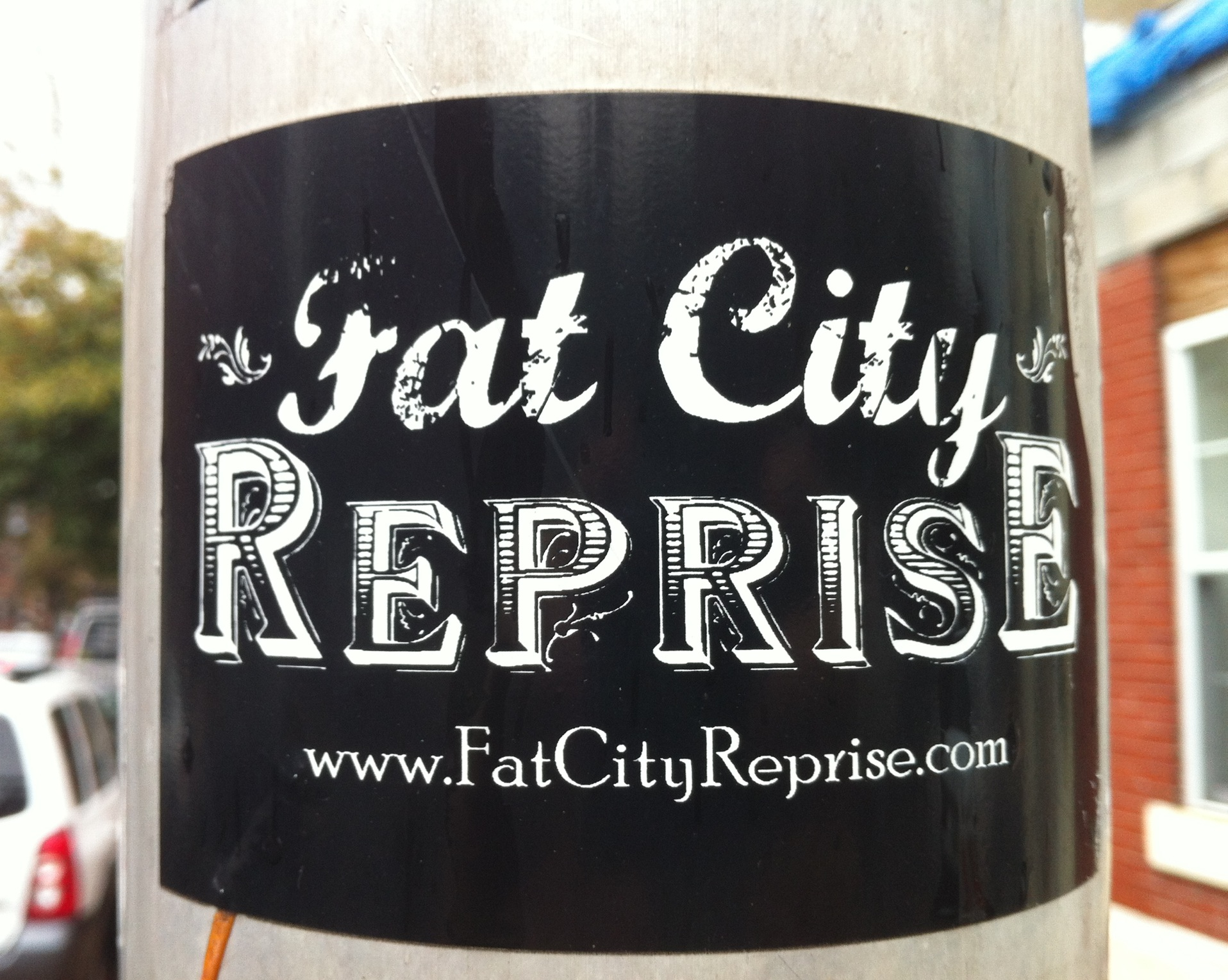

Background information
- Origin: Philadelphia, Pennsylvania, U.S.
- Genres: Indie rock
- Years active: 2003–2011
- Labels: Lowe
- Past members: Frank Pedano; Nick Anastasi; Tony Trov; Eric Cifone; Thomas J. Perko; James McCloskey; Jay Miraglia; Michael Vivas
- Website: Fat City Reprise on Myspace

Fat City Reprise was a five-piece rock band from South Philadelphia, Pennsylvania.

The name Fat City Reprise is derived from Hunter S. Thompson's failed bid for sheriff of Pitkin County, Colorado in 1970.

== History ==
Formed in early 2003, Fat City Reprise's original line-up consisted of Frank Pedano (vocals, keys), Eric Cifone (drums), Nick Anastasi (lead guitar), Tony Trov (vocals, bass guitar), and Thomas J. Perko (vocals, guitar). The band gained notoriety by distributing live bootlegs of their own shows.

Under the line-up of Anastasi (guitars), Miraglia (drums), Pedano (lead vocals, keys), Perko (guitar), and Vivas (bass, background vocals), the band began working with Mike Lowe of Lowe Records. They recorded and released their debut album at Larry Gold's Studio, the self-titled Fat City Reprise in May 2007. Halfway through the recording of the album, Perko departed. Any tracks retaining his guitar playing are credited on the album artwork. Lyrics and music are credited as "All songs by Fat City Reprise".

In February 2008, the Roots invited Fat City Reprise to perform at their Pre-Grammy party at the Key Club in Los Angeles where they performed with Patrick Stump, Seal, Travis Barker, MC Lyte, Doug E. Fresh, Bilal, Corinne Bailey Rae, and Travis McCoy of Gym Class Heroes. The band planned a West Coast Tour around the show and found so much success in California that they relocated from Philadelphia to Los Angeles.

In October 2009 Nick Anastasi and Michael Vivas left the band. Fat City Reprise's second studio album Pirate Radio was never released. The band officially ended with the departure of the last original member, Frankie Pedano, from Lowe Records in 2011.

== Discography ==
=== Albums ===
- Live at Grape Street Pub – 2005
- Fat City Reprise – 2007

=== EPs ===
- Temple University Sessions – 2004
- Cowgirl EP – 2005
