= Richard Bruning =

American comic book artist

- Born: February 7, 1953 (age 73) United States
- Areas: Graphic designer, cartoonist, editor, writer

Richard Bruning (born February 7, 1953) is an American graphic designer and comics creator.

== Biography ==
In 1979, Richard Bruning opened a design firm in Madison, Wisconsin, called Abraxas Studios. In the early 1980s, on staff at Capital Comics, he was editor-in-chief and art director for such publications as Nexus, Badger and Whisper until the company ceased operation in 1984.

After a year of freelancing in San Francisco, he moved to New York City in 1985 to become DC Comics’ design director. For the next five years he supervised and/or contributed to the design of titles including Watchmen and Batman: The Dark Knight Returns, as well as editing the DC-produced official sequel to the ITC TV series The Prisoner, Shattered Visage. He designed the branding of and logo design for DC's Vertigo (comics) mature-readers imprint. He also oversaw the development and packaging of graphic novels and DC's first collected editions.

In 1990, he left DC to form Brainstorm Unlimited, Inc. a freelance graphic design and corporate communications firm in New York. The company’s client list included HBO, Fine Line Features, Xerox, Children’s Television Workshop and others. He also wrote the Flash Gordon Sunday newspaper strip for King Features.

He returned to DC full-time in 1996 as vice president-creative director. He was promoted to senior vice-president in 2002. He helped create DC's new company logo, known colloquially as the DC Spin, in 2005. In 2010, Bruning left DC to return to freelancing with a primary focus on cartooning.

During 2016 he wrote and drew a twice-weekly online comic strip called "Bob! the Presidential Atheist" which dealt with politics, atheism and social issues.

Starting in 2017, he became art director for Berger Books, an imprint of Dark Horse Comics headed by his wife, Karen Berger.

Beginning in 2020 he became art director, designer & letterer for Lapid Children's Books.

== Personal life ==
Bruning is married to former-DC Comics senior vice president-Vertigo executive editor Karen Berger.

=== Writing ===
In 1990, Bruning wrote the miniseries Adam Strange: The Man of Two Worlds, which revived the titular DC science-fiction character. The three volumes were illustrated by brothers Andy Kubert and Adam Kubert and collected into book form in 2003. The first issue of the 1999 Vertigo horror anthology Flinch features his story "Rocketman" with art by Jim Lee, collected in book form in 2015. He also wrote the Eisner-nominated Best Short Story "Electric China Death" for Gangland #4, with pencilling and coloring by Mark Chiarello, collected in book form in 2000.

== Bibliography ==
=== As writer ===
- "A Sense of Obligation" (with Kevin Nowlan) in Tales of the Green Lantern Corps Annual 3, DC Comics, 1987
- Adam Strange: The Man of Two Worlds #1-3 (with Andy and Adam Kubert, DC Comics, March–May 1990)
- "Reflections Of A Deep Fantasy" (with Steve Bove, in Secret Origins #50, DC Comics, August 1990)
- "Electric China Death" (with Mark Chiarello) in Gangland #4, Vertigo, September 1998
- "Rocket-Man" (with Jim Lee, in Flinch #1, Vertigo, June 1999)
