= TYO Inc. =

Japanese media production company

- Native name: 株式会社TYO
- Type: Kabushiki gaisha
- Founded: 2 April 1982; 44 years ago
- Headquarters: Akasaka, Minato, Tokyo, Japan
- Owner: Kanamel (100%)
- Number of employees: 280 (2023)
- Parent: Nippon Television
- Website: tyo.co.jp

TYO Inc. (株式会社TYO, Kabushiki gaisha Tī Wai Ō) is a Japanese media production company and wholly owned subsidiary of Kanamel, itself a subsidiary of Nippon Television US-based The Carlyle Group previously owned Kanamel from 2021 to 2026.

TYO was founded as a television advertisement production company and has the second largest market share in Japan. The company name 'TYO' comes from the city code for Tokyo used by the International Air Transport Association. Although the company once fell into a management crisis, it has since managed to rebuild itself.

== History ==
The company was founded as TYO Inc. (株式会社ティー・ワイ・オー, Kabushiki gaisha Tī Wai Ō) in April 1982.

In April 2002, the companies shares were listed over the counter (now JASDAQ.)

In July 2010, TYO merged with nine major advertising subsidiaries. The merged companies started operating as divisions.

In October 2013, TYO moved to the second division of the Tokyo Stock Exchange, and then to the first division in January 2014.

On 11 July 2016, AOI Pro. announced a merger through the establishment of a holding company. On 28 December, TYO was delisted from the first division of the Tokyo Stock Exchange.

On 4 January 2017, TYO merged with AOI Pro. with the establishment of the holding company AOI TYO Holdings Inc. (AOI TYO Holdings株式会社, AOI TYO Holdings Kabushiki gaisha) (later renamed Kanamel.)

In 2018, TYO relocated their head office to Ebisu, Shibuya, Tokyo.

On 23 July 2019, TYO entered a capital business partnership with AnyProjects Inc.

On 4 January 2021, as part of company restructuring, TYO Inc. (株式会社ティー・ワイ・オー, Kabushiki gaisha Tī Wai Ō) split off its advertising business to a new company called TYO Inc. (株式会社TYO, Kabushiki gaisha Tī Wai Ō) and renamed itself to xpd Inc. (株式会社xpd, Kabushiki gaisha Ikusupīdī). Simultaneously, xpd Inc. merged Quark tokyo Inc., Zeo Inc., TYO Digital Works Inc. and TYO Public Relations Inc. In March, xpd Inc. relocated their offices to Akasaka, Minato, Tokyo.

In September 2021, Studio Cruise, a subsidiary of The Carlyle Group, acquired Kanamel.

== Operations ==
- MONSTER - Video production.
- TYO drive - Video production.
- PRO2 - Advertisement production.
- SPARK - Branding, advertisement planning and direction.
- Camp KAZ - Video production.
- Offering Management - Advertisement production.
- Creative Incubation - Consulting, creative solutions.
- Dwarf - Character planning and development, stop motion animation production.

TYO used to operate an in house video game production division.

== Group Companies ==
- K&L - Advertisement communications.
- Matsuri - Music video planning and production, fashion video media planning and production.
- Rabbit Digital Group - Digital marketing service.

=== Former Group Companies ===
- Tsuburaya Productions - Acquired in 2007. Film production and copyright provision, joint venture with Bandai. On 2 April 2010, TYO sold all its shares to amusement company Fields.
  - Tsuburaya Enterprises - Acquired in 2007. program distribution and copyright provision. Merged with Tsuburaya Productions on 7 January 2008.
  - Buildup - Acquired in 2007. Modelling and CG planning and production. Merged with Tsuburaya Productions on 7 January 2008.
- Hal Film Maker - Animation planning and production. Merged with Yumeta Company on 1 July 2009.
  - Yūhodō - Animation production. Hal Film Maker subsidiary.
- Digital Frontier - CG planning and production. In April, 2010, TYO sold all its shares to amusement company Fields.
  - GEMBA - CG planning and production.
  - Saruchin - CG planning and production.
- 5pb. - Music production, video game development. On 15 April 2009, all shares were transferred to 5pb. representative Chiyomaru Shikura and left the group.
- Suzak - Video game development. Left the group on 15 April 2009.
- Sting - Video game development. Left the group on 30 April 2009.
- Rize Dragon - Video game development.
- Genterprise - Video game development.
- Doga Kobo - Animation production. On 23 April 2009, all shares were transferred to Doga Kobo representative Ryuu Ishiguro and left the group.
- TYO Animations - Animation production. Sold to Graphinica on 30 November 2017.
- Real-T - Anime post-production.
- Pep Planning - Even planning, production, operation and management. Merged with Zeo Inc. on 1 January 2021.
- Jigowatt - Media production. Merged with Zeo Inc. on 1 January 2021.
- Ludens - CG, digital media planning and production. Merged with TTR Inc. on 1 January 2021.
- TYO Digital Works - Web advertisement production. Merged with xpd Inc. on 4 January 2021.
- Zeo - Marketing communications. Merged with xpd Inc. on 4 January 2021.
- TYO Public Relations - Advertisement communications. Merged with xpd Inc. on 4 January 2021.
- TTR - TV advertisement production, video post production work, video photography work, CGI production. Merged with TREE Digital Studio Inc. on 4 January 2021.
