= Moon Girl (EC Comics) =

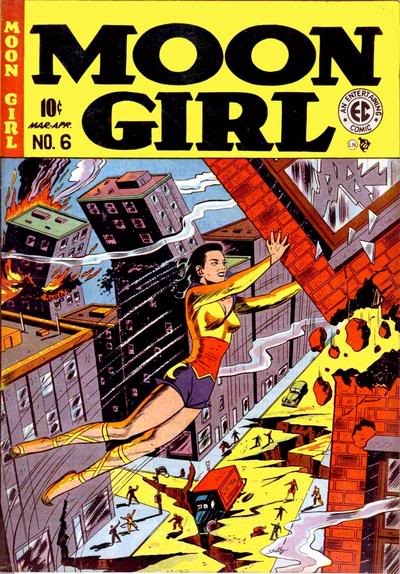
- Moon Girl #6 (1949)

Publication information
- Publisher: EC Comics comiXology; Red 5 Comics
- First appearance: Moon Girl and the Prince #1 (fall 1947)
- Created by: Max Gaines; Gardner Fox; Sheldon Moldoff

In-story information
- Alter ego: Clare Lune

Moon Girl is a fictional character published by EC Comics from 1947 to 1949. Moon Girl is a character from the Golden Age of Comic Books and has since passed into the public domain. Her secret identity is Claire Lune, a junior high history teacher.

Like DC Comics' Wonder Woman, Moon Girl was the princess of an isolated tribe of warrior women, although in Moon Girl's case, in Samarkand, fighting evil in her telepathically controlled flying moonship. Her powers derived from a Moon rock. Her love interest was Prince Mengu, who tried to invade her kingdom in Samarkand, but became her companion and fellow teacher in America.

== Publication history ==
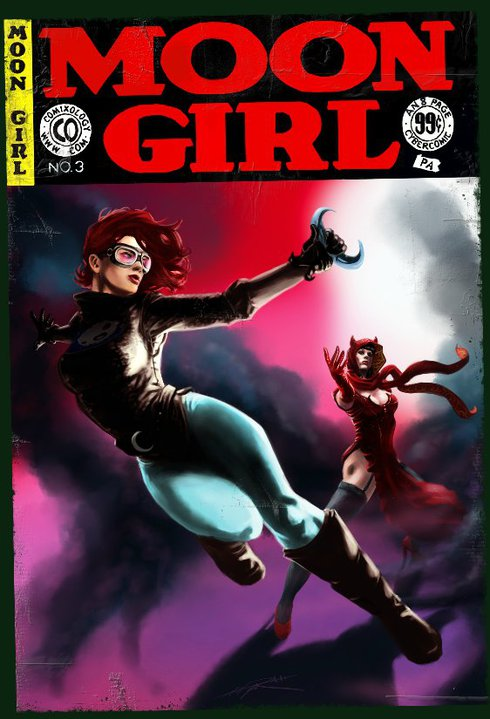
2010 ComiXology version of Moon Girl

Bill Woolfolk and Sheldon Moldoff created the character and debuted in fall 1947's The Happy Houlihans #1. After that appearance, the character was immediately spun off into her comic, Moon Girl and the Prince.

The original EC Moon Girl title went through multiple name changes (and a final genre change) as explained by Mark James Estren in his A History of Underground Comics:

A trend toward crime and adventure comics was developing, and E.C. was in the forefront—staying in the field of love comics and Western stories as well. But the special E.C. style was emerging fast as the forties waned. It was a style that never took itself completely seriously; when an adventure comic did not make it after three titles were tried (Moon Girl and the Prince, then simply Moon Girl, then Moon Girl Fights Crime), the book was changed to a love comic with completely different settings and characters, but with an oddly familiar title: A Moon, a Girl... Romance. Moon Girl #5, by the way, had a story with a title that looked forward to the great horror comics of a few years later: "The Corpse with Will Power".

Moon Girl and the Prince lasted a single issue (fall 1947), and ran as Moon Girl for issues #2–6. It became Moon Girl Fights Crime! for two issues, before concluding its run as A Moon, a Girl...Romance with issues #9–12. Moon Girl appears only in the story "I Was a Heart Pirate" in issue #9 (Sept-Oct 1949) and no subsequent issue. The series continued as Weird Fantasy beginning with issue #13.

The Moon Girl story is one of two credited with starting the trend in horror comics at EC.

In 2010, Moon Girl was revived as a comiXology title by Tony Trov, Johnny Zito and Rahzzah. This new story was then published in printed form as a five-part comic book series by Red 5 Comics starting in May 2011. It depicted Claire Lune as a foreign princess living in the United States. This iteration of the character had powers granted by a moon rock.
