= Tsuneo Gōda =

Japanese director and stop motion animator

- 合田 経郎
- Born: 1967 (age 58–59)
- Education: Japan Institute of Moving Images

Tsuneo Gōda (合田 経郎, Gōda Tsuneo) is a Japanese stop motion animator. He is known for creating the character Domo (Domo-kun), the official mascot of Japanese public broadcasting company NHK, as well as directing an animated TV series starring Domo. He is also the founder of studio dwarf inc., an animation studio specializing in stop motion animation and character design.

He has also directed the stop motion animation film Komaneko – The Curious Cat and the three-minute stop motion music video "I am a Bear," which is based on the Hikaru Utada song "Boku wa Kuma."

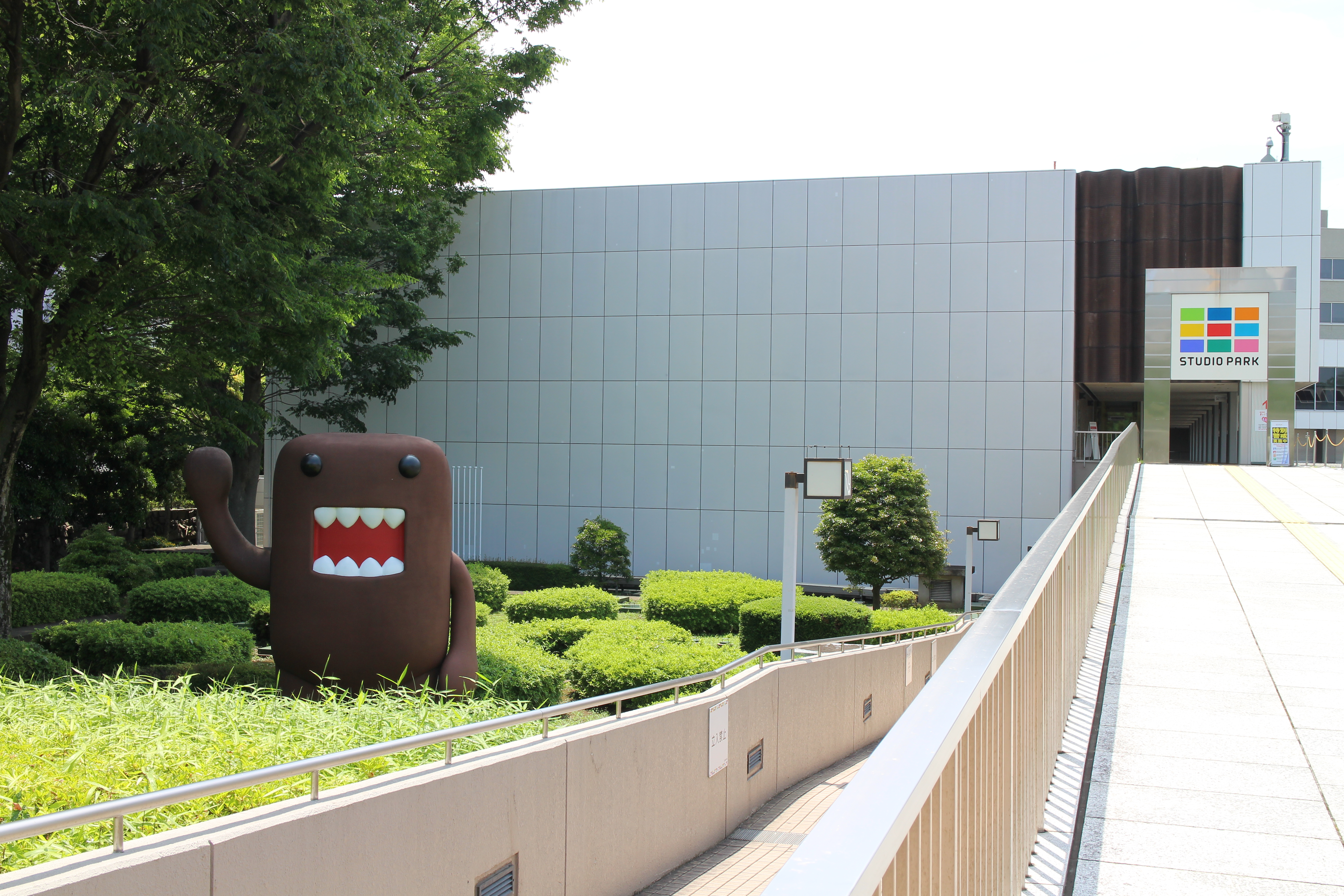
A life-size Domo-kun statue in front of the NHK Studio Park.

In 2011, Gōda was awarded the Inkpot Award for his work on Domo and other animated productions from dwarf studios.

== Career ==
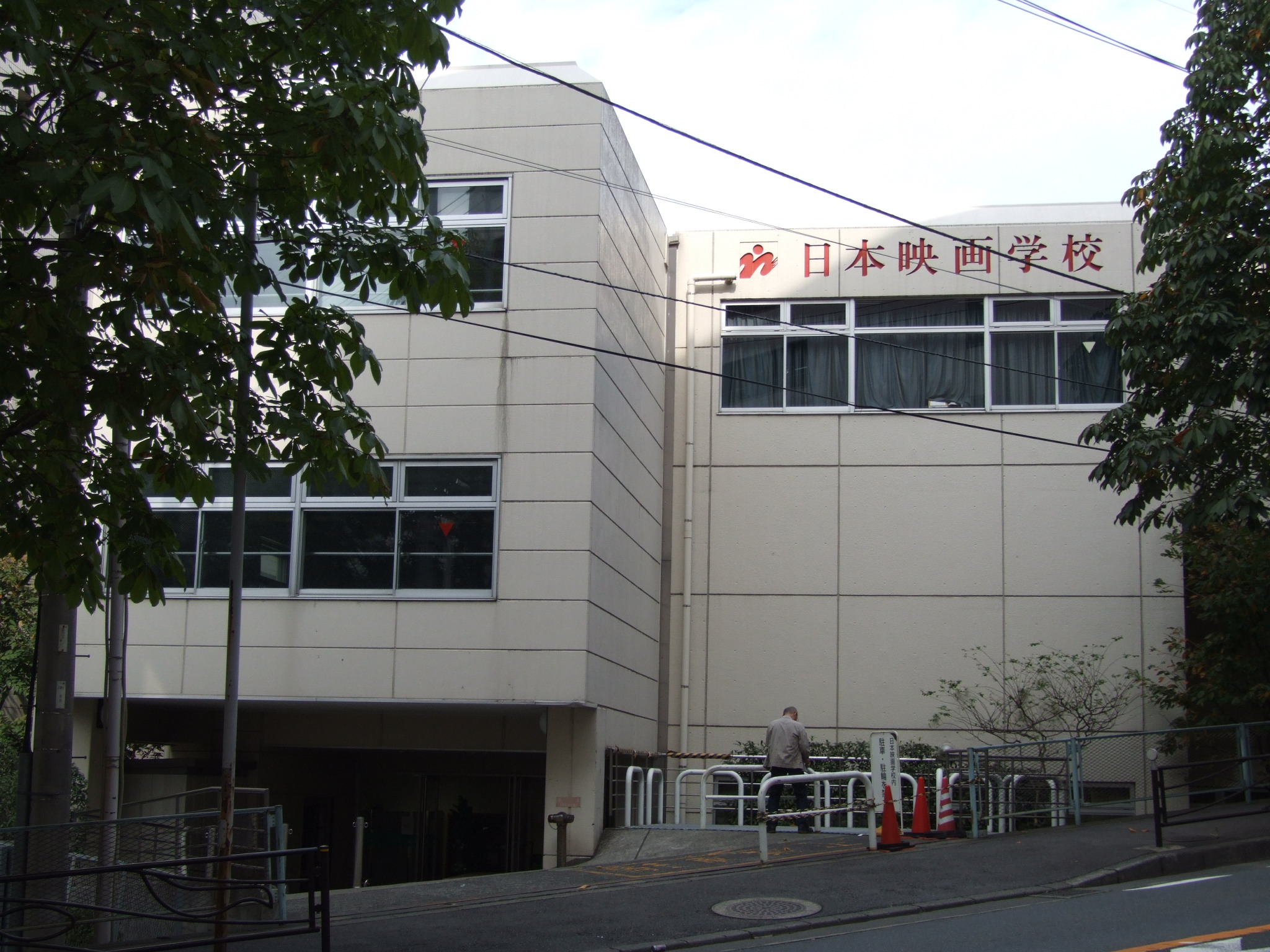
Japan Academy of Moving Images, where Tsuneo graduated in 1987.

Gōda graduated from the Japan Academy of Moving Images (formerly Japan Academy of Moving Images) in 1987 and began working at Dentsu Tec Inc. for three years until 1990. He freelanced for six years before joining TYO Productions Inc. in 1996 as part of their Creative Department. In September 2003, he established dwarf studios where he currently works as director and character designer.

== Filmography ==
Year	Title	Role
2006	I am a Bear	Director
2007	Makuma's Foreign Journey	Director
2008	Domo	Director, Producer
2009	Komaneko: The Curious Cat	Director
2009	The Curious Cat's Christmas	Director
2011	PLUG, the New World	Director, Writer
2011	I'm a Bear, too	Director
2013	Komaneko: Home Alone	Director
2014	By Your Side	Director
2015	Komaneko no orusuban	Director
2016	The Curious Kitty & Friends	Director, Executive Producer
2017	To & Kyo	Director
2018	Mogu & Perol	Director
