= Southwork =

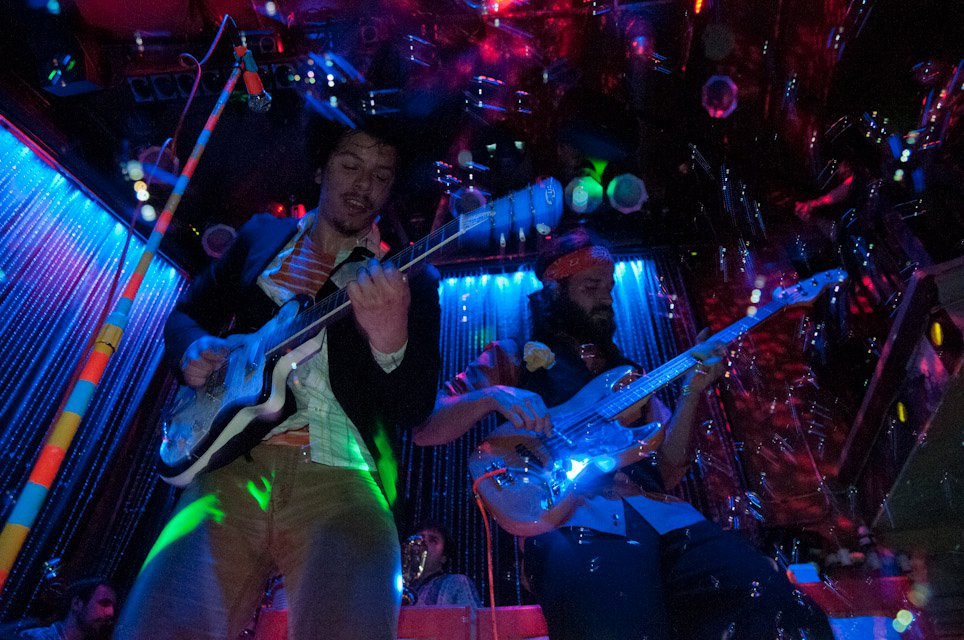
- Southwork playing at Johnny Brenda's in Philadelphia

Background information
- Origin: Philadelphia, Pennsylvania, United States
- Genres: Indie rock
- Years active: 2011–present
- Labels: Writtenhouse Records
- Members: Mike Vivas - Guitar; Mike Vogel - Key Board; Joe Smith - Bass; Joe Reno - Drums; Alan Smith - Baritone Saxophone; Erich Miller - Trumpet; Tony Trov - Tenor Saxophone
- Website: southwork.net

Southwork is an American seven piece indie rock band, based in Philadelphia, Pennsylvania, United States. The band features a horn section as well as layered vocal harmonies and percussion. The band produced their latest studio album Wear Your Heart Out in 2014.

== Discography ==
=== Albums ===
- Arise (December 2012, Writtenhouse Records)
- Alpha Girls Original Motion Picture Soundtrack (Writtenhouse Records)
- Seasons Passing EP July 2013
- Wear Your Heart Out August 2014
- Southwork "Self-Titled" EP January 2017
