= The Black Cherry Bombshells =

American post-apocalyptic webcomic

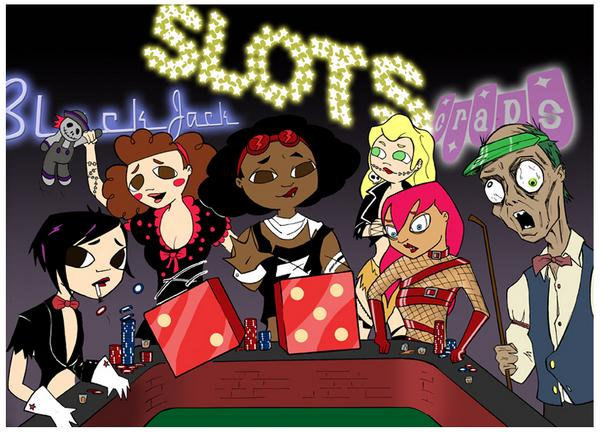

Publication information
- Publisher: Zuda Comics (DC Comics)
- Format: Webcomic
- Genre: Post-apocalyptic fiction, Zombie fiction, Crime fiction
- Publication date: 2008–2011
- Main character(s): Regina, Megan, Frankie, Red, Angel

Creative team
- Created by: Tony Trov; Johnny Zito
- Written by: Tony Trov; Johnny Zito
- Artist: Sacha Borisich
- Colorist: John Dallaire
- Editor: Kwanza Johnson

The Black Cherry Bombshells is an American post-apocalyptic webcomic created and written by Tony Trov and Johnny Zito, illustrated by Sacha Borisich, and colored by John Dallaire. Originally published by Zuda Comics, the digital publishing imprint of DC Comics, the series won Zuda's March 2008 webcomics competition.

Set in a post-apocalyptic Las Vegas where men have become flesh-eating zombies, the series follows an all-female gang of bootleggers struggling for control of the city's criminal underworld. It combines elements of zombie horror, gangster fiction, and dark comedy.

The Black Cherry Bombshells was nominated for the 2009 Harvey Award for Best Online Comics Work.

== Publication history ==
=== Zuda Comics ===
The Black Cherry Bombshells was selected as the winner of Zuda Comics' March 2008 competition, part of DC Comics' initiative to publish original webcomics through an online submission and reader-voting system.

The series was created by writers Tony Trov and Johnny Zito, with artwork by Sacha Borisich and coloring by John Dallaire. It was edited by Kwanza Osajyefo, who was professionally credited as Kwanza Johnson during his tenure at Zuda.

The webcomic was serialized through Zuda's website, with new installments appearing twice weekly on Mondays and Wednesdays. In an October 2008 interview with ComicMix, Trov and Zito discussed developing the series through a detailed story outline and scripts written in consultation with Borisich, who contributed to decisions about pacing and composition.

The creators also used social networking platforms, including MySpace and Facebook, to promote the series and communicate with readers.

=== Later publication ===
Following the closure of Zuda's original website in 2010, The Black Cherry Bombshells remained associated with DC Comics' digital publishing catalogue.

The series was subsequently re-released in 2014 through South Fellini, the creative studio established by Trov and Zito.

== Synopsis ==
In a post-apocalyptic future, a mutation has transformed the world's men into flesh-eating zombies. The surviving women have formed rival gangs competing for territory, resources, and control of criminal enterprises.

In Las Vegas, the Black Cherry Bombshells are an all-female gang of bootleggers led by Regina, an outcast whose organization has become increasingly influential.

Their growing control of the city's illicit trade brings them into conflict with a powerful crime boss known as the King, a woman whose appearance and persona draw on the imagery of Elvis Presley.

Megan, a resourceful newcomer with a concealed agenda, joins the Bombshells and becomes increasingly divided between her original objectives and her loyalty to the gang.

The story follows the shifting alliances and rivalries among the city's female gangs against the continuing threat of the zombie population.

== Development and influences ==
Trov and Zito developed The Black Cherry Bombshells as a combination of post-apocalyptic horror and gangster fiction.

In an October 2008 interview with David Gallaher for ComicMix, Trov characterized the series as combining zombie survival with a crime story centered on an all-female cast.

The creators cited several influences, including the zombie films of George A. Romero, the work of director Dario Argento, and Quentin Tarantino's Reservoir Dogs.

Trov also identified Borisich's visual approach as an important part of the series' identity, particularly her combination of exaggerated cartoon violence and character designs influenced by animation.

The creative team structured the story around short installments intended to function both as individual episodes and as chapters in a longer narrative. According to Zito, each installment was designed to provide a self-contained reading experience while advancing the overall plot.

== Reception ==
The Black Cherry Bombshells attracted industry recognition following its debut through Zuda Comics.

In 2009, the series was nominated for the Harvey Award for Best Online Comics Work, alongside other nominees including High Moon, The Night Owls, Least I Could Do, and PvP.

The nomination recognized the work of creators Tony Trov and Johnny Zito. The award was ultimately presented to High Moon, by David Gallaher, Steve Ellis, and Scott O. Brown.

== Awards and nominations ==
Year	Award	Category	Result
2009	Harvey Awards	Best Online Comics Work	Nominated

== See also ==
- Zuda Comics
- South Fellini
- Zombie apocalypse
- Webcomic
