= Zuda Comics =

DC Comics imprint for webcomics

- Type: Imprint of DC Comics
- Industry: Publishing
- Founded: 2007
- Defunct: 2010
- Key people: Paul Levitz; Richard Bruning; Ronald Perazza; Kwanza Johnson; Nika Denoyelle; Dave McCullough
- Products: Webcomics; Comic books
- Parent: DC Comics (Time Warner)

Zuda Comics was a webcomics imprint of DC Comics that operated from 2007 until 2010. The imprint published original comics selected through reader competitions and editorial commissions.

Several Zuda titles received industry recognition. High Moon won the 2009 Harvey Award for Best Online Comics Work, while Jeremy Love's Bayou received five Glyph Comics Awards in 2009. Bayou, Volume 1 was also selected for the American Library Association's 2010 Top Ten Great Graphic Novels for Teens.

== History ==
In July 2007, Zuda Comics imprint was launched to publish new material featuring new characters online. The site's content was chosen by the users through monthly competitions, as "the majority of the web comics will be selected by Zudacomics.com's visitors, who will vote on new web comics presented to them in periodic competitions". The first commissioned ongoing strips and material competing for the public vote were published on October 30 the same year. Zuda removed the competition aspect in April 2010 and in July, soon after the launch of DC's digital comics service, Zuda was closed and folded into the new digital publishing arm.

== Competition mechanics ==
Comic creators were invited to submit their own eight-page comics, and each month ten were selected to compete by editorial. Users could vote for their favorite and the winner received a contract to continue their comic on Zuda. When the contract was filled, if the comic was liked enough it could be renewed for an additional "season". Occasionally an "instant winner" was chosen to receive a contract without having to compete. In July 2008, an "invitational" was held in which losing comics were invited back to compete.

== Staff ==
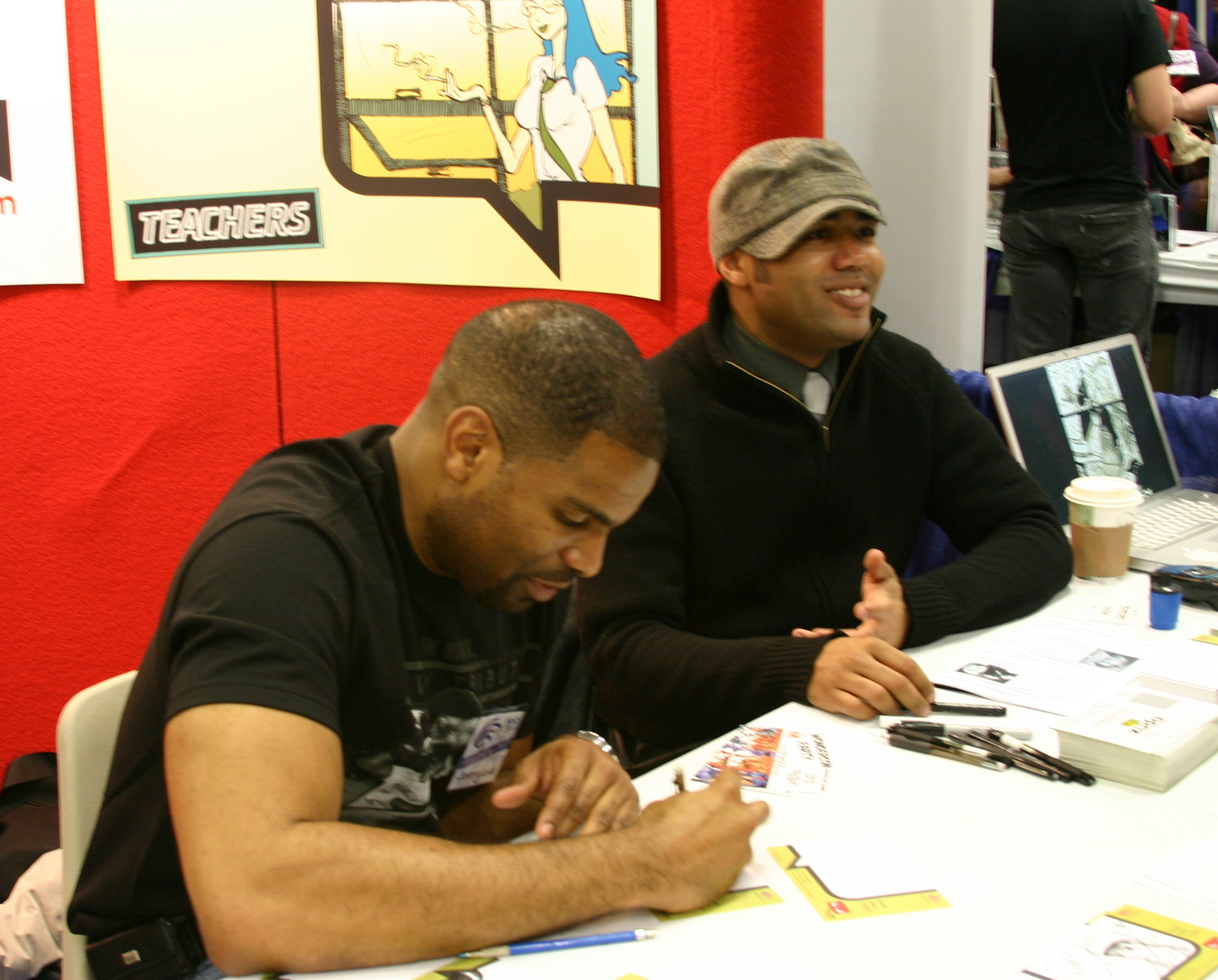
Jeremy Love and Kwanza Johnson

The Zuda staff consisted of:

- Paul Levitz – Publisher
- Richard Bruning – SVP-Creative Director
- Ron Perazza – VP of Creative Services
- Kwanza Osajyefo Johnson – DC Comics Online Editor
- Nika Vagner – DC Comics Online Assistant Editor
- Jessica Numsuwankijkul – DC Comics Assistant Editor
- Dave McCullough – DC Comics Online Technology Manager

== Titles ==
Instant winners

- Bayou by Jeremy Love
- The Night Owls by Peter Timony and Bobby Timony
- Street-Code by Dean Haspiel
- The Imaginary Boys by Carlos López Bermúdez
- I Rule The Night by Kevin Colden
- Bottle of Awesome by Andy Belanger and Ian Herring
- La Morté Sisters by Tony Trov, Johnny Zito & Christine Larsen
- The Puppet Makers by Molly Crabapple and John Leavitt

Competition winners

- High Moon (November 2007 – 2010)
- Pray for Death (December 2007)
- Supertron (January 2008 – 2010)
- Road (February 2008 – 2010)
- The Black Cherry Bombshells (March 2008 – 2010)
- Melody (April 2008)
- Celadore (May 2008)
- Dual (June 2008 – 2010)
- Re-Evolution (July 2008)
- Gulch (August 2008)
- Blood Hunter (September 2008 – 2010)
- Azure (October 2008 – 2010)
- Extracurricular Activities (November 2008)
- Devil's Wake (December 2008 – 2010)
- Safe Inside (January 2009 – 2010)
- The Hammer (February 2009)
- Deadly (March 2009 – 2010)
- Earthbuilders (April 2009 – 2010)
- Lily of the Valley (May 2009 – 2010)
- Sidewise (June 2009 – 2010)
- RockStar (July 2009 – 2010)
- Absolute Magnitude (August 2009 – 2010)
- Goldilock (September 2009 –2010)
- Eldritch (April 2010)

== Print editions ==
- Bayou by Jeremy Love, June 2009
- High Moon, September 2009
- The Night Owls, March 2010
- Celadore, October 2010

== Reception ==
Zuda Comics attracted attention following its announcement in July 2007 for its combination of original webcomics, reader participation, and the financial backing of DC Comics. Its emphasis on original properties rather than established superhero franchises was viewed by some commentators as an opportunity for experimentation within mainstream comics publishing.

In July 2007, Newsarama interviewed several comics and webcomics professionals about the announcement of Zuda Comics. Writer Warren Ellis expressed interest in the imprint's potential to attract new audiences and establish an online community, while raising concerns about intellectual-property rights and DC Comics' ability to manage that community. Cartoonist R. Stevens welcomed the opportunities offered by an established publisher but cautioned creators against treating corporate publishing agreements as their only path to professional success.

=== Critical response and artistic innovation ===
Following the imprint's launch in October 2007, Heidi MacDonald of The Beat praised the originality and stylistic diversity of its publications, describing them as "the freshest feeling material DC has put out in ages." MacDonald contrasted Zuda's creative variety with what she regarded as the increasingly restrictive visual conventions of mainstream superhero comics. She nevertheless criticized aspects of the website's technical presentation, particularly its dependence on Adobe Flash and difficulty linking directly to individual comics.

In December 2007, illustrator and arts writer Charley Parker praised Zuda's full-screen reading interface, which allowed readers to view high-resolution artwork without distracting navigation elements. Reviewing the initial lineup for Lines and Colors, Parker singled out Jeremy Love's Bayou for its storytelling, character development, and visual textures. He also praised the artwork of Steve Ellis on High Moon, particularly its draftsmanship, expressive linework, and use of color. Parker regarded the two series as compelling reasons to return to the platform and expressed optimism about Zuda's potential as a publishing model for original comics.

The imprint's original publications subsequently attracted favorable reviews beyond the webcomics community. In its May 2009 review of Bayou, Volume 1, Publishers Weekly praised Love's combination of historical fiction, Southern folklore, and fantasy, describing the work as "extremely beautiful, scary and wonderful." The review also commended Love's visual storytelling and Patrick Morgan's coloring.

Reviewing High Moon in October 2009, Robert Greenberger of ComicMix described it as one of Zuda's most consistent publications. He praised David Gallaher's dialogue and Ellis's ability to use the digital page format for dramatic composition, atmosphere, and action. Greenberger also praised the series' combination of Western, horror, and steampunk elements, although he noted that some aspects of its historical setting and supernatural mythology could have been better established.

Other Zuda titles also received positive critical attention. In an April 2010 review for Under the Radar, Jeremy Nisen praised Peter and Bobby Timony's The Night Owls for its humor, characterization, and gradual development of a larger narrative. Nisen credited Zuda with helping the series develop beyond its initial episodic format.

=== Community and creator development ===
Zuda's reader-voting system was also praised for providing opportunities for direct interaction between comics creators and their audiences. In August 2008, Christie St. Martin of the Los Angeles Times described Zuda as having developed a "strong and entertaining online community." She highlighted the opportunity for readers to participate in publishing decisions and encouraged audiences to discover new projects through the monthly competitions.

The platform also encouraged collaboration among participating creators. In April 2009, Publishers Weekly reported that The Hammer, a monthly competition winner, had been developed by four previously unsuccessful contestants from different countries who met through the Zuda community. DC executive Ron Perazza described the level of collaboration among participants as an unexpected development of the platform.

In the same article, Bayou creator Jeremy Love praised the accessibility of web publishing, its potential to introduce unconventional stories to larger audiences, and the opportunity to receive immediate feedback from readers. Love also identified the marketing, distribution, and financial support available through DC Comics as advantages of participating in Zuda.

=== Industry recognition ===
Zuda's publications received recognition from several comics-industry organizations. In 2009, High Moon, created by David Gallaher, Steve Ellis, and Scott O. Brown, won the Harvey Award for Best Online Comics Work. Jeremy Love's Bayou received five Glyph Comics Awards that year, including Story of the Year, Best Writer, and Best Artist.

Additional Zuda titles, including Supertron, The Night Owls, and The Black Cherry Bombshells, received Harvey Award nominations. Bayou was also nominated for an Eisner Award, and its first collected volume was selected for the American Library Association's 2010 Top Ten Great Graphic Novels for Teens.

=== Criticism ===
Despite favorable reviews of individual publications, Zuda's technological and contractual arrangements remained controversial. Some webcomics creators criticized the use of Adobe Flash, which complicated direct linking, sharing, and bookmarking individual pages. The display size of lettering and artwork also attracted criticism, although other reviewers praised the full-screen reading option.

Zuda's publishing agreements generated debate over intellectual-property ownership and creator compensation. Webcomics writer T Campbell praised the royalty provisions relative to other major publishers, while retailer and commentator Chris Butcher questioned the financial terms and rights arrangements.

The monthly competition structure also drew criticism. Some commentators questioned whether the initial selection of creators fulfilled Zuda's stated goal of discovering new talent, while later disputes concerned voting practices, aggressive promotion, and the inability of some well-received submissions to advance. These concerns contributed to DC's decision to discontinue the competition format in April 2010.

Writing for Wired following Zuda's closure in September 2010, Matt Kamen acknowledged the platform's achievements in original storytelling and audience participation. Kamen questioned the decision to terminate an initiative aimed at new digital readers at a time when the comics industry faced growing challenges from unauthorized online distribution.

== Closure ==
=== Closure and transition to DC Digital ===
In April 2010, Zuda suspended its monthly competitions following concerns about the voting process and contestant behavior. DC Comics executive Ron Perazza cited allegations of cheating, confusion over competition rules, aggressive promotion, and disputes among participants as problems with the format.

On July 1, 2010, DC announced the closure of the Zuda website and the transfer of selected titles to its broader digital distribution services. Publications including Bayou, High Moon, and The Night Owls had already received print editions, while additional material was made available through DC's digital application, ComiXology, and other platforms.

In September 2010, DC announced that it would discontinue publishing new material under the Zuda name as part of a larger corporate reorganization. DC co-publishers Jim Lee and Dan DiDio stated that material originally intended for Zuda would instead appear under the DC banner and that the company's digital initiatives would incorporate experience gained through the imprint.

=== Retrospective assessments ===
In a 2012 interview with The Beat, writer David Gallaher, whose series High Moon won Zuda's inaugural monthly competition, reflected on the advantages and limitations of digital-first publishing. Gallaher identified readership participation, audience measurement, community development, and the ability of digital comics to attract readers over time as advantages of the format.

Gallaher also discussed how digital presentation influenced creative decisions, citing the horizontal layout of High Moon and the importance of designing stories for their intended reading platforms. He described one of his principal lessons from Zuda as the importance of maintaining creator control over both the work and its production.

At the 2018 San Diego Comic Fest, former DC Comics creative director Richard Bruning discussed Zuda's development and business model. Bruning explained that the competition format had been intended to encourage community participation and distinguish the imprint in an increasingly crowded online environment. He compared its reader-voting approach to televised talent competitions, which were popular during the period.

Bruning attributed the imprint's financial difficulties partly to the costs of compensating creators while attracting insufficient advertising revenue. He stated that the development team had reservations about introducing advertising that might interfere with the reading experience. Despite the project's closure, Bruning regarded Zuda as an important creative accomplishment of his time at DC.

In September 2024, Gallaher published a retrospective titled "Zuda: Whatever Happened to the Comics of Tomorrow?" He characterized the imprint as an experiment in digital storytelling, creator development, and audience participation. Gallaher emphasized the monthly competitions, which allowed readers to influence publishing decisions, and the use of a 4:3 page format intended to accommodate computer-screen reading without requiring vertical scrolling.

Gallaher also highlighted the professional relationships established through the platform. He identified creators including Bobby Timony, Kevin Colden, Matthew Petz, Aaron Alexovich, and Drew Rausch as former Zuda participants with whom he subsequently collaborated. He attributed the imprint's closure partly to broader corporate restructuring at Warner Bros. and DC Comics, which he believed favored more established properties and publishing operations.

In an August 2025 essay, Gallaher again cited Zuda as an alternative approach to conventional comics publishing. He argued that its distinction lay in creator visibility, web-first distribution, and reader participation rather than attempting to replicate the business models of established superhero publishers.

In a September 2026 interview with The Comics Journal, Bruning offered a further assessment of Zuda's development and commercial performance. He discussed the technological limitations of digital-comics publishing during the late 2000s, particularly the reliance on Adobe Flash and the difficulty of adapting traditional comic-book layouts to computer and mobile screens.

Bruning also described the challenges of developing original material for digital consumption while retaining the possibility of conventional print publication. In his assessment, the imprint had difficulty attracting readers unfamiliar with its properties, and the technology and market for digital comics had not yet matured sufficiently to support its ambitions. He nevertheless expressed pride in the material Zuda published and its experimentation with new storytelling formats.

=== Legacy ===
Although Zuda operated for less than three years, several of its original publications continued to receive recognition and distribution after their initial online serialization.

High Moon, created by David Gallaher and Steve Ellis with letterer Scott O. Brown, won the 2009 Harvey Award for Best Online Comics Work. Jeremy Love's Bayou received five Glyph Comics Awards in 2009, and its first collected volume was selected for the American Library Association's 2010 Top Ten Great Graphic Novels for Teens.

In 2017, Papercutz announced plans to publish remastered editions of High Moon through its Super Genius imprint, including previously unpublished concluding material. The announcement represented a continuation of a property that had originated through Zuda's inaugural competition.

Retrospective accounts have emphasized different aspects of Zuda's significance. Gallaher has characterized its lasting contribution primarily in terms of creator opportunity, experimentation, and the professional communities it fostered. He has compared its audience-participation model with later webcomics platforms, including WEBTOON and Tapas.

Bruning, by contrast, has emphasized Zuda's attempts to solve technological and commercial problems associated with digital publishing, including screen presentation, original-content development, audience discovery, and the relationship between digital and print formats. Both participants have described the imprint as an experimental undertaking whose creative accomplishments outlasted its original publishing operation.

== Awards and recognition ==
Several titles published through Zuda Comics received awards and nominations from the Harvey Awards, Glyph Comics Awards, and other organizations.

In 2009, Jeremy Love's Bayou won five Glyph Comics Awards, including Story of the Year, Best Writer, Best Artist, Best Female Character, and Best Comic Strip.

That same year, High Moon, created by David Gallaher, Steve Ellis, and Scott O. Brown, won the Harvey Award for Best Online Comics Work. Three Zuda titles, High Moon, The Night Owls, and Supertron, were also nominated for Best New Series.

The Night Owls, created by Peter and Bobby Timony, received three Harvey Award nominations in 2009, including Best New Series, Best Online Comics Work, and Best New Talent for Bobby Timony. In 2010, the series' character Mindy Markus was nominated for the Lulu Award for Best Female Character. The Night Owls, Volume 1 was also selected as a finalist in the Young Adult Graphic Novels category of the Cybils Awards.

In 2010, Bayou, Volume 1 was selected by the American Library Association for its Top Ten Great Graphic Novels for Teens list.

Year	Award	Category	Work or recipient	Result
2009	Glyph Comics Award	Story of the Year	Bayou — Jeremy Love	Won
2009	Glyph Comics Award	Best Writer	Jeremy Love — Bayou	Won
2009	Glyph Comics Award	Best Artist	Jeremy Love — Bayou	Won
2009	Glyph Comics Award	Best Female Character	Lee Wagstaff — Bayou	Won
2009	Glyph Comics Award	Best Comic Strip	Bayou — Jeremy Love	Won
2009	Harvey Award	Best Online Comics Work	High Moon — David Gallaher, Steve Ellis, and Scott O. Brown	Won
2009	Harvey Award	Best New Series	High Moon	Nominated
2009	Harvey Award	Best New Series	The Night Owls	Nominated
2009	Harvey Award	Best New Series	Supertron	Nominated
2009	Harvey Award	Best Online Comics Work	The Night Owls — Bobby and Peter Timony	Nominated
2009	Harvey Award	Best Online Comics Work	The Black Cherry Bombshells — Tony Trov and Johnny Zito	Nominated
2009	Harvey Award	Best New Talent	Bobby Timony — The Night Owls	Nominated
2010	Harvey Award	Best Online Comics Work	High Moon — David Gallaher, Steve Ellis, and Scott O. Brown	Nominated
2010	Harvey Award	Best Inker	Steve Ellis — High Moon	Nominated
2010	Lulu Award	Best Female Character	Mindy Markus — The Night Owls, by Peter and Bobby Timony	Nominated
2010	Cybils Award	Graphic Novels — Young Adult	The Night Owls, Volume 1 — Peter and Bobby Timony	Finalist
2010	American Library Association	Top Ten Great Graphic Novels for Teens	Bayou, Volume 1 — Jeremy Love	Selected
