= Geekadelphia =

Website

- Available in: English
- Owner: Analog Boys
- Creators: Tim Quirino; Eric Smith
- Commercial: Yes
- Launched: 2007
- Current status: Active

Geekadelphia was a Philadelphia-based weblog focused on entertainment, science, technology and other related areas pertaining to the city of Philadelphia. Founded in 2007, the blog also co-hosted the Philadelphia Geek Awards with the Academy of Natural Sciences of Drexel University. The site ceased operation in November 2017, and it is no longer online.

== History ==
Geekadelphia was founded by Tim Quirino and Eric Smith in 2007, who, according to Smith, "wanted a place to ramble about things that interested us and have a site to host whatever silly videos we'd make." Its first post was published on November 29, 2007. In its early days, revenue earned from Geekadelphia was only enough to pay for hosting. Events on behalf of the site were created, along with a podcast with Benjamin Gilbert and a webcomic. In 2013, Geekadelphia was rebranded and incorporated in the company Analog Boys. Quirino left for San Francisco in 2014 to work as a designer for Facebook. On November 30, 2017, the site posted a blog titled 'You're Still Here? Go Home' explaining how the site has come to an end.

== Events ==
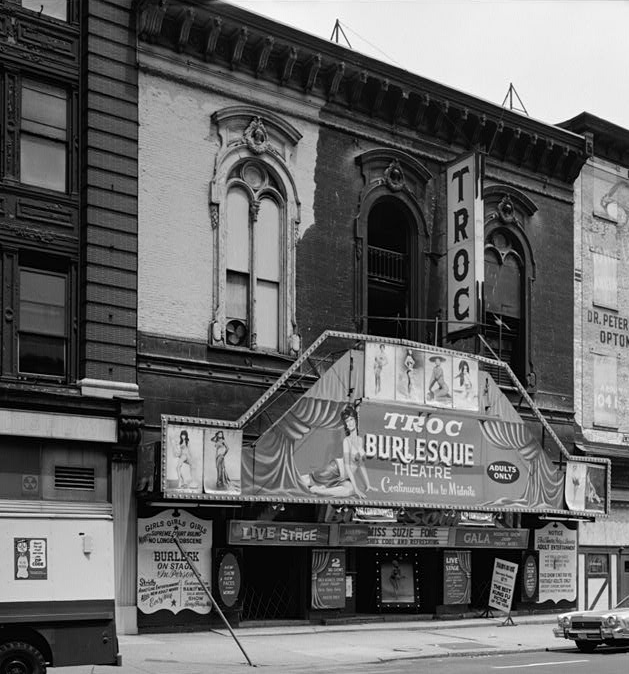
The site's staff decorated the Trocadero Theatre, pictured in 1973, for the screenings of Jennifer's Body and Zombieland.

In 2008, Geekadelphia hosted a Battlestar Galactica-themed party in Old City with The Hacktory, a Philadelphia-based organization promoting the application of technology in the arts, and Indy Hall. The site's staff decorated the Trocadero Theatre for the screenings of Jennifer's Body in 2009 and Zombieland in 2010.

=== Philadelphia Geek Awards ===
In 2011, Geekadelphia launched the Philadelphia Geek Awards, in conjunction with the Academy of Natural Sciences of Drexel University, to honor and celebrate achievements within the Philadelphia community. Its second annual ceremony, hosted at the university, was reported to have sold over 400 in a few minutes. During its third-annual ceremony, Smith stated his criteria for geek as "more about having a hobby or a side project that you feel really passionate about, that you care so much about that you pour yourself into it." The organizers "retired" the Awards as of August 2018, citing "it was a struggle to keep the event funded well enough to operate".

== links ==
- Geekadelphia Blog (archived link by WebArchive, January 2019)
