= High Moon =

Webcomic series

- Matthew Macgregor in the cover to High Moon, art by Steve Ellis

Publication information
- Publisher: Zuda imprint of DC Comics; Super Genius imprint of Papercutz
- Format: Ongoing webcomic series
- Publication date: 2007–2010; 2017
- Main character: Matthew Macgregor

Creative team
- Created by: David Gallaher; Steve Ellis
- Written by: David Gallaher
- Artist: Steve Ellis

High Moon is a horror Western webcomic series created by writer David Gallaher and artist Steve Ellis. Combining Western adventure with werewolves, supernatural mysteries, and steampunk elements, it debuted in October 2007 as part of Zuda Comics, DC Comics' webcomics imprint. It won Zuda's inaugural reader competition and continued serialization until the imprint closed in 2010. The series won the 2009 Harvey Award for Best Online Comics Work.

Beginning in 2017, Papercutz's Super Genius imprint republished the series in a planned three-volume edition, with the final volume featuring previously unpublished material.

== Publication history ==
Gallaher began developing High Moon in 2004. The series was among the initial submissions featured when Zuda Comics launched in October 2007. After winning the platform's first reader competition, Gallaher and Ellis received a contract to continue the comic as an ongoing series. Scott O. Brown served as its letterer and production artist.

DC Comics published the first collected edition in 2009. Presented in a landscape format reflecting the original webcomic's layout, the volume collected its first three story arcs. Serialization ended following Zuda's closure in 2010.

In 2017, Papercutz announced a new edition through its Super Genius imprint. The publication plan included two volumes of remastered material followed by a third volume concluding the story with new material.

== Synopsis ==
The opening story follows Matthew Macgregor, a former Pinkerton detective and bounty hunter investigating strange events in Blest, Texas. Already suffering from drought and famine, the town is threatened by supernatural creatures. As Macgregor investigates, he attempts to conceal his own connection to witchcraft and the supernatural.

After Matthew's death, Eddie Conroy, an African-American outlaw afflicted with lycanthropy, assumes the dead hunter's identity. In Ragged Rock, Oklahoma, a train robbery and a string of grisly murders entangle him in a family vendetta, while the arrival of Matthew's brother, Tristan Macgregor, complicates his assumed identity. His journey continues into the Black Hills of South Dakota, where Young Raven seeks his help against cavalry forces threatening her people. By spring 1891, the mystery of a bottle marked with an unfamiliar symbol draws Conroy across the Atlantic to London, where he searches for the organization behind it.

== Main Characters ==
- Matthew Macgregor: A retired Pinkerton detective and bounty hunter who investigates supernatural threats while concealing his own past steeped in witchcraft.
- Eddie Conroy: An African-American outlaw afflicted with lycanthropy who assumes Matthew Macgregor's identity after his death, placing a werewolf in the role of a monster hunter.
- Tristan Macgregor: Matthew's brother, whose arrival complicates Conroy's assumed identity. Concealing his face behind goggles, he hunts supernatural creatures with a mechanical arm and steampunk weapons invented by Nikola Tesla.
- Red: Conroy's loyal wolfdog companion, accompanying him through his encounters with outlaws, monster hunters, and supernatural creatures.

== Awards ==
Year	Award	Category	Result
2009	Harvey Awards	Best New Series	Nominated
2009	Harvey Awards	Best Online Comics Work	Won
2010	Harvey Awards	Best Online Comics Work	Nominated

== Reception ==
Publishers Weekly praised High Moon for its intricate storytelling, combination of mythological traditions, and atmospheric artwork. Booklist compared its blend of genres to Sergio Leone's Westerns and monster films, highlighting Ellis's use of color. The Washington Post also praised the artwork's palette and described the comic as engaging. A starred review in Library Journal praised its plot twists, treatment of race relations in postslavery America, and combination of Western adventure with steampunk elements.

Reviewing the first collected volume for ComicMix, Robert Greenberger praised Gallaher's distinctive dialogue, Ellis's page layouts, and the atmospheric use of color. He found the series entertaining, although he felt that its historical setting and supernatural rules needed further explanation. Rod Lott of the Oklahoma Gazette praised the stories' unpredictability and progression, along with Ellis's rich color palette, but found some sequences difficult to follow, attributing this to both the scripting and visual storytelling.

Reviewing the 2017 edition, High Moon: Bullet Holes and Bite Marks, Lizzy Walker of Monster Librarian recommended the book, praising its combination of Western and horror elements and the way Ellis's artwork complemented Gallaher's story.

WatchMojo ranked High Moon second on its list of "Top 10 Astonishing Fantasy Webcomics to Check Out", praising its combination of supernatural fantasy and Western themes, complex characters, and artwork.
