= Red 5 Comics =

Canadian comic book publishing company

- Founded: 2007
- Founders: Scott Chitwood, Paul Ens
- Distribution: Simon & Schuster
- Key people: Paul Ens, Scott Chitwood, Dave Zeibart, Joshua Starnes
- Publication types: Comics
- Official website: Red5Comics.com

Red 5 is an independent comic book publisher, known for producing a combination of creator-owned and internally developed titles, including their best known title, Atomic Robo. Red 5 was one of the first comics publishers to jump into digital distribution.

== Titles ==
- 7 Percent
- Abyss
- Afterburn
- Atomic Robo
- Bad Dreams
- Beautiful Creatures
- Bodie Troll
- Bonnie Lass
- Box 13 (in partnership with Comixology)
- Dragon Whisperer
- Drone
- Enigmatown
- Haunted
- Legacy of Mandrake the Magician
- Machine Girl
- Midknight
- Moon Girl
- Neozoic
- Riptide
- Spook
- We Kill Monsters
- ZMD: Zombies of Mass Destruction

== Former titles ==
- Atomic Robo
- Foster Broussard: Demons of the Gold Rush
- Midknight
- Bodie Troll

== Awards ==
- 2007 Gem Award won (Best New Publisher)
- 2008 Shuster Award nomination (Best Canadian Publisher)
- 2008 Eisner Award nomination (Best Limited Series) for Atomic Robo
- 2008 Eisner Award nomination (Best Colorist) for Ronda Pattison on Atomic Robo
- 2009 Shuster Award nomination (Best Canadian Publisher)
