= Marvel CyberComics =

Comic series made by Marvel

CyberComics logo

Marvel CyberComics was a digital-comics initiative produced by Marvel Comics and Marvel Interactive from 1996 to 2000. Originally distributed through America Online (AOL) and later through Marvel's websites, the series presented original stories featuring characters including Spider-Man, Wolverine, Captain America, Iron Man, and the X-Men.

Developed using Macromedia Director and Shockwave, the comics combined traditional sequential artwork with limited animation, sound effects, music, and reader-controlled transitions between panels. Unlike conventional printed comic books, CyberComics were created specifically for computer-based presentation.

CyberComics represented an early experiment in original digital storytelling by a major American comic-book publisher. Its production team combined traditional comic-book illustration with emerging multimedia technology, while several contributors subsequently participated in other digital publishing initiatives, including Zuda Comics. Following the discontinuation of CyberComics in 2000, the disappearance of many original interactive editions prompted later discussions about the preservation of early digital comics.

== History ==
=== Origins and AOL distribution (1996–1997) ===
Marvel CyberComics originated in the summer of 1996 as part of a partnership between Marvel Comics and America Online. The initiative was developed during a period when comic-book publishers were experimenting with emerging forms of digital entertainment and seeking new audiences through computer networks.

In July 1996, the Los Angeles Times reported that Marvel had reached an agreement with AOL to distribute an interactive Spider-Man comic as part of the company's expansion into electronic media.

The first CyberComics featured Spider-Man and Wolverine. Rather than reproducing existing printed pages as static images, the stories employed interactive panel transitions, animation, and audio to create a hybrid of comic books and animated entertainment.

The original comics appeared through AOL's Marvel-related online services. In 1997, Marvel expanded their availability through its own online presence, including MarvelZone.com.

=== Marvel Zone and expansion (1998–1999) ===
In February 1998, Marvel Interactive announced plans to expand its online offerings through Marvel Zone, a subscription-based service combining CyberComics, games, fan fiction, trivia, and other interactive entertainment.

The service was available without an additional charge to AOL subscribers, while other users could subscribe for $3.95 per month. Marvel Interactive senior vice president Paul Kallis described online publishing as an opportunity to introduce Marvel characters to new readers while maintaining connections to traditional comic-book publishing.

The original digital stories were produced by Marvel writers and artists and were subject to the continuity requirements of the company's established fictional universe.

Marvel Zone also included material associated with Stan Lee, while John Cerilli served as an editorial manager involved in the development of Marvel's online comics and interactive programming.

=== NextPlanetOver partnership (1999) ===
In September 1999, Marvel entered into a one-year licensing and marketing agreement with NextPlanetOver.com, an online retailer specializing in comics, games, and related merchandise.

The agreement included the distribution of twelve previously produced CyberComics and the publication of additional material on a monthly basis. The partnership represented another attempt to develop a commercial distribution model for Marvel's original digital comics.

The partnership occurred during a period of experimentation with online retail, advertising, and digital entertainment distribution. Although CyberComics had initially appeared as weekly releases, the later arrangement emphasized monthly publication.

=== Discontinuation and later digital services ===
Production of new Marvel CyberComics ended in 2000. The original interactive stories were subsequently removed from Marvel's websites.

Comics scholar Darren Wershler identified the labor-intensive production requirements and changing economics of digital distribution as factors in Marvel's transition toward other forms of online comics publishing.

Following CyberComics, Marvel experimented with DotComics, which primarily presented digital versions of existing print material rather than producing similarly elaborate interactive stories.

In November 2007, Marvel launched Marvel Digital Comics Unlimited, a subscription-based archive initially offering approximately 2,500 comic-book issues. Unlike CyberComics, the service concentrated on making existing publications available through a digital reader.

== Format and production ==
=== Interactive storytelling ===
Marvel CyberComics used a hybrid format combining the visual conventions of printed comics with limited motion and audio.

The stories were developed using Macromedia Director, an authoring application capable of producing interactive multimedia projects for the Shockwave platform.

Readers advanced through stories by clicking to reveal dialogue, change images, activate transitions, or move between panels. Individual frames could contain multiple comic panels, with their contents changing or animating as the reader progressed.

Animation, sound effects, and music were used to support the storytelling, while maintaining the visual structure and sequential pacing of traditional comics.

Contemporary reporting by Wired described the stories as retaining the panel-based format of comic books while incorporating sound loops and effects activated through reader interaction.

=== Artwork and sound design ===
Production involved converting traditional comics artwork into digital material suitable for interactive presentation.

Artists and technical staff collaborated on coloring, image preparation, animation, programming, and audio integration.

Garry Schafer, working through his multimedia practice Grimmwerks, contributed sound design, programming, animation, and audio production to Marvel's online comics. Schafer has described producing soundscapes for CyberComics and contributing to Marvel's related interactive projects.

The combination of comic-book illustration and interactive technology distinguished CyberComics from traditional print adaptations and established an early example of the multimedia techniques later associated with motion comics.

=== Creative contributors ===
Marvel CyberComics featured original stories by writers and artists associated with Marvel's print publications. The initiative brought established comic-book creators into a digital format that combined sequential artwork with interactive multimedia elements.

Writer D. G. Chichester, known for his work on Marvel's Daredevil, contributed several CyberComics, including stories featuring Spider-Man. Comics scholar Darren Wershler identified Chichester as one of the recurring writers involved in the initiative.

Other contributing writers included Tom DeFalco, Kevin Smith, Larry Hama, Fabian Nicieza, and Joe Kelly. Artists associated with individual CyberComics included Dærick Gröss Sr., Joe Quesada, Jimmy Palmiotti, and Casey Jones.

These contributors created original digital stories featuring characters from Marvel's established publishing line, sometimes connecting the online material to contemporary print comics. One example was Gambit: The Hunt for the Tomorrow Stone, written by Nicieza and illustrated by Gröss, which was referenced in the printed Gambit #12.

=== Staff and production ===
Marvel CyberComics was developed by a multidisciplinary production team within Marvel Interactive, bringing together editorial staff, art directors, designers, programmers, animators, and digital production specialists.

Paul Kallis, senior vice president of Marvel Interactive, oversaw the company's expansion into online entertainment. John Cerilli served as an editorial manager involved in developing Marvel's digital comics and related interactive programming.

Art director Michael Redding supervised Marvel's weekly AOL CyberComics, coordinating a geographically distributed team of illustrators, colorists, designers, programmers, and animators. His responsibilities included maintaining production schedules and overseeing artwork and digital development for Marvel's online publications.

David Gallaher joined Marvel Interactive as an intern during the late 1990s, contributing to digital comics production, including scanning, copyediting, and preparation of material for the company's online publications. In a September 2024 retrospective, Gallaher discussed his experiences working on CyberComics and the related Excelsior Theatre project. Comics commentator Sean Kleefeld subsequently documented Gallaher's firsthand recollections of Marvel's early digital publishing efforts.

Other personnel associated with Marvel Interactive during this period included Gregg Sanderson, Tracy Kubert, Frank Tieri, Ron Perazza, Dave McCullough, and Kwanza Johnson. Gallaher identified Sanderson, Kubert, and Tieri among his early mentors at Marvel. In a December 2007 interview, he recalled working alongside Perazza, McCullough, and Johnson at Marvel Interactive before their subsequent involvement in DC Comics' digital publishing initiative, Zuda Comics.

== Selected CyberComics ==
CyberComics featured original stories involving established Marvel superheroes, occasionally connecting to contemporary print publications and other media.

=== Superheroes ===
- Blade (1998), a digital comic associated with the release of the film Blade.
- Captain America/Iron Man: Invasion Force, featuring Captain America and Iron Man.
- Daredevil: Protection Racket (1998), featuring Daredevil, Kingpin, and Bullseye.
- Daredevil #0: What a Life (1998), written by Kevin Smith, with artwork by Joe Quesada and Jimmy Palmiotti. The digital story served as a prelude to Marvel Knights' Daredevil relaunch.
- Deadpool: Ride My Hard Drive, Baby! (2000), written by Joe Kelly, featuring Deadpool in a computer-themed adventure.
- Heroes Return (1997), associated with Marvel's Heroes Reborn and Heroes Return publishing initiatives.
- Marvel Milk Maniacs: Race for Destruction (2000), a promotional digital comic featuring Captain America, Spider-Man, and the Hulk.
- Nick Fury/Black Widow: Jungle Warfare, featuring Nick Fury and Black Widow.
- Spider-Man: Doom Control (1998), written by D. G. Chichester with artwork by Dærick Gröss Sr., featuring Spider-Man and Doctor Doom.

=== Mutants ===
- Gambit: The Hunt for the Tomorrow Stone (1999), written by Fabian Nicieza, with artwork by Dærick Gröss Sr. The story featured Gambit assisting Spat in her search for an artifact capable of reversing her accelerated de-aging. The CyberComic was subsequently referenced in Gambit #12, establishing a connection between the digital story and Marvel's ongoing print continuity.
- Wolverine: Merciless Is the Mongrel (1996), written by Tom DeFalco, with artwork by Dærick Gröss Sr.
- X-Men: Twisted History (2000), written by D. G. Chichester, with artwork by Dærick Gröss Sr.
- X-Men: The Ravages of Apocalypse (1996), written by Larry Hama and illustrated by Dærick Gröss Sr., associated with the video game of the same name.

== Marvel Messenger Comics ==
Toward the end of the CyberComics initiative, Marvel experimented with a different form of digital comics distribution through its emailed Marvel Messenger newsletter.

Unlike the animated CyberComics, the newsletter presented original, static comic-book pages distributed in PDF format. These stories were serialized across successive installments of the newsletter and served as promotional material for Marvel's print publications.

Writer Joe Kelly and artist Walter McDaniel produced two serialized stories, The Quest for the Eleventh Ring, featuring the Fantastic Four and the Mandarin, and Grim Temptation, featuring the Thing and Doctor Doom. The former ran for twelve installments and the latter for fifteen. Comics commentator Sean Kleefeld subsequently collected the surviving installments into PDF files and documented their publication history.

The newsletter comics were discontinued in 2000, around the same time as the original CyberComics initiative.

== Marvel's Excelsior Theatre ==
During the late 1990s, Marvel Interactive developed Marvel's Excelsior Theatre, an online multimedia initiative combining comic-book artwork, animation, recorded dialogue, music, and sound effects. Produced alongside Marvel's weekly CyberComics, the project adopted a monthly serial format inspired by classic radio dramas, movie serials, and Orson Welles' The Mercury Theatre on the Air.

=== The Secret Adventures of Captain America ===
The Secret Adventures of Captain America was an animated adventure serial developed by Marvel Interactive around 1998. The series was written by James Felder, Ben Raab, and Joe Kelly, with artwork by John Cassaday and Pete Woods. Editorial development was supervised by John Cerilli and Peter Kelley.

Music and sound effects were produced by Garry Schafer of Grimmwerks, who also voiced Captain America. Stan Lee served as narrator, while additional performances were provided by members of the writing and production staff, including Cerilli and Greg Fitzsimmons. Animation was credited to Pete Dolan.

The project marked Cassaday's first assignment for Marvel Comics. In a September 2024 tribute published by Marvel following the artist's death, Cerilli recalled commissioning Cassaday to develop the artwork and character designs for the Captain America production. Cerilli credited the project with introducing Cassaday's work to Marvel, preceding his later contributions to titles including Captain America and Astonishing X-Men.

Writer David Gallaher, who participated in the production as a Marvel Interactive intern, later described the project as an early experiment in collaborative digital storytelling. In a 2024 retrospective, Gallaher recalled working with the creative team to adapt traditional comic-book artwork into animated multimedia presentations. According to Gallaher, the series was discontinued after five episodes.

=== Production techniques ===
The Secret Adventures of Captain America was produced using early versions of Macromedia Flash. Gallaher recalled working with Flash 3, while Schafer identified Flash 3 and Flash 4 as the technologies used during the project's development. The team experimented with digital coloring, limited animation, and audio compression to accommodate the technical restrictions of contemporary internet connections.

Schafer described recording dialogue at Marvel's New York offices using digital audio tape equipment. Writers, editors, and other contributors performed character voices, with individual parts recorded separately. Schafer subsequently digitized the performances and assembled the dialogue using Opcode Vision audio software.

The assembled recordings were delivered to the animators, who synchronized their sequences to the dialogue. Once the animation was completed, Schafer integrated the music, sound effects, and final vocal performances into the Flash presentations, adjusting the timing to match the finished visuals.

Both Schafer and Gallaher later recalled the difficulties of adapting Cassaday's detailed illustrations to the limitations of early web animation. Their accounts document a production process in which traditional comic-book artists, writers, editors, animators, and audio specialists collaborated on a format distinct from Marvel's conventional print publications.

== Influence on Zuda Comics ==
Several former Marvel Interactive collaborators later participated in the development of Zuda Comics, a digital-first webcomics imprint launched by DC Comics in 2007. In a December 2007 interview with Comics Worth Reading, writer David Gallaher recalled working alongside Ron Perazza, Dave McCullough, and Kwanza Johnson during his tenure at Marvel Interactive.

At Zuda, Perazza directed the imprint's day-to-day creative operations, Johnson oversaw editorial selection, and McCullough managed its technology, under the supervision of DC creative director Richard Bruning.

Gallaher participated as a comics creator rather than an employee of the imprint. He recalled submitting three proposals to Zuda, with Johnson selecting High Moon, a supernatural Western developed with artist Steve Ellis and letterer Scott O. Brown. The series subsequently won Zuda's inaugural reader competition in November 2007.

In a 2012 interview with The Beat, Gallaher reflected on the influence of his early Marvel Interactive experience on his subsequent work in digital comics, including High Moon and the mobile-first series Box 13.

== Digital Preservation ==
The discontinuation of Marvel CyberComics in 2000 created challenges for preserving the original interactive publications. Many of the stories became inaccessible following their removal from Marvel's websites, and surviving copies were not consistently maintained in publicly accessible archives.

In a June 2011 retrospective, comics historian Sean Kleefeld discussed the disappearance of the original CyberComics and the difficulties of preserving material created with obsolete multimedia technologies. Kleefeld also noted that the comics were expensive to produce relative to conventional print material and that Marvel had not established a commercially sustainable model for the format.

One particularly notable example was Gambit: The Hunt for the Tomorrow Stone, a 1999 digital-exclusive story referenced in the printed Gambit #12. In May 2016, journalist Rich Johnston investigated the disappearance of the CyberComic and contacted its original creative team. Writer Fabian Nicieza confirmed his authorship but was uncertain whether he still possessed the original script, while artist Dærick Gröss Sr. retained examples of the original black-and-white artwork.

In September 2024, former Marvel Interactive contributor David Gallaher published a retrospective discussing his involvement with CyberComics and the disappearance of the original digital material. Gallaher recalled that former Marvel editor John Cerilli had suggested surviving copies might remain in private or institutional archives.

Responding to Gallaher's essay, Kleefeld compared the preservation problems surrounding CyberComics with the historical loss of original comics artwork. He observed that the lack of a viable commercial model for the digital publications had contributed to their uncertain archival status.

Although some original artwork, digital files, video recordings, and related materials have survived, the preservation of the original interactive editions remains incomplete.

== See also ==
- Marvel Unlimited
- Digital comic
- Motion comic
- Webcomic
- Zuda Comics
