= Marvel Unlimited =

Webcomics hosting service

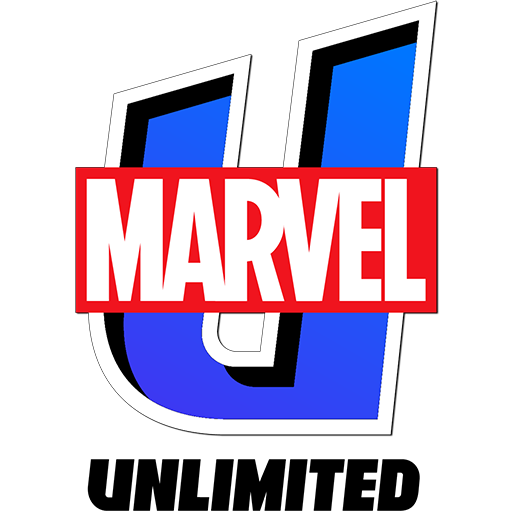
- Final logo, used from 2021-2026
- Former name: Marvel Digital Comics Unlimited
- Website type: Digital comics subscription service
- Available in: Multilingual
- Dissolved: December 7, 2026; 15 days' time
- Predecessors: Marvel CyberComics (1996–2000); DotComics (2000–2004); Marvel Digital Comics (2004–2013)
- Successor: Marvel Comics
- Country of origin: United States
- Area served: Worldwide
- Owner: The Walt Disney Company
- Creator: Marvel Comics
- Services: Online comic books via Web, iOS, and Android
- Parent: Marvel Entertainment (2007–2023); Marvel Comics (2023–2026)
- Website: www.marvel.com/comics/unlimited
- Commercial: Yes
- Registration: Yes; Monthly or annual subscription required to access content
- Launched: November 13, 2007; 19 years ago
- Current status: Active

Marvel Unlimited (formerly known as Marvel Digital Comics Unlimited) is an American online service owned by Marvel Comics that distributes their comic books via the internet. The service launched on November 13, 2007, and now has more than 30,000 comic book issues in its archive. It is available through the Web, iOS, and Android. On October 5, 2026, Marvel announced Marvel Comics, a successor app and service developed and operated by WEBTOON, with plans to sunset Marvel Unlimited on December 7, 2026.

== History ==
=== Marvel Unlimited ===
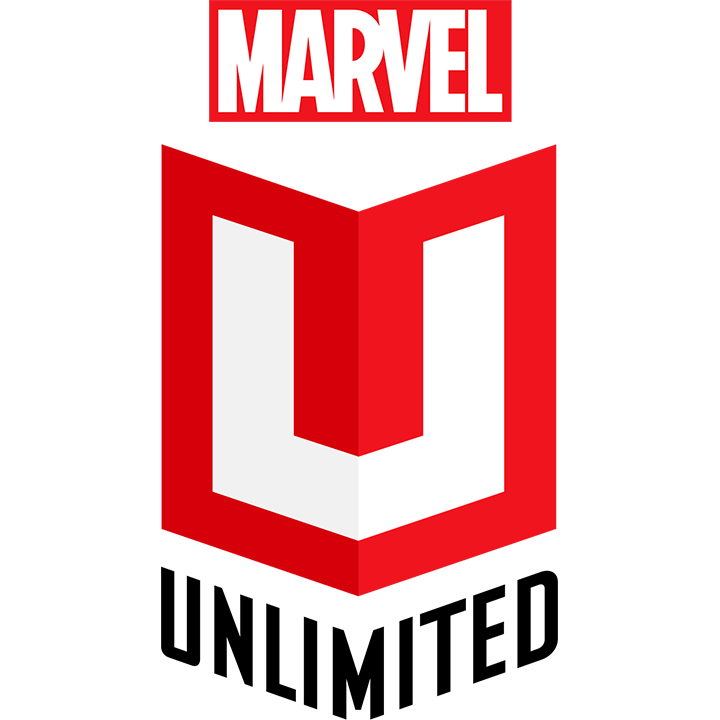
Logo used from 2007-2021

Marvel began releasing comics over the internet in 1996 with Marvel CyberComics. This was later replaced by DotComics under the tenure of Bill Jemas. This would grow to a size of dozens of comics by 2002. However, it would later be limited to a mere twelve comics by 2004.

Marvel Digital Comics was announced in 2005 as a replacement to its DotComics. However, it utilized the same Flash-based interface with only minor updates, while decreasing the comics available from twelve issues to four issues. At this time, Editor-in-chief Joe Quesada speculated on the possibilities of adding animation to the comics, which would be realized in 2009 with the release of Spider-Woman as a motion comic.

Digital Comics only grew modestly and reached over twenty-four comics in April 2006, until finally it relaunched in November 2007 as Marvel Digital Comics Unlimited. Unlike earlier initiatives, Marvel Digital Comics Unlimited was a subscription service with over 2,500 comics available to subscribers, with new comics added on a weekly basis. A small portion of the library was made available for free in an attempt to entice viewers to subscribe to the service through either its monthly or yearly plans.

In response to fears from comic sellers, Dan Buckley promised that there would be at least a six-month delay from when a comic is published in print and when it is made available on Marvel's Digital Comics Unlimited. However Marvel Comics modified this policy in 2008 with the release of Secret Invasion: Home Invasion. This was released online first as a tie-in with the Secret Invasion event. Digital comic exclusives would be broadened to include non-event comics. The initial release of exclusives included a Fin Fang Four story by Scott Gray and Roger Langridge, Marvels Channel: Monsters, Myths and Marvels by Frank Tieri and Juan Santacruz, American Eagle: Just a Little Old-Fashioned Justice by Jason Aaron and Kid Colt by Tom DeFalco.

On October 13, 2009, Marvel launched an upgraded version of the comic viewer, dubbed the Marvel Digital Comics Unlimited Reader 3.0. The new digital comics reader added a number of new features including full screen mode, thumbnails for all pages, and easier ways of finding books related to the one being read.

It then published a daily series of "lost" Captain America comic strips that were actually modern creations written by Karl Kesel. A three-part Galacta story was also published digitally following it winning the vote to see which was the most popular story in Marvel Assistant-Sized Spectacular.

In March 2013, Marvel announced that the service would be renamed from Marvel Digital Comics Unlimited to Marvel Unlimited, and that the service would expand to iOS devices.

On October 19, 2020, Marvel announced the six-month release delay would be shortened to only three months with over 28,000 Marvel comics available on the service.

In September 2021, the Marvel Unlimited app was redesigned and featured more than 29,000 comic books.

In July 2022, Marvel announced that more than 30,000 comics were made available to read on Marvel Unlimited.

On October 5, 2026, Marvel announced Marvel Comics, a successor app and service developed and operated by WEBTOON. The new service is set to launch on November 16, 2026, with Marvel Unlimited being sunset shortly after on December 7, 2026. The new service will also include titles from Disney's other brands like Star Wars, 20th Century Studios, Pixar and Disney Animation in addition to Marvel.

=== Infinity Comics ===
On September 9, 2021, Marvel Comics introduced the Infinity Comics brand, which are digital comics exclusive to Marvel Unlimited. These comics release weekly and differ from the standard page turn by using a vertical scroll to advance reading. Marvel's Infinity Comics launched with 27 series exclusive to the service. Over 100 issues were planned by the end of 2021.

In September 2022, Marvel announced that within one year "the Infinity Comics lineup has grown to over 350 issues."

On June 15, 2023, VP of Marketing for Marvel Digital Media Jessica Malloy said, "Our strategy with Marvel's Infinity Comics (our version of webtoons) is to bring fans an immersive way to experience Marvel stories in a vertical format that works on all types of devices, but optimized for phones. The Infinity Comics format allows our creators to innovate with storytelling in continuity and outside of it. We’re not locking into one type of genre or character set, rather experimenting to understand what resonates the best. With this strategy we aim to provide something for everyone to enjoy."

== Reception ==
=== Critical response ===
==== Marvel Unlimited ====
Gerald Lynch of TechRadar gave Marvel Unlimited a grade of four out of five stars, writing, "Marvel Unlimited is an excellent way to access tens of thousands of comics on multiple devices, providing you’re not too interested in the latest issues and can put up with some UI quirks." Rosie Knight of Nerdist included Marvel Unlimited in their "6 Super Cool Apps for Reading Comics" list, saying, "If you’re a completist and adore the tales that get told under the banner of the Marvel Universe, then you might just find yourself falling for this one." Dana Forsythe of Paste included Marvel Unlimited in their "Top 15 Digital Comic Book Services" list.

Zachary McAuliffe of CNET included Marvel Unlimited in their "Best Ways to Read Digital Comics in 2023" list and called it one of the "best subscriptions and apps for digital comics." John-Michael Bond of The Daily Dot ranked Marvel Unlimited first in their ranking of the "best subscription services" to read "comics online." Craig Grannell of Stuff ranked Marvel Unlimited second in their "Six of the Best Comic Reader Apps" list and described it as "the Netflix of comics."

==== Literary reception of Infinity Comics ====
Nicholas Brooks of Comic Book Resources stated, "These new Infinity Comics allow fans to take a breather from the world-breaking stakes of superhero comics and enjoy a bit of good old-fashioned humor." Kevin Lainez of Comic Book Revolution said, "The Infinity Comic line is in a great place to be an even bigger success in its second year. As the world is moving quicker and quicker into a digital future for entertainment Marvel Unlimited is a valuable service. Having the Infinity Comics is an opportunity to tell all types of stories for all of Marvel’s readership as the first year of the line showed. Combine that with bringing in more creative teams to tell stories with Marvel's iconic characters there is unlimited opportunity for Marvel to explore other ways to tell comic book stories."

Alex Schlesinger of Screen Rant asserted, "The popular scrolling Marvel Unlimited Infinity Comics from Marvel Comics have been a fun and exciting way to engage new readers, but recent arcs in Marvel's Voices Infinity Comic and X-Men Unlimited Infinity Comic have proven that they are a great venue for bringing back deep cut, fan-favorite characters, making the digital-only comics a delight for established readers as well." Rebecca Kaplan of Popverse wrote, "What’s most enjoyable about Marvel’s one-shot vertical format comics is that it condenses decades' worth of character history and continuity into an easy-to-read second-person story that directs new readers to the essential issues for a particular MCU hero."

=== Userbase ===
In May 2020, Marvel announced that a selection of comic books including Avengers vs. X-Men, The Dark Phoenix Saga, and Civil War was read more than two million times during the month of March. In January 2021, it was revealed that more than 18.7 million comics have been read through 2020.

In July 2022, Bloomberg reported, "Infinity Comics titles break into the top 10 of most read issues on Marvel Unlimited, which has over 30,000 comics, on a daily basis," and that C.B. Cebulski, editor in chief of Marvel Comics, "says that Infinity Comics help broaden Marvel’s audience to a generation that consumes everything on screens."

In October 2022, the number of Marvel Unlimited subscribers had grown by 30% compared to 2021 with more than 300 titles being read over two million times. In 2023, Marvel Unlimited had been downloaded more than five million times on Google Play.

In October 2023, Marvel revealed that the Infinity Comics brand gained over five million comics read since its launch.

=== Accolades ===
Year	Award	Category	Nominee(s) and recipients	Result	Ref.
2016	Webby Awards	Entertainment (Mobile Sites & Apps)	Marvel Unlimited	Won	
2019	Webby Awards	Best Apps, Mobile, and Voice – Entertainment	Marvel Unlimited	Won	
2020	Webby Awards	Best Apps, Mobile, and Voice – Entertainment	Marvel Unlimited	Nominated	
2022	Eisner Awards	Best Digital Comic	It's Jeff!	Nominated	
2022	Webby Awards	Apps and Software – Apps Entertainment	Marvel Unlimited	Nominated	

== Other Marvel digital comics outlets ==
In addition to its Marvel Unlimited app, Marvel began releasing digital comics for the iPhone and iPod Touch through a number of retailers including Panelfly, comiXology and iVerse. Unlike Marvel Unlimited, these comics are available for purchase as single issues. In addition, it was announced in August 2009 that Marvel's comics would be released for the PlayStation Portable in December 2009.

== See also ==
- DC Universe Infinite
