= Kev Walker =

British comics artist and illustrator

- Born: Kevin Walker
- Areas: Writer, Penciller, Inker, Colourist
- Notable works: Judge Dredd; Daemonifuge; Marvel Zombies 3 and 4; Thunderbolts

Kevin Walker is a British comics artist and illustrator, based in Leeds, who worked mainly on 2000 AD and Warhammer comics and the collectible card game Magic: The Gathering. He is now working for Marvel Comics.

== Biography ==
Walker began his career in 1987 working on Future Shocks in 2000 AD, and followed this up with work on some of the anthology comic's most popular long-running stories, including Judge Dredd, Rogue Trooper (inking Steve Dillon's pencils), the ABC Warriors and Judge Anderson. During this period Walker also wrote a number of stories including Daemonifuge and The Inspectre, often with co-author Jim Campbell. In reviewing Daemonifuge: The Screaming Cage, critic Don D'Ammassa wrote, "The artwork is for the most part excellent." Jeff Zaleski wrote, "Walker's grayscale, b&w CGI artwork is extremely effective in the oversized format, and Walker's people look more human than most Warhammer characters."

Originally known for his glossy, painted style and the fine detail of his inked work, Walker has since 1998 changed the way he works, using a high contrast black line style with heavy shadows coupled with flat computer colouring, reminiscent of the work of Mike Mignola.

From 2002 onwards, despite a couple of Judge Dredd stories, he has largely worked on American comic books starting with The Legion at DC Comics, written by Dan Abnett and Andy Lanning (DnA), before moving over to Marvel Comics. In April 2006, he worked on Marvel's cosmic crossover event, "Annihilation" with DnA plotting Nova, one of its four lead-ins.

In 2005, Walker was commissioned by design agency ODD to draw the character of a 13-year-old James Bond for Charlie Higson's first Young Bond novel SilverFin. He also illustrated a graphic novel adaptation of SilverFin in 2008, and provided cover art for the Young Bond novels released in the U.S. by Hyperion Books.

Walker then provided the third installment of the Marvel Zombies series, with writer Fred Van Lente and the creative team stayed together for Marvel Zombies 4. He then teamed up with DnA again to draw the Realm of Kings: Imperial Guard limited series, before becoming the main artist on Thunderbolts following the Heroic Age reboot of the team.

== Bibliography ==
=== Comics ===
Comics work includes:

- Rogue Trooper:
  - "Cinnabar" (inks, with writer John Smith and pencils by Steve Dillon, in 2000 AD #624-630 & 633-635, 1989)
  - "The Arena of Long Knives" (with Michael Fleisher, in 1992 2000 AD Yearbook, 1991)
- Hellblazer:
  - "Thicker than Water" (with writer Jamie Delano and co-artist Ron Tiner, in Hellblazer #28, 1990)
  - "Sick at Heart" (with writer Jamie Delano and co-artist Ron Tiner, in Hellblazer #29, 1990)
- ABC Warriors (with writer Pat Mills):
  - "Khronicles of Khaos" (with co-author Tony Skinner, in 2000 AD #750-757, 780-784 & 787-790, 1991–1992)
  - "Dishonourable Discharge" (with co-author Tony Skinner, in 2000 AD Winter Special #4, 1992)
  - "Hellbringer Book I" (with co-author Tony Skinner, in 2000 AD #901-911, 1994)
  - "Hellbringer Book II" (with co-author Tony Skinner, in 2000 AD #964-971, 1995)
  - "Roadkill" (in 2000 AD Prog 2000, 1999)
- Anderson: Psi Division: "Childhood's End" (with Alan Grant, in Judge Dredd Megazine vol. 2 #27-34, 1993)
- Wynter: "Cold Justice" (with Robbie Morrison, in Judge Dredd Megazine vol. 2 #70, January 1995)
- The Inspectre (illustrated only the first three episodes, but co-wrote all eleven with Jim Campbell, in Judge Dredd Megazine vol. 3 #23-33, 1996–1997)
- Mercy Heights: "Mercy Heights" (with John Tomlinson, in 2000 AD #1033-1047, 1997)
- The Balls Brothers (with John Wagner, in 2000 AD #1128-1131 & 1141-1147, 1999)
- Badlands (with Dan Abnett, in 2000 AD #1178-1182, 2000)
- Mean Machine: "Born Mean" (with Gordon Rennie, in Judge Dredd Megazine vol. 3 #69, 2000)
- Daemonifuge: Heretic Saint (trade paperback, Black Library, 208 pages, 2005, ISBN 978-1-84416-251-2) collects:
  - Daemonifuge (co-author and artist, with Jim Campbell, 88 pages, paperback, 2000, ISBN 1-84154-117-6, hardcover, 2002, ISBN 1-84154-261-X)
  - Daemonifuge: The Screaming Cage (co-author and artist, with Jim Campbell, 24 pages, 2002)
  - Daemonifuge: The Lord of Damnation (co-author with Gordon Rennie and art by Karl Richardson, 88 pages, 2003, ISBN 1-84154-240-7)
- Tor Cyan (with John Tomlinson):
  - "Blue Murder" (in 2000 AD #1223-1226, 2001)
  - "Crucible" (in 2000 AD #1250-1251, 2001)
  - "Refugee" (in 2000 AD #1252-1253, 2001)
- Judge Dredd:
  - "Sin City" (with John Wagner, in 2000 AD #1289-1299, 2002)
  - "Mandroid" (with John Wagner, in 2000 AD #1452-1465, 2005)
  - "The Connection" (with John Wagner, in 2000 AD #1500-1504, 2006)
  - "Snakebite" (with Robbie Morrison, in Judge Dredd Megazine #289-290, October–November 2009)
- The Legion #10, 13, 15-16 (with Dan Abnett/Andy Lanning, DC Comics, 2002)
- Exiles #23-25 (with Judd Winick, Marvel Comics, 2003)
- The Eternal #1-6 (pencils, with writer Chuck Austen and inks by Simon Coleby, Marvel MAX, August 2003–January 2004)
- "Long Distance Caller" (script and art, in Hellboy Weird Tales #7, Dark Horse Comics, 2004)
- Annihilation: Nova (pencils, with writers Dan Abnett/Andy Lanning and inks by Rick Magyar, Marvel Comics, 4-issue mini-series, 2006)
- Marvel Zombies (with writer Fred Van Lente, Marvel Comics):
  - Marvel Zombies 3 (4-issue mini-series, October 2008–January 2009, hardcover, 104 pages, May 2009, ISBN 0-7851-3635-5)
  - Marvel Zombies 4 (4-issue mini-series, June–September 2009, hardcover, 112 pages, November 2009, ISBN 0-7851-3917-6))
- SilverFin: The Graphic Novel (with writer Charlie Higson, Puffin, 2008)
- Realm of Kings: Imperial Guard (with Dan Abnett/Andy Lanning, 5-issue limited series, Marvel Comics, January–May 2010, TPB, 120 pages, June 2010, ISBN 0-7851-4597-4)
- Thunderbolts #144-147, 150-153, 155-158, 163-165 (with Jeff Parker, Marvel Comics, July 2010–2012)
- Secret Avengers #17 (with Warren Ellis, Marvel Comics, 2011)
- Dark Avengers #176-179 (with Jeff Parker, Marvel Comics, 2012)
- Avengers Arena #1-3, 5-6, 8-9, 12, 14-15, 17-18 (with Dennis Hopeless, Marvel Comics, 2013)
- Avengers Undercover #1-5, 7 (with Dennis Hopeless, Marvel Comics, 2014)
- New Avengers Vol. 3 #22-23, 25-26, 29, 31 (with Jonathan Hickman, Marvel Comics, 2014–2015)
- Avengers Vol. 4 #44 (with Jonathan Hickman, Marvel Comics, 2015)
- Marvel Zombies Vol. 2 #1-4, (with Si Spurrier, Marvel Comics, 2015)
- Black Knight Vol. 3 #2-3 (with Frank Tieri, Marvel Comics, 2015-16)
- Doctor Strange Vol. 4 #6 (with Jason Aaron, Marvel Comics, 2016)
- Illuminati #5 (with Joshua Williamson, Marvel Comics, 2016)
- Uncanny Inhumans #8-10, Annual 1 (with Charles Soule, Marvel Comics, 2016)
- Star Wars: Doctor Aphra #1-6, 9-13, 20-25 (with Kieron Gillen and Si Spurrier, Marvel Comics, 2016-18
- Darkhawk #51 (with Chad Bowers and Chris Sims, Marvel Comics, 2017)
- Star Wars: DJ: Most Wanted One-Shot (with Ben Acker and Ben Blacker, Marvel Comics, 2018)
- Venom Annual #1 (with Donny Cates, Marvel Comics, 2018)
- Infinity Warps #2 "Kamala Kang" (with Christopher Hastings, Marvel Comics, 2018)
- Black Panther Vol. 7 #7-11 (with Ta-Nehisi Coates, Marvel Comics, 2018-19)
- The Amazing Spider-Man Vol. 5 #25-28 (with Nick Spencer, Marvel Comics, 2019)
- Dr. Strange: Surgeon Supreme #1-6 (with Mark Waid, Marvel Comics, 2019-20)
- Wolverine: Black, White & Blood #2 "Seeing Red" (with Saladin Ahmed, Marvel Comics, 2020)
- Savage Avengers #17-19 (with Gerry Duggan, Marvel Comics, 2021)
- Venom Vol. 4 #35 (with Donny Cates, Marvel Comics, 2021)
- Timeless One-Shot (with Jed MacKay, Marvel Comics, 2021)
- Avengers Forever Infinity Comics #1-4 (with Jason Aaron, Marvel Comics, 2022)
- Avengers 1,000,000 B.C. One-Shot (with Jason Aaron, Marvel Comics, 2022)
- Predator #1-6 (with Ed Brisson, Marvel Comics, 2022)
- Guardians of the Galaxy Vol. 7 #1-5, 7-11, Annual #1 (with Jackson Lanzing & Collin Kelly, Marvel Comics, 2023-2024)
- Union Jack the Ripper: Blood Hunt #1-3 (with Cavan Scott, Marvel Comics, 2024)
- Venom War: Wolverine #1-3 (with Tim Seeley and Tony Fleecs, Marvel Comics, 2024)
- The Amazing Spider-Man Vol. 6 #65. DEATHS (with Derek Landy, Marvel Comics, 2025)

=== Games ===
RPG art work includes:

- Apocrypha Now (Warhammer Fantasy Roleplay) (Hogshead Publishing Ltd., 1995): Interior Artist
- Warhammer Fantasy Roleplay GM's Screen & Reference Pack (Hogshead Publishing Ltd., 1997): Interior Artist
- Dungeons & Dragons Dungeon Master's Guide (WotC, 2000): Interior Artist
- Apocrypha 2: Charts of Darkness (Warhammer FRP) (Hogshead Publishing Ltd., 2000): Interior Artist, Diagrams, and Maps
- The Wheel of Time Roleplaying Game (WotC, 2001): Interior Artist
- The Judge Dredd Roleplaying Game (Mongoose Publishing, 2002): Cover Artist
- Faiths and Pantheons (Forgotten Realms) (WotC, 2002): Interior Artist
- Dungeons & Dragons Dungeon Master's Guide v.3.5 (WotC, 2003): Interior Artist
- Eberron Campaign Setting (WotC, 2004): Interior Artist
- Races of Eberron (Wizards of the Coast, 2005): Interior Artist
- The X-Men TCG (Wizards of the Coast, 2000): Interior Artist
- Magic: The Gathering (Wizards of the Coast, 1996): Artist
- Hearthstone (Blizzard Entertainment), 2013

=== Magazines ===
Magazine work includes:

- Dragon #277 (November 2000): Cover Artist
- Dragon #287 (September 2001): Cover Artist
- Dragon #295 (Paizo Publishing, May 2002) "Every Home a Castle": Interior Artist

=== Record covers ===
Record cover work includes:

- Autopsy - Severed Survival (Peaceville, 1990): Cover Artist, alternative cover
- Autopsy - Mental Funeral (Peaceville, 1991): Cover Artist
- Toranaga - Bastard Ballads (Peaceville, 1988): Cover Artist
