= Fred Van Lente =

American writer (born 1972)

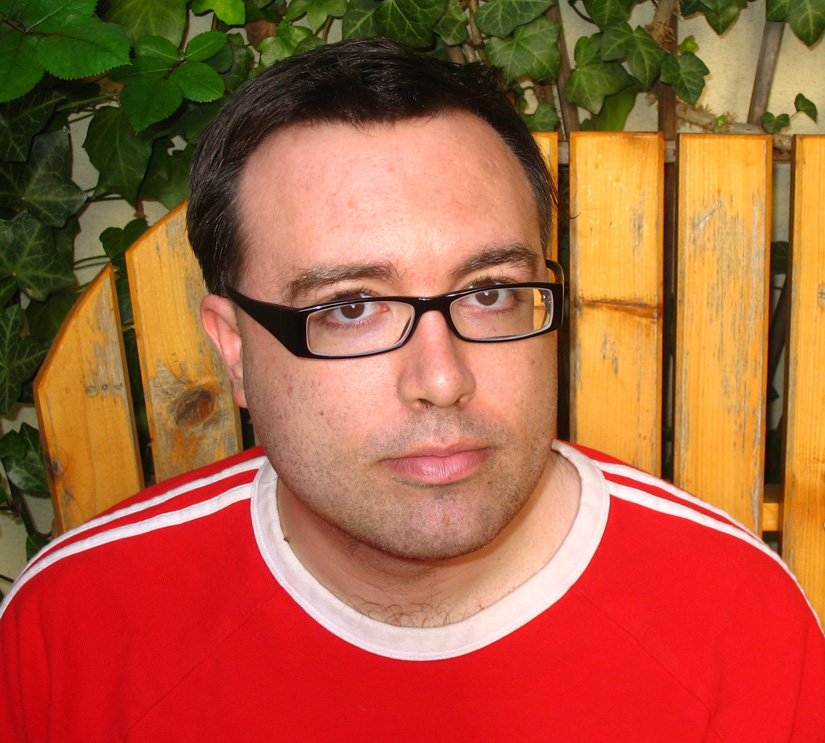
- Van Lente in 2007
- Born: February 14, 1972 (age 54) Tacoma, Washington, U.S.
- Area: Writer
- Notable works: Archer & Armstrong; Action Philosophers; The Weapon; Cowboys & Aliens; Halo: Bloodlines; Ultimate OZ Universe; Marvel Adventures Spider-Man; Spider-Man: Brand New Day; X-Men Noir; Incredible Hercules; Marvel Zombies 3 Marvel Zombies 4 Hulk: Season One

Fred Van Lente (born February 14, 1972, in Tacoma, Washington) from Chagrin Falls, Ohio is an American writer, primarily of comic books and graphic novels.

== Career ==
Van Lente is the co-founder, along with artist Ryan Dunlavey, of Evil Twin Comics, which produces his and Dunlavey’s non-fiction comic books, the first and most famous of which is Action Philosophers.

Recent work includes becoming the ongoing co-author of Incredible Hercules with Greg Pak, as well as writing Marvel Zombies 3 and Marvel Zombies 4. with Kev Walker and X-Men Noir with Dennis Calero. Upcoming work includes two one-shots as part of Marvel Zombies Return. He also wrote the first issue of Deadpool Team-Up (number #899 as it was counting backwards from the #900 special).

Van Lente created a new Power Man, Victor Alvarez, who first appeared in the Shadowland: Power Man mini-series, then in a new Power Man and Iron Fist series, also by Van Lente.

Van Lente and New York Innovative Theatre Awards-winner Crystal Skillman co-authored and staged "King Kirby," a play based on the life of innovative comics creator Jack Kirby. "King Kirby" was staged at Brooklyn's Brick Theater as part of its annual Comic Book Theater Festival. The play was a New York Times Critics' Pick selection and was funded by a widely publicized Kickstarter campaign.

Van Lente has been called "one of the most idiosyncratic and insightful new voices in comics." In 2014, he was nominated for a Harvey Award in the category, Special Award for Humor in Comics.

== Bibliography ==
- "Tranquility in The Big Date" (with Steve Ellis, in Negative Burn #40, Caliber Comics, 1996)
- The Silencers: Black Kiss (with Steve Ellis, 2-issue limited series, Moonstone Books, 2003, tpb, 2005, ISBN 978-1-933076-01-0)
- Action Philosophers (with Ryan Dunlavey, Evil Twin Comics, April 2005 – July 2007) collected as:
  - Volume 1 (2006, ISBN 978-0-9778329-0-3)
  - Volume 2 (2006, ISBN 978-0-9778329-1-0)
  - Volume 3 (2007, ISBN 978-0-9778329-2-7)
- Scorpion: Poison Tomorrow (with Leonard Kirk, in Amazing Fantasy #7–12, Marvel Comics, June – November 2005, tpb, 2005, ISBN 978-0-7851-1712-4)
- Cowboys & Aliens (with co-author Andrew Foley and art by Luciano Lima, graphic novel, Platinum Studios, 2006, ISBN 978-1582407241)
- Watchdogs (with Brian Churilla, Platinum Studios, 2007, ISBN 978-1-934220-05-4)
- The Weapon (with Scott Koblish, 4-issue limited series, Platinum Studios, June–September 2007)
- Marvel Adventures Spider-Man #21–24, 33–36 (with Cory Hamscher, Marvel Comics, 2007, 2008) collected as:
  - Volume 6: The Black Costume (collects Marvel Adventures Spider-Man #21–24, 2007, ISBN 978-1-934220-05-4)
  - Volume 9: Fiercest Foes (collects Marvel Adventures Spider-Man #33–36, May 2008)
- Marvel Adventures Fantastic Four Vol. 6: Monsters & Mysteries (with Clay Mann, Marvel Comics, 2007, ISBN 978-0-7851-2380-4)
- Marvel Adventures Iron Man Volume 1: Heart of Steel (with James Cordeiro, Marvel Comics, 2007, ISBN 978-0-7851-2644-7)
- The Incredible Hercules #112–141 (with co-author Greg Pak and art by Khoi Pham, Rafa Sandoval, and others, Marvel Comics, 2008–2010) collected as:
  - Against The World (collects Incredible Hulk #112 and Incredible Hercules #113–115 and "Hulk vs. Hercules: When Titans Collide", 136 pages, hardcover, July 2008, ISBN 0-7851-3312-7, softcover, October 2008, ISBN 0-7851-2533-7)
  - Secret Invasion (collects Incredible Hercules #116–120, hardcover, November 2008, ISBN 0-7851-3333-X, softcover, March 2009, ISBN 0-7851-2829-8)
  - Love and War (collects Incredible Hercules #121–125, 128 pages, hardcover, March 2009, ISBN 0-7851-3334-8, softcover, June 2009, ISBN 0-7851-3246-5)
  - Dark Reign (collects Incredible Hercules #126–131, 160 pages, hardcover, October 2009, ISBN 0-7851-3830-7)
- Hercules: Fall of an Avenger #1–2 (with co-author Greg Pak and art by Ariel Olivetti, Marvel Comics, March – April 2010)
- Marvel Zombies 3 (with Kev Walker, 4-issue limited series, Marvel Comics, December 2008 – March 2009, TPB, 104 pages, hardcover, May 2009, ISBN 0-7851-3635-5, softcover, December 2009, ISBN 0-7851-3526-X)
- X-Men Noir (with Dennis Calero, 4-issue limited series, Marvel Comics, February – May 2009)
- Marvel Zombies 4 (with Kev Walker, 4-issue limited series, Marvel Comics, June – September 2009, hardcover, November 2009, ISBN 0-7851-3917-6)
- Marvel Zombies Return (Marvel Comics):
- Marvel Zombies Return: Spider-Man (with artist Nick Dragotta, one-shot, 2009)
- Marvel Zombies Return: Avengers (with artist Wellington Alves (artist), one-shot, 2009)
- Silent But Deadly (with Dalibor Talajic, in Deadpool #900, Marvel Comics, December 2009)
- Deadpool Team-Up #899 (with Dalibor Talajic, ongoing series, Marvel Comics, January 2010)
- Heroic Age: Prince of Power #1-4 (with Greg Pak, and art by Reilly Brown, Marvel Comics July– October 2010)
- Odd Is On Our Side (with Dean Koontz, and art by Queenie Chan, Del Rey Books, October 2010)
- Shadowland: Power Man (with Mahmud Asrar, 4-issue limited series, Marvel Comics, October 2010 – January 2011)
- Power Man and Iron Fist (with Wellinton Alves (artist), 5-issue limited series, Marvel Comics, April – July 2011)
- "The Chosen" (with Alessandro Vitti, in Fear Itself: The Home Front #5-7, Marvel Comics, October – December 2011)
- Archer & Armstrong, Valiant Comics, May 2012 – present
- Ivar, Timewalker 12-issue limited series, Valiant Comics, January 2015 – December 2015
- Assassin’s Creed: Templars (with Dennis Calero, Titan Comics, March 2016 – January 2017)
- Ten Dead Comedians: A Murder Mystery, July 2017, ISBN 1-5947-4974-4
- The Future Is ******, REKCAH Comics, May 2025 – May 2030

== Awards ==
Van Lente's industry awards include Action Philosophers receiving a Xeric Grant in 2004; it was also nominated for an Ignatz Award in 2005 and 2006. The American Library Association named Action Philosophers a "Great Graphic Novel for Teens" in 2007. His "super crime" series The Silencers was named "Best Independent Super Hero Comic" by Broken Frontier in 2003.
