= Frank Tieri (writer) =

American comic book writer

- Born: Brooklyn, New York, U.S.
- Area: Writer
- Notable works: Wolverine; Space: Punisher; Punisher Noir; Deadpool; Iron Man

Frank Tieri is an American comic book writer and former digital comics editor. He is known for his work on Marvel Comics titles including Iron Man, Wolverine, Weapon X, and New Excalibur, as well as his contributions to DC Comics, Archie Comics, television, and video games. Before becoming a professional comic book writer, Tieri worked as head writer and editor of Marvel.com during the company's early expansion into online publishing.

== Career ==
=== Early career and Marvel Interactive ===
Tieri attended St. John's University, where he majored in graphic design and minored in English. While attending university, he interned at Marvel Comics, later holding several staff positions before becoming head writer and editor of Marvel.com. In a 2005 interview with Marvel editor Mike Marts, Tieri discussed how his internship and subsequent editorial experience helped him establish a professional writing career.

During the late 1990s, Tieri worked at Marvel Interactive, the company's digital entertainment division, during its early experiments with online comics and digital storytelling. These initiatives included Marvel CyberComics, which adapted comic book storytelling for internet audiences through sequential artwork, animation, and interactive presentation.

Writer David Gallaher, who worked as an intern at Marvel Interactive in 1999, identified Tieri among his mentors at the company, alongside John Cerilli, Gregg Sanderson, and Tracy Kubert.

In 1999, Marvel Interactive staged an April Fools' Day publicity campaign announcing a fictional four-issue Marvel Knights series, Spider-Man: X Marks the Spider, which purportedly revealed that Spider-Man was a mutant joining the X-Men. The campaign was conceived by John Cerilli (and the Marvel Interactive team, including Frank Tieri) and featured contributions from writer Joe Kelly and artist Jimmy Palmiotti. The fictional announcement circulated across comic book news websites and was subsequently discussed in Wizard magazine. Gallaher later recounted the campaign in a 2024 retrospective of his time at Marvel Interactive.

=== Marvel Comics ===
Tieri transitioned from digital editorial work to writing print comics professionally in 2000. His early assignments included Iron Man and Wolverine, establishing his association with several of Marvel's established characters.

His subsequent Marvel work included Weapon X, New Excalibur, Underworld, a Hercules miniseries following the events of "Avengers Disassembled", Wolverine/Darkness, X-Men: Dracula vs. Apocalypse, Civil War: War Crimes, and World War Hulk: Gamma Corps.

His other Marvel writing credits include Deadpool, Punisher, and Black Knight, alongside contributions to crossover events and limited series.

=== Digital comics ===
Tieri continued contributing to digital comics after establishing his print writing career. In October 2008, he wrote The Marvels Channel: Monsters, Myths, and Marvels, an original digital comic illustrated by Juan Santacruz for Marvel Digital Comics Unlimited.

The story presented a fictional investigation into the existence of Galactus, using a documentary-style narrative to question the cosmic character's origins. It was released on October 22, 2008, as part of Marvel's expansion of exclusive online comics.

=== DC Comics ===
For DC Comics, Tieri wrote stories for JSA Classified, the Countdown tie-in Lord Havok and the Extremists, Gotham Underground, and Batman and the Outsiders.

His later DC work included Catwoman, Harley Quinn, Old Lady Harley, The Savage Hawkman, and stories connected to the Dark Nights: Metal and Dark Nights: Death Metal events.

=== Other publishers ===
Outside Marvel and DC, Tieri has written for several comic book publishers, including Top Cow Productions, Dynamite Entertainment, and Archie Comics.

His work includes The Darkness, Red Sonja: The Black Tower, The Hangman, Jughead: The Hunger, Jughead: The Hunger vs. Vampironica, and Vampironica: New Blood.

He has also written licensed comics connected to properties such as Godzilla and Mafia III.

=== Video games and television ===
Tieri wrote the story material for the 2011 fighting game Marvel vs. Capcom 3: Fate of Two Worlds, which featured characters from Marvel Comics and Capcom franchises. His work included character dialogue, endings, and maintaining consistency with established Marvel characterizations.

He returned as a writer for Ultimate Marvel vs. Capcom 3 (2011), contributing new character endings and dialogue.

In December 2016, Tieri confirmed his involvement in the development of Marvel vs. Capcom: Infinite, although he did not disclose the nature of his contributions.

In television, Tieri co-wrote "The Iron Octopus" with Man of Action, an episode of the animated series Ultimate Spider-Man. The episode premiered on September 30, 2012.

== Influences ==
Tieri has identified a broad range of influences on his writing, including comic books, literature, film, television, music, and personal experiences. In a 2005 interview with Marvel editor Mike Marts, he emphasized the importance of drawing inspiration from everyday life, personal relationships, and individual experiences rather than relying exclusively on other comic book creators.

Among his early comic book influences, Tieri cited Chris Claremont's Uncanny X-Men, Frank Miller's Daredevil, John Byrne's Fantastic Four, and Walter Simonson's Thor. He particularly admired Marvel's emphasis on flawed, relatable characters, which he contrasted with his perceptions of DC Comics' traditional superhero archetypes. Tieri also identified Wolverine as a favorite character, citing the character's contradictions, personal code, and determination.

Tieri has also described influences specific to individual projects. In discussing Godzilla: Here There Be Dragons and its sequel, he identified the Godzilla films, Kong: Skull Island, the Pirates of the Caribbean films, the works of Jules Verne, and the television series Lost as creative influences on the series.

For Whatever Happened to the Crimson Justice?, Tieri acknowledged influences from Batman and traditional superhero-and-sidekick partnerships, including Green Arrow and Speedy, and Captain America and Bucky Barnes. He described the series as an examination of how those relationships might be understood differently across generations.

== Reception ==
Tieri's comic book writing has received varied critical responses, with reviewers assessing his work across superhero, horror, and licensed franchises.

His work on Marvel's Weapon X received criticism during its original publication. In a 2004 review of issue #21 for Inside Pulse, Jesse Baker criticized the series' handling of character revelations and supporting characters, while acknowledging Tieri's portrayal of Wolverine.

Tieri's 2017 horror comic Jughead: The Hunger, illustrated by Michael Walsh, received generally favorable reviews. The debut issue earned an average professional critic rating of 8.0 out of 10 from 25 reviews aggregated by Comic Book Roundup. In a review for AIPT, the critic praised Tieri's characterization, backstory, and treatment of Jughead's transformation, but criticized the story's reliance on the increasingly familiar practice of reimagining Archie characters through horror.

His subsequent crossover Jughead: The Hunger vs. Vampironica also received generally favorable reviews, with critics highlighting its combination of horror and the traditional Archie Comics setting, although some criticized the limited presence of the Jughead: The Hunger characters in the opening issue.

At DC Comics, Tieri's Old Lady Harley (2018), illustrated by Iñaki Miranda, received mixed reviews. Comic Book Roundup reported an average professional critic rating of 7.4 out of 10 for its first issue, based on 19 reviews. Ray Goldfield of GeekDad criticized the comic's reliance on familiar post-apocalyptic conventions while acknowledging its humor and action.

== Awards and nominations ==
In 2024, Godzilla: Here There Be Dragons, written by Tieri and illustrated by Iñaki Miranda, was nominated for the Eisner Award for Best Limited Series.

Year	Award	Category	Work	Result
2024	Eisner Award	Best Limited Series	Godzilla: Here There Be Dragons, with Iñaki Miranda	Nominated

== Bibliography ==
=== Marvel Comics ===
Title	Issues / publication	Artists and collaborators	Collected editions / notes
Astonishing Tales (vol. 2)	#5 (2009)	Marco Turini	"Shiver"
AXIS: Revolutions	#2 (2014)	Paul Davidson	"Ain't the Man I Used to Be"; collected in AXIS: Revolutions (2015), ISBN 978-0-7851-9768-3
Black Knight (vol. 3)	#1–5 (2015–2016)	Luca Pizzari	"Dark Knight"; collected in Black Knight: The Fall of Dane Whitman (2016), ISBN 978-1-302-90031-1
Original Sins	#2 (2014)	Paul Davidson	"Black Legacy"; collected in Black Knight: The Fall of Dane Whitman
Captain America	#616 (2011)	Paul Azaceta	"The Exhibit"; collected in Captain America: Prisoner of War (2011)
Civil War: War Crimes	One-shot (2006)	Staz Johnson	Collected in Civil War: War Crimes (2007), ISBN 978-0-7851-2652-2
Dark Reign: Lethal Legion	#1–3 (2009)	Mateus Santolouco	Collected in Dark Reign: The Underside (2009)
Dark Reign: Made Men	#1 (2009)	Khoi Pham	"Spymaster"; collected in Dark Reign: The Underside
Fear Itself: The Worthy	One-shot (2011)	Eric Canete	"Shades of Gray"; collected in Fear Itself: Spider-Man (2012)
World War Hulk: Gamma Corps	#1–4 (2007)	Carlos Ferreira	"Hulkbusters", "Origins", "Love and War", "Accomplished"; collected in World War Hulk: Gamma Corps (2008), ISBN 978-0-7851-2804-5
Incredible Hulk: The Fury Files	One-shot (2008)	Steve Lieber	
Hercules (vol. 3)	#1–5 (2005)	Mark Texeira	"The New Labors of Hercules"; collected in Hercules: New Labors of Hercules (2005), ISBN 978-0-7851-1752-0
Infinity: Heist	#1–4 (2013–2014)	Al Barrionuevo	Collected in Infinity: Heist/Hunt (2014), ISBN 978-0-7851-8924-4
Iron Fist 50th Anniversary Special	2024	Various	Anniversary anthology
Iron Man (vol. 3)	#31–35 (2000)	Various	Early writing contributions; individual credits require verification
Iron Man Annual 2000	2000	Various	Early writing credit
Iron Man (vol. 3)	#37–49 (2000–2001)	Alitha Martinez, Keron Grant, Omar Dogan, Chris Batista	"Remote Control" (#37–40), "Aftermath" (#41), "The Big Bang Theory" (#42–44), "Conclusion" (#45), "The Frankenstein Syndrome" (#46–48), "'Nuff Said" (#49)
Iron Man Annual 2001	2001	Craig Wilson	"Black and White"
Doomed 2099	2025		
Doom 2099: Rage of Doom	2026		
Marvel TV: Galactus – The Real Story	One-shot (2009)	Juan Santacruz	"Monsters, Myths and Marvels"; originally developed for Marvel's digital comics program
Marvel Universe Avengers: Earth's Mightiest Heroes	#11 (2013)	Tim Levins	"With Friends Like These"
Marvel Universe Live! Prelude	One-shot (2014)	Miguel Sepulveda	
Punisher Noir	#1–4 (2009)	Paul Azaceta, Antonio Fuso	"Home Is Where the War Is", "Punisher & Son", "Two Down...", "The Last Words of Dutch Schultz"; collected in Punisher Noir (2010), ISBN 978-0-7851-3943-0
Space: Punisher	#1–4 (2012)	Mark Texeira	Collected in Space: Punisher (2012), ISBN 978-0-7851-6367-1
Secret Wars Journal	#3 (2015)	Richard Isanove	"Who Killed Tony Stark?"; collected in Secret Wars Journal/Battleworld (2016)
The Amazing Spider-Man	#662 (2011)	Javier Rodríguez	"Introducing: Magnetic Man in The Choice"
Ultimate Spider-Man Adventures	#4 (2012)	Eugene Son, Nuno Plati	
Web of Spider-Man (vol. 2)	#4 (2010)	Eric Canete	"Western Promises"; collected in Spider-Man: New York Stories (2011)
What If? Spider-Man: House of M	One-shot (2009)	Brian Haberlin	"What If... Spider-Man Intervened for the Scarlet Witch"
Thunderbolts	#159 (2011)	Matthew Southworth	"Double Cross"; collected in Fear Itself: Thunderbolts (2012)
Underworld	#1–5 (2006)	Staz Johnson	Collected in Civil War: War Crimes (2007)
Cable and X-Force	#9 (2013)	Salvador Larroca	Collected in Cable and X-Force: Dead or Alive (2013)
Deadpool (vol. 1)	#57–64 (2001–2002)	Georges Jeanty, Jim Calafiore	"Agent of Weapon X" (#57–60), "Funeral for a Freak" (#61–64); collected in Deadpool Classic, vol. 8 (2013), ISBN 978-0-7851-6732-7
Deadpool Corps	#1 (2010)	Matteo Scalera	"Dead Man Talking"; collected in Deadpool Corps: Pool-Pocalypse (2010)
Deadpool Team-Up	#891 (2010)	Chris Staggs	"X Marks the Spot"; collected in Deadpool Team-Up: Special Relationship (2010)
Deadpool (vol. 3)	#27 (2014)	Dexter Soy	"So Deadpool Walks Into a Bar..." and "There Will Be No Honeymoon"; collected in Deadpool: The Wedding of Deadpool (2014)
New Excalibur	#9–15 (2006–2007)	Scott Kolins, Michael Ryan, Jim Calafiore	"Chamber" (#9), "The Last Days of Camelot" (#10–12), "Unredeemed" (#13–15); collected in New Excalibur: Last Days of Camelot (2007), ISBN 978-0-7851-2221-2
Weapon X (vol. 2)	#1–28 (2002–2004)	Georges Jeanty, Keron Grant, Pop Mhan, John Paul Leon, Jeff Johnson, Roger Robinson, Tom Mandrake	Includes "The Hunt for Sabretooth", "Monsters", "The Underground", "Sinister's List", "Defection", "Countdown to Zero", "The End?", "War of the Programs", and "Man and Monster"
Weapon X: Days of Future Now	#1–5 (2005)	Bart Sears, Andy Smith	Collected in Weapon X: Days of Future Now (2006), ISBN 978-0-7851-1749-0
Savage Wolverine	#20 (2014)	Felix Ruiz	"Valentine's Day"; collected in Savage Wolverine: The Best There Is (2014)
Wolverine (vol. 2)	#159–186 (2000–2003)	Sean Chen, Mark Texeira, Barry Windsor-Smith, Dan Fraga, Georges Jeanty, Terry Dodson	Includes "The Best There Is", "The Hunted", "Blood Sport", "Stay Alive", "The Logan Files", and the "Law of the Jungle" stories
Wolverine Annual 2000	2000	Jorge Santamaria	"Family"; collected in Wolverine: The Return of Weapon X (2013)
Wolverine Annual 2001	2001	Matthew Marsilia	"The Watch"; collected in Wolverine: The Return of Weapon X
Wolverine and the X-Men (vol. 2)	#12 (2014)	Jorge Fornés	Collected in Death of Wolverine (2015)
Wolverine/Hercules: Myths, Monsters & Mutants	#1–4 (2011)	Juan Santacruz	Collected in Wolverine/Hercules: Myths, Monsters & Mutants (2011), ISBN 978-0-7851-4110-9
Wolverine: Mr. X	One-shot (2010)	Paco Diaz	"Unfinished Business"
Wolverine: Wendigo!	One-shot (2010)	Paul Gulacy	"Wendigo!"
X-Men: Apocalypse vs. Dracula	#1–4 (2006)	Clayton Henry	Collected in X-Men: Apocalypse vs. Dracula (2006), ISBN 978-0-7851-1948-7
X-Men: Manifest Destiny	#5 (2009)	Ben Oliver	"Nick's"; collected in X-Men: Manifest Destiny (2009)

=== DC Comics ===
Title	Issues / publication	Artists and collaborators	Collected editions / notes
JSA Classified	#26–27 (2007)	Matt Haley, Gordon Purcell	"Fight Game"
Countdown Presents: Lord Havok and the Extremists	#1–6 (2007–2008)	Liam Sharp, Mark Robinson	Collected in Lord Havok and the Extremists (2008), ISBN 978-1-4012-1844-7
Gotham Underground	#1–9 (2007–2008)	Jim Calafiore	Collected in Batman: Gotham Underground (2008), ISBN 978-1-4012-1928-4
Batman and the Outsiders (vol. 2)	#11–14 (2008)	Ryan Benjamin, Fernando Dagnino	"Batman R.I.P.: Outsiders No More" (#11–12), "The Network" (#13), "A Family Affair" (#14)
Batman (vol. 2)	#23.3 (2013)	Christian Duce	"Bullies"; Penguin Villains Month issue
Detective Comics (vol. 2)	#23.4 (2013)	Scot Eaton	"Descent"; Man-Bat Villains Month issue
Arkham Manor: Endgame	One-shot (2015)	Felix Ruiz, Robert Viacava, Christian Duce	Collected in The Joker: Endgame (2015)
Batman: The Murder Machine	#1 (2017)	James Tynion IV, Riccardo Federici	"Heavy Metal"; collected in Dark Nights: Metal – Dark Knights Rising (2018)
Batman: The Devastator	#1 (2017)	James Tynion IV, Tony S. Daniel	"Symphony of Destruction"; collected in Dark Nights: Metal – Dark Knights Rising (2018)
Absolute Batman: Ark M Special	One-shot (2026)	Scott Snyder, Joshua Hixson	Co-written with Scott Snyder
Convergence: Justice League	#1–2 (2015)	Vicente Cifuentes	Collected in Convergence: Flashpoint Book One (2015)
Convergence: Suicide Squad	#1–2 (2015)	Tom Mandrake	Collected in Convergence: Zero Hour Book One (2015)
Catwoman (vol. 4)	#47–52 (2015–2016)	Inaki Miranda, Geraldo Borges, Pop Mhan, Giuseppe Cafaro	"Run Like Hell" (#47–50), "Faceless" (#51–52); collected in Catwoman, vol. 8: Run Like Hell (2016), ISBN 978-1-4012-6486-4
Deathstroke/Yogi Bear Special	#1 (2018)	Mark Texeira	"Jellystone Dark"
Grifter	#0, #9–16 (2012–2013)	Rob Liefeld, Scott Clark, Marat Mychaels	Collected in Grifter, vol. 2: New Found Power (2013), ISBN 978-1-4012-4098-1
Harley Quinn and Her Gang of Harleys	#1–6 (2016)	Jimmy Palmiotti, Alain Mauricet, Dawn McTeigue	Collected in Harley Quinn and Her Gang of Harleys (2017), ISBN 978-1-4012-6785-8
The Savage Hawkman	#14–16 (2012–2013)	Rob Liefeld, Joe Bennett, Jack Jadson	"Hawkman: Wanted"; collected in The Savage Hawkman, vol. 2: Wanted (2013)

=== Top Cow Productions ===
Title	Issues / publication	Artists and collaborators	Collected editions / notes
The Darkness: Wanted Dead	One-shot (2003)	Mark Texeira	Collected in The Darkness: Demon Inside (2007)
The Darkness (vol. 2)	#14–16 (2004)	J. J. Kirby	"Streets Run Red"; collected in The Darkness: Demon Inside (2007), ISBN 978-1-58240-646-6
The Darkness/Wolverine	One-shot (2006)	Tyler Kirkham	Marvel/Top Cow crossover

=== Other publishers ===
Title	Publisher	Publication	Artists and collaborators
Red Sonja: The Black Tower	Dynamite Entertainment	#1–4 (2015)	Cezar Razek
The Hangman (vol. 2)	Dark Circle Comics	#1–4 (2015–2016)	Felix Ruiz
Jughead: The Hunger	Archie Comics	2017–2019	Michael Walsh and others
Jughead: The Hunger vs. Vampironica	Archie Comics	#1–5 (2019)	Various
Vampironica: New Blood	Archie Comics	#1–5 (2019–2020)	Various
Super Duck	Archie Comics	#1 (2020)	
Chilling Adventures Presents... Weirder Mysteries	Archie Comics	#1 (2022)	
Happy Horror Days	Archie Comics	#1 (2022)	
A Million Ways to Die Hard	Insight Comics	2018	

== Awards and nominations ==
Year	Award	Category	Nominated work	Result	Ref.
2024	Eisner Award	Best Limited Series	Godzilla: Here There Be Dragons, with Iñaki Miranda	Nominated	
