= Timewalker =

Publication information
- Publisher: Valiant Comics
- First appearance: Archer and Armstrong/Eternal Warrior #8 (March 1993)
- Created by: Barry Windsor-Smith

In-story information
- Alter ego: Ivar Anni-Padda
- Abilities: Immortal. Able to detect time arcs. Super-human strength and increased healing speed.

Ivar Anni-Padda, also known as the Timewalker or the "Forever Walker," is a fictional superhero in the Valiant Comics universe. Created by artist and writer Barry Windsor-Smith, he first appeared in the 1993 flipbook issue Archer and Armstrong #8/Eternal Warrior #8. He was then further developed in his own series Timewalker, which lasted 15 issues and also had a special #0 issue detailing his childhood.

Like his younger brothers Aram (also called Armstrong) and Gilad the Eternal Warrior, Ivar has immortality and enhanced physical traits, and is nearly invulnerable to injury. Since the 2012 Valiant Universe reboot, Gilad also has an immortal sister: Vexana the War-Monger.

Unlike his siblings, Ivar regularly travels through time by journeying through naturally occurring "time arcs," though he cannot control his destination without a highly advanced tachyon compass. As a man leading a non-linear life, and whose adventures sometimes overlap each other, Ivar is a cunning opportunist who will often manipulate others, friend or enemy, for his plans against evil to succeed.

== Publishing History ==
=== Original Valiant continuity ===
Originally, there were meant to be two immortal brothers in the Valiant Comics Universe - Gilad, the Eternal Warrior and Aram the other, better known as Armstrong. Each is older than recorded history although Gilad is the elder by two years. In Archer & Armstrong/Eternal Warrior #8 (a double-sized "flipbook" that was two issues in one), readers learned there was a third brother, Ivar the eldest. Ivar then starred in Timewalker, which ran for 15 issues. An extra origin issue, numbered #0, detailed his origin and childhood, showed his father Vandal, and explained why he was not present when his younger brothers Aram and Gilad were adults and discovered their own immortality.

=== Acclaim continuity ===
Acclaim Entertainment bought Valiant comics in 1994, leading to a reboot of the Valiant characters. In 1997, the graphic novel series Eternal Warriors reintroduced Ivar and his two brothers as Vikings, the sons of Mog and Nin, who become immortal due to a special plant. Collectively called the "Eternal Warriors," the three brothers fight evil together and share immortality with others over the centuries, creating the "Forever Family." The series started with the 1997 graphic novel Eternal Warriors: Time and Treachery by writer Art Holcomb and artists Doug Wheatley and John Floyd. The series ended in 1998 after five more graphic novels. In chronological order, they were: Eternal Warriors: Digital Alchemy, Eternal Warriors: Archer & Armstong, Eternal Warriors: Blackworks, Eternal Warriors: Mog, and Eternal Warriors: The Immortal Enemy.

=== 2012 Valiant continuity ===
Acclaim Entertainment declared bankruptcy in 2007 and the newly created Valiant Entertainment, Inc. bought back the rights to many characters. Valiant Comics was relaunched in 2012 with a rebooted universe. Ivar was reintroduced in 2012 in the first story arc of Archer & Armstrong Volume 2 by writer Fred Van Lente and artists Clayton Henry and Brian Reber. Archer & Armstrong #0 later revealed that the three brothers gained immortality when Ivar activated a strange machine known as the Boon, a device that gave them this gift by draining the life force from their entire home city-state and destroying the surrounding area. The same incident also temporarily removed Ivar from physical reality, turning him into a timewalker. In 2015, Ivar was the title star of the 12-issue series Ivar, Timewalker by Van Lente with art by Henry and Reber.

== Fictional character biography ==
=== Valiant Comics 1992-1996 ===
Born in a village of Anatolia over 3000 years before the celebrated birth of Jesus Christ, Ivar Anni-Padda is the son of Vandal, a fierce warrior. After his mother dies while giving birth to Vandal's youngest son, Aram, the boy Ivar flees the village in grief. While away, he learns he can sense folds in time or "time arcs" and then comes across a group of aliens and a woman named Jahk'rt, who is a "bio-manipulator" and a time traveler from the far future. Ivar returns to the village to warn them of the strange threats but finds it has already been raided and destroyed by other enemies, though Vandal and his two other sons escaped. Jahk'rt, sensing Ivar is special, then captures the boy and studies him for over a century, during which it is realized he stops aging during his adulthood and is nearly invulnerable to death. This last trait allows him to travel through time arcs safely without a vehicle, though he cannot control his destination. While Ivar is gone, his two younger brothers Gilad and Aram learn they are also enhanced and have immortality.

Freeing himself, Ivar runs across another prisoner, a young woman, and helps her escape. They fall in love but when Ivar takes them through a time arc to evade capture, she is killed by the stress of the journey. With a time compass he took from Jahk'rt, Ivar begins his long life as a "Timewalker," journeying back and forth through time, having many adventures and fighting many threats against humanity. He learns many languages, studies several fields, and becomes adept at a wide variety of weapons and fighting styles. On occasions, he reunited with his brother Gilad, now the ruthless Eternal Warrior, and Aram, the jovial adventurer who later calls himself Armstrong. A few exploits of the three brothers even inspire the tales of The Three Musketeers. Ivar also sometimes runs into various Geomancers, a long line of sorcerers who speak directly to the Earth and sometimes recruit heroes to help them against great evil.

During his travels, Ivar winds up in the middle of the future-era Harbinger Wars, bringing him into contact with the woman Faith Herbert and the last of the Rai warriors.

=== Acclaim Entertainment 1997-1998 ===
Long ago, the Viking warrior Mog has a wife Nin (a woman with one green eye and one brown eye) and three sons: Gilad, Ivar and Aram. Mog discovers a special herb he believes is connected to the gods. Calling it the Bloom, Mog shares it with their young sons, who begin growing rapidly and show increased physical abilities. Consuming the plant regularly, Mog gains a form of immortality and begins to hear voices he thinks are gods telling him it is his destiny to dominate Earth. When Nin shows concern for him, Mog decides she is jealous of his power and stabs her fatally. To save his mother, Ivar pushes her into the river where the Bloom plant was found. Mog destroys his village in a rage, then continues pursuing murder and conquest over the centuries. Eventually, he gains enough control over his rage to act clandestinely when he must. Nin, transformed by the Bloom, repeatedly confronts Mog, becoming his Immortal Enemy.

Reaching adulthood, Mog's sons realize they are ageless and nearly invulnerable. Working against threats to humanity, they become known as the Eternal Warriors. As the centuries go on, the three Eternal Warriors occasionally choose those they deem worthy to become immortal as well, sharing the Bloom with them. Those chosen become known as the Forever Family, and together they and mortal allies work in secret to fight evil and influence humanity for the better. Many of the Forever Family leave their old names behind, renaming themselves after weapons or items of significance. The three Eternal Warriors also earn individual titles among the Forever Family. Aram, also nicknamed "the Mighty Arm-Strong," becomes an Earth-based sorcerer known as a Geomancer. Gilad becomes known as Warmaster. Ivar, who discovers how to fold time and travel through the sub-dimension of "netherspace," earns the title Timewalker. With his "fold maps," Ivar and the Forever Family can teleport across Earth through netherspace portals. With a wrist-worn device, Ivar is able to control and navigate his journeys through time, though the device proves inaccurate at times (such as taking him to a Led Zeppelin concert rather than to a literal zeppelin).

In 1933 Berlin, Ivar is present when his mother Nin nearly kills his father Mog but is seriously injured herself. Unable to allow either parent to die but considering them both too dangerous to leave alone, Ivar traps Mog in a glacier and then imprisons Nin inside a place where magic spells prevent her from fully healing. It is decades before either is released.

In the modern-day, the Eternal Warriors have a hidden community in the Palazzo base in Rome that includes the Forever Family, several human allies, and the Neo-Vals, the last surviving descendants of the original Vikings. The Forever Family works together again against threats such as the corrupt organization Blackworks, whose leader Donald Kelvin discovers Mog. The father of the Eternal Warriors uses Blackworks resources to wage war, demanding leadership of the Forever Family and domination of Earth. To fight Mog, Ivar frees his imprisoned mother Nin. After several battles, Mog is defeated and the Eternal Warriors decide their efforts to help humanity have caused as much harm as good. They disband the Forever Family and go their separate ways.

The Acclaim version of Ivar the Timewalker is also featured in a two-issue team-up mini-series alongside the time-lost hero Turok. The two confront the villain Sabbath with the help of Master Darque.

=== Valiant Entertainment Reboot 2012 ===
Six thousand years ago in the ancient Mesopotamian city-state of Ur, Ivar Anni-Prada is a normal man and the eldest of four children. As an adult, he serves the city as a brilliant engineer, creating an irrigation system, effective defense walls, and lanterns powered by static electricity while in motion. One day, he and his brothers Aram and Gilad (the youngest) journey into the strange realm of Utnapishtim, also called "the Faraway." During their quest, they meet the Keepers of the Timeless Word, an order that safeguards a machine known as the Boon which sustains life in the Faraway, keeping it a timeless place without death. They take the machine but Gilad is fatally wounded. Ivar and Aram return to Ur and their young sister Vexana is grief-stricken, leaving Gilad's deathbed and fleeing the city. Ivar blames himself for Gilad's death and determines to use the Boon to restore Gilad, despite Aram's protests. Activated, the Boon drains the life force from the thousands who inhabit Ur and a massive explosion occurs, the Great Cataclysm. All those in Ur and the surrounding areas are killed, the city now in ruins. As a result, Gilad is not only resurrected, he and his two brothers are now immortals with enhanced bodies and minds.

The blast of the Great Cataclysm imprisons Ivar outside of physical reality, forcing him to walk through time. His two brothers eventually go their separate ways, with Aram later adopting the name Armstrong and Gilad becoming known as the Eternal Warrior, chosen by Earth itself to stop certain threats by any means necessary, often working with Geomancers who speak for the Earth. Unable to act directly in the physical world, Ivar eventually reaches out telepathically to the young warrior Obadiah Archer, who befriends Armstrong in the 21st century. Ivar helps guide the two of them to prevent an evil cult known as the Sect from reactivating the Boon.

Finally free of his imprisonment, Ivar can now walk through time via "time arcs" that naturally occur. Rather than simply pursuing a linear life, he regularly hops between different time eras, navigating with a "tachyon compass", while doing his best to protect Earth and sometimes even reality itself from evil and destruction. Known as a Timewalker, or to some time travelers as the "Forever Walker," Ivar works alongside many heroes and warriors in his adventures, occasionally recruiting his brothers as well. Due to the nature of his journeys, he often meets people out of linear order.

Vexana is also killed by the blast but then resurrected by dark spirits that grant her immortality and the ability to warp emotions. Seeing her home destroyed, Vexana worries her survival means she might be responsible for the Great Cataclysm. She leaves, her grief blocking out much of her memory and warping her mind. She becomes the War-Monger, a self-styled "agent of chaos" sparking conflicts around the world.

In the modern-day, Ivar encounters Dr. Neela Sethi just before the woman is about to invent time travel on Earth. He guides her on a journey through time so she can understand the nature of time travel, though secretly pursuing his own agenda. To aid him against the Null, a cult worshiping oblivion and hoping to erase the physical universe, Ivar recruits Sethi, Armstong, Amelia Earhart, and an older version of Gilad from the far future. After the threat of the Null is seemingly defeated, Ivar and Sethi go separate ways, apparently down different timelines.

== Superhuman Abilities ==
Like his brothers Aram and Gilad, Ivar Anni-Pada is ageless, invulnerable to disease and poison. He has superhuman strength, is more resistant to injury than an average human, has enhanced reflexes and speed, and his body heals from injury and damage. In the Acclaim Entertainment Comics continuity, immortals could still be killed by catastrophic injury, such as having most of their flesh and muscle destroyed, having their heads destroyed, or being bisected across the mid-section. His long life and unique experiences as a Timewalker have made him an expert at various forms of combat and highly knowledgeable in several fields.

Since 2012, the comics have said that a mysterious machine known as the Boon not only made Ivar and his brothers immortal and enhanced their bodies but also enhanced their mind. The three brothers now have minds with unlimited storage and analytical capacity, as well as perfect recall when necessary. Even if the brain is destroyed and must later regenerate, all memories and knowledge are retained. The Boon also equips the mind with a unique form of apathy, so that emotions do not play a prominent role in their thought processes (although they do still feel them). This makes them immune to depression and other forms of mental illness, allowing them to experience eternity without losing their sanity over time.

Along with his immortality, Ivar can sense and use naturally occurring folds and disruptions in time called "time arcs." He can then walk through these folds, instantly transporting himself to another time and place (though usually limited to Earth). Ivar cannot navigate his time travel without technology such as a tachyon compass.

Since the 2012 Valiant Entertainment Reboot, Ivar wears a chip called a "zelig" that acts as a universal translator and causes others to see his appearance, skin tone, and clothing as what they could expect from an average and non-threatening inhabitant of their local time and area. Having a zelig means he can see through the disguise of someone else's zelig.

== Collected editions ==
| Title | Material collected | Published date | ISBN |
|---|---|---|---|
| Ivar, Timewalker Vol. 1: Making History | Ivar, Timewalker #1-4 | June 2015 | 978-1939346636 |
| Ivar, Timewalker Vol. 2: Breaking History | Ivar, Timewalker #5-8 | October 2015 | 978-1939346834 |
| Ivar, Timewalker Vol. 3: Ending History | Ivar, Timewalker #9-12 | March 2016 | 978-1939346995 |
| Ivar, Timewalker Deluxe Edition | Ivar, Timewalker #1-12 | August 2016 | 978-1682151198 |
