= The Silencers (comics) =

The Silencers is a comic book series created by Fred Van Lente (writer) and Steve Ellis (artist). The series is published by Moonstone Books. The series involves The Silencers, super-powered humans that happen to be the muscle for the Provenzano Mob Family. The series follows The Cardinal and his squad of Silencers as a new drug family has infiltrated the Provenzano territory trafficking a new drug named Black Kiss. The focus of the series is the criminals, and while they are super-powered they are neither heroes nor villains.

A collected edition The Silencers:Black Kiss was published in 2005 by Moonstone collecting issues 1–4 with bonus material and story.
