= Box 13 =

Syndicated radio drama

- Running time: 30 minutes
- Country of origin: United States
- Language(s): English
- Starring: Alan Ladd; Sylvia Picker; Edmund MacDonald
- Announcer: Vern Carstensen
- Directed by: Vern Carstensen
- Produced by: Richard Sanville
- Original release: 22 August 1948 – 14 August 1949
- No. of episodes: 52

Box 13 is a syndicated radio drama about the escapades of newspaperman-turned-mystery novelist Dan Holiday, played by film star Alan Ladd. Created by Ladd's company, Mayfair Productions, Box 13 aired in different cities over different dates and times. It first aired in several United States radio markets in October 1947.

== Synopsis ==
To seek out new ideas for his fiction, Holiday ran a classified ad in the Star-Times newspaper where he formerly worked: "Adventure wanted, will go anywhere, do anything – write Box 13, Star-Times". The stories followed Holiday's adventures when he responded to the letters sent to him by such people as a psycho killer and various victims.

== Cast and crew ==
=== Main cast ===
- Alan Ladd as Dan Holiday
- Sylvia Picker as Holiday's scatterbrained secretary, Suzy.
- Edmund MacDonald as police Lt. Kling, Holiday's foil.

Guest cast members included Betty Lou Gerson, Frank Lovejoy, Lurene Tuttle, Alan Reed, Luis Van Rooten, and John Beal. Vern Carstensen, who directed Box 13 for producer Richard Sanville, was also the show's announcer. Raymond Burr appeared in some episodes.

=== Production ===
Richard Sanville was the producer. The series featured music by Rudy Schrager. Russell Hughes, who had previously hired Ladd as a radio actor in 1935 at a $19 weekly salary, wrote most of the scripts, sometimes in collaboration with Ladd. The partners in Mayfair Productions were Ladd and Bernie Joslin, who had previously run the chain of Mayfair Restaurants.

== Adaptations ==
At least one attempt to convert the series for television was tried when Ladd appeared in an adaptation of "Daytime Nightmare" (retitled "Committed") on CBS' General Electric Theater (December 5, 1954). Russell Hughes, who was then working at Columbia, reworked the script for the small screen. The show was produced by Jaguar, Ladd's own company.

The TV show did not result in a series. In 1956, Jaguar worked on another attempt to make a series, but Ladd was no longer cast as Holiday. Ladd's wife Sue Carol was reported as being involved in casting.

In 1958, Jaguar hired Charles Bennett to adapt the series into a television series.

In 1959, Ladd was working on scripts for TV series with Aaron Spelling. Bill Leslie was to play the lead, opposite Ann McRae.

Shortly before his death, Ladd announced plans to make a feature film version of the show. He said he would play the lead and the film would have featured 13 cameos from stars that Ladd had worked with in the past. Possible names included William Bendix, Veronica Lake, Brian Donlevy, and Macdonald Carey.

Box 13 was also re-imagined (rather than a straight adaptation or continuation) as a comic book series in 2010, by David Gallaher and Steve Ellis, and published by ComiXology. It is published digitally by ComiXology and published in print by Red 5 Comics.

== Episodes ==
#	Date	Title	Plot
01	Aug 22, 1948	"The First Letter"	A struggling writer, Dan Holiday, runs an ad in the newspaper seeking adventure. He receives his first letter - from a young woman needing help confronting her blackmailer of five years.
02	Aug 29, 1948	"Insurance Fraud"	An insurance agent writes to Box 13 wanting help to track down a man who has been missing for nearly seven years. He believes it is an insurance scam, and needs Dan to help prove it.
03	Sept 5, 1948	"Blackmail is Murder"	Agatha Marsh, eccentric old lady and a big fan of "the murder mysteries", has a problem - the corpse on the floor of her hotel room and contacts Box 13 for help.
04	Sept 12, 1948	"'Actor's Alibi"	A young actress approaches Dan for help after becoming convinced her life is in danger.
05	Sept 19, 1948	"Extra! Extra!"	Dan's neighbourhood newspaper stand boy asks for help after his father is arrested for taking part in a jewelry store heist.
06	Sept 26, 1948	"Shanghaied"	Suzy warns Dan about being shanghaied when he receives an anonymous letter daring him to go to Bay City Pier that night. He soon wishes he hadn't laughed off her warning.
07	Oct 3, 1948	"Short Assignment"	Walter Flit, a detective as short in nerve as he is in stature, asks Dan for help when one of his cases gets dangerous.
08	Oct 10, 1948	"Double Mothers"	Dan gets an anonymous note asking him to go to a park bench in the middle of the night, where he finds a little girl abandoned by her "mothers".
09	Oct 17, 1948	"A Book of Poems"	A book of Sir Walter Scott's poems are sent to Box 13, broken to fall open on a particular passage. Dan soon discovers that Fair Melrose is a real place, with a mystery - an arson that took the lives of its owners ten years ago. Dan must discover who sent the book and why.
10	Oct 24, 1948	"The Great Torino"	A magician's assistant, who believes her boss is trying to kill her during their act, asks Dan to protect her.
11	Oct 31, 1948	"Suicide or Murder?"	Dan is asked for help by the mother of a young reporter, who, upon the verge of a breakthrough, dies under mysterious circumstances.
12	Nov 7, 1948	"Triple Cross"	When a mysterious individual summons Dan to a casino, with very specific instructions on how to play and what to bet, he finds himself in the middle of a crooked scheme.
13	Nov 14, 1948	"Damsel in Distress"	A young college student appeals to Box 13 after receiving anonymous letters and calls threatening her life.
14	Nov 21, 1948	"Diamond in the Sky"	Dan is sent to Paris to be a decoy for a diamond merchant on a mission to collect priceless goods.
15	Nov 28, 1948	"Double Right Cross	Dan's friend, a boxer named Johnny Capelli, sends him a ringside seat ticket to his fight. That night Johnny loses badly and is accused of throwing the fight for financial gain, but Dan suspects sabotage.
16	Dec 5, 1948	"Look Pleasant, Please"	A young heiress with a string of dead fiancées asks to Dan have a photograph taken with her. A little strange, but seems innocent enough until the photograph appears in the newspaper the next day next to a phony engagement announcement.
17	Dec 12, 1948	"The Haunted Artist"	An artist begs Dan for help after mysterious additions keep appearing overnight on a painting he is working on.
18	Dec 19, 1948	"The Sad Night"	When a kid's copybook turns up at Box 13, followed by a letter asking for its return, Dan thinks nothing of it. But upon meeting the book's alleged owners, Dan finds there's something off about the whole business. Dan must discover whether the bizarre and grotesque drawing inside the book captioned "The Sad Night" be something more than just a child's scrawl.
19	Dec 26, 1948	"Hot Box"	A letter arrives at Box 13 instructing Dan to bid on a small Chinese box at an antiques auction. Luckily for Dan, he arrives late at the auction because, minutes later, the man wins the lot becomes a victim of a hit and run and the box is snatched from his body.
20	Jan 2, 1949	"The Better Man"	An eccentric millionaie hides $100,000 somewhere in the city and sets Dan head to head with a ruthless killer on a bizarre treasure hunt to find it.
21	Jan 9, 1949	"The Professor and the Puzzle"	
22	Jan 16, 1949	"The Dowager and Dan Holiday"	A reclusive, elderly millionairess asks Dan to pose her fiancée after suspecting her son's girlfriend has bad intentions.
23	Jan 23, 1949	"Three to Die"	Dan goes undercover as a sandhog where construction on a new tunnel under the city's river has been plagued with deadly sabotage.
24	Jan 30, 1949	"The Philanthropist"	A vagrant asks Dan to help him tack down his missing buddy, Suki, who disappeared after accepting a job from an organisation offering work to homeless men. Dan goes undercover and finds himself trapped in a philanthropist's dark and disturbing scheme.
25	Feb 6, 1949	"Last Will and Nursery Rhyme"	Dan is invited to stay in his old college friend, Ted's newly inherited mansion. He's got to solve the mystery of where Ted's miserly Uncle's millions have disappeared to before Ted is forced to sell the house - and the only clue is a book of kid's nursery rhymes.
26	Feb 13, 1949	"Delinquent Dilemma"	A helpless mother writes to Box 13 after her son is arrested for burglary, but the problem is that he's confessed. Dan suspects that someone is pressuring him to take the fall.
27	Feb 20, 1949	"Flash of Light"	The last thing young and naive Jerry Fuller remembers before blacking out is a strange flash of light. The next thing he knows is its two days later, his wallet is empty and he has no idea what's happened to him in the past 48 hours. Afraid and ashamed, the only place left for Jerry to turn for help is Box 13.
28	Feb 27, 1949	"Hare and Hounds"	Dan is hunted across the city after being framed for murder. He has to catch up with the real killer fast, before the police catch up with him.
29	Mar 6, 1949	"Hunt and Peck"	Martin Kirby is on death row for killing one of his best friends, and he's only got a few days to live. Writing to Box 13 is his last chance for proving his innocence.
30	Mar 13, 1949	"Death is a Doll"	Bart LaFaye is a perfectly healthy young man, but for some reason he's dying. Dan travels to a remote part of Louisiana to see if a Voodoo curse really could be responsible.
31	Mar 20, 1949	"113.5"	A young woman writes to Box 13 needing help finding her missing brother, but Dorothy Simmonds isn't all she seems.
32	Mar 27, 1949	"Dan and the Wonderful Lamp"	Following instructions to attend a charity bazaar, Dan comes away with the feeling of a day wasted - along with the world's ugliest lamp he won after being tipped off the number of beans in a jar. But ugly or not, an awful lot of people seem to want to get their hands on that lamp - and they will not let Dan get in their way.
33	Apr 3, 1949	"Tempest in a Casserole"	On an errand to exchange a casserole dish for Suzy, Dan stops by Nick's Place, a restaurant plagued by phony customers preventing real customers getting a table. Very quickly, this seemingly harmless issue turns sinister.
34	Apr 10, 1949	"Mexican Maze"	
35	Apr 17, 1949	"Sealed Instructions"	
36	Apr 24, 1949	"Find Me, Find Death"	Dan receives an anonymous death threat. The note says he will be murdered within four days. Dan must find the writer's identity before he finds Dan.
37	May 1, 1949	"Much Too Lucky"	A bookmaker emplores Box 13 for help after his business gets hit with a series of bizarrely specific large bets, that always win.
38	May 8, 1949	"One of These Four"	Dan and three other strangers are lured to a boat where they are held captive in the middle of the ocean. They're told one of them is a murderer - and they have to figure out who before it is too late.
39	May 15, 1949	"Daytime Nightmare"	Dan responds to an invitation to lunch, and the next thing he knows is waking up in a sanitarium where everyone seems to think he's a man named "Edward Stokes". Dan tries to find a way to convince them to be a terrible case of mistaken identity when everyone thinks he's insane.
40	May 22, 1949	"Death is No Joke"	Alex's household has been plagued with vicious practical jokes that are on a dangerous path of escalation. He writes to his old friend, Dan Holiday, c/o Box 13, to see if he can identify the prankster before someone gets hurt.
41	May 29, 1949	"The Treasure of Hang Li"	Dan is sent on a quest to buy a piece of Jade from an antique shop in chinatown. Little does he know where the jade goes, death and destruction follows.
42	June 5, 1949	"Design for Danger"	The streets of Watertown, a seedy riverside section of the city, are deserted the night Johnny Tide is released from prison. The residents know tonight he will be getting revenge from all the people who got him wrongly sent down. Dan is asked to intervene before the carnage begins.
43	June 12, 1949	"The Dead Man Walks"	
44	June 19, 1949	"Killer at Large"	In a bout of depression, Simon Andrews pays a hired killer to murder him. Only he then changes his mind. Time is running out and it is up to Dan to track down the hitman and convince him the deal is off.
45	June 26, 1949	"Speed To Burn"	Dan goes undercover to help a young lady whose brother is trapped working for a ruthless gang handling stolen vehicles.
46	July 3, 1949	"House of Darkness"	A blind man stumbles upon a plea for help written in braille in a library book. Unable to pursue the mystery himself, he writes to Box 13 for help.
47	July 10, 1949	"Double Trouble"	
48	July 17, 1949	"The Biter Bitten"	Dan receives an urgent letter sending him to a hotel where there is a deadly King Cobra on the loose.
49	July 24, 1949	"A Perfect Crime"	Dr. John Dobbs, a professor of criminology, invites Dan to dinner to discuss his purely hypothetical theory on how to commit the perfect murder.
50	July 31, 1949	"Archimedes and the Roman"	A young boy writes to Dan for help after his mentor, an elderly astrologist who works in a remote observatory on the hills, suddenly goes quiet.
51	Aug 7, 1949	"The Clay Pigeon"	
52	Aug 14, 1949	"Round Robin"	
