= Marvel Zombies 3 =

2008 comic book series

- Variant cover for Marvel Zombies 3 #1. Art by Arthur Suydam

Publication information
- Publisher: Marvel Comics
- Schedule: Monthly
- Format: Mini-series
- Genre
- Publication date: October 2008 – January 2009
- No. of issues: 4
- Main character(s): Machine Man; Jocasta

Creative team
- Written by: Fred Van Lente
- Artist: Kev Walker
- Letterer: Rus Wooton
- Colorist: Jean-Francois Beaulieu
- Editor(s): Lauren Henry; Bill Rosemann; Lauren Sankovitch

Collected editions
- Hardcover: ISBN 0-7851-3635-5

Marvel Zombies 3 is a four-issue American comic book limited series published by Marvel Comics beginning in October 2008. It is part of the Marvel Zombies series. The series is written by Fred Van Lente, penciled by Kev Walker, with covers by Greg Land.

== Plot ==
Zombies invade Earth-616, the original Marvel Universe, by entering through the Nexus of Realities in Florida. Siege, Jennifer Kale, Wundarr and the Conquistador (Juan Ponce de León, who as a Roman Catholic regards his foes as demons), local members of the Fifty-State Initiative, investigate but are attacked by zombie Deadpool and a few zombified civilians. The zombies kill the Conquistador, and infect Siege and Wundarr. A horrified Kale destroys Deadpool's body with an airboat. Siege's robotics detect the biological corruption and he self-terminates. Wundarr goes into hibernation to purge himself. A traumatized Jennifer Kale awaits in an observation room back at headquarters.

Back at A.R.M.O.R., Machine Man and Jocasta travel to the Marvel Zombie universe to find DNA with Little Sky so they can find an uninfected human for Morbius, now an A.R.M.O.R. scientist, to make a vaccine against the zombie plague so the 616 heroes can be inoculated against the virus. While the heroes are gone, it is revealed that Morbius is the zombie version, who has kidnapped the real one.

The two heroes find that "human" readings are really coming from clones generated by the zombie Kingpin, via his resources and created by the zombie Jackal, now used as the zombies' sole food source under Kingpin's control. As they watch, the zombified Inhumans arrive and are welcomed by Kingpin (who tells the now prolix Black Bolt to shut up).

Machine Man and Jocasta stumble upon Vanessa Fisk, who is uninfected. She tells them that the Kingpin is keeping her safe. She allows Jocasta to get a blood sample, but declines an offer to escape to Earth-616, preferring to stay behind with her husband. Looking at the dead and dying bodies in the pit, Machine Man is overcome with pity, realizing that the zombies are treating the clones the way humans treat robots. He leaves Jocasta, goes into battle mode and destroys the clones out of mercy and gets attacked by the zombies, as he has destroyed their food source.

A severely injured and sessile zombie Doctor Strange appears in the plot line; has only the powers to create manna (ironically inedible for the zombies) and to see other dimensions. He thus reveals A.R.M.O.R.'s operations on Earth-616. Machine Man sees that the impostor Morbius used Deadpool to create a distraction so that he could set his plans in motion.

In the real Marvel Universe, a female team member finds the real Morbius captive. The infected version attacks and turns her, causing a zombie outbreak that quickly overtakes the entire facility. Little Sky returns Jocasta to A.R.M.O.R. without Machine Man, who did not meet them on time; Jocasta requests that Machine Man be given posthumous honors. Jocasta discovers Morbius is a zombie, and one zombie uses the A.R.M.O.R. teleporters to escape this reality.

In the zombie universe, Machine Man defeats the zombies, leaving only zombie Lockjaw, whom Machine Man uses to teleport back to A.R.M.O.R., where he kills the zombies. (Immediately thereafter he queries Jocasta about having some "...sweet, sweet robot love" in a secluded spot, whereupon they kiss.)

The real Morbius kills his zombie counterpart and escapes. Jocasta and Machine Man return to S.H.I.E.L.D., and Morbius volunteers to follow the zombie that teleported away, along with a new team of Midnight Sons.

== Sequel ==
The end of the final issue sets-up the next part of the Marvel Zombies saga Marvel Zombies 4: Midnight Sons.

== Covers ==
Unlike the prior Marvel Zombies series covers, which were zombie variations of past Marvel comics covers, Marvel Zombies 3 covers are variants of well-known movie posters. Art by Greg Land.

- Issue #1 is a reference to the Army of Darkness movie poster.
- Issue #2 is a reference to the 28 Days Later movie poster.
- Issue #3 is a reference to The Evil Dead movie poster.
- Issue #4 is a reference to the US Shaun of the Dead movie poster.

The variant cover for issue #1 is an Arthur Suydam Zombie version of Machine Man #1, originally by Jack Kirby.

The second printing of #1 features a variant cover by Kev Walker, using story art from the issue.

== Reception ==
Paukolo reviewed the first issue for Comics Bulletin and was happy with the story although he knocked off half a point for the ending. The writing is "briskly paced, humorous, and loaded with references that makes me think we read the same comics growing up" according to McCoy, who said it measures up well against its predecessors, suggesting that it is "rough-hewn and hearkens back to Philips' work on the previous series, but lacks the detailed gore of those stories". Timothy Callahan at Comic Book Resources agrees, stating that Van Lente's writing "balances the sick humor with an engaging plot, providing a few twists and turns in just a single issue" and Walker's contribution is "streamlined an effective, with a kind of blocky Steve Dillon vibe."

== Collected editions ==
The series has been collected into an individual volume:

- Marvel Zombies 3 (104 pages, hardcover, May 2009, ISBN 0-7851-3635-5, softcover, December 2009, ISBN 0-7851-3526-X)

== See also ==
- Marvel Zombies
- Marvel Zombies 2
- Marvel Zombies vs. The Army of Darkness
- Marvel Apes
