= Marvel Zombies 4 =

2009 Marvel comic book limited series

- Cover of Marvel Zombies 4 #1

Publication information
- Publisher: Marvel Comics
- Schedule: Monthly
- Format: Mini-series
- Genre: Superhero
- Publication date: June – September 2009
- No. of issues: 4
- Main character(s): Midnight Sons; The Hood

Creative team
- Written by: Fred Van Lente
- Artist: Kev Walker
- Letterer: Rus Wooton
- Colorist: Jean-Francois Beaulieu
- Editor(s): Michael Horwitz; Bill Rosemann; Ralph Macchio

Collected editions
- Hardcover: ISBN 0-7851-3917-6

Marvel Zombies 4 is a four-issue American comic book limited series published by Marvel Comics beginning in April 2009. It is part of the Marvel Zombies series. The series is written by Fred Van Lente, penciled by Kev Walker, with covers by Greg Land.

== Plot ==
The new Midnight Sons, Morbius, the Living Vampire, Werewolf by Night, Daimon Hellstrom, Jennifer Kale and the Man-Thing, each (except for Man-Thing) inoculated with a zombie virus vaccine created by Morbius, investigate a cruise ship being attacked by zombie Fishmen. As the Sons destroy the zombies, Morbius reveals that he has genetically engineered an oxidizing bacteria that causes the zombies to explode. The group kills them all only to confront zombie Piranha.

Zombie Deadpool's head and Simon Garth are revealed to have been the cause of the new zombies by teleporting from A.R.M.O.R. headquarters during Marvel Zombies 3, entering the ocean floor, and having Deadpool's head infect all of the Men-Fish. Garth finds Black Talon and tells him about the zombie plague. Black Talon assumes control of Garth and captures Deadpool's head. Black Talon calls the Hood, offering the zombie plague as a weapon to destroy all superheroes.

The cruise ship containing the zombified Men-Fish runs aground on Taino, home of Black Talon. Kale teleports the Midnight Sons to the island, as Hellstrom destroys the ship by igniting the engines. Meanwhile, the Hood confers with his cohorts as Dormammu mentally commands the Hood to get the virus. The Hood goes to the Black Talon's plantation on Taino, with the some of his henchmen. Dormammu warns the Hood that the Midnight Sons are approaching, so he sends the some of his men after the Sons. During a battle against some of zombie Deadpool's creations, Garth escapes with the head. Morbius attacks the zombies with his explosive vaccine, but it mutates into something deadlier, killing Hood's henchmen. Dormammu answers Kale's call for help by offering her great power.

Jennifer rejects Dormammu and summons Man-Thing. The Hood, captured by The Midnight Sons, decides to side with them for help. Morbius' killer vaccine cloud begins to kill an entire village with rain. Simon and Zombie Deadpool walk through the killer rain as Man-Thing follows them healing the rain damage because of his Earth connection healing. Zombie Deadpool realizes he can control the vaccine cloud and creates a super-zombie out of dead bodies. After a fight, the "super-zombie" kills Man-Thing by lifting him off the ground and letting the rain destroy him. As Jennifer mourns his death and leaves Morbius, Hellstrom and The Hood, thinking of a way to escape as the Hood's henchmen, return zombified. Jack Russell confronts Kale, revealing that the vaccine has zombified him, which leaves Kale screaming Dormammu's name. As Morbius is about to call in a nuclear strike, Kale shows up, empowered with Dormammu's new gifts.

After this, Kale attacks the Midnight Sons along with Hood's henchman zombies. Daimon exorcizes Kale's powers and she defeats the other zombies. She then uses her magic to make moonlight appear so Jack becomes his Werewolf form, which the zombie virus cannot affect. Morbius tells Black Talon that he and Kale need to combine their magic to contain the Zombie Plague cloud into a single host, Simon Garth. The Midnight Sons decide to fight other monsters now that the zombie plague is seemingly over. However, zombie Deadpool's head is floating in the sea still alive; it resurfaces in Deadpool: Merc with a Mouth.

== Collected editions ==
The series has been collected into a single volume:

- Marvel Zombies 4 (112 pages, hardcover, November 2009, ISBN 0-7851-3917-6, softcover, April 2010, ISBN 0-7851-3918-4)
