= Action Philosophers! =

Cover to Action Philosophers: Giant Size Thing 1

Action Philosophers! was a self-published comic book series by artist Ryan Dunlavey and writer Fred Van Lente, which was awarded a Xeric Grant in 2004, leading to Action Philosophers! # 1's publication in April 2005.

The series focused on a concise biography of some of the most notable philosophers and their ideas. To quote the book's homepage:

ACTION PHILOSOPHERS! is a comic book series detailing the lives and thoughts of history's A-list brain trust in a hip and humorous way that proves that philosophy is not just the province of boring tweed-enveloped college professors.

The original black and white comic book series concluded with issue # 9, published in September 2007. The series was collected into three self-published paperback "Giant Size" collections. Dark Horse Comics published a deluxe hardcover collection of the black and white series with new material in October, 2014, for the 10th anniversary.

The series began to be released in full color with corrected, updated, and all new material on Kickstarter starting in 2021.

The first campaign was created by Evil Twin Comics in 2021 and was for Action Philosophers Vol 1: Hooked on Classics (The Pre-Socratics, Plato, Aristotle, Diogenes, Epicurus, Epictetus, Laozi, Bodhidharma, Rumi, The Kabbalah, Confucius, Augustine of Hippo, Hypatia, Thomas Aquinas).

The second campaign was created by Rocketship Entertainment in 2023 for book two Action Philosophers: Omnipotence For Dummies (Francis Bacon, René Descartes, Immanuel Kant, Mary Shelley, Søren Kierkegaard, Baruch Spinoza, Gottfried Wilhelm Leibniz, Jean-Jacques Rosseau, Thomas Jefferson, David Hume, George Berkeley, Georg Hegel, Arthur Schopenhauer, Auguste Comte, Niccolò Machiavelli, Thomas Hobbes).

The third campaign was created by Rocketship Entertainment in 2026 for book three, Action Philosophers: Modernity Bites (Karl Marx, John Stuart Mill, Jacques Derrida, Hannah Arendt, Friedrich Nietzsche, Jean-Paul Sartre, Ayn Rand, Sigmund Freud).

Coloring for all three books was done by Adam Guzowski.

The official Action Philosophers website was launched in 2024 to serialize the colored comics.

== Reception ==
The American Library Association included Action Philosophers vol. 1 in its 2007 Great Graphic Novels for Teens booklist. The series was nominated for a 2007 Ignatz Outstanding Debut Award and received positive reviews from Philosophy Now and Comics Worth Reading.. Action Philosophers: Omnipotence for Dummies was a finalist for the 2025 Ringo Awards "Best Humor Comic."

Action Philosophers was used as a model for developing the New York City Department of Education WeTeachNYC resource Action Activists #1 to teach students about government systems and participatory democracy.

== Issue summary ==
- # 1: - Nietzsche, Bodhidharma, & Plato: "Wrestling Superstar of Ancient Greece!", featuring one of the series' most famous lines, "PLATO SMASH!"
- # 2: - The "All Sex Special", featuring Ayn Rand, Thomas Jefferson, & Saint Augustine.
- # 3: - "Self Help for Stupid Ugly Losers" featuring Sigmund Freud, Carl Jung, & Joseph Campbell.
- # 4: - "World Domination Handbook" featuring Karl Marx, Niccolò Machiavelli, & The Kabbalah.
- # 5: - "Hate the French" featuring René Descartes, Jean-Paul Sartre, & Jacques Derrida.
- # 6: - "The People's Choice" featuring Soren Kierkegaard, St. Thomas Aquinas, & Ludwig Wittgenstein.
- # 7: - "It's all Greek to you" featuring The Pre-Socratics, Aristotle, & Epictetus.
- # 8: - "Senseless Violence Special" featuring Kant, Schopenhauer, Hegel, & John Stuart Mill.
- # 9: - "The Lightning Round", the final issue featuring Diogenes the Cynic, Lao Tzu, Michel Foucault, David Hume, Confucius, George Berkeley, Francis Bacon, Jean-Jacques Rousseau, Thomas Hobbes, Mary Wollstonecraft, Baruch Spinoza and Gottfried Leibniz.

== Collected editions ==
Title	Material collected	ISBN
Action Philosophers! Giant-size Thing 1	Action Philosophers #1-3	ISBN 0-9778329-0-2
Action Philosophers! Giant-size Thing 2	Action Philosophers #4-6	ISBN 0-9778329-1-0
Action Philosophers! Giant-size Thing 3	Action Philosophers #7-9	ISBN 0-9778329-2-9
The More Than Complete Action Philosophers!	Action Philosophers #1-9, plus new content	ISBN 978-0-9778329-3-4
Action Philosophers!	Published by Dark Horse Comics, reprints "More Than Complete…", with a new story and historical material, hardcover format	ISBN 978-1-61655-539-9
Action Philosophers Vol 1: Hooked on Classics!	Published on Kickstarter created by Evil Twin Comics, reprints previous editions in color with corrections, updates, and new material. Volume 1 of 3 planned volumes	ISBN 978-1952126710
Action Philosophers: Omnipotence For Dummies!	Published on Kickstarter created by Rocketship Entertainment, reprints previous editions in color with corrections, updates, and new material. Volume 2 of 3 planned volumes	ISBN 978-1962298131
Action Philosophers: Modernity Bites!	Published on Kickstarter created by Rocketship Entertainment, reprints previous editions in color with corrections, updates, and new material. Volume 3 of 3 planned volumes	
