= The Inspectre =

Character information
- Created by: Kev Walker; Jim Campbell

In-story information
- Full name: Inspectre Viktor Zadek
- Abilities: Telepathy

Publication information
- Publisher: Originally IPC Media (Fleetway) until 1999, thereafter Rebellion Developments
- Schedule: Monthly
Title(s)
Judge Dredd Megazine
- Genre: Science fiction
- Publication date: November 1996 – September 1997

Creative team
- Writer(s): Kev Walker; Jim Campbell
- Artist(s): Kev Walker; Charlie Gillespie; Andrew Currie
- Editor(s): Tharg (David Bishop)

The Inspectre is a science fiction comic, created by Kev Walker and letterer Jim Campbell, which appeared in the British Judge Dredd Megazine between 1996 and 1997. The series takes place in the same fictional world as Judge Dredd.

== Development and description ==
The original idea was Walker's, who wanted to create and write a character of his own from scratch. The series is a rare foray into writing for both Kev Walker and Jim Campbell although the pair also co-wrote the Warhammer 40,000 series Daemonifuge. Both creators are positive about their experience creating and writing the series. Campbell is credited as the writer of the third and fourth stories.

The series follows on from events in the Judge Dredd stories "Block Mania" and "The Apocalypse War". Inspectre Vicktor Zadek, a powerful psychic judge, is imprisoned in a gulag for opposing Marshall Kazan's regime. The gulag is so isolated from the outside world that the end of the war goes unnoticed. When East-Meg Two attempts to rebuild the devastated East-Meg One they retrieve Zadek to help deal with the ghosts of those killed in the destruction of the city. In the attempt to get Zadek from the gulag the entire population of prisoners is killed by the sadistic warden Eva Primakova and only Zadek is left alive. The dead prisoners resurrect and take their revenge on Primakova but her spirit goes on to haunt Zadek. Once rescued and redeployed the Inspectre is given mechanical brain implants to control his sensitivity to psychic phenomena.

== Publications ==
- "Requiem" (in Judge Dredd Megazine, #3.23-3.25, 1996/97)
- "Baptism of Fire" (art by Charlie Gillespie, in Judge Dredd Megazine, #3.26-3.27, 1997)
- "Damn'd Spirits All" (art by Charlie Gillespie, in Judge Dredd Megazine, #3.28-3.29, 1997)
- "Trial By Fury" (art by Andrew Currie, in Judge Dredd Megazine, #3.30-3.33, 1997)
