= Aberrant: Year One =

Aberrant: Year One is a 1999 role-playing game supplement for Aberrant published by White Wolf Publishing.

== Contents ==
Aberrant: Year One is a supplement in which the Aberrant world is detailed from the perspective of the year 2008.

== Reception ==
Aberrant: Year One was reviewed in the online second version of Pyramid which said "I've been very impressed with Aberrant's initial releases to date. They've been well written and interesting, providing plenty of ideas for my own games. That's why I've recommended the game so wholeheartedly to friends and colleagues. So, it's with some disappointment that I must report that Aberrant: Year One is a weak supplement -- although not entirely devoid of virtues."

== Reviews ==
- Backstab #19
