= Steve Ellis (comics) =

American comic book artist and illustrator

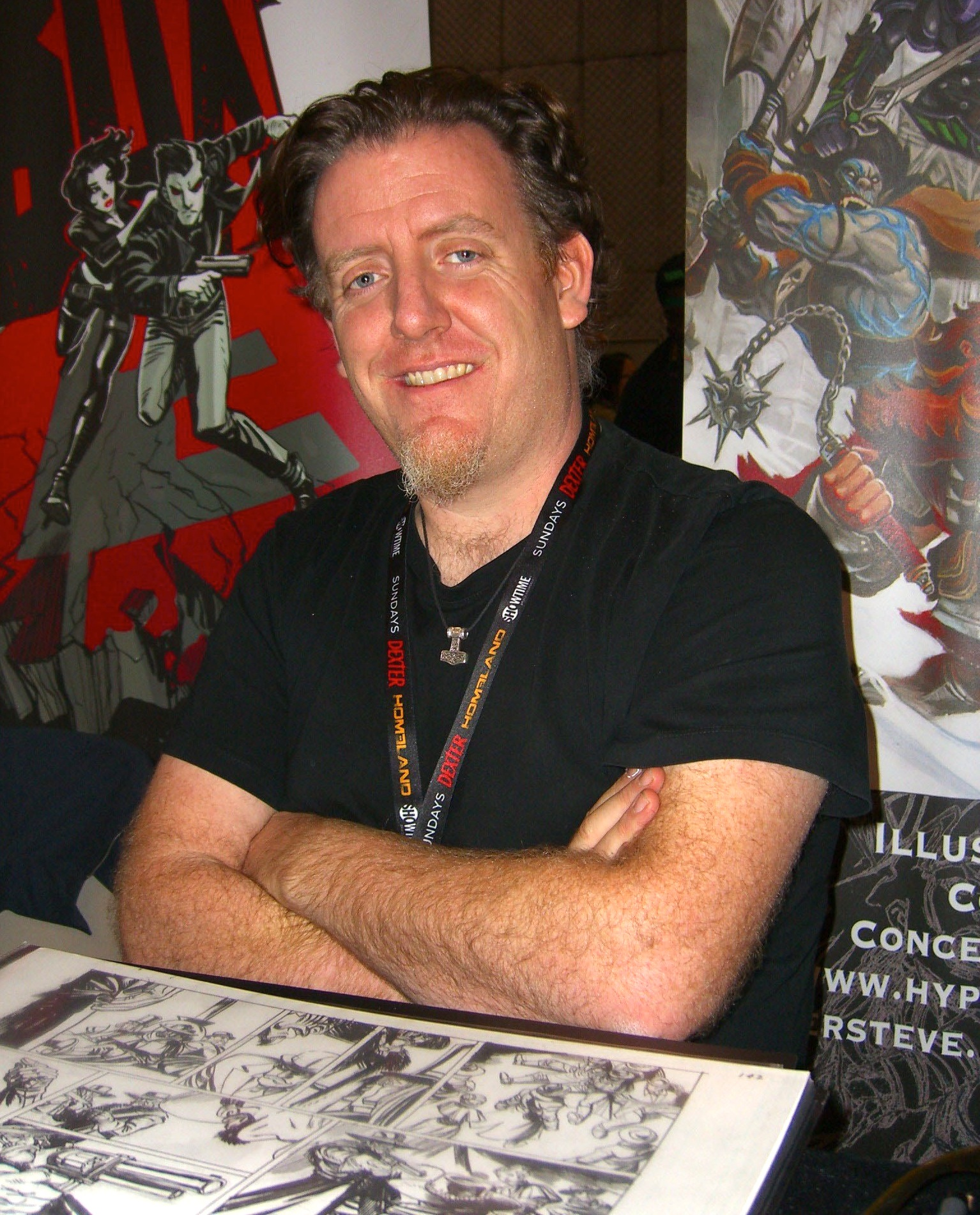
- Ellis at the 2011 New York Comic Con
- Areas: Artist, Inker
- Notable works: High Moon; The Silencers; Crimson Dynamo
- Awards: Harvey Award, 2009; Paper Screen Gem Award; Galerie d'art Yves Laroche: Street Camp Juried Show 2006; Best in Show: Gen Con Art Show 2005

Steve Ellis is an American comic book artist and illustrator who has worked for Wizards of the Coast, DC Comics, Wildstorm, White Wolf, Moonstone Books and Marvel Comics.

== Career ==
=== Early career and comics illustration ===
Ellis graduated from Syracuse University, where he studied fine art and illustration. During his undergraduate years, he contributed comic strips to the university's student newspaper, The Daily Orange. Following graduation, he submitted samples of his artwork to major comic-book publishers and received an assignment illustrating Iron Man for Marvel Comics.

Ellis subsequently established a career as a penciller, inker, and illustrator, working for Marvel Comics, DC Comics, WildStorm, Valiant Comics, and other publishers. His early credits included Iron Man, Spider-Woman, Lobo, and Ninjak.

In 2001, Ellis illustrated Jezebelle, a six-issue miniseries written by Ben Raab and published by WildStorm. In 2003, he illustrated Crimson Dynamo, a Marvel Comics miniseries written by John Jackson Miller. Ellis contributed pencilling, inking, and cover artwork to the series.

=== Creator-owned comics and The Silencers ===
Ellis developed creator-owned projects alongside his work for established publishers. His early independent comics included the science-fiction series Tranquility.

He collaborated with writer Fred Van Lente on The Silencers, a superhero crime series about superpowered enforcers working for organized crime. The project combined conventions of superhero fiction with crime and gangster storytelling.

Van Lente later identified The Silencers as an important early project in his career, explaining that the collaboration with Ellis helped attract professional attention from Marvel Comics. The series was subsequently collected by Dark Horse Comics as The Complete Silencers in 2014.

=== Fantasy illustration and tabletop games ===
Outside traditional comic-book publishing, Ellis developed a career as a fantasy illustrator and concept artist. His work has appeared in role-playing game sourcebooks, trading card games, books, and other illustrated entertainment products.

His clients have included Wizards of the Coast, White Wolf Publishing, Upper Deck, Blizzard Entertainment, Hasbro, and other gaming and entertainment companies.

For Wizards of the Coast, Ellis contributed interior illustrations to several Dungeons & Dragons sourcebooks during the game's third-edition era. These included Libris Mortis (2004), Frostburn (2004), Complete Adventurer (2005), Lords of Madness (2005), and Player's Handbook II (2006).

Ellis has also illustrated cards for Magic: The Gathering, beginning with work associated with the game's Planar Chaos era. His fantasy artwork has appeared across multiple card sets and reprint products.

=== High Moon and digital comics ===
In 2007, Ellis and writer David Gallaher co-created High Moon, a supernatural Western webcomic combining horror, historical fiction, and traditional Western storytelling. The series was lettered by Scott O. Brown.

High Moon won the inaugural monthly competition of Zuda Comics, a digital-comics initiative operated by DC Comics. Its original horizontal format was designed for screen-based reading.

The series received the 2009 Harvey Award for Best Online Comics Work, shared by Ellis, Gallaher, and Brown. Following its digital serialization, High Moon was collected in print by DC Comics. In 2017, the Super Genius imprint of Papercutz began publishing remastered editions, with plans for additional material concluding the story.

In 2017, the National Endowment for the Arts featured Ellis and Gallaher in an interview examining their collaborative process, visual storytelling, and the development of High Moon. Ellis discussed the relationship between illustration and dialogue, as well as his approach to integrating visual composition with narrative structure.

=== Box 13 and mobile comics ===
In 2009, Ellis and Gallaher created Box 13, a psychological thriller commissioned by ComiXology as its first original comic.

The series was developed for reading on Apple's iPhone and debuted on October 13, 2009. It was serialized in 13 weekly installments, using a presentation adapted to smartphone screens.

The project was among the early original professional comics produced for mobile distribution rather than converted from existing print editions.

Ellis and Gallaher subsequently continued the property with Box 13: The Pandora Process.

=== The Only Living Boy and The Only Living Girl ===
Ellis and Gallaher continued their creative partnership through Bottled Lightning, producing original comics and graphic novels for digital and print distribution.

Their fantasy adventure series The Only Living Boy follows Erik Farrell, a runaway who finds himself in a world populated by unfamiliar creatures, civilizations, and competing factions.

The project received support through a Kickstarter campaign in 2012. In March 2014, Ellis and Gallaher began distributing the series as a free webcomic, expanding its availability beyond the traditional comics retail market.

In interviews, Ellis described developing the series' visual style around the energy and accessibility of animated adventure films. He contrasted its cleaner linework and color presentation with the darker, more heavily textured approach used in High Moon.

Papercutz began publishing The Only Living Boy in graphic novel form in 2016. The series eventually comprised five collected volumes and an omnibus edition.

The work received Harvey Award nominations, including nominations for Best Original Graphic Publication for Younger Readers in 2014 and 2016. Ellis also received individual Harvey nominations for his inking and cover artwork on the series.

In 2018, Papercutz announced The Only Living Girl, a companion series by Ellis and Gallaher set in the same fictional universe. The series began publication in 2019.

In 2019, Ellis received a Ringo Award nomination for Best Artist or Penciller. The Only Living Boy Omnibus also received a nomination for Best Presentation in Design.

=== Return to Marvel and DC Comics ===
Following the success of High Moon, Ellis and Gallaher collaborated on several projects for Marvel Comics.

Their Marvel work included Hulk: Winter Guard (2009) and the three-issue Darkstar and the Winter Guard miniseries (2010). Ellis provided pencilling, inking, and coloring for Hulk: Winter Guard.

In 2015, Ellis illustrated the two-issue Convergence: Green Lantern Corps miniseries as part of DC Comics' Convergence publishing event.

The series was written by Gallaher, with artwork by Ellis and Ande Parks. The story featured Hal Jordan, John Stewart, and Guy Gardner.

=== Television and interactive entertainment ===
Ellis has also contributed illustration, concept art, and visual storytelling to projects associated with television and interactive entertainment.

He worked with AMC on digital projects connected to Breaking Bad, The Walking Dead, Better Call Saul, and Turn: Washington's Spies.

His projects included the interactive comics-style games Breaking Bad: The Interrogation, The Walking Dead: Dead Reckoning, and Breaking Bad: The Cost of Doing Business.

Ellis also illustrated online comics associated with Breaking Bad and Better Call Saul. These projects involved adapting established television characters and settings into sequential artwork and interactive formats.

Ellis has described collaborating with writers, designers, and programmers on the development of interactive visual narratives, including character designs, game interfaces, and storyboards.

=== Teaching and later work ===
Ellis has taught drawing, illustration, comics, digital art, and visual storytelling at Syracuse University, where he began teaching in 2004.

His teaching has included undergraduate and graduate instruction in illustration, concept development, design, and sequential storytelling.

Alongside teaching, Ellis has continued to work as a freelance illustrator, concept artist, and comics creator. His professional portfolio includes artwork for publishers, entertainment companies, role-playing games, and trading card products.

His more recent independent work includes the development of Thornclaw Manor, a fantasy story centered on a young girl searching for her missing family in a world inhabited by creatures drawn from myth and folklore.

== Affiliations ==
Ellis has been a member of the Society of Illustrators since 2000.

Ellis was associated with DrawBridge, a Brooklyn-based collective of comics artists and illustrators whose collaborative studio and sketchblog included members of Hypothetical Island Studios.

== Awards and nominations ==
Year	Award	Category	Work or recipient	Result
2009	Harvey Award	Best Online Comics Work	High Moon — Steve Ellis, David Gallaher, and Scott O. Brown	Won
2009	Harvey Award	Best New Series	High Moon	Nominated
2010	Harvey Award	Best Online Comics Work	High Moon — Steve Ellis, David Gallaher, and Scott O. Brown	Nominated
2010	Harvey Award	Best Inker	Steve Ellis — High Moon	Nominated
2011	Harvey Award	Best Inker	Steve Ellis — Box 13	Nominated
2013	Harvey Award	Best Inker	Steve Ellis — The Only Living Boy	Nominated
2013	Harvey Award	Best Cover Artist	Steve Ellis — The Only Living Boy	Nominated
2014	Harvey Award	Best Original Graphic Publication for Younger Readers	The Only Living Boy — Steve Ellis and David Gallaher	Nominated
2016	Harvey Award	Best Original Graphic Publication for Younger Readers	The Only Living Boy — Steve Ellis and David Gallaher	Nominated
2019	Ringo Award	Best Artist or Penciller	Steve Ellis	Nominated
2019	Ringo Award	Best Presentation in Design	The Only Living Boy Omnibus — Papercutz	Nominated

== Selected Works ==
=== Acclaim Comics ===
- H.A.R.D. Corps
- Ninjak

=== Amazon Studios ===
- It Came in the Mail (storyboards)

=== AMC ===
- Turn
- Breaking Bad: The Cost of Doing Business
- Breaking Bad: All Bad Things
- Better Call Saul: Client Development

=== Archaia ===
- Immortals: Gods & Heroes

=== Bottled Lightning ===
- The Only Living Boy (artist and co-creator, with writer David Gallaher)
- The Only Living Girl (artist and co-creator, with David Gallaher)

=== ComiXology ===
- Box 13 (artist and co-creator, with David Gallaher)
- Box 13: The Pandora Process (artist and co-creator, with David Gallaher)

=== Dark Horse Comics ===
- The Complete Silencers

=== DC Comics ===
- High Moon (Zuda Comics; artist and co-creator, with David Gallaher and Scott O. Brown)
- Green Lantern
- Green Lantern Corps
- Hawkman
- Lobo

=== DreamSmith Books Publishers ===
- Tranquility (artist, co-creator, and co-writer)

=== Image Comics ===
- Deadlands: The Devil's Six Gun (with David Gallaher)

=== Marvel Comics ===
- Iron Man
- Spider-Woman
- Crimson Dynamo (with John Jackson Miller)
- All-New Official Handbook of the Marvel Universe A to Z: Update (2007)
- Darkhawk
- Hulk: Winter Guard
- Darkstar and the Winter Guard

=== Moonstone Books ===
- Werewolf: The Apocalypse: Bone Gnawers — Scavenger Hunt: Project Reaper
- Werewolf: The Apocalypse — Fianna
- The Silencers

=== Scholastic Books ===
- Confessions of a Teenage Vampire (artist and co-creator)

=== White Wolf ===
- Aberrant: Elites
- Aberrant Players Guide
- Aberrant: The Directive
- Aberrant Worldwide: Phase I
- Aberrant: Year One
- Changeling: The Dreaming — The Fool's Luck: The Way of the Commoner
- Changeling: The Dreaming — Land of Eight Million Dreams
- Demon: The Fallen — Demon Storytellers Companion
- Demon: The Fallen Rulebook
- Hunter: The Reckoning — Hunter Book: Avenger
- Hunter: The Reckoning — Hunter Book: Defender
- Hunter Survival Guide
- Kindred of the East — Killing Streets
- Mage: The Ascension — Guide to the Technocracy
- Mage: The Ascension Revised Edition
- Vampire: The Masquerade — Clanbook: Ventrue Revised
- Werewolf: The Apocalypse — Apocalypse
- Werewolf: The Apocalypse Revised Edition
- World of Darkness: Time of Judgment

=== WildStorm ===
- Jezebelle (with co-creator Ben Raab)
- Gen¹³
