= David Gallaher =

American comics writer and video game narrative designer

- Gallaher in Paris, 2025
- Born: David Matthew Gallaher; June 5, 1975 (age 51)
- Education: Hood College; Goddard College (MFA)
- Occupations: Comics writer, editor, video game writer, narrative designer
- Years active: 1998–present
- Known for: High Moon; Box 13; The Only Living Boy; Tom Clancy's Ghost Recon Wildlands; Tom Clancy's Ghost Recon Breakpoint
- Awards: Harvey Award for Best Online Comics Work (2009)

David Matthew Gallaher is an American comics writer, narrative director, and video game designer. He is known for his contributions to early digital-comics publishing, particularly High Moon (2007) and Box 13 (2009), both co-created with Steve Ellis (comics), and the graphic novel series The Only Living Boy and The Only Living Girl.

Gallaher, Ellis, and letterer Scott O. Brown won the 2009 Harvey Award for Best Online Comics Work for High Moon. His comics credits include work for Marvel Comics, DC Comics, Archie Comics, and other publishers. His video game credits include Ubisoft's Tom Clancy's Ghost Recon: Breakpoint (2019) and Flint: Treasure of Oblivion (2024).

Gallaher has been identified in comics-industry publications as an early innovator in digital publishing, specifically through his work with Marvel Interactive, DC Comics' Zuda Comics initiative, and ComiXology. His later career has included narrative development for AAA+ games, professional mentorship, education, and industry community building.

== Early life ==
Gallaher attended Hood College in Maryland, studying neuroscience and education. He subsequently earned a Master of Fine Arts from Goddard College, where he focused on comics. His master's thesis examined the use of comics to help children with developmental disabilities learn to read.

Before entering the comics industry, Gallaher taught special education. His graduate thesis examined how comics could help children with developmental challenges improve their reading comprehension.

During his final term at Goddard College, Gallaher illustrated his résumé in the style of Scott McCloud's Understanding Comics as a six-panel Comics' strip and faxed it to Marvel Comics. The submission received a positive response from Marvel's John Cerilli, leading to an internship with the company's interactive division.

== Comics Career ==
Marvel Interactive and early digital comics

Gallaher subsequently relocated to New York City and began working on digital story projects for Iron Man, Captain America, Spider-Man, and the X-Men.

His work included developing assets for Marvel's early digital comics programs, including Marvel CyberComics and "Excelsior Theatre," which explored how comic-book storytelling could be adapted to web browsers, computer displays, video games, and other interactive formats. These projects experimented with animation, sound, transitions, and interactive presentation during the early development of web-based comics.

Following his internship, Gallaher continued freelancing for Marvel for more than three years and subsequently contributed writing and creative services to other publishers including Moonstone Books.

High Moon and DC Comics

In 2007, Gallaher and artist Steve Ellis created High Moon, a supernatural western, combining horror, mystery, and historical fiction.

The series follows a mysterious bounty hunter investigating supernatural events in the American West. Its fictional mythology draws on werewolves, historical legends, and the conflict between civilization and savagery.

High Moon won the inaugural monthly competition of DC Comics publishing initiative in 2007.

The comic was develop in a horizontal format intended for computer-screen reading, distinguishing its original presentation from conventional printed comic books.

The series gained recognition with the Comics' industry and received the 2009 Harvey Award for Best Online Comics Work, shared by Gallaher, Ellis, and letterer Scott O. Brown. It also received a Harvey nomination in 2010.

DC Comics published High Moon in print in 2009. In 2017, Papercutz's Super Genius imprint began releasing remastered editions including new material intended to conclude the series.

In November 2017, the National Endowment for the Arts featured Gallaher and Ellis in an extended interview about their collaboration and the artistic possibilities of comics.

Box 13 and mobile comics innovation

In 2009, Gallaher and Ellis created Box 13, a psychological thriller inspired by the classic radio drama of the same name. The project was commissioned by Comixology as its first original comic. It debuted on October 13, 2009, with a serialization of 13 weekly installments developed for reading on Apple Inc.'s iPhone.

The series was among the early original professional comics designed specifically for smartphone distribution rather than adapted from existing printed editions.

The work subsequently received a print release through Red 5 Comics. Gallaher and Ellis also continued the property with Box 13: The Pandora Process.

The Only Living Boy and creator-owned publishing

Gallaher and Ellis continued their collaboration through Bottled Lightning, a creative studio devoted to original comics and other storytelling projects.

Their science-fiction fantasy series The Only Living Boy followed Erik Farrell, a runaway who finds himself in a unfamiliar world populated by extraordinary creatures, civilizations, and competing factions. The series incorporated adventure fiction, science fiction, fantasy, and coming-of-age storytelling.

The series began as a crowdfunded project in 2012, raising $16,070 from 437 backers through Kickstarter. The series subsequently launched as a free webcomic in March of 2014.

The Only Living Boy received a 2014 Harvey Award nomination for Best Original Graphic Publication for Younger Readers, followed by another nomination in the same category in 2016.

Papercutz began publishing the series in graphic novel form in 2016, eventually releasing five volumes and an omnibus collection in 2018.

In a 2016 essay for io9, Gallaher discussed the personal experiences that informed the work, particularly his experiences with epilepsy, memory loss, and identity.

In 2018, Papercutz announced The Only Living Girl, a companion series by Gallaher and Ellis set within the same fictional universe. Publication began in 2019.

=== Work for Marvel, DC, and other publishers ===
Alongside his creator-owned projects, Gallaher has contributed writing to several established comic-book franchises.

His Marvel Comics work includes Hulk: Winter Guard (2009) and the three-issue miniseries Darkstar and the Winter Guard (2010), both created with artist Steve Ellis. His earlier work at Marvel Interactive also included digital projects featuring Spider-Man and Iron Man.

In 2015, he wrote the two-issue Convergence: Green Lantern Corps series for DC Comics, illustrated by Ellis. The story featured Hal Jordan, John Stewart, and Guy Gardner during DC's Convergence publishing event.

His other published work includes Deadlands: The Devil's Six-Gun for Image Comics, Vampire: The Masquerade and Yours Truly, Johnny Dollar for Moonstone Books, and The Mighty Crusaders: The Shield (2021) for Archie Comics.

Gallaher has also worked as a consulting editor on English-language manga publications associated with Kodansha. His editorial work included titles such as Sailor Moon, Attack on Titan, and Fairy Tail. A 2017 Long Beach Comic Expo program identified him as a consulting editor on all three properties.

In a 2025 essay, Gallaher described collaborating with translators, designers, and Kodansha editorial staff to prepare Japanese comics for English-speaking readers.

== Games Career ==
=== Video game development ===
Gallaher subsequently expanded his career into video game writing, narrative design, and creative consultation.

His work includes writing contributions to Ubisoft's Tom Clancy's Ghost Recon franchise, including Tom Clancy's Ghost Recon Wildlands (2017) and Tom Clancy's Ghost Recon Breakpoint (2019). Both credits are documented in his professional biography published by Taliespin.

Ghost Recon Breakpoint is an open-world tactical shooter developed by Ubisoft Paris and published by Ubisoft.

Gallaher is listed among the game's writing contributors alongside Emil Daubon, Jesse Gustafson, Ajani Jackson, Will Welles, and Nic Yulo. The game's credits also identify Lewis Manalo and Kurt McClung as lead writers.

He subsequently worked with Taliespin, a writing and narrative development studio founded in 2012 by Kurt McClung and Simon Mackenzie. The company provides services including narrative writing, worldbuilding, script development, and localization for video games and other entertainment properties.

His work at Taliespin has involved narrative development, writing, editorial consultation, and collaboration with multidisciplinary development teams.

Gallaher is credited as a preproduction writer on Flint: Treasure of Oblivion (2024), developed by Savage Level and published by Microids. The game's credits identify him as part of Taliespin's preproduction narrative team, alongside narrative producer Marie-Sophie Gandy and narrative designers Kallie Frances and Kurt McClung.

In a December 2025 retrospective, Gallaher stated that he contributed writing to Warborne: Above Ashes (2025), a multiplayer online game developed by Qooland Games, in collaboration with his Taliespin colleagues.

== Personal Life ==
Gallaher has publicly discussed living with temporal lobe epilepsy and the effects of craniosynostosis, a congenital cranial condition for which he underwent corrective surgery during childhood.

In his March 2016 io9 essay, "How a Brush With Death Inspired The Only Living Boy", Gallaher described how his experiences with epilepsy, hospitalization, and memory loss influenced his writing. He connected these experiences to the themes of identity, isolation, and recovery explored through Erik Farrell, the protagonist of The Only Living Boy.

=== Intervention in Brooklyn assault ===
In March 2022, Gallaher received national media attention after intervening in an assault on a 13-year-old girl in Brooklyn, New York.

According to reporting by Inside Edition and ComicBook.com, Gallaher witnessed a group of teenagers assaulting the girl and confronted them in an attempt to stop the attack. The assailants subsequently turned on Gallaher, punching him and throwing objects, including a garbage can and a large rock.

Gallaher suffered a fractured cheekbone and kidney damage during the confrontation. Surveillance footage captured portions of the assault, and a 16-year-old suspect was subsequently arrested.

In interviews following the incident, Gallaher discussed the influence of superhero characters, including Superman, Captain America, and The Shield, on his decision to intervene. Despite his injuries, he stated that he would intervene again under similar circumstances.

== Reception and acclaim ==
Gallaher's work has received attention for its contribution to digital comics. In a 2012 profile for The Beat, Steve Morris described him as being at the forefront of digital-comics development, citing his involvement with Zuda Comics, ComiXology's first original comic, and crowdfunding.

High Moon received favorable assessments from several publications. The Washington Post praised its storytelling and color palette, while Publishers Weekly highlighted its integration of mythology and atmospheric artwork. Booklist compared its combination of genres to Sergio Leone's Westerns and monster films. A starred review in Library Journal praised its treatment of race relations and combination of Western adventure with steampunk.

In its coverage of The Only Living Boy, Publishers Weekly described Gallaher's writing as a classic fantasy-exploration narrative and praised Ellis's use of color in the webcomic format. Booklist identified the series' episodic structure and rapid pace as appealing to reluctant readers. Reviewing the first collected volume for ICv2, Nick Smith praised its characterization and emotional expression but criticized its abrupt ending and insufficiently established setting, awarding it 3.5 out of five stars.

Reviewing Box 13, comics critic Sean Kleefeld praised Gallaher's natural dialogue and restraint in allowing Ellis's artwork to carry the narrative. He also commended the adaptation of the comic's presentation between smartphone and print formats.

School Library Journal's Good Comics for Kids included the first two volumes of The Only Living Girl in its survey of graphic novels with Black protagonists, highlighting their technological fantasy, monsters, and superhero-style artwork.

== Awards and nominations ==
The following awards and nominations recognize Gallaher's work, his collaborators, and video game productions to which he contributed.

Year	Award	Category	Work or recipient	Result
2009	Harvey Award	Best Online Comics Work	High Moon — David Gallaher, Steve Ellis, and Scott O. Brown	Won
2009	Harvey Award	Best New Series	High Moon	Nominated
2010	Harvey Award	Best Online Comics Work	High Moon — David Gallaher, Steve Ellis, and Scott O. Brown	Nominated
2010	Harvey Award	Best Inker	Steve Ellis — High Moon	Nominated
2011	Harvey Award	Best Inker	Steve Ellis — Box 13	Nominated
2011	Harvey Award	Best Letterer	Scott O. Brown — Box 13	Nominated
2013	Harvey Award	Best Inker	Steve Ellis — The Only Living Boy	Nominated
2013	Harvey Award	Best Cover Artist	Steve Ellis — The Only Living Boy	Nominated
2014	Harvey Award	Best Original Graphic Publication for Younger Readers	The Only Living Boy	Nominated
2016	Harvey Award	Best Original Graphic Publication for Younger Readers	The Only Living Boy	Nominated
2019	Ringo Award	Best Presentation in Design	The Only Living Boy Omnibus — Papercutz	Nominated
2019	Ringo Award	Best Artist or Penciller	Steve Ellis	Nominated
2019	Gamescom Award	Best PC Game	Tom Clancy's Ghost Recon Breakpoint — Ubisoft	Won

== Selected Bibliography ==
=== Creator-owned comics and graphic novels ===
- High Moon (2007–2018), with Steve Ellis and Scott O. Brown
- Box 13 (2009), with Steve Ellis
- Box 13: The Pandora Process, with Steve Ellis
- The Only Living Boy (2012–2018), with Steve Ellis
- The Only Living Girl (2019–2020), with Steve Ellis

=== Licensed and publisher-owned comics ===
- Yours Truly, Johnny Dollar, Moonstone Books
- Vampire: The Masquerade, Moonstone Books
- Hulk: Winter Guard, Marvel Comics
- Darkstar and the Winter Guard, Marvel Comics
- Deadlands: The Devil's Six Gun, Image Comics
- Convergence: Green Lantern Corps (2015), DC Comics
- The Mighty Crusaders: The Shield (2021), Archie Comics

== Video game credits ==
Year	Title	Role	Notes
2017	Tom Clancy's Ghost Recon Wildlands	Writer	With Ubisoft Paris
2019–2020	Tom Clancy's Ghost Recon Breakpoint	Writer	Base game; four seasons of post-launch content, including the Terminator Live Event and Red Patriot.
2024	Skull and Bones	Creative contributions	With Taliespin.
2024	Flint: Treasure of Oblivion	Preproduction writer	With Taliespin.
2025	Warborne: Above Ashes	Narrative Director	With Taliespin.
