= Jeff the Land Shark =

Marvel Comics character

- Jeff the Land Shark on the cover of It's Jeff! #1 (September 2021). Art by Gurihiru

Publication information
- Publisher: Marvel Comics
- First appearance: Cameo appearance: West Coast Avengers (vol. 3) #6 (December 2018); As Jeff: West Coast Avengers (vol. 3) #7 (January 2019)
- Created by: Kelly Thompson; Daniele di Nicuolo

In-story information
- Species: Land shark
- Team affiliations: West Coast Avengers; Pet Avengers
- Partnerships: Gwenpool; Kate Bishop; Elsa Bloodstone; Wade Wilson
- Notable aliases: Jeffrey
- Abilities: Shark physiology; Master of disguise

Jeff the Land Shark is a fictional character who appears in comic books published by Marvel Comics. Created by writer Kelly Thompson and artist Daniele di Nicuolo, the character first appeared in West Coast Avengers (vol. 3) #6, in December 2018, but was not named and formally introduced until issue #7, in January 2019. Jeff is a landshark (legged shark) adopted by the superheroes Gwenpool and Kate Bishop, and has also been cared for by Wade Wilson, Emma Frost, and Elsa Bloodstone.

Jeff has subsequently appeared in a variety of additional media. He headlines in the digital Marvel's Infinity Comics series It's Jeff! written by Thompson and drawn by Gurihiru, which was first published in September 2021. This vertical scrolling format comic returned for a second season in September 2022, a third season in October 2023, and a fourth season in November 2024. At the Eisner Awards, It's Jeff! was nominated in 2022 for Best Digital Comic and won in 2024 for Best Humor Publication. In December 2024, Jeff debuted as a playable character in the video game Marvel Rivals. Jeff headlines in the print limited series Jeff the Land Shark (vol. 1), written by Thompson and illustrated by Tokitokoro, which began in June 2025. This series was nominated for Best Humor Publication at the 2026 Eisner Awards.

== Publication history ==
=== Comic books ===
Jeff's first official appearance in West Coast Avengers #7 (January 2019) by writer Kelly Thompson and artist Daniele di Nicuolo

Landsharks as a species first appeared in West Coast Avengers (vol. 3) #1 (October 2018), created by writer Kelly Thompson and artist Stefano Caselli. The issue saw a herd of landsharks running through Santa Monica. One of the landsharks drawn by Caselli caught Thompson's eye, so she created a character, drawing on the shark imagery and her own pet cats. This character was first introduced in issue #7, drawn by Daniele di Nicuolo, being adopted by Gwenpool and named "Jeff", as part of an ultimately abandoned running gag where Gwen would adopt (and lose) many infant animals and name them "Jeff", having previously adopted a kitten she'd called by that name. Following a universally positive internet reception, Jeff consequently appeared in the rest of the run of West Coast Avengers. Thompson wrote in a post on her Substack that Jeff's original design included side flippers, which were removed early on.

Jeff returned in Gwenpool Strikes Back (2019), by writer Leah Williams and artist David Baldeon, and Deadpool (volume 8: King Deadpool), by writer Thompson and artists Chris Bachalo and Gerardo Sandoval, as a supporting character. He was also featured in the one-page story "Monsters" by writer Thompson and artist Pepe Larraz which was printed in Marvel's 80th anniversary project Marvel #1000 (2019).

Thompson credits a con exhibition piece by The Unbelievable GwenPool artist duo Gurihiru as popularizing Jeff, after which characters in the Marvel Universe started being depicted with Jeff-themed merchandise. Starting September 2021, Jeff then starred in his own series, titled It's Jeff!, written by Thompson and drawn by Gurihiru. It's Jeff! premiered as part of the new Marvel's Infinity Comics program; these digital comics are in the vertical scrolling format and are only available to Marvel Unlimited subscribers; the series has no dialogue. A second season of It's Jeff! returned in September 2022, running until January 2023, a third season launched in October 2023, running until March 2024, and a fourth season launched with issue #37 in November 2024, running until May 2025. It's Jeff! #1 was released in print in March 2023; this one-shot issue collects the short stories originally published in the digital Infinity Comics format. It's Jeff: The Jeff-Verse #1 was released in November 2023; this print issue collects issues #13-24 of the Infinity Comic.

Jeff has also appeared in the Marvel Meow Infinity Comic (2022) and in the Marvel Unlimited crossover Infinity Paws, written by Jason Loo and drawn by Nao Fuji, which released in spring 2024.

Jeff was "venomized" as part of Marvel's 2023 Summer of Symbiotes event in the short story "The Rhythm of the Night," written by Thompson and drawn by Gurihiru. This story was printed in Extreme Venomverse #5 (July 2023). As part of the 2024 Venom War event, Jeff was featured in the one-shot Venom War: It's Jeff #1 (November 2024), by the same creative team.

Jeff appears in Jeff Week Infinity Comic (2024), a five-issue limited series written and drawn by Gustavo Duarte. He also appeared in Marvel Rivals Infinity Comic (2024), a six-issue limited series by writer Paul Allor and artist Luca Claretti. Jeff and Kate Bishop guest-star in the limited series Gwenpool (2025), by writer Cavan Scott and artist Stefano Nesi, which focuses on Gwenpool and Peter Parker confronting the resurrected Gwen Stacy.

Jeff headlines in the five-issue limited series Jeff The Land Shark (vol. 1), written by Thompson and illustrated by Tokitokoro, with the first issue released in June 2025. Regarding the series, Thompson stated, "I'm thrilled that the slow burn success of Jeff in comics and the wildfire success of Jeff in Marvel Rivals can work together to bring us the opportunity for not only more Jeff stories, but more complex Jeff stories". Jeff also appeared in a backup story with Krypto in the crossover one-shot Deadpool/Batman #1 by DC Comics and Marvel; it was written by Thompson with art by Gurihiru and released in September 2025. Between the release of DC's Superman/Spider-Man #1 and Marvel's Spider-Man/Superman #1, a digital one-shot featuring Jeff and Aquaman was released in April 2026. This crossover issue, It's Jeff/Aquaman #1, was written by Thompson and drawn by Andres Genolet.

Thompson and Tokitokoro reunited for the five-issue limited series Jeff the Land Shark: Superstar, with the first issue releasing in July 2026.

=== Covers ===
Jeff, with Carol Danvers, was featured on the variant cover of Captain Marvel #39 with art by Gurihiru; this version was exclusive to Marvel Unlimited Annual Plus subscribers who attended San Diego Comic-Con in July 2022. Two more variant covers featuring Jeff were then produced, also by Gurihuru, in October 2022: Captain Marvel #42 and Captain America: Symbol of Truth #6. Nao Fuji (artist of Marvel Meow) also produced a variant cover, for Shang-Chi and the Ten Rings #4 (October 2022), featuring Jeff. The "venomized" version of Jeff was featured on two of the Extreme Venomverse #5 (July 2023) covers: the standard cover by Leinil Francis Yu and a variant cover by Peach Momoko.

== Fictional character biography ==
The land sharks are an amphibious four-legged shark species created by MODOK Superior as part of a plan to attack Santa Monica. When the West Coast Avengers led by Kate Bishop defeat the West Coast version of the Masters of Evil, of which MODOK Superior was a part, MODOK Superior's former employee and nemesis Gwenpool finds and adopts a baby land-shark. Gwen names the creature Jeff after a kitten of the same name she had adopted earlier in the series but whom she had to give up. Gwen was also motivated to adopt him by previously having had a shark-theme herself, including a shark backpack, a Blåhaj, a shark phone case, and a sharklike Venom form. Jeff became part of the West Coast Avengers.

At the beginning of Thompson's 2019 Deadpool series, Gwen, a real world being aware of the fictional comic book nature of the Marvel Universe after being transported there, becomes concerned that so many titles featuring her have been cancelled. In an attempt to secure a better future for Jeff, she entrusts him to Wade Wilson, only for his title to be promptly cancelled as well. Jeff is subsequently briefly in the care of Elsa Bloodstone.

It's Jeff! (2021) depicts Jeff as once again living with Gwenpool and Kate Bishop. In the series, "Jeff has been the darling of a superhero pool party; stolen Captain America's shield to sled with the Young Avengers; eaten the Infinity Gauntlet; and swiped a superhero gathering's Thanksgiving turkey". In the 2022 second season, Gwen returns and continues to care for Jeff along with Kate, having been absent for the first season.

During the "Venom War" storyline, Jeff is briefly bonded to a Symbiote. They find a way to work together and obtain food from the stands at Coney Island. When the Zombiotes attack, Jeff assists Kate, Gwen, America Chavez, and Fuse in fighting the Zombiotes. Once the Zombiotes are defeated, Jeff and the Symbiote separate from each other.

== Powers and abilities ==
Jeff is a quadruped land shark with a prodigious appetite. He possesses the normal attributes of an Earth shark except that he is able to breathe out of water, has legs, and possesses enhanced intelligence. His main attack is biting. To blend in when out in public, Jeff uses an assortment of animal costumes.

== Reception ==
=== Critical response ===
Chris Arrant of Newsarama called Jeff the Land Shark a "fan-favorite," writing, "Jeff the Land Shark slowly became a low-key cult-favorite character for some comics fans." Samantha King of Screen Rant referred to Jeff as "Marvel's cutest character," stating, "The little shark has quickly become a fan-favorite in both the real world and Marvel's universe." Nicholas Howe of CBR ranked Jeff the Land Shark 1st in their "10 Cutest Marvel Heroes" list, saying, "Jeff has become one of the most beloved figures of the last few years," while Darby Harn ranked him 6th in their "10 Most Iconic Pets In Marvel Comics" list.

On Jeff's debut in West Coast Avengers, Robbie Pleasant of Multiversity Comics commented that, "it was clear from the get-go that Jeff was the next big thing in comics, an absolute superstar that would dominate the industry, or at least our hearts. Here at Multiversity, it quickly became a running gag in the pages of Saturday Morning Panels just how much we all love that little land shark". In April 2025, Jonathan Jones of AIPT commented that "the lovable land shark's star has remained on a steady rise ever since" his appearance in West Coast Avengers. Jones opined that while some might think the release of a trade paperback collection featuring Jeff is primarily a publishing "synergy strategy" following the character's appearance in the video game Marvel Rivals (2024), he believed it "is a testament to the little guy's enduring rise in popularity over the last four years" following the release of the Jeff-focused Infinity Comic. He noted that Gurihiru's redesign of the character "has become the definitive baseline for Jeff's appearance moving forward" and "together, Thompson and Gurihiru have made Jeff the Land Shark into an iconic character worthy of showing up in your Rivals roster, as well as in Jeff's first printed ongoing comic". In June 2025, Brigid Alverson of ICv2 commented that Jeff is the "biggest success" of the Marvel Unlimited platform, suggesting that "Jeff's fame didn't come from a movie, an animated series, or a broad-based marketing campaign. Just the opposite, in fact: Marvel Unlimited is a subscription-only service". She explained that the platform's required account registration, even for free comics, is a barrier to entry so "Infinity Comics are unlikely to be seen by the sort of casual reader who frequents the other webtoon platforms".

=== Literary reception for It's Jeff! ===
Graeme McMillan, for Polygon in 2021, commented that of the new Infinity Comics, It's Jeff! "is pretty perfect from the start" and "an utter joy" unlike the rest of the line. Jim Dandeneau, for Den of Geek, wrote that "if you have a young person in your life, [It's Jeff!] will completely justify an annual Marvel Unlimited subscription". It was nominated for Best Digital Comic at the 2022 Eisner Awards.

Following the print release in 2023, Avery Kaplan, for The Beat, called the collected issue a "must-read… or a must re-read". Kaplan commented that while in some places there is obvious evidence of the "vestigial scrolling structure" of the comic's original format, it doesn't detract from the issue. Furthermore, she appreciated that Marvel went with a longer issue format in order to print all 12 parts of the first season. Susana Polo of Polygon noted that the plot is no more complicated than "Jeff gets into some shenanigans, finds a cute way out of them," also praising Gurihiru's "charming art" and calling Thompson's writing "Sunday Funnies simple". In May 2024, Robbie Pleasant of Multiversity Comics rated It's Jeff! #1 a 10 out of 10 and noted that the transition into print was done with "bit of a visual distinction to the flow". Pleasant opined that "between [Thompson's] story and Gurihiru's artwork, we get the tale of a happy little land shark who can get into trouble, but mostly just wants to have fun, be loved, and eat all the food he can find. [...] What It's Jeff comes down to is one thing: Jeff the Land Shark is adorable and gets into amusing hijinks. It's not a deep story or character exploration, but it's cute and fun, which is exactly what we want from this comic".

The comic It's Jeff: The Jeff-Verse #1 won Best Humor Publication at the 2024 Eisner Awards. Joshua Kazemi, in a review of Venom War: It's Jeff #1 for CBR, wrote that the one-shot is "incredibly satisfying thanks to Jeff himself" and while it is not very "substantive" and lacks "meaningful character arcs", the issue "is very fun and very cute". Kazemi commented that due to the issue's "great panels, there's never a moment where a reader is questioning what's happening or how Jeff is feeling". In 2025, Thompson was nominated for the Eisner Award for Best Writer for her work on Venom War: It's Jeff #1 and other comics. Jeff The Land Shark (vol. 1), by Thompson and Tokitokoro, was nominated for Best Humor Publication at the 2026 Eisner Awards; Thompson was also nominated for the Eisner Award for Best Writer for her work on the Jeff series as well as other comics.

ComicHub, a point of sale tracking system which provides a "non-random sample" from "stores selling American comics around the world", listed the print one-shot collection It's Jeff: Jeff Week #1 in May 2025 as #40 on "Top 50 Graphic Novels by Units" and #33 on "Top 50 Graphic Novels by Dollars". It's Jeff: Jeff-Verse was also #6 on "ICv2's chart of the Top 10 webtoon franchises in comic stores" for "Spring 2025". Brigid Alverson of ICv2 noted that "Jeff makes the Top 10 on the strength of a single graphic novel" which she attributed to the series "getting a boost from the fact that Jeff is a playable character in Marvel Rivals".

=== Marvel Rivals (2024) ===
Jeff is a playable character in the 2024 hero shooter video game Marvel Rivals. Echo Apsey of Rolling Stone wrote that Marvel Rivals (2024) has "thrust" Marvel side characters such as Jeff "into the spotlight". Cass Marshall of Polygon commented that they were "delighted to discover" the character through the video game and that they were "not alone" in becoming "obsessed with Jeff". Marshall wrote that in play they enjoy Jeff's "toe beans, the way he hums menacingly when he submerges beneath the ground, his reload animation that has him flip on his back and snack on a tasty fish". Apsey similarly noted that Jeff has become an "instant favorite for his adorably menacing antics" and an "internet darling". Herb Scribner of The Washington Post noted the "massive reaction to Jeff" on social media, including a division in the fan reaction, with some describing the character as "MVP or the GOAT" while others "hate him" after being on the receiving end of his abilities. Rich Johnston of Bleeding Cool noted that the resale value of West Coast Avengers (vol. 3) #7 on eBay increased following a spike in Jeff's popularity, which he attributed to Jeff's appearance in the game. The game's first winter seasonal event featured a new game mode, "Jeff's Winter Splash Festival," in which every player played as Jeff in a mode similar to the Nintendo series Splatoon.

== Titles ==
Title	Issues	Writer(s)	Artist(s)	Debut date	Conclusion date	Notes
It's Jeff Infinity Comic (season 1)	#1–12	Kelly Thompson	Gurihiru	September 2, 2021	November 25, 2021	Digital release on Marvel Unlimited
It's Jeff Infinity Comic (season 2)	#13–24	Kelly Thompson	Gurihiru	September 9, 2022	January 13, 2023	Digital release on Marvel Unlimited
It's Jeff!	#1	Kelly Thompson	Gurihiru	March 29, 2023		Print one-shot which collects It's Jeff Infinity Comic (2021) #1–12
It's Jeff Infinity Comic (season 3)	#25–36	Kelly Thompson	Gurihiru	October 20, 2023	March 29, 2024	Digital release on Marvel Unlimited
It's Jeff: The Jeff-Verse	#1	Kelly Thompson	Gurihiru	November 1, 2023		Print one-shot which collects It's Jeff Infinity Comic (2021) #13–24
Jeff Week Infinity Comic (vol. 1)	#1–5	Gustavo Duarte		September 23, 2024	September 27, 2024	Digital release on Marvel Unlimited
Venom War: It's Jeff #1	#1	Kelly Thompson	Gurihiru	November 20, 2024		Tie-in issue for the Venom War event
It's Jeff Infinity Comic (season 4)	#37–49	Kelly Thompson	Gurihiru	November 29, 2024	May 2, 2025	Digital release on Marvel Unlimited
It's Jeff: Jeff-Verse	—N/a	Kelly Thompson	Gurihiru	April 29, 2025		Trade paperback which collects It's Jeff (2023) #1, It's Jeff: The Jeff-Verse (2023) #1, and Venom War: It's Jeff (2024) #1
It's Jeff: Jeff Week	#1	Kelly Thompson	Gurihiru, Gustavo Duarte	May 7, 2025		Print one-shot which collects It's Jeff Infinity Comic (2021) #25–36 and Jeff Week Infinity Comic (2024) #1–5
Jeff The Land Shark (vol. 1)	#1–5	Kelly Thompson	Tokitokoro	June 4, 2025	October 22, 2025	Limited series
It's Jeff & Other Marvel Tails	#1	Kelly Thompson, Alyssa Wong, Nao Fuji	Gurihiru, Bob Quinn, Nao Fuji	September 9, 2025		Print one-shot which collects episodes from It's Jeff Infinity Comic, Alligator Loki Infinity Comic (2022), and Marvel Meow Infinity Comic (2022)
Jeff Week Infinity Comic (vol. 2)	#1–5	Kelly Thompson	Gurihiru, Goodman Yamada	September 22, 2025	September 26, 2025	Digital release on Marvel Unlimited; alternatively titled as Jeff Week: The Kraken Awakes
It's Jeff/Aquaman	#1	Kelly Thompson	Andres Genolet	April 8, 2026		Digital release on Marvel Unlimited
Jeff the Land Shark: Friends & Foes	—N/a	Kelly Thompson	Tokitokoro	May 6, 2026		Trade paperback which collects Jeff The Land Shark (2025) #1–5
It's Jeff: Brand New Week	#1	Kelly Thompson	Gurihirum, Goodman Yamada	June 3, 2026		Print one-shot which collects Jeff Week (2025) #1–5 as well as material from Deadpool (2019) and Marvel Comics (2023) #1000
Jeff the Land Shark: Superstar	#1–5	Kelly Thompson	Tokitokoro	July 8, 2026	November 11, 2026	Limited series
Jeff Week Infinity Comic (vol. 3)	#1–5	Kelly Thompson, Gurihiru	Gurihiru	September 7, 2026	September 11, 2026	Digital release on Marvel Unlimited
Jeff the Land Shark: Superstar	—N/a	Kelly Thompson	Tokitokoro	April 6, 2027		Trade paperback which collects Jeff the Land Shark: Superstar #1–5

== In other media ==
=== Television ===
Jeff the Land Shark appears in Spidey and His Amazing Friends, with vocal effects provided by Rama Vallury. This version is a long-time friend of the pirate Web-Beard and resident of Spider-Island.

=== Film ===
- Jeff the Land Shark appears in Lego Marvel Avengers: Mission Demolition.
- Brad Winderbaum, the head of television, streaming, and animation at Marvel Studios, said in December 2024 that Jeff will appear in the Marvel Cinematic Universe.

=== Tabletop games ===
- Jeff the Land Shark appears in Marvel United: X-Men (2021) board game via Gwenpool's Kickstarter exclusive miniature.
- Jeff the Land Shark appears in Marvel: Crisis Protocol (2019) board game via the "Gwenpool Character Pack" released in 2023.
- Jeff the Land Shark appears in Marvel United: Multiverse (2024) board game via the Pet Companions expansion which was released as a Kickstarter stretch goal.
- Jeff the Land Shark is scheduled to appear in the expansion Marvel Rivals: Timestream Adventure (2026) for the Marvel Multiverse Role-Playing Game (2023). The adventure will be written by Paul Allor and Matt Forbeck and will also include a prequel comic by Allor with art by Ig Guara.

=== Video games ===
- Jeff the Land Shark appears as a playable character in Marvel Puzzle Quest.
- Jeff the Land Shark appears as a card in Marvel Snap.
- Jeff the Land Shark appears as a playable character in Marvel Rivals, voiced by Jon Bailey. This version is a former prisoner in the Collector's menagerie who was freed by Mantis.
- Jeff the Land Shark appears as a playable character in Marvel: Future Fight.

=== Miscellaneous ===
Jeff the Land Shark received an action figure in Hasbro's Marvel Legends line in 2020. The figure was bundled with a figure of the villain Shiklah. This action figure, Jeff's first, includes the side flippers which were subsequently removed from the character's design. In 2026, Jeff was featured in a 2-pack with Venom as part of the Marvel Rivals wave of figures in Hasbro's Marvel Legends Gamerverse line.
