= Gwenpool =

Fictional character appearing in Marvel Comics

- Gwenpool as depicted on the cover of The Unbelievable Gwenpool #1 (April 2016). Art by Gurihiru.

Publication information
- Publisher: Marvel Comics
- First appearance: Character design: Deadpool's Secret Secret Wars #2 (June 2015; Chris Bachalo variant cover); Character: Howard the Duck vol. 6 #1 (November 2015)
- Created by: Character: Christopher Hastings (writer); Heather Antos (editor); Jordan D. White (idea); Design: Chris Bachalo (artist)

In-story information
- Alter ego: Gwendolyn "Gwen" Poole
- Species: Human (posing as a mutant)
- Place of origin: Brooklyn, New York City, The Real World
- Team affiliations: Mercenary Organization Dedicated Only to Killing; Champions; Young Avengers; West Coast Avengers
- Abilities: Vast knowledge of the Marvel Universe; Medium-awareness and interaction; Inter-dimensional travel; Reality manipulation; Use of extreme weaponry; Hand-to-hand combattant; Dynamite gams

Gwenpool (Gwendolyn "Gwen" Poole; colloquial: "GwenPool") is a fictional character appearing in American comic books published by Marvel Comics. Marvel initially produced two stories featuring Gwenpool, a girl from the real world transported to the Marvel Universe. The character, created by Christopher Hastings, Heather Antos and Jordan D. White, first appeared in a backup story in Howard the Duck, (Note: The character's costume design originated as an amalgam of Gwen Stacy and Wade Wilson created by Chris Bachalo for a variant cover of Deadpool's Secret Secret Wars #2, which was one of twenty such variant covers published due to the popularity of Spider-Gwen from June 2015.) and a one-shot Gwenpool Holiday Special, illustrated by Gurihiru. Following the publication of the one-shot, an ongoing series titled The Unbelievable Gwenpool by the same creative team was announced, illustrated by Gurihiru (with Irene Strychalski), which started in April 2016 and concluded in April 2018. The Unbelievable Gwenpool #0, collecting Gwen's appearances from Howard the Duck and the first Gwenpool Holiday Special, was later released, as well as the limited series Gwenpool Strikes Back, Aromancing of Gwendolyn Poole, the final volume of Spider-Man/Deadpool, and Gwenpool (2025). In West Coast Avengers, Gwen is depicted as the owner/mother of Jeff the Land Shark, appearing alongside him in the spin-off series It's Jeff! from its second season onwards. The nemesis of the supervillain MODOK, Gwen faces off against him in The Unbelievable Gwenpool, West Coast Avengers, and MODOK: Head Games.

The story arc Beyond the Fourth Wall introduces an evil future version of Gwen as the archenemy of Miles Morales, later featured as the main antagonist of the video game Marvel Duel, of which Gwen also serves as the protagonist, and as a playable character in Marvel Contest of Champions, Lego Marvel Super Heroes 2, and Fortnite.

== Publication history ==
Gwenpool on the cover of Deadpool's Secret Secret Wars #2

In June 2015, following the popularity of Spider-Gwen, all Marvel titles being published had alternate covers with Gwen Stacy reimagined as other characters, such as Doctor Strange, Groot and Wolverine. One of those was Wade Wilson, featured on Chris Bachalo's variant cover for Deadpool's Secret Secret Wars #2. After seeing how many fans were cosplaying as a character who was not even featured in any comic, Marvel editor Jordan White approached writer Christopher Hastings and editor Heather Antos with the task of creating a story around her, with the stipulation of the character being wholly unrelated in backstory to either Deadpool or Gwen (keeping her film and television rights at Marvel Studios, instead of at 20th Century Fox or Sony Pictures). They would introduce the character with a three-issue backup story in the ongoing volume of Howard the Duck (November 2015–January 2016), titled "Ms. Poole if You're Nasty", and then a one-shot comic Gwenpool Special #1 (December 2015). After a meeting with White and Howard the Duck editor Will Moss, Hastings came out with the idea of a character aware of the fourth wall, "but it comes from this place of knowing she is in a comic book because she is from a world where the comic books actually exist", which would also initially lead to a cavalier attitude towards the world in which she inhabits "because she doesn't believe there [are] any consequences to her actions", something Hastings summed as "she decides to [initially] use that [comic book] knowledge like she's in Grand Theft Auto or something". A contrast would be that Gwenpool lacked any of the training or superpowers expected of Marvel characters.

The Howard the Duck arc, from November 2015 to January 2016, was drawn by Brazilian artist Danilo Beyruth, and the holiday special, published in December 2015, had art by Japanese duo Gurihiru. Once Marvel decided to make a Gwenpool ongoing series (named The Unbelievable Gwenpool), starting in April 2016, Hastings asked for Gurihiru's return to the artwork team, with the title being edited by Antos, The Unbelievable Gwenpool solo series ended at issue #25. also appearing in the specials Gwenpool Holiday Special: Merry Mix-Up #1 and Edge of Venomverse #2. Gwenpool then joined the Fresh Start incarnation of the West Coast Avengers in 2018. After that book ended, the character starred in the 2019 limited series Gwenpool Strikes Back, written by Leah Williams and drawn by Spanish artist David Baldeón, and appeared in the 2020–21 promotional limited series MODOK: Head Games by M.O.D.O.K. showrunners Patton Oswalt and Jordan Blum (with art by Scott Hepburn) as a supporting character. In 2022, she was added as a main character to the webtoon series It's Jeff!, written by Thompson and illustrated by Gurihiru, raising her "son" Jeff the Land Shark along with Kate Bishop. In 2023, Gwen starred in a five-issue storyline in the romance anthology series Love Unlimited entitled "Aromancing of Gwendolyn Poole" ("A Romancing of Gwendolyn Poole"), written by Jeremy Whitley, in which the citogenesis-induced interpretation of the character being aro-ace was made canon in the text. The same year, she appears in Alligator Loki attending a beach day with Jeff and Laura Kinney, illustrated with red hair and a blue beachwear version of her suit due to the series' colorist Pete Pantazis (on not being given a reference image for "Gwen" and not being familiar with Gwen Poole's character) having decided to instead give her the red hair and blue color scheme of Gwen Tennyson from Ben 10 as an Easter egg. As part of the 2024 Venom War event, Gwen was featured in the one-shot Venom War: It's Jeff #1 (November 2024), again written by Thompson and illustrated by Gurihiru. In May 2025, Gwen returned in the solo series The All-New All-Deadly Gwenpool (or simply Gwenpool), following her as she and Kate team up with Peter Parker against a purple-clad impostor Gwenpool: Gwen Stacy, resurrected with Weapon X-like abilities as the hyper-violent X-31. After being rendered a ghost, Gwen then possesses Peter to face X-31 before being returned to life.

== Fictional character biography ==
=== Backstory ===
Gwendolyn "Gwen" Poole arrived to the Marvel Universe from what she claims to be "the real world". In her home reality, Gwen had been a comics superfan as an escape from her life as an unemployed 18- (or 19-)year-old high school dropout. Unwilling to be an "extra" in the Marvel world, she went to a tailor for superheroes and requested her own costume. The tailor (named Ronnie) complied, but misread Gwen's application form, and thought Gwen went by the alias of "Gwenpool", leading to a costume similar to Deadpool's. Upon gaining the ability to manipulate the borders of the fourth wall from an attempt to return her to reality, allowing her to travel in time, Gwen retcons the Marvel Universe into believing her to be a mutant after being given the idea by Kamala Khan, allowing her to enter the gates of Krakoa.

=== Solo series ===
Gwenpool's first appearance as a character was in Howard the Duck Vol 6 #1 (later republished in The Unbelievable Gwenpool #0), when she was involved in stealing a humanity-destroying virus from Black Cat and selling it to Hydra to get money easily, believing that the Avengers would simply deal with any consequences. When she revealed to Howard the Duck the item she had stolen from Hardy and to whom she had sold it, Howard scolded her and informed her that the Avengers were not available to save the Earth from the virus. Guilt stricken, she then set out with Howard to retrieve the virus from a Hydra base.

In the 2015 Gwenpool Special, Gwenpool is hired on her first mercenary job, to kill a villain. After completing her mission, Gwenpool attends a Christmas party hosted by She-Hulk, where she is seen talking to Ms. Marvel.

Gwenpool unmasked

Following the events of Gwenpool Holiday Special #1, Gwenpool becomes a full-time mercenary. While trying to deposit the money she made killing Orto, Gwen stops a bank robbery by killing all of the robbers, except for the gang's hacker Cecil, whom she enlists as a reluctant sidekick. After a mission revolving around extraterrestrial arms dealers where she killed MODOK Superior's best agent and took credit for his work, MODOK tracked Gwenpool down. He murdered Cecil to persuade her to become his henchman and an agent for his Mercenary Organization Dedicated Only to Killing. Gwenpool joins MODOK's elite squad, which also includes the alchemist Mega Tony, the magician Terrible Eye, and Batroc the Leaper, who gives Gwen basic combat and firearms training.

Gwenpool then arranged a meeting between herself and Doctor Strange, in which she explained to him that she was from a reality where all Marvel characters are fictional characters in comic books. Doctor Strange agreed to transfer her history from Gwen's original world to create a fake background for her in the Marvel Universe, so that she could get her Social Security number, driver's license and other essential documents. However, this allows MODOK Superior to discover Gwen's ordinary, powerless background, and he swears to destroy Gwen for lying to him and having no credentials to be a mercenary. Gwen and MODOK then engage in battle, and she defeats him with the hacking assistance of Cecil, who returns as a ghost.

Without MODOK, Gwen becomes the new leader of the MODOK organization, but learns she is wanted by the alien arms dealers, who are known as Teuthidans. Assisted by a rogue Doombot named Vincent Doonan and MODOK's other agents, Gwenpool's team defeats the Teuthidans, but destroys the MODOK base in the process. Without a base or funding, Batroc and the others decide to disband MODOK.

During the Civil War II storyline, Gwenpool appears in Georgia attempting to earn the bounty on an alien smuggler named Chammy, only to discover that Rocket Raccoon and Groot are also after him. The three end up fighting another alien named Reeve, who put the bounty on Chammy. After Reeve defeats them and escapes, Chammy tells Rocket, Groot and Gwen that Reeve is looking for a formula that could temporarily neutralize Captain Marvel's powers, allowing him to kill her. Gwen refuses to help at first, under the logic that Captain Marvel, being one of the most important "characters" in the current "story", would not be killed off in "a comic about a talking tree and raccoon". However, after coincidentally running into Kitty Pryde, Gwen falls under the mistaken impression that the comic she is currently in was being written by Brian Michael Bendis, a "big-deal comic book writer" with a fixation on Pryde who would have the authority to kill Captain Marvel. Convinced that Captain Marvel's life is actually in danger, Gwen accompanies Rocket and Groot to the Triskelion, where they and Chammy help defeat Reeve, and Gwen realizes that the real writer put Kitty Pryde on the street to trick her into helping.

After short team-ups with the Champions, Blade, Deadpool, and the duo of Ghost Rider and Kate Bishop, Gwen meets her brother Teddy, who drags her back to her world (or a close facsimile).

Here Gwen loses her memories of her time in the Marvel Universe and resumes an ordinary life, but she gradually becomes once again aware that she is in a comic book. Gwen then begins experimenting with the fourth wall again and learns to interact with the comic book medium by erasing the walls between panels and even climbing out of the panels, finding herself looking in on her life.

Watching the past from outside the borders, Gwen sees the "extra pages" of her Holiday Special, in which when her brother Teddy was sucked into the Marvel Universe, he ended up working for Orto the snake swordsman. Upon seeing her kill Orto's henchmen, Teddy runs into versions of Spider-Man, The Terrible Eye, and Vincent Doonan, who claim to be from a future where Gwen becomes a huge threat and destroys their lives. They offer him the chance to "return home" with his sister and fix things. Being concerned for Gwen's mental health, and having had a terrible time, he readily agrees. On finding this out Gwen, with her memory and costume restored, re-enters the borders, confronts Teddy for trying to undo the past and steal her dream of living in a comic, and shows him that their "parents" are not real, and they never even left the comic.

Terrible Eye explains that their attempts to send the Pooles to their home dimension created a pocket dimension from their memories that was almost identical to their real one. The three realize that trapping Gwen was what led to her gaining her powers over reality in the first place. When Spider-Man narrates a flashback sequence of the future evil Gwen's misdeeds, the evil Gwen herself travels through the flashback's panels to follow him to the present.

Future Gwen battles Spider-Man, Terrible Eye, and Doonan, while each side tries to convince the present Gwen to join their cause. Future Gwen, weakened by Present Gwen's self-doubt, kills Doonan, Terrible Eye, and Spider-Man. This act of violence horrifies her past self, prompting Future Gwen to reveal her villainous motivation: growing weary of having her heroic deeds constantly erased by the narrative's progression, she shifted to committing violence against "narratively significant" characters to ensure her actions had permanent consequences. This meta-commentary is immediately validated when Spider-Man's death is retconned moments later due to his critical importance to the overarching plot. However, Present Gwen is disgusted at the idea of hurting the characters she has grown to love, and wipes her future self from existence. This comes at the cost of erasing all of the Evil Gwen stories and thus dramatically shortening Present Gwen's lifespan.

Learning that the universe is attempting to make her into a joke villain, Gwen wants to make sure her evil self never comes to be. To catch the attention of the Avengers she visits Latveria in an attempt to face off with Doctor Doom, thinking him to still be evil, as she has not read Infamous Iron Man. It is revealed that she and Cecil, now in his mystical monster body, share an apartment and since she has given up killing people because it's hacking to pay the bills. A short time later after rescuing Vincent Doonan from Paste Pot Pete and throwing him into the void between comic panels as a demonstration of her new superpower, Gwen asks Vincent where to find the real Doom so she can defeat him and prove herself to be a fameworthy hero. Vincent leads her to Doom, who explains he is reformed, but Gwen still attacks him, releasing an evil version of Doom from within him.

After a brief fight in which she realizes she cannot kill the Doom doppelganger, the real Doom comes to her aid and destroys his evil past self. He and Gwen have a chat about why she wanted to kill him, which turns out to be because since destroying her evil destiny self, her comic pages are running out and she believes she is doomed to be cancelled. With only a few pages left, once Doom is gone, she wonders if she has to become a super villain.

In the final chapter of Unbelievable Gwenpool, a Gwen from the future appears to her and explains that while her first comic series has ended, she is already in several other comics, toys, games, fan works, and so on. Even if her current book ends, she and her side characters will return in future stories. Meanwhile, in between these pages, Gwen enlists the help of Stephen Strange and her friends to restore Cecil to human form. She is given a watch that counts down the issue's remaining pages and she uses the rest, one page at a time, to see old friends, team up with new superheroes, rescue her brother from Hell, meet the Marvel Universe counterparts of her parents, and chase off M.O.D.O.K. one more time. Future Gwen then says goodbye to the audience and goes back to where the chapter started to talk to her past self, creating a loop.

=== West Coast Avengers Vol. 3 ===
After recently having been beaten up and humiliated with tickling by a clone of Squirrel Girl, and later attending the funeral of a separate Skrull duplicate of Squirrel Girl, Gwen visits Kate Bishop in Los Angeles, before being drafted to join the accidentally reformed West Coast Avengers. She instantly enters into conflict with one of the members, Quentin Quire, but their clashes and shouting matches eventually evolve into passionate kisses. Gwen later reveals to the camera crew that she pursued a romance with Quentin to avoid the disposable status of a supporting character and reduce her likelihood of dying—a strategy she also considered attempting with America Chavez. Along with the other Avengers, Gwen helps stop giant monsters created by the original M.O.D.O.K., adopts a baby land-shark she names Jeff, and faces an alliance of villains headed by Madame Masque. Later, during the War of the Realms storyline, Gwen and the West Coast Avengers assist Otto Octavius in protecting San Francisco, and she uses her perspective as a Marvel Universe outsider and a fellow B-list hero to help him come to terms with his lack of a star role in the event.

=== Spider-Man/Deadpool Vol. 9 ===
After popping up in the daydream of Wade Wilson while he fights alongside Peter Parker before finding her way "out of this book", Gwen returns to assist the duo in taking on Robbie "The Manipulator" Thompson, a comic-book writer who had written a version of himself into the story as a supervillain, Gwen using her access to the Gutter Space outside reality (no greatly outpowering the duo) to provide the duo with weaponry, and write them through various incarnations of popular events to defeat the Manipulator and render his destruction of reality non-canon, before confining him to prison.

=== Gwenpool Strikes Back (2019) ===
In this miniseries, after breaking up with Quentin and using encounters with Peter Parker, Wade Wilson, and the Fantastic Four as filler for its first two issues, Gwen uses a new ability to create flashbacks to things that had previously never happened (allowing her to manipulate reality) to acquire a fortune from Tony Stark post-Civil War II to allow her to pit the heroes of the Marvel Universe against one another in a battle royale. After accidentally setting herself to combat the Immortal Hulk, Gwen pulls previous versions of herself, as portrayed by different writers and artists, from the Gutter, forming a six-Gwen team known as the GwenHive. Gwen leaves the GwenHive to enter combat with the Hulk while she dives into continuity, leading to the death of the Gwen from Champions. Gwen returns, having stolen Mjolnir and the severed arm of Thor Odinson, and uses them to defeat the Hulk. Gwen then finds herself facing Kamala Khan as the tourney's final battle. Fearing for her continued existence, and upon being accidentally inspired by Khan, Gwen uses the retcon ability to convince Khan and the wider Marvel Universe that she is a mutant, hoping that as a "mutant" resident of Krakoa she will remain "in continuity"; upon arriving, she encounters James "Logan" Howlett and Quentin. After leaving Jeff with Wade while dressed in her original Chris Bachalo design, Gwen later avoids participating in a Fortnite tie-in while drinking with Kwannon, Mystique, Storm and Domino. After being hired by A.I.M. Scientist Supreme Monica Rappaccini to kill MODOK (being accredited for having briefly killed him when she first launched him into space), Gwen assumes that she has been given a new ongoing Gwenpool series and happily kills MODOK, only to realize with a sigh (upon viewing his projected memories of a family) that he is being humanised, and she is merely a guest star in his book—the villain of his story. Entering the Gutter, Gwen proceeds to rearrange the comic's pages and retcon MODOK's death to having been merely knocked out by an EMP. Gwen helps MODOK discover his family's home from his memories, and MODOK grants Gwen his respect. Gwen is later seen wearing cosplay for a fan convention, and is also seen in Los Angeles celebrating the repeal of Kamala's Law with Robbie Reyes and the West Coast Avengers, and leaves a mug with her face on it to Kate as a parting gift.

=== It's Jeff! (2022–present) ===
In 2022, after being an unseen character in the 2021 first season of It's Jeff!, Gwenpool returned as a main on-page character, continuing to raise her "son" Jeff the Land Shark along with Kate Bishop. While initially living in different houses, Gwen later moves in with Kate.

=== Aromancing of Gwendolyn Poole (2023) ===
In Aromancing of Gwendolyn Poole, originally published as Love Unlimited: Gwenpool and announced as the similarly-spelled A Romancing of Gwendolyn Poole, Gwenpool explores her relationship with romance, trying to date Wither and Elixir, and then dating Julie Power. Over this series, after being trapped in the romance comic for several months, Gwen comes to the "realisation" (being told by Julie) that she is aromantic and asexual, or aro-ace.

=== Gwenpool (2025) ===
In the limited series Gwenpool (2025), Gwen Stacy is resurrected with Weapon X-like abilities as Weapon X-31. Her mysterious handler known as the "Grand Architect" calls her by the "Gwenpool" name, which she dislikes. The real Gwen Poole teams up with Peter Parker in an unlikely adventure, both to figure out who revived Gwen, why she is wearing a purple version of Poole's suit, and how to stop her. When Gwenpool was killed, her ghost remains. She would later interact with this Gwenpool and learned that this Gwen is actually the reanimated Gwen Stacy (Stacy's soul in a clone body) from Dead No More: The Clone Conspiracy. They worked together to fight the forces of the Weapon X base that the Grand Architect works in. When Spider-Man, Kate Bishop, and Jeff the Land Shark arrive to join the fight, the Grand Architect is unmasked as a counterpart of Marvel Comics writer Cavan Scott. After regaining her body which has been made into a Deathlok, Gwenpool persuades X-31 to spare the Grand Architect's life. While planning to have MegaTony work to restore her body by her next appearance, Gwenpool and the group then proceed to fight Fin Fang Foom.

== Powers and abilities ==
Gwenpool originally had no real superpowers, only vast knowledge of the Marvel Universe from comic books in her universe, such as every secret identity of both heroes and villains. She has used this information to take down Black Cat's criminal empire and to stop Thor from attacking her. She is able to exploit her fourth-wall knowledge to her advantage, understanding when comic-book tropes will allow her to avoid unpleasant or life-threatening consequences, such as falls that would realistically be lethal. She also seems to gain uncanny luck at dodging bullets and eluding enemies just by merit of being the hero of her story.

Gwenpool is trained in weapons and hand-to-hand combat by Batroc during The Unbelievable Gwenpool vol. 2. She continued to train after she left Batroc and with her skills much improved, she was able to take out a group of minions by herself while on the West Coast Avengers using acrobatics and her katanas.

Gwenpool possesses fourth-wall awareness, allowing her to perceive her existence as a comic book, manipulate panels and the "gutter space" between them, interact with word bubbles, and exploit her meta-fictional knowledge of the Marvel Universe to alter characters and exploit their weaknesses. In West Coast Avengers, Gwen notes she is not fully able to exploit the comics medium with her powers as she did in her own title, making her think it was part of a potential character reboot, noting that her powers are specifically no longer working quite as well when other people are watching her.

In Gwenpool Strikes Back, she learned she now has Evil Gwen's reality-manipulating power to alter history by "recalling" flashback sequences, retroactively causing them to have happened. Ms. Marvel, disbelieving the Marvel Universe reality to be a comic, incorrectly theorises that Gwen is actually a reality-altering mutant. While untrue, Gwen decides to accept this theory as Marvel Universe reality, allowing her to live care-free in the mutant nation of Krakoa without her presence being questioned.

In her Love Unlimited arc, Gwenpool specifically requested to have "dynamite gams" added to her wiki entry as one of her powers, after it was said by Julie Power, while faking an educational history to allow her to leave Krakoa and attend a university.

=== Relationships ===
- Teddy Poole: Gwen's brother who was also brought to the Marvel universe. He is less prone to seeing the world as a comic book and has yet to show any of Gwen's powers, but seems immune to her ability to alter reality. He briefly took work for a snake man named Orto before Gwen killed him. On seeing her slaughter the villain's minions he was horrified and could not bring himself to talk to her before she rushed off to the She-Hulk X-mas party. Almost immediately he was contacted by some future versions of Gwen's friends who had seen her destroy their future. They had no problem convincing Teddy they were right and he helped lure Gwen into a trap, only to have it not work as the two cannot be returned to their real world. Later, after she escaped, Gwen looked for him and finally found Teddy in Hell being tortured by Mephisto, for no apparent reason. She and Squirrel Girl rescued him and then, as she was dealing with the end of her series and was afraid she would be forgotten, forgot about him. In Gwenpool Strikes Back she did mention him and that the whole thing was still unresolved.
- Her "Parents": Copies of her parents were found living in the Marvel universe. At first they showed up at Officer Grey's Police precinct thinking Gwen might be their daughter. Then it turned out they rented their home to Gwen's future friends and Teddy, completely unaware of their existence and joking about how the renters of their house were probably supervillains using it as a lair. Later Gwen introduced herself to them and told them about Teddy right before Moon Girl and The Power Pack broke through the wall. They took it in stride and even seemed happy, though slightly worried that their house would be blown up a lot more in the future. Gwen probably paid to have the place fixed, since she is quite wealthy these days.
- Big Ronnie: A woman who sells "battle spandex" costumes and runs a mercenary for hire business. She made Gwen's suit and gave her her superhero name by accident.
- Cecil: The son of rednecks who ran away to the city to be a hacker and got forcibly inducted into his uncle's gang, Gwenpool killed the gang and basically took Cecil hostage as her helper. He was briefly killed by M.O.D.O.K. only to be brought back first as a giant monster and then himself by Gwen because she felt bad for getting him killed. He is an elite hacker and has a giant purple dog monster for a loyal pet.
- Terrible Eye: Gwen's only girl friend on the merc crew they were all forcibly forced to join she has a mask that allows her mystical access to knowledge beyond the ken of man. She has to take breaks from it though because she starts going mad if it is worn too long and having long conversations with rocks. She usually casts spells with rhymes but a future version of her who was one of Dr. Strange's eventual replacements did once say "Are you there Hoary Hosts of Hogath? It's me, Sara." Free from her previous unwanted employment she now has a small apartment and is attending a school for witchcraft in New York.
- MegaTony: An Alchemist and former team member of Gwen's. He had a hard time adjusting to life in the super community when their mercenary team fell apart, but Gwen helped get him a job working for Peter Parker.
- Batroc the Leaper: A semi-major supervillain and sort of a big brother to Gwen, in her comics he is reasonably nice and helpful at least to her and her friends. But only in her comics. Elsewhere he is a dangerous killer. When Gwen expressed a desire for supervillainy he helped her Robin Hood some gold from an illegal casino, making her independently wealthy and no longer needing to worry about money, at least for a while.
- Vincent Doonan: A rogue Doombot who first hired Gwen when she defeated M.O.D.O.K. and then turned against her when he decide she was the biggest threat to his quiet small town life style. This resulted in him getting credit for saving his neighborhood from the alien arms dealers he was actually working with and unwanted attention as a hero. After trying to take out Doctor Doom together the two seem to have reconciled and become friends. He allowed Squirrel Girl to access his systems for her computer class and helped resurrect her friend Cecil.
- Officer Grey: A policewoman who tried to arrest Gwenpool, despite the rogue Doombot attacking her at the time. Gwen, not wanting to see her dead, asked her name and declared her no longer a mere extra, so she would not be easily killed. Later she tried to arrest Gwen for fighting an evil snake man only to be told by the other cops that they were letting her go. She seemed to hear Gwen mention that they were in a comic and unlike other characters in Marvel, actually seemed to believe her for a second. She also briefly tried to get Gwen to do some community service, but was again thwarted since the universe would not let Gwen do anything that boring.
- Various Heroes and Villains: Gwen has made friends and enemies among various heroes and villains. So far however they only seem to remember her in her actual presence and she has surprisingly not yet got a main nemesis, though she tried to make Doctor Doom into one and ended up befriending him instead. None of them believe Gwen when she tells them she is in a comic and Ms. Marvel even suggested she might be a reality altering mutant, ending in Gwen getting rewritten into that role, even though Gwen does not really believe it and only accepted it because it opened up a lot of paths for her comic to continue.
- Pool-Boys: More all-male mercenaries working for M.O.D.O.K. they were the backup squad and rarely used by him as Gwenpool's team were the A-listers. After Gwen dressed them as her to keep them invulnerable as a funny and unique one-time fight against the alien arms dealers. They were subsequently arrested. Later they met up with Gwen and her friends in the park, still wearing her costume, and helped drive off their former boss. It is unclear what eventually happened to them.
- Gwen-Pig: To fool the aliens who were after her Gwen dressed a pig up in her costume. The pig was later adopted by MegaTony and apparently insists on still wearing the costume.

== Cultural impact and legacy ==
=== Critical reception ===
Gab Hernandez of Screen Rant referred to Gwenpool as one of Marvel's "iconic West Coast Avengers," writing, "The West Coast Avengers have always been admired for their more oddball cast of characters, often including weirdos like Moon Knight and Gwenpool in their ranks. The variety of members and their fascinating ensemble personalities make fans love the roster of the West Coast Team. [...] Gwen is one of the most happy-go-lucky heroes in the Marvel universe, and fans love her fourth-wall-breaking ways. In many respects, Gwenpool is essentially just a comic book fan who has somehow ended up in the 616 universes, and that really shines with how much she fangirls over certain characters. Gwenpool is very optimistic, and while her mile-a-minute talking makes her annoying to some, most fans find her relatable. Despite her fourth wall knowledge though, she does have a charming naivety to her, and generally believes the best out of everyone because she knows what their best looks like. Usually."

David Harth of Comic Book Resources described Gwenpool as one of Marvel's "joke characters long-time fans will always love & remember," stating, "Joke characters are a venerable tradition in comic books. So many Silver Age concepts are humorous and it's from those older concepts that comics got their stigma as an art form only for children or infantilized adults. Marvel, even back in the Silver Age, had always fought against that sort of thing, presenting comics that were more serious for an older audience. […] The mere idea of Gwenpool is so ridiculous that it boggles the mind that she's became so popular in a very short amount of time. To date, she's probably the only character to ever get a full fledged comic run because she was popular on the cosplay scene. She first appeared as a gag on a variant cover [and] it's kind of doubtful anyone involved guessed how popular she'd become. What really saved the character was the thought put into her- she was a girl from an alternate universe who loved Marvel and ended up in the Marvel Universe, where she would use her knowledge of comics and her powers to literally manipulate the comic medium to her advantage."

Steven Petite of GameSpot described Gwenpool as "one of the most interesting recently created characters under the Marvel umbrella."

John Tibbetts of WhatCulture called Gwenpool one of the "best new comic book characters of the decade," asserting, "Marvel has been on something of a god damn roll this last decade. Sure the comics aren't seeing even a fraction of the movies' success, but at least the stories are always top quality for the most part. For proof of this, look no further than Gwenpool. Despite what the name may imply, this is not Gwen Stacy dressing up as Deadpool. No, this is a girl from the real world dressing up as Deadpool after being sucked into the Marvel universe. Now, we've seen this trope a lot – especially if you like current anime. But what makes Gwenpool so interesting is that the story plays both for laughs and for drama the fact that Gwenpool knows both comic book storytelling tropes AND the industry behind them. Meaning not only do the inside jokes she makes cut a LOT deeper than other stories of this nature, but it leads to some shocking moments like when her first friend dies a bloody gory death, and she realizes that the guy isn't popular enough to convince Marvel to bring him back so he's likely gone for good. Gwenpool is a thesis paper on metafiction and meta-commentary personified in a single character, and we love her to pieces for it."

Gwenpool has been described as one of Marvel's most notable and powerful female heroes. Gwenpool is one of the first openly aromantic asexual superheroes in American comic books, and the first openly asexual or aromantic character to come out in a book published by Marvel Comics.

=== Accolades ===
- In 2017, Comic Book Resources ranked Gwenpool 1st in their "15 Popular Comic Book Characters That Started As Jokes" list.
- In 2017, ComicBook.com included Gwenpool in their "Top 5 Deadpool Costumes" list.
- In 2019, WhatCulture ranked Gwenpool 6th in their "10 Best New Comic Book Characters Of The Decade" list.
- In 2020, Comic Book Resources ranked Gwenpool 2nd in their "Marvel: 10 Joke Characters Long-Time Fans Will Always Love & Remember" list and 7th in their "10 Most Powerful Teen Heroes In Marvel Comics" list.
- In 2020, Scary Mommy included Gwenpool in their "195+ Marvel Female Characters Are Truly Heroic" list.
- In 2020, WhatCulture ranked Gwenpool 9th in their "10 Genius Comic Book Ideas That Should've Been Terrible" list.
- In 2022, Screen Rant ranked Gwenpool 1st in their "9 Strongest West Coast Avengers" list, 3rd in their "10 Iconic West Coast Avengers" list, 5th in their "10 Best Deadpool Versions" list and 8th in their "10 Asexual Icons In Comic Books" list.

== Literary reception ==
=== Volumes ===
==== Gwenpool Holiday Special – 2015 ====
According to Diamond Comic Distributors, Gwenpool Holiday Special #1 was the 16th best selling comic book in December 2015.

Jim Johnson of Comic Book Resources described Gwenpool Holiday Special #1 as a "funny and whimsical holiday one-shot," asserting, "Beyruth's art is the most traditional of this comic's artistic talent, but it readily carries the comedy of Duggan's script with seemingly little effort. Duggan's story also has a sappy but likeable sugary Christmas ending, and even serves as one of the feature's final laughs. Lastly, "Gwenpool's Holiday Adventure" by Christopher Hastings and Gurihiru is a delightfully whimsical story that defies any kind of believability, but that's just fine. Armed with all the skills a partially-viewed YouTube how-to video can supply, Gwenpool goes up against a villain who's more akin to an evil version of the genie in Disney's "Aladdin" than any kind of real threat, but—as scripted by Hastings and illustrated by Gurihiru with a touch of manga influence—the story is too much fun not to like. "Gwenpool Special" #1 isn't taken over by Gwenpool, like Kris Anka's rendering of the character on this comic's cover would indicate, but that's no issue, as the creators involved collectively make Christmastime for Marvel fans a little more enjoyable."

Jesse Schedeen of IGN gave Gwenpool Holiday Special #1 a grade of 7.5 out of 10, writing, "The Deadpoool/Hawkeye team-up from Gerry Duggan and Danilo S. Beyruth is probably the most well-rounded of the bunch. Duggan once again mines this unusual pairing to good effect and shows that there's a real, genuine bond between Deadpool, Hawkeye and "Guy Hawkeye" (as Clint is apparently now referred to in the Marvel U.). Beyruth's art captures the tone of the story well, offering a tinge of darkness but focusing mainly on expressive figure work and humor. As for the Gwenpool tale, it only suffers from the fact that it feels rather shoehorned into the rest of the book. Her own conflict has nothing to do with any thing Christmas-y, merely showcasing her skills as the most clueless yet effective assassin in the world. Her only connection to the rest of the book is that she, along with dozens of other Marvel heroes, is invited to She-Hulk's big shindig. But on its own merits this story is plenty entertaining. Guruhiru's cartoonish, manga-esque art is a perfect complement to Christopher Hastings' script. Gwenpool is arguably the least essential element of this holiday-themed anthology comic. Still, her presence is one extra dose of fun in a book that already has a lot going for it. The various stories here combine to form a charming look at how Marvel's heroes come together to celebrate the holidays."

==== The Unbelievable Gwenpool – 2016 ====
According to Diamond Comic Distributors, The Unbelievable Gwenpool #1 was the 6th best selling comic book in April 2016. The Unbelievable Gwenpool #1 was the 92nd best selling comic book in 2016.

Jim Johnson of Comic Book Resources called The Unbelievable Gwenpool #1 a "fun and decidedly comical precedent that bodes well for the series," asserting, "As this issue combines a sweet and beloved character with one of comic's deadliest and most sarcastic mercenaries, Hastings places himself on a tightrope with his story; falling off to one side means developing Gwen as a little too sugary for hardboiled Deadpool fans, and the other means making her a killer in the eyes of those who see her as an alternate version of Peter Parker's onetime girlfriend. He largely dodges that choice for now, and justifiably so, and so this high wire act is a persuasive selling point for the series' upcoming issues for now. [...] There's a kind of uncertain demeanor to "The Unbelievable Gwenpool" #1, where Hastings begins to explore his character in earnest while remaining vague about the concept's longterm workability. For now, though, the comic carries a lot of darkly humorous fun and has earned the benefit of any doubt."

Jesse Schedeen of IGN gave The Unbelievable Gwenpool #1 a grade of 8.3 out of 10, stating, "This issue encapsulates that conflict nicely. It's a fun, amusing start to Gwenpool's solo escapades, but one that doesn't shy away from the darker side of the character. It may seem like there's no more room at Marvel for goofy, lighthearted superhero fare, but The Unbelievable Gwenpool instantly finds it niche. As silly and charming as this first issue is, its real success is in contrasting Gwen's carefree spirit and devil-may-care attitude with the real, tragic consequences of her behavior. Gwen Poole isn't a role model, but she's a heck of a lot of fun to read."

George Chrysostomou of Screen Rant included The Unbelievable Gwenpool comic book series in their "Marvel Comics: The 10 Best Comic Book Runs For Young Readers" list.

==== Gwenpool Strikes Back – 2019 ====
According to Diamond Comic Distributors, Gwenpool Strikes Back #1 was the 31st best selling comic book in August 2019. Gwenpool Strikes Back #1 was the 362nd best selling comic book in 2019.

Sam Stone of Comic Book Resources called Gwenpool Strikes Back #1 the "zaniest appearance the character has had to date," writing, "Baldeón, fresh off illustrating the recent Domino miniseries, is joined by color artist Jesus Aburtov to render the colorful eye-catching return of Gwen. Gwenpool has always been a relatively bright, vibrant character -- a figure leading a bubblegum pop tour of the Marvel Universe -- and the art team more than delivers from medium-bending monologues to the reader to a back-and-forth exchange between Gwen and Spidey fresh off the heels of a gun-toting bank robbery. There is a slapstick element to the book that has always been present with the character and the art team is able to channel that signature sense of fun. True to its title, Gwenpool Strikes Back has the eponymous, irreverent Marvel character return with a vengeance and slated to cross paths with the biggest names in the Marvel Universe. Somehow even more zany than ever before, Williams makes the character her own with a rapid-fire, hyper-verbal first issue elevated by Baldeón's fan-favorite artistic flair. Wonderfully weird and a clear labor of love from the creative team, the new miniseries repositions Gwenpool as the wackiest new Marvel character in recent memory."

Megan Peters of ComicBook.com gave Gwenpool Strikes Back #1 a grade of 4 out of 5 stars, saying, "Gwenpool Strikes Back welcomes a fan-favorite heroine to a universe she was never meant to enter. The quirky character is recognizable in all her fourth-wall chaos, and Gwen has no care for social constructs. From dabbing to memes, the heroine rightly calls herself a queen of cringe culture, but it somehow works with this debut's issue as Gwen acts against a clean-cut Peter Parker. And with a new power in tow, this series promises to be one of Marvel's most outlandish on shelves these days."

== Other versions ==
=== Dark Gwenpool ===
An evil alternate future version of Gwen, called Evil Gwenpool in merchandise or Dark Gwenpool in some video games, is introduced in the story arc Beyond the Fourth Wall as the future archenemy of Miles Morales, who travels back in time to prevent Gwen from becoming her due to evil Gwen having started Civil War III, exposed Miles' secret identity to the world, and manipulated the future Goblins into killing Miles' parents, wife, and child for her. After Gwen rejects her evil self, she is apparently wiped from existence. Dark Gwenpool would return as the main antagonist of the video game Marvel Duel, and make a cameo appearance in the alternate universe of Peter Parker & Miles Morales: Spider-Men Double Trouble, attending a villain convention with Batroc the Leaper.

=== Venomverse (2017) ===
An alternate universe's version of Gwen merges with a Venom Symbiote that has unique medium awareness and knowledge of the Marvel Multiverse, but is killed and absorbed by the "Poisons" of Venomverse.

=== Deadpool Kills the Marvel Universe Again (2017) ===
An alternate version of Gwen appears in the third issue of this miniseries. Gwen is hired by Moon Knight and the Punisher to find the location of evil versions of Magneto, Red Skull, Abomination, and Doctor Doom, who are controlling Deadpool to kill that Marvel Universe's heroes. It is revealed that the series takes place in a reality similar to that of Old Man Logan, as Deadpool comes across the X-Men's Mansion after Mysterio tricks Laura Kinney / Wolverine into slaughtering the X-Men. Old Man Logan realizes that this is what is happening over the course of the issue.

== In other media ==
=== Web series ===
- As promotion for Venomverse, Gwenpool appears in "Enter Gwenpool", an episode of the tie-in web series Edge of Venomverse, depicting how the Venomverse Gwen received a symbiote.
- Gwenpool appears in Marvel TL;DR, voiced by Brenna Hines.

=== Merchandise ===
Funko Pops based on Gwenpool and the Venomized Gwen Poole have been produced since 2017, the latter reproduced in 2021 as promotion for Venom: Let There Be Carnage.

=== Video games ===
The Unbelievable Gwenpool promotional art for Marvel Future Fight.

- Gwenpool appears as a playable character in Marvel Future Fight.
- Gwenpool appears as a playable character in Marvel Strike Force.
- Gwenpool is featured in Marvel Puzzle Quest.
- Gwenpool appears as a playable character in Marvel Contest of Champions. During the game, there is also an antagonistic Gwenperion, which M.O.D.O.K. gave Hyperion's powers.
- Gwenpool appears in Lego Marvel Super Heroes 2, voiced by Becca Stewart.
- Gwenpool appears in Marvel Duel.
- Gwenpool appears in Marvel Super War, voiced by Cheryl Texiera.
- Gwenpool appears in Marvel Snap.
- Gwenpool, and a "Dark Gwenpool" skin of her, are playable in Fortnite.

=== Other ===
- The design of Gwen Stacy / Spider-Woman's bedroom in the 2023 animated feature film Spider-Man: Across the Spider-Verse was credited as taking influence from the color palette of Gurihiru's work on The Unbelievable Gwenpool: Beyond the Fourth Wall by production designer Patrick O'Keefe in January 2024.
- The Venomized Gwen Poole's access to a symbiote hive mind allowing extra-dimensional perception is adapted to Venom in the mid-credits scene of the 2021 Sony's Spider-Man Universe (SSU) film Venom: Let There Be Carnage as an ability common to all symbiotes, which Venom shows Eddie Brock before the duo are transported to the Marvel Cinematic Universe (MCU).
- In September 2021, Howard the Duck voice actor Seth Green expressed interest in Gwenpool appearing in future episodes of What If...? or a potential Howard the Duck spin-off series.
- Gwenpool co-creator Heather Antos has expressed interest in a crossover series between the character and Doctor Aphra (another Marvel character she had co-created for Marvel's Star Wars comic book series Star Wars: Darth Vader and its spin-off Star Wars: Doctor Aphra), depicting the duo as being best friends, commissioning fan art of the characters together, and of Gwen Poole herself with a Star Wars universe redesign, wielding a lightsaber.
- She appears on the bonus card from Deadpool's Magic: The Gathering Secret Lair drop, Harmless Offering, where she offers Jeff the Land Shark to the audience.

== Collected editions ==
Title	Material collected	Publication date	ISBN
English volumes
The Unbelievable Gwenpool Vol. 1: Believe It	The Unbelievable Gwenpool #0–4	November 29, 2016	978-1-30290-176-9
The Unbelievable Gwenpool Vol. 2: Head of M.O.D.O.K.	The Unbelievable Gwenpool #5–10	March 28, 2017	978-1-30290-177-6
The Unbelievable Gwenpool Vol. 3: Totally in Continuity	The Unbelievable Gwenpool #11–15, and material from Gwenpool Holiday Special: Merry Mix-Up #1	August 29, 2017	978-1-30290-547-7
The Unbelievable Gwenpool Vol. 4: Beyond the Fourth Wall	The Unbelievable Gwenpool #16–20	January 2, 2018	978-1-30290-548-4
The Unbelievable Gwenpool Vol. 5: Lost in the Plot	The Unbelievable Gwenpool #21–25	April 24, 2018	978-1-30291-040-2
West Coast Avengers: Best Coast	West Coast Avengers (vol. 3) #1–4, Young Avengers Presents #6, and The Unbelievable Gwenpool #1	February 19, 2019	978-1-30291-345-8
Gwenpool Strikes Back	Gwenpool Strikes Back #1–5	February 19, 2020	978-1-30291-923-8
Gwenpool Omnibus	The Unbelievable Gwenpool #1–25, Rocket Raccoon and Groot #8–10, Champions #5, Edge of Venomverse #2, West Coast Avengers (vol. 3) #1–10, Superior Spider-Man (vol. 2) #7-8, Gwenpool Strikes Back #1–5; and material from Howard the Duck (vol. 4) #1–3, Gwenpool Holiday Special #1, Gwenpool Holiday Special: Merry Mix-Up #1, Secret Empire: Brave New World #1, Not Brand Ecch #14	December 20, 2022	978-1-30294-820-7
Gwenpool: All-New, All-Deadly	Gwenpool (2025) #1–5	March 3, 2026	978-1-80491-348-2
Japanese volumes
Gwenpool Vol. 1: I'm Dropping In On This World! (グウェンプール：こっちの世界にオジャマしま～す, Gwenpool: Kocchi no Sekai ni Ojamashimāsu!)	The Unbelievable Gwenpool #0–4	October 27, 2017	978-4-86491-352-2
Gwenpool Vol. 2: Those Badass Guys Are Coming to Attack! (グウェンプール：イカしたやつらが攻めてきた！, Gwenpool: Ikashita Yatsura ga Semete Kita!)	The Unbelievable Gwenpool #5–10	April 27, 2018	978-4-86491-376-8
Gwenpool Vol. 3: It's Not Like I'm Scared of Deadpool or Anything! (グウェンプール：デップーなんかこわくない, Gwenpool: Deppū Nanka Kowakunai!)	The Unbelievable Gwenpool #11–15, and material from Gwenpool Holiday Special: Merry Mix-Up #1	September 27, 2018	978-4-86491-398-0
Gwenpool Vol. 4: That Time I Went and Shattered the Fourth Wall (グウェンプール：第四の壁、破っちゃいました, Gwenpool: Daiyon no Kabe, Yabucchaimashita)	The Unbelievable Gwenpool #16–20	September 27, 2018	978-4-86491-397-3
Gwenpool Vol. 5: Saying Goodbye Is Hard, But… (グウェンプール：さよならするのはつらいけど, Gwenpool: Sayonara Suru no wa Tsurai Kedo)	The Unbelievable Gwenpool #21–25	April 11, 2019	978-4-86491-415-4
Gwenpool Vol. 6: Striking Back! (グウェンプール：ストライクス・バック！, Gwenpool: Sutoraikusu Bakku!)	Gwenpool Strikes Back #1–5 (Note: In the Japanese title of the series, Gwenpool Strikes Back is collected as a sixth volume of The Unbelievable Gwenpool (titled simply as Gwenpool) instead of as a separate series.)	December 25, 2021	978-4-86491-514-4
French volumes
L'Incroyable Gwenpool Vol. 1: C'est l'histoire d'une Poole et d'un Canard (lit. It's the Story of a Poole and a Duck) (Note: In the French title of the series, "Poole" is used as a play on words for "Poule", meaning "chicken", making an alternative title of the volume "It's the Story of a Chicken and a Duck".)	The Unbelievable Gwenpool #0–3	November 18, 2016	978-2-80945-973-9
L'Incroyable Gwenpool Vol. 2: Quand on veut, on peut (lit. Where There's a Will, There's a Way	The Unbelievable Gwenpool #4–8	March 22, 2017	978-2-80946-253-1
L'Incroyable Gwenpool Vol. 3: La guilde des bras cassés (lit. The Guild of Bunglers)	The Unbelievable Gwenpool #9–14	September 20, 2017	978-2-80946-565-5
Gwenpool Omnibus : La guilde des bras cassés (lit. The Guild of Bunglers)	The Unbelievable Gwenpool #0–10 and Holiday Special: Merry Mix-Up #1	August 14, 2019	978-2-80947-916-4

The Japanese release of each volume comes with a different trade cover by Gurihiru.

== See also ==
- Cosplay
