= Christopher Hastings =

American comic writer and artist

- Born: 1983 or 1984 (age 42–43))

Christopher Hastings is an American comic writer and artist. He is known for his webcomic series The Adventures of Dr. McNinja as well as writing for The Unbelievable GwenPool for Marvel Comics and the Adventure Time comics for KaBoom! Studios.

== Biography ==
Hastings attended the School of Visual Arts in New York, graduating in 2005. He is originally from Cumberland, Maryland. He is married to Carly Monardo.

== Career ==
=== The Adventures of Dr. McNinja ===
The Adventures of Dr. McNinja is a webcomic which ran from 2004 to 2017. Hastings created Dr. McNinja while he was a student; he said that the name "Dr. McNinja" came first, and was his online handle for some time, then the comic followed. The comic updated three pages each week, with Hastings employing an inker and colorist to finish the pages. Hastings spent about 40 hours every week on the comic, spending one day per week writing the script, then four days drawing one page each day. He estimated that each page took 3–4 hours to draw. Creating Dr. McNinja was Chris' full-time job; while the comic is free online, Hastings made money by selling books and T-shirts. Books collecting the webcomic were published by TopatoCo and Dark Horse Comics.

The comic follows Dr. McNinja, a doctor who is also a ninja, dealing with problems such as giant lumberjacks, zombie ninjas, a raptor, his own family, Dracula on the moon, and ancient tennis gods. The story covered several genres, including zombies, 80s action, and science fiction. The story is set in a fictionalized version of Hasting's home town of Cumberland.

Dr. McNinja won the 2007 Web Cartoonists' Choice Award for Outstanding Superhero/Action Comic. As of 2008, the site received about 110,000 unique visitors each day.

In 2015, he began a storyline entitled "The End", the last story of the comic. Hastings said in an interview that he had decided to "pick a time to quit so that I'd know it was coming and I wouldn't burn out", so he could give a satisfying ending, though even then he said "I picked the right time, I'm definitely kind of starting to get tired of this". Hastings was already ramping up his paid work outside of Dr. McNinja in preparation for the end of the comic.

==== Crossovers and spinoffs ====
Dr. McNinja and Axe Cop had a cross-over series in 2010, co-written by Hastings.

A Kickstarter campaign was launched in 2012 for a spinoff video game to be called Dr. McNinja's Radical Adventures. The Kickstarter was successfully funded, but no game was ever produced. In 2015, the game company, Fat Cat GameWorks, made a post giving their reasons for the game's failure. According to the post, Fat Cat GameWorks randomly drew "Tiki" and "Ninja" as themes for their first ever game, and following that approached Hastings to license Dr. McNinja, to which Hastings agreed. The Kickstarter was only funded by accident, with a late bidder accidentally pledging $1500 instead of $15. Hastings received 15% of the Kickstarter funds. The company found working with an already developed IP to be too ambitious and too limiting for a new company, the funding was insufficient to make the game they had promised, and key staff had serious health issues. The post said, "We were foolish and bit off WAY more than we could chew".

=== Marvel ===
Hastings has written or co-written several works for Marvel Comics.

Title	Date(s)	Notes
Fear Itself: Deadpool	2011	A three-issue series within the Fear Itself storyline.
A+X	2012	Co-writer of one issue.
Longshot Saves The Marvel Universe	2013	A four-issue series.
Howard the Duck	2015	Co-writer of one issue.
Gwenpool Special	2015	Co-writer of this one-off issue.
Vote Loki	2016	A four-issue series.
The Unbelievable GwenPool	2016–2018	Hastings, along with the Japanese art team Gurihiru, created the character's personality and powers, based on the design created previously by Chris Bachalo; divided into the volumes Believe It, Head of M.O.D.O.K., Totally In Continuity, Beyond the Fourth Wall, and Lost in the Plot.
Edge of Venomverse	2017	Writer of one issue, in which Gwenpool gets access to the Venom symbiote.
Deadpool & the Mercs for Money	2017	Writer of two issues.
Not Brand Echh	2017	Co-wrote "issue #14" of the series; the first 13 issues were published in the 1960s
I Am Groot	2017	
Infinity Wars: Infinity Warps	2018	Co-writer on one issue.
Deadpool: Secret Agent Deadpool	2018	A six-issue series.
Gwenpool Strikes Back	2019	Co-writer on one page of one issue.

==== The Unbelievable GwenPool ====
From 2015 to 2018, after co-creating the character of Gwen Poole with Heather Antos and Jordan D. White for Howard the Duck, Hastings wrote the existentialist isekai solo series The Unbelievable GwenPool about her, across the storylines Believe It, Head of M.O.D.O.K., Totally In Continuity, Beyond the Fourth Wall, and Lost in the Plot.

=== Boom! Studios ===
Beginning on January 28, 2015, Hastings replaced Ryan North as writer for the Adventure Time comic book series at Boom! Studios. Hastings also wrote the Wet Hot American Summer graphic novel, a prequel of the movie of the same name, and the comic series Regular Show: 25 Years Later.

=== Dynamite Entertainment ===
Hastings has served as writer for several comic book miniseries for Dynamite: "The Six Million Dollar Man" based on the TV series and "Sonjaversal" which was expanded from its originally planned five issues with a sequel, "Hell Sonja".

=== Other work ===
Hastings co-created webcomics for the company ShiftyLook, adapting the video games Galaga and Dig Dug into comics.

In 2018, Hastings launched a Kickstarter for a graphic novel called Draculagate to be co-created by Hastings and Branson Reese. The project successfully received funding of $44,772 on November 4 2018. The last update was posted on June 13 2022.

In 2019, Hastings began writing the webcomic Never Enough: The Wario Diaries.

Since 2021, Hastings collaborated with Scott Cawthon on making graphic novel adaptations based on Five Nights at Freddy's books.
