= Irene Strychalski =

American comic book artist

- Born: Irene Strychalski; October 16, 1989 (age 37) Hsinchu, Taiwan
- Areas: Cartoonist, Writer, Penciller, Artist, Inker, Letterer, Colourist
- Notable works: Unbelievable Gwenpool; Silk (2016) vol.14-17 Deadpool Corps Shlock Therapy; Marvel Rising: Squirrel Girl/ Ms. Marvel vol. 1 Fiendish

Irene Strychalski is an American comic book artist best known for her work on Unbelievable Gwenpool and Silk for Marvel Comics.

== Career ==
Irene Strychalski attended Savannah College of Art and Design in Atlanta, Georgia where she graduated with a Bachelor of Fine Arts in sequential arts. She entered the comics industry in 2011 at Marvel Comics where she illustrated Deadpool Family #1. Over the following years, she illustrated other Marvel titles including Silk (2016) issues #14 through #17 and Unbelievable Gwenpool #5, #6, #22, and #23 as well as Edge of the Venomverse #3 where she created the design for Venpool. She illustrated Marvel Rising: Squirrel Girl / Ms. Marvel, and Marvel Rising: Ms. Marvel / Squirrel Girl in 2018. She illustrated Marvel Super Hero Adventures: Spider-man's Spider-Sense of Adventure the following year in 2019. In 2020 Irene illustrated a short story in Deadpool (2020 series) #4 and this would be the most recent work she has done for Marvel. After 2020 Irene would move on from working for Marvel to focus on creating her independent comic book series. In 2025 she released her third issue of her graphic novel series Fiendish. She also worked on a cover for Yaira #3 for Rippaverse Comics.

== Bibliography ==
=== Hellion Comics ===
- Fiendish (comic) #1 (2022)
- Fiendish (comic) #2 (2023)
- Fiendish (comic) #2.5 (2024)
- Fiendish (comic) #3 (2025)

=== Marvel Comics ===
- Deadpool (2020 series) #4 (2020)
- Deadpool Family #1 (2011)
- Marvel Rising: Ms. Marvel / Squirrel Girl #1 (2018)
- Marvel Rising: Squirrel Girl / Ms. Marvel #1 (2018)
- Marvel Super Hero Adventures: Spider-man's Spider-Sense of Adventure #1 (2019)
- Silk (2016) #14 - #17 (2016)
- Unbelievable Gwenpool #5, #6, #22, and #23 (2016)
- Edge of the Venomverse #2 (2017)

=== Image Comics ===
- Chew: Warrior Chicken Poyo (one-shot) (2014)
- Winnebago Graveyard #3 (one page guest art) (2017)

== See also ==
- List of American comics creators
- List of Marvel Comics people
