= The Undead Iron Fist =

Comic book series by Marvel Comics

- The cover to The Undead Iron Fist #1 (2025), art by Whilce Portacio and Alex Sinclair.

Publication information
- Publisher: Marvel Comics
- Schedule: Monthly
- Format: Limited series
- Genre: Superhero
- Publication date: September 2025 – December 2025
- No. of issues: 4
- Main character(s): Ghost Fist; Quan Yaozu; Osiris; Orson Randall; Luke Cage

Creative team
- Written by: Jason Loo
- Artist: Fran Galán
- Letterer: Travis Lanham
- Colorist: Jim Campbell
- Editor: Danny Khazem

The Undead Iron Fist is an American comic book published by Marvel Comics. The four-issue limited series, written by Jason Loo and illustrated by Fran Galán, began publication on September 10, 2025 and ended on December 31 of the same year. Following his death in the one-shot comic Iron Fist 50th Anniversary Special (2024), the former Iron Fist Danny Rand resurfaces as an undead being called the Ghost Fist and embarks on a journey to uncover the secrets of the legacy of the Iron Fist mantle and stop those who threaten to destroy that legacy. The series received positive reviews from critics.

== Plot ==
After his death at the hands of the Ch'i-Lin, (Note: As depicted in the one-shot comic Iron Fist 50th Anniversary Special (2024)) the former Iron Fist Danny Rand finds himself in the Duat, where he encounters and loses a challenge to a dragon. Danny is then greeted by his deceased predecessor Orson Randall, who reveals that everything the Book of the Iron Fist taught them was a lie. Orson informs Danny of the corruption behind the Iron Fist order and that he has a chance to come back to the mortal world if he can take down the Book's author, his former ally Quan Yaozu, who had orchestrated the deaths of the previous Iron Fists to siphon their chi for himself. Orson takes Danny to Osiris, who agrees to make Danny his avatar after judging his soul but he must undergo a trial to destroy Quan; creating a tapestry representing Danny's soul, Osiris explains that it will burn once he returns to the living for his trial but if it burns completely before finishing it, Danny will be forever bound to the underworld. Osiris trains Danny for several months and implants his symbol on Danny's chest, replacing his old Heart of the Dragon mark. Danny is then resurrected as an undead and bestowed with a new costume and powers as the Ghost Fist by Osiris.

Mayor Luke Cage visits Danny's grave in Cavalry Cemetery, only to find the plot empty. As the risen Ghost Fist makes his way to Quan at the Rand Building in Harlem, Quan sends his minions, the Wraithlins, to stall Ghost Fist. With his new powers and Osiris mentally guiding him, Ghost Fist is able to sense and purge the Wraithlins from their human hosts. Unfortunately, due to being unrecognizable in his new costume and unable to see the Wraithlins, passerby mistake Ghost Fist for a costumed criminal attacking civilians, leading to a brief confrontation with Spider-Man. The fight leads to the sewers but when Spider-Man is able to see the Wraithlins, they turn their attention to him. Ghost Fist is forced to use an attack called the "Rays of Ra" to destroy the Wraithlins and save Spider-Man but causes his more of his tapestry within the Duat to burn away. Urged by Osiris to not reveal his identity and to continue his mission, Ghost Fist warns Spider-Man to stay out of his way.

Ghost Fist continues on to the Rand Building while fighting off Wraithlins, eventually encountering Daredevil, who deduces Ghost Fist's identity. The two are nearly overwhelmed by an army of Wraithlins in Times Square and Ghost Fist reluctantly abandons Daredevil to continue his mission alone. When Danny arrives in Central Park, Quan dispatches the Wraithlin-possessed Immortal Weapons, but Danny is able to defeat and free them. Danny makes it to the Rand Building but is confronted by Luke, who is also possessed by a Wraithlin.

Ghost Fist hesitates to fight his best friend, allowing the possessed Luke to knock him out and take him to Quan, who has opened up a portal to the Eighth City within the Rand Building's penthouse to augment his chi. Quan confesses his role in the deaths of the previous Iron Fists by using the Book of the Iron Fist to acquire their knowledge and weaknesses and having the Ch'i-Lin take their chi to increase his power and prolong his life. Although acknowledging Danny's previous attempt to redeem him, (Note: As depicted in the comic book series The Immortal Iron Fist (2006–2009)) Quan states that his grudge against K'un-Lun ran too deep and gloats about taking away his family's empire after killing him again. Ghost Fist breaks free and summons the spirit of T'an-Long, the dragon he encountered in the underworld. Ghost Fist reveals that T'an-Long was once a heavenly dragon who guarded the Capital Cities of Heaven until she was killed by Quan and his minions and that he brought her with him for both of them to get their revenge on Quan together. Ghost Fist and T'an-Long free Luke from his possession and knock Quan out of the penthouse. Quan falls to his death and has his soul dragged to the underworld by T'an-Long; with this completed, Danny's tapestry stops burning just before it is completely disintegrated.

As Luke comes to, he finds Danny has disappeared. Days later, Luke has Danny's grave taken down. It is revealed that Danny has returned to the underworld, where Osiris considers his bargain fulfilled but has him remain in the underworld until he is needed in the realm of the living again.

== Publication history ==
In June 2025, Marvel Comics announced a four-issue comic book limited series titled The Undead Iron Fist, with Jason Loo as writer and Fran Galán as artist. It focuses on the former Iron Fist Danny Rand, who is resurrected as an undead being called the Ghost Fist after his death in the one-shot comic Iron Fist 50th Anniversary Special (2024). Artist Von Randal designed Ghost Fist's costume for the series; it includes arnis sticks, armor encasing his right arm–which had been severed in Iron Fist 50th Anniversary Special–and a full cowl mask inspired by the Wildstorm and DC Comics character Grifter. Initially, Randal incorporated a dragon motif on the armor's spaulder, but editor Danny Khazem requested it be replaced. Randal ultimately settled on an eagle, which he felt better aligned with the themes of The Undead Iron Fist. The Undead Iron Fist began publication on September 10, 2025, and ended on December 31 of the same year.

=== Issues ===
Issue	Title	Publication date	Ref.
#1	"Chapter One: Stranger in the Lower East End"	September 10, 2025	
#2	"Chapter Two: Midtown Mayhem"	October 22, 2025	
#3	"Chapter Three: Brawl in Central Park"	November 26, 2025	
#4	"Chapter Four: Hell in Harlem"	December 31, 2025	

== Reception ==
According to ComicbookRoundup, the series received an average rating of 8.6 out of 10 based on 15 reviews.

== Future ==
In November 2025, Marvel Comics announced that The Undead Iron Fist would be followed by Deadly Hands of K'un-Lun, a five-issue limited series written by Yifan Jiang and illustrated by Paco Medina, published between February and June 2026.
