= Marvel Duel =

- Developer: NetEase
- Publisher: NetEase
- Platforms: iOS, Android
- Release: SEA: July 31, 2020
- Genre: Collectible card game
- Mode: Multiplayer

Marvel Duel is a mobile multiplayer collectible card game developed and published by NetEase in collaboration with Marvel Entertainment for Android and iOS. In this game, the players (led by Gwen Poole) battle each other using cards representing characters from the Marvel Universe. Like NetEase's other Marvel title Marvel Super War, this game is not a global release and is only available in select countries, launching in Thailand, Indonesia, Philippines, and Malaysia in July 2020 and later expanding to Singapore, Taiwan, Hong Kong and Macau. The game is free-to-play with a game shop that sells packs and cards in addition to various cosmetic items.

== Plot ==
The story follows the invasion of the villainous metafictional Dark Gwenpool into the past as she steals the superpowers of the heroes of the Marvel Universe, as her heroic present-day counterpart, the game's protagonist Gwen Poole, a girl from the real world, must help the heroes, including Spider-Man, Iron Man, Thor Odinson, and Star-Lord, track her future self down before she brings all of creation to an end.

== Gameplay ==
=== Collection ===
The majority of the game's cards represent heroes and villains from the Marvel Comics, with the rest split between the "item", "tactic" and "event" card types. Cards are divided by rarity into Common, Rare, Epic and Incomparable, with each booster pack containing at least one card of Rare of higher quality. Players get a small amount of cards and booster packs from the daily challenges, with the option to purchase more with two in-game currencies: one awarded by playing games and another available through real money purchase. Players are unable to trade cards between each other; instead after obtaining four copies of a card, any subsequent copies will be converted to a type of crystals, which in large quantities allow the players to create the desired cards directly.

=== Deck building ===
While constructing their deck, players have several restrictions. Each deck must contain three different superhero archetypes in addition to the fourth "Neutral" archetype. For each archetype, only two cards of cost between 2 and 6 each can be added, for a total of 40 unique cards. Players may choose to add up to three additional copies of each card, although this may not always be beneficial. Furthermore, the player's deck is then combined with a "fixed" deck of 18 to 21 cards (with 4 copies of each) that are the same for each player and cannot be purchased. During the game players also get the opportunity to use cards that are not present in their deck or even in their Collection at all, as various skills and effects bring random cards into their hand or onto the Battlefield directly.

=== Multiplayer ===
For each game, the player selects one of the super heroes to use as their avatar, which are separate from their cards and can bring additional skill actions into play. Although heroes are archetype restricted (for example, Iron Man belongs to Stark Industries archetype), the skills available during the game are determined by their overall level and not by the superhero currently selected. For example, while using a deck consisting of Elektra, Doctor Strange and Spider-Man archetypes, the player using Star-Lord as their avatar will still be able to choose between Elektra, Doctor Strange and Spider-Man skills to use, while the benefit of using Star-Lord is to increase his level and eventually unlock additional skills.

A mid-game battlefield. Character avatars and their health are located in the opposing corners. Cards display their current power/health and equipment. When defeating an opponent, each character performs a unique animation.

Each game is played between six players (in training matches the player faces five different AI opponents), who take turns facing each other one-on-one. Each turn consists of two phases: "Preparation" phase in which the players play and rearrange their cards and a subsequent "Battle" phase. During the Preparation phase, each player gets an even amount of "battle gems" which can be spent on cards from the Shop (not to be confused with the Card Store, the Shop contains cards from the player's current deck). As each card has a cost between 2 and 6, so does the Shop level determine how many cards will be available at once and what will their highest cost be: players start with Shop level 2 and can spend their gems on upgrading it at different turns in the game. If all current cards in the Shop have been purchased or are undesirable, players can also spend their gems to refresh the current selection completely. Once purchased, cards can be played on the Battlefield, which at its maximum can contain six characters equipped with one item each and five tactics; cards be destroyed for one gem each to make room for the better cards. The shop will never contain more than one copy of any card at a time, so players must buy at least one in order to get additional copies to appear. This is especially valuable with the characters, as two identical character cards will combine into a single card with double values of all stats and skill effects. This can be repeated again to make the characters four or even eight times more powerful than their initial state; this is one of the main ways to increase one's overall power while still being restricted to only six character cards.

During the Battle phase, the players have no direct control over their characters, who starting from the left take their actions in turn and select opposing characters to attack at random. Certain restriction still apply and the players can tweak the order of their cards during the Preparation phase in hopes of a more desirable outcome. During the Battle phase, card effects may increase or decrease stats of other cards on the Battlefield and even bring in new cards into play, but none of these effects are permanent, as after the Battle phase ends each player's cards revert to their state at end of the last Preparation phase (while any buffs and other effects made during the Preparation phase remain for the duration of the game). Attacking one another, characters will deal damage until their power (which also doubles as their health) reaches zero, at which point they are eliminated. After all characters on one side are defeated, the winning side deals damage to the losing avatar equal to their shop level plus the total star level of their surviving characters; if the player's avatar's health reaches zero, they are likewise eliminated from the table. In a typical game, it takes between 8 and 11 rounds for all but one player to be eliminated, making the total game last around 20–25 minutes. The top 3 players out of 6 are all considered "victorious", although the second place gets only half the rating of the first place, the fifth place only loses half of what the sixth place lost and so on.

== Game modes ==
The main game mode is a typical match between six players randomly paired based on their rating, available in both casual and competitive formats, the latter affecting players' ranking within the current season. Other multiplayer modes available only during certain hours of the day are "Team-Up" in which two players combine their decks and the six-player game is played between 3 pairs of 2 opponents and "Arena", which requires entry tickets and challengers the players with creating decks from randomly suggested cards. In the Solo mode, training matches against AI opponents and short story-based missions which award cards and booster packs are also available. Other special modes have been made available for a limited time as part of exclusive events.

== UX design and user research ==
From the first prototype of Marvel Duel, Netease Thunderfire UX team has been engaging in the development process in terms of both UX design (such as the 3D jumping out of cards effect of heroes when fighting) and user research projects.

== Reception ==
BlueStacks game guide praised the game's quality and mechanics, despite noting the inability to target specific opposing character to be "egregious". The author of the TCG-dedicated blog Duel Links Forum gave the game a positive review, noting the quality of character models and animations, the game's overall stability and lack of major bugs and the good balance, as neither superhero felt superior to all others, nor did the cash shop guarantee a pay-to-win scenario.
