= The Unbelievable Gwenpool =

Ongoing series published by Marvel Comics, 2016-2018

- Cover of The Unbelievable Gwenpool #1 (June 2016). Art by Gurihiru Studios.

Publication information
- Publisher: Marvel Comics
- Schedule: Monthly
- Format: Ongoing series
- Genre: Superhero
- Publication date: June 2016 – April 2018
- No. of issues: 26
- Main character: Gwen Poole

Creative team
- Written by: Christopher Hastings
- Artists: Gurihiru; Danilo Beyruth; Irene Strychalski; Myisha Haynes; Alti Firmansyah

Collected editions
- Believe It: ISBN 1-302-90176-1
- Head of M.O.D.O.K.: ISBN 1-302-90177-X
- Totally In Continuity: ISBN 1-302-90547-3
- Beyond the Fourth Wall: ISBN 1-302-90548-1
- Lost in the Plot: ISBN 1-302-91040-X

The Unbelievable Gwenpool is an American comic book series published by Marvel Comics, featuring Gwen Poole as its main protagonist. Written by Christopher Hastings and primarily illustrated by Gurihiru, the series was a spin-off from the character's feature in a Howard the Duck comic, and was Gwenpool's first solo series. The series lasted 27 issues, #1–25, two holidays specials, and a special #0 that collected her intro material (including the first holiday special). The series ran from June 2016 to April 2018, and was followed by the spin-off webtoon series It's Jeff!, published since 2021, with Gurihiru returning as the primary artists.

== Publication history ==
Gwenpool's first appearance was on a variant cover for Deadpool's Secret Secret Wars, and the character became a surprising hit among fans despite not appearing in an actual comic. After receiving a holiday special one-shot and appearing as a secondary character in a Howard the Duck story, entitled "Ms. Poole if You're Nasty", Marvel announced the release of The Unbelievable Gwenpool in December 2015, retaining the core creative team of Christopher Hastings and Gurihiru who had developed the Gwenpool holiday one-shot. The series debuted in June 2016, and released a special #0 issue along with The Unbelievable Gwenpool #2 that collected the character's Christmas and Howard the Duck adventures.

== Reception ==
According to comic book review aggregator Comic Book Roundup, The Unbelievable Gwenpool has an average review score of 8 out of 10, indicating generally favorable reviews. Critics generally praised Hastings' writing (noting that he did not bog down the character in origin stories), and especially the art from Gurihiru.

Kinja's Observation Deck wrote favorably of the last issue, where Gwen Poole converses with other characters outside the fabric of reality in an effort to understand her actions, saying that the series finale demonstrated the "incredible power of comic books."

According to trade publication ICv2, the first issue of The Unbelievable Gwenpool was the 6th best-selling comic for April 2016, selling 100,852 units.

== Accolades ==
The Unbelievable Gwenpool won second place in the 2018 Gaiman Awards for the first two volumes of The Unbelievable Gwenpool.

== Collected editions ==
- The Unbelievable Gwenpool Vol. 1: Believe It [#0–4] (ISBN 1302901761)
- The Unbelievable Gwenpool Vol. 2: Head of M.O.D.O.K. [#5–10] (ISBN 130290177X)
- The Unbelievable Gwenpool Vol. 3: Totally In Continuity [#11–15 and Gwenpool Holiday Special: Merry Mix-Up #1] ISBN 1302905473)
- The Unbelievable Gwenpool Vol. 4: Beyond the Fourth Wall [#16–20] (ISBN 1302905481)
- The Unbelievable Gwenpool Vol. 5: Lost in the Plot [#21–25] (ISBN 130291040X)

== In other media ==
Hulu aired a M.O.D.O.K. animated series, featuring the Mercenary Organization Dedicated Only to Killing introduced in The Unbelievable Gwenpool, with MODOK voiced by Patton Oswalt, who also co-wrote and executive produced the series with Jordan Blum.

In 2021 Marvel Cinematic Universe (MCU) film Spider-Man: No Way Home, the initial spell Peter Parker attempts to have Doctor Strange cast to make the world forget he is Spider-Man, and the spell he ultimately later has Strange cast alongside the barriers of the multiverse to make his existence completely forgotten to the entire world, are respectively adapted from The Amazing Spider-Man storyline "One Moment in Time" and the The Unbelievable Gwenpool storyline "Believe It", introduced as a spell Gwen has Strange cast to make her original world forget her existence; Strange additionally compliments Benedict Cumberbatch's portrayal of him in the original storyline.

In January 2024, Spider-Man: Across the Spider-Verse production designer Patrick O'Keefe confirmed the film's pink hair-highlighted Gwen Stacy / Spider-Woman to have been visually inspired by Gwen Poole (as illustrated by Gurihiru for Beyond the Fourth Wall), with artist Peter Chan also basing the color palette of Gwen Stacy's bedroom off of Gwen Poole's hospital gown in the storyline.
