= Jason Loo =

Canadian comic book artist and writer

- Born: Jason Loo Brampton, Ontario, Canada
- Areas: Writer, Artist
- Notable works: The Pitiful Human-Lizard, Afterlift, The All-Nighter, Dazzler

Jason Loo is a Canadian cartoonist and comics writer who has written and drawn for Marvel Comics and independent comics. He won the Eisner Award for Best Digital Comic in 2020 alongside Chip Zdarsky for his work on Afterlift and has been nominated for a Harvey Award, a Joe Shuster Award, and a Doug Wright Award.

== Career ==
In 2014, Loo wrote, drew, and crowdfunded his own book, The Pitiful Human-Lizard, about a Toronto-based superhero who struggles with his life and work as an office clerk. It was later published through Chapterhouse Comics and went on for 17 issues before ending in 2019. The comic was lauded and called "quintessentially, unapologetically Canadian."

In 2019, Loo and Chip Zdarsky teamed up to create Afterlift for ComiXology Originals, about a rideshare into Hell. Loo and Zdarsky previously knew each other when Loo was a college intern at Zdarsky's studio, the Royal Academy of Illustration and Design.

In 2021, a fan comic that Loo had done in 2017 starring Multiple Man caught the eye of Marvel editor Tom Brevoort and Loo was hired to do a backup comic about the Multiple Man in X-Corp #3. That same year, Loo and Zdarsky teamed up to do another ComiXology Original called The All-Nighter about a vampire who decides to become a superhero.

In 2023, it was announced that he would be writing a new four-issue Sentry mini-series about the various characters who inherit the Sentry's powers after his death. The next year, he was announced as the writer for the one-shot Blood Hunt: Werewolf by Night and subsequent Werewolf by Night series, which would be a part of Marvel's more R-rated "Red Band" comics. It was also announced that Loo would write a four-issue Dazzler book for the X-Men: From the Ashes relaunch.

In August 2024, Loo contributed to the Iron Fist 50th Anniversary Special, which featured several short stories commemorating the 50th anniversary of the titular character; Loo's story, which was the final entry, concluded with Danny Rand being killed off. In June 2025, it was announced that Loo would be writing the four issue limited series The Undead Iron Fist, which will feature the resurrection of Rand.

== Personal life ==
Loo lives and works in Toronto. He was born in Brampton, Ontario, grew up in Mississauga, and went to Sheridan College.

== Bibliography ==
=== Marvel Comics ===
- Cosmo the Spacedog Infinity Comic #1-6 (2023) (writing)
- Crypt of Shadows vol. 5 #1, short story "Monster Games" (2024) (writing)
- Daredevil vol. 7 #11, short story "Painful Lesson" (2023) (writing)
- Fantastic Four vol. 6 #35, short story "Some Family Time" (2021) (writing/art)
- Extreme Venomverse #5, short story "Spider's Eclipse" (2023) (writing)
- Howard the Duck vol. 7 #1, "Waugh If... Howard the Duck Became an X-Men?" (2023) (writing)
- Infinity Paws Infinity Comic #1-10 (2024) (writing)
- Iron Fist:
  - Iron Fist 50th Anniversary Special #1, short story "Happy Birthday, Danny" (2024) (writing)
  - The Undead Iron Fist #1-4 (2025) (writing)
- Iron Man Annual vol. 4 #1 (2023) (writing)
- Lucky the Pizza Dog Infinity Comic #1 (2021) (writing/art)
- Marvel Meow and Pizza Dog Infinity Comic #1-4 (2023) (writing/art)
- Marvel's Voices Infinity Comic #82-83 (2023) (writing)
- Marvel's Voices: Spider-Verse #1, short story "Workin' It Out" (2023) (writing/art)
- Mighty Marvel Holiday Special: Ghost Rider Infinity Comic #1 (2022) (writing)
- Sentry vol. 4 #1-4 (2023–2024) (writing)
- Spider-Boy vol. 2 #8 (2024) (art)
- What Is... A Flerken Infinity Comic #1 (2023) (writing/art)
- Werewolf by Night:
  - Werewolf by Night: Blood Hunt #1 (2024) (writing)
  - Werewolf by Night #1-10 (2024–2025) (writing)
- X-Men:
  - X-Corp #3, short story "Multiple Sabotage" (2021) (writing/art)
  - X-Men Unlimited Infinity Comic #21, 27–28, 34, 41, 56–58, 92-95 (2022–2023) (writing/art)
  - New Mutants vol. 4 #30, short story "Karma" (2022) (art)
  - Dazzler vol. 3 #1-4 (2024) (writing)

=== Other Comics ===
==== Chapterhouse Comics ====
- The Pitiful Human-Lizard #1-17 (2014–2019) (writing/art)
- Chapterhouse Summer Special 2016 (2016) (writing/art)

==== ComiXology Originals ====
- Afterlift #1-5 (2019), later reprinted by Dark Horse (art)
- The All-Nighter #1-10 (2021–2024), later reprinted by Dark Horse (art)

==== IDW ====
- Star Wars Adventures Annual 2021, short story "The Coin" (2021) (art)
- Star Wars High Republic Adventures Annual 2021, short story "No Stone Unturned" (2021) (art)

==== Image Comics ====
- Stillwater: The Escape #1 (2022) (writing/art)

==== Other Comics ====
- Awol'd (2008) (self published) (writing/art)
- Razorblades #2 (2020) (Tiny Onion) (art)
