= Marvel Meow =

2021 comic

- Cover art of 2021 manga

Publication information
- Publisher: Marvel Comics
- Schedule: Monthly
- Format: Ongoing
- Publication date: October 12, 2021 (manga); March 4, 2022−present (series)
- No. of issues: 42
- Main character: Chewie

Creative team
- Written by: Nao Fuji
- Artist: Nao Fuji

Marvel Meow is the title of various Marvel Comics publications written and illustrated by Nao Fuji. Originating from a series of her variant covers of other Marvel titles released in 2019, Fuji released a stand-alone Marvel Meow manga in 2021. An ongoing comic series under the same name was then released in 2022 on Marvel Unlimited, a web service used by the publisher to distribute its comics. It received a print released in 2024.

== Background ==
In February 2019, as part of the promotional rollout for the Captain Marvel film, Marvel Comics announced a series of "Marvel Meow" variant covers for issues of six comic titles releasing that March. Designed by Japanese artist Nao Fuji, the variant covers paid homage to Captain Marvel's pet alien cat Chewie. The six March 2019 issues that received variants were Daredevil #3, Friendly Neighborhood Spider-Man #4, Guardians of the Galaxy #3, Meet the Skrulls #2, Thor #11, and Wolverine: Infinity Watch #2. In March, Marvel announced that a Marvel Meow comic would be included inside Black Cat #1, which released in June 2019.

== Publication history ==
Marvel announced a collaboration with manga publisher Viz in April 2021 to release three manga outside of Japan. Marvel Meow, illustrated by Fuji was one of these three. At the time, it was already available in Japan, but it was set to release elsewhere in the fall. The manga centered around Chewie involved in the day-to-day of other Marvel characters such as Spider-Man, Deadpool, and Thanos. It was released outside of Japan on October 12.

A Marvel Meow series was then released under Marvel Unlimited's Infinity Comics line on March 4, 2022. In October 2023, a print release for the Infinity Comic series was announced along with a new story and three new covers. Released on January 3, 2024, the 58-page print collection featured variant covers by Doaly and Chrissie Zullo. In addition to Chewie, the series also features Black Cat's and the Winter Soldier's cats, Luho and Alpine, respectively. Issues of Marvel Meow were included in the It's Jeff and Other Marvel Tails #1 collection, released on September 3, 2025.

In March 2023, a limited series titled Marvel Meow and Pizza Dog was released on Marvel Unlimited. It was written and illustrated by Jason Loo.

On November 4, 2026, Marvel Meow / Strange Scales #1 was released, featuring Doctor Strange's pet snake.

== Literary reception ==
Media writers positively reviewed the 2021 manga for its peaceful and humorous tone in featuring Marvel characters in "softer, more playful" situations. Reviewers also complimented Fuji's visual style, calling it "cute" and "polished". On the six-to-nine panel composition featured in most of the manga's comic strips, Eric Alex Cline of AIPT Comics wrote that "Fuji utilizes this format well with consistent, steady pacing that keeps most of the events clear and easy to follow", but criticized when the format was deviated from. Briana Lawrence of The Mary Sue, meanwhile was mildly critical of the lack of a narrative, writing that "once you get through all the visual gags there's not much else left".
