= Venomverse =

Comic book story arc

- Cover to Venomverse #1. Art by Nick Brashaw.

Publication information
- Publisher: Marvel Comics
- Format: Limited series
- Genre: Superhero
- Publication date: 2017
- No. of issues: 5
- Main characters: Venom; Eddie Brock; Venom-Army; Poisons

Creative team
- Written by: Cullen Bunn
- Penciller: Iban Coello
- Editor: Devin Lewis

Venomverse (also written as VenomVerse) is a 2017 comic book limited series starring Eddie Brock and Venom. It was written by Cullen Bunn and drawn by Iban Coello, accompanied by the companion series Edge of Venomverse serving as a lead-in to the 2018 crossover event "Venomized" (2018), which in-turn were followed by the sequel limited series Extreme Venomverse and Death of the Venomverse (both 2023), Venomverse Reborn (2024), and Spider-Verse vs. Venomverse (2025). The series takes a similar premise as the 2014 event Spider-Verse, in different iterations of Venom from across the multiverse being drawn together just as versions of Spider-Man were.

== Publication history ==
Marvel started a new Venom comic in 2016, where the main character was Lee Price, a new host of the symbiote, but Eddie Brock, the original Venom, returned in Venom #6 at fan request. This return was soon followed by the Edge of Venomverse miniseries, starring Venom and alternate versions of other Marvel characters. The actual Venomverse arc was released after the conclusion of the Edge of... miniseries, written by Cullen Bunn and drawn by Iban Coello, who had already worked together in Deadpool & the Mercs for Money. Editor Devin Lewis described it as "the biggest Venom story of all time", and it intended to make Venom an important character in the Marvel universe. Bunn pointed that most of the other main characters were selected because they would seem unexpected hosts of the symbiote. Lewis mentioned Deadpool in particular, and said that "Deadpool is one of our main venomized protagonists. He's got so much heart and he's also a source of unpredictability, insanity, and goofiness". Bunn preferred instead his version of Rocket Raccoon.

The series also introduced a new alien race, the Poisons, based on character designs by Ed McGuinness. Venomverse: War Stories was released alongside the main event, and served as a second anthology series based on the characters. It included a story about Punisher, written and drawn by Declan Shalvey. The Poisons were introduced to the Marvel Universe in the "Poison X" arc, a crossover between the Venom and X-Men Blue comics, which set up Venomized, the sequel to Venomverse, by the same authors.

== Plot ==
After a battle with the Jack O'Lantern, Venom suddenly disappears and appears in an alternate dimension (along with Mania), summoned by Doctor Strange. He was recruited for an ongoing war between the Venoms and the Poisons. The Venoms are many alternate versions of known characters from Marvel Comics, all of them bonded with a Symbiote. This includes an alternate Spider-Man and the Mary Jane Watson from the Amazing Spider-Man: Renew Your Vows comic, but also characters usually unrelated to the Spider-Man mythos, such as Strange, Captain America, Rocket Raccoon, Ghost Rider and X-23. The Poisons are creatures that feed on heroes bonded with symbiotes, which permanently turns both the host and the symbiote into one of them. They are led by a poisoned Doctor Doom.

Strange realizes that bringing Venoms to continue the war only gives more prey to the Poisons, so he returns everyone to their native reality before dying. However, the war made the Poisons aware of the multiverse, and they decide to explore alternate dimensions on their own. The final scene reveals that Doom actually worked for Thanos, who is also poisoned.

== Sequels ==
=== Spider-Verse vs. Venomverse (2025) ===
Spider-Verse vs. Venomverse is a 2025 comic book limited series published by Marvel Comics featuring multiple alternative versions of Spider-Man and Venom that had appeared in various media, and their supporting casts, also serving as a continuation of Venomverse, Venomized, and Extreme Venomverse. The series is much shorter than the original one lasting 5 issues and having no tie-ins, written by Mat Groom and Kyle Higgins.

== In other media ==
Different incarnations of Poisons appear as playable characters in the mobile game Spider-Man Unlimited.

In the mid-credits scene of the Sony's Spider-Man Universe (SSU) film Venom: Let There Be Carnage (2021), Venom reveals to their host Eddie Brock that they have "hive knowledge across universes", a concept originating from Venomized Gwen Poole from the Venomverse sub-series Edge of Venomverse and described by her symbiote as being unique to her, before the duo suddenly find themselves transported to the Marvel Cinematic Universe (MCU).

== Collected editions ==
Title	Material collected	Published date	ISBN
Venomverse	Venomverse #1–5	December 2017	978-1302909345
Edge of Venomverse	Edge of Venomverse #1–5 and Venomverse: War Stories #1	November 2017	978-1302908560
Venomized	Venomized #1–5	July 2018	978-1302911690
Extreme Venomverse	Extreme Venomverse #1–5	October 2023	978-1302952181
Death of the Venomverse	Death of the Venomverse #1–5	December 2023	978-1302951993
Venomverse Reborn	Venomverse Reborn #1–4	October 2024	978-1302960414
Spider-Verse vs. Venomverse	Spider-Verse vs. Venomverse #1–5	January 2026	978-1302961558

== See also ==
- List of Venom titles
- Spider-Verse
- Sony's Spider-Man Universe
